= Hai Jawani Toh Ishq Hona Hai =

2026 Indian film by David Dhawan

- Theatrical release poster
- Directed by: David Dhawan
- Written by: Yunus Sajawal
- Dialogues by: Farhad Samji
- Produced by: Ramesh Taurani; Gaurav Bose
- Starring: Varun Dhawan; Mrunal Thakur; Pooja Hegde
- Cinematography: Ayananka Bose
- Edited by: Ritesh Soni
- Music by: Songs: White Noise Collectives; Tanishk Bagchi; Javed–Mohsin; Rony Ajnali; Gill Machhrai; Akshay–IP; Score: Raju Singh
- Production companies: Tips Films; Maximilian Films (UK)
- Distributed by: Tips Films
- Release date: 5 June 2026
- Running time: 136 minutes
- Country: India
- Language: Hindi
- Budget: ₹55 crore
- Box office: ₹73.81 crore

Hai Jawani Toh Ishq Hona Hai (transl. When there is youth, there will be love; also known by the acronym HJTIHH) is a 2026 Indian Hindi-language romantic comedy film directed by David Dhawan. The film is produced by Ramesh Taurani under the banner Tips Films and co-produced by Gaurav Bose of Maximilian Films. It stars Varun Dhawan, Mrunal Thakur and Pooja Hegde in the lead roles, alongside Maniesh Paul, Chunky Panday, Jimmy Sheirgill and Mouni Roy in the supporting roles. The film is marked to be David Dhawan's final directorial film.

Development began in December 2023, with David Dhawan reuniting with his son Varun for their fourth collaboration. The project was officially announced in July 2024, with principal photography commencing shortly after, taking place across Mumbai, Goa, Rishikesh and Edinburgh. The music was composed by White Noise Collectives, Tanishk Bagchi, Javed–Mohsin, Rony Ajnali, Gill Machhrai and Akshay–IP, while Raju Singh composed the film score. The cinematography was handled by Ayananka Bose and editing by Ritesh Soni.

Hai Jawani Toh Ishq Hona Hai was released in theatres worldwide on 5 June 2026 to mixed-to-negative reviews from critics.

== Cast ==
- Varun Dhawan as Jass Ahuja
- Mrunal Thakur as Baani
- Pooja Hegde as Preet
- Maniesh Paul as Kunnu
- Chunky Panday as Dr. Gulati
- Jimmy Sheirgill as Jogi Randhawa
- Mouni Roy as Rasmalai
- Ali Asgar as Judge
- Rajesh Kumar as Ghuggi
- Rakesh Bedi as Selfie Kumar
- Kubbra Sait as Dr. Smita
- Rajpal Yadav as PT Master Mishra
- Johny Lever as Godbole
- Manoj Pahwa as Headmaster Shukla
- Ayesha Raza Mishra as Jass's mother
- Kriti Sanon as Disha (cameo appearance)
- Varun Sood as Vishal (cameo appearance)

== Production ==
=== Development ===
During the COVID-19 pandemic, David Dhawan began drafting the script for his 46th directorial project. He collaborated with a team of young writers to align the script with modern sensibilities while maintaining his signature comedic style. In December 2023, it was reported that Varun Dhawan would reunite with his father and film director David Dhawan and producer Ramesh Taurani of Tips Films. This project marked their fourth film together following Main Tera Hero (2014), Judwaa 2 (2017) and Coolie No. 1 (2020). Production was scheduled to begin in April 2024 following the actor's commitments to Baby John (2024), which was estimated to be in the following April in India and abroad. The film is co-produced by Gaurav Bose of Maximilian Films (UK).

The film was described as a romantic comedy film. Yunus Sajawal wrote the screenplay and Farhad Samji penned the dialogues. The music was composed by the Tanishk Bagchi, Javed–Mohsin, Rony Ajnali, Gill Machhrai and Akshay–IP. The cinematography of the film was handled by Ayananka Bose and editing by Ritesh Soni. The production company made a public announcement on 10 July 2024, confirming the project and the official title Hai Jawani Toh Ishq Hona Hai. The title is a verse from the song "Ishq Sona Hai" from the 1999 film Biwi No. 1.

In April 2026, while promoting the film, director David Dhawan hinted that Hai Jawani Toh Ishq Hona Hai could be his final directorial venture. Citing health concerns and a desire to spend more time with family, he stated: "I don’t think I should do more. This might be my last film. after this, I'll just be Varun's father."

=== Casting ===
Pooja Hegde and Mrunal Thakur were announced as the female leads, in their maiden collaboration with Varun and David. Although reports suggested Sreeleela was being considered, producer Ramesh Taurani stated she was not even approached for a role. Maniesh Paul, Jimmy Sheirgill, Chunky Panday, Mouni Roy, Ali Asgar, Rajesh Kumar, Rakesh Bedi and Kubbra Sait were also part of the film as supporting casts.

=== Filming ===
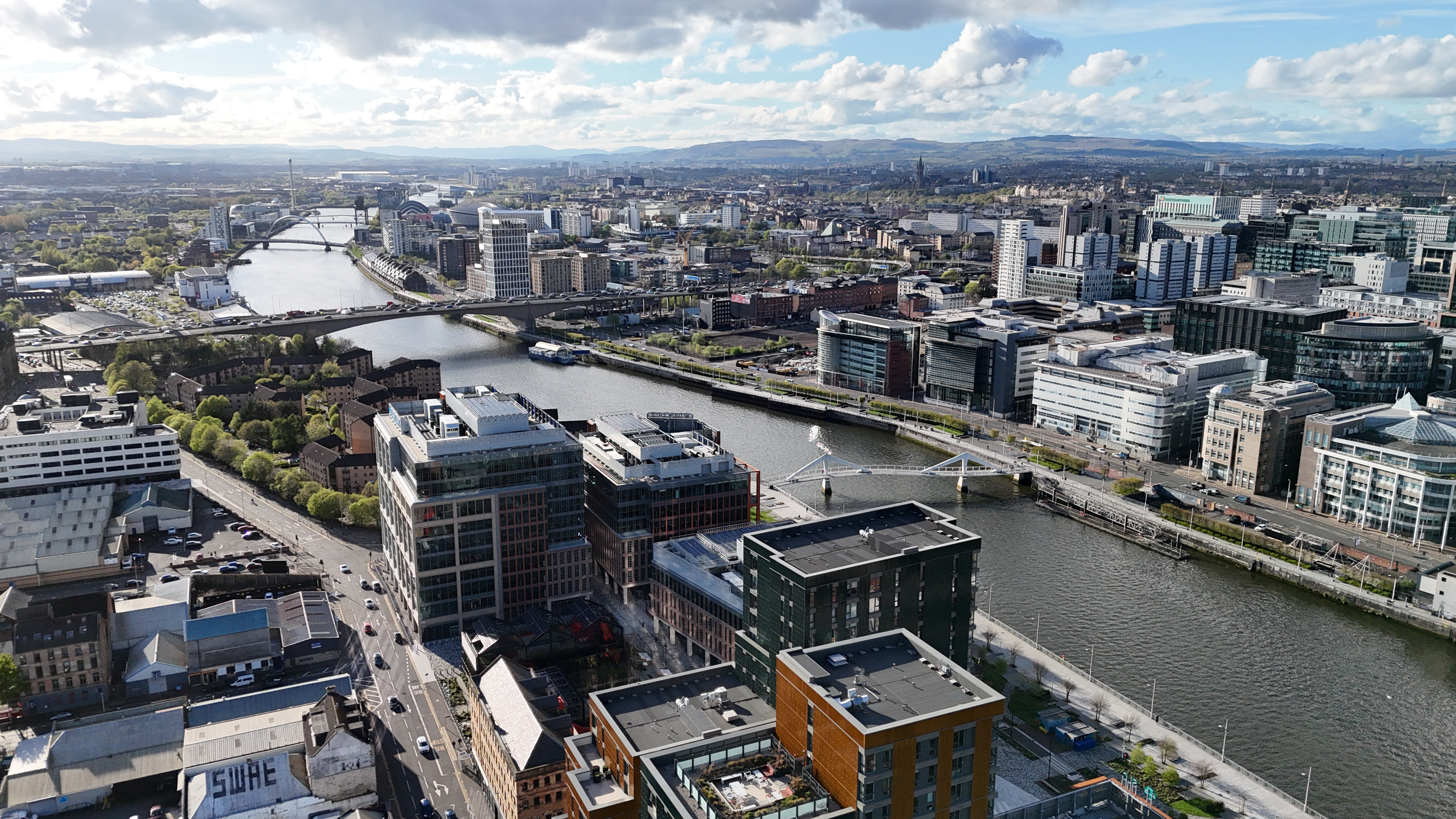
Glasgow, Scotland, where parts of the film were shot

Principal photography began with the first schedule on 12 July 2024 at Mehboob Studio in Mumbai, where a huge set was constructed. During this schedule, Varun sustained a rib-injury. The schedule was completed by 20 July. The next schedule was planned to begin in October, but was postponed due to David's hospitalisation. The second schedule commenced on 6 November in Goa. Following this schedule, a month long scheduled also happened at Mehboob Studios in Mumbai, till December. Hegde simultaneously filmed her portions in this schedule while filming her portions for Jana Nayagan, which were completed by 3 December.

Salman Khan visited the set during the filming of a song. Prior to the commencement of the third schedule in Rishikesh in late March 2025, Varun and Hegde participated in the sacred Ganga Aarti at Parmarth Niketan. The Rishikesh schedule began on 21 March, where river rafting scenes featuring Varun and Hegde were shot.

On 22 April 2025, Varun and Hegde headed to Glasgow in Scotland for a month-long schedule. Over half of the filming was reportedly completed by then. It was also reported that two song sequences, a key chase sequence and multiple comic sequences were shot in the schedule. Thakur joined the schedule on 30 April. A short schedule was held in the United Kingdom in early May. Mouni revealed through her social media accounts that she had begun filming her portions in Scotland on 3 May, and had completed then by 16 May. A dance number featuring the lead casts and choreographed by Remo D'Souza was shot across the streets of Edinburgh, Scotland. The Scotland schedule wrapped on 30 May 2025.

In September 2025, sequences featuring Varun, Hegde, Thakur and Rakesh Bedi was shot at The Irish House in the Fun Republic mall, Andheri. A carnival-style dance number for end-credit song featuring Varun, Hegde and Thakur was filmed in November 2025. The dance number, choreographed by Vijay Ganguly was shot with over 60 background dancers at a specially erected set at Mehboob Studios in Bandra. Principal photography wrapped by March 2026.

=== Post-production ===
Hegde began dubbing for her portions in late-March 2026. Thakur completed dubbing on 2 April 2026. The film was edited by Ritesh Soni. The film's music production was a rigorous process, with the title track being recreated in 48 hours, during which Varun Dhawan remained in the studio for two consecutive nights to ensure the energy of the vocals matched the onscreen performance.

== Soundtrack ==
Hai Jawani Toh Ishq Hona Hai

Soundtrack album by White Noise Collectives, Tanishk Bagchi, Javed–Mohsin, Rony Ajnali, Gill Machhrai and Akshay–IP
- Released: 10 June 2026
- Recorded: 2024–2026
- Genre: Feature film soundtrack
- Length: 16:42
- Label: Tips Music
- Producer: Ramesh Taurani

Singles from Hai Jawani Toh Ishq Hona Hai
- 1. "Vyah Karwado Ji" Released: 17 April 2026; 2. "WOW" Released: 24 April 2026; 3. "Tera Ho Jaun" Released: 8 May 2026; 4. "Chunnari Chunnari - Let's Go!" Released: 26 May 2026

The music is composed by White Noise Collectives, Tanishk Bagchi, Javed–Mohsin, Rony Ajnali, Gill Machhrai and Akshay–IP. Lyrics for the songs were written by Vayu Shrivastav, Jairaj, Mohsin Shaikh, Rony Ajnali, Gill Machhrai and IP Singh. The audio rights were acquired by Tips Music. The song "Hai Jawani Toh Ishq Hona Hai" was teased on 12 April 2026. It features a sample of "Ishq Sona Hai", composed by Anu Malik for Biwi No.1, also directed by David. Another song, "Chunnari Chunnari" from the same film was also remixed.

The first song "Vyah Karwado Ji" was released on 17 April 2026. The second single titled "WOW" was released on 24 April, coinciding Varun's birthday. Next single "Tera Ho Jaun" was released on 8 May 2026. The fourth single titled "Chunnari Chunnari - Let's Go" was released on 26 May.

Track listing
No.	Title	Lyrics	Music	Singer(s)	Length
1.	"WOW"	Rony Ajnali, Gill Machhrai	Tanishk Bagchi, Rony Ajnali, Gill Machhrai	Harrdy Sandhu, Kiran Bajwa	2:42
2.	"Chunnari Chunnari - Let's Go"	Sameer Anjaan, IP Singh	Akshay–IP, Anu Malik	IP Singh, Jonita Gandhi, Asees Kaur, Sudhir Yaduvanshi, Anuradha Sriram	2:45
3.	"Tera Ho Jaun"	Vayu	White Noise Collectives	Stebin Ben, Jonita Gandhi	2:40
4.	"Hai Jawani Toh Ishq Hona Hai (Title Track)"	Sameer Anjaan, Mohsin Shaikh	Javed–Mohsin, Anu Malik	Shankar Mahadevan, Hema Sardesai, RANJ, Earl Edgar	2:45
5.	"Vyah Karwado Ji"	Vayu	White Noise Collectives	Mika Singh, Asees Kaur	3:21
6.	"Padosan"	Jairaj	White Noise Collectives	Madhubanti Bagchi, Divya Kumar	2:29
Total length:					16:42

== Marketing ==
The makers released a surprise first-look still image of Varun and Hegde in beach in April 2026. Zoom praised it stating "they appear fantastic together in the image. Varun looks sharp in a white shirt paired with black shorts, while Pooja dazzles in her blue swimwear." A 1.5 minutes teaser was censored by the CBFC in early-April 2026 for theatrical screening. During the 2026 Indian Premier League, Varun Dhawan and Pooja Hegde attended the stadium to watch the match and for promotional activities of the film on 12 April 2026.

The film's teaser was initially scheduled to release on 13 April. However, following the demise of veteran singer Asha Bhosle, the makers unveiled the First Look Teaser on 14 April. Aishani Biswas of Outlook commented, "The teaser introduces what is described as a “double trouble” love story, pairing Dhawan with Pooja Hegde and Mrunal Thakur. Set against a colourful and fast-paced backdrop, the film appears to embrace the classic Bollywood rom-com formula while giving it a contemporary spin." The teaser featured AI-generated toddlers as a promotional gimmick created by a third-party creative agency. Murtuza Iqbal from Free Press Journal noted that "the first look is entertaining, especially because of the cute AI-generated kids. The makers have very smartly used the ongoing AI-generated kids trend for the promotion of their film."

On 29 April 2026, PVR INOX announced "The David Dhawan Film Festival", during which films directed by David Dhawan would be screened from May 2026 across multiple cities in India. The film festival included several of his earlier comedies and was organised in the lead-up to the release of Hai Jawani Toh Ishq Hona Hai, as part of its promotional campaign. In late-April, the cast promoted the film at Laughter Chefs Season 3. In May 2026, a video of Varun Dhawan ditching his luxury vehicle for an auto-rickshaw ride in Mumbai with the song "Wow" went viral. Media outlets characterised the actor's rickshaw ride as a publicity stunt to promote the film's soundtrack. Varun Sharma, Kriti Sanon, Stebin Ben and Nupur Sanon dancing to the song "Tera Ho Jaun" was shared on social media platforms. Following the successful reception of the film's songs, the official trailer was initially scheduled to be released on 21 May, but was postponed and released on 23 May 2026. The trailer launch event was held in Mumbai with the cast and crew.

== Release ==
=== Theatrical ===
Hai Jawani Toh Ishq Hona Hai was released worldwide on 5 June 2026. It was initially scheduled for release on 2 October 2025, but was delayed to April 2026 to allow more time for production to be completed.

=== Distribution ===
In April 2026, Tips Films has announced their re-entry into film distribution with the film, for a nationwide theatrical release. PVR Inox Pictures and Cinepolis will distribute the film in major territories while Tips Films will distribute the film in other areas.

== Reception ==
=== Critical reception ===
On the review aggregator website Rotten Tomatoes, 17% of 12 critics' reviews are positive, with an average rating of 4.6/10.

Chirag Sehgal of News18 rated 3.5 out of 5 stars and wrote that the film "sticks to the familiar David Dhawan playbook and delivers exactly what it promises, an entertaining theatrical experience filled with laughs, romance, confusion and nostalgia. The film is a satisfying watch for fans of commercial Bollywood entertainers." Bollywood Hungama rated 3.5 out of 5 stars and wrote, "On the whole, Hai Jawani Toh Ishq Hona Hai is a breezy, buoyant and unapologetically mainstream entertainer that plays firmly to David Dhawan’s strengths: broad humour, colourful characters, musical energy and an instinctive understanding of what makes audiences smile." Devesh Sharma of Filmfare rated 3 out of 5 stars and wrote that the film "feels like a time capsule from the era when he and Govinda ruled the box office with comedies that were loud, colourful, chaotic and proudly nonsensical."

Deccan Chronicle wrote that the film was a "fun-filled commercial entertainer that embraces its over-the-top nature and succeeds in delivering an enjoyable cinematic experience. If you're looking for a film that lets you switch off your brain, share a few laughs, and leave the theatre feeling lighter, this David Dhawan comedy is well worth a watch." Anuj Kumar of The Hindu wrote that the film "works overtime to make us submit to the rhythm of the ridiculous."

== Legal issues ==
In May 2026, a legal dispute emerged between Pooja Entertainment and Tips Music Limited over music and intellectual property rights tied to several Pooja Entertainment films, including Coolie No. 1 (1995), Hero No. 1 (1997), Biwi No.1 (1999), Bade Miyan Chote Miyan (1998), Tera Jadoo Chal Gayaa (2000), and Mujhe Kucch Kehna Hai (2001). The case also concerned the proposed use of songs in the film Hai Jawani Toh Ishq Hona Hai.

Pooja Entertainment approached the Court of Civil Judge in Katihar, Bihar, seeking to protect its rights. The court issued an interim status quo order, temporarily restricting any modified or commercial exploitation of the disputed tracks pending further hearings. Tips Music Limited denied the allegations, terming them "malicious and misconceived". The company maintained that it holds valid, long-standing agreements for the music rights and has legally exploited them for nearly three decades. On 22 May 2026, Tips Music Limited obtained relief from the Supreme Court of India, which stayed the lower court's order.

The dispute also led to speculation that the new film might be a remake of Biwi No. 1. In response, the makers of Hai Jawani Toh Ishq Hona Hai issued a public notice stating that it features an entirely original story and screenplay with no resemblance to any previous film.
