= Divya Kumar (singer) =

Indian playback singer

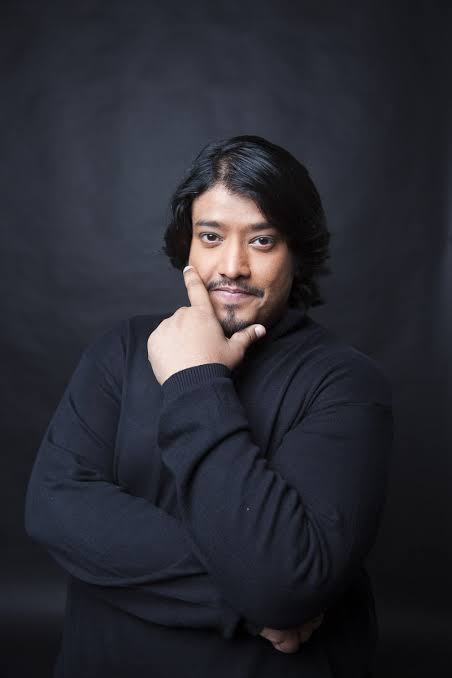
- Divya Kumar
- Born: Divya Kumar; India
- Occupation: Singer
- Years active: 2011–present

Divya Kumar is an Indian playback singer who has lent his voice in a number of Hindi, Gujarati, Telugu and other language films.

== Early life ==
Divya Kumar comes from a musical family. His grandfather, Pandit Shivram, was a composer for many regional films in India, and for V. Shantaram's films. His father, Bhagwan Shivram, is a musician and has recorded with RD Burman, Jatin–Lalit and Himesh Reshamiya.His Bollywood break was with Gujraj Singh on the film Tutiya Dil. Since then, he has gone on to sing some popular songs like "Shubhaarambh" for the film Kai Po Che, "Chanchal Man Ati Random" for the film Shuddh Desi Romance, and was featured on "Daingad Daingad" from the film Humpty Sharma ki Dulhania.

He also sang in the Farhan Akhtar starrer movie Bhaag Milkha Bhaag, singing "Maston Ka Jhund" (music by Shankar–Ehsaan–Loy). In 2013, he sang in Finding Fanny and Ghanchakkar, and was a part of MTV India's prestigious 'MTV Unplugged', which dedicated an entire episode to his hits. He has also appeared on MTV's other prestigious musical show "MTV Unplugged". He sang in a serial called Satrangi Sasural as a playback singer and the theme music composed by Sachin–Jigar. In 2017 he sung a title song for three international award-winning Rajasthani film Taawdo The Sunlight.

== Discography ==
=== Hindi ===
Key
†	Denotes films that have not yet been released

List of Hindi film credits
Year	Film	Song name	Composer	Co-singer(s)
2012	Tutiya Dil	"Alakh Niranjan"	Gulraj Singh	
2012	Ishaqzaade	"Aafton Ke Parindey"	Amit Trivedi	Suraj Jagan
2013	Kai Po Che	"Shubhaarambh"	Amit Trivedi	Shruti Pathak
2013	Ghanchakkar	"Allah Meherbaan"	Amit Trivedi	
2013	Bhaag Milkha Bhaag	"Maston Ka Jhund"	Shankar–Ehsaan–Loy	
2013	Shuddh Desi Romance	"Chancal Man Ati Random"	Sachin–Jigar	
2014	Finding Fanny	"Shake your Bootiya"	Sachin–Jigar	
2014	Happy Ending	"G Phaad Ke"	Sachin–Jigar	Shefali Alvares
2014	Happy Ending	"Paaji Tussi Such a Pussy Cat"	Sachin–Jigar	Amitabh Bhattacharya, Jigar Saraiya
2014	Humpty Sharma Ki Dulhania	"Daingad Daingad"	Udit Narayan, Akriti Kakkar, Pratibha Baghel, Deepali Sathe, Niharkia Sinha	
2014	Main Tera Hero	"Shanivaar Raati"	Sajid–Wajid	Arijit Singh, Shalmali Kholgade
2014	Shaadi Ke Side Effects	"Harry's Not a Brahmachari"	Pritam	Jazzy B, Ishq Bector
2014	Ekkees Toppon Ki Salaami	"Tod De Kataar"	Ram Sampath	Labh Janjua, Ram Sampath
2015	Badlapur	"Jee Karda"	Sachin–Jigar	
2015	Badlapur	"Jee Karda (Rock Version)"	Sachin–Jigar	
2015	Dolly Ki Doli	"Dolly Ki Doli - Title Track"	Sajid-Wajid	
2015	Runh	"Runh fitata fite na"	Sangeet-Siddharth	
2015	Manjhi - The Mountain Man	"Dum Kham"	Hitesh Sonik	
2015	Pyaar Ka Punchnama 2	"Moorakh"	Shaarib-Toshi	
2015	Dil Dhadakne Do	"Phir Bhi Yeh Zindagi"	Shankar–Ehsaan–Loy	Farhan Akhtar, Vishal Dadlani, Alyssa Mendonsa
2015	ABCD 2	"Sunn Saathiya"	Sachin–Jigar	Priya Saraiya
2015	ABCD 2	"Vande Mataram"	Sachin–Jigar	Daler Mehndi, Tanishka Sanghvi, Badshah
2015	ABCD 2	"Chunar"	Sachin–Jigar	Arijit Singh
2015	ABCD 2	"Hey Ghanraya"	Sachin–Jigar	
2015	Hero	"Jab We Met"	Sachin–Jigar	Rahul Pandey, Shalmali Kholgade, Jigar Saraiya
2015	Guddu Rangeela	"Guddu Rangeela (Title Track)"	Amit Trivedi	
2015	Baahubali (Dubbed version)	"Manohari"	M. M. Keeravani	Neeti Mohan
2015	Monsoon	"Sohni Kudi"	Biswajit Bhatacharjee	
2015	Shaandaar	"Raita Phail Gaya"	Amit Trivedi	
2015	Kis Kisko Pyaar Karoon	"Jugni Peeke Tight Hai (Version 1)"	Amjad-Nadeem	Kanika Kapoor
2015	Kis Kisko Pyaar Karoon	"Jugni Peeke Tight Hai (Version 2)"	Amjad-Nadeem	Sukriti Kakkar
2015	Meeruthiya Gangsters	"Babaji Ka Ghanta"		
2016	Housefull 3	"Pyar Ki Maa Ki"	Sharib-Toshi	Sharib-Toshi, Nakash Aziz, Anmol Malik, Earl Edgar
2016	Airlift	"Mera Nachan Nu"	Amaal Mallik	Brijesh Shandilya, Amaal Mallik
2016	Te3n	"Rootha"	Clinton Cerejo	Benny Dayal, Bianca Gomes
2016	Freaky Ali	" Din Mein Karengey Jagrata"	Sajid-Wajid	Swati Sharma, Wajid Khan
2016	Jai Gangaajal	"Binu Baadar"	Salim-Sulaiman	
2016	A Flying Jatt	"Bhangda Pa"	Sachin-Jigar	Vishal Dadlani, Asees Kaur
2016	A Flying Jatt	"Khair Mangda"	Sachin-Jigar	Atif Aslam
2017	Who is the first wife of my father	"Eso Jiya Main"		
2017	Simaran	" Majaa Ni Life"	Sachin-Jigar	Shalmali Kholgade
2017	Simaran	"Single Rehne De"	Sachin-Jigar	Shalmali Kholgade
2017	Bhoomi	"Will You Marry Me"	Sachin-Jigar	Jonita Gandhi
2017	Fukrey Returns	"Peh Gaya Khalara"	Jasleen Royal	Akasa Singh, Jasleen Royal, Akanksha Bhandari
2017	Flat 211	"Ek Din Chalegi Saali"	Prakash Prabhakar	
2017	Dil Jo Na Keh Saka	"Band Vyah Da Baje"	Shail-Pritesh	Pratibha Singh Baghel
2017	Lucknow Central	"Kavan Kavan"	Arjunna Harjai, Sukhwinder Singh	
2018	Veere Di Wedding	"Laaj Sharam"	White Noise	Jasleen Royal, Embee
2018	Bhavesh Joshi	"Chavanprash"	Amit Trivedi	Pragati Joshi, Arohi Mhatre
2018	3 Dev	"Ban Dance Mein Kutta"	Sajid–Wajid	Uvie & Shivi
2018	Parmanu: The Story of Pokhran	"Thare Vaaste"	Sachin–Jigar	
2018	Parmanu: The Story of Pokhran	"Kasumbi"	Sachin–Jigar	
2018	Gold	"Jaaga Hindustan"	Sachin–Jigar	
2018	Stree	"Kamariya"	Sachin–Jigar	Aastha Gill
2018	Fanney Khan	"Halka Halka"	Amit Trivedi	Sunidhi Chauhan
2018	Paltan	"Paltan Title Track"	Anu Malik	Irfan, Adarsh, Khuda Baksh
2018	Sui Dhaaga	"Sab Badiya Hain"	Anu Malik	
2018	When Obama Loved Osama	"Muft Ki Mila Bas"	Kashi Richard	Bhoomi Trivedi
2018	Loveyatri	"Loveyatri Title Track"	JAM8	Harjot Kaur, Ana Rehman
2018	Kaashi in Search of Ganga	"Bum Bum Bole Kaashi"	Vipin Patwa	Daler Mehndi, Swati Sharma
2018	Zero	"Issaqbaazi"	Ajay–Atul	Sukhwinder Singh
2018	Halkaa	"Halkaa Ho Ja Re"	Shankar-Ehsaan-Loy	Ankita Kundu
2018	Udanchhoo	"Money Money"	Atharva Joshi	
2019	Hume Tumse Pyaar Kitna	"Gehra Halka"	Jeet Gannguli	
2019	Super 30	"Basanti No Dance"	Ajay–Atul	Prem Areni, Janardhan Dhatrak & Chaitally Parmar
2019	Dabangg 3	"Hud Hud"	Sajid-Wajid	Shabab Sabri, Sajid Khan
2019	One Day: Justice Delivered	"Tooh Hila Lo"	Joy-Anjaan	Farhad, Tia Bajpai
2019	Ujda Chaman	"Chand Nikla"	Gourov-Roshin	
2019	Bala	"Tequila"	Sachin–Jigar	Jigar Saraiya
2020	Street Dancer 3D	"Gann Deva"	Sachin–Jigar	Sachin–Jigar
2020	Street Dancer 3D	"Mile Sur"	Sachin–Jigar	Navraj Hans, Shalmali Kholgade, Vayu Shrivastav, IP Singh
2020	Angrezi Medium	"Laadki"	Sachin–Jigar	
2020	Panga	"Panga - Title Track"	Shankar-Ehsaan-Loy	Harshdeep Kaur, Siddharth Mahadevan
2020	Jai Mummy Di	"Ajaa Ajaa"	Rishi-Siddharth	
2020	Khaali Peeli	"Shana Dil"	Vishal–Shekhar	
2020	Suraj Pe Mangal Bhari	"Dauda Dauda"	Javed-Mohsin	Mohsin Shaikh
2021	Roohi	"Panghat"	Sachin–Jigar	Asees Kaur, Sachin–Jigar and Rap by Mellow D
2021	Kya Meri Sonam Gupta Bewafa Hai?	"Wallpaper Maiyya Ka"		Payal Dev
2021	Sardar Ka Grandson	"Bandeya"	Tanishk Bagchi	
2021	Mera Fauji Calling	"Hum Apne Watan Pe Mar Gaye"	Sajjad Ali Chandwani	
2021	Toofaan	"Star Hai Tu"	Shankar–Ehsaan–Loy	Himani Kapoor, Siddharth Mahadevan
2021	Velle	"Raakh Ka Dariya"	Sohail Sen	
2022	Hai Tujhe Salaam India	"Beauty Pe Sity"	Sagar Bhatia	Shivani Bhatt
2022	HIT: The First Case	"Kahani Baki Hai"	Manan Bhardwaj	
2022	Jaadugar	"Game Ka Prem"	Nilotpal Bora	Nilotpal Bora
2022	Bhediya	"Thumkeshwari"	Sachin-Jigar	Ash King, Rashmeet Kaur
2022	Dasvi	"Macha Macha Re"	Sachin-Jigar	Mika Singh, MellowD
2023	Tu Jhoothi Main Makkaar	"Maine Pee Rakhi Hain"	Pritam	Shreya Ghoshal
2023	Fukrey 3	"Atrangi Kissa"	Sumeet Bellary	Gandharv Sachdev
2024	Ruslaan	"Dua-E-Khair"	Rajat Nagpal	
2024	Kaam Chalu Hai	"Ram Naam Satya Hai (Unplugged)"	Palash Muchhal	
2024	Ae Watan Mere Watan	"Julia"	Shashi-Suman	Shashi
2024	Dukaan	"Train Song"	Shreyas Puranik	Ananya Wadkar, Prajakta Shukre, Meenal Jain, Apurva Nisshad
2024	Kakuda	"Bhasma"	Gulraj Singh	
2024	Stree 2	"Aaj Ki Raat"	Sachin-Jigar	Madhubanti Bagchi
2024	Stree 2	"Aayi Nahi"	Sachin-Jigar	Pawan Singh, Simran Choudhary
2024	Vicky Vidya Ka Woh Wala Video	"Sajna Ve Sajna"	White Noise Collectives	Sunidhi Chauhan
2025	Raid 2	"Nasha"	White Noise Collectives	Jasmine Sandlas, Sachet Tandon, Sumontho Mukherjee
2025	Ground Zero	"Fateh"	Sunny and Inder Bawra	
2025	Jolly LLB 3	"Ichakdana"	Aman Pant	Aman Pant, Akhil Tiwari, Pardhaan
2025	Thamma	"Tum Mere Na Huye"	Sachin–Jigar	Madhubanti Bagchi, Rana Mazumder, Sumonto Mukherjee
2025	Thamma	"Poison Baby"	Sachin–Jigar	Jasmine Sandlas, Sumonto Mukherjee, Abhishek Singh, Noor Parmar, Hitesh Purani
2025	Ek Deewane Ki Deewaniyat	"Dil Dil Dil"	Rajat Nagpal	Sunidhi Chauhan
2026	Ikkis	"Biraadar Yamma Yamma"	White Noise Collectives	Sumontho Mukherjee

=== Telugu ===
List of Telugu film credits
Year	Film	Song	Composer(s)	Co-Singer(s)	Note(s)
2013	Baadshah	"Rangoli Rangoli"	S. Thaman		
2015	Surya vs Surya	"Preme Santosham"	Sai Karthik		
2015	Akhil	"Akkineni Akkineni"	Anup Rubens		
2015	Bajirao Mastani	"Mahalinga"	Sanjay Leela Bhansali		Dubbed
2015	Bajirao Mastani	"Gajanana"	Sanjay Leela Bhansali		Dubbed
2015	Kick 2	"Jenda Pai Kapiraju"	S. Thaman		
2016	Dictator	"Gam Gam Ganesha"	S. Thaman	Deepak, Sai Charan, Nivas	
2016	Krishnashtami	"Lefto Punjabi Dressu"	Dinesh	Mamta Sharma	
2017	Goutham Nanda	"Black & White"	S. Thaman		
2017	Jai Lava Kusa	"Raavana"	Devi Sri Prasad		
2017	Vunnadhi Okate Zindagi	"Rayyi Rayyi Mantu"	Devi Sri Prasad		
2017	Middle Class Abbayi	"Yevandoi Nani Garu"	Devi Sri Prasad		
2017	Sapthagiri LLB	"Are Are Ek Dham"			
2018	Padmaavat	"Jhommani Jhommani"	Sanjay Leela Bhansali		Dubbed
2018	Padmaavat	"Gaji Biji"	Sanjay Leela Bhansali		Dubbed
2018	Bharat Ane Nenu	"Vachaadayyo Saami"	Devi Sri Prasad		
2018	Thugs of Hindostan	"Vashmalle"	Ajay–Atul		Dubbed
2018	Thugs of Hindostan	"Majjare Khudha"	Ajay–Atul	Shreya Ghoshal, Sunidhi Chauhan	Dubbed
2019	Dabangg 3	"Hud Hud"	Sajid–Wajid		Dubbed
2020	Aswathama	"Title Song"	Sri Charan Pakala		

=== Gujarati ===
List of Gujarati film credits
Year	Film	Song name	Composer
2013	Happy Family Pvt Ltd	"Title Track"	Chhavi Sodhani Joshi, Advait Nemlekar
2014	Bey Yaar	"Peecha Raja"	Sachin–Jigar
2016	Wrong Side Raju!	"Gori Radha Ne Kado Kaan"	Sachin–Jigar
2017	Chor Bani Thangaat Kare	"Chor Bani Thangaat Kare (Title Track)"	Sachin–Jigar
2017	Colorbaaj	"Janam Janam"	Pallav Baruah
2018	Reva	"Title Track"	Amar Khandha
2018	Chhutti Jashe Chhakka	"Color Color Which Color?"	Kedar-Bhargav
2019	Baap Re Baap	"Andharya Raste"	Rajiv Bhatt
2022	Kehvatlal Parivar	"Holi Aavi Aavi"	Sachin–Jigar
2022	Aum Mangalam Singlem	"Khune Thi Khune Thi"	Sachin-Jigar
2024	Vanilla Ice Cream	"Harakhta Malakta"	Siddharth Amit Bhavsar
2025	Bachu Ni Benpani	"Jaatra E Jaay"	Siddharth Amit Bhavsar

=== Tamil ===
List of Tamil film credits
Year	Film	Song	Composer	Co-Singer(s)
2013	Naiyaandi	Munnadi	Ghibran	Shweta Mohan
2015	Paayum Puli	Siluku Marame	D. Imman	Shashaa Tirupati, Sharanya Gopinath
2016	Wagah	Sollathan Ninaikuran	D. Imman	
2021	Laabam	Yaamili Yaamiliya	D. Imman	

=== Rajasthani ===
List of Rajasthani film credits
Year	Film	Song	Composer
2017	Taawdo The Sunlight	Taawdo Title	Lalit Pandit

=== Marathi ===
- Chumbak – Title Track,
- Youngraad – Arz,
- Ziprya – Alibaba,
- Pyaar Wali Love Story – Jahan Jau,
- Govinda – Title Track,
- Hrun – Title Track,
- Katyar Kaljat Ghusali – Yaar Ilahi,
- Baapmanus- Title Track
- Fatteshikast - Woh Maseeha Aa Gaya
- Unaad – Hori Jayee Re
- Adkitta – Baby Bomb

=== Kannada ===
- Run Anthony – Run Run Run
- Victory 2 — Cheap & best
- Roberrt – Jai Shree Ram (2020)

=== Bengali ===
- Beparoyaa (2016) – Poran Bondhua,
- Badsha – The Don (2016) – Dhat Teri Ki
- Chengiz (2023) – Widda

=== Albums ===
List of musical album credits
Year	Song name	Album	Co-Singer	Language	Composer	Lyricist
2021	Vhalo Laage	Duet	Aishwarya Majmudar	Gujarati	Smit Desai	Sandipa Thesiya
