= Dev Negi =

Indian singer-songwriter

- Negi at 8th Mirchi Music Awards

Background information
- Born: 25 June 1989 (age 37); Dwarahat, Uttarakhand, India
- Genres: Filmi; Indi-pop; Hip hop; Indian Classical; R&B
- Occupations: Singer; Songwriter
- Instruments: Vocals; Piano
- Years active: 2013 – present

Dev Negi (born 25 June 1989) is an Indian singer-songwriter and a playback singer based in Mumbai, India. Negi has recorded numerous chartbuster songs for Hindi films, albums, television and TV commercials. The song Biba which is a collaboration of the international DJ Marshmello and music composer Pritam has been sung by Negi along with Shirley Setia & Pradeep Sran. His song Badri Ki Dulhania was one of the most viewed Indian songs on YouTube in 2017.

== Early life ==
Negi hails from a hilly town Dwarahat of Almora, Uttarakhand. He has done his schooling from a local state run intermediate school. During his childhood, he used to perform in school and local cultural events and he spent his maximum time in listening to Mohammed Rafi & Kishore Kumar's songs. According to Negi, he has learnt most of the music through listening and he too mentioned Rafi saab as an institution to him. After his schooling, he moved to Jalandhar, Punjab for higher education. Negi holds a bachelor's degree in music from Apeejay College of Fine Arts and he has learned Hindustani classical music from his guru Shri Vinod Verma ji. He trained his voice there in Jalandhar and by the end of 2010 he shifted to Mumbai.

== Career ==
Negi made his debut with the song "Aaja Ab Jee Le Zara" from the film Ankur Arora Murder Case in 2013. He sang "Hai Yehi Zindagi" (film version) for Sajid Nadiawala's Kick and the title track of Ungli in 2014. In 2015, he got noticed when his two film songs released consecutively, "Ho Gaya Hai Pyaar" from Tanu Weds Manu Returns and "Coffee Peetey Peetey" from Gabbar Is Back. These songs brought him fame but "Badri Ki Dulhania" in 2017 came out as a major milestone in his career. After that he recorded a list of major chartbusters including "Chalti Hai Kya 9 Se 12" from Judwaa 2, "Sweety Tera Drama" from Bareilly Ki Barfi, "Butterfly" from the film Jab Harry Met Sejal, "Sweatheart" from Kedarnath and many others. His song Naach Meri Jaan for the Salman Khan starrer Tubelight has the Kumaoni lyrics written by him. It was for the first time when Kumaoni language has been used in a mainstream Hindi film song. Negi has done rapping in the song "Rang Laal" from Force 2 along with John Abraham which perfectly depicts the emotions of every Indian, post the Uri terror attack and India's retaliatory surgical strike. Apart from the films, he has sung several title tracks for television including Mere Rang Mein Rangne Waali, Ek Boond Ishq, Beintehaa and Nisha Aur Uske Cousins. Besides, he has recorded songs for Punjabi, Marathi, Telugu, Bengali films. From then to now, he has shown his versatility by singing in different genres.

== Personal life ==
Negi was born in Dwarahat on 25 June 1989. His father is an ex-army man and a former boxer and his mother is a homemaker. Negi is the youngest among his siblings. Being born and brought up in a Kumaoni – Rajput family, he has no ancestral roots to the music. However, he feels the music is always there in the beauty of hills and that has always been a big inspiration to him. In an interview, he mentioned that the feel is the most important factor in singing, particularly in playback and that feel is there in his singing due to the hills.

== Discography ==
=== Hindi ===
==== Films ====
Year	Song	Film	Composer(s)	Lyricist(s)	Co-singer(s)
2025	Panwadi	Sunny Sanskari Ki Tulsi Kumari	A.P.S	Jairaj	Khesari Lal Yadav, Masoom Sharma, Siva G, Pritam, Nikhita Gandhi, Akasa Singh
2025	Zohra Jabeen	Sikandar	Pritam	Sameer Anjaan, Danish Sabri, MellowD	Nakash Aziz, MellowD
2025	Bam Bam Bole	Sikandar	Pritam	Sameer Anjaan	Shaan, Antara Mitra
2024	Dahiya	Luv Ki Arrange Marriage	Sandesh Shandilya	Anil Pandey	
2024	Satyanaas	Chandu Champion	Pritam	Amitabh Bhattacharya	Arijit Singh, Nakash Aziz
2023	Ki Farak Painda Hai	The Great Indian Family	Pritam	Amitabh Bhattacharya	Neeti Mohan
2023	Heart Throb	Rocky Aur Rani Kii Prem Kahaani	Pritam	Amitabh Bhattacharya	
2023	Bareilly Ki Bazzar	Chatrapathi	Tanishk Bagchi	Mayur Puri	Sunidhi Chauhan
2023	Window Taley	Chatrapathi	Tanishk Bagchi	Shabbir Ahmed	Jyotica Tangri
2022	Hypnotize	Middle Class Love	Himesh Reshammiya	Mayur Puri	Akasa Singh, Aasa Singh
2022	Mujh Mein Bas Jana	Prem Geet 3	Kalyan Singh	A. M. Turaz	Palak Muchhal
2022	"Laapata"	Cuttputlli	Aditya Dev	Rashmi Virag	Payal Dev
2022	Akdi Pakdi	Liger	Lijo George-DJ Chetas, Sunil Kashyap	Mohsin Shaikh	Pawni Pandey
2022	Kala Sha Kala	Rashtra Kavach Om	Amjad-Nadeem Amir, Enbee	Kumaar	Raahi
2022	Nikamma Title Track	Nikamma	Javed-Mohsin	Danish Sabri, Sanjay Chhel	Payal Dev, Deane Sequeira, Javed-Mohsin
2022	Tere Bin Kya	Nikamma	Gourov Dasgupta	Kumaar	Shruti Rane
2021	Kusu Kusu	Satyameva Jayate 2	Tanishk Bagchi	Tanishk Bagchi, Rashmi Virag	Zahrah S Khan
2021	Bansuri	Hum Do Hamare Do	Sachin-Jigar	Shellee	Asees Kaur, IP Singh
2021	Danka Baja	Mumbai Saga	Payal Dev	Prashant Ingole	
2020	Teri Bhabhi	Coolie No. 1	Javed - Mohsin	Danish Sabri	Neha Kakkar
2020	Deedar De	Chhalaang	Vishal–Shekhar	Panchhi Jalonvi	Asees Kaur
2020	LOL	Ginny Weds Sunny	Payal Dev	Kunaal Vermaa	Payal Dev
2020	Virgin Bhanupriya – Title Track	Virgin Bhanupriya	Saurabh-Vaibhav	Ajay Lohan	
2020	Bhankas	Baaghi 3	Tanishk Bagchi	Shabbir Ahmed	Bappi Lahiri, Jonita Gandhi
2019	Ankhiyon Se Goli Maare Returns	Pati Patni Aur Woh	Lijo George-DJ Chetas	Shabbir Ahmed	Asees Kaur
2019	Aa Paas Aa	X Ray: The Inner Image	Raaj Aashoo	Alka Khan	
2019	Prassthanam – Title Track	Prassthanam	Farhad Samji		
2019	Fikar Not	Chhichhore	Pritam	Amitabh Bhattacharya	Nakash Aziz, Amit Mishra, Antara Mitra, Sreerama Chandra, Amitabh Bhattacharya
2019	Zilla Hilela	Jabariya Jodi	Tanishk Bagchi	Tanishk Bagchi, Shabbir Ahmed	Monali Thakur, Raja Hassan
2019	Dilbar Jaani	India's Most Wanted	Amit Trivedi	Amitabh Bhattacharya	Nikhita Gandhi
2019	Mumbai Dilli Di Kudiyaan	Student of the Year 2	Vishal–Shekhar	Vayu	Payal Dev
2019	Theme Song	Total Dhamaal	Gourov-Roshin	Kumaar	
2019	Paisa Yeh Paisa	Total Dhamaal	Gourov-Roshin	Kunwar Juneja	Shubro Ganguly, Arpita Chowkrabarty
2018	Aala Re Aala	Simmba	Tanishk Bagchi	Shabbir Ahmed	Goldie
2018	Sweetheart	Kedarnath	Amit Trivedi	Amitabh Bhattacharya	
2018	Sajan Bade Senti	Badhaai Ho	JAM8	Vayu	Harjot Kaur
2018	Rang Taari	Loveyatri	Tanishk Bagchi	Shabbir Ahmed, Yo Yo Honey Singh, Hommie Dilliwala	Yo Yo Honey Singh
2018	Gayee Kaam Se	Laila Majnu	Joi Barua	Irshad Kamil	Amit Sharma, Meenal Jain
2018	Pyar Le Pyar De	Genius	Himesh Reshammiya	Shabbir Ahmed	Ikka Singh, Iulia Vantur
2017	Chalti Hai Kya 9 Se 12	Judwaa 2	Anu Malik Sandeep Shirodkar	Dev Kohli	Neha Kakkar
2017	Sweety Tera Drama	Bareilly Ki Barfi	Tanishk Bagchi	Shabbir Ahmed, Pravesh Mallick	Pawni Pandey, Shraddha Pandit, Pravesh Mallick
2017	Butterfly	Jab Harry Met Sejal	Pritam	Irshad Kamil	Sunidhi Chauhan, Aman Trikha, Nooran Sisters
2017	Naach Meri Jaan	Tubelight	Pritam	Amitabh Bhattacharya	Kamaal Khan, Nakash Aziz, Tushar Joshi
2017	Badri Ki Dulhania (Title Track)	Badrinath Ki Dulhania	Tanishk Bagchi	Shabbir Ahmed	Neha Kakkar, Monali Thakur, Ikka
2016	Rang Laal	Force 2	Gourov-Roshin	Kumaar	Aditi Sharma, John Abraham
2016	Dil Ye Khamakha	Saansein	Vivek Kar	Kumaar	
2016	Tum Mere	One Night Stand	Vivek Kar	Kumaar	
2015	Tujhse Door	Love Exchange	Jaidev Kumar	Kumaar	Javed Bashir, Shipra Goyal, Sanj V
2015	Automatic	Love Exchange	Jaidev Kumar	Kumaar	Ishmeet Narula
2015	Paro	Pyaar Ka Punchnama 2	Hitesh Sonik	Kumaar	Shipra Goyal
2015	Yadaan Teriyaan (Duet)	Hero	Jassi Katyal	Kumaar	Shipra Goyal
2015	Ho Gaya Hai Pyar	Tanu Weds Manu Returns	Krsna Solo	Raj Shekhar	
2015	Coffee Peetey Peetey	Gabbar Is Back	Chirantan Bhatt	Kumaar	Paroma Dasgupta
2014	Ungli Pe Nachalein	Ungli	Aslam Keyi	Kumaar	Shipra Goyal
2014	Hai Yehi Zindagi	Kick	Meet Bros. Anjjan	Kumaar	
2013	Delhi Delhi	Zindagi 50 50	Vivek Kar	Dev Negi Vivek Kar	
2013	Teri High High Heels	Mere Dad Ki Maruti	Sachin Gupta	Kumaar	
2013	Red Red Laali	Mere Dad Ki Maruti	Sachin Gupta	Kumaar	
2013	Maa Da Karz	Mere Dad Ki Maruti	Sachin Gupta	Kumaar	
2013	Aaja Ab Jee Le Jara	Ankur Arora Murder Case	Chirantan Bhatt	Kausar Munir	Deepali Sathe

==== Non-film ====
Year	Title	Work	Composer(s)	Co-singer(s)	Lyricist(s)	Ref(s)
2025	Chal Hum Dono	Chal Hum Dono - Single	Sunil Devbanshi		Deepak Jeswal	
2022	"Kesariyo Rang"	Non-album single	Lijo George, DJ Chetas	Asees Kaur	Kumaar	
2022	"Mashooka"	Non-album single	Tanishk Bagchi	Asees Kaur	Ullumanati, Yash Narvekar	
2022	Kya Fark Padta Hai	Kya Fark Padta Hai - Single	Pawan Muradpuri		Ayaz Gorakhpuri	
2021	Iss Pyar Ko	Moods With Melodies			Himesh Reshammiya	
2021	Iss Tarah Aashiqui Ka	Iss Tarah Aashiqui Ka - Single	Chirantann Bhatt		Manoj Yadav	
2020	Raja Ganpati (feat. Asees Kaur, Deedar Kaur)	Raja Ganpati – Single	Tanishk Bagchi	Asees Kaur, Deedar Kaur	Rashmi Virag	
2020	Kahin Ka Na Chorha	Kahin Ka Na Chorha – Single	Bharat Goel		Siddhant Kaushal	
2019	Choodiyan (feat. Jackky Bhagnani & Dytto)	Choodiyan — Single	Tanishk Bagchi	Asees Kaur	Shabbir Ahmed	
2019	Zaroori To Nahi	Zaroori To Nahi – Single	Dev Negi		Saba Akbarabadi, Amit Sharma	
2019	BIBA (feat. Marshmello & Pritam)	BIBA – Single	Marshmello & Pritam	Shirley Setia & Pradeep Sran		
2019	Psycho	Psycho – Single	Rajjat Sharma		Dev Negi	
2018	Yeh Kya Hua	Broken But Beautiful	Rana Mazumdar	Shreya Ghosal	Amitabh Bhattacharya	
2018	Side Wala Hero	SideHero	Vayu		Vayu	
2017	Tujhme Hi Mera Jahaan	Tujhme Hi Mera Jahaan – Single	Aslam Keyi		B K Samant	
2017	Roke Na Ruke / Mast Magan (with Tulsi Kumar)	T-Series Mixtape				
2016	Pukarta Chala Hoon	The Jam Room				
2016	Din Dhal Jaye	The Jam Room				
2016	Jeevan Ke Har Mod Pe	The Jam Room		Paroma Das Gupta		

=== Other languages ===
Year	Language	Song	Work	Composer(s)	Co-singer(s)	Lyricist(s)	Notes
2022	Telugu	"Mashooka"	Non-album single	Tanishk Bagchi	Aditya Iyengar	Ramajogayya Sastry	Non-album single
2022	Tamil	"Mashooka"	Non-album single	Tanishk Bagchi	Aditya Iyengar	Madhan Karky	Non-album single
2021	Bengali	Baare Baare	Baazi	Jeet Gannguli	Nikhita Gandhi	Pratik Kundu	
2019	Bengali	Jurajuri (জুরাজুরি)	Oriplast Originals	Protijyoti Ghosh	Anushree Gupta	Ritam Sen, Sambalpuri Folk Lyrics – Binod Pasayat	
2019	Bengali	Jamai Badal Title Song	Jamai Badal	Jeet Gannguli	Payal Dev	Priyo Chattopadhyay	
2018	Bengali	Masha Allah	Sultan: The Saviour	Savvy	Akriti Kakkar	Raja Chanda	
2018	Bengali	Chai Na Kichui	Inspector Notty K	Suddho Roy	Shweta Pandit	Priyo Chatterjee	
2017	Bengali	Hawai Hawai	Jio Pagla	Jeet Gannguli	Monali Thakur	Prasenjit Mallick	
2017	Bengali	Chaap Nishna	Shrestha Bangali	Anjjan Bhattacharya	Mamta Sharma Anjjan Bhattacharya	Lipi Katiha	
2017	Bengali	Jaya Tomari	Chaamp	Jeet Gannguli	Raja Chanda	Raja Chanda	
2015	Marathi	Deva Ganesha	Yudh.. Astitvachi Ladai	Vivek Kar	Adarsh Shinde Pratap	Jaffer Sagar	
2015	Marathi	Chal Door Door (Unplugged)	Yudh.. Astitvachi Ladai	Vivek Kar		Jaffer Sagar	
2013	Punjabi	Teri Meri Jodi	Haani	Jaidev Kumar	Shipra Goyal	Kumaar	
