= Javed–Mohsin =

Indian film music composer duo

Javed Mohsin
- Born: Javed Khan and Mohsin Shaikh; Mumbai, Maharashtra
- Occupation: Indian Music composer
- Years active: 2012–present
- Labels: Sony Music India; Eros Music; Zee Music; T-Series; Indie Music Label; Divo Music
- Website: http://javedmohsin.com/

Javed–Mohsin is an Indian film music composer duo consisting of Javed Khan and Mohsin Shaikh known for movies like Munna Michael, Julie 2, Jalebi and Drive. Javed- Mohsin are the first cousins related from their maternal side. Javed Khan's father was a tabla player Late Ustad Sharafat Ali Khan and Mohsin Shaikh's father is a writer Mustafa Shaikh. Javed–Mohsin's maternal grandfather was Late Ustad Fayyaz Ahmed Khan from Kirana Gharana (house of Indian classical music).

== Career ==
Javed- Mohsin started their journey into music by scoring music for ads, jingle and radio spot music in 2012. In 2015, Javed–Mohsin did their debut as a Bollywood Film Music composer, by composing original song "Dj Bajega Toh Pappu Nachega" for director duo Abbas-Mustan for their film Kis Kisko Pyaar Karoon starring Kapil Sharma, Elli AvrRam, Arbaaz Khan. Other than this the duo has composed songs for Munna Michael, Julie 2, Jalebi and Drive. Besides the film, the duo has composed songs for album Dil Mera Blast sung by Darshan Raval under Indie Music level. They have also composed for T-series albums Meri maa and Saara India with singer Jubin Nautiyal and Danish Sabri respectively.

== Filmography ==
Year	Film	Song	Singer	Music label
2015	Kis Kisko Pyaar Karoon	"DJ Bajega to Pappu Nachega"	Wajid, Ritu Pathak, Shalmali Kholgade	Zee Music
2017	Munna Michael	"Ding Dang"	Amit Mishra, Antara Mitra	Eros
2017	Julie 2	"Maala Seenha"	Mamta Sharma, Shabab Sabri, Danish Sabri	Divo Music
2018	Jalebi	"Pal"	Arijit Singh, Shreya Ghoshal	Sony Music India
2018	Jalebi	"Pal" (Female Solo)	Shreya Ghoshal	Sony Music India
2019	Drive	"Black Car"	Suraj Chauhan, Shivi, Ariff Khan	Zee Music
2019	Drive	"Tu Jaanta Nahi"	Parry G, Ceazer	Zee Music
2020	Suraj Pe Mangal Bhari	"Basanti"	Payal Dev, Danish Sabri,	Zee Music
2020	Suraj Pe Mangal Bhari	"Waareya" (Male Solo Version)	Vibhor Parashar	Zee Music
2020	Suraj Pe Mangal Bhari	"Ladki Dramebaaz Hai"	Mohsin Shaikh, Jyotica Tangri, MellowD, Aishwarya Bhandari	Zee Music
2020	Suraj Pe Mangal Bhari	"Dauda Dauda"	Divya Kumar, Mohsin Shaikh (Rap)	Zee Music
2020	Suraj Pe Mangal Bhari	"Waareya" (Duet Version)	Vibhor Parashar, Palak Muchhal	Zee Music
2020	Coolie No. 1	"Teri Bhabhi"	Dev Negi, Neha Kakkar	Zee Music
2021	Shershaah	"Kabhi Tumhe"	Darshan Raval	Sony Music India
2021	Shershaah	"Kabhi Tumhe" (Female Version)	Palak Muchhal	Sony Music India
2022	Nikamma	"Nikamma"	Dev Negi, Payal Dev, Deane Sequeira, Javed-Mohsin	Sony Music India
2022	Nikamma	"Ab Meri Bari"	Farhad Bhiwandiwala, Javed-Mohsin	Sony Music India
2024	Savi	"Paas Tere Main"	Jubin Nautiyal, Shreya Ghoshal	T-Series
2025	Dhadak 2	"Bas Ek Dhadak"	Jubin Nautiyal, Shreya Ghoshal	Zee Music
2025	Dhadak 2	"Tu Meri Dhadak Hai"	Vishal Mishra	Zee Music
2026	Hai Jawani Toh Ishq Hona Hai	"Hai Jawani Toh Ishq Hona Hai - Title Track"	Shankar Mahadevan, Hema Sardesai, RANJ, Earl Edgar	Tips Music

=== Non-film albums ===
Javed–Mohsin have scored music for some albums as music directors.

Year	Album	Singer	Music label
2019	Dil Mera Blast	Darshan Raval	Indie Music Label
2020	Meri Maa	Jubin Nautiyal	T-Series
2020	Saara India	Payal Dev	T-Series
2021	Pyaar Karte Ho Na	Shreya Ghoshal & Stebin Ben	VYRLOriginals
2022	Baarish Aayi Hai	Shreya Ghoshal & Stebin Ben	VYRLOriginals
2023	Barsaat Aa Gayi	Shreya Ghoshal & Stebin Ben	VYRLOriginals
2023	Zihaal e Miskin	Shreya Ghoshal & Vishal Mishra	VYRLOriginals
2023	Ek Mulaaqat	Shreya Ghoshal & Vishal Mishra	T-Series
2024	Tumhari Mohabbat	Chinmayi Sripada & Stebin Ben	DRJ Records
2024	Zihaal e Miskin (Acoustic)	Shreya Ghoshal	VYRLOriginals
