= Suraj Pe Mangal Bhari =

2020 Indian film by Abhishek Sharma

- Theatrical release poster
- Directed by: Abhishek Sharma
- Written by: Rohan Shankar
- Story by: Shokhi Banerjee
- Produced by: Zee Studios; Shariq Patel; Abhishek Vyas
- Starring: Manoj Bajpayee; Diljit Dosanjh; Fatima Sana Shaikh
- Cinematography: Anshuman Mahaley
- Edited by: Rameshwar S. Bhagat
- Music by: Songs: Javed-Mohsin; Kingshuk Chakravarty; Background Score: Kingshuk Chakravarty
- Production company: Zee Studios
- Distributed by: Zee Studios
- Release date: 15 November 2020
- Running time: 141 minutes
- Country: India
- Language: Hindi
- Box office: est. ₹4.32 crore

Suraj Pe Mangal Bhari (transl. Mars eclipses the Sun) is a 2020 Indian Hindi-language satire comedy film directed by Abhishek Sharma and produced by Zee Studios. The film stars Manoj Bajpayee, Diljit Dosanjh and Fatima Sana Shaikh in leading roles.

It was theatrically released on 15 November 2020 coinciding with Diwali amid the 50% occupancy theatrical guideline owing to COVID-19 pandemic in India.

== Plot ==
Suraj Singh Dhillon is a rich young lad who is quite desperate to get married. He looks after his father Gurnam's dairy, but due to his raw mannerisms, he is unable to impress any girl proposed to his family for an arranged marriage. His friend Sukhi, a filmy buff, suggests that he should create a bad boy image to woe girls as shown in the latest flicks. Both go on a bad boy drive, breaking many rules and giving rise to varying comical instances. Unknown to them, this is all recorded by a private detective Madhu Mangal Rane, who is known to perform background checks on prospective grooms.

When Suraj and his family meet the next prospective bride, her family shows them the photographs of his bad-boy drive and rejects his proposal. Gurnam feels disgraced and leaves the house. Suraj then catches hold of Pandit Dubey, who had earlier proposed this relation, and learns of Mangal's involvement. He decides to avenge the humiliation of his family and goes after Mangal.

Mangal belongs to a middle-class family and lives with his younger sister Tulshi and his mother Rekha in a chawl. Tulshi is considered the epitome of traditional girls with good moral values as per contemporary standards by one and all. Suraj and Sukhi first do a recce of Mangal's office in disguise, and then, late in the night, raid his office. Tulshi, who has just returned from her late-night tuitions, sees intruders in his office and enters to check out what is happening. Sukhi immediately runs away, but Suraj's coat gets stuck in the door. Their eyes meet for the first time and Suraj is immediately struck by her beauty. When her family and neighbours gather at the office, Mangal correctly suspects that Suraj has been here when he sees his photo and file missing from the office.

To avenge this nightly raid, Mangal mixes water in Suraj's milk cans the next day. Later, Suraj gets hold of a family photo featuring Mangal which they had earlier stolen from his office and learns that Tulshi is Mangal's sister. He chases her and they meet at a cosmetics store and they have a casual chat. Suraj had damaged her moped earlier, and he tells her that he would get it repaired. On this pretext, he drops her home and obtains her phone number. The next day he takes her on a date on the pretext of handing over her moped back. Tulshi also starts warming up to his romantic advances. Mangal meanwhile, has found two suitors for her and most likely she would marry one of them. Tulshi reluctantly agrees with her brother as most traditional girls are expected to marry a suitor usually selected by someone elder in her family.

As their relationship becomes stronger, Tulshi decides to reveal her profession to Suraj. She leads him and Sukhi to tuition class where she is supposed to teach, but exits from another door to a discotheque. Later they see her on stage in a fully modern avatar, completely contrary to her traditional personality, as a DJ. Suraj and Sukhi both enjoy her music, and Sukhi sees an opportunity for Suraj to get even with Mangal.

The next day the first suitor calls Mangal to reject his proposal after seeing Tulshi's DJ avatar in the newspaper. Mangal is thoroughly shocked and cannot come to terms that he was completely unaware of his sister's profession which is considered unacceptable in contemporary society and prohibits Tulshi from pursuing her DJ activity. She is deeply hurt by this and seeks solace with Suraj, whose confession pushes her into further grief. Suraj, with persistent efforts, is able to win back her trust. On the other side, Mangal comes to terms with his defeat and plans another act to get revenge. He meets Suraj's parents and proposes Tulshi's marriage to Suraj which everyone agrees to, despite Tulshi and Suraj doubting this sudden change of heart.

On the day of their engagement, Mangal tricks Gurnam into talking about dowry, which he records, and has the Dhillons arrested for dowry. Tulshi is heartbroken yet again as she cannot approve Suraj asking for dowry and resigns her fate to Mangal, who arranges her meeting with the second suitor he had spoken earlier and their marriage is fixed in haste.

After seeking bail, Suraj discovers that Mangal is in a romantic relationship with a woman, Kavya, who is married to an OCD-esque maths professor Chinmay Godbole. Seeking revenge, Suraj produces evidence of adultery to Chinmay and asks him to press charges of adultery against Mangal, which he refuses because he hates the courts where nothing is in order. Suraj realises Kavya's plight and then tortures Chinmay by putting everything in sight out of order, forcing him to sign the divorce papers.

On the day of Tulshi's marriage, Kavya rushes to Mangal and tells him that Suraj made her husband sign the divorce papers. Mangal, who was unsure of the match from the beginning, realises his mistake and apologises to Tulshi and Rekha, and they flee from the marriage. They go to the railway station where Suraj is returning with his parents to their native place forever to escape from the humiliation of their dowry charges. Out of desperation, Mangal pulls the emergency chain to stop it and searches for Suraj. He is able to finally reunite Tulshi and Suraj, but the TTE charges him for stopping the train. As Mangal has forgotten to carry his wallet, he is unable to pay the fine; when the Dhillons refuse as well, Mangal is sent to jail.

== Cast ==
- Manoj Bajpayee as Detective Madhu Mangal Rane
- Diljit Dosanjh as Suraj Singh Dhillon
- Fatima Sana Shaikh as Tulsi Rane aka Tina
- Annu Kapoor as Shantaram Kaka
- Supriya Pilgaonkar as Rekha Rane
- Vijay Raaz as Chinmay Godbole
- Seema Pahwa as Yeshodha Dhillon
- Manoj Pahwa as Gurnam Singh Dhillon
- Neeraj Sood as Pandit Dubey Ji
- Neha Pendse as Kavya Godbole
- Abhishek Banerjee as Dinesh
- Ujjwal Gauraha as DJ Chetas
- Karishma Tanna in a special appearance in the song "Basanti"

== Production ==
The principal photography began on 6 January 2020 but was halted in March 2020 owing to COVID-19 pandemic in India before resuming in July 2020.

== Soundtrack ==
Suraj Pe Mangal Bhari

Soundtrack album by Javed - Mohsin and Kingshuk Chakravarty
- Released: 5 November 2020
- Recorded: 2020
- Genre: Feature film soundtrack
- Length: 21:24
- Language: Hindi
- Label: Zee Music Company

Official audio
- Suraj Pe Mangal Bhari - Full Album on YouTube

The film's music was composed by Javed - Mohsin and Kingshuk Chakravarty while lyrics written by Danish Sabri, Kunaal Vermaa, Abhishek Sharma and Mellow D. The song 'Bad Boys' was inspired from a Tamil song, Love Pannalama' by STR and the Snoop Dogg song 'The Episode'.

Track listing
| No. | Title | Lyrics | Music | Singer(s) | Length |
|---|---|---|---|---|---|
| 1. | "Basanti" | Danish Sabri | Javed - Mohsin | Payal Dev, Danish Sabri | 3:04 |
| 2. | "Waareya" (Male Solo Version) | Kunaal Vermaa | Javed–Mohsin | Vibhor Parashar, Javed–Mohsin | 3:13 |
| 3. | "Ladki Dramebaaz Hai" | Danish Sabri | Javed–Mohsin | Mohsin Shaikh, Jyotica Tangri, Mellow D, Aishwarya Bhandari | 3:11 |
| 4. | "Dauda Dauda" | Danish Sabri | Javed–Mohsin | Divya Kumar, Javed-Mohsin; Rap: Mohsin Shaikh | 2:45 |
| 5. | "Waareya" (Duet Version) | Kunaal Vermaa | Javed - Mohsin | Vibhor Parashar, Palak Muchhal, Javed-Mohsin | 4:35 |
| 6. | "Suraj Pe Mangal Bhari" | Abhishek Sharma | Kingshuk Chakravarty | Sanj V, Chinmayi Tripathi | 2:47 |
| 7. | "Bad Boys" | Mellow D | Kingshuk Chakravarty | Mellow D | 1:49 |
| Total length: | | | | | 21:24 |

== Release ==
It was theatrically released on 15 November 2020 coinciding with Diwali amid the 50% occupancy theatrical guideline owing to COVID-19 pandemic in India.

=== Home media ===
The film was made available to stream on OTT platform ZEE5 on 25 March 2021 after being on Zee Plex from 4 December 2020.

== Reception ==
On the review aggregator website Rotten Tomatoes, 55% of 11 critics' reviews are positive, with an average rating of 5/10.

Kunal Guha of Mumbai Mirror rated 3/5 and wrote, "If you’re in the market for a feature film that doesn’t employ your brains too much but leaves you largely satisfied, this one won’t disappoint." Keyur Seta of Cinestaan rated 3/4 and wrote, "The love angle between Suraj and Tulshi, an important pillar of the story, turns out to be the only major weak link since the two fall in love in a jiffy. Of all the creative liberties taken here, this is one that you find most hard to accept. But with the negatives vastly outnumbered by the positives, the end result is an ideal Diwali entertainer. Go for it, but without forsaking safety." Times of india reporter Pallabi Dey Purkayastha rated 3.5/5 and wrote," Suraj Pe Mangal Bhaari’ is a witty satire – on the gori-kaali hangover, what qualifies as good or bad behaviour in today's world and how little soothsayers know about marriages." Pradeep Kumar of The Hindu entertainment journalist wrote, "Perhaps, it is time that film industries in India woke up to the fact that COVID-19 has brought in the acceptance among audiences on the type of films that deserves to be watched on the big screen. The ones that bet on witty dialogues and entertainingly sketched scenes for success can very well stand the test of time even if they are viewed on a mobile screen." Nairita Mukherjee of India Today rated 3/5 and wrote, "Suraj Pe Mangal Bhari offers some genuine laughs and some equally genuine performances by a stellar cast."

Shaheen Irani of DNA India entertainment editor rated 4/5 and said, "Go watch it in theatres and take your family along. You won't be disappointed. Also, wait for the credit scenes, for they will keep you longing for more."

Anna M. M. Vetticad from Firstpost rated 2.5 and said, "Suraj Pe Mangal Bhari is funny – very funny – up to a point. It is also intermittently political, inconsistent and not half as sharp as it set out to be."

A critic for Bollywood Hungama rated 3/5 and says, "Suraj Pe Mangal Bhari is a decent entertainer and a clean family film that works because of its plot, the depiction of the mid-90s era and the performances."

Khaleej Times entertainment news editor wrote, "If it’s laughs you are looking out for then Suraj Pe Mangal Bhari is bound to give you a rollicking time at the cinemas."

Subhash K. Jha of SpotboyE rated 3/5 and wrote "Suraj Pe Mangal Bhari Is Fun While It Lasts. Thanks to Manoj Bajpayee and Diljit Dosanjh whose killer vibes for one another give the comedy the fuel and the fire that it needs to sustain itself to the very end"
