= Payal Dev =

Indian singer and composer (born 1989)

- Born: 26 February 1989 (age 37); Ramgarh, Bihar (present-day Jharkhand), India
- Occupations: Playback singer, composer
- Years active: 2013–present
- Spouse: Aditya Dev
- Website: Official website

Payal Dev is an Indian playback singer and music composer who sings and composes music for Hindi films. She sang "Ab Tohe Jane Na Doongi" from the film Bajirao Mastani, as well as "Bhare Bazaar" from Namaste England. Dev made her debut as a composer in the song "Dil Jaaniye" for the film Khandaani Shafakhana. She also achieved success in composing Tum Hi Aana for the film Marjaavaan. She is also known for her rendition of the song "Genda Phool" with Badshah which has 955 million views as of June 2023 on YouTube. In 2021, Dev sang "Baarish Ban Jaana". The song reached 622 million views on YouTube.

== Discography ==
†	Denotes films that have not yet been released

=== Film songs ===
Year	Film	Song	Singer(s)/Co-singer(s)	Composer(s)	Languages	Notes
2013	Mai	"Learn To Adjust"	Arjun Kanungo	Nitin Shankar	Hindi	
2013	Navratri Mananey Aao Bhakton Maa Kaatyayani Ke Dware	"Jagdamba Sherawali"	Solo	Sanjeev–Darshan	Gujarati	Gujrati film
2013	Navratri Mananey Aao Bhakton Maa Kaatyayani Ke Dware	"Meri Maiya Kaatyayani" (Female Version)	Solo	Sanjeev–Darshan	Gujarati	Gujrati film
2013	Grand Masti	"Grand Masti (Title Track)"	Sanjeev-Darshan	Sanjeev–Darshan	Hindi	
2015	Bajirao Mastani	"Ab Tohe Jane Na Doongi"	Shreyas Puranik	Sanjay Leela Bhansali	Hindi	
2015	Bajirao Mastani	"Mannan Thirumbum Naaladi"	Deepti Rege, Archana Gore, Pragati Joshi, Arun Ingle, Kaustubh Datar, Mani Iyer	Sanjay Leela Bhansali	Tamil	Tamil Dub
2015	Bajirao Mastani	"Jayebheri"	Shashi Suman, Kunal Pandit, Prithvi Gandharv, Rashi Raagga, Gitika Manjrekar, Kanika Joshi	Sanjay Leela Bhansali	Telugu	Telugu Dub
2016	Cute Kameena	"Twinkle Twinkle"	Arghya Banerjee	Krsna Solo	Hindi	
2016	Great Grand Masti	"Lipstick Laga Ke"	Shaan	Superbia (Shaan, Gourov-Roshin)	Hindi	
2016	Freaky Ali	"Ya Ali Murtaza" (Qawwali)	Wajid, Danish Sabri	Sajid–Wajid	Hindi	
2016	Tum Bin II	"Dil Nawaziyaan"	Arko Pravo Mukherjee	Ankit Tiwari	Hindi	
2016	1920 London	"Rootha Kyun"	Mohit Chauhan	Shaarib-Toshi	Hindi	
2016	Veerappan	"Veer Veer Veerappan"	Toshi Sabri, Vee	Shaarib-Toshi	Hindi	
2016	Veerappan	"Veer Veer Veerappan (Rap Version)"	Toshi Sabri, Vee	Shaarib-Toshi	Hindi	
2016	Haripada Bandwala	"Eksho Vrindaban"	Nakash Aziz	Indradeep Dasgupta	Bengali	Bengali film
2017	Kaabil	"Haseeno Ka Deewana"	Raftaar	Rajesh Roshan, Gourav-Roshin	Hindi	
2017	Ami Je Ke Tomar	"Take It Easy"	Soumalya Mitra	Indradeep Dasgupta	Bengali	Bengali film
2017	Bhoomi	"Mere Baad"	Solo	Sachet–Parampara	Hindi	
2017	Jio Pagla	"Goribini Maa"	Solo	Jeet Gannguli	Bengali	Bengali film
2017	Tera Intezaar	"Khali Khali Dil"	Armaan Malik	Raaj Aashoo	Hindi	
2018	Welcome to New York	"Nain Phisal Gaye"	Solo	Sajid–Wajid	Hindi	
2018	Baaghi 2	O Saathi	Atif Aslam	Arko Pravo Mukherjee	Hindi	
2018	Veere Di Wedding	"Veere"	Vishal Mishra Aditi Singh Sharma, Dhvani Bhanushali, Nikita Ahuja, Iulia Vantur, Sharvi Yadav	Vishal Mishra	Hindi	
2018	Race 3	"Saansain Hui Dhuan Dhuan"	Gurinder Seagal, Iulia Vantur	Gurinder Seagal	Hindi	
2018	Nawabzaade	"Mummy Kasam"	Gurinder Seagal, Ikka	Gurinder Seagal	Hindi	
2018	Genius	"Dil Meri Na Sune" (Reprise)	Atif Aslam, Stebin Ben	Himesh Reshammiya	Hindi	
2018	Namaste England	"Bhare Bazaar"	Vishal Dadlani, Badshah, B Praak	Badshah, Rishi Rich	Hindi	
2018	Kaashi in Search of Ganga	"Ranjha"	Neeraj Shridhar	DJ Emenes	Hindi	
2018	Jack and Dil	"Dil Mastiyaan"	Ash King	Arghya Banerjee	Hindi	
2018	Jamai Badal	"Jamai Badal Title Song"	Dev Negi	Jeet Gannguli	Bengali	Bengali film
2018	Indore Municipal Corporation	"Hattrick"	Shaan, Rishiking, Jubin Nautiyal	Rishiking	Hindi	
2019	Student of the Year 2	"The Jawaani Song"	Vishal Dadlani, Kishore Kumar	Vishal–Shekhar	Hindi	Lyrics by Anand Bakshi, Anvita Dutt Guptan
2019	Student of the Year 2	"Mumbai Dilli Di Kudiyaan"	Dev Negi, Vishal Dadlani	Vishal–Shekhar	Hindi	Lyrics by Vayu Shrivastav
2019	Student of the Year 2	"Jatt Ludhiyane Da"	Vishal Dadlani	Vishal–Shekhar	Hindi	Lyrics by Anvita Dutt Guptan
2019	Khandaani Shafakhana	"Dil Jaaniye"	Jubin Nautiyal, Tulsi Kumar	Payal Dev	Hindi	Debut as a Composer
2019	Marjaavaan	"Tum Hi Aana"	Jubin Nautiyal	Payal Dev	Hindi	
2019	Marjaavaan	Tum Hi Aana (Happy)	Jubin Nautiyal	Payal Dev	Hindi	
2019	Marjaavaan	Tum Hi Aana (Sad)	Jubin Nautiyal	Payal Dev	Hindi	
2019	Marjaavaan	Tum Hi Aana (Duet)	Jubin Nautiyal, Dhvani Bhanushali	Payal Dev	Hindi	
2019	Daaka	"Phulkari Version 1"	Gippy Grewal	Payal Dev	Punjabi	Punjabi film
2019	Daaka	"Phulkari Version 2"	Gippy Grewal	Payal Dev	Punjabi	Punjabi film
2019	Dabangg 3	"Yu Karke"	Salman Khan	Sajid–Wajid	Hindi	
2020	Happy Hardy and Heer	"Keh Rahi Hain Nazdeekiyan"	Himesh Reshammiya, Ranu Mandal, Sameer Khan	Himesh Reshammiya	Hindi	
2020	Ginny Weds Sunny	"LOL"	Dev Negi	Payal Dev	Hindi	Netflix film
2020	Ginny Weds Sunny	"Sawan Mein Lag Gayi Aag"	Mika Singh, Neha Kakkar, Badshah	Payal Dev	Hindi	Netflix film
2020	Ginny Weds Sunny	"Phir Chala"	Jubin Nautiyal	Payal Dev	Hindi	Netflix film
2020	Unpaused	"Ummeed Hai"	Jubin Nautiyal	Payal Dev	Hindi	Amazon Prime Video anthology film
2020	Chhalaang	"Teri Choriyaan"	Guru Randhawa		Hindi	Netflix film
2020	Suraj Pe Mangal Bhari	"Basanti"	Danish Sabri	Javed-Mohsin	Hindi	
2021	Mumbai Saga	"Danka Baja""	Payal Dev	Dev Negi	Hindi	
2021	Radhe	"Dil De Diya"	Kamaal Khan	Himesh Reshammiya	Hindi	
2021	Shershaah	"Maan Bharryaa 2.0 (Film Version)"	B Praak		Hindi	Only used in the film, not officially released Amazon Prime Video film
2021	Kya Meri Sonam Gupta Bewafa Hai?	"Besharam Aashique"	Rahul Mishra, Romi	Rahul Mishra	Hindi	Zee5 film
2021	Kya Meri Sonam Gupta Bewafa Hai?	"Wallpaper Maiyya Ka"	Divya Kumar	Payal Dev	Hindi	Zee5 film
2021	Satyameva Jayate 2	"Maa Sherawali"	Sachet Tandon	Payal Dev	Hindi	
2022	Nikamma	"Nikamma Title Track"	Dev Negi, Deane Sequeira, Javed-Mohsin	Javed-Mohsin	Hindi	
2022	Middle Class Love	"Tuk Tuk"	Himesh Reshammiya		Hindi	
2022	Cuttputlli	"Lapataa"	Dev Negi	Aditya Dev	Hindi	Disney Plus Hotstar film
2023	Bad Boy	"Alam Na Pucho"	Raj Burman, Akriti Mehra	Himesh Reshammiya	Hindi	
2023	Bloody Daddy	"Issa Vibe"	Badshah	Badshah, Aditya Dev	Hindi	JioCinema film
2023	Kisi Ka Bhai Kisi Ki Jaan	"Yentamma"	Vishal Dadlani, Raftaar	Payal Dev	Hindi	
2023	Satyaprem Ki Katha	"Naseeb Se"	Vishal Mishra	Payal Dev	Hindi	
2024	Main Atal Hoon	"Desh Pehle"	Jubin Nautiyal	Payal Dev	Hindi	
2024	The Buckingham Murders	"Yaad Reh Jaati Hai"	B Praak	Payal Dev	Hindi	
2024	Sikandar Ka Muqaddar	"Thehre Rahen"	Jubin Nautiyal	Payal Dev	Hindi	Netflix film
2025	Baaghi 4	"Akeli Laila"	Payal Dev, Paradox	Payal Dev	Hindi	Along with Aditya Dev
2025	De De Pyaar De 2	"Raat Bhar"	Aditya Rikhari, Payal Dev	Payal Dev	Hindi	Along with Aditya Dev
2025	De De Pyaar De 2	"Baabul Ve"	Shreya Ghoshal	Payal Dev	Hindi	Along with Aditya Dev
2025	Mastiii 4	"Rasiya Balama"	Darshan Rathod, Payal Dev	Sanjeev-Darshan	Hindi	
2026	Tera Yaar Hoon Main	"Tera Yaar Hoon Main-Title Track"	Sachet Tandon, Payal Dev	Payal Dev	Hindi	Along with Aditya Dev
2026	Tera Yaar Hoon Main	"Tum Hi Se Pyaar"	Jubin Nautiyal	Payal Dev	Hindi	Along with Aditya Dev

=== Non-film songs ===
Year	Album	Song	Singer(s)/Co-singer(s)	Composer(s)	Languages	Notes
2016	–	"Naina More"	Solo	Rishiking	Hindi	
2019	–	"Whatsap Love"			Marathi	
2019	–	"Kamariya Hil Rahi Hai"	Pawan Singh	Payal Dev	Bhojpuri	As Composer
2020	–	"Genda Phool"	Badshah	Badshah	Hindi, Bengali	
2020	–	"Toxic"	Badshah	Payal Dev	Hindi	As composer
2020	–	"Jassi"	Ikka	Raaj Aashoo	Punjabi	
2020	–	"Saara India"	Solo	Javed-Mohsin	Hindi	
2020	–	"Baarish"	Stebin Ben	Payal Dev	Hindi	As composer
2021	–	"Baarish Ban Jaana"	Stebin Ben (Hindi); Pawan Singh (Bhojpuri)	Payal Dev	Hindi, Bhojpuri	As composer
2021	–	"Bepanah"	Yasser Desai	Payal Dev	Hindi	As composer
2022	–	"Meri Tarah"	Jubin Nautiyal	Payal Dev	Hindi	As composer
2022	–	"Tumse Pyaar Karke"	Tulsi Kumar, Jubin Nautiyal	Payal Dev	Hindi	As composer

== Discography as a member of Apni Dhun ==
Dev, in collaboration with her husband – Aditya Dev, started an independent music platform named Apni Dhun in 2020. Payal and Aditya, along with Bollywood lyricist Kunaal Vermaa, have collaborated with several artists such as Altaf Raja, B Praak etc.

Year	Songs	Singers	Composers	Lyricist	Notes
2020	Ae Sanamm	Altaf Raja	Payal Dev	Kunaal Vermaa	
2020	Shri Ganesh Mahamantra	Payal Dev	Payal Dev	Traditional Lyrics	
2020	Kyon	B Praak, Payal Dev	Payal Dev	Kunaal Vermaa	
2020	Shri Hanuman Chalisa	Shatrughan Sinha, Pawan Singh	Payal Dev-Aditya Dev	Traditional Lyrics	
2020	Mamma I Love You	Jazz	Payal Dev	Kunaal Vermaa	
2020	Sayyam Rakh	Payal Dev	Payal Dev	Kunaal Vermaa	
2021	Current	Pawan Singh, Payal Dev and Rap by Mohsin Shaikh	Payal Dev	Mohsin Shaikh and Payal Dev	
2022	Mehfooz Hai	Ankit Tiwari	Payal Dev	Sandeep Deswal	
2022	Pyaar Hai	Altamash Faridi	Payal Dev	Rashmi Virag	
2022	Tauba	Badshah, Payal Dev	Payal Dev	Payal Dev	
2023	Intezaar Karne Do	Amarjeet Jaikar	Payal Dev	Kunaal Vermaa	
2023	Baarishon	Udit Narayan, Payal Dev	Payal Dev	Rashmi Virag	
