= Jamai Badal =

2019 Bengali film by Ravi Kinagi

- Official poster
- জামাই বদল
- Directed by: Ravi Kinagi
- Produced by: Surinder Films; Nispal Singh
- Starring: Soham Chakraborty; Koushani Mukherjee; Payel Sarkar; Hiran Chatterjee; Shantilal Mukherjee; Bharat Kaul
- Music by: Jeet Gannguli
- Production company: Surinder Films
- Release date: 18 January 2019 (Kolkata)
- Country: India
- Language: Bengali
- Box office: ₹20 million (equivalent to ₹25 million or US$260,000 in 2023)

Jamai Badal is a Bengali comedy drama film directed by Ravi Kinagi. It was released on 18 January 2019 under the banner of Surinder Films. It is a remake of the Punjabi movie Carry On Jatta which itself was loosely based on the 1989 movie Chakkikotha Chankaran.

== Plot ==
This is the love story of Krish, son of the advocate Gourisankar Chakladar. Gourisankar has two sons, Harisankar and Krish. Harisankar is an advocate like his father but the younger son Krish is very casual in life and does not like working even though his father has given him a factory to handle. He wastes time with his friend Gunjan for fun. Gunjan has a girlfriend, Preeti. Krish and Gunjan travel together to the seaside and there Krish meets Barsha and they fall in love. But Barsha has a condition that she will marry an orphan only which creates all the confusion and begins a chain of lies and laughs.

== Cast ==
- Soham Chakraborty as Krish
- Koushani Mukherjee as Barsha
- Payel Sarkar as Preety
- Hiran Chatterjee as Gunjan
- Shantilal Mukherjee as Pronam Pal
- Bharat Kaul as Bholanath

== Soundtrack ==
Jamai Badal

Soundtrack album by Jeet Gannguli
- Released: 2019
- Recorded: 2018
- Studio: Surinder Films
- Genre: Feature film soundtrack
- Label: Surinder Films

Jeet Gannguli chronology
Bagh Bandi Khela (2018)	Jamai Badal (2019)	Jamai Badal (2019)

Singles from Jamai Badal
- 1. "Mon" Released: 14 December 2018; 2. "Toke Chara" Released: 21 December 2018; 3. "Jamai Badal Title Song" Released: 28 December 2018

All music is composed by Jeet Gannguli.

No.	Title	Lyrics	Singer	Length
1.	"Mon"	Ritam Sen	Jubin Nautiyal; Neha Karode	3:23
2.	"Toke Chara"	Ritam Sen	Jubin Nautiyal	3:23
3.	"Jamai Badal Title Song"	Priyo Chattopadhyay	Dev Negi; Payal Dev	2:51
