= Vishal Mishra (composer) =

Indian singer and music composer

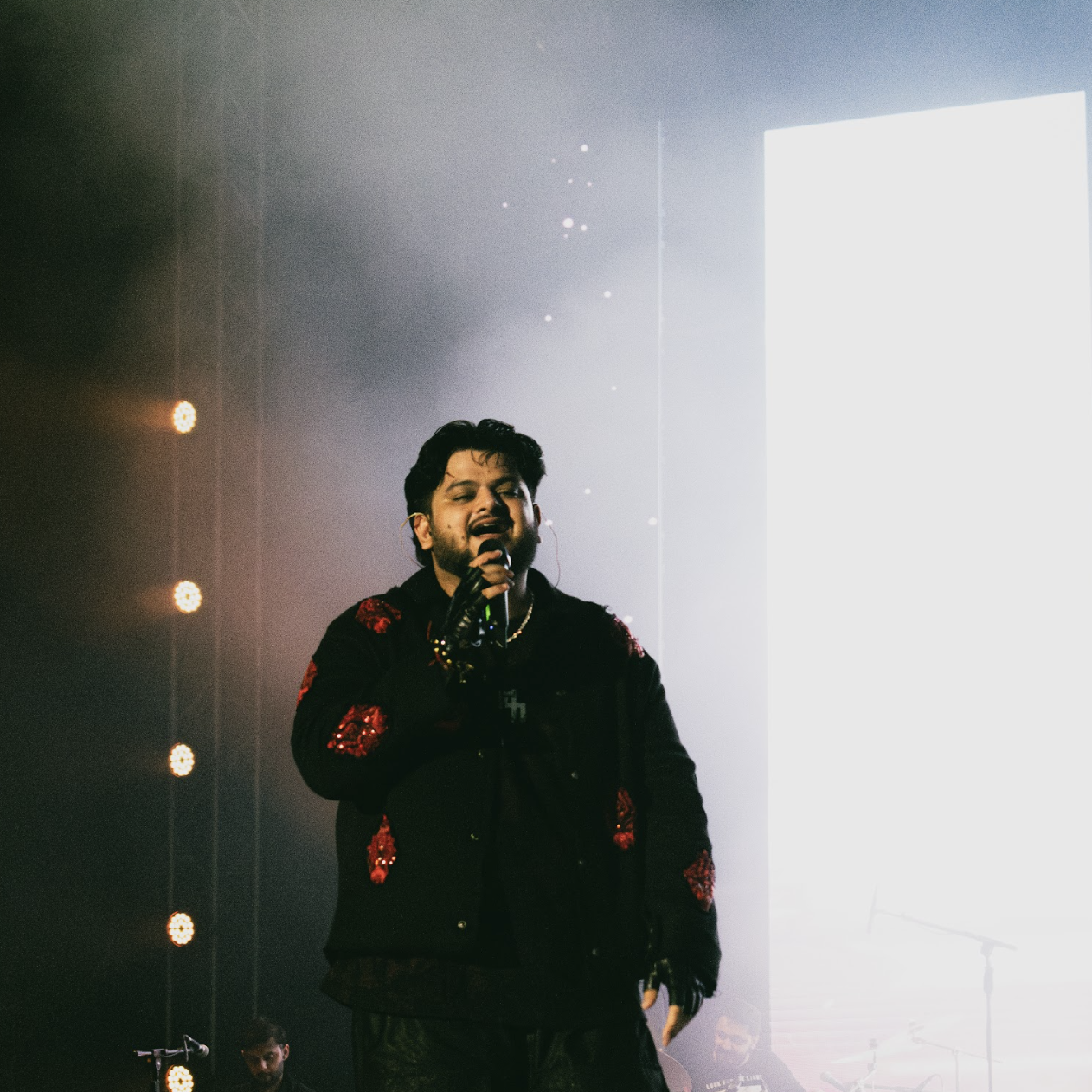
- Vishal in 2024

Background information
- Born: 8 December; Unnao, Uttar Pradesh, India
- Genres: Filmi; Bollywood
- Occupations: Singer; Songwriter
- Instruments: Vocals; Electric guitar; Acoustic guitar; Harmonium; Tabla; Piano; Keyboard
- Years active: 2015-present
- Labels: T-Series; Saregama; Zee; VYRL Originals

Vishal Mishra is an Indian playback singer and music composer known for his work in Indian films.

== Early life ==
Mishra was born in Unnao, Uttar Pradesh. He took his education in Lucknow.

== Career ==
Mishra first appeared in a reality show named Bharat ki Shaan season 3 aired on DD National. He auditioned for the competition Indian Idol but was disqualified. In his initial days of the music industry, Mishra was guided by Lalit Pandit, of the Jatin–Lalit composer duo.

Mishra made his debut as a composer in 2016 with the Tamil film Devi. In 2017, he composed the song "Jaane De", sung by Atif Aslam, featured on the soundtrack of Qarib Qarib Singlle. Mishra also composed songs for Munna Michael, which marked his singing debut, and the Marathi film FU: Friendship Unlimited. He composed the "Rafta Rafta" melody for Yamla Pagla Deewana Phir Se, marking his first project of 2018.

His music video features Salman Khan in a special appearance; Mishra subsequently composed the romantic song "Selfish", written by and starring Khan for the action film Race 3, while also composing the title track of Veere Di Wedding, starring Kareena Kapoor Khan, Sonam Kapoor, Swara Bhasker and Shikha Talsania.

Mishra's first act as a solo composer for songs and score, came with the Salman Khan-produced romantic drama Notebook. He rose to fame with the hit song "Kaise Hua" from Kabir Singh. He then produced a soundtrack for the Anurag Kashyap-produced Saand Ki Aankh, a biopic on the lives of the Shooter Dadis.

In 2020 Mishra released "Manjha", a song featuring Aayush Sharma and Saiee Manjrekar. He was also involved in the composition of the song "Phir Muskurayega India", which featured Bollywood actors Akshay Kumar and Jackky Bhagnani.

== Film songs ==
Key
†	Denotes films that have not yet been released

Year	Film	Song	Singer(s)	Lyricist(s)	Composer(s)
2014	Hum Hai Teen Khurafaati	"Khurafaati"	Vishal Mishra, Yashita Yashpal, Jayshankar, Amitabh Narayn	Shweta Raaj	Kashi-Richard
2014	Hum Hai Teen Khurafaati	"Ruh Se Ruh Ka Milan"	Vishal Mishra, Yashita Yashpal	Shweta Raaj	Kashi-Richard
2015	Charlie Kay Chakkar Mein	"Charlie Kay Chakkar Mein"	Neha Kakkar, Abhijeet Sawant	Sandeep Nath	Vishal Mishra
2016	Shorgul	"Shaam O Seher"	Vishal Mishra	Sameer	Lalit Pandit
2016	Tutak Tutak Tutiya	"Chalte Chalte"	Arijit Singh	Manoj Yadav	Vishal Mishra
2016	Tutak Tutak Tutiya	"Ranga Re"	Shreya Ghoshal	Pranav Vatsa	Vishal Mishra
2017	FU: Friendship Unlimited	"Pehli Dafa"	Vishal Mishra	Sanjeev Chaturvedi	Vishal Mishra
2017	FU: Friendship Unlimited	"Don't Control Us"	Siddharth Basrur	Pranav Vatsa	Vishal Mishra
2017	FU: Friendship Unlimited	"Teri Baaton Ke" (Male Version)	Vishal Mishra	Vishal Mishra, Pranav Vatsa	Vishal Mishra
2017	FU: Friendship Unlimited	"Teri Baaton Ke" (Female Version)	Iulia Vântur	Vishal Mishra, Pranav Vatsa	Vishal Mishra
2017	FU: Friendship Unlimited	"Darmiyaan"	Vishal Mishra, Shreya Ghoshal	Sanjeev Chaturvedi	Vishal Mishra
2017	FU: Friendship Unlimited	"Uff Tera Ye Jalwa" (Version 1)	Sukhwinder Singh, Neeti Mohan	Sameer, Vishal Mishra	Vishal Mishra
2017	FU: Friendship Unlimited	"Uff Tera Ye Jalwa" (Version 2)	Aishwarya Nigam, Neeti Mohan	Sameer, Vishal Mishra	Vishal Mishra
2017	FU: Friendship Unlimited	"Affu Khuda"	Sonu Nigam, Jonita Gandhi, Parry G	Raj Shekhar, Anand Bakshi	Vishal Mishra
2017	FU: Friendship Unlimited	"Tere Bin O Yaara"	Sonu Nigam	Raj Shekhar	Vishal Mishra
2017	FU: Friendship Unlimited	"Darmiyaan" (Acoustic Version)	Akash Ojha, Prakriti Kakar	Sanjeev Chaturvedi	Vishal Mishra
2017	FU: Friendship Unlimited	"F.U." (Title Track)	Vishal Mishra, Wrisha Dutta	Sachin Pathak	Samir Saptiskar
2017	FU: Friendship Unlimited	"Diljale"	Vishal Mishra	Sachin Pathak	Samir Saptiskar
2017	FU: Friendship Unlimited	"Girlfriend"	Vishal Mishra	Sachin Pathak	Samir Saptiskar
2017	Munna Michael	"Pyar Ho"	Vishal Mishra, Sunidhi Chauhan	Kumaar	Vishal Mishra
2017	Munna Michael	"Pyar Ho (Redux)"	Sunidhi Chauhan	Kumaar	Vishal Mishra
2017	The Dream Job	"Dhuaan Dhuaan Hai Zindagi"	Vishal Mishra	Mukesh Mishra	Vishal Mishra
2017	The Dream Job	"Apni Jeb"	Manoj Tiwari	Mukesh Mishra	Vishal Mishra
2017	The Dream Job	"Yaariyan Ye Teri Yaariyan"	Vishal Mishra, Sadhvi Bhatt	Mukesh Mishra	Aditya Virmani, Ronak Runwal
2017	Qarib Qarib Singlle	"Khatam Kahani"	Vishal Mishra, Nooran Sisters	Raj Shekhar	Vishal Mishra
2017	Qarib Qarib Singlle	"Jaane De"	Atif Aslam	Raj Shekhar	Vishal Mishra
2018	Veere Di Wedding	"Veere"	Vishal Mishra, Aditi Singh Sharma, Dhvani Bhanushali, Nikita Ahuja, Payal Dev, Iulia Vântur, Sharvi Yadav	Anvita Dutt Guptan	Vishal Mishra
2018	Veere Di Wedding	"Dagmag Dagmag"	Vishal Mishra, Payal Dev	Anvita Dutt Guptan	Vishal Mishra
2018	Race 3	"Selfish"	Atif Aslam, Iulia Vântur	Salman Khan	Vishal Mishra
2018	Race 3	"I Found Love"	Salman Khan, Veera Saxena	Salman Khan	Vishal Mishra
2018	Race 3	''Selfish" (Solo Version)	Atif Aslam	Salman Khan	Vishal Mishra
2018	Race 3	''Selfish (Solo Version 2)	Stebin Ben	Salman Khan	Vishal Mishra
2018	Race 3	"Selfish" (Unplugged Version)	Vishal Mishra, Atif Aslam	Salman Khan	Vishal Mishra
2018	Yamla Pagla Deewana: Phir Se	"Rafta Rafta Medley"	Vishal Mishra, Jordi Patel, Disha Sharma, Akash Ojha, Rekha, Dharmendra	Kunwar Juneja	Vishal Mishra
2018	5 Weddings	"Na Chah Ke Bhi"	Vishal Mishra, Shirley Setia	Abhendra Kumar Upadhyay	Vishal Mishra
2019	Mard Ko Dard Nahi Hota	''Tere Liye''	Vishal Mishra, Kamakshi Rai	Shantanu Ghatak	Karan Kulkarni
2019	Notebook	"Safar"	Mohit Chauhan	Kaushal Kishore	Vishal Mishra
2019	Notebook	"Bumro"	Vishal Mishra, Kamaal Khan	Kaushal Kishore, Vibha Saraf, Traditional	Vishal Mishra
2019	Notebook	"Nai Lagda"	Vishal Mishra, Asees Kaur	Akshay Tripathi	Vishal Mishra
2019	Notebook	"Laila"	Dhvani Bhanushali	Abhendra Kumar Upadhyay	Vishal Mishra
2019	Notebook	"Main Taare"	Salman Khan	Manoj Muntashir	Vishal Mishra
2019	Notebook	"Main Taare" (Atif Aslam Version) (Note: Not officially released)	Atif Aslam	Manoj Muntashir	Vishal Mishra
2019	Notebook	"The Notebook Symphony"	Instrumental		Vishal Mishra
2019	Kabir Singh	"Kaise Hua"	Vishal Mishra	Manoj Muntashir	Vishal Mishra
2019	Kabir Singh	"Pehla Pyaar (Film Version)"	Vishal Mishra	Irshad Kamil	Vishal Mishra
2019	Kabir Singh	"Pehla Pyaar"	Armaan Malik	Irshad Kamil	Vishal Mishra
2019	Jabariya Jodi	''Ki Honda Pyaar" (Arijit Singh Version)	Arijit Singh	Raj Shekhar	Vishal Mishra
2019	Jabariya Jodi	"Macchardani"	Vishal Mishra, Jyotica Tangri	Raj Shekhar	Vishal Mishra
2019	Jabariya Jodi	"Ki Honda Pyaar" (Neha Kakkar Version)	Neha Kakkar	Raj Shekhar	Vishal Mishra
2019	Pranaam	''Sirf Tu''	Armaan Malik	Manoj Muntashir	Vishal Mishra
2019	Pranaam	"Jai Hanuman"	Sukhwinder Singh	Manoj Muntashir	Vishal Mishra
2019	Pranaam	"Ilaahi"	Sonu Nigam	Manoj Muntashir	Vishal Mishra
2019	Pranaam	"Zindagi"	Ankit Tiwari	Manoj Muntashir	Vishal Mishra
2019	Saand Ki Aankh	''Udta Teetar''	Sunidhi Chauhan, Jyoti Nooran	Raj Shekhar	Vishal Mishra
2019	Saand Ki Aankh	''Womaniya''	Vishal Dadlani	Raj Shekhar	Vishal Mishra
2019	Saand Ki Aankh	''Aasmaa''	Asha Bhosle	Raj Shekhar	Vishal Mishra
2019	Saand Ki Aankh	''Baby Gold''	Sona Mohapatra, Jyotica Tangri	Raj Shekhar	Vishal Mishra
2019	Saand Ki Aankh	''Jhunna Jhunna''	Krutika Borkar, Pratibha Singh Baghel	Raj Shekhar	Vishal Mishra
2019	Saand Ki Aankh	''Womaniya" (Raw Version)	Vishal Mishra	Raj Shekhar	Vishal Mishra
2019	Saand Ki Aankh	''Aasmaa" (Studio Version)	Vishal Mishra	Raj Shekhar	Vishal Mishra
2019	Broken But Beautiful:S2 (Web Series)	"Teri Hogaiyaan"	Vishal Mishra	Vishal Mishra	Vishal Mishra
2019	Broken But Beautiful:S2 (Web Series)	"Teri Hogaiyaan" (Female Version)	Shyamoli Sanghi	Vishal Mishra	Vishal Mishra
2020	Bamfaad	Bamfaad (Title Track)	Vishal Mishra	Raj Shekhar	Vishal Mishra
2020	Bamfaad	Ishq Ka Itar	Vishal Mishra	Raj Shekhar	Vishal Mishra
2020	Bamfaad	"Munasib"	Vishal Mishra, Anandi Joshi	Raj Shekhar	Vishal Mishra
2020	Bamfaad	"Yaar Mera Ho Mere Rubabu"	Sukhwinder Singh, Vishal Mishra, Hemant Brijwasi, Moin Sabri	Raj Shekhar	Vishal Mishra
2020	Khuda Haafiz	"Jaan Ban Gaye"	Vishal Mishra, Asees Kaur	Mithoon	
2020	Shakeela	"Woh Lamha"	Vishal Mishra	Kumaar	Veer Samarth
2021	Time to Dance	"Aaye Haaye"	Milind Gaba, Aditi Singh Sharma	Kumaar	Vishal Mishra
2021	Time to Dance	"Time To Dance"	Vishal Mishra, Neeti Mohan	Kumaar	Vishal Mishra
2021	Yuva D	''Desh Ka Yodha''	Vishal Mishra	Kumaar	S. Thaman
2021	Broken But Beautiful:S3 (Web Series)	"Teri Hogaiyaan 2"	Vishal Mishra	Vishal Mishra, Kaushal Kishore	Vishal Mishra
2022	Ranjish Hi Sahi (Web Series)	"Tham Sa Gaya"	Vishal Mishra	Ravi	Aabhas-Shreyas
2022	RRR D	"Naacho Naacho"	Vishal Mishra, Rahul Sipligunj	Riya Mukherjee	M. M. Keeravani
2022	RRR D	"Sholay"	Vishal Mishra, Benny Dayal, Sahithi Chaganti, Harika Narayan	Riya Mukherjee	M. M. Keeravani
2022	Attack: Part 1	"Main Nai Tuttna"	Vishal Mishra	Kumaar	Shashwat Sachdev
2022	Operation Romeo	"Yeh Kyun Kiya"	Vishal Mishra	Manoj Muntashir	M. M. Keeravani
2022	Operation Romeo	"Tere Bin Jeena Kya"	Vishal Mishra, Rupali Jagga	Manoj Muntashir	M. M. Keeravani
2022	Never Kiss Your Best Friend: S2 (Web Series)	"Dil Ko Tujhpe Pyaar"	Vishal Mishra	Vishal Mishra, Kaushal Kishore	Vishal Mishra
2022	Never Kiss Your Best Friend: S2 (Web Series)	"Phir Se"	Vishal Mishra	Vishal Mishra, Kaushal Kishore	Vishal Mishra
2022	Never Kiss Your Best Friend: S2 (Web Series)	"Jee Na Paunga"	Vishal Mishra	Vishal Mishra, Jay Tanna "SIFAR	Vishal Mishra
2022	Ittu Si Baat	"Gulabi"	Vishal Mishra, Shreya Ghoshal	Raj Shekhar	Vishal Mishra
2022	Ittu Si Baat	"Sun Bhi Le"	Arijit Singh	Raj Shekhar	Vishal Mishra
2022	Ittu Si Baat	"17 Lakh Da Gajra"	Tony Kakkar, Asees Kaur	Raj Shekhar	Vishal Mishra
2022	Ittu Si Baat	"Darbadar"	Jubin Nautiyal	Raj Shekhar	Vishal Mishra
2022	Ittu Si Baat	"Middle Class"	Nakash Aziz	Raj Shekhar	Vishal Mishra
2022	Khuda Haafiz: Chapter 2 - Agni Pariksha	"Rubaru"	Vishal Mishra, Asees Kaur	Manoj Muntashir	Vishal Mishra
2022	Khuda Haafiz: Chapter 2 - Agni Pariksha	"Aaja Ve"	Vishal Mishra	Vishal Mishra, Kaushal Kishore, Faruk Kabir	Vishal Mishra
2022	Ponniyin Selvan-1 D	"Chola Chola"	Vishal Mishra, Swagat Rathod	Mehboob	A. R. Rahman
2022	Nazar Andaaz	"Lootere Aa Gaye"	Sachet Tandon, Mohammed Danish	Raj Shekhar	Vishal Mishra
2022	Nazar Andaaz	"Andekhe Rang"	Vishal Mishra	Raj Shekhar	Vishal Mishra
2022	Nazar Andaaz	"Aadhi Kahaani"	Jubin Nautiyal	Raj Shekhar	Vishal Mishra
2022	Nazar Andaaz	"Jadoo"	Parampara Tandon	Raj Shekhar	Vishal Mishra
2022	Nazar Andaaz	"Sukoon"	Armaan Malik	Raj Shekhar	Vishal Mishra
2022	Nazar Andaaz	"Sukoon" (Female Version)	Tulsi Kumar	Raj Shekhar	Vishal Mishra
2022	Mili	"Sun Aye Mili"	Vishal Mishra	Javed Akhtar	A. R. Rahman
2022	Mili	"Jeena Hoga"	Vishal Mishra	Javed Akhtar	A. R. Rahman
2022	Maarrich	"Na Boond"	Vishal Mishra	Kaushal Kishore	Vishal Mishra
2022	Maarrich	"Deewana"	Vishal Mishra	Vishal Mishra	Vishal Mishra
2022	Bharateeyans	"Main Aa Raha Re"	Vishal Mishra	Vipin Das	Satya Kashyap
2023	Chor Nikal Ke Bhaga	"Janiye"	Vishal Mishra, Rashmeet Kaur	Vishal Mishra	
2023	Chor Nikal Ke Bhaga	"Janiye" (Female Version)	Noor Chahal	Vishal Mishra	
2023	Gumraah	"Soniye Je"	Vishal Mishra	Vishal Mishra	
2023	8 A.M. Metro	"Phir Se Dil Toota"	Vishal Mishra	Kausar Munir	Mark K Robin
2023	Satyaprem Ki Katha	"Naseeb Se"	Vishal Mishra, Payal Dev	A. M. Turaz	Payal Dev
2023	Bawaal	"Dilon Ki Doriyan"	Vishal Mishra, Zahrah S Khan, Romy	Arafat Mehmood	Tanishk Bagchi
2023	Jailer	"Rathamaarey"	Vishal Mishra	Vignesh Shivan	Anirudh Ravichander
2023	Gadar 2	"Chal Tere Ishq Mein"	Vishal Mishra, Neeti Mohan, Sahil Akhtar, Shehnaz Akhtar	Sayeed Quadri	Mithoon
2023	Gadar 2	"Chal Tere Ishq Mein" (Vishal Mishra)	Vishal Mishra	Sayeed Quadri	Mithoon
2023	Gadar 2	"Dil Jhoom" (Vishal Mishra)	Vishal Mishra	Sayeed Quadri	Mithoon
2023	Mission Raniganj: The Great Bharat Rescue	"Keemti"	Vishal Mishra	Kaushal Kishore	Vishal Mishra
2023	Thank You for Coming	"Duniya Farzi"	Nikhita Gandhi, Hansika Pareek	Kumaar	Vishal Mishra
2023	Yaariyan 2	"Saure Ghar"	Vishal Mishra, Neeti Mohan	Manan Bhardwaj	
2023	Ganapath	"Jai Ganesha"	Vishal Mishra	Akshay Tripathi	Vishal Mishra
2023	Kushi (D)	"Sabr-E-Dil Toota"	Vishal Mishra, Gayatri Asokan	Raqueeb Alam	Hesham Abdul Wahab
2023	Pippa	"Mohabbatein Shukriya"	Vishal Mishra, Suzanne D'Mello	Shellee	A. R. Rahman
2023	Apurva	"Diwali"	Vishal Mishra	Kaushal Kishore	Vishal Mishra
2023	Apurva	"Hai Khuda"	Vishal Mishra	Kaushal Kishore	Vishal Mishra
2023	Apurva	"Tujhse Pyaar Hai"	Vishal Mishra	Vishal Mishra	Vishal Mishra
2023	Animal	"Pehle Bhi Main"	Vishal Mishra	Raj Shekhar	Vishal Mishra
2023	Animal	"Marham" (Pehle Bhi Main)	Vishal Mishra	Raj Shekhar	Vishal Mishra
2023	Mast Mein Rehne Ka	"Ek Taara"	Vishal Mishra, Madhubanti Bagchi	Vijay Maurya	Anurag Saikia
2023	Dunki	"Main Tera Rasta Dekhunga"	Vishal Mishra, Shreya Ghoshal, Shadab Faridi, Altamash Faridi	Amitabh Bhattacharya	Pritam
2024	Indian Police Force: S1 (Web Series)	"Bairiyaa Re"	Vishal Mishra	Siddhesh Patole	Akashdeep Sengupta
2024	Fighter	"Bekaar Dil"	Vishal Mishra, Shilpa Rao, Vishal Dadlani	Kumaar	Vishal-Shekhar
2024	Crakk - Jeetega Toh Jiyegaa	"Dil Jhoom"	Vishal Mishra, Shreya Ghoshal	Gurpreet Saini, Ali Zafar	Tanishk Bagchi, Ali Zafar
2024	Crakk - Jeetega Toh Jiyegaa	"Jeena Haram"	Vishal Mishra, Shilpa Rao	Tanishk Bagchi	
2024	Kaagaz 2	"Tera Mera Rishta"	Vishal Mishra	Rashmi Virag	Shaarib-Toshi
2024	Yodha	"Zindagi Tere Naam"	Vishal Mishra	Kaushal Kishore	Vishal Mishra
2024	Yodha	"Zindagi Tere Naam" (Soul Version)	Vishal Mishra	Kaushal Kishore	Vishal Mishra
2024	Crew	"Kiddan Zaalima"	Vishal Mishra	Raj Shekhar	Vishal Mishra
2024	Bade Miyan Chote Miyan	"Bade Miyan Chote Miyan"	Vishal Mishra, Anirudh Ravichander	Irshad Kamil	Vishal Mishra
2024	Bade Miyan Chote Miyan	"Mast Malang Jhoom"	Vishal Mishra, Arijit Singh, Nikhita Gandhi	Irshad Kamil	Vishal Mishra
2024	Bade Miyan Chote Miyan	"Wallah Habibi"	Vishal Mishra, Vishal Dadlani, Dipakshi Kalita	Irshad Kamil	Vishal Mishra
2024	Bade Miyan Chote Miyan	"Rang Ishq Ka" (Redux)	Neha Bhasin	Irshad Kamil	Vishal Mishra
2024	Bade Miyan Chote Miyan	"Rang Ishq Ka"	Vishal Mishra	Irshad Kamil	Vishal Mishra
2024	Ruslaan	"Taade"	Vishal Mishra	Shabbir Ahmed	Vishal Mishra
2024	Savi	"Humdum"	Vishal Mishra	Raj Shekhar	Vishal Mishra
2024	Mr. & Mrs. Mahi	"Roya Jab Tu"	Vishal Mishra	Vishal Mishra, Azeem Dayani	Vishal Mishra
2024	Blackout	"Chitralekha"	Vishal Mishra	Vishal Mishra	Vishal Mishra
2024	Blackout	"Kya Hua"	Vishal Mishra	Vishal Mishra	Vishal Mishra
2024	Blackout	"Chor"	Vishal Mishra, Suraj Jagan	Vishal Mishra	Vishal Mishra
2024	Lucky Bhaskar D	"Naaraazgi"	Vishal Mishra, Shweta Mohan	Manoj Muntashir	G. V. Prakash
2024	Bad Newz	"Jaanam"	Vishal Mishra	Vishal Mishra	
2024	Khel Khel Mein	"Duur Na Karin"	Vishal Mishra, Zahrah S Khan & Nabeel Shaukat Ali	Kumaar	Tanishk Bagchi
2024	Khel Khel Mein	"Chal Ve Dilla"	Vishal Mishra, Rochak Kohli	Kumaar	Rochak Kohli
2024	Stree 2	"Khoobsurat"	Vishal Mishra	Amitabh Bhattacharya	Sachin-Jigar
2024	Yudhra	"Saathiya"	Vishal Mishra, Pratibha Singh Baghel	Javed Akhtar	Shankar-Ehsaan-Loy
2024	Binny and Family	"Zindagi"	Vishal Mishra	Kaushal Kishore	Vishal Mishra
2024	Vicky Vidya Ka Woh Wala Video	"Tum Jo Mile Ho"	Vishal Mishra	Priya Saraiya	Sachin-Jigar
2024	Vicky Vidya Ka Woh Wala Video	"Mushkil Hai"	Vishal Mishra, Hansika Pareek	Som	Sachin-Jigar
2024	Vanvaas	"Bandhan"	Vishal Mishra, Palak Muchhal	Sayeed Quadri	Mithoon
2024	Shontaan	"Tomar Akashey"	Vishal Mishra	Anindo Chatterjee	Jeet Gannguli
2024	Baby John	"Pikley Pom"	Vishal Mishra, Riya Seepana	Irshad Kamil	Thaman S
2025	Fateh	"Heer"	Vishal Mishra, Asees Kaur	Shabbir Ahmed	Ajay Pal Sharma, Shabbir Ahmed
2025	Sky Force	"Kya Meri Yaad Aati Hai"	Vishal Mishra	Irshad Kamil	Tanishk Bagchi
2025	Deva	"Bhasad Macha"	Mika Singh, Vishal Mishra, Jyotica Tangri	Raj Shekhar	Vishal Mishra
2025	Deva	"Bas Tera Pyaar Hai"	Vishal Mishra, Pratiksha Kale	Raj Shekhar	Vishal Mishra
2025	Loveyapa	"Kaun Kinna Zaroori Si"	Vishal Mishra	Dhrruv Yogi	Suyyash Rai & Siddharth Singh
2025	Crazxy	"Pul"	Vishal Mishra	Gulzar	Vishal Bhardwaj
2025	Ek Radha Ek Meera	"Antaricha"	Vishal Mishra, Neeti Mohan	Spruha Joshi	Vishal Mishra
2025	Ek Radha Ek Meera	"Jara Jara Mi Zurate"	Vishal Mishra, Neeti Mohan	Jitendra Joshi	Vishal Mishra
2025	Ek Radha Ek Meera	"Spruha Theme"	Vishal Mishra, Neeti Mohan	Jitendra Joshi	Vishal Mishra
2025	Ek Radha Ek Meera	"Dil Lafanga"	Vishal Mishra, Shalmali Kholgade	Jitendra Joshi	Vishal Mishra
2025	Ek Radha Ek Meera	"Jiya Jayena"	Sukhwinder Singh	Jitendra Joshi	Vishal Mishra
2025	Ek Radha Ek Meera	"Kasa Sangu"	Aanandi Joshi	Jitendra Joshi	Vishal Mishra
2025	Ek Radha Ek Meera	"Dil Lafanga 2"	Vishal Mishra, Lulia Vantur	Jitendra Joshi	Vishal Mishra
2025	Mere Husband Ki Biwi	"Rabba Mereya"	Vishal Mishra	Mudassar Aziz	Vishal Mishra
2025	Sikandar	"Taikhaane Mein"	Vishal Mishra	SOM	Pritam
2025	Jewel Thief	"Ilzaam"	Vishal Mishra, Shilpa Rao	Kumaar	Soundtrek & Anis Ali Sabri
2025	Ground Zero	"Pehli Dafa"	Vishal Mishra	Irshad Kamil	Rohan-Rohan
2025	Metro... In Dino	"Mann Ye Mera"	Vishal Mishra	Neelesh Misra	Pritam
2025	Metro... In Dino	"Dil Ka Kya (Encore)"	Vishal Mishra	Anurag Sharma	Pritam
2025	Aankhon Ki Gustaakhiyan	"Nazara"	Vishal Mishra	Vishal Mishra	Vishal Mishra
2025	Aankhon Ki Gustaakhiyan	"Alvida"	Vishal Mishra	Vishal Mishra	Vishal Mishra
2025	Aankhon Ki Gustaakhiyan	"Kya Karun"	Vishal Mishra	Vishal Mishra	Vishal Mishra
2025	Aankhon Ki Gustaakhiyan	"Alvida (Asees Version)"	Asees Kaur	Vishal Mishra	Vishal Mishra
2025	Aankhon Ki Gustaakhiyan	"Yuhi Safar"	Jubin Nautiyal	Vishal Mishra	Vishal Mishra
2025	Aankhon Ki Gustaakhiyan	"Aankhon Ki Gustaakhiyan (Title Track)"	Jubin Nautiyal	Vishal Mishra, Kaushal Kishore	Vishal Mishra
2025	Aap Jaisa Koi	"Mila Tujhe"	Vishal Mishra, Prateeksha Srivastava	Raj Shekhar	Justin Prabhakaran
2025	Saiyaara	"Tum Ho Toh"	Vishal Mishra, Hansika Pareek	Raj Shekhar	Vishal Mishra
2025	Tanvi the Great	"Zindagi"	Vishal Mishra	Kausar Munir	M. M. Keeravani
2025	Sarzameen	"Mere Murshid Mere Yaara"	Vishal Mishra, Salman Ali	Jaani	Vishal Mishra
2025	Son of Sardaar 2	"Pehla Tu Duja Tu"	Vishal Mishra	Jaani	Jaani
2025	Dhadak 2	"Tu Meri Dhadak Hai"	Vishal Mishra	Rashmi Virag	Javed-Mohsin
2025	Param Sundari	"Chand Kagaz Ka"	Vishal Mishra	Amitabh Bhattacharya	Sachin-Jigar
2025	Tu Meri Poori Kahani	"Tu Meri Poori Kahani - Rock"	Vishal Mishra	Shweta Bothra	Anu Malik
2025	Ek Deewane ki Deewaniyat	"Deewaniyat"	Vishal Mishra	Kunaal Vermaa	JAM8
2025	Ek Deewane ki Deewaniyat	"Deewaniyat (Unplugged)"	Vishal Mishra	Kunaal Vermaa	JAM8
2025	Haq	"Qubool"	Armaan Khan	Kaushal Kishore	Vishal Mishra
2025	Haq	"Dil Tod Gaya Tu"	Vishal Mishra	Kaushal Kishore	Vishal Mishra
2025	Haq	"Haq Hai Mera"	Vishal Mishra	Kaushal Kishore	Vishal Mishra
2025	Haq	"Kya Paaya"	Ali Brothers	Kaushal Kishore	Vishal Mishra
2025	Haq	"Jhoom Banware"	Malini Awasthi, Jyotica Tangri, Bidyut Jyoti Mohan	Kaushal Kishore	Vishal Mishra
2025	Haq	"Dil Tod Gaya - Duet Version"	Akash Ojha, Sneha Shankar	Kaushal Kishore	Vishal Mishra
2026	Ikkis	"Sajda"	Vishal Mishra, Asees Kaur	Amitabh Bhattacharya	White Noise Collectives
2026	The RajaSaab	"Sahana Sahana"	Vishal Mishra, Thaman S, Sruthi Ranjani	Krishna Kanth	Thaman S
2026	Border 2	"Ghar Kab Aaoge"	Sonu Nigam, Arijit Singh, Vishal Mishra, Diljit Dosanjh	Javed Akhtar, Manoj Muntashir	Anu Malik, Mithoon
2026	Border 2	"Jaate Hue Lamhon"	Vishal Mishra, Roop Kumar Rathod	Javed Akhtar	Anu Malik, Mithoon
2026	Border 2	"Pyaari Lage"	Vishal Mishra, Tulsi Kumar	Manoj Muntashir	Vishal Mishra
2026	Do Deewane Seher Mein	"Wajah Bewajah"	Vishal Mishra	Kumaar	Shreyas Puranik
2026	The Kerala Story 2	"Saathi Re"	Vishal Mishra	Manoj Muntashir	Mannan Shaah
2026	Bhooth Bangla	"O Sundari"	A R Rahman, Vishal Mishra, Rakshita Suresh, Deepthi Suresh	Kumaar	Pritam
2026	Peddi	"Massa Massa"	Vishal Mishra, Nakash Aziz, Antara Mitra	Anantha Sri Ram	A R Rahman
2026	Jana Nayagan	"Oru Pere Varalaaru"	Vishal Mishra, Anirudh Ravichander	Vivek	Anirudh Ravichander
2026	DC (film)	"Raga of Madness"	Vishal Mishra, Ashwin Krishna		Anirudh Ravichander
2026	Pallichattambi	"Kattuchembakam Poothotte"	Vishal Mishra	Kaithapram Damodaran Namboothiri	Jakes Bejoy
2026	Toxic: A Fairy Tale for Grown-ups	"Tabaahi"	Vishal Mishra	Yogaraj Bhat (Kannada)	Vishal Mishra
2026	Toxic: A Fairy Tale for Grown-ups	"Tabaahi"	Vishal Mishra	Raj Shekhar (Hindi)	Vishal Mishra
2026	Toxic: A Fairy Tale for Grown-ups	"Tabaahi"	Vishal Mishra	Ramajogayya Sastry (Telugu)	Vishal Mishra
2026	Toxic: A Fairy Tale for Grown-ups	"Tabaahi"	Vishal Mishra	Vignesh Shivan (Tamil)	Vishal Mishra
2026	Toxic: A Fairy Tale for Grown-ups	"Tabaahi"	Rafeeq Ahammed (Malayalam)		Vishal Mishra
2026	The Vvaan: Force of the Forrest	"Chhathi Maiya"	Vishal Mishra	Kaushal Kishore	Vishal Mishra
2027	Beparwah	"Beparwah (Title Track)"	Vishal Mishra	Raj Shekhar	Vishal Mishra
2027	TBA	"Tu Meri Zindagi Hai"	Vishal Mishra	Sameer Anjaan	Pritam

== Non-film songs ==
=== Singles ===
Year	Song	Singer(s)	Composer(s)	Lyricist(s)
2019	"Sajna Ve"	Vishal Mishra, Lisa Mishra	Vishal Mishra	Akshay Tripathi, Vishal Mishra
2019	"Takda Rava"	Vishal Mishra	Vishal Mishra	Vishal Mishra
2020	"Manjha"	Vishal Mishra	Vishal Mishra	Vishal Mishra, Akshay Tripathi
2020	"Muskurayega India"	Vishal Mishra	Vishal Mishra	Kaushal Kishore
2020	"Aaj Bhi"	Vishal Mishra	Vishal Mishra	Vishal Mishra, Kaushal Kishore, Yash Anand
2020	"Kithe"	Vishal Mishra	Vishal Mishra	Babbu
2020	"Haq Hai Humara"	Vishal Mishra	Vishal Mishra	Manoj Muntashir
2020	"Humko Tum Mil Gaye"	Vishal Mishra	Naresh Sharma	Sayeed Quadri
2020	"Woh Chaand Kahan Se Laogi"	Vishal Mishra	Vishal Mishra	Manoj Muntashir
2021	"Jannayak"	Vishal Mishra	Yara, Shubham Srivastva	Kaushal Kishore
2021	"Tu Bhi Sataya Jayega"	Vishal Mishra	Vishal Mishra	Vishal Mishra, Kaushal Kishore
2021	"Zyada Vadia"	Nishawn Bhullar	Vishal Mishra	Babbu
2021	"Tumse Pyaar Hai"	Vishal Mishra	Vishal Mishra	Vishal Mishra, Kaushal Kishore
2021	"Vande Mataram"	Tiger Shroff	Vishal Mishra	Kaushal Kishore
2021	"Pyaar Ho Jayega"	Vishal Mishra	Vishal Mishra	Vishal Mishra, Akshay Tripathi
2021	"Chhathi Maiya Bulaye"	Vishal Mishra	Vishal Mishra	Kaushal Kishore
2021	"Chale Bhi Jao"	Vishal Mishra	Vishal Mishra	Kaushal Kishore
2021	"Bollywood Wala Dance"	Mamta Sharma	Vishal Mishra	Danish Iqbal Sabri
2022	"Dildaar"	Manoj Tiwari	Vishal Mishra	Manoj Tiwari
2022	"Kya Kar Diya"	Vishal Mishra	Vishal Mishra	Vishal Mishra, Kaushal Kishore
2022	"Runjhun"	Vishal Mishra, Hansika Pareek	Vishal Mishra	Rashmi Virag
2022	"Bharosa"	Vishal Mishra, Nishawn Bhullar	Vishal Mishra	Kaushal Kishore
2022	"Ram Aaye Hain Ayodhya"	Vishal Mishra	Vishal Mishra	Kaushal Kishore
2022	"Aao Naa"	Vishal Mishra	Vishal Mishra	Kaushal Kishore
2022	"Chandni"	Vishal Mishra	Vishal Mishra	Vishal Mishra, Kaushal Kishore
2023	"Kho Jaane De"	Vishal Mishra	Vishal Mishra	Vishal Mishra
2023	"Zihaal e Miskin"	Vishal Mishra, Shreya Ghoshal	Javed-Mohsin, Laxmikant-Pyarelal	Kunaal Vermaa, Gulzar
2023	"Hanuman Ki Bhujayien"	Vishal Mishra	Payal Dev	Manoj Muntashir
2023	"Vande Bharatam"	Vishal Mishra, Arko	Arko	Manoj Muntashir
2023	"Aakhir"	Vishal Mishra		Kaushal Kishore
2023	"Ram Aayenge"	Vishal Mishra	Payal Dev	Manoj Muntashir
2023	"Door Aa Gaye"	Vishal Mishra, Dino James		
2023	"Ek Mulaqaat"	Vishal Mishra, Shreya Ghoshal	Javed-Mohsin	Rashmi Virag, Sameer
2024	"Pahadon Mein"	Vishal Mishra		Vishal Mishra
2024	"Ram Lala"	Vishal Mishra		Manoj Muntashir
2024	"Meri Zindagi"	Vishal Mishra, Tulsi Kumar	Javed-Mohsin	Rashmi Virag
2024	"Galti"	Vishal Mishra	Vishal Mishra	Kaushal Kishore
2024	"Tere Kol Rehna"	Vishal Mishra	Rochak Kohli	Gurpreet Saini
2024	"Laa Pila De Sharaab"	Vishal Mishra	Manan Bhardwaj	
2024	"Saanwre Shyam"	Vishal Mishra	Payal Dev	Manoj Muntashir
2024	"Saccha Wala Pyaar"	Vishal Mishra, Tulsi Kumar	Tanishk Bagchi	
2024	"Aaj Bhi 2"	Vishal Mishra		Kaushal Kishore
2024	"Children of the Sun"	Vishal Mishra, Alan Walker	Pritam, Alan Walker	IP Singh, Alan Walker
2024	"Maa Ka Mann"	Vishal Mishra		Manoj Muntashir
2024	"Tera Kasoor"	Vishal Mishra	Payal Dev	Kunaal Vermaa
2025	"Holi Aayi Re"	Vishal Mishra, Malini Awasthi, Prateeksha Srivastava	Vishal Mishra	Kaushal Kishore
2025	"Tik Tik"	Vishal Mishra, DYSTINCT, Jacqueline Fernandez	DYSTINCT, Tanishk Bagchi	DYSTINCT, Kumaar
2025	"Tu Saath Hai Toh"	Vishal Mishra	Mithoon	Sayeed Quadri
2025	"Chaandaniya"	Vishal Mishra	Mithoon	Sayeed Quadri
2025	"Oh Mama! TETEMA"	Vishal Mishra, Shreya Ghoshal	Vishal Mishra, Rayvanny, Sanjoy	
2025	"Radha Ke Charan"	Vishal Mishra		Manoj Muntashir

=== Albums ===
Year	Album	Song	Singer(s)	Composer(s)	Lyricist(s)
2026	Pagalpan	"Kya Bataun Tujhe"	Vishal Mishra		

== Accolades ==
Year	Award Ceremony	Category	Nominated work	Result	Notes
2018	10th Mirchi Music Awards	Upcoming Music Composer of The Year	"Pyar Ho" from Munna Michael	Nominated	
2018	10th Mirchi Music Awards	Upcoming Music Composer of The Year	"Jaane De" from Qarib Qarib Singlle	Nominated	
2019	26th Screen Awards	Best Music Album	"Kaise Hua & Pehla Pyar " from Kabir Singh	Won	
2020	65th Filmfare Awards	Best Music Album	Kabir Singh	Won	Zee Cine Awards For Best Music Director (Kabir Singh); Mirchi Music Award For Best Music Director (Kabir Singh)
2024	69th Filmfare Awards	Best Music Album	Animal	Won	
