= Munna Michael =

2017 Indian film by Sabbir Khan

- Theatrical release poster
- Directed by: Sabbir Khan
- Written by: Vimmi Datta
- Produced by: Viki Rajani
- Starring: Tiger Shroff; Nawazuddin Siddiqui; Nidhhi Agerwal; Ronit Roy
- Cinematography: Hari K. Vedantam
- Edited by: Manan Ajay Sagar
- Music by: Songs: Meet Bros; Tanishk Bagchi; Pranaay Rijia; Vishal Mishra; Javed - Mohsin; Gourov-Roshin; Score: Sandeep Shirodkar
- Production companies: Eros International; Next Gen Films
- Distributed by: Eros International; Next Gen Films
- Release date: 21 July 2017
- Running time: 139 minutes
- Country: India
- Language: Hindi
- Budget: ₹41 crore
- Box office: ₹47.20 crore

Munna Michael is a 2017 Indian Hindi-language action dance film directed by Sabbir Khan, written by Vimmi Datta, and produced by Viki Rajani and Eros International. The film features Tiger Shroff in the titular role, alongside Nawazuddin Siddiqui, Niddhi Agerwal, Ronit Roy, and Pankaj Tripathi in supporting roles. It marks the third collaboration of Shroff and Khan after Heropanti and Baaghi.

Munna Michael was released on 21 July 2017 to mixed-to-negative reviews from critics.

== Plot ==
Manasva "Michael" Roy is a dancer inspired by Michael Jackson. One day, he is fired from his job at the studio. On his way home, he finds a newborn baby on the roadside and adopts him, naming the child Manav "Munna" Roy. Munna also grows up to be an extraordinary dancer and a diehard fan of Michael Jackson. However, Michael instead insists Munna find a proper job. Munna secretly visits dance clubs with his friends and challenges their dancers to win money. Michael falls ill and is admitted to the hospital. When Munna goes to see him, he once again asks his son to give up dancing. Meanwhile, the dance clubs in Mumbai have blacklisted Munna and his friends, so he decides to try his luck in Delhi.

At a club in Delhi, Munna clashes with Balli and beats his friends. Balli is the brother of gangster Mahender Fauji. When Mahender learns about his brother's fight, he asks a police inspector to capture Munna. Mahender watches CCTV footage of Munna dancing in the waiting room just before the fight Munna with Balli. Impressed, he asks Munna to teach him how to dance. During their lessons, Munna and Mahender become close friends. One day, some gangsters attack Mahender, and Munna saves his life. Mahender then brings Munna to Delhi and declares him to be like his brother. Mahender tells Munna that he wants to become a good dancer to impress his crush, Deepika "Dolly" Sharma, who is a dancer in a club.

Mahender gives Dolly a gift through Munna under the guise of a courier boy. Dolly and Munna become good friends after a few more meetings. Dolly confides in him that she dreams of becoming a renowned dancer and wants to win the upcoming Dancing Star contest in Mumbai. Munna gives Dolly an appointment letter for the lead dancer role at the Blue Star Hotel in Meerut, which is owned by Mahender, and she accepts. Mahender meets Dolly and gifts her a car and flat as a friendly gesture. Dolly finds Balli hiding in the flat, who spitefully lies that Mahender would only keep her as a sex slave. She flees. When Mahender learns what happened, he attempts to kill Balli is enraged, but his friend and Munna stop him. During this incident, Munna discovers that Mahender is married, but it was against his will. After losing Dolly, Mahender becomes depressed. Munna promises to get her back.

Munna returns to Mumbai and coincidentally finds Dolly, who is there to participate in Dancing Star. Dolly tells Munna that she wants to win the show so that she will be able to face her father, as she ran away from home to pursue her dancing career. Munna changes his mind and decides to help her. Munna asks his friends to help Dolly by becoming part of his dance group. Munna had lied to Dolly that he cannot dance until she finds him dancing and training her dance group one day. After Munna tells her the truth, Dolly asks him to be her partner at the competition.

Meanwhile, Mahender comes to Mumbai in search of Dolly. Due to Munna's betrayal, he kidnaps Michael and gives Munna 24 hours to bring Dolly to him or his father will be killed. Dolly and Munna go to Delhi, where enrages Dolly tells Mahender that she loves Munna. Munna, Michael, and Dolly leave for Mumbai. There, a furious Balli tries to beats them up, but Munna defeats him and his goons. During the fight, Balli shoots Munna in the leg. Munna still goes onstage and performs with Dolly, and they win. Michael finally accepts his son's passion, while Mahender soon comes to accept Munna and Dolly's love and makes amends with Munna.

== Cast ==
- Tiger Shroff as Manav Roy aka Munna Michael
  - Siddharth Nigam as Young Manav
- Nawazuddin Siddiqui as Mahender Fauji
- Nidhhi Agerwal as Deepika "Dolly" Sharma
- Ronit Roy as Manasva "Michael" Roy, Munna's father and caretaker
- Pankaj Tripathi as Balli
- Sudesh Lehri as Inspector Shinde
- Samir Kochhar as Ramesh
- Gulzar Dastur as Billo Aunty
- Farah Khan as Judge of Dancing Star (cameo appearance)
- Shaan as Judge of Dancing Star (cameo appearance)
- Chitrangada Singh as Judge of Dancing Star (cameo appearance)
- Pallavi Kulkarni (cameo appearance)

== Soundtrack ==
Munna Michael

Soundtrack album by Meet Bros, Tanishk Bagchi, Pranaay Rijia, Vishal Mishra, Javed-Mohsin, Gourov-Roshin and Vayu
- Released: 22 June 2017
- Recorded: 2016–2017
- Genre: Feature film soundtrack
- Length: 35:20
- Language: Hindi
- Label: Eros Music

The music for the film was composed by Meet Bros, Tanishk Bagchi, Pranaay Rijia, Vishal Mishra, Javed-Mohsin, Gourov-Roshin and Vayu, while the background score was composed by Sandeep Shirodkar. The lyrics were written by Kumaar, Danish Sabri, Pranaay, Tanishk-Vayu and Sabbir Khan. The album was released on 22 June 2017 by Eros Music on World Music Day and includes 10 songs.

Track listing
No.	Title	Lyrics	Music	Singer(s)	Length
1.	"Main Hoon"	Kumaar	Tanishk Bagchi	Siddharth Mahadevan	3:52
2.	"Ding Dang"	Danish Sabri, Sabbir Khan	Javed-Mohsin	Amit Mishra, Antara Mitra, Ikka	3:22
3.	"Pyar Ho"	Kumaar	Vishal Mishra	Sunidhi Chauhan, Vishal Mishra	4:12
4.	"Swag"	Kumaar, Sabbir Khan	Pranaay Rijia	Pranaay Rijia	2:39
5.	"Beparwah"	Kumaar	Gourov-Roshin	Siddharth Basrur, Nandini Deb	5:58
6.	"Shake Karaan"	Kumaar	Meet Bros	Meet Bros, Kanika Kapoor	4:10
7.	"Feel The Rhythm"	Pranaay Rijia, Sabbir Khan	Pranaay Rijia	Pranaay Rijia, Rahul Pandey	2:50
8.	"Beat It Bijuriya"	Vayu	Tanishk Bagchi, Vayu	Asees Kaur, Renesa Baagchi	2:17
9.	"Pyar Ho" (Redux)	Kumaar	Vishal Mishra	Sunidhi Chauhan	3:14
10.	"Swag Rebirth"	Kumaar, Sabbir Khan	Pranaay Rijia	Pranaay Rijia	2:46
Total length:					35:20

== Release ==
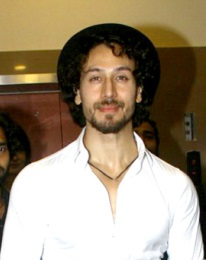
Tiger Shroff at Munna Michael screening

The film received a U/A certificate from CBFC and was released on 21 July 2017 worldwide.

== Reception ==
=== Critical reception ===
Munna Michael received mixed-to-negative reviews from critics.

Meena Lyer of The Times of India wrote "Tiger fans will have a field day with his breakdancing." Rohit Vats of Hindustan Times wrote "Everybody, including Tiger Shroff and Nawazuddin Siddiqui, is out of sync in this film."

Shalini Langer of The Indian Express wrote "This Tiger Shroff, Nidhhi Agerwal, Nawazuddin Siddiqui-starrer is a whole dance-action genre has nothing great about it." Subhani Singh of India Today wrote "Saving for a few dance sequences, there isn't much memorable in the film."

Udita Jhunjhunwala of Firstpost wrote "Munna Michael was written keeping in mind Tiger Shroff's best skills: dancing and action. Put in enough of these two elements and who cares about logic, story, acting or originality." Saibal Chaterjee of NDTV wrote "As is obvious, Tiger Shroff's film has nothing original or novel on offer."

Kriti Tulsiani of News18 wrote "Munna Michael feels like an over-stretched version of an 80s film that rides high only on dance moves and action sequences." Kennith Rosario of The Hindu wrote "A clichéd endorsement for Tiger Shroff's abs, fighting and dancing skills."

Sukanya Verma of Rediff and called the film as "A wasted opportunity at best."

Mohar Basu of Mid-Day wrote "There should be a genre of films called fan-pleasers, if there isn't one already. Munna Michael is precisely that by design – a dance-actioner that must keep its focus firmly on showcasing the dancing prowess of its leading man, Tiger Shroff." Bollywood Hungama wrote "Munna Michael has its moments but struggles due to weak writing. However, Tiger Shroff's fans would be a happy lot as the actor rocks the show with his dance and action."

Anupama Chopra of Film Companion said that the film was "the stuff of pure comedy." Davesh Sharma of Filmfare wrote "What this movie lacks is self-belief and great music. If the whole point of the film was to make it a tribute to Michael Jackson then MJ's original tunes should have been used." Shilpa Jamkhandikar of Reuters wrote "The story is straightforward and merely a device for Shroff to display his washboard abs and ample dancing skills."

=== Domestic ===
The film saw 15–20% occupancy on the first day and collected ₹6.65 crore (US$710,000) (net) from 3000 screens. It grossed ₹9.24 crore (US$990,000) total Worldwide on first day. Munna Michael became the 10th highest opening day grosser Bollywood film of 2017. On the second day the film collected ₹6.32 crore (US$680,000). Its two-day net collection rose to 12.97 crore and gross figures to ₹17.78 crore. The film grossed ₹34.61 crore in India in 4 days.

=== Overseas ===
On the first day in the overseas market, the film collected ₹4.21 lakh (US$4,500) from 24 screens in Australia, ₹2.31 lakh (US$2,500) from 7 screens in New Zealand, ₹10.29 lakh (US$11,000) from 50 screens in the UK, ₹9.29 lakh (US$9,900) from 58 screens in the United States, ₹3.45 lakh (US$3,700) from 13 screens in Canada. On second day, the film collected ₹2.39 lakh (US$2,600) from 16 screens in Australia and ₹2.70 lakh (US$2,900) from 6 screens in New Zealand. On third day, the film collected ₹1.97 lakh (US$2,100) from 15 screens in Australia and ₹1.19 lakh (US$1,300) from 7 screens in New Zealand. With that the film collected ₹37.80 lakh (US$40,000) from 196 screens in its first weekend overseas. On the first Monday, the film collected ₹1.39 lakh (US$1,500) from 19 screens in Australia, ₹55,057,000 (US$590,000) from 6 screens in New Zealand, ₹5.34 lakh (US$5,700) from 42 screens in the UK, ₹3.49 lakh (US$3,700) from 51 screens in the US and ₹1.42 lakh (US$1,500) from 13 screens in Canada. On fifth day of release, the film collected ₹1.25 lakh (US$1,300) from 17 screens in Australia and ₹77,907,000 (US$830,000) from 6 screens in New Zealand. The film earned 13.5 crore overseas.

== Accolades ==
Award ceremony	Category	Recipient	Result	Ref.(s)
10th Mirchi Music Awards	Lyricist of The Year	Kumaar - "Pyar Ho"	Nominated	
10th Mirchi Music Awards	Upcoming Music Composer of The Year	Vishal Mishra - "Pyar Ho"	Nominated	

== See also ==
- ABCD: Any Body Can Dance
- ABCD 2
- Street Dancer 3D
