= Meenal Jain =

Indian singer

- Born: Meenal Jain; 14 June 1985 (age 41); Indore, Madhya Pradesh, India
- Label: Sony BMG

Meenal Jain (born 14 June 1985) is an Indian singer, known as a playback singer in Indian films.

She participated and was a top 6 finalist in the reality show Indian Idol 2 in 2006.

== Life and career ==
Jain lives in Mumbai. She graduated from Mithibai College. Presently she is co-hosting a show "Music, Masti aur Dhoom". She also provided the singing voice for Barbie in the Hindi dubbed version of the 2007 animated film Barbie as the Island Princess. She also sang the song "Sakhi" in the television show Satyamev Jayate's seventh episode.

== Playback in Bollywood ==
- Palken Jhukao Na - Sehar (2005) with Swanand Kirkire and Music by Daniel B. George.
- Dua - No One Killed Jessica (2011) with Raman Mahadevan, Joi Barua, Amitabh Bhattacharya and music by Amit Trivedi
- Banarasiya - Raanjhanaa (2013) With Shreya Ghoshal, Anwesha Dutt Guptal
- Cutie Pie - Ae Dil Hai Mushkil (2016) With Pradeep Singh Sran, Nakash Aziz & Antara
- Sakhi - Satyamev Jayate
- Gaye Kaam Se - Laila Majnu (2018) With Dev Negi, Amit Sharma
- Kundali - Manmarziyaan (2018) with Meghna Mishra, Yashita Sharma
- Dostigiri (2018)
