= B. K. Samant =

Indian folk singer

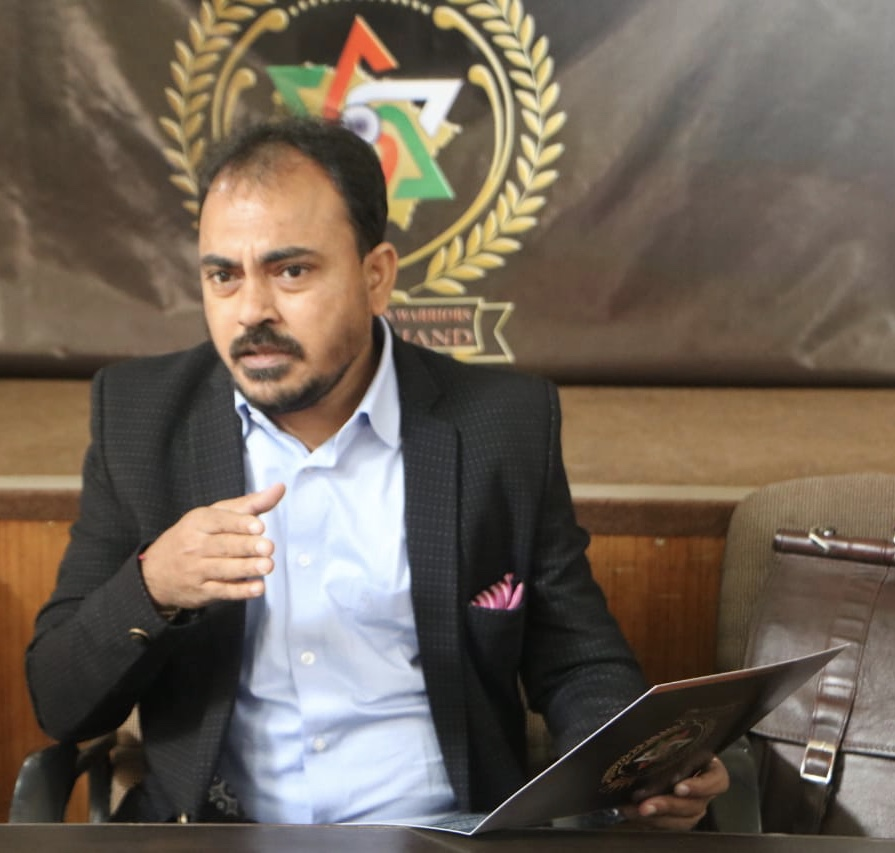
B. K. Samant

B K Samant is a folk singer, music director and lyricist from Uttarakhand, known for his viral song Thal Ki Bazar which is most viewed Kumauni or Garhwali music video on YouTube with over 60 million views.

== Personal life ==
He's born on 26 June 1982 in Singda village near Ghat Lohaghat nagar panchayat in Champawat district in the Indian state of Uttarakhand. Most of music his videos are locally shot.

== Discography ==
Year	Song	Note
2017	"Tujme Hi Mera Jahaan"	Lyrics only
2018	"Thal Ki Bazar"	Most viewed Kumaoni - Garhwali video song with 60 million plus views.
2018	"Yo Mero Pahad"	Beauty Of Mountains
2018	"Meri Bimu"	Love Song
2018	"Dor Teri"	Love Song
2018	"Devton Ka Thaan"	Pahadi Bhajan
2018	"Doli"	Love Song
2019	"Sat Janam Sat Vachan"	Pahari wedding song
2019	"Tu Ae Ja Au Pahad"	Released by Uttarakhand Chief Minister Trivendra Singh Rawat to address the issue of migration.
2020	"Binduli"	Love Song
2021	"Pancheshwar Baandh"	Emotional Song (River Dam Based)
2021	"O Baanj Jhupryaali Baanj"	Kumouni treditional Folk Song
2022	"Vytha Pahad Ki"	Counteraction of mountain area based song
2023	"Kumaun Darshan"	Beauty of kumaun region
2024	"Pasta Pizza"	B Kumauni satire song
2025	"Reshami Rumal"	Love song
2025	"Kashmir Border"	Patriotism Song Indian soldier and his family based song
2025	"Masi bazar"	Love song
2026	"Tu jo holi koi ta holi"	Sad romantic song
