= Rahul Pandey =

Rahul Pandey (राहुल पाण्डेय)
- Born: Rahul Pandey; 4 November kolkata, West Bengal, India
- Genres: Bollywood Music, Playback Singing in Hindi & Regional Films.
- Occupation: Bollywood Playback Singer
- Instruments: Guitar, keyboard, Ukulele.
- Years active: 2014–present
- Website: http://www.rahulpandeylive.com/

Rahul Pandey (Devanagari: राहुल पाण्डेय) is an Indian Bollywood Playback singer and Songwriter. He debuted in the Indian Film industry with the song Haseena Tu kameena Mein from the movie Happy Ending in 2014. In 2015 he sang the song Jab We Met from the movie Hero. Rahul Pandey sang two songs, Feel The Rhythm & Show Me Your Moves in Tiger Shroff starrer 'Munna Michael' (2017)

== Early life ==
Rahul Pandey was born to Mr. Hirdesh Pandey & Mrs. Renu Pandey in Kolkata, West Bengal. He did his early schooling from Birla High School, Kolkata and then finished his college studies from St. Xavier's College, Kolkata. For Post-graduation, he moved to Mumbai to pursue business management from IIPM, Mumbai. He is an MBA in Marketing. After completing MBA, Rahul worked with an MNC for a year and then joined a production house as the Brand Manager. After this, he got into music full-time and started chasing his dream of becoming a playback singer in 2012.

== Career ==
Rahul Pandey debuted with the Bollywood hit song Haseena tu kameena mein from the 2014 romantic comedy Hindi film Happy Ending. Rahul thereafter sang the song Jab We Met from the movie Hero. Rahul has also sung Telugu hits like Hey Akhil from the movie Akhil – The Power Of Jua and the song Alare Aala from the movie Soukhyam. Rahul also sang two songs Feel The Rhythm and Show Me Your Moves in Tiger Shroff starrer Munna Michael. Rahul has recently performed at Waltair Park, Vizag and rocked the show.

== Discography ==
Year	Song name	Film name	Language	Music director	Lyricist	Singer	Co-singers	Director	Producer
2014	Haseena Tu Kameena Mein	Happy Ending	Hindi	Sachin–Jigar	Amitabh Bhattacharya	Rahul Pandey	Shruti Pathak & Siddharth Basrur	Raj and D.K.	Saif Ali Khan, Dinesh Vijan, Sunil Lulla
2015	Jab We Met	Hero	Hindi	Sachin–Jigar	Niranjan Iyengar	Rahul Pandey	Shalmali Kholgade	Nikhil Advani	Salman Khan, Subhash Ghai
2015	Hey Akhil	Akhil – The Power Of Jua	Telugu	Anup Rubens	Krishna Chaitanya	Rahul Pandey	Anup Rubens	V. V. Vinayak	Nithiin, Sudhakar Reddy
2015	Alare Aala	Soukhyam	Telugu	Anup Rubens	Ramajogayya Sastry	Rahul Pandey	Manisha Eerabathini	A. S. Ravikumar Chowdary	V. Anand Prasad
2015	Na Jaane Kyun	Mere Genie Uncle	Hindi	Vandana Vadehra	Vandana Vadehra	Rahul Pandey	Gwen	Ashish Bhavsar	Raju Gada, Ashish Bhavsar, Paresh Mehta
2015	Kuchh Toh Ho Raha Hai	Tera Mera Tedha Medha	Hindi	Chittaranjan Tripathy	Swanand Kirkire	Rahul Pandey	Sachin	Chittaranjan Tripathy	Sanjiv Chopra
2016	Double Ok	Adhagappattathu Magajanangalay	Tamil	D. Imman	Yugabharathi	Rahul Pandey	NA	Inbasekhar	Siva Rameshkumar
2017	Feel The Rhythm	Munna Michael	Hindi	Pranaay	Pranaay, Sabbir Khan	Rahul Pandey	NA	Sabbir Khan	Viki Rajani

== Non Film Songs ==
Year	Song name	Album name	Singer(s)	Music composer	Remixed By	Lyricist	Music label
2014	The Deewana Remix	The Deewana Remix	Rahul Pandey	Jatin–Lalit	Dj Anshul	Sameer Anjaan	Sony Music Entertainment
2016	Aa Chalein	Aa Chalein Video Single	Rahul Pandey & Shivangi Bhayana	Manish Ch	NA	Sanjeev Anand Jha	Zee Music Company
