= Mohsin Shaikh =

- Born: Mohsin Shaikh; October 16, 1987 (age 38); Mumbai, Maharashtra
- Occupation(s): Indian Music composer and Lyricist
- Years active: 2012 – current

Mohsin Shaikh (born 16 October 1987) is an Indian lyricist and composer who is part of the Javed - Mohsin musical duo for Indian films. He is known predominantly for his work as a music composer and lyricist in Hindi cinema.

== Early life ==
Mohsin Shaikh was born in Mumbai to the writer Mustafa Shaikh and Safiya Shaikh.

== Singer ==
- 2020 - Suraj Pe Mangal Bhari ("Ladki Dramebaaz", "Dauda Dauda")

== Composer (as Javed-Mohsin) ==
- 2015 - Kis Kisko Pyaar Karoon (One song)
- 2017 - Munna Michael (One song)
- 2017 - Julie 2 (One song)
- 2018 - Jalebi (Two songs)
- 2019 - Drive (Two songs)
- 2020 - Suraj Pe Mangal Bhari (Five songs)
- 2020 - Coolie No.1 (One song)
- 2021 - Shershaah (Two songs)
- 2022 - Nikamma (Two songs)

== Lyricist ==
- 2020 - "Sawan Mein Lag Gayi Aag" - Ginny Weds Sunny (Composed by Payal Dev)
- 2022 - "Akdi Padki" - Liger (Composed by DJ Chetas - Lijo George, Sunil Kashyap)
