= Sonarika Bhadoria =

Indian actress(born 3 December 1992)

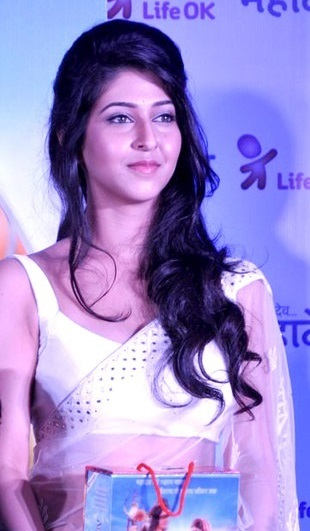
- Bhadoria in 2015
- Born: 3 December 1992 (age 33); Mumbai, Maharashtra, India
- Occupation: Actress
- Years active: 2011–present
- Known for: Devon Ke Dev...Mahadev; Prithvi Vallabh – Itihaas Bhi Rahasya Bhi; Dastaan-E-Mohabbat Salim Anarkali
- Spouse: Vikas Parashar (m. 2024)
- Children: 1

Sonarika Bhadoria (born 3 December 1992) is an Indian actress who primarily works in Hindi television and Telugu films. Bhadoria is best known for her portrayal of Goddess Parvati in Devon Ke Dev...Mahadev. She is also known for her role in the shows Prithvi Vallabh – Itihaas Bhi Rahasya Bhi and Dastaan-E-Mohabbat Salim Anarkali, and the films Speedunnodu and Eedo Rakam Aado Rakam.

== Early life and education ==
Bhadoria is from a Rajput clan of the Chambal River region. She was born and raised in Mumbai. She attended Yashodham High School and did her graduation from D. G. Ruparel College, Mumbai.

== Career ==
Bhadoria made her acting debut with Tum Dena Saath Mera, playing Abhilasha from 2011 to 2012 opposite Ankit Narang. From 2012 to 2013, she gained household recognition with her portrayal of Parvati in Devon Ke Dev...Mahadev opposite Mohit Raina.

In 2018, Bhadoria played Princess Mrinalvati in Prithvi Vallabh – Itihaas Bhi Rahasya Bhi opposite Ashish Sharma. She then played Anarkali in Dastaan-E-Mohabbat Salim Anarkali opposite Shaheer Sheikh, from 2018 to 2019. In 2019, Bhadoria played Netra Sharma Singh in Ishq Mein Marjawan, opposite Arjun Bijlani.

Bhadoria made her film debut with the Telugu film, Jadoogadu opposite Naga Shourya. In 2016, she first played the lead opposite Bellamkonda Sreenivas in Speedunnodu,. A critic of Deccan Chronicle noted, "Sonarika is glamorous and does her part well." Her second release of the year was Eedo Rakam Aado Rakam, opposite Vishnu Manchu. A 123telugu reviewer stated, "Even though Sonarika does well, she looks misfit in her homely role." She next made her Hindi film debut with Saansein, opposite Rajneesh Duggal in the same year.

In 2017, she had her Tamil debut with Indrajith opposite Gautham Karthik and in 2022, she appeared in the Hindi film Hindutva.

== Personal life ==
Bhadoria married her longtime boyfriend Vikas Parashar, on 18 February 2024, after nine years relationship. The Hindu wedding ceremony took place at the Nahargarh Palace, Ranthambore. The couple welcomed their first child, a daughter named Virika Parashar on 5 December 2025.

== Media image ==
In Times' Most Desirable Women on TV, she was placed 6th in 2017 and 9th in 2018.

== Filmography ==
=== Films ===
Year	Title	Role	Language	Ref.
2015	Jadoogadu	Parvathi	Telugu	
2016	Speedunnodu	Vasanthi	Telugu	
2016	Eedo Rakam Aado Rakam	Neelaveni	Telugu	
2016	Saansein	Shirin Grover	Hindi	
2017	Indrajith	Meetah	Tamil	
2022	Hindutva	Sapna Gupta	Hindi	

=== Television ===
Year	Title	Role	Ref.
2011-2012	Tum Dena Saath Mera	Abhilasha Sharma	
2012-2013	Devon Ke Dev...Mahadev	Parvati	
2018	Prithvi Vallabh – Itihaas Bhi Rahasya Bhi	Rajkumari Mrinalvati "Mrinal"	
2018–2019	Dastaan-E-Mohabbat Salim Anarkali	Anarkali	
2019	Ishq Mein Marjawan	Netra Sharma Singh	

=== Music videos ===
Year	Title	Singer(s)	Ref.
2021	Main Janu Na	Arjuna Harjai, Jonita Gandhi	
2022	Shonk Se	Afsana Khan, Gaurav Dev, and Kartik Dev	
2022	Naazneen	Uchana Amit	
