= Vivek Kar =

- Born: Sivasagar, Assam, India
- Occupations: Composer; Singer; Music director
- Years active: 2013–present
- Parent(s): Babul Kar; Rina Kar
- Relatives: Pranay Kar (brother)
- Musical career
- Genres: Pop; R&B; Bollywood
- Instruments: Drums; Guitars
- Labels: T-Series; Zee Music Company

Vivek Kar is an Indian bollywood film music director score composer and producer.

== Career ==
Working as a music composer, Kar made his debut as a film composer in Bollywood in the film Zindagi 50-50 where he composed four original songs.

Kar composed the songs for the film Meeruthiya Gangsters in 2015, One Night Stand in 2016, Gun & Goal in 2015, Care of Footpath 2 in 2015, Saansein, Direct Ishq in 2016.

The movie Care of Footpath 2, in which Vivek Kar was a music director, was a lateral entry to Oscars as well.

== Films as Music Composer ==
Year	Title	Other notes
2013	Zindagi 50-50	Music Composer
2015	Meeruthiya Gangsters	Music Composer
2015	Care of Footpath 2	Music Composer
2015	Gun & Goal	Music Composer
2015	Direct Ishq	Music Composer
2016	Saat Uchakkey	Music Composer
2016	One Night Stand	Music Composer
2016	Saansein	Music Composer
2017	Shaadi Mein Zaroor Aana	Music Composer
2018	Vitthal	Music Composer

== Songs ==
Film	Song	Singer	Lyricist	Year of release
Zindagi 50-50	Zindagi 50-50 (Title track)	Bappi Lahiri, Antara Mitra & Gufy	Deepak Agrawal	2013
Zindagi 50-50	Sadde Naal Aaja	Manak-E, Neha Batra & Gufy	Ashish Pandit	2013
Zindagi 50-50	Rabba	Rahat Fateh Ali Khan	Shabbir Ahmed	2013
Zindagi 50-50	Delhi Delhi	Dev Negi	Dev Negi & Vivek Kar	2013
Gun & Goal	Zig Zag	Meet Bros & Shipra Goyal	Kumaar	2015
Care of Footpath 2	Bullet Nanna	Girik Aman & Shipra Goyal	Raghu Niduvalli	2015
One Night Stand	Ki Kara	Shipra Goyal	Kumaar	2016
One Night Stand	Tum Mere	Dev Negi	Kumaar	2016
Saansein	Tum Jo Mile	Armaan Malik	Kumaar	2016
Saansein	Mera Ishq	Arijit Singh Ash King Swati Sharma	Kumaar	2016
Saansein	Dil Yeh Khamakha	Dev Negi	Kumaar	2016
Saansein	Tum Ho Mere	Najam Bajwa	Kumaar	2016
Saansein	Royi	Shibani Sur	Kumaar	2016
Saansein	Tum Jo Mile (Reprise)	Pratap Doodle, Amit Gupta	Kumaar	2016
Saansein	Dil Yeh Khamkha (Reprise)	Nikhil D'Souza	Kumaar	2016
Saansein	Tum Ho Mere (Unplugged)	Rajneesh Duggal & Vivek Verma	Kumaar	2016
Shaadi Mein Zaroor Aana	Royee Jande Naina	Nitin Gupta	Kumaar	2017
