= Ramleela – Ajay Devgn Ke Saath =

- Also known as: Ramleela
- Genre: Drama
- Written by: Neerav Ghosh; Swanand Kirkire; Manoj Muntashar; Nilay Upadhyay
- Directed by: Ashim Sen
- Creative directors: Kailash Gandhi and Soniya Kulkarni
- Presented by: Ajay Devgn
- Starring: see below
- Opening theme: Ramleela Ramleela
- Country of origin: India
- Original language: Hindi
- No. of episodes: 5

Production
- Executive producer: Prita Agni
- Producers: Wizcraft International; Andre Timmins; Viraf Sarkari; Sabbas Joseph
- Running time: About 47 minutes

Original release
- Network: Life OK
- Release: 21 October – 18 November 2012

Ramleela – Ajay Devgn Ke Saath (transl. Ramleela – With Ajay Devgn), commonly known as Ramleela, is a mythological on-stage musical drama, based on the Indian epic poem Ramayan. The show premiered on 21 October 2012 on Life OK and completed the story in five episodes on 18 November 2012. The show was narrated by Bollywood actor Ajay Devgn, who provided a prologue at the beginning of each episode or act. The show aired during the period from Dussehra (the day Rama killed Ravana) in October till Diwali in November (the day Rama returned to Ayodhya, after 14 years of exile).

The show was divided into 5- to 10-minute skits combined with songs and dances performed by the main cast and other actors. Bollywood actors and Indian television stars played the roles of the characters. The grand sets and choreographer Remo D'Souza were much appreciated.

== Plot ==
Sage Vishwamitra's rituals are plagued by demons. Young princes Rama and Lakshmana (sons of King Dasharatha of Ayodhya) of Ayodhya battle and defeat the demons once and for all. The sage then travels with the brothers to the kingdom of Mithila. In Mithila, princess Sita prays to Goddess Gauri for a good husband and meets Rama in the garden. The two instantly fall in love with each other. Sita's father, King Janaka organizes a Swyamvar to find a suitor for his daughter. As per the condition, the one who is able to mount an arrow on the mythical bow of Lord Shiva shall marry Sita. At the ceremony, only Ram is successful and he marries Sita.

In Rama's state, Ayodhya, maidservant Manthara poisons Queen Kaikeyi's (King Dasharatha's third and last wife) mind in asking King Dashratha for her two pending boons —to make her son Bharat the next king of Ayodhya and to exile Rama from Ayodhya for the next 14 years. With a heavy heart, King Dashrath exiles his sons Rama. Rama's half-brother, Lakshman, and wife Sita also accompany him. Stricken with grief, obedient half-brother Bharata begins to rule Ayodhya under the name of rightful King Rama, who begins his exile in Panchvati.

After 12 years, Ram, Lakshman, and Sita are well acquainted with the forest. But they are yet to meet the most feared villain of all times - Ravana. One day Ravana's sister, Surpanakha accidentally meets Rama and gets attracted to him. However, when he refuses, she advances to kill Sita but Lakshmana cuts her nose. Hearing this, an enraged Raavan remembers his shameful defeat in the court of Mithila, years ago, during Sita's Swayamvar. He disguises as a sage, tricks Ram and Lakshmana into leaving their hut, and abducts Sita in their absence. Ram and Lakshman arrive in time to find a fatally hurt Jatayu near their hut, who tells them about Sita's abduction.

On the other hand, Hanuman is in search of two young boys, who are known to have entered the forest of Kishkinda with bows and arrows. While on the lookout, his cronies locate Ram and Lakshman. Hanuman disguises as a sage and approaches them to find out that they are Rama and Lakshmana. When he learns this, his happiness knows no bounds.

With Hanuman's alliance, Ram and Lakshman help Sugreeva free the kingdom of Kishkindha and his wife, from his traitor brother Bali, in return for which, Sugreeva provides his army, the "Vaanar Sena" to search for Sita. They learn from the deceased Jatayu's brother Sampati that Sita has been imprisoned in the Ashok Vatika of Raavan's Lanka. Here in Lanka, Raavan threatens Sita, that if she doesn't accept him within a month, he will devour her rightfully.

Hanuman flies over the ocean and lands in Lanka. He successfully reaches the Ashok Vatika, where he imparts Ram's message to a distraught Sita. As he leaves, he destroys the Ashok Vatika to teach Raavan a lesson. Raavan's demons and sons capture Hanuman. Raavan orders his clergies to kill the monkey, but Vibhishan brings to his notice that it is Raavan's own rule that a king can punish a messenger, but not kill him. Raavan agrees upon this and asks his clergies to set fire to Hanuman's tail. As the clergies do so, Hanuman fights everyone and sets Lanka afire with his burning tail.

Hanuman comes back and they gear up to go to Lanka and fight against Raavan for his evil deed. They throw huge boulders into the ocean water, with "Shree Ram" written over them, and thus they make their way towards Lanka. While in Lanka, Lord Vishnu's greatest devotee, Vibhishan is worried about what will happen if Ram himself comes to Lanka. When he tries to bring his fears to Raavan's notice, Raavan tries to tempt Vibhishan with his wealth but when he fails, he kicks Vibhishan out of Lanka. But Ram greets Vibhishana in his army with great respect and honor.

A fierce battle sets, where Raavan's son, Meghanad fights Angada, Vibhishan, and Jambavan and defeats them. As Ram sets out to fight him, Lakshman chooses to fight instead and gets fatally injured in the attempt. A distraught Ram calls for help. Vaid Sushenu of Lanka arrives and examines Lakshman, only to admit that he is severely injured, and only a herb called "Sanjeevani", located in the mountain ranges of Himalayas can save his life. Ram requests Hanuman to get the herb in time, which Hanuman readily agrees to and sets out immediately. But in the mountain ranges, Hanuman faces a challenge when the mountain asks him to answer certain questions before they tell him the location of the herb. As Hanuman notices that time is running out, he lifts the mountain and flies his way back with it and saves Lakshman's life.

Just before the war, Raavan asks his soldiers to wake up his brother, Kumbhakarana, who has been sleeping for 6 months. After he wakes up he fights Ram in the battlefield but is killed. Ravan also receives the news of Meghnad's death. Raavan's wife Mandodari breaks down as she hears this, and tries convincing her husband to return Sita but Raavan ignores her pleas. In the battlefield, Ravana fights Ram and his army, and after much of a showdown, Vibhishan tells Ram the secret of Raavan's survival. Ram sets a bow towards Raavan's belly and kills him.

After the battle, Ram and Sita finally meet and everyone returns to Ayodhya, where the royal family and especially, Bharat are awaiting their arrival. The city of Ayodhya rejoices their beloved king's arrival and celebrates Diwali on the occasion.

== Cast ==
- Ajay Devgn as Narrator
- Rajneesh Duggal as Rama sita's husband
- Richa Pallod as Sita, Rama's wife
- Aniruddh Singh as Lakshmana, Urmila's husband
- Suhasi Goradia Dhami as Urmila, Lakshman's wife
- Mahesh Thakur as Janaka Sita and Urmila's father
- Eva Ahuja as Kaushalya Dashrath's 1st wife
- Khushboo Grewal as Kaikeyi king Dashrath's 2nd wife
- Abhishek Avasthi as Hanuman
- Aman Verma as Ravana
- Sanjeeda Sheikh as Surpanakha (Human form)
- Mamta Rathod as Surpanakha (Rakshasa form)
- Bharat Kundra as Prince Bharat
- Yatin Karyekar as Dasharatha Kaushalya, Kaikeyi and Sumitra's husband
- Usha Nadkarni as Manthra
- Priyank Tatariya as Sage Vishwamitra
- Shampa as Lankini 1
- Kruti as Lankini 2
- Mayuresh Wadekar as Angada
- Jaya Bhattacharya as Mandodari Ravana's wife
- Amit Pachori as Vibhishana
- Nabeel Qureshi as Jatayu
- Saifullah Rahamani as Sugreeva
- Deepak Tokas as Meghanad
- Mohd. Islahuddeen Shaikh as Kumbhkaran

=== Musical cast ===
- Rahul Vaidya as a voice of Rama
- Madhushree as a voice of Sita
- Sadhna Sargam as a voice of Urmila
- Vijay Prakash

== Music ==
Music is composed by various composers from Bollywood. Composers include Anu Malik, Piyush Kanojia, Sidharth - Suhas, Raju Singh, Yogesh Pradhan, Sanjeev Thomas, Mukesh Parmar and Gulraj Singh Ghumman. Lyrics were penned by Swanand Kirkire, Roop, Rajshekhar, and Kausar Munim.

=== Songs ===
#	Song	Artist(s)	Composer
1	Ramleela Ramleela (the title track)	Various artists	Anu Malik
2	Raghupati Raghav Raja Ram	Various artists	Raju Singh
3	Laagi Re Laagi Lagan (for Sita's Swayamvar)	Saurabh Shrivastav, Aditi Paul, Shail Hada, Hricha Narayan, Ravinder Upadhyay, Deepak Joshi, Manish Joshi	Yogesh Pradhan
4	Choupaiyaa	Vijay Prakash	Sidharth - Suhas
5	Jaao Na Morey Piya	Sadhna Sargam	Piyush Kanojia
6	Zindagi	Various artists	Sidharth - Suhas
7	Main Hoon Raavan	Shail Hada, Saurabh Shrivastav, Dipali Sathe	Yogesh Pradhan
8	Main Kahe Kanwari (for Surpanakha)	Neeti Mohan	Sanjeev Thomas
9	Jai Jai Jai Hanuman	Raman Mahadevan, Ritika Das, Abhirup Dass, Ameya Mahalaxmikar, Dhanashree Pawar, Ananya Guha, Siddhi Vetal	Gulraj Singh Ghumman
10	Mayavi Lanka Raavan Ki (for Lankini)	Khushboo Jain, Utsav Bangia, Shriram	Sidharth - Suhas
11	Mayavi Lanka Raavan Ki (for Vibhishana)	Various artists	Sidharth - Suhas
12	Haiyya Re Haiyya Re	Siddharth Mahadevan, Arsalaan Akhoon, Rajeev Sundaresan, Arnab Dutta	Gulraj Singh Ghumman
13	Sia Ram Hanuman	Swaroop Khan, Naresh Chatterjee, Sanjeev Thomas	Sanjeev Thomas
14	Kumbhakarana	Aman Prikha, Shivam Pathak, Mukesh Parmar	Mukesh Parmar
15	Siyavar Ram Laye Ujiyale	Various artists	Raju Singh
