= Gurpreet Singh (actor) =

Indian actor (born 1978)

- Born: 1978 (age 47–48); New Delhi, India
- Occupations: Film, television actor
- Height: 1.8 m (5 ft 11 in)

Gurpreet Singh is an Indian TV and film actor. He is best known for his lead role as Sujal Grewal in Kahiin to Hoga which aired on Star Plus.

== Personal life ==
Gurpreet Singh was born on 28 November 1978 in a Sikh family in New Delhi. He married Punjabi music video model Kanishka Sodhi aka Gurpreet kaur sodhi in 2005 and filed for divorce in 2010 and got divorced in 2021.

== Career ==
The role which gave Gurpreet the major breakthrough was of Sujal Garewal from the serial Kahiin to hoga on Star Plus channel. He has worked in the film Phhir produced by Vikram Bhatt, Madhubala and Bhayy. He has also acted in other TV serials like Saarrthi on Star Plus, Maayka on Zee tv and Durgesh Nandinii on Sony TV. He has also featured in a music video Sajanwa, directed by Anurag Basu.

== Filmography ==
Year	Movie	Role	Co-Star	Notes
2006	Madhubaala	Malhar		Hindi film
2011	Phhir		Adah Sharma, Rajneesh Duggal	Hindi film
2015	Bhayy	Manu		Hindi film
2013	Okkadine		Nara Rohit, Nithya Menen	Telugu film

== Television ==
Year	Tv Serial	Role	Notes
2005–2007	Kahiin to Hoga	Sujal Garewal /Tushar	
2007–2008	Saarrthi	Rudr Singh	
2007–2008	Durgesh Nandinii	Sikandar	
2008–2009	Maayka	Parmeet	
2013–2014	Mahabharat	Vidharbha Kumar Rukmi	
2014	Rangrasiya	Rohit	
2017–2018	Porus	King Ambhi	
2018–2019	Tantra	Rohit	
2022	Naagin 6	Karan Mehra	
2024	Chand Jalne Laga	Prakash	
2024	Shiv Shakti – Tap Tyaag Tandav	Bhagiratha	
2024	Vanshaj	Rafique Baig	
2025	Chalo Bulawa Aya Hai, Mata Ne Bulaya Hai	Param	
