= Direct Ishq =

- Theatrical release poster
- Directed by: Rajiv S Ruia
- Written by: A. M. Turaz; Bobby Khan
- Produced by: Pradeep K. Sharma
- Starring: Rajneesh Duggal; Nidhi Subbaiah; Arjun Bijlani; Rajesh Shingarpure; Arun Behll
- Cinematography: Suresh Beesaveni
- Edited by: Shiva Bayappa
- Music by: Vivek Kar; Tanisq; sabir khan; Raeth (Band)
- Production company: Baba Motion Pictures Pvt Ltd
- Release date: 19 February 2016 (India)
- Running time: 130 minutes
- Country: India
- Language: Hindi
- Budget: ₹22 crore
- Box office: ₹56 lakh

Direct Ishq (transl. Direct love) is a 2016 Indian action romantic comedy film, set in the city of Banaras. The film features Rajneesh Duggal, Nidhi Subbaiah and Arjun Bijlani. It was released on 19 February 2016.

== Cast ==
- Rajneesh Duggal as Vicky Shukla
- Nidhi Subbaiah as Dolly Pandey
- Arjun Bijlani as Kabir Bajpai
- Rajesh Shringapure as Rawde Bhau
- Arun Behl as Vicky's sidekick
- Hemant Pandey
- Rajkumar Kanojia as Vicky's sidekick
- Padam Singh as Kabir's partner
- Manish Nadan Prasad as Chidiyan

== Soundtrack ==
The music was composed by Tanishk Bagchi, Vivek Kar, Raeth (Band), Sabir Khan and released by Zee Music Company.

Direct Ishq

Soundtrack album by Tanishk Bagchi, Vivek Kar, Raeth (Band), Sabir Khan
- Released: 21 January 2016
- Recorded: 2016
- Genre: Soundtrack
- Length: 35:34
- Label: Zee Music Company
- Producer: Tanishk Bagchi, Vivek Kar, Raeth (band), Sabir Khan

Track list
No.	Title	Lyrics	Music	Singer(s)	Length
1.	"Duwa Mein"	A. M. Turaz	Tanishk Bagchi	Swati Sharma	6:03
2.	"Nimboo Sa Ishq"	A. M. Turaz	Tanishk Bagchi	Nikhil D'Souza, Swati Sharma, Mridul	5:42
3.	"Direct Ishq" (Title Track)	A. M. Turaz	Tanishk Bagchi	Nakash Aziz, Swati Sharma, Arjun Daga	4:29
4.	"Toote Tare"	A. M. Turaz	Raeth (Band)	Swati Sharma	5:33
5.	"Aan Baam"	A. M. Turaz	Sabir Khan	Ustad Anwar Khan Manganiyar	3:24
6.	"Ganga Maiya"	A. M. Turaz	Vivek Kar	Swati Sharma	3:50
7.	"Mera Kissa"	A. M. Turaz	Vivek Kar	Swati Sharma	3:32
8.	"Mera Kissa" (Unplugged)	A. M. Turaz	Vivek Kar	Swati Sharma	3:01
Total length:					35:34
