= Modi: Journey of a Common Man =

Hindi-language web series

Modi: Journey of a Common Man is an Indian Hindi-language biographical web series exploring the early life and political career of Narendra Modi, the prime minister of India. It is based on the 2015 book Common Man's PM - Narendra Modi written by author Kishor Makwana. The show offers a fictionalized account of Modi's rise from humble beginnings to becoming one of the most influential figures in Indian politics. Produced by Eros Now and created by Umesh Shukla, the series provides a narrative of the challenges and triumphs encountered by Modi throughout his life.

== Cast ==
- Ashish Sharma as adult Narendra Modi
- Faisal Khan as teenage Narendra Modi
- B Shantanu as Dalpat
- Prachee Shah Paandya as Jashodaben Modi
- Om Bhatt as Amrutlal Modi
- Darshan Jariwala
- Mahesh Thakur as Chief Minister Narendra Modi
- Dhaval Pandya as Amit Shah

== Series overview ==
Season	Episodes	Originally released	
Season	Episodes	First released	Last released
1	7	2019	2019
2	3	2020	2020

== Reception ==
Archika Khurana of The Times of India rated 3 and 2.5 out of 5 for Season 1 and 2 respectively. He praises performances and writing but criticised direction in Season 1. He criticised Season 2 for performances and mildly praised the writing. Nandini Ramnath of Scroll considered it a "hagiography". Sampada Sharma of The Indian Express called it "hero worship" in her early impressions of the show and criticised the mixing of fact and fiction.
