= Eedo Rakam Aado Rakam =

- Theatrical release poster
- Directed by: G. Nageswara Reddy
- Screenplay by: G. Nageswara Reddy
- Story by: Smeep Kang; Naresh Kathooria
- Based on: Carry On Jatta
- Produced by: Krishna Kishore Garikipati; Sunkara Ramabrahmam
- Starring: Vishnu Manchu; Raj Tarun; Sonarika Bhadoria; Hebah Patel; Rajendra Prasad
- Cinematography: Suman Allakatla
- Edited by: Devatha Viswa
- Music by: Sai Karthik
- Production company: A.K. Entertainments
- Release date: 14 April 2016
- Running time: 129 minutes
- Country: India
- Language: Telugu

Eedo Rakam Aado Rakam (transl. This One's a Type, That One's Another Type), is a 2016 Telugu-language romantic comedy film, produced by Sunkara Ramabrahmam on A.K. Entertainments banner and directed by G. Nageswara Reddy. It features Vishnu Manchu, Raj Tarun, Sonarika Bhadoria and Hebah Patel while Rajendra Prasad appears in a crucial supporting role and music composed by Sai Karthik. The film is based on Punjabi film Carry On Jatta (2012) which was inspired by the Malayalam movie Chakkikotha Chankaran (1989).

The film's music was released on 26 March 2016 in Hyderabad. The film released worldwide on 14 April 2016.

== Cast ==
- Vishnu Manchu as Arjun
- Raj Tarun as Ashwin
- Sonarika Bhadoria as Neelaveni
- Hebah Patel as Supriya
- Rajendra Prasad as Advocate Narayana
- Posani Krishna Murali as Inspector M. Koteswara Rao
- Sunil in a cameo appearance
- Ravi Babu as Aadi Narayana
- Abhimanyu Singh as Gaja, Neelaveni's brother
- Vennela Kishore as Kishore
- Thagubothu Ramesh as Rikshawala
- Supreeth as Dattu, Supriya's brother
- Prabhas Sreenu as Seenu
- Fish Venkat as Henchman
- Shakalaka Shankar as Tenant
- Kadambari Kiran as Constable
- Tarzan as Constable
- Satya Krishnan as Satya
- Hema as Supriya's sister-in-law
- Geetha Singh as Zarina
- Sri Sudha Bhimireddy
- Soundarya(Photo appearance)

== Soundtrack ==
Eedo Rakam Aado Rakam

Soundtrack album by Sai Karthik
- Released: 26 March 2016
- Recorded: 2015–2016
- Genre: Feature film soundtrack
- Length: 13:48
- Language: Telugu
- Label: Think Music India
- Producer: Sai Karthik

Sai Karthik chronology
Raja Cheyyi Vesthe (2016)	Eedo Rakam Aado Rakam (2016)	Supreme (2016)

The music was composed by Sai Karthik and Think Music India holds the audio rights for the film. Music was released on 26 March 2016 at Taj Deccan in Hyderabad. Vishnu Manchu's father, Mohan Babu, was the chief guest for the event.

No.	Title	Lyrics	Singer(s)	Length
1.	"O Neelaveni"	Bhaskarbhatla Ravikumar	Ranjith	3:40
2.	"Pattuko Nannu Pattuko"	Ramajogayya Sastry	Sai Charan, Aparna	3:02
3.	"Ko Ko Kodi"	Bhaskarbhatla Ravikumar	Baba Sehgal, Revanth, Krishna Chaitanya, Divija, Karthick, Roll Rida	3:54
4.	"Eedo Rakam Aado Rakam"	Bhaskarbhatla Ravikumar	Deepu	3:12
Total length:				13:48

== Release and reception ==
The film was released theatrically on 14 April 2016. The film was a commercial success.

Critical reception was mixed. A critic from the Deccan Chronicle wrote that "Technically the film is average and the climax could have been better, it seemed that they were in a hurry to finish it". A review at Idlebrain found the first part "mediocre".
