= Luv You Shankar =

- Directed by: Rajiv S. Ruia
- Story by: Sanjay Masoom
- Produced by: Tejas Desai; Sunita Desai
- Starring: Shreyas Talpade; Tanishaa; Sanjay Mishra; Abhimanyu Singh; Kurush Deboo; Hemant Pandey
- Cinematography: Atul Parashar
- Edited by: Parth Y. Bhatt; Abhiishek Mehta
- Music by: Vardan Singh
- Production company: S D World Film Production Pvt Ltd
- Release date: 19 April 2024
- Running time: 117 mins
- Country: India
- Language: Hindi
- Budget: ₹8 crore

Luv You Shankar is a 2024 Indian Hindi-language mythological animated drama film directed by Rajiv S. Ruia and produced by Tejas Desai and Sunita Desai under the banner of S D World Film Production Pvt Ltd. The film stars Shreyas Talpade and Tanishaa will be seen in the film as lead roles. The film was theatrically released on 19 April 2024.

== Synopsis ==
It tells the story of an eight-year-old boy who develops a special bond with Lord Shiva/Shankar, a Hindu deity. Their connection takes them on an exciting journey of faith, friendship, and self-discovery.

== Cast ==
- Shreyas Talpade as Rudra
- Tanishaa as Geeta
- Sanjay Mishra
- Abhimanyu Singh as Siddheswar
- Kurush Deboo
- Hemant Pandey
- Elakshi A Gupta as Kavita
- Mann Gandhi as Shivansh
- Prateek Jain

== Reception ==
Abhishek Srivastava of The Times of India rated with 2.5 out of 5 stars and noted "While ‘Luv You Shankar’ initially shows promise with flashy glimpses of past events, the hope for an engaging plot quickly fades away, turning the film into a disappointment."
