= Aarambh: Kahaani Devsena Ki =

- Also known as: Aarambh
- Genre: Historical fiction
- Written by: V. Vijayendra Prasad; R M Joshi; Neha Singh
- Directed by: Goldie Behl
- Creative directors: Ranjeet Bahadur, Dhananjay Gour, Shouvik Bhadra
- Starring: Karthika Nair; Rajneesh Duggal
- Theme music composer: Shankar Eshaan Loy
- Opening theme: 'Ek sach tera, Ek sach mera, Takraye to bane sach naya' by Mahalaxmi Iyer and Siddharth Mahadevan
- Country of origin: India
- Original language: Hindi
- No. of seasons: 1
- No. of episodes: 24

Production
- Producers: Shrishti Arya; Goldie Behl
- Camera setup: Multi-camera
- Running time: 43 minutes
- Production company: Rose Audio Visuals

Original release
- Network: StarPlus
- Release: 24 June – 10 September 2017

Aarambh: Kahaani Devsena Ki (transl. Initiation: Story of Devasena)is an Indian historical fiction television series, produced by Rose Audio Visuals. It was aired on StarPlus, on weekends, from 24 June 2017 to 10 September 2017. The story revolves around the rivalry between the Dravidians and Aryans. The story was written by V. Vijayendra Prasad. The title song is sung by Mahalaxmi Iyer and Siddharth Mahadevan.

As the series did not receive expected ratings, it ended with 24 episodes which was earlier planned for 32 episodes.

== Plot ==
Set in ancient India during the decline of the Indus Valley Civilization and beginning of the Vedic age, this epic follows a saga of war between the Dravidians and the Aryans. In Arambh, Devasena, the daughter of Chamundi, leads Dravidians in a battle against the Aryans. However, she meets Varundev on the battlefield and falls in love with him, despite knowing that he is an Aryan.

== Cast and characters ==
- Karthika Nair as Devasena - The princess and heir to the Dravidian throne. She was beautiful, loyal and brave. She sacrificed her life for love and her dynasty.
  - as Devsena - Devsena is reincarnated and named after the warrior queen. She is also a destiny child and is believed to bring back the lost lands of the Dravidians. She is a skilled and intelligent warrior who has the power of cold manipulation.
- Rajniesh Duggal as Varundev: an Aryan chieftain. He was a loyal and skilled warrior.
  - as Jaldev/Shivgam (disguise name), the reincarnation of Varundev and one of the destiny kids with Hydrokinetic energy. He is appointed to accomplish a mission, that of killing Devasena.
- Aarav Chowdhary Purohit Indramitra, descendant of Agnimitra. He is also a leading man of the Aryans with equally divine powers, as his ancestor, Agnimitra. His only aim is to destroy the Dravidians and their Princess Devsena.
- Vipul Gupta as Veer Abhrook: an Aryan chieftain. He was a master of disguise. He was initially jealous of Varundev but later befriended him, after Varundev father's sacrificed himself to save him.
- Tej Sapru as Head Purohit Agnimitra of the Aryans. He was a leader of the Aryans and was known as a devoted disciple of Indra.
- Salman Shaikh as Sivaan: Varundev's dearest friend. He was the Aryans' navigator. He influenced Varundev to love Devsena.
- Tarun Khanna as Veer Kayasth: an Aryan chieftain. Varundev saved him from Nimchas, but he was seriously injured and died. He is later replaced by Varundev.
- Tanuja as Hahuma - The soothsayer and protector of the Dravidian throne. She is surrounded by numerous snakes who control her. She lives for over 400 years and leads the Dravidians. Though she is a clairvoyant, she was unable to clearly define the circumstances.
- Joy Sengupta as Arvamudan – Devsena's father and her primary caretaker and trainer. He was saved by Varundev in the battlefield. As per Dravidian law, since he is saved by the enemy, he is punished with walk of shame and is ordered to be beheaded, which is not approved by Devsena. Devsena crowned herself, as the queen, to give her father a respectful death and killed him.
- Haanssa Singh as Dayalini, Devsena's aunt and the other caretaker. She was cunning and evil. Power-hungry, she strived to kill Devsena and become the queen.
- Usha Jadhav as Thangam, Chief Knight of the Dravidians. She was a ruthless warrior.
- Shahbaz Khan as Jaldev's father.
- Dolly Sohi as Jaldev's mother.
- Manish Khanna as Vishwadeep
- Actor Nishant Tanwar as Mahisha, one of the destiny kids. He is engaged to Devsena. He is sent by Queen Syala to abduct Devsena's father. He has the power of pyrokinesis.
- Kunal Bhatia as Manikarnika, a transgender priestess in Mahishi Devi temple. She has the power to manipulate the earth.
- Madhoo as Queen Sambhavija/ Padmavija of Sambhav Pradesh, Identical twin sisters.
- Paras Chhabra as Kaal Ketu, a man with the power of shifting shape, is appointed to kill Devsena. He is later frozen and smashed to death by Devsena.
- Yashashri Masurkar as Princess Mekhla, daughter of Padmavija. She is vivacious and beautiful. She falls in love with Jaldev. She has a special bond with her sister, Devsena.
- Soni Singh as Queen Syala, ruler of one of the Dravidian territories. She is unmarried and adores Silambhan. She plots to kill Sambhavija and abduct Silambhan, her former lover.
- Vaquar Shaikh as Silambhan, husband of Sambhavija. He is a loyal husband and supports his wife Sambhavija in her decisions. He is unaware that Padmavija summoned Sambhavija.

=== Special appearances ===
- Pawan Kalyan as Dronachari, a mighty king

== Production ==
Aarambh is a high budgeted series with ₹1 crore spent for each sequence. Before its premiere, the series was promoted at India Gate in New Delhi.

Writer Vijayendra Prasad quoted "This is a creation of a parallel world of heroism. My story of Devsena will be the first and only narration of a woman so strong that she could rule the world of patriarchy by knowledge and sword. This is the only project which has brought me to the small screen".

To increase its viewership, it went through many changes including a 200 years leap and a change in its title from Aarambh to Aarambh: Kahaani Devasena Ki.

== Reception ==
The Quint wrote, "The show promos - visually, it didn’t seem as great as we had seen in Mahadev, Mahakumbh and Siya Ke Ram. Over all, the performances and execution of Aarambh was quite average. It failed to connect with the viewer."

Anvita Singh of India Today wrote, "It promises good things; like a tight script, decent acting, and some great visual effects. The treatment of the basic 'plot' is not completely bizarre. The scenes chase each other, and the pilot packs in a lot of information. Rajniesh Duggall (Varundev), Karthika Nair (Devasena), Tarun Khanna (Veer Kayast), and Tanuja (Hahumaa) were believable."
