= Tum Dena Saath Mera (2011 TV series) =

- Genre: Drama
- Written by: Rajita Sharma, Garima & Manish
- Directed by: Viveck Budakoti, Qaeed Kuwajerwala, Fahad Kashmiri & Naresh Khanna
- Creative director: Neha Kothari
- Starring: Sonarika Bhadoria; Ankit Narang; Khushboo Grewal; Priya Wal
- Music by: Dony Hazarika
- Opening theme: "Tum Dena Saath Mera"
- Country of origin: India
- Original language: Hindi
- No. of episodes: 116

Production
- Producers: Rajita Sharma and Viveck Budakoti
- Production location: Mumbai
- Cinematography: Anil Singh
- Running time: 20 minutes
- Production company: Magic Lantern Productions

Original release
- Network: Life OK
- Release: 19 December 2011 – 21 April 2012

Tum Dena Saath Mera is an Indian soap opera which premiered on Life OK on 19 December 2011 and ran until 21 April 2012. The series chronicles the lives of newlyweds Abhilasha and Manan, who move to Mumbai, revolving around their romance and their lives in metropolitan Mumbai.

== Background ==
Abhilasha (born 19 November 1992), belonging to a small town of Sagar is married to Manan (born 2 April 1989), born and brought up in Bhopal. Married by an arranged match, the young couple have dreams in their eyes and hopes in their heart as they begin their marital life. Manan bags a lucrative job in Mumbai just after marriage. A typical ambitious middle class young lad, Manan sets off to the big city chasing his dreams and ambitions. What remains to be seen is if Abhilasha can adjust in a culturally alienating milieu of Metropolitan Mumbai or not. Life throws constant surprises at them in the city of dreams, at times not so pleasant, however it's their love that gives them the courage to fight against all odds and sail through the tough tides.

== Plot ==
In the series, Abhilasha (born 19 November 1992) lives in the small town of Sagar and is married to Manan (born 2 April 1989), who was raised in Bhopal. A naïve and emotionally dependent woman, she desires love and a simple life. The ambitious Manan soon receives a job offer in Mumbai, and the couple move there.

In the city, Abhilasha and Manan find it difficult to adjust, especially Abhilasha, who has to live with Manan's friend Siddharth. The couple later move house, and Manan receives a promotion.

When Manan's sister Riddhi's wedding is called off due to dowry demands, his mother and sister move to Mumbai. Manan's father helps him buy a house in Mumbai.

Manan's family travels to Mumbai for Holi to surprise the couple. The following morning, his mother, Seema, catches her intoxicated son trying to kiss his wife in public and slaps him. Disappointed in both her son and daughter-in-law, she takes control of the household.

The new managing director of Manan's company is Ria Oberoi, a woman whom Manan had helped after she became drunk at a club. She mistakenly believes Manan to be the man who assaulted her at the hotel. He tries to clear up the misunderstanding. Unaware that Manan is married, Ria gradually becomes attracted to him and woos him with gifts and a promotion. When she proposes to him and he indirectly refuses, she vows to force him to marry her.

While Seema advises Abhilasha on how to win her husband back, Manan begins an affair with Ria. When Ria visits Manan, he introduces Abhilasha as his sister-in-law. After he leaves for work, Siddharth visits Abhilasha and tells her that Manan and Ria have gone to Pune.

== List of characters ==
=== Abhilasha Sharma (Sonarika Bhadoria) ===
Abhilasha (born 14 July 1994) is a very sweet girl from the town of Sagar and gets married at a young age. Later on, she shifts to Mumbai with her husband. Abhilasha often helps people without expecting anything in return, through which her kindness shines through. She is very innocent and somewhat naive.

=== Manan Sharma (Ankit Narang) ===
Manan (born 2 April 1989) lives with his father Subodh Sharma (Ajay Rohila), mother Seema Sharma (Bharti Patil), and siblings Sumit Sharma and Riddhi Sharma. Manan is a very romantic guy at heart and loves and respects his wife. He is also stubborn and ambitious, likes to do things his way, chasing a better future.

=== Siddharth Varma ===
Siddharth is Manan's childhood friend. Siddharth resides in Mumbai with his roommate Deep. Both of them work together. During childhood, Siddharth never paid strict attention to his academic career and left for Mumbai in search of opportunities away from Bhopal.

=== Samyukta ===
Samyukta is the hard yet gentle, co-worker of Siddharth and Deep. She is a sophisticated female and a feminist at heart.

=== Shaila Mehta (Khushboo Kochhar Grewal) ===
Shaila is a senior official of the company where Manan, Siddharth, Samyukta, and Deep work. She is a shrewd, disciplined, and strict businesswoman who keeps her personal and professional lives separate from each other.

=== Rajeev ===
Rajeev is a senior official who is also part of the company. Rajeev is a cunning businessman who always has ulterior motives behind every action. Rajeev and his wife Aastha allow Manan and Abhilasha to live in their empty flat in Goregaon. It is revealed that Rajeev is having affairs behind Aastha's back, using Manan and Abhilasha's home for his sexual encounters. Later, Rajeev leaves the company to work as a Senior Executive Manager in London.

=== Pooja Shinoy ===
Pooja is a married woman who lives next door to Manan and Abhilasha. Abhilasha finds a close friend in Pooja who advises her often on the ways a Mumbai resident should live her life.

=== Ria Oberoi (Preet Kaur Madhan) ===
Originally, the role was played by (Priya Wal). Ria is a new employee of the company where Manan, Siddharth, Samyukta, and Deep work. She succeeds Shaila Mehta as the new senior official. Unbeknownst to her, Manan, Siddharth, and Deep (with whom her path crossed at a club) are her employees. She does not like Manan and is initially hellbent on teaching him a lesson. However, later she falls in love with Manan. And they live happily ever after
