= Geetanjali Mishra =

Indian television actress

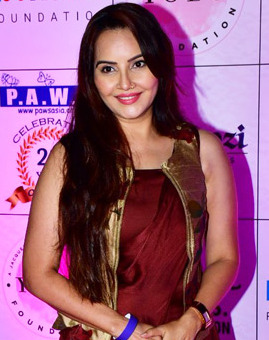
- Geetanjali Mishra in 2023
- Born: 6 November 1986 (age 39); Bombay, Maharashtra, India
- Occupations: Actress, social worker
- Known for: Virodh; Ludo; Kundali Bhagya; Crime Patrol; Rangrasiya; Balika Vadhu

Geetanjali Mishra (born 6 November 1986) is an Indian actress who appears in Hindi television, Web series and films. She plays the main lead Rajesh (Rajjo) in And tv’s show Happu Ki Ultan Paltan. She is known for her work in Mx Player's web series Virodh, Crime Patrol, Kundali Bhagya, Balika Vadhu, Naagin, Rangrasiya, Savdhaan India, and Aghori. In 2020, Mishra starred in Anurag Basu's film Ludo.

In 2025, Mishra became the team owner of team Net Ninjas at Indian Pro Badminton League

== Career ==
Despite working in various television shows as important characters, Mishra rose to fame for her numerous characters in Crime Patrol.

In 2018, she played the roles of Rani Lakshmi in Prithvi Vallabh and Amrita in Naagin 3.

In 2019, she starred in Aghori as Dravya.

In 2020, she starred in Anurag Basu's film Ludo, and ZEE5's Abhay Season 2. She also made a cameo appearance in Kartik Purnima, in the same year. She portrayed Mahira's mother, Ramona Khanna, in Kundali Bhagya.

In 2021, Mishra explored a new horizon in the form of a music video, "Dunaali", with MD Desi Rockstar.

In 2022, she again featured as the main lead in another music video, "Jodi", with MD Desi Rockstar, which was produced by Celeb Connex.

In 2023, Mishra joined as the main lead in &Tv’s show Happu Ki Ultan Paltan.

== Awards ==
- Best actress for a short film - Living Idle

== Filmography ==
All projects are in Hindi, unless mentioned otherwise.

=== Drama TV series ===
Year	Show	Character	Channel	Ref
2006–08	Sangam	Sagar's sister	Star Plus	
2010–11	Maati ki Banno	Sunaina	Colors TV	
2011	Maayke Se Bandhi Dor	Anju	Star Plus	
2014	Rangrasiya	Maithili Ranavat	Colors TV	
2015	Ek Lakshya	Sakshi	Doordarshan	
2016	Diya Aur Baati Hum	Shilpi	Star Plus	
2016–17	Chandranandini	Maharani Sunanda	Star Plus	
2014–2015	Balika Vadhu	Sona	Colors TV	
2018	Naagin 3	Amrita	Colors TV	
2018	Prithvi Vallabh	Rani Lakshmi	Sony TV	
2019	Aghori	Dravya	Zee TV	
2020	Kartik Purnima	Beena	Star Bharat	
2020–2021	Kundali Bhagya	Ramona Khanna	Zee TV	
2023- 2026	Happu Ki Ultan Paltan	Rajesh Singh	And TV	

=== Crime TV series ===
Year	Show	Character	Channel	Ref
2011–2021	Crime Patrol	Meenakshi (Concealed Truth Episode 872,873) / Sudha Malik (Hisaab 750,751)	Sony TV	
2014–2018	Savdhaan India	Dr. Rohini (Episode 76) / Karuna (Episode 525) / Nakshatra Pandey (Episode 1001) / Drishti (Episode 1135) / Rajni (Episode 1497) / Lata (1831)	Life OK	

=== Films and Web series ===
Year	Title	Role	Language	Film/Web series	Notes
2018	Nirdosh	Maid Laxmi Bai	Hindi	Film	
2020	Ludo	Sambhavi	Hindi	Film	Netflix
2020	Abhay Season 2	Shalini	Hindi	Web series	ZEE5 original
2023	Virodh	Hemlata	Hindi/Haryanvi	Web series	MX Player
2023	Kafas	Priya	Hindi	Web series	SonyLIV
