= Speedunnodu =

2016 film by Bhimaneni Srinivasa Rao

- Theatrical release poster
- Directed by: Bhimaneni Srinivasa Rao
- Screenplay by: Bhimaneni Srinivasa Rao
- Story by: S. R. Prabhakaran
- Based on: Sundarapandian
- Produced by: Bheemaneni Suneetha; Bheemaneni Roshitha Sai
- Starring: Bellamkonda Sreenivas; Sonarika Bhadoria; Prakash Raj
- Cinematography: Vijay Ulaganath
- Edited by: Gautham Raju
- Music by: Sri Vasanth
- Production company: Good Will Cinema
- Release date: 5 February 2016
- Country: India
- Language: Telugu

Speedunnodu (transl. The one with the speed) is a 2016 Indian Telugu romantic action comedy film directed by Bhimaneni Srinivasa Rao. It is produced by Bheemineni Sunitha under her production company Good Will Cinema, Speedunnodu features Bellamkonda Sreenivas, Sonarika Bhadoria, and Prakash Raj in the lead roles while Kabir Duhan Singh plays the antagonist.Tamannaah performs an item song that received more marketing and exposure than the lead heroine role itself. Production commenced in April 2015, and the film's principal photography was completed by January 2016. The film released worldwide on 5 February 2016. This film is a remake of the 2012 Tamil film Sundarapandian.

== Plot ==
Sobhan is the son of the president of Rapthaadu, Veerabhadrappa, who leads a happy life and spends all his time with his friends. Sobhan ensures that he is always of some help to his friends. He goes to any extent to help his friends. He tries to help his friends woo Vasanthi, the daughter of Ramachandrappa, after she rejected his love proposal when she was in tenth. As it happens, she falls for Sobhan again by seeing his deeds to help his friend. He, too, reciprocates, but trouble comes as Vasanthi's father fixes her marriage with his relative Jagan. A murder happens, and the blame falls on Sobhan. Things get further complicated when Shobhan and Vasanthi's parents turning to be rivals.

== Cast ==
- Bellamkonda Sreenivas as Sobhan
- Sonarika Bhadoria as Vasanti
- Prakash Raj as Veerabhadrappa (Sobhan's father)
- Rao Ramesh as Ramachandrappa (Vasanti's father)
- Pavitra Lokesh as Lakshmi
- Pragathi as Vasanti's mother
- Ali as Wifi Vaikuntam
- Kabir Duhan Singh as Jagan
- Posani Krishna Murali as Krishnappa
- Pruthviraj as Sobhan's brother-in-law
- Srinivasa Reddy as Suri
- Madhunandan as Giri
- Chaitanya Krishna as Madhan
- Satya as Babu
- Jhansi as Vasanti's aunt
- Vidyullekha Raman as Vasanti's friend
- Shakalaka Shankar as Qadir
- Raghu Karumanchi
- Fish Venkat as Ramachandrappa's Henchman

Cameo appearance

- Tamannaah Bhatia in the song "Bachelor Babu"

== Production ==
The film was launched officially in April 2015. Sonarika Bhadoria was signed in as a lead actress in May 2015.

"The song is a very important factor in the film and I felt that it would be good move to have a star like Tamannaah Bhatia. The song comes when the hero and his friends are having a bachelor party right after his marriage is fixed. It would be weird if a guy dances with another girl, soon after his marriage is fixed. But here, she is telling him how he needs to be after marriage and so, we felt the concept is totally legit."

— Director Bhimaneni Srinivasa Rao about the casting and theme of the special song "Bachelor Babu".

Later in last October 2015, actress Tamannaah Bhatia was signed in to make a performance in the special song. Filming of this song was completed by mid November 2015 and it was reported that she charged half of her remuneration to appear in the movie. That song, titled "Bachelor Babu" was made on a budget of ₹2.25 crore (US$230,000). The film's title was announced as Speedunnodu in December 2015.

== Music ==
The audio of the movie was released on 22 January 2016.

No.	Title	Lyrics	Singer(s)	Length
1.	"Aatakundhoy (Bachelor Babu)"	Chandrabose	L. V. Revanth, Sravana Bhargavi	04:38
2.	"Ye Sunami Aina"	Sri Mani	L. V. Revanth	03:52
3.	"Gurrani Cheruvu Daaka"	Ananta Sriram	Anudeep Dev, Damini	03:41
4.	"Yellow Yellow Dirty Fellow"	Chandrabose	Rahul Sipligunj	01:30
5.	"Ammayini Abbayi Choodagane"	Chandrabose	L. V. Revanth	02:31
6.	"Hollywood Hero Lekka"	Karunakar Adigarla	Simha, Geetha Madhuri	03:34
7.	"Rekkalatho Chukkalakegira"	Sri Mani	L. V. Revanth, Ramya Behara	04:12
8.	"Kasai Katthi Padunu"	Sirivennela Seetharama Sastry	L. V. Revanth	01:21

== Release ==
In January 2016, Sreenivas announced the film's release date as 5 February 2016 in a press meet.

== Reception ==
The film received mixed critical response
