= Dastaan-E-Mohabbat Salim Anarkali =

Indian historical television series

- Also known as: Salim Anarkali
- Genre: Historical; Romance
- Screenplay by: Shrinita Bhaumik; Manish Palival; Anjum Abbas
- Story by: Mitali; Arundhati Sharma
- Directed by: K Mohit Kumar; Amit Gupta; Dinesh Mahadev
- Starring: See below
- Theme music composer: Sandeep Mukherjee
- Country of origin: India
- Original language: Hindi
- No. of seasons: 1
- No. of episodes: 69

Production
- Producers: Resham Sinha; Hitesh Thakkar
- Editors: Satya Sharma; Virendra Sharma
- Running time: 20 minutes

Original release
- Network: Colors TV
- Release: 1 October 2018 – 4 January 2019

Dastaan-E-Mohabbat: Salim Anarkali (transl. Story Of Love: Salim Anarkali) is an Indian historical television series that aired on Colors TV. Created by Ludhiana Pathak's Writer's Galaxy Studios, it premiered on 1 October 2018. Starring Shaheer Sheikh and Sonarika Bhadoria, the show explores the historical love story of Prince Salim and Anarkali.

== Plot ==
Prince Salim (Uzair Bassar) visits an old dargah with his father Akbar (Shahbaz Khan) and mother Jodha Bai (Gurdeep Kohli). The Saint blesses them and foretells that Salim will be a great warrior with the capability of becoming a great king, and that one day Salim will turn against Akbar. Akbar promises that he will never allow such things to happen.

When dacoits attack the village of Agra, a girl named Saifu (Naisa Khanna) and her aunt Jhillan (Shruti Ulfat) save Salim as they flee. On learning that Saifu saved Salim's life, Akbar renames Saifu as Anarkali, which means 'blossomed pomegranate'. The seer also foretold that Anarkali will be the reason of the feud between Akbar and Salim. As they return to Agra, Salim and Anarkali become best friends. While Jodha and Akbar are happy to see Salim with his new-found friend, Akbar's first wife, Ruqaiya, (Tasneem Sheikh) and Akbar's mother Hamida (Aruna Irani) are enraged to see the niece of a servant playing with Salim. When Ruqaiya plots to kill Salim, Anarkali saves him once more.

Later, after Salim begins misbehaving when Ruqaiya puts rohypnol in his milk, Akbar decides to send him to the battlefield for 12 years until he is grown-up. Salim leaves the castle and is angry with his father's decision. However, Anarkali tearfully bids adieu to Salim and decides to write him letters throughout the 12 years in which all of this takes place.

=== 12 Years Later ===
Prince Salim (Shaheer Sheikh) is now grown up and he is a brave and talented warrior who can single-handedly kill ten soldiers. Though ferocious, Salim has the soft heart of Jodha, and knows how to forgive. Salim's best friend is the Hindu warrior, Mahabbat (Meherzan Mazda), with whom Salim shares all his secrets. Anarkali (Sonarika Bhadoria), who is also grown-up, is a shy, soft-spoken, beautiful servant of Agra palace, and extremely close to Jodha. She writes letters to Salim every week, although she never gets a reply from him.

Though Anarkali loves Salim, she never expresses her desires. She knows that as a servant, she can never even dream of becoming the queen of Salim's heart. Although Ruqaiya hates Anarkali and frequently tries to defame her, Anarkali has nothing harsh against anyone. Jodha receives the news of Salim's homecoming and requests Anarkali to decorate Salim's room.

Salim returns and after meeting Jodha, he expresses his desire to meet Anarkali. Salim meets Anarkali at the terrace and is absolutely smitten with her. Although Anarkali is reluctant to see Salim again, Salim insists upon meeting her. This gives Ruqaiya an opportunity to make Anarkali fall in Salim's eyes. The next day, Ruqaiya orders Anarkali to dance with another dancer at a party arranged to celebrate Salim's homecoming. Salim is absolutely furious to see Anarkali as a rakkasha (courtesan) and slaps her in front of everyone. Salim leaves, followed by Mahabbat.

However, Mahabbat succeeds in making Salim understand that he was always in love with Anarkali. Salim decides to confess his feelings to Anarkali, who then requests that Salim leaves her alone, fearing that her worst nightmare will come true. A stubborn Salim tries to win over Anarkali and is successful. At last, Salim decides to give up, but before he does, he decides to make Anarkali confess her true feelings for him. He orders Mahabbat to arrange a party in the jungle, and to order Anarkali to come with them. Salim also arranges a dancer named Firdous to make Anarkali jealous. While Firdous dances, Salim notices Anarkali's jealousy, but she still remains silent.

Salim orders everyone to get out of the tent except Anarkali. Salim asks her why she was still silent. Anarkali replies that she is just a servant and cannot tell Salim what to do and what not. A frustrated Salim decides to make the tent catch fire and kill himself. However, this incident makes Anarkali weak, and she confesses her love for him. Hamida, after receiving the news of the fire incident, decides to meet Salim but is stunned to see him hugging Anarkali. She learns of their affair and decides to end it. Firdous, as revealed is a plot planted by Ruqaiya, tells her about Salim's love for Anarkali.

Ruqaiya asks Firdous to create a rift between them, but Firdous refuses and says she will not come between the two lovers. Ruqaiya kills Firdous. Akbar calls Nigris Jaan to teach dance to Anarkali. Firstly, Nigris behaves rudely with Anarkali but later, when she realises her love for Salim, she starts helping her. Then, Maan Bai, Salim's cousin enters and is successful in marrying him. She becomes Salim's first wife and starts creating the rift between Salim and Anarkali, but is unsuccessful. She even tries to kill Anarkali but Anarkali is saved by Salim. Maan Bai tells Akbar about their affair; he becomes furious and tells Anarkali to go away from Salim if she wants to save her life. But, later she is stabbed in her stomach and dies in the arms of Salim.

== Cast ==
=== Main ===
- Shaheer Sheikh as Jahangir/Prince Salim
  - Uzair Basar as Young Jahangir/Salim
- Sonarika Bhadoria as Anarkali
  - Naisa Khanna as Young Anarkali "Saifu"

=== Recurring ===
- Heli Daruwala as Shah Begum "Maan Bai"
- Gurdeep Kohli Punj as Mariam-uz-Zamani "Jodha Bai"
- Shahbaz Khan as Akbar
- Tasneem Sheikh as Ruqaiya Sultan Begum
- Parvati Sehgal as Salima Sultan Begum
- Aruna Irani as Hamida Banu Begum
- Shruti Ulfat as Jhillan
- Piyush Sahdev as Abul Fazl
- Meherzan Mazda as Mahabbat
- Karan Sharma as Man Singh I
- Hemant Choudhary as Bhagwant Das
- Rachana Mistry as Husna
- Anand Goradia as Khanam
- Ankita Srivastava as Firdaus
- Sayantani Ghosh as Nargis Jaan
- Chirag Jani as Hakim Mirza
- Riya Shukla

== International broadcast ==
- In Indonesia (Indonesian), it began airing on ANTV with the title Salim Anarkali from 11 March 2019 to 11 April 2019.
