= Prithvi Vallabh (TV series) =

Indian historical television series

- Genre: historical drama
- Based on: Prithivivallabh by Kanaiyalal Munshi
- Written by: Anirudh Pathak; Manoj Sinha; Ashutosh Kumar; Sweta Mishra
- Directed by: Maqbool Khan and Animesh Verma
- Starring: Ashish Sharma; Sonarika Bhadoria see below
- Country of origin: India
- Original language: Hindi
- No. of seasons: 1
- No. of episodes: 45

Production
- Producer: Anirudh Pathak
- Cinematography: Arvind Singh
- Production company: Writer's Galaxy

Original release
- Network: Sony Entertainment Television
- Release: 20 January – 17 June 2018

Prithvi Vallabh – Itihaas Bhi, Rahasya Bhi (transl. Prithvi Vallabh – History Too, Mystery Too) is a 2018 Indian Hindi historical television series that aired on the weekends on Sony TV.

The show is produced by Aniruddh Pathak and the production company Writer's Galaxy. Based on historical kings of Middle kingdoms of India, the story takes inspiration from Prithivivallabh, a Gujarati historical fiction by Kanaiyalal Maneklal Munshi. The show is the first production of Sony Pictures Networks India's sub-branch, SET Originals. It premiered on 20 January 2018.

The show follows the stories of the prince of Malwa, Prithvi Vallabh and the princess of Manyakhet, Mrinalvati and how their never-supposed-to-be love story unfolds.

== Plot ==
Mrinalvati (Mrinal) is the Princess of the Manyakhet Kingdom and her younger brother Tailap is the King of Manyakhet, who are advised by Guru Vinayaditya. Due to the treachery of King Singhdant of the Malwa Kingdom, which killed the entire royal family except Mrinal and Tailap, Mrinal has dedicated her life to getting revenge against Singhdant. She sends some African mercenaries to attack Malwa, but they are stopped by Prithvi Vallabh (Munj), the adopted son of Singhdant and the Yuvraj of Malwa.

After a successful alliance with the King of Devgiri, Bhilam, Mrinal decides to secretly attack Malwa with foreign explosives and also kill Singhdant during the anticipated Rang-Utsav of Malwa. There she meets Prithvi, who immediately falls in love with her and uses him to get to Singhdant. Their plan is successful, but she is not able to kill Singhdant. Prithvi follows Mrinal and throws his sword at her, but she escapes. There is huge loss of life and property in Malwa and because of this, Prithvi is banished from the Kingdom.

He goes to the place where Singhdant had found him in order to know the truth about his birth. An old lady informs Prithvi that she had found him in the forest and when she shouted whose child that was, the legendary Gajakesari appeared. Meanwhile, Tailap is in love with a courtesan named Kosha, because of which, his wife, the Queen of Manyakhet, Jakkala gets very jealous. Mrinal fixes the marriage of Bhilam-Raj's daughter, Vilas with Tailap's son, Prince Satyashray.

Mrinal asks Tailap to attack Malwa as it is in a weak state. In the battle, the son of Singhant, Yuvraj Sindhuraj is about to lose against Tailap, but the Commander of Malwa, Kallari, and Prithvi come to his aid. Malwa wins the battle. War prisoner Tailap is released by Prithvi, whom Singhdant has made the new King of Malwa. Mrinal is unable to bear this humiliation and goes to Africa and hires a very strong army including giants. Meanwhile, Prithvi invites Sindhu's son, Prince Bhoj back from his Gurukul in order to participate in the next battle.

The battle starts as Mrinal refuses to accept peace. Prithvi and his men are successful in killing all the giants and major part of Manyakhet's army during the night. The next day, Prithvi and Mrinal engage in a duel in which Prithvi beats Mrinal and takes her as Malwa's hostage. In Malwa, Mrinal again tries to kill Singhdant, but is unsuccessful. Mahakay and Sindhu, along with Mulraj, plot to have Mrinal kidnapped when she would be taken to the prison. Prithvi decides to do something in order to change Mrinal's heart. Thus, he kidnaps her with the assistance of Daku Dharti Singh.

During the kidnapping, Prithvi cuts Mulraj's hand. News reach Mahakay and he asks Mulraj to kill Mrinal and put the blame on Prithvi, but Mrinal and Prithvi both escape. They again meet that old lady who gives them shelter in the forest where Prithvi saves Mrinal from a snake. By looking at his bravery and kindness, Mrinal falls in love with Prithvi. Prithvi believing Mrinal, takes her to princess Amrusha and thereafter a new friendship between Amrusha and Mrinal begins. Leaving Mrinal to Amrusha, Prithvi sets out to Malwa to convey the good news to his father. On his way, he learns that Kalari had been captured and sets out to free him. Mrinal, on the other hand, reveals to Sulochana that it was all her plan to kill Singhdant by trapping Prithvi. Meanwhile, Sindhu, led astray by Mahakay, decides to invite Mrinal to Malwa in Prithvi's absence and succeeds in his mission. The same night, he kills Singhdant and blames Mrinal for the same. Rajmata Vatra, believing the same, orders to arrest both Prithvi and Mrinal, after which both are imprisoned. During the funeral for Singhdant, Sindhuraj is made the next king of Malwa after which he insults Mrinal and sentences her to death.

When Sindhu is about to light the funeral pyre, Rajmata asks him to stop and asks Prithvi to do the same. Later she reveals the actual truth of Singhdant's murder, shocking everyone. Prithvi gets his post back and saves Mrinal from execution and takes her to Malwa as she falls unconscious. Tailap, on the other hand, knowing about his sister's state sets out to free her with the help of the neighbouring kingdoms. Later, Prithvi forgives Sindhu and refuses to punish him for his crime. Tailap reaches Malwa where he is welcomed by Prithvi to his surprise with the proposal of peace and friendship and takes him to Mrinal. She wakes up recalling the insult to her and refuses to accept Prithvi's proposal of peace and, in anger, slaps Prithvi. As she is about to leave, Amrusha intervenes and try to persuade Mrinal, but in vain. Meanwhile, Prince Satyashraya returns from his Gurukul and is introduced to his would-be wife Vilas, after which he tortures her emotionally.

Back at Malwa, Sindhu tries to kill himself, but is saved by Prithvi after which everyone forgives him. Mrinal, on the other undergoes emotional trauma thinking about Sindhu's insulting words, but is comforted by Guru Aditya. After this, Prithvi goes to meet Van Amma to learn the secret of his birth and identity who advises him to go to Mrinal to know the truth of Gajakesari. Everyone refuses to let Prithvi go to Manyaket, but he is stubborn and so left with no other option, Rajmata tells that she would let Prithvi go if Kalari gives permission. Kalari challenges Prithvi to a duel if he wants his permission. Satyashraya tortures Vilas again, but this time is caught by Sulochana who promises Vilas that she would not reveal the truth to Mrinal until she wishes to. The very next day, he tries to misbehave with Vilas for which he is brutally punished by Mrinal and is made to apologise to Vilas and her family. Prithvi defeats Kalari in the duel and sets off to Manyakhet and is accompanied by Bhoj and Rasiniti. Back in Manyakhet, Vikramjeet, the brother of Bhilam Raj, makes his entry. Prithvi, on reaching Manyakhet, proposes marriage to Mrinal, shocking everyone and is insulted by Mrinal again. After this incident, Prithvi stays in Manyaket. It is then that Bhoj meets Vilas, who had actually come to meet Prithvi, and is instantly drawn to her. That very day, Mrinal comes to meet Prithvi in his tent and puts forward the condition of beheading his family members in exchange for her marriage with him. Prithvi, undeterred by her words, asks her permission to stay until Diwali to which she agrees and also invites him for dinner at the palace.

On the night of royal dinner Satyashray poisons food which affects Bhoj, but saved by Sulochana's timely intervention. Manyakhet asks for forgiveness from Prithvi and Mrinal asks what she can do to restore trust, for which Prithvi asks permission to build a statue. Meanwhile Vilas comes to see Bhoj with Jakkala and Laxmi. They develop close friendship. Prithvi sends Rasnidhi and Bhoj back because he don't want them to get harmed further.

On the eve of Diwali the statue is unveiled in front of public, which shows Mrinal and Prithvi together. This offends Mrinal to warrant Prithvi's arrest, later in court furious King Tailabh awards death sentence to Prithvi. Meanwhile Kosha is pregnant from Tailabh and is on the run with Mosi for her life. She hides in Prithvi's camp and eventually Prithvi finds out. He gives her a separate guest tent to live comfortably, and inspires her to ask for her rights. Kosha breaks into royal court and is given place to stay in palace as she is pregnant on Mrinal's order. This does not sit well with Jakkala and Satyashray and their resentment and hatred for Mrinal deepens.

Before executing Prithvi publicly, Tailabh asks for his last wish to which Prithvi replies he wants to be dead by Mrinal's hands. According to which next day Mrinal goes forward to put rope around his neck, but realises that this might be last she will see of Prithvi. Seeing her in emotional turmoil, Prithvi unconsciously pulls her and kisses her. Emotional Mrinal kisses back for split second but soon realises the situation and stabs him with Sulochana's sword.

The kiss sprouts all kinds of reaction in Manyakhet's ordinary people since all witnessed what happened. On one hand who wanted to see Prithvi and Mrinal together (Sulochana and Vilas) are upset seeing Mrinal's state of shock and anger. Vikramjeet takes advantage of this and manipulates Tailabh into berefting Mrinal of all the important Political and Social posts. Slowly he gains hold of Mrinal's Post by helping to win the war against Chola kingdom.

Meanwhile after getting stabbed Prithvi falls down and before anyone could react, he is saved by HimRaj. It is revealed that HimRaj is Organiser of GajKesari sect and is here to save Prithvi because it's their responsibility to look after wellbeing of GajKesari of that time. He warns Guru Vinayaditya, Tailabh and Mrinal that killing GajKesari will bring curse upon Manyakhet kingdom.

Slowly Prithvi is brought back to life and left to heal as he is still unconscious. Slowly Prithvi gets his conscience back and Mrinal begins to torture him with new tricks every time without killing him. She is furious with Prithvi's action and empties all of her hatred over him. Prithvi accepte this without saying a word. For final blow she puts him into Bazar crossroads and provoke people to stone him as he is the son of King Singhdant of Malwa who killed her King Father and Queen mother. Mrinal is shunned by everyone who she holds dear and near slowly making her realise that hating Prithvi is no use when her own people don't respect her. Queen Jakkala brings forth the final nail calling her state is worse than Kosha the prostitute. This hurts Mrinal to the core, and she decides to leave the Kingdom forever.

Meanwhile Bhoj comes to find out about Prithvi in garb of common man and bumps into Vilas. Vilas is happy to see him, promises to help him. After knowing about Mrinal's decision with help of Bhoj's advice she calls Guru Vinayaditya to stop her from leaving as she listens to only him. This further makes Jakkala resent Mrinal more and Satyashray and Vikramjeet to plot Prithvi's murder by poisoning his medicines.

Guru Vinayaditya visits Prithvi's chamber and Prithvi is given idea of what his actions did to Mrinal. He is deeply saddened as this wasn't his motive at all. He asks forgiveness of Mrinal and is told by her that a Woman's Pride is not so much delicate thing that could be broken by mere touch of a man. Her reply makes him admire her more and when he is put into Bazzar tells people it was his fault alone, not Mrinal's, unknown that Mrinal is listening to him.

Vilas hears Vikramjeet and Satyashray plotting and rushes to tell Mrinal but is stabbed by Vikramjeet- her own uncle. Still she manages to reach Mrinal and tells her to stop Killing of Prithvi as he is the only one who loves her. Seeing Vilas into pain and suffering and still caring for her Mrinal blurts out that she also loves Prithvi and she won't let anything happen to him or Vials, both. Leaving her into care of Sulochana's associates she runs for his chamber only to find HimRaj and Guru Vinayaditya already there. HimRaj calls out Vikramjeet and all other kings of whole India for their small mindsets and tells about GajKesari's Legend.

It is revealed that GajKesari is Living Legend who births as human to save whole Bharat (Indian subcontinent) from outer evil forces with help of all the king's of India. Also, Mrinal's father, King Shivdutt, was GajKesari of his time. The war that GajKesari wins is to protect the Golden Sparrow which keeps the whole Indian Subcontinent spiritually and economically empowered. The enemy is Subukabdin Gajhni who wants that sparrow for himself and was defeated by King Shivdutt 30 years ago. Legend also tells that Sparrow has to be saved by GajKesari as only he has those special powers and will be left vulnerable after war and completion of his task. Which is why Singhdant took opportunity to kill him, and later changed his way to peace in wake of repentance.

Eventually All kings are called into Manyakhet and decide to meet with their respective forces into Vindhya mountain range for Grand Battle. Mrinal is chosen by Prithvi as Chief Commander of whole Indian collective army, HimRaj supporting this as she is daughter of former GajKesari. This upsets Vikramjeet and few King's male ego. Later in Malwa's camp, Mrinal confess to Prithvi and asks for forgiveness. He is happy to have her with him. Prithvi leaves for malva and Mrinal prepares to leave for Vindhya with her army. Meanwhile Vikramjeet plots with Tailabh to attack Malwa behind Prithvi's back so they can bring it down once for all. While Prithvi and Mrinal are battling in Kabul they attack on Malva and Kallari is badly injured. Tailabh and Vikramjeet runs like cowards back to Manyakhet. Kallari wants to see Prithvi before death, and Vazda sends Bhoj to Prithvi with urgent call. While Manyakhet attacks Maalva, Mrinal meets Prithvi and both leave with whole army to Kabul. Kabul's King Jaypal asks his son to find GajKesari and bring him into Kabul. He finds them in midway to Kabul and tells them that Subukabdin Gajhni has laid siege to Kabul Palace. Only plus point is Subuk's two sons wants throne for themselves. Prithvi has to leave for Kabul with few choice warriors as there is Blizzard making their progress slow. Asking Guru Vinayaditya to bring whole army later he goes further to inspect to what can be done to win the war.

Once reaching the Gajhni camp, they infiltrate the camp, but Mrinal is captured; day is saved as she pretends to local liquor supplier. Gajhni wants her for himself and takes her to his tent. To save Mrinal, Prithvi kidnaps one of Gajhni's son and reaches to palace through secret tunnel. The news break-out and search begins to find Ismael. Eventually with different twist and turns Mrinal is rescued and brought back to palace. There, Prithvi shows her the Golden Sparrow and puts it back into ground with all of his powers. Once done, he is left weak, and brought back to their camp, as army has reached. Once in camp, Kings bribed by Vikram try to kill Prithvi in sleep but are slaughtered by Mrinal. Eventually, Gajhni is killed, and Mahmood goes back his land, never to return. Bhoj reaches to Kabul just as Prithvi is about to leave for Malva, and is told what happened after he left for Kabool. Once reaching, he meets Kallari and Kallari dies into his arms. In Manyakhet, Mrinal confronts Tailap about invasion on Malva but has to keep quiet in front of Vikramjeet's logics as she and Prithvi are not yet out into open.

Prithvi comes to Manyakhet, to complete wishes of his both late father's, King Singhdant and Guru Kallari to finish enmity between two kingdoms, forever. Vikramjeet provokes him but Prithvi shows his real face to royal family and puts forth marriage proposal for Mrinal to end the war. Satyashray wants to continue the war, Tailap is as usual indecisive but Queen Jakkala opposes this war mindset. Agreeing with Jakkala, Mrinal asks Prithvi if he would marry her. Prithvi replies by filling her hair parting (maang) with vermillon (sindoor).

== Cast ==
- Ashish Sharma as Prithvi Vallabh (Vakpati Munjraj) / Dhaku Dharti Singh / Gajj Kesari / Munj, King of Malwa
- Sonarika Bhadoria as Warrior Princess Mrinalvati (Mrinal), King Tailap's Elder Sister, the greatest Warrior of Manyakhet, legendary Regent of Manyakhet
- Mukesh Rishi as Sena Adhyaksh Kallari, Chief of Malwa's Army, King Prithvi's teacher, mentor and his godfather
- Sheezan Khan as Yuvraj Bhoj, Crown Prince of Malwa, King Prithvi's beloved Nephew, Son of Prince Sindhuraja
- Ashnoor Kaur as Rajkumari Vilasvati (Vilas)-Princess of Devgiri.
- Seema Biswas as Vandevi, Mentor and Mother-like Friend of King Prithvi, Tribal Lady who first found Prithvi in the forest, identified him as Gajj Kesari, prophesied his greatness and handed his responsibility to King Singhdant and Kallari
- Sunil Kumar Palwal as Sindhuraj, Prince of Malwa, King Prithvi's younger brother, Crown Prince Bhoj's father
- Shalini Kapoor as Rajmata Vazda, Mother of King Prithvi Vallabh, Malwa's Queen Mother
- Pawan Chopra as Raja Singhdant, King Prithvi and Prince Sindhuraja's father, former King of Malwa
- Ankush Bali as Rasnidhi, Court Poet of Malwa, Close Friend of King Prithvi
- Alefia Kapadia as Princess Savitri, Prince Sindhuraj's wife, Mother of Crown Prince Bhoj
- Jitin Gulati as Tailapraj, King of Manyakhet, Princess Mrinalvati's younger brother
- Swati Rajput as Sulochana, one of the greatest warriors in the history of Manyakhet, Chief of Princess Mrinal's personal Army and Spies, closest and most trusted ally of Princess Mrinal
- Surendra Pal as Guru Vinayaditya, Princess Mrinal and King Tailap's Mentor and Foster Father
- Piyali Munshi as Maharani Jakkala, Queen of Manyakhet, Mother of Crown Prince Satyashraya, Sister of Queen Lakshmi of Devgiri
- Divyangana Jain as Kosha, King Tailap's Mistress
- Yunus Khan as Rajkumar Satyashraya, Crown Prince of Manyakhet
- Vizin sharma as Bilal Friend of satyashraya
- Shweta Dadhich as Mausi, Kosha's Aunt and Foster Mother
- Narendra Jha as Deceased King of Manyakhet, Father of Princess Mrinal and King Tailap (Cameo)
- Gurdeep Kohli as Ujjwala, Deceased Queen of Manyakhet, Princess Mrinal and King Tailap's Mother (Cameo)
- Ishita Ganguly as Rajkumari Amrusha, Princess of Ujjain, King Prithvi's childhood best friend.
- Geetanjali Mishra as Rani Lakshmi-Queen of Devgiri, younger Sister of Manyakhet's Queen Jakkala.
- Yashodhan Rana as Him Raj.
- Ankit Arora as Vikramjeet-Brother of Devgiri's King, Prime Minister of Manyakhet.
- Puja Banerjee as Vikramjeet’s wife.
- Kiran Kumar as Sultan Sabuktigin of Ghazni
- Tushar Chawla as Ismail of Ghazni
- Rakshit Pant as Mahmud of Ghazni

== International broadcast ==
In Sri Lanka, it airs on TV Derana, dubbed into Sinhala and titled as Pruthivi Maharaja. It is dubbed into Tamil and titled as Kadhal Mannan Prithvi and it airs on Sun Life from 5 August 2019. It was broadcast in thailand on Channel 8 (Thailand), Myanmar on 5Plus
