= Archana Taide =

Indian actress

- Occupations: Actress, Television Producer, Writer
- Years active: 2008–present
- Spouse: Ashish Sharma (m. 2013)

Archana Taide Sharma is an Indian actress. She started her career with the reality show Bollywood Ka Ticket on 9X TV. She started her writing career with the show she herself produced along with Ashish Sharma and a close friend, titled Chore Tera Gaon Bada Pyara. She is the Creative Head as a Producer at Desi Fillum Compani Pvt. Ltd.

== Career ==
Archana played the lead role of Pavni in the show Beend Banoongaa Ghodi Chadhunga on Imagine TV. She was cast as Nikhat Ahmed Khan in Zee TV's Qubool Hai. She was last seen playing the antagonist on & TV show Santoshi Maa.

== Personal life ==
Taide was born to Anand Taide and Kiran Taide. She attended Our Lady of Good Counsel High School, Sion, Mumbai. On 30 January 2013, she married actor Ashish Sharma in Jaipur. The couple were introduced to each other by a mutual friend in Baroda where they were shooting for separate shows.

== Television ==
Year	Title	Role
2008	Kaun Jeetega Bollywood Ka Ticket	Contestant
2009	Maat Pitaah Ke Charnon Mein Swarg	Suhani
2010	Maan Rahe Tera Pitaah	Anmol
2011–2012	Beend Banoongaa Ghodi Chadhunga	Panvi
2012	Adaalat	Geeta
2012–2014	Qubool Hai	Nikhat Ahmed Khan/ Nikhat Farhan Qureshi/ Khushbu
2014	Jhalak Dikhhla Jaa 7	Herself / Guest
2016–2017	Santoshi Maa	Fake Santoshi/Sindoori
