= Chakravarti Samrat Prithviraj Chauhan =

Indian television historical drama series

- Genre: Historical drama
- Created by: Abhimanyu Singh
- Starring: Priyanshi Yadav; Samarthya Gupta; Avinesh Rekhi; Vikramjeet Virk; Ashutosh Rana; Anuja Sathe; Krissann Barretto; Akshay Anand; Namit Shah; Dinesh Mehta
- Country of origin: India
- Original language: Hindi
- No. of seasons: 1
- No. of episodes: 88

Production
- Producer: Abhimanyu Singh
- Camera setup: Multi-camera
- Running time: 20 minutes
- Production company: Contiloe Pictures

Original release
- Network: Sony Entertainment Television
- Release: 4 June – 3 October 2025

Chakravarti Samrat Prithviraj Chauhan is an Indian television historical drama series which aired on 4 June 2025 to 3 October 2025 on Sony Entertainment Television and streams digitally on SonyLIV. Produced by Contiloe Pictures and starring Priyanshi Yadav, and Samarthya Gupta.

== Cast ==
=== Main ===
- Samarthya Gupta as Prithviraj Chauhan
  - Urva Savaliya as young Prithviraj Chauhan
- Priyanshi Yadav as Rani Sanyogita
  - Riddhi Sharma / Gurnoor Kaur as young Rani Sanyogita

=== Recurring ===
- Ronit Roy as King Someshwar
- Padmini Kolhapure as Rajmata
- Avinesh Rekhi as Mahmud of Ghazni
- Vikramjeet Virk as Muhammad Ghori
- Ashutosh Rana as Chand Bardai
- Keshav Mehta as Ranveer Bhan
- Mukesh Tripathi as Shakti Singh
- Rumi Khan as King Jaichand
- Anuja Sathe as Maharani Karpura Chauhan
- Krissann Barretto as Haseena
- Akshay Anand as Jagaddeva
- Namit Shah as Chand Bardai
- Aakash Nagii as Jaalib
- Samveg Kaudan as Bheema
- Piyali Munsi as Chandralekha
- Vihaan Jaghotia as Hariraj
- Mahi Bhanushali as Ichni
- Sapna Thakur as Dassala Devi
- Viraj Kapoor as Nagarjuna
- Dinesh Mehta as Ahiravan
- Abhinav Sharma as Subahu

== Production ==
=== Casting ===
Urva Savaliya was confirmed to play young Prithviraj Chauhan. Viraj Kapoor was cast as Nagarjuna. Padmini Kolhapure playing Rajmata, and marks her return to television after 11 years. Ronit Roy joined the cast as King Someshwar. For this role, he lost 8 kilograms. Avinesh Rekhi entered the show as Mahmud of Ghazni. In August 2025, Samarthya Gupta was selected to portray elder Prithviraj Chauhan.
