= Phhir =

- Directed by: Girish Dhamija
- Produced by: Surendra Sharma; Amita Bishnoi; Bhagwanti Gabrani
- Starring: Rajneesh Duggal; Adah Sharma; Roshni Chopra
- Cinematography: Pravin Bhatt
- Music by: Raghav Sachar; Toshi-Sarib
- Distributed by: ASA Productions and Enterprises Pvt. Ltd.
- Release date: 12 August 2011
- Country: India
- Language: Hindi

Phhir (transl. Again) is an Indian Hindi-language thriller film directed by Girish Dhamija, starring Rajneesh Duggal, Adah Sharma, and Roshni Chopra. The film was produced by ASA Productions and Enterprises Pvt. Ltd. and was released on 12 August 2011.

== Plot ==
The film opens with a person (presumed to be a previous incarnation of the protagonist) who goes to a guru in Manchester, who tells him that he has to pay for his crimes in this life and the next one too. That person then goes to the cellar of a mansion called Dia Mansion, writes all that he has done in a letter, places it in a huge coffin-like box, and then shoots himself.

The next part of the film opens in the modern-day UK, where the protagonist, Dr. Kabir Malhotra (Rajneesh Duggal), is shown living happily with his wife Sia (Roshni Chopra). One day she goes missing without even a word. The worried doctor searches for her everywhere and questions everyone, including her best friend Monica Agarwal, but does not find anything, until he comes across Disha (Adah Sharma), a musician and soothsayer with special powers of premonition on touching objects who does that job for free. Initially Kabir insults her and rejects her, but later on, being convinced by inspector Asif Sheikh (Parag Tyagi) about her authentic powers, he agrees to take her help.

With Sia gone, Kabir reflects on everything in the past- how he found Sia, how he had fought with other men at bars who went near her, how they had a good time.

Soon Disha and the police find that Sia had gone with Monica and somebody else in a car somewhere, and that car is found abandoned. Kabir and Disha go to Monica's house, only to find that she has been murdered.

The case takes an interesting turn when Disha happens to visualize something about Sia, which she does not tell Kabir because of her fear that it would be too shocking for him to accept. Soon Kabir and his parents get a call that Sia has been kidnapped, and the kidnapper asks for 1 million pounds from Kabir's parents.

The kidnappers ask Kabir to come alone to deliver the money through directions given to him time and again over the phone. Kabir goes with transmitters fitted on him and the police tracking him, but these measures are rendered useless by the apparently smart criminals. Soon Kabir finds himself in a dance bar, where the bags are taken from him, but the criminals find that it is filled with only paper, and they beat him and threaten to kill his wife. Kabir chases them, only to be stopped by Disha, who arrives at the scene. She tells him that she knows where his wife is.

Disha takes Kabir and the cops to Dia Mansion, where, on searching, they come across the cellar and the coffin box. Kabir opens it to find a skeleton and a worn-out parchment. He reads all that was on it and understands that this was written by none other than himself centuries ago. Kabir had at that time been deceived by a jealous friend of his into believing that his wife was unfaithful, and he murdered his wife and kept her in the coffin box. Later on, knowing the truth, he was not able to forgive himself, so he approached a guru, who told him that he would pay for his crimes now and in the next life and told him what to do next. Kabir had then written everything and had shot himself at the cellar.

Soon the kidnappers send a disc to Kabir's family with a video of Sia being tortured as a warning not to call police, and this time Kabir is called to an isolated ship to pay up and take his wife.

On reaching the ship, Kabir goes alone, but Disha sees a gang of goons following him, senses danger, and follows him secretly.

On the deck, Kabir meets with the greatest shock of his life when he sees his wife, hale and hearty, waiting to meet him, with none other than her Englishman boyfriend, whom Kabir had once beaten in a bar for going to Sia. Apparently everything that has taken place has been an act, and both have been involved in the entire drama. Sia shoots Kabir in the shoulder. She then tells him that she and the Englishman were lovers and that her only interest in Kabir was in his father's money and property, for which she married him. She also admits that it was she who killed Monica, as the latter was involved in the crime and knew all about it. They tell Kabir that on killing him, she will put up an act of innocence before his parents, and later the property will be transferred to her. They also say they shall eliminate his parents.

As Kabir is going to be shot again, Disha breaks in and pushes the gun off Sia's hands. Kabir breaks fee and beats up all the goons. Disha is pushed off the ship and hangs on the deck margins. Kabir goes to save her, manages to pull her up, but gets stabbed by Sia's lover. Everyone fled the scene.

Sia arrives at Kabir's house and tries to convince his parents that he was killed by goons, but there comes Inspector Asif, who has come to know about everything, telling them the truth. He arrests Sia on charges of attempting to murder Kabir and on charges of murdering Monica.

Now in hospital, in a critical condition and under surgery, Kabir's soul leaves his body and meets Guru, who tells him that he has faced the punishment for his crimes in the past, but he has also saved lives as a doctor, so the circle of karma is complete, and that he shall live.

The film ends in Goa, India, where Kabir arrives as a surprise guest at the house of Disha, who has moved down to India. He says that he searched and found a picture of the past of him and his wife. His wife of the past happens to be none other than Disha herself. Disha says she knew this but was afraid to admit it as she feared falling in love again.

== Cast ==
- Rajneesh Duggal as Dr. Kabir Malhotra/Vikram Aditya
- Adah Sharma as Disha
- Roshni Chopra as Sia Malhotra
- Gurpreet Singh
- Parag Tyagi as Inspector Asif Sheikh
- Mohan Agashe

== Soundtrack ==
Phhir
- Original CD Cover

Soundtrack album by Raghav Sachar
- Released: July 2011
- Recorded: 2011
- Genre: Feature film soundtrack
- Language: Hindi
- Label: T-Series

The music of Phhir has been composed by Raghav Sachar and Sharib Sabri as well as, Toshi Sabri. It consists of six tracks.

Track listing
No.	Title	Singer(s)	Length
1.	"Yaadein"	Sharib Sabri	4:50
2.	"Satrangi Saathiya"	Toshi Sabri	4:09
3.	"Love Is All I Got"	Raghav Sachar	4:38
4.	"Karma Queen"	Sunidhi Chauhan	4:20
5.	"Gumsum"	Shreya Ghoshal	4:03
6.	"Loot"	Raghav Sachar	4:06

== Box office ==
The film met with mixed reviews. The film was declared as an "average grosser" at the box office.
