= Saansein =

2016 film directed by Rajiv S Ruia

- Theatrical release poster
- Directed by: Rajiv S Ruia
- Screenplay by: Ram Patil; Shiraz ahmad
- Produced by: Goutam Kumar Jain; Vivek Agarwal
- Starring: Rajneesh Duggal; Sonarika Bhadoria; Hiten Tejwani; Neetha Shetty
- Cinematography: Javed Ethesham
- Edited by: Shree Narayan singh
- Music by: Vivek Kar
- Production company: GPA Productions
- Distributed by: GPA Productions
- Release date: 25 November 2016
- Running time: 101 minutes
- Country: India
- Language: Hindi

Saansein (transl. Breaths) is a 2016 Indian Hindi-language romantic horror film directed by Rajiv S Ruia and produced by Goutam Kumar Jain. It stars Rajneesh Duggal, Sonarika Bhadoria, Hiten Tejwani, and Neetha Shetty. The film was released on 25 November 2016.

== Plot ==
Two men find something wrapped in a pond. One man begins unwrapping the package while the other goes to get a drink for the two. As soon as the man opens the wrapped package, smoke comes out of the mirror inside it and suffocates the man, traumatizing his friend.

Two years later, Shirin Grover (Sonarika Bhadoria) is the mysterious singer at Azalle, one of the best clubs in Mauritius, owned by her roommate Tanya (Neetha Shetty). She always leaves the club before midnight and does not let anyone come near her. One night, Ronnie (Aman Prajapat) lusts for Shirin, and he and his friends chase after her while she leaves in a taxi. They stop her taxi, but strange occurrences disturb the group, and Ronnie's friends along with the taxi driver run away. As soon as he touches Shirin, a mysterious force attacks Ronnie, and he is killed.

An Indian detective catches the case of Ronny's murder and he immediately suspects Shirin. Tanya encourages a depressed Shirin to fight for the sake of her little sister Aditi. The detective interrogates Shirin and Tanya.

While praying at a template, Shirin catches the eye of a businessman named Abhay (Rajneesh Duggal). He goes to Azalle to watch her sing and continues to follow her around. She always performs and tries to go home before midnight. He picks up a scarf that she leaves at a shop.

That night, a mysterious force attacked Abhay using the scarf. Abhay approaches Tanya to help find out more about Shirin allusiveness. He goes to Tanya and Shirin's house and watches Shirin get attacked by a mysterious force at midnight. He tells Shirin and Tanya that he is willing to fight for his love.

Abhay seeks the help of C.K. Bir (Hiten Tejwani), a medium. They discover that the spirit is from a previous life that is haunting Shirin. Her name was Simran, and she was about to marry her childhood friend Vivek. A man named Shubrat (Aamir Dalvi) came into their home during the pre-wedding celebrations. He became obsessed with Simran, who only had eyes for Vivek. Shubrat seduced Simran's younger sister Reva and manipulated her into drugging and seducing Vivek. When Simran found out, she broke up with Vivek. Shubrat stepped in to marry Simran. On their wedding night, Simran overheard Shubrat and Reva fighting. She confronted Shubrat, and in a scuffle, Shubrat hit his head on a mirror and died exactly at midnight. Soon after, one by one, all of Simran's family started to die.

C.K. Bir tells Shirin, Tanya, and Abhay that Shubrat's spirit is trapped in the mirror that killed him. They think Aditi is going to be his next victim, with Abhay going to save her just in time.

They find a mystical talisman that they will need for the exorcism and go to the house where Simran lived with her family since the exorcism must happen in the same place Shubrat died. There, Abhay runs into the man guarding the mirror, believing his friend is trapped inside.

They bring the mirror to the room where Shubrat died. During the exorcism, the spirit possesses Tanya and attacks Simran. The exorcism is successful, but they are unable to save Tanya's life.

== Cast ==
- Rajneesh Duggal as Abhay
- Sonarika Bhadoria as Shirin
- Hiten Tejwani as C.K. Bir
- Neetha Shetty as Tanya
- Sachi Ruia as Aditi
- Aamir Dalvi as Shubrat
- Aman Prajapat as Ronnie

== Soundtrack ==
No.	Title	Singer(s)	Length
1.	"Mera Ishq"	Arijit Singh, Ash King, Swati Sharma
2.	"Tum Jo Mile"	Armaan Malik
3.	"Tum Ho Mere"	Najam Bajwa
4.	"Dil Yeh Khamakha"	Dev Negi
5.	"Royi"	Shibani Sur
6.	"Dil Yeh Khamakha Revisited"	Nikhil D'Souza
7.	"Tum Jo Mile Unplug"	Amit Gupta, Pratap Dodla
8.	"TUM HO MERE Unplugged"	Rajneesh Duggal, Vivek Verma
