= Priya Wal =

Indian television actress

- Born: Priya Wal; 9 December 1983 (age 42)
- Occupations: Actress, writer
- Years active: 2004–present
- Known for: Pyaar Kii Ye Ek Kahaani; Remix

Priya Wal (born 9 December 1983) is an Indian television actress. Wal played various roles such as Anvesha in Remix on Star One and Aditi in Kahaani Ghar Ghar Kii on StarPlus. She is best known for portraying Misha Dobriyal in Star One's hit television series Pyaar Kii Ye Ek Kahaani.

== Career ==
Wal started her television career as Anvesha Banerjee (Priya Wal) in the youth-based show Remix on Star One. The character of red haired tom boy, Anvesha Banerjee fondly called 'Ashi' gave her instant fame.

After that she was a part of several TV shows such as Jeete Hain Jiske Liye as Ayesha, C.I.D. as Dr. Nyla Rajyadhakshya on Sony Entertainment Television (India), Sun Yaar Chill Maar on Bindass, "Yes Boss" as Imrati Devi and in Kahaani Ghar Ghar Kii as Aditi Aggrawal.

In 2010 and 2011, she played the role of Misha in the youth based supernatural show, Pyaar Kii Ye Ek Kahaani on Star One. She was seen as Riya Oberoi Tum Dena Saath Mera. She took a break owing to health concerns after Pyaar Kii Ye Ek Kahaani and made a comeback in 2013 with Channel [V]’s V The Serial. In the same year, she became a part of MTV Webbed, a show based on spreading awareness against cyber abuse in association with the NGO, Cyber Crime Awareness Society (CCAS).

In 2015, she appeared in a music video "O Meri Jaan" directed by Waseem Sabir to support the cause of giving a good upbringing to the girl child along with other TV celebrities. In the same year, she made a comeback to television with her role Barkha in &TV's Gangaa, but later quit the show due to health issues. Priya Wal has directed a documentary movie. She has also made a short film "Koi Kuch Karta Kyun Nahin" with Sukirti Kandpal and others. In 2016, she wrote the script of a Bangladeshi show Super Girls, a show based on glamour world and aired on GTV (Bangladesh).

She is seen in her own short web series Misadventures of a television actor on her own YouTube channel.

== Television ==
Year	Show	Role	References
2004-05	Remix	Anvesha Banerjee Ray	
2006	C.I.D.	Dr Nyla Rajyadhakshya	
2007	Jeete Hain Jiske Liye	Ayesha	
2007	Aek Chabhi Hai Padoss Mein	Riya	
2007	Lucky	Sonia	
2008	Sun Yaar Chill Maar	GG (cameo)	
2008	Yes Boss	Imrati	
2008	Kahaani Ghar Ghar Kii	Aditi	
2010-2011	Pyaar Kii Ye Ek Kahaani	Misha Dobriyal/Kabir Singh Rathore	
2011	Tum Dena Saath Mera	Riya Oberoi	
2013	V The Serial	Priya Wal	
2013	MTV Webbed	Episodic role	
2015	Box Cricket League season-1	Herself (Delhi Dragons team member)	
2016	Gangaa	Barkha	

=== Web series ===
Year	Title	Role	Reference
2017	Misadventures of a television actor	Herself	
2021	Mumbai Diaries	News editor	
2021	Glitter	Shonali Bose	

=== Filmography ===
Year	Title	Role	Reference
2017	Koi Kuch Karta Kyun Nahin (short film)	producer/director	

=== Music video(s) ===
Year	Song	Album	Singer	Reference
2015	O Meri Jaan	single	Suhail Zargar	

=== Theatre ===
Year	Title	Role	References
2010	Da dating truth		

== Awards ==
Year	Award	Category	Work	Result
2005	Indian Telly Awards	Fresh New Face (Female)	Remix	Won
2011	Kalakar Awards	Best Supporting-Actress	Pyaar Kii Ye Ek Kahaani	Won
