= My Friend Ganesha =

- Directed by: Rajiv S Ruia
- Written by: Rajiv S. Ruia
- Produced by: Manish Ruparel; Raman Trikha; Mitesh Mehta; Deepak Bhanushali; Ronak Bhagat
- Starring: Ahsaas Channa; Kiran Janjani; Shital Shah; Upasana Singh
- Cinematography: Krishna Jai Nandan
- Edited by: Avinash Walzade
- Music by: Songs: P. Sameer; Ahsan Ahmed; Nirmal–Shekhar; R. Roy; Laxmi–Vasant; Background Score: Nirmal–Shekhar
- Animation by: Radiant Animation
- Production company: Koffee Break Pictures
- Release date: 6 July 2007
- Running time: 121 minutes
- Country: India
- Language: Hindi
- Box office: ₹1.59 crore

My Friend Ganesha is a 2007 Indian Hindi-language devotional drama film written and directed by Rajiv S Ruia and produced by Deepak Bhanushali, Manish Ruparel, Raman Trikha, Mitesh Mehta, and Ronak Bhagat. It stars Ahsaas Channa, Kiran Janjani, Shital Shah and Upasana Singh.

== Plot ==
Ashu, an 8-year-old boy, feels lonely since his parents, Aditya and Aarti, don't have time for him, and he doesn't have any friends. As the story moves on, Lord 'Ganesha' becomes his friend, and together they resolve so many problems around and have a lot of fun.

Aarti and Aditya are too involved in their daily lives and hence cannot give much time to the boy, who always feels lonely. He would only get to be with the maid. On one rainy day, the boy saves a drowning mouse. He brings the small mouse home and tells the maid about it. She is very happy and tells the boy that he has saved Lord Ganesha's pet ride. Gangubai explains to him the full episode of Lord Ganesha & Mushakraj and also that he is his friend. Ashu gets sad and tells Gangubai that he is also alone and needs a friend, on which she tells him that Ganesha can be his friend. The boy gets excited at this thought. It was a period when the family was going through a crisis and was coinciding with the forthcoming Ganesha Festival. Gangubai somehow convinces everyone to bring Ganesha home for this festival. Ashu is very excited. Ganesha comes into their home, and things start turning around in their family. Ganesha becomes Ashu's friend, and together with him, they solve various problems in their family and have a lot of fun these 11 days.

== Cast ==
- Ahsaas Channa as Aashu
- Kiran Janjani as Aditya 'Adi', Aashu's father
- Shital Shah as Aarti, Aashu's mother
- Arun Bakshi as Aashu's Principal
- Mushtaq Khan as Police Inspector Patil
- Upasana Singh as Gangu Taai
- Rachit Trehan as Anwar (Assistant Bank Manager)
- Saurabh Singh as Karan, Aditi's boyfriend
- Anil Nagrath as a wicked Businessman (Aarti's boss)
- Sanatan Modi as Bank Boss (Aditya's boss)
- Aarya Vora as Aditi, Aditya's sister
- Master Vedaant Phaterpekar as Monty
- Rajan Verma as Kaaliya

== Reception ==
=== Box office ===
According to Box Office India, the film earned ₹ 1.59 crore worldwide and labelled it a "box office flop". Trade analyst Taran Adarsh wrote that "businesswise, the film could've done with a far more aggressive promotion and a better release period [ideally, it should've released during the summer vacations. Not now, when the schools have re-opened]."

=== Critical response ===
Sukanya Verma of Rediff.com gave the film 1.5 out of 5, writing, "At the end of the day, films like My Friend Ganesha just end up making one's blood boil. They aren't cute. They are certainly not clever. But kids are. And they deserve better." Anupama Chopra of India Today wrote, "This could have been a fun revenge-of-the-nerd story but director Rajiv S. Ruia makes a mess of it. The animation is tacky, the performances are laughably bad and the script is too juvenile to engage even a child. Indeed, My Friend Ganesha requires some celestial intervention itself." Taran Adarsh of IndiaFM gave the film 2.5 out of 5, praising the performances and animation but criticising writing by calling it "half-baked" and the only "sore point" in the film.

== Sequels ==
A sequel My Friend Ganesha 2 was released on 22 August 2008. Upasana Singh reprised her role while Ali Haji, Harsh Chhaya, Bhairavi Goswami, Suhasini Mulay, Sulbha Deshpande played new characters. The film earned ₹400,000 worldwide.

A third film in the series My Friend Ganesha 3 starring Rahul Pendkalkar, Baba Sehgal, Eva Grover, Sayaji Shinde, Himani Shivpuri, and Makarand Anaspure, was released on 26 March 2010. The film earned ₹230,000 worldwide.

A fourth film, My Friend Ganesha 4 was released digitally in 2020. The film stars Anup Soni, Anant Jog, Ashwini Kalsekar, Rishabh Jain, Hansika Singh, Roshni Walia, Parth Mehta, and Vishesh Kaul.
