= Namit Shah =

Indian actor (born 2001)

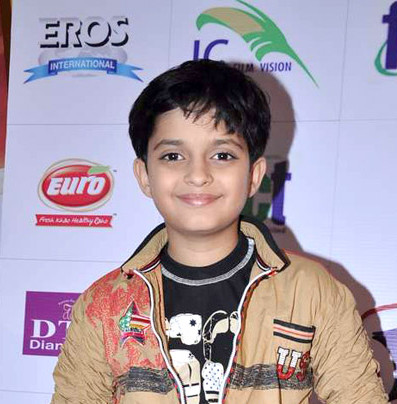
- Shah in 2013, promoting his film Main Krishna Hoon
- Born: 21 October 2001 (age 24); Mumbai, Maharashtra, India
- Other name: Tumkee
- Education: Mithibai College, Mumbai
- Occupation: Actor
- Years active: 2006–present
- Known for: The Suite Life of Karan & Kabir; Main Krishna Hoon; Wagle Ki Duniya – Nayi Peedhi Naye Kissey

Namit Shah (born 21 October 2001) is an Indian actor who works in Hindi-language films and television series. He is known for his role as Kabir in The Suite Life of Karan & Kabir and Vivaan Malhotra in sitcom Wagle Ki Duniya – Nayi Peedhi Naye Kissey.

== Career ==
Shah started his career with an HSBC commercial in 2009, which was not aired in India. Since then, he starred in many television commercials. He was also featured in a Reebok advertisement alongside the former Indian national cricket team captain, Mahendra Singh Dhoni. He has done various small roles for soap operas.

In 2012, Shah received the role of Kabir Jaiswal, in Disney India's popular television series, The Suite Life of Karan & Kabir. A smart, quiet and mature boy of 10–11 years, his character indulged himself in mischievous acts with his twin brother, Karan (played by Siddharth Thakkar). He was cast in the role for two seasons of the show. In 2013, Shah made his silver screen debut with the film Main Krishna Hoon, alongside veteran actors like Juhi Chawla and Paresh Ganatra. He played Krishna, an orphaned boy who was assisted by Lord Krishna himself. He played the role of Vivaan in Wagle Ki Duniya - Nayi Peedhi Naye Kissey. He also played the role of Chand Bardai in Chakravarti Samrat Prithviraj Chauhan in 2025.

== Filmography ==
=== Films ===
| Year | Title | Role | Notes |
|---|---|---|---|
| 2010 | Break Ke Baad | Young Abhay | |
| 2013 | Main Krishna Hoon | Krishna | Nominated for Times Best Child Artist Award |
| 2013 | Ramaiya Vastavaiya | Young Raghuveer | |
| 2014 | Hasee Toh Phasee | Young Nikhil Bharadwaj | |
| 2014 | Raja Natwarlal | Vicky | |

=== Television ===
| Year | Title | Role | Notes |
|---|---|---|---|
| 2009 | Jeet Jayenge Hum | Shankar | |
| 2009 | Sapna Babul Ka...Bidaai | | |
| 2009 | Mata Ki Chowki | | |
| 2009 | Mitwa Phool Kamal Ke | | |
| 2012–2013 | The Suite Life of Karan & Kabir | Kabir Jaiswal | Character equivalent of Cody Martin, portrayed by Cole Sprouse in the original series, The Suite Life of Zack & Cody. |
| 2014 | Baal Veer | Jai Veer | |
| 2015 | Goldie Ahuja Matric Pass | Harry Ahuja | |
| 2019 | Khoob Ladi Mardaani...Jhansi Ki Rani | Nana Saheb | |
| 2021–2025 | Wagle Ki Duniya - Nayi Peedhi Naye Kissey | Vivaan Malhotra | |
| 2025 | Chakravarti Samrat Prithviraj Chauhan | Chand Bardai | |

== See also ==
- List of Indian film actors
