= Zindagi 50-50 =

2013 film by Rajiv S Ruia

Zindagi 50–50
- Poster
- Directed by: Rajiv S Ruia
- Screenplay by: S Machinery
- Story by: Rajiv S Ruia
- Produced by: Veeraj Kumar; Rajiv S Ruia
- Starring: Veena Malik; Riya Sen; Rajan Verma; Arya Babbar; Supriya Kumari; Rajpal Yadav; Swati Aggarwal; Murli Sharma; Atul Parchure; ABC
- Cinematography: Mukesh Maru
- Edited by: Satish Patil
- Music by: Vivek Kar; Amjad Nadeem
- Production companies: Ram Gopal Productions, Spotlight International Film
- Release date: 24 May 2013
- Running time: 130 minutes
- Country: India
- Language: Hindi
- Budget: ₹45 million (US$470,000)
- Box office: ₹110 million (US$1.1 million)

Zindagi 50–50 (transl. Life 50–50) is a 2013 Indian Hindi erotic film directed by Rajiv S Ruia. It stars Veena Malik, Rajan Verma, Supriya Kumari, Arya Babbar, Riya Sen and Rajpal Yadav. This film dubbed is in Tamil titled Mutham Thara Vaa and in Telugu as Rangeela.

== Plot ==
Zindagi 50-50 revolves around three different stories. Zindagi means life. Sometimes it's fun, and sometimes it's a curse, but it's just a point of view. People pray to God for happiness so that they can enjoy their lives. But God says that he had already given a life to them, to enjoy all the happiness. It has been said that the way you ask questions about your life, it answers you in the same manner.

"Zindagi 50:50" is the same story of such questions and answers: it's a story of Rupa (a housewife), Madhuri (a prostitute), and Naina (a struggling actress). Rupa's husband, Birju (an auto driver), has a dream of getting a house. To fulfill his dream, Rupa breaks all the limits of her life. To complete her dream of house, CR Lele (a government servant) pushes her in a dark side of her life, where she gets the house, but also gets a smirch on her respect.

Zindagi 50:50 is a story of the special dreams of a common man. And to fulfill those dreams, he has to struggle a lot, but sometimes they get it easily, and sometimes he has to lose everything. "Zindagi 50:50" has this same feeling of losing and getting.

== Cast ==
- Veena Malik – Madhuri
- Riya Sen – Naina
- Rajan Verma – Birju
- Arya Babbar – Addy
- Supriya Kumari – Rupa
- Rajpal Yadav – PK Lele
- Murli Sharma – INS Pawar
- Atul Parchure – Mota
- Adi Irani
- Kurush Deboo – Director Subhash Kapoor

== Music ==
The music for Zindagi 50–50 is given by Amjad Nadeem and Vivek Kar consist of following Audio List. Veteran composer Bappi Lahiri sung for Vivek Kar in this film title track.

== Soundtrack ==
Zindagi 50–50

Soundtrack album by Amzad-Nadeem
- Released: 2013
- Genre: Feature film soundtrack
- Label: T-Series
- Producer: Veeraj Kumar

Amzad-Nadeem chronology
Zilla Ghaziabad (2013)	Zindagi 50–50 (2013)

T-Series acquired the music rights for Zindagi 50–50

No.	Title	Lyrics	Music	Artist(s)	Length
1.	"Zindagi 50–50" (Title track)	Deepak Agrawal	Vivek Kar	Bappi Lahiri, Antara Mitra & Gufy
2.	"Tu Saamne Jo Aaye"	Shabbir Ahmed	Amjad-Nadeem	Mika Singh
3.	"Sadde Naal aaja"	Ashish Pandit	Vivek Kar	Manak-E, Neha Batra & Gufy
4.	"Toh Se Naina"	Shabbir Ahmed	Amjad-Nadeem	Rekha Bhardwaj
5.	"Rabba"	Shabbir Ahmed	Vivek Kar	Rahat Fateh Ali Khan
6.	"Delhi Delhi"	Dev Negi, Vivek Kar	Vivek Kar	Dev Negi

== Critical reception ==
Professional ratings
Review scores
Source	Rating
Rediff.com	2/5 stars

Prasanna D Zore for Rediff.com has given 2/5 stars and says Zindagi 50–50 makes a brave but half-hearted effort to depict the dark cruelty that surrounds ordinary lives of three women. It fails miserably as sleaze—of language as well as skin—overtakes the proceedings. In Short, The movie is ok for a one time watch.

This movie earned 20–40 million in opening.
