= Rajiv S. Ruia =

Indian writer and film director

Rajiv S Ruia
- Born: Mumbai, India
- Occupations: director, producer, screenwriter
- Years active: 2001–present
- Parent(s): Shyam S Ruia; Rani S Ruia

Rajiv S Ruia is an Indian writer and film director.

== Early life ==
Rajiv was born on 5 August to parents Shyam S Ruia and Rani S Ruia. His native roots are from Rajasthan. However Rajiv was born and brought up in Mumbai. Rajiv studied in Fatima Devi English High School in Mumbai. He did his diploma in Software Engineer and photo designing from S.M. Lal College, Mumbai. With his dream in filmmaking, Rajiv started learning film editing at the age of 16. He joined veteran filmmaker Vijay Reddy & Raman Kumar as an assistant director. He worked with him for 7 years whilst he learnt about film writing and film directing.

== Career ==
Rajiv started his career by working in television. He started his career as an associate director and editor. He also started making music videos and went on to make more than 200 music videos. Rajiv introduced a lot of talented technicians and artists to the film industry. Many of them are well established in the industry today. Rajiv's first super hit film was My Friend Ganesha which was the first composite animation movie to be made in India. The film instantly became favourite among kids. The movie had been telecasted more than thousand times on television. Rajiv went on to make the sequels in My Friend Ganesha 2, My Friend Ganesha 3 and My Friend Ganesha 4 . His other movie was Main Krishna Hoon, with actress Juhi Chawla. The film also had Hrithik Roshan and Katrina Kaif in cameo roles.

== Filmography ==
Year	Film	Credit	Genre	Notes
2001	Koi Hai	Director, writer	Suspense	
2004	Mission Mumbai	Director, writer	Action, patriotic	
2006	My Friend Ganesha	Director, writer	Children movie	
2008	My Friend Ganesha 2	Director, writer	Children movie	
2010	My Friend Ganesha 3	Director, writer	Children movie	
2011	Main Krishna Hoon	Director, writer	Children movie	
2012	Zindagi 50 50	Director, writer, co-Producer	Social	
2015	Chor Bazaari	Director	Rom-com	
2016	Direct Ishq	Director	Drama	
2016	Yudh	Director, Co-Producer	Drama	(Marathi)
2016	Saansein	Director	Romantic horror	
2018	Vithal	Director / Writer	Drama	(Marathi)
2019	Mushkil: Fear Behind You	Director	Romantic horror	
2019	X Ray: The Inner Image	Director	Psychological horror	
2024	Luv You Shankar	Director	Children movie	
