= Main Krishna Hoon =

- Official Film Poster
- Directed by: Rajiv S Ruia
- Written by: Rajiv S. Ruia (story); S. Sachindra (screenplay); Sanjay Masoom
- Produced by: Nandan K. Mahto; Promila Hunter; Kewal Garg
- Starring: Juhi Chawla; Paresh Ganatra; Namit Shah; Swati Aggarwal
- Cinematography: Akram Shaikh
- Edited by: Satish K. Patil
- Music by: Amjad-Nadeem
- Production company: J.C. Film Vision
- Distributed by: Eros International
- Release date: 25 January 2013
- Running time: 134 min
- Country: India
- Language: Hindi

Main Krishna Hoon (transl. I am Krishna) is a 2013 Indian Hindi-language partially animated film directed by Rajiv S. Ruia which stars Juhi Chawla, Paresh Ganatra, and child artist Namit Shah as the primary cast and features real-life Hindi film superstars Hrithik Roshan and Katrina Kaif in guest appearances as themselves. The Hindu god Krishna appears as an animated character in this story to help an orphaned boy also named Krishna.

== Plot ==
An abandoned baby boy is rescued from floodwaters by Kantaben (Juhi Chawla) and Nattubhai (Paresh Ganatra), the kindly proprietors of a small orphanage. They named the baby Krishna because the way he was found parallels the legend of how Krishna came to live with his adopted parents as a baby. Orphan Krishna (Namit Shah) lives happily in the orphanage with Kanta, Nattu, and the other foundling children. But over the years, one by one his other friends are adopted out to families, but he remains. Young Krishna comes to believe that he is unadoptable, unwanted, and will never find a family. In despair, all alone one night, he goes to a temple and prays to Krishna. This is the story of how Krishna himself (in his mischievous childhood 'makhan chor' 'butter thief' avatar) comes to Earth and befriends the young orphan Krishna. Many adventures then ensue as Krishna-from-Heaven helps Krishna-from-Earth to discover his family.

== Cast ==
- Juhi Chawla as Kantaben
- Paresh Ganatra as Nattubhai
- Namit Shah as Krishna, the orphan
- Raj Premi as Angar Singh/Kansa
- Rajan Verma as Paddu Singh
- Swati Aggarwal as Parsi Teacher
- Hrithik Roshan as himself
- Katrina Kaif as herself
- Rajneesh Duggal (special appearance as featured male dancer in song "Govinda Aala Re")
- Misti Mukherjee (special appearance as featured female dancer in song "Govinda Aala Re")

== Production ==
Juhi Chawla, who portrays Kantaben, the headmistress of the orphanage, said she accepted the film after taking her two children, then aged 11 and 9, to see Rajiv S. Ruia's earlier film My Friend Ganesha 3. She said their enjoyment of the film made her realise the popularity of such stories with child audiences, which influenced her decision to join the project. Chawla also recorded the song “Om Namo Namah”, which plays over the opening credits and was picturised on her alongside a group of children.

== Music ==
The music for Main Krishna Hoon is given by Amjad-Nadeem and consist of following tracklist.

=== Tracklist ===
All tracks are written by Shabbir Ahmed.

No.	Title	Singer(s)	Length
1.	"Main Krishna Hoon"	Preeti & Pinky	5:00
2.	"Om Namo Namah"	Juhi Chawla	4:07
3.	"Theme Flute" (Instrumental)		0:56
4.	"Govinda Aala Re"	Javed Ali	5:00
5.	"Hare Rama Hare Krishna"	Shankar Mahadevan & Shweta Pandit	4:08
6.	"Maa"	Mohammed Salamat	5:19
