= Lankini =

Demoness in the Hindu epic Ramayana

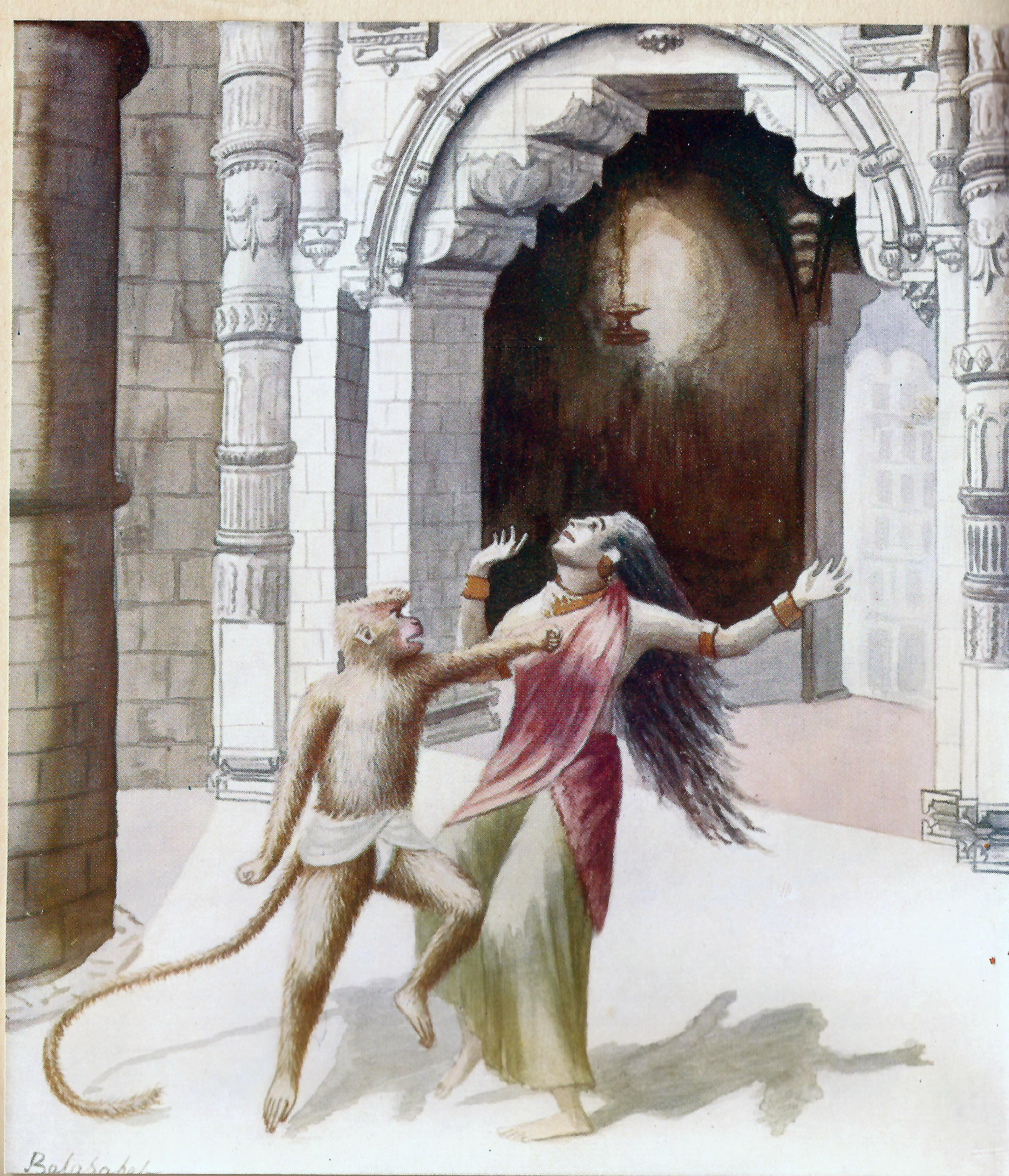
Hanuman strikes Lankini.

Lankini was a powerful demoness from the ancient Hindu epic Ramayana. Her name literally means "The woman of Lanka" as she was the female personification of the city itself and was the guardian to the doors of Lanka.

== Brahma's curse ==
According to the Ramayana, Lankini was once the guardian of the abode of Brahma. As she guarded the home of the creator, Brahma, she became arrogant and prideful about her position. She treated others in the palace with contempt due to which she was cursed by Brahma to guard the city of demons forever. Lankini realised her mistake and begged for forgiveness. However, it was not possible for Brahma to take back the curse, and instead gave her a boon that she would be freed of the curse only when a vanara defeated her in combat, and thus bring to end the age of the demons.

== Encounter with Hanuman ==
In the Ramayana Hanuman encounters Lankini at the gates of Lanka when he was appointed the task of searching for Sita. When accosted by Lankini and asked about his identity and purpose of visit, Hanuman not wanting to reveal his mission, cleverly replies that he has come from the forest desiring to see the famed city of Lanka and its beauty. However, Lankini realises that he is an intruder and attacks him. Mindful of the fact that she is a woman, Hanuman softly strikes her back just enough to make her fall and bleed. A dazed and confused Lankini immediately realises her opponent was no mere monkey and asks for forgiveness, knowing that Brahma's prophecy has come true. Hanuman forgives her as he prepares to continue his quest into Lanka, leaving Lankini behind, who is now free of the curse.
