= Ashish Sharma =

Indian actor

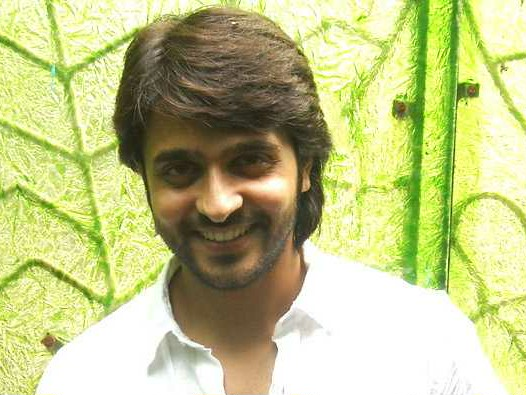
- Born: 30 August; Jaipur, Rajasthan, India
- Education: National Institute of Fashion Technology
- Occupations: Actor; producer
- Years active: 2010–2022
- Notable work: Chandragupta Maurya: Rangrasiya; Siya Ke Ram
- Spouse: Archana Taide (m. 2013)

Ashish Sharma (born 30 August) is an Indian actor and producer. He is known for his roles in Siya Ke Ram, Rangrasiya, Prithvi Vallabh and Chandragupta Maurya. He is winner of Jhalak Dikhhla Jaa season 7. He is co-founder of the production company Rachayita Films. In 2019, he won 'Best Actor' award at the New York City South Asian Film Festival (NYC SAFF) for the film Khejdi.

== Early life ==
Sharma was born in Jaipur, Rajasthan; his father was a IAS officer. He graduated with a degree in fashion designing from the National Institute of Fashion Technology (NIFT), Delhi. He participated in theatre during his early years. Later, he relocated to Mumbai, and underwent formal theatre acting training at Anupam Kher's 'Actor Prepares' academy. He is co-founder of the production company Rachayita Films, alongwith his wife Archana Taide.

== Career ==
In 2010, Sharma made his film debut in Dibakar Banerjee's anthology film Love Sex Aur Dhokha. Later, he made his television debut as male lead in Imagine TV's Gunahon Ka Devta. In 2011, he starred as king "Chandragupta Maurya" in the historical drama Chandragupta Maurya, which received positive reviews.

In 2014, Sharma got his breakthrough when he played "Major Rudra Pratap Ranawat", a Border Security Force (BSF} officer on Colors TV series RangRasiya, which garnered critical acclaim. He won Colour TV's dance reality show Jhalak Dikhhla Jaa season 7, where he partnered with choreographer Shampa Sonthalia. He also hosted the inspirational non-fiction series Tujhse Naaraaz Nahin Zindagi, where he played a radio jockey sharing real-life stories. In 2015, he starred as lord "Rama" in Star Plus's devotional Hindi series Siya Ke Ram; his performance was highly appreciated.

In 2018, Sharma starred in Sony TV's series Prithvi Vallabh. Later, he and his wife Archana Taide produced Khejdi, a transgender centric film adapted from Kiran Singh's short story "Sanjha". He played the lead, winning 'Best Actor' award at the New York City South Asian Film Festival.

In 2019, Sharma portrayed Prime Minister Narendra Modi in the Eros Now's web series Modi: Journey of a Common Man, directed by Umesh Shukla. In 2022, he starred in director Karan Razdan's film Hindutva .

== Personal life ==
On 30 January 2013, Sharma married television actress Archana Taide in Jaipur, in both Hindu and Christian tradition.

== Filmography ==
=== Television ===
Year	Show	Role	Notes	Ref(s)
2010	Gunahon Ka Devta	Avdhesh Singh Thakur	Lead role	
2011	Chandragupta Maurya	Chandragupta Maurya	Lead role	
2012	Punar Vivaah	Ranveer	Guest role	
2012	Rab Se Sohna Isshq	Ranveer Singh / Fateh Singh Rathore / Jeet Singh	Lead role	
2013	Rangrasiya	Rudra Pratap Ranawat	Lead role	
2015	Tujhse Naraaz Nahin Zindagi	Radio Jockey	Host	
2015	Siya Ke Ram	Rama	Lead role	
2018	Prithvi Vallabh	Prithvi Vallabh	Lead role	

=== Variety show ===
Year	Show	Role	Notes	Ref(s)
2014	Jhalak Dikhhla Jaa; Season 7	Contestant	Won	

=== Films ===
Year	Film	Role	Ref(s)
2010	Alha Udhal	Udhal	
2010	Love Sex Aur Dhokha	Shahid	
2012	Zindagi Tere Naam	Vishal	
2012	The Undertaker	The Undertaker	
2018	Khejdi	Khejdi	
2022	Hindutva	Bharat Shastri	

=== Web series ===
Year	Series	Role	Ref(s)
2019	Modi: Journey of a Common Man	Narendra Modi	
2020	Modi: Journey of a Common Man; Season 2	Narendra Modi	

== Awards and nominations ==
Year	Award	Category	Show	Result	Ref.
2013	Zee Rishtey Awards	Favourite Popular Face: Male	Rab Se Sohna Isshq	Won	
2014	Indian Television Academy Awards	Gr8! Performer Male	Rangrasiya	Won	
2014	Indian Television Academy Awards	Best Actor: Drama	Rangrasiya	Nominated	
2014	Indian Television Academy Awards	Best Actor: Popular	Rangrasiya	Nominated	
2014	Indian Telly Awards	Best Actor	Rangrasiya	Nominated	
2014	Asian Viewers Television Awards	Best Actor	Rangrasiya	Nominated	
2016	Star Parivar Awards	Best Beta	Siya Ke Ram	Won	
2016	Star Parivar Awards	Favourite Pati	Siya Ke Ram	Nominated	
2016	Star Parivar Awards	Best Jodi	Siya Ke Ram	Nominated	
2019	New York City South Asian Film Festival	Best Actor	Khejdi	Won	
