= Raeth =

Raeth Band
- Origin: Karachi
- Genres: Sufi rock
- Years active: 2006–2008; 2010–present
- Labels: Universal Music, Fire Records, T-Series
- Website: http://www.raethmusic.com

Raeth (Urdu: ریت transl. "Shifting Sands") is a Pakistani Sufi rock band. The band follows in the footsteps of other Pakistani, and Pakistani-American groups such as Junoon, Strings, and Jal. They have garnered a significant fan base in both Pakistan and India.

The band can be found on Twitter, Facebook, and Vimeo, while their music is available on streaming services such as YouTube, Last.fm, Apple Music, and Google Play.

== Background ==
Raeth was initially formed in 2006 by students from Karachi, Pakistan Wajhi Farooki (vocals), Mustafa Asad (bass), and Syed Farabi Hassan (lead guitar). The band was launched in 2006 by Fire Records at a local beach club in DHA.

"Bhula Do," a single from their debut album Raeth, was ranked among the top four best-selling audio releases in Pakistan, and became the number one on MTV Top Charts next to Kailash Kher's "Saaiyan" in 2014. The album itself made it to No 7 on the Indian Planet M charts. In 2006, Raeth was also featured on MTV India and Channel V as an up-and-coming group.

== Other work ==
In 2013, Raeth worked alongside musical director Chirantan Bhatt on the remake of Indian action film Zanjeer, starring Priyanka Chopra.

In April 2020, Raeth lead singer Wajhi Farooki organized the online Anti-Corona Indo-Pak Concert, which he and two other artists—Bangladeshi folk singer Indira Majumdar and Kolkata-based Kinjal Bhattacharya—livestreamed an hour-long jam session on Instagram.

== Members ==
Original:

- Wajhi Farouqui – lead vocals former
- Syed Farabi Hassan – lead guitar
- Mustafa Asad – bass former

== Discography ==
=== Debut Album: Raeth ===
Songs
Title	Available	Chart Positions
Bhula Do		n/a
Tumhare Liye (Bhige Se Gesu Hain Tere)		n/a
Dur Jag Mein Woh Tara		n/a
Ab Kyun		n/a
Ansoo		n/a
Bhula Do (acoustic version)		n/a
Rangon Ko		n/a
Akela Hun Main		n/a
Kitne Zalim Hain		n/a
Raat Aur Chandni		n/a
Bhula Do (remix)		n/a

== EPs & Singles ==
Songs
Title	Available	Chart Positions
Raat au Chandni		n/a
Hum Asmaan Chulenge (cricket mix)		n/a
Woh Shafar - Wajhi (featuring Sangram Singh)		
