= Rajneesh Duggal =

Indian actor and model (born 19 November 1980)

Rajniesh Duggall
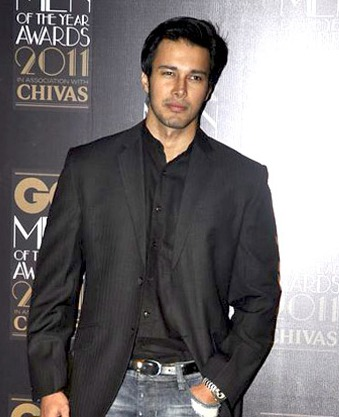
- Duggall in 2011
- Born: 19 November 1979 (age 46)
- Occupations: actor; Model
- Years active: 2008–present
- Spouse: Pallavee Duggal (m. 2010)

Rajniesh Duggall (born 19 November 1980) is an Indian model and an actor known for his roles in television and films. He is the winner of title Grasim Mr. India 2003 and Kingfisher 'Model of the Year' award. He made his Bollywood debut in the horror thriller 1920. He participated in the reality show Fear Factor: Khatron Ke Khiladi 5, emerging as the winner.

== Education ==
Duggal graduated with a Bachelor of Business Administration degree from Apeejay School of Management and a B.Com from Delhi University.

== Career ==
Duggall started his career as a model by winning the title of Mister India World. He has also done TV commercials and ad campaigns like Raymond suitings, Kit Kat, Monte Carlo, Wagon R, Yamaha, Videocon and Clinic All Clear.

He made his acting debut in 2008 with Vikram Bhatt's horror thriller movie 1920, alongside Adah Sharma, where he played the lead role of Arjun Rathod, a man who vows to protect his possessed wife. In 2011, Duggal appeared in horror thriller Phhir. He portrayed the role of Kabir Malhotra, a doctor who is in the search of his missing wife. In 2012, Duggal appeared in supernatural thriller Dangerous Ishhq co-starring Karishma Kapoor and Jimmy Sheirgill. In 2014, Duggal played the role of Deepak in Rajshri Productions' Samrat & Co.

In 2014, Duggal went on to become the winner of the television stunt reality show Khatron Ke Khiladi Season 5.

Duggal appeared in the music video "Mohabbat Barsa Dena Tu", alongside Surveen Chawla, from horror movie Creature 3D. In 2015, he played the lead role of Shravan in Bobby Khan's period thriller drama Ek Paheli Leela, co-starring Sunny Leone and Jay Bhanushali. He also appeared in Syed Ahmed Afzal's crime thriller Laal Rang as an inspector, co-starring with Randeep Hooda and Akshay Oberoi in 2016. He played the role of a young boy from Banaras in the romantic comedy Direct Ishq, portraying the role of a lover in Ek Paheli Leela alongside Sunny Leone. Duggall also did another movie with Leone Beiimaan Love where he played an obsessive lover. He gave a special appearance in Laal Rang, where he played S.P. Gajraj Singh character. In 2016, Duggall has played negative character in movies like Saansein, a supernatural thriller; and Wajah Tum Ho. In 2017, he helmed the role of a fearless warrior Varundev and Jaldev in the TV series Aarambh: Kahaani Devsena Ki. He played the role of Krishna for the TV series Shrimad Bhagwat Mahapuran for Colors in 2019-20.He was seen in Life OK's theatrical show Ramleela Ajay Devgn ke Saath as Lord Ram He was also featured in the video of the song by Bombay Vikings named Chodd Do Aanchal. Duggal has worked in limited series such as Aarambh.

He was associated with the short film Fragile, which focusels oln Fragile X syndrome, a genetic condition linked to autism, and was produced under the banner of Flow Like Water Films.

He is married to Pallavee Duggall, and the couple have a daughter named Teeyaa.

== Awards ==
He is a winner of title Grasim Mr. India 2003. and represented India at the Mr. International 2003 pageant held in London, where he was named the 1st runner-up. In 2005, Duggal received the Kingfisher 'Model of the Year' award.

== Filmography ==
=== Films ===
Year	Title	Role	Notes	Ref.
2008	1920	Arjun Rathod	Debut Film	
2011	Phhir	Kabir Malholtra		
2011	Be Careful	Sameer Malhotra		
2012	Dangerous Ishq	Rohan, Iqbal, Ali and Raj Dutt	Quadruple roles	
2012	This Weekend	Ajay		
2013	Main Krishna Hoon	Himself	Special appearance in "Govinda Aala Re" song	
2014	Samrat & Co.	Deepak Khurana		
2014	Spark	Arjun		
2014	Creature 3D	Himself	Special appearance in "Mohabbat Barsa Dena Tu" song	
2015	Ek Paheli Leela	Shravan		
2016	Laal Rang	SP Gajraj Singh		
2016	Direct Ishq	Vickky Shukla		
2016	Beiimaan Love	Raj		
2016	Wajah Tum Ho	Rahul Oberoi		
2016	Saansein	Abhay		
2018	Udanchhoo	Vikram		
2018	Teri Bhabhi Hai Pagle	Dev		
2019	Mushkil	Abeer		
2022	Khalli Billi	Rohit		
2022	Bal Naren			
2025	Prishati			
2025	Udaipur Files	IB officer Ishwar Singh		
2026	Mahakavya Shri Ramayan Katha	Ravana	Chhattisgarhi film	

=== Television ===
Year	Title	Role	Notes
2012	Ramleela – Ajay Devgn Ke Saath	Rama	
2014	Fear Factor: Khatron Ke Khiladi 5	Contestant	Winner
2017	Aarambh	Varun Dev	
2019–2020	Shrimad Bhagwat Mahapuran	Lord Krishna	
2022	Sanjog	Rajeev Kothari	

=== Web series ===
Year	Title	Role	Channel	Notes
2023	Inspector Avinash	Inspector Ranvijay Ahlawat	JioCinema	
2024	Video Cam Scam	Sub Inspector Vinay Kumar	Epic On	
2024	Postcards	Dr Siddharth Kapoor	Netflix	Global
2025	Exit	Ravi	Waves	Bestseller

Awards and achievements
Preceded by Raghu Mukherjee	Grasim Mr. India (2003)	Succeeded by Sunil Mann
