= Humpty Sharma Ki Dulhania (soundtrack) =

Soundtrack album by Sachin–Jigar, Sharib-Toshi and Jawad Ahmed
- Released: 19 June 2014
- Genre: Feature film soundtrack
- Length: 25:42
- Language: Hindi
- Label: Sony Music
- Producer: Karan Johar

Sachin–Jigar chronology
Shuddh Desi Romance (2013)	Humpty Sharma Ki Dulhania (2014)	Entertainment (2014)

Shaarib-Toshi chronology
Jackpot (2013)	Humpty Sharma Ki Dulhania (2014)	Zid (2014)

Humpty Sharma Ki Dulhania is the soundtrack album to the 2014 film of the same name, directed by Shashank Khaitan and produced by Dharma Productions, starring Varun Dhawan, Alia Bhatt and debutante Sidharth Shukla. The film's soundtrack featured eight songs composed by Sachin–Jigar and Shaarib-Toshi and lyrics written by lyricist Kumaar and Irshad Kamil. The album was released through Sony Music India on 19 June 2014.

== Background ==
The song "Saturday Saturday" was the first single track released, which was originally composed by The Titans, Badshah and recreated by Sharib-Toshi. The song "Samjhawan" was originally taken from 2010 Punjabi film Virsa and recreated by Sharib-Toshi, with vocals by Arijit Singh and Shreya Ghoshal. The second single track "Mein Tenu Samjhawan Ki" is sung by actress Alia Bhatt while lyrics have been given by lyricist Kumaar. DJ Chetas composed The Humpty Mashup also known as Humpty Sharma Ki Dulhania Mashup.

== Release ==
The song "Saturday Saturday" was the first single track released. It was released on 7 June 2014. The song "Samjhawan" was released on 12 June 2014.

== Origin ==
The song "Saturday Saturday" was the first single track released, which was originally composed by The Titans, Badshah and recreated by Sharib-Toshi. The song "Samjhawan" was originally taken from 2010 Punjabi film Virsa and recreated by Sharib-Toshi, with vocals by Arijit Singh and Shreya Ghoshal. The second single track "Mein Tenu Samjhawan Ki" is sung by actress Alia Bhatt while lyrics have been given by lyricist Kumaar. DJ Chetas composed The Humpty Mashup also known as Humpty Sharma Ki Dulhania Mashup.

== Track listing ==
No.	Title	Lyrics	Music	Singer(s)	Length
1.	"Saturday Saturday"	Indeep Bakshi, Badshah, Kumaar	Shaarib-Toshi, The Titans, Badshah	Akriti Kakar, Indeep Bakshi, Badshah	3:30
2.	"Mein Tenu Samjhawan Ki"	Ahmed Anees, Kumaar	Jawad Ahmed, Shaarib-Toshi	Arijit Singh, Shreya Ghoshal	4:29
3.	"Lucky Tu Lucky Me"	Shashank Khaitan	Sachin–Jigar	Benny Dayal, Anushka Manchanda, Varun Dhawan	3:23
4.	"Daingad Daingad"	Irshad Kamil	Sachin–Jigar	Udit Narayan, Divya Kumar, Akriti Kakar, Pratibha Baghel, Deepali Sathe, Niharika Sinha	3:43
5.	"Emotional Fool"	Kumaar	Shaarib-Toshi	Toshi Sabri	3:26
6.	"D Se Dance"	Irshad Kamil	Sachin–Jigar	Vishal Dadlani, Shalmali Kholgade; Additional Vocals: Anushka Manchanda	3:27
7.	"Samjhawan (Unplugged)"	Ahmed Anees, Kumaar	Jawad Ahmed, Sharib-Toshi	Alia Bhatt	3:36
Total length:					25:42
