= A. M. Turaz =

Indian lyricist

A M Turaz
- Occupations: Lyricist, Poet
- Years active: 2002–present

A M Turaz (Aas Mohammed Turaz) is an Indian poet and lyricist. He has worked in television, music albums and films. He has written the lyrics for Bollywood films including Kudiyon Ka Hai Zamaana of 2007, The Unforgettable of 2009 and Guzaarish of 2010, with the songs "Aayat", "Kabhi Jo Baadal Barse", "Tera Zikr", "Udi" and "Tere Liye Mere Kareem". The songs "Ghoomar", "Binte Dil" and "Khalibali" from Padmaavat and Tum Na Aaye from Badla are written by him.

== Career ==
His first assignment in Mumbai was writing lyrics for film Kudiyon Ka Hai Zamana in 2006. This was followed by Jail, Guzarish, Chakravyuh and Jackpot. Turaz written Chakravyuh song "Tata, Birla, Ambani". On this song producer Prakash Jha got legal notice from Birla and Ambani. He was criticised due to his lyrics in film Chakravyuh.

== Filmography ==
The following films feature lyrics by A. M. Turaz:

Film	Year	Director	Credit	Note
Kudiyon Ka Hai Zamaana	2006			
Khallas: The Beginning of End	2007			
Ruslan	2009			
Wada Raha	2009			
Jail	2009			
Mumbai 118	2010			
Guzaarish	2010	Sanjay Leela Bhansali		
Khwaab	2011			
Lanka	2011			
Ghost	2012			
Will You Marry Me	2012			
Chakravyuh	2012	Prakash Jha		
Jeet Lenge Jahan	2013			
Baat Bann Gayi	2013			
David	2013			
Jackpot	2013			
The Unforgettable	2014			
3 A.M.	2014			
Bajirao Mastani	2015	Sanjay Leela Bhansali	Lyricist	
Traffic	2016	Rajesh Pillai		
1:13:7 Ek Tera Saath	2016	Arshad Siddiqui	Lyricist & Dialogue Writer	
Direct Ishq	2016	Rajiv S Ruia	Lyricist & Writer	
Wazir	2016	Bejoy Nambiar		
Dil Jo Na Keh Saka	2017	Naresh Lalwani		Under Production NA
Tera Zikr (Single)	2017	Abishek Sinha	Lyricist	
Padmaavat	2018	Sanjay Leela Bhansali	Lyricist	
Zindagi On The Rocks	TBA			
Phataak	TBA			
Romeo Idiot Jathani Juliet	TBA			
Bhula diya (Single)	2019	Krishna Marimuthu	Lyricist	The song is sung by Darshan Raval
Hume Tumse Pyaar Kitna	2019	Lalit Mohan	Lyricist	
Badla	2019	Sujoy Ghosh	Lyricist	
Marjaavaan	2019	Milap Zaveri	Lyricist	
Superstar	2019	Mohammed Ehteshamuddin	Lyricist	Qawali part of the song Ghalat Fehmi in this Pakistani movie.
Gangubai Kathiawadi	2022	Sanjay Leela Bhansali	Lyricist	
Rashtra Kavach Om	2022	Kapil Verma	Lyricist	
Mission Majnu	2023	Shantanu Bagchi	Lyricist	
Satyaprem Ki Katha	2023	Sameer Vidwans	Lyricist	

== Awards ==
- Radio Mirchi Award 2015
- Radio Mirchi Award 2017

== Books ==
- Lamhe (लम्हे), an anthology of Hindi poetry was published by Poets Corner Group.
