= Samjhawan =

Song from film Humpty Sharma Ki Dulhania

Single by Arijit Singh and Shreya Ghoshal

from the album Humpty Sharma Ki Dulhania
- Released: 12 June 2014
- Recorded: YRF Studio, Mumbai
- Genre: Filmi, Punjabi Folk
- Length: 4:29
- Label: Sony Music India
- Songwriters: Ahmad Anees and Kumaar
- Producer: Stewart Eduri

Music video
- "Samjhawan" on YouTube

"Samjhawan" (transl. Explain) (alias "Main Tenu Samjhawan Ki") is a romantic song from the 2014 Hindi film Humpty Sharma Ki Dulhania. Re-created by Sharib−Toshi, the song is sung by Arijit Singh and Shreya Ghoshal, with lyrics by Ahmad Anees and Kumaar. The song was originally composed by Sahir Ali Bagga and sung by Rahat Fateh Ali Khan for the Punjabi film Virsa. An unplugged version of this song sung by Alia Bhatt, was released on 2 July 2014.

== Development ==
Producer Karan Johar bought rights to the original hit song "Main Tenu Samjhawan", which was sung by Pakistani singers Rahat Fateh Ali Khan and Farah Anwar in the Punjabi film Virsa. Music for the song was re-created by Sharib−Toshi and produced by Stewart Eduri at YRF Studio, with Vijay Kumar and Deepesh as recording engineers.

== Release and chart performance ==
"Samjhawan" was released online on Gaana on 12 June 2014 as a single, and as part of the film soundtrack on 16 June 2014. The song stayed on top of the Indian charts for many weeks. It retained the number one position on Indian iTunes charts for a few weeks, followed by the "unplugged" version, and topped many radio charts.

== Critical reception ==
The song received a mixed response from critics and was highly compared with the original song. Surabhi Redkar of Koimoi commented, "While this Arijit Singh track will blow your mind away, the original song "Main Tenu Samjhawan" by Rahat Fateh Ali Khan is unforgettable and leaves you with the question, why revise such a beautiful number. With the vocals of Arijit Singh, Shreya Ghoshal, the sanctity of the song is not lost, yet all those who enjoy classics will agree the original track sounds better." Rajiv Vijayakar of Bollywood Hungama remarked, ""Samjhawan" is the true killer on the score—a soulful expression of a besotted lover, with lyrics that strike straight at the heart and a deep melody exquisitely rendered by Arijit Singh—arguably the finest singing discovery of the times—and Shreya Ghoshal, the last great singer to come into cinema as of today." Devesh Sharma of Filmfare wrote, "Instead of Rahat and Farah Anwar, the singers here are Arijit Singh and Shreya Ghoshal. Their mellifluous voices give a different twist to the original. The song is sure to get like a million downloads in days to come." Sheetal Tiwari of Bollyspice commented, "While they (Arijit Singh and Shreya Ghoshal) both do a good job rendering the number, Rahat is sorely missed." Srishti Dixit of Bollywoodlife.com stated, "This soulful track by Arijit Singh and Shreya Ghoshal touches the listeners' hearts but not quite like how Rahat Fateh Ali Khan's original version did. The words are the same, the melody is intact but this time even Arijit Singh fails to create magic." Rafat of Glamsham remarked, "Super singer, Arijit Singh has been chosen to do a Rahat but he simply fails to create the same magic. Even 'surili' Shreya's presence does not lift the song to that level."

== Accolades ==
Year	Award	Category	Nominee	Result	Refs
2014	BIG Star Entertainment Awards	Most Entertaining Singer (Male)	Arijit Singh	Nominated	
2014	BIG Star Entertainment Awards	Most Entertaining Singer (Female)	Shreya Ghoshal	Nominated	
2015	Star Guild Awards	Best Female Playback Singer	Shreya Ghoshal	Nominated	
2015	Star Guild Awards	Best Male Playback Singer	Arijit Singh	Nominated	
2015	Star Guild Awards	Best Lyricist	Kumaar	Nominated	
2015	21st Annual Life OK Screen Awards	Best Male Playback Singer	Arijit Singh	Nominated	
2015	21st Annual Life OK Screen Awards	Lyricist	Kumaar	Nominated	
2015	Global Indian Music Academy Awards	Best Female Playback Singer	Alia Bhatt	Nominated	
2015	Global Indian Music Academy Awards	Best Duet	Shreya Ghoshal and Arijit Singh	Won	
2015	7th Mirchi Music Awards	Male Vocalist of the Year	Arijit Singh	Won	
2015	7th Mirchi Music Awards	Female Vocalist of the Year	Shreya Ghoshal	Nominated	
2015	7th Mirchi Music Awards	Song Representing Sufi Tradition	Sharib−Toshi	Nominated	
2015	IIFA Awards	Best Female Playback Singer	Shreya Ghoshal	Nominated	
