= Shraddha Das =

Indian actress

- Das in 2026
- Born: 4 March 1987 (age 39) or 4 March 1991 (age 35); Bombay, Maharashtra, India
- Education: SIES College of Commerce and Economics
- Occupation: Actress
- Years active: 2008–present
- Notable work: Dil Toh Baccha Hai Ji; Arya 2; Sanam Teri Kasam; Gajab Raat; Search: The Naina Murder Case

Shraddha Das is an Indian actress and model who predominantly appears in Telugu and Hindi films. She made her acting debut in the 2008 Telugu film Siddu from Sikakulam. She subsequently appeared in other regional-language films, including Bengali, Kannada and Malayalam productions.

== Early and personal life ==
Shraddha Das was born on 4 March in 1987 or 1991 in Chembur, Bombay, Maharashtra to Bengali parents. Her father, Sunil Das, is a businessman, who hails from Gobindpur, Purulia and her mother, Sapna Das, is a housewife. She was raised in Mumbai, where she completed her studies. Das also studied music during her childhood.

Das graduated from Ruia college and University of Mumbai at SIES College of Arts, Science & Commerce with a Bachelor of Mass Media degree in journalism.

While doing her graduation she worked in theatres and attended workshops conducted by National School of Drama artists like Piyush Mishra, Chittaranjan Giri and Salim Shah. She also appeared in print advertisements for McDowell's, Aristocrat and over 400 catalogues before training at the Gladrags Academy.

Das is a Buddhist, being introduced to the religion by actress Poonam Bajwa.

== Career ==
Shraddha's debut release was the 2008 Telugu film Siddu from Sikakulam. After Target, she quickly signed four Telugu films within six months: 18, 20 Love Story, Diary, Adhineta and Sukumar's Arya 2, which was her first high-profile project.

In 2010, Shraddha made her Bollywood debut in Sai Om Films' maiden venture Lahore, directed by Sanjay Puran Singh Chauhan. Lahore was the first film Shraddha acted in; she shot for the film during the final year of college, but delays meant that several other films of her released earlier. Shraddha played a Pakistani psychiatrist in the film and received critical acclaim for her performance. The film, which focuses on India–Pakistan relations, was released in March 2010 and won awards at the 42nd WorldFest-Houston International Film Festival and the 57th National Film Awards. Her other three releases of the year, A. Karunakaran's Darling, Maro Charitra produced by Dil Raju, the remake of the 1978 film of the same name, and P. Vasu's Nagavalli, saw her playing leading roles. Due to her appearances in the sequels of Arya (Arya 2), Mantra (Diary) and Chandramukhi (Nagavalli), Shraddha acquired the nickname "sequel queen". Her second Hindi film was Dil Toh Baccha Hai Ji that released in 2011. In the next two years she appeared in one film each, Hosa Prema Purana and Dracula 2012 which were her Kannada and Malayalam debut, respectively.

After a year, Shraddha made her Bengali debut with The Royal Bengal Tiger (2014). Later that year, she had two Hindi releases, the romantic comedy Lucky Kabootar and the widely publicised Vivek Agnihotri erotic thriller Zid; both films opened to mixed critical response, Shraddha benefited from Zid and received more offers from Bollywood after its release. Prior to the release of Zid, she made the headlines when she accused her co-star Mannara of injuring her during the shooting and hitting her while she was bound and gagged for a scene in the film. Shraddha has completed three Telugu films, Rey, Bandipotu and Superstar Kidnap. In Rey, she plays an American pop singer and she has stated that her role in the film "is almost on par with that of the hero" and that "There's a certain amount of eccentricity in my character". Superstar Kidnap will see her in the role of a "powerful goon", while Bandipotu will feature her in an item number. She has completed filming a Bollywood film, too, Chai Shai Biscuit, which she had signed before the release of Zid. As of early 2015, she is filming for two bilingual horror films, Ouija, made in Telugu and Kannada, and Haunting of Bombay Mills, made in Telugu and Hindi. She has also been roped to feature in Great Grand Masti.

== Filmography ==
Key
†	Denotes films that have not yet been released

Year	Title	Role	Language	Notes
2008	Siddu from Sikakulam	Nisha	Telugu	
2009	Adhineta	Rajeshwari	Telugu	
2009	Target		Telugu	
2009	18, 20 Love Story	Bharathi	Telugu	
2009	Diary	Maya	Telugu	
2009	Arya 2	Shanti	Telugu	
2010	Lahore	Ida	Hindi	
2010	Maro Charitra	Sandhya	Telugu	
2010	Darling	Nisha	Telugu	
2010	Nagavalli	Geeta	Telugu	
2011	Dil Toh Baccha Hai Ji	Gungun Sarkar	Hindi	
2011	Mugguru	Shalini	Telugu	
2011	Mogudu	Jo	Telugu	
2012	Hosa Prema Purana	Sanjana	Kannada	
2013	Dracula 2012	Taara	Malayalam	
2014	The Royal Bengal Tiger	Nandini	Bengali	
2014	Lucky Kabootar	Kammo	Hindi	
2014	Zid	Priya	Hindi	
2015	Chai Shai Biscuits	Vartika	Hindi	
2015	Rey	Jenna	Telugu	
2015	Bandipotu	Herself	Telugu	Special appearance
2015	Superstar Kidnap	Goon	Telugu	Special appearance
2015	Ouija	Maya	Kannada	
2015	Haunting of Bombay Mills		Hindi	
2016	Sanam Teri Kasam	Ruby Malhotra	Hindi	Cameo
2016	Guntur Talkies	Revolver Rani	Telugu	
2016	Dictator	Herself	Telugu	Special appearance in the Song "Tingo Tingo"
2016	Badsha – The Don	Priya	Bengali	Indo-Bangladesh joint production
2016	Great Grand Masti	Nisha	Hindi	
2016	Aata	Kshetra	Telugu	
2017	Babumoshai Bandookbaaz	Yasmin	Hindi	
2017	PSV Garuda Vega	Malini	Telugu	
2018	Teen Paheliyan	Damini	Hindi	Anthology film; Mirchi Malini segment
2018	Pure Soul	Shweta	English	Short Film
2019	Udgharsha	Krithika	Kannada	
2019	Hippi	Herself	Telugu	Cameo appearance
2019	Panther: Hindustan Meri Jaan	Ziya	Bengali	
2021	Ek Mini Katha	Junior Guruji	Telugu	
2021	Kotigobba 3	Kangana	Kannada	
2023	Nireekshana	Police Officer	Telugu	Only dubbed version released
2024	Paarijatha Parvam	Parvaty	Telugu	Also sang "Rang Rang Rangeela (Female)".
2025	Search: The Naina Murder Case	Raksha Patil	Hindi	TV series on JioHotstar
2026	Lechindi Mahila Lokam			
2026	Gajab Raat	Neha Prabhu	Hindi	A Netflix movie
TBA	Arrdham †	TBA	Telugu	Filming
