= Kabhi Jo Baadal Barse =

2013 Hindi song

Song by Arijit Singh and Shreya Ghoshal

from the album Jackpot
- Released: 1 November 2013
- Genre: Pop; Filmi
- Length: 4:14
- Label: T-Series
- Composer: Sharib–Toshi
- Lyricists: A. M. Turaz, Azeem Shirazi

Jackpot track listing
- 1. "Kabhi Jo Baadal Barse"; 2. "Full Jhol"; 3. "Bol Bugger Bol"; 4. "Jackpot Jeetna"; 5. "Kabhi Jo Baadal Barse (Remix) [feat. Maxi]"; 6. "Jackpot"; 7. "Eggjactly"; 8. "Kabhi Jo Baadal Barse (Female)"; 9. "Now You See, Now You Don't"; 10. "Kabhi Jo Baadal Barse (Remix) [feat. Rishi]"

Music video
- "Kabhi Jo Baadal Barse" on YouTube

Kabhi Jo Baadal Barse (transl. When the clouds rain someday) is a Hindi song from the 2013 Hindi film, Jackpot. Composed by Sharib–Toshi, the song is sung by Arijit Singh, with lyrics by A. M. Turaz and Azeem Shirazi. The music video of the track features actors Sunny Leone and Sachiin J Joshi. A female version of the same song was released as part of the film soundtrack, which was rendered by Shreya Ghoshal.

== Background ==
The song is composed by Sharib Sabri and Toshi Sabri. In the composition, the duo infused piano notes and sound of rainfall with minimal music arrangements. Lead actor of the film, Sachiin J Joshi assisted music director Sharib–Toshi in developing the track. Director of the film, Kaizad Gustad said; "[Joshi] has an amazing sense of rhythm and has contributed significantly to the music of the film". The song appears four times in the soundtrack album of the film. The original version was sung by Arijit Singh while the female version was rendered by Shreya Ghoshal and it includes two remixes of the male version. British Asian music producer Rishi Rich re-mixed the song, fusing traditional Bollywood sounds with the vocals of Singh, along with the voice of British reggae vocalist Maxi Priest. Mixed by Rich, a higher tempo on a club mix version of the song was released as part of the soundtrack.

== Music video ==
=== Background ===
The song was shot in Kuang Si Falls and it was choreographed by Bosco-Caesar. The music video which is set in a forest, is picturised on Sunny Leone and Joshi.

== Release and response ==
The song was released digitally as part of the soundtrack of film on 1 November 2013. The music video of the song was officially released on 4 November 2013, through the YouTube channel of T-Series. Out of the four versions, the film incorporated the male version of the song which is sung by Arijit Singh. A lyrical music video of the female version, performed by Shreya Ghoshal, was released on 9 November 2013.

== Critical reception ==
Writing from Rediff.com, Joginder Tuteja calling the song "terrific", appraised the vocals by Arijit Singh, lyrics by Turaz and Azeem Shirazi, and the "beautiful romantic" composition by Sharib–Toshi. Tutejer further stated; "The singer does tremendously well in this love song [...] It's so good that it's been repeated three more times in the album".

Rajiv Vijayakar of Bollywood Hungama, calling it "a killer of a song", described Singh's rendition in the song as "transparent soulfulness". He further mentioned; "The lyrics move from eulogy of the beloved to acceptance and later angst. The composition seems to have wandered in straight from a Mukesh Bhatt-Mahesh Bhatt film in its haunting intensity.

=== Female version ===
Writing from Rediff.com, Joginder Tuteja stated that version is "good enough to firmly establish the placement of this song as one of the best in recent months".

Rajiv Vijayakar of Bollywood Hungama, calling the version "more accomplished" and "more placid in vocals and orchestration", felt that Ghoshal's "classical nuances and her artistry shines in the tiny inflections in her renditions, taking the song to another dimension".

== Track listing and formats ==
- Original Motion Picture Soundtrack
1. "Kabhi Jo Baadal Barse" (Male Version) – 4:14
2. "Kabhi Jo Baadal Barse" (Female Version) – 4:08
3. "Kabhi Jo Baadal Barse" (Remix) [feat. Maxi Priest] – 4:12
4. "Kabhi Jo Baadal Barse" (Remix) [feat. Rishi] – 4:08
- Remix Single
1. "I'll Be Waiting (Kabhi Jo Baadal ft Arjun Coomaraswamy)" – 4:02
2. "Kabhi Jo Badal Barse/Hold On" (feat. Muki & TJ Rehmi) – 3:48
3. "Kabhi Jo Badal Barse" (EDM Remix) – 3:32
4. "'Kabhi Jo Badal Barse Unplugged' (DJ Chetas ft. Arijit Singh Sachin Joshi T-Series) – 3:11
