= Hume Tumse Pyaar Kitna =

2019 Indian Hindi-language romantic drama film

- Theatrical release poster
- Directed by: Lalit Mohan
- Written by: Faisal Akhtar; Lalit Mohan; Karanvir Bohra
- Screenplay by: Rahul Patel; Nandan; Lalit Mohan (dialogues)
- Produced by: Mahendra Bohra; Belvie Productions
- Starring: Karanvir Bohra; Priya Banerjee; Samir Kochhar
- Cinematography: Santosh Thundiyal
- Edited by: Prashant Rathore; Kannu Prajapati
- Music by: Songs: Raaj Aashoo; Jeet Gannguli; Tony Kakkar; DJ Emenes (MIB); Shaarib-Toshi; Score: Amar Mohile
- Distributed by: T-Series
- Release date: 5 July 2019
- Running time: 91 minutes
- Country: India
- Language: Hindi

Hume Tumse Pyaar Kitna (transl. How much I love you) is a 2019 Indian Hindi-language romantic thriller film produced by Mahendra Bohra and Belvie Productions. The film is financed by Jitendra Gulati and directed by Lalit Mohan; it stars Karanvir Bohra, Priya Banerjee and Sameer Kochar; and follows the limerence of Dhruv (played by Bohra) resulting from an obsessive attraction to Ananya (played by Banerjee). The film was theatrically released in India on 5 July 2019.

== Cast ==
- Karanvir Bohra as Dhruv Mittal
- Priya Banerjee as Ananya Tripathi
- Sameer Kochar as Ranvir Dhillon
- Mahesh Balraj
- Bhavin Bhanushali
- Nikita Nagpal
- Aryaveer Mehar
- Mudassir Hussain
- Scarlett Wilson as an item number "Manmohini"

== Production ==
The shooting of the film was wrapped up in April 2018 with last song shot in Mumbai.

== Marketing and release ==
The first look poster of Karanvir Bohra from the film was unveiled on 24 May 2019.

The film was released on 5 July 2019.

== Soundtrack ==
Hume Tumse Pyaar Kitna

Soundtrack album by Raaj Aashoo, Jeet Gannguli, Tony Kakkar, DJ EMENES (MIB), Shaarib-Toshi
- Released: 3 June 2019
- Recorded: 2018–2019
- Studio: YRF Studios
- Genre: Feature film soundtrack
- Length: 32:57
- Language: Hindi
- Labels: Saregama Music; T-Series
- Producer: Aditya Dev
External audio
- Official Audio Jukebox on YouTube

Singles from Hume Tumse Pyaar Kitna
- 1. "Humne Rait Pe" Released: 7 June 2019; 2. "Hume Tumse Pyaar Kitna (Female)" Released: 17 June 2019; 3. "Manmohini" Released: 25 June 2019; 4. "Hume Tumse Pyaar Kitna (Male)" Released: 1 July 2019

Jeet Gannguli chronology
Marudhar Express (2019)	Hume Tumse Pyaar Kitna (2019)

Tony Kakkar chronology
Luka Chuppi (2019)	Hume Tumse Pyaar Kitna (2019)

Shaarib-Toshi chronology
Mitron (2018)	Hume Tumse Pyaar Kitna (2019)

Raaj Aasho chronology
Hum Chaar (2019)	Hume Tumse Pyaar Kitna (2019)

DJ EMENES (MIB) chronology
Kaashi in Search of Ganga (2018)	Hume Tumse Pyaar Kitna (2019)

The film has an eponymous song from 1981 film Kudrat "Hume Tumse Pyaar Kitna", which has been recreated by Raaj Aashoo with additional lyrics by Shabbir Ahmed and sung by Shreya Ghoshal. The original was sung twice; one by Parveen Sultana and another by Kishore Kumar on composition of R. D. Burman and lyrics by Majrooh Sultanpuri under label of Saregama. Other music composers are Jeet Gannguli, Tony Kakkar, Shabbir Ahmed, DJ EMENES (MIB), Shaarib-Toshi, Background score by Amar Mohile.

Title Track(s)
No.	Title	Lyrics	Music	Singer(s)	Length
1.	"Hume Tumse Pyaar Kitna" (Female Version)	Shabbir Ahmed (Original by Majrooh Sultanpuri)	Raaj Aashoo (Original by R. D. Burman)	Shreya Ghoshal	3:55
2.	"Hume Tumse Pyaar Kitna" (Male Version)	Shabbir Ahmed (Original by Majrooh Sultanpuri)	Raaj Aashoo (Original by R. D. Burman)	Sonu Nigam	3:54
3.	"Hume Tumse Pyaar Kitna" (Thumri Version)	Shabbir Ahmed (Original by Majrooh Sultanpuri)	Raaj Aashoo (Original by R. D. Burman)	Shreya Ghoshal	4:05
Total length:					11:54

Soundtrack
No.	Title	Lyrics	Music	Singer(s)	Length
1.	"Barish"	Shabbir Ahmed	Raaj Aashoo	Jubin Nautiyal, Priyani Vani	3:25
2.	"Manmohini"	Shabbir Ahmed	Raaj Aashoo & DJ Emenes (MIB), Vicky & Hardik	Mika Singh, Kanika Kapoor, Ikka	3:33
3.	"Hashar Se Pehle"	A. M. Turaz	Shaarib-Toshi	Toshi Sabri	4:03
4.	"Humne Rait Pe"	Sajan Agarwal	Tony Kakkar	Tony Kakkar, Neha Kakkar	4:34
5.	"Gehra Halka"	Manoj Muntashir	Jeet Gannguli	Divya Kumar	5:28
Total length:					21:03

== Reception ==
Pooja Raisinghani of The Times of India praised the music, describing the film as a "few decades too late". She described Banerjee's performance as bland, but felt Bohra played his part well. Concluding she wrote, "Apart from a few thrills, the film gives you nothing to obsess over." News18 felt that the story failed to bring up the reason for protagonist's obsessive behaviour. Opining that the film needed a psychological density that could have heightened the plot's crisis line, it concluded, "This one is for fans of Karanvir Bohra who have waited to see him make a smooth transition from television to cinema. His transition is smooth in spite of the choppy waters that the plot negotiates."
