= Jashnn =

2009 Indian musical romantic drama film

- Directed by: Raksha Mistry; Hasnain S Hyderabadwala
- Written by: Shagufta Rafiq
- Produced by: Mukesh Bhatt; Productions; Vishesh Films
- Starring: Adhyayan Suman; Anjana Sukhani; Shahana Goswami; Humayun Saeed
- Music by: Songs: Shaarib-Toshi; Nouman Javaid; Sandesh Shandilya; Background Score: Raju Singh
- Distributed by: Vishesh Films; Zee Motion Pictures
- Release date: 17 July 2009
- Running time: 126 minutes
- Country: India
- Language: Hindi

Jashnn - The Music Within is a 2009 Indian Hindi-language musical romantic drama film written by Shagufta Rafiq and jointly directed by Raksha Mistry & Hasnain S Hyderabadwala. The film stars Adhyayan Suman, Anjana Sukhani, Shahana Goswami and Pakistani actor Humayun Saeed. Produced by Vishesh Films, the film was released on 17 July 2009 and was a box-office bomb.

== Synopsis ==
Akash Verma, a 23-year-old man, thirsts to become a singing icon who can blaze a trail for himself among the galaxy of existing stars. But though he has dreams in his heart, he has been unable to find that distinctive voice that he can call his own that will propel him to the top.

Only when he's shattered by life and unflinchingly looks at the sordid truth straight in the face that he is freeloading off his elder sister Nisha, who, in order to offer Akash a decent life style, has become the mistress of a rich businessman, Aman Bajaj. Even though she is just a mistress, she is able to touch Aman's inner core.

Call it irony or a twist of fate, but the person who sees Akash through these dark times and mentors him when he's down and out is none other than the sister of the very person who Akash hates most in the world – Aman Bajaj. It is Sara Bajaj, Aman's sister, who makes him realize that he is an extremely talented man who is simply going through a bad phase and that the biggest crime a human being can commit is to give up on himself.

Spurred by life's bittersweet lessons and Sara's genuine love and support, Akash in the harshest winter of his life discovers an invincible summer within himself, thereby discovering his own voice. With this very special tune, which has been soaked with the passion of his lived life, he not only touches his inexhaustible potential and becomes an overnight star but also brings dignity to his beleaguered sister, humbles his biggest detractor, Aman Bajaj, and, in the process, lives up to the faith that Sara had in him all along.

== Cast ==
- Adhyayan Suman as Akash Verma
- Anjana Sukhani as Sara Bajaj
- Shahana Goswami as Nisha Verma
- Humayun Saeed as Aman Bajaj
- Rajendra Sethi
- Natasha Jain
- Atul Kinagi
- Keshav Nadkarni
- Ravi Sharma
- Sumeet Vyas

== Music ==
Jashnn

Soundtrack album by Toshi-Sharib
- Released: 13 June 2009 (India)
- Genre: Feature film soundtrack
- Label: T-Series

The music of Jashnn was composed by Shaarib-Toshi, Nouman Javaid and Sandesh Shandilya, with lyrics provided by Kumaar, Nouman Javaid and Neelesh Misra.

Bollywood Hungama praised the album by giving it 4 stars out of 5, feeling every song worked and quite a few would become memorable with time, like the previous Bhatt scores. Hindustan Times gave it 3 stars out of 5, feeling the album had some nice renditions, which made the soundtrack something to look forward to. CNN-News18 similarly giving it 3 stars out of 5, felt it was a melodious album deserving better promotion. While also feeling it did not have a chartbuster quality to it, the reviewer found it to be among the better albums on the music charts.

Tracklist
No.	Title	Music	Artist(s)	Length
1.	"Aaya Re"	Shaarib-Toshi	KK	4:56
2.	"Aish Karle"	Shaarib-Toshi	Shaarib, Toshi	4:41
3.	"Dard-E-Tanhai"	Nouman Javaid	Nouman Javaid	5:01
4.	"Dard-E-Tanhai" (K & G Kilogram Mix)	Nouman Javaid	Nouman Javaid	5:01
5.	"Main Chala"	Nouman Javaid	Nouman Javaid	5:27
6.	"Main Chala" (Unplugged)	Nouman Javaid	Nouman Javaid	1:11
7.	"Nazrein Karam"	Shaarib-Toshi	KK, Shreya Ghoshal	5:31
8.	"Nazrein Kahaan Soti Hain" (K & G Kilogram Mix)	Shaarib-Toshi	KK, Shreya Ghoshal	4:47
9.	"Tere Bin"	Sandesh Shandilya	Shaan, Shreya Ghoshal	4:34
