= Atul Kinagi =

Indian actor

Atul Kinagi is an Indian actor, working in film and television industry. He made his Bollywood debut with the supporting role in Hindi film Jashnn, directed by Raksha Mistry, alongside Anjana Sukhani and Adhyayan Suman. In 2014, he started his television career with the role of Jai Mahanto Jagannath in Anil V. Kumar's soap opera Main Naa Bhoolungi, alongside Aishwarya Sakhuja and Vikas Manaktala.

== Filmography ==
Year(s)	Title	Role	Notes
2009	Jashnn		Film
2009	Shaabash! You Can Do It	Vikram	Film
2014	Main Naa Bhoolungi	Jai Mahanto Jagannath	TV series
