= Diary (2009 film) =

2009 Telugu film

- Official poster
- Directed by: Machakanti Rama Krishna
- Screenplay by: Aroon; Kalyan Ram Chukka
- Story by: Aroon
- Produced by: Kalyan Ram Chukka
- Starring: Sivaji; Shraddha Das
- Cinematography: Srinivasa Reddy
- Edited by: Gowtam Raju
- Music by: Anand
- Release date: 29 May 2009
- Country: India
- Language: Telugu

Diary is a 2009 Indian Telugu-language psychological thriller film directed by Machakanti Ramakrishna and starring Sivaji and Shraddha Das in lead roles.

The film is marketed as a sequel to Mantra (2007), but the two films are unrelated.

== Plot ==
Vamsi purchases a used, fully-furnished beach house in Vizag from a real estate dealer. One night, he saves a dancing girl named Maya from a goon at a local gathering. Due to heavy rain, Maya stays at Vamsi's house. While exploring the house, they discover a diary dated 2002, written by the previous owner. The diary reveals that the owner's wife was killed, and her spirit is rumoured to haunt the house. As the events from the diary begin to unfold, Vamsi and Maya find themselves entangled in the mystery. The story follows their journey to uncover the truth behind the house's dark past.

== Cast ==
- Sivaji as Vamsi
- Shraddha Das as Maya
- Dr Sivaprasad as Kanchu Kanakayya alias KK
- Chinnikrishna as Vamsi's driver
- Jeeva as Maya's molester
- Sridhara Rao as Albert
- Mousami Udeshi as Mona
- Yandamuri Veerendranath as Sastry (cameo appearance)
- Harsha Vardhan as Police officer

== Production ==
The film was promoted as a sequel to Mantra (2007) although it is not.

== Music ==
The music was composed by Mantra Anand.

Track listing
No.	Title	Length
1.	"Priya Premava"	4:40
2.	"Sitti Silakamma"	3:40
Total length:		8:20

== Reception ==
Jeevi of Idlebrain.com rated the film 2.5/5 and wrote, "Though there are a few chilling moments in the movie, logic-less climax and slack second half work against the movie".
