= Priyanka Shah =

Indian netball player and actress

- Born: Pune, Maharashtra, India
- Occupations: Actress, netball player
- Beauty pageant titleholder
- Years active: 2015–present
- Netball career
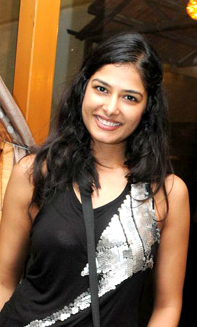
Years	Club team	Apps
Years	National team	Caps
2005–?	India	

Priyanka Shah is an Indian former netball player, actress and beauty pageant titleholder. She is the winner of Miss Tourism India 2007 and a finalist in Femina Miss India 2007. She is also the winner of Get Gorgeous 2005.

== Early life and career ==
Shah's parents are Maharashtrian and Gujarati. Shah is an Engineering graduate from MIT College Pune.

Shah made her netball debut at the Asian Youth Championship in Malaysia in 2002. She is also the former captain of the India national netball team. She captained the national team at the 2005 Asian Netball Championships.

In 2005, she won the second edition of the reality television show Get Gorgeous.

Shah has completed a course in acting at the Kishore Namit Kumar acting school in Mumbai. She was supposed to make her debut through a Tamil film titled Kalla Kadhalan opposite actor Sibiraj and Kannada actor Vishal Hedge in 2008, but the film was shelved. She starred in I Love Desi (2015).
