= Jakkanna =

- Directed by: Vamsi Krishna Akella
- Written by: Vamsi Krishna Akella
- Produced by: Sudarshan Reddy
- Starring: Sunil; Mannara Chopra
- Cinematography: C. Ramprasad
- Edited by: M. R. Varma
- Music by: Dinesh
- Release date: 29 July 2016
- Country: India
- Language: Telugu

Jakkanna is a 2016 Indian Telugu-language comedy film directed by Vamsi Krishna Akella. The film features Sunil and Mannara Chopra in the lead roles, with Kabir Duhan Singh and Saptagiri playing supporting roles. Jakkanna released on 29 July 2016. The film was later dubbed in Hindi.

== Plot ==
A man's (Sunil) attempts to repay a kindness earns him the wrath of a ruthless gangster.

== Cast ==
- Sunil as Ganesh alias Jakkanna
- Mannara Chopra as Sahasra
- Kabir Duhan Singh as Uppalapati Byrraju alias Bairagi
- Prudhvi as Circle Inspector Katakatala Kattappa
- Saptagiri as Kung Fu Instructor
- Chitram Srinu as Seenu
- Harsha Chemudu as Kung Fu Student
- Raghu Karumanchi as Bairangi Manishi
- Satya Prakash as Auto driver
- Satya as Satya Prakash
- Junior Relangi as Police officer
- Raja Ravindra
- Nagineedu
- Ashish Vidyarthi

== Soundtrack ==
No.	Title	Lyrics	Singer(s)	Length
1.	"Jakkanna"	Kasarla Shyam	Kavya Ajit, Simha Bhagavatula
2.	"Helper"	Sri Mani	Ranjith Govind, Revanth
3.	"Nijanga"	Sri Mani	Karthik
4.	"You Are My Darlingo"	Kasarla Shyam	Rahul Sipligunj, Damini Bhatla
5.	"Andham Tannullona"	Sri Mani	Jithin Raj, Ramya Behara

== Reception ==
A critic from The Times of India wrote that "If you can forget logic for a couple of hours and just let the film humour you, Jakkana can keep you entertained".
