= I Love Desi =

2015 film by Pankaj Batra

- Theatrical Release Poster
- Directed by: Pankaj Batra
- Story by: Satish Jain
- Produced by: Rocky Daswani
- Starring: Vedant Bali; Priyanka Shah; Gulshan Grover
- Cinematography: Vineet Malhotra
- Edited by: Praveen Kathikuloth
- Music by: Sham Balkar; Toshi Sabri; Sharib Sabri
- Production company: Shubh Film
- Distributed by: Trigger Lite
- Release date: 29 May 2015
- Country: India
- Language: Hindi

I Love Desi is a 2015 Indian Hindi romantic comedy film directed by Pankaj Batra. The film stars newcomers Vedant Bali and Priyanka Shah alongside Gulshan Grover. I Love Desi was theatrically released on 29 May 2015.

== Plot synopsis ==
This is a love story, of an urban NRI Punjabi woman from Canada, who marries an Indian man with a rural background, just to inherit her ancestral property, conditioned to this requirement. Before untying this relation forever, as she had planned, she agrees to live for 6 months with her To-be forlorn husband, and gradually falls in love with him.

== Cast ==
- Vedant Bali as Punjab Singh
- Priyanka Shah as Simran
- Gulshan Grover as Bauji
- Shakti Anand as Punjab's brother
- Mannat Singh as Bhabhi
- Krip Suri as Pumma
- Karaan Singh as Jimmy
- Gurpreet Ghuggi as Punjab's friend
- Arun Bali as Simran's father
- Sunita Dheer as Punjab's mother

== Production ==
This film marks the debut of Vedant Bali, Akshay Kumar's manager and former Femina Miss India winner Priyanka Shah. The film marked the debut Hindi production of Rocky Daswani, who previously produced Chhatisgarhi films such as Mayaa (2009) and Toora Rickshawwala (2010). Shah felt her role of a Punjabi NRI was easy for her due to her background in fashion.

The film was primarily shot in Punjab, India and Canada. Although some the crew members couldn't get visas for Canada, Akshay Kumar (who was a Canadian citizen at the time) wrote a letter to the Canadian embassy and visas were issued.

== Soundtracks ==
Music is given by Sham Balkar and Toshi Sabri – Sharib Sabri. One song "Deere Dhree Kam Hogi Udasi" was sung by Rahat Fateh Ali Khan, which was recorded in Dubai as he has not come to India since 2011. Prior to him, four different singers were approached to sing the song but the music directors were dissatisfied with the results. A critic from The Times of India rated the album 2.5/5.

No.	Title	Singer(s)	Length
1.	"Beauty Da Phool"	Toshi Sabri	4:16
2.	"Dil Ka Baje Ektara"	Sharib Sabri, Anweshaa Dutta Gupta	4:28
3.	"Deere Dhree Kam Hogi Udasi"	Rahat Fateh Ali Khan, Jaspinder Narula	5:20
4.	"Holi (Color Zindgi Hai)"	Mika Singh, Sunidhi Chauhan	3:52
5.	"Dooriyan"	Javed Ali, Mahalaxmi Iyer, Sonu Kakkar	5:08
Total length:			23:04
