= Kaagaz 2 =

2024 Indian Hindi-language film

- Theatrical release poster
- Directed by: V. K. Prakash; Jay Dev Banerjee
- Written by: Suman Ankur; Khandelwal Shashank
- Based on: Nirnayakam by V. K. Prakash
- Produced by: Sashi Satish Kaushik; Jay Dev Banerjee; Ratan Jain; Nishant Kaushik
- Starring: Anupam Kher; Darshan Kumar; Satish Kaushik; Smriti Kalra; Anang Desai
- Cinematography: Anu Moothedath
- Edited by: Sanjay Verma
- Music by: Sharib-Toshi; Srijan Vinay Vaishnav
- Production companies: Satish Kaushik Entertainment; Indigo Creation Production; Venus Worldwide Entertainment
- Distributed by: Pen Marudhar Entertainment
- Release date: 1 March 2024
- Running time: 119 minutes
- Country: India
- Language: Hindi

Kaagaz 2 is a 2024 Indian Hindi language courtroom drama film written and directed by V. K. Prakash and Jay Dev Banerjee. Produced by Satish Kaushik Entertainments and Venus Worldwide Entertainment, It is a spiritual successor to 2021 film Kaagaz and stars Anupam Kher, Darshan Kumar, Satish Kaushik, Smriti Kalra, Anang Desai, and Kiran Kumar in pivotal roles. It's a remake of Prakash's Malayalam film Nirnayakam (2015).

Kaagaz 2 was released to positive reviews on March 1 2024. It marks the swan song film of Satish Kaushik following his death on 9 March 2023.

== Premise ==
It is based on Article 21 of the Constitution of India and Article 15 of the Constitution of India, which permits the right to live, and prohibits discrimination on grounds of religion, race, caste, sex or birthplace.

== Cast ==
- Satish Kaushik as Sushil Rastogi
- Anupam Kher as Raj Narayan Singh
- Neena Gupta as Radhika Narayan Singh
- Darshan Kumar as Uday Raj Singh
- Smriti Kalra as Tanisha
- Anang Desai as Politician K.P.Deo
- Kiran Kumar as Chief Justice of High Court
- Aniruddh Dave as Satty
- Shahid Bobby Husain as PA to Politician
- Ankur Suman as Abir Gosain
- Kapil Tilhari as Advocate Sunil Kukreti
- Krishiv Agarwal
- Harry Josh
- Dara Singh Khurana
- Arpit Mishra as Kamlesh Updadhyay
- Kamlesh Upadhaya
- Aishwarya Ojha
- Karan Razdan
- Shabnam Vadhera
- Arnav Roy as News Media Anchor

== Music ==
Kaagaz 2

Soundtrack album by Sharib-Toshi
- Released: 16 February 2024
- Recorded: 2022
- Genre: Feature film soundtrack
- Length: 16:49
- Language: Hindi
- Label: Zee Music Company

Official audio
- Kaagaz 2 - Full Album on YouTube

The music of the film is composed by Sharib-Toshi. Lyrics are written by Rashmi Virag.

Track listing
No.	Title	Singer(s)	Length
1.	"Tere Siva Na Koi Mera"	Shaarib Sabri, Hritu Zee	5:24
2.	"Tera Mera Rishta"	Vishal Dadlani, Shaarib-Toshi	5:19
3.	"Aaj Garda Macha"	Sukhwinder Singh, Shaarib-Toshi	2:58
4.	"Aaj Garda Macha" (Rock Version)	Sukhwinder Singh, Shaarib-Toshi	3:08
Total length:			16:49

== Reception ==
Deepali Singh of The Times of India gave 3.5 out of 5 stating "There are many heartfelt moments, especially in the latter half of the film which are bound to move you and can leave you teary-eyed. Add to that is the fact that this was actor Satish Kaushik's last film. The second one is reason enough to watch the movie."

Ganesh Aaglave of Firstpost rated 3.5 stars and wrote "On the whole, Kaagaz 2 is a befitting tribute to Satish Kaushik with Anupam Kher and Darshan Kumar's superb act."

Rishil Jogani of Pinkvilla rated the film 2.5 stars out of 5 and wrote "Kaagaz 2 does highlight an important concern that civilians face. However, the film's shoddy writing and execution never allows it to take the necessary flight. Those who wish to watch Satish Kaushik in his final appearance or wish to know more about the inconvenience caused by on-road rallies and protests can give the film a try."
