= Lucky Kabootar =

- DVD Cover
- Directed by: Shammi Chhabra
- Produced by: Karan Raj Kanwar
- Starring: Eijaz Khan; Ravi Kishan; Shraddha Das; Sanjay Mishra; Kulraj Randhawa
- Music by: Santokh Singh
- Production company: Inderjit Films
- Release date: 18 April 2014
- Country: India
- Language: Hindi

Lucky Kabootar (transl. Lucky Pigeon) is a 2014 Indian Hindi-language romantic-comedy film, directed by Shammi Chhabra and produced by Karan Raj Kanwar.

Lucky (Eijaz Khan) loves 'modern' Kammo (Shradha Das) but ends up marrying the girl-next-door Lakshmi (Kulraj Randhawa). An accident leads him to believe that his wife is dead.

== Cast ==
- Eijaz Khan as Lucky
- Ravi Kishan as Sunny
- Shraddha Das as Kammo
- Sanjay Mishra as Sexidas Babaji
- Kulraj Randhawa as Laxmi

== Soundtrack ==
No.	Title	Singer(s)	Length
1.	"Tumba Mika Singh And Bhavya Pandit"	Mika Singh, Bhavya Pandit
2.	"Haal Da Marham"	Sunidhi Chauhan
3.	"DJ Te Gulabo Nachdi"	Sunidhi Chauhan, Santhokh Singh, Big Sinn
4.	"Haal Da Marham (Rock version)"	Santokh Singh
5.	"Mein Nahi Rahna Tere Naal"	Sunidhi Chauhan, Shaan, Uvie
6.	"Kripa Babe Di"	Labh Janjua
