= Hosa Prema Purana =

- Directed by: Shivakumar
- Written by: Shivakumar
- Produced by: Prasad Saalumara
- Starring: Nitin Gowda; Shraddha Das; Radhika Gandhi
- Cinematography: Gauri Venkatesh
- Edited by: Srinivas P. Babu
- Music by: Rajesh Ramanath
- Distributed by: Swamy Family Productions; Gajanana Arts
- Release date: 30 October 2012
- Country: India
- Language: Kannada

Hosa Prema Purana (transl. New love story) is a 2012 Kannada romance film starring newcomer Nitin Gowda, Shraddha Das and Radhika Gandhi in the lead roles. The film is directed by Shivakumar. Prasad Saalumara has produced the film under Gajanana Arts banner. Rajesh Ramanath is the music director of the film.

== Cast ==
- Nitin Gowda as Prem
- Shraddha Das as Sanjana
- Radhika Gandhi as Nandini
- Neenasam Sathish as Rahul
- Pooja Gandhi as Special appearance

== Soundtrack ==
Hosa Prema Purana

Soundtrack album by Rajesh Ramanath
- Released: December 2011
- Genre: Feature film soundtrack
- Label: Ashwini Media Networks

Rajesh Ramanath has composed 5 songs.

No.	Title	Lyrics	Singer(s)	Length
1.	"Ninnondige"	Jayanth Kaikini	Rajesh Krishnan, Akansha Badami
2.	"Madhura Madhura"	Dr. Nagendra Prasad	Chaitra H. G., Anoop Bharadwaj
3.	"Say Say Monica"	K. Kalyan	Santhosh, Akansha Badami
4.	"Olave Gelathi"	K. Kalyan	Nanditha, Hemanth
5.	"Onde Baalu"	V. Manohar	Chetan Sosca

== Reception ==
=== Critical response ===
A critic from The Times of India scored the film at 3 out of 5 stars and says "Nithin is perfect as a hero and has done an excellent job. Shraddha Das is quite impressive as live-in partner of Nithin. Radhika Gandhi shines as an innocent girl. Pooja Gandhi makes a brief appearance in a dance sequence. Music by Rajesh Ramanathan has some catchy tunes. Camera by T Venkatesh is eye-catching". A critic from Bangalore Mirror wrote "None of the three main actors, Nithin, Radhika Gandhi and Shraddha Das, look like they were interested in acting. Pooja Gandhi only has a guest appearance in one song while her photo is hung on the wall for another 15 scenes. The director, with no hold over the narrative or the actors cuts a sorry figure. Poor research and self-righteousness kill the story long before it takes off". B S S from Deccan Herald wrote "The dialogues seem to pay lip service to progressive thought. But by then the damage is done and one is left to wait for the end to pan out. Which it does–in another formulaic fashion. Hosa Prema Purana is one film Pooja Gandhi would prefer not to remember".
