= Thikka =

Indian action comedy film

- Theatrical release poster
- Directed by: Sunil Reddy
- Screenplay by: Sheik Dawood G.
- Story by: Sheik Dawood G.
- Produced by: Dr. Rohin Reddy
- Starring: Sai Dharam Tej; Larissa Bonesi; Mannara Chopra
- Cinematography: K. V. Guhan
- Edited by: Karthika Srinivas
- Music by: S. Thaman
- Production company: Sri Venkateswara Movie Makers
- Release date: 13 August 2016
- Running time: 135 mins
- Country: India
- Language: Telugu

Thikka (transl. Frenzy) is 2016 Indian Telugu-language action comedy film produced by Dr. Rohin Reddy on Sri Venkateswara Movie Makers banner and directed by Sunil Reddy. The film stars Sai Dharam Tej, Larissa Bonesi and Mannara Chopra, with Rajendra Prasad, Ajay, Ali, and Vennela Kishore in supporting roles. The music is composed by S. Thaman. with cinematography by K. V. Guhan and editing by Karthika Srinivas.

Production began on 31 July 2015 in Hyderabad. The film was released on 13 August 2016 to negative reviews from critics, who criticized the direction, storyline, irrational and confusing screenplay, and incoherent script, but praised Tej's performance. The film became a box office bomb. However, Mannara Chopra won Special Jury Award for Best Actress at 15th Santosham Film Awards.

== Cast ==
- Sai Dharam Tej as Aditya
- Larissa Bonesi as Anjali
- Mannara Chopra as Virisha
- Rajendra Prasad as Manohar, Aditya's father
- Ajay as Sadhu Bhai
- Ali as Kapoor
- Vennela Kishore as Jayanth
- Posani Krishna Murali as Inspector P. Hymanand
- Raghu Babu as Narsimha
- Mumaith Khan as Kavitha
- Bani J as Kamala
- Anand as Madan Mohan, Anjali's father
- Harsha Vardhan as Mental Doctor
- Jakki as Devraj
- Prabhas Sreenu as Madan Mohan's henchman
- Saptagiri as Manchi Donga
- Satya as Stephen
- Thagubothu Ramesh as Ramesh Yadav
- Fish Venkat as Sadhu's henchman
- Dasanna as Constable
- Kamna Singh as Padma
- S. Thaman as cameo appearance in "Hot Shot Hero"

== Soundtrack ==
Thikka

Soundtrack album by S. Thaman
- Released: 30 July 2016
- Recorded: 2016
- Genre: Soundtrack
- Length: 19:29
- Label: Aditya Music
- Producer: S. Thaman

S. Thaman chronology
Srirastu Subhamastu (2016)	Thikka (2016)	Jaguar (2016)

Music composed by S. Thaman. Music released on Aditya Music Company. Audio launch held on 30 July 2016 at Shilpakala Vedika, Hyderabad.

Track-List
No.	Title	Lyrics	Singer(s)	Length
1.	"Thikka"	Ramajogayya Sastry	Dhanush	3:49
2.	"Hot Shot Hero"	Bhaskarabhatla Ravi Kumar	Simbu, MC Vickey	3:37
3.	"Dirty Picture"	Bhaskarabhatla Ravi Kumar	Usha Uthup, Simha	3:01
4.	"Nee Kosam"	Ramajogayya Sastry	Revanth, S. Thaman (Uncredited)	5:05
5.	"Vellipoke"	Neeraja Kona	S. Thaman	3:31
Total length:				19:29

== Critical reception ==
The film received negative reviews from critics, praising Sai Dharam Tej's performance while heavily criticizing its story, many considering it to be very confusing and weak.
