= Julia Bliss =

Indian actor

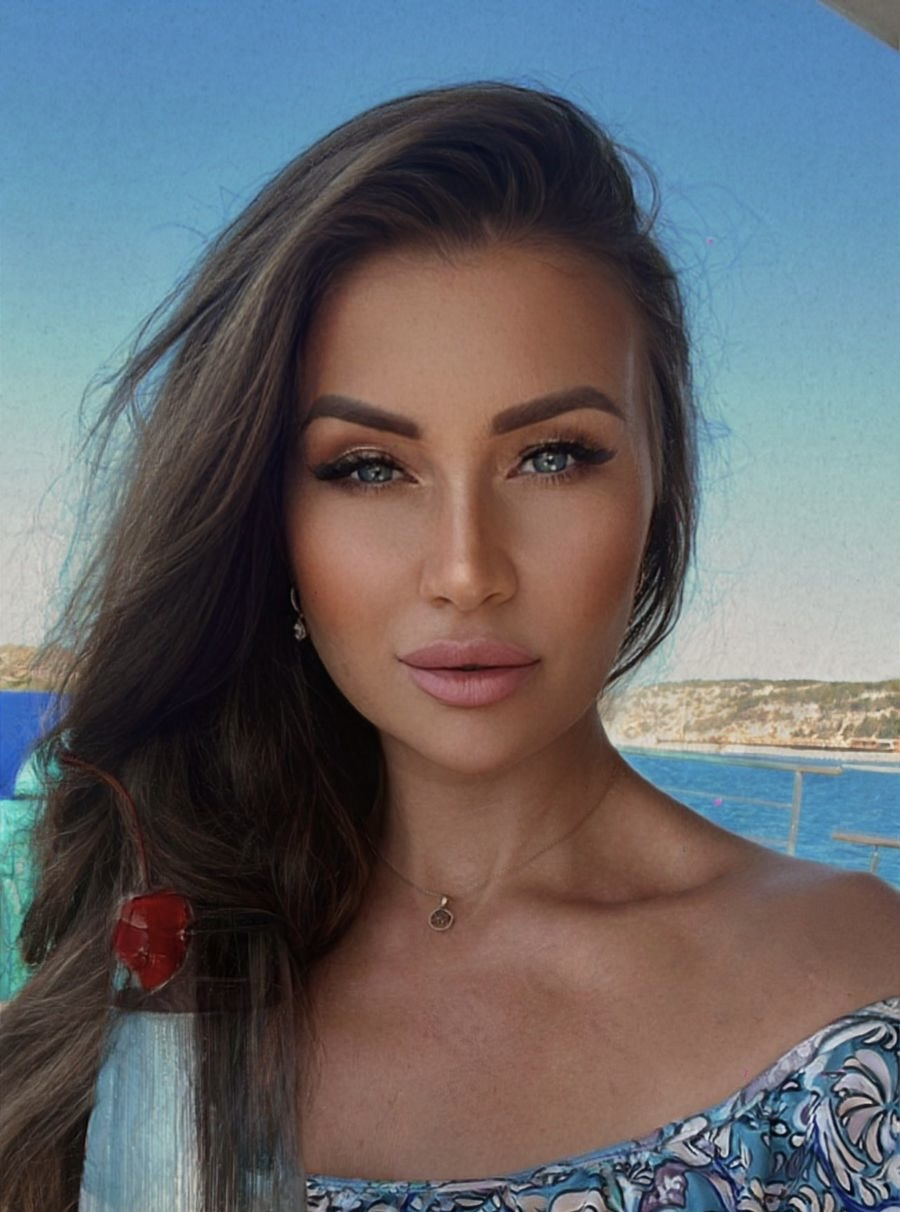
- Born: Julia Belousova; 20 October 1983 (age 42); Omsk, Russia
- Occupations: DJ actress
- Years active: 2008-present
- Known for: Ghost

Julia Bliss is a Russian actress, model and DJ.

== Early life and career ==
Bliss was born in Russia and completed her graduation in IT and management from Omsk State University. Julia began her Bollywood career in 2008 with her debut film Ghost which was released in January 2012.

== Filmography ==
- Ghost (as Mary Madgeline)
- Maattrraan (as Nadia)
- Daawat-e-Ishq (as Firang Girl 1 at Haidari Kabab)
