= Jail (2009 film) =

- Theatrical release poster
- Directed by: Madhur Bhandarkar
- Written by: Madhur Bhandarkar; Anuraadha Tewari; Manoj Tyagi; Raghuvir Shekhawat
- Produced by: Shailendra Singh; Madhur Bhandarkar
- Starring: Neil Nitin Mukesh; Mugdha Godse; Manoj Bajpayee; Arya Babbar
- Cinematography: Kalpesh Bhandarkar
- Edited by: Devendra Murdeshwar
- Music by: Songs: Shaarib-Toshi; Shamir Tandon; Background Score: Amar Mohile
- Production companies: Percept Picture Company; Bhandakar Entertainment
- Release date: 6 November 2009
- Running time: 140 minutes
- Country: India
- Language: Hindi
- Box office: ₹10 crores

Jail is a 2009 Indian Hindi-language prison film written and directed by Madhur Bhandarkar. The film stars Neil Nitin Mukesh, Mugdha Godse, Manoj Bajpayee and Arya Babbar. It was released on 6 November 2009.

== Plot ==
Parag Dixit, a young man living happily with his girlfriend Mansi, is arrested in Bandra after being falsely implicated in a major crime. He is accused of possessing narcotics and firing at a police officer following a confrontation in which his friend Keshav Rathod is critically injured. Keshav is hospitalized, while Parag is remanded to custody and placed in an overcrowded prison barrack.

Outside prison, Mansi hires Advocate Harish Bhatia to defend Parag, but his bail application is rejected. As Parag adjusts to prison life, he befriends several inmates, including Abdul Ghani, who is awaiting trial for accidental murder; Kabir Malik, an associate of underworld don Baba Bhai; poet and prisoner Galib Suratwala; prison insider Nawab; and Joe D'Souza, who is accused in a hit-and-run case. Baba Bhai, who continues to operate his criminal network from inside prison through bribed officials, exerts considerable influence over the inmates and prison administration.

After the charge sheet is filed, Parag's bail is again denied because of the seriousness of the allegations and concerns about evidence tampering. Months later, Keshav dies from his injuries, further reducing Parag's chances of proving his innocence. During this period, Parag develops a close relationship with Nawab, who becomes a mentor to him. Meanwhile, Ghani becomes associated with Baba Bhai and obtains bail, but later dies by suicide after learning that his wife has remarried a police constable. Galib escapes from prison by bribing guards, while Joe is granted bail. Parag, frustrated by Joe's celebration and impending release, assaults him and is subsequently placed in solitary confinement. Nawab intervenes and secures his early release.

With Kabir's assistance, Parag is temporarily allowed to leave prison to visit Mansi and his mother in hospital. Upon his return, Nawab reprimands him for becoming involved with Baba Bhai's associates and warns him of the consequences of accepting their help. Nawab subsequently reveals that he was once forced to kill his younger brother and a gangster after his brother became involved with the criminal.

Two years after his arrest, Parag is convicted and sentenced to ten years' rigorous imprisonment. Having lost faith in the justice system and believing that he has little left to live for, he asks Kabir to arrange his escape through Baba Bhai. Baba Bhai subsequently uses his influence to have Parag transferred to Nasik Jail. During the transfer, a corrupt officer places Parag in the same vehicle as Kabir, whose associates deliberately cause an accident to facilitate their escape. At the last moment, however, Parag chooses not to flee and remains in custody. Jailor Arvind Joshi informs Nawab of Parag's decision, which fills him with pride.

Parag is subsequently transferred to Kolhapur Jail, where he gradually regains hope. Six months later, Mansi appoints a new lawyer, who uncovers evidence establishing Parag's innocence. Parag is acquitted of all charges and released from prison.

After his release, Parag returns to the prison with Mansi as a free man to visit Nawab and pay his respects.

== Cast ==
- Neil Nitin Mukesh as Parag Dixit
- Mugdha Godse as Mansi Pandit
- Manoj Bajpayee as Nawab
- Arya Babbar as Kabir Mallik
- Rahul Singh as Abdul Ghani
- Navni Parihar as Alka Dixit, Parag's mother
- Sandeep Mehta as Advocate Harish Bhatia
- Ashok Samarth as DCP Nagesh Patil
- Chetan Pandit as Jailer Arvind Joshi
- Naseer Abdullah as High Court Judge
- Atul Kulkarni as Parag's second lawyer
- Jignesh Joshi as Keshav Rathod
- Ali Quli Mirza as Joe D' Souza
- Manish Mehta as Galib Suratwala
- Parvez Khan as Bababhai
- Sayali Bhagat as item dancer in the song "Bareily Ke Bazaar Mein" (special appearance)

== Soundtrack ==
Jail

Soundtrack album by Shamir Tandon, Toshi Sabri
- Released: October 5, 2009
- Genre: Feature film soundtrack
- Length: 36:15
- Language: Hindi
- Label: T-Series

The film's music was composed by Shamir Tandon and Shaarib-Toshi, with lyrics written by Toshi Sabri, A. M. Turaz, Sandeep Nath, and Ajay K. Garg.

No.	Title	Lyrics	Music	Singer(s)	Length
1.	"Sainya Ve"	Toshi Sabri	Sharib-Toshi	Toshi Sabri	3:06
2.	"Milke Yun Lagaa"	A. M. Turaz	Sharib-Toshi	Sharib Sabri	3:19
3.	"Bareily Ke Bazaar Mein"	Sandeep Nath	Shamir Tandon	Sonu Kakkar	2:04
4.	"Daata Sun Le"	Ajay K. Garg	Shamir Tandon	Lata Mangeshkar	3:07
Total length:					36:15
