= Sanedo =

Music genre originating in Gujarat

- Cultural origins: Gujarat, India
- Typical instruments: Daklu, Dholak, Manjira

Sanedo (Gujarati: સનેડો) is a type of Gujarati folk music, popularised by Gujarati singer Maniraj Barot.

== History ==
The original pronunciation and word is snehdo (Gujarati: સ્નેહડો), derived from the word sneh (Gujarati: સ્નેહ), meaning love or affection. Sanedo contains couplets of four lines and has a striking resemblance to bhavai, a folk drama form from Gujarat. Gujarati folk artist Arvind Barot performed Sanedo on stage in the 1980s and deserves credit for bringing it to the mainstream. However, it was another Gujarati folk artist, Maniraj Barot, who made Sanedo widely popular among Gujaratis, and it is now commonly played during Navratri and at many wedding celebrations. A Sanedo topic can be anything from romance or youth to satire.

Sanedo originated from the villages of the Patan district in Gujarat and it has become a very popular dance all over Gujarat and also among the Gujarati speaking population in other parts of India, United States, Australia, Canada and Britain. It is frequently played during the festival of Navratri, wedding celebrations and parties.

The music played in the background during a Sanedo recital is from a musical instrument called daklu. It is similar in shape to a damaru but is considerably larger.

== In popular culture ==
- Made in China, 2019 Hindi language film features a variation of Sanedo.
- Mitron, 2018 Hindi language film features a variation of Sanedo.
