= Mannara Chopra =

Indian actress (born 1991)

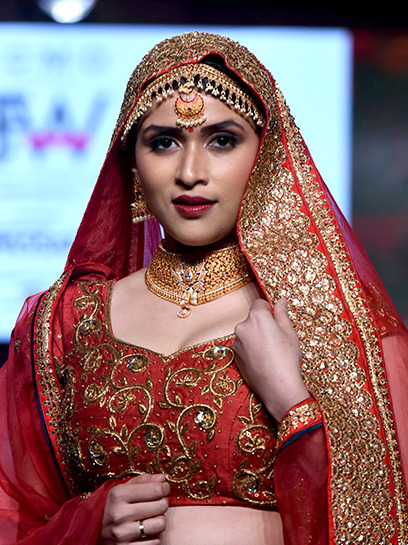
- Chopra in 2017
- Born: Barbie Handa; 29 March 1991 (age 35); Ambala, Haryana, India
- Occupations: Actress, model
- Years active: 2014–present
- Relatives: Chopra family

Mannara Chopra (born Barbie Handa) is an Indian actress and model who primarily works in Telugu and Hindi films and television. Chopra made her film debut with the romance Prema Geema Jantha Nai and Hindi debut with the thriller Zid, both in 2014. She later appeared in films such as Thikka, Rogue and Sita. In 2023, she participated in Bigg Boss 17.

== Early life and family ==
Mannara Chopra was born as Barbie Handa on 29 March 1991, in Ambala Cantonment, Haryana. She later changed her name to Mannara Chopra, on her cousin Priyanka's advice.

Her mother, Kamini Chopra Handa is a jewellery designer and her father Raman Rai Handa, was an advocate at Delhi High Court. She has a younger sister, Mitali Handa, who has studied commerce and is a fashion stylist.

Chopra completed her schooling at Summer Fields School, New Delhi, and later pursued a BBA degree. Actresses Priyanka Chopra, Parineeti Chopra and Meera Chopra are her maternal cousins.

== Career ==
=== Early work and debut (2012-2015) ===
After completing her education in Delhi, Chopra moved to Mumbai, where she started her career in modelling and moved into advertising. She acted in 40 commercials, Suzuki with Salman Khan, Dulux paints with Farhan Akhtar, Parle Marie with Imtiaz Ali, Myntra, three of them alongside her cousin Priyanka Chopra, including one for Dabur Amla, which she said won her "instant recognition" and landed her an offer in Telugu films. Chopra is the original face of Ganna commercial, and appeared in Amit Trivedi's song '"Bas Bajna Chahiye", the theme song for Gaana. Before making her film debut, she also worked as a fashion designer and as an assistant choreographer, being trained in dance forms like hip hop and belly dancing.

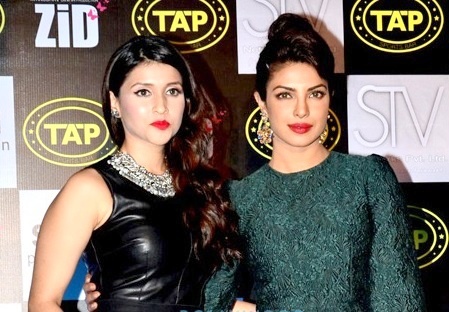
Chopra with her cousin Priyanka Chopra during the music success bash of the film Zid in 2014

By 2014, Mannara ventured into acting, signing up for films in Telugu, Tamil, Hindi and Kannada. Chopra made her acting debut with the Telugu film Prema Geema Jantha Nai (2014), then credited under her birth name, which featured her as a "very talkative college going girl" opposite Sreerama Chandra. The same year, Chopra made her Hindi debut with Anubhav Sinha's Zid, co-starring Karanvir Sharma. Her portrayal of an obsessive lover was met with mixed reviews. Mohar Basu of Koimoi called her "radiant" though noted that, she needed "a good deal more of experience". The film was a commercially profitable venture.

In 2015, Chopra had special appearance in a song in two Tamil films: Sandamarutham and Kaaval.

=== Career fluctuations (2016-2022) ===
Chopra made her comeback to Telugu films and had two releases in 2016. She first appeared opposite Sunil in Jakkanna, which was a hit at the box office. She also played the lead opposite Sai Dharam Tej in Thikka. The film was a commercial failure but won her the Special Jury Award at the 15th Santosham Film Awards.

Chopra made her Kannada film debut in 2017, with the bilingual Rogue, opposite Ishaan. She received another Special Jury Award at 16th Santosham Film Awards for the film. Chopra played Anjali, a woman threatened by a goon. Mukta Badipatla of Times of India stated that she "fits in her role perfectly". After a year-long hiatus, Chopra played Rupa, a personal assistant in Sita in 2019. Hemanth Kumar of Firstpost said that Chopra had a "poorly written" part.

In 2021, Chopra played Niharika, a singer in the Hindi short film Haale Dil on Broken Notes, opposite Gautam Vig. In 2022, she played Gayi, one of the five friends in Hi Five - Fun and Gun. A reviewer of Times of India found her to be "fantastic" in the film.

=== Bigg Boss 17 and beyond (2023-present) ===
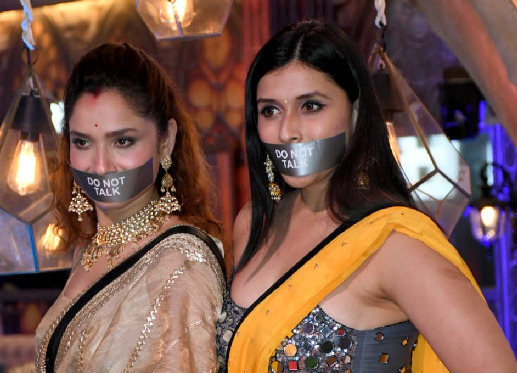
Chopra with Ankita Lokhande in Bigg Boss 17

From 2023 to 2024, Chopra appeared on the reality show Bigg Boss 17, marking her Hindi television debut. She became one of the highest-paid contestant of the season. Chopra emerged as the 2nd runner-up.

In 2023, Chopra also made her web debut with ALT Balaji's Bhootmate, in which she played a ghost Pari. Chopra will next appear in the Telugu film Thiragabadara Saami, opposite Raj Tarun and in the Punjabi film Ohi Chann Ohi Raatan.

== Other work and media image ==
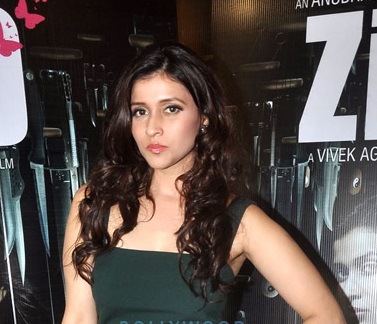
Chopra in 2014

Chopra was placed in the "35 most influential young Indians" list by GQ, in 2024.

In addition to her acting career, Chopra has appeared in various music videos such as Na Hona Tumse Door with Gajendra Verma, Ham Reh Gaye Akele with Pranav Vatsa and Sukoon with Ashmit Patel. Chopra also appeared as a showstopper for Ashima S at the 2017 India Runway Week. In 2023, Chopra made her singing debut with Zara Zara Behekta Hai. In 2024, Chopra appeared in the music video Saanware opposite Abhishek Kumar, her first project post Bigg Boss.

== Filmography ==
Key
†	Denotes films that have not yet been released

=== Films ===
Year	Title	Role	Language	Notes	Ref.
2014	Zid	Maya	Hindi		
2015	Sandamarutham	Herself	Tamil	Special appearance in a song	
2015	Kaaval	Herself	Tamil	Special appearance in a song	
2016	Jakkanna	Sahasraa	Telugu		
2016	Thikka	Virisha	Telugu		
2017	Rogue	Anjali	Telugu, Kannada	Bilingual film	
2019	Sita	Rupa	Telugu		
2021	Haale Dil on Broken Notes	Niharika	Hindi		
2022	Hi Five - Fun and Gun	Gayi	Telugu		
2024	Tiragabadara Saami	Radha	Telugu		
TBA	Ohi Chann Ohi Raatan †	TBA	Punjabi	Completed	

=== Television ===
Year	Title	Role	Notes	Ref.
2023–2024	Bigg Boss 17	Contestant	2nd runner-up	
2024	Dance Deewane 4	Herself	Guest appearance	
2025	Laughter Chefs – Unlimited Entertainment	Contestant	Season 2	

=== Web series ===
Year	Title	Role	Notes	Ref.
2023	Bhootmate	Pari		
2025	Ek Farzi Love Story	Manara	Special appearance	

=== Music videos ===
Year	Title	Singer(s)	Ref.
2021	Na Hona Tumse Door	Gajendra Verma	
2022	Ham Reh Gaye Akele	Pranav Vatsa	
2023	Sukoon	Kartikeya Tiwari	
2023	Zara Zara Behekta Hai	Mannara Chopra	
2024	Saanware	Akhil Sachdeva	
2024	Dheere Dheere	Payal Dev, Aditya Dev	
2024	Tera Kasoor	Vishal Mishra, Payal Dev	

== Awards ==
Year	Award	Category	Film	Result	Ref.
2015	Lions Gold Awards	Best Female Debut	Zid	Won	
2017	Santosham Film Awards	Best Actress – Special Jury Award	Thikka	Won	
2018	Santosham Film Awards	Best Actress – Special Jury Award	Rogue	Won	
