= Shaarib Sabri =

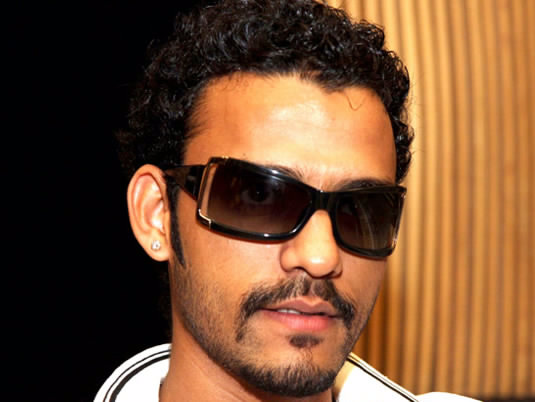
- Shaarib Sabri at recording of songs for the film Jail in 2009

Background information
- Born: Shaarib Sabri
- Genres: Film
- Occupations: Playback singer
- Instruments: Vocals, guitar
- Years active: 2007–present

Shaarib Sabri (born 29 December 1988) is an Indian playback singer and music composer who works in Hindi films.

== Personal life ==
Shaarib Sabri was born in Delhi, India but later moved to Jaipur, Rajasthan. Sabri's father is a classical Indian musician. Other singers in his family include his older brother Toshi Sabri, who was a contestant in the STAR Plus singing competition, Amul STAR Voice of India.

== Career ==
Sabri left in the middle of his 11th grade education to focus on a musical career. He was a finalist on Sa Re Ga Ma Pa Challenge 2005 achieving 10th place by public votes and subsequently a runner-up with Banjyotsna Borgohain in Sa Re Ga Ma Pa Ek Main Aur Ek Tu. Sabri was a contestant on the show Junoon – Kuch Kar Dikhayenge on NDTV in the Bollywood Filmi Group. He has sung for movies like Raaz - The Mystery Continues in the rock version of "Maahi (Rock With Me)" with his brother Toshi Sabri. He was the music director for the Raaz – The Mystery Continues with his brother. Besides that, Shaarib has sung a song in the movie Summer of 2007. Sabri was a participant on the show Music Ka Maha Muqqabla on STAR Plus.

== Discography ==
=== As playback singer ===
Denotes films that have not yet been released

Year	Film	Songs	Composer	Language	Lyricist	Co-singer(s)	Notes	
2008	Summer 2007	"Jaage Hain Baad Muddat Ke"	Gourav Dasgupta	Hindi	Vibha Singh	Toshi Sabri		
2010	Jail	"Milke Yun Laga"	Shaarib Sabri, Toshi Sabri	Hindi	A. M. Turaz, Shaarib Sabri			
2010	Jail	"Saiyaan Ve" (Rock Version)	Shaarib Sabri, Toshi Sabri	Hindi	Toshi Sabri	Toshi Sabri, Neil Nitin Mukesh		
2010	Veer	"Kanha (Thumari)"	Sajid–Wajid	Hindi	Gulzar	Rekha Bhardwaj, Toshi Sabri, Shabab Sabri		
2013	Ameerin Aadhi Bhagavan	"Oru Thuli Vishamai"	Yuvan Shankar Raja	Tamil	Snehan	Shreya Ghoshal		
2014	Nee Jathaga Nenundali	"Premante Emito (Aasan Nahi Yahan)"	Jeet Gannguli	Telugu	Chandrabose		Telugu remake of the song "Aasan Nahi Yahan" from Aashiqui 2	
2014	Zid	"Tu Zaroori (Male)"	Shaarib Sabri, Toshi Sabri	Hindi	Shakeel Azmi			
2014	Zid	"Tu Zaroori"	Shaarib Sabri, Toshi Sabri	Hindi	Shakeel Azmi	Sunidhi Chauhan		
2014	Zid	"Mareez-e-Ishq"	Shaarib Sabri, Toshi Sabri	Hindi	Shakeel Azmi	Arijit Singh		
2015	Pyaar Ka Punchnama 2	"Sharabi"	Shaarib Sabri, Toshi Sabri	Hindi	Late Akram Sabri, Kumaar, Danish Sabri	Toshi Sabri, Raja Hasan		
2016	1920: London	"Aj Ro Len De"	Shaarib Sabri, Toshi Sabri	Hindi	Shaarib Sabri, Toshi Sabri, Kalim Sheikh			
2016	Housefull 3	"Pyaar Ki"	Shaarib Sabri, Toshi Sabri	Hindi	Manoj Yadav, Farhad-Sajid, Danish Sabri	Toshi Sabri, Nakash Aziz, Divya Kumar, Anmol Malik, Earl Edgar		
2018	Saanson Ki Maala – Single	"Saanson Ki Maala"	Shaarib Sabri, Toshi Sabri	Hindi	Meera Bai	Hindi		Toshi Sabri

== As composer with Toshi Sabri ==
=== Film ===
Denotes films that have not yet been released

Year	Film	Notes
2009	Raaz - The Mystery Continues	
2009	Jashn	
2009	Jail	
2011	Lanka	
2012	Ghost	
2013	Yamla Pagla Deewana 2	
2013	Jackpot	
2014	Humpty Sharma Ki Dulhania	
2014	Zid	
2015	Pyaar Ka Punchnama 2	
2015	I Love Desi	
2016	Great Grand Masti	
2016	Housefull 3	
2016	1920: London	
2016	Veerappan	
2017	Fukrey Returns	
2018	Dil Juunglee	
2018	Mitron	
2019	Bypass Road	
2019	Hume Tumse Pyaar Kitna	
2024	Kaagaz 2	
2024	Madgaon Express	

=== Singles ===
- Saanson Ki Mala (2018)
- Dilla Ther Jaa (2019)
