= Lanka (2011 film) =

- Theatrical release poster
- Directed by: Maqbool Khan
- Story by: Shashank Dabral
- Produced by: Vikram Bhatt
- Starring: Manoj Bajpayee; Arjan Bajwa; Tia Bajpai
- Music by: Shaarib-Toshi; Gaurav Dagaonkar; Rishabh Shrivastava
- Distributed by: BVG Films; ASA Productions and Enterprises Pvt. Ltd.
- Release date: 20 October 2011
- Running time: 107 minutes
- Country: India
- Language: Hindi

Lanka is a 2011 Indian drama-thriller film directed by Maqbool Khan and produced by Vikram Bhatt under BVG Films associating ASA Production and Enterprises Pvt. Ltd.The film stars Manoj Bajpayee, Arjan Bajwa and Tia Bajpai in the lead roles. It was released on 20 October 2011.

== Plot ==
Lanka is a modern take on the Ramayana with Sita's life being saved by Vibhishan (Raavan's brother) from Raavan.

The movie "Lanka" begins in the present day Mumbai with Anju narrating about her past. Jaswant Sisodia is the don of a small town in UP, India called Bijnor. He rules the place and the police and politicians support him. He is in love with Anju, a doctor. Her father is the Chief Medical Officer of Bijnor. Anju is actually sexually exploited by Sisodia. Every night after taking drinks, he comes to her house and sleeps with her. She tries to commit suicide but her father stops her. She tries to run away but the house is guarded by Sisodia's men. Her father tries to meet the cops but they don't want to entertain him. Also, we never know how Anju became Sisodia's mistress.

The story takes a turn when Chhote enters Sisodia's house. He is Sisodia's mentor's son and Sisodia loves him like his own brother. Chhote sees Anju and from the very moment gets attracted to her. He asks Sisodia who she is, but he gets no reply. Later, Sisodia tells him to take care of a property near the town. When he goes there, he is beaten up the nearby villagers who claim the land is theirs. Wounded, he fights back later at dawn, killing seven people. Sisodia slaps him for the murders but then loves him and sees to it that he is left off by the court as innocent. Because of this, the villagers and the local cop, Sr Supdt of Police Bhup Singh start making a plan to kill Sisodia.

Meanwhile, Anju goes along with Chhote for her master's exams. After the exams, she requests him to kill her but he tells her that one needs courage to live and not to die. Slowly he starts to fall in love with her. With an inner fight between the right and the wrong, loyalty and empathy, he leaves Sisodia's house and comes and stays at his place. Sisodia, drunk and hurt comes to meet him, fights with him and when he's about to leave, he is shot by an assassin (sent by the cop and villagers). Chhote then protects Sisodia from the firing but gets shot in the back. Sisodia saves his life by taking him to the hospital and vows to take revenge.

In the meantime, Anju who works in the same hospital starts to fall in love with Chhote. Also, Anju's father has now joined hands with a crime branch officer of Lucknow Tyagi and files a case against Sisodia. Then Sisodia starts taking revenge by killing all the people involved and it ends by Chhote, who is discharged from the hospital killing the SSP in front of Sisodia.

Sisodia learns that Anju's father has filed a case against him. He along with Chhote takes him to a brothel and warns him to withdraw the case otherwise he'll make her into a prostitute and sell her in Dubai. Chhote is shocked to hear and Anju's father, who is unable to bear the shock and grief, commits suicide after reaching home.

Chhote, realizing that he has seen enough, goes to the crime branch officer Tyagi and files a case against Sisodia. The crime branch officer tells him that he would be termed a traitor by some and righteous by others but whatever he's doing is correct. Sisodia learns about Chhote's change of mind and in the night as Chhote and Anju are leaving Bijnor on their mobike, he confronts and stops them. Chhote tells him that he is wrong and needs to leave Anju. As Chhote turns and moves towards his bike, Sisodia shoots Chhote. But after shooting him, he realizes his mistake and goes towards Chhote. Chhote dies in Sisodia's arms. Sisodia then looks upwards to see that Anju is pointing the gun towards him. He begs her to shoot him as he cannot live without Chhote. She shoots him to death.

The movie ends with Anju thanking Chhote for saving her life and mentions that Ram is not required every time to save Sita's life. A Vibhishan is enough.

== Cast ==
- Manoj Bajpayee as Jaswant Sisodia
- Arjan Bajwa as Chhote
- Tia Bajpai as Dr Anju
- Yashpal Sharma as SSP Bhup Singh
- Manish Choudhary as Crime Branch Officer Tyagi
- Chandra Bhushan Singh as Ranveer Singh
- Yatin Karyekar as CMO and Anju's father
- Shweta Salve in a special appearance in item number "Hai Rama Rama"

== Soundtrack ==
The album features 6 tracks composed by Shaarib-Toshi, Gaurav Dagaonkar and Rishabh Shrivastava.

#	Song	Singer(s)	Music director	Music label
1	"Iltija"	Rishabh Shrivastava	Rishabh Shrivastava	T-Series; Sangeet Music
2	"Aap Ki Aahat"	Sonu Nigam	Shaarib-Toshi	T-Series; Sangeet Music
3	"Sheet Leher"	Shreya Ghoshal	Gaurav Dagaonkar	T-Series; Sangeet Music
4	"Barham Hai Hum"	KK	Gaurav Dagaonkar	T-Series; Sangeet Music
5	"Tu Hai Tu (Qabool)"	Toshi Sabri	Shaarib-Toshi	T-Series; Sangeet Music
6	"Sheet Leher"-II	Tia Bajpai	Gaurav Dagaonkar	T-Series; Sangeet Music
7	"Hai Rama Rama"	Sunidhi Chauhan	Shaarib-Toshi	T-Series; Sangeet Music

== Reception ==
Lanka opened to mixed response from critics as well as public. Taran Adarsh from Bollywood Hungama rated it 2/5 and added "Lanka has some shining moments." At the box office, the film had a poor opening, as it faced tough competition from other strong releases The Dirty Picture and Ladies vs Ricky Bahl. \

== Accolades ==
Award Ceremony	Category	Recipient	Result	Ref.(s)
4th Mirchi Music Awards	Upcoming Female Vocalist of The Year	Tia Bajpai - "Sheet Leher"	Won	
4th Mirchi Music Awards	Upcoming Lyricist of The Year	Seema Saini - "Sheet Leher"	Won	
