= Ghost (2012 film) =

- Theatrical Poster
- Directed by: Puja Jatinder Bedi
- Written by: shoaib ali
- Produced by: Bharat Shah
- Starring: Shiney Ahuja; Sayali Bhagat; Julia Bliss
- Cinematography: S. Bharathwaj
- Music by: Songs; Shaarib Sabri; Toshi Sabri; Background Score: Raju Singh
- Production companies: Owl Village Films Pvt. Ltd; Mega Bollywood Pvt. Ltd.
- Release date: 13 January 2012
- Running time: 118 minutes
- Country: India
- Language: Hindi

Ghost is a 2012 Indian horror film written and directed by Puja Jatinder Bedi, starring Shiney Ahuja and Sayali Bhagat in the lead roles and features Russian actress Julia Bliss who makes her Bollywood debut. Ghost was released on 13 January 2012 and was critically panned, although the performance of Sayali Bhagat was well praised. The film performed moderately well at the Indian box office.

The story follows Sayali Bhagat as a doctor and Shiney Ahuja as a detective who together investigate strange happenings inside a hospital. The film was given an A certificate because of its extremely violent content and due to this, the film also landed into several controversies and criticisms, resulting in some scenes being edited and trimmed by the Indian censor board.

== Plot ==
The film starts with a ghost, roaming with cockroaches on her whole body. Doctor Saxena, is brutally murdered by the ghost (Mary), who pulls his heart out of his body. His murder is followed by the murder of a nurse in the same hospital at the same time—3:00 am. Investigator Vijay is assigned the duty of finding the killer. During his investigation, Vijay meets Dr. Suhani, who was the first one to find the body of the nurse.

Suhani believes that something supernatural is committing the murders, but Vijay doesn't believe her theory. Another doctor of the hospital is murdered the same way, followed by the murder of an office boy by a lady, who was helping doctors in the operation theatre a few minutes before his death. It is then revealed that one more person – a hospital intern, Mary has been missing. Vijay also discovers that he suffered from memory loss, which was the outcome of an accident he had some time ago. However, he remembers that he and Mary were together in an adventure show before he suffered the accident.

Suhani maintains that there is a supernatural spirit who is not being addressed. Though Vijay continues not to believe her, he finally starts seeing visions from his past that help him recover his lost memory. It is then revealed that Mary was the girl Vijay was in love with. The two had gotten married in a church after Vijay's father gave permission. Just as the two left the church, they were attacked by a group of unknown men. Vijay tried to fight back, but was hit on the head by a rod, leading to his partial memory loss.

Mary was then horribly beaten, brutally assaulted and crucified by those men and left for dead. After being found by two men, she was taken to the city hospital, where she was eventually declared dead. However, her heart continued to beat, baffling the doctors. Because she was an international citizen, there was a huge outcry by the media and the Australian embassy. Finally, the doctors felt that she was unholy and had her chopped into pieces by a local butcher, bagged her remains and tossed her into the sea.

After remembering everything, Vijay discovers that his father was behind all this. His father was against the marriage and had bribed the attackers, doctors, wardboy and nurse to murder Mary. Angered and heartbroken, Vijay confronts his father. His father tries to escape but is finally killed by Mary, along with all the other attackers who had killed Mary, as well as the butcher. With her revenge finally complete, Mary finds solace in Jesus's arms because of her never-dying faith and belief.

== Cast ==
- Shiney Ahuja as Vijay Singh
- Sayali Bhagat as Dr. Suhani
- Deepraj Rana as Dr.Saxena
- Julia Bliss as Mary Madgeline
- Tej Sapru as Mr. Singh
- Sandip Soparrkar in Special Appearance
- Gulshan Rana
- Tabrez Khan
- Bijayata Pradhan as Nurse Liya

== Reception ==
=== Critical reception ===
Ghost was critically panned by critics. Taran Adarsh of Bollywood Hungama rated the film 1.5/5 stars saying "The problem with Ghost is that the scares are scarce, despite some twists and turns injected in the plotline. Regrettably, the story goes for a toss thanks to the interrupting song and dance routine". He did praise the lead cast and said "Both Shiney and Sayali strive hard to keep your interest alive but the scares in Ghost are inadequate and ineffectual". Nikhat Kazmi from The Times of India gave the film 1/5 stars stating that "Once you realise there's nothing much in store in terms of the hebbie jebbies, you turn to the story, Equally unpromising". Mansha Rastogi of nowrunning.com also gave the film 1/5 stars and said "A hackneyed story-line, hamming actors and unintentionally ludicrous scenes, Ghost makes for a horrific horror film, Best unseen".

Rajeev Masand from IBN Live gave it 0.5/5 and said "Ghost is a staggeringly silly film. It's utterly and entirely painful and tiring to sit through". Shubhra Gupta from The Indian Express also rated it 0.5/5 while saying "The only way to get through it is to see the funny side of it all, and laugh the ghastliness away". Blessy Chettiar of Daily News and Analysis gave it 0/5 stars saying "If adventure is your thing, go on, have a good laugh but don't complain you weren't warned".

=== Box office ===
Ghost got a wide release due to the popular horror genre and opened to around 850 theatres with plenty of single screens. However it opened to a slow start grossing only 5 million on the first day, although it did score over all the other releases (Sadda Adda, Chaalis Chauraasi and Tutiya Dil). Collections dropped on Saturday, but the film still managed to gross 15.0 million nett over its first weekend. Ghost found strong audiences at single screens, in places like Gujarat, Maharashtra, UP and Berar. Even though it did decent first weekend business, Ghost remained below par throughout its first week, altogether it collected around 53.5 million nett. In its second week Ghost grossed 12.3 million nett, taking the total collections of the film to 85.0 million nett. It was declared "Flop" by Boxoffice-India.

== Controversy ==
The film was involved in several controversies pre-release regarding the rape case of Shiney Ahuja. The most notable controversy came when several scenes of the film were cut down and trimmed by the Indian censor board as they felt the scenes were violent enough for Ghost to be rated as the most violent Hindi film ever. One particular scene depicted a woman being crucified like Jesus Christ which the censor board felt would hurt the religious sentiments of the Christian community, they also felt that the violence on the woman was too excessive. The director was not happy that a pivotal scene had been cut.

== Soundtrack ==
#	Title	Singer(s)
1	"Jalwanuma"	Toshi Sabri, Akram Sabri
2	"Aaja Khatam Sabr"	Sunidhi Chauhan
3	"Salame Salame"	Shaan, Shaarib Sabri
4	"Dil Ke Liye"	Javed Ali
5	"Kahan Hai Tu"	Faiz Shk

== See also ==
- List of ghost films
