= Mitron =

2018 Hindi romantic comedy film

- Theatrical release poster
- Directed by: Nitin Kakkar
- Written by: Sharib Hashmi
- Based on: Pelli Choopulu by Tharun Bhascker
- Produced by: Vikram Malhotra
- Starring: Jackky Bhagnani; Kritika Kamra; Pratik Gandhi
- Cinematography: Manoj Kumar Khatoi
- Edited by: Sachindra Vats
- Music by: Songs: Tanishk Bagchi; Yo Yo Honey Singh; Vayu; Sameer Uddin; Lijo George-DJ Chetas; Shaarib-Toshi; Abhishek Nailwal; Background Score: Sameer Uddin
- Production company: Abundantia Entertainment
- Release date: 14 September 2018
- Country: India
- Language: Hindi
- Box office: ₹38.5 million

Mitron (transl. Friends) is a 2018 Indian Hindi-language romantic comedy film directed by Nitin Kakkar, written by Sharib Hashmi, and produced by Vikram Malhotra under the Abundantia Entertainment banner. An official remake of the 2016 Telugu film Pelli Choopulu, it stars Jackky Bhagnani with Kritika Kamra and Pratik Gandhi. Set in the Gujarati milieu, the film traces the journey of Jay and Avni, as they set out on the path of finding themselves amidst their social and cultural backgrounds. The film was released on 14 September 2018 and marked Bhagnani's final acting credit.

== Plot ==
Jay's father is not happy with Jay's relaxed approach to life and so, in an attempt to get him to mature, he arranges for him to meet a girl with an eye for marriage. Unfortunately, Jay's father gets the address wrong and they end up at Avni's house. Avni also happens to be expecting a boy. Both families send the couple upstairs to see if they like each other and by accident, Jay ends up locking them in along with Avni's young cousin. From hereon ensues a chain of circumstances that will change their lives forever.

== Cast ==
- Jackky Bhagnani as Jay Patel
- Kritika Kamra as Avni Gandhi
- Pratik Gandhi as Raunak
- Prateik Babbar as Vikram
- Perlene Bhersaina as Richa
- Neeraj Sood as Jay's Father
- Shivam Parekh as Deepak "Deepu”
- Mohan Kapoor as Richa’s father
- Bimal Trivedi

== Production ==
It is a remake of the 2016 Telugu film Pelli Choopulu. The film was shot in various cities of Gujarat including Ahmedabad, Surat, Vadodara and Siddhpur.

== Soundtrack ==
Mitron

Soundtrack album by Tanishk Bagchi, Yo Yo Honey Singh, Vayu, Sameer Uddin, Lijo George-DJ Chetas, Shaarib-Toshi and Abhishek Nailwal
- Released: 30 August 2018
- Genre: Feature film soundtrack
- Length: 26:42
- Language: Hindi
- Labels: Sony Music India; Saregama (Chalte Chalte)

Tanishk Bagchi chronology
Satyameva Jayate (2018)	Mitron (2018)	Loveratri (2018)

Yo Yo Honey Singh chronology
Sonu Ke Titu Ki Sweety (2018)	Mitron (2018)	Baazaar (2018)

Shaarib-Toshi chronology
Dil Juunglee (2018)	Mitron (2018)

DJ Chetas-Lijo George chronology
Golmaal Again (2017)	Mitron (2018)	Loveyatri (2018)

Sameer Uddin chronology
Kaalakaandi (2018)	Mitron (2018)	Junglee (2019)

Tanishk Bagchi, Yo Yo Honey Singh, Vayu, Sameer Uddin, Lijo George-DJ Chetas, Shaarib-Toshi and Abhishek Nailwal composed the soundtrack of the film. Yo Yo Honey Singh, Atif Aslam, Darshan Raval, Jubin Nautiyal, Sonu Nigam, Nikhita Gandhi, Bappi Lahiri and Raja Hasan rendered their voice for the soundtrack of the film. Lyrics are written by Hommie Dilliwala, Vayu, Tanishk Bagchi, Kumaar, Kalim Shaikh and Akshay Verma.

Bagchi recreated the song "Chalte Chalte Yoon Hi Koi" from the 1972 film Pakeezah, in the voice of Atif Aslam. He was criticized by many people, including Lata Mangeshkar, the singer of the original song. The song Sanedo is inspired by Gujarati folk style, Sanedo.

Track listing
No.	Title	Lyrics	Music	Singer(s)	Length
1.	"This Party Is Over Now"	Hommie Dilliwala	Yo Yo Honey Singh	Yo Yo Honey Singh	3:35
2.	"Sawarne Lage"	Tanishk Bagchi	Tanishk Bagchi	Jubin Nautiyal	2:47
3.	"Chalte Chalte"	Tanishk Bagchi	Tanishk Bagchi	Atif Aslam	2:56
4.	"Kamariya"	Kumaar	Lijo George-DJ Chetas	Darshan Raval, Rap by: Ikka	4:35
5.	"Door Na Ja"	Kalim Shaikh	Shaarib-Toshi	Sonu Nigam	3:45
6.	"Sanedo"	Vayu	Tanishk Bagchi, Vayu	Darshan Raval, Raja Hasan	2:38
7.	"Sawarne Lage" (Female Version)	Tanishk Bagchi	Tanishk Bagchi	Nikhita Gandhi	2:47
8.	"Ghar Ke Hain Na Ghat Ke"	Akshay Verma	Sameer Uddin, Abhishek Nailwal	Bappi Lahiri, Sameer Uddin, Abhishek Nailwal	3:39
Total length:					26:42
