= Zid (2014 film) =

2014 Indian Hindi Erotic Thriller film directed by Vivek Agnihotri

- First Look Poster
- Directed by: Vivek Agnihotri
- Written by: Vivek Agnihotri; Rohit Malhotra
- Produced by: Anubhav Sinha
- Starring: Karanvir Sharma; Mannara Chopra; Shraddha Das; Seerat Kapoor; Denzil Smith
- Cinematography: Yash Bhatt
- Music by: Shaarib–Toshi
- Production company: Benaras Media Works
- Release date: 28 November 2014
- Country: India
- Language: Hindi
- Budget: ₹8.3 crore
- Box office: ₹14.15 crore

Zid (transl. Obstinance) is a 2014 Indian Hindi-language thriller film directed by Vivek Agnihotri and produced by Anubhav Sinha. The film stars Karanvir Sharma, Mannara Chopra and Shraddha Das in the principal roles.

== Plot ==
Rohan "Ronnie" Achrekar, a crime reporter with a Goa-based newspaper called The Daily, is being questioned by his newspaper's editor Karan and the area's deputy superintendent of police. He tells them that with the editor's help, he had rented an apartment in his friend's outhouse located in a remote part of Goa. The place looks haunted and the owner is a paralysed, elderly man who uses a wheelchair and is the father of a young girl, Maya. Maya falls in love upon seeing Ronnie, who is recovering from his break-up with ex-girlfriend Priya, who moved to London.

Maya phones her sister to reveal her feelings for Ronnie and steals a picture of Ronnie out of his photo-frame. She also spots picture of herself on his desktop, and this makes her think that he is likewise in love with her. This is not the case. It was only by chance that Ronnie had snapped the picture during his ferry ride while travelling to the new place, before he had even met her. Ronnie is not in love with her, but still he plans a date-night at a nightclub. There, he bumps into Nancy, Priya's step-sister. Maya is upset when Ronnie and Nancy dance together.

On their way back from the nightclub, Ronnie drives drunk and their SUV collides with a scooter driven by Nancy. Nancy falls off the road and rolls down a slope. Ronnie panics, while Maya, a trained nurse, rushes to save the girl. Maya announces that Nancy is dead, and persuades Ronnie to flee the scene so that they can avoid getting caught.

The next morning, Nancy is found dead, the accident is all over the news, and the Goan police are on the case. Ronnie, while all the time afraid that he might be caught, finds himself involved in the case in strange ways. For one thing, Priya comes back to India from London to hunt for Nancy's killers. Then again, as a journalist, Ronnie is ordered by Karan to go to the crash site and report on all aspects of the incident. He does as he is told, and during his work, he meets Inspector Moses, who suspects that Priya killed Nancy for her share of the family inheritance and that Ronnie is Priya's partner-in-crime. Meanwhile, Maya continues to protect Ronnie. Ronnie had told his boss that his SUV is in the garage (for repairs), but Maya dumps it in a lake so that no one can trace it. She even takes him to the spot and shows him the immersed SUV in the lake.

Investigations reveal that Nancy would have lived even after she was hit by the car, but someone had strangled her. Priya visits Ronnie at his outhouse and requests him to help her find the murderer. On her return trip, her brakes fail and she crashes, but is not hurt. Soon, Priya and Ronnie warm up to each other again. Ronnie even excuses himself from Maya's birthday dinner so that he can spend the night with Priya. Maya then finds out from Ronnie's office that he is not there but is with Priya. Maya stalks them and finds Ronnie and Priya having sex. Before sneaking out, an angry Maya feeds Ronnie's pet puppy Bobby to her pet alligator.

Priya finds out that Ronnie had been at the same bar and that he had even met Nancy the night she was killed. She feels betrayed. Priya also becomes suspicious of Maya, lands up at the outhouse and starts accusing Maya of everything – including Nancy's murder. They get into a brawl. Maya calls Ronnie for help. Ronnie arrives but she attacks him on the head from behind and he suffers a black-out. Maya rushes to leave but finds Inspector Moses outside and kills him after he voices his suspicions that she is responsible for Nancy's death. Ronnie wakes up and discovers a cabin with pictures of Maya, himself, Nancy, Priya, Moses, and even Bobby on the walls, with red crosses on those who are now dead. Maya reappears and reveals her role in the murders. She also tells him that she had previously killed her own sister by pushing her from the boat in a lake in a fit of jealousy.

Maya then blindfolds Ronnie and takes him to the top of a lighthouse that she called Maya's Kingdom to exchange wedding vows with him. She tells him to make love to her and he obliges. All this while, Priya is dangling in mid-air on a suspended chair. Ronnie lights a cigarette and spills a glass of wine over it causing a fire. Maya pulls the gun on him but Ronnie snatches the gun from her hand, which he could have done earlier too, and throws her off the lighthouse, leaving her dangling from the rod along with Priya. Ronnie manages to pull Priya on top of the lighthouse and saves her. After that they both try to save Maya, but she lets go and falls to her death into the deep waters.

The DSP is convinced by Ronnie's story and tells him that he will be out on bail. In return, the editor promises to use the paper's good relations with a government minister to stop the DSP's upcoming transfer.

After the DSP and editor leaves, Ronnie starts laughing, and the film goes into a flashback where everything supposedly done by Maya is shown to have been done by Ronnie. It is revealed that it was Priya and Ronnie's plan to kill Nancy and get all property and put all blame on Maya, and that she truly loved him.

== Cast ==
- Karanvir Sharma as Rohan "Ronnie" Achrekar
- Mannara Chopra as Maya
- Shraddha Das as Priya
- Seerat Kapoor as Nancy
- Denzil Smith as Inspector Moses
- Mohan Kapoor as Newspaper Editor and Rohan's friend Karan
- Rajeev Saxena as DSP of Goa Police
- Sanjay Kapoor as Psychiatrist
- Satish Barwe as Maya's disabled father
- Harsh Murthi(Niks Indian) as Singer in the song "Mareez-E-Ishq" in a friendly appearance
- Libert as Police Office in police station
- Indal Raja as witness
- Apoorva as young Maya
- Archis Achrekar as electrician
- Ben as Father in the graveyard
- Vitesh as ferry owner

== Production ==
On 13 November 2013 it was reported that Mannara would make her debut in the film alongside Karanvir Sharma. On 23 October 2014 reports suggested that film's director Vivek Agnihotri had walked out of the project, due to creative differences. Though Agnihotri confirmed the reports as being true, producer of the film Anubhav Sinha denied the fall-out stating that "Vivek Agnihotri is very much a part of the film". On 27 October 2014 it was reported that Handa rechristened herself as Mannara for the film.

== Release ==
The film had a worldwide release date of 28 November 2014.

The first look poster of the film was released on 20 October 2014, followed by the second poster on 27 October 2014. The film was promoted with the tagline 'Come play with fire'. Upon release, the trailer received over a million views in YouTube within 4 days.

== Reception ==
Madhureeta Mukherjee, reviewing for The Times of India rated it one and a half stars out of five and criticised the story-line, noting it to be filled with forgettable performances and screaming flaws. Nishi Tewari at Rediff.com gave half star out of five deeming it as an entirely botched and idiotic tale with grossly poor performances.

== Music ==
Music for the film is given by Sharib Sabri and Toshi Sabri, while the lyrics are written by Shakeel Azmi. First single from the film titled "Saanson Ko" sung by Arijit Singh was released on 31 October 2014. Second single titled "Tu Zaroori" sung by Sunidhi Chauhan and Sharib Sabri was released on 10 November 2014. Full album was released on 13 November 2014.

Track listing
No.	Title	Singer(s)	Length
1.	"Tu Zaroori"	Sunidhi Chauhan, Sharib Sabri	4:51
2.	"Saanson Ko"	Arijit Singh	4:46
3.	"Mareez-E-Ishq"	Arijit Singh	4:50
4.	"Zid"	Sunidhi Chauhan	6:03
5.	"Tu Zaroori (Male)"	Sharib Sabri	4:51
6.	"Chahun Tujhe Khud Se Siva"	Sunidhi Chauhan (Female)	5:09
Total length:			29:10

== Box office ==
Zid performed moderately well at the box office by collecting 140 million in India on an estimated 100 million budget.

== Awards and nominations ==
Award	Category	Recipients and nominees	Result	Ref.
7th Mirchi Music Awards	Best Song Engineer (Recording & Mixing)	Aditya Chakravarty & Abhishek Ghatak – "Tu Zaroori"	Nominated	
Lions Gold Awards	Best Female Debut	Mannara Chopra – Zid	Won	
