= Jackpot (2013 film) =

2013 Indian film by Kaizad Gustad

- Theatrical release poster
- Directed by: Kaizad Gustad
- Written by: Kaizad Gustad; Amol Parashar
- Produced by: Raina Sachiin Joshi; Anil Thadani
- Starring: Naseeruddin Shah; Sunny Leone; Bharath; Sachiin J Joshi
- Cinematography: Artur Zurawski
- Music by: Shaarib–Toshi
- Production companies: Viiking Media & Entertainment; AA Films
- Release date: 13 December 2013
- Country: India
- Language: Hindi
- Box office: ₹50 million (US$530,000)

Jackpot is a 2013 Indian Hindi-language comedy thriller film directed by Kaizad Gustad starring Sunny Leone, Naseeruddin Shah, Sachiin J Joshi, and Bharath in the lead roles. This is the Bollywood debut of Tamil actor Bharath. The film was released on 13 December 2013 to highly negative reviews. It had total earnings of ₹50 million (US$530,000), according to Box Office India.

== Premise ==
A group of swindlers in Goa devise a plan to con the rich at a card game in a casino and risk everything just to get caught in a web of their own making.

== Cast ==
- Naseeruddin Shah as Boss
  - He is a veteran raver whose clothes are as colorful as his principles and punchlines. Slow in speech but quick to draw a six-shooter, he owns the Jackpot casino.
- Sunny Leone as Maya
- Sachiin J Joshi as Francis
  - He packs in the muscle and has a can of beer always close at hand. He is also street-smart enough to impress Maya, the oomphy voice of reason in the movie.
- Bharath as Anthony D’Souza
- Makrand Deshpande
- Manish Wadhwa
- Sumit Kumar
- Daniel Weber (cameo)

== Filming ==
The majority of the shooting for the film was completed in Goa. Kaizad Gustad shot the film in 27 days.

== Soundtrack ==
The soundtrack has 9 tracks. Sharib & Toshi, Mika, Remo Fernandes, Gods Robots (Shridevi Keshavan & Janaka Atugoda), Rishi Rich, Juno Reactor, Rahul Bhatt, Jaaved Jaaferi and Itek Bhutani composed one song each. The song "Kabhi Jo Baadal Barse" became popular.

=== Track listing ===
Song Title – Performed by – Music by – Lyrics by

1. Kabhi Jo Baadal Barse – Arijit Singh – Sharib & Toshi – Turaz & Azeem Shirazi
2. Full Jhol – Mika Singh, Akasa Singh – Mika Singh – Raj Hans
3. Bol Bugger Bol – Remo Fernandes – Remo Fernandes – Abhijeet Deshpande
4. Jackpot Jeetna – Sunidhi Chauhan – Gods Robots – Kaizad Gustad
5. Kabhi Jo Baadal Barse (Remix) – Arijit Singh feat. Rishi Rich – Sharib & Toshi – Turaz & Azeem Shirazi
6. Jackpot – Hamsika Iyer – Juno Reactor – Kaizad Gustad
7. Eggjactly – Jaaved Jaaferi – Rahul Bhatt – Jaaved Jaaferi
8. Kabhi Jo Baadal Barse (Female) – Shreya Ghoshal – Sharib & Toshi – Turaz & Azeem Shirazi
9. Now You See, Now You Don't – Ramya Iyer – Itek Bhutani – Kaizad Gustad & Ramya Iyer
10. Kabhi Jo Baadal Barse (Remix) – Arijit Singh feat. Maxi Priest – Sharib & Toshi – Turaz & Azeem Shirazi

== Marketing ==
Censor Board axed the rap song 'Eggjactly' from the film as it was a bit vulgar, though the video of the song was released online. The premiere of Jackpot was held at PVR Cinemas in Juhu, Mumbai, on 12 December 2013 to which Shahrukh Khan, Urvashi Sharma and other celebrities came. Sunny Leone promoted the film in various cities like Gurgaon, Chandigarh, Kolkata, Mumbai, and Bangalore (Inorbit Mall). Sunny Leone and Sachin also promoted the film on the shows Bigg Boss 7 and Comedy Circus Ke Mahabali.

== Box office ==
Jackpot grossed ₹10 million (US$110,000) on day one. It grossed ₹34.5 million (US$360,000) on domestic box office in its first weekend. The film had a poor first week collection of ₹45 million (US$480,000).

== Critical reception ==
Reagan Gavin Rasquinha of Times of India gave Jackpot 2 stars out of 5. Shubhra Gupta of Indian Express gave the film a 1/2 star only. Avad M of Bollywood3 rated the film 1.5/5.
