= Toshi Sabri =

Indian singer and music composer

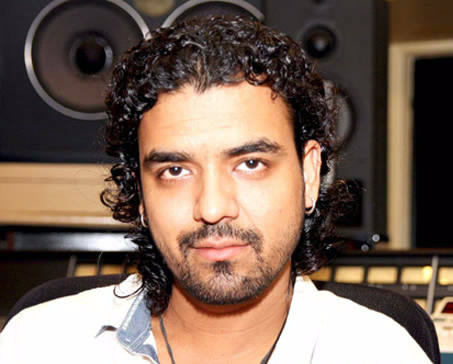
- Toshi Sabri at recording of songs for Jail in 2009

Background information
- Born: 4 July 1984 (age 41); Punjab, India
- Genres: Hindi songs (Orchestra, stage show), Bollywood Playback singer
- Occupations: Singer, Music Director
- Instrument: Vocals
- Years active: 2007–present

Toshi Sabri is an Indian singer and music composer. He gained fame with the song "Maahi" from the 2009 film Raaz: The Mystery Continues.

== Background ==
He appeared on Reality TV show singing contests Amul STAR Voice of India (Fourth Position), "Ustaadon Ka Ustaad" and "Jo Jeeta Wohi Super Star". His younger brother Sharib Sabri is also a singer.

== Discography ==
=== As singer ===
Denotes films that have not yet been released

Year	Film	Songs	Music Director	Co-Singers
2008	Summer 2007	Jaage Hain Baad Muddat Ke	Gourav Dasgupta	Shaarib Sabri
2009	Raaz - The Mystery Continues	Maahi, Maahi (Rock With Me)	Shaarib-Toshi	
2009	Jail	Sayian Ve	Shaarib-Toshi	
2009	Jail	Saiyaan Ve (Rock Version)	Shaarib-Toshi	Shaarib Sabri, Neil Nitin Mukesh Toshi
2009	Veer	Kanha (Thumari)	Sajid–Wajid	Rekha Bhardwaj, Shaarib Sabri, Shabab Sabri
2009	Oye!	Seheri	Yuvan Shankar Raja	Priya
2011	Lanka	Tu Hai Tu (Qabool)	Shaarib-Toshi	
2014	Humpty Sharma Ki Dulhania	Emotional Fool	Shaarib-Toshi	
2015	Pyaar Ka Punchnama 2	Sharabi	Shaarib-Toshi	Shaarib, Raja Hasan
2015	I Love Desi	Dil Ka Baje Ektara	Shaarib-Toshi	
2016	Veerappan	Khallas	Shaarib-Toshi	Jasmine Sandlas
2016	Veerappan	Veer Veer Veerappan	Shaarib-Toshi	Payal Dev, Vee
2016	Veerappan	Veer Veer Veerappan (Rap Version)	Shaarib-Toshi	Payal Dev, Vee
2016	Housefull 3	Pyaar Ki	Shaarib-Toshi	Shaarib Sabri, Nakash Aziz, Divya Kumar, Anmol Malik, Earl Edgar
2018	Single	Saanson Ki Maala	Shaarib-Toshi	Shaarib Sabri
2019	Single	Dilla Ther Jaa	Shaarib-Toshi	
2019	Hume Tumse Pyaar Kitna	Hashar Se Pehle	Shaarib-Toshi	

== As a music director with Shaarib Sabri ==
=== Film ===
Denotes films that have not yet been released

Year	Film	Songs
2009	Raaz - The Mystery Continues	Maahi, Maahi (Rock With me)
2009	Jashn	Aaya Re, Aish Karle, Nazrein Kahaan Soti Hain, Nazrein Kahaan Soti Hain (Kilogram Mix)
2009	Jail	Saiyaan ve, Milke Yun Laga, Saiyaan Ve (Rock Version)
2011	Lanka	Aap Ki Aahat, Barham Hai Hum, Tu Hai Tu (Qabool), Hai Rama Rama
2012	Ghost	All songs
2013	Yamla Pagla Deewana 2	All songs except for "Main Taan"
2013	Warning (composed without Shaarib)	Tell Me How Much, Chikadanga Chikadanga (DubStep)
2013	Jackpot	Kabhi Jo Baadal Barse, Kabhi Jo Baadal Barse (Female), Kabhi Jo Baadal Barse (Remix) feat. Rishi Rich
2014	Humpty Sharma Ki Dulhania	Saturday Saturday, Samjhawan, Emotional Fool, Samjhawan (Unplugged) (Saturday Saturday song with Badshah, The Titans)
2014	Zid	All songs
2015	Pyaar Ka Punchnama 2	Sharabi
2015	I Love Desi	All songs without Dheere Dheere
2016	Great Grand Masti	Resham Ka Rumaal
2016	Housefull 3	Pyar Ki
2016	1920: London	Aaj Ron Len De, Rotha Kyun, Tujhko Mein
2016	Veerappan	All Songs Except "Muchhi Re"
2017	Fukrey Returns	Ishq De Fanniyar (Male), Ishq De Fanniyar (Female)
2018	Dil Juunglee	Bandeya
2018	Mitron	Door Na Ja
2019	Bypass Road	Ishq Maine Paya
2019	Hume Tumse Pyaar Kitna	Hashar Se Pehle
2024	Kaagaz 2	All songs
2024	Madgaon Express	Raaton Ke Nazaare, Bohot Bhari, Not funny

=== Single ===
- Saanson Ki Mala (2018)
- Dilla Ther Ja (2019)
