= Kisi Ka Bhai Kisi Ki Jaan (soundtrack) =

2023 soundtrack album

- Soundtrack album cover

Soundtrack album by Himesh Reshammiya, Devi Sri Prasad, Ravi Basrur, Sajid Khan, Sukhbir, Payal Dev, and Amaal Mallik
- Released: 20 April 2023
- Recorded: 2022
- Studios: YRF Studios, Mumbai: HR Musik Studio, Mumbai; DSP Studio, Chennai
- Genre: Feature film soundtrack
- Length: 27:42
- Language: Hindi
- Label: Zee Music Company
- Producers: DJ Dips; Supernova Muzic; Ravi Basrur; Bharath VM; Sachin Basrur

Kisi Ka Bhai Kisi Ki Jaan is the soundtrack album to the 2023 Indian Hindi-language action comedy film of the same name, directed by Farhad Samji, starring Salman Khan and Pooja Hegde in the lead roles. The film was produced by Salman Khan Films. The soundtrack composed by Himesh Reshammiya, Devi Sri Prasad, Ravi Basrur, Sajid Khan, Sukhbir, Payal Dev, and Amaal Mallik.

The film featured eight tracks with lyrics written by Shabbir Ahmed, Kumaar, Devi Sri Prasad, Sajid KhanSajid Khan, Ravi Basrur, Vicky Sandhu, Kinnal Raj and Harini Ivaturi. The album was released by Zee Music Company on 20 April 2023, a day before the film's release.

The music received positive reception from critics and audience. The track "Naiyo Lagda" and "Billi Billi" created the record for reaching 40 million views, within 24 hours of its release. The tracks "Naiyo Lagda", "Billi Billi" and "Yentamma", topped the national charts, in all music and video platforms.

== Background ==
The film reportedly had multiple music composers for composing the songs. In April 2022, it was reported that Devi Sri Prasad was hired to compose song a song for the film. He was earlier collaborated with Khan for Ready (2011) and Radhe (2021). Prasanth composed a song in June which didn't impressed the Khan and he reportedly exited from the film. Ravi Basrur, who impressed Khan by his composition in KGF: Chapter 2 (2022) roped in to the project to score background score and to compose a song. This marks his second collaboration with Khan after Antim: The Final Truth (2021) and Basrur started composing the score in late June 2022. Prasad, however, denied the rumors, saying that he had already composed a dance number for the film. In July 2022, rapper Yo Yo Honey Singh and Prasad collaborated for a song, marking their first collaboration.

Actually, I had already cleared this confusion but it was never the whole album. It was never supposed to be mine because by the time they approached me, they already done couple of songs. But Farhad Samji told me the entire script for me to know because I want to know the vibe of like 'what they have done', 'what they didn't do', 'which part should I do?' But when he narrated, they were like a little more number of songs. But finally, because of the length of the film and all that, what he told me is the number of songs itself have been reduced.

— Devi Sri Prasad, on his composition in an interview with Bollywood Hungama.

Sukhbir revealed that Khan met him at Abu Dhabi and asked for a wedding song. When Sukhbir sent him "Billi Billi" which was written completely in Punjabi, Khan insisted him to use some Hindi lyrics and compose. Himesh Reshammiya, Sajid Khan, Payal Dev and Amaal Mallik have been signed to compose songs as well.

Shabbir Ahmed, Kumaar, Devi Sri Prasad, Sajid Khan, Ravi Basrur, Vicky Sandhu, Kinnal Raj and Harini Ivaturi were signed to write lyrics for the songs. The music rights were acquired by Zee Music Company.

== Composition ==
The first single, titled "Naiyo Lagda" composed by Himesh Reshammiya was sung by Kamaal Khan and Palak Muchhal, and written by Shabbir Ahmed. Reshammiya earlier collaborated with Khan in several projects.

The second single titled "Billi Billi" was composed and recorded by Punjabi musician Sukhbir. The song was written by Kumaar and Punjabi lyrics penned by Vicky Sandhu, and produced by DJ Dips and Supernova Muzic.

The film's third single "Jee Rahe The Hum (Falling in Love)" was sung by Salman Khan himself. This marks his return as a singer after eight years, following singing "Main Hoon Hero Tera" in 2015. The song composed by Amaal Malik had the lyrics penned by Shabbir Ahmed. The track was produced by Aditya Dev and Amaal Malik.

The fourth single "Bathukamma" was ode to the Telangana flower festival Bathukamma. It was composed by Ravi Basrur, who also produced the song along with Bharath VM and Sachin Basrur. The song's Hindi lyrics were penned by Shabbir Ahmed and Ravi Basrur, and Telugu lyrics were provided by Kinnal Raj and Harini Ivaturi. Vocals were provided by Santhosh Venky, Ravi Basrur, Aira Udupi, Harini Ivaturi, Suchetha Basrur and Vijayalaxmi Mettinahole. Manish Dinakar, Ravi Basrur, Ashok Sharma, Sai Charan Bhaskaruni, Lokeshwar Edara, Shrinath Komanduri, Saketh Komanduri provided, Supriya Ram, Arpitha Venu, Sony Komanduri, MI Gayatri, Abhikya, Shruthika Samudrala, Sangeetha Ravindra, Anvitha G Murthy, Akshatha Gangolli, Spoorthi Kundapura and Shreya Kanchugodu provided the additional vocals for the track.

The fifth single "Yentamma" composed by Payal Dev had lyrics written by Shabbir Ahmed and sung by Vishal Dadlani and Payal Dev. It has rap written and performed by Raftaar. Aditya Dev produced and provided additional lyrics and vocals.

The sixth single "O Balle Balle" was composed, recorded and produced by Sukhbir himself while the additional music was produced by DJ Harshit Shah. The lyrics of the Punjabi song was penned by Kumaar. Sukhbir revealed that Salman Khan write the additional lyrics of the song.

The seventh single "Lets Dance Chotu Motu" was composed and penned by Devi Sri Prasad, who also sang the song with Khan and Neha Bhasin. The tracks which used nursery rhymes had rap written and performed by Yo Yo Honey Singh. The eighth single composed and penned by Sajid Khan and sung by Sajid–Wajid.

== Marketing and release ==
The first single, titled "Naiyo Lagda"'s teaser was unveiled on 11 February 2023. The song was launched during the grand finale of Bigg Boss 16 on 12 February, and later on music platforms, coinciding Valentine's Day.

The second single's teaser was released on 1 March 2023. The song "Billi Billi" was released on 2 March. The third song "Jee Rahe The Hum"'s teaser was unveiled on 20 March, and song was released on 21 March, before the 30 days of the film's release. The next track "Bathukamma" was released on 31 March.

"Yentamma"'s teaser was released on 3 April 2023. The song was released on 4 April. "O Balle Balle" was released on 17 April. "Lets Dance Chotu Motu" was unveiled on 18 April. The eighth single "Tere Bina" was released on 19 April 2023.

== Reception ==
The film's music received positive reviews from critics. Critics at the board of Bollywood Hungama wrote "The Music is of the chartbuster variety. Though there are 8 songs in the film, it doesn't cause inconvenience and are well-tuned. 'Naiyo Lagda' is the best of the lot followed by 'Yentamma' and 'Bathukamma'. 'Jee Rahe The Hum' is cute while 'Tere Bina' is touching. 'O Balle Balle' is okay while 'Billi Billi' is catchy. 'Let's Dance Chotu Motu' is the only track that fails to entice. Ravi Basrur's background score is terrific and massy."

Reviewing the soundtrack, ZEE5 wrote "These tracks are game changers, meticulously constructed by a team of musical geniuses. Each song is a masterpiece, loaded with addictive beats, captivating melodies, and lyrics that hit you directly in the feels.

Simran Singh of DNA India wrote "KKBKKJ has decent music, and the eight songs are well-placed. Billi Billi, Yentamma, and Balle Balle look visually appealing, and it best enjoyed on the big screen." In her review for India TV News, Joyeeta Mitra Suvarna wrote "From Balle Balle to Billi Billi, all the songs are catchy."

== Track listing ==
Kisi Ka Bhai Kisi Ki Jaan (Original Motion Picture Soundtrack)
No.	Title	Lyrics	Music	Singer(s)	Length
1.	"Yentamma"	Shabbir Ahmed	Payal Dev	Vishal Dadlani, Payal Dev, MC Stan, Raftaar	2:56
2.	"Billi Billi"	Kumaar, Vicky Sandhu	Sukhbir	Sukhbir	2:54
3.	"Naiyo Lagda"	Shabbir Ahmed	Himesh Reshammiya	Kamaal Khan, Palak Muchhal	5:20
4.	"O Balle Balle"	Kumaar	Sukhbir, DJ Harshit Shah	Sukhbir, Kiran, Kabir, Dimpy	3:13
5.	"Jee Rahe The Hum (Falling in Love)"	Shabbir Ahmed	Amaal Malik	Salman Khan	3:11
6.	"Lets Dance Chotu Motu"	Devi Sri Prasad	Devi Sri Prasad	Salman Khan, Devi Sri Prasad, Yo Yo Honey Singh, Neha Bhasin, Nakash Aziz	3:20
7.	"Tere Bina"	Sajid Khan	Sajid Khan	Sajid–Wajid	3:17
8.	"Bathukamma"	Shabbir Ahmed, Ravi Basrur, Kinnal Raj, Harini Ivaturi	Ravi Basrur	Santhosh Venky, Aira Udupi, Harini Ivaturi, Sucheta Basrur, Vijaylaxmi Mettinahole	3:31
Total length:					27:42

Extended Soundtrack
No.	Title	Lyrics	Music	Singer(s)	Length
1.	"Jee Rahe The Hum (Falling in Love)"	Shabbir Ahmed	Amaal Malik	Sakshi Holkar	2:36
2.	"Kisi Ka Bhai Kisi Ki Jaan - Theme Song"	Ravi Basrur	Ravi Basrur	Santhosh Venky, Ravi Basrur, Sachin Basrur, Manish Dinakar	1:30
Total length:					4:06

== Chart performance ==
Chart	Song	Peak position	Ref.
India (Billboard)	"Naiyo Lagda"	7	
India (Billboard)	"Billi Billi"	9	
India (Billboard)	"Yentamma"	17	
Hot Trending Songs (Billboard)	"Jee Rahe The Hum (Falling in Love)"	2	
Hot Trending Songs (Billboard)	"Yentamma"	3	
Hot Trending Songs (Billboard)	"Lets Dance Chotu Motu"	4	

== Impact ==
The track "Naiyo Lagda" created a record for reaching 40 million views, within 24 hours of its release. The song has also become the fastest Hindi film song to reach 2 million Reels on Instagram. The song was one of the most viewed music videos on YouTube in 2023. The second song "Billi Billi" also garnered over 40 million views, within 24 hours of its release.

After the song "Billi Billi" was released in March 2023, the hook step choreographed by Jani Master and performed by Khan and Hegde in the music video, quickly went viral, adding to the song's popularity and becoming a social media sensation. Many people have recreated the hook step (signature step) by recording their own dance performances to the song and sharing these videos across social media platforms. Later, other songs followed this trend.
