= Naiyo Lagda =

2023 song by Himesh Reshammiya

- Official song cover featuring Salman Khan and Pooja Hegde

Single by Kamaal Khan and Palak Muchhal

from the album Kisi Ka Bhai Kisi Ki Jaan
- Language: Hindi
- Released: 12 February 2023
- Recorded: 2022
- Studio: HR Musik Studio, Mumbai
- Genre: Acoustic music; Romantic ballad; pop; Filmi
- Length: 5:20
- Label: Zee Music Company
- Composer: Himesh Reshammiya
- Lyricist: Shabbir Ahmed
- Producer: Himesh Reshammiya

Kisi Ka Bhai Kisi Ki Jaan track listing
- 1. "Yentamma"; 2. "Billi Billi"; 3. "Naiyo Lagda"; 4. "Jee Rahe The Hum (Falling in Love)"; 5. Lets Dance Chotu Motu"; 6. "Tere Bina"; 7. "Bathukamma"

Music video
- "Naiyo Lagda" on YouTube

"Naiyo Lagda" is an Indian Hindi-language song, composed by Himesh Reshammiya, with lyrics written by Shabbir Ahmed and sung by Kamaal Khan and Palak Muchhal for the soundtrack album of the 2023 Indian film Kisi Ka Bhai Kisi Ki Jaan. It was released on 12 February 2023, coinciding Valentine's Day as the first single from the album, through Zee Music Company.

Upon release, the song received positive reviews by audience and critics. The track "Naiyo Lagda" created the record for reaching 40 million views, within 24 hours of its release. The track also topped the national charts, in all music and video platforms.

== Composition and lyrics ==
"Naiyo Lagda" served as the first single to be released from the soundtrack album of Kisi Ka Bhai Kisi Ki Jaan. The track was composed by Himesh Reshammiya, who was Salman Khan's norm collaborator. Reshammiya collaborated with Kamaal Khan and Palak Muchhal to record the song.

I think this song has a very strong nostalgic vibe. It just makes you connect with some phase of your life. It makes you feel very nostalgic when you hear it. I am getting responses from every set of generations, from young to old people. People born in the 90s are especially liking this song. Yeah, for me, it’s special for personal reasons.

— Palak Muchhal, about the song.

Lyricist Shabbir Ahmed worked on lyrics of the song. The phrase "Naiyo lagda dil tere bina" translates to "My heart doesn't like it without you". The lyrical video was released on 10 October 2023 on YouTube. The track was mixed and mastered by Salman Shaikh at Reshammiya's HR Musik Studio.

== Music video ==
The music video song, featuring visuals directly from the film, was released on 12 February 2023 on YouTube. The music video features Salman Khan and Pooja Hegde. The song is shot at beautiful locations around Leh and Ladakh.

=== Background and production ===
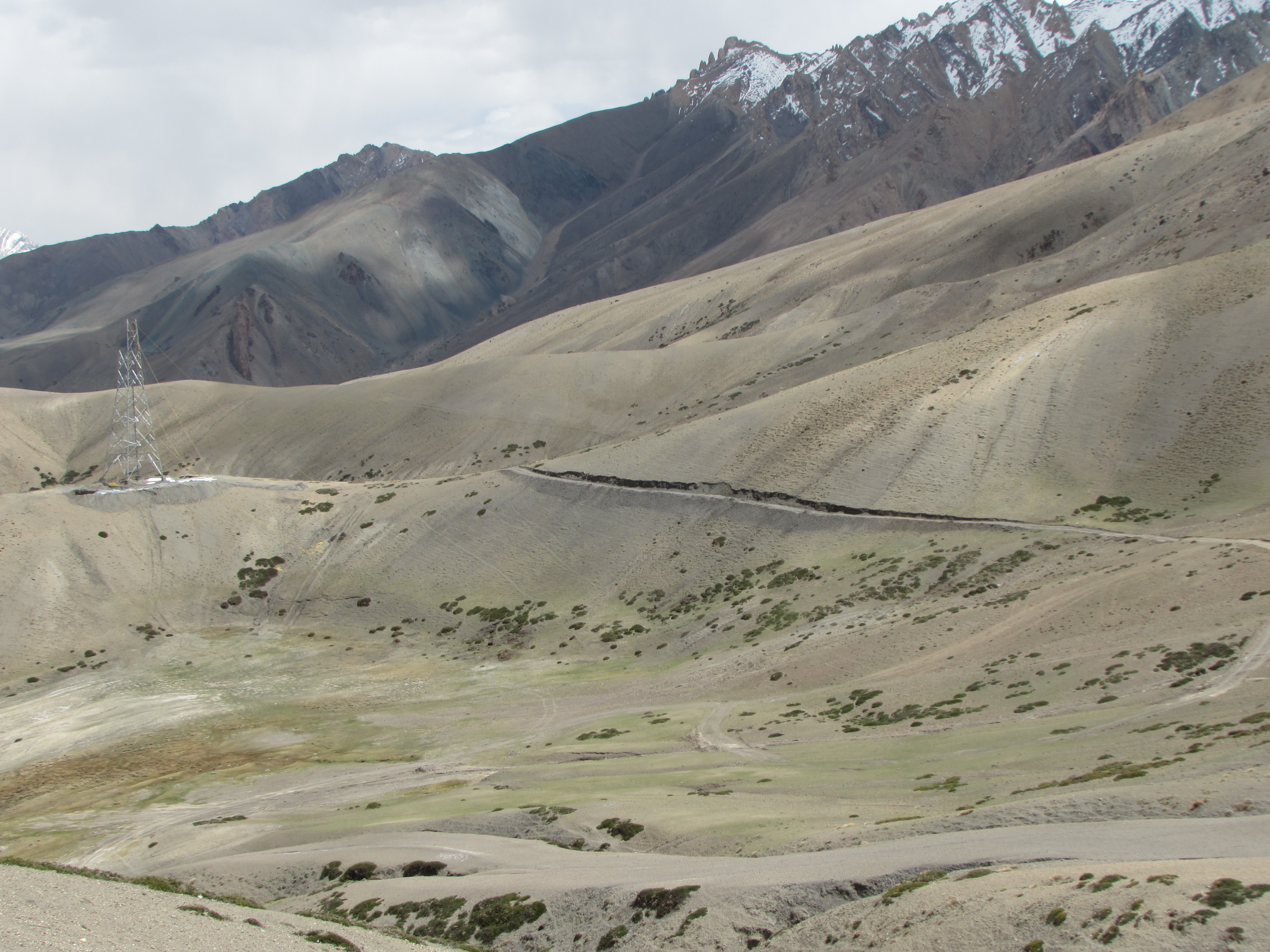
"Naiyo Lagda" was shot at the Ladakh.

Shabina Khan, in an interview with Mid-Day told, "One day I got a call from Salman sir's team saying there's a romantic song and bhai [Salman Khan] wants you to do it. They wanted this one to be different from the other romantic songs that the audience is used to. They approached me because bhai thinks I shoot romantic songs well."

The music video was directed by Mihir Gulati. Shabina Khan choreographed the dance sequences. Shabina Khan revealed they did a recce at several locations before zeroing in on Ladakh. Khan wanted a location that looked larger than life and had a romantic feel. The challenges were we had to acclimatise the unit so that they don't face breathing issues. They could not give heavy steps that involved running because of the weather conditions. The song picturization took 4 days.

=== Costume ===
The costume designer Ashley Rebello said that the team shot the song in Ladakh and had decided to go with a completely Indian look, which involved different kinds of sherwanis and kurtas in different colours. In last minute we decided to go with jeans, linen shirts and waistcoats. He had to run around and contacted a local designer in Ladakh, who work with pure wool and linen. He sat with them and get a shirt ready for the shoot taking place on the next day. He also said, getting leather waistcoats was also a problem there, so they got jackets that are more easily available in Ladakh. But, he had to cut and patch them up together and turned them into waistcoats. He added turquoise accessories as they were largely available in Ladakh. The hair was Khan's idea and the whole flowy look was part of Khan's character. They had to keep the fabric fluid to give it a dreamy effect.

== Release ==
The teaser of the song was unveiled on 11 February 2023. Anticipation for the song was increased post teaser release. The song was launched during the grand finale of Bigg Boss 16 on 12 February, and later on music platforms, coinciding Valentine's Day. The lyrical video was released on 10 October 2023 on YouTube.

== Reception ==
=== Audience ===
Upon the release of the song, its music and the lyrics, as well as the performance by singers Kamaal Khan and Palak Muchhal received positive reviews. The chemistry of Salman Khan and Pooja Hegde was also highly praised. The song was well received by the audience. It was termed as the "love anthem of the year". The track also topped the national charts, in all music and video platforms.

=== Critics ===
Critics at the board of Bollywood Hungama wrote 'Naiyo Lagda' is the best of the lot [songs]. Praising its lyrics and composition, Srivathsan Nadadhur of OTTPlay wrote "The song is clearly aimed at listeners who’re missing the simplistically composed numbers sung by the likes of Udit Narayan, Alka Yagnik during the Nadeem-Shravan and Jatin-Lalit era in the 90s." Sonal Verma of Zee News commented it "is the perfect romantic tune for lovers to rejoice in valentine's week.

== Impact ==
"Naiyo Lagda" created a record for reaching 40 million views, within 24 hours of its release. The song has also become the fastest Hindi film song to reach 2 million Reels on Instagram. The song was one of the most viewed music videos on YouTube in 2023. Tanzanian content creator Kili Paul released a cover video on the track.

Shabina Khan, the choreographer of the track, stated that Salman Khan and Pooja Hegde's chemistry is superb, people have seen and loved the song. If the actors don't have good chemistry we choreographers or even the director can't do anything to save it. Pooja and Salman share a beautiful chemistry, every shot looks spectacular as if they are really in love. 'Naiyo Lagda' will make history because of Salman Khan and Pooja Hegde's chemistry.

== Credits and personnel ==
Credits adapted from YouTube.

- Himesh Reshammiya – composer
- Shabbir Ahmed – lyricist
- Kamaal Khan – vocal
- Palak Muchhal – vocal
- Shabina Khan – Choreographer
- Salman Shaikh – mix engineer, mastering engineer
- Deepak Sinha – guitarist
- Anudutt Shamain – assistant mixing engineer
- Vishal R.D – assistant sound engineer

== Charts ==
Chart performances for "Naiyo Lagda"
| Chart (2023) | Peak position |
|---|---|
| India (Billboard) Naiyo Lagda | 6 |
