= Yentamma =

2023 song by Vishal Dadlani, Payal Dev and Shabbir Ahmed

- Official song cover featuring Salman Khan and Pooja Hegde

Single by Vishal Dadlani, Payal Dev and Raftaar

from the album Kisi Ka Bhai Kisi Ki Jaan
- Language: Hindi; Telugu
- Released: 4 April 2023
- Recorded: 2022
- Studio: YRF Studios, Mumbai
- Genre: EDM; dance; kuthu; pop; Filmi
- Length: 2:56
- Label: Zee Music Company
- Composer: Payal Dev
- Lyricist: Shabbir Ahmed
- Producer: Aditya Dev

Kisi Ka Bhai Kisi Ki Jaan track listing
- 1. "Yentamma"; 2. "Billi Billi"; 3. "Naiyo Lagda"; 4. "Jee Rahe The Hum (Falling in Love)"; 5. Lets Dance Chotu Motu"; 6. "Tere Bina"; 7. "Bathukamma"

Music video
- "Yentamma" on YouTube

"Yentamma" (transl. What's up?) is an Indian Hindi-language song, composed by Payal Dev, who also sung the track with Vishal Dadlani. Lyrics were written by Kumaar with rap portion performed by Raftaar for the soundtrack album of the 2023 Indian film Kisi Ka Bhai Kisi Ki Jaan. It was released on 4 April 2023, as the fifth single from the album, through Zee Music Company.

Upon release, the song received positive reviews by audience and critics. The track "Yentamma" also topped the national charts, in all music and video platforms.

== Composition and lyrics ==
"Yentamma" served as the fifth single to be released from the soundtrack album of Kisi Ka Bhai Kisi Ki Jaan. The track was composed by Payal Dev in her fourth collaboration with Salman Khan. She too sang the track with Vishal Dadlani. The song was written by Shabbir Ahmed. The rap portion of the song was written and performed by rapper Raftaar. The Hindi-Telugu fusion song had the additional lyrics and vocals by Aditya Dev, who also produced the track. After hearing the track, Hegde felt it will be hit among the audience. Palak Tiwari revealed the song as her favourite song in the film. In early-October 2022, Khan confirmed the Ram Charan inclusion in the song. Khan also revealed that it was Charan's compulsion to be a part of the film.

== Music video ==
The music video song, featuring visuals directly from the film, was released on 4 April 2023 on YouTube. The music video features Salman Khan and Pooja Hegde primarily, with Venkatesh, Bhumika Chawla, Raghav Juyal, Jassie Gill, Siddharth Nigam, Shehnaaz Gill, Palak Tiwari and Vinali Bhatnagar. The music video was choreographed by Jani Master. The song which also featured Ram Charan is a special appearance, was shot at a special set built in Chiranjeevi's own land in the Kokapet area for Acharya. The music video featured about 2000 dancers and 1000 Royal Enfields.

Hegde said that she had a blast while shooting for the song with Khan, Charan and Venkatesh. "The highlight of the song shoot was dancing in a lungi with all my heart", she added. Charan described the experience as a little boy's dream coming true, and he didn't take the payment for his appearance. Raghav Juyal said that Khan taught him to wear lungi for the track. The making video of the music video was released by the makers on 6 April 2024.

== Release ==
The song was highly anticipated by the fans. The teaser of the song was released on 3 April 2024. The song teaser increased the expectations for the full song. The fifth single, titled "Yentamma" was released on 4 April 2024, through Zee Music Company.

== Reception ==
A critic from Filmfare wrote "Yentamma is a Hindi-Telugu fusion song and is a treat for the Hindi and Telugu audience who will end up dancing their hearts out with lungis. Bringing a plethora of bright colours celebrating the rich culture from the Southern part of India, with a tadka of Salman Khan, the song features Venkatesh Daggubati and Pooja Hedge dancing with their lungis on this coolest swag song." Ridhi Suri of India TV said "Enriched with a bundle of entertainment, the song is worth reckoning as the coolest swag song of the year."

Abhilasha Cherukuri of Cinema Express noted "Much like Chennai Express (2012), this song also features lyrics on the lungi. It may be noted that the men in the videos are wearing Panchakattu/Veshtis while dancing to lyrics mentioning the word 'lungi' prominently." ABP News wrote "With all the elements to make people go crazy on its heart-thumping beats, 'Yentamma' has brought together Salman Khan, Ram Charan, Venkatesh Daggubati, and Pooja Hegde in the same frame to bring the house down with their whistle-worthy dance moves."

Hindustan Times said that this song reminds "Lungi Dance" from the film Chennai Express. Chirag Sehgal of News18 stated "Both Salman and Venkatesh turn bullet lovers, before diving right into the peppy choreography which is accentuated by the feature of multiple background dancers. With colourful tones, it appears that the song is set against the pretext of a lavish family event or popular celebration. In addition to this, a larger-than-life set with southern accents and architecture and costumes representative of the Indian part appears to be carefully picked to boost the song's vibe."

A critic of The Indian Express commented "The setting is also quite a colourful one, hinting that the song has been shot during a celebration or festival. The lyrics and tune are also quite catchy, while the distinct hook step is open to question. The Bollywood representation of regional music and dance sometimes leaves a lot to be desired." Praising the dance choreography, A The Times of India noted "The song's choreography is another highlight of the music video. The three actors perform a variety of dance styles, including lungi dance, and freestyle. The choreography is well-synchronized and adds to the song's overall appeal."

Sunidhi Prajapat of OTTPlay wrote "Just like Bathukamma, Yentamma is also packed with vibrant colours, as well as flowers and it showcases love and brotherhood, which seem to be the motto of Kisi Ka Bhai Kisi Ki Jaan." A Onmanorama staff wrote "The energetic dance steps by Salman Khan, Venkatesh, Pooja Hegde and Ram Charan, are the highlight of the song".

Free Press Journal said "With all the elements to make people go crazy on its heart-thumping beats, Yentamma has brought together the superstars in the same frame." Ayushee Joshi of Dainik Jagran wrote "With a Salman tadka, the song also offers a peek at the rich culture of Southern India."

Taru B Masand of Times Now commented "Salman Khan, Ram Charan, Venkatesh Daggubati's whistle-worthy moves SLAY". Vrinda Mundara of Asianet News Network wrote "Pooja Hegde looks spectacular and stunning in her saree and white lungi in the second half of the song as she also displays smooth buttery dance moves alongside Salman and Venkatesh."

== Impact ==
Upon its release, the song started trending on internet and became a chartbuster. The song received positive reception from audiences, praising the music. The song broken several viewership records online.

The hook step choreographed by Jani Master and performed by Khan, Charan, Hegde and Daggubati in the music video, quickly went viral, adding to the song's popularity and becoming a social media sensation. Many people have recreated the hook step (signature step) by recording their own dance performances to the song and sharing these videos across social media platforms. Sahelee Rakshit of News 24 felt that the "fusion of actors and lyrics from the South and the North has resulted in a brand-new hit song".

== Controversy ==
South Indians alleged that the song disrespects their culture for promoting dhoti as "lungi". The line "naachenge uthaakarke lungi" (transl. we'll dance by lifting our lungi) was highly criticised.

Former cricketer Laxman Sivaramakrishnan slammed the song due to allegedly inappropriate use of mundu (dhoti), saying that it is "highly ridiculous" and "degrading the South Indian culture". He even requested CBFC to ban the song.

M K Raghavendra of Deccan Herald criticized for using boots inside temple. Janani K of India Today stated "The travesty of the song that is Yentamma is that it is yet another classic case of South Indian stereotyping. Right from Chennai Express, filmmakers have always been misrepresenting South Indians. The accent, over-the-top action and, not to forget, the famous "Lungi Dance", Chennai Express wasn't a pleasant watch for the South Indians."

== Credits and personnel ==
- Sukhbir – composer, vocal
- Kumaar – lyricist
- Vicky Sandhu – additional lyricist
- Jani Master – Choreographer
- Mauro Caccialanza – mix engineer, mastering engineer

== Charts ==
Chart performances for "Yentamma"
Chart (2023)	Peak position
India (Billboard)|	17
Hot Trending Songs (Billboard)	3
United Kingdom (Asian Music Chart Top 40)	29
