= Koena Mitra =

Indian former actress and model (born 1984)

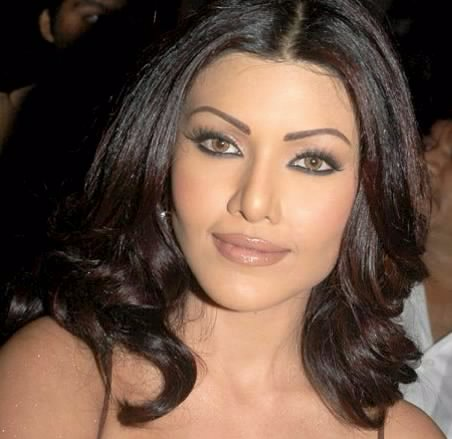
- Mitra in 2015
- Born: 7 January 1984 (age 42); Calcutta, West Bengal, India
- Education: Lady Brabourne College
- Occupation: Actress
- Years active: 2002–2019

Koena Mitra (Bengali pronunciation: [kojena mitro]; born 7 January 1984) is an Indian actress, model and beauty pageant titleholder who represented India at Miss Intercontinental 2001 and placed Top 12. She is known for appearing in Hindi films along with Tamil films and Bengali films.

== Early life ==
Mitra was born in Kolkata, India, in a Bengali family. She attended Lee Strasberg Theatre and Film Institute.

== Career ==
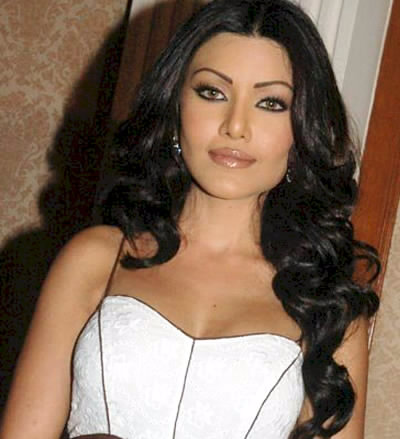
Mitra in 2006

Mitra started her modelling career while she was still in school.

She was featured in several music videos, including Stereo Nation’s Ishq, Aaj Ki Raat, Akh Teri, and Channo by Jasbir Jassi. Her first film appearance was a special appearance in Ram Gopal Varma's Road. In 2004, her biggest success came with Sanjay Dutt in Musafir, in the song O Saki Saki. The movie was produced by Sanjay Gupta and Sanjay Dutt.

In 2005 she appeared in the film Ek Khiladi Ek Haseena playing the role of Natasha. In the same year she appeared in her next film, Insan In 2006, she appeared in the film Apna Sapna Money Money acting as Julie. In 2007, she appeared in the films Om Shanti Om and Heyy Babyy as herself.

In 2009, she participated in the third season of Jhalak Dikhhla Jaa. In 2019 she was a contestant in Colors TV's reality show, Bigg Boss 13. She entered the house on 29 September 2019 and was evicted on 13 October.

== In the media ==
In 2019, Mitra was among the ten most searched personalities in India on Google.

== Filmography ==
=== Films ===
Year	Title	Role	Notes
2002	Road	Special appearance	in Number "Khullam Khulla"
2003	Dhool	Special appearance	Tamil film, in "Koduva Meesai" item song
2004	Musafir	Lara	
2005	Ek Khiladi Ek Haseena	Natasha Kapoor	
2005	Insan	Sonali Rathod	
2006	Apna Sapna Money Money	Julie Fernandez	
2007	Heyy Babyy	Special appearance	in the song "Heyy Babyy"
2007	Aggar		
2008	Anamika	Malini	
2009	Ayan		Tamil film, in song "Honey Honey"
2015	Besh Korechi Prem Korechi	Kajal	

=== Television ===
Year	Name	Role	Notes
2007	Fear Factor India	Contestant	Finalist
2009	Jhalak Dikhhla Jaa 3	Contestant	Wild card entrant, eliminated
2019	Bigg Boss 13	Contestant	Evicted on Day 14
