= Musafir (2004 film) =

2004 Indian film by Sanjay Gupta

- Theatrical release poster
- Directed by: Sanjay Gupta
- Written by: Sanjay Gupta; Sameer Malhotra; Milap Zaveri
- Produced by: Sanjay Gupta
- Starring: Sanjay Dutt; Anil Kapoor; Sameera Reddy; Aditya Pancholi; Koena Mitra; Mahesh Manjrekar; Shakti Kapoor
- Cinematography: P.S. Vinod
- Edited by: Bunty Nagi
- Music by: Songs: Vishal–Shekhar; Guest Composer: Anand Raj Anand; Background Score: Sandeep Chowta
- Release date: 10 December 2004
- Running time: 151 minutes
- Country: India
- Language: Hindi
- Budget: ₹130 million
- Box office: ₹187.1 million

Musafir (transl. Traveller) is a 2004 Indian Hindi-language neo-noir action thriller film written, directed and produced by Sanjay Gupta, starring Sanjay Dutt, Anil Kapoor, Sameera Reddy, Aditya Pancholi, Mahesh Manjrekar, Shakti Kapoor, and introducing Koena Mitra in her film debut. The film was mostly shot in Goa.

Musafir was released on 10 December 2004. A remake of the 1997 American film U Turn, it was initially controversial due to some sexual content, but went on to receive positive reviews from critics, with some considering it to be better than the original film. Oliver Stone, the director of U Turn, also appreciated the film. However, it was a commercial failure.

== Plot ==
Lucky is a small-time criminal, hoping to retire with his girlfriend Lara after one last job. Unfortunately for him, things do not go as planned, and he becomes involved with a ruthless killer Billa. Lucky steals 2.5 million from Billa but Lara steals it from him instead. He then learns that his friends have been murdered. Billa tracks Lucky down and Lucky is able to strike a deal. He is to go to Goa and meet Whacko Jacko and sell him a bag of unknown contents. He then meets Jacko and sets a rendezvous. On his return to his hotel, he comes across a police inspector who seems to have become suspicious of Lucky.

At a small restaurant, he sees Sam. He follows her and gets an opportunity to meet her when her car breaks down. He offers her a lift home. When her husband, Lukka, shows up, they retrieve her car from the road, and go home. That night Lucky arrives in a nightclub to meet Jacko again. Here he again comes across Sam. After getting the money, Lucky prepares to leave the next morning. Sam arrives at Lucky's hotel to meet him. But their meeting is cut short when Lucky notices the same inspector. He tells Sam to hide and hides the bag of money in the vehicle of an unsuspecting motorist. By the time the Inspector leaves, the vehicle with the money is gone. Meanwhile, Billa tracks down Lara, gets the money back and kills her.

While Billa hides the fact that he has his money back, Lucky hides that he has lost the money. He again comes across Lukka. It turns out that he wants Lucky to kill Sam, and in return, Lucky would get 2.5 million. Sam meets Lucky and sets up a deal that if Lucky would kill Lukka, she would pay him 2.5 million. Both of them want the work done that night. That night Lukka tries to sexually assault Sam after she refuses to remove her blouse when he asks her to. Sam accidentally shoots Lukka dead. Lucky, however, gets the money, and both try to flee Goa. But the inspector is following them. Sam identifies the inspector as Lukka's brother Tiger and the 2.5 million actually belong to Tiger. Lucky somehow shakes Tiger off his pursuit, and hides the money. The next morning she is nowhere to be found. Lucky desperately searches for her, and when he finally finds her, he realises that he has fallen in love with her. Suddenly they are attacked by Inspector Tiger with his police force.

Lucky is running out of ammunition when Billa arrives and shoots down all the police officers. Tiger, however, manages to escape by making Sam his hostage. At gunpoint, Lucky agrees to take Billa to the place where the money is hidden. When they reach the platform, Lucky finds that Tiger has discovered the money. Tiger and Lucky start fighting, but Billa intervenes and strikes a final deal. Both Lucky and Tiger have to walk on two parallel railway tracks blindfolded as a train comes towards them. If Lucky survives, then he will get Sam, while Billa will take the money, but if Tiger is saved, he gets the money, and Billa will take Sam.

The train, however changes tracks at the last moment and heads towards Lucky. Sam screams in horror and pleads with Billa to let her go. From Sam's scream, Tiger realises that Lucky is doomed. He takes off his blindfold and waves a farewell at Lucky. But Billa notices Tiger wearing a bracelet belonging to a deceased member of his gang and deduces Tiger must have been involved with their death. He promptly shoots Tiger dead. He then allows Sam to run to Lucky and try to save him. She pulls him off the tracks before the train could reach him. Billa smiles and rides away on his bike. After going a short distance, he stops and drops the bag to the ground in a brief act of generosity and then leaves.

== Trivia ==
The TV presenter Konnie Huq appears as an extra in the club scene of the film.

== Cast ==
- Sanjay Dutt as Billa
- Anil Kapoor as Lucky
- Sameera Reddy as Sam
- Aditya Pancholi as Inspector Tiger
- Mahesh Manjrekar as Lukka
- Shakti Kapoor as Whacko Jacko
- Koena Mitra as Lara
- Aksha Pardasany as Young Sam
- Manoj Pahwa as Manu
- Ashwini Kalsekar as Angela
- Parag Tyagi as Cameo

== Themes ==
Critic Taran Adarsh pointed out in his review that while the film was loosely based on the 1997 American film U Turn, it was a fairly original tale and not something contrived, recycled or a scene-to-scene copy of U Turn. According to him, director Sanjay Gupta tackled themes of infidelity, incest, ill luck, paranoia, mistrust, murder, deception, fraud, money and the mafia. He also went to label it "provocative and graphic", and noted how it examined the mind of several immoral men, which he believed was "a lane not many 'play safe' Bollywood filmmakers would want to venture into."

== Critical reception ==
Taran Adarsh from Bollywood Hungama rated the film 4/5, calling it "a shining example of cinema that dares to be different, of going against the set norms, of defying the rigid set of laws of Bollywood formulaic films." He also felt the film reflected the transition of Hindi cinema and the changing face of Indian cinema. Fullhyd.com gave it 7.5 stars out of 10, praising the music, dialogues, editing, script and the casting.

== Soundtrack ==
Musafir

Soundtrack album by Vishal–Shekhar and Anand Raj Anand
- Released: 1 October 2004 (Digital Release); 10 December 2004 (Film)
- Genre: Feature film soundtrack
- Length: 97:12
- Label: T-Series

Vishal–Shekhar chronology
Popcorn Khao! Mast Ho Jao (2004)	Musafir (2004)	Shabd (2005)

Anand Raj Anand chronology
Wajah (2003)	Musafir (2004)	Kaal (2005)

The music of the film was composed by Vishal–Shekhar. Anand Raj Anand composed one track, "Ishq Kabhi Kario Na". Four tracks in the album are remixes of the original ones from Kaante. The background score was composed by Ram Gopal Varma collaborator Sandeep Chowta. Dev Kohli, Kumaar, Vishal Dadlani and Milap Zaveri provided the lyrics. The music was applauded by critics and the audience for being experimental and different. The compositions of Vishal–Shekhar heavily used techno, and trance beats, and the album itself was divided into two CDs—"Club" and "Longue". Songs like "Ishq Kabhi Kario Na", "Saaki", and "Door Se Paas" were highly popular among the youth. Vishal–Shekhar made Kumar Sanu sing a techno song, "Phir Na Kehna", a very rare Western-style song for Kumar Sanu. According to the Indian trade website Box Office India, with around 18,00,000 units sold, this film's soundtrack album was the year's seventh highest-selling. The song "Saki" was recreated for film Batla House.

=== Track list ===
CD 1 – Club
No.	Title	Lyrics	Music	Singer(s)	Length
1.	"Ishq Kabhi Kario Na" (Flea Market Trance Mix)	Dev Kohli	Anand Raj Anand	Sunidhi Chauhan	4:28
2.	"Saaki" (Psychedelic Insomnia Mix)	Dev Kohli	Vishal–Shekhar	Sukhwinder Singh, Sunidhi Chauhan	5:24
3.	"Door Se Paas" (Missy in the Pool Mix)	Dev Kohli	Vishal–Shekhar	KK	6:06
4.	"Rabba" (Agony And Ecstasy Mix)	Kumaar, Dev Kohli	Vishal–Shekhar	Krishna Beura	5:52
5.	"Tez Dhaar" (Sex on Wheels Mix)	Vishal Dadlani, Milap Zaveri	Vishal–Shekhar	Sanjay Dutt	5:36
6.	"Ishq Kabhi Kario Na" (Paradiso Mix)	Dev Kohli	Anand Raj Anand	Sukhwinder Singh	4:23
7.	"Ishq Samunder*" (Back To Life Mix)	Dev Kohli	Anand Raj Anand	Sunidhi Chauhan, Anand Raj Anand	5:22
8.	"Rama Re" (The Boys Are Back Mix)	Dev Kohli	Anand Raj Anand	Zubeen Garg, Shaan, Sanjay Dutt	6:65
9.	"Rabba" (Kinky in Ibiza Mix)	Kumaar, Dev Kohli	Vishal–Shekhar	Richa Sharma	7:51
Total length:					51:58

CD 2 – Lounge
No.	Title	Lyrics	Music	Singer(s)	Length
10.	"Rabba" (Farewell To Sadness Mix)	Kumaar, Dev Kohli	Vishal–Shekhar	Richa Sharma	6:22
11.	"Sun Suniyo" (Anjuna Laguna Mix)	Dev Kohli	Vishal–Shekhar	Hema Sardesai	4:23
12.	"Tez Dhaar" (Billa's Journey Mix)	Vishal Dadlani, Milap Zaveri	Vishal–Shekhar	Sanjay Dutt	5:24
13.	"Phir Na Kehna" (Crazy in Zanzibar Mix)	Dev Kohli	Vishal–Shekhar	Kumar Sanu, Sunidhi Chauhan	5:39
14.	"Ek Dil Ne" (Casa Brittona Mix)	Dev Kohli	Vishal–Shekhar	Kunal Ganjawala, Shreya Ghoshal	4:57
15.	"Rabba" (Kiss of Death Mix)	Kumaar, Dev Kohli	Vishal–Shekhar	Sukhwinder Singh	6:04
16.	"Yaar Mangyasi*" (Eternal Moment Mix)	Dev Kohli	Anand Raj Anand	Sonu Nigam	6:22
17.	"Mahi Ve*" (Sleep With Destiny Mix)	Dev Kohli	Anand Raj Anand	Zubeen Garg, Sukhwinder Singh, Richa Sharma	6:03
Total length:					45:14

*Originally featured in Kaante.
