= Shabina Khan =

Indian choreographer (born 1980)

- Born: Shabina Khan; 15 May 1980 (age 46); Mumbai
- Occupation: Choreographer
- Years active: 1996–present
- Spouse: Javed Ahmed Ansari
- Children: Ariana Dua Ansari & Azaan Alborz Ansari
- Parent(s): Mohammed Shaukat Khan; Rafiqa Banu

Shabina Khan is an Indian choreographer. She choreographed songs for the Salman Khan starrer films Jai Ho, Dabangg, Prem Ratan Dhan Payo, Tubelight and Kisi Ka Bhai Kisi Ki Jaan.

== Career ==
Shabina Kkhan is an Indian film choreographer, director & producer. She has over 18 years of experience in Hindi films (Bollywood) as an Assistant Choreographer and as an Independent Director of Choreography. She learned acting and classical dance from Madhumati's Academy of Dance and Acting and trained in Ballet and Modern Contemporary Dancing in London. Shabina's first film as a choreographer was 'Main Madhuri Dixit Banna Chahti Hoon' (2003), followed by several commercial hit film songs.

She has worked with esteemed film directors namely Mr. Ram Gopal Varma, Mr. Mahesh Bhatt, Mr. Indra Kumar, Mr. Prabhu Deva, Mr. Kabir Khan, Mr. Anees Bazmee, Mr. Vishal Bhardwaj, Mr. Anil Sharma, Mr Sooraj R Barjatya.

Shabina got her first Filmfare Awards nomination for the film 'Pataakha' (2018). In 2023, one of the biggest commercial Hindi films, 'Gadar2' all the songs were choreographed by Shabina.

She has also launched 'Reality in Reality', a reality show initiative through which she wants to provide a platform for dancers to show off their skills.

== Filmography ==
Year	Film	Language
2003	Main Madhuri Dixit Banna Chahti Hoon	Hindi
2003	Darna Mana Hai	Hindi
2003	Janasheen	Hindi
2003	Stumped	Hindi
2003	Bhoot	Hindi
2004	Naach	Hindi
2005	Mr Ya Miss	Hindi
2005	Yahaan	Hindi
2005	Aashiq Banaya Aapne	Hindi
2006	Aksar	Hindi
2006	Siruthai	Tamil
2006	Bangaram	Telugu
2007	Aag	Hindi
2007	Speed	Hindi
2007	Go	Hindi
2007	Red: The Dark Side	Hindi
2008	One Two Three	Hindi
2008	Homan	Telugu
2009	Ek Vivaah... Aisa Bhi	Hindi
2009	Radio	Hindi
2009	Jashnn	Hindi
2010	Dabangg	Hindi
2010	My Friend Ganesha 3	Hindi
2010	Kajraare	Hindi
2010	Rakta Charitra	Hindi
2010	Paiyaa	Tamil
2011	Bbuddah... Hoga Terra Baap	Hindi
2011	Veera	Telugu
2011	Prem Kavali	Telugu
2012	Mere Dost Picture Abhi Baki Hai	Hindi
2012	Will You Marry Me?	Hindi
2012	Jism 2	Hindi
2012	Department	Hindi
2012	Lovely	Telugu
2013	Ishk Actually	Hindi
2013	Zindagi 50-50	Hindi
2013	Satya 2	Hindi
2013	Main Krishna Hoon	Hindi
2014	Jai Ho	Hindi
2014	Super Nani	Hindi
2015	Dolly Ki Doli	Hindi
2016	Prem Ratan Dhan Payo	Hindi
2016	Jawani Phir Nahi Ani	Urdu
2017	Wajah Tum Ho	Hindi
2017	Tubelight	Hindi
2017	Ram Ratan	Hindi
2017	Aksar 2	Hindi
2017	Punjab Nahi Jaungi	Urdu
2018	Jawani Phir Nahi Aani 2	Urdu
2018	Pataakha	Hindi
2018	Lupt	Hindi
2018	Bharat Ane Nenu	Telugu
2023	Kisi Ka Bhai Kisi Ki Jaan	Hindi
2022	Uuchai	Hindi
2021	Radhe	Hindi
2019	Pagalpanti	Hindi
2019	Notebook	Hindi
2019	Cabaret	Hindi
2020	Sab Kushal Mangal	Hindi
2023	Yaaran Diya Poun Baaran	Punjabi
2023	Gadar 2	Hindi
2024	Vanvaas	Hindi
2025	Mannu Kya Karegga	Hindi
