= Apna Sapna Money Money =

2006 Indian film by Sangeeth Sivan

- Theatrical release poster
- Directed by: Sangeeth Sivan
- Written by: Pankaj Trivedi; Sachin shah
- Produced by: Subhash Ghai; Raju Farooqui
- Starring: Sunil Shetty; Ritesh Deshmukh; Shreyas Talpade; Jackie Shroff; Koena Mitra; Anupam Kher; Riya Sen; Celina Jaitly; Chunky Pandey; Rajpal Yadav; Sunil Pal
- Cinematography: Ramji
- Edited by: Bunty Nagi; Chirag Jain
- Music by: Score: Sunil Singh; Songs: Pritam
- Distributed by: Mukta Arts
- Release date: 10 November 2006
- Running time: 138 minutes
- Country: India
- Language: Hindi
- Budget: ₹95 million
- Box office: ₹207.3 million

Apna Sapna Money Money (lit. 'Our Dream is [only] Money and Money') is a 2006 Indian Hindi-language comedy film directed by Sangeeth Sivan. Apna Sapna Money Money is a tale of several characters who are in a mad race to be rich. Produced by Subhash Ghai, the film stars Suniel Shetty, Ritesh Deshmukh, Shreyas Talpade, Celina Jaitly, Koena Mitra, Anupam Kher, Riya Sen, Jackie Shroff, Bobby Darling, Rajpal Yadav, Chunky Pandey, and Sunil Pal. The film received mixed reviews and was a moderate success.

== Plot ==
6 Alvares House in Bandra, Mumbai, is the residence of myopic, widowed, devout Hindu, Satyabol Shastri, who lives there with his daughter, Shivani. Shivani is in love with her Christian neighbor, Arjun Fernandes, who is a mechanic and lives with his friends, which include Sis, Mohbatti, a wannabe singer, Julie, and a younger, ailing sister, Titli. Satyabol disapproves of Arjun and wants his daughter to marry Sarju Maharaj Banaraswale's son. Other than Satyabol chasing Badshah, the pet dog of Arjun, and ending up in the women's bathroom, the area is fairly peaceful.

Then Arjun and his friends try to think of a plan to stop Sarju from marrying his son to Shivani but can't. So Arjun calls his cousin Kishan to help them. Kishan comes disguised as Sarju Maharaj Banaraswale by tricking the real Sarju into getting off the train, and as soon as he gets off the train, some goons who think he is a relative of Kishan catch him and take him to find out where Kishan is. Meanwhile, Kishan becomes Sarju and convinces Satyabol that his (Sarju's) son is not good for his (Shashtri's) daughter by dancing in the bar and kissing Julie, who was in the act. Then Shashtri informs the fake Sarju that he does not want to marry his daughter to Sarju's son and that he can go now. So having finished his mission, Kishan prepares to leave when Arjun tells him to stay back as he loves Julie, but Kishan refuses to say that he is not destined for Julie. Then, after Arjun leaves and Rana turns up with the real Sarju, but when Kishan says that all the money is with Sarju, they leave. Kishan and run after Sarju while Kishan escapes, disguises himself as a woman named Sunaina, and says 'she' is Arjun's aunty, and soon Shashtri falls in love with her. Then in the neighbourhood also comes Matha Prasad, who runs a dairy farm and moonlights as the hitman of Bangkok-based underworld Don Carlos. The once honest cop Namdev Mane (pronounced as Maa-ne) teams up with Carlos' girlfriend Sania, who is on the lookout for hidden diamonds and facing bankruptcy - Carlos himself - as they face off in one of the most hilarious stand-offs to seek wealth and to fulfill their individual dreams.

== Cast ==
- Suniel Shetty as Namdev Mane, an honest cop dedicated to putting criminals behind bars. Some clever criminals who work in disguise have kept him on his toes.
- Ritesh Deshmukh as Kishan / Sania, a young man from Goa whose brain is full of every conceivable trick to make a quick buck. He cons people by slipping into different outfits and by assuming many guises. Julie's Boyfriend turned Husband.
- Shreyas Talpade as Arjun Fernandes, an honorable man who is content making a simple living with whatever money he earns from his garage. And later on, he meets the woman of his dreams Shivani Shastri.
- Celina Jaitly as Sania Badnaam, a con-woman who uses her beauty to lure men and leave them penniless later. Beautiful and unwilling to surrender to emotions easily, Sania craves only money and power.
- Koena Mitra as Julie Fernandes. Julie is a bar dancer with quite a reputation, but behind her raunchy exterior is a compassionate, kind-hearted woman who goes out of her way to help the needy. Kishan's Girlfriend turned Wife.
- Anupam Kher as Pandit Satyabol Shastri, the stubborn, overprotective, and aging father of Shivani who will not give away his daughter easily.
- Riya Sen as Shivani Shastri, a simple girl from a Brahmin family, but her strict father, Pandit Satyabol Shastri, would never let her marry Arjun. It will take a lot of effort to win her hand from her father.
- Jackie Shroff as Danny Carlos is a merciless underworld don with wacky fashion sense. He works from Bangkok and operates in India through Sania.
- Sanjay Mishra as Sarju Maharaj Banaraswale, a man who comes to see Shivani to make her his daughter-in-law.
- Rajpal Yadav as Maata Prasad
- Chunky Pandey as Rana Jang Bahadur
- Bobby Darling as Bobby Mohabbati
- Sunil Pal as Matha Prasad's assistant
- Avtar Gill as Sikh Police Inspector

== Music ==
All songs featured in the film were composed by Pritam and lyrics penned by Shabbir Ahmed apart from the song 'Paisa Paisa' which was written by Mayur Puri. The film score was composed by Sunil Singh. The additional instrumental song "Ganpaat Baja Na" has become the theme for Ganesh Visarjan since release, this track was additionally composed & sung by Pritam & another music director duo Vishal-Shekhar has also lend their voice in the song.

Track list
| No. | Title | Lyrics | Artist(s) | Length |
|---|---|---|---|---|
| 1. | "Dil Mein Baji Guitar" | Shabbir Ahmed | Mika Singh, Shehzad Roy | 4:26 |
| 2. | "Dil Mein Baji Guitar - 1" | Shabbir Ahmed | Amit Kumar, Mika Singh , Babul Supriyo | 4:25 |
| 3. | "Gustakh Nigah" | | Sukhwinder Singh, Alisha Chinoy, Joe Hisaishi | 5:37 |
| 4. | "Gustakh Nigah - 1" | | Sukhwinder Singh, Alisha Chinoy | 4:35 |
| 5. | "Jai Jai Money" | | Sukhwinder Singh, Rana Mazumder, Bob | 4:17 |
| 6. | "Jai Jai Money - 2" | | Sukhwinder Singh, Rana Mazumder, Bob | 4:47 |
| 7. | "Jai Jai Money - 3" | | Sukhwinder Singh, Rana Mazumder, Bob | 4:12 |
| 8. | "Paisa Paisa" | Mayur Puri | Suzanne D'Mello, Hamza Faruqui | 4:06 |
| 9. | "Paisa Paisa - 1" | Mayur Puri | Suzanne D'Mello, Hamza Faruqui | 4:32 |
| 10. | "Paisa Paisa - 2" | Mayur Puri | Suzanne D'Mello, Hamza Faruqui | 4:30 |
| 11. | "Saanya Badnaam" | Shabbir Ahmed | Sunidhi Chauhan, Bob (Rap) | 4:09 |
| 12. | "Additional Instrumental Track Composed by Pritam" | Ganpaat baja na - Additional Instrumental Track by Pritam | Sung by Pritam, Shekhar Ravjiani & Vishal Dadlani | 3:34 |
