= Ek Khiladi Ek Haseena (film) =

2005 Indian crime thriller film

- Theatrical release poster
- Directed by: Suparn Verma
- Written by: Suparn Verma
- Produced by: Rangita Pritish Nandy
- Starring: Fardeen Khan; Koena Mitra; Kay Kay Menon; Feroz Khan; Rohit Roy
- Narrated by: Fardeen Khan
- Cinematography: Manoj Soni
- Edited by: Hemal Kothari
- Music by: Songs: Pritam; Background Score: Absolute White
- Distributed by: Pritish Nandy Communications
- Release date: 18 November 2005
- Running time: 143 minutes
- Country: India
- Language: Hindi
- Budget: ₹5.75 crore
- Box office: ₹7.88 crore

Ek Khiladi Ek Haseena (transl. One Player, One Beauty) is a 2005 Indian Hindi-language crime thriller film written and directed by Suparn Verma. It stars Fardeen Khan, Feroz Khan, Kay Kay Menon and Koena Mitra. The film was released on 18 November 2005, and was a commercial failure.

== Plot ==
Ek Khiladi Ek Haseena focuses on the duo of Arjun Verma and his best friend Rohit Kapoor, who con people for a living.

During their latest of escapades, the duo manages to con the rich accountant of a don by the name of Sikander, resulting in them stealing millions of rupees. Soon after, Rohit is killed by Kharbu's men, and Arjun escapes to another city. Kharbu manages to track him down and orders him to pay up the stolen sum plus interest or face Sikander's retirement plan.

To get his hands on the millions, Arjun sets up a special team who will help him execute the plan. Also involved in the team is Natasha Kapoor, a psychiatrist who ends up being conned by the group but eventually succeeds in seeking revenge.

Thrown into this mix is another character by the name of Jehangir Khan, who slows down Arjun's plans to get his hands on the money.

But later it is shown that it was the plan of Arjun to seek revenge for the death of Rohit as Sikander is arrested by police in a drug case. The film ends with Arjun going with friends and his lover Natasha with the Jahangir money.

== Cast ==
- Fardeen Khan as Arjun Verma
- Koena Mitra as Dr. Natasha Kapoor, Psychiatrist
- Rohit Roy as Rohit Kapoor
- Feroz Khan as Jahangir Khan, Businessman
- Kay Kay Menon as Kaif
- Gulshan Grover as Sikander
- Kurush Deboo as Chipu / Sunny Dastur
- Amin Hajee as Jack
- Mukul Dev as Bhatia
- Daya Shankar Pandey as Inspector Sharma
- Rajesh Vivek as Inspector D'Souza
- Makrand Deshpande as G. Singh
- Murali Sharma as Jai Patel
- Sharad Kapoor as CBI Inspector Sardesai / Vijay Kapoor, Pune Crime Branch
- Mumaith Khan (special appearance)
- Rakhi Sawant (special appearance)
- Zabyn Khan (special appearance)

== Themes and influences ==
When questioned if the film is a rip-off of the American film Confidence as pointed out by many people, Verma explained that while there were mentions of the film being copied from Confidence, The Sting, and even Criminal, he just thought there were moments from a lot of films. He admitted there were certain similarities in the second half, but also claimed the film was not a rip-off but an amalgamation of several films he had loved.

== Soundtrack ==
Ek Khiladi Ek Haseena

Soundtrack album by Pritam Chakraborty
- Released: 25 August 2005 (Digital Release); 18 November 2005 (Film)
- Genre: Feature Film soundtrack
- Length: 38:17
- Label: T-Series
- Producer: Pritam Chakraborty

Pritam Chakraborty chronology
Garam Masala (2005)	Ek Khiladi Ek Haseena (2005)	Fight Club - Members Only (2005)

The music is composed by Pritam Chakraborty while the Lyrics are penned by Shabbir Ahmed, Amitabh Verma, Dev Kohli, Subrat Sinha and Mayur Puri.

=== Track listing ===
No.	Title	Lyrics	Music	Singer(s)	Length
1.	"Ishq Hai Jhootha"	Mayur Puri	Pritam Chakraborty	Kunal Ganjawala, Sunidhi Chauhan	3:46
2.	"Jal Jal Ke Dhuan"	Amitabh Verma	Pritam Chakraborty	Sonu Nigam, Abrar ul Haq	5:27
3.	"Yaaron"	Mayur Puri	Pritam Chakraborty	Shaan, Sonu Nigam	4:04
4.	"Akhiyan Na Maar"	Dev Kohli	Pritam Chakraborty	Sunidhi Chauhan	3:40
5.	"Nasha"	Subrat Sinha	Pritam Chakraborty	Sukhwinder Singh	3:55
6.	"Jhoom"	Shabbir Ahmed	Pritam Chakraborty	Suzanne D'Mello	4:53
7.	"Ishq Hai Jhootha" (Remix)	Mayur Puri	Pritam Chakraborty	Kunal Ganjawala, Sunidhi Chauhan	3:27
8.	"Jal Jal ke Dhuan" (Remix)	Amitabh Verma	Pritam Chakraborty	Sonu Nigam	5:32
9.	"Akhiyan Na Maar" (Remix)	Dev Kohli	Pritam Chakraborty	Sunidhi Chauhan	3:38

== Reception ==
Taran Adarsh from Bollywood Hungama gave the film 2 stars out of 5, feeling it was "too western a flick to find patronage from the Indian audiences" and had "the soul of an English film in the body of a Hindi flick". He noted the film's inspirations from two American films, Confidence and House of Games. On the contrary, Raja Sen from Rediff.com remarked the film was "not a rip-off of an English DVD you might have rented last week." However, he pointed out the film had entire sequences lifted from other films, such as Matchstick Men.
