= Sukhbir =

Sukhbir is an Indian masculine given name. Notable people with the given name include:

- Sukhbir (musician) (born 1969), Bhangra singer
- Sukhbir (writer) (1925–2012), Punjabi novelist, short-story writer, poet and essayist
- Sukhbir Kataria (born 1964), Indian politician
- Sukhbir Singh Badal (born 1962), Punjabi politician
- Sukhbir Singh Gill (1975–2024), Indian field hockey player
- Sukhbir Singh Jaunapuria (born 1957), Indian politician and businessman
- Sukhbir Singh Kapoor (born 1935), Indian writer and educator
- Sukhbir Sinha (1868–1928), politician, zamindar and Hindu Mahasabha leader
