= Billi Billi =

2023 song by Sukhbir

- Official song cover featuring Salman Khan and Pooja Hegde

Single by Sukhbir

from the album Kisi Ka Bhai Kisi Ki Jaan
- Language: Hindi; Punjabi
- Released: 2 March 2023
- Recorded: 2022
- Genre: EDM; dance; pop; Filmi
- Length: 3:21
- Label: Zee Music Company
- Composer: Sukhbir
- Lyricist: Kumaar
- Producers: DJ Dips; Supernova Muzic

Kisi Ka Bhai Kisi Ki Jaan track listing
- 1. "Yentamma"; 2. "Billi Billi"; 3. "Naiyo Lagda"; 4. "Jee Rahe The Hum (Falling in Love)"; 5. Lets Dance Chotu Motu"; 6. "Tere Bina"; 7. "Bathukamma"

Music video
- "Billi Billi" on YouTube

"Billi Billi" (transl. Cat Cat) is an Indian Hindi-language song, composed by Sukhbir, who also sung the track. Lyrics were written by Kumaar with Punjabi lyrics penned lyrics by Vicky Sandhu for the soundtrack album of the 2023 Indian film Kisi Ka Bhai Kisi Ki Jaan. The audio of the track was released on 27 February 2023. The full video song was released on 2 March 2023, as the second single from the album, through Zee Music Company.

Upon release, the song received positive reviews by audience and critics. The track "Billi Billi" created the record for reaching 40 million views, within 24 hours of its release. The track also topped the national charts, in all music and video platforms.

== Composition and lyrics ==
"Billi Billi" served as the second single to be released from the soundtrack album of Kisi Ka Bhai Kisi Ki Jaan. The track was composed and recorded by Punjabi musician Sukhbir in his first collaboration with Salman Khan. The song was written by Kumaar in Hindi with additional Punjabi lyrics penned by Vicky Sandhu. The track was produced by DJ Dips and Supernova Muzic. The track has been mixed and mastered by Mauro Caccialanza.

Sukhbir revealed that Salman Khan met him at Abu Dhabi and asked for a wedding/celebration song. He sent couple of tunes to Khan and Khan liked the "Billi Billi" which was completely written in Punjabi. Khan insisted him to use some Hindi lyrics and compose. Then Sukhbir met lyricist Kumaar to write Hindi lyrics of the song. "At other production houses, the head is in touch and tells you the requirement but in this case Salman bhai was calling me directly. After he like the song we discussed it for 27 minutes over call. I hadn't expected him to be so hands on", he added.

In an interview Sukhbir said "Salman Khan would call me to discuss lyrics and the musical bits, ask me to edit certain parts so that they make sense to the visuals of the song, and the best part was shooting of the video which was done in Mumbai. He made sure everyone was looked after and I particularly enjoyed meal times with him as it gave us an opportunity to have one on one sessions to discuss the movie amidst many jokes."

== Music video ==
The music video song, featuring visuals directly from the film, was released on 2 March 2023 on YouTube. The music video features Salman Khan and Pooja Hegde primarily, with Venkatesh, Bhumika Chawla, Raghav Juyal, Jassie Gill, Siddharth Nigam, Shehnaaz Gill, Palak Tiwari and Vinali Bhatnagar. The music video was choreographed by Jani Master.

A carnival-like set was erected at Madh Island in Mumbai for the shoot by production designer Rajat Poddarr in 8 days. The song shooting was begun on 27 November 2022, and was wrapped on 3 December 2022.

"Salman Khan feels no tension about the steps. He learns the steps on sets and performs them. Sometimes, if there's something in particular that we need to tell him then we go to his house at Galaxy Apartments and brief him about it. I think there were 300 to 500 dancers in the song. Our DOP V. Manikandan has shot the song beautifully as well" – Jani on choreographing the music video of the song. Makers released behind the scenes of the song shooting on 13 April 2023.

== Marketing and release ==
On 25 February 2023, it was reported that the makers sent cat masks to several journalists and informed them through a letter that a similar mask has been used in the song as well. The media persons have been encouraged to don the mask and create interesting and creative reels. They have been requested to participate in this unique activity which would commence on 27 February. On 27 February 2023, Khan shared the audio of the song through his social media accounts, featuring cats. Later, the casts of the film shared their photos wearing cat mask.

On 1 March, Khan posted a still from the song announcing the teaser of the song would release the same day. The teaser of the song was released by the makers on 1 March 2023. The music video of the song was released on 2 March 2023.

== Reception ==
Taru B Masand of Times Now wrote "The track is an energetic wedding number and it will definitely make you tap your feet to the beats of the song. The lyrics are in praise of his beloved, where her eyes are being compared to that of a cat's. However, it's the hilarious dance steps that take away all the limelight."

Satish Sundaresan of OTT Play wrote "The mood of the ‘Billi Billi’ track is definitely uptempo and vibrant with music and lyrics complementing each other to a ‘t’. The camera work is definitely one of the USPs of the catchy track. As the track proceeds towards the end, it is nothing less than a visual treat to see all the main star cast of the film along with the background dancers in colour coordinated costumes." A critic of ETV Bharat wrote the song is the "perfect blend of modern flair and Punjabi beats".

A critic of The Indian Express wrote "Praising a lover in a Hindi film song has been done for decades, but this one has to be perhaps the most unoriginal way in which such a potentially fun, peppy number could have been written. Kumaar, who has penned the song, seems woefully uninspired this time around."

Praising the chemistry of Khan and Hegde in the song, The Financial Express wrote "'Billi Billi' is set to establish Salman Khan as the ultimate master of dance steps, with its catchy music, energetic choreography, and Salman's electrifying performance. This song is a chartbuster as Salman Khan sets the dance floor on fire, once again!"

A critic of News18 wrote "With this song, Salman once again proves that he is not just an actor but also a master of dance steps that no one else can carry out and with unmatched flamboyance, and someone who knows how to get his fans moving and grooving to his tunes."

== Impact ==
Upon its release, the song started trending on internet and became a chartbuster. The song received positive reception from audiences, praising the music.

The hook step choreographed by Jani Master and performed by Khan and Hegde in the music video, quickly went viral, adding to the song's popularity and becoming a social media sensation. Many people have recreated the hook step (signature step) by recording their own dance performances to the song and sharing these videos across social media platforms.

Actress Rakhi Sawant danced to the song. Khan and Hegde's chemistry in the song was also highly praised. In an article, Mudit Bhatnagar of Zoom referred the song as the "party anthem of the season".

== Live performances ==
Sukhbir performed "Billi Billi" live with film's casts at The Kapil Sharma Show as part of the film's promotion. He also performed the song at film's trailer launch event and at 23rd IIFA Awards.

== Controversy ==
In May 2023, Federation of Western India Cine Employees (FWICE) banned choreographer Jani Master for hiring South Indian dancers for the song.

== Credits and personnel ==
- Sukhbir – composer, vocal
- Kumaar – lyricist
- Vicky Sandhu – additional lyricist
- Jani Master – Choreographer
- Mauro Caccialanza – mix engineer, mastering engineer

== Charts ==
Chart performances for "Billi Billi"
| Chart (2023) | Peak position |
|---|---|
| India (Billboard) Billi Billi | 9 |
