= Shabbir Ahmed (lyricist) =

Indian lyricist

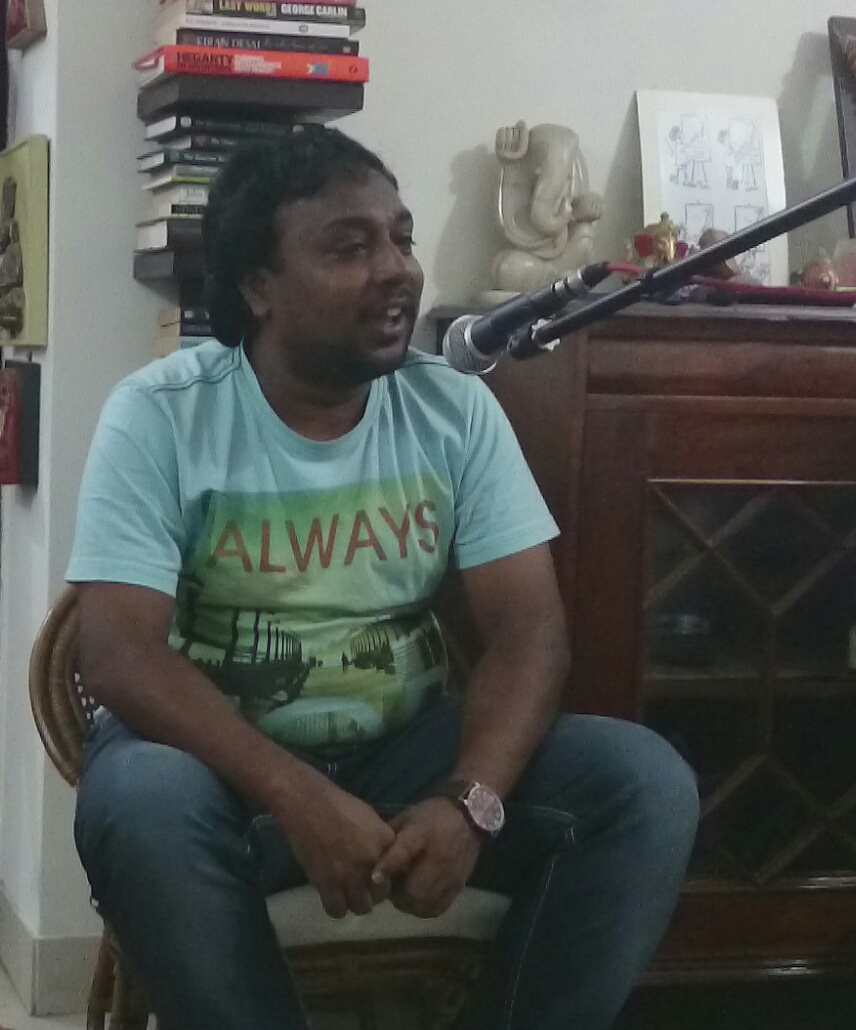
- Shabbir Ahmed reciting poetry in a poetry event organized by Poets Corner Group on 14 September 2014 in Mumbai.
- Born: Jaunpur, Uttar Pradesh
- Occupations: Lyricist, Poet, Music Composer

Shabbir Ahmed is an Indian Bollywood lyricist and music composer. He was nominated for the Lyricist of the Year at the 4th Mirchi Music Awards for the song "Teri Meri" from the film Bodyguard.

== Career ==
He made his debut as a lyricist in 2004 with his work on soundtrack of Salman Khan's Garv: Pride & Honour and has further written songs for soundtracks of films like Wanted, Kya Love Story Hai, Partner, Apna Sapna Money Money and Jodi Breakers among others. Ahmed credits his success in Bollywood to Salman Khan.

== Discography ==
=== Songwriting credits ===
| Year | Film | Song(s) | Notes |
|---|---|---|---|
| 2025 | The Bhootnii | 1 song | Also as a composer |
| 2025 | Badass Ravi Kumar | 3 songs -"Aafato Ke Daur Mein", "Bazar-E-Ishq", "Medley" | |
| 2025 | Fateh | 2 songs- "Heer", "Rona Taqdeer" | Co-lyricist Ajay Pal Sharma; Also as a composer |
| 2024 | Luv Ki Arrange Marriage | 1 song- "Ghodi" | |
| 2023 | Mission Majnu | 4 songs-"Rabba Janda", "Rabba Janda" (Reprise), "Rabba Janda" (Female Version), "Rabba Janda" (Acoustic) | |
| 2023 | Chengiz | 1 song-"Ragada" | Hindi Dubbed |
| 2023 | Kisi Ka Bhai Kisi Ki Jaan | 4 songs - "Naiyo Lagda", "Falling in Love", "Bathukamma", "Yentamma" | one with Ravi Basrur and others |
| 2023 | Bad Boy | 3 songs - "Alam Na Pucho", "Saajnaa" and "Saajnaa (Reprise)" | |
| 2023 | Chatrapathi | 1 song - "Walpaper Takley" | |
| 2023 | Fukrey 3 | 1 song - "Ve Fukrey" | |
| 2023 | Kanjoos Makhichoos | 1 song | Also as a composer |
| 2022 | Khuda Haafiz 2 | 1 song - "Junoon Hai" Along with Ayaz Kohli | Also as a composer |
| 2022 | Middle Class Love | 1 song: "Tuk Tuk" | |
| 2022 | Vikrant Rona | 1 song - Ra Ra Rakkamma | Hindi Dubbed |
| 2022 | K.G.F: Chapter 2 | 3 songs -Toofan, Mehbooba, Sulthan | Hindi Dubbed |
| 2021 | Bhavai | 6 songs- Ishq Fitoori, Siyapati Ramchandra, Kahe Muskay Re, Bansuri, Mom Ki Gudiya, Mohe Ram Rang Rang De | |
| 2020 | Baaghi 3 | 2 songs- Bhankas, Faaslon Mein | |
| 2020 | Coolie No. 1 | 1 song-Mummy Kasaam | |
| 2020 | Jawaani Jaaneman | 1 song - Ole Ole 2.0 | |
| 2020 | Street Dancer 3D | 1 song- Muqabla | Along with Tanishk Bagchi |
| 2020 | Happy Hardy and Heer | 4 songs- Cutie pie, Ishqbaaziyaan, Teri Meri Kahani, Keh Rahi Hai Nazdeekiyan | |
| 2019 | Romeo Akbar Walter | 2 songs- "Vande Mataram", "Allah Hu Allah" | Also as a composer |
| 2019 | Khandaani Shafakhana | 1 song- Dil Jaaniye | |
| 2019 | Jabariya Jodi | 1 song- Zilla Hilela | |
| 2019 | Hume Tumse Pyaar Kitna | 3 song - "Barish", "Manmohini", "Hume Tumse Pyaar Kitna" | |
| 2019 | Fraud Saiyaan | 1 song - "Chamma Chamma" (Along with Ikka) | |
| 2019 | Hum Chaar | 5 song - "Auliya", "Manmeet Mere", "Tum Aesi Kyun Ho", "Gussa Tera Jayaz Hai", "Duffermasti" | |
| 2019 | Dream Girl | 1 song - "Ik Mulaqaat" | |
| 2018 | Simmba | 2 song- "Aankh Maarey" and "Aala Re Aala Simmba Aala" | |
| 2018 | Kaashi in Search of Ganga | 4 song- "Bam Bam Bole Kaashi", "Bam Bam Bole Kaashi- Reprise", "Tujhe Dhoond Raha Dil", "Ranjha" | |
| 2018 | Baazaar | 3 song-"Kem Cho" (Along with Ikka), "Chodd Diya" and "Chodd Diya (Unplugged)" | |
| 2018 | Bhaiaji Superhit | 1 song- "Om Namah Shivay" | |
| 2018 | Loveyatri | 6 songs- "Dholida", "Chogada" and "Chogada (Unplugged)" (Along with Darshan Raval), "Tera Hua" and "Tera Hua (Unplugged)" (along with Manoj Muntashir and Arafat Mehmood), "Rangtaari" (Along with Yo Yo Honey Singh and Hommie Dilliwala) | |
| 2018 | Genius | 2 songs- "Tujhse Kahan Judaa Hoon Main" & "Pyaar Le Pyaar De" | |
| 2018 | Satyameva Jayate | 1 song- "Dilbar" (Along with Ikka) | |
| 2018 | Race 3 | 1 song- "Allah Duhai Hai" (Along with Raja Kumari) | |
| 2018 | Hate Story 4 | 1 song- "Naam Hai Mera" | |
| 2017 | Badrinath Ki Dulhania | 2 songs- "Aashiq Surrender Hua", "Badri Ki Dulhania" | |
| 2017 | Jolly LL B 2 | 1 song- "Jolly Good Fellow" | |
| 2017 | Mangal Ho | 1 song- "Mangal Ho" | |
| 2016 | Tutak Tutak Tutiya | 2 songs- "Tutak Tutak Tutiya", "Rail Gaddi" | Hindi Dubbed |
| 2016 | One Night Stand | 1 song- "Ijazat" | |
| 2016 | Teraa Surroor | 1 song- "Teri Yaad" | |
| 2016 | Sanam Teri Kasam | 1 song- "Tera Chehra" | |
| 2015 | Hate Story 3 | 2 songs- "Neendein Khul Jaati Hain", "Love To Hate You" | |
| 2015 | Kis Kisko Pyaar Karoon | | |
| 2015 | Welcome Back | 1 song- "20-20". co-lyricist Manoj Muntashir | |
| 2015 | Lateef | 2 song- "Chain Milta Nahien", "Kash Me" | |
| 2015 | Bajrangi Bhaijaan | 1 song- "Aaj Ke Party" | |
| 2015 | Badmashiyaan | All Songs | |
| 2015 | All Is Well | 2 songs- "Baaton Ko Teri", "Hafte Mein Chaar Shaneevar" | |
| 2014 | Action Jackson | 1 song- "Keeda" | |
| 2014 | The Shaukeens | 1 song- "Ishq Kutta Hai" | |
| 2014 | Humshakals | 2 songs- "Piya Ke Bazaar Mein", "Khol De Dil Ki Khidki" | |
| 2014 | Kick | 1 song- "Jumme Ki Raat". co-lyricist Kumaar | |
| 2014 | Singham Returns | 1 song- "Singham Returns" | |
| 2014 | The Xposé | 1 song- "Ice Cream Khaungi" | |
| 2014 | Jai Ho | 2 songs- "Tumko To Aana Hi Tha", "Jai Ho" | |
| 2014 | Mumbai Can Dance Saala | 2 songs- "De Di Permission", "Shake My Kamariya" | |
| 2013 | Policegiri | 4 songs- "Tirat Meri Tu Rab Mera Tu", "Chura Ke Leja", "Jhoom Barabar Jhoom", "Policegiri" | |
| 2013 | Sooper Se Ooper | 2 songs- "Intaducing Gul", "Sapna Mera, Is This Love" | |
| 2013 | Shortcut Romeo | 1 song- "Khali Salam Dua Mulakat" | |
| 2013 | Kash Tum Hote | 4 songs- "Betaab Tamanna Thi", "Dhoop Mein Zindagi", "Reshma Ki Jawani" , "Agar Maangon Tum Ye Dil" | |
| 2013 | Enemmy | 1 song- "Katrina Ko Kareena Ko Pani Pani Pani Kam Chai" | |
| 2013 | Main Krishna Hoon | All Songs | |
| 2013 | Zanjeer | 4 songs- "Pinky Hain Paise Waalo Ki", "Hum Hai Mumbai Ke Hero", "Khochey Pathan Ki", "Kaatilana" | |
| 2013 | Zila Ghaziabad | All Songs | |
| 2013 | Zindagi 50-50 | 3 songs- "Rabba", "Tu Samne Jo Aaye", "Toh Se Naina" | |
| 2013 | Special 26 | 1 song- "Gore Mukhde Pe Zulfo Ki Chaya" | |
| 2013 | Bullett Raja | 1 song- "Jai Govinda, Jai Gopala" | |
| 2012 | Tezz | 2 songs- "Laila Main Toh Sabki Hoon Laila", "Main Hoon Shab" | |
| 2012 | Khiladi 786 | 4 songs- "Khiladi Bhaiyya", "Jo Tenu Vekheya", "Lonely", "Tu Hur Pari Hai Lajavab" | |
| 2012 | Life's Good | | |
| 2012 | Bol Bachchan | 1 song- "Chalao Na Naino Se Baan Re" | |
| 2012 | OMG – Oh My God! | 1 song- "Go Go Govinda" | |
| 2012 | Son of Sardaar | 2 songs- "Po Po", "Son Of Sardaar" | |
| 2012 | Kismat Love Paisa Dilli | 3 songs- "Dhishkiyao Nazro Se", "Kuch Milan Milane Ka", "Don't Fuff My Mind" | |
| 2012 | Department | 2 songs- "Kammo Kammo", "Mumbai Police Hai Sab Ka Bhai" | |
| 2012 | Maximum | 4 songs- "Dil Toh Hai Ishq Ka Makan", "Maula Mere Maula", "Sutta Hai Sutta" | |
| 2012 | Will You Marry Me? | 4 songs- "Soniya", "Danke Ke Chot Pe", "Tu Hai Main Hoon Raat Hai" , "We..are The Superman" | |
| 2012 | Dangerous Ishhq | 5 songs- "Tu Hi Rab Tu Hi Dua", "Naina Re", "Ishq Mein Ruswaa", "Lagan Lagi More Piya" , "Umeed Hai" | |
| 2011 | Damadamm! | 1 song- "Bas Ik Vari Aaja Ve" | |
| 2011 | Bodyguard | All Songs. co-lyricist Neelesh Misra | |
| 2011 | Chalo Dilli | 2 songs- "Kaun Si Badi Baat", "Gimme a High 5" | |
| 2011 | Loot | 2 songs- "Ajab Hulchul Si Kyun", "Ek Pata Ya Do Pata Ke" | |
| 2011 | Aseema - Beyond Boundaries | All Songs. co-lyricist Satyakam Mohanty, Manoj Darpan | |
| 2011 | Yeh Dooriyan | 1 song- "Ringa Ringa Roses" | |
| 2011 | Angel | All Songs | |
| 2010 | Rakta Charitra 2 | 1 song- "Maar De Jo Bhi Tujhse Takrayega" | |
| 2010 | Rakta Charitra | 1 song- "Jo Bhi Tujh Se" | |
| 2010 | Click | All Songs | |
| 2010 | No Problem | 1 song- "No Problem Everybody Say, No problem". co-lyricist Kummar | |
| 2010 | My Friend Ganesha 3 | | |
| 2010 | Mittal v/s Mittal | All Songs | |
| 2010 | Hello Darling | 3 songs- "Attrah Baras Ki", "Aa Jaane Jaan", "We Are Working Girls" | |
| 2010 | Toh Baat Pakki! | 2 song- "Main Khud Se Bhi", "Dil Le Jaa" | |
| 2009 | Benny and Babloo | 2 songs- "Jab Se Dil Diya Hai", "Dolly". co-lyricist Panchhi Jalonvi | |
| 2009 | Bal Ganesh 2 | | |
| 2009 | Runway | All Songs | |
| 2009 | Chintu Ji | 1 song- "Vote For Chintu Ji" | |
| 2009 | Team - The Force | 1 song- "Chika Chika Boom" | |
| 2009 | Dhoondte Reh Jaaoge | 3 songs- "Apane Ko Paisa Chaahiye", "Salma O Salma", "Pal Woh Aanewaala Pal" | |
| 2009 | Ek: The Power of One | 3 songs, - "Sambhale", "Sona Lagda", "Tum Saath Ho" | |
| 2009 | Luck | 4 songs- "Khudaaya Ve", "Aazama Luck Aazama", "Aazma (Luck Is The Key)", "Laga Le" | |
| 2009 | Wanted | 2 songs- "Le Le Le Maza Le", "Tose Pyaar Karate Hai Gori" | |
| 2009 | Kisse Pyaar Karoon | 2 songs- "Aahoon Aahoon", "Kisse Pyaar Karu" | |
| 2009 | 99 | 1 song- "Milte Hai Roj Roj" | |
| 2009 | Fast Forward | All Songs. co-lyricist Irshad Kamil | |
| 2008 | C Kkompany | 2 songs- "Jaane Kya Ho Gaya Mujhko", "Khokha" | |
| 2008 | EMI | 1 song- "EMI". co-lyricist Hamza Faruqui | |
| 2008 | Bombay to Bangkok | 3 songs- "Dheere Dheere Chal", "Dil Ka Hal Sune Dil Wala", "We Are Same Same But Different" | |
| 2008 | Mission Istaanbul | 1 song- "World Hold On" | |
| 2008 | God Tussi Great Ho | 2 songs- "Tujhe Aksa Beach Ghuma Du", "O God Tussi Great Ho" | |
| 2008 | Kismat Konnection | 4 songs- "Soniye Ve Dhak", "Move Your Body Now", "Aai Papi Aai Papi" , "Dhak Dhak Dhak Dil Dhadke" | |
| 2008 | Superstar | 4 songs- "Ajnabi Khwab Mein", "Man Tu Talbat, Tu Man Talbat", "Aankho Se Khwab Ruth Kar" , "Rafa Dafa" | |
| 2008 | Haal-e-Dil | All Songs | |
| 2007 | Welcome | 1 song- "Welcome" | |
| 2007 | Kya Love Story Hai | All Songs | |
| 2007 | Bal Ganesh | 2 songs- "Nanha Munna Bal Ganesh", "Gana Gana Di Gana " | |
| 2007 | Partner | 3 songs- "Sonee De Nakhre", "Duppatta Teraa", "You Are My Love" | |
| 2007 | Nehlle Pe Dehlla | 1 song- "Nehle Pe Dehla" | |
| 2006 | Jawani Diwani: A Youthful Joyride | 6 songs- "Yaad Teri Yaad Jab Aati Hai", "Dil Deewana Ho Gaya Hain", "Dilruba Hai Dilruba", "Ishk Mein Tere Ishk Mein", "Jawani Diwani", "Jiska Mujhe Intezar Hain" | |
| 2006 | Apna Sapna Money Money | 6 songs- "Gustakh Nigah", "Jai Jai Money", "Ye Ganapat Baja", "Paisa Paisa" , "Sania Badnam" | |
| 2006 | Shaadi Karke Phas Gaya Yaar | 1 song- "Deewane Dil Ko" | |
| 2006 | Dhadkanein | All Songs. co-lyricist Farhad | |
| 2005 | Ek Khiladi Ek Haseena | 2 songs- "Sara Jahan", "Jhum Baho Mein" | |
| 2005 | Jalwa: Fun in Love | All Songs. co-lyricists Arun Malik, Asad Ajmeri | |
| 2005 | Kaal | 2 songs- "Iss Kal Kal Me Ham", "Tauba Tauba Ishq Main Kariya" | |
| 2004 | Mission Mumbai: A Novel of Sacred Cows | 1 song- "Mumbai Mein Aake" | |
| 2004 | Garv | Debut film soundtrack as lyricist | |

=== Music video ===
| Year | Song | Singer | Notes |
|---|---|---|---|
| 2015 | Super Girl From China | Kanika Kapoor | |
| 2015 | Teddy Bear | Kanika Kapoor | |
| 2025 | Kamariya Pe Saree | Pawan Singh | |

=== Albums ===
| Year | Album | Artist | Notes |
|---|---|---|---|
| 2003 | Saajna | Shweta Shetty | All Songs. co-lyricist Shweta Shetty, Yashpal Tanwar, Shashikant Mishra |
| 2008 | Khwaishein | Aneek Dhar | 3 songs- "Khwaaishein", "Aao Na, Aake Na Phir Jaao Na" , "Aao Na, Aake Na Phir Jaao Na" |
| 2014 | Armaan | Armaan Malik | 1 song- "Kyo" |
| 2021 | Himesh Ke Dil Se | Music Composed by Himesh Reshammiya sung by Various Artists | 3 songs- "Piya Ji Ke Sanng", "Mehendi Ka Ranngg", "Terri Aashiqui Ne Maarraa" |

== Personal life ==
Shabbir Ahmed was born in Jaunpur district of Uttar Pradesh and he got his basic education there. Later he moved to Mumbai for his livelihood. He married Shumaila Ahmed on 13 May 2014 and held a reception at Mumbai’s Lokhandwala Celebration Club on 14 May 2014.

== Accolades ==
| Award Ceremony | Category | Recipient | Result | Reference(s) |
|---|---|---|---|---|
| 4th Mirchi Music Awards | Album of The Year | Bodyguard | Nominated | |
| 4th Mirchi Music Awards | Lyricist of The Year | "Teri Meri" from Bodyguard | Nominated | |
