= Kisi Ka Bhai Kisi Ki Jaan =

2023 Indian film by Farhad Samji

- Theatrical Release Poster
- Directed by: Farhad Samji
- Written by: Farhad Samji; Sparsh Khetarpal; Tasha Bhambra
- Story by: Siva; Bhoopathi Raja
- Based on: Veeram by Siva
- Produced by: Salman Khan
- Starring: Salman Khan; Venkatesh; Pooja Hegde
- Cinematography: V. Manikandan
- Edited by: Mayuresh Sawant
- Music by: Score: Ravi Basrur; Songs: Ravi Basrur; Himesh Reshammiya; Devi Sri Prasad; Sajid Khan; Sukhbir; Payal Dev; Amaal Mallik
- Production company: Salman Khan Films
- Distributed by: Zee Studios
- Release date: 21 April 2023
- Running time: 144 minutes
- Country: India
- Language: Hindi
- Budget: ₹100 crore
- Box office: ₹182 crore

Kisi Ka Bhai Kisi Ki Jaan (transl. Someone's Brother, Someone's Lover), also known by the initialism KBKJ, is a 2023 Indian Hindi-language action comedy film directed by Farhad Samji and produced by Salman Khan Films. The film, a remake of the 2014 Tamil film Veeram, stars Salman Khan, Venkatesh and Pooja Hegde.

Principal photography began in May 2022 and ended in February 2023 with filming taking place in Mumbai, Hyderabad and Ladakh. Ravi Basrur composed the musical score. The soundtrack was composed by Basrur, alongside Himesh Reshammiya, Devi Sri Prasad, Sajid Khan, Sukhbir, Payal Dev and Amaal Mallik. The cinematography and editing were handled by V. Manikandan and Mayuresh Sawant.

Kisi Ka Bhai Kisi Ki Jaan was released on 21 April 2023, coinciding with Eid. It received mixed reviews from critics and was an average grosser at the box office, grossing over ₹182 crore against a budget of ₹100 crore.

== Plot ==
Bhaijaan lives with his three brothers, Ishq, Moh, and Luv, in a housing colony in Delhi. Frequently involved in fights, he opposes marriage, fearing that a wife could disrupt the harmony among his brothers. Although the younger brothers pretend to share his views, they are secretly in relationships with Sukun, Muskaan, and Chahat.

The brothers learn from Nadeem Chacha that Bhaijaan was once in love with Bhagyalakshmi, known as Bhagya. They attempt to reunite the couple but discover that Bhagya is now married and has a son, Abhimanyu. Believing Bhaijaan to be more attached to the name than to the woman herself, they search for another Bhagyalakshmi. They find Gundamaneni Bhagyalakshmi, a Telugu-speaking woman who has recently moved into their neighborhood, and arrange for her and Bhaijaan to fall in love. Meanwhile, Bhaijaan foils an attack on the colony planned by MLA Mahavir.

While traveling with Bhagya to her village in Telangana, Bhaijaan learns that her brother, Gundamaneni Balakrishna, despises violence. When goons attack their train, Bhaijaan fights them off, shocking Bhagya, who had believed him to be nonviolent. She also discovers that she was the attackers' primary target. Bhaijaan learns that the goons work for Kodati Nageshwara, who seeks to kill Balakrishna and his family and had previously enlisted Mahavir to eliminate Bhagya.

Bhaijaan and his brothers promise to protect Bhagya's family and arrive in her village clean-shaven. Bhaijaan tries to negotiate a peaceful resolution with Nageshwara, but he refuses. After Bhaijaan thwarts another attack on the family, he reveals the cause of their feud. Nageshwara's father, Rameshwara, had used his coffee factory to supply narcotics. Balakrishna, once a violent criminal known as 'Rowdy Anna', had filed a complaint against Rameshwara, ruining his reputation and contributing to his death. Having witnessed his father's death, Nageshwara vowed revenge on Balakrishna, who later renounced violence to protect Bhagya and his family. Balakrishna attempts to end the feud by seeking Nageshwara's forgiveness, but Nageshwara remains determined to retaliate.

Nageshwara subsequently attempts to attack Balakrishna and his family at their home, only to discover that Bhaijaan has moved them to his colony for protection. As Bhaijaan and Bhagya prepare for their engagement alongside their families, Nageshwara and Mahavir launch another attack. Bhaijaan and the reformed Balakrishna kill Nageshwara, while Bhaijaan kills Mahavir, saving his family and the colony.

== Cast ==
- Salman Khan as Bhaijaan alias Jaan
- Venkatesh as Gundamaneni Balakrishna alias "Rowdy Anna", "Annayya", Bhagya's elder brother
- Pooja Hegde as Gundamaneni Bhagyalakshmi alias Bhagya, Bhaijaan' love interest, Bala's younger sister
- Jagapathi Babu as Kodati Nageshwara
- Raghav Juyal as Ishq, Bhaijaan's brother
- Jassie Gill as Moh, Bhaijaan's brother
- Siddharth Nigam as Love, Bhaijaan's brother
- Shehnaaz Gill as Sukoon, Ishq's love interest
- Palak Tiwari as Muskaan, Moh's love interest
- Vinali Bhatnagar as Chhaahat, Luv's love interest
- Rohini Hattangadi as Gundamaneni Pushpanjali, Balakrishna and Bhagyalakshmi's mother
- Bhumika Chawla as Gundamaneni Anandini, Balakrishna's wife
- Vijender Singh as Mahavir
- Satish Kaushik as Nadeem Chacha
- Aasif Sheikh as a doctor
- Tej Sapru as Inspector
- Abhimanyu Singh as Tyagi
- Tanikella Bharani as Kodati Ramchandra, Nageshwar's father
- Amit Tiwari as Kodati Ishwar, Nageshwar's brother
- Parag Tyagi as Kodati Yogeshwar, Nageshwar's brother

=== Cameo appearances ===
- Bhagyashree as Bhagya, Bhaijaan's former love interest
- Abhimanyu Dassani
- Himalay Dassani
- Farhad Samji as a photographer in a wedding
- Ram Charan in the song, "Yentamma"
- Yo Yo Honey Singh in the song "Lets Dance Chotu Motu"

== Production ==
=== Development ===
Director Farhad Samji initially sought to remake the 2014 Tamil film Veeram as Bachchhan Paandey (previously titled Land of Lungi) with Akshay Kumar. However later, he changed the script of Bachchhan Paandey to be the remake of another Tamil film Jigarthanda instead. As Nadiadwala Grandson Entertainment held the remake rights of both the films, Samji tweaked Veeram's story and pitched it to Salman Khan who accepted the film. Later, Nadiadwala walked out of the project and gave the rights to Khan, who then decided to make the film under his banner Salman Khan Films.

The film was announced on 10 January 2020 with the title Kabhi Eid Kabhi Diwali. The film was supposed to produce by Sajid Nadiadwala under his banner Nadiadwala Grandson Entertainment, thus marking his seventh collaboration with Khan. The film was made on a production and marketing budget of around ₹125 crore (US$13 million).

Samji narrated the story to Khan in early January 2020, and agreed to do the film in the first meeting itself. However, it was later postponed for a longtime and suffered numerous pre-production delays due to the COVID-19 pandemic. However, in August 2022, the film's official title was announced as Kisi Ka Bhai Kisi Ki Jaan.

=== Pre-production ===
Nadiadwala started working on the script in January 2020. Samji began pre-production of the film in July 2021, after wrapping Bachchan Pandey. Tasha Bhambra developed the screenplay from the story given by Sparsh Khetarpal. The film's every dialogue and every scene has been written under the supervision of Khan, and some of the dialogues in the films are straightly from Khan's mind.

The songs were composed by Ravi Basrur, Himesh Reshammiya, Devi Sri Prasad, Sajid Khan, Sukhbir, Payal Dev and Amaal Mallik. The film's original background score was score by Basrur. The team further brought cinematographer V. Manikandan and stunt choreographer Anl Arasu on board. Other technicians includes editor by Mayuresh Sawant, production designer Rajat Poddar, and costume designers Ashley Rebello, Alvira Khan Agnihotri, Sanam Ratansi and Rochelle for the film. The music videos were choreographed by Jani Master, after working with Khan in Radhe (2021).

=== Casting ===
In February 2020, Pooja Hegde was confirmed as the female lead. The film marks her first collaboration with Khan. and second collaboration with Samji after Housefull 4 (2019). Samji felt that Hegde would be best fit for female lead after working with her in Housefull 4. Hegde hiked her fees for the project post the success of Housefull 4.

In December 2021, Venkatesh joined the cast, marking his comeback to Hindi cinema after Taqdeerwala (1995). Jagapathi Babu was signed in to play main antagonist role in June 2022. About his role Babu said "There was no reservation regarding the role. Bhai [Khan] wanted me to dye my hair black and look younger. This is because he has this logic and said ‘I can't fight a person who is older than me.’ So. we had to do that and nothing else. It wasn't a reservation but something that the character needed."

Jassie Gill, Siddharth Nigam and Raghav Juyal were roped in to play Khan's brothers in the film. Punjabi cinema actress Shehnaaz Gill joined the cast in April 2022. In May 2022, South Indian cinema actress Malvika Sharma joined the cast for playing a pivotal role. Newbie Palak Tiwari, who was assistant director of Antim: The Final Truth (2019) was selected to play a prominent role. Later, boxer-politician Vijender Singh was signed to play one of antagonist role. The film marks Shehnaaz Gill, Malvika Sharma, Palak Tiwari and Vijender Singh's Hindi film debut.

Aasif Sheikh was signed in to play pivotal role. Ram Charan was cast for a special appearance in a song. The film marked Satish Kaushik's posthumous release after his death. Although Tajikistani singer Abdu Rozik was shot for his portions, his part was cut from final draft as makers wanted to reshoot his portions and he couldn't join the sets as he was in Bigg Boss 16 House.

=== Filming ===
Principal photography began on 12 May 2022 in Vile Parle, Mumbai. Khan and Hegde joined the sets in the schedule, where the team shot some scenes at erected metro station in Golden Tobacco factory in Vile Parle for 10 days. Later in June, the production moved to Hyderabad for 25-days schedule. Two song was shot at Ramoji Film City, Hyderabad in this schedule.

In August 2022, a song featuring Khan and Hegde was filmed along with some portions in Ladakh. The final schedule of the film was begun in September at a specially erected set in Vile Parle with stunt choreographer duo Anbariv. An elaborate set of a hilltop was built at the Golden Tobacco factory in Mumbai for Venkatesh's introduction scene, choreographed by Anbariv. Production designer Rajat Poddarr made a village in South India with a rocky hill in the background. A separate set was built for Babu's fight sequence. Each set took more than two months to build.

A song choreographed by Jani Master was reshot with 800 background dancers in late November 2022 at constructed set at Madh Island, Mumbai. The shooting of the song was wrapped up on 3 December 2022. Hegde wrapped her portions on 3 February 2023. Khan wrapped his portions on 8 February 2023.

=== Post-production ===
Post-production of the film began simultaneously with the wrapping-up and continuation of film production. Editing and VFX works began in September 2022. In late-February 2023, it was reported that Khan completed editing first cut of the film at his brother Sohail Khan's studio in Bandra. Later, Khan held first cut screening for his friends and family. Later Khan re-edited the film with Bunty Negi. Sheikh completed his dubbing in early March 2023.

The final copy of the film was ready in April 2023, and was submitted to the Central Board of Film Certification (CBFC) that month. On 16 April 2023, the film received a U/A certificate from the Censor Board, with a finalized runtime of 144 minutes.

== Music ==
In June 2022, Bollywood Hungama reported that Ravi Basrur was approached to compose the background score and one song. The source also claimed that Devi Sri Prasad, who was earlier signed for the film, opted out of the project. Prasad, however, denied the rumors, saying that he had already composed a dance number for the film. Himesh Reshammiya, Sajid Khan, Sukhbir, Payal Dev, Devi Sri Prasad, Ravi Basrur and Amaal Mallik have been signed to compose songs as well.

The soundtrack consists of eight original songs, namely, "Naiyo Lagda", "Billi Billi", "Jee Rahe The Hum (Falling in Love)", "Bathukamma", "Yentamma", "O Balle Balle", "Lets Dance Chotu Motu", and "Tere Bina". Lyrics are written by Shabbir Ahmed, Kumaar, Devi Sri Prasad, Sajid Khan, Ravi Basrur, Vicky Sandhu, Kinnal Raj and Harini Ivaturi. The album was released by Zee Music Company on 20 April 2023, a day before the film's release.

== Marketing ==
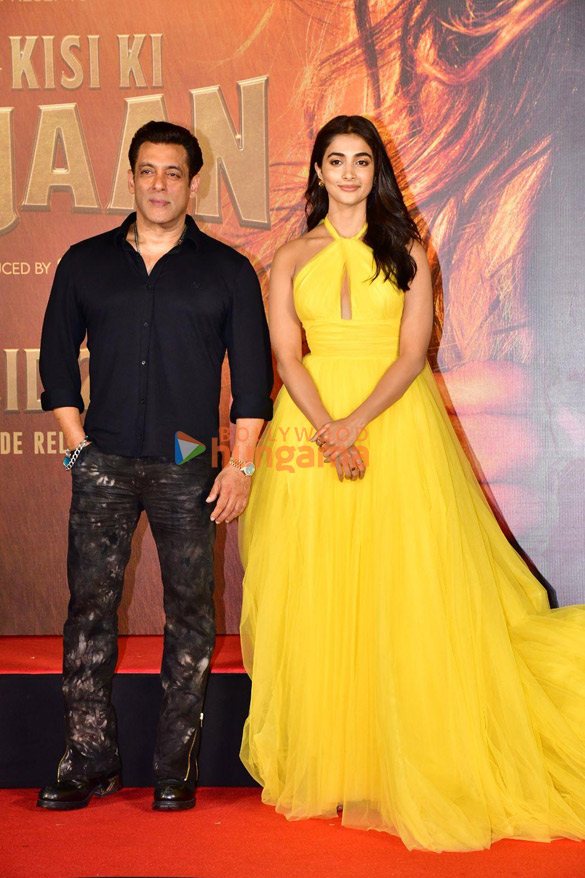
Khan and Hegde promoting the film in 2023

The film's title and first look was revealed on 26 August 2022 through an announcement video, coinciding with Khan's 34 years in Bollywood. The film's teaser was released on 25 January 2023. Subsequently, the teaser was attached to the prints of Pathaan for theatrical screenings. In March 2023, when the song "Billi Billi" was unveiled, the hook step, choreographed by Jani Master and performed by Khan and Hegde in the music video, quickly went viral, adding to the song's popularity and becoming a social media sensation. Many people have recreated the hook step (signature step) by recording their own dance performances to the song and sharing these videos across social media platforms. The official trailer of the film was released on 10 April 2023. Trailer launch event was held at a multiplex in Mumbai, where cast and crew were present.

== Release ==
=== Theatrical ===
The film was theatrically released on 21 April 2023, coinciding with Eid. The film was released in 5700 screens worldwide, which included 4500 screens in India and 1200 screens in overseas market.

The film was theatrically released in Bangladesh on 25 August 2023 and thus became the second Hindi film to be released in the country.

=== Home media ===
The film was premiered on ZEE5 from 23 June 2023.

== Reception ==
=== Critical reception ===
On the review aggregator website Rotten Tomatoes, 0% of 9 critics' reviews are positive, with an average rating of 3/10. Kisi Ka Bhai Kisi Ki Jaan received mixed reviews from both critics and audience.

Bollywood Hungama rated the film 3.5 out of 5 and wrote, "Kisi Ka Bhai Kisi Ki Jaan is a perfect Eid gift for Salman Khan's fans." Ganesh Aaglave of Firstpost rated the film 3.5 out of 5 and wrote, "Salman Khan, like always rules the screen with swag and ultimate presence with the combination of dumdaar dialogues and massy action sequences." Simran Singh of DNA India rated the film 3 out of 5 and wrote, "Kisi Ka Bhai Kisi Ki Jaan is a true-blue Salman Khan film, a complete family entertainer that his fans have expected for many years." Joyeeta Mitra Suvarna of India TV reviewed the film and wrote, "Kisi Ka Bhai Kisi Ki Jaan has all the ingredients of an entertainer-- action, drama, romance, and comedy which is the pattern of Salman Khan films. Especially Salman Khan's entry and Venkatesh's fight, and Ram Charan's cameo make it worth watching." Ronak Kotecha of The Times of India rated the film 2.5 out of 5 and wrote, "This Salman Khan starrer once again plays to the gallery for his die-hard fans. It is a larger-than-life actioner with brutal violence and tons of drama.".

Scroll.in wrote "The spread includes all the elements typical of a Salman Khan movie, but in more judicious quantities than in his previous few outings." Shubhra Gupta of The Indian Express wrote "tired, unimaginative amalgamation of every Salman Khan version". Saibal Chatterjee of NDTV wrote "a travesty of gigantic proportions". Sukanya Verma of Rediff rated the film 1 out of 5 and wrote, "Salman Khan is so neck deep in his formulaic rut that the only way he knows out is to dole out some more of the bunk." Monika Rawal Kukreja of Hindustan Times wrote "Loud and senseless, Salman Khan's cringefest makes you say, 'stop it, Bhaijaan'". Shilajit Mitra of The Hindu wrote "annoying, uninspired and full of empty odes to its fading superstar".

The Indian Express included the film as one of the worst films of 2023. Similarly, India Today included it as one of the five worst Hindi films of 2023.

=== Box office ===
Kisi Ka Bhai Kisi Ki Jaan netted ₹15.81 crore (US$1.6 million) in India and ₹9.57 crore (US$990,000) overseas taking collection to ₹25.38 crore (US$2.6 million), on its opening day. On its second day, the film grossed ₹25.75 crore (US$2.7 million) crore in India. The film grossed ₹26.61 crore (US$2.8 million) in India, in three days of its release. The film has collected over ₹100 crore (US$10 million) gross worldwide in its first three days becoming the fourth Hindi film, after Pathaan, Brahmāstra: Part One – Shiva, and Sooryavanshi, to cross the three-figure mark in the opening weekend in the post-pandemic. The film crossed ₹100 crore nett in India on 30 April, marking Khan's 16th film to do so.

As of 18 May 2023, the film has grossed ₹131.58 crore (US$14 million) in India and ₹50.86 crore (US$5.3 million) overseas for a worldwide gross collection of ₹182.44 crore (US$19 million). The film emerged as commercial success at box office.
