= Sukhbir (musician) =

Indian singer (born 1969)

Sukhbir Singh
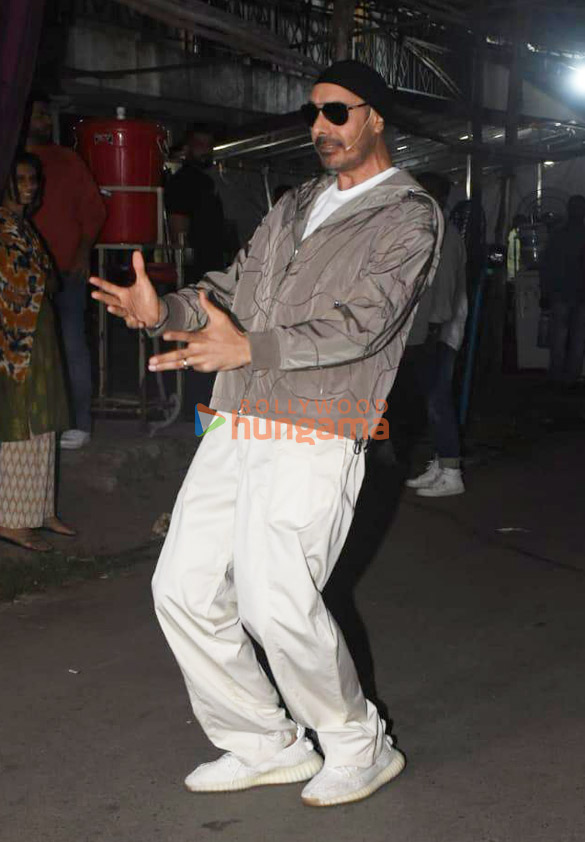
- Sukhbir in 2023

Background information
- Also known as: Prince of Bhangra
- Born: Sukhbir Singh; 9 November 1969 (age 56); Jalandhar, Punjab
- Origin: Jalandhar District, Punjab
- Musical career
- Genre: Bhangra
- Occupation: Singer
- Instruments: Vocals, Tabla, Dholak, Electric Guitar, Bass Guitar, Bongos, Harmonium, Drum kit, Piano, Violin and Saxophone
- Years active: 1995–present
- Labels: EMI, T-Series

Sukhbir Singh (born 9 November 1969) known mononymously as Sukhbir is an Indian singer, songwriter and performer. He is often referred to as the "Prince of Bhangra". His high energy Bhangra music varied from fusion styles to pure traditional Punjabi sounds. He gained fame with hits such as "Ishq Tera Tadpave" and has performed at events internationally.

== Early and personal life ==
Sukhbir Singh was born in Bhogpur, Jalandhar, Punjab, India but moved with his family to Nairobi in Kenya, and was raised there He spent 20 years in Nairobi. Sukhbir began recording in 1991 and moved to Dubai in 1992, where he has been based ever since. Sukhbir holds Kenyan citizenship, and he is fluent in Punjabi, Hindi, Urdu, Gujarati, English and Swahili languages. He always wanted to be a pilot and took flying lessons to obtain the pilot license. He is married, has twins born in 2004-05 - a son Kabir and daughter Kiran.

== Career ==
His first album. New Stylee, was recorded in Dubai and had many foreign influences. The album though, was nominated and won the 1996 Channel V Awards in three categories: Best Debut Album, Best Male Vocalist and Best Music Video (for "Punjabi Munde"). This album was followed by another, Gal Ban Gayi, and then a third called Hai Energy.Gal Ban Gayi went Platinum in 1997.

His other album, Dil Kare, includes hits such as the title song and Nachle Soniye. The video to the song 'Girls Girls Girls' features various Indian actresses, including Prachi Desai, Lara Dutta, Priyanka Chopra and Divya Chauhan.

Sukhbir's Bhangra is a fusion of Bhangra with rap, techno and reggae. The juxtaposition of these musical styles is enhanced by Sukhbir's use of original Bhangra instruments like the dhol and dholak. In Oi Triesto, his music was complemented by Spanish and Portuguese rhythms, while he also uses instruments like: tablas, congos, guitars and keyboards in his music.

He sang the song Dil Laga Na from Dhoom 2. He has also sung a song with Canadian band Josh. When the tsunami occurred he sang a song with Jassi Sidhu, Shin, DCS and Taz, stereo nation. He made a guest appearance in a 2012 Punjabi Film Pata Nahi Rabb Kehdeyan Rangan Ch Raazi as himself. He is back to singing now and his new album is Tere naal nachna. In 2021, he released the track 'Nachdi', featuring Arjun which peaked at No.4 on the Billboard Top Triller Global Charts.

He has been active in recent years as a live performer, appearing at international events. In 2025, he performed at an event in Udaipur alongside international artists such as Jennifer Lopez and DJ Tiësto.

== Discography ==
=== Single ===
- New Stylee (1996)
- Gal Ban Gayee (1997)
- Hai Energy (1999)
- Ishq Tera Tadpave (Oh Ho Ho Ho) (1999)
- Prince of Bhangra Volume 1 (2000)
- Oi! Triesto (1995)
- Dil Kare (2001)
- Sukhbir - Greatest Hits (2002)
- Tere Naal Nachna (2008)
- Nirgun Raakh Liya (2009)
- Ni Hogaya Re Pyar Soniye (2012)
- Putt Sardaran Da Pata Nahi RabKehdeain Ranga Ch Raazi (2012)
- Nachle Mere Yaar (2012)
- Gal Ban Gayi (Reworked by Meet Bros) (2016)
- Sade Dil Vich (2020)
- Nachdi (2021)

=== Hindi film song ===
- 2006 - "Dil Laga Na" - Dhoom 2
- 2017 - "Oh Ho Ho Ho" - Hindi Medium
- 2019 - "Sauda Khara Khara" - Good Newwz
- 2023 - "Billi Billi", " O Balle Balle" - Kisi Ka Bhai Kisi Ki Jaan
- 2024 - "Punjabi Munde" - Ghudchadi

== See also ==
- Sukhbir Singh Badal Dhillon, Indian politician in Punjab
- Sukhwinder Singh, bollywood playback singer
