= Romeo Akbar Walter =

2019 Indian Hindi-language spy thriller film

- Theatrical release poster
- Directed by: Robbie Grewal
- Written by: Robbie Grewal; Ishraq Eba; Shreyansh Pandey
- Produced by: Dheeraj Wadhawan; Ajay Kapoor; Vanessa Walia; Gary Grewal; Ajit Andhare
- Starring: John Abraham; Mouni Roy; Jackie Shroff; Sikandar Kher
- Cinematography: Tapan Tushar Basu
- Edited by: Hemal Kothari
- Music by: Score: Amar Mohile; Hitesh Sonik; Rochak Kohli; Clinton Cerejo; Songs: Ankit Tiwari; Sohail Sen; Shabbir Ahmed; Raaj Aashoo
- Production companies: VA Film Company; Viacom18 Motion Pictures; Kyta Productions; Red Ice Productions
- Distributed by: Eros International
- Release date: 5 April 2019
- Running time: 139 minutes
- Country: India
- Language: Hindi
- Box office: est. ₹53.48 crore

Romeo Akbar Walter (alluding to the Research & Analysis Wing) is a 2019 Indian Hindi-language spy action-thriller film written and directed by Robbie Grewal. Inspired by the life of Indian spy Ravindra Kaushik, the film stars John Abraham, Mouni Roy, Jackie Shroff, and Sikandar Kher. The narrative centers on a banker who is recruited as a spy for the Research & Analysis Wing for an undercover operation in Pakistan, where he faces both physical and emotional challenges.

Romeo Akbar Walter was theatrically released on 5 April 2019, and received mixed reviews from critics.

== Plot ==
In November 1971, an unidentified man is subjected to torture in an ISI detention cell in Karachi. The narrative then shifts to events nine months earlier.

Shrikant Rai, chief of RAW, recruits Rehamatullah Ali, a bank employee, after he successfully thwarts a staged robbery designed to assess his aptitude for espionage. Following training in combat and covert communication, Rehamatullah is sent to Pakistan under the alias Akbar Malik.

In Pakistan, Akbar infiltrates a network connected to the influential Isaq Afridi, gradually earning his trust with the help of local informants, Joker and Mudassar. He strengthens his position by demonstrating hostility toward India and by saving Afridi from an attack orchestrated by Nawab Afridi. During this time, Akbar relays intelligence to RAW about a planned attack on the village of Badlipur that could result in heavy civilian casualties.

Akbar's loyalties are tested when Nawab attempts to recruit him. Shortly afterward, he unexpectedly encounters his girlfriend, Shraddha Sharma, who reveals herself to be a RAW agent assigned to assist him. Their reunion is brief, as both remain committed to their respective missions.

Suspicion about Akbar's identity grows within the Pakistani military, particularly with Colonel Khan, who arrests and interrogates him. Although Akbar is released due to Afridi's influence, his cover is eventually compromised, forcing him to go on the run. While attempting to escape, he mistakenly shoots and kills Mudassar, who had been aiding him, leaving him emotionally shaken.

Cut off from support, Akbar contacts Shrikant Rai for extraction but is refused, as Rai believes he is becoming emotionally compromised. Meanwhile, several RAW operatives, including Shraddha, are captured, and Joker dies by suicide.

Disillusioned, Akbar appears to defect and aligns himself with Pakistani forces. To prove his loyalty, he personally leads an attack on Badlipur under Colonel Khan's supervision, destroying the village. This act seemingly confirms his allegiance to Pakistan and contributes to the escalation of hostilities leading to the Indo-Pakistani War of 1971.

Ten years later, Akbar—now known as Walter Khan and serving as a Pakistani officer—meets Shrikant Rai and his colleague Awasthi in Nepal. After he departs, Rai reveals that Walter never betrayed India; his actions were part of a long-term covert strategy. The evacuation of Badlipur had been arranged in advance, ensuring no civilian casualties.

Rai further explains that Walter remained deeply committed to his mission, even at the cost of personal sacrifices, including missing his mother's funeral. The film concludes with Walter saluting the Indian flag in private, reflecting his enduring loyalty and the emotional toll of his service.

== Cast ==
- John Abraham as Rehmuthallah "Romeo" Ali aka Akbar Malik aka Walter Khan
- Mouni Roy as Parul / Shraddha Sharma
- Jackie Shroff as Shrikant Rai, Chief of R&AW
- Anil George as Isaq Afridi
- Raghubir Yadav as Mudassar
- Sikandar Kher as Colonel Khan
- Alka Amin as Waheeda
- Shivraj Walvekar as Mishra Ji
- Purnendu Bhattacharya as General Jahangir Alam
- Aashit Chatterjee as Lt. General Ghazi Ali Hayat
- Gyanendra Tripathi as Captain Adil
- Suchitra Krishnamoorthi as Rehana Kazmi
- Shadaab Khan as Nawab Afridi
- Rajesh Shringarpure as Prasoon Awasthi, Deputy Chief of R&AW
- Mushtaq Kak as Joker
- Sanjeev Jaiswal as Deewan

== Production ==
=== Casting ===
Sushant Singh Rajput was originally cast in the lead role and even appeared in the film's first look. However, he later withdrew due to scheduling conflicts and was subsequently replaced by John Abraham.

=== Filming ===
Principal photography took place across 14 cities in India and Nepal, with significant portions shot in Gujarat, to replicate 1970s Pakistan and India, and Kashmir.

== Reception ==
=== Critical response ===
Saibal Chatterjee of NDTV gave 2 out of 5 stars, calling it too much of a burden for John Abraham to carry. Shubhra Gupta of The Indian Express gave 2 out of 5 stars, writing "The John Abraham starrer suffers from length, and the pall of dullness that hangs over proceedings. A spy needs to be patriot. That's why he does what he does, knowing thet he is 'deniable'. Devansh Sharma of Firstpost gave 2.75/5 stars, calling it an inconsistent spy-thriller that suffers from Major Raazi hangover. The Economic Times gave 3 out of 5 stars, calling it a "half-baked, spy thriller". Suparna Sharma of Deccan Chronicle wrote that "Romeo Akbar Walter is suffused with ardent desh bhakti sentiment, but itâ€™s not offensive. Itâ€™s not overtly jingoistic". Udita Jhunjunwala of the Mint calling it a period film that is high on detail but low on fluency.

=== Box office ===
Romeo Akbar Walter collected ₹5 crore on its opening day. In its opening weekend, it collected ₹22.70 crore.

== Music ==
Romeo Akbar Walter

Soundtrack album by Ankit Tiwari, Sohail Sen, Shabbir Ahmed and Raaj Aashoo
- Released: 5 March 2019
- Recorded: 2018
- Genre: Feature film soundtrack
- Length: 27:12
- Language: Hindi
- Label: Junglee Music

Ankit Tiwari chronology
Amavas (2019)	Romeo Akbar Walter (2019)	Batla House (2019)

Sohail Sen chronology
Fraud Saiyaan (2019)	Romeo Akbar Walter (2019)	Housefull 4 (2019)

Raaj Aashoo chronology
Hum Chaar (2019)	Romeo Akbar Walter (2019)

The music of the film is composed by Ankit Tiwari, Sohail Sen, Shabbir Ahmed and Raaj Aashoo with lyrics written by Shabbir Ahmed, Murli Agarwal, Prince Dubey and Ashok Punjabi. A version of the song "Jee Len De" sung by Atif Aslam was released on 26 May 2021.

Track listing
No.	Title	Lyrics	Music	Singer(s)	Length
1.	"Vande Mataram"	Shabbir Ahmed	Shabbir Ahmed	Sonu Nigam, Ekta Kapoor	4:57
2.	"Bulleya"	Ashok Punjabi	Sohail Sen	Rabbi Shergill, Shahid Mallya	4:25
3.	"Jee Len De"	Murli Agarwal	Raaj Aashoo	Mohit Chauhan	4:37
4.	"Allah Hoo Allah"	Shabbir Ahmed	Shabbir Ahmed	Sameer Khan, Maneesh Singh, Shreyas Puranik, Jay Mehta, Mayur Sakhare, Tejas Mahure	6:37
5.	"Maa"	Prince Dubey	Ankit Tiwari	Ankit Tiwari	3:19
6.	"Jee Len De" (Atif Version)	Murli Agarwal	Raaj Aashoo	Atif Aslam	4:37
Total length:					27:12
