= Nikamma =

2022 Indian film by Sabbir Khan

- Theatrical release poster
- Directed by: Sabbir Khan
- Written by: Venu Sriram
- Screenplay by: Sabbir Khan
- Based on: Middle Class Abbayi (2017) by Venu Sriram
- Produced by: Sony Pictures International Productions; Sabbir Khan
- Starring: Abhimanyu Dassani; Shirley Setia; Shilpa Shetty
- Cinematography: Hari K. Vedantam
- Edited by: Manan Ajay Sagar
- Music by: Score: John Stewart Eduri; Songs: Amaal Malik; Javed-Mohsin; Vipin Patwa; Gourov Dasgupta
- Production companies: Sony Pictures International Productions; Sabbir Khan Films
- Distributed by: Sony Pictures Releasing International
- Release date: 17 June 2022
- Running time: 148 minutes
- Country: India
- Language: Hindi
- Budget: ₹22 crore
- Box office: est. ₹1.77 crore

Nikamma (transl. Useless) is a 2022 Indian Hindi-language action comedy film directed by Sabbir Khan. It is a remake of the 2017 Telugu film Middle Class Abbayi and stars Abhimanyu Dassani, Shirley Setia and Shilpa Shetty. Nikamma was released theatrically on 17 June 2022 and received overwhelmingly negative reviews from critics and the audience. The film was also a box-office bomb.

== Plot ==
Adi is an unemployed youth with an eidetic memory, having issues with his elder brother Raman as he dotes on Avni, Raman's wife (Adi's sister-in-law) and a RTO officer. He consequently left home 15 months ago and has since been staying with his paternal uncle. Raman soon summons Adi and tells him to accompany Avni, who is transferred to Dhamli for two months as Raman is transferred to Bangalore. Avni compels Adi to do all the household chores, much to his annoyance. Adi tries to appoint a maid for house chores but Avni denies. She tries to pursue Adi to become a software engineer, but to no avail. One day, Adi bumps into Natasha aka Nikki, who instantly proposes to Adi. Adi is taken aback and falls for Nikki. Soon, it is revealed that Nikki is Avni's cousin and comes to live with her. Adi later finds out Nikki's real identity and also that she had been seeing Adi since Avni and Raman's wedding. Avni learns about Adi and Nikki's romance and sends Nikki home. Adi soon gets frustrated and wants to go back with his uncle who comes to visit. However, he learns from the latter that it was Raman's decision to send him away from home and not Avni's, as Raman wanted his brother to become more responsible. Avni made him do all the chores and chopping for cooking to make him realise the essence of hardwork. Moreover, she sent Nikki home as she is planning to send a marriage proposal to her family for Adi. For this, she wanted Adi to take a decent job and even decided to sell her land to buy a house for Adi. She still didn't take a child as she considers Adi as her elder child and wishes to see him settle down first.

On the other hand, Avni earns the enmity of MLA Vikramjeet Bisht, who runs a taxi service called Super. He floods the roads with his cabs to expand his business. When the bus service association raises an objection, he sets fire to one of the buses, killing 40 people. Avni takes action against Vikramjeet and seizes his illegal cabs. This enrages Vikramjeet, who goes to the RTO office to kill her. At the same moment, Adi (who has learnt Avni's sacrifices for his sake) thrashes him in public and warns him. Soon, Nikki's father denies Avni's marriage proposal of Adi and Nikki due to Adi's enmity to Vikramjeet. Avni takes Adi to Vikramjeet's house and makes him apologise to Vikramjeet for his actions. But, Adi and Vikramjeet agree to bet on Avni's life without letting anyone know about this. Vikramjeet challenges Adi that he will get Avni killed within six days, and plans various strategies to murder her, only for Adi to intelligently save her each time. Vikramjeet secretly invites Raman in Dhamli to stop Adi from sending Avni to Banglore. The next day, after their second marriage anniversary celebration, Avni goes missing. Meanwhile, Vikramjeet secretly kidnaps and hides Raman in one of his four cabs which Avni seized. Adi rushes to Vikramjeet's house to ask Avni's whereabouts but to his surprise Vikramjeet himself is unaware that Avni's missing. Surprising everyone, Avni arrives in a police uniform along with a police force. It is revealed that Avni is an IPS officer who is assigned a secret mission to collect proof against Vikramjeet for his misdeeds. They had already collected the footage of Vikramjeet killing a retired major which can be used against him in court and as the reason of his suspension from the upcoming MLA election. Soon, the video is spread to the media. Unable to accept his defeat, Vikramjeet shoots himself revealing Raman's kidnapping but doesn't say where he is held captive, since he thinks losing Raman will be Adi and Avni's biggest loss and his biggest victory. Soon, he is taken to the hospital but is shifted to the coma ward. Adi finally figures out Raman's location and saves him with the help of Avni. Adi and Nikki get reunited. During the end credits, the whole family is enjoying and laughing at Adi as Avni again refuses to replace Adi with a maid to do house chores. A mid-credit scene shows Vikramjeet's eyes opening up as the screen cuts to black.

== Cast ==
- Abhimanyu Dassani as Aditya “Adi” Singh
- Shirley Setia as Natasha "Nikki"
- Shilpa Shetty as Avni Raman Singh
- Samir Soni as Raman Singh
- Abhimanyu Singh as MLA Vikramjeet “Vikram” Bisht
- Naren Kumar as Tipu
- Rohit Kumar as Omi
- Sachin Khedekar as Nagendra Singh
- Sudesh Lehri as Suresh Trivedi
- Vikram Gokhale as Yashwanth (Retired Indian Army Major)
- Sammratt Kapoor as Darshi

== Production ==
=== Development ===
Nikamma was announced in June 2019. It is a remake of 2017 Telugu film Middle Class Abbayi starring Nani.

=== Filming ===
Principal photography kicked off in July 2019, and Shetty joined the sets next month. The shooting was stopped in March 2020 owing to COVID-19 pandemic in India, before resuming in October 2020 and wrapping up in first week of November 2020.

=== Home media ===
The post-theatrical digital streaming rights were acquired by Netflix and was premiered on Netflix on 14 August 2022.

== Music ==
Nikamma

Soundtrack album by Amaal Malik, Javed-Mohsin, Vipin Patwa and Gourov Dasgupta
- Released: 3 June 2022
- Length: 21:22
- Labels: Sony Music India (Nikamma Title Track); Zee Music Company (All Songs)
- Producer: Sabbir Khan

Official audio
- Nikamma - Full Album on YouTube

The music of the film is composed by Amaal Mallik, Javed–Mohsin, Vipin Patwa and Gourov Dasgupta with lyrics written by Danish Sabri, Shabbir Khan, Kumaar and Sanjay Chhel.

The song "Nikamma" was recreated by Javed–Mohsin from the track "Nikamma Kiya Is Dil Ne" for the 2002 film Kyaa Dil Ne Kahaa which was sung by Shaan, Sanjivani Bhelande and written by Sanjay Chhel.

Track listing
No.	Title	Lyrics	Music	Singer(s)	Length
1.	"Nikamma"	Danish Sabri, Sanjay Chhel	Javed–Mohsin	Dev Negi, Payal Dev, Deane Sequeira, Javed-Mohsin	2:48
2.	"Tere Bin Kya"	Kumaar	Gourov Dasgupta	Dev Negi, Shruti Rane	3:20
3.	"Killer"	Kumaar	Amaal Mallik	Mika Singh, Amaal Mallik	4:06
4.	"Nasha Ishq Ka"	Kumaar	Vipin Patwa	Stebin Ben, Neha Karode	4:06
5.	"Ab Meri Baari"	Sabbir Khan, Danish Sabri	Javed–Mohsin	Farhad Bhiwandiwala, Javed–Mohsin	3:00
6.	"Tere Bin Kya" (Reprise)	Kumaar	Gourov Dasgupta	Shirley Setia, Mame Khan	4:02
Total length:					21:22

== Release ==
Nikamma was released on 17 June 2022.

== Reception ==
Nikamma received mostly negative reviews from critics and audience. On the review aggregator website Rotten Tomatoes, 0% of 6 critics' reviews are positive, with an average rating of 3/10.

Shubhra Gupta of The Indian Express gave 0.5 out of 5 stars and wrote, "This Abhimanyu Dassani-Shilpa Shetty starrer is a film so moth-balled that it would have been roundly rejected even in the 80s." BH Harsh of Firstpost gave 1.5 out of 5 stars and wrote, "It wouldn't be an exaggeration to say that amongst all the genres Hindi Cinema has ever birthed or embraced, the 'Masala film' genre remains the most employed and yet the most misunderstood." Rachana Dubey of The Times of India gave 2 out of 5 stars and wrote, "Overall, the film could have done a lot if the writing was more clearly structured, the editing tighter and the direction a lot more focussed on finer details of the story and characters." Saibal Chatterjee of NDTV gave 1 out of 5 stars and wrote, "Abhimanyu Dassani struggles to rise above the script. Shirely Setia is a fetching presence but she has some way to go before she can be regarded as a finished article."

=== Box office ===
Nikamma was released in 1250 Screens. It earned only ₹51 Lakh' box office on its opening day.
