= Feels Like Home =

Feels Like Home may refer to:

== Albums ==
- Feels like Home (Cassandra Vasik album), 1993
- Feels like Home (Linda Ronstadt album), 1995
- Feels like Home (Norah Jones album), 2004
- Feels like Home (Sheryl Crow album), 2013

== Songs ==
- "Feels like Home" (Bea Miller and Jessie Reyez song), 2019
- "Feels like Home" (Sigala song), 2018
- "Feels like Home" (Randy Newman song), 1995, performed by Bonnie Raitt, Linda Ronstadt and others
- "Feels Like Home", a song by LeAnn Rimes from the album Sittin' on Top of the World
- "Feels Like Home", a song by Newton Faulkner from the album Hand Built by Robots
- "Feels Like Home", a song by Meck
- "Feels Like Home", a song by Backstreet Boys from the album In a World Like This

== Other ==
- Feels Like Home (web series), 2022 comedy-drama web series
