= Shirley Setia =

New Zealand singer and actress

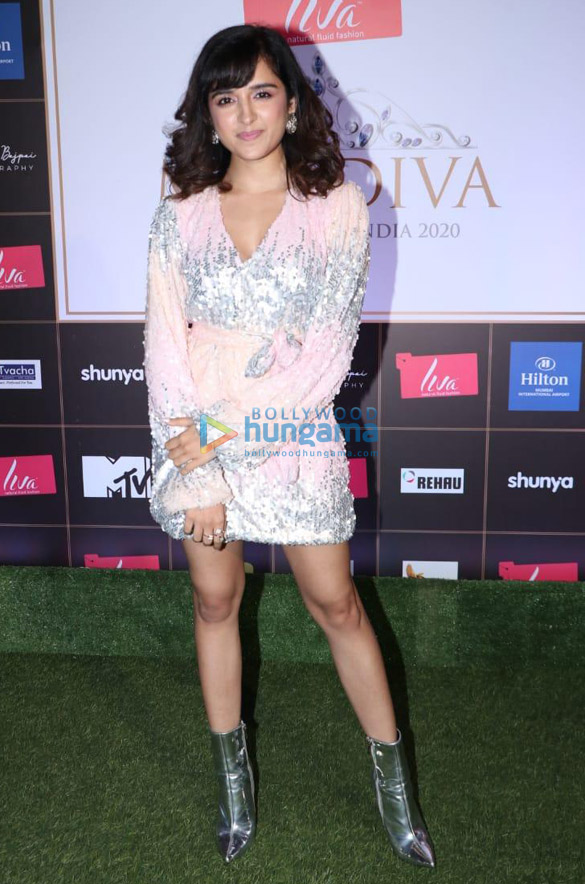
- Setia in 2020
- Born: Daman, India
- Citizenship: New Zealand
- Occupations: Singer; YouTuber; actress
- Musical career
- Origin: Auckland, New Zealand
- Genre: Pop
- Instruments: Vocals; ukulele
- Years active: 2012–present

YouTube information
- Channel: Shirley Setia
- Years active: 2012–present
- Subscribers: 3.79 million
- Views: 411.8 million
- Last updated: 15 April 2026

Shirley Setia is a New Zealand singer and actress known for her work in the Indian film and music industries.

Born in Daman, India, in the former union territory of Daman and Diu, she immigrated with her family to Auckland and gained attention as a YouTube musician by uploading covers of Hindi film songs while studying at the University of Auckland. Setia was subsequently featured in Forbes magazine, which referred to her as "Bollywood's Next Big Singing Sensation".

Setia made her acting debut with the 2020 Hindi film Maska, which was released on Netflix. She made her big-screen debut with Nikamma in 2022 and also starred in the Telugu film Krishna Vrinda Vihari, which was released on 23 September 2022.

== Early life ==
Setia was born in Daman, India and raised in Auckland, New Zealand. A graduate student from the University of Auckland and marketing and publicity intern at Auckland Council, Setia took part in a contest conducted by T-Series. Her YouTube entry was recorded in her bedroom while she was wearing pyjamas, which earned her the nickname "Pyjama popstar" by the New Zealand Herald. Setia was eventually declared the winner.

== Career ==
=== Singing career ===
After working in a weekly radio show and taking part in local competitions in Auckland, Setia performed in her first concerts in Mumbai and Hyderabad in India in 2016. Forbes magazine's Rob Cain wrote a feature on her and her future goals, in which he stated that "Bollywood's Next Big Singing Sensation Just Might Be This Tiny Kiwi". She was also acknowledged as India's YouTube sensation by the Hindustan Times and as one of New Zealand's biggest international artists by TVNZ.

As of September 2023, she has 3.86 million subscribers on YouTube with 381 million views. She was invited by YouTube as a 'YouTube Creator' to perform live in YouTube FanFest held in Mumbai in 2016 and 2017.

=== Acting career ===
Setia made her acting debut with the 2020 film Maska which was released on Netflix. Her next film was Nikamma released in June 2022, a remake of the 2017 Telugu film Middle Class Abbayi. She made her Telugu film debut with Krishna Vrinda Vihari which released in September 2022.

== Discography ==
Year	Film/Album	Song	Music director	Co-singer
2014	Non-album single	"Thode Se Hum"	Shirley Setia and Abhas Joshi	Abhas Joshi
2015	4 Steps Forward	"Naye Love Ki Subah"	Parichay	Parichay and Gunsmith
2016	Non-album single	"Koi Shor"	Ravi Singhal	Ravi Singhal
2016	Passengers	"Aadat"	Sukumar Dutta	Raftaar and Jubin Nautiyal
2017	A Gentleman	"Disco Disco"	Sachin–Jigar	Benny Dayal
2017	Best of Luck Laalu	"Luv u Luv u"	Sachin–Jigar	Kirtidan Gadhvi
2017	T-Series Mixtape	"Tu Jo Mila-Raabta"	Abhijit Vaghani	Jubin Nautiyal
2017	Non-album single	"Tu Mil Gaya"	Haroon-Gavin	
2018	Non-album single	"Jab Koi Baat" (Recreated)	DJ Chetas	Atif Aslam
2018	Non-album single	"Koi Vi Nahi"	Rajat Nagpal	Gurnazar Chattha
2018	5 Weddings	"Na Chah Ke Bhi"	Vishal Mishra	
2018	Non-album single	"Naiyo Jaana"	Ravi Singhal	
2019	Aladdin	"A Whole New World"	Kurt Hugo Schneider	
2019	T-Series Electrofolk	"Bhumro"	Aditya Dev	Aditya Dev and Parry G
2019	Non-album single	"Biba"	Marshmello and Pritam	Pardeep Singh Sran and Dev Negi
2019	T-Series Mixtape Season-2	"Ik Vaari Aa/Naadan Parindey/Tum Ho Toh"	Abhijit Vaghani	Abhijit Vaghani and Jubin Nautiyal
2020	Maska	"I Wanna Hang With You"	Mikey McClealy	IP Singh
2020	Non-album single	"Dil Ko Tumse Pyaar Hua" (Recreated)	Abhijit Vaghani	
2020	Non-album single	"Naa Tum Jaano Na Hum" (Recreated)	Abhijit Vaghani	
2020	Non-album single	" Chura Liya Hain Tumne Jo Dil Ko" (Recreated)	Abhijit Vaghani	
2021	Non-album single	"Tere Naal Rehniya"	Gaurav Dev and Kartik Dev	Gurnazar Chattha
2022	Nikamma	"Tere Bin Kya (Reprise)"	Gourov Dasgupta	Mame Khan
2023	Chhatriwali	"Main Teri Hi Rahoon"	Akhil Sachdeva	Akhil Sachdeva

== Filmography ==
=== Films ===
Year	Title	Role	Language	Notes	Ref.
2020	Maska	Persis Mistry	Hindi		
2022	Nikamma	Natasha "Nikki" Singh	Hindi		
2022	Krishna Vrinda Vihari	Vrinda Mishra	Telugu	Nominated–SIIMA Award for Best Female Debut – Telugu	

=== Television ===
Year	Title	Role	Notes	Ref.
2018	Lockdown	Herself	Cameo appearance	
2025	Sena - The Guardians of the Nation	Bhavya (Kartik's friend)	Cameo appearance	
