= Kaashi in Search of Ganga =

2018 Bollywood suspense psychological thriller film by Dhiraj Kumar

- Theatrical release poster
- Directed by: Dhiraj Kumar
- Written by: Manish Kishore
- Produced by: Dhiraj Kumar; Manish Kishore; Shravan Kumar; Sanjay Surana; Sandesh Suvarna; Vinit Singh; Nishant Dayal
- Starring: Sharman Joshi; Aishwarya Devan; Priyanka Singh; Govind Namdev; Akhilendra Mishra; Manoj Joshi
- Cinematography: Attar Singh Saini
- Edited by: Parth Y. Bhatt
- Music by: Ankit Tiwari; Vipin Patwa; Raaj Aashoo; Dj Emenes
- Production company: Insite India
- Release date: 26 October 2018
- Running time: 125 minutes
- Country: India
- Language: Hindi

Kaashi in Search of Ganga is a 2018 Indian Hindi-language suspense thriller film directed by Dhiraj Kumar starring Sharman Joshi and Aishwarya Devan in lead roles. The film is a Hindi film debut for Aishwarya Devan. In supporting roles the film also stars Govind Namdev, Akhilendra Mishra, Paritosh Tripathi, Manoj Joshi and Manoj Pahwa. The film was written by Manish Kishore. and produced by Insite India. It is set in the Indian city of Benaras also known as Varanasi or Kashi.

The movie follows two siblings, Kaashi (Sharman Joshi) and his sister Ganga (Priyanka Singh). When Ganga goes missing, Kaashi starts a search to find her, but the main problem arises when people seem to have completely forgotten about Ganga's existence.

== Plot ==
Kaashi lives a happy life with his parents and sister, Ganga. One night, his sister fails to return home from college. Kaashi immediately starts looking for Ganga and enlists the help of Devina (Aishwarya Devan). He files a police report later that night and keeps his own search going. Kaashi then makes a visit to her college the next day. The college principal checks the student records but is unable to find any evidence that Ganga had gone to school there. On the way home, some men claim to have information on Ganga's whereabouts. They refuse to divulge this information and get beaten up by Kaashi.

Elsewhere, Devina finds one of Ganga's college friends. Although she is ready to help, she seems frightened. She tells Devina that Ganga was having an affair with the son of a local strongman, Abhimanyu (Mehul Surana). Ganga's friend had not seen her since she got pregnant. Enraged, Kaashi threatens Abhimanyu's father, Balwant (Govind Namdev), to return his sister. Balwant tells him that Abhimanyu is in Mussoorie prompting Devina and Kaashi to start a journey there.

In Mussoorie, Kaashi finds Abhimanyu with another woman in a hotel room. While interrogated by Kaashi, Abhimanyu claims to not know who Ganga is. This leads Kaashi to kill him and eventually leads to his arrest.

The disfigured body of a girl is found and identified to be Ganga based on the clothes she was wearing. The case moves to court as lawyers fight things out. While some witnesses deny the existence of Ganga and her parents, others testify that they do. Kaashi's parents are also not found at home. Kaashi also believes that Balwant killed Ganga as Abhimanyu was in Mussoorie at the time. Amidst the confusion, a psychiatrist talks to Kaashi and diagnoses him with schizophrenia. After an argument breaks out between him and Balwant in court, Kaashi grabs a gun and kills Balwant.

Admitted to a psychiatric facility, Kaashi starts to question his sanity. It is revealed that Devina was the one behind it all. Remorseful, Devina confides to the girl who was earlier identified as Ganga's friend. Devina reveals she wanted revenge but not at Kaashi's cost. She goes and meets Kaashi and tells him the whole story.

Devina had identified his mental condition at the moment they met. She reveals to Kaashi that his parents and sister had been dead for quite some time. She goes on to state that Balwant was her father's business partner and killed her family 15 years ago. She used Kaashi and fabricated the story of Ganga's disappearance to carry out her revenge. Ganga's "college friend" is shown to be Devina's sister. Kaashi, now full of anger and sadness, admits that he loves Devina and wants to spend his life with her. He then kills Devina and is shown lying next to her dead body.

In the final scene Kashi is an inmate of a psychiatric ward, but he believes (hallucinates) that he is living happily with Devina and his family.

== Cast ==
- Sharman Joshi as Kaashi Chaudhary
- Priyanka Singh as Ganga Chaudhary
- Aishwarya Devan as Devina Khanna
- Govind Namdev as Balwant Pandey
- Paritosh Tripathi as Rangeela
- Kranti Prakash Jha as Babina
- Manoj Joshi as Kaashi's Lawyer
- Akhilendra Mishra as Balwant's Lawyer
- Prateek Shandilya as Dom
- Manoj Pahwa as a judge
- Gauri Shankar as Inspector Ghanshyam Yadav
- Joginder Tiwari as Chunnu
- Mugdha Meharia as Shruti
- Shahnawaz Khan as Murari
- Mehul Surana as Abhimanyu Pandey
- Pusshkar Tiwari as Munna
- Pankaj Kesari
- Riyana Sukla

== Soundtrack ==
Kaashi: in Search of Ganga

Soundtrack album by Ankit Tiwari, Vipin Patwa, Raaj Aashoo and DJ Emenes
- Released: 11 October 2018
- Recorded: 2018
- Genre: Feature film soundtrack
- Length: 31:23
- Language: Hindi
- Label: Zee Music Company
External audio
- Official Audio Jukebox on YouTube

Ankit Tiwari chronology
FryDay (2018)	Kaashi in Search of Ganga (2018)	Amavas (2019)

Vipin Patwa chronology
Daas Dev (2018)	Kaashi in Search of Ganga (2018)	Hum Chaar (2019)

Raaj Aashoo chronology
Tera Intezaar (2017)	Kaashi in Search of Ganga (2018)	Hum Chaar (2019)

The album is composed by Ankit Tiwari, Vipin Patwa, Raaj Aashoo and DJ Emenes while the lyrics penned by Shabbir Ahmed and Abhendra Kumar Upadhyay.

Track listing
No.	Title	Lyrics	Music	Singer(s)	Length
1.	"Bam Bam Bole Kaashi"	Shabbir Ahmed	Vipin Patwa	Daler Mehndi, Swati Sharma, Divya Kumar	3:52
2.	"Tujhe Dhoond Raha Dil"	Shabbir Ahmed	Raaj Aashoo	Yasser Desai	5:28
3.	"Woh Rishta"	Abhendra Kumar Upadhyay	Ankit Tiwari	Ankit Tiwari, Deepali Sathe	4:10
4.	"Ranjha"	Shabbir Ahmed	DJ Emenes	Payal Dev, Neeraj Shridhar	3:59
5.	"Betahasha"	Abhendra Kumar Upadhyay	Ankit Tiwari	Sonu Nigam, Palak Muchhal	4:31
6.	"Bam Bam Bole Kaashi" (Reprise)	Shabbir Ahmed	Vipin Patwa	Aditya Dev, Vipin Patwa	2:46
7.	"Woh Rishta" (Reprise)	Abhendra Kumar Upadhyay	Ankit Tiwari	Deepali Sathe	2:03
8.	"Betahasha" (Reprise)	Abhendra Kumar Upadhyay	Ankit Tiwari	Vaseem Ahmed, Palak Muchhal	4:34
Total length:					31:23

== Release ==
The film was released in India on 26 October 2018. The motion poster for the movie was released on 18 September 2018. The trailer for the movie was released on 19 September 2018.

== Reception ==
On the basis of 54 user ratings, the movie got 3.5/5 stars on Bollywood Hungama. Renuka Vyavahare of The Times of India gave the movie 1.5/5 stars saying that the film is a "mockery of suspense'" and that the "film ends up as an unintentional comedy"; but she adds, "Sharman Joshi and Manoj Joshi are perhaps the only actors that try to infuse some meaning to this inane story." Kunal Guha of Mumbai Mirror gave the movie 1.5/5 stars, writing that the "film lacks logic in its writing", but added that Aishwarya Devan is "fairly convincing for the large part". The average readers rating in Mumbai Mirror for the movie was 3/5.

Indo-Asian News Service gave the movie 3/5 stars, saying that the movie "is a layered tale of revenge with a good dose of romance and suspense." Saumya Gourisaria of 'The Live Mirror' gave the movie 0.5/5 stars saying that the movie "is so outrageous that it will make you laugh". S. Ramesh of Rediff gave the movie 1.5 out of 5 stars and wrote "Kaashi is bland and boring". Devesh Sharma of Filmfare gave the movie 2 out of 5 stars and wrote "Psychological thrillers need to grip you from the word go but this one just doesn’t. Whatever steam that it builds up soon fizzles out".
