= Raaj Aashoo =

Indian music composer

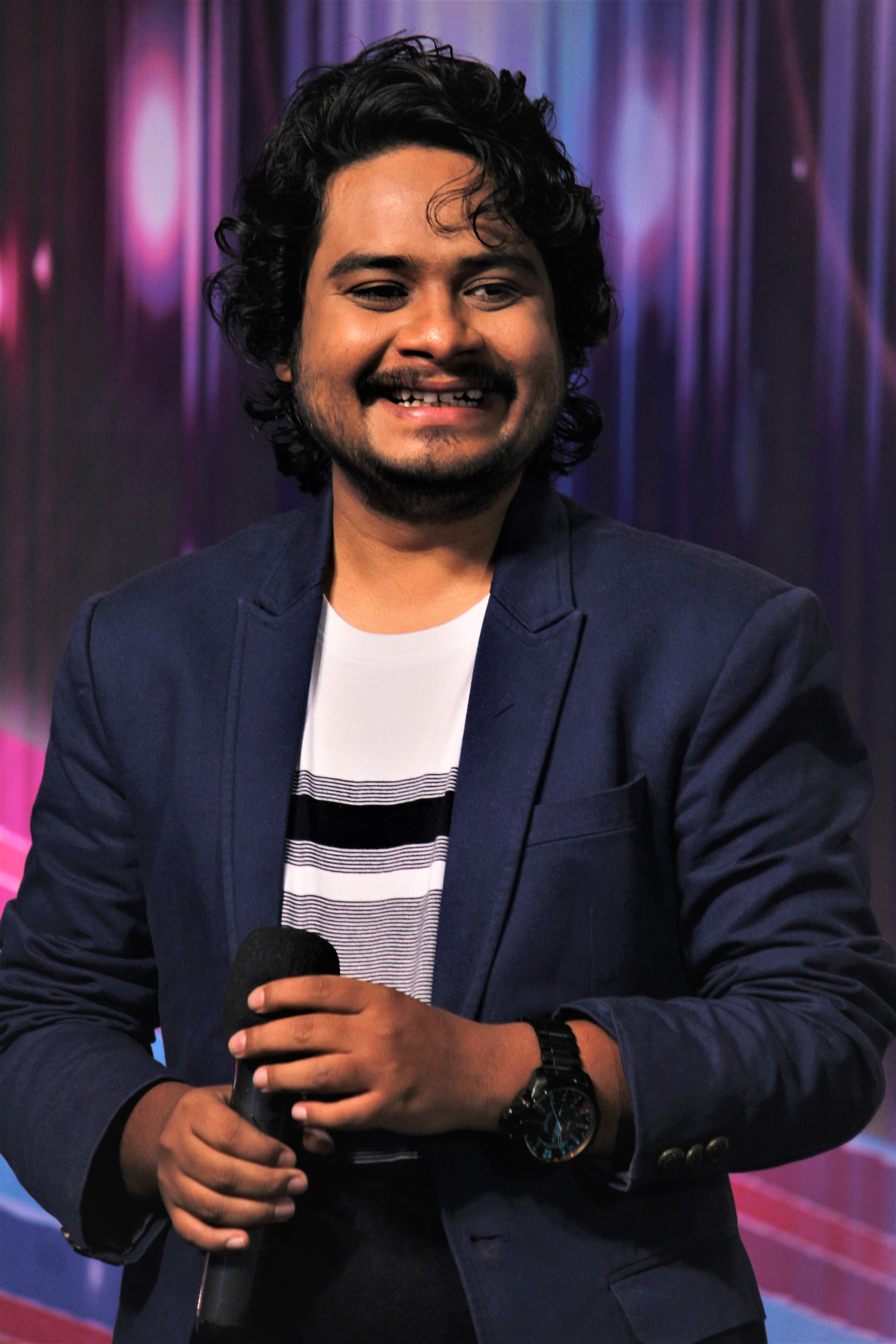

Background information
- Born: Ankit Pandey; 8 May 1986 (age 39)
- Genres: Bollywood
- Occupations: Music composer; singer-songwriter; film director
- Years active: 2011–present
- Website: http://raajaashoo.com/

Raaj Aashoo is an Indian music composer, singer and film director working mainly in Bollywood film industry. As a music director Raaj Aashoo has worked in Hindi films like Tera Intezaar, Romeo Akbar Walter, Luckhnowi Ishq, Sweetiee Weds NRI, Bypass Road, X Ray: The Inner Image, Tutak Tutak Tutiya, Hume Tumse Pyaar Kitna, Kaashi in Search of Ganga, Pareshaanpur and many more.

His debut Hindi film as director is Woh 3 Din starring Sanjay Mishra, Rajesh Sharma and Chandan Roy Sanyal in lead roles.

He is married to singer and lyricist Seepi Jha, with whom he has two daughters. Seepi recently sang and wrote lyrics for the remake of "Sabki Baaratein Aayi", whose music was directed by Raaj Aashoo.
