= Prit Kamani =

Indian actor

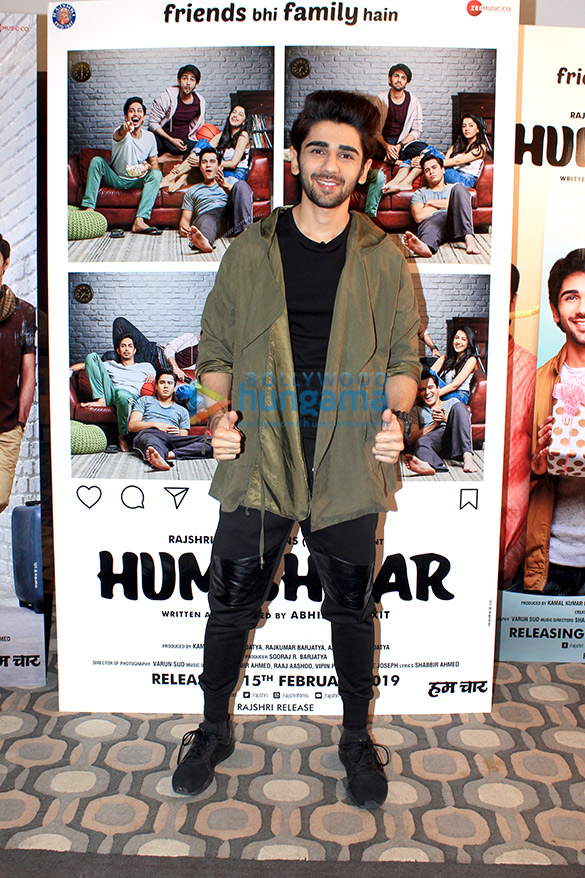
- Prit Kamani in 2019 at Hum Chaar (Movie) promotion
- Born: February 28, 1996 (age 30); Rajkot, Gujarat, India
- Education: Mithibai College
- Occupations: Actor, Content Creator
- Years active: 2017–present
- Known for: Maska (2020 film), Middle Class Love, Feels Like Home

Prit Kamani (born 28 February 1996) is an Indian actor known for his work in Hindi films and web series. He made his film debut with Hum Chaar (2019), produced by Rajshri Productions. He gained recognition for playing the lead role in the films: Maska (2020) and Middle Class Love (2022).

== Early life ==
Kamani was born on 28 February 1996 in Rajkot, Gujarat, and raised in Mumbai. He completed his graduation from Mithibai College in Mumbai with a degree in Mass Media.

== Career ==
Kamani started his career as a host on the reality show Dil Hai Hindustani in 2017.

His film debut came with Hum Chaar (2019), a youth-oriented film by Rajshri Productions.

He gained wider recognition for his lead role in the Netflix film Maska (2020), playing Rumi Irani.

In 2022, Kamani appeared in Jersey alongside Shahid Kapoor, playing the role of grown-up Kittu. He also played the lead in Middle Class Love directed by Ratnaa Sinha.

Kamani has also appeared in digital content, including the series Feels Like Home on Lionsgate Play, Jab We Matched (2023) on Amazon miniTV, and Half CA (2023), in which he played Tejas.

He also co-founded the YouTube comedy music channel JumboJutts.

== Filmography ==
=== Films ===
Year	Title	Role	Language	Ref
2019	Hum Chaar	Namit	Hindi	
2020	Maska	Rumi Irani	Hindi	
2022	Jersey	Ketan "Kittu" Talwar	Hindi	
2022	Middle Class Love	Yudhishthir Sharma	Hindi	
2025	Heer Express	Ronny	Hindi	
2026	Gabru		Hindi	

=== Web series ===
Year	Title	Role	Network	Ref.
2022	Feels Like Home	Lakshay	Lionsgate Play	
2023	Jab We Matched	Vicky	Amazon miniTV	
2023	Half CA	Tejas	Amazon miniTV	
2025	Kill Dill – The Heartbreak Club	Tavish	Amazon MX Player	
