= Riyana Sukla =

Indian actress

- Born: Odisha, India
- Occupation: Actress model

Riyana Sukla is an Indian actress who works in Odia, Hindi and Punjabi film industry. She is known for her portrayal in the Hindi movie Kaashi in Search of Ganga. She has also appeared in many Hindi, Odia and Punjabi films such as E Dil Tate Deli, Life Ki Aisi Ki Taisi, Mr MBA, Lucknowi Ishq.

== Career ==
Sukla is from Cuttack, India. She had played a major role in the Bollywood film Life Ki Aisi Ki Taisi in 2017. She had played an important role in the Bollywood film Kaashi in Search of Ganga, where she played the role of a witness to a murderer. She also had played the lead roles in Lucknowi Ishq Mr MBA and I Know You. She was the protagonist in the film E Dil Tate Deli where she played the role of a small town lady who had fallen in love with a boy who after resolving the family issues finally united. She also starred as a lead role in the web-series Fancy which was released on MX Player.

== Filmography ==
=== Films ===
| Year | Title | Role | Notes |
|---|---|---|---|
| 2014 | Mr MBA | | Hindi |
| 2015 | Lucknowi Ishq | | Hindi |
| 2017 | Life Ki Aisi Ki Taisi | | Hindi |
| 2018 | Kaashi in Search of Ganga | | Hindi |
| 2020 | I Know You | Main Lead | Hindi film |
| 2021 | E Dil Tate Deli | Main Lead | Odia film |

=== Web series ===
| Year | Title | Role | Notes |
|---|---|---|---|
| 2021 | Fancy | | Hindi |
| 2021 | The End | | Hindi |
