= Middle Class Love =

2022 Indian Hindi-language film

- Directed by: Ratnaa Sinha
- Written by: Screenplay: Yash Keswani; Sima Agarwal; Dialogues: Ratnaa Sinha; Suraj Gianani
- Story by: Ratnaa Sinha
- Produced by: Anubhav Sinha
- Starring: Eisha Singh; Kavya Thapar; Prit Kamani
- Cinematography: Manish Khushalani; Sameer Arya
- Edited by: Devendra Murdeshwar
- Music by: Songs: Himesh Reshammiya; Score: Prasad Sashte
- Production company: Benaras Media Works Zee Studios
- Distributed by: Zee Studios
- Release date: 16 September 2022
- Running time: 136 minutes
- Country: India
- Language: Hindi

Middle Class Love is an Indian Hindi-language romantic comedy film directed by Ratnaa Sinha and based on a script jointly written by Ratnaa Sinha, Yash Keswani, Sima Agarwal and Suraj Gianani from a story by Ratnaa Sinha. Produced by Anubhav Sinha under the banner of Benaras Media Works in association with Zee Studios, which also serves as distributor, it stars Eisha Singh, Kavya Thapar and Prit Kamani. The film was theatrically released in India on 16 September 2022.

== Plot ==
A young college boy is frustrated with being stuck in middle-class family mode and decides that love will be the ideal way to get out of it. However, the path to getting rid of middle-class thinking and probing parents isn't as easy as it seems initially.

== Cast ==
- Eisha Singh as Ashna Tripathi (Ash)
- Kavya Thapar as Sysha Oberoi
- Prit Kamani as Yudhishthir Sharma (Yudi)
- Manoj Pahwa as Sharmaji
- Sanjay Bishnoi
- Sapna Sand
- Omkar Kulkarni as Oshir Pannu

== Production ==
The principal photography of the film began in 2019 in Mussoorie but was halted due to bad weather; it resumed in 2021.

=== Marketing and release ===
The trailer of the film was released on 7 August 2022. Middle Class Love was released theatrically on 16 September 2022.

The cast promoted the film on The Kapil Sharma Show.

== Soundtrack ==
Middle Class Love

Soundtrack album by Himesh Reshammiya
- Released: 2022
- Recorded: 2022
- Venue: Mumbai
- Genre: Feature film soundtrack
- Length: 33:19
- Language: Hindi
- Label: Zee Music Company
- Producer: Himesh Reshammiya

Himesh Reshammiya chronology
Radhe (2021)	Middle Class Love (2022)	Raksha Bandhan (2022)

Official audio
- Middle-Class Love - Full Album on YouTube

The film's music is composed by Himesh Reshammiya while lyrics were penned by Himesh Reshammiya, Shabbir Ahmed, Shakeel Azmi and Mayur Puri. The song "Apna Karenge" was composed by Prasanna Suresh and lyrics were written by Spitfire.

Track listing
No.	Title	Lyrics	Singer(s)	Length
1.	"Naya Pyaar Naya Ehsaas"	Himesh Reshammiya	Palak Muchhal, Jubin Nautiyal	5:44
2.	"Tuk Tuk"	Shabbir Ahmed	Himesh Reshammiya, Payal Dev	3:55
3.	"Manjha"	Shakeel Azmi	Himesh Reshammiya, Raj Barman (Aalaps: Salman Ali)	5:17
4.	"Apna Karenge (Music: Prasanna Suresh)"	Spitfire	Spitfire	1:12
5.	"Hypnotize"	Mayur Puri	Dev Negi, Akasa Singh, Aasa Singh	3:43
6.	"Kisko Tha Pata"	Mayur Puri	Vishal Dadlani	3:15
7.	"Manjha - Reprise"	Shakeel Azmi	Aishwarya Pandit	4:29
8.	"Naya Pyaar Naya Ehsaas - Raj Barman Version"	Himesh Reshammiya	Raj Barman	5:44
Total length:				33:19

== Reception ==
Archika Khurana of Times of India gave 2.5/5 and stated "It's alight and breezy coming-of-age drama". Shubhra Gupta from Indian Express gave it a 2/5 and stated that "Like in most Bollywood movies set in these kinds of ‘schools’, no studying is done, instead the setting is just an excuse for good-looking teenagers to learn life lessons." Sonil Dedhia of News18 rated it 3/5 and stated it "a light-hearted coming-of-age story that every middle class person especially the college going kids would relate to." Subhash K. Jha of Firstpost praised the film stating that "A surprisingly well-packaged, coming-of-age rom-com with a star turn by Prit Kamani."
