= Maska (2020 film) =

2020 Hindi Film

- Release poster
- Directed by: Neeraj Udhwani
- Written by: Ishita Moitra; Neeraj Udhwani
- Produced by: Seher Latif; Shivani Saran
- Starring: Manisha Koirala; Javed Jaffrey; Nikita Dutta; Shirley Setia; Prit Kamani
- Cinematography: Eeshit Narain
- Edited by: Farooq Hundekar
- Music by: Akshay Raheja; Mikey McCleary; Ketan Sodha
- Production company: Mutant Films
- Distributed by: Netflix
- Release date: 27 March 2020
- Running time: 112 minutes
- Country: India
- Language: Hindi

Maska is a 2020 Indian Hindi-language drama film written and directed by Neeraj Udhwani. It stars Manisha Koirala, Javed Jaffrey, Nikita Dutta, Prit Kamani and debutant Shirley Setia. The film follows a guy who sets out to fulfil his dream of becoming an actor until he meets a girl who helps him discover the reality. Maska was released on Netflix on 27 March 2020.

== Plot ==
Rumi Irani is the successor of Rustom Irani, his father, who used to run the Rustom Cafe, in South Mumbai. His mother, Diana Irani, runs the cafe with basic menus. After the death of his father, Diana is hopeful of Rumi taking over the business and revamping it, when he completes his undergraduate studies. One day, he wins the Mr. Feroz Shah Bag award, alongside Persis Mistry, who wins the Ms. Feroz Shah Bag Award. There, he develops a passion for becoming an actor. He enrolls himself in an acting school and gets attracted to Mallika, a Punjabi divorcee. Both engage in a physical relation and start a relationship.

On their graduation day, Rumi does not get the Best Actor award that he had anticipated of winning. Whereas, Mallika receives the Best Actress award. She convinces Rumi into a live-in relationship, and Rumi takes her to introduce his mother, who immediately disapproves her, for being a divorcee. She also tells him that he would not have her blessing, if he wishes to proceed with the relationship. In desperation, Rumi sells his father's watch and flees with the money.

He starts living in Andheri, with Mallika, and starts giving auditions. His acting, not being up to the mark, is rejected everywhere. Meanwhile, Mallika gets the lead role in a web series. Fed up, Rumi is about to get over his dream, when he learns about a director, who does not have funds for a film he wants to make. Anybody who brings him enough funds, will be the main lead for the film. Desperate of landing the lead role, Rumi decides to sell his father's cafe. Meanwhile, Persis is making a coffee table book on the Irani cafés of Mumbai. She spends time with Rumi, as she does her research and writing, in his cafe. She eventually falls in love with him and asks him to take her virginity. Hesitating, he decides to accept her proposal. Later, they make love at his cafe.

When the day of the sale of the cafe arrives, Diana gets to know about why he came back from Andheri. She signs the papers, transferring the power of the attorney to him, allowing him to sell the cafe, legally. At the time of the deal, he changes his mind and decides to give up his dream of acting, as it was only a delusion. He breaks up with Mallika and reconciles with Persis. Later, along with Diana, the both of them are seen celebrating the centenary of the cafe with Boman Irani, as their chief guest.

== Cast ==
- Manisha Koirala as Diana Irani
- Nikita Dutta as Mallika Chopra
- Javed Jaffrey as Rustom Irani
- Prit Kamani as Rumi Irani
- Shirley Setia as Persis Mistry
- Boman Irani as himself
- Cyrus Sahukar as Cyrus
- Abhishek Banerjee as Casting director Abhishek

== Soundtrack ==
Maska

Soundtrack album by Akshay Raheja, Mikey McCleary and Ketan Sodha
- Released: 16 March 2020
- Genre: Feature film soundtrack
- Length: 12:51
- Language: Hindi
- Label: Netflix

The soundtrack album is composed by Akshay Raheja, Mikey McCleary and Ketan Sodha with lyrics written by IP Singh, Mikey McCleary, Shirley Setia, Jonita Gandhi and Neeraj Udhwani.

Track listing
| No. | Title | Lyrics | Music | Singer(s) | Length |
|---|---|---|---|---|---|
| 1. | "Majja Ma Re Tu" | IP Singh | Akshay Raheja | IP Singh | 01:32 |
| 2. | "Down on the Street" | Mikey McCleary, Enkore | Mikey McCleary | Mikey McCleary, Enkore | 03:07 |
| 3. | "I Wanna Hang With You" | IP Singh, Shirley Setia | Akshay Raheja | IP Singh, Shirley Setia | 02:15 |
| 4. | "Chuney Chuney" | Jonita Gandhi | Ketan Sodha | Jonita Gandhi | 03:11 |
| 5. | "Back To You" | Neeraj Udhwani | Mikey McCleary | Mikey McCleary, Neeraj Udhwani | 02:44 |
| Total length: | | | | | 12:51 |

== Critical reception ==
On the review aggregator website Rotten Tomatoes, 14% of 7 critics' reviews are positive, with an average rating of 3.7/10.

The Indian Express's Shubhra Gupta in her two star review wrote, "The best parts of Maska are filled with food, the cooking and eating of it: the textures of baking fresh bread, the buttery ooze of the maska, the other classic dishes you may find in an Irani establishment, and the golden lights that fill up the kitchen." Rohan Naahar writing for Hindustan Times stated, "The film has such as an endearing charm that it becomes virtually impossible to hold a grudge against it, even when you realise that Maska (like the hundreds of chefs who’ve tried to mimic Manish Mehrotra’s Daulat Ki Chaat) is essentially scene-for-scene rip-off of the 2009 film Today’s Special, starring Aasif Mandvi and Naseeruddin Shah."

Vibha Maru of India Today wrote, "Maska is an age-old-story told in the most colourful way. Manisha and Jaaved's shoulders bear the burden of the entire film. Watch the film for them, they will make you miss your parents a little less and get through this time in quarantine." The Hindu's Namrata Joshi wrote, "In these home-bound times, the film does leave you feeling nostalgic for old Mumbai houses you used to encounter on walks. Most of all, it ignites a craving for those soft buns slathered with mounds of butter and the extra sweet tea at Irani cafés. And also those small cups of Bournvita, tea and coffee sold on cycle-carts late into the night and the wee hours of the morning in a city that never sleeps. Rather never used to sleep. Hope it soon wakes up again." The New Indian Express's Sudhir Srinivasan stated, "Given its deceptively interesting beginnings, you’d never guess how low Maska would go on to fall. The conflict is straightforward and one milked for decades in our cinema."
