= Half CA =

Indian drama television series

- Promotional poster
- Genre: Drama; Romance; Inspirational fiction
- Developed by: Arunabh Kumar; Harish Peddinti
- Story by: Arunabh Kumar; Harish Peddinti; Khushbu Baid; Tatsat Pandey
- Directed by: Pratish Mehta
- Starring: Ahsaas Channa; Gyanendra Tripathi; Anmol Kajani; Prit Kamani; Rohan Joshi; Aishwarya Ojha
- Theme music composer: Neog; Ravi Ra
- Country of origin: India
- Original language: Hindi
- No. of seasons: 2
- No. of episodes: 10

Production
- Producer: Arunabh Kumar
- Cinematography: Ashwin Kadamboor
- Editor: Akash Bundhoo
- Camera setup: Multi-camera
- Running time: 34–44 minutes
- Production company: The Viral Fever (TVF)

Original release
- Network: Amazon Mini TV; MX Player
- Release: 25 July 2023 – 27 August 2025

Half CA is an Indian Hindi-language Inspirational fiction and drama television series produced by The Viral Fever (TVF). The series features Ahsaas Channa, Gyanendra Tripathi, Anmol Kajani, Prit Kamani, Rohan Joshi and Aishwarya Ojha. Its first season premiered on Amazon Mini TV on 25 July 2023. A second season premiered on both Amazon Mini TV and MX Player on 27 August 2025.

== Synopsis ==
The series revolves around the challenges and experiences faced by Chartered Accountancy students in India. It mainly focuses on the lives of Neeraj and Archie and the challenges faced by them as CA students. The new phase of life that Archie and her best friend Vishal face in their B.com and CA journeys and Neeraj who has a pressure of family and constantly failing but the inspiration to never give up with his friend Archie.

== Cast ==
- Ahsaas Channa as Archie Mehta
- Gyanendra Tripathi as CA Niraj Goyal
- Anmol Kajani as Vishal Jain
- Prit Kamani as Tejas Kaushik, Archie's boyfriend
- Rohan Joshi as Parth Nyati
- Aishwarya Ojha as Kavya, CS aspirant and Niraj's ex-girlfriend
- Brij Bhushan Shukla as Shreedhar Sir
- Manu Bisht as Disha
- Hardik Sangani as Bhumik
- Neeraj Sood as Mr. Goyal, Niraj's father
- Madhu Sachdeva as Niraj's mother
- Sanika Amit as Archie's friend
- Sam Mohan as CA Saurabh Shah
- Paramveer Cheema as CA Ritesh Lalwani

== Episodes ==
Season	Episodes	Originally released
1	5	July 25, 2023
2	5	August 27, 2025

=== Season 1 (2023) ===
No. overall	No. in season	Title	Original release date
1	1	"CA Kyun Karna Hai?"	July 25, 2023
2	2	"Overhead Expenses"	July 25, 2023
3	3	"Write Off"	July 25, 2023
4	4	"Group 1 Group 2"	July 25, 2023
5	5	"Balance Sheet"	July 25, 2023

=== Season 2 (2025) ===
No. overall	No. in season	Title	Original release date
6	1	"New Account"	August 27, 2025
7	2	"Orientation"	August 27, 2025
8	3	"Reconciliation"	August 27, 2025
9	4	"Articleship Vs. Exams"	August 27, 2025
10	5	"Balancing Figures"	August 27, 2025

== Production ==
The series was announced by The Viral Fever (TVF) for Amazon Mini TV. Ahsaas Channa, Gyanendra Tripathi, Anmol Kajani, Prit Kamani and Rohan Joshi were signed as the lead. Ahsaas Channa collaborated with ClearTax to promote awareness about Income Tax Return (ITR) filing.

Its second season was announced on 1 July 2024 and premiered on 27 August 2025.

== Reception ==
Sunidhi Prajapat of OTT Play rated the series 3/5 stars. Archika Khurana of The Times of India rated the series 3.5/5 stars.
