= Vipin Patwa =

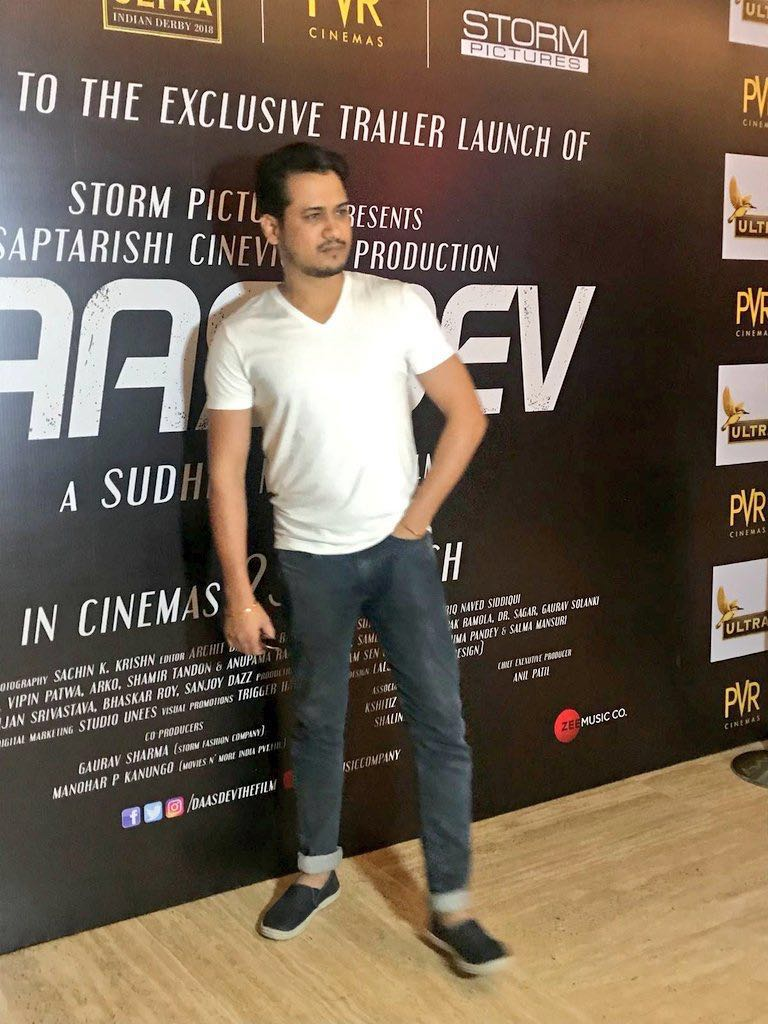
- Patwa at trailer launch of Daas Dev

Background information
- Born: 1 October 1982 (age 43); Gorakhpur, Uttar Pradesh, India
- Origin: India
- Genres: Indian classical, soft rock, Indian film
- Occupations: Composer, music director, singer, vocalist
- Years active: 2011– Present
- Website: vipinpatwa.in

Vipin Patwa is a music director, singer, and composer known for his work in Hindi movies, particularly for Bollywood.

== Early life ==
Vipin Patwa was born on October 1, 1982, in Gorakhpur, Uttar Pradesh, India, and was brought up in New Delhi. He received his musical training under Pandit Harish Tiwari of the Kirana Gharana. Vipin completed his graduate and postgraduate studies in Indian classical music and also earned a Master of Philosophy degree in music from Delhi University. Additionally, he completed a six-year course titled 'Sangeet Prabhakar'. [citation needed]

== Career ==
While completing his bachelor's degree in 2002, Vipin Patwa joined All India Radio as a music composer, creating jingles and songs for the station. In January 2009, he relocated to Mumbai to pursue opportunities in the Bollywood music industry. He received his first significant break with Joe Rajan's film 'Luv U Soniyo'. Over the years, Vipin has collaborated with numerous renowned Bollywood singers, including Sonu Nigam, Neha Kakkar, Arijit Singh, Atif Aslam, Mika Singh, KK, Shaan, Shreya Ghoshal, and Sunidhi Chauhan. [citation needed]

Sonu Nigam, a Bollywood performer, has praised Vipin as a composer, as well as a singer. Nigam also called him "Vilakshan". Many renowned celebrities have also praised Vipin's compositions.

== Discography ==
- Ye Stupid Pyar (2011)
- Main Aur Charles (2015)
- Laal Rang (2016)
- Bollywood Diaries (2016)
- Wah Taj (2016)
- Laali Ki Shaadi Mein Laddoo Deewana (2017)
- Rambhajjan Zindabad (2017)
- Daas Dev (2018)
- Kaashi in Search of Ganga (2018)
- Hum Chaar (2019)
- De De Pyaar De (2019)
- The Girl On The Train (2021)
- Bhuj: The Pride of India (2021)
- Nikamma (2022)
- Code Name: Tiranga (2022)
- De De Pyaar De 2 (TBA)
- Firkee (TBA)

== Filmography as composer ==
| Year | Film | Song |
|---|---|---|
| 2022 | Code Name: Tiranga | "Vande Mataram" "Yaar Ve" |
| 2022 | Nikamma | “Nasha Ishq Ka” |
| 2021 | Bhuj: The Pride of India | "Ishq Mera" |
| 2021 | The Girl on the Train | "Matlabi Yariyan" "Matlabi Yariyan - Unplugged" |
| 2019 | De De Pyaar De | "Vaddi Sharaban" |
| 2019 | Hum Chaar | "Auliya" |
| 2018 | Kaashi in Search of Ganga | "Bam Bam Bole Kaashi" |
| 2018 | Daas Dev | "Sehmi Hai Dhadkan" |
| 2017 | Laali Ki Shaadi Mein Laaddoo Deewana | "Bezuban" "Naino Ka Pokhar" "Rog Jaane - Rahat Version" "Rog Jaane - Mohit Version" |
| 2016 | Bollywood Diaries | Solo composer |
| 2016 | Laal Rang | "Bhaang Ragad Ke" "Karch Karod" "Karch Karod - Slow" |
| 2015 | Main Aur Charles | One of the composers |
