= Aishwarya Devan =

Indian actress

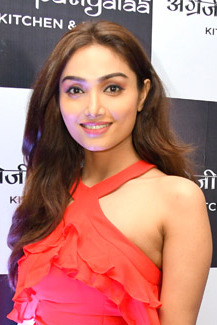
- Devan in 2018
- Born: Shornur, Palakkad, Kerala
- Occupation: Actress
- Years active: 2011–2018
- Title: Femina Miss India Maharashtra 2017 (winner) Femina Miss India 2017 (Top 6)

Aishwarya Devan is an Indian actress and model from Kerala, who has acted in Malayalam, Tamil and Kannada cinema. She was crowned Femina Miss India Maharashtra in 2017. She won various subtitles during the contest and made it to top-6 finalists. She made her Hindi film debut with the film Kaashi in Search of Ganga.

== Early life ==
Aishwarya was born to Malayalee parents in Bangalore to S. Devan, and Sheeja Devan who is from Shornur, Palakkad district, Kerala.

== Career ==
She debuted in a Tamil movie 'Yuvan' with Siddharth Rajkumar and Rakul Preet Singh. Then in Malayalam, Deepan introduced her to Shaji Kailas who cast her in his film Simhasanam opposite Prudhviraj Sukumaran. She played a Bangalore-based girl who, after her Plus Two, enters college in both her films. Yuvan was her first Tamil film and Simhasanam was her first Malayalam film.

After Simhasanam, she acted in Bala's The Hitlist and Major Ravi’s Karmayodha.

In 2013, she received the lead role In V. K. Prakash's Thank You. In the early 2014 she signed up for the Tamil film Anegan directed by K.V. Anand as the second lead opposite Dhanush which released in the early 2015 and was a blockbuster, which also released as Anekudu in Telugu.

== Filmography ==
Year	Film	Role	Language	Notes
2011	Keratam	Geetha	Telugu	credited as Aishwarya
2011	Yuvan	Meena	Tamil	credited as Aishwarya
2012	Simhasanam	Nanda	Malayalam	
2012	The Hitlist	Avanthika	Malayalam	
2012	Karmayodha	Kidnapped girl	Malayalam	
2012	Chennaiyil Oru Naal	Jennifer Mary Tony	Tamil	
2013	Thank You	Shruthi	Malayalam	
2013	Jai Lalitha	Lalitha	Kannada	
2014	Sreenivasan Paranja Kadha		Malayalam	
2015	Anegan	Meera & Mallika	Tamil	
2018	Kashi in search of ganga	Devina	Hindi	
