= X Ray: The Inner Image =

- Directed by: Rajiv Ruia
- Screenplay by: Ravindra R Patil; Rajiv Ruia
- Produced by: Pradeep K Sharma
- Starring: Rahul Sharma; Yaashi Kapoor
- Cinematography: Javed Ahtasham
- Edited by: Komal Verma
- Music by: Songs Raaj Aashoo; Background Score Amar Mohile
- Production company: Baba Motion Picture PVT. LTD
- Release date: 29 November 2019
- Country: India
- Language: Hindi

X Ray: The Inner Image is a 2019 Indian psychological thriller film. It stars Rahul Sharma and Yaashi Kapoor in the lead and is directed by Rajiv S Ruia.

== Synopsis ==
X Ray: The Inner Image is the story of a young boy, Vishal, who faces emotional dilemmas and their repercussions. One day when he is home alone as his family has gone to a wedding, Vishal encounters a girl named Yashi, whose car has broken down near his bungalow late at night. He invites her to stay the night at his house as no mechanic would be available till the morning. As rain accompanied by gusty winds drenches them, Yashi accept Vishal's offer. Vishal is attracted by Yashi's beauty and lust for her, a feeling previously unknown to him. Yashi fiercely resists his advances. Would she manage to escape or would Vishal succeed in fulfilling his lust forms the rest of the story.

== Cast ==
- Raahul Sharma as Vishal
- Yaashi Kapoor as Yashi
- Evelyn Sharma as an item number in the song "Jiglia"

== Soundtrack ==
X Ray: The Inner Image

Soundtrack album by Composer Raaj Aashoo Lyrics Shabbir Ahmed & Alka Khan
- Released: 15 November 2019
- Genre: Feature film soundtrack
- Length: 14:40
- Language: Hindi
- Label: T-Series

The music for the film was composed by Raaj Aashoo and the lyrics written by Shabbir Ahmed & Alka Khan.

Track listing
No.	Title	Lyrics	Singer(s)	Length
1.	"Jiglia"	Shabbir Ahmed	Swati Sharma, Ikka
2.	"Higher"	Alka Khan	Swati Sharma
3.	"Higher(English Version)"	Alka Khan	Swati Sharma
4.	"Aa Paas Aa"	Alka Khan	Dev Negi
5.	"Lemme Love You"	Alka Khan	Samiir
Total length:				14:40
