= Anupama Raag =

Bollywood music director and singer

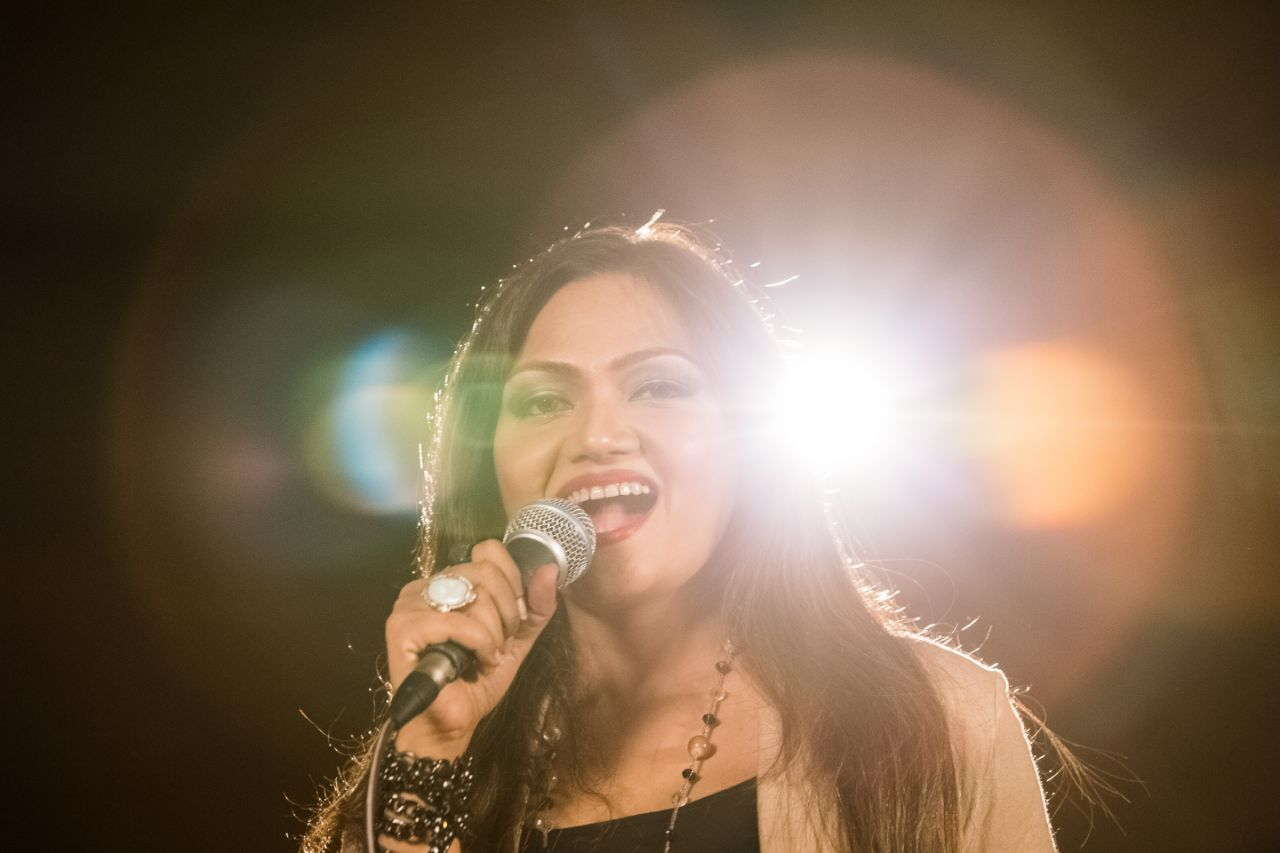
Anupama Raag

Anupama Raag is a Bollywood music director and singer, born in Lucknow and educated at Bhatkhande Sanskriti Vishwavidyalaya.

== Biography ==
=== Education ===
Annupama Raag was trained in classical music at Ustad Gulshan Bharti of Lucknow gharana, and Yogendra Bhat of Gwalior gharana, under the traditional guru-shishya parampara.

=== Early career ===
She made her Bollywood debut in 2011 with the number "Shalu ke thumke", in the movie Bin Bulaye Barati. The song was composed by Anand Raj. In the same year she sang "Nazar Se Nazar Mile" together with Rahat Fateh Ali Khan, in Mile Na Mile Ham. She has sung with Mika Singh in the movie Zila Ghaziabad and with Madhuri Dixit in Gulab Gang.

=== Later career ===
Raag has produced music for films and albums. She works for Salman Khan productions and Yash Raj Films, and has also composed music for Lucknow Development Authority and the Uttar Pradesh Pride Song for Uttar Pradesh Government. She has also composed jingles for TV Commercials for various brands.

Her album with Mika Singh was called Laal Dupatta. On 21 January 2017, the song "Saware" with Rahat Fateh Ali Khan was released.

== Awards and titles ==
She received the "Yash Bharati" Award by Uttar Pradesh government for 2016–2017.

== Filmography ==
=== Singer ===
Song	Film title	Music director	Year
Rangi Saari Gulabi	Gulaab Gang	Soumik Sen	2014
Shalu Ke Thumke	Bin Bulaye Baraati	Anand Raj Anand	2011
Nazar Se Nazar	Miley Naa Miley Hum	Sajid-Wajid	2011
Ghaziabad Ki Rani (Baap Ka Maal)	Zila Ghaziabad	Amjad Nadeem	2013

=== Music Director ===
Album	Singer	Year
Daas Dev	Swanand Kirkire	2018
I Love My U.P	Anupama Raag, Shashi Suman	2018
Naina Re	Anupama Raag	2017
Saware	Anupama Raag, Rahet Fateh Ali Khan	2017
Banjarey	Anupama Raag, Rahet Fateh Ali Khan	2017
Laal Dupatta	Anupama Raag, Mika Singh	2016
