= Heer Express =

Indian Hindi-language drama film

- Theatrical release poster
- Directed by: Umesh Shukla
- Screenplay by: Divyanshu Rawat; Pavan Balagam
- Story by: Sanjay Grover
- Produced by: Umesh Shukla; Ashish Wagh; Mohit Chhabra; Sanjay Grover
- Starring: Divita Juneja; Ashutosh Rana; Sanjay Mishra; Gulshan Grover; Prit Kamani; Meghna Malik
- Cinematography: Sameer Arya
- Edited by: Mayur Hardas
- Music by: Tanishk Bagchi; Avvy Sra; Jerry Singh; Sakaar Singh
- Production companies: Tulip Entertainment; Divisa Entertainment; Merry Go Round Studios; Creative Strokes Group
- Distributed by: Pen Marudhar
- Release date: 12 September 2025
- Running time: 140 minutes
- Country: India
- Language: Hindi
- Box office: ₹9.42 crore

Heer Express is a 2025 Indian Hindi-language drama film directed by Umesh Shukla. The film is produced by Tulip Entertainment, Divisa Entertainment, Merry Go Round Studios, and Creative Strokes Group. It stars Divita Juneja in her first film role, alongside Ashutosh Rana, Sanjay Mishra, Gulshan Grover, and Prit Kamani. The film was released theatrically on 12 September 2025.

== Synopsis ==
The story centres on Heer Wallia, a young woman from Punjab who moves to the United Kingdom following the death of her mother. In the UK, she attempts to pursue her interest in cooking and manage the expectations tied to her family's background. The narrative depicts her efforts to adapt to a new setting and navigate personal and cultural challenges.

== Cast ==
- Divita Juneja as Heer Wallia
- Ashutosh Rana as TJ
- Sanjay Mishra as Mama
- Gulshan Grover as Mama
- Prit Kamani as Rohan Ahuja
- Meghna Malik
- Javed Khan Amrohi
- Sarah Lockett as Olivia
- Ben Walton-Jones as Mickey

== Production ==
The film was announced in 2025 and is directed by Umesh Shukla, who also serves as one of the producers. Other members of the production team include Ashish Wagh, Mohit Chhabra, Sanjay Grover, and co-producer Sampada Wagh. Filming took place in the United Kingdom and parts of India.

== Release ==
Heer Express was released theatrically on 12 September 2025.

The film began streaming on JioHotstar from 6 January 2026

== Reception ==
Abhishek Srivastava of The Times of India rated it 2.5/5 stars and said that "‘Heer Express,’ in the end, offers “clean entertainment” only if your idea of fun is being stuck on a cinematic train that refuses to pick up speed." Rishabh Suri of Hindustan Times gave it 2 stars out of 5 and said that "The first half drags, the second half never grips, and the film can't figure out what to do with its seasoned cast." Sharva Srivastava of Times Now rated it 3/5 stars and stated that "Heer Express is a warm, feel-good film that celebrates resilience, love, and family bonds. Despite its flaws, predictability being the most prominent, the film has a lot of heart."

Rachit Gupta of Filmfare gave 3 stars out of 5 and said that "Heer Express is a rehash of the same-old Punjabi family drama mixed with a coming-of-age girl story." Ria Sharma of Free Press Journal gave 3 stars out of 5 and said that "Heer Express is a warm, feel-good entertainer that celebrates resilience, love, and family. It has its share of flaws—predictability being the biggest—but it also has heart." Subhash K Jha of News 24 rated it 3/5 stars and commented that "Heer Express chugs along with a sweet, won’t-hurt-a-fly charm, but its manufactured crises fail to excite. Divita Juneja dazzles as Heer, yet Prit Kamani often steals the spotlight."

Deepa Gahlot of Rediff.com gave 2.5 stars out of 5 and observed that "The comedy is unfunny, the emotional bits are dubious and the music forgettable in Heer Express."

== See also ==
- Cinema of India
- List of Hindi films of 2025
