= Daas Dev =

2018 film directed by Sudhir Mishra

- Theatrical release poster
- Directed by: Sudhir Mishra
- Screenplay by: Sudhir Mishra; Jaydeep Sarkar; Shubhra Chatterji
- Based on: Devdas
- Produced by: Sanjjeev Kumar; Gaurav Sharma; Manohar P Kanungo
- Starring: Rahul Bhat; Richa Chadda; Aditi Rao Hydari
- Cinematography: Sachin K. Krishn
- Edited by: Archit Damodar Rastogi
- Music by: Vipin Patwa; Arko Pravo Mukherjee; Sandesh Shandilya; Anupama Raag; Shamir Tandon
- Production companies: Storm Motion Pictures; Saptarishi Cinevision Production
- Distributed by: Shringar Films
- Release date: 27 April 2018
- Running time: 140 minutes
- Country: India
- Language: Hindi

Daas Dev (transl. Servant God) is an Indian Hindi-language romantic political thriller directed by Sudhir Mishra and story concept by Zuhaebb. The film stars Rahul Bhat as Dev Pratap Chauhan, Richa Chadda as Paro, Aditi Rao Hydari as Chandni, and Saurabh Shukla, Vineet Kumar Singh and Dalip Tahil in supporting roles along with Anil George, Deepraj Rana with Anurag Kashyap in a guest appearance. The film was released on 27 April 2018.

== Plot ==
The film starts with a politician giving a speech who dies soon after in a helicopter crash. His son Dev grows up and is living a lavish lifestyle and is a drug addict. He owes crores and crores of money to financiers. They kidnap him and when his girlfriend calls one of their well wishers he is rescued. When his uncle suffers a stroke, Dev returns to claim his father's legacy.

== Cast ==
- Rahul Bhat as Dev Pratap Chauhan
- Richa Chadda as Paro
- Aditi Rao Hydari as Chandni Mehra
- Saurabh Shukla as Awadesh Pratap Chauhan
- Vipin Sharma as Ramashray Shukla
- Yogesh Kumar Mishra as Harsh, Paro's Boyfriend
- Anurag Kashyap as Vishambhar Pratap Chauhan
- Dalip Tahil as Shrikant Sahay
- Sohaila Kapur as Sushila Devi
- Vineet Kumar Singh as Milan Shukla
- Deepraj Rana as Prabhunath Singh
- Anil George as Naval Singh
- Jay Shanker Pandey as Inspector
- Mahesh Chandra Deva as villager

== Soundtrack ==
Daas Dev

Soundtrack album by Vipin Patwa, Arko Pravo Mukherjee, Sandesh Shandilya, Anupama Raag and Shamir Tandon
- Released: 21 February 2018
- Recorded: 2016–17
- Genre: Feature film soundtrack
- Length: 26:26
- Language: Hindi
- Label: Zee Music Company
External audio
- Official Audio Jukebox on YouTube

The film's music was composed by Vipin Patwa, Arko Pravo Mukherjee, Sandesh Shandilya, Anupama Raag and Shamir Tandon while lyrics written by Dr. Sagar, Arko, Munir Niazi, Deepak Ramola, Faiz Ahmed Faiz, Gaurav Solanki, Bulleh Shah and Sameer Anjaan.

Track listing
No.	Title	Lyrics	Music	Singer(s)	Length
1.	"Sehmi Hai Dhadkan"	Dr. Sagar	Vipin Patwa	Atif Aslam	4:01
2.	"Rangdaari"	Arko, Munir Niazi	Arko	Arko, Navraj Hans	4:06
3.	"Challa Chaap Chunariya"	Deepak Ramola	Sandesh Shandilya	Rekha Bhardwaj	3:59
4.	"Raat Din Yunhi"	Faiz Ahmed Faiz	Sandesh Shandilya	Papon, Shraddha Mishra	4:17
5.	"Azaad Kar"	Gaurav Solanki	Anupama Raag	Swanand Kirkire	3:28
6.	"Tain to Uttey"	Bulleh Shah	Vipin Patwa	Javed Bashir	2:45
7.	"Marne Ka Shauk"	Sameer Anjaan	Shamir Tandon	Papon, Krishna Beura	3:50
Total length:					26:26
