= Feels Like Home (TV series) =

Indian comedy drama web series

- Genre: Comedy
- Created by: Sidhanta Mathur
- Written by: Chiranjeevi Bajpai & Parikshit Joshi
- Screenplay by: Gauri Pandit
- Story by: Parikshit Joshi
- Directed by: Sahir Raza
- Starring: Anshuman Malhotra; Mihir Ahuja; Preet Kammani; Vishnu Kaushal
- Theme music composer: Abhigyan Arora
- Composer: Soutrik Chakraborty
- Country of origin: India
- Original language: Hindi
- No. of seasons: 2
- No. of episodes: 12 (list of episodes)

Production
- Executive producer: Sameer Bangara
- Producer: Sidhanta Mathur
- Production locations: Mumbai, India
- Cinematography: Vivian Singh Sahi
- Editor: Satya Sharma
- Camera setup: Multi-camera
- Running time: 35-40 mins
- Production company: Writeous Studios

Original release
- Network: Lionsgate India
- Release: 10 June – 7 October 2022

Feels Like Home is a 2022 Indian Hindi-language Comedy drama streaming web series directed by Sahir Raza. The series is created and produced by Sidhanta Mathur under the banner of Writeous Studios. The series stars Anshuman Malhotra, Mihir Ahuja, Prit Kamani and Vishnu Kaushal in the lead alongside Himika Bose and Inayat Sood. The series premiered on Lionsgate Play on 10 June 2022. A second season premiered on the service on 7 October 2022.

== Cast ==
- Anshuman Malhotra
- Mihir Ahuja
- Prit Kamani
- Vishnu Kaushal
- Inayat Sood
- Dolly Singh
- Garvit Pruthi
- Himika Bose
- Leah Khambata
- Surbhi Dhyani
- Arun Singh
- Meher Acharia-Dar
- Diksha Sharma Raina
- Subroto Bhattacharjee

== Episodes ==
=== Series overview ===
| Series | Episodes | Originally released |
|---|---|---|
| 1 | 6 | 10 June 2022 |
| 2 | 6 | 7 October 2022 |

=== Season 1 ===
| No. overall | No. in season | Title | Directed by | Written by | Original release date |
|---|---|---|---|---|---|
| 1 | 1 | "Feels Like Responsibility" | Sahir Raza | Chiranjeevi Bajpai | 10 June 2022 |
| 2 | 2 | "Feels Like Give and Take" | Sahir Raza | Chiranjeevi Bajpai | 10 June 2022 |
| 3 | 3 | "Feels Like Summer" | Sahir Raza | Chiranjeevi Bajpai | 10 June 2022 |
| 4 | 4 | "Feels Like Finding Yourself" | Sahir Raza | Chiranjeevi Bajpai | 10 June 2022 |
| 5 | 5 | "Feels Like Family" | Sahir Raza | Chiranjeevi Bajpai | 10 June 2022 |
| 6 | 6 | "Feels Like Choices" | Sahir Raza | Chiranjeevi Bajpai | 10 June 2022 |

=== Season 2 ===
| No. overall | No. in season | Title | Directed by | Written by | Original release date |
|---|---|---|---|---|---|
| 7 | 1 | "Feels Like Fixing Yourself" | Sahir Raza | Chiranjeevi Bajpai | 7 October 2022 |
| 8 | 2 | "Feels Like Fear" | Sahir Raza | Chiranjeevi Bajpai | 7 October 2022 |
| 9 | 3 | "Feels Like Rock Bottom" | Sahir Raza | Chiranjeevi Bajpai | 7 October 2022 |
| 10 | 4 | "Feels Like Acceptance" | Sahir Raza | Chiranjeevi Bajpai | 7 October 2022 |
| 11 | 5 | "Feels Like Hope" | Sahir Raza | Chiranjeevi Bajpai | 7 October 2022 |
| 12 | 6 | "Feels Like Home" | Sahir Raza | Chiranjeevi Bajpai | 7 October 2022 |

== Production ==
=== Casting ===
Sidhanta Mathur approached Prit Kamani, Anshuman Malhotra, Vishnu Kaushal and Mihir Ahuja to star in the series.

=== Development ===
The series was announced by Lionsgate Play on 25 August 2021.

=== Release ===
The trailer of the series was released on 25 May 2022. The first season consisting of six episodes premiered on Lionsgate Play on 10 June 2022.
