= Middle Class Abbayi =

2017 Indian film by Venu Sriram

- Theatrical release poster
- Directed by: Venu Sriram
- Written by: Venu Sriram
- Produced by: Dil Raju
- Starring: Nani; Sai Pallavi; Bhumika Chawla; Vijay Varma
- Cinematography: Sameer Reddy
- Edited by: Prawin Pudi
- Music by: Devi Sri Prasad
- Production company: Sri Venkateswara Creations
- Distributed by: Sri Venkateswara Creations
- Release date: 21 December 2017
- Running time: 144 mins.
- Country: India
- Language: Telugu
- Budget: ₹25 crore
- Box office: est. ₹70 crore

Middle Class Abbayi (transl. Middle class boy), also known as MCA, is a 2017 Indian Telugu-language action comedy film directed by Venu Sriram and produced by Dil Raju. The film stars Nani, Sai Pallavi, Bhumika Chawla and Vijay Varma in the lead roles. Devi Sri Prasad composed the soundtrack and score, while Sameer Reddy and Prawin Pudi handled the cinematography and editing.

Middle Class Abbayi was released theatrically on 21 December 2017 and received mixed reviews from critics, but became a commercial success. It was remade in Hindi as Nikamma (2022).

== Plot ==
Nani, a middle-class youth gifted with eidetic memory, resides at his uncle's house in Hyderabad. He harbours deep resentment towards his elder brother Ravi's wife, Jyothi, an assertive RTO officer, believing she has distanced him from his brother. When Jyothi receives a job transfer to Warangal, Ravi asks Nani to accompany her and assist her with settling into the new city. While in Warangal, Nani meets Pallavi, a young woman who unexpectedly proposes to him during their very first encounter.

Nani soon discovers that Pallavi is actually Jyothi's cousin. Pallavi reveals that she fell in love with Nani after seeing during Jyothi's wedding. Upon learning of their romance, Jyothi sends Pallavi back to their village while secretly attempting to convince Pallavi's father to approve of the marriage, though he refuses due to Nani's lack of settled employment. Simultaneously, Jyothi pushes Nani to secure a career.

Meanwhile, during an inspection, Jyothi seizes two illegal buses wearing identical registration numbers owned by "Shiva Shakti Travels", an empire run by "Warangal" Siva, a ruthless local gangster. Enraged by the seizure of his assets, Siva threatens Jyothi at her office. Overhearing the confrontation and finally realizing Jyothi's selfless sacrifices for his family, Nani steps in, assaults Siva in public, and warns him to stay away. Though Jyothi compels Nani to apologize, Siva discretely challenges him to a bet, vowing to murder Jyothi while challenging him to protect her without alerting her about the danger.

Siva executes multiple schemes to eliminate Jyothi, but Nani uses his photographic memory and quick thinking to foil every attempt. Escalating the conflict, Siva kidnaps Jyothi and conceals her inside one of the seized buses parked in a massive parking lot. When Nani confronts him, Siva attempts suicide to take the location to his grave, but survives in critical condition, becoming a comatose. Using his detailed visual memory of the bus yard, Nani locates the specific bus and rescues Jyothi in time. Siva awakens in the hospital with complete amnesia, leaving his criminal life behind and befriending Nani believing he saved his life. With peace restored, Nani marries Pallavi.

== Cast ==
- Nani as Nani
- Sai Pallavi as Pallavi "Chinni", Jyothi's sister
- Bhumika Chawla as Jyothi, Nani's sister-in-law
- Vijay Varma as Shiva Shakti alias "Warangal" Shiva
- Rajeev Kanakala as Ravi, Nani's elder brother and Jyothi's Husband
- Naresh as Nani's uncle
- Aamani as Nani's aunt
- Priyadarshi Pullikonda as Darshan alias Darshi
- Posani Krishna Murali as Pallavi's father
- Pavitra Lokesh as Siva's mother
- Vennela Kishore as a software consultant
- Mahadevan as an RTO Officer
- Racha Ravi as Nani's friend
- Ashritha Vemuganti as a doctor
- Subhalekha Sudhakar as D. Srinivas
- Rakesh Varre as Rakesh
- Rupa Lakshmi

== Music ==
The music was composed by Devi Sri Prasad and was distributed by Aditya Music.

Middle Class Abbayi

Soundtrack album by Devi Sri Prasad
- Released: 11 December 2017
- Recorded: 2017
- Genre: Soundtrack
- Length: 19:14
- Label: Aditya Music
- Producer: Devi Sri Prasad

Devi Sri Prasad chronology
Vunnadhi Okate Zindagi (2017)	Middle Class Abbayi (2017)	Rangasthalam (2018)

No.	Title	Lyrics	Singer(s)	Length
1.	"MCA Title Song"	Chandrabose	Nakash Aziz	3:41
2.	"Kothaga"	Sri Mani	Sagar, Priya Hemesh	4:38
3.	"Yemaindho Teliyadu Naaku"	Sri Mani	Karthik, Deepika V	4:10
4.	"Family Party"	Sri Mani	Jaspreet Jasz	4:01
5.	"Yevandoi Nani Garu"	Balaji	Divya Kumar, Sravana Bhargavi	4:30
Total length:				19:14

== Release ==
The film was released on 21 December 2017. The Times of India reported that the film was released in over 900 screens. The theatrical rights of the film were sold at a cost of ₹30 crore. BlueSky Cinemas have acquired the distribution rights of the film in the United States for ₹3.50 crore. Sakshi Post reported that the film was released in over 150 screens across North America.

The film was also dubbed and released in Tamil as Middle Class Aambala. It was also dubbed in Kannada as Middle Class Huduga.

== Reception ==
=== Box office ===
On its opening day, the film collected a total gross of ₹28 crore worldwide. As of 8 January 2018, the film grossed US$1.07 million (₹6.85 crore) at the United States box office. By the end of its theatrical run, Middle Class Abbayi grossed ₹70 crore worldwide, with the distributors' share of ₹40 crore.

=== Awards ===
SIIMA Award for Best Supporting Actress – Telugu - Bhumika Chawla

=== Critical response ===
On the review aggregator website Rotten Tomatoes, 60% of 5 critics' reviews are positive, with an average rating of 5/10.

Hemanth Kumar of Firstpost gave 3/5 stars and wrote "MCA is not a bad film, but it also leaves you with a feeling that it could have been a lot more. Sify gave 2.75/5 stars and wrote "Nani and Sai Pallavi's romantic thread is the major highlight in this otherwise regular commercial movie that is too bland".

Neeshita Nyayapati of The Times of India gave 2.5/5 stars and wrote "MCA is good enough for a one-time watch, especially if you're a Nani fan or a sucker for family dramas". Manoj Kumar R of The Indian Express gave 2.5/5 stars and wrote "Venu has banked heavily on the charming performances of Nani and Pallavi to make MCA click with the audience, as his writing is unambitious and mostly filled with clichés like his idea of middle class".

Sowmya Rajendran of The News Minute wrote "Middle Class Abbayi is a middling entertainer with a lot of fresh ideas that unnecessarily turns into a routine drama". Sangeetha Devi Dundoo of The Hindu wrote "Three versatile performers are the saving grace in this partly entertaining and partly middling film".

== Remake ==
The film was remade in Hindi as Nikamma and was produced by Shabbir Khan Films and Sony Pictures India. The film was released on 17 June 2022.
