= Hum Chaar =

2019 film

- Theatrical release poster
- Directed by: Abhishek Dixit
- Written by: Abhishek Dixit
- Produced by: Kamal Kumar; Barjatya; Rajkumar Barjatya; Ajit Kumar Barjatya; Sooraj Barjatya
- Starring: Prit Kamani; Simran Sharma; Anshuman Malhotra; Tushar Pandey
- Cinematography: Varun Sud
- Edited by: Paresh Manjrekar
- Music by: Team SARA; Vipin Patwa; George Joseph; Raaj Aashoo
- Production company: Rajshri Productions
- Release date: 15 February 2019
- Running time: 143 minutes
- Country: India
- Language: Hindi

Hum Chaar (transl. Us Four) is a 2019 Indian Hindi-language romantic comedy film, written and directed by Abhishek Dixit. It was produced by Rajshri Productions. The movie was creatively produced by Sooraj R. Barjatya. The film marked the acting debuts of Prit Kamani, Simran Sharma, Anshuman Malhotra and Tushar Pandey. The film was Rajshri Productions' (P) Ltd's 58th film.

== Synopsis ==
The film revolves around the emotional bond shared by four main characters: Namit, Manjari, Abeer, and Surjo, who start out as friends in college and eventually become each other's chosen family.

Manjari is not entirely immune to the influence of patriarchy and tradition. She is determined to become a doctor so that her conservative father and brother cannot force her into marriage.

Her strong, independent, and fearless nature fascinates the three boys, and they quickly become close friends. However, as time passes, all three boys discover that they are in love with Manjari and confess their feelings to each other. On her birthday, the trio decides to find out who she truly loves. However, during the celebration, some boys record a video of the trio confessing their love to Manjari while she is intoxicated. In her drunken state, Manjari admits to loving all three of them. The next morning, she does not recall anything that happened and leaves abruptly.

The video is posted on YouTube, causing a rift between the trio and the boy who posted it. A physical altercation ensues, and a chemical is accidentally spilled on the boy. The trio then turns on each other and breaks up, leading to an exploration of the concept that in modern times, friends can become family.

== Cast ==
- Prit Kamani as Namit
- Simran Sharma as Manjari Mishra
- Anshuman Malhotra as Abeer
- Tushar Pandey as Surjo
- Himanshu Ashok Malhotra as Aarambh
- Veebha Aanand as Savita
- Jatin Goswami as Ravikant
- Alok Pandey as Vikram Yadav

== Production ==
The film was announced by Rajshri Productions on 12 November 2018, on the third anniversary of their last release, Prem Ratan Dhan Payo.

== Soundtrack ==
Hum Chaar

Soundtrack album by Team SARA, Vipin Patwa, George Joseph and Raaj Aashoo
- Released: 4 January 2019
- Recorded: 2018
- Genre: Feature Film Soundtrack
- Length: 24:07
- Label: Zee Music Company

Vipin Patwa and Raaj Aashoo chronology
Kaashi in Search of Ganga (2018)	Hum Chaar (2019)

The music of the film was composed by Team SARA, Vipin Patwa, George Joseph and Raaj Aashoo with lyrics written by Shabbir Ahmed and Abhishek Dixit. The film's score was composed by George Joseph.

Track listing
No.	Title	Music	Singer(s)	Length
1.	"Friends Bhi Family Hain" (lyrics by Abhishek Dixit)	George Joseph	Aaman Trikha, Rajiv Sundaresan	2:30
2.	"Tum Aisi Kyun Ho"	Team SARA	Sameer Khan	5:03
3.	"Duffermasti"	Team SARA	Neeraj Shridhar	3:34
4.	"Auliya"	Vipin Patwa	Atif Aslam	4:02
5.	"Manmeet Mere"	Raaj Aashoo	Mohit Chauhan	4:43
6.	"Gussa Tera Jayaz Hai"	Team SARA	Sameer Khan, Asees Kaur	4:25
Total length:				24:17
