= Dhamli =

- village
- Location in Rajasthan, India
- Coordinates: 25°43′N 73°45′E
- Country: India
- State: Rajasthan
- District: Pali

Population
  - Total: 2,550

Languages
  - Official: Hindi
- Time zone: UTC+5:30 (IST)
- PIN: 306501
- ISO 3166 code: RJ-IN
- Vehicle registration: RJ-
- Coastline: 0 kilometres (0 mi)
- Nearest city: Pali
- Lok Sabha constituency: Pali
- Avg. summer temperature: 45 °C (113 °F)
- Avg. winter temperature: 05 °C (41 °F)

Dhamli is a village in Rajasthan, India.
