= List of songs recorded by Neeti Mohan =

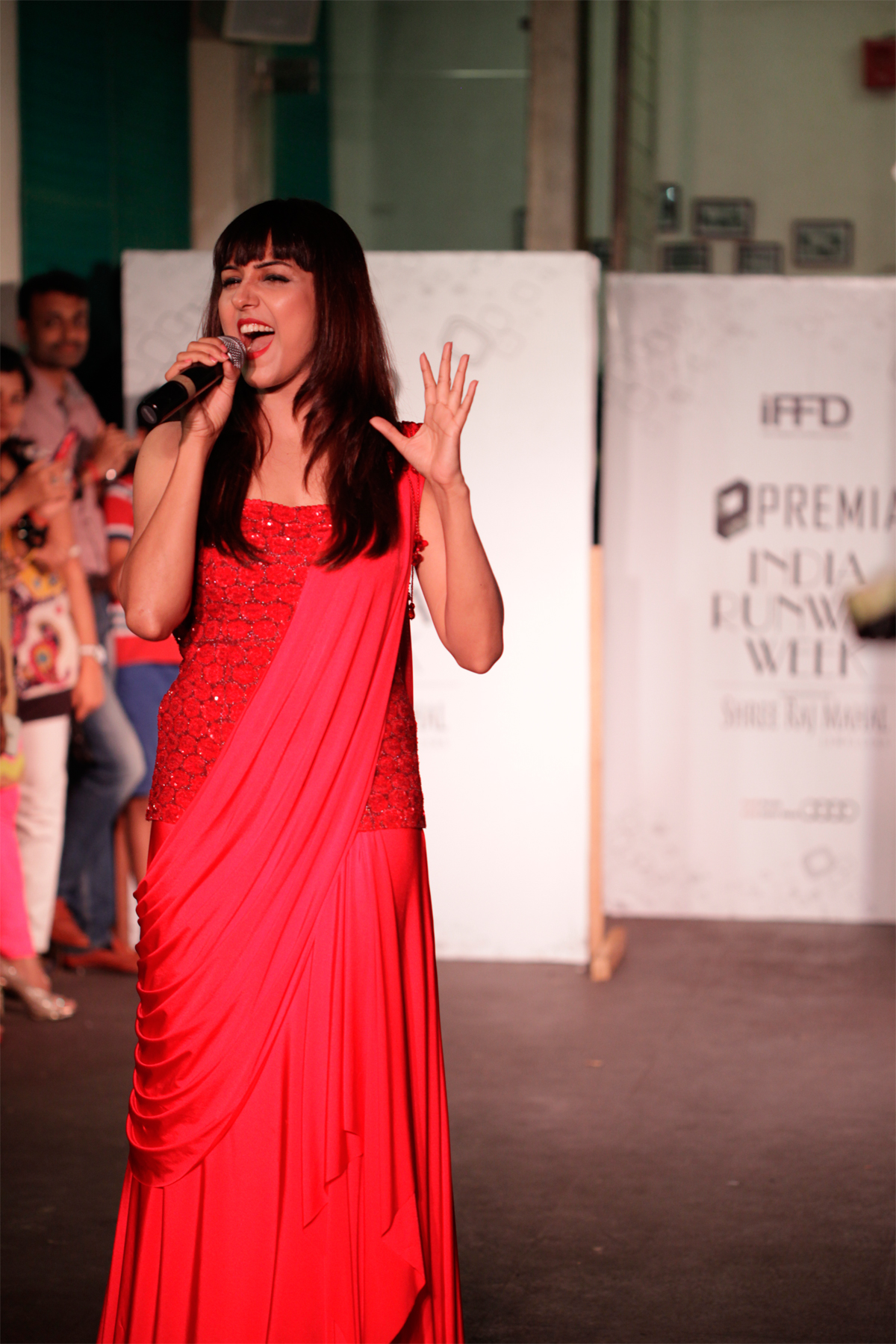
Neeti Mohan at Premia India Runway Week, 2014

Neeti Mohan is an Indian popular singer. She was one of the winners of the Channel V show Popstars and as such, became a member of the Indian pop group Aasma with the other winners of the show. She was also on the Star Plus show Music Ka Maha Muqqabla, where she was part of the winning team Shankar's Rockstars led by Shankar Mahadevan. She is a regular on A. R. Rahman live shows.

== Hindi Film songs ==
=== 2009 ===
Film	Song	Composer(s)	Writer(s)	Co-singer(s)
Fruit and Nut	"Bhangda Paale O Mere Sang"	Sangeet-Siddharth	Saajan Aggarwal	Sangeet Siddharth, Siddharth Haldipur
Fruit and Nut	"Bhangda Paale O Mere Sang" (Remix Version)	Sangeet-Siddharth	Saajan Aggarwal	Mahua Kamat

=== 2010 ===
Film	Song	Composer(s)	Writer(s)	Co-singer(s)
Mallika	"Shah E Khubaan"	Pritam	Sudhakar Sharma	Amjad Bagadwa
Bird Idol	"Hey You Muskurumber"	Sangeet-Siddharth	Sreekanth Agneeswaran	Shaan
Bird Idol	"Hey You Muskurumber" (Remix Version)	Sangeet-Siddharth	Sreekanth Agneeswaran	Neeraj Shridhar

=== 2012 ===
Film	Song	Composer(s)	Writer(s)	Co-singer(s)	Ref.
Student of the Year	"Ishq Wala Love"	Vishal–Shekhar	Anvita Dutt Guptan	Salim Merchant, Shekhar Ravjiani	
Jab Tak Hai Jaan	"Jiya Re"	A. R. Rahman	Gulzar		
Bittoo Boss	"Bittoo Sab Ki Lega"	Raghav Sachar	Luv Ranjan	Mika Singh, Natalie Di Luccio	

=== 2013 ===
Film	Song	Composer(s)	Writer(s)	Co-singer(s)	Ref.
Nautanki Saala!	"Saadi Galli Aaja"	Ayushmann Khurrana, Rochak Kohli	Ayushmann Khurrana, Rochak Kohli, Gurpreet Saini	Ayushmann Khurrana	
Nautanki Saala!	"Saadi Galli Aaja" (Remix Version)	Ayushmann Khurrana, Rochak Kohli	Ayushmann Khurrana, Rochak Kohli, Gurpreet Saini	Ayushmann Khurrana	
Nautanki Saala!	"Saadi Galli Aaja" (Unplugged Version)	Ayushmann Khurrana, Rochak Kohli	Ayushmann Khurrana, Rochak Kohli, Gurpreet Saini	Ayushmann Khurrana	
Gippi	"Dil Kaagzi"	Vishal–Shekhar	Anvita Dutt Guptan		
Raanjhanaa	"Nazar Laaye"	A. R. Rahman	Irshad Kamil	Rashid Ali	
Chennai Express	"Kashmir Main Tu Kanyakumari"	Vishal–Shekhar	Amitabh Bhattacharya	Sunidhi Chauhan, Arijit Singh	
Boss	"Har Kisi Ko" (Duet Version)	Kalyanji–Anandji (Recreated by Chirantan Bhatt)	Manoj Yadav	Arijit Singh	
Gori Tere Pyaar Mein	"Naina"	Vishal–Shekhar	Kausar Munir	Kamal Khan	

=== 2014 ===
Film	Song	Composer(s)	Writer(s)	Co-singer(s)	Ref.
Gunday	"Tune Maari Entriyaan"	Sohail Sen	Irshad Kamil	Vishal Dadlani, KK, Bappi Lahiri	
Shaadi Ke Side Effects	"I'm Sorry Par Tumse Pyaar Ho Gaya" (The Hey Song)	Pritam Chakraborty	Swanand Kirkire	Nikhil Paul George, Mili Nair	
Darr @ The Mall	"Pinacolada"	Shankar–Ehsaan–Loy	Amitabh Bhattacharya	Aditi Singh Sharma	
Darr @ The Mall	"Pinacolada" (Remix Version)	Shankar–Ehsaan–Loy	Amitabh Bhattacharya	Aditi Singh Sharma	
Bewakoofiyaan	"Khamakhaan"	Raghu Dixit	Habib Faisal	Ayushmann Khurrana	
O Teri	"Akhan Vich"	G.J. Singh	Kumaar	G.J. Singh, Jaspreet Jasz	
Main Tera Hero	"Galat Baat Hai"	Sajid–Wajid	Kausar Munir	Javed Ali	
Kaanchi	"Kambal Ke Neeche"	Ismail Darbar	Irshad Kamil	Aman Trikha, Aishwarya Majmudar & Sanchita Bhattacharya	
The Xposé	"Catch Me If You Can"	Himesh Reshammiya	Kumaar	Himesh Reshammiya, Mika Singh, Mohit Chauhan, Shubhangi Tiwari, Shalmali Kholgade	
The Xposé	"Catch Me If You Can" (Remix Version)	Himesh Reshammiya	Kumaar	Himesh Reshammiya, Mika Singh, Mohit Chauhan, Shubhangi Tiwari, Shalmali Kholgade	
The Xposé	"Dard Dilo Ke" (Remix Version)	Himesh Reshammiya	Sameer	Mohammad Irfan Ali	
The Xposé	"Dard Dilo Ke" (Reprise Version)	Himesh Reshammiya	Sameer	Mohammad Irfan Ali	
The Xposé	"Theme Of Xpose"	Himesh Reshammiya	Sameer		
CityLights	"Darbadar"	Jeet Gannguli	Rashmi Singh		
Humshakals	"Caller Tune"	Himesh Reshammiya	Sameer	Neeraj Shridhar	
Humshakals	"Look Into My Eyes"	Himesh Reshammiya	Sameer	Ash King	
Kick	"Tu Hi Tu" (Remix Version)	Himesh Reshammiya	Mayur Puri		
Kick	"Tu Hi Tu" (House Mix Version)	Himesh Reshammiya	Mayur Puri		
Mumbai Delhi Mumbai	"Raahi Raahi"	Rohan	Rohan Gokhale	Tochi Raina	
Bang Bang!	"Bang Bang"	Vishal–Shekhar	Vishal Dadlani	Benny Dayal	
Titoo MBA	"Kyu Hua" (Reprise Version)	Arjuna Harjai	Kumaar		
Sonali Cable	"Sapney Apney"	Daniel B. George	Kausar Munir		
Happy New Year	"India Waale"	Vishal–Shekhar	Irshad Kamil	Vishal Dadlani, KK, Shankar Mahadevan	
Happy New Year	"India Waale" (Electronic Version)	Vishal–Shekhar	Irshad Kamil	Vishal Dadlani, KK, Shankar Mahadevan	
Happy New Year	"World Dance Medley"	Vishal–Shekhar	Irshad Kamil	KK, Vishal Dadlani, Sukhwinder Singh, Shankar Mahadevan, Shahrukh Khan	
Roar	"Khatra"	John Stewart	Kartik Chaudhry	Bonnie Chakraborty	
Ungli	"Aadarniya Ungli"	Gulraj Singh	Manoj Yadav	Vishal Dadlani	
Action Jackson	"Keeda"	Himesh Reshammiya	Shabbir Ahmed	Himesh Reshammiya	
Action Jackson	"Keeda" (Remix Version)	Himesh Reshammiya	Shabbir Ahmed	Himesh Reshammiya	
Action Jackson	"Keeda" (Reprise Version)	Himesh Reshammiya	Shabbir Ahmed	Himesh Reshammiya	
Action Jackson	"Punjabi Mast"	Himesh Reshammiya	Sameer	Himesh Reshammiya, Ankit Tiwari, Arya Acharya, Alam Gir Khan, Vineet Singh	
Action Jackson	"Punjabi Mast" (Remix Version)	Himesh Reshammiya	Sameer	Himesh Reshammiya, Ankit Tiwari, Arya Acharya, Alam Gir Khan, Vineet Singh	
Action Jackson	"Gangster Baby"	Himesh Reshammiya	Shabbir Ahmed	Neeraj Shridhar	
Lingaa (Dubbed version)	"Mona Gasolina"	A. R. Rahman	Gulzar	Mano	

=== 2015 ===
Film	Song	Composer(s)	Writer(s)	Co-singer(s)	Ref.
I (Dubbed Version)	"Issak Taari"	A. R. Rahman	Irshad Kamil	Nakash Aziz	
I (Dubbed Version)	"Issak Taari" (Remix version)	A. R. Rahman	Irshad Kamil	Nakash Aziz	
Hawaizaada	"Maazaa My Lord"	Mangesh Dhakde	Vibhu Virender Puri	Mohit Chauhan	
NH10	"Khoney De"	Bann Chakraborty	Bann Chakraborty	Mohit Chauhan	
Mr. X	"Aalif Se"	Ankit Tiwari	Mohnish Raza	Ankit Tiwari	
Bombay Velvet	"Mohabbat Buri Bimari" (Version 2)	Amit Trivedi	Amitabh Bhattacharya		
Bombay Velvet	"Ka Kha Gha"	Amit Trivedi	Amitabh Bhattacharya		
Bombay Velvet	"Dhadaam Dhadaam"	Amit Trivedi	Amitabh Bhattacharya		
Bombay Velvet	"Naak Pe Gussa"	Amit Trivedi	Amitabh Bhattacharya		
Bombay Velvet	"Sylvia"	Amit Trivedi	Amitabh Bhattacharya		
Bombay Velvet	"Behroopia"	Amit Trivedi	Amitabh Bhattacharya	Mohit Chauhan	
Baahubali (Dubbed version)	"Khoya Hain"	M. M. Keeravani	Manoj Muntashir	Kala Bhairava	
Baahubali (Dubbed version)	"Manohari"	M. M. Keeravani	Manoj Muntashir	Divya Kumar	
Brothers	"Sapna Jahan"	Ajay–Atul	Amitabh Bhattacharya	Sonu Nigam	
Katti Batti	"Sarfira"	Shankar–Ehsaan–Loy	Kumaar	Siddharth Mahadevan	
Shaandaar	"Nazdeekiyaan"	Amit Trivedi	Amitabh Bhattacharya	Nikhil Paul George	
Shaandaar	"Senti Wali Mental"	Amit Trivedi	Amitabh Bhattacharya	Arijit Singh, Swanand Kirkire, Amit Trivedi	
Puli (Dubbed Version)	"Teri Meri"	Devi Sri Prasad	Raqueeb Alam	Devi Sri Prasad	
Prem Ratan Dhan Payo	"Tod Tadaiyya"	Himesh Reshammiya	Irshad Kamil	Neeraj Shridhar	
Hate Story 3	"Tumhe Apna Banane Ka"	Amaal Mallik	Rashmi Virag	Armaan Malik	
Yaara Silly Silly	"Yun Hai"	Ankit Tiwari	Sandeep Nath		
Ishq Click	"Ishq Mein"	Satish-Ajay	Shelly		

=== 2016 ===
Film	Song	Composer(s)	Writer(s)	Co-singer(s)	Ref.
Sanam Teri Kasam	"Kheech Meri Photo"	Himesh Reshammiya	Sameer	Darshan Raval, Akasa Singh	
Sanam Teri Kasam	"Ek Number"	Himesh Reshammiya	Sameer	Himesh Reshammiya	
Sanam Teri Kasam	"Haal - E - Dil"	Himesh Reshammiya	Sameer		
Ishq Forever	"Expectations"	Nadeem Saifi	Sameer		
Teraa Surroor	"Wafa Ne Bewafai"	Himesh Reshammiya	Sameer	Arijit Singh, Suzanne D'Mello	
Ki & Ka	"Kabir Most Wanted Munda"	Meet Bros	Kumaar	Meet Bros, Papon, Arjun Kapoor	
Housefull 3	"Taang Uthake"	Sohail Sen	Sameer Sen, Farhad-Sajid,	Sohail Sen, Mika Singh, Mamta Sharma	
Happy Bhag Jayegi	"Gabru Ready To Mingle Hai"	Sohail Sen	Mudassar Aziz, Dee MC	Mika Singh, Tarannum Mallik, Danish Sabri, Dianne	
Baar Baar Dekho	"Sau Aasmaan"	Amaal Mallik	Kumaar	Armaan Malik	
Parched	"Mai Ri Mai"	Hitesh Sonik	Swanand Kirkire	Armaan Malik	Harshdeep Kaur
Tum Bin II	"Masta"	Ankit Tiwari	Manoj Muntashir	Vishal Dadlani	

=== 2017 ===
Film	Song	Composer(s)	Writer(s)	Co-singer(s)
OK Jaanu	"Jee Lein"	A. R. Rahman	Gulzar	A. R. Rahman, Arjun Chandy, Savithri R Prithvi
Jolly LLB 2	"Bawara Mann"	Chirantan Bhatt	Junaid Wasi	Jubin Nautiyal
Mubarakan	"The Goggle Song"	Amaal Mallik	Kumaar	Sonu Nigam, Armaan Malik, Amaal Mallik, Tulsi Kumar
Jab Harry Met Sejal	"Raula"	Pritam	Irshad Kamil	Diljit Dosanjh
Baadshaho	"Piya More"	Ankit Tiwari	Manoj Muntashir	Mika Singh
Baadshaho	"Socha Hai"	Rahul Dev Burman	Manoj Muntashir	Jubin Nautiyal, Kishore Kumar, Asha Bhosle
Lucknow Central	"Meer-E-Kaarwan"	Rochak Kohli	Adheesh Verma	Amit Mishra
Qarib Qarib Singlle	"Tanha Tanha"	Rochak Kohli	Hussain Haidry	Antara Mitra

=== 2018 ===
Film	Song	Composer(s)	Writer(s)	Co-singer(s)
Padmaavat	"Nainowalo Ne"	Sanjay Leela Bhansali	Siddharth-Garima	Shyam Panchmatia
Hate Story 4	"Boond Boond"	Arko Pravo Mukherjee	Manoj Muntashir	Jubin Nautiyal
Hate Story 4	"Naam Hai Mera"	Tanishk Bagchi	Shabbir Ahmed	
Sonu Ke Titu Ki Sweety	"Kaun Nachdi"	Guru Randhawa, Rajat Nagpal	Guru Randhawa	Guru Randhawa
Dil Juunglee	"Nachle Na"	Guru Randhawa, Rajat Nagpal	Guru Randhawa	Guru Randhawa
Genius	"Tujhse Kahan Juda Hoon Main"	Himesh Reshammiya	Manoj Muntashir	Himesh Reshammiya, Vinit Singh

=== 2019 ===
Film	Song	Composer(s)	Writer(s)	Co-singer(s)
Kalank	"First Class"	Pritam Chakraborty	Amitabh Bhattacharya	Arijit Singh
Music Teacher	"Sambhaal Rakhiyan"	Rochak Kohli	Gurpreet Saini	
Music Teacher	"Ik Mod"	Rochak Kohli	Gurpreet Saini	
Student of the Year 2	"Fakira"	Vishal–Shekhar		Sanam Puri
Bharat	"Aithey Aa"	Vishal–Shekhar		Kamaal Khan, Akasa Singh
Kissebaaz	Teri Parchaayiaan			Rohan Pradhan
Cabaret	Mohe Aaye Na Jag Se Laaj	Tony Kakkar		
Saaho	"Bad Boy"	Badshah	Badshah	Badshah
Pagalpanti	"Walla Walla"	Nayeem-Shabir		Nakash Aziz
Love U Turn (film)	"Naino Ki Yaari"	Hitesh Modak	Shelle	Abhishek Nailwal

=== 2020 ===
Film	Song	Composer(s)	Writer(s)	Co-singer(s)
Bhangra Paa Le	"Ranjhan"	JAM8	Mandy Gill	Tushar Joshi
Street Dancer 3D	"Nachi-Nachi"	Sachin–Jigar		Dhvani Bhanushali, Millind Gaba
Khaali Peeli	"Duniya Sharma Jaayegi"	Vishal–Shekhar	Kumaar, Raj Shekhar	Nakash Aziz
Ginny Weds Sunny	"Phoonk Phoonk"	Gaurav Chatterji	Sandeep Gaur	Jatinder Singh, Harjot Dhillon
Indoo Ki Jawani	"Dil Tera"	Rochak Kohli	Gurpreet Saini, Gautam G Sharma	Benny Dayal

=== 2021 ===
Denotes films that have not yet been released

Film	Song	Composer	Writer	Co-singer (s)
Pagglait	"Dil Udd Ja Re"	Arijit Singh	Neelesh Misra	Sunny M.R.
Time to Dance	"Time to Dance"	Vishal Mishra	Kumaar	Vishal Mishra
Koi Jaane Na	"Rabb Maneya"	Rochak Kohli, Vikram Nagi	Manoj Muntashir, R P Deewana	Lakhwinder Wadali
Hungama 2	"Chinta Na Kar"	Anu Malik	Sameer Anjaan	Nakash Aziz
Bhuj: The Pride Of India	"Rammo Rammo"	Tanishk Bagchi	Manoj Muntashir	Udit Narayan, Palak Muchhal
Sooryavanshi	"Mere Yaara"	JAM8	Rashmi Virag	Arijit Singh
Sooryavanshi	"Mere Yaara (Reprise)"	JAM8	Rashmi Virag	
Satyameva Jayate 2	"Meri Zindagi Hai Tu"	Rochak Kohli	Manoj Muntashir	Jubin Nautiyal
Satyameva Jayate 2	"Meri Zindagi Hai Tu (Lounge Flip)"	Rochak Kohli	Manoj Muntashir	

=== 2022 ===
Denotes films that have not yet been released

Film	Song	Composer	Writer	Co-singer (s)
Gangubai Kathiawadi	"Meri Jaan"	Sanjay Leela Bhansali	Kumaar	
Operation Romeo	"Abhi Abhi"	M.M. Keeravani	Manoj Muntashir	
Heropanti 2	"Whistle Baja 2.0"	A. R. Rahman	Mehboob	Mika Singh
Shamshera	"Fitoor"	Mithoon	Karan Malhotra	Arijit Singh
Shamshera	"Kaale Naina"	Mithoon	Mithoon, Traditional	Shadaab Faridi, Sudesh Bhosale
Samrat Prithviraj	"Hadd Kar De"	Shankar–Ehsaan–Loy	Varun Grover	
Govinda Naam Mera	"Bana Sharabi" (Female Version)	Tanishk Bagchi	Tanishk Bagchi	Tanishk Bagchi

=== 2023 ===
Denotes films that have not yet been released

Film	Song	Composer	Writer	Co-singer (s)
Gadar 2	"Chal Tere Ishq Mein"	Mithoon	Sayeed Quadri	Vishal Mishra, Shadab Faridi, Altamash Faridi, Sahil Akhtar, Shehaz Akhtar
The Great Indian Family	"Ki Farak Painda Hai"	Pritam	Amitabh Bhattacharya	Dev Negi
Yaariyan 2	"Saure Ghar"	Manan Bhardwaj	Manan Bhardwaj	Vishal Mishra

=== 2024 ===
Film	Song	Composer(s)	Writer(s)	Co-singer(s)
Yodha	"Tere Sang Ishq Hua"	Tanishk Bagchi	Kunaal Vermaa	Arijit Singh
Ae Watan Mere Watan	"Ae Watan Mere Watan - Title Track (Female Version)"	Akashdeep Sengupta	Darab Farooqui	
Mr. & Mrs. Mahi	"Tu Hain Toh (Female Version)"	Hunny-Bunny	Sagar	
Sarfira	"Khudaya"	Suhit Abhyankar	Manoj Muntashir	Sagar Bhatia, Suhit Abhyankar
Bad Newz	"Rabb Warga - Neeti Mohan Version"	Abhijeet Srivastava	Shayra Apoorva	

=== 2025 ===
Film	Song	Composer(s)	Writer(s)	Co-singer(s)
Metro... In Dino	"Das Haasil Sau Baaki"	Pritam	Sandeep Srivastava	Raghav Chaitanya

=== 2026 ===
Film	Song	Composer(s)	Writer(s)	Co-singer(s)
Chand Mera Dil	"Ishq Nibhaavan De (Female Version)"	Sachin–Jigar	Amitabh Bhattacharya	
Krishnavataram Part 1: The Heart (Hridayam)	"Shyamal Sanware"	Prasad S.	Irshad Kamil	Sonu Nigam, Prasad S.
Do Deewane Seher Mein	"Aasma Aasma"	Hesham Abdul Wahab	Abhiruchi Chand	Jubin Nautiyal

== Hindi Non-film songs ==
Year	Album	Song	Composer(s)	Writer(s)	Co-singer(s)
2003	Aasma	"Chandu Ke Characha"	Salim-Sulaiman	Abbas Tyrewala	Jimmy Felix, Sangeet Haldipur, Vasudha Sharma
2003	Aasma	"Tumse Hi Pyaar"	Smoke	Sameer	Jimmy Felix, Sangeet Haldipur, Vasudha Sharma
2003	Aasma	"Pyar"	Palash Sen	Palash Sen, Deekshant Sherawat	Jimmy Felix, Sangeet Haldipur, Vasudha Sharma
2003	Aasma	"Ghoomi Hai Hamme Sari Duniya"	Smoke	Munna Dhiman	Jimmy Felix, Sangeet Haldipur, Vasudha Sharma
2003	Aasma	"Life Mein Lafda"	Vishal Bharadwaj	Munna Dhiman	Jimmy Felix, Sangeet Haldipur, Vasudha Sharma
2003	Aasma	"Jeet Lenge Hum"	Salim-Sulaiman	Sameer	Jimmy Felix, Sangeet Haldipur, Vasudha Sharma
2003	Aasma	"Zaroori Hai"	Vishal Bhardwaj	Munna Dhiman	Jimmy Felix, Sangeet Haldipur, Vasudha Sharma
2003	Aasma	"Yeh Saara Jahaan"	Jatin-Lalit	Sameer	Jimmy Felix, Sangeet Haldipur, Vasudha Sharma
2003	Aasma	"Apni Haar Subah Nayee"	Salim-Sulaiman	Sameer	Jimmy Felix, Sangeet Haldipur, Vasudha Sharma
2016	Pyaar Manga Hai (single)	"Pyaar Manga Hai"	Abhijit Vaghani	Rashmi Virag	Armaan Malik
2017	Tu Mera Ho Gaya (single)	"Tu Mera Ho Gaya" ft. Tanvi Shinde & Abhishek Choksi	Shayadshah Shahebdin	Haider Najmi	
2017	T Series Mixtape	"Dua - Saware"	Abhijit Vaghani		Salim Merchant
2017	T Series Mixtape	"Soch Na Sake - Sab Tera"	Abhijit Vaghani		Hardy Sandhu
2017	Man Marziyan	"Man Marziyaan"	Rochak Kohli	Manoj Muntashir	
2018	UN Woman India	"Mujhe Haq Hai"	Arko		
2018	Kanha Re (single)	"Kanha Re feat. Shakti Mohan & Mukti Mohan"	Neeti Mohan	Brij Mohan Sharma	
2018	T Series Acoustic	"Tere Mere"	Abhijit Vaghani		
2018	T Series Acoustic	"Nainowale Ne"	Abhijit Vaghani		
2018	T Series Acoustic	" Ek Dil"	Abhijit Vaghani		
2019	Kithe Reh Gaya	"Kithe Reh Gaya"	Abhijit Vaghani	Kumaar	
2019	MTV Unplugged Season 8	"Chori Chori - Yaara Sili Sili"			
2019	Kudiye Ni(Single)	"Kudiye Ni"	Aparshakti Khurana		
2019	T Series Mixtape 2	"Chand Chupa- Tumhe apna banane ka"	Abhijit Vaghani		Vishal Dadlani
2019	T Series Mixtape 2	"Kahin Toh Hogi-Teri Aahatein"	Abhijit Vaghani		Shekhar Ravjiani, Abhijit Vaghani
2019	Tujhe Paane Ko(Single)	"Tujhe Paane Ko"	Abhijit Vaghani	Manoj Muntashir	Jubin Nautiyal
2019	T Series Mixtape Punjabi2	"Wah Wahi Wahh-Nikle Current"	Abhijit Vaghani		Sukhe
2019	Satguru Nanak Aaye Ne	"Satguru Nanak Aaye Ne"	Harshdeep Kaur		Harshdeep Kaur Richa Sharma Kapil Sharma Shaan Shekhar Ravjiani Shankar Mahadevan Jaspreet Narula Salim Merchant
2019	Carvaan Lounge	"Ek Pyaar Ka Nagma Hai"	Arko	Rashmi Virag	Papon
2019	Khudkhushi	"Khudkhushi"	Sourav Roy	Shabbir Ahmed	
2019	Break A Leg 2 ft. Shakti Mohan	"Break A Leg"	Harsh Upadhyay		Vishal Dadlani
2020	Aashna Ban Jaye (Women's Day)	"Aashna Ban Jaye"	Vasudha Sharma		including Vasudha Sharma, Shreya Ghoshal, Shaasha Tirupati and more.
2020	Hum Haar Nahin Manenge - A.R. Rehman	" Hum Haar Nahin Manenge "	Pratoon Joshi	A.R. Rehman	including Jonita Gandhi, Shaasha Tirupati etc.
2020	Mother's Day Special	"Rab Daa Roop"	Abhijit Vaghani	Neeti Mohan	
2020	No. 1 Yaari	"Yaara Rang Bhula De Rang"	Tanishk Bagchi		Javed Ali, Benny Dayal
2022	Single	"Roohedariyaan"			B Praak
2022	Single	"Chumma Chumma"			Nakash Aziz
2023	Single	Savaria ft Shakti Mohan, Mukti Mohan & Salman Yusuf Khan	Vikram Montrose	Shekhar Astiwa	
2023	Single	"Hey Ganaraya"			
2023	Single	"Imtihaan"			
2023	Single	"Madhurashtakam"			
2023	Single	"Bewajah"			

== Other languages ==
=== Tamil songs ===
Year	Film/Album	Song	Composer(s)	Writer(s)	Co-singer(s)
2014	Ner Ethir	"Thiruda Thiruda"	Satish Chakravarthy	Satish Chakravarthy	Satish Chakravarthy
2014	Ner Ethir	"Star Jolykkuthendru"	Satish Chakravarthy	Satish Chakravarthy	Jayapradeep
2014	I	"Mersalaayitten"	A. R. Rahman	Kabilan	Anirudh Ravichander
2014	I	"Mersalaayiten" (Remix Version)	A. R. Rahman	Kabilan	Anirudh Ravichander
2014	Lingaa	"Mona Gasolina"	A. R. Rahman	Madhan Karky	Mano, Tanvi Shah
2014	Happy New Year (D)	"Manwa Laage"	Vishal–Shekhar	P. Vijay	Vijay Prakash
2014	Happy New Year (D)	"India Waale"	Vishal–Shekhar	P. Vijay	Shankar Mahadevan, Rajiv Sundaresan, Raman, Mahadevan, Keerthi Sagathia
2014	Bang Bang!	"Bang Bang Title Song"	Vishal–Shekhar		
2015	Vasuvum Saravananum Onna Padichavanga	"Naa Romba Busy"	D. Imman	Na. Muthukumar, Snigdha Chandra	Santhosh Hariharan, Sharanya Gopinath
2015	Naanum Rowdydhaan	"Neeyum Nannum"	Anirudh Ravichander	Thamarai	Anirudh Ravichander
2015	Ko 2	"Kohila"	Leon James	Na. Muthukumar	Leon James
2015	Bajirao Mastani (D)	"Minnaadhi Minnal"	Sanjay Leela Bhansali	Madhan Karky	Shreya Ghoshal
2015	Inji Iduppazhagi	"Size Zero"	M. M. Keeravani		Prakash Raj, Rahul, M. M. Keeravani, Noel Sean
2016	Pokkiri Raja	"Rain Rain Go Go"	D. Imman	Vivek	Varun Parandhaman
2016	Theri	"Chella Kutti"	G.V. Prakash Kumar	Kabilan	Vijay
2016	Zero	"Engage Ponaai"	Nivas K Prasanna	Kabilan	Vijay Prakash
2016	Mudinja Ivana Pudi	"Hello Mister"	D Imman	Madhan Karky	Snighda
2017	Velaikkaran	"Idhayane"	Anirudh Ravichander	Madhan Karky	Anirudh Ravichander
2018	Veera	"Veerattama Veeratturiye"	Leon James	Ko Sesha	Sid Sriram
2019	Namma Veettu Pillai	Gaandakannazhagi	D. Imman	Sivakarthikeyan	Anirudh Ravichander
2020	Street Dancer 3D	"Aadu Aadu"	Sachin–Jigar	Veeramani Kannan, Tony J - Madras Macha	Dhvani Bhanushali, Millind Gaba
2021	Tamilarasan	"Pakkurappo Pakkurappo"	Ilaiyaraaja		
2022	Shamshera (D) - Tamil	"Ondraagudhae"	Mithoon	Madhan Karky	Yazin Nizar
2022	Shamshera (D) - Tamil	"Kannale"	Mithoon	Madhan Karky	Yazin Nizar, Sudesh Bhosle

=== Telugu songs ===
Year	Film/Album	Song	Composer(s)	Writer(s)	Co-singer(s)
2013	Tadakha	"Viyyalavaru"	S. Thaman	Ramajogayya Sastry	
2014	Happy New Year	"Manwa Laage"	Vishal–Shekhar	Chaitanya Prasad	
2014	Happy New Year	"India Waale"	Vishal–Shekhar	Chaitanya Prasad	
2014	Lingaa	"Monaa Monaa"	A. R. Rahman	Kandhikonda	Mano
2014	I	"Pareshanayya"	A. R. Rahman	Suddala Ashok Teja	
2014	I	"Pareshanayya" (Remix Version)	A. R. Rahman	Suddala Ashok Teja	
2014	Bang Bang!	"Bang Bang Title Song"	Vishal–Shekhar		
2015	Bajirao Mastani	"Bangaari Pori"	Sanjay Leela Bhansali	Ramajogayya Sastry	
2015	Size Zero	"Size Zero"	M. M. Keeravani		
2018	Touch Chesi Chudu	"Manasa"	Kaushik-Akash-Guddu (KAG) for JAM8	Rehman	
2019	Saaho	"Bad Boy"	Badshah	Sreejo	
2020	Street Dancer 3D	"Racha Racha"	Sachin–Jigar	Ramajogayya Sastry	
2022	Gangubai Kathiawadi	"Meri Jaan"	Sanjay Leela Bhansali		
2022	Samrat Prithviraj	"Haddhu Cheripey"	Shankar–Ehsaan–Loy		
2022	Shamshera	"Nee Paina Pichi Prema"	Mithoon	Chaitanya Prasad	Yazin Nizar
2022	Shamshera	"Aame Kallu"	Mithoon	Chaitanya Prasad	Yazin Nizar, Sudesh Bhosle
2025	Robinhood	"Adhi Dha Surprisu"	G. V. Prakash Kumar	Chandrabose	Anurag Kulkarni

=== Bengali songs ===
Year	Film/Album	Song	Composer(s)	Writer(s)	Co-singer(s)
2013	Rangbaaz	"Korishna Rangbaazi"	Jeet Gannguli	Prosen	Benny Dayal
2014	Agnee	"Nehsay Neshay"	Adit Ozbert		
2014	Game	"Party All Night"	Jeet Gannguli	Raja Chanda	Benny Dayal
2016	Sangabora	""	Raja Narayan Deb		

=== English songs ===
Year	Film/Album	Song	Composer(s)	Writer(s)	Co-singer(s)
2014	Million Dollar Arm	"Makhna"	A. R. Rahman		Sukhwinder Singh

=== Marathi songs ===
Year	Film/Album	Song	Composer(s)	Writer(s)	Co-singer(s)
2014	Hello Nandan	"Dhooan Ha Dhooan"	AV Prafullachandra	Guru Thakur	
2017	FU: Friendship Unlimited	"Uff Tuza Ha Jalwa""	Vishal Mishra		Sukhwinder Singh, Aishwarya Nigam
2019	Girlz	"Bairagi Man"	Samir Saptiskar	Sachin Pathak	
2022	Samrenu	"Jhimmad"	Suraj-Dhiraj		Kunal Ganjawala
2025	Ek Radha Ek Meera	Zara zara mi zurate, Antaricha	Vishal Mishra	Jitendra Joshi, Spruha Joshi	Vishal Mishra

=== Gujarati songs ===
Year	Film/Album	Song	Composer(s)	Writer(s)	Co-singer(s)
2016	Romance Complicated	"Rom Com"	Jatin-Pratik & Darshan Raval	Jigar Dave, Dashrath Mewal, Dhwani Gautam, Chandresh Kanadia	Rashid Ali
2026	Mitrata	"Mitrata Reprise"	Parthiv Shah	Divyesh Mungra	

=== Kannada songs ===
Year	Film/Album	Song	Composer(s)	Writer(s)	Co-singer(s)
2016	Kotigobba 2	"Hello Mister"	D Imman	V. Nagendra Prasad	Snigdha Chandra
2017	Tarak	"Ta ta ta tarakaa"	Arjun Janya	V. Nagendra Prasad	

=== Punjabi songs ===
Year	Film/Album	Song	Composer(s)	Writer(s)	Co-singer(s)
2016	Aatishbazi Ishq	"Mere Dil"	R.Sheen		Rshan Prince
