= Surabhi Dashputra =

Indian classical vocalist, lyricist and vocal educator

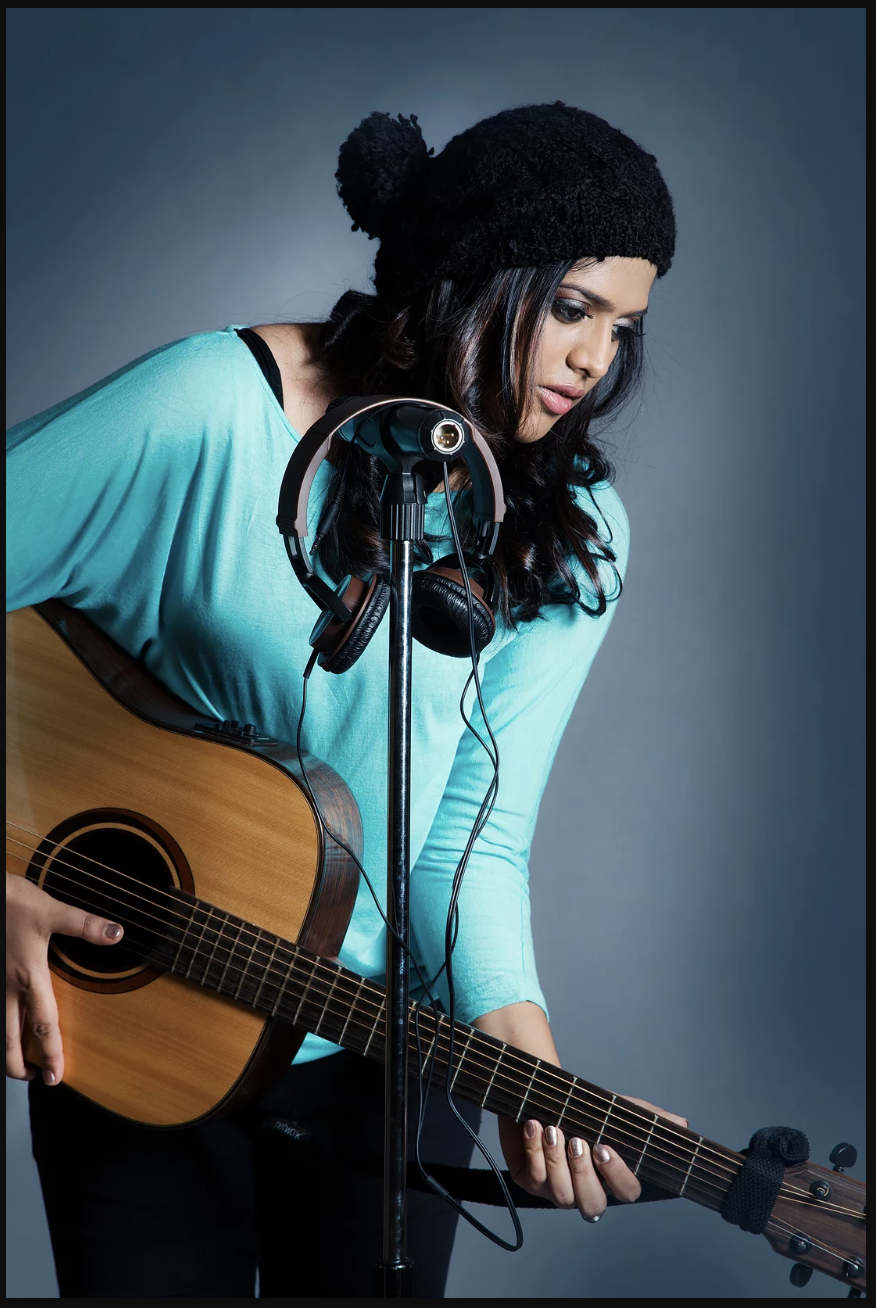
- Surabhi Dashputra

Background information
- Genres: Hindustani classical; ghazal; devotional; contemporary
- Occupations: Singer; lyricist; vocal educator
- Years active: 2005–present
- Label: Aart Sense Records
- Website: surabhidashputra.com

Surabhi Dashputra is an Indian classical and contemporary vocalist, lyricist and vocal educator based in Mumbai. A disciple of Suresh Wadkar, recipient of the Padma Shri, she has been active as a professional vocalist since 2005, working across Hindustani classical, semi-classical, ghazal, devotional and independent music. Her independent releases have reached 1.2 million yearly listeners on Spotify, with her music heard in over 100 countries. She is the founder of ASM Academy in Mumbai, through which she mentors students in Hindustani classical music across India and the United Kingdom.

== Early life and training ==
Dashputra's introduction to music came through her family, with her mother being her first musical influence and her aunt Sandhya Tailang a continuing source of inspiration. Her foundational training in alankars began with her cousin Rasika Kalgaokar. Her father played a decisive role in her musical development, accompanying her to competitions and connecting her with leading teachers throughout her early years.

She completed a six-year Visharad in Hindustani Classical Vocal from IKSV Chhattisgarh, followed by a Diploma in Semi-Classical and Light Music from the same institution. She holds a Bachelor of Arts in Indian Classical Vocal from RDVV Jabalpur, where she graduated as Gold Medallist, a Master of Performing Arts in Indian Classical Vocal from the University of Mumbai, and an M.Phil in Indian Classical Vocal, also from the University of Mumbai.

In 2005, following the completion of her school studies, she began training under Suresh Wadkar at his gurukul in Mumbai. Under his guidance she developed her understanding of timing, expression and diction, and deepened her practice of riyaaz. It was also at the gurukul that she first met composer Arjuna Harjai, a musical partnership that would span more than two decades. She served as a faculty member at Ajivasan Music Academy from 2006 to 2016, having begun teaching at Suresh Wadkar's gurukul as part of her training there.

== Career ==
=== Early career and Bollywood ===
Dashputra began her professional career composing jingles and working as a vocalist in the Bollywood entertainment industry. She appeared as a vocalist on MTV Coke Studio Season 3 alongside music producer Hitesh Sonik and Vijay Prakash.

Her feature film work includes the soundtracks for Calapor (2013) and Titoo MBA (2014), the latter featuring her collaboration with composer Arjuna Harjai on songs including "O Soniye", featuring Arijit Singh, and "Atyachaari". She also contributed to the soundtrack of Chudail (2014) and Judgementall Hai Kya (2019).

=== Independent music ===
From 2021 onwards Dashputra expanded significantly as an independent artist, releasing original music through digital platforms. Her releases including "More Sajan", "Rahiya Ve" and "Dil Vich Rab" have collectively crossed 2 million streams on Spotify, reaching 1.2 million yearly listeners with her music heard in over 100 countries.

In 2025 she co-wrote the lyrics for "Dhul Gaye", composed by Arjuna Harjai and sung by Arijit Singh, released under Oriyon Music. The track was noted for its emotional depth and Dashputra's lyrical contribution to the narrative. She and Harjai were also featured together in Rolling Stone India in September 2025 for their single "Jism Ya Rooh".

In 2026 she collaborated with Arjuna Harjai on the Punjabi pop track "Ludhiyane Waleya", released through Aart Sense Records, described as a crossover between her classical training and contemporary global production. She is also working on a four song EP with Aart Sense Records alongside fusion pieces blending folk and classical elements.

In March 2026 she was interviewed by BBC Introducing West Mids and Warwickshire, and her work has also been covered by the Times of India, Free Press Journal and Firstpost.

=== ASM Academy ===
In 2016 Dashputra founded ASM Academy in Mumbai, offering structured training in Hindustani classical, semi-classical and light music. The academy holds an academic affiliation with Gandharva Sangeet Mahavidyalaya, Miraj, and has an active student base across India and the United Kingdom. The growth of online learning expanded the academy's reach to students internationally.

=== Live performances ===
In 2019 Dashputra performed at three cultural events in London: a Women's Day cultural event at Osterley with an audience of 1,200, the Asian Food and Restaurant Awards at the Hilton London with an audience of 5,000, and a New Year's Eve celebration at Osterley Park Hotel with an audience of 4,000. In 2023 she performed at the WOW Awards at NMACC Mumbai. In 2025 she performed at the Adaaygii Thumri Concert in Mumbai and at GhazalishQ at A&M Studio.

== Filmography ==
Year	Title	As lyricist	As singer	Notes
2012	Manzoor Nahi	Single	Single	Song composed in response to the 2012 Delhi gang rape
2013	Calapor	3 songs	2 songs	
2014	Titoo MBA	3 songs	3 songs	
2014	Chudail	2 songs		
2015	Radio Shishpal	4 songs		
2019	Judgementall Hai Kya		1 song	Co-singer and composer Arjuna Harjai

== Singles ==
Year	Title	Composer	Label	Notes
2014	O Soniye	Arjuna Harjai		feat. Arijit Singh; from Titoo MBA
2014	O Ranjhna	Arjuna Harjai		
2014	Plan Bana Le	Arjuna Harjai		
2016	Rahiya Ve	Arjuna Harjai		
2016	Rab Ki Baatein	Arjuna Harjai		
2017	Laaiyan Ve	Arjuna Harjai		
2019	Kis Raste	Arjuna Harjai		from Judgemental Hai Kya
2022	Naa Jao	Arjuna Harjai	Aart Sense Records	
2023	Tum Yun Roothe			
2024	Balma		Aart Sense Records	
2024	More Sajan	Arjuna Harjai	Aart Sense Records	
2024	Mangoge Na	Arjuna Harjai	Aart Sense Records	Primary artist alongside Arjuna Harjai; Spotify Viral 50
2024	Rehn De	Arjuna Harjai	Aart Sense Records	
2024	Kadar Na Jane	Arjuna Harjai		
2024	Dil Vich Rab	Anirudh Bhola		
2025	Dhul Gaye	Arjuna Harjai	Oriyon Music	Lyrics by Surabhi Dashputra; sung by Arijit Singh
2025	Jism Ya Rooh	Arjuna Harjai	Aart Sense Records	Featured in Rolling Stone India
2025	Kaarigar	Arjuna Harjai	Aart Sense Records	
2025	SukhKarta	Surabhi Dashputra	Aart Sense Records	
2025	Ram Kahoon	Arjuna Harjai	Aart Sense Records	
2026	Ludhiyane Waleya	Arjuna Harjai	Aart Sense Records	Featured on BBC Asian Network
2026	Tu Hi Hai Channa	Arjuna Harjai	Aart Sense Records	

== Songs ==
Film	Song	Singer	Lyricist	Year
Judgementall Hai Kya	Kis raste hai jana	Surabhi Dashputra & Arjuna Harjai	Kumaar	2019
Chudail	Raat Ye Kehti Hai	Sunidhi Chauhan	Surabhi Dashputra	2015
Chudail	Das Rahe Hain	Jonita Gandhi	Surabhi Dashputra	2015
Titoo MBA	O Soniye	Arijit Singh & Vibha Saraf	Surabhi Dashputra	2014
Titoo MBA	Atyachaari	Surabhi Dashputra & Arjuna Harjai	Surabhi Dashputra	2014
Titoo MBA	Plan Bana Le	Aishwarya Nigam & Surabhi Dashputra	Kumaar	2014
Titoo MBA	O Ranjhna	Surabhi Dashputra	Surabhi Dashputra	2014
Calapor	Bindaas	Various	Surabhi Dashputra	2013
Calapor	I Love You Ma	Arjuna Harjai & Surabhi Dashputra	Surabhi Dashputra	2013
Calapor	Tarana	Surabhi Dashputra	Surabhi Dashputra	2013
Calapor	Musical	Lakshmi Madhusudan & Aishwarya Nigam	Sanjeev Chaturvedi	2013
Manzoor Nahi	Single	Surabhi Dashputra & Arjuna Harjai	Surabhi Dashputra	2012
