= Sheetal Sharma =

Indian fashion and costume designer

Sheetal Iqbal Sharma
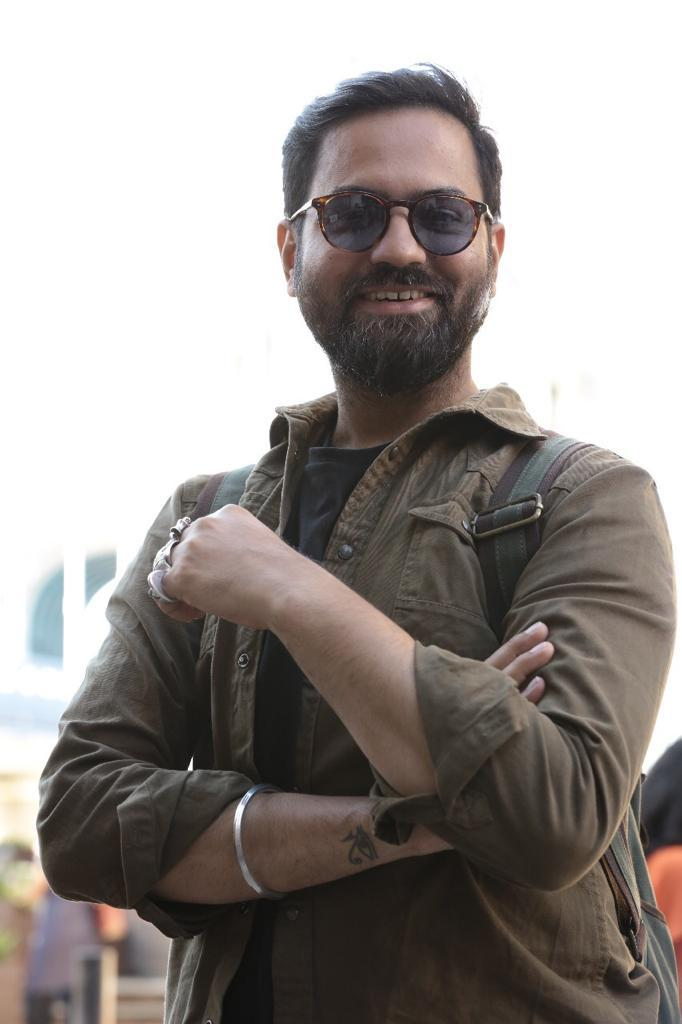
- Sheetal Sharma at Ahmedabad in 2018
- Born: 1 June 1984 (age 41); Mumbai, India
- Occupation(s): Costume designer, fashion stylist
- Years active: 2010-present
- Awards: Filmfare Award for Best Costume Design (2019),(2023)

Sheetal Iqbal Sharma (born 1 June 1984) is an Indian fashion and costume designer, who works in Hindi and Telugu films. He is known for his works in films like Miss Lovely, Airlift, Manto, Judgementall Hai Kya, Gangubai Kathiawadi, Sita Ramam and Saiyaara. He was awarded the Filmfare Award for Best Costume Design in 2019 for the film Manto (2018), and was nominated for the same award for Judgementall Hai Kya (2019).

== Early life ==
Sharma was born on 1 June 1984 in Mumbai to Iqbal Chand Sharma and Kamlesh Sharma. His father was a colonel in Indian Army so he studied at various schools. Sharma enrolled for hotel management degree which he did not complete. He completed his Bachelor of Arts from KC College, Mumbai. He graduated in fashion technology from Wigan and Leigh College, Mumbai, and received Masters in Period Costumes from London. He worked in a call center for some time. He came to notice after his work in Miss Lovely (2012), directed by Ashim Ahluwalia.

== Filmography ==
=== As a costume designer ===
Key
Denotes films that have not yet been released

Year	Title	Notes
2011	Don 2	
2012	Miss Lovely	
2012	Future to Bright Hai Ji	
2012	Love You to Death	
2013	D-Day	
2014	Bobby Jasoos	
2015	Katti Batti	
2015	Hero	
2016	Airlift	
2017	Lucknow Central	
2017	Raees	
2018	Stree	
2018	Naa Peru Surya	Telugu film
2018	Manto	
2019	Bala	
2019	Jhootha Kahin Ka	
2019	Made In China	
2019	Judgementall Hai Kya	
2019	Ek Ladki Ko Dekha Toh Aisa Laga	
2020	Kesari	
2020	Unpaused	
2020	Serious Men	
2020	Hasmukh	
2021	Indoo Ki Jawani	
2021	Hello Charlie	
2021	Sardar Ka Grandson	
2021	Mimi	
2022	Gangubai Kathiawadi	
2022	Sharmaji Namkeen	
2022	Dasvi	
2022	Hurdang	
2022	Dhaakad	
2022	Sita Ramam	Telugu film
2022	Babli Bouncer	
2022	Bhediya	
2022	Govinda Naam Mera	
2023	Gulmohar	
2023	Mrs.Chatterjee Vs Norway	
2023	Chor Nikal Ke Bhaga	
2023	Zara Hatke Zara Bachke	
2023	Tiku Weds Sheru	
2023	The Great Indian Family	
2023	The Great Indian Rescue	
2023	Animal	
2023	Hi Nanna	Telugu film
2024	Amar Singh Chamkila	
2024	Stree 2	
2024	Pushpa 2: The Rule	Telugu film
2024	Baby John	
2025	Emergency	
2025	Chhaava	
2025	Saiyaara	
2025	Rainbow	Telugu film
Pooja Meri Jaan		

=== Television ===
- 2016 – 2017 : P.O.W. - Bandi Yuddh Ke
- 2021 : Mumbai Diaries 26/11
- 2021 : The Empire

== Awards and nominations ==
Year	Work	Award	Result	Ref.
2019	Manto	Filmfare Award for Best Costume Design	Won	
2020	Judgementall Hai Kya	Filmfare Award for Best Costume Design	Nominated	
2021	The Empire	Indian Television Academy Award for Best Costume Design	Won	
2023	Gangubai Kathiawadi	Filmfare Award for Best Costume Design	Won	
