= Arjuna Harjai =

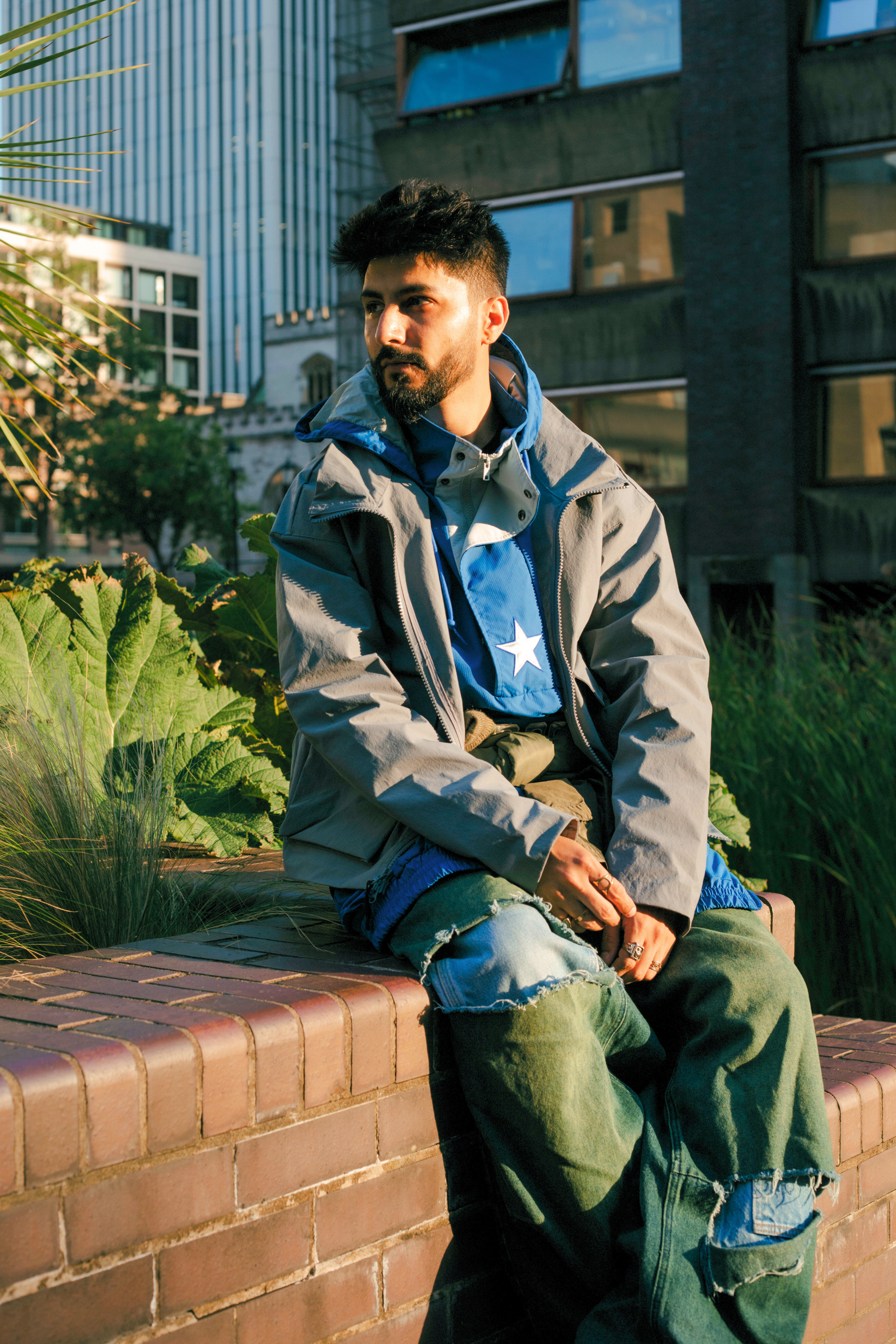

Background information
- Also known as: Arjunna Harjaie, Arjunaa Harjai & Arjun Harjai
- Born: Delhi, India
- Genres: Film score; pop; Hindustani classical
- Occupations: Singer; composer; record producer; instrumentalist
- Instruments: Piano; vocals; synthesizer
- Years active: 2009–present
- Labels: Aart Sense Records; Sony Music India
- Spouse: Divya Harjai
- Website: www.arjunaharjai.com

Arjuna Harjai is an Indian composer, singer and record producer based in the United Kingdom, working across Bollywood, independent music and advertising. Early in his career he composed "O Soniye" for the film Titoo MBA, featuring Arijit Singh in one of his early collaborations. A recipient of the Creative ABBY Awards Gold for original background score, he is known for his longstanding association with director Nikkhil Advani, his viral "The One Minute Composer" series, and collaborative work with international artists including Machel Montano, Rashmeet Kaur and Natasha Noorani. His work has been featured in Rolling Stone India, NDTV, The Times of India and BBC Asian Network, where "Zikar Hai" marked his debut as Introducing Artist of the Week in 2024. His singles "Kaajal" (2025) and "Ludhiyane Waleya" (2026) were subsequently featured on BBC Asian Network. He holds the UK Global Talent Visa under the Exceptional Talent category, endorsed by Arts Council England, recognising his contribution to the South Asian music scene in the United Kingdom.

== Early life and education ==
Harjai was born in Delhi and began learning Hindustani classical music from his parents at a young age, gaining early exposure to a wide range of musical styles. He moved to Mumbai in 2006 to study further under playback singer Suresh Wadkar. He studied piano as his primary instrument, completing Grade 8 in western classical and jazz piano at the Delhi School of Music. In 2008 he graduated from SAE Institute, Mumbai, as the highest scorer in Audio Engineering. In 2009 he studied jazz and counterpoint composition under various music exchange programmes in Delhi and Mumbai.

== Career ==
=== Early career ===
While composing advertising jingles for major brands, Harjai assisted music composer Lalit Pandit on projects including Besharam and Dabangg. He began composing for cinema when Punjabi producer Rajan Batra sought a new composer for his feature film Titoo MBA. Harjai composed the entire soundtrack, including "O Soniye", which featured Arijit Singh and Vibha Saraf. By 2022 he had composed over 500 advertising jingles and music for more than a dozen feature films. Over the course of his career in advertising and films, Harjai has worked alongside renowned lyricists including Gulzar and Irshad Kamil.

=== Breakthrough ===
Harjai's association with director Nikkhil Advani on the film Guddu Engineer and television series P.O.W. - Bandi Yuddh Ke brought him critical recognition. For P.O.W. - Bandi Yuddh Ke, Harjai composed the original score across 107 episodes and wrote six songs, lending his voice to all of them alongside Nandini Srikar, Shashaa Tirupati, Jonita Gandhi and Surabhi Dashputra. He also composed three songs, the background score and trailer soundtracks for Advani's Lucknow Central, starring Farhan Akhtar and directed by Ranjit Tiwari.

=== UK relocation and independent work ===
In 2021 Harjai relocated to the United Kingdom, initially on a dependent visa while his wife pursued a postgraduate degree. During this period he founded Aart Sense Records, an independent record label based in the UK, and continued composing remotely for Indian film and television while expanding his output as an independent artist. In 2023 he collaborated with Sounds of Isha, the music wing of Sadhguru's Isha Foundation, alongside international artists including Machel Montano, Marge Blackman and Sandeep Narayan, to create the Save Soil and Come Awake anthems in support of the Save Soil environmental movement.

Harjai manages several YouTube channels. "Arjuna Harjai" serves as his official artist channel, attached to his profile as a musician, a role it has held since 2022 when he moved his personal vlog content to a separate channel, "Arjuna & Divya Vlogs", which he runs alongside his wife and has accumulated over 160,000 subscribers.

=== The One Minute Composer (2024) ===
In 2024 Harjai launched a creative project titled "The One Minute Composer", in which he composed and released tracks based on random prompts, each produced within a minute. The series included "Winter Ayun Waliye", "Mangoge Na" and "Zikar Hai", with all three reaching Spotify's Viral 50 charts. "Zikar Hai" was a collaboration with international artist Natasha Noorani, recorded remotely between Harjai in the UK and Noorani in Lahore. The song marked Harjai's debut on BBC Asian Network, where he was named Introducing Artist of the Week in 2024.

=== Pyaar De Rang EP (2024) ===
Later in 2024 Harjai released the EP Pyaar De Rang, a collaborative project featuring Rashmeet Kaur, Natasha Noorani, JJ Esko and Surabhi Dashputra, released through Aart Sense Records.

=== 2025–2026 releases ===
In February 2025 Harjai released "Kaajal", which was featured on BBC Asian Network. Later that year he released "Karigar" with Surabhi Dashputra in October, followed in November by "Only You" featuring Neha Karode and in December by "Only You (Her)" featuring Arunima Sharma. In January 2026 he released "Tu Hi Hai Channa" with Surabhi Dashputra, followed in February 2026 by "Ludhiyane Waleya", also with Surabhi Dashputra, with lyrics by Geet Sagar. "Ludhiyane Waleya" was featured on BBC Asian Network in March 2026.

=== Global Talent Visa ===
In a significant milestone for his international career, Harjai was granted the UK Global Talent Visa under the Exceptional Talent category, endorsed by Arts Council England. The visa is awarded to individuals recognised as leaders or emerging leaders in the cultural and creative sectors, and represents formal acknowledgement by the UK government of Harjai's contribution to the international music industry.

Harjai spoke about the achievement in an interview with BBC Asian Network presenter Preeti Kullar, reflecting on his journey from Delhi to becoming an established artist and record label founder based in the UK. The recognition places him among a select group of South Asian artists to have received the designation.

== International collaborations ==
Year	Title	Artists	Organisation
2022	Come Awake	Arjuna Harjai, Machel Montano	Sounds of Isha
2022	Soil Song	Arjuna Harjai, Machel Montano, Marge Blackman	Sounds of Isha
2024	Zikar Hai	Arjuna Harjai, Natasha Noorani	Aart Sense Records

== Extended plays ==
Year	Title	Artists	Label
2024	Pyaar De Rang	Arjuna Harjai feat. Rashmeet Kaur, Natasha Noorani, JJ Esko, Surabhi Dashputra	Aart Sense Records

== Singles ==
Year	Title	Artists	Label	Lyricist	Notes
2021	Main Janu Na	Arjuna Harjai, Jonita Gandhi	Sony Music India	Surabhi Dashputra	
2021	Arjuna's Drone	Arjuna Harjai	Aart Sense Records		
2022	Naa Jao	Arjuna Harjai, Surabhi Dashputra	Aart Sense Records	Surabhi Dashputra	
2023	Shamil Hoon	Arjuna Harjai, Divya Harjai	Aart Sense Records	Arjuna Harjai	
2023	Jhoothe	Arjuna Harjai, Jyotica Tangri	Aart Sense Records	Jyotica Tangri	
2023	Kharaab	Arjuna Harjai, Jyotica Tangri	Aart Sense Records	Jyotica Tangri	
2024	Winter Ayun Waliye	Arjuna Harjai, Jyotica Tangri	Aart Sense Records	Geet Sagar	The One Minute Composer series; Spotify Viral 50
2024	More Sajan	Arjuna Harjai, Surabhi Dashputra	Aart Sense Records	Surabhi Dashputra	The One Minute Composer series
2024	Kyu Bhag Gayi Tu	Arjuna Harjai, Anubhav Suman	Aart Sense Records	Arjuna Harjai	
2024	Bharam	Arjuna Harjai	Aart Sense Records	Surabhi Dashputra	The One Minute Composer series
2024	Mangoge Na	Arjuna Harjai	Aart Sense Records	Surabhi Dashputra	The One Minute Composer series; Spotify Viral 50
2024	Kinaare	Arjuna Harjai, Shreya Jain	Aart Sense Records	Arjuna Harjai	The One Minute Composer series
2024	Challeya Ve	Arjuna Harjai	Aart Sense Records	Kumaar	
2024	Zikar Hai	Arjuna Harjai, Natasha Noorani	Aart Sense Records	Geet Sagar	The One Minute Composer series; Spotify Viral 50; BBC Asian Network debut
2024	Rehn De	Arjuna Harjai, Surabhi Dashputra	Aart Sense Records	Surabhi Dashputra	The One Minute Composer series
2025	Kaajal	Arjuna Harjai	Aart Sense Records	Priyanka R Bala	Featured on BBC Asian Network
2025	Karigar	Arjuna Harjai, Surabhi Dashputra	Aart Sense Records	Priyanka R Bala	
2025	Only You	Arjuna Harjai, Neha Karode	Aart Sense Records	Priyanka R Bala	
2025	Only You (Her)	Arjuna Harjai, Arunima Sharma	Aart Sense Records	Priyanka R Bala	
2026	Tu Hi Hai Channa	Arjuna Harjai, Surabhi Dashputra	Aart Sense Records	Priyanka R Bala	
2026	Ludhiyane Waleya	Arjuna Harjai, Surabhi Dashputra	Aart Sense Records	Geet Sagar	Featured on BBC Asian Network (March 2026)
2026	Chitthi	Arjuna Harjai,	Aart Sense Records	Surabhi Dashputra	Featured on Spotify's New Music Friday I-Pop

== Filmography ==
Year	Title	Notes
2011	Hair Is Falling	Score
2012	Manzoor Nahi	Song composed in response to the 2012 Delhi gang rape
2013	Calapor	Songs and score; also sang two songs
2014	Titoo MBA	Songs and score, including "O Soniye" featuring Arijit Singh
2014	Chudail	Music by
2016	Do Lafzon Ki Kahani	Composed song "Ankhiyaan"
2016	Guddu Engineer	Songs and score
2016	P.O.W. - Bandi Yuddh Ke	Songs, opening theme and score
2017	Mahi NRI	Music by
2017	Jindua	Composed "Laaiyan Ve" and "Takdi Ravan"
2017	Lucknow Central	3 songs, score and promos
2019	Judgemental Hai Kya	Song: "Kis Raste Hai Jana"
2019	Motichoor Chaknachoor	Song: "Choti Choti Gal"
2020	Dolly Kitty Aur Woh Chamakte Sitare	Songs: "Neat Ve" and "Bimari"

== Awards and critical reception ==
Award	Production	Director	Details	Year
5th Mumbai Shorts International Film Festival	Guddu Engineer	Nikkhil Advani	Best Music Award – Keh Nahi Paunga	2016
Creative ABBY Awards – Gold	P.O.W. - Bandi Yuddh Ke	Nikkhil Advani	Original Background Score – Rab Ki Baatein	2017
Creative ABBY Awards – Bronze	P.O.W. - Bandi Yuddh Ke	Nikkhil Advani	Original Background Score – Raahiyan Ve	2017

== Songs ==
Film	Song	Singer	Lyricist	Year
Manzoor Nahi	Single	Surabhi Dashputra & Arjuna Harjai	Surabhi Dashputra	2012
Calapor	Musical	Lakshmi Madhusudan & Aishwarya Nigam	Sanjeev Chaturvedi	2013
Calapor	Tarana	Surabhi Dashputra	Surabhi Dashputra	2013
Calapor	I Love You Ma	Arjuna Harjai & Surabhi Dashputra	Surabhi Dashputra	2013
Calapor	Bindaas	Various	Surabhi Dashputra	2013
Titoo MBA	Kyu Hua Reprise	Neeti Mohan	Kumaar	2014
Titoo MBA	O Ranjhna	Surabhi Dashputra	Surabhi Dashputra	2014
Titoo MBA	Plan Bana Le	Aishwarya Nigam & Surabhi Dashputra	Kumaar	2014
Titoo MBA	Atyachaari	Surabhi Dashputra & Arjuna Harjai	Surabhi Dashputra	2014
Titoo MBA	Kyu Hua	Arijit Singh & Arjuna Harjai	Kumaar	2014
Titoo MBA	O Soniye	Arijit Singh & Vibha Saraf	Surabhi Dashputra	2014
Chudail	Das Rahe Hain	Jonita Gandhi	Surabhi Dashputra	2015
Chudail	Raat Ye Kehti Hai	Sunidhi Chauhan	Surabhi Dashputra	2015
Hero (2015 Hindi film)	Yadaan Teriyaan Reprise	Shipra Goyal & Arjuna Harjai	Kumaar	2015
Do Lafzon Ki Kahani	Ankhiyaan	Kanika Kapoor	Kumaar	2016
P.O.W. - Bandi Yuddh Ke	Rab Ki Baatein	Arjuna Harjai	Kumaar	2016
P.O.W. - Bandi Yuddh Ke	Raahiya	Surabhi Dashputra & Shashaa Tirupati	Kumaar	2016
P.O.W. - Bandi Yuddh Ke	Dhaage	Arjuna Harjai & Nandini Srikar	Kumaar	2016
P.O.W. - Bandi Yuddh Ke	Akhari Mod Pe	Arjuna Harjai	Kumaar	2017
P.O.W. - Bandi Yuddh Ke	Ishq Hawa Hai	Arjuna Harjai	Kumaar	2017
Mahi NRI	Mera Mahi NRI	Kailash Kher	Kumaar	2017
Mahi NRI	Tere Bina	Master Saleem & Shipra Goyal	Kumaar	2017
Mahi NRI	One More Thumka	Jonita Gandhi & Anubhav Suman	Kumaar	2017
Mahi NRI	Blonde Nachdi	Hardy Sandhu & Jonita Gandhi	Kumaar	2017
Mahi NRI	Bathroom (Rap)	Hardy Sandhu	Kumaar	2017
Mahi NRI	Balle Balle	Hardy Sandhu	Kumaar	2017
Mahi NRI	Tabbar	Lehmber Hussainpuri & Hardy Sandhu	Kumaar	2017
Mahi NRI	Tere Bina (Reprise)	Hardy Sandhu	Kumaar	2017
Jindua	Takdi Ravan	Jonita Gandhi, Akhil & Arjuna Harjai	Kumaar	2017
Jindua	Laaiyan Ve	Arjuna Harjai & Surabhi Dashputra	Kumaar	2017
Lucknow Central	Teen Kabooter	Divya Kumar, Mohit Chauhan, Raftaar	Kumaar, Raftaar	2017
Lucknow Central	Rangdaari	Arijit Singh & Arjuna Harjai	Kumaar	2017
Lucknow Central	Kaavaan Kaavaan	Divya Kumar	Kumaar	2017
