= Do Lafzon Ki Kahani (film) =

2016 Hindi film directed by Deepak Tijori

- Theatrical release poster
- Directed by: Deepak Tijori
- Written by: Girish Dhamija
- Produced by: Jayantilal Gada (Presenter); Dhiraj Shetty; Avinaash V. Rai; Deepak Tijori; Dhaval Jayantilal Gada
- Starring: Randeep Hooda; Kajal Aggarwal
- Cinematography: Mohana Krishna
- Edited by: Ballu Saluja
- Music by: Songs: Arjuna Harjai; Ankit Tiwari; Amaal Mallik; Babli Haque; Score: Raju Singh
- Production companies: Pen Studios; Alumbra Entertainment; Dhiraj Motion Pictures; Focus Motion Pictures; Deepak Tijori Films
- Distributed by: Pen Studios
- Release date: 10 June 2016
- Running time: 128 minutes
- Country: India
- Language: Hindi
- Budget: ₹110 million
- Box office: ₹40 million

Do Lafzon Ki Kahani (transl. A tale of two words) is a 2016 Indian Hindi-language romantic drama film directed by Deepak Tijori and produced by Avinaash V. Rai and Dhaval Jayantilal Gada under his banner Pen India Limited. The film stars Randeep Hooda and Kajal Aggarwal in the lead roles.

The filming locations included Kuala Lumpur, Malaysia and India.

Do Lafzon Ki Kahani was released worldwide on 10 June 2016.

== Plot ==
Suraj (Randeep Hooda) is an ex-boxer who does multiple jobs to earn as much money as possible, but lives a lonely life in Malaysia. During his new job as a parking attendant, he ends up meeting Jenny (Kajal Aggarwal) a blind and cheerful girl who is surviving in the city all alone. They soon become friends and a chemistry sparks between the two. Suraj's old coach Om (Mamik Singh) calls him back to the club but Suraj tells him that he has stopped fighting. He reveals that three years ago, during a boxing match his opponent's wife begged him to lose as she needed the prize money for her daughter's treatment. In order to help, Suraj loses the fight intentionally but later discovers that it was all a plot set by the opponent boxer. After trashing him in a night club, Suraj loses his boxing license and also stops trusting or caring for anyone. He later, started working as a recovery agent but during one such recovery case, a man jumps out of his apartment window down on the road, leading to a car crash. Suraj has to serve 2 years in jail and since then has been taking care of the treatment of that man.

Back to the present, Suraj now falls in love with Jenny and wants to express his love to her, but on reaching her house finds Jenny's boss harassing her. Suraj beats him up, at which Jenny gets mad as she feared losing her job. Suraj promises to take care of her and takes her home. He proposes to Jenny and they have sex. After sex he asks about her parents. Suraj is then shocked to discover that Jenny's blindness and her parents deaths are due to the same car crash 3 years ago. Weighed down with guilt, Suraj decides to get Jenny operated but needs 300,000 rupees within a month. Suraj, who has already returned to part-time boxing asks for help from his coach.

Suraj's old rival Sikandar offers him to join an illegal fight club, where the owner Gavin (Yuri Suri) pays him 300,000 to lose a fight. Om tries to stop Suraj as this kind of fights may lead to fighter's death or permanent handicap. During the fight Sikandar provokes him and Suraj beats him up. Angered Gavin gives Suraj a last chance to pay back by delivering a bag of drugs. While Jenny is being operated in hospital, Suraj delivers the package only to be run over by Sikandar's car, leading to severe spinal injury. After getting her eyes back Jenny is disappointed upon not seeing Suraj and thinks he has abandoned her. 6 months later, Jenny is working at the same hospital as a physiotherapist, where Suraj is getting treated but doesn't recognize him. Suraj too doesn't reveal his identity to Jenny, because of his paralytic condition. On being able to walk with crutches, Suraj decides to finally confess his feelings to Jenny but seeing her with another man, assumes that she has moved on. Suraj walks away with a heavy heart and visits the place were they both used to spend time together. While searching for Suraj, Jenny reaches the same spot and they unite.

== Cast ==
- Randeep Hooda as Sooraj Singh Rathod / Sooraj Udaypratap Chauhan / Sarfaraz Ahmed
- Kajal Aggarwal as Dr. Jenny Mathias, a blind sculptor artist who is now a physiotherapist
- Dhiraj Shetty as Sikander
- Mamik Singh as Omi
- Anil George as Shrikant
- Snehal Kulshrestha as Driver
- Yuri Suri as Gavin
- Sara Khalid Gesawat as Aalia
- Flora Saini as Natasha
- Pratichi Mishra as Kalawati
- Vinay Aggarwal as Jenny's father
- Kartikeya Goud as Kabir, a fitness club owner

== Release ==
=== Critical reception ===
Renuka Vyavahare of The Times of India gave it 2 stars out of 5, describing the story crawling to its conclusion sluggishly. Ananya Bhattacharya of India Today wrote that movie can be watched once only for Randeep Hooda. Shubhra Gupta of The Indian Express gave it 1 star out of 5 describing movie as a string of drippy sequences. Hindi daily Hindustan's critic Vishal Thakur gave the film 3 stars out of 5. He called the high-note background music "disturbing" and Tijori's direction "weak". However, he lauded Hooda's performance.

Namrata Joshi of The Hindu described it as a boring love story. Udita Jhunjhunwala of Firstpost wrote that the story is full of holes and the narrative leans too often on ballads and ‘sad songs’ to establish mood. Rediff.com's Namrata Thakker called the film "predictable and boring". In her review, she wrote that "[Hooda] ha[d] given everything to the role" but the film "doesn't do justice to his acting abilities". She found the script with loopholes and editing "sloppy". Saibal Chatterjee from NDTV gave it 1.5 stars out of 5, saying that Walk into this storm only if you have the disposition to withstand the ugly gusts.

=== Box office ===
According to Box Office India, the film collected approximately ₹40 million on a budget of ₹110 million in its lifetime.

== Soundtrack ==
Do Lafzon Ki Kahani

Soundtrack album by Arjuna Harjai, Ankit Tiwari, Amaal Mallik, Babli Haque, Dr. Zeus and Meet Bros
- Released: 5 May 2016
- Genre: Feature film soundtrack
- Length: 31:22
- Label: T-Series

The soundtrack album is composed by Amaal Mallik, Babli Haque, Arjuna Harjai and Ankit Tiwari. The song "Tu Mila" was sung by pop singer Shrey Singhal was used in movie but it was not released but later on Shrey Singhal officially upload in his YouTube channel.

No.	Title	Lyrics	Music	Singer(s)	Length
1.	"Kuch Toh Hai"	Manoj Muntashir	Amaal Mallik	Armaan Malik	4:08
2.	"Jeena Marna"	Sandeep Nath	Babli Haque	Altamash Faridi	4:45
3.	"Ankhiyan"	Kumaar	Arjuna Harjai	Kanika Kapoor	4:13
4.	"Jeena Marna (Female)"	Sandeep Nath	Babli Haque	Palak Muchhal	4:45
5.	"Sehra"	Sandeep Nath	Ankit Tiwari	Ankit Tiwari	4:27
6.	"Chal Utth Bandeya"	Raj Ranjodh	Dr.Zeus	Sukhwinder Singh	4:19
7.	"Tu Mila"	Kumaar	Meet Bros	Shrey Singhal	4:45
Total length:					31:22

== Awards and nominations ==
Award	Category	Recipients and nominees	Result	Ref.
9th Mirchi Music Awards	Upcoming Lyricist of The Year	Raj Ranjodh – "Chal Utth Bandeya"	Nominated	

== See also ==
- List of films about boxing
