= Emmay Entertainment =

Indian film and television production company

- Industry: Entertainment
- Founded: 2011; 15 years ago in Mumbai, Maharashtra, India
- Founder: Nikkhil Advani; Monisha Advani; Madhu Bhojwani
- Headquarters: Mumbai, India
- Website: emmay.com

Emmay Entertainment and Motion Pictures LLP is an Indian content production company based in Mumbai, India. It was founded by Nikkhil Advani, Monisha Advani and Madhu Bhojwani in 2011. After its inception, it began with full-length feature films and gradually expanded to television, short films, telefilms and digital content.

== History ==
Emmay Entertainment was founded by Indian film director Nikkhil Advani, his sister Monisha Advani, and friend, Madhu Bhojwani. Nikkhil Advani has worked on films like Kuch Kuch Hota Hai, Kabhi Khushi Kabhie Gham and Mohabbatein. The first film he directed was Kal Ho Naa Ho, which won six Filmfare awards. After starting Emmay, he has been involved with multiple projects like D-Day, Hero, Katti Batti, Airlift.

== Films ==
The first feature film produced by Emmay Entertainment was D-Day, which was received with positive reviews along with a few awards. Another film produced by Emmay was Airlift, which was their first to cross 1 billion on the box office and also their first to receive a National Award. Apart from these two films, Emmay also produced Katti Batti and Hero; with the latter bagging a Filmfare award. Emmay Entertainment also produced the prison film Lucknow Central directed by Ranjit Tiwari It stars Farhan Akhtar as the lead actor.

Their next film was Satyameva Jayate, a vigilante action film Directed by Milap Zaveri starring John Abraham, Manoj Bajpayee, Amruta Khanvilkar and Debutante Aisha Sharma that was released on 15 August 2018. Followed by Baazaar an Indian crime thriller movie directed by Gauravv K. Chawla, and written by Nikkhil Advani, Aseem Arora and Parveez Sheikh. Starring Saif Ali Khan, debutant Rohan Vinod Mehra, Radhika Apte and Chitrangada Singh. Nikkhil Advani announced the film Batla House a 2019 action thriller film written by Ritesh Shah starring John Abraham opposite Mrunal Thakur. Inspired by the Batla House encounter case that took place in 2008, the story showcases the encounter and its aftermath. The film was released on 15 August 2019 and became commercially successful at the box office.

In 2019, the company produced Marjaavaan a romantic action film directed by Milap Zaveri and starring Sidharth Malhotra, Riteish Deshmukh, Tara Sutaria and Rakul Preet Singh. The film is a co-production with T-Series and was released on 15 November 2019 and became commercially successful at the box office.

In 2020, Emmay produced Indoo Ki Jawani, directed by Abir Sengupta starring Kiara Advani, of this role Aditya seal and Mallika Dua. It is a coming of age comedy film that revolves around a girl from Ghaziabad and her misadventures with dating apps. The film was released on 11 December 2020.

Sardar Ka Grandson (lit. 'Sardar's Grandson') is a 2021 Indian Hindi-language comedy-drama film directed by Kaashvie Nair and written by Anuja Chauhan and Kaashvi Nair. The film was produced under the banner Emmay Entertainment, T-Series and JA Entertainment. The film features Arjun Kapoor, Neena Gupta and Rakul Preet Singh in lead roles. It's a love story spanning three-generation, starting in 1946 and continuing till 2020. While John Abraham and Aditi Rao Hydari played cameo roles as Arjun Kapoor's grandparents in 1946 track. The film was released on 18 May 2021 on Netflix.

In March 2023, Emmay produced Mrs. Chatterjee vs Norway. It starred Rani Mukerji, Anirban Bhattacharya, Jim Sarbh and Neena Gupta. The film is based on the real-life story of an Indian couple whose children were taken away by Norwegian authorities in 2011. It was released in cinemas on 17 March 2023.

Dry Day is a 2023 Indian Hindi-language comedy drama film written and directed by Saurabh Shukla. It stars Jitendra Kumar, Shriya Pilgaonkar and Annu Kapoor. It is produced by Emmay Entertainment. It released directly on Amazon Prime Video, on 22 December 2023.

Vedaa is a 2024 Indian Hindi-language action drama film directed by Nikkhil Advani and written by Aseem Arora. Produced by Emmay Entertainment in collaboration with Zee Studios and JA Entertainment, the film stars John Abraham, Sharvari, and Abhishek Banerjee. Inspired by true events, the film is the journey of a young woman, who faces and resists a repressive system against portrayal of an antagonist. The film was released theatrically on 15 August 2024.

Kaalidhar Laapata (2025) tells the story of Kaalidhar, a lonely middle-aged man battling memory loss, who flees after overhearing his family’s plan to abandon him. On his journey, he meets Ballu, an orphan boy who helps him rediscover life and the joy of living for himself. Directed by Madhumita, the film is a Hindi remake of her acclaimed Tamil feature K.D. and stars Abhishek Bachchan in the lead.

== Television ==
A television film called Shaadi Vaadi And All That, an hour-long film for MTV, produced by Nikkhil Advani is a love triangle with a twist. The show is Kaashvi Nair's directorial debut who worked with Nikkhil as an assistant director.

Nikkhil Advani has directed a finite TV Series P.O.W.- Bandi Yuddh Ke for Star Plus. The show is an official adaptation of an Israeli TV series Prisoners of War. The series premiered on 7 November 2016.

== Web series ==
Hasmukh (2020)

Directed by Nikhil Gonsalves and written by Suparn Verma, Vir Das, Nikkhil Advani, Amogh Ranadive and Neeraj Pandey was released on Netflix on 17 April. Headlined by Vir Das as ‘Hasmukh’ and Ranvir Shorey as ‘Jimmy’ the show's crew also consists of Amrita Bagchi, Mantra, Ravi Kishan, Manoj Pahwa, Joanna Robaczewska, Raza Murad, among others. Emmay Entertainment as the production house, have created this show in association with Applause Entertainment.

Mumbai Diaries 26/11 (2021)

Mumbai Diaries 26/11 is an Indian Hindi-language medical thriller television series. It is set in the emergency room of a government hospital, focusing on the challenges faced by medical staff and first responders during times of crises. It was released on Amazon Prime Video on 9 September 2021. The series was created and directed by Nikkhil Advani, along with Nikhil Gonsalves. The series stars Mohit Raina, Tina Desai, Shreya Dhanwantary alongside Konkona Sen Sharma.

The Empire (2021)

The Empire is an Indian historical fiction streaming television series created by Nikkhil Advani based on Empire of the Moghul by Alex Rutherford for Disney+ Hotstar. Directed by Mitakshara Kumar, it stars Shabana Azmi, Kunal Kapoor, Dino Morea and Drashti Dhami.

Kaun Banegi Shikharwati (2022)

A series for ZEE5, Kaun Banegi Shikharwati is directed by Gauravv Chawla and Ananya Banerjee. It revolves around the life of a former king, who has a dysfunctional family, devises an outlandish plan to unite his estranged daughters. Meanwhile, an income tax investigation looms over the palace's hidden treasure.

Rocket Boys (2022 & 2023)

Rocket Boys is an Indian Hindi-language Biographical streaming television series on SonyLIV. The series is based on the lives of Homi J. Bhabha and Vikram Sarabhai. Directed by Abhay Pannu and produced under the banner of Emmay Entertainment and Roy Kapur Films respectively. The series stars Jim Sarbh and Ishwak Singh along with Regina Cassandra. The season one of the series was released on 4 February 2022 and season 2 on 16 March 2023.

Adhura (2023)

An Indian Supernatural thriller, Adhura - directed by Gauravv K. Chawla & Ananya Banerjee starring Ishwak Singh & Rasika Duggal, and many others. The Series released on 7 July 2023 on Amazon Prime Video.

Mumbai Diaries 2 (2023)

In the second season of Mumbai Diaries, Doctors and residents at BGH grapple with an unprecedented natural calamity that brings the city to a standstill, whilst also fighting their own personal battles. - directed by Nikkhil Advani starring Mohit Raina, Konkana Sen, Shreya Dhanwanthary, Natasha Bharadwaj, Satyajeet Dubey, Sonali Kulkrani, Mrunmayee, Deshpande, Tina Desai, Prakash Belawadi, Ridhi Dogra, and Parambrata Chattopadhyay. The Series released on 6 October 2023 on Amazon Prime Video.

Freedom At Midnight (2024)

Freedom at Midnight is a Hindi-language historical drama web series produced by Emmay Entertainment in collaboration with StudioNext for Sony LIV. Directed by Nikkhil Advani and based on the acclaimed book by Dominique Lapierre and Larry Collins, the series portrays the events leading up to India's independence and the Partition in 1947. The narrative delves into the political and personal dynamics of key figures such as Mahatma Gandhi, Jawaharlal Nehru, Sardar Vallabhbhai Patel, and Muhammad Ali Jinnah. The ensemble cast includes Sidhant Gupta, Chirag Vohra, Rajendra Chawla, Arif Zakaria, and Luke McGibney. The first season, comprising seven episodes, premiered on Sony LIV on 15 November 2024.

Freedom At Midnight 2 (2026)

Freedom At Midnight Season 2 is the electrifying story of India’s struggle for independence. Based on the bestselling book of the same name, it recounts the partition of India and Pakistan, and the religious and socio-political dynamics of the era. Directed by Nikkhil Advani and based on the acclaimed book by Dominique Lapierre and Larry Collins, the ensemble cast includes Sidhant Gupta, Chirag Vohra, Rajendra Chawla, Arif Zakaria, and Luke McGibney. The second season will premiere on Sony LIV on 9 January 2026.

The Revolutionaries (2026)

The Revolutionaries is an upcoming Prime Video period drama directed by Nikkhil Advani and produced by Emmay Entertainment. Based on Sanjeev Sanyal’s book Revolutionaries: The Other Story of How India Won Its Freedom, it follows young freedom fighters who championed armed resistance against British rule. Starring Bhuvan Bam, Rohit Saraf, Pratibha Ranta, Gurfateh Pirzada, and Jason Shah, the series is set to release in 2026 in India and over 240 countries and territories worldwide.

== Short films ==
Guddu Engineer (2016)

Emmay produced the short film, Guddu Engineer for the Zeal for Unity in 2016 and was directed by Nikkhil Advani.

Unpaused – Apartment (2020)

Amazon Prime Video unveiled Unpaused, an anthology of five Hindi short films filmed during the pandemic and featuring stories about new beginnings. Amongst which one such short film is Apartment directed by Nikkhil Advani, starring Richa Chadha, Sumeet Vyas, and Ishwak Singh. The plot focuses on the fall and ultimate rise of Chadha's character as she comes to terms with her husband's indiscretions with the help of a friendly neighbor.

== Films ==
Year	Title	Director	Notes	Ref
2013	D-Day	Nikkhil Advani		
2014	Shaadi Vaadi And All That	Kaashvi Nair		
2015	Hero	Nikkhil Advani		
2015	Katti Batti	Nikkhil Advani		
2016	Airlift	Raja Krishna Menon		
2016	Guddu Engineer	Nikkhil Advani	Short Film	
2017	Lucknow Central	Ranjit Tiwari		
2018	Satyameva Jayate	Milap Zaveri		
2018	Baazaar	Gauravv K Chawla		
2019	Batla House	Nikkhil Advani		
2019	Marjaavaan	Milap Zaveri		
2020	Indoo Ki Jawani	Abir Sengupta		
2020	Unpaused	Nikkhil Advani	Anthology Film; Released on Amazon Prime Video	
2021	Sardar Ka Grandson	Kaashvie Nair	Released on Netflix	
2021	Bell Bottom	Ranjit Tiwari		
2021	Satyameva Jayate 2	Milap Zaveri		
2023	Mrs. Chatterjee vs Norway	Ashima Chibber		
2023	Dry Day	Saurabh Shukla	Released on Amazon Prime Video	
2024	Vedaa	Nikkhil Advani		
2025	Kaalidhar Laapata	Madhumitha	Released on ZEE5	

== Television shows / Web Series ==
Title	Year	Director	Platform	Ref(s)
P.O.W. – Bandi Yuddh Ke	2016–2017	Nikhil Gonsalves; Kaashvi Nair; Gauravv K. Chawla; Nikkhil Advani	Star Plus	
The Mini Truck	2017	Kaashvi Nair; Nikhil Gonsalves; Karishma Kohli	YouTube	
Hasmukh	2020	Nikhil Gonsalves	Netflix	
Mumbai Diaries	2021–present	Nikhil Gonsalves; Nikkhil Advani	Amazon Prime Video	
The Empire	2021	Mitakshara Kumar	Disney+ Hotstar	
Kaun Banegi Shikharwati	2022	Gauravv K. Chawla; Ananya Banerjee	ZEE5	
Rocket Boys	2022–2023	Abhay Pannu	Sony LIV	
Adhura	2023	Ananya Banerjee; Gauravv K. Chawla	Amazon Prime Video	
Freedom At Midnight	2024 –2026	Nikkhil Advani	Sony LIV	
The Revolutionaries	2026	Nikkhil Advani	Amazon Prime Video	
