= Vibha Saraf =

Indian singer-songwriter (born 1986)

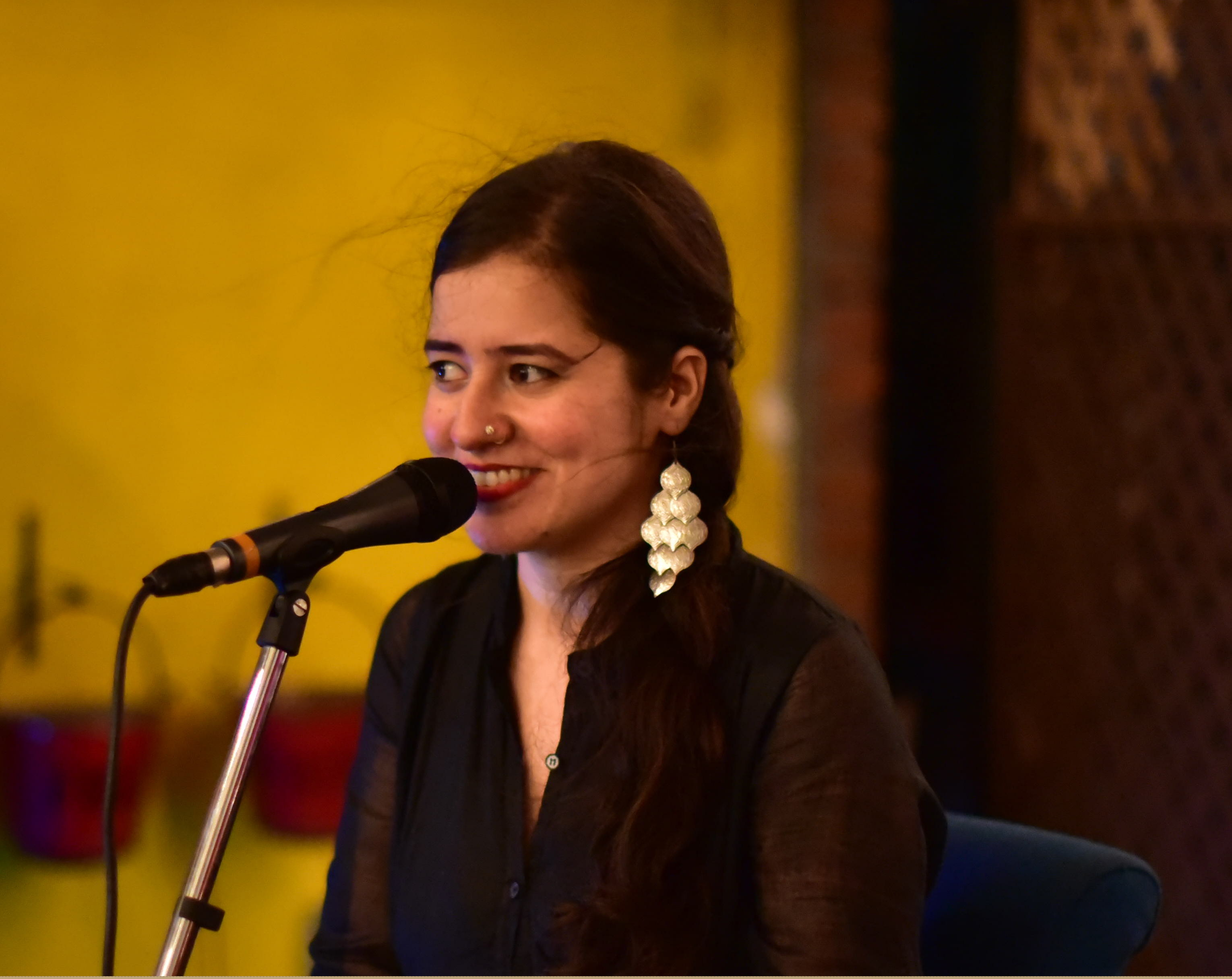
- Vibha Saraf performing in 2018

Background information
- Born: 10 May 1986 (age 39)
- Origin: Srinagar, Jammu and Kashmir, India
- Genres: Pop, Bollywood, Kashmiri
- Occupations: Musician; Singer; Composer
- Instrument: Vocals
- Years active: 2017–present

Vibha Saraf (born 10 May 1986) is an Indian singer-songwriter and Bollywood playback singer. She performs folk songs and writes and performs music for soundtracks, primarily Kashmiri folk-inspired songs. Her work has been featured on the soundtracks for the films Raazi, which went to win Best Film in the 64th Filmfare Awards, and Gully Boy, the fourth highest-grossing Bollywood film of 2019. In 2019, she was jointly nominated with Harshdeep Kaur for Best Female Playback Singer for the 65th Filmfare Awards and Best Female Playback Singer for the 20th International Indian Film Academy Awards for the song Dilbaro, from the 2018 drama thriller Raazi.

== Early life and education ==
Vibha Saraf was born in the Fateh Kadal neighbourhood of Srinagar in Jammu and Kashmir in India. During the exodus of Kashmiri Pandits from the region, her family relocated to New Delhi, India, when Saraf was three years old.

She began taking classes at Shriram Bharatiya Kala Kendra, studying Hindustani classical music for four years before studying pop music for five years. Saraf worked as a management consultant for five years before quitting to pursue music.

== Career ==
In 2013, Saraf moved to Mumbai to pursue her career in music. One year later, she had recorded her first soundtrack song, a duet with Arijit Singh titled "O Soniye" for Titoo MBA. The next year, in 2015, she sang "Feeling Avnavi," alongside Advait Nemlekar, for the soundtrack Gujjubhai the Great.

She released her debut single "Harmokh Bartal," in 2016. A bhajan from Kashmir that Saraf selected to celebrate Kashmir's culture and music, Saraf reinterpreted the song, with Tapas Relia composing it and Ashwin Srinivasan playing flute and Ankur Mukherjee, guitar.

In 2018, Saraf performed "Dilbaro" for the film Raazi. The song was written by Shankar–Ehsaan–Loy and was inspired by the Kashmiri folk wedding song "Khanmoj koor." She was nominated for an International Indian Film Academy Award for the performance in 2019.

In February 2019, Saraf released "Kab Se Kab Tak," a duet with Ranveer Singh. Saraf also co-sang the song "Dil Mein Mars Hai" alongside Benny Dayal for the Mission Mangal soundtrack, which was released in the summer of 2019. That same year, Saraf performed on the Gully Boy soundtrack in the duet "Kab Se Kab Tak" with Ranveer Singh.

Saraf has written music for Nucleya, whom she met briefly at an airport after a performance. The two exchanged music over WhatsApp and Saraf wrote lyrics. She has since written two songs for Nucleya and performed on one, the latter which was "Behka," for the film High Jack.

== Music & Discography ==
Vibha Saraf has appeared in music videos in her songs. She appears in the music video of the song 'Mumal' where she is a co-singer with a Rajasthani folk singer Dapu Khan. Vibha also appears in her own music video 'Jalwe' along with Absar Zahoor.

She has sung for Bollywood and also in other Indian languages including Kashmiri, Telugu, Bengali & Tamil. She writes lyrics for both film and non-film songs & also composes songs for both the film industry and Independent music.

=== Singer ===
Film Songs

Year	Song title	Movie	Co-singer(s)	Composer(s)	Lyricist(s)	Notes
2013	Issaq Tera (Duet)	Issaq	Mohit Chauhan, Smita Jain	Sachin-Jigar	Mayur Puri	
2014	O Soniye	Titoo MBA	Arijit Singh	Arjuna Harjai	Surabhi Dasgupta	Punjabi Hindi film
2016	Chal Chalein	Dhanak	Papon, Shivamm Pathak	Tapas Relia	Ali Mir Hussain	
2017	Jiya O Jiya	Jia Aur Jia		Sachin Gupta	Hasrat Jaipuri	
2018	Behka	High Jack	Nucleya	Nucleya, Vibha Saraf	Vibha Saraf	
2018	Dilbaro	Raazi	Harshdeep Kaur	Shankar-Ehsaan-Loy	Gulzar	
2018	24 Kisses (Theme Song)	24 Kisses		Joi Barua	Vibha Saraf	Telugu film
2018	Aksharaalu Lene Leni (Female)	24 Kisses		Joi Barua	Vibha Saraf	Telugu film
2019	Kab Se Kab Tak	Gully Boy	Ranveer Singh	Karsh Kale		
2019	Dil Mein Mars Hai	Mission Mangal	Benny Dayal	Amit Trivedi	Amitabh Bhattacharya	
2019	Bumro	Notebook	Kamaal Khan, Vishal Mishra	Vishal Mishra	Kaushal Kishore, Vibha Saraf	
2020	Gupchup	Chaman Bahaar	Solo	Anshuman Mukherjee, Anuj Garg		
2020	Rabba Maine Chand Vekhya	Dheet Patangey	Jubin Nautiyal	Vayu	Vibha Saraf	Kashmiri Language
2021	Gustakh Mausam'	Nail Polish	Ronit Chaterji	Sanjay Wanderkar		
2024	"Main Tujhe Phir Miloongi"	Article 370	Shashwat Sachdev	Shashwat Sachdev	Kumaar	

=== Songs ===
Her non film songs where Vibha has composed, sung and written lyrics.

Year	Song title	Artist(s)	Note(s)
2017	Dhoop	Nucleya ft. Vibha Saraf	Single
2019	Lori	Nucleya ft. Vibha Saraf	From the EP Tota Myna by Nucleya
2020	Chandni	Rajeev Bhalla ft. Vibha Saraf	Single

=== Other language songs ===
In addition to Hindi and Kashmiri, she has sung songs in Bangla, Telugu and Tamil.

== Musical influence ==
Saraf's music is influenced by traditional music of Kashmir, Jammu and Ladakh. Saraf cites the music she heard growing up, as sung by her grandparents and mother, as making Kashmiri music "subconsciously" in her. She wants more people to understand the sufism in the songs. She also finds inspiration in Kashmiri literature, including the poetry of Habba Khatoon and Lalleshwari.

In an interview with The Hindu in 2019, Saraf described her interest in sharing Kashmir-inspired folk music with a broader listenership as a responsibility that "falls on our generation" to "stick to our roots." In the interview, she expresses an appreciation for the preservation and popularity of Punjabi music.

== Awards ==
Vibha Saraf won the Best Female Playback Singer award for the song Dilbaro, Raazi at the 20th IIFA Awards held on 18 September 2019 in Mumbai, India.

Saraf and Harshdeep Kaur also jointly won the Best Female Playback Singer at REEL Movie Awards 2019 for Dilbaro, Raazi, as well as the Zee Cine Award for Best Playback Singer – Female for the same song.
