= P.O.W. – Bandi Yuddh Ke =

Indian political thriller television series

- First poster
- Genre: Thriller
- Based on: Prisoners of War
- Written by: Aseem Arora; Aniruddha Guha; Nikkhil Advani
- Directed by: Nikkhil Advani Gauravv K Chawla Kaashvi Nair: Nikhil Gonsalves
- Starring: Amrita Puri; Sandhya Mridul; Anurag Sinha; Purab Kohli; Satyadeep Mishra; Manish Choudhary; Parul Gulati
- Theme music composer: Arjuna Harjai
- Opening theme: Arjuna Harjai
- Country of origin: India
- Original language: Hindi Urdu Punjabi
- No. of seasons: 1
- No. of episodes: 110

Production
- Producers: Monisha Advani; Madhu G Bhojwani
- Running time: 20–29 min
- Production company: Emmay Entertainment

Original release
- Network: Star Plus
- Release: 7 November 2016 – 15 March 2017

P.O.W. – Bandi Yuddh Ke is an Indian political thriller television series developed by Nikkhil Advani, and is loosely based on the Israeli drama Prisoners of War. The series premiered 7 November 2016 on Star Plus. The show was featured at MAMI film fest followed by a talk with Gideon Raff, who developed Hatufim for Keshet and served as a consultant for this series. It went off-air after four months of its launch due to low viewership. The show now streams on MX Player, Amazon Prime Video and Lionsgate Play.

== Plot summary ==
After seventeen years in captivity, two soldiers, who seem to share a dark secret, return to their families. The two families try to pick up where they left off, while a government agent tries to expose their dark secret. Meanwhile, the POWs try to acclimatise to the environment that they left 17 years ago. The government agent tries several methods to expose these POWs but ends up in trouble.

== Cast ==
- Amrita Puri as Harleen Kaur
- Sandhya Mridul as Nazneen Khan
- Anurag Sinha as Lt. Siddhant Thakur/Sadiq
- Purab Kohli as Naib Subedar Sartaaj Singh
- Satyadeep Mishra as Squadron Leader Imaan Khan
- Manish Choudhary as Major Vikram Singh
- Rasika Dugal as Shobha Thakur
- Sujata Kumar as Squadron Leader Iman Khan's Mother (Mrs khan)
- Arun Bali as Harpal Singh
- Parul Gulati as Afreen
- Suhaas Ahuja as Salim Khan
- Ghazal Thakur as Shaira Khan
- Krishh Pathak as Ayaan Khan
- Shivani Singh as Naina
- Ravinder Bakshi as Satpal Singh
- Ragini Sharma as Veera
- Anindita Nayar as Dr. Nandini Kapoor
- Vrushabh Naik as Arjan
- Denzil Smith as Lala / Rashid Jamal
- Sahil Salathia as Yusuf
- Sameksha as Indira Jaisingh
- Pramod Pathak
- Abhishek Gupta as Santosh
- Kanisha Malhotra as Ananya
- Abhijeet Sooryvanshe

== Production ==
=== Development ===
Star Plus approached Nikkhil Advani after watching his latest film D-Day, to direct a show based on the similar plotline on their channel. Star Plus had him watch both Prisoners of War and its American counterpart Homeland. Advani sought to make a show like Hatufim since he thought a show like Homeland would not suite Indian's sensibilities.

The budget of the series was ₹35 crores, and was shot in 90 locations along with about 150 crew members and with a budget of ₹27 Lakh per episode. The series was planned as a finite one for 126 episodes. However, due to very less viewership, it ended with 110 episodes.

=== Casting ===
Advani decided to rope in Amrita Puri, Purab Kohli, Satyadeep Misra, Manish Chaudhary and Sandhya Mridul – the former debuting on the small screen and the latter returning on the small screen after a hiatus of two years. Anurag Sinha makes a major entry post Episode 60 along with Parul Gulati and Sahil Salathia in the series as the further story unveils. Theater actor Abhishek Gupta plays RAW officer Santosh and Lala (Rashid Jamaal) is played by Denzil Smith in the series.

=== Music ===
Arjuna Harjai made his television debut with this show. He composed all the music tracks, background score, soundtrack, and also sung some songs except the title track. The music received critical acclaim and won both Abby Gold and Bronze awards in the Best Original Score & Soundtrack category for the StarPlus network.

== Critical reception ==
Gursimran Kaur Bangal of The Times of India said "The show has managed to hold us all through the three episodes aired so far. The narrative is gripping and stirs you emotionally. It keeps you glued to what will happen next. This one is not to be missed!" Anvita Singh of India Today praised the show's unique plot, strong female characters, actors and the good cliffhanger. Mid-Day has compared the show with its American counterpart and considered that while it aids in etching the underlying theme of the series, the treatment given to the two adaptations are significantly distanced from one another. The Quint stated that the reunion scene of two prisoners could have been shown separately instead of showing both simultaneously in a single frame. It reviewed, "The new mega show of Star Plus, P.O.W.- Bandi Yuddh Ke lies somewhere between the ambition of cinema to be restrained and the dimness of television to be understood. It chugs along well with occasional attempts of expansive frames, overhead shots, and an enlightened understanding of relationships till the key scene - which quite honestly, disappoints."

The show also won several awards including Jury award for best Asian show at Seoul International drama awards and for its promotion and music at the Abby. It also had 12 nominations at the ITA awards, winning in categories such as: Best Drama-Jury, Best Actor-Jury (Purab Kohli), Best Actor in a Negative Role (Denzil Smith).
