= Calapor (film) =

- Directed by: Dinesh P. Bhonsle
- Written by: R. Mihir Vardhan
- Produced by: A. Durga Prasad
- Starring: Priyanshu Chatterjee; Hemant Gopal; Rituparna Sengupta; Raghubir Yadav; Harsh Chhaya; P. Subbaraju; Aziz Naser; Binny Sharma; Aakash Sharma; Anjan Srivastav; Minaxi Martins; Vinod Anand
- Cinematography: Mahesh Aney
- Edited by: Virendra Hari Gharse
- Music by: Arjuna Harjai
- Release date: 2 August 2013
- Country: India
- Language: Hindi

Calapor is a 2013 Bollywood thriller film produced by A. Durga Prasad and directed by Dinesh P. Bhonsle. The film is a taut thriller, set against the backdrop of a jail. It is a modern story of reformation. The film provokes thoughts about the nature of human beings while infusing hope that there is good in every human being. The film is slated for 2 August 2013 release.

== Plot ==
A reluctant Jyotsna, an artist, and her assistant Ragini arrive at Calapor Central Jail to conduct an art program for prison inmates. It was initiated by a very sincere and committed reformist Jail Superintendent, Karunakar. The agonizing past of a criminal husband who cheated her and a delinquent son who ran away returns to torment her. With adversity comes an opportunity—a second chance that Jyotsna, as a mother, cannot afford to lose or fail to succeed.

== Cast ==
- Priyanshu Chatterjee as Chiti Pandhar
- Rituparna Sengupta
- Raghubir Yadav
- Harsh Chhaya
- Subbaraju
- Aziz Naser
- Binny Sharma
- Aakash Sharma
- Hemant Gopal
- Anjan Srivastav
- Vinod Anand
- Minaxi Martins
- Kumar Shivam
- Ghanshyam Srivastava
