= Nikkhil Advani =

Indian filmmaker

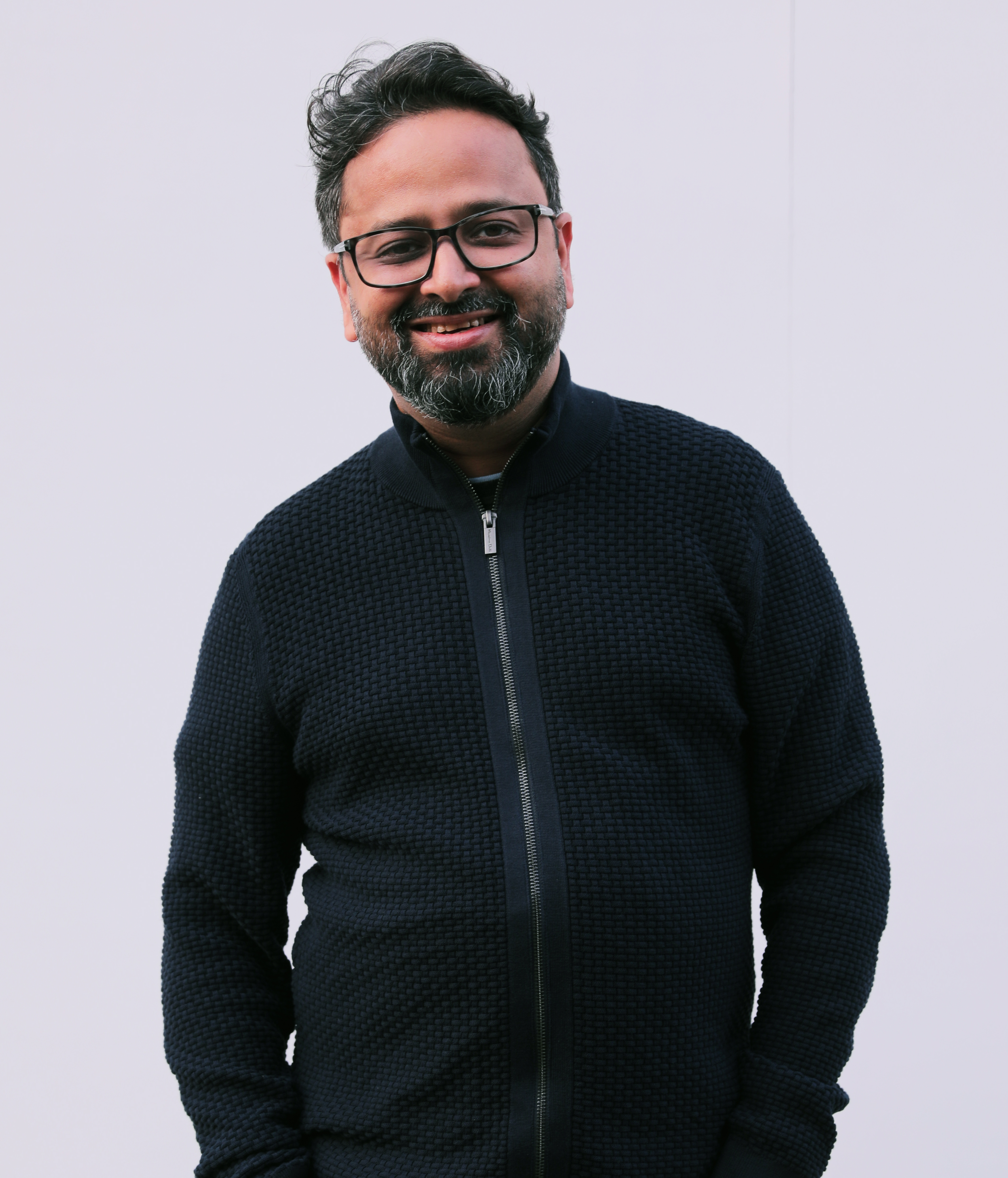
- Nikkhil in 2020
- Born: Nikhil Suresh Advani; 28 April 1971 (age 55); Bombay, Maharashtra, India
- Occupations: Director; producer; screenwriter
- Years active: 1996–present
- Spouse: Suparna Gupta
- Children: 1

Nikkhil Advani (born Nikhil Suresh Advani, 28 April 1971) is an Indian director, producer and screenwriter who works in Hindi cinema. He along with his sister, Monisha Advani and Madhu Bhojwani, co-founded the entertainment company Emmay Entertainment.

== Early life and family ==
Advani was born and raised in Bombay, Maharashtra, India, into a Sindhi Hindu family. His father is a retired professional who worked in senior management positions with multinationals in the chemical and pharmaceuticals industry and his mother is an advertising professional. His father is Sindhi whilst his mother is Maharashtrian.

He studied at Green Lawns High School, Breach Candy, and later did his Masters in chemistry at St. Xavier's College, Mumbai. He married his college friend Suparna Gupta with whom he has a daughter Keya. Advani is the grand nephew of late producer N. N. Sippy and second cousin of actor Tusshar Kapoor and producer Ekta Kapoor.

== Film career ==
Advani started his career by assisting Saeed and Aziz Mirza in directing Naya Nukkad (1994), and his very first outing as a co-screenwriter for Iss Raat Ki Subah Nahin (1996) was critically appreciated. Then, he was an assistant director and assisted Karan Johar in his first two directorial projects, Kuch Kuch Hota Hai (1998) and Kabhi Khushi Kabhi Gham (2001). Advani also had an acting guest appearance in Kuch Kuch Hota Hai, along with Farah Khan during the sequence of "The Neelam Show". Similarly, he assisted Aditya Chopra on Mohabbatein (2000).

Advani made his directorial debut with the critically acclaimed film Kal Ho Naa Ho (2003), a romantic comedy-drama film starring Jaya Bachchan, Shah Rukh Khan, Saif Ali Khan, and Preity Zinta, with Sushma Seth, Reema Lagoo, Lillete Dubey, and Delnaaz Paul in supporting roles. Originally supposed to be helmed by Johar, who had written the script but instead handed the reins to Advani, The film received positive critical feedback and was commercially successful, and was the highest-grossing Indian film of the year. It explores several themes, such as the depiction of non-resident Indians, inter-caste marriage, terminal illness, and homosexuality through innuendo and homosocial bonding. It won two National Film Awards, eight Filmfare Awards, thirteen International Indian Film Academy Awards, six Producers Guild Film Awards, three Screen Awards, and two Zee Cine Awards in 2004.

Advani then directed and co-wrote Salaam-e-Ishq (2007), an anthology romantic drama featuring an ensemble cast of Salman Khan, Priyanka Chopra, Anil Kapoor, Juhi Chawla, Akshaye Khanna, Ayesha Takia, John Abraham, Vidya Balan, Govinda, Shannon Esra, Sohail Khan and Isha Koppikar in lead roles. An unofficial remake of the Hollywood film Love Actually (2003), the film weaves 6 love stories together through the relationships of the people within each.

He next directed Chandni Chowk to China, an action comedy film starring Akshay Kumar and Deepika Padukone in the lead roles, marking Kumar's first collaboration with both Padukone and Advani, while Mithun Chakraborty, Ranvir Shorey and Hong Kong action cinema star Gordon Liu featured in supporting roles. The film revolves around a vegetable cutter from Chandni Chowk in Delhi who finds himself on an adventure in China after the residents of an oppressed village deem him to be the reincarnation of a slain Chinese revolutionary. The film was distributed in the U.S. and co-produced by Warner Bros. Being Warner Bros. Pictures' first Hindi film, it was the third highest-grossing film of the year at the Indian Box Office.

Following this, Advani produced Jaane Kahan Se Aayi Hai (2010), a Bollywood science fiction romance film written and directed by Milap Zaveri. It stars Riteish Deshmukh, Jacqueline Fernandez, Sonal Sehgal, and Ruslaan Mumtaz in lead roles. Later, he wrote and directed Patiala House in 2011, starring Rishi Kapoor, Dimple Kapadia, Akshay Kumar and Anushka Sharma in the title roles. The children's film Delhi Safari (2012), his next venture, was India's first 3D Stereoscopic animation feature advocating for wildlife conservation.

Advani then partnered with his sister, Monisha Advani, and Madhu Bhojwani to establish Emmay Entertainment, a motion picture production company. The company's first project was Advani's own D-Day (2013), which received critical acclaim and modest commercial success. He next directed two films in 2015, both produced under Emmay : Katti Batti, a romantic comedy-drama film starring Imran Khan and Kangana Ranaut in the lead roles, marked his final association with frequent collaborators Shankar–Ehsaan–Loy; Hero, a remake of Subhash Ghai's 1983 blockbuster film of the same name, adapted by Umesh Bist, starred debutantes Sooraj Pancholi and Athiya Shetty, and was produced by Salman Khan.

Following a four-year break, Advani returned to direction with Batla House (2019), an action thriller film written by Ritesh Shah. Inspired by the Batla House encounter case, it starred his new frequent collaborator John Abraham as ACP Sanjay Kumar, based on DCP Sanjeev Kumar Yadav, who played a crucial role in the encounter. The story showcases the encounter and in its aftermath, Sanjeev's struggle to catch the fugitives and prove the encounter's authenticity while dealing with nationwide hatred and post traumatic stress disorder. Released theatrically in India on 15 August 2019 during the Independence Day weekend, it became commercially successful at the box office.

In addition to his directorial work, he has produced several films by other directors under the Emmay banner. These include Airlift (2016), Lucknow Central (2017), Satyameva Jayate (2018), Baazaar (2018), Marjaavaan (2019), Indoo Ki Jawani (2020), Bell Bottom (2021), Satyameva Jayate 2 (2021) and more.

== Other ventures ==
=== Web series ===
In 2020, Advani produced and co-wrote his first web series, Hasmukh, for Netflix. It was directed by Nikhil Gonsalves and written by Suparn Verma, Vir Das, Nikkhil Advani, Amogh Ranadive, and Neeraj Pandey. Headlined by Vir Das as 'Hasmukh' and Ranvir Shorey as 'Jimmy' the show also consisted of Amrita Bagchi, Mantra, Ravi Kishan, Manoj Pahwa, Joanna Robaczewska, Raza Murad, among others. Adavni's Emmay Entertainment created the show in association with Applause Entertainment.

On 26 November 2020, Advani announced his second web series, Mumbai Diaries 26/11, based on 26/11, for Amazon Prime Video. It was directed by both Nikkhil Advani and Nikhil Gonsalves and starred a huge cast of Mohit Raina, Tina Desai, Konkona Sen Sharma, Shreya Dhanwanthary, Prakash Belawadi, Mishal Raheja, Satyajeet Dubey, Natasha Bharadwaj, and Mrunmayee Deshpande amongst others. It released on 9 September 2021 to critical acclaim and became the most-watched web series on Prime Video.

=== Short films ===
Emmay produced the short film, Guddu Engineer (2016) for the Zeal for Unity in 2016. Targeted at Indo-Pak unity, it was based on Rumi's poem, "Your task is not to seek for love, but merely to seek and find all the barriers within yourself that you have built against it". Directed by Advani, Guddu Engineer it won awards at the 5th Mumbai Shorts International Film Festival.

Amazon Prime Video unveiled Unpaused – Apartment (2020), an anthology of five Hindi short films filmed during the pandemic and featuring stories about new beginnings. Amongst which one such short film is Apartment directed by Advani, starring Richa Chadha, Sumeet Vyas, and Ishwak Singh. The plot focuses on the fall and ultimate rise of Chadha's character as she comes to terms with her husband's indiscretions with the help of a friendly neighbor.

=== Television ===
A TV Film called Shaadi Vaadi And All That, an hour-long film for MTV, produced by Advani is a love triangle with a twist. The show is Kaashvi Nair's directorial debut who worked with Advani as an assistant director.

Advani has directed a finite TV Series P.O.W.- Bandi Yuddh Ke for Star Plus. The show is an official adaption of an Israeli TV series Prisoners of War. The series premiered on 7 November 2016. Several Bollywood celebrities have praised the trailer. The show was premiered at the MAMI film fest followed by a talk with Gideon Raff.

== Non-film work ==
In his spare time, Advani enjoys working with Bittu Sahgal and is a member of the Board of Sanctuary Nature Foundation, which advocates climate change, biodiversity, nature conservation and save the tiger's cause. He is also actively involved in the restoration of Classic Films working along with Shiven Dungarpur and the Film Heritage Foundation. He also collaborates with Srila Chaterjee and Mahesh Mathai, curating the art house cinema for Baro Film Night. An avid Soccer fan, he works with Sarah White, Head of Partnership Marketing – APAC, City Football Marketing, to advocate and promote Manchester City Football Club in Mumbai.

== Filmography ==
=== Films ===
Year	Title	Functioned as			Notes
Year	Title	Director	Writer	Producer	Notes
1996	Is Raat Ki Subah Nahin	No	Yes	No	
1998	Kuch Kuch Hota Hai	Associate	No	No	
2000	Mohabbatein	Associate	No	No	
2001	Kabhi Khushi Kabhie Gham	Associate	No	No	
2003	Kal Ho Naa Ho	Yes	No	No	
2007	Salaam-e-Ishq	Yes	Yes	No	co-wrote with Saurabh Shukla, Suresh Nair, Rahul Awate
2009	Chandni Chowk to China	Yes	No	No	
2010	Jaane Kahan Se Aayi Hai	No	No	Yes	
2011	Patiala House	Yes	Yes	No	
2012	Delhi Safari	Yes	Yes	No	
2013	D-Day	Yes	Yes	No	
2014	Shaadi Vaadi & All That	No	No	Yes	Television film
2015	Hero	Yes	Yes	No	
2015	Katti Batti	Yes	Yes	No	
2016	Airlift	No	No	Yes	
2016	Guddu Engiineer	Yes	No	No	Short film
2017	Lucknow Central	No	No	Yes	
2018	Satyameva Jayate	No	No	Yes	
2018	Baazaar	No	No	Yes	
2019	Batla House	Yes	No	No	
2019	Marjaavaan	No	No	Yes	
2020	Indoo Ki Jawani	No	No	Yes	
2020	Unpaused	Yes	No	No	Segment: "Apartment"
2021	Sardar Ka Grandson	No	No	Yes	
2021	Satyameva Jayate 2	No	No	Yes	
2021	Bell Bottom	No	No	Yes	
2023	Mrs Chatterjee Vs Norway	No	No	Yes	
2023	Stolen	No	No	Executive	
2023	Dry Day	No	No	Yes	
2024	Vedaa	Yes	No	No	
2025	Kaalidhar Laapata	No	No	Yes	

=== Television ===
Year	Title	Functioned as				Notes
Year	Title	Creator	Director	Writer	Producer	Notes
2016–2017	P.O.W. - Bandi Yuddh Ke	Yes	Yes	Yes	No	
2017	The Mini Truck	No	No	No	Yes	Reality show
2020	Hasmukh	Yes	No	No	Yes	
2021–2023	Mumbai Diaries	Yes	Yes	Yes	No	Co-directed with Nikhil Gonsalves
2021	The Empire	Yes	No	No	No	
2022	Kaun Banegi Shikharwati	No	No	No	Yes	
2022–2023	Rocket Boys	Yes	No	No	No	
2023	Adhura	No	No	No	Yes	
2024–2026	Freedom at Midnight	Yes	Yes	No	No	
2026	The Revolutionaries	Yes	Yes	No	Yes	

=== Other credits ===
==== Assistant director ====
- Is Raat Ki Subah Nahin (1996)
- Kuch Kuch Hota Hai (1998)
- Mohabbatein (2000)
- Kabhi Khushi Kabhi Gham (2001)

==== Actor ====
Year	Title	Role	Notes
1998	Kuch Kuch Hota Hai	Guest on The Neelam Show	Uncredited cameo
