= Titoo MBA =

2014 film directed by Amit Vats

- First Look Poster
- Directed by: Amit Vats
- Written by: Puja Ballutia; Amit Vats
- Produced by: Rajan Batra; Mayank Patel
- Starring: Nishant Dahiya; Pragya Jaiswal; Abhishek Kumar
- Cinematography: Karan B. Rawat
- Edited by: Abhijit Kokate; Sunil Wadhwani
- Music by: Arjuna Harjai
- Production company: Beatrix Entertainment
- Release date: 21 November 2014
- Running time: 107 minutes
- Country: India
- Language: Hindi

Titoo MBA is an Indian Hindi-language film directed by Amit Vats and produced by Rajan Batra and Mayank Patel in association with Beatrix Entertainment. The film stars Nishant Dahiya and Pragya Jaiswal. The film was released on 21 November 2014.

== Synopsis ==
Titoo (Takhat Singh Gill) is an average Chandigarh boy with big dreams of becoming a businessman. But as usual, destiny has other plans, and nothing works out for Titoo. Added to that, his heavy debts force him to take up an unexpected and somewhat taboo career. In the midst of this financial mess, Titoo marries Gulshan Kaur Grover from Jalandhar, in an elaborately arranged marriage. He leads a double life for a while and tries his best to hide his embarrassing secret from his newlywedded wife. But as fate would have it, she finds out about Titoo's alternate career, and his life flips upside down once again.

== Cast ==
- Nishant Dahiya as Titoo
- Pragya Jaiswal as Gulshan
- Amit Mehra as Honey Singh
- Abhishek Kumar
- Satwant Kaur
- Pooja Balutia
- Nandini Singh
- Kishore Sharma as old man on house roof
- Anchal Singh
- Karan Sandhawalia

== Soundtrack ==
The soundtrack was composed by Arjuna Harjai except for "Saiyaan Bedardi", which was composed by Leonard Victor. The first single, titled "O Soniye", sung by Arijit Singh and Vibha Saraf released on 13 October 2014. The lyrics were penned by Surabhi Dashputra. The second single titled "Plan Bana Le", sung by Aishwarya Nigam and Surabhi Dashputra released on 30 October 2014. Lyrics for the song were penned by Kumaar. The third single titled "Kya Hua" sung by Arijit Singh was released on 5 November 2014. Full album was released on 11 November 2014.

Track listing
No.	Title	Lyrics	Singer(s)	Length
1.	"O Soniye"	Surabhi Dashputra	Arijit Singh, Vibha Saraf	04:16
2.	"Plan Bana Le"	Kumaar	Aishwarya Nigam and Surabhi Dashputra	04:16
3.	"Kya Hua"	Kumaar	Arijit Singh	04:39
4.	"Atyachaari"	Surabhi Dashputra	Surabhi Dashputra, Arjuna Harjai	03:23
5.	"O Ranjhna"	Surabhi Dashputra	Surabhi Dashputra	03:13
6.	"Kyu Hua Khafa"	Kumaar	Neeti Mohan	02:48
7.	"Saiyaan Bedardi (composed by Leonard Victor)"	Nitin Raikwar	Priyanka Agarwal, Abhishek Kumar	03:48
