= Judgementall Hai Kya =

2019 Indian film by Prakash Kovelamudi

- Theatrical release poster
- Directed by: Prakash Kovelamudi
- Screenplay by: Kanika Dhillon
- Produced by: Ekta Kapoor; Shobha Kapoor; Shailesh R Singh
- Starring: Kangana Ranaut; Rajkummar Rao
- Cinematography: Pankaj Kumar
- Edited by: Shweta Venkat Matthew; Sheeba Sehgal; Prashanth Ramachandran
- Music by: Songs: Arjuna Harjai; Rachita Arora; Tanishk Bagchi; Daniel B. George; Score: Daniel B. George
- Production companies: Balaji Motion Pictures; Karma Media and Entertainment; ALT Entertainment
- Distributed by: Pen Marudhar Cine Entertainment
- Release date: 26 July 2019
- Running time: 116 minutes
- Country: India
- Language: Hindi
- Budget: ₹29–50 crore
- Box office: est. ₹44.92 crore

Judgementall Hai Kya (transl. Are you judgmental?) is a 2019 Indian Hindi-language black comedy film directed by Prakash Kovelamudi, with screenplay by Kanika Dhillon starring Kangana Ranaut and Rajkummar Rao, produced by Ekta Kapoor, the film was theatrically released in India on 26 July 2019. The movie received positive reviews for the performances (especially Ranaut's and Rao's), story, direction, dialogues, production values, and cinematography.

== Plot ==
Bobby is a strange, wealthy young woman living alone in Mumbai and working as a dubbing artist. In childhood, she had intervened in a fight between her parents, causing them to fall from the terrace to their deaths. When a producer touches her at work, she reacts by slicing his nose with a knife. She is then sent to an asylum. Her uncle manages her property and offers her house for rent to a young married couple. Keshav is married to Reema. Bobby becomes obsessed with the couple and constantly spies on and stalks them. Reema dies in a kitchen fire when a bottle of pesticide explodes. Bobby suspects Keshav and tries to persuade the police to investigate him, but they find no evidence. She hallucinates Keshav threatening her and hits him with a chair in front of the police. She is returned to the asylum. It is revealed that she has been imagining things; during electric shock treatment, she remembers that she threw the pesticide on Reema because she hallucinated a cockroach on her.

Two years later, Bobby is taking her medication but does not leave her house. Her cousin in London arranges for Bobby to become an understudy in a reimagining of the Ramayana, which she is helping to design. When Bobby meets her cousin's new husband, he turns out to be Keshav. Keshav warns his wife that Bobby is unstable, but she does not believe him. Bobby begins to lose herself in the character of Sita, whom she is understudying. She believes Keshav is Raavan and that it is up to her to defeat him. Keshav panics and contacts her former boyfriend, Varun, who confirms that she becomes obsessive and had imagined him to be a criminal. He breaks into her house and finds boxes of photographs with Bobby photoshopped into them in place of Keshav's wife. A photograph of Keshav's wedding to her cousin proves that Bobby had known beforehand that they were married.

Keshav confronts Bobby. The following morning, he tells his wife that Bobby tried to kiss him, while Bobby tells her cousin that Keshav tried to rape her. Later, when she sees Keshav backstage, she grabs an axe and chases him, cutting a rope that causes a stage light to fall. Afraid that she has hurt someone, she goes on the run and gains three hallucinatory friends. They take her to a library, where she researches Keshav and believes she has found evidence that he is a serial killer who assumes new identities and murders his wives. She returns to the house dressed as Sita, ties up her pregnant cousin and, when Keshav arrives, threatens him. Keshav tries to reason with her before revealing that he is indeed a serial killer. He admits that he killed his first wife by throwing a match at her after Bobby had covered her in pesticide. Bobby fights him, and she and her cousin are both saved when Keshav is burned alive in the same manner as his victims. At the end, Bobby strides through the streets of London surrounded by her hallucinations, proudly declaring that she is who she is and will not change.

== Cast ==
- Rajkummar Rao as Keshav Kumar
- Kangana Ranaut as Bobby Batliwala Garewal
- Jimmy Shergill as Shridhar Awasthi
- Amyra Dastur as Reema Kumar (née Agnihotri)
- Amrita Puri as Megha Kumar
- Kanika Dhillon as Sita
- Brijendra Kala as Officer Ram Pandey
- Satish Kaushik as Officer Durjan Deshmukh
- Lalit Behl as Uncle
- Hussain Dalal as Varun Bahl

== Production ==
=== Filming ===
Principal photography of the film began on 16 May 2018, in Mumbai. After completing the shooting in Mumbai, the production team went to London for next schedule. The film wrapped on 9 July 2018 in London.

== Soundtrack ==
Judgementall Hai Kya

Soundtrack album by Arjuna Harjai, Rachita Arora, Tanishk Bagchi and Daniel B. George
- Released: 20 July 2019
- Recorded: 2018–2019
- Genre: Feature film soundtrack
- Length: 14:44
- Language: Hindi
- Label: Zee Music Company
External audio
- Official Audio Jukebox on YouTube

The music of the film is composed by Arjuna Harjai, Rachita Arora, Tanishk Bagchi and Daniel B. George while lyrics are written by Prakhar Varunendra, Kumaar, Tanishk Bagchi, Raja Kumari and Prakahar Vihaan. Background music scored by Daniel B George.

Track listing
| No. | Title | Lyrics | Music | Singer(s) | Length |
|---|---|---|---|---|---|
| 1. | "The Wakhra Swag" | Tanishk Bagchi, Raja Kumari | Tanishk Bagchi | Navv Inder, Lisa Mishra; Rap: Raja Kumari | 3:16 |
| 2. | "Para Para" | Prakhar Varunendra | Rachita Arora | Arun Dev Yadav | 3:51 |
| 3. | "Judgementall Hai Kya" | Prakhar Varunendra | Rachita Arora | Jaspreet Jasz, Rachita Arora, Nivedita Padmanabhan | 2:46 |
| 4. | "Kis Raste Hai Jana" | Kumaar | Arjuna Harjai | Surabhi Dashputra, Arjuna Harjai | 3:31 |
| 5. | "Kar Samna" | Prakhar Vihaan | Daniel B. George | Amir Khan, Brijesh Shandilya, Protijyoti Ghosh, Daniel B. George | 1:20 |
| Total length: | | | | | 14:44 |

== Marketing and release ==
On 4 March 2018, producer Ekta Kapoor revealed the first two posters of the film on Twitter, each depicting the two leads - a cross-eyed Ranaut and Rao holding up his middle fingers to his eyes; Kapoor hinted at the theme of mental instability by captioning, "It's time to bring out the crazy in you... Because Sanity is overrated!" In an interview, writer Kanika Dhillon called the film a "quirky thriller"

On 5 March, Balaji Motion Pictures released two more first look posters, depicting both lead characters at crime scenes. The following day, 6 March, another two posters for the film were released, with leads Kangana Ranaut and Rajkummar Rao posing in "quirky" and dangerous positions- a knife-wielding Ranaut in a water-filled bathtub surrounded by electronic gadgets at its edge, and Rao holding a butcher knife and cutting an apple, with blood seeping from his hand.

On 11 October 2018, the producers released a new poster, a composite of the original two posters of a cross-eyed Ranaut and Rao holding up his middle fingers, to reveal the film's release date. Release date of the film is changed to 21 June 2019. Rao announced the new date on his Twitter account along with new poster of the film. The release date was further extended to 26 July 2019 on 7 May 2019 by Balaji Motion Pictures.

The film promotions were also wrapped in controversy as the lead actress, Kangana Ranaut, apparently questioned a journalist for his personal remarks about her and also Rani of Jhansi. The incident took an uglier turn as the Entertainment Journalists' Guild of India decided to boycott Kangana Ranaut until she issued an unconditional apology. The producer of the film Ekta Kapoor issued an unconditional apology on behalf of her.

In June 2019, the film's title was changed to Judgementall Hai Kya due to objections from Indian Psychiatric Society (IPS) which filed a complaint to the Central Board of Film Certification (CBFC) claiming that the original title, Mental Hai Kya, trivialises mental health issues.

The film has been certified with a runtime of 116 minutes by British Board of Film Classification and was released on 26 July 2019.

== Reception ==
=== Critical response ===
Upon release, Judgementall Hai Kya received highly positive reviews from film critics, who praised the performances of Ranaut and Rao. On the Indian film review aggregator website The Review Monk, the film received an average score of 6.5/10 based on 28 reviews and 86% critics being in the favour. On review aggregator website Rotten Tomatoes, the film holds a rating of 67% based on 15 reviews, with an average rating of 6.6/10.

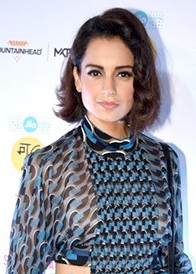
Kangana Ranaut's performance was widely acclaimed by the critics.

Stutee Ghosh of The Quint gave 4/5 stars states "The movie is a deliciously addictive ride, showing the world through the eyes of someone who feels like a misfit", praising lead performances by saying “Kangana and Rajkummar Rao are right up there giving us a rare understanding of their characters emotional and physical state. They ensure you don’t take your eyes off the screen for even a moment “. Raja Sen of Hindustan Times gave 4/5 stars and felt that the slick, snappy looking comedy has more to offer, as a 'smart, significant satire'. Praising the performances he said, "This is a finely acted film, with superb performances from Amrita Puri, Satish Kaushik and Jimmy Sheirgill, not to mention Rao, but it rests entirely on Ranaut’s shoulders and she delivers both vitality and credibility." Concluding he recommended to watch the film as 'carrying homilies on placards' and opined, "It is a film about malicious misdirection, and the validity of our narratives — especially those labelled incorrect. It’s okay to jump at a cockroach even if you’re the only one who sees it. A bug can be a feature." Vickey Lalwani of SpotboyE gave the film 4/5 stars stating "How can two actors complement each other so well! They almost take alternate turns to look crazy, vulnerable, innocent and menacing in their respective scenes, which in turns keeps you at the edge of your seat", lauding kangana's performance by saying "This is clearly Kangana Ranaut's best performance till date. Her body language is insanely amazing- the way she walks in several scenes constantly looking behind her shoulder. Her dialogue delivery is flawless- she out-pours just what her character requires. You can make out there's so much of improvisation which she has done beyond what the director demanded".

Sreeparna Sengupta of The Times of India gave the film 3.5/5 stars, found Kovelamudi's narrative style as 'quirky and edgy'. Praising performance of Ranaut, she termed it as "brilliant", as for Rao she felt that he fitted into 'his slightly macho, edgy persona like a glove'. Concluding she opines, "Judgementall Hai Kya keeps the element of suspense alive all the way till the end, as it pushes the envelope as a dark, psychological whodunit, with a social message weaved in that can’t be ignored." Charu Thakur of India Today gave 3.5/5 stars, praises director kovelamudi by stating "Prakash Kovelamudi deserves applause for pushing the envelope with a quirky thriller that goes beyond the basic realms of a whodunnit, and makes people think and absorb. It treads into a zone Bollywood rarely ventures into", praising the lead actors saying "Kangana is a firecracker in Judgementall Hai Kya. She plays the character to perfection, getting the nuances and quirks right. She brings in a certain childlike vulnerability to Bobby and that's what makes her stand out. Rajkummar holds his ground as an edgy and macho Keshav, and delivers one of his best performances". Koimoi gave 3.5/5 stars stated "All said and done, this isn’t a normal movie. From its treatment to the narrative, everything screams madness. On a brighter side, the story is strong enough to back the wacky side of it. Kangana Ranaut is definitely the queen, but this deck of cards have multiple aces to offer".

Gaurang Chauhan of Times Now rating the film with 3/5 stars terms it as 'one of its kind film', praising the performances of lead actors Ranaut and Rao and the supporting cast he wrote, "This movie belongs to Ranaut and she simply nails it." In conclusion, he opines, "Do give this one a try for its uniqueness, eccentricity, jaw-dropping moments, technical brilliance and Kangana Ranaut and Rajkummar Rao's phenomenal performances. Watch it." Shubhra Gupta of The Indian Express gave 3/5 stars and stated "This is the kind of movie which will sharply divide audiences. And that’s as it should be. Once I began seeing it as the murmurings of a different mind, I bought it as a caper, as burlesque, where nothing is as it is. I had problems with some of it, but I really liked the rest of it", praising lead performances saying "Rao plays his part with brio, and Ranaut hits all the notes perfectly". Saibal Chatterjee of NDTV gave 3/5 stars stated “Kangana is a livewire. There are moments in the film where she appears to be striving too hard to make an impression. But when she is more reined-in, she is in total control. Rajkummar Rao is the exact opposite: baring himself little by little with exceptional control. He is the ideal foil for the out-on-a-limb Kangana. Together, they command total absorption. And that helps the film tide over its less convincing bits and add up in the end to a strong, meaningful statement on the mental distress engendered by abusive relationships”.

Rajeev Masand of CNN-IBN stated, "While you admire the attempt at originality, you can’t help feeling frustrated at just how it all comes apart in the end." He praised the performances, and termed Ranaut as solid. But, he felt that the film fell short of greatness because of a muddled script and gave 2.5/5 stars.Anna M. M. Vetticad of Firstpost gave the film 2.5/5 stars, found the plot to be confusing and stated that the makers have done very poor research on mental health. The movie, at certain points, makes fun of issues that require serious attention. Psychological disorders are a concern and such toxic take can only push people back. The performances are great, especially that of Rajkumar Rao, who unfortunately is caught in between a poor script. Kangana's performance is also decent but she could have done better.

Publications like The Indian Express The Times of India named kangana ranaut's performance in judgementall hai kya as one of the best performances by female actresses in 2019. Rahul Desai of Film Companion named kangana's performance as one of his favourite Hindi film performances of 2019

=== Box office ===
According to the Bollywood Hungama opening day collection of the film is ₹4.20 crore and the second day collection is ₹7 crore, whereas third day collection is ₹7.70 crore. The opening weekend gross is ₹26.97 crore worldwide.

As of 16 August 2019, with a gross of ₹39.42 crore in India and ₹5.50 crore overseas, the film has a worldwide gross collection of ₹44.92 crore.

== Awards and nominations ==
| Year | Award | Category | Nominee(s) | Result | Ref |
|---|---|---|---|---|---|
| 2020 | Filmfare Awards | Best Actor (Critics) | Rajkummar Rao | Nominated | |
| 2020 | Filmfare Awards | Best Actress (Critics) | Kangana Ranaut | Nominated | |
| 2020 | Filmfare Awards | Best Production Design | Ravi Shrivastav | Nominated | |
| 2020 | Filmfare Awards | Best Cinematography | Pankaj Kumar | Nominated | |
| 2020 | Filmfare Awards | Best Background Score | Daniel B George | Nominated | |
| 2020 | Filmfare Awards | Best Costume Design | Sheetal Sharma | Nominated | |
