= Lucknow Central =

2017 film directed by Ranjit Tiwari

- Directed by: Ranjit Tiwari
- Written by: Aseem Arora
- Story by: Ranjit Tiwari; Aseem Arora
- Produced by: Viacom18 Motion Pictures; Nikkhil Advani; Monisha Advani; Madhu Bhojwani
- Starring: Farhan Akhtar; Diana Penty; Virendra Saxena; Deepak Dobriyal; Ronit Roy; Gippy Grewal; Inaamulhaq; Rajesh Sharma
- Cinematography: Tushar Kanti Ray
- Edited by: Charu Shree Roy
- Music by: Songs: Arjunna Harjaie; Rochak Kohli; Tanishk Bagchi; Score: Arjunna Harjaie
- Production company: Emmay Entertainment
- Distributed by: Viacom18 Motion Pictures
- Release date: 15 September 2017
- Running time: 150 minutes
- Country: India
- Language: Hindi
- Budget: ₹300 million
- Box office: ₹169.5 million

Lucknow Central is a 2017 Indian Hindi-language prison film directed by Ranjit Tiwari, written by Aseem Arrora, and produced by Nikkhil Advani, Monisha Advani and Madhu Bhojwani under Emmay Entertainment and Viacom 18 Motion Pictures. The film stars Farhan Akhtar, Diana Penty, Ronit Roy, Gippy Grewal, Deepak Dobriyal, Rajesh Sharma and Inaamulhaq. It was released worldwide on 15 September 2017.

== Plot ==
Kishen Mohan Girhotra is a young man who belongs to Moradabad, a city in Uttar Pradesh. One unfateful day, Kishen gets accused of murder which lands him in Lucknow Central Jail, where he's awaiting his High Court trial for the death penalty. Meanwhile, a diligent NGO worker Gayatri Kashyap, is compelled to form a band of prisoners for the band competition, which is to be held in the dreaded jail of Lucknow Central that year, and this is how Kishen's and her paths cross. Kishen befriends four other inmates – Dikkat Ansari, Victor Chattopahdyay, Purushottam Pandit, Parminder Gill – convincing them to join the band. The dramatic narrative portrays how Kishen's life progresses in jail and how music becomes an intricate part of his journey, and the rest of the band's as well.

== Cast ==
- Farhan Akhtar as Kishan Mohan Girhotra
- Diana Penty as Gayatri Kashyap
- Ronit Roy as Inspector Raja Shrivastava
- Gippy Grewal as Parminder Singh Gill aka Pali
- Deepak Dobriyal as Victor Chattopadhyay
- Rajesh Sharma as Purushottam Madan Pandit
- Manav Vij as Tilakdhari
- Inaamulhaq as Dikkat Ansari
- Ravi Kishan as CM Pawan Singh Chaturvedi
- Brijendra Kala as Advocate Trivedi
- Virendra Saxena as Inspector General of Police
- Alok Pandey as Bunty

== Production ==
=== Development ===
Lucknow Central was officially announced on 28 April 2016 through Emmay Entertainment's YouTube channel. The idea to make this film was conceived when director Ranjit Tiwari read in the newspaper about a group of convicts who had formed a music band known as Healing Hearts in Lucknow Central Jail. The popularity of the band was such that quite often, they were invited to perform at special functions outside the prison.

About two or three years ago, I read a newspaper article about convicts forming a prison band in Lucknow Central jail. It was part of the reformation drive set up by the Uttar Pradesh government, that extended to other jails as well. They would all come together and perform on a special day. The band from Lucknow Central jail – called Healing Hearts – did especially well, and the superintendent of the jail at that time, V.K. Jain, took special permission to ensure that the band could go out and perform. They became so popular that they were invited to perform at weddings and birthdays. The jail even had to set up a booking counter for them!

— Ranjit Tiwari on the idea behind Lucknow Central.

Before finalizing the script of Lucknow Central, Tiwari and writer Aseem Arora got in touch with various music bands that were being operated from the central jails of India. Arora clarified that the story of Lucknow Central is inspired from real-life events that have taken place in Lucknow Central Jail, Delhi's Tihar Jail, Jammu's Kot Bhalwal Jail and Pune's Yerwada Jail.

=== Casting ===
In the year 2016, it was reported that the makers had finalized Farhan Akhtar for the lead role in Lucknow Central. Akhtar cited the film's social message and his inclination towards such roles as inspirations for signing the film. The actor said that "there should be a message that audience can take back home with them, be it in the form of an inspiration or social relevance; to me it is very important." The role of Gayatri Kashyap was initially supposed to be played by actress Kriti Sanon but she later opted out of the project as the shooting got delayed. In January 2017, actress Diana Penty was signed in to play the part; she was to essay an NGO worker.

=== Filming ===
The principal photography of the film commenced on 10 January 2017 at Film City, Mumbai where a replica of Lucknow Central Jail had been created for the shooting of the film. Apart from Mumbai, the shooting of Lucknow Central was also done in Lucknow and Varanasi. The official trailer was launched on 26 July 2017. The film hit the theaters on 15 September 2017.

== Soundtrack ==
Lucknow Central

Soundtrack album by Arjunna Harjaie, Sukhwinder Singh, Mychael Danna, Rochak Kohli and Tanishk Bagchi
- Released: 18 August 2017
- Recorded: 2016–2017
- Genre: Feature Film Soundtrack
- Length: 25:06
- Language: Hindi
- Label: T-Series
External audio
- Audio Jukebox on YouTube

The music is composed by Arjunna Harjaie, Sukhwinder Singh, Mychael Danna, Rochak Kohli and Tanishk Bagchi while the lyrics have been penned by Kumaar, Sukhwinder Singh, Mychael Danna and Adheesh Verma. Its first song, "Kaavaan Kaavaan", which is sung by Divya Kumar was released on 3 August 2017. The second song titled as "Meer-e-Kaarwan", which is sung by Amit Mishra and Neeti Mohan was released on 9 August 2017. The third single to be released was "Teen Kabootar", which is sung by Mohit Chauhan and Divya Kumar and rapped by Raftaar was released on 16 August 2017. The soundtrack was released by T-Series on 18 August 2017.

Track listing
No.	Title	Lyrics	Music	Singer(s)	Length
1.	"Kaavaan Kaavaan" (Original composition by Sukhwinder Singh & Mychael Danna)	Kumaar, Sukhwinder Singh, Mychael Danna	Recreated by Arjunna Harjaie	Divya Kumar	4:19
2.	"Meer-e-Kaarwan"	Adheesh Verma	Rochak Kohli	Amit Mishra, Neeti Mohan	6:03
3.	"Teen Kabootar"	Kumaar (Rap lyrics by Raftaar)	Arjunna Harjaie	Mohit Chauhan, Divya Kumar, Rap: Raftaar	4:04
4.	"Rangdaari"	Kumaar	Arjunna Harjaie	Arijit Singh	4:03
5.	"Kaavaan Kaavaan" (Remix)	Sukhwinder Singh, Mychael Danna, Kumaar	Sukhwinder Singh, Mychael Danna, Tanishk Bagchi	Sukhwinder Singh, Renesa Bagchi	3:16
6.	"Baaki Rab Pe Chhod De"	Kumaar	Tanishk Bagchi	Brijesh Shandilya, Arman Hasan, Tanishk Bagchi, Vayu	3:21
Total length:					25:06

== Critical reception ==
Rajeev Masand gave the film a rating of 2 out of 5 and said that, "A better title for Lucknow Central might have been Boredom Central. At nearly 2 hours and 30 minutes, it's far too long and far too dull to inspire any other response." Murtaza Ali Khan (film critic) of Huffington Post gave the film a rating of C− and said that, "'Lucknow Central' occasionally offers an interesting take on prison dynamics, but there is hardly anything here that we haven't seen before". Renuka Vyavahare of The Times of India praised the performances of the lead actors and said that, "What essentially works for LC is its classic ‘winning against all odds’ theme." The critic gave the film a rating of 3 out of 5. Rohit Vats of Hindustan Times felt that Lucknow Central is "too simple a narrative to capture the audience's imagination. We always know where it is heading." In conclusion the critic said that, "Lucknow Central fails to utilise its resources, especially Diana Penty, and loses out on a chance to become a really engaging film." and gave the film a rating of 2.5 out of 5. Saibal Chatterjee of NDTV gave the film a rating of 2 out of 5 and said that, "This is an unmemorable prison-break film but, because of some great supporting actors, Lucknow Central finds engaging moments."

Shubhra Gupta of The Indian Express gave the film a rating of 2 out of 5 and said that "It is the supporting cast which is spot on, especially Rajesh Sharma and Deepak Dobriyal. But more than anything else, it is the mawkish sentimentality which overcomes the story-telling." Kriti Tulsiani of News18 gave the film a rating of 1.5 out of 5 and said that "In a nutshell, despite a dependable cast and makers’ deep understanding of jail insides, Lucknow Central doesn't hit the right note and remains a film too far from perfect." Sukanya Verma of Rediff gave the film a rating of 2.5 out of 5 and said that, "'Low-hanging ambitions and straightforward conflict between negotiators of harm and reform renders Lucknow Central a surprising watch-ability'". Sonil Dedhia of Mid-Day gave the film a rating of 3 out of 5 and said that, "Farhan Akhtar, with an accent that's spot on, puts on an appreciable performance. The plusses in 'Lucknow Central' outnumber the weaknesses. It surely deserves a dekho."

== Accolades ==
Award Ceremony	Category	Recipient	Result	Ref.(s)
10th Mirchi Music Awards	Upcoming Lyricist of The Year	Adheesh Verma – "Meer-E-Kaarwan"	Nominated	
