= List of Hindi films of 2025 =

This is a list of Hindi cinema films released in 2025.

== Box office collection ==
The following is the list of highest-grossing Hindi cinema films released in 2025.

#	Implies that the film is multilingual and the gross collection figure includes the worldwide collection of the other simultaneously filmed version.

Highest grossing Hindi cinema films of 2025
Rank (Note: Sorted based on the lowest value when figures are presented as a range, and for the same value, the older item is given a higher order.)	Title	Production company	Distributor	Worldwide gross	Ref.
1	Dhurandhar	Jio Studios; B62 Studios	Jio Studios; PVR Inox Pictures	₹1,350.83 crore	
2	Chhaava	Maddock Films	Pen Marudhar; Yash Raj Films	₹797.34 crore	
3	Saiyaara	Yash Raj Films	Yash Raj Films	₹579.23 crore	
4	War 2	Yash Raj Films	Yash Raj Films	₹303–351 crore	
5	Mahavatar Narsimha (Note: This is an animated movie)	Kleem Productions	AA Films	₹300.82 crore #	(Note: Mahavatar Narsimha's reported worldwide grosses vary between ₹300 crore (Hindustan Times, Cinema Express, News18) – ₹324.5 crore (The Economic Times) – ₹325 crore (DNA India))
6	Sitaare Zameen Par	Aamir Khan Productions	PVR Inox Pictures; AA Films	₹266.49 crore	
7	Raid 2	T-Series Films; Panorama Studios	PVR Inox Pictures; Panorama Studios	₹243.06 crore	
8	Housefull 5	Nadiadwala Grandson Entertainment	Pen Marudhar	₹242.80–248.80 crore	
9	Sikandar	Nadiadwala Grandson Entertainment; Salman Khan Films	Pen Marudhar	₹176.18 crore	
10	Thamma	Maddock Films	PVR Inox Pictures; Yash Raj Films	₹169.75 crore	

== January–March ==
Opening		Title	Director	Cast	Studio (production house)	Ref.
J A N	3	The Rabbit House	Vaibhav Kulkarni	Amit Riyaan; Karishma; Padmanabh, Gagan Pradeep; Preeti Sharma; Suresh Kumbhar	Geetai Productions	
J A N	10	Fateh	Sonu Sood	Sonu Sood; Naseeruddin Shah; Jacqueline Fernandez	Zee Studios, Shakti Sagar Productions	
J A N	10	Match Fixing	Kedar Gaekwad	Vineet Kumar Singh; Raj Arjun; Shataf Figar; Anuja Sathe	Artarena Creations	
J A N	17	Emergency	Kangana Ranaut	Kangana Ranaut; Anupam Kher; Shreyas Talpade; Mahima Chaudhry; Milind Soman; Satish Kaushik	Zee Studios, Manikarnika Films	
J A N	17	Azaad	Abhishek Kapoor	Ajay Devgn; Diana Penty; Aaman Devgan; Rasha Thadani; Mohit Malik; Piyush Mishra	RSVP Movies, Guy In The Sky Pictures	
J A N	17	Mission Grey House	Naushad Siddiqui	Abeer Khan; Puja Sharma; Rajesh Sharma; Kiran Kumar; Nikhat Khan; Kamlesh Sawant; Raza Murad	Reliance Entertainment, Rafat Films Entertainment	
J A N	17	Sangee	Sumit Kulkarni	Sharib Hashmi; Sanjay Bishnoi; Gaurav More; Vidya Malvade; Shyamraj Patil; Martin Jishil	Yantrana Films, Armoks Films	
J A N	24	Hisaab Barabar	Ashwni Dhir	R. Madhavan; Neil Nitin Mukesh; Kirti Kulhari; Rashami Desai	Jio Studios, SP Cinecorp, ZEE5	
J A N	24	Sky Force	Sandeep Kewlani; Abhishek Anil Kapur	Akshay Kumar; Veer Pahariya; Sara Ali Khan; Nimrat Kaur	Jio Studios, Maddock Films, Leo Films	
J A N	24	Sweet Dreams	Victor Mukherjee	Amol Parashar; Mithila Palkar	Jio Studios, Mango People Media, Disney+Hotstar	
J A N	28	The Storyteller	Anant Mahadevan	Paresh Rawal; Adil Hussain; Revathi; Tannishtha Chatterjee	Jio Studios, Purpose Entertainment, Quest Films, Disney+Hotstar	
J A N	31	Deva	Rosshan Andrrews	Shahid Kapoor; Pooja Hegde	Zee Studios, Roy Kapur Films	
F E B	7	Loveyapa	Advait Chandan	Khushi Kapoor; Junaid Khan	Zee Studios, Phantom Studios, AGS Entertainment	
F E B	7	Badass Ravi Kumar	Keith Gomes	Himesh Reshammiya; Prabhu Deva; Kirti Kulhari; Sonia Kapoor; Rajesh Sharma; Johny Lever; Navneet Nishan; Manish Wadhwa; Sanjay Mishra; Anil George	Himesh Reshammiya Melodies	
F E B	7	Mrs.	Aarti Kadav	Sanya Malhotra; Nishant Dahiya; Kanwaljit Singh	Jio Studios, Baweja Studios, ZEE5	
F E B	7	The Mehta Boys	Boman Irani	Boman Irani; Avinash Tiwary	Irani Movietone, Chalkboard Entertainment, Amazon Prime Video	
F E B	11	Bobby Aur Rishi Ki Love Story	Kunal Kohli	Vardhan Puri; Kaveri Kapur	Jio Studios, The Production Headquarters, The Indian Scion Production, Disney+Hotstar	
F E B	14	Chhaava	Laxman Utekar	Vicky Kaushal; Rashmika Mandanna; Akshaye Khanna	Maddock Films	
F E B	14	Dhoom Dhaam	Rishab Seth	Pratik Gandhi; Yami Gautam	Jio Studios, B62 Studios, Netflix	
F E B	21	Mere Husband Ki Biwi	Mudassar Aziz	Arjun Kapoor; Rakul Preet Singh; Bhumi Pednekar	Pooja Entertainment	
F E B	21	Kaushaljis vs Kaushal	Seemaa Desai	Ashutosh Rana; Sheeba Chadha; Isha Talwar; Pavail Gulati	Jio Studios, Merry Go Round Studios, Mumbai Talkeez, JioHotstar	
F E B	27	Hindi Vindi	Ali Sayed	Mihir Ahuja; Neena Gupta; Guy Sebastian	24Six Films, Drishya Sharma Productions	
F E B	28	Shaila	Saki Shah	Rohit Chaudhary; Sara Khan; Sonam Arora; Aadhvikaa; Durvesh Rameshwaram; Hussain Khan; Ketan Raj Sharma	Reliance Entertainment, Riyom Films	
F E B	28	Crazxy	Girish Kohli	Sohum Shah	Sohum Shah Films	
F E B	28	Superboys of Malegaon	Reema Kagti	Adarsh Gourav; Vineet Kumar Singh; Shashank Arora; Anuj Singh Duhan	Amazon MGM Studios, Excel Entertainment, Tiger Baby Films	
F E B	28	Dil Dosti Aur Dogs	Viral Shah	Neena Gupta; Masumeh Makhija; Sharad Kelkar; Kunaal Roy Kapur; Keerti Gaekwad Kelkar; Tinu Anand; Ehan Bhat; Tridha Choudhury	Jio Studios, The Creative Tribe, JioHotstar	
M A R	7	Nadaaniyan	Shauna Gautam	Ibrahim Ali Khan; Khushi Kapoor; Mahima Chaudhry; Suniel Shetty; Dia Mirza; Jugal Hansraj	Dharmatic Entertainment, Netflix	
M A R	7	Riwaj	Manoj Sati	Myra Sareen; Aftab Shivdasani; Adhvik Mahajan; Mithun Chakraborty; Anita Raj; Jaya Prada	Kashish Khan Production, ZEE5	
M A R	14	The Diplomat	Shivam Nair	John Abraham; Sadia Khateeb; Revathy; Kumud Mishra	T-Series Films, JA Entertainment, Wakaoo Films, Fortune Pictures	
M A R	14	My Melbourne	Kabir Khan; Rima Das; Onir; Imtiaz Ali	Ryanna Skye; Kat Stewart; Jake Ryan; Arushi Sharma; Jackson Gallagher; Arka Das	Screen Australia, VicScreen, Mind Blowing Entertainment, Mind Blowing World, Soundfirm Post Production, Anticlock Films, Flying River Films, Window Seat Films, Kabir Khan Films	
M A R	14	Be Happy	Remo D'Souza	Abhishek Bachchan; Nora Fatehi; Nassar; Inayat Verma; Johnny Lever; Harleen Sethi	Remo D'Souza Entertainment, Amazon Prime Video	
M A R	14	Inn Galiyon Mein	Avinash Das	Vivaan Shah; Avantika Dassani; Javed Jaffrey	Yadunath Films	
M A R	14	Aachari Baa	Hardik Gajjar	Neena Gupta; Vatsal Sheth; Apoorva Arora; Kabir Bedi	Jio Studios, Hardik Gajjar Films, Backbencher Pictures	
M A R	21	Baida	Puneet Sharma	Sudhanshu Rai; Manisha Rai; Shobhit Sujay	MNM Entertainment	
M A R	21	Tumko Meri Kasam	Vikram Bhatt	Anupam Kher; Ishwak Singh; Adah Sharma; Esha Deol	Indira Entertainment	
M A R	21	Pintu Ki Pappi	Shiv Hare	Shushant; Jaanyaa Joshi; Viidhi; Ganesh Acharya; Murali Sharma; Vijay Raaz	Mythri Movie Makers, V2S Production & Entertainment	
M A R	30	Sikandar	AR Murugadoss	Salman Khan; Kajal Aggarwal; Rashmika Mandanna; Sathyaraj; Prateik Babbar	Nadiadwala Grandson Entertainment, Salman Khan Films	

== April–June ==
Opening		Title	Director	Cast	Studio (production house)	Ref.
A P R	10	Jaat	Gopichand Malineni	Sunny Deol; Randeep Hooda; Regina Cassandra; Saiyami Kher	Mythri Movie Makers, People Media Factory	
A P R	11	Chhorii 2	Vishal Furia	Nushrratt Bharuccha; Soha Ali Khan; Gashmeer Mahajani; Saurabh Goyal; Pallavi Ajay; Kuldeep Sareen; Hardika Sharma	T-Series Films, Abundantia Entertainment, Pshych Film, Tamarisk Lane, Amazon Prime Video	
A P R	18	Kesari Chapter 2	Karan Singh Tyagi	Akshay Kumar; R. Madhavan; Ananya Panday	Dharma Productions, Cape Of Good Films, Leo Media Collective	
A P R	18	Logout	Amit Golani	Babil Khan; Rasika Dugal; Gandharv Dewan; Nimisha Nair	Viacom18 Studios, Posham Pa Pictures, ZEE5	
A P R	18	The Secret of Devkaali	Niraj Chauhan	Niraj Chauhan; Bhumika Gurung; Mahesh Manjrekar; Ramkrishan Dhakad	Chauhan Production	
A P R	25	Ground Zero	Tejas Prabha Vijay Deoskar	Emraan Hashmi; Sai Tamhankar; Zoya Hussain; Mukesh Tiwari; Lalit Prabhakar	Excel Entertainment, Dreamzkrraft Entertainment, Talisman Films	
A P R	25	Jewel Thief	Kookie Gulati; Robbie Garewal	Saif Ali Khan; Jaideep Ahlawat; Nikita Dutta; Kunal Kapoor	Marflix Pictures, Netflix	
A P R	25	Phule	Anant Mahadevan	Pratik Gandhi; Patralekha	Zee Studios, Dancing Shiva Films, Kingsmen Productions	
A P R	25	Oye Bhootni Ke	Ajay Kailash Yadav	Mahaakshay Chakraborty; Nikita Sharma; Diana Khan; Ashoka Thackur; Chahat Mughal	Sahatyam Films, Vision Motion Films	
M A Y	1	Raid 2	Raj Kumar Gupta	Ajay Devgn; Riteish Deshmukh; Vaani Kapoor	T-Series Films, Panorama Studios	
M A Y	1	The Bhootnii	Sidhaant Sachdev	Sanjay Dutt; Mouni Roy; Sunny Singh; Palak Tiwari; Beyounick; Aasif Khan	Soham Rockstar Entertainment, Three Dimension Motion Pictures	
M A Y	1	Costao	Sejal Shah	Nawazuddin Siddiqui; Priya Bapat; Kishore Kumar G; Gagan Dev Riar	Bhanushali Studios, Bombay Fables, ZEE5	
M A Y	9	The Networker	Vikas Kumar Vishwakarma	Vikram Kochhar; Durgesh Kumar; Ishtiyak Khan; Rishabh Pathak; Brijendra Kala; Vindhya Tiwari; Nikhat Khan	Gutargoo Entertainment, Navritu Films	
M A Y	16	Romeo S3	Guddu Dhanoa	Thakur Anoop Singh; Palak Tiwari	Pen Studios, Wild River Pictures	
M A Y	23	Bhool Chuk Maaf	Karan Sharma	Rajkummar Rao; Wamiqa Gabbi	Amazon MGM Studios, Maddock Films	
M A Y	23	Kapkapiii	Sangeeth Sivan	Tusshar Kapoor; Shreyas Talpade; Jay Thakkar; Siddhi Idnani	Zee Studios, Bravo Entertainment	
M A Y	23	Pune Highway	Rahul da Cunha; Bugs Bhargava Krishna	Jim Sarbh; Amit Sadh; Manjari Fadnis; Ketaki Narayan	Drop D Films, Ten Years Younger Productions	
M A Y	23	Kesari Veer	Prince Dhiman	Suniel Shetty; Vivek Oberoi; Sooraj Pancholi; Akansha Sharma	Chauhan Studios	
M A Y	30	Chidiya	Mehran Amrohi	Vinay Pathak; Amruta Subhash; Svar Kamble; Ayush Pathak	Smiley Films, Key Media Works	
M A Y	30	Interrogation	Ajoy Varma Raja	Manu Singh; Rajpal Yadav; Darshan Jariwala; Yashpal Sharm; Girish Kulkarni	Aryan Brothers Entertainment Film, Naam Mein Kya Rakha Hai Production, ZEE5	
J U N	4	Stolen	Karan Tejpal	Abhishek Banerjee; Harish Khanna; Mia Maelzer; Sahidur Rahaman; Shubham Vardhan	Jungle Book Studio, Amazon Prime Video	
J U N	6	Housefull 5	Tarun Mansukhani	Akshay Kumar; Riteish Deshmukh; Sanjay Dutt; Abhishek Bachchan; Nana Patekar; Fardeen Khan; Dino Morea; Chunky Pandey; Jackie Shroff; Nikitin Dheer; Shreyas Talpade; Ranjeet; Johnny Lever; Jacqueline Fernandez; Nargis Fakhri; Sonam Bajwa; Chitrangda Singh; Soundarya Sharma	Nadiadwala Grandson Entertainment	
J U N	20	Sitaare Zameen Par	R. S. Prasanna	Aamir Khan; Genelia Deshmukh	Aamir Khan Productions	
J U N	20	Detective Sherdil	Ravi Chhabriya	Diljit Dosanjh; Diana Penty; Boman Irani; Chunky Panday; Ratna Pathak Shah; Banita Sandhu; Sumeet Vyas	AAZ Films, Offside Entertainment, Maurya Entertainment, ZEE5	
J U N	27	Maa	Vishal Furia	Kajol; Ronit Roy; Indraneil Sengupta; Kherin Sharma	Jio Studios, Devgn Films, Panorama Studios	
J U N	27	Well Done CA Sahab!	Sarvesh Kumar Singh	Gopal Datt; Gaurav Paswala; Jyoti Kapoor; Sayandeep Sengupta; Nishma Soni; Archan Trivedi; Makrand Shukla; Samar Jajoriya; Sam Jajoriya; Rama Krishna Dixit	Figures and Frames	

== July–September ==
Opening		Title	Director	Cast	Studio (production house)	Ref.
J U L	4	Metro... In Dino	Anurag Basu	Aditya Roy Kapur; Sara Ali Khan; Anupam Kher; Neena Gupta; Pankaj Tripathi; Konkona Sen Sharma; Ali Fazal; Fatima Sana Shaikh	T-Series Films, Anurag Basu Productions	
J U L	4	Kaalidhar Laapata	Madhumita	Abhishek Bachchan; Daivik Bhagela; Mohammed Zeeshan Ayyub	Zee Studios, Emmay Entertainment, ZEE5	
J U L	11	Maalik	Pulkit	Rajkummar Rao; Manushi Chhillar; Prosenjit Chatterjee	Tips Industries, Northern Lights Films	
J U L	11	Aankhon Ki Gustaakhiyan	Santosh Singh	Vikrant Massey; Shanaya Kapoor	Zee Studios, Mini Films	
J U L	11	Aap Jaisa Koi	Vivek Soni	R. Madhavan; Fatima Sana Shaikh	Dharmatic Entertainment, Netflix	
J U L	18	Saiyaara	Mohit Suri	Ahaan Panday; Aneet Padda	Yash Raj Films	
J U L	18	Tanvi the Great	Anupam Kher	Anupam Kher; Shubhangi Dutt; Iain Glen; Boman Irani; Jackie Shroff; Arvind Swami; Pallavi Joshi; Karan Tacker; Nassar	Excel Entertainment, NFDC, Anupam Kher Studio	
J U L	18	Nikita Roy	Kussh Sinha	Sonakshi Sinha; Arjun Rampal; Paresh Rawal; Suhail Nayyar	Nicky Vicky Bhagnani Films, Kratos Entertainment, Nikita Pai Films	
J U L	18	Murderbaad	Arnab Chatterjee	Nakul Roshan Sahdev; Kanikka Kapur; Sharib Hashmi; Amole Gupte; Saloni Batra	Reliance Entertainment, ACjee Entertainment	
J U L	18	Sant Tukaram	Aditya Om	Subodh Bhave; Sheena Chohan; Sanjay Mishra; Arun Govil	Curzon Films	
J U L	25	Mahavatar Narsimha	Ashwin Kumar	Animated characters	Hombale Films, Kleem Productions	
J U L	25	So Long Valley	Man Singh	Tridha Choudhury; Akanksha Puri; Vikram Kochhar; Alisha Parveen; Pankaj Choudhary	Sourya Studios	
J U L	25	Sarzameen	Kayoze Irani	Prithviraj Sukumaran; Kajol; Ibrahim Ali Khan	Star Studios, Dharma Productions, JioHotstar	
J U L	25	Rasa	Angith Jayaraj; Preetish Jayaraj	Shishir Sharma; Rishi Bissa; Vishishtha Chawla; Rajiv Kumar	Purnam Films, Haroon Rashid Films, Vidya Entertainment	
A U G	1	Dhadak 2	Shazia Iqbal	Siddhant Chaturvedi; Triptii Dimri	Zee Studios, Dharma Productions, Cloud 9 Pictures	
A U G	1	Son of Sardaar 2	Vijay Kumar Arora	Ajay Devgn; Mrunal Thakur; Ravi Kishan	Jio Studios, Devgn Films, YRV Studios	
A U G	8	Andaaz 2	Suneel Darshan	Aayush Kumar; Akaisha; Natasha Fernandez	Shree Krishna International	
A U G	8	Udaipur Files	Bharat Shrinat	Vijay Raaz; Rajneesh Duggal; Preeti Jhangiani; Kanchi Singh; Kamlesh Sawant	Jani Firefox Films	
A U G	8	Ghich Pich	Ankur Singla	Nitesh Pandey; Satyajit Sharma; Geeta Agrawal Sharma; Kabir Nanda; Aryan Singh Rana; Shhivam Kakar	Barsaati Films, Platoon One Films	
A U G	14	War 2	Ayan Mukerji	Hrithik Roshan; N. T. Rama Rao Jr.; Kiara Advani	Yash Raj Films	
A U G	14	Tehran	Arun Gopalan	John Abraham; Neeru Bajwa; Manushi Chhillar	Maddock Films, Bake My Cake Films, ZEE5	
A U G	29	Param Sundari	Tushar Jalota	Sidharth Malhotra; Janhvi Kapoor	Maddock Films	
A U G	29	Songs of Paradise	Danish Renzu	Soni Razdan; Saba Azad; Zain Khan Durrani; Sheeba Chaddha; Taaruk Raina	Excel Entertainment, Renzu Films, Apple Tree Pictures, Amazon Prime Video	
S E P	5	Baaghi 4	A. Harsha	Tiger Shroff; Sanjay Dutt; Sonam Bajwa; Harnaaz Sandhu	Nadiadwala Grandson Entertainment	
S E P	5	The Bengal Files	Vivek Agnihotri	Mithun Chakraborty; Anupam Kher; Puneet Issar; Govind Namdev; Babbu Maan; Pallavi Joshi; Palomi Ghosh	Abhishek Agarwal Arts, I Am Buddha	
S E P	5	Inspector Zende	Chinmay Mandlekar	Manoj Bajpayee; Jim Sarbh; Bhalchandra Kadam; Sachin Khedekar; Girija Oak; Harish Dudhade	Northern Lights Films, Netflix	
S E P	5	Ufff Yeh Siyapaa	G. Ashok	Soham Shah; Nushrratt Bharuccha; Nora Fatehi; Omkar Kapoor; Sharib Hashmi	Luv Films	
S E P	5	Humans in the Loop	Aranya Sahay	Sonal Madhushankar; Ridhima Singh; Gita Guha	Storiculture, Museum of Imagined Futures, SAUV Films	
S E P	12	Heer Express	Umesh Shukla	Divita Juneja; Ashutosh Rana; Sanjay Mishra; Gulshan Grover; Prit Kamani	Tulip Entertainment, Divisa Entertainment, Merry Go Round Studios	
S E P	12	Love in Vietnam	Rahat Shah Kazmi	Shantanu Maheshwari; Avneet Kaur; Khả Ngân	Zee Studios, Blue Lotus Creatives, Innovations India, Rahat Kazmi Film Studios, Zebaish Entertainment, Tariq Khan Productions, Mango Tree Entertainment	
S E P	12	Ek Chatur Naar	Umesh Shukla	Divya Khosla Kumar; Neil Nitin Mukesh	T-Series Films, Merry Go Round Studios	
S E P	12	Jugnuma: The Fable	Raam Reddy	Manoj Bajpayee; Deepak Dobriyal; Priyanka Bose; Tillotama Shome; Hiral Sidhu; Awan Pookot	Prspctvs Productions, Maxmedia, Flip Films, Sikhya Entertainment	
S E P	12	Mannu Kya Karegga	Ssanjay Tripaathy	Vyom Yadav; Saachi Bindra; Vinay Pathak; Kumud Mishra; Rajesh Kumar; Charu Shankar; Brijendra Kala	Curious Eyes Cinema	
S E P	19	Jolly LLB 3	Subhash Kapoor	Akshay Kumar; Arshad Warsi; Huma Qureshi; Amrita Rao; Saurabh Shukla; Gajraj Rao	Star Studio18, Kangra Talkies	
S E P	19	Nishaanchi	Anurag Kashyap	Aaishvary Thackeray; Vedika Pinto; Monika Panwar; Mohammed Zeeshan Ayyub	Amazon MGM Studios, JAR Pictures, Flip Films	
S E P	19	Ajey: The Untold Story of a Yogi	Ravindra Gautam	Anant Joshi; Paresh Rawal; Dinesh Lal Yadav	Samrat Cinematics	
S E P	26	Homebound	Neeraj Ghaywan	Ishaan Khatter; Vishal Jethwa; Janhvi Kapoor	Dharma Productions	
S E P	26	Tu Meri Poori Kahani	Suhrita Das	Arhaan Pateel; Shammi Duhan; Hirranya Ojha	Indira Entertainment	

== October–December ==
Opening		Title	Director	Cast	Studio (production house)	Ref.
O C T	2	Sunny Sanskari Ki Tulsi Kumari	Shashank Khaitan	Varun Dhawan; Janhvi Kapoor; Sanya Malhotra; Rohit Saraf	Dharma Productions, Mentor Disciple Entertainment	
O C T	10	Lord Curzon Ki Haveli	Anshuman Jha	Arjun Mathur; Rasika Dugal; Tanmay Dhanania; Zoha Rahman	Golden Ratio Films, First Ray Films, Jetty Productions	
O C T	10	Controll	Safdar Abbas	Thakur Anoop Singh; Rohit Roy; Priya Anand	Pen Studios, Yashi Studios	
O C T	17	Bhagwat: Chapter One – Raakshas	Akshay Shere	Arshad Warsi; Jitendra Kumar; Ayesha Kaduskar	Jio Studios, Baweja Studios, Dog ‘n’ Bone Pictures. ZEE5	
O C T	17	Greater Kalesh	Aditya Chandiok	Ahsaas Channa; Supriya Shukla	Terrible Tinny Tales, Netflix	
O C T	17	WingMan (The Universal Irony of Love)	Anuj Gulati	Shashank Arora; Trimala Adhikari; Auritra Ghosh	Lionsgate Play	
O C T	21	Thamma	Aditya Sarpotdar	Ayushmann Khurrana; Rashmika Mandanna; Nawazuddin Siddiqui; Paresh Rawal	Maddock Films	
O C T	21	Ek Deewane Ki Deewaniyat	Milap Zaveri	Harshvardhan Rane; Sonam Bajwa	Desi Movies Factory, Play DMF	
O C T	31	The Taj Story	Tushar Amrish Goel	Paresh Rawal; Zakir Hussain; Amruta Khanvilkar; Sneha Wagh; Namit Das	Swarnim Global Services	
O C T	31	Single Salma	Nachiket Samant	Huma Qureshi; Sunny Singh; Shreyas Talpade	Star Studio18, Elemen3 Entertainment	
N O V	7	Haq	Suparn Verma	Emraan Hashmi; Yami Gautam	Junglee Pictures, Insomnia Films, Baweja Studios	
N O V	7	Jatadhara (Note: The film was produced in both the Telugu and Hindi languages)	Venkat Kalyan; Abhishek Jaiswal	Sudheer Babu; Sonakshi Sinha; Divya Khosla Kumar	Zee Studios, Ess Kay Gee Entertainment, Sudheer Babu Productions	
N O V	7	Jassi Weds Jassi	Paran Bawa	Harshh Vardhan Singh Deo; Rehmat Rattan; Ranvir Shorey; Sikandar Kher; Manu Rishi Chadha	Divinity Studio	
N O V	7	Baramulla	Aditya Suhas Jambhale	Manav Kaul; Bhasha Sumbli	Jio Studios, B62 Studios, Netflix	
N O V	14	De De Pyaar De 2	Anshul Sharma	Ajay Devgn; R. Madhavan; Rakul Preet Singh	T-Series Films, Luv Films	
N O V	14	Agra	Kanu Behl	Mohit Agarwal; Priyanka Bose; Ruhani Sharma; Rahul Roy	Saregama, UFO Moviez, O28 Films	
N O V	14	2020 Delhi	Devendra Malviya	Brijendra Kala; Samar Jai Singh; Siddharth Bharadwaj	Midas Touch Films	
N O V	14	Kaal Trighori	Nitin Vaidya	Arbaaz Khan; Rituparna Sengupta; Mahesh Manjrekar; Aditya Srivastava; Mugdha Godse; Rajesh Sharma	Pen Studios, Navin Productions	
N O V	14	Nishaanchi 2	Anurag Kashyap	Aaishvary Thackeray; Vedika Pinto; Monika Panwar; Mohammed Zeeshan Ayyub	Amazon MGM Studios, JAR Pictures, Flip Films, Amazon Prime Video	
N O V	21	120 Bahadur	Razneesh ‘Razy’ Ghai	Farhan Akhtar; Raashii Khanna	Excel Entertainment, Trigger Happy Studios	
N O V	21	Mastiii 4	Milap Zaveri	Riteish Deshmukh; Vivek Oberoi; Aftab Shivdasani; Arshad Warsi; Tusshar Kapoor; Shreya Sharma; Elnaaz Norouzi; Ruhi Singh	Balaji Motion Pictures, Waveband Production, Maruti International	
N O V	28	Tere Ishk Mein	Aanand L. Rai	Dhanush; Kriti Sanon	T-Series Films, Colour Yellow Productions	
N O V	28	Gustaakh Ishq	Vibhu Puri	Naseeruddin Shah; Fatima Sana Shaikh; Vijay Varma; Sharib Hashmi	Stage 5 Productions	
N O V	28	Me No Pause Me Play	Samar K Mukharjee	Kamya Panjabi; Deepshikha Nagpal; Manoj Kumar Sharma; Aman Verma; Sudha Chandran	Digi Filming, Mirrro Films	
N O V	28	Kaisi Ye Paheli	Ananyabrata Chakravorty	Rajit Kapoor; Sukant Goel; Chittaranjan Giri; Sadhana Singh	Take Pictures	
D E C	5	Dhurandhar	Aditya Dhar	Ranveer Singh; Akshaye Khanna; Sanjay Dutt; Arjun Rampal; R. Madhavan; Sara Arjun; Rakesh Bedi	Jio Studios, B62 Studios	
D E C	12	Kis Kisko Pyaar Karoon 2	Anukalp Goswami	Kapil Sharma; Manjot Singh; Hira Warina; Tridha Choudhury; Parul Gulati; Ayesha Khan	Star Studio18, Venus Worldwide Entertainment, Abbas-Mustan Film Production	
D E C	12	Saali Mohabbat	Tisca Chopra	Radhika Apte; Divyenndu; Anshumaan Pushkar; Anurag Kashyap	Stage 5 Prdoction, Jio Studios, ZEE5	
D E C	12	The Great Shamsuddin Family	Anusha Rizvi	Kritika Kamra; Shreya Dhanwanthary; Sheeba Chaddha; Farida Jalal; Purab Kohli	Star Studio18, Third World Films Production, JioHotstar	
D E C	19	Raat Akeli Hai: The Bansal Murders	Honey Trehan	Nawazuddin Siddiqui; Radhika Apte; Chitrangada Singh; Rajat Kapoor; Revathi; Deepti Naval; Sanjay Kapoor	RSVP Movies, MacGuffin Pictures	
D E C	19	Durlabh Prasad Ki Dusri Shadi	Siddhant Raj Singh	Sanjay Mishra; Mahima Chaudhry	Eksha Entertainment	
D E C	25	Tu Meri Main Tera Main Tera Tu Meri	Sameer Vidwans	Kartik Aaryan; Ananya Panday; Neena Gupta; Jackie Shroff	Dharma Productions, Namah Pictures	

== See also ==
- Lists of Hindi films
- List of Hindi films of 2024
- List of Hindi films of 2026
