= Screen Award for Best Actress =

Annual film award in India

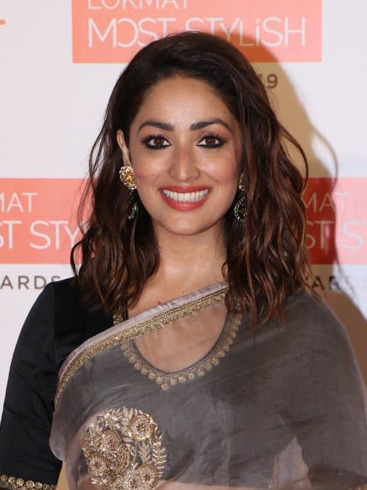
- The 2026 recipient: Yami Gautam
- Awarded for: Best Performance by an Actress in a Leading Role
- Country: India
- Presented by: Screen India
- First award: Madhuri Dixit, Hum Aapke Hain Koun..! (1995)
- Currently held by: Yami Gautam, Haq (2026)

The Screen Award for Best Actress is one of the Screen Awards of merit presented annually by a distinguished panel of judges from the Indian "Bollywood" film industry, to recognise an actress who has delivered an outstanding performance in a leading role.

== Superlatives ==
Superlative	Actor	Record
Actress with most awards	Vidya Balan	5
Actress with most consecutive awards	Vidya Balan	4
Actress with most nominations	Kajol; Aishwarya Rai	9
Actress with most nominations without ever winning	Karisma Kapoor, Preity Zinta, Kangana Ranaut	5
Actress with most nominations in a single year	Kajol (1999) , Aishwarya Rai (2000) , Priyanka Chopra (2010), Vidya Balan (2012), Deepika Padukone (2014); Alia Bhatt (2017), Anushka Sharma (2017)	2
Eldest winner	Vidya Balan	38
Eldest nominee	Sharmila Tagore	61
Youngest winner	Alia Bhatt	23
Youngest nominee	Kajol, Ayesha Takia	20

== Multiple winners ==
- 5 Wins : Vidya Balan
- 3 Wins : Madhuri Dixit, Alia Bhatt
- 2 Wins : Kajol, Aishwarya Rai, Rani Mukerji, Kareena Kapoor, Priyanka Chopra and Deepika Padukone

== Multiple nominees ==
- 9 Nominations : Kajol, Aishwarya Rai
- 8 Nominations : Rani Mukerji, Priyanka Chopra
- 7 Nominations : Tabu, Deepika Padukone, Vidya Balan
- 6 Nominations : Alia Bhatt
- 5 Nominations : Madhuri Dixit, Karisma Kapoor, Preity Zinta, Kareena Kapoor, Kangana Ranaut

== Winners and nominees ==
Table key
Indicates the winner

† - Indicates the performance also "Won" the Filmfare Award for Best Actress.
‡ - Indicates the performance was also "Nominated" for the Filmfare Award for Best Actress.

=== 1990s ===
Year	Photos of winners	Actress	Film	Character
1995				
1995		Madhuri Dixit †	Hum Aapke Hain Koun...!	Nisha Choudhury
1995		Kajol ‡	Yeh Dillagi	Sapna Bannerjee
1996
1996		Madhuri Dixit	Raja	Madhu Garewal
1996		Kajol †	Dilwale Dulhania Le Jayenge	Simran Singh
1997				
1997		Manisha Koirala ‡	Khamoshi: The Musical	Annie J. Braganza
1997		Juhi Chawla ‡	Daraar	Priya Bhatia
1997		Karisma Kapoor †	Raja Hindustani	Aarti Sehgal
1998				
1998		Madhuri Dixit	Mrityudand	Ketki
1998		Juhi Chawla ‡	Yes Boss	Seema Kapoor
1998		Rekha	Aastha	Mansi
1998		Sridevi ‡	Judaai	Kaajal Verma
1998		Tabu ‡	Virasat	Gehna
1999				
1999		Kajol ‡	Dushman	Sonia / Naina Saigal
1999		Kajol †	Kuch Kuch Hota Hai	Anjali Sharma
1999		Manisha Koirala ‡	Dil Se..	Meghna
1999		Pooja Bhatt	Zakhm	Mrs. Desai
1999		Rani Mukerji	Ghulam	Alisha

=== 2000s ===
Year	Photos of winners	Actress	Film	Character
2000				
2000		Aishwarya Rai †	Hum Dil De Chuke Sanam	Nandini Durbar
2000		Aishwarya Rai ‡	Taal	Mansi Shankar
2000		Kajol ‡	Hum Aapke Dil Mein Rehte Hain	Megha
2000		Karisma Kapoor ‡	Biwi No.1	Pooja Mehra
2000		Shabana Azmi	Godmother	Rambhi
2000		Tabu ‡	Hu Tu Tu	Paana Barve
2001				
2001		Tabu ‡	Astitva	Aditi Pandit
2001		Aishwarya Rai ‡	Hamara Dil Aapke Paas Hai	Preeti Vyas
2001		Karisma Kapoor †	Fiza	Fiza Ikramullah
2001		Madhuri Dixit ‡	Pukar	Anjali
2001		Preity Zinta ‡	Kya Kehna	Priya Bakshi
2002				
2002		Kajol †	Kabhi Khushi Kabhie Gham	Anjali Sharma
2002		Amisha Patel ‡	Gadar: Ek Prem Katha	Sakina
2002		Karisma Kapoor ‡	Zubeidaa	Zubeida Begum
2002		Tabu ‡	Chandni Bar	Mumtaz Ali Ansari
2002		Urmila Matondkar	Pyaar Tune Kya Kiya	Ria Jaiswal
2003				
2003		Aishwarya Rai †	Devdas	Parvati "Paro" Chakraborty
2003		Karisma Kapoor ‡	Shakti – The Power	Nandini
2003		Preity Zinta	Dil Hai Tumhaara	Shalu
2003		Rani Mukerji ‡	Saathiya	Suhani Sharma
2003		Tabu	Filhaal...	Rewa Singh
2004				
2004		Urmila Matondkar ‡	Bhoot	Swati
2004		Bhoomika Chawla ‡	Tere Naam	Nirjara Bharadwaj
2004		Hema Malini ‡	Baghban	Pooja Malhotra
2004		Preity Zinta †	Kal Ho Naa Ho	Naina Catherine Kapur
2004		Rani Mukerji ‡	Chalte Chalte	Priya Chopra
2004		Raveena Tandon	Satta	Anuradha Sehgal
2004		Sushmita Sen	Samay: When Time Strikes	ACP Malvika Chauhan
2005				
2005		Rani Mukerji †	Hum Tum	Rhea Prakash
2005		Aishwarya Rai ‡	Raincoat	Neerja
2005		Kareena Kapoor	Dev	Aaliya
2005		Preity Zinta ‡	Veer-Zaara	Zaara Hayaat Khan
2005		Shilpa Shetty ‡	Phir Milenge	Tamanna Sahni
2005		Urmila Matondkar ‡	Ek Hasina Thi	Sarika Vartak
2006
2006		Rani Mukerji †	Black	Michelle McNally
2006		Juhi Chawla	My Brother Nikhil	Anamika
2006		Konkona Sen Sharma	Page 3	Madhvi Sharma
2006		Preity Zinta ‡	Salaam Namaste	Ambar "Amby" Malhotra
2006		Sharmila Tagore ‡	Viruddh... Family Comes First	Sumitra V. Patwardhan
2007				
2007		Kareena Kapoor ‡	Omkara	Dolly Mishra
2007		Aishwarya Rai ‡	Dhoom 2	Sunehri
2007		Amrita Rao	Vivah	Poonam
2007		Ayesha Takia	Dor	Meera
2007		Bipasha Basu ‡	Corporate	Nishiganda 'Nishi' Dasgupta
2007		Kajol †	Fanaa	Zooni Ali Beg\Qadri
2008
2008		Kareena Kapoor †	Jab We Met	Geet Dhillon
2008		Aishwarya Rai ‡	Guru	Sujata Desai
2008		Tabu	Cheeni Kum	Nina Verma
2009				
2009		Priyanka Chopra †	Fashion	Meghna Mathur
2009		Aishwarya Rai Bachchan ‡	Jodhaa Akbar	Jodhaa Bai
2009		Asin ‡	Ghajini	Kalpana Shetty
2009		Genelia D'souza	Jaane Tu... Ya Jaane Na	Aditi Mahant
2009		Kajol ‡	U Me Aur Hum	Piya Saxena/Malhotra

=== 2010s ===
Year	Photos of winners	Actress	Film	Character
2010				
2010		Vidya Balan †	Paa	Vidya
2010		Deepika Padukone ‡	Love Aaj Kal	Meera Pandit
2010		Kareena Kapoor ‡	3 Idiots	Pia Sahastrabudhhe
2010		Katrina Kaif ‡	New York	Maya Shaikh
2010		Priyanka Chopra ‡	Kaminey	Sweety Shekhar Bhope
2010		Priyanka Chopra	What's Your Raashee?	12 characters
2011
2011		Vidya Balan ‡	Ishqiya	Krishna Varma
2011		Aishwarya Rai Bachchan ‡	Guzaarish	Sofia D'Souza
2011		Anushka Sharma ‡	Band Baaja Baaraat	Shruti Kakkar
2011		Kajol †	My Name Is Khan	Mandira Khan
2011		Neetu Singh	Do Dooni Chaar	Kusum Duggal
2012
2012		Vidya Balan †	The Dirty Picture	Silk / Reshma
2012		Kalki Koechlin	Shaitan	Amrita Jayshankar
2012		Kangana Ranaut	Tanu Weds Manu	Tanuja "Tanu" Trivedi
2012		Priyanka Chopra ‡	7 Khoon Maaf	Susanna Anna-Marie Johannes
2012		Rani Mukerji † won Filmfare Award for Best Supporting Actress	No One Killed Jessica	Meera Gaity
2012		Vidya Balan ‡	No One Killed Jessica	Sabrina Lal
2013
2013		Vidya Balan †	Kahaani	Vidya Bagchi
2013		Deepika Padukone ‡	Cocktail	Veronica Malaney
2013		Kareena Kapoor ‡	Heroine	Mahi Arora
2013		Parineeti Chopra ‡	Ishaqzaade	Zoya Qureshi
2013		Priyanka Chopra ‡	Barfi!	Jhilmil Chatterjee
2013		Sridevi ‡	English Vinglish	Shashi Godbole
2014				
2014		Deepika Padukone †	Goliyon Ki Raasleela Ram-Leela	Leela Sanera
2014		Deepika Padukone ‡	Chennai Express	Meenalochini Azhagu Sundaram
2014		Chitrangada Singh	Inkaar	Maya Luthra
2014		Nimrat Kaur	The Lunchbox	Ila
2014		Parineeti Chopra ‡	Shuddh Desi Romance	Gayatri
2014		Shraddha Kapoor ‡	Aashiqui 2	Aarohi Keshav Shirke
2014		Sonakshi Sinha ‡	Lootera	Pakhi Roy Choudhary
2015				
2015		Priyanka Chopra ‡	Mary Kom	Mary Kom
2015		Alia Bhatt ‡	Highway	Veera Tripathi
2015		Deepika Padukone	Finding Fanny	Angelina 'Angie'
2015		Kangana Ranaut †	Queen	Rani Mehra
2015		Parineeti Chopra	Hasee Toh Phasee	Dr. Meeta Solanki
2015		Rani Mukerji ‡	Mardaani	Shivani Shivaji Roy
2016				
2016		Deepika Padukone †	Piku	Piku Banerjee
2016		Anushka Sharma ‡	NH10	Meera
2016		Kalki Koechlin	Margarita with a Straw	Laila
2016		Kangana Ranaut ‡	Tanu Weds Manu Returns	Tanuja "Tanu" Trivedi / Kumari "Kusum" Sangwan (Datto)
2016		Priyanka Chopra	Dil Dhadakne Do	Ayesha Mehra/Sangha
2016		Sonam Kapoor ‡	Dolly Ki Doli	Dolly
2017				
2017		Alia Bhatt †	Udta Punjab	Bauria/ Mary Jane
2017		Alia Bhatt ‡	Dear Zindagi	Kaira
2017		Anushka Sharma ‡	Ae Dil Hai Mushkil	Alizeh Khan
2017		Anushka Sharma	Sultan	Aarfa Ali Khan
2017		Sonam Kapoor ‡	Neerja	Neerja Bhanot
2017		Taapsee Pannu	Pink	Meenal Arora
2018				
2018		Vidya Balan †	Tumhari Sulu	Sulochana/Sulu
2018		Alia Bhatt ‡	Badrinath Ki Dulhania	Vaidehi Trivedi
2018		Bhumi Pednekar ‡	Shubh Mangal Saavdhan	Sugandha
2018		Fatima Sana Shaikh	Dangal	Geeta Phogat
2018		Kangana Ranaut	Simran	Praful Patel / Simran
2018		Kriti Sanon	Bareilly Ki Barfi	Bitti Mishra
2018		Sridevi ‡	Mom	Devki Sabarwal
2019				
2019		Alia Bhatt †	Raazi	Sehmat Khan
2019		Deepika Padukone ‡	Padmaavat	Rani Padmani
2019		Rani Mukerji ‡	Hichki	Ms. Naina Mathur
2019		Taapsee Pannu	Manmarziyaan	Rumi Bagga
2019		Tabu ‡	Andhadhun	Simi

=== 2020s ===
Year	Photos of winners	Actress	Film	Character
2020				
2020		Alia Bhatt †	Gully Boy	Safeena Firdausi
2020		Kangana Ranaut ‡	Manikarnika: The Queen of Jhansi	Rani Lakshmi Bai
2020		Katrina Kaif	Bharat	Kumud Raina
2020		Taapsee Pannu	Badla	Naina Sethi
2020		Vidya Balan ‡	Mission Mangal	Tara Shinde
2026				
2026		Yami Gautam	Haq	Shazia Bano
2026		Triptii Dimri	Dhadak 2	Vidhi Bharadwaj
2026		Kriti Sanon	Tere Ishk Mein	Mukti Beniwal
2026		Sonal Madhushankar	Humans in the Loop	Nehma
2026		Konkona Sen Sharma	Metro… In Dino	Kajol Ghosh Sisodiya
2026		Monika Panwar	Nishaanchi	Manjari
2026		Radhika Apte	Sister Midnight	Uma

== See also ==
- Screen Awards
- Bollywood
- Cinema of India
