= PK Lele A Salesman =

2018 Indian comedy film

- Directed by: Manav Sohal
- Story by: Manav Sohal
- Produced by: Shailesh Gosrani; Manav Sohal
- Starring: Manav Sohal; Brijendra Kala; Shravani Goswami; Vaishnavi Dhanraj
- Music by: Nayab Ali
- Production company: Mumbai Talkies Company
- Release date: 14 December 2018
- Country: India
- Language: Hindi
- Box office: est. ₹ 1.20Lakh

PK Lele A Salesman is an Indian adult black comedy film, written and directed by Manav Sohal and produced by Shailesh Gosrani and Manav Sohal under the banner of Mumbai Talkies Company. The film stars Manav Sohal, Brijendra Kala, Sravani Goswami and Vaishnavi Dhanraj in lead roles Jiten Mukhi and Falguni Rajani were seen in the film. The film was released on 14 December 2018.

== Synopsis ==
Two good-hearted but eccentric salesmen, PK and Lele, lead a simple life and work for undergarment brand Anmol Macho for their living. However, their lives take an expected turn as PK falls in love with a business tycoon's daughter Mary Marlo and tries to impress her.

== Cast ==
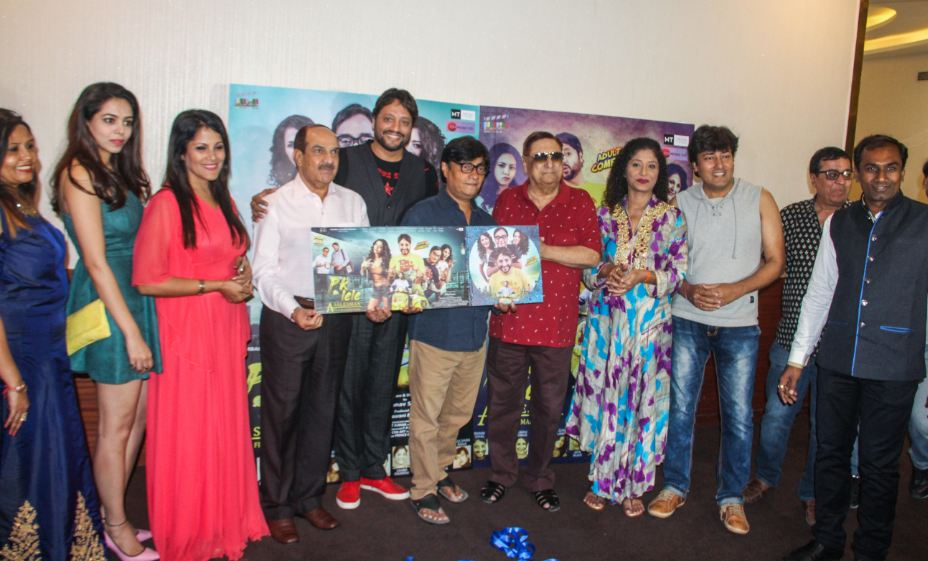
Team PK Lele during the Music Launch in Mumbai, India

- Manav Sohal as Mr. PK
- Brijendra Kala as Mr. Lele
- Shravani Goswami as Monika Marlo
- Vaishnavi Dhanraj as Mary Marlo

== Soundtrack ==
PK Lele A Salesman

Soundtrack album by Nayab Ali
- Released: 5 December 2018
- Recorded: 2018
- Genre: Feature film soundtrack
- Length: 11:25
- Language: Hindi
- Label: Zee Music Company
External audio
- Official Audio Jukebox on YouTube

Track listing
No.	Title	Lyrics	Singer(s)	Length
1.	"Zinda Hun Main"	Saani Aslam	Nayab Ali	4:47
2.	"PK Naa Isda"	Arvind Singh Sohal	Nayab Ali	3:16
3.	"PK Se Lele"	Arvind Singh Sohal	Nayab Ali	3:22
Total length:				11:25

The songs of film are composed by Nayab Ali. The lyrics are written by Saani Aslam and Arvind Singh Sohal.
