= Labeled data =

Group of samples that have been tagged with one or more labels

Labeled data is a group of samples that have been tagged with one or more labels. Labeling typically takes a set of unlabeled data and augments each piece of it with informative tags called judgments. For example, a data label might indicate whether a photo contains a horse or a cow, which words were uttered in an audio recording, what type of action is being performed in a video, what the topic of a news article is, what the overall sentiment of a tweet is, or whether a dot in an X-ray is a tumor.

Labels can be obtained by having humans make judgments about a given piece of unlabeled data. Labeled data is significantly more expensive to obtain than the raw unlabeled data.

The quality of labeled data directly influences the performance of supervised machine learning models in operation, as these models learn from the provided labels.

== Crowdsourced labeled data ==
In 2006, Fei-Fei Li, the co-director of the Stanford Human-Centered AI Institute, initiated research to improve the artificial intelligence models and algorithms for image recognition by significantly enlarging the training data. The researchers downloaded millions of images from the World Wide Web and a team of undergraduates started to apply labels for objects to each image. In 2007, Li outsourced the data labeling work on Amazon Mechanical Turk, an online marketplace for digital piece work. The 3.2 million images that were labeled by more than 49,000 workers formed the basis for ImageNet, one of the largest hand-labeled database for outline of object recognition.

== Automated data labelling ==
After obtaining a labeled dataset, machine learning models can be applied to the data so that new unlabeled data can be presented to the model and a likely label can be guessed or predicted for that piece of unlabeled data.

== Challenges ==
=== Data-driven bias ===
Algorithmic decision-making is subject to programmer-driven bias as well as data-driven bias. Training data that relies on bias labeled data will result in prejudices and omissions in a predictive model, despite the machine learning algorithm being legitimate. The labeled data used to train a specific machine learning algorithm needs to be a statistically representative sample to not bias the results. For example, in facial recognition systems underrepresented groups are subsequently often misclassified if the labeled data available to train has not been representative of the population,. In 2018, a study by Joy Buolamwini and Timnit Gebru demonstrated that two facial analysis datasets that have been used to train facial recognition algorithms, IJB-A and Adience, are composed of 79.6% and 86.2% lighter skinned humans respectively.

=== Human error and inconsistency ===
Human annotators are prone to errors and biases when labeling data. This can lead to inconsistent labels and affect the quality of the data set. The inconsistency can affect the machine learning model's ability to generalize well.

=== Domain expertise ===
Certain fields, such as legal document analysis or medical imaging, require annotators with specialized domain knowledge. Without the expertise, the annotations or labeled data may be inaccurate, negatively impacting the machine learning model's performance in a real-world scenario.

== See also ==
- Data annotation
- Humans in the Loop (film)
