= Edwin Chen =

American billionaire businessman

- Born: 1987 or 1988 (age 38–39)
- Education: Massachusetts Institute of Technology
- Known for: founder and CEO of Surge AI

Edwin Chen (born 1987 or 1988) is an American billionaire businessman, and the founder and CEO of Surge AI.

== Biography ==
Born circa 1988, Chen is the son of Taiwanese immigrants to the US His parents ran a Chinese-Thai-American restaurant in the small town of Crystal River, Florida, and Chen worked at the family restaurant before his boarding school education as a teenager. He studied mathematics, computer science and linguistics at the Massachusetts Institute of Technology (MIT). He graduated MIT in 2008.

He joined Twitter in late 2011, becoming a data scientist. He oversaw Twitter's spam and health metrics. He worked as a machine-learning engineer at Twitter, Facebook, Dropbox, Google, and Peter Thiel's hedge fund Clarium, before starting Surge AI. In 2020, he relocated from Silicon Valley to Manhattan to found Surge AI as a data-labeling firm, using several million dollars saved from tech jobs as startup funds. As of July 2025, his company provided AI developers such as Google and OpenAI with human contractors to train LLMs.

In 2025, he was named on of the 100 Most Influential People in AI by TIME. In September 2025, Forbes ranked him as the wealthiest new entry onto the Forbes 400. He remained the CEO and majority owner of Surge AI. At the time, Forbes estimated his net worth at US$18 billion, because of his c.75% stake in Surge AI. He lives in Manhattan, New York City.
