= Vaishnavi Dhanraj =

Indian television actress (born 1988)

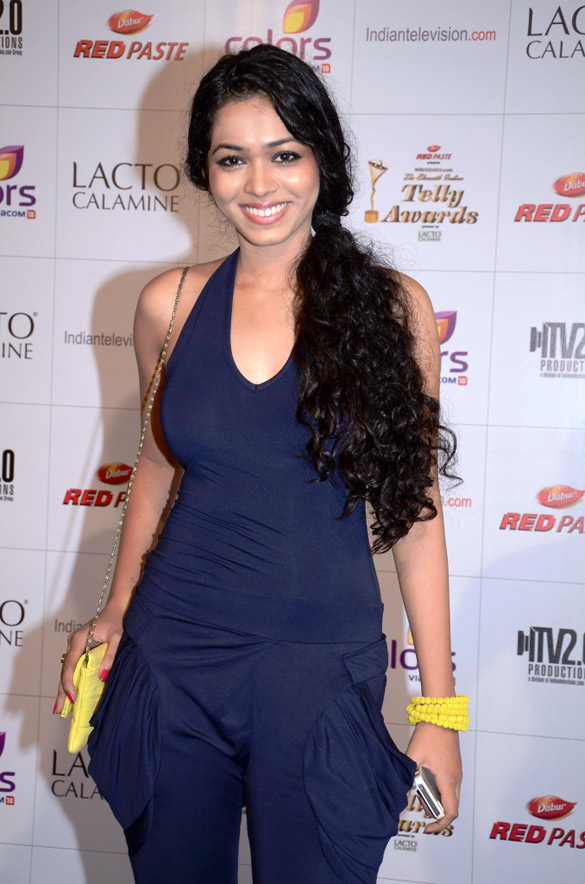
- Born: Vaishnavi Bhoyar; 25 August 1988 (age 38); Nagpur, Maharashtra, India
- Occupations: Actress, Model
- Years active: 2007–2023
- Known for: CID; Na Aana Is Des Laado; Navrangi Re!
- Height: 5 ft 4 in (1.63 m)
- Spouse: Nitin Sahrawat (m. 2012; div. 2016)
- Parent: Dhanraj Bhoyar (father)
- Relatives: Shantanu Bhoyar (brother)

Vaishnavi Dhanraj (born 25 August 1988) is an Indian television and film actress. Best known for playing Inspector Tasha in Sony Entertainment Television's CID, she was the protagonist in PK Lele A Salesman, an adult Hindi film in the sex comedy genre, in which she played the role of a rich girl called Mary Marlo. She has also acted as Nirbhaya in Satyagraha on Aaj Tak, Jahnvi in Na Aana Is Des Laado, Maya Thakur in Begusarai and Mahi Arora in Colors TV's Bepannah.

== Early life ==
Vaishnavi was born in Nagpur and did her schooling from Blind Relief Association's Mundle High School. After she graduated from Shivaji Science College, her family shifted to Kalyan in 2008. Vaishnavi's parents encouraged her artistic inclination and escorted her to her initial auditions. She was known as Vaishnavi Bhoyar during her student years.

== Career ==
Vaishnavi started her acting career in 2007 with a cameo in Kasautii Zindagii Kay. Taking note of her work in this show, the production house offered her the parallel lead in Karam Apnaa Apnaa in the same year. After acting in these two shows with the name Vaishnavi Bhoyar, she replaced her surname with her father's first name, Dhanraj, due to numerological reasons. In June 2009, Vaishnavi joined CID (Episode 570) as a gun-toting detective named Inspector Tasha. For this show, Vaishnavi refused stunt doubles and performed all her stunts herself. CID launched her stardom and she became widely popular as Tasha. She was last seen in CID in Episode 678 as her character Tasha was murdered on duty. Before acting as Tasha, she also acted as Natalya in Episode 538 of CID

Her feisty performance in CID was instrumental in her winning the main protagonist's role in Na Aana Is Des Laado when the show took a time leap of 18 years in December 2010. Vaishnavi played the character of Jhanvi, a feminist who fights for women's empowerment in rural India. In early 2012, Vaishnavi contemplated leaving Na Aana Is Des Laado and rejoining CID as she was dissatisfied with her role but the issue was settled amicably and she continued being a part of Laado until it ended in July 2012. Na Aana Is Des Laado was based on the issue of female foeticide.

After a brief hiatus following her marriage, Vaishnavi returned to television with Parvarrish – Kuchh Khattee Kuchh Meethi on Sony T.V in May 2013. She played the character of Meera Mathur, an immaculate and tranquil businesswoman, which was quite different from her previous roles. The show ended in August 2013, following which Vaishnavi was offered the main antagonist's role in Colors TV's Madhubala – Ek Ishq Ek Junoon. Her dramatic entry scene in the show featured a stunt sequence in which Vaishnavi walked over a tightrope strung over a busy Mumbai street. She played Riya Jaiswal/Devika, a self-obsessed, struggling Bollywood actress. Shortly after her entry, the show took a time leap of a few years, as a result of which Vaishnavi decided to quit the show in January 2014. In 2015, she gained popularity From Playing Maya Mithlesh Thakur In Begusarai (TV series).

Within a week of her exiting Madhubala – Ek Ishq Ek Junoon, Vaishnavi signed up for Star Plus's epic Mahabharat, her first television show in the mythological genre. Initially apprehensive about playing the mythical character of Hidimbaa, she took up the challenge and pulled off a critically acclaimed performance. This character required Vaishnavi to play a double role of an ugly demoness and a stunning enchantress. She later said in an interview that the heavy makeup required for the demoness look took over seven hours to apply, and that the weighty costumes made this shooting schedule one of her most unusual assignments ever. Her stardom and popularity were furthered through this role.

In March 2014, Vaishnavi was approached by Indian news channel Aaj Tak to portray Nirbhaya in the channel's new social awareness series Satyagraha 2014. Aaj Tak's managing editor Supriya Prasad said that their motive was to create a pioneering show on television, and to trigger social change by bringing back Mahatma Gandhi's values of non-violence and the pursuit of truth. Directed by Sunil Manchanda, this series appealed to the nation's conscience. Vaishnavi later said that this role was the most challenging and humbling experience of her career.

Over the years Vaishnavi has also acted in episodic shows including Kitchen Champion 4, India's Got Talent, Crime Patrol, Hum Ne Li Hai- Shapath, and Fear Files.

She was last seen playing the role of Mahi Arora in Colors TV's Bepannaah.

== Personal life ==
On 23 December 2012, Vaishnavi married Indian actor and model Nitin Sahrawat after a year of courtship. The two first met on the set of Nitin's show Kitni Mohabbat Hai Season 2. The ceremony was conducted in Shantikunj, Haridwar according to Vedic rituals. The wedding reception in Mumbai was attended by Vaishnavi's friends and co actors from her shows including Meghna Malik, Kritika Kamra, Dayanand Shetty, Hrishikesh Pandey and Simran Kaur. For their honeymoon the couple backpacked across Western Ghats and stayed in a rustic hut on the Konkan coast for 12 days. The wedding was included in the list of biggest celebrity weddings of the year by the media.

In March 2014 NDTV launched a new channel, NDTV Prime. Nitin and Vaishnavi were the guests for the launch episode of NDTV Prime's The Getaway, in which the two were given a Hyundai Elantra which they then drove down to Kamshet. The theme of this episode being adventure, the couple then paraglided off the challenging Shelar's Site. This episode was shot at their Lokhandwala Complex home and also featured their pet Labrador Retriever Thor.

Sahrawat and Dhanraj filed for legal separation in July 2015 and were divorced in January 2016, opting for a mutual and amicable divorce in Bandra family court. Emotional disconnect was cited as the reason for the parting. In December 2016, a Bollywood gossip website alleged that marital abuse was a reason for the divorce.

== Other work ==
In 2011, Dhanraj wrote several blogs for The Times of India as part of the publication's series of celebrity blogs.

== Filmography ==
=== Films ===
Year	Film	Role	Ref.
2018	Vodka Diaries	Ananya	
2018	PK Lele A Salesman	Mary Marlo	

=== Television ===
Year	Serial	Role	Ref.
2007	Kasautii Zindagii Kay		
2007–2009	Karam Apnaa Apnaa	Aastha Vivan Kapoor	
2008	CID – Qatil Dank	Natalya (Episode 538)	First appearance in CID before joining CID as Inspector Tasha
2009–2010	CID	Inspector Tasha Kumar	
2010–2012	Na Aana Is Des Laado	Jhanvi Sangwan Singh Rana	
2011	Kitchen Champion 4	Contestant	
2012	Crime Patrol	Nisha	
2012	Crime Patrol	Renu Gawde	
2013	SuperCops Vs Super Villains	Nayantara / Sakuna	
2016–2017	SuperCops Vs Super Villains	Supercop Shaina	
2013	Parvarrish – Kuchh Khattee Kuchh Meethi	Meera Siddharth Mathur	
2013	Savdhaan India	Episode 451	
2013	Madhubala – Ek Ishq Ek Junoon	Riya Mehrotra	
2014	Mahabharat	Hidimba	
2014	Satyagraha	Nirbhaya	
2014	The Getaway	Herself	
2015–2016	Begusarai	Maya Mithilesh Thakur	
2016	Beti Ka Farz	Avantika	
2016	Sasural Simar Ka	Kamya Raichand	
2016	Yeh Vaada Raha	Iccha Sengupta	
2017	Savdhaan India	Episode 2142	
2017	Beyhadh	Advocate Pooja Daschandni	
2018	Bepannah	Mahi Arora	
2019	Navrangi Re!	Chitralekha	
2021	Savdhaan India F.I.R.	Inspector (Season 2 – Episode 26)	
2021	Aapki Nazron Ne Samjha	Namrata Rawal Desai	
2023	Tere Ishq Mein Ghayal	Mehak Roy	
