= Well Done CA Sahab! =

2025 Indian Hindi drama film

- Official Poster
- Directed by: Sarvesh Kumar Singh
- Written by: Aaditya Trivedi
- Produced by: Figures and Frames LLP; Indie Productions
- Starring: Gopal Datt; Gaurav Paswala; Jyoti Kapoor; Sayandeep Sengupta; Nishma Soni; Archan Trivedi
- Cinematography: Sree Kumar Nair; Dhrupad Shukla
- Edited by: Sarvesh Kumar Singh
- Music by: Sanchit Balhara; Samiran Das
- Production companies: Figures and Frames LLP
- Distributed by: Cinépolis
- Release date: 27 June 2025
- Running time: 142 minutes
- Country: India
- Language: Hindi

Well Done CA Sahab! is a 2025 Indian Hindi-language drama film directed and edited by Sarvesh Kumar Singh and written by Aaditya Trivedi. The film features Gopal Datt, Gaurav Paswala, Jyoti Kapoor, Sayandeep Sengupta and Nishma Soni in lead roles. The film is produced by Figures and Frames LLP in association with Indie Productions. The film is noted for being among the first Indian feature films to focus on the lives of chartered accountancy (CA) students. It was theatrically released across India on 27 June 2025.

== Plot ==
Three CA aspirants Vidyasagar, Siddharth and Mithila once thrived under the guidance of their inspiring mentor Bhaskar Sharma, who taught them not just accountancy but also life through theatre. Years later, lost in their own struggles, they embark on a journey to find the teacher who once shaped their path but mysteriously vanished.

== Cast ==
- Gopal Datt as CA Bhaskar Sharma
- Gaurav Paswala as Vidyasagar Shastri
- Jyoti Kapoor as Mithila
- Sayandeep Sengupta as Siddharth Shah
- Nishma Soni as Kirti
- Archan Trivedi as Gopaldas Shastri
- Makrand Shukla as CA Ajit Shah
- Samar Jajoriya as Twin Brother
- Sam Jajoriya as Twin Brother
- Rama Krishna Dixit as Sreekant

== Soundtrack ==
Well Done CA Sahab!

Studio album by Mukt
- Released: 2025
- Recorded: 2024–2025
- Genre: Feature film soundtrack
- Length: 12:23
- Language: Hindi
- Labels: Figures and Frames LLP
External audio
- Well Done C.A Sahab! Full Album on YouTube Music

=== Tracklist ===
All lyrics are written by Raaj Kothari; all music is composed by Mukt.

No.	Title	Lyrics	Music	Singer(s)	Length
1.	"Khwabdariyaan"	Raaj Kothari	Mukt	Shaan	3:18
2.	"Sapno Ka Signature"	Raaj Kothari	Mukt	Udit Bhavsar	2:42
3.	"Maiyaa"	Raaj Kothari	Mukt	Shraddha Hattangady	2:55
4.	"Well Done CA Sahab"	Raaj Kothari	Mukt	Suraj Chauhan, Tarun Gagdekar	2:05
5.	"Gurubrahma"	Raaj Kothari	Mukt	Vivek Nayi	1:23
Total length:					12:23

== Production ==
The film was primarily shot on location in Ahmedabad, Gujarat, and nearby areas. The city's academic and urban settings were used to reflect the real-life environment of Chartered Accountancy students in India.

== Marketing and Releases ==
The official trailer was released on 17 June 2025 across YouTube and various social media platforms. The film was theatrically released on 27 June 2025, coinciding with Ratha Yatra.

== See also ==
- List of Hindi films of 2025
- Lists of Hindi films
