= Surge AI =

American data annotation company

Surge Labs Inc.
- Trade name: Surge AI
- Type: Private
- Industry: Information technology
- Founded: 2020; 6 years ago
- Founders: Edwin Chen
- Headquarters: San Francisco, California, United States
- Key people: Edwin Chen (CEO)
- Revenue: $1.2 billion (2024)
- Number of employees: 110 (2025)
- Subsidiaries: Get Hybrid; Task Up; Data Annotation
- Website: www.surgehq.ai

Surge Labs Inc., doing business as Surge AI, is an American multinational data annotation company based in San Francisco, California. Surge focuses on reinforcement learning from human feedback (RLHF), RL environments, and annotating language data. Customers include Anthropic, OpenAI, Google, Microsoft, Meta, and U.S. Army Their diverse workforce includes Goldman Sachs Analysts, Stanford Researchers, and U.S Navy SEALs. The company has been described as likely being one of the most successful data labeling companies in the world.

== History ==
Edwin Chen founded Surge AI in 2020, inspired by dissatisfaction with the quality of crowdsourced data labeling. As of June 2025, Surge had been bootstrapped solely by Chen, with no previous external funding.

Early projects had focused on search, recommendation engines, and content moderation. For data labeling, they developed a platform to match annotators to their expertise. These annotators reviewed the responses by generative AI models, including chatbots and text-to-image models, improving the model outputs by sharing information reflecting the annotators' expertise.

In 2025, the company worked with about 1 million annotators. Surge has never raised outside investment but in July 2025, Surge was in talks with investors from Andreessen Horowitz, Warburg Pincus and TPG Inc. By July 2025, its valuation had ranged from $15 billion to $25 billion. In September 2025, Chen remained the CEO and majority owner of Surge AI, with a 75% stake.

== Sub-platforms and Controversies ==
The Verge and New York Magazine reported in 2023 that Surge AI appeared to own multiple separate platforms for work, including Get Hybrid, Task Up, and Data Annotation.

The Data Annotation platform has been criticized for its lack of transparency regarding its ownership and unexplained annotator account cancellations. In May 2025, Surge AI faced a class action lawsuit that the company "deliberately" misclassified its data annotators as independent contractors, denying them employee benefits and improperly withholding wages.

In July 2025, two documents from Surge AI had been leaked, one on model training and safety guidelines, and another on websites that contractors training Anthropic models were and were not allowed to use.
