= Detective Boomrah =

- Detective Boomrah first look
- First appearance: Shatir Serial Killer
- Created by: Sudhanshu Rai

In-universe information
- Gender: Male
- Nationality: Indian

Detective Boomrah is a fictional detective created by Indian storyteller Sudhanshu Rai. The genre of stories featuring Detective Boomrah is usually suspenseful and thriller. Detective Boomrah first surfaced in the seven-minute-long mystery, and has since appeared in over 50 Sudhanshu stories. Sudhanshu Rai also made a web series titled “Detective Boomrah” based on this popular character.

== Character’s biography ==
Unlike other traditional detectives, Boomrah takes up cases that are supernatural, paranormal and beyond the realms of reality. He is a suave, social young man, who does not don a deerstalker nor does he smoke a pipe.

Other most popular stories by Detective Boomrah include The Killer, Horror of the Nuambi Village, The Mysterious Mrs Macbethy, The Missing Mr Kwatrochi and The Invisible Man, among others.

== Web series ==
Sudhanshu has directed a web series titled Detective Boomrah wherein he also played the titular role. The first episode of the series was premiered on YouTube on January 21, 2022, following which the first season of the series comprising three episodes was released on MX Player.

== Stories ==
- The Missing Mr Kwatrochi
- The Ghost Man
- The Invisible Man
- Horror of the Nuambi Village
- The Killer
- The Missing Hour
- The Dark House
- The End of the World
