= Mujhe Kucch Kehna Hai =

2001 Indian film by Satish Kaushik

- Theatrical release poster
- Directed by: Satish Kaushik
- Screenplay by: Bholu Khan; Aman Jaffery; Rumi Jaffery
- Based on: Tholi Prema by A. Karunakaran
- Produced by: Vashu Bhagnani
- Starring: Tusshar Kapoor; Kareena Kapoor; Rinke Khanna
- Cinematography: Johny Lal
- Edited by: Sanjay Verma
- Music by: Anu Malik; Vishal-Shekhar
- Distributed by: Pooja Entertainment
- Release date: 25 May 2001
- Country: India
- Language: Hindi
- Budget: ₹70 million
- Box office: ₹309.9 million

Mujhe Kucch Kehna Hai (transl. I Have to Say Something) is a 2001 Indian Hindi-language romantic comedy film directed by Satish Kaushik and produced by Vashu Bhagnani. The film was the debut performance of Tusshar Kapoor, who starred alongside Kareena Kapoor. The film was an official remake of the 1998 Telugu film Tholi Prema. It was released on 25 May 2001.

== Plot ==
The story follows Karan Sharma, a sensitive young man who frequently skips college. Although he performs poorly academically, he is highly talented, particularly as a musician and member of a band. His father's constant disappointment causes Karan to have frequent outbursts of frustration and anger. One day, on a deserted street, he sees Pooja Saxena for the first time and immediately falls in love with her. He searches extensively for her but cannot find her, gradually losing hope. He eventually stops playing music and decides to move to another city with his uncle.

On the journey, Karan's car breaks down, forcing him to hitch a ride. To his surprise, Pooja is driving the car. As they introduce themselves, a truck crashes into them, sending the car into a ravine. Karan and Pooja are left hanging from a cliff. Karan manages to pull Pooja to safety, but loses his grip and falls into the ravine.

== Cast ==
- Tusshar Kapoor as Karan Sharma
- Kareena Kapoor as Pooja Saxena
- Dalip Tahil as Krishna Sharma
- Amrish Puri as Subedar Balram Singh
- Rinke Khanna as Priya Saluja
- Vrajesh Hirjee as Chinku
- Alok Nath as Rana Virendra Pratap Singh
- Dinesh Hingoo
- Himani Shivpuri as Sushma Dhupia
- Yashpal Sharma as Batsman/gang leader
- Hemant Pandey as Dabbu
- Gopal Datt as Hrithik
- Darshan Kumar

== Soundtrack ==
Mujhe Kucch Kehna Hai

Soundtrack album by Anu Malik and Vishal-Shekhar
- Released: April 2001
- Genre: Feature film soundtrack
- Length: 65:08
- Label: Tips Music

Anu Malik composed the soundtrack while Sameer penned the lyrics. According to the Indian trade website Box Office India, with around 32,00,000 units sold, this film's soundtrack album was the year's second highest-selling. The album was released in April 2001

Rehna Hai Tere Dil Mein which was composed by Vishal-Shekhar and sung by Shekhar. The film version of that song was sung by Babul Supriyo and Vishal Dadlani penned the lyrics. A remix version of Rabba mere Rabba was remixed by DJ khalif. These two songs were added as bonus tracks in the cassette which was released in February 2002

=== Track listing ===
All lyrics are written by Sameer; all music is composed by Anu Malik.

Original Track list
No.	Title	Singer(s)	Length
1.	"Maine Koyi Jadoo"	Preeti & Pinky, Babul Supriyo
2.	"Jabse Dekha Hai"	Babul Supriyo, Alka Yagnik
3.	"Rabba Mere Rabba"	Sonu Nigam, Srinivas
4.	"Mujhe Kucch Kehna Hai" (Raga Shivaranjani)	KK, Anu Malik, Chorus, Sudesh Bhosle
5.	"Dupatta Mera"	Anuradha Sriram
6.	"Pyaar Re"	KK
7.	"Jabse Dekha Hai"	Alka Yagnik
8.	"Guncha Hai Gul Hai (Note: The track "Guncha Hai Gul Hai" was not included in the theatrical film as well as DVD Home Media.)"	Sonu Nigam, Zubeen Garg, Raageshwari

Bonus Track list
No.	Title	Lyrics	Music	Singer(s)	Length
9.	"Rehna Hai Tere Dil Mein"	Vishal Dadlani	Vishal-Shekhar	Shekhar
10.	"Rabba Mere Rabba" (Remix)	Sameer	Anu Malik	Sonu Nigam, Srinivas
11.	"Rehna Hai Tere Dil Mein" (Film version)	Vishal Dadlani	Vishal-Shekhar	Babul Supriyo

== Awards ==
Filmfare Awards 2002

- Best Music Director, Anu Malik, Nominated
- Best Male Debut, Tusshar Kapoor, Won

Star Screen Awards 2002

- Best Music Director, Anu Malik, Nominated
- Best Male Playback, Sonu Nigam, Nominated
- Best Story, Rumi Jaffery
- Most Promising Newcomer – Male, Tusshar Kapoor, Nominated

Zee Cine Awards 2002

- Best Male Debut, Tusshar, Won
- Best Actor in a Comic Role, Vrajesh Hirjee, Nominated
- Best Music Director, Anu Malik, Nominated

== Sequel ==
A sequel to the film was announced in 2011, however it never went into production.
