= Rasa (film) =

- Theatrical release poster
- Directed by: Angith Jayaraj; Preetish Jayaraj
- Written by: Rutuja Patil
- Produced by: Angith Jayaraj; Preetish Jayaraj; Rutuja Patil
- Starring: Shishir Sharma; Rishi Bissa; Vishishtha Chawla
- Cinematography: Angith Jayaraj; Preetish Jayaraj
- Edited by: Angith Jayaraj; Preetish Jayaraj
- Music by: Nick Montopoli
- Production companies: Purnam Films; Indian Summer Films; Haroon Rashid Films; Vidya Entertainment
- Distributed by: Cinepolis
- Release date: 25 July 2025
- Country: India
- Language: Hindi

Rasa is a 2025 Indian Hindi‑language culinary drama film directed by Angith Jayaraj and Preetish Jayaraj. Produced by Purnam Films, Indian Summer Films, Haroon Rashid Films and Vidya Entertainment, it stars Shishir Sharma, Rishi Bissa, Vishishtha Chawla and Rajiv Kumar. The story follows an aspiring chef who apprentices with a celebrated kitchen head whose dishes are said to evoke specific emotions in diners.

== Plot ==
Varun (Rishi Bissa), an aspiring chef, secures an apprenticeship at Ananta, a restaurant headed by Chef Ananth Nair (Shishir Sharma). The kitchen operates with a small team and strict routines. As Varun learns the house methods, he observes unusual practices linked to dishes reputed to elicit specific emotional responses. His experience leads him to consider the ethical implications of affecting diners’ feelings through cuisine and the personal costs of the techniques employed.

== Cast ==
- Shishir Sharma as Chef Ananth Nair
- Rishi Bissa as Varun
- Vishishtha Chawla as Meera
- Rajiv Kumar as Tejas Desai
- Srideep Bhattacharya as Siddharth

== Reception ==
The Times of India rated the film 3/5, noting "‘Rasa’ is a commendable attempt at a concept-driven feature that breaks away from the formulaic. It may not be visually dazzling or packed with stylised elements or songs, but it leans on the strength of storytelling, a haunting background score, and strong performances. Above all, it’s an acquired taste—but one worth sampling." Film Information wrote "On the whole, Rasa is an average fare but lack of awareness and promotion will tell on its box-office performance so much that it will be remembered as a non-starter."

== See also ==
- List of Hindi films of 2025
