= Mission Grey House =

2025 Indian Hindi-language suspense thriller film

- Theatrical release poster
- Directed by: Naushad Siddiqui
- Written by: Zeba K
- Screenplay by: Naushad Siddiqui
- Story by: Zeba K
- Produced by: Rafat Films Entertainment
- Starring: Abeer Khan; Rajesh Sharma; Nikhat Khan; Kamlesh Sawant; Kiran Kumar; Puja Sharma
- Cinematography: Aamir Lal
- Edited by: Ashfaq Makrani
- Music by: H Roy
- Production companies: Reliance Entertainment; Rafat Films Entertainment
- Release date: 17 January 2025
- Running time: 117 minutes
- Country: India
- Language: Hindi

Mission Grey House is a 2025 Indian suspense thriller film released in theatres on 17 January 2025.

== Plot ==
A boy dreams of becoming a police officer by any means necessary. Struggling with poverty, he wears a police uniform on his own and begins confronting criminals. His journey takes a dangerous turn when he enters Grey House, where he becomes trapped and must face unexpected consequences.

== Cast ==
- Abeer Khan as Kabeer Rathod
- Puja Sharma as Kiara
- Rajesh Sharma as Yashpal Singh
- Kiran Kumar as Vikrant Rana
- Nikhat Khan as Rekha
- Kamlesh Sawant as Gaitonde
- Raza Murad as Lala Seth
- Hemant Choudhary
- Babloo Mukerjee
- Arslan
- Zoya

== Production ==
The film is produced under the banner of Rafat Films Entertainment and presented by Reliance Entertainment. It is directed by Naushad Siddiqui, with a story written by Zeba K and screenplay and dialogues by Naushad Siddiqui and A. H. Siddiqui. The music is composed by H Roy, with lyrics by Amitab Ranjan and Ravi Yadav. Action sequences were choreographed by Abbas Ali Mughal.

Principal photography took place in Lonavala and Pune.
