= Kaisi Ye Paheli =

2025 Indian Hindi language film

- Poster
- Directed by: Ananyabrata Chakravorty
- Written by: Ananyabrata Chakravorty
- Produced by: Nishu Dikshit, Take Pictures
- Starring: Sukant Goel; Sadhana Singh; Chittaranjan Giri; Rajit Kapur
- Cinematography: Leena Patoli
- Edited by: Prakhar Khare
- Release date: 28 November 2025
- Running time: 101 minutes
- Country: India
- Language: Hindi

Kaisi Ye Paheli (English: A Mother, a Son, and a Murder) is a 2025 Indian Hindi-language murder mystery and dark comedy film written and directed by Ananyabrata Chakravorty. The film stars Sukant Goel, Sadhana Singh, Rajit Kapur, and Chittaranjan Giri. Produced by Nishu Dikshit and Take Pictures, it premiered at the New York Indian Film Festival on 21 June 2025, where it received nominations for Best Screenplay and Best Debut Feature. On November 21 2025, the film won Best Director - Indian at the Yellowstone International Film Festival. On November 02 2026, the film won Best Screenplay at the Asian Film Festival Barcelona in the Otras Narrativas section. It had a limited theatrical release in India on November 28, 2025.

== Plot ==
In the quiet hill town of Shottipur in northeast India, Ma, a warm and well-read sixty-year-old widow, lives with her son Uttam, a cop. Though they share a home, Uttam is emotionally distant and often dismissive and disrespectful towards her. Since his father's death in the line of duty, he has kept his mother at arm's length, rebuffing every attempt she makes to reconnect with him.

When a nineteen-year-old student is found murdered, Ma begins helping with the investigation. Though Uttam mocks her involvement, she impresses his senior officer, Tamang, by exposing flaws in their investigation and is brought on to the case.

As the investigation grows more complex, political pressure mounts to close the case quickly. Then a second murder, involving someone close to Ma, makes the case deeply personal. When veteran detective Bondo sidelines her, Ma continues the investigation on her own, putting her life at risk, as she becomes increasingly determined to uncover the truth and find a way back to her son.

== Cast ==
- Sukant Goel as Uttam
- Sadhana Singh as Uttam's mother
- Rajit Kapur as Detective Bondo
- Chittaranjan Giri as Tamang
- Rahul Mukhia as Gogoi
- Nishu Dikshit as Rasika
- Rinchen Sherpa as Limbu
- Bindhiya Dhamala as Jhini
- Rajendra Maskey as Pradhan
- Ujjaini Deb as Sanjukta
- Rohit Karmakar as Shamik
- Den Sherpa as Moyur

== Reception ==
Baradwaj Rangan called it a "delicious murder mystery that grows quietly on you, and then hits you on the head with a hammer" and added that "The performances are perfect, and they are even better when you think back about the movie."

Devesh Sharma of Filmfare gave it a 3.5/5 rating and quoted "The film uses its atmospheric setting as both canvas and catalyst for a mystery steeped in emotional undercurrents.” "

Sreeparna Sengupta of The Times of India gave it 3.5/5 stars and called it "A moody murder mystery amidst the mist and mountains - soaked with intrigue, examining relationship definitions and a twist you don't see coming.."

Shubhra Gupta of The Indian Express said that "There are a couple of interesting elements in here, chief of them being the strained mother-son relationship, which spirals after the death of the father."

Debiparna Chakraborty of Outlook India have it 3.5/5 and said that "While its leisurely pace and a few narrative gaps might test the patience of viewers seeking a fast-paced thriller, Kaisi Ye Paheli succeeds as a character-driven drama wrapped in a mystery. It works best if you approach it not as a gripping race against time, but as a cosy, atmospheric portrait of grief, love, and the complex secrets families keep."

The airborne rights to the film were acquired by Panorama Studios Inflight, and the film is now available as a part of inflight entertainment in ten airlines across the world.

== Key Festivals and Laurels ==
Year	Festival	Category	Nominee	Result
2025	New York Indian Film Festival	Best Screenplay	Ananyabrata Chakravorty	Nominated
2025	New York Indian Film Festival	Best Debut Film	Kaisi Ye Paheli	Nominated
2025	Yellowstone International Film Festival	Best Director - Indian	Ananyabrata Chakravorty	Won
2025	Yellowstone International Film Festival	Best Film	Kaisi Ye Paheli	Nominated
2026	Dehancer Colorist Awards, London	Best Colorist	Mujahid Khan	Nominated
2026	Asian Film Festival Barcelona	Best Screenplay	Ananyabrata Chakravorty	Won
