= Gopal Datt =

Indian actor and writer

- Born: Nainital
- Occupations: Actor, writer
- Years active: 2001–present

Gopal Datt is an Indian actor and writer. His full name is Gopal Datt Tiwari. Gopal Datt started as theater artist in 1999 until he got first starring role in Mujhe Kucch Kehna Hai. He also went on to star in the blockbuster Tere Naam, Samrat & Co. and the National Award-winning Filmistaan.

== Early life ==
Gopal Datt was born in Nainital and finished high School in Nainital. He graduated with B.Sc. (Chemistry). After his graduation, Gopal enrolled into the National School of Drama (NSD) Delhi passing out in 1999. He acted in many stage dramas like Shakespearean Italian to Parsi. His favorite theater director is B.V. Karanth.

== Career ==
After finishing acting course, Gopal Dutt moved to Mumbai from Delhi. He got first break in the film Mujhe Kucch Kehna Hai (2001). After that he played supporting roles in Tere Naam, in Kaushik Ghatak's 2014 film Samrat & Co., and in the national award-winning film Filmistaan. He also became the jury member in a film festival. Gopal has worked in many web series and he has been actively involved with the TVF since a very long time. He played a major role in Arre’s Official Chukyagiri and Voot’s Badman. He is also known for his comedic roles in various YouTube videos created by AIB.

== Filmography ==
=== Films ===
Year	Title	Role	Notes
2001	Mujhe Kucch Kehna Hai	Hrithik	
2003	Tere Naam	Chandar	
2013	Filmistaan	Jawaad	
2014	Samrat & Co.	Chakradhar Pandey	
2016	Daughter	Father	Short
2017	Shubh Mangal Saavdhan	Veterinary Doctor	
2018	Love per Square Foot	Pappu Mama	
2019	Jabariya Jodi	Inspector Tiwari	
2019	Line of Descent	Arun, an undercover agent	Released on ZEE5
2020	Shubh Mangal Zyada Saavdhan	Doctor	
2021	Bunty Aur Babli 2	IT Officer Nand Kishore	
2024	Wild Wild Punjab	Gaurav's Father	
2025	Well Done CA Sahab!	CA Bhaskar Sharma	

=== Television ===
Year	Title	Role	Notes	Ref.
2006	Godaan			
2006	The Week That Wasn't			
2015	TVF Pitchers	Rastogi	Web series	TVF Play
2016	TVF Bachelors	Dr. Aashiq Mastana	Web series	TVF Play
2016	Official Chukyagiri		Web series	Arre
2018	Official CEOgiri	Janitor Chacha	Web series	Arre
2018	Comedy High School			
2018	Dhatt Tere Ki		Web Series	ZEE5
2019	Delhi Crime	Sudhir Kumar	Web Series	Netflix
2019	The Office	T.P. Mishra	Web series	Hotstar Specials
2020	Wakaalat From Home	Lobo Tripathi, Lawyer	Web series	Amazon Prime Video
2020	A Simple Murder	Amit Mehta	Web series	Sony Liv
2021	Kathmandu Connection	Hitesh	Web series	Sony Liv
2021	Candy	Head Master Thomas	Web series	Voot
2021	Chakravyuh	Forensic Doctor	Web series	MX Player
2022	Jugaadistan	Nadeem Dalvi	Web series	Lionsgate Play
2022	London Files	Gopi	Web Series	Voot
2023	Kaalkoot	SHO Jagdish Sahay	Web Series	JioCinema
2024	Aap Ka Apna Zakir	Gopal Datt	TV program	Sony Entertainment Television
2026	Space Gen: Chandrayaan	Rakesh Mohanty	Web Series	JioHotstar
2026	Gullak	Pinky Mama	Web Series	SonyLIV
