= The Rabbit House =

Indian thriller suspense film

- Theatrical release poster
- Directed by: Vaibhav Kulkarni
- Written by: Vaibhav Kulkarni
- Screenplay by: Vaibhav Kulkarni
- Story by: Vaibhav Kulkarni
- Produced by: Sunita Pandhare, Krishna Pandhare
- Starring: Amit Riyaan; Karishma; Padmanabh; Gagan Pradeep; Preeti Sharma; Suresh Kumbhar
- Cinematography: Pratik Pathak
- Edited by: Vaibhav Kulkarni
- Music by: Padmanabh Gaikwad
- Production company: Geetai Productions
- Release date: 3 January 2025
- Running time: 133 minutes
- Country: India
- Language: Hindi

The Rabbit House is a 2025 Indian Hindi-language thriller suspense film written and directed by Vaibhav Kulkarni. It is produced by Sunita Pandhare and Krishna Pandhare under Geetai Productions.

It features Amit Riyaan, Karishma, Padmanabh, Gagan Pradeep, Preeti Sharma, and Suresh Kumbhar as main cast.

The music was composed by Padmanabh Gaikwad with editing by Vaibhav Kulkarni and cinematography by Pratik Pathak.

== Plot ==
"The Rabbit House" narrates the heartbreaking story of a newlywed woman striving for emancipation from a stifling marriage with a spouse afflicted with OCD. The narrative prompts contemplation over the locus of her liberation—whether it resides in existence or in demise. Set against the picturesque landscape of Himachal Pradesh, the film delicately intertwines aspects of mystery and romance. The narrative adeptly explores the intricacies of relationships, mental health, and societal norms. The film's title, "The Rabbit House," possesses symbolic significance, implying that the protagonist's pursuit of freedom may reflect the elusive characteristics of a rabbit's burrow. The magnificent landscapes of Himachal Pradesh function not merely as a visual backdrop but also as a vital component of the narrative, enhancing the story with cultural subtleties. "The Rabbit House" offers a captivating narrative, engaging characters, and exquisite images, ensuring a cinematic experience that surpasses traditional storytelling limits.

== Cast ==
- Amit Riyaan
- Karishma
- Padmanabh
- Gagan Pradeep
- Preeti Sharma
- Suresh Kumbhar
- Purva
- Sujata Mogal
- Yogesh Kulkarni
- Swara Kulkarni

== Production ==
The film was shot in The Rabbit House, a 120-year-old heritage property situated in Himachal Pradesh, India. As its name suggests, the house comprises 16-17 distinct interconnected chambers, creating a labyrinthine layout akin to a rabbit's burrow. This architectural masterpiece functions as both the principal backdrop and a key character in the Hindi feature film The Rabbit House. The filmmakers employed this historic home as a fundamental element of the narrative, intertwining its rich background with the scenario.

== Theatre Release ==
The Rabbit House was supposed to release on 20 December 2024, but due to the presence of many big films it is postponed to release on 3 January 2025.

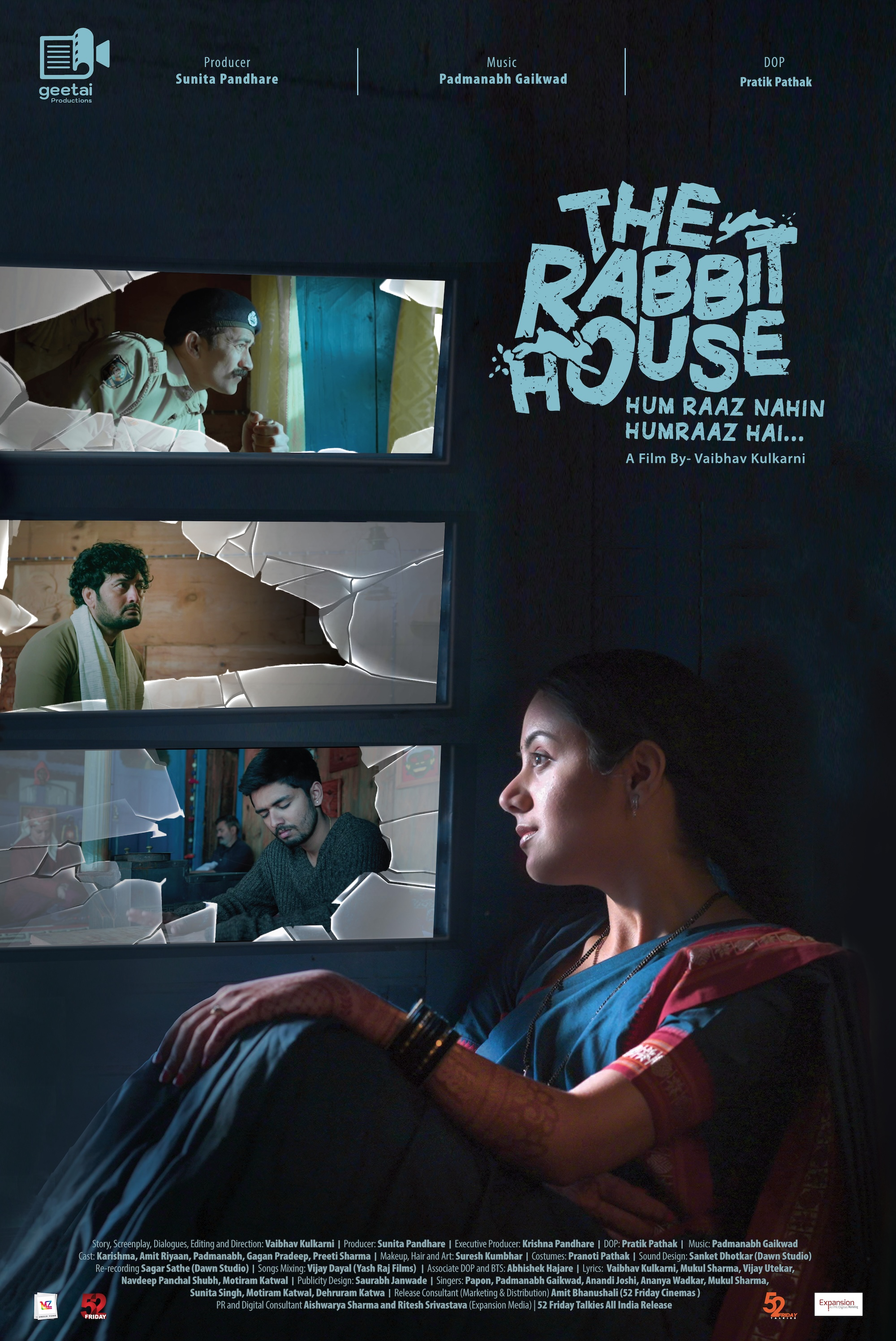
The Rabbit House's first poster

== OTT Release ==
After its theatrical run and festival screenings, The Rabbit House was released for digital streaming on Prasar Bharati’s WAVES OTT platform on 5 February. The film became available to audiences across the globe through the public broadcaster’s OTT service.

== Reception ==
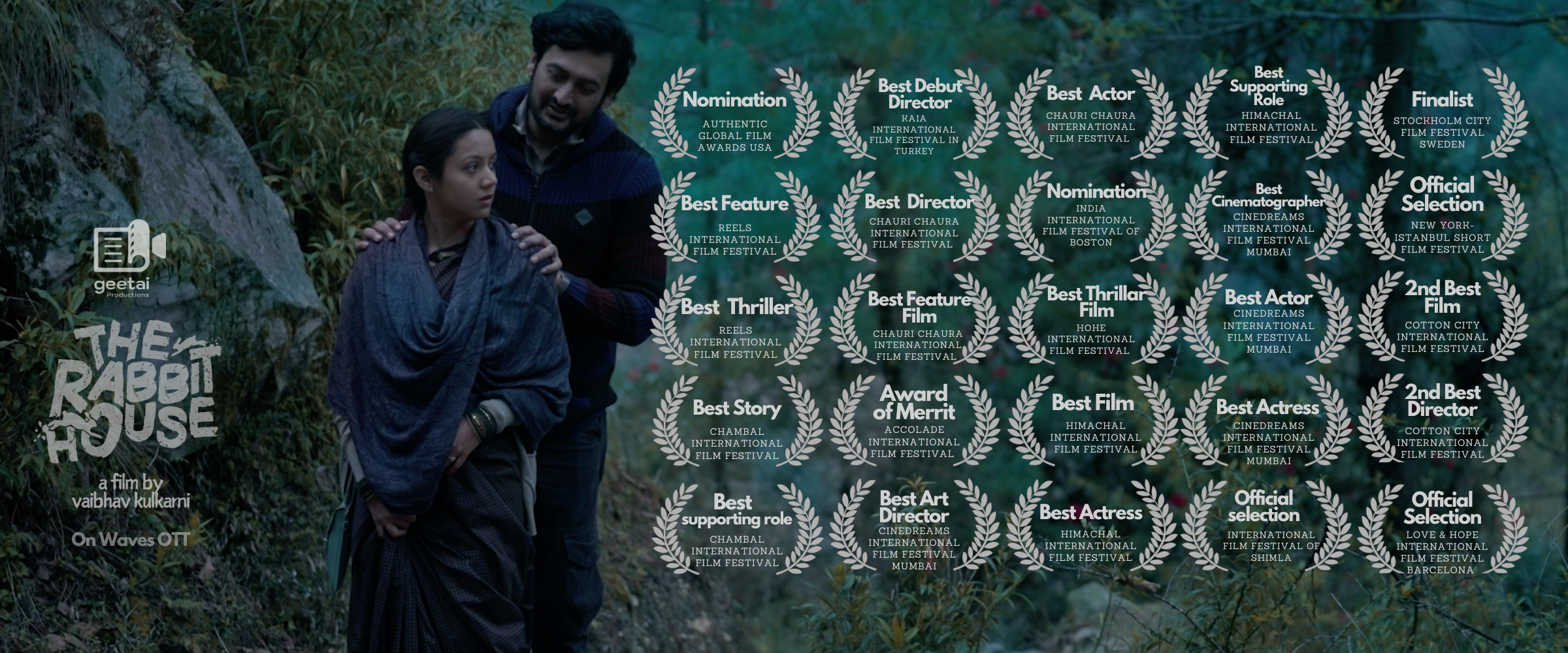
'The Rabbit House' Received 25 international awards.

The film received a mix response from film critics. The Times of India gave it 2.5 star out of 5. Bru Times gave it 4 stars out of 5.

== Award ==
Himachal International Film Festival Mandi Best Film

Himachal International Film Festival Mandi Best Actress

Himachal International Film Festival Mandi Best supporting role

Accolade International Film Festival California Award of Merit - Feature film

Penzance International Film Festival UK Best Debut Director

Hohe International Film Festival Germany Best Thriller Film

India International Film Festival of Boston Boston Nomination

Chauri Chaura International film festival UP Nomination

International film festival of Shimla Shimla Official selection

Chauri Chaura International film festival UP Best feature film

Chauri Chaura International film festival UP Best Actor

Cinedreames International Film Festival Mumbai Best Actor

Cinedreames International Film Festival Mumbai Best Actress

Cinedreames International Film Festival Mumbai Best Art Director

Cinedreames International Film Festival Mumbai Best Cinematographer

India International Film Festival of Boston Boston Best actor Nomination Padmanabh

Kaia International Film Festival in Turkey! Best Director

Chambal International film festival Gwalior Best Story

Chambal International film festival Gwalior Best supporting role - Gagan Pradeep

Cotton City IFF Akola 2nd best film

Cotton City IFF Akola 2nd best director

Love & Hope International Film Festival Official selection

New York-Istanbul Short Film Festival Official selection

Stockholm City Film Festival Sweden Finalist

Third Eye Asian Film Festival 2024 Mumbai Official selection

FINDECOIN - Independent International Short & Feature Film Festival VENEZUELA Official selection

Authentic Global Film Awards 2025 Los Angelis Nomination
