= Sudhanshu Rai =

Indian film director, actor and storyteller

- Born: Gorakhpur, India
- Education: IBS, Bangalore (MBA, 2008)
- Occupations: Film director, actor, storyteller

Sudhanshu Rai is an Indian film director, actor and storyteller. He is best known for the web series Detective Boomrah and the film Chaipatti.

== Early life ==
Rai was born in Gorakhpur. He pursued his MBA from IBS, Bangalore in 2008.

== Career ==
=== As a filmmaker ===
Rai made his acting and directorial debut in 2021 with Chaipatti, which was premiered on YouTube and subsequently released on OTT platforms Disney+ Hotstar and MX Player. A year later in 2022, he released his first web series Detective Boomrah wherein he was the director and also the lead actor.

=== As a storyteller ===
He began conceiving and narrating stories in 2018 on his official YouTube channel "Kahanikaar Sudhanshu Rai" and in 2020, he started his weekly radio storytelling show, "Kahaniyaan - Kahanikaar Sudhanshu Rai Ke Saath" on ISHQ 104.8 FM. It was during the initial storytelling days that he created the character of "Detective Boomrah", which is now a web series.

Rai created and narrated the Dreamers series, which presents real-life stories of notable personalities. The first episode focused on actor Mukesh Khanna's journey from early struggles to fame through roles like Shaktimaan and Bhishma Pitamah.

== Filmography ==
Year	Movie/Web	Credits	Note
2021	Chaipatti	Director	
2022	Detective Boomrah	Director and actor	
2022	Chintaa Mani	Actor and co-director	
2025	Baida	Actor	

=== Radio show ===
- Kahaniyaan Kahanikaar Sudhanshu Rai Ke Saath (12 episodes)

== Character ==
- Detective Boomrah

== Stories ==
- The Christmas Man
- The Killer
- Bhai Sahab Chale Bangkok
- The Prisoner
- Adhyapak Ram
- Mangu Chitrakaar
- Holi Wala Dost
