= 2020 Delhi =

Upcoming Indian Hindi-language film

- Theatrical release poster
- Directed by: Devendra Malviya
- Written by: Devendra Malviya
- Story by: Devendra Malviya
- Produced by: Nandkishor Malviya; Ashu Malviya; Amit Malviya
- Starring: Samar Jai Singh; Brijendra Kala; Siddharth Bhardwaj; Devendra Malviya; Bhupesh Singh; Vicky Yadav; Amit Jha; Chetan Sharma; Akashdeep Arora; Diksha Asthana
- Cinematography: Kartik Kumar Bhagat
- Edited by: Sayyed Faraaz
- Production company: Midas Touch Films
- Release date: 14 November 2025
- Country: India
- Language: Hindi

2020 Delhi is an Indian Hindi-language feature film released on 14 November 2025. Directed by Devendra Malviya and produced by Nandkishore Malviya, Ashu Malviya, and Amit Malviya, the film is made under the banner of Midas Touch Films. It features an ensemble cast including Brijendra Kala, Samar Jai Singh, Bhupesh Singh, Siddharth Bhardwaj, Devendra Maalviya, Chetan Sharma, Akashdeep Arora, Diksha Asthana, Vicky Yadav, and others. The film is India's first one-shot feature film—shot entirely in a single continuous take.

== Cast ==
- Chetan Sharma as Akshay
- Akashdeep Arora as Javed Mansoori
- Samar Jai Singh as Shabhu Tiwari
- Siddharth Bhardwaj as Sanjay Raaj
- Brijendra Kala as Radheshyam Nasa
- Devendra Maalviya as Sooraj Paal
- Bhupesh Singh as Ahmadullah Khan
- Vicky Yadav as Md. Samad
- Amit Jha as Mangalnath
- Diksha Asthana as Rukhsana

== Plot ==
2020 Delhi unfolds in real-time during the politically and communally volatile days of the Delhi riots of 2020, sparked amid nationwide protests against the Citizenship Amendment Bill (CAB) and heightened global attention during the Namaste Trump event.

As the city descends into chaos, Akshay and Javed, who are from different walks of life, find themselves trapped together in an abandoned factory. They are initially distrustful of each other due to religious differences. They see a local politician, Sanjay Raaj, bringing grenades to the riots. Eventually a police officer confronts the politician.

== Production ==
The film was conceptualized in 2020 and draws inspiration from the real-life events surrounding the Delhi riots of February 2020. It was filmed entirely in Indore, Madhya Pradesh, over a two-month period. The production's most distinctive feature is its execution as a one-shot film, requiring precise choreography and coordination. The film's score is composed by Saurabh Mehta.

== Release ==
2020 Delhi was originally set to release on 2 February 2025, right before the 2025 Delhi Legislative Assembly election but this timing was challenged by Indian National Congress politician Abhishek Singhvi. The movie was rescheduled for release in theatres across India on 14 November 2025.

== Reception ==
Abhishek Srivastava writing for The Times of India said the movie "is more noise than nuance" and gave it 2.5 out of 5 stars.
