= Baida (film) =

Indian science fiction supernatural thriller film

- Theatrical release poster
- Directed by: Puneet Sharma
- Written by: Sudhanshu Rai
- Produced by: Puneet Sharma; Sudhanshu Rai
- Starring: Sudhanshu Rai; Manisha Rai; Shobhit Sujay; Sourabh Raaj Jain; Hiten Tejwani
- Cinematography: Abhishek Modak
- Edited by: Pratheek Shetty
- Release date: 21 March 2025
- Country: India
- Language: Hindi

Baida is a 2025 Indian Hindi-language sci-fi supernatural thriller film directed by Puneet Sharma and written by Sudhanshu Rai. The film features Sudhanshu Rai in the lead role, alongside Manisha Rai, Shobhit Sujay, Sourabh Raaj Jain, Hiten Tejwani and Tarun Khanna in pivotal roles. The film was released theatrically on 21 March 2025.

== Cast ==
- Sudhanshu Rai as Ram Babu
- Manisha Rai
- Shobhit Sujay
- Sourabh Raaj Jain as Pishaach
- Hiten Tejwani
- Tarun Khanna
- Siddharth Banerjee
- Deepak Wadhwa
- Akhlaq Ahmad Azad
- Pradeep Kabra

== Plot ==
A former spy turned salesman while on his sales trip to a rural area in Uttar Pradesh gets entangled in a web of dimensional conspiracy when he decides to take shelter in a cottage of a mysterious Man. His race to death begins when he finds himself transported to the British India and slated to be hanged. The reality seemed distant from him as his world changed in a matter of seconds and now, he must use his spy instincts to save himself and return to the world he belonged.

== Filming ==
The film, described as a sci-fi thriller set in India's Hindi heartland, was primarily filmed in Gorakhpur, Uttar Pradesh, and includes elements of the local Bhojpuri dialect and culture. Local artisans and sculptors were involved in the art department to ensure cultural authenticity. Additional scenes were shot in Delhi. The story follows an assassin and his interactions with various characters and situations.

== Reception ==
Tanmayi Savadi of Times Now gave the film three out of five stars and wrote, "Baida has all the elements that are required to make a supernatural thriller interesting. The duration is a plus point. However, the surface gloss is never erased to explore its full potential." Vineeta Kumar of India Today gave it two-and-a-half out of five stars and wrote, "There's an effort to bring action, comedy and intriguing elements from the supernatural genre, but it doesn't make for a full-blown entertainment package despite all its potential."

Archika Khurana of The Times of India rated the film two-and-a-half out of five stars and wrote, "While Baida boasts a compelling premise, its execution falters in several areas. The film’s low-budget constraints are evident in its choppy editing and overuse of saturated lighting, where red and green hues—intended to enhance the eerie atmosphere—often feel distracting instead." Rishabh Suri of Hindustan Times gave it one out of five stars and wrote, "Sudhanshu Rai's vanity projects fails to be either scary or cutting edge, annoying the viewer with its inefficacy."
