= Vindhya Tiwari =

Indian actress

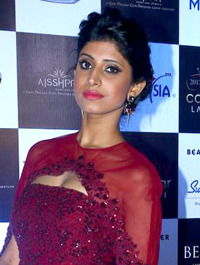
- Tiwari at launch of Telly Calendar 2017
- Born: 22 November 1992 (age 33); Varanasi, Uttar Pradesh, India
- Occupation: Actress
- Years active: 2009–present

Vindhya Tiwari (born 22 November 1992) is an Indian actress who works primarily in Indian television and Indian soap operas. Her breakthrough role was in the drama Agle Janam Mohe Bitiya Hi Kijo on Zee TV n she is best known for her role in Maryada: Lekin Kab Tak? on Star Plus as Vidya for which she got nominated for best television actress in Indian television academy awards ITA. She played the Role of Main Female Antagonist Chandramani in Sasural Simar Ka on Colors TV She also played the lead in Badi Door Se Aaye Hain as Sonachandi on SAB TV.

== Early life ==
Tiwari was born in Ramnagar, in Varanasi district, Uttar Pradesh. She aspired to become an actress at a very young age.

== Television ==
Year(s)	Show	Role	Channel	Notes
2009–11	Agle Janam Mohe Bitiya Hi Kijo	Jamuni	Zee TV	Nominated—Indian Telly Award for Best Actress in a Negative Role
2010	Do Hanson Ka Jodaa	Meera	Imagine TV	
2010–12	Maryada: Lekin Kab Tak?	Vidya Jakhar lead	Star Plus	Nominated-Indian television academy awards ITA for best television actress
2012–13	Mrs. Kaushik Ki Paanch Bahuein	Lovely Karthik Kaushik	Zee TV	Female lead role
2013	Mrs. Pammi Pyarelal	Gayatri Faujdar	Colors TV	Female lead role
2013–15	Bharat Ka Veer Putra – Maharana Pratap	Rani Durgavati	Sony Entertainment Television	Supporting role
2014	Yeh Hai Aashiqui	Megha	Bindass	
2014	Box Cricket League	Herself	Sony Entertainment Television	
2014	Diya Aur Baati Hum	Prema	Star Plus	
2015	Pyaar Tune Kya Kiya	Gayatri	Zing	
2015	Code Red	Ishita	Colors TV	
2015	Phir Bhi Na Maane...Badtameez Dil	Sasha	Star Plus	
2015	Rannbheri	Vijaya	DD National	Female lead role
2015	Sumit Sambhal Lega	Reema	Star Plus	
2016	Badi Door Se Aaye Hain	Sona Chandi Ghotala	SAB TV	Female lead role
2016	Sasural Simar Ka	Princess Chandramani	Colors TV	Main female antagonist
2017	Naagin 2	Queen Takshika of Takshak Clan of shape-shifting serpents	Colors TV	Cameo appearance(negative)
2017	Waaris	Sakshi	&TV	Cameo appearance
2018	Saat Phero Ki Hera Pherie	Sweety	SAB TV	
2018	Half Marriage	Maya Oberoi	&TV	
2018	Khichdi	Kashmira	Star Plus	
2018	Laal Ishq	Urvashi/Bittu	&TV	
2019	Vikram Betaal Ki Rahasya Gatha	Kalika/Jogni	&TV	Cameo appearance(negative)
2020	Kulfi Kumar Bajewala	Chalu ji	Star Plus	Supporting role
2020	Bhakharwadi	Munni Pandey and Aishwarya	Sab TV	Cameo appearance
2020	Maddam Sir	TV Reporter Laveena Khanum	Sab TV	Cameo appearance
2021	Game of Sexes			
2022	Exit	Shailey		

== Filmography ==
Year(s)	Show	Role	Notes	Ref
2022	The Conversion	Sakshi Mishra / Sabiya Sheikh		
2025	The Networker	Ketki		
