= The Networker =

Indian Hindi-language comedy film

- Theatrical release poster
- Directed by: Vikas Kumar Vishwakarma
- Written by: Vikash Malik
- Screenplay by: Vikas Kumar Vishwakarma; Abhinav Pathak
- Story by: Vikash Malik
- Produced by: Vikash Malik; Sharad Malik
- Starring: Vikram Kochhar; Durgesh Kumar; Ishtiyak Khan; Rishabh Pathak; Brijendra Kala; Vindhya Tiwari; Nikhat Khan
- Cinematography: Masco Singh
- Edited by: Deepanshu Chawla
- Music by: Rahul Bhatt; Kalki
- Production companies: Gutargoo Entertainment; Navritu Films
- Distributed by: Master Group
- Release date: 9 May 2025
- Country: India
- Language: Hindi

The Networker is a 2025 Indian Hindi-language comedy film directed by Vikas Kumar Vishwakarma and produced by Vikash Malik and Sharad Malik under the banners Gutargoo Entertainment and Navritu Films. The film stars Vikram Kochhar, Durgesh Kumar, Ishtiyak Khan, Rishabh Pathak, Brijendra Kala, Vindhya Tiwari, and Nikhat Khan. It follows the story of Aditya, a failed multi-level marketing (MLM) entrepreneur, who collaborates with two partners to launch a fraudulent venture that spirals into one of the largest con jobs in their community. The film was released theatrically on 9 May 2025 and received predominantly negative reviews from critics.

== Plot ==
Aditya, a former MLM entrepreneur, suffers a devastating financial collapse that alienates his family and leads him to contemplate suicide. Determined to recover, he teams up with his friend Raghav and a veteran network marketer, Lallan. With backing from an influential financier named Pradhan, the trio launches a new business venture. However, much of the initial funding is used to repay Aditya's prior debts, and the new enterprise quickly fails.

Inspired during a visit to a restaurant using robotic waiters, Aditya devises a new scam: a fake company claiming to manufacture advanced AI-powered public service robots. To add legitimacy, they recruit a motivational speaker, Gyani, and enlist Pradeep Biswas, an impersonator, to act as the managing director. Promising high returns, they attract thousands of investors, accumulating over ₹10,000 crore.

As the scheme grows, internal tensions arise when Pradeep expresses a desire to use the funds for a legitimate business that could benefit ordinary investors. Eventually, the core trio absconds to Dubai with the collected money, leaving behind a trail of disillusioned stakeholders. The film ends with the group selectively reimbursing certain victims based on moral judgments.

== Cast and characters ==
- Vikram Kochhar as Aditya
- Rishabh Pathak as Raghav
- Durgesh Kumar as Lallan
- Ishtiyak Khan as Pradeep Biswas
- Brijendra Kala as Gyani
- Vindhya Tiwari as Ketki
- Atul Srivastava as Pradhan (Pradhanji)
- Vedika Bhandari as Disha
- Nikhat Khan as Shanti

== Reception ==
=== Critical response ===
The film received largely negative reviews from critics. Dhaval Roy of The Times of India rated it 1.5 out of 5 stars, noting that the concept had potential but suffered from shallow execution and a repetitive narrative. While acknowledging moments of humor, Roy criticized the unrealistic ease with which characters amassed large investments and described the storytelling as overly simplistic.

Film Information offered a harsher critique, describing the plot as "childish" and the screenplay as "illogical." Editor Komal Nahta labeled the film a "non-starter," citing a lack of engaging direction and uninspired dialogue. The portrayal of gullible investors was considered implausible, and the overall script was deemed lacking in coherence and credibility.
