= Brijendra Kala =

Indian film actor

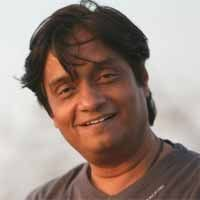
- Born: Mathura, Uttar Pradesh, India
- Occupations: Actor; screenwriter
- Years active: 2003–present

Brijendra Kala is an Indian film and theatre actor known for his realistic portrayals of everyday characters in Hindi cinema. He has appeared in many notable films and web series since the early 2000s, often in supporting roles that have received praise from critics and audiences alike for their natural style and subtle humour. He gained attention for his small roles in mainstream cinema.

== Early life ==
Kala was born in the village of Sumari in Pauri, Garhwal, Uttarakhand, India. He spent his childhood in Mathura, Uttar Pradesh, where his father worked in a veterinary hospital. He completed a Bachelor of Science degree in biochemistry from Kishori Raman College, Agra University.

Kala was involved in theatre from a young age. He performed with local theatre groups in Mathura, including the Swastik Rang Mandal, for many years before moving to Mumbai to pursue a career in acting.

== Career ==
He wrote the dialogues for several TV shows produced by Ekta Kapoor, including Kahaani Ghar Ghar Kii. He made his acting debut in 2003, when Tigmanshu Dhulia cast him in a small role as a newspaper vendor in Haasil.

Over the years, Brijendra Kala appeared in many Hindi films, often in supporting roles that stand out for their authenticity and comic touch. Some of his early notable appearances were in Jab We Met, Mithya, Agneepath, Paan Singh Tomar, Ankhon Dekhi, PK, Tubelight and Batti Gul Meter Chalu. He has also worked in web series and digital projects, expanding his presence beyond traditional cinema.

Kala’s performances are frequently described as “scene-stealing” because he brings a strong sense of reality and character depth to even smaller roles.

== Filmography ==
=== Films ===
Year	Title	Role	Notes	Ref.
1990	Mera Pati Sirf Mera Hai	Milk Vendor		
2000	Brij Kau Birju			
2003	Haasil	Newspaper vendor		
2005	Raghu Romeo	TV director		
2005	Shabd	Rama Kant		
2005	Bunty Aur Babli	Mehmood Bilal		
2006	Gafla	Stock broker		
2006	Ahista Ahista	P.C.O. owner		
2007	Jab We Met	Taxi driver		
2007	Manorama Six Feet Under	Bihari Lal		
2008	Mithya	Police inspector – Shyaam		
2008	Dasvidaniya	Shiraaz		
2009	Aloo Chaat			
2009	Raat Gayi, Baat Gayi?	Kala Briendra		
2009	Saluun	Bada Babu		
2010	10ml Love	Philostrate		
2010	Karthik Calling Karthik	Executive – telephone exchange		
2010	Dus Tola	Abdul		
2010	Pappu Can't Dance Saala	Nagesh		
2010	Phas Gaye Re Obama	Police inspector		
2011	Utt Pataang	Dolu		
2011	Mere Brother Ki Dulhan	Salman Bhai		
2011	Chalo Dilli	Train ticket collector		
2011	Jo Dooba So Paar	Dr. Sharma		
2011	Shwet	Activist		
2012	Agneepath	Muneem		
2012	Paan Singh Tomar	Press reporter		
2012	Fatso!	Vijay		
2012	Jannat 2	Dadda – Assistant of ACP Pratap Raghuvanshi		
2012	Myoho	Mr. Malhotra		
2012	Future to Bright Hai Ji	Baramdutt		
2013	Jolly LLB	Jolly's fellow lawyer	Shown in Opening Scene	
2013	Bajatey Raho	Tasvir Singh Bagga		
2014	Ankhon Dekhi	Mama Ji		
2014	Bhoothnath Returns	Manager of Heaven		
2014	Youngistaan	Kulfi / Alcohol vendor		
2014	PK	Idol seller		
2014	Kuku Mathur Ki Jhand Ho Gayi	Babaji		
2014	Identity Card Ek Lifeline	Constable		
2015	Chidiya	Suraj		
2015	Chal Guru Ho Jaa Shuru			
2015	Guddu Rangeela	Caretaker		
2015	Miss Tanakpur Haazir Ho	Lawyer		
2015	Meeruthiya Gangsters	Jayantilal Jain		
2015	Dolly Ki Doli	Sub-Inspector Khan		
2016	Rustom	Head constable Tukaram		
2016	M.S. Dhoni: The Untold Story	Commentator Shukla		
2017	Running Shaadi	Uncle of Ram Bharose		
2017	Jolly LLB 2	Dubey Ji		
2017	Tubelight	Shopkeeper		
2017	Shubh Mangal Saavdhan	Sugandha's uncle		
2017	Qarib Qarib Singlle	Hotel receptionist		
2017	Dhh	Hindi teacher	Gujarati film	
2017	Panchlait	Chhadidaar Aganu Mahto		
2018	Udanchhoo	Kal Bhairav		
2018	Angrezi Mein Kehte Hain	Batti		
2018	Love per Square Foot	T. C. Mishra	released on Netflix	
2018	Phamous	Cop		
2018	Bioscopewala	Bhola		
2018	Batti Gul Meter Chalu	Deendayal Juyal		
2018	FryDay	Thief		
2018	Zero	Pandey		
2018	PK Lele A Salesman	Mr Lele		
2019	Sharmaji Ki Lag Gayi	Professor Sharma		
2019	Ek Ladki Ko Dekha Toh Aisa Laga	Chaubey		
2019	Bharat	Chacha		
2019	Gone Kesh	Alok		
2019	Pagalpanti	Mr. Paul aka Mama Ji		
2020	Ghoomketu	Sampadak Joshi	released on Zee5	
2020	Virgin Bhanupriya	Police inspector	released on Zee5	
2020	Gulabo Sitabo	Christopher Clarke	released on Amazon Prime	
2021	Kaagaz	Highcourt judge	released on Zee5	
2021	83	Cricket Board Man 2		
2021	Banchhada			
2021	Sherni	Forest officer Bansal	released on Amazon Prime Video	
2021	Ramprasad Ki Tehrvi	Ramprasad's son-in-law	Released on Netflix	
2022	Mere Desh Ki Dharti	Dubey Ji		
2022	Janhit Mein Jaari	Aadarniya		
2022	Shabaash Mithu	BCCI Main Person		
2022	Cirkus	Yusuf		
2022	Ishq Pashmina			
2023	Kathal	Srivastva	Netflix film	
2023	Panch Kriti Five Elements	Pandit Ji		
2023	OMG 2	Dr. Gagan Malviya		
2024	Murder Mubarak	Guppie Ram	Netflix film	
2024	Good Luck	Pappi		
2024	Sarkari Baccha	Tripathi Ji		
2024	Do Patti	Katoch	Released on Netflix	
2025	Kaushaljis vs Kaushal		Released on Jio Hotstar	
2025	Sitaare Zameen Par	Daulat Ji		
2025	The Networker	Gyani		
2025	2020 Delhi	Radheshyam Nasa		
2025	Mannu Kya Karegga			
2025	Jolly LLB 3	Adv. Jawed		
2025	The Taj Story	Adv. Shashikant		
2026	Bhabiji Ghar Par Hain! Fun On The Run	Master Jee; Mama Jee		
2026	Uttar Da Puttar			
2026	Dhamaal 4	Gopaldas Seth		

=== Web series ===
Year	Title	Role	Language	Platform	Notes
2016	The Aam Aadmi Family	Satender Sharma	Hindi	YouTube	
2018	Life Sahi Hai	Sinha	Hindi	ZEE5	
2022	Yeh Kaali Kaali Ankhein	Munshi Ji	Hindi	Netflix	
2024	Maamla Legal Hai	Adv. PP	Hindi	Netflix	
2024	Gyaarah Gyaarah	Brahmdutt Chandola	Hindi	ZEE5	
2025	Dupahiya	Gyan Chand	Hindi	Prime Video	
