= Nikhat Khan =

Indian film producer (born 1962)

- Born: Nikhat Hussain Khan; 4 August 1962 (age 64); Mumbai, Maharashtra, India
- Occupations: Actress; model; film producer
- Years active: 1990–present
- Spouse: Santosh Hegde
- Children: Seher Hegde
- Father: Tahir Hussain
- Relatives: See Khan–Hussain family

Nikhat Hussain Khan (born 4 August 1962) is an Indian actress, model and film producer who works in Hindi films.

== Personal life ==
Nikhat was born in Mumbai on 4 August 1962 into an Indian Muslim family, the daughter of Bollywood actor, director, producer, and writer Tahir Hussain and his wife, Zeenat Hussain. She is the eldest of four children. She has a sister named Farhat Khan Datta and two brothers, Aamir Khan and Faisal Khan, who are also both established actors in Hindi cinema. Her family has roots from Herat in Afghanistan. Khan's paternal grandfather was a schoolteacher from a Pashtun background. Farhat Khan is married to Rajeev Datta, brother of Reena Dutta, Aamir Khan's first ex-wife.

Apart from her father and brothers, Nikhat's relatives have been active in the Hindi film industry, including her late paternal uncle, the producer-director Nasir Hussain, his son, Mansoor Khan (director of Qayamat Se Qayamat Tak) and his daughter, actress Zayn Marie Khan. Imran Khan, a former film actor, is the son of her first cousin, Nuzhat Khan. The family has significant connections beyond the film industry. Maulana Abul Kalam Azad, the Muslim scholar who was a close associate of Mahatma Gandhi, and who was made India's first Minister of Education by Jawaharlal Nehru, was her great-granduncle. The politician Najma Heptulla is a cousin of Nikhat's father.

Nikhat is married to Santosh Hegde (not to be confused with N. Santosh Hegde). Santosh is from a Tulu-speaking family in Karnataka. He retired as the CEO of a Pune-based pharmaceuticals company. Santosh, who is ten years older than Nikhat, was a divorcee with a 10-year-old son, Shravan Hegde. They both met Nikhat, while on holiday, at the Ranthambore tiger reserve in Rajasthan. The couple got married after a brief period of courtship and are the parents of a daughter, Seher Hegde. Nikhat enjoys a good relationship with her step-son, Shravan, who was raised by his biological mother.

Nikhat and her family lived in Pune for 14 years, before moving to Mumbai after Hegde's retirement, in order to take care of Nikhat's elderly mother, and to enable Nikhat to pursue her acting career, which took off in a big way, rather unexpectedly. She now features in both films and advertisements as an elegant middle-aged lady.

== Career ==
=== Acting credits ===
Year	Title	Role	Notes
2019	Mission Mangal	Gynecologist	
2019	Saand Ki Aankh	Maharani	
2020	Tanhaji	Uday Bhan's Mother	
2021	Special Ops 1.5: The Himmat Story	Meenakshi Sharma	TV series
2021	Guilty Minds	Madhavi	
2021	Tanaav	Najmi Durrani	
2021	Jamai Raja 2.0		
2021-2022	Thoda Sa Baadal Thoda Sa Paani		TV series
2022	Hush Hush	Dr. Verma	
2022	Banni Chow Home Delivery	Sulekha	TV series
2023	Pathaan	Sabba, Pathaan's foster mother	
2025	Mission Grey House	Rekha	
2025	L2: Empuraan	Subhadra Ben	Malayalam film
2025	The Networker	Shanti devi	
2025	Sitaare Zameen Par	Hargovind's Mother	
2025	Baaghi 4	Christy	
2025	Crime Beat	Nirmala Devi Kapoor	TV series
2026			
2026	Main Vaapas Aaunga	Rumana Ahmedzai	
2026	Bandar	Samar's mother	

=== Modelling ===
- Axis Bank Senior Citizen Festival
- Don & Julio Suiting
- Brigade Group
- Fazlani Foods
- Reliance Jewels
- ORANGE Health Labs Print/Hoarding and Video
- Vivo Khushi Inspires and Enables
- Amazon
- Wonder Cement
- Welspun Logistics
- Haldirams
- Orange Health Labs
- First Cry
- Wipro Lights
- Paytm
- Head & Shoulders
- Bournvita Master Blaster
- Fazlani Cut The Packet
- Indiabulls
- Wellspun Bedsheets

=== Producer ===
- Dulha Bikta Hai (1982)
- Tum Mere Ho (1990)
- Hum Hain Rahi Pyar Ke (1993)
- Madhosh (1994)
- Lagaan (2001)
