= Sonal Madhushankar =

Indian actress

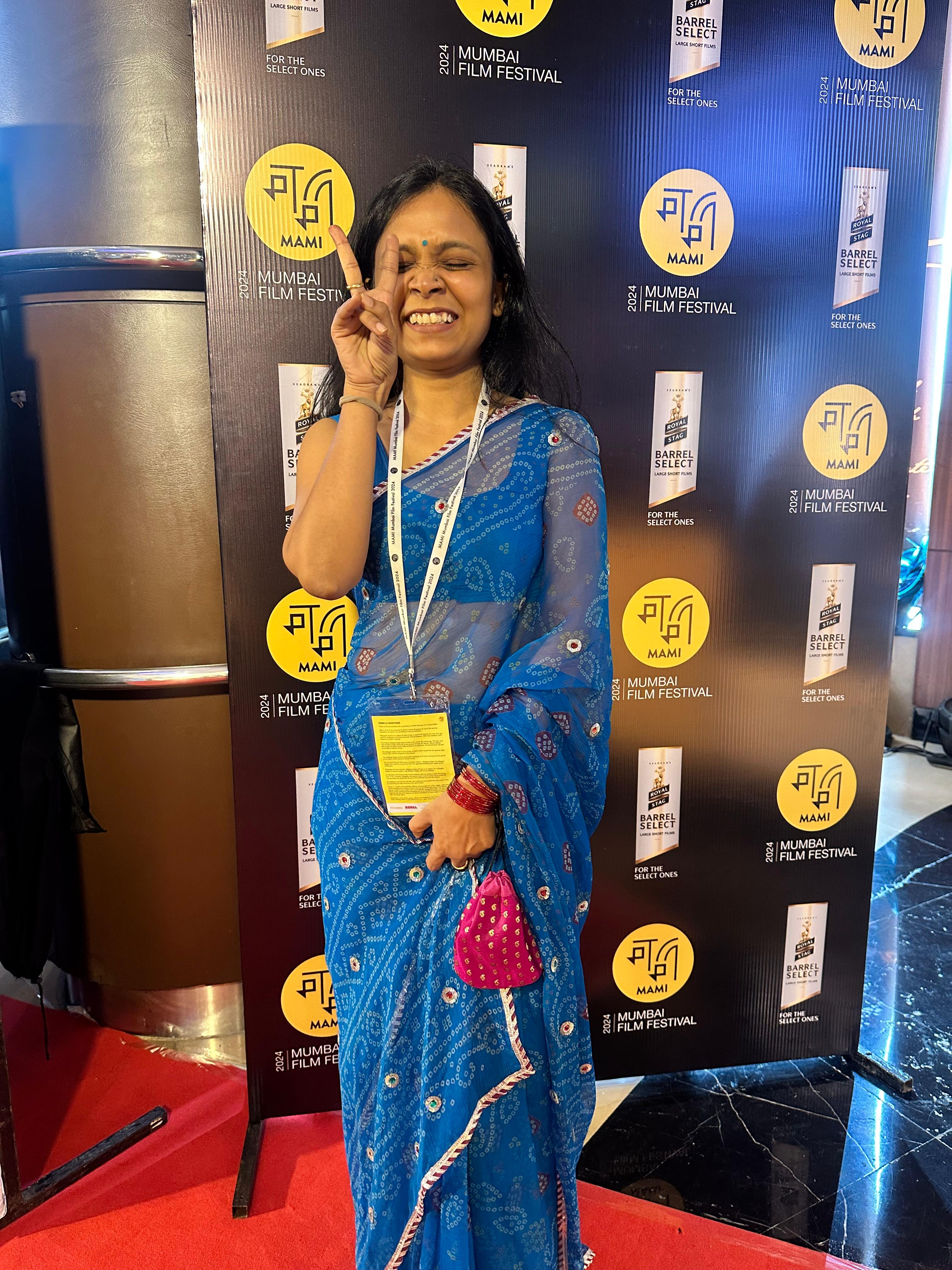
- Sonal Madhushankar at Mumbai Mami 2025
- Other name: Sonal Sogare
- Education: Rajiv Gandhi College of Engineering, Research and Technology, Chandrapur
- Occupation: actress

Sonal Madhushankar (also credited as Sonal Sagore) is an Indian actress known for her work in films, web series, and theatre. She gained recognition for her roles in Gangubai Kathiawadi (2022) and the festival-acclaimed film Humans in the Loop (2024).

== Early life and education ==
Sonal hails from Chandrapur, Maharashtra. She pursued a Bachelor of Engineering in electronics from RCERT, Chandrapur. Her passion for the performing arts led her to obtain a postgraduate degree in acting from the Drama School of Mumbai (DSM).

== Career ==
=== Film and television ===
Sonal made her feature film debut in 2022 with Sanjay Leela Bhansali's Gangubai Kathiawadi, portraying the character "Banno."

In 2024, she starred as "Nehma" in the Hindi-Kurukh film Humans in the Loop, directed by Aranya Sahay. The film follows an Adivasi woman from Jharkhand who unexpectedly finds herself interacting with artificial intelligence, unraveling its hidden biases and ethical dilemmas.

Her web series credits include roles such as Rosy Telkar in Duranga (2023), Rashmi in Delhi Crime Season 2 (2022), Akka in Die Trying (2018), and Ragini in Kalamanch (2023).

=== Theatre ===
Sonal has an extensive background in theatre with more than 10 years of experience, having performed with various groups across India. She played the lead role of "Seema" in the Hindi play The Last Audience, and has also acted in other plays such as The Last Laugh, Dhruvswamini, Baaki Itihas, Ande Ke Chilke, Aaina, and Andhon Ka Hathi.

=== Other work ===
Outside of acting, Sonal is trained in Chhau dance, clowning, and pistol shooting. She also served as the casting lead at Yash Raj Films for two years, contributing to films like Mardaani 2 and Bunty Aur Babli 2.

== Filmography ==
=== Films ===
- Gangubai Kathiawadi (2022) – as Banno
- Humans in the Loop (2024) – as Nehma
- Danga (2024) – as Shanti

=== Web Series ===
- Duranga (2023) – as Rosy Telkar
- Delhi Crime: Season 2 (2022) – as Rashmi
- Die Trying (2018) – as Akka
- Kalamanch (2023) – as Ragini
- Black White and Grey (2025)
