= Hum Bhi Akele Tum Bhi Akele =

2021 Indian film

- Official poster
- Directed by: Harish Vyas
- Written by: Susan Fernandes; Harish Vyas
- Produced by: First Ray Films
- Starring: Zareen Khan; Anshuman Jha
- Cinematography: Faroukh Mistry; Rakesh Rawat
- Edited by: Suresh Pai
- Music by: Oni-Adil
- Production company: First Ray Films
- Distributed by: Disney+ Hotstar
- Release date: 9 May 2021
- Running time: 117 minutes
- Country: India
- Language: Hindi

Hum Bhi Akele Tum Bhi Akele (transl. We both are alone) is a 2021 Indian Hindi-language film written and directed by Harish Vyas and produced under the banner of First Ray Films. The film stars Anshuman Jha, Zareen Khan along with Ravi Khanvilkar, Gurfateh Pirzada and Nitin Sharma in supporting roles. The film was released on 9 May 2021 on Hotstar. It received generally mixed reviews, with praise for its performances and LGBT themes, but criticism for its screenplay and second half.

== Plot ==
The film explores friendship between Veer Pratap Randhawa, a gay man and Mansi Dubey, a lesbian woman on a road trip.

== Cast ==
- Zareen Khan as Mansi Dubey
- Anshuman Jha as Veer Pratap Randhawa
- Ravi Khanvilkar as Mr Dubey
- Gurfateh Pirzada as Akshay Mittal
- Nitin Sharma as Ashar
- Jahnvi Rawat as Nikki Tsong
- Denzil Smith as MLA Tsong

== Production ==
The principal photography of the film started in mid-June 2019.

== Release ==
The film had its World Premiere at the HBO South Asian International Film Festival & had a successful festival run. Originally the film was scheduled for theatrical release in March 2020 but due to pandemic it observed delays in release and finally the film was released on 9 May 2021 on Hotstar.

== Soundtrack ==
Hum Bhi Akele Tum Bhi Akele

Soundtrack album by Oni-Adil
- Released: 5 May 2021
- Recorded: 2020
- Genre: Feature film soundtrack
- Length: 22:36
- Language: Hindi
- Label: Zee Music Company

Official audio
- Hum Bhi Akele Tum Bhi Akele - Full Album on YouTube

The film's music was composed by Oni-Adil while lyrics written by Bulleh Shah, Sourabh Negi and Pratyush Prakash.

Track listing
No.	Title	Lyrics	Singer(s)	Length
1.	"Bullah Ki Jaana"	Bulleh Shah	Adil Rasheed	4:16
2.	"Mashhoor Hai Tu"	Sourabh Negi	Adil Rasheed	3:59
3.	"Nazdeekiyan"	Sourabh Negi	Adil Rasheed	4:48
4.	"Hai Nahin"	Pratyush Prakash	Adil Rasheed	3:40
5.	"Nazdeekiyan" (Female version)	Sourabh Negi	Parul Mishra	5:23
Total length:				22:36

== Reception ==
Sana Farzeen of The Indian Express wrote: "Hum Bhi Akele Tum Bhi Akele started on a promising note. However, it soon faltered with the makers wanting to add too many twists to the tale." Udita Jhunjhunwala in her review for Firstpost rated the film 2/5 and appreciated the performances of Khan and Zha but criticized its slow narration. "Hum Bhi Akele Tum Bhi Akele has some freshness, but its the mawkish climax that rids the story of any realism," Jhunjhunwala added.

Cinema Express critic Shilajit Mitra, who also rated the film 2/5, stated: "The film is pleasantly shot, in sync with its chilled-out score, but its need to verbalise everything ruins all intimacy."
