= Daaka =

Punjabi language action film directed by Baljit Singh Deo

- Directed by: Baljit Singh Deo
- Screenplay by: Gippy Grewal
- Story by: Gippy Grewal
- Produced by: Bhushan Kumar; Krishan Kumar; Gippy Grewal; Ravneet Kaur Grewal
- Starring: Gippy Grewal; Zareen Khan; Rana Ranbir; Shehnaaz Kaur Gill
- Cinematography: Baljit Singh Deo
- Edited by: Rohit Dhiman
- Music by: Jatinder Shah
- Production companies: T-Series; Humble Motion Pictures
- Distributed by: AA Films
- Release date: 1 November 2019 (India)
- Running time: 135 minutes
- Country: India
- Language: Punjabi

Daaka is an Indian Punjabi-language action comedy film directed by Baljit Singh Deo. The film was released on November 1, 2019.

== Plot ==
Daaka is a movie about two poverty-stricken men who have their own set of problems to deal with. One, named Shinda is a love bird who falls for the daughter of a retired school teacher, who is financially well off. The other, Balli, is the father of a girl child who is suffering from a stomach tumour. These men co-own a mobile repair 'khokha' but in order to sustain their business, they must pay the shop owner 2.5 lacs or else they'll lose their space. When they manage to somehow gather a handsome sum to pay the shop owner, things take an unplanned turn and they're left with just a plan and that too of robbing their village bank. When they are robbing the bank, the criminal being held in the Jail cell escapes. This leads to a whole sequence of events, leaving both Shinda and Balli wanted by the police.

== Cast ==
- Gippy Grewal as Shinda
- Zareen Khan as Laali
- Rana Ranbir as Balli
- Shehnaaz Kaur Gill as Pushpa
- Mukul Dev as Inspector Kuldeep Singh
- Hobby Dhaliwal as Sukhchain
- Rana Jung Bahadur as Sheth Mohan Lal
- Shavinder Mahal as Masterji (Laali's Father)
- Prince Kanwaljit Singh as Constable Beant Singh
- Baninder Bunny as Bank Manager Sukhdev

== Production ==
Development of the film commenced in 2018. On 27 November 2018, Gippy Grewal worked with T-Series. On 21 February 2019 principal photography began using cinematographer Baljit Singh Deo. The leads were played by Grewal and Zareen Khan.

This film has a similar plot to Jatt James Bond, a movie starring both Gippy Grewal and Zareen Khan.

== Release and marketing ==
Gippy Grewal announced Daaka in February 2019. The film was scheduled to be released on 13 September 2019, but it was delayed to 1 November 2019.

== Soundtrack ==
Daaka

Soundtrack album by Jatinder Shah, Rochak Kohli, Payal Dev, Aditya Dev and Jay K
- Released: 31 October 2019
- Recorded: 2019
- Genre: Feature film soundtrack
- Length: 15:49
- Label: T-Series
External audio
- Official Audio Jukebox on YouTube

The music was composed by Jatinder Shah, Rochak Kohli, Payal Dev, Aditya Dev and Jay K. The lyrics were written by Gautam G Sharma, Gurpreet Saini, Happy Raikoti and Kumaar.

Koi Aye Na Rabba is a remake song, originally composed by Vishal–Shekhar for the 2004 film Musafir.

Track list
No.	Title	Lyrics	Music	Singer(s)	Length
1.	"Phulkari" (Original lyrics by: Jagdev Mann)	Gautam G Sharma, Gurpreet Saini	Payal Dev	Gippy Grewal	2:47
2.	"Daaka Title Track"	Happy Raikoti	Jay K	Himmat Sandhu	4:16
3.	"Koi Aaye Na Rabba"	Kumaar	Rochak Kohli	Rochak Kohli, B Praak	4:02
4.	"Gal Theek Ni Lagdi"	Happy Raikoti	Jatinder Shah	Sunidhi Chauhan, Gippy Grewal	2:53
5.	"Phulkari Version 2" (Original lyrics by: Jagdev Mann)	Gautam G Sharma, Gurpreet Saini	Payal Dev	Gippy Grewal	1:51
Total length:					15:49

== Reception ==
=== Critical response ===
Gurnaaz Kaur of The Tribune gave the film three and a half stars out of five. Kaur concluded, "The story may be a clichéd one, the execution still gets the thumbs-up. To have such a well-crafted tale in Punjabi cinema is a matter of pride. It reflects the growing technical strength of the industry". Gurlove Singh of BookMyShow said, "Daaka is an interesting story that has been narrated stylishly. The film is absolutely entertaining [...] The film has everything – love, thrill, violence, colorful songs and more. It cannot be denied that Daaka is a complete package".
