= Mohit Madaan =

Indian Hindi-film actor (born 1988)

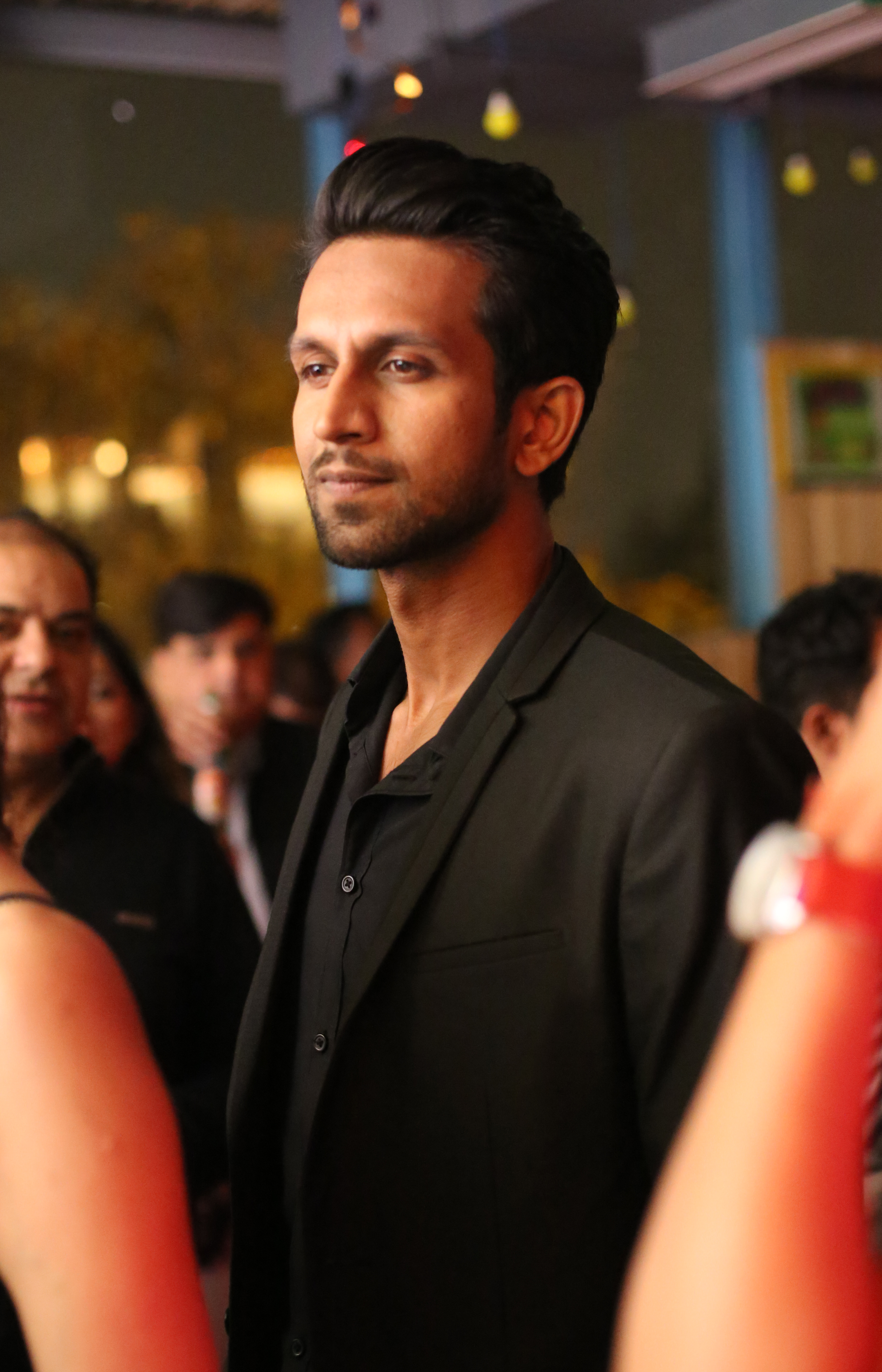
- Born: 7 January 1988 (age 38); Delhi, India
- Education: University of Auckland
- Occupation: Actor
- Years active: 2015 –

Mohit Madaan (born 7 January 1988) is an Indian Hindi-film actor. He got recognition by playing the mastermind Bachchan Singh, one of the main characters in the film Aksar 2, a Hindi thriller film directed by Anant Mahadevan, co-starring Zareen Khan and Gautam Rode. The film is the sequel to 2006 hit film Aksar. Mohit Madaan is also credited as Mohit Madan in media.

== Early life and education ==
Madaan was born to Vijay Madaan and Renu Madaan on 7 January 1988 in suburban Delhi. He moved to the UAE with his family at the age of 3 continuing his education there till the age of 13. In 2001, Mohit migrated with his family to Auckland, New Zealand where he completed his high school education at Macleans College. He started building his interest towards Drama while taking part in school plays and theatre groups. Mohit got his bachelor's degree in Business and Information Management (BBIM) from the University of Auckland. Upon his graduation his family migrated back to Dubai and Mohit began his career working as an External Auditor at a reputed Accounting firm. Later, he realized this was not the profession he wanted to be in and left that and began working with his father handling the finance department in their family business He moved to Mumbai and continues to reside there while working in the Hindi film industry.

== Career ==
He debuted in the film Love Exchange in 2015, where he played Siddharth Sathe, a Maharashtrian boy who falls in love with a Punjabi girl. He was recently seen in Aksar 2, an upcoming Hindi thriller film directed by Anant Mahadevan, co-starring Zareen Khan and Gautam Rode, where he plays a character named "Bachchan Singh". The film is the sequel to 2006 film Aksar.

== See also ==
- List of Indian film actors

== Filmography ==
Year	Title	work	Roles	Notes
2015	Love exchange	Actor	Siddharth Sathe	Debut film
2017	Aksar 2	Actor	Bachchan Singh	
2017	Ishq Tera	Actor	Rahul/Kabir	Post Production
