= Impatient Vivek =

- Theatrical release poster
- Directed by: Rahat Kazmi
- Screenplay by: Rahat Kazmi
- Story by: Rahat Kazmi; B. K. Tyagi
- Produced by: Ashok Chauhan; Malvee S.
- Starring: Vivek Sudershan; Sayali Bhagat
- Cinematography: Sethuraman M
- Edited by: Jalindar Thorat
- Music by: Shahdaab Bhartiya; Neeraj Shrivastava; Raja Ali; Aanamik
- Production company: A Search Film's
- Release date: 7 January 2011
- Country: India
- Language: Hindi

Impatient Vivek is a 2011 Hindi-language romantic comedy film, directed by Rahat Kazmi and produced by Ashok Chauhan & Malvee S. It was released under the Search Film banner. The film was the first Bollywood release of 2011, alongside No One Killed Jessica, on 7 January.

== Cast ==
- Vivek Sudarshan as iV
- Sayali Bhagat as Shruti
- Hrishikesh Joshi as Jaggi
- Charu Asopa as Rani
- Rounaog Ahuja as Annu
- Muni Jha
- Pratik Dixit
- Nirmal Soni
- Ashok Beniwal
- R. P. Singh
- Kirti Kapoor
- Vijay Bhatia
- Sharmila Goenka
- Anurag Saxena
- Zia A. Khan
- Denzil Smith as Rameshwar

== Soundtrack ==
The music is composed by Neeraj Shrivastava, Raja Ali, Shahdaab Bhartiya, Aanamik. Lyrics are written Neeraj Shrivastava, Rahat Kazmi, Nusrat Badr, Sanjay Mishra, Aamir Ali, Binish Khan.

=== Track listing ===
No.	Title	Music	Singer(s)	Length
1.	"Ek Pari Pagal Si"	Neeraj Shrivastava	Vivek Sudarshan, Rahul Seth, Sharmishtha	5:00
2.	"Impatient Vivek"	Aanamik	Dominique Cerejo, Vivek Sudarshan	4:46
3.	"Ishq Musibat"	Raja Ali	Vivek Sudarshan	3:44
4.	"Khuraphat"	Neeraj Shrivastava	Vivek Sudarshan	4:58
5.	"Meri Nindiya Udne"	Raja Ali	Vivek Sudarshan, Tarannum	3:31
6.	"Pal Hai Makhmali"	Shahdaab Bhartiya	Hariharan, Asmita D	4:55
7.	"Tujhe Manga Hai"	Raja Ali	Vivek Sudarshan	4:36
8.	"Ye Banda Maskalandar"	Raja Ali	Vivek Sudarshan, Shaznine	3:02
9.	"Ek Pari Pagal Si" (Love Reprise)	Neeraj Shrivastava	Vivek Sudarshan	5:26
10.	"Tujhe Manga Hai" (Remix)	Raja Ali	Vivek Sudarshan, Shaznine	4:15

== Box office ==
Film was made on budget of 5 crore, and at the box office it collected Rs. 17 crore.
