= Gurfateh Pirzada =

Indian actor (born 1996)

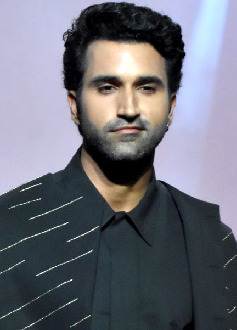
- Pirzada in 2023
- Born: Gurfateh Singh Pirzada; 29 October 1996 (age 29); Chandigarh, India
- Occupation: Actor
- Years active: 2018–present
- Relatives: Mehreen Pirzada (sister)

Gurfateh Singh Pirzada (born 29 October 1996) is an Indian actor who works primarily in Hindi films and web series. He began his acting career with Friends in Law in 2018. Pirzada has since starred in Netflix thriller Guilty (2020) and romantic film Hum Bhi Akele Tum Bhi Akele (2021). Pirzada has since starred in the streaming series Class (2023) and Call Me Bae (2024).

== Early life and family ==
Pirzada was born on 29 October 1996 in Chandigarh, India into the Sikh family of an agriculturist and realtor father Gurlal Pirzada and a housewife mother Paramjit Kaur. His only sibling is a sister named Mehreen Pirzada who is also a model and actress.

== Filmography ==
=== Films ===
Year	Title	Role	Notes	Ref.
2018	Friends in Law	Aakash		
2020	Guilty	Vijay Pratap Singh		
2021	Hum Bhi Akele Tum Bhi Akele	Akshay Mittal		
2022	Brahmāstra: Part One – Shiva	Sher		
2026	Lust Stories 3	Karan & Arjun	Dual role	

=== Web series ===
Year	Title	Role	Notes	Ref.
2023	Class	Neeraj Kumar Valmiki		
2024	Call Me Bae	Neel Nair		
2026	The Revolutionaries	Bagha Jatin	Period drama on Amazon Prime Video	
TBA	Dynasty †	TBA	Post-production	

=== Music videos ===
Year	Title	Singer(s)	Ref.
2021	"Mehendi"	Dhvani Bhanushali, Vishal Dadlani	
2023	"Bairiya"	Arijit Singh	
2025	"Channa"	Jonita Gandhi	

== Awards and nominations ==
Year	Award	Category	Work	Result	Ref.
2020	Filmfare OTT Awards	Best Supporting Actor: Web Original Film	Guilty	Nominated	
