= Kanavu Meippada Vendum =

Tamil-language drama film

- Theatrical release poster
- Directed by: Janaki Vishwanathan
- Written by: Janaki Viswanathan
- Produced by: Ramesh S. Arunachalam; Sakthi Rama Arunachalam
- Starring: Ramya Krishnan; Lakshmi Gopalaswamy; Asim Sharma; Tanu Vidyarthi
- Cinematography: C. J. Rajkumar
- Music by: Mahesh Mahadevan
- Production company: Sruthika Foundations
- Release date: 14 April 2004
- Country: India
- Language: Tamil

Kanavu Meippada Vendum (transl. Dreams should come true) is a 2004 Indian Tamil-language drama film written and directed by Janaki Vishwanathan. The film stars Ramya Krishnan, Lakshmi Gopalaswamy with debutants Asim Sharma and Thanu Vidyarthi. The film was released on 14 April 2004.

== Cast ==
- Ramya Krishnan as Varalakshmi
- Asim Sharma as Mohanasundaram
- Lakshmi Gopalaswamy as Hema
- Thanu Vidyarthi as Nandita
- Ganesh Babu as Saravanan
- Senthil Kumar as Karuppaiah
- Hans Kaushik as Warden Sundarapandian
- Karthik Srinivasan as Raju
- Shankar Sundaram as M. L. A. Thangaraj
- B. G. Krishnan as Devanathan
- Kamala Krishnaswamy as Saroja Devanathan
- Bejoy Menon as Arasampatti zamindar
- Roopan as Arumugam
- Mohan Ram as District collector
- Uma Riyaz as Kokila
- Sudharani Raghupathy as Ranganayaki
- J. Rajiv Choudhry as Nandita's boss
- R. S. G. Chelladurai as Patient

== Soundtrack ==
Soundtrack was composed by Mahesh Mahadevan. This was one of his last projects completed before his death. Ramya Krishnan made her singing debut with this film.

- "Thazham Poove" – Ramya Krishna
- "Adi Adi Paraiadi" – Padaiyappa Sreeram
- "Panja Panam" – Vidya
- "Aagayame Boologame" – Vijay Gopal
- "Vidiyum Vidiyum" – S. P. Balasubrahmanyam
- "Vazhaigal Kamugu" – Vidya
- "Kadhal Vazhga" – Ragavan Manian

== Release and reception ==
Kanavu Meippada Vendum was released on 14 April 2004. Malathi Rangarajan of The Hindu wrote that the film "takes up a socially relevant issue and tackles it with sensitivity". Malini Mannath of Chennai Online wrote "It's a matter-of-fact narration and the style is documentary" calling it "a commendable effort from the director whose persistence in making meaningful films on social issues should be appreciated". Sify called it "flawed and to a large extent rather disappointing." Visual Dasan of Kalki praised Janaki for taking a new leap in storytelling for the director who was reinventing her screen language with masterful screenplay, natural visuals without fuss. Cinesouth wrote "There probably is no other director in Tamil who could have dealt with such a sensitive social issue without bringing in anything vulgar in it".
