= Yeh Hai Bakrapur =

- Theatrical release poster
- Directed by: Janaki Vishwanathan
- Written by: Janaki Vishwanathan
- Produced by: Ramesh S Arunachalam
- Starring: Anshuman Jha; Asif Basra; Suruchi Aulakh; Faiz Khan; Yoshika Verma; Vinay Varma
- Cinematography: Abinandhan Ramanujam
- Edited by: Hemanti Sarkar
- Music by: Score: Aditya Pushkarna; Songs: Agnee (band)
- Distributed by: Shruthikkaa Films
- Release dates: October 2013 (Mumbai Film Festival); 9 May 2014 (India)
- Country: India
- Language: Hindi

Yeh Hai Bakrapur (transl. This is the land of goats) is a 2014 Indian Hindi-language social satire film set against the backdrop of rural India. The film was released in India on 9 May 2014.

== Plot ==
A multi-layered film, it is based on the complex belief systems that prevail in Indian society and the conflicts that ensue thereon. The film's story revolves around the family of the Qureshis and their pet animal goat. Circumstances result in the goat acquiring rock star status in his village and beyond. Soon enough, people are fighting for a piece of the live goat, named Sharukh. The climax provides the finale to the mayhem that preceded it.

== Cast ==
- Anshuman Jha
- Asif Basra
- Suruchi Aulakh
- Faiz Khan
- Yoshika Verma
- Shameem Khan
- Amit Sial (cameo)
- Utkarsh Majumdar (cameo)
- Vinay Varma

== Production and release ==
The movie was screened at the 37th Göteborg International Film Festival. It was part of The Film Bazaar in the year 2012 as work in progress and it was also premiered at the Mumbai Academy of the Moving Image, 2013 Festival

== Reception ==
Film Critic Taran Adarsh writing for Bollywood Hungama said that the movie "employs a comic tone to tell a serious story. Armed with a simplistic, but innovative plot and an engaging screenplay."

Subhash K. Jha gave it 3 Stars and said that the movie is a scathing satire on blind faith. The movie is flush with fun, not necessarily intentional.
