= Missed Call (film) =

- Directed by: Mridul Toolsidas; Vinay Subramaniam
- Starring: Ankur Vikal; Heeba Shah; Ram Kapoor; Salim Ghouse
- Cinematography: Sejal Shah; Nitin Sagar
- Release date: 2005
- Country: India
- Language: Hindi

Missed Call is a 2005 Indian English language film directed by Mridul Toolsidas and Vinay Subramaniam duo.

== Plot ==
The protagonist, a 20-something Gaurav Sengupta (Ankur Vikal) is obsessed with the idea of capturing every moment in life on celluloid and narrates the story as seen through his eyes. It is his journey from joy to despair, from hope to frustration and from love to lust.

== Production ==
The movie was produced by Reelism Films and was their debut production. The movie was directed by the director duo, Mridul Toolsidas and Vinay Subramanian.

== Cast ==
- Ankur Vikal as Gaurav Sengpupta
- Salim Ghouse as Arindam Kumar Sengputa
- Heeba Shah as Gayatri
- Ram Kapoor as Vinay Murthy
- Tinnu Anand as DK Bose
- Seema Rahmani as Rose

== Awards ==
- Opening Film at Indian Panorama section of the 36th International Film Festival of India
- Featured in World Cinema India section at the 60th Cannes Film Festival.
- Best International Film at the Israel Film Festival, United States.
- Best International Film at the Red Sea International Film Festival in 2008.
- Films Division of India's "Best of Indian Cinema."
