= The Revolutionaries (TV series) =

2026 Indian period drama television series

- Official promotional poster
- Genre: Period drama Historical
- Based on: Revolutionaries: The Other Story of How India Won Its Freedom by Sanjeev Sanyal
- Directed by: Nikkhil Advani
- Starring: Bhuvan Bam; Rohit Saraf; Pratibha Ranta; Gurfateh Pirzada; Jason Shah; Pratik Motwani
- Country of origin: India
- Original language: Hindi
- No. of seasons: 1
- No. of episodes: 8

Production
- Producers: Nikkhil Advani; Monisha Advani; Madhu Bhojwani
- Production locations: Mumbai, Amritsar, Varanasi, Dehradun
- Production company: Emmay Entertainment

Original release
- Network: Amazon Prime Video
- Release: 11 September 2026

The Revolutionaries is an Indian period action thriller streaming television series directed by Nikkhil Advani released on 11 September 2026 on Amazon Prime Video. The series is based on the non-fiction book Revolutionaries: The Other Story Of How India Won Its Freedom by Sanjeev Sanyal.

== Cast ==
- Bhuvan Bam as Rash Behari Bose
- Rohit Saraf as Sachindranath Sanyal
- Pratibha Ranta as Pratibha Lahiri
- Gurfateh Pirzada as Bagha Jatin
- Jason Shah as General Dyer
- Ed Robinson as Charles Tegart
- Pratik Motwani as Maan Singh
- Paoli Dam as Nanibala Devi
- Tota Roy Chowdhury as Abani Sanyal
- Kashish Saluja as Kartar Singh Sarabha
- Tenzin Bodh as Marwin Chhetri
- Avijit Dutt as Vishnu Chandra Sanyal
- K.C. Shankar as P. N. Tagore
- Gireesh Sahdev as Mula Singh
- Bhavya Grover as Shailja
- Pallavi Chatterjee as Kadambari Kaki
- Neil Bhoopalam as Lala Har Dayal
- Rajdeep Bhattacharya as Basanta Kumar Biswas
- Ananyabrata Chakravorty as Hari Mondal
- Siddhant Raj as Ravi Singh

== Production ==
The Revolutionaries is directed by Nikkhil Advani and produced by Monisha Advani and Madhu Bhojwani.

The series is written by Akshita Wadhwana, Shobhit Narang, Rutvi Mehta and Sanyuktha Chawla Shaikh. Casting for the series is overseen by Kavish Sinha. Filming is taking place across multiple locations in India, including Mumbai, Amritsar, Varanasi, and Dehradun.

The production design is led by Surabhi Verma, with costume design by Sakshi Goel. The art department includes Ankit Gupta, Rohit Nalawade, and Jainil Sachde. Gaffer Imsajidshaikh is credited with lighting.

== Release ==
The series released on 11 September 2026 and priemered By exclusively on Amazon Prime Video in over 240 countries and territories.

== Reception ==
Upon its release the series received mixed reviews.

Bollywood Hungama gave the series 3.5 stars and called it a "a grand, compelling and well-performed historical drama". Archika Khurana of The Times of India gave 3 stars out of 5 and wrote that the series was "an engaging, well-mounted slow burn with strong performances, immersive period detailing and an important historical perspective". Sana Farzeen of India Today rated it 3.5/5 stars and said that "there are enough goosebump-inducing moments to keep you hooked".

The Hollywood Reporter India's Rahul Desai described the series as "a dry and disappointing freedom-fighter epic". Shreyas Pande of The Hindu writes that "The visual vividness of the Bhuvan Bam, Rohit Saraf and Pratibha Ranta starrer seems cut off more from hyper-stylistic comic strips than a history book". Abhimanyu Mathur from Hindustan Times gave the series 2.5 stars out of and said that the series "gets lost in its ambition to be grand and cinematic, sacrificing sound storytelling on the altar of grandeur and mass entertainment".

Radhika Sharma of NDTV rated it 2.5/5 stars says that "Bhuvan Bam is easily one of the few good things about The Revolutionaries". Sarita A Tanwar of Variety India called the series "thrilling in bits, but it’s too talky and has creaky moments."

== See also ==
- Freedom at Midnight (TV series)
- Indian independence movement
