= Aksar 2 =

2017 film directed by Anant Mahadevan

- Theatrical release poster
- Directed by: Anant Mahadevan
- Written by: Anant Mahadevan
- Screenplay by: Sanjeev Puri
- Produced by: Shyam Bajaj; Narendra Bajaj
- Starring: Zareen Khan; Gautam Rode; Abhinav Shukla; S. Sreesanth
- Edited by: Jeetendra Shah
- Music by: Mithoon
- Production company: Siddhi Vinayak Creation
- Distributed by: Tips Industries; Eros International
- Release date: 17 November 2017
- Running time: 117 minutes
- Country: India
- Language: Hindi
- Box office: ₹71.8 million

Aksar 2 (transl. Often 2) is a 2017 Indian Hindi-language erotic thriller film directed by Anant Mahadevan. The film is sequel to the 2006 film Aksar. The film stars Zareen Khan, Gautam Rode, Abhinav Shukla and Mohit Madaan in lead roles. The film was released on 17 November 2017.

== Plot ==
An old lady, Dolly Khambata, needs a governess as her earlier governess has died in a road accident. Her financial advisor, Patrick Sharma, hires Sheena Roy even though she is way younger than 50 years which is the age requirement for this job. Seeing Sheena's beauty he lusts after her. Patrick is very close to Dolly Khambata but, he soon tells Sheena that he is not very fond of her. Patrick has a glad eye for Sheena whom he forces and has sex with. It is revealed that, like Sheena, women who have previously worked with Patrick have been forced to have sex with him whether they like it or not, fearing his influence. Sheena already has a boyfriend, Ricky. It is soon revealed that Ricky is actually the estranged nephew of Dolly Khambata. The aunt and nephew have had a fallout over the matter of property and wealth. Ricky had vowed to drag Dolly to court so that he can get his share of the property which Dolly has in her possession. There is also Dolly Khambata's trusted lawyer, Gaurav.

Sheena reveals to Patrick that Dolly has made him the beneficiary of her bungalow in London, in her will. Unable to believe that Dolly could do so, he somehow opens her locker and gets hold of the will. He is pleasantly surprised to see his name in the will.

The house manager, Bachchan, now confronts Patrick and asks him for a favour. It turns out that Sheena and Bachchan are hand-in-glove to usurp the property of Dolly. Bachchan, who is expert at copying people's signatures, promises to keep the London property bequeathed to Patrick while changing the will to bequeath the rest in his and Ricky's name.

The suspense unfolds as Ricky and Bachchan are killed in the different accident, and only Patrick, Sheena and Mrs. Khambata are left.

With the help of Gaurav Sheena kills Mrs Khambata and make it look like a natural death and finally kills Patrick in an accident by making his car collide in a forest.

With the possession of Mrs. Khambata's property in hand, Gaurav and Sheena decide to share it equally and then part ways forever.

== Cast ==
- Zareen Khan as Sheena Roy
- Gautam Rode as Patrick Sharma
- Abhinav Shukla as Ricky Khambata
- Mohit Madaan as Bachchan Singh
- Lillete Dubey as Dolly Khambatta
- S. Sreesanth as Gaurav, a lawyer
- Denzil Smith
- Rushad Rana

== Production ==
=== Filming ===
The principal photography of the film started in July 2016.

== Soundtrack ==
Aksar 2

Soundtrack album by Mithoon
- Released: 7 November 2017
- Genre: Feature film soundtrack
- Length: 14:42
- Language: Hindi
- Label: Tips Music

Mithoon chronology
Shivaay (2016)	Aksar 2 (2017)	Half Girlfriend (2017)

Singles from Aksar 2
- 1. "Aaj Zid" Released: 6 September 2017; 2. "Jaana Ve" Released: 15 September 2017; 3. "Tanhaiyaan" Released: 6 October 2017

The soundtrack of the film is composed by Mithoon while the lyrics are penned by Sayeed Quadri.

Track listing
No.	Title	Singer(s)	Length
1.	"Aaj Zid"	Arijit Singh	4:12
2.	"Jaana Ve"	Arijit Singh	5:33
3.	"Tanhaiyaan"	Amit Mishra	5:05
Total length:			14:42

== Reception ==
=== Critical reception ===
Lasyapriya Sundaram of The Times of India gave the film a rating of 2.5 out of 5 saying that, "Aksar 2 is a movie that begins well, but quickly crumbles to a point of no return." Kunal Guha of Mumbai Mirror gave the film a rating of 1.5 out of 5 saying that, "the twists and turns here seem more unnecessary than unexpected and the predictably painful expressions inevitably culminate in a headache." Prasanna D Zore of Rediff gave the film a rating of 2.5 out of 5 saying that, "Aksar 2 is a film that gets you primed in the first half but is a sad squib in the second." Shantanu David of News18 gave a rating of 2.5 out of 5 saying that, "with a different female lead and without the disconcerting songs, this would have been a pretty decent film." Bollywood Hungama rated the film 1 out of 5 stars, commenting, "AKSAR 2 is a poor show all the way. It neither has enough sex nor thrill."
