= Mango Soufflé =

- Theatrical release poster
- Directed by: Mahesh Dattani
- Written by: Mahesh Dattani
- Produced by: Sanjeev Shah
- Starring: Ankur Vikal; Atul Kulkarni; Denzil Smith; Faredoon Bhujwala; Heeba Shah; Rinkie Khanna; Sanjit Bedi
- Music by: Amit Heri
- Release date: 2002
- Running time: 89 minutes
- Country: India
- Language: English

Mango Soufflé is a 2002 Indian English language film written and directed by Mahesh Dattani. The film stars Atul Kulnani and Rinkie Khanna. It was promoted as "first gay male film from India" and was adapted from Dattani's own English play On a Muggy Night in Mumbai. The film was shot in Bangalore.

== Plot ==
A gay fashion designer Kamlesh is recovering from his recently ended relationship calls some of his friends over for dinner to make a special announcement about his personal life. But then Kamlesh's sister enters the party with her fiancé, a man with a secret.

== Cast ==
- Ankur Vikal as Kamlesh
- Atul Kulkarni as Ed (Edwin Prakash)
- Rinke Khanna as Kiran
- Darius Taraporewal as Father of Kiran and Kamlesh
- Veena Sajnani as Mother of Kiran and Kamlesh
- Mahmood Farooqui as Maqsood
- Pooja as Maid
- Faredoon Dodo Bhujwala as Sharad
- Heeba Shah as Deepali
- Shunori Ramanathan as Girl (as Shenori Ramnathan)
- Mikhail Sen as Boy
- Kalyanraman as Bride's Father
- Shilpa M. as Bride
- Suma Sudhindra as Bride's Mother
- Manek Shah as Boy on the Road
- Sanjit Bedi as Bunny Singh
- Denzil Smith as Ranjith
- U.K. Jayadev as Groom's Father
- Rubi Chakravarthy as Groom's Mother
- Paul as Groom
