= Janaki Vishwanathan =

Indian film maker

Janaki Vishwanathan is an Indian film maker best known for her National Award-winning debut film Kutty (2001) in Tamil, which focuses on the issue of child labour. Her second film, Kanavu Meippada Vendum, deals with the issues faced by Devadasi women. This was screened at several film festivals

== Filmography ==
- Kutty (2001) : Tamil Film
- Kanavu Meippada Vendum (2004) : Tamil Film
- Inaintha Kaigal (2005) : Tamil Short Film
- Yeh Hai Bakrapur (2014) : Hindi Film
- Chandikaiyin Kadhai : Tamil Tele Film

== Awards ==
- 2002 Cairo International Children's Film Festival (Egypt)- Special International Jury Prize — Kutty
- 2002 National Film Awards (India)- Silver Lotus Award — Special Jury Award — Kutty
