= Mona Darling =

- Promotional Poster
- Directed by: Shashi Sudigala
- Written by: Shashi Sudigala
- Produced by: Vashu Bhagnani
- Starring: Anshuman Jha; Divya Menon; Suzanna Mukherjee; Sanjay Suri
- Edited by: Aasif Pathan
- Music by: Manish J. Tipu
- Production company: First Ray Films
- Distributed by: Pooja Entertainment
- Release date: February 24, 2017
- Country: India
- Language: Hindi

Mona Darling is a 2017 Indian horror-thriller film written and directed by Shashi Sudigala. The film stars Anshuman Jha and Divya Menon.

== Cast ==
- Anshuman Jha as Wiki
- Divya Menon as Sarah
- Suzanna Mukherjee as Mona
- Sanjay Suri as Dean of IST
