= The Forest (2009 film) =

2009 film by Ashvin Kumar

- Directed by: Ashvin Kumar
- Written by: Ashvin Kumar
- Produced by: Ashvin Kumar; Judith James
- Starring: Ankur Vikal; Javed Jaffrey; Salim Ali Zaidi; Nandana Sen; Tarun Shukla
- Cinematography: Markus Hürsch
- Edited by: Ashvin Kumar
- Music by: Matt Robertson
- Release dates: March 2009 (Cinequest San Jose); 11 May 2012
- Country: India
- Language: Hindi

The Forest is a 2009 Indian film written and directed by Ashvin Kumar and produced by Kumar and Judith James. The lead role is to Ankur Vikal and the film is shot at the Corbett National Park.

== Synopsis ==
The film begins with a couple (Pritam and Radha) from the city visiting a forest bungalow, seeking to heal their troubled, childless marriage.

Their solitude is disrupted when Radha's ex-lover, Abhishek (now a forest officer), turns up with his son and joins them which re-ignites past emotions and tensions.

Their interpersonal drama, jealousy, insecurity, and suppressed desires, plays out against an increasingly ominous backdrop: a man-eating, wounded leopard on the loose, turned desperate after being shot by poachers.

As night falls, the conflict escalates: the humans must confront not only their inner turmoil and fraught history, but also the primal terror of a wild predator. Ultimately the film becomes a raw, tense thriller that pits humans against nature, and human flaws against animal instinct.

== Cast ==
- Ankur Vikal as Pritam
- Javed Jaffrey as Abhishek
- Salim Ali Zaidi as Arjun
- Nandana Sen as Radha
- Tarun Shukla as Bhola Ram

== Reception ==
A critic from The Times of India wrote that "The Forest features excellent sound design, silences resounding with unknown dangers, music silken but unobtrusive. The film is a warning that should be watched".
