= Angrezi Mein Kehte Hain (film) =

- Theatrical release poster
- Directed by: Harish Vyas
- Screenplay by: Harish Vyas; Aryan Saha
- Produced by: Manav Malhotra; Bunty Khaan
- Starring: Sanjay Mishra; Pankaj Tripathi; Brijendra Kala; Ekavali Khanna; Anshuman Jha; Shivani Raghuvanshi
- Cinematography: Faroukh Mistry
- Edited by: Suresh Pai
- Music by: Songs: Pravin Kunwar; Oni-Adil; Ranjan Sharma; Background Score; Ranjan Sharma
- Production companies: Drumroll Pictures; Shiny Entertainment; NFDC
- Distributed by: Panorama Studios
- Release dates: 15 December 2017 (South Asian International Film Festival); 18 May 2018 (India)
- Running time: 104 minutes
- Country: India
- Language: Hindi

Angrezi Mein Kehte Hain (transl. In English we say...) is a 2017 Indian Hindi-language romantic drama film directed by Harish Vyas and written by Vyas and Aryan Saha. It was presented by the National Film Development Corporation of India. The film follows three couples and their distinct viewpoints on the concept of love.

Angrezi Mein Kehte Hain was produced by Manav Malhotra and Bunty Khaan and co-produced by Swaroop Chaturvedi. The film had its world premiere at the 14th Annual South Asian International Film Festival held in New York City on 15 December 2017, where it won the Audience Choice for the Best Film.

== Plot ==
Angrezi Mein Kehte Hain is the story of Yashwant Batra (Sanjay Mishra), a man who believes that expressing love is not a necessary requirement of a married life, a viewpoint that is not shared by his wife Kiran (Ekavali Khanna) which ultimately leads to their separation. And how he wins her back with inspiration from his young daughter Preeti (Shivani Raghuvanshi) & his happy in life Son-in-law Jugunu (Anshuman Jha).

== Cast ==
- Sanjay Mishra as Yashwant Batra
- Pankaj Tripathi as Feroz
- Ekavali Khanna as Kiran Batra
- Anshuman Jha as Jugunu
- Shivani Raghuvanshi as Preeti
- Brijendra Kala as Batti

== Production ==
=== Development ===
According to director Harish Vyas, the idea to make this film originated at a dinner that he was having with his married friends where they were sharing the stories about the incidents that culminated into their marriage. While interacting with his friends, Harish realized that he had no such anecdotes from his premarital life, his being an arranged marriage. The director says that, "These are important and special moments. I realized that these are moments that one actually creates. They don’t just happen. And it is never too late to create them in your relationship." This incident propelled Vyas and Aryan Saha to write a film about a married man who is unable to express his love in the way his wife expects him to. The director believes that the story of Angrezi Mein Kehte Hain is a reflection of almost all marriages and says that "most men of my generation struggle to express their feelings. It is particularly evident in middle class families. There is an immense struggle to just say I love you."

== Soundtrack ==
Angrezi Mein Kehte Hain

Soundtrack album by Pravin Kunwar, Oni-Adil & Ranjan Sharma
- Released: 9 May 2018
- Genre: Feature film soundtrack
- Length: 26:32
- Language: Hindi
- Label: Zee Music Company
External audio
- Audio Jukebox on YouTube

The soundtrack of Angrezi Mein Kehte Hain consists of six songs composed by Pravin Kunwar, Oni-Adil, and Ranjan Sharma, with lyrics written by Yogesh, Pratibha Tiku Sharma, Amir Khusro, and Pradip Sharma Khusro.

Tracklist
No.	Title	Lyrics	Music	Singer(s)	Length
1.	"Meri Ankhein"	Yogesh	Pravin Kunwar	Shaan, Vaishali Mhade & Pravin Kunwar	4:41
2.	"Tera Hua Main Jab Se"	Pratibha Tiku Sharma	Oni-Adil	Mohit Chauhan, Amrita Talukdar, Deeksha Toor, Parul Mishra, Dilan & Adil Rasheed	5:12
3.	"Aaj Rang Hai"	Traditional (Amir Khusro) & Yogesh	Oni-Adil	Jatinder Pal Singh, Sameer Naza, Mahesh Kumar Rao & Mustafa	4:46
4.	"Piya Mosey Rooth Gaye"	Yogesh	Pravin Kunwar	Satyendra Tripathi	5:01
5.	"Ab Maan Jao Sawariya"	Traditional	Ranjan Sharma	Mahua Chokroborty	2:54
6.	"More Banni Ke Mehendi"	Pradeep Sharma Khusro	Ranjan Sharma	Archana Thammala & Ranjan Sharma	4:06

== Release ==
Angrezi Mein Kehte Hain had its world premiere at the 14th Annual South Asian International Film Festival held in New York City on 15 December 2017. where it won the Audience Choice Best Film Award. In India Angrezi Mein Kehte Hain was the opening film of Jaipur International Film Festival 2018 which took place between 6 January 2018 – 10 January 2018. In March 2018, the film was selected to be a part of the Five Continents International Film Festival held in Venezuela and won awards in the categories of Best Indie Feature Film, Best Lead Actress Feature Film, Best Supporting Actress Feature Film, Best Cinematography Feature Film, Best Original Music Feature Film, Best Director Feature Film and Best Lead Actor Feature Film.

== Awards and nominations ==
Award	Date of Ceremony	Category	Winning Recipient(s)	Ref.
Mirchi Music Awards	16 February 2019	Upcoming Female Vocalist of The Year	Mahua Chokroborty - "Ab Maan Jao Sawaryia"	
