= Oni–Adil =

- Also known as: Aniket Kar (Oni) and Adil Rasheed
- Born: 21 April & 30 September
- Origin: Kanpur, Jaipur
- Genres: Film soundtrack
- Occupations: Music Composer; Music Producer; singer-songwriter; Musicians
- Years active: 2013–present
- Label: Zee Music Company

Oni–Adil are an Indian film music composer duo consisting of Aniket Kar (Oni) and Adil Rasheed. The duo compose music predominantly for Hindi films.

== Early life ==
Oni and Adil were born in Kanpur, Jaipur in 1988 and 1987. Their music journey started back in the year 2005 while they were pursuing their bachelor's degree in Birla Institute of Technology, Jaipur. They landed up meeting with each other while auditioning for the college band and the mutual musical spark made them start with the songwriting and composing music. As years passed by, they kept nurturing their music and performed at various college festivals which gave them a good recognition and fame.

== Career ==
Composer duo Oni –Adil started their career by composing jingles for the best of the brands like Parle-G, etc. They made their debut in Bollywood with Angrezi Mein Kehte Hain directed by Harish Vyas starring Sanjay Mishra, Pankaj Tripathi, Ekavali Khanna and Anshuman Jha.

== Discography ==
=== As composer ===
==== Films ====
S.no	Year	Song name	Movie	Singer	Lyrics	Music	Length
1	2017	Tera Hua Main Jab Se	Angrezi Mein Kehte Hain	Mohit Chauhan, Amrita Talukdar, Deeksha Toor, Parul Mishra, Dilan & Adil Rasheed	Pratibha Tiku Sharma	Oni–Adil	05:12
1	2017	Aaj Rang Hai	Angrezi Mein Kehte Hain	Jatinder Pal Singh, Sameer Naza, Mahesh Kumar Rao & Mustafa	Traditional (Amir Khusro) & Yogesh	Oni–Adil	04.46

==== Short films ====
Year	Film	Notes
2020	Adheen	Background score

== Awards and nominations ==
Year	Award	Film	Category	Result	Ref.
2018	Five Continents International Film Festival (FICOCC-13)	Angrezi Mein Kehte Hain	Best Original Music	Won	
