= Lord Curzon Ki Haveli =

2025 Indian thriller film

- Theatrical release poster
- Directed by: Anshuman Jha
- Written by: Bikas Ranjan Mishra
- Produced by: First Ray Films/Golden Ratio Films; Adya Films
- Starring: Arjun Mathur; Rasika Dugal; Zoha Rahman
- Cinematography: Ramanuj Dutta; Jean Marc Selva
- Edited by: Aasif Pathan; Manas Mittal
- Music by: Simon Fransquet
- Production companies: Golden Ratio Films; First Ray Films; Jetty Productions; Adya Films
- Distributed by: Max Marketing Limited
- Release dates: 17 August 2023 (IFFM); 10 October 2025
- Running time: 108 minutes
- Country: India
- Languages: Hindi; English

Lord Curzon Ki Haveli (transl. Lord Curzon's Mansion) is a 2023 Indian black comedy film directed by Anshuman Jha. The film is produced by Golden Ratio Films & First Ray Films. It stars Arjun Mathur, Rasika Dugal and Zoha Rahman. It had its world premiere at the Indian Film Festival of Melbourne.

It released theatrically on 10 October 2025.

== Premise ==
Four people find themselves sharing an unexpected dinner, only for Rohit to announce on arrival that he has a body hidden in his car trunk. What begins as a seemingly dark joke soon unravels into a night that will alter all of their lives forever.

== Cast ==
- Arjun Mathur as Rohit
- Rasika Dugal as Ira
- Zoha Rahman as Sanya
- Paresh Pahuja as Dr. Basukinath
- Tanmay as Pizza Delivery Guy
- Garrick Hagon as Harry Curzon

== Release ==
The trailer was released on 3 October 2025. It was released in theaters in India on 10 October 2025 with an "A certificate" from the CBFC.

== Reception ==
Anuj Kumar of The Hindu observed that "The exposition of social mores and historical elements doesn’t always integrate organically with the mystery aspect, but overall, this Haveli impresses with its form and emotional architecture." Rahul Desai of The Hollywood Reporter India commented that "A chatty chamber drama set in an English manor — does too much and says too little." Shubhra Gupta of The Indian Express gave 1 stars out of 5 and said that " There are good actors in the film, but the writing is stagey. There’s nothing that the always-watchable Rasika Dugal or Arjun Mathur can rescue."

Dhaval Roy of The Times of India gave 3 stars out of 5 and said that "While not for those seeking a mass entertainer, the intriguing premise and strong performances make this a decent watch." Kartik Bhardwaj of Cinema Express rated it 2.5/5 stars and said that "Anshuman Jha’s Hitchcockian thriller is more shock, less suspense." Deepa Gahlot of Rediff.com rated it 2.5/5 stars and observed that "Lord Curzon Ki Haveli lacks the wit and the wickedness to go anywhere with the mildly intriguing setup."

Sana Farzeen of India Today gave 1.5 stars out of 5 and said that "The film's cluttered narrative and slow pace raise questions on its emotional engagement and thematic depth." Shomini Sen of WION stated that "Lord Curzon Ki Haveli, builds an interesting premise but is unable to hold the viewers' attention throughout the course of the film." Rishabh Suri of Hindustan Times agve 2 stars out of 5 and said that "Lord Curzon Ki Haveli, directed by Anshuman Jha, struggles as a murder mystery with shallow character development and poor staging."

Aashna Nadkarni Mashable India rated it 3/5 stars and said that "All in all, the movie is a good one-time watch if you are a suspense thriller paglu." Nandini Ramnath of Scroll.in observed that "The 108-minute film, which is in both Hindi and English, feels like a play, and not a very smoothly paced one at that. Several scenes revolve around the quartet sitting around, awkwardly speaking in dialogue that is a bizarre approximation of what Indians imagine the British to sound like." Bollywood Hungama rated it 2/5 stars and said that "On the whole, LORD CURZON KI HAVELI rests on a brilliant performance by Rasika Dugal and a few amusing and dramatic moments." Grace Cyril of News 18 rated it 3/5 stars and said that "Overall, Lord Curzon Ki Haveli is a fun, twisty ride. It’s not perfect, but Rasika Dugal and the cast keep it interesting, and Jha’s direction shows real promise. Worth a watch if you like a mix of mystery, laughs, and a little Hitchcock vibe." Subhash K Jha of News 24 gave 3.5 stars out of 5 and stated that "What works are the unspoken conflicts between an unfulfilled wife and a satiated girlfriend, a prudish doctor and a free-spirited stowaway, all tied together with Beethoven playing indiscriminately in the background."
