= Chanakya (2019 film) =

2019 Indian action thriller film

- Theatrical release poster
- Directed by: Thiru
- Screenplay by: Thiru
- Dialogues by: Abburi Ravi
- Story by: Thiru
- Produced by: Rama Brahmam Sunkara
- Starring: Gopichand; Zareen Khan; Mehreen Pirzada
- Cinematography: Vetri Palanisamy
- Edited by: Marthand K. Venkatesh
- Music by: Songs: Vishal Chandrasekhar; Sricharan Pakala; Score: Sricharan Pakala
- Production company: AK Entertainments
- Release date: 4 October 2019
- Running time: 147 minutes
- Country: India
- Language: Telugu
- Box office: est. ₹20 crore

Chanakya is a 2018 Indian Telugu-language spy action thriller film directed by Thiru and produced by Rama Brahmam Sunkara under AK Entertainments banner. The film features Gopichand, Zareen Khan and Mehreen Pirzada in the lead roles, is marking Thiru's Telugu debut as director and Khan's acting debut in Telugu films, it also stars Nassar, Rajesh Khattar, Upen Patel, Sunil, Jayaprakash, Raja Chembolu and Adarsh Balakrishna in the supporting roles. The film marks the second collaboration between Gopichand & Mehreen after Pantham. The music of the film is composed by Vishal Chandrasekhar and Sricharan Pakala.

The film follows an undercover agent named Arjun, who races against time to rescue his teammates after they are kidnapped by a Pakistani terrorist named Sohail. Disavowed by his agency after his cover gets blown, he sets out on the rescue operation in Karachi. He enlists the help of another RAW agent Zubeida to accomplish the mission.

Chanakya was released theatrically on Friday, 4 October 2019 and turned out to be an average grosser, grossing over ₹20 crore at the box office.

== Plot ==
To catch Abdul Salim, the right hand of India's most wanted terrorist Ibrahim Qureshi, the RAW chief Kulkarni recruits agent Arjun and his team. Once Salim arrives at the spot, Arjun and his teammates eliminate all the guards and take Salim into their custody. Meanwhile, Arjun resumes his life as a banker named Ramakrishna and learns from Kulkarni that Salim will be shifted to prison as per the orders. Arjun warns him not to do so, fearing that there might be an attempt to rescue him. Nevertheless, Salim is dispatched in a police van accompanied by other vehicles. However, masked shooters from a chopper attack the cars and free Salim. Once he boards the chopper, the attackers are revealed to be Arjun and his teammates. Feeling Salim is not needed since his existence would be a threat to the nation's security, Arjun shoots him.

Later, when Arjun is on a date with his girlfriend Aishwarya, he is attacked by some goons, and a fight ensues, resulting in Arjun learning about the capture of his teammates. The kidnapper is none other than Sohail, the son of Ibrahim Qureshi. He challenges Arjun to come to Karachi and rescue his teammates, due to which Arjun seeks help from his agency but is disavowed due to his cover getting blown. He uses his resources to get himself into Pakistan, where he meets a RAW agent named Zubeida. Together, they plant CCTV cameras on Sohail's route to learn of his destination. Realizing that there is no signal whenever his vehicles pass, Arjun believes the traffic police commissioner to be getting information about Sohail's destination. Zubeida gets the commissioner engaged at a bar and helps Arjun digitally acquire the officer's fingerprints and voice activation to unlock his laptop. The officer learns of someone sneaking in and rushes back but in vain.

Arjun and Zubeida learn that Sohail is going to attend a function at a hotel and plan to kidnap him. When all their plans fail, Arjun shows up and manages to kidnap Sohail. However, at their secret location, Arjun and Zubeida realize that they have kidnapped Sohail's body double instead of Sohail himself. An enraged Arjun shoots him, and seeing Qureshi's henchmen coming for him, runs away, attacking them. In the ensuing chase, Arjun gets shot, while Ibrahim declares a manhunt for Arjun, who manages to hide and is eventually rescued by Zubeida. Sohail manages to retrieve the CCTV cameras set up by Zubeida and kills Arjun's friend on the camera. However, Arjun tells Zubeida to rewind the footage and learns that his friend had sent him a message through Morse code. They learn that Sohail is planning to flee Arjun's teammates and get the G8 Summit attacked so that they can frame India by showing the footage of Arjun and his teammates in Karachi. This would be seen as India's attempt to disgrace Pakistan, and India would, in turn, be disgraced. To stop this and continue Mission Chanakya, Arjun reunites with Kulkarni, who is then revealed to have told him to meet Zubeida. Using the information from other RAW agents in Karachi, Arjun manages to trace Sohail's location and beats him up. He then makes a deal with Ibrahim to arrive at the border with Arjun's teammates in exchange for Sohail's life. Once the deal is done, Ibrahim realizes that Arjun gave him Sohail's body double, who was not killed by the shooting and saved on time. With Sohail now in Indian custody, Ibrahim challenges to free him but is instead himself handed over to India. Arjun is congratulated by the RAW before he shoots the mole dead in front of his officers.

== Cast ==
- Gopichand as Arjun Srikar, an undercover RAW agent alias 'Bank' Ramakrishna, a bank officer
- Zareen Khan as Zubeida Khan, RAW Agent in Karachi
- Mehreen Pirzada as Aishwarya, the bank's most important customer, and Arjun's love interest
- Nassar as Kulkarni, chief of RAW
- Rajesh Khattar as Ibrahim Qureshi, a Pakistan-based terrorist
- Upen Patel as Sohail Ibrahim Qureshi, Qureshi's son / Body Double
- Sunil as Seenu, Bank Employee
- Jayaprakash as Central Home Minister
- Mir Sarwar as Abdul Salem, Qureshi's right-hand
- Adarsh Balakrishna as Aadi, Raw agent and Arjun's teammate
- Arjai Raw agent and Arjun's teammate
- Manush, RAW Agent and Arjun's teammate
- Raja Chembolu as Ravinder, RAW Agent and Arjun's teammate
- Swapnika as Aishwarya's friend
- Revathi as Ravinder's wife
- Karuna Bhushan as Aadi's wife
- Vineet Kumar as Karachi Transport Commissioner Mohammed Ali Khan
- Raghu Babu as Bank Manager
- Ali as Dr. Ali (Cameo)
- Bharath Reddy as Aazam Home Minister's PA, the mole from India

== Production ==
Gopichand launched his 26th project titled Chanakya in February 2019 with Tamil director Thiru, marking his Telugu debut as director and Mehreen Pirzada as leading lady. The filming began in the same month with shooting at Jaipur. Zareen Khan was cast to play a vital role in the film, marking her debut in Telugu films.

== Soundtrack ==
Chanakya

Soundtrack album by Vishal Chandrasekhar and Sricharan Pakala
- Released: 25 September 2018
- Recorded: hyderabad
- Genre: Feature film soundtrack
- Language: Telugu
- Label: Lahari Music

Vishal Chandrasekhar chronology
Jackpot (2019)	Chanakya (2019)	Kaalidas (2019)

Sricharan Pakala chronology
Evaru (2019)	Chanakya (2021)	Operation Gold Fish (2019)

The soundtrack composed by Vishal Chandrasekhar, Sricharan Pakala and lyrics by Ramajogayya Sastry.

Track listing
No.	Title	Lyrics	Music	Singer(s)	Length
1.	"Ohh My Love"	Ramajogayya Sastry	Sricharan Pakala	Chinmayi Sripada, Poojan Kohli	3:08
2.	"Darling"	Ramajogayya Sastry	Vishal Chandrasekhar	Harini	3:45
3.	"Gulabhi"	Ramajogayya Sastry	Vishal Chandrasekhar	Anurag Kulkarni	3:28
4.	"Hookah Bar-U"	Ramajogayya Sastry	Vishal Chandrasekhar	M. M. Manasi	3:08

== Release ==
Chanakya was theatrically released worldwide on 5 October 2019. The film was also dubbed and released in Hindi on television and YouTube by Wide Angle Media Pvt. Ltd. on 27 December 2020. The film was also dubbed in Malayalam as Agent Chanakya was released in 2020.

== Reception ==
=== Critical response ===
The Hans India gave the 2.5 stars out of 5 stating, "'Chanakya' is a well-treated story that is presented in an interesting way".

Neeshita Nyayapati writing for The Times of India gave the 2 stars out of 5, stating that "Chanakya is a meandering drama that seems confused about whether it wants to be a spy-thriller that takes itself way too seriously or a commercial drama that has a little bit of everything".

Hemanth Kumar writing for Firstpost gave the 2 stars out of 5, stating, "When a spy drama is treated as a masala movie where characters openly challenge each other, you know it has landed in a quagmire. And we are sucked into it too".
