= S M Sadiq =

Pakistani lyricist and poet

External videos
- (in Urdu) S M Sadiq Songwriter More Than 35,000 Songs
- (in Urdu) SM Sadiq

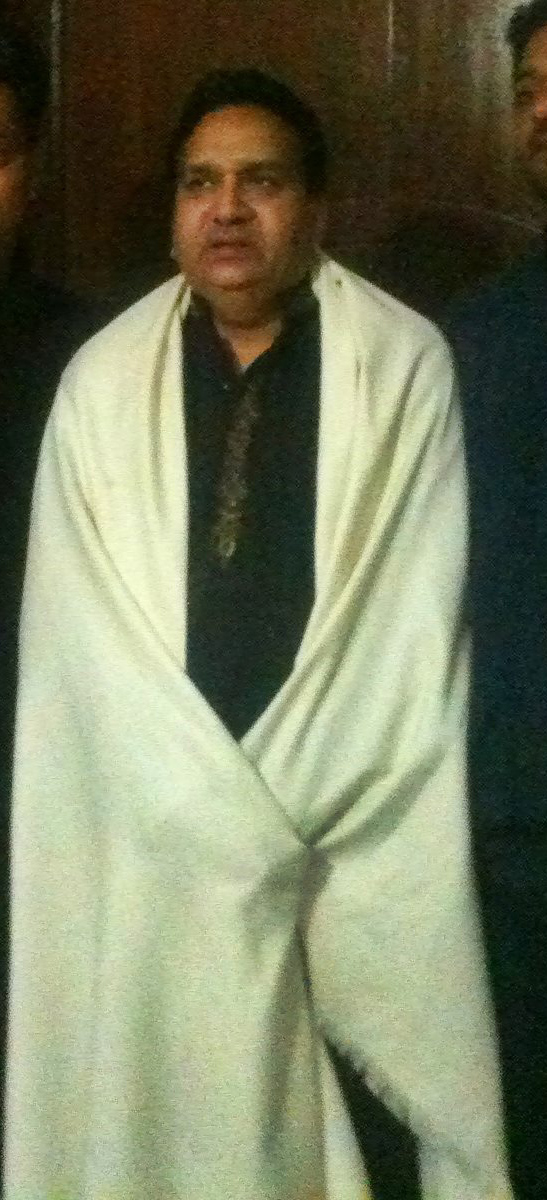
S M Sadiq in Chandigarh, Punjab, India in 2002

Sheikh Muhammad Sadiq (Urdu: شیخ محمد صادق) or S M Sadiq is a Pakistani lyricist and a poet whose written poetry has frequently been sung by Ustad Nusrat Fateh Ali Khan, and other singers like Attaullah Khan Esakhelvi, Aziz Mian, Shabnam Majeed, Shahid Ali Khan and Arif Lohar.

He has written thousands of songs in the Punjabi, Urdu and Hindi languages, and is known not only in Pakistan but also in India.

== Early life and career ==
Sheikh Muhammad Sadiq (S. M. Sadiq) was born in Faisalabad, Punjab, Pakistan. He studied only up to the 4th grade in a primary school. In an interview with Dr. Farah in a PTV morning show, he described his first meeting with Nusrat Fateh Ali Khan. He narrates that he was only 14 years old when he went to Jhang main bazar with a piece of poetry narrating a 'dastan' (story). When he reached the place where Nusrat used to practice his music, his secretary introduced him to Nusrat Fateh Ali Khan. He read Sadiq's poetry and said, "you have a rare talent but I do not sing stories; write for me something in Punjabi, preferably a spiritual qawwali." Sadiq narrates that he wrote Othe amlaan dey honay ney nabede and Ainwen Bol Na Banere Utte Kanwan, two of Nusrat's most famous qawwalis.

== Credited for these hit songs ==
- Khali Morda Nahin Data Hajveri, a Qawwali sung by Nusrat Fateh Ali Khan
- Othay Amlaan Dey Hone Ne Navede, Kissay Nahin Teri Zaat Puchhni, a Qawwali sung by Nusrat Fateh Ali Khan
- Achha Sila Diya Tuu Ney Mere Pyar Ka, sung originally by Shahid Ali Khan which was later adapted in the film Bewafa Sanam and sung by Sonu Nigam (1995)
- Bedardi se pyaar, sung by Shahid Ali Khan and was remade several times, with singers like Jubin Nautiyal remaking it.
- Mel Karade Rabba, sung by Jasbir Jassi for the Punjabi movie Mel Karade Rabba (2010)
- Jis Tan Nu Lagdi Aye", sung by Arif Lohar for Punjabi movie Jatt James Bond (2014)
- Kalle Kalle Rehan", sung by Rahat Fateh Ali Khan for Punjabi movie Jatt James Bond (2014)
- Yaad Bhuldi Nahi Teri", sung by Badar Miandad
- Dil Cheez hai Kia Jana", sung by Shabnam Majeed
- Vichar Jave Je Yaar Te Peeni Pendi A", sung by Badar Miandad
- Udd Kaleya Kawan Vey", sung by Maratab Ali

== Publications ==
- Sadiq, S.M. (2009). Apnā k̲h̲ayāl rakhnā. Lāhaur: al-Ḥamd Pablīkeshanz. OCLC 473670024. OCLC number: 473670024

== Films ==
- S M Sadiq wrote the film song lyrics of the Indian Hindi language film, Shaheed-E-Azam (2002). This film was based on the real-life story of Indian political martyr, Shaheed Bhagat Singh.
- Mel Karade Rabba (2010)
- Bewafa Sanam (1995)
- Jatt James Bond (2014)
