= J. Rajiv Choudhry =

Indian actor

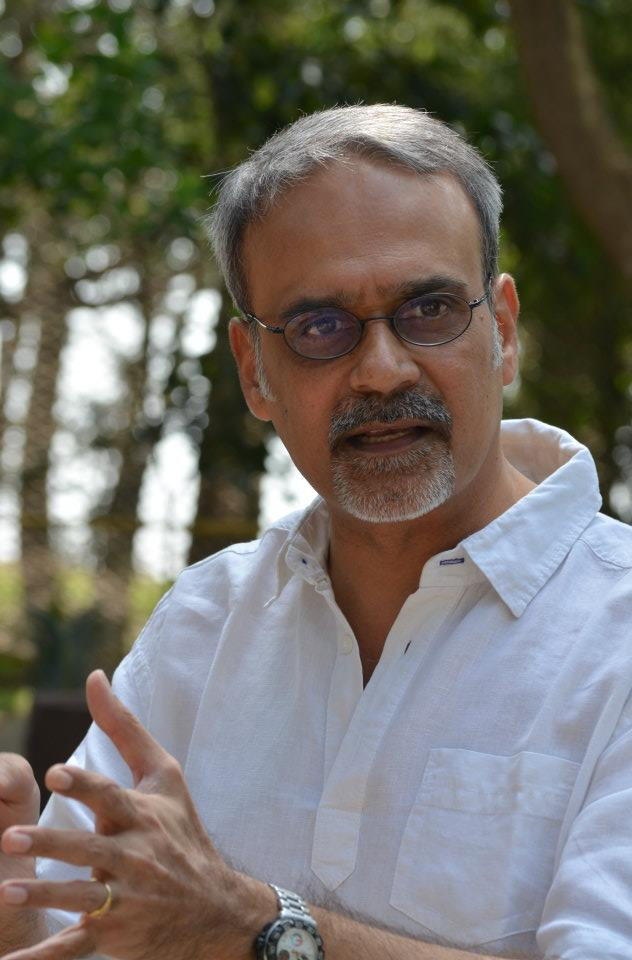
- Born: 12 April 1959 (age 67)
- Occupations: Actor, Director, Corporate Trainer
- Years active: 1969–present
- Website: www.efactor.biz

J. Rajiv Choudhry is an Indian actor, director, corporate trainer and race car driver.

Choudhry is associated with The Madras Players and has appeared in TV commercials and Tamil movies.

Choudhry uses theatre, film, art, craft, sports, adventure, simulations and other creative tools to train corporate groups and young adults in behavioural skills using experiential learning methodologies.

== Career ==
Choudhry was born in Chennai to a Punjabi family. His father, Shri Jaidevji, was an educationist and Vedic scholar. Rajiv Choudhry attended D.A.V. Boys Senior Secondary School in Gopalapuram, serving as a first school captain in 1975.

Choudhry has appeared in over 300 TV commercials, corporate films, print ads, theatre productions and feature films. His films include Minsara Kanavu, Minnale, Ullam Ketkumae, and Mayakkam Enna.

Choudhry serves as consultant to FICCI for its annual Best Animated Frames [BAF] Awards held during the FICCI FRAMES Festival. He has also served as Advisor, Moderator & Speaker Coach for TedX Chennai for 2018 & 2019.

Choudhry started rallying at the age of 18 and participated in several national rallies as part of the JK Tyres team. He placed in the top three consistently and won the national championship. Choudhry served as a Committee member, Director of the Races and also as Steward of the Madras Motor Sports Club from 1985 to 2000.

Choudhry is currently honorary vice-president of TN Arya Samaj Educational Society which runs the D.A.V Group of schools, Chennai.

== Filmography ==
Year	Film	Role	Notes
1997	Minsara Kanavu	Amalraj's doctor and friend	
2001	Minnale	Rajiv's father	
2004	Kanavu Meippada Vendum	Nandita's boss	
2005	Ullam Ketkume	Irene's father	
2006	Vettaiyaadu Vilaiyaadu	Aradhana's father	
2011	Mayakkam Enna	Sunder Ramesh's father	
2011	Engeyum Kadhal	Kamal's father	Special appearance in the song "Dhimu Dhimu"
2013	Settai	Madhumitha's father	
