= Divya Menon =

Indian actress

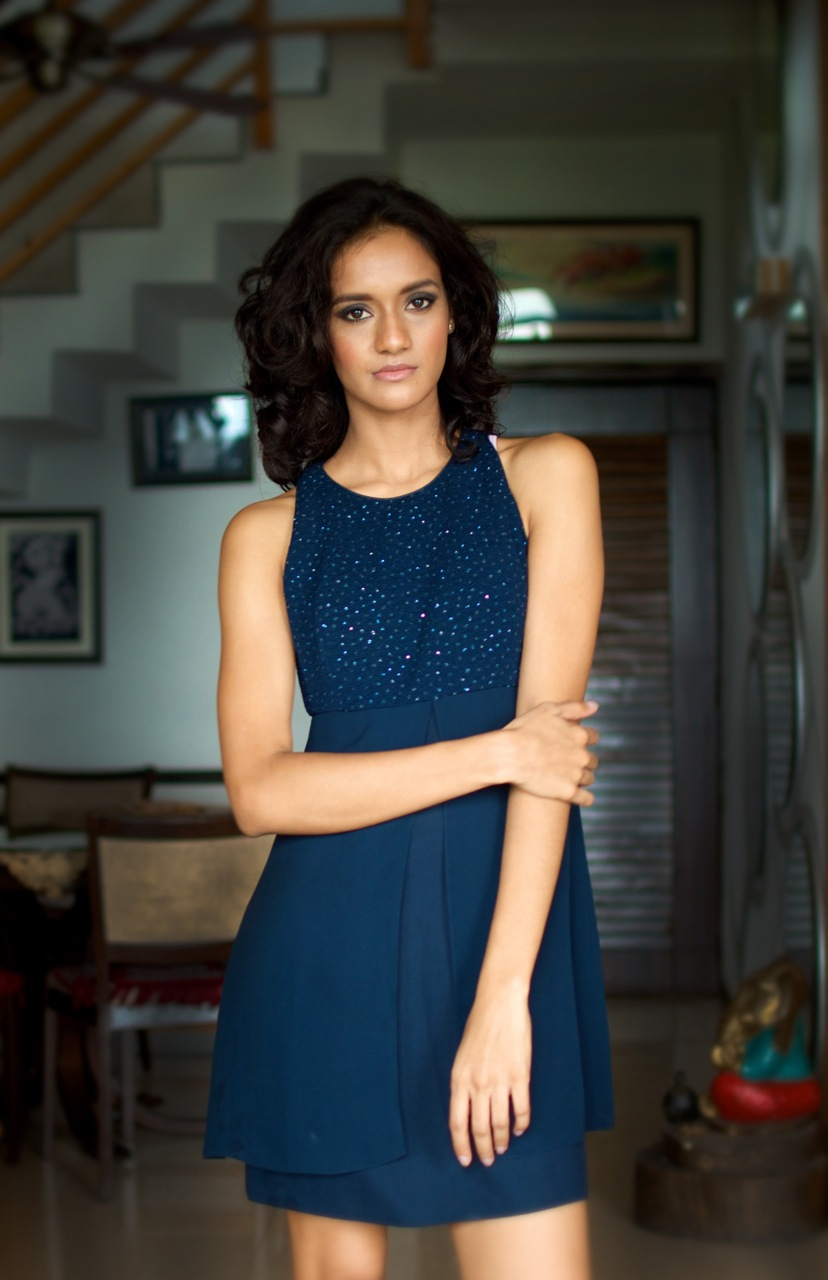
- Occupation: Actress
- Years active: 2014 – Present

Divya Menon is an actress best known for playing the character of Satyawati in Yash Raj Films and Dibakar Banerjee’s Detective Byomkesh Bakshy! Divya also starred in Shashi Sudigala's recent release Mona Darling where she was applauded for her performance.

Menon is a design graduate from NIFT Kolkata and has worked with fashion designer Sabyasachi. She is also a singer and plays guitar.

== Filmography ==
- Detective Byomkesh Bakshy! (2015) as Satyavati
- Mona Darling (2017) as Sarah
