= Lakadbaggha =

2023 Hindi-language action thriller film

- Theatrical release poster
- Directed by: Victor Mukherjee
- Written by: Alok Sharma
- Produced by: Anshuman Jha
- Starring: Anshuman Jha; Riddhi Dogra; Paresh Pahuja; Milind Soman
- Cinematography: Jean Marc Selva
- Edited by: Aasif Pathan
- Music by: Simon Fransquet
- Production company: First Ray Films
- Release date: 13 January 2023
- Running time: 125 minutes
- Country: India
- Language: Hindi

Lakadbaggha (transl. Hyena) is a 2023 Indian Hindi-language action thriller film directed by Victor Mukherjee, written by Alok Sharma and produced by First Ray Films. It stars Anshuman Jha, Riddhi Dogra, Paresh Pahuja and Milind Soman.

Lakadbaggha had its world premiere on 21 December 2022 at the prestigious Kolkata International Film Festival and its international premiere on 28 December 2022 at the HBO South Asian International Film Festival, New York. Anshuman Jha received the Best Actor award at the HBO South Asian International Film Festival for his humane portrayal of the animal lover vigilante.

The film was released on 13 January 2023 and had its European premiere as an official selection at the 20th Indisches International Film Festival at Stuttgart Germany in July 2023.

== Premise ==
Arjun Bakshi, a martial arts trainer and animal lover, becomes a vigilante after his dog Shanku goes missing. During the hunt, Arjun comes across an Indian black-striped hyena and learns about an illegal animal trade in Kolkata led by Aryan, the brother of Crime Branch officer Akshara D'Souza.

== Cast ==
- Anshuman Jha as Arjun Bakshi
- Riddhi Dogra as Akshara D'Souza
- Paresh Pahuja as Aryan D'Souza, Akshara's brother
- Milind Soman as Tarun Bakshi, Arjun's father.
- Eksha Kerung as Aryan's Bodyguard
- Bijou Thaangjam as Shopkeeper
- Kharaj Mukherjee as Arjun's uncle.
- Denzil Smith in a (Guest appearance)

== Reception ==
Lakadbaggha received mixed reviews from critics.

=== Critical response ===
Yatamanyu Narain of CNN-News18 gave 3/5 stars and wrote "Despite some flaws, Lakadbaggha will entertain you with its scrupulousness, an out-of-the-ordinary plot and top-notch performances." Anuj Kumar of The Hindu wrote "While the intentions are right and some of the fight sequences are impactful, the storytelling technique has an amateurish streak that demands too much suspension of disbelief from the audience." Sameer Salunkhe of The Telegraph wrote "Anshuman Jha-starrer Lakadbaggha is a comic book-style action movie with a dash of romance." Archika Khurana of The Times of India gave 2/5 stars and wrote "Overall, 'Lakadbaggha' had a lot of potential, but its mediocre execution reduced it to a barely passable film." Deepa Gahlot of Rediff gave 1.5/5 stars and wrote "Lakadbaggha takes up too many issues and does not do justice to them".
