= Love Exchange (film) =

- Directed by: Raj V. Shetty
- Written by: Story: Madhuri Vaidya; Screenplay: Raj V. Shetty; Lekha Trailokya; Dialogues: Ravi Kumar
- Produced by: Nadia Ali Shirazi
- Starring: See below
- Cinematography: Devendra Golatkar
- Music by: Jaidev Kumar
- Production company: Winds of Change Entertainment
- Distributed by: Winds of Change Entertainment
- Release date: 30 October 2015
- Country: India
- Language: Hindi

Love Exchange is an Indian 2015 Bollywood romantic comedy film directed by Raj V Shetty and produced by Nadia Ali Shirazi under the Winds of Change Entertainment banner. The film was released on 30 October 2015.

== Cast ==
- Mohit Madaan
- Jyoti Sharma
- Manoj Pahwa
- Darshan Jariwala
- Neelu Kohli
- Shama Deshpande
- Raju Kher
- Suchint Singh
- Sharat Sonu
- Adhvik Mahajan

== Plot ==
Love Exchange beautifully blends two diverse cultures in an entertaining, lively and convincing manner while capturing the essence of romance at the same time.

== Soundtrack ==
Love Exchange

Soundtrack album by Jaidev Kumar
- Released: 20 October 2015
- Genre: Feature film soundtrack
- Length: 19:15
- Language: Hindi
- Label: Zee Music Company

The tracks of Love Exchange were composed by Jaidev Kumar and the lyrics were written by Kumaar. The music rights were acquired by Zee Music Company.

No.	Title	Lyrics	Music	Singer(s)	Length
1.	"Automatic"	Kumaar	Jaidev Kumar	Dev Negi & Ishmeet Narula	03:40
2.	"Hosh-O-Hawas"	Kumaar	Jaidev Kumar	Shraddha Pandit	04:34
3.	"Tera Thumka"	Kumaar	Jaidev Kumar	Master Saleem, Simran & Tripat	03:48
4.	"Tujhse Door"	Kumaar	Jaidev Kumar	Javed Bashir, Shipra Goyal, Dev Negi & Sanj V	04:22
5.	"Tuchsa Datta"	Kumaar	Jaidev Kumar	Reshma Patil	02:45
Total length:					19:15
