= Om Ka Hari =

- Directed by: Harish Vyas
- Written by: Harish Vyas
- Starring: Raghubir Yadav; Anshuman Jha; Soni Razdan; Ayesha Kapur; Samta Sudiksha
- Cinematography: Rakesh Rawat
- Edited by: Aasif Pathan
- Music by: Music directors: Rajieve Sarang; Paresh Pahuja; Achal Yadav; Lyrics: Sant Kabir; Pradeep Sharma Khusro; Paresh Pahuja
- Production company: First Ray Films
- Distributed by: Cinépolis
- Release dates: 25 August 2024 (IFFM); 18 September 2026 (India)
- Running time: 143 minutes
- Country: India
- Language: Hindi

Om Ka Hari is a 2024 Indian Hindi-language comedy-drama film written and directed by Harish Vyas. Starring Raghubir Yadav, Anshuman Jha, Soni Razdan, Ayesha Kapur and Samta Sudiksha, the film follows a retired astrologer who, after a heart scare, believes he has only six days to live and seeks reconciliation with his estranged son on a journey to Varanasi.

The film was released at international film festivals under the title Hari Ka Om, including the Indisches Film Festival Stuttgart and the Indian Film Festival of Melbourne. For its theatrical release in India, the title was changed to Om Ka Hari.

The film is scheduled to be released in theatres on 18 September 2026.

== Plot ==
After surviving a heart attack, Hari Prasad, a small-town astrologer, predicts that he has only six days left. Determined to spend them in Varanasi, he drags his estranged son Om on a last journey that forces the father–son duo to confront buried resentments and unspoken love.

== Cast ==
- Raghubir Yadav as Hari Prasad
- Anshuman Jha as Om Prasad
- Soni Razdan as Renuka
- Ayesha Kapur as Priya
- Samta Sudiksha
- Jagat Rawat

== Production ==
The film is written and directed by Harish Vyas. It reunites him with actor-producer Anshuman Jha after Angrezi Mein Kehte Hain (2018) and Hum Bhi Akele, Tum Bhi Akele (2020). The story is set in Bhopal and Varanasi.

== Release ==
=== Film festival ===
The film had its world premiere as the Closing Night feature at the 21st Indisches Film Festival Stuttgart on 21 July 2025. It screened at the Indian Film Festival of Melbourne in August 2024, and later had its European premiere as the Centrepiece Gala at the UK Asian Film Festival in London on 7 May 2025.

=== Theatrical ===
The film is set to release in theatres on 18 September 2026.

== Reception ==
Early festival coverage praised the film’s focus on father–son dynamics and the chemistry between Yadav and Jha.
