= Denzil Smith =

Indian film and stage actor and producer (born 1960)

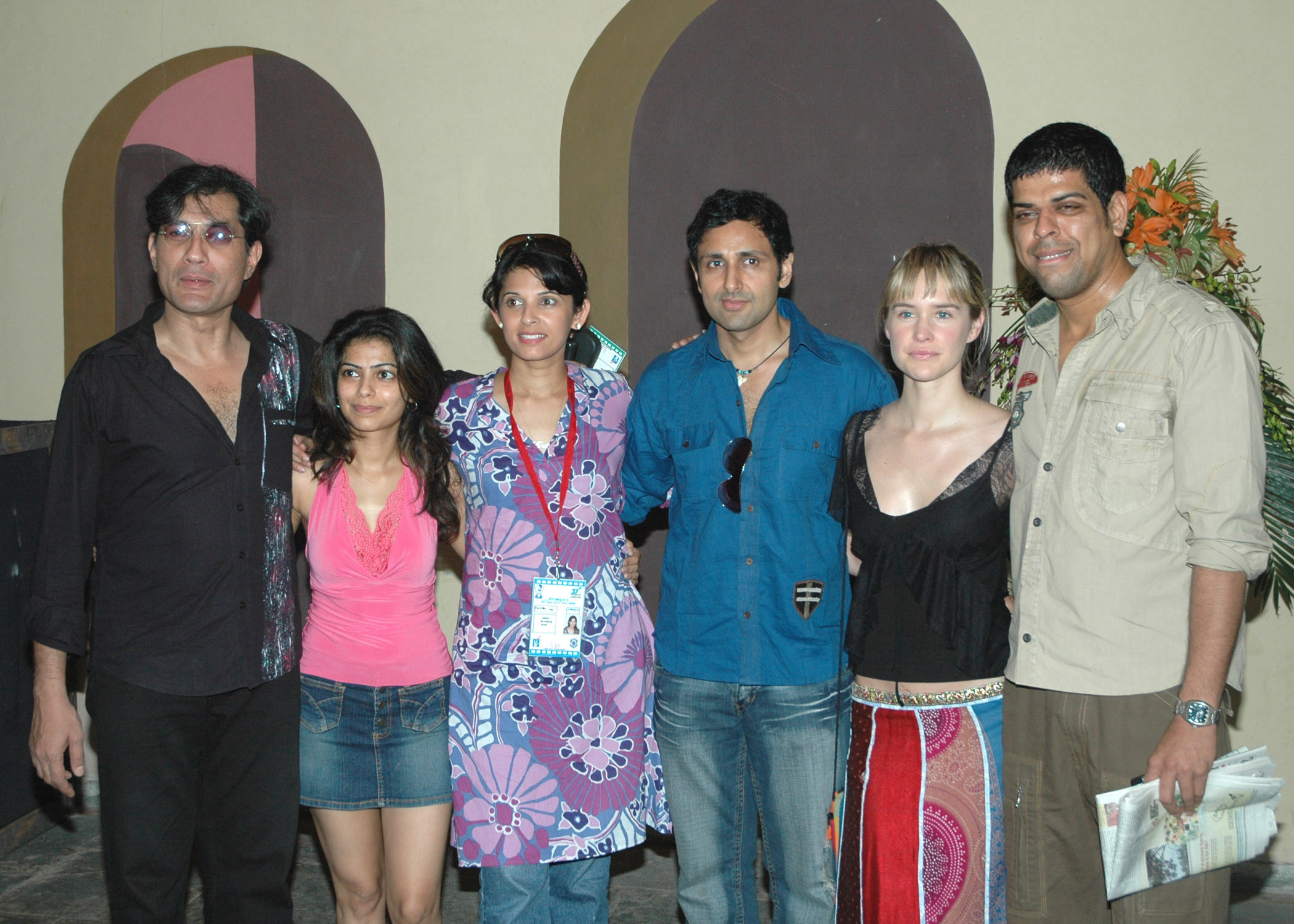
- Smith in IFFI 2006
- Born: Denzil Leonard Smith; 6 November 1960 (age 66); Mumbai, Maharashtra, India
- Other names: Denzil L Smith, Denzel Smith
- Occupation: Actor
- Years active: 1988–present
- Spouse: Carissa Hickling
- Relatives: Cheryl Roy-Smith (sister); Lionel Smith (brother)

Denzil Leonard Smith (born 6 November 1960) is an Indian film and stage actor and producer. Born to Anglo-Indian parents in Mumbai, he is known for his stage and screen roles as a character actor. Smith has acted in over 50 plays and 60 films.

His film credits include Tenet (2020), Viceroy's House (2017), Brahman Naman (2016), The Second Best Exotic Marigold Hotel (2015), The Lunchbox (2013), The Best Exotic Marigold Hotel (2011), Frozen (2007) and Paap (2003).

His notable television roles include Netflix's Delhi Crime (2019), ITV's Beecham House (2019), Amazon Prime's sitcom Mind the Malhotras (2019) and P.O.W. - Bandi Yuddh Ke (2016–2017) on Star Plus.

He has a long-standing association with both Motley Productions for Waiting for Godot and The Caine Mutiny Court-Martial, and PrimeTime Theatre for Guahar, August: Osage County and Sammy. Notable international productions include Merchants of Bollywood (2007–2010) and Life of Buddha (2014).

== Early life ==
Smith was born into an Anglo-Indian family in Mumbai, Maharashtra to Benjamin John Smith and Kathleen (Katsy) Maude Shepherd. He has an older sister Cheryl Roy-Smith, and younger brother Lionel Smith. Smith's father was a civil servant with the Government of India, and possessed a deep love for music and the arts. It was through him that Denzil was first exposed to music and theatre.

Smith's father played the accordion, piano, violin and ukulele. A talented singer, Benjamin was granted a leave of absence to represent India as part of the classical cappella Paranjoti Academy Choir for an extended tour of Europe in the 1960s. His father died suddenly when Smith was 11.

Smith completed his schooling at St Andrews in Bandra, and studied English literature at the University of Mumbai.

== Career ==
Smith began his professional career as a film executive under Indian adman and actor, Alyque Padamsee, who was then CEO of the advertising agency Lintas. In 1988, Smith quit his corporate career to focus on stage acting. He trained in voice at the National Centre for the Performing Arts, Mumbai, and was guided by Dr. Ashok Ranade and Pratap Sharma.

=== In theater ===
A pivotal play early in his theatrical career was Pearl Padamsee's Les Liaisons Dangereuse where he first worked with Naseeruddin Shah and Ratna Pathak. Shortly after this play, he became a member of Shah's Motley Productions – a theatre group formed by Naseeruddin Shah, Tom Alter and Benjamin Gilani. Smith played the role of Lucky in Samuel Beckett's Waiting for Godot with Shah, Gilani, and Kenneth Desai. He then went on to do Herman Wouk's The Caine Mutiny Court-Martial, Beckett's Endgame, The Odd Couple and several other productions. Smith then worked with Satyadev Dubey in Hindi productions such as Sambogh Se Sanyas Tak.

By 1998, he also began working extensively with Lilette Dubey's PrimeTime Theatre in productions such as On a Muggy Night in Mumbai, Zenkatha, Sammy, August: Osage County and "Gauhar" about the life of Gauhar Jaan. These plays toured both India and various cities in North America, UK and Europe, South-East Asia and Australia.

Smith also played key roles in numerous other productions such as Jawaharlal Nehru in Letters to a Daughter from Prison (directed by Vijaya Mehta and based on the 1984 publication of Nehru's letters), Jesus in Jesus Christ Superstar in Toronto, Canada, Vali and Vibishan in The Legend of Ram, Judge Brack in Hedda Gabler, and the solo performer in four monologues written and directed by Zubin Driver in Mumbai vs Mumbai.

In 2007, Smith joined All Star Artists for the Broadway style musical production The Merchants of Bollywood – written and directed by Toby Gough and choreographed by Vaibhavi Merchant – in the lead role of the grandfather, Shantilal, and then later a double role that of "a splendidly-mustachioed narrator" and the sleazy Bollywood director Tony Bakshi. There were 600 shows between 2007 and 2009 in the UK, Europe and Malaysia. and he reprised his role for a run in the UK and Lebanon in 2016. In 2017, Smith re-joined director Toby Gough, choreographer Shruti Merchant and team as the voice of Raj Pakoda in the light-hearted dance musical Taj Express.

In 2020, along with Sonali Kulkarni and Shernaz Patel, he led the cast in the role of Superintendent Daniel D'Mello in the classic Whodunnit The Mirror Crack'd by Agatha Christie, adapted by Rachel Wagstaff in an Indian version by Ayeesha Menon, directed by the British director Melly Still and produced by international theatre producer Pádraig Cusack, staged at the Jamshed Bhabha Theatre at the National Centre for the Performing Arts (India) in Mumbai.

In addition to his acting career, Smith also regularly curates theatre programming at Celebrate Bandra.

=== In film ===
Smith has worked in a range of independent, Bollywood and international film productions. One of Smith's early films was Mango Soufflé (2002), an adaptation of Mahesh Dattani's successful English stage play On a Muggy Night in Mumbai, which was centered around the lives of gay men in Mumbai. The film starring Atul Kulkarni, Rinkie Khanna, Heeba Shah and Ankur Vikal, was promoted as "first gay male film from India."

He is known for roles such as the Tibetan monk Lama Norbu in Paap (2003), directed by Pooja Bhatt and starring John Abraham, and as Tenzing in the film Frozen (2007), based in Leh and Ladakh. Among the many independent films he has worked in are Shobhayatra (2004), where he played Jawaharlal Nehru, The Memsahib (2006), Mumbai Salsa (2007), Chase (2010), Lamhaa (2010), Impatient Vivek (2011), Tripura (2011), Ajita Suchitra Veera's Ballad of Rustom (2012), John Day (2013), and Dad... Hold My Hand! (2015). In 2017, Smith played the role of the Principal in the Marathi film Manjha (2017), directed by Jatin Wagle. Recent films include Ritesh Batra's Photograph, which premiered at Sundance Film Festival in February 2019.

He's also been featured in many Bollywood films such as Ek Ajnabee (2005) with Arjun Rampal, Amitabh Bachchan and Parizaad Zorabian, Zid (2014) and Bombay Velvet (2015) directed by Anurag Kashyap with Anushka Sharma and Ranbir Kapoor, Kabir Khan's Phantom (2015) with Saif Ali Khan and Katrina Kaif. Smith appeared in the crime drama Baazaar (2018), as the Manipuri militant leader in Disney's Jagga Jasoos (2018), the emergency period action film Baadshaho (2017), comedy Happy Phirr Bhag Jayegi (2018) and as a detective in the mystery thriller Badla directed by Sujoy Ghosh and starring Amitabh Bachchan and Taapsee Pannu. Upcoming work includes Bell Bottom (2021 film) with Akshay Kumar, which was filmed in Scotland under COVID restrictions and Penthouse with Bobby Deol.

Smith has featured in several international productions that have achieved both critical and commercial success – One Night with the King (2007) with Omar Sharif and Peter O’Toole, The Lunchbox (2013) with Irrfan Khan, The Best Exotic Marigold Hotel (2011) and The Second Best Exotic Marigold Hotel (2015) with Judi Dench, Maggie Smith, Dev Patel, Bill Nighy and directed by John Madden and Brahman Naman (2016), a Netflix original release sex comedy, directed by Qaushiq Mukherjee, written by Naman Ramachandran with Shashank Arora.

Smith's most prominent international films include Christopher Nolan's Tenet with John David Washington and Robert Pattinson, where Smith plays Sanjay Singh husband of arms dealer played by Dimple Kapadia and Gurinder Chadha's Viceroy's House on India's partition in 1947 in which he plays the role of Muhammad Ali Jinnah.

Smith has also starred in Thalapathy Vijay's Leo (2023 Indian film) as a judge.

=== On television, radio and voice ===
Smith has acted in many Indian television serials as well as international tele-series. Prominent ones include ITV's Beecham House which is Gurinder Chadha's Indian period piece, Netflix's Delhi Crime directed by Richie Mehta on the Nirbhaya gang rape tragedy, renewed for Season 2. Smith also played the therapist in Amazon Prime's sitcom Mind the Malhotras (2019) and P.O.W. - Bandi Yuddh Ke (2016–2017) on Star Plus for which he won 2017 Indian Television Academy Awards Best Actor in a Negative Role. In 2019, Netflix and BBC cast Smith to play the father of serial killer Charles Sobhraj in their eight-part series The Serpent.

Smith is also in an episode of Made in Heaven (2019) on Amazon Video, C.I.D. (1997–2013) on Sony, Jassi Jaissi Koi Nahin (2012–2014), Hansa: A Love Story, Rishtey and Time Bomb 9/11 on Zee TV, The Sword of Tipu Sultan (1990) on Doordarshan, The Return of Sandokan on Italian National TV, and Samvidhaan: The Making of the Constitution of India (2014) produced by Rajya Sabha TV and directed by Shyam Benegal.

Smith regularly lends his voice for various radio dramas, documentaries and advertisements. His voice has been featured in Tiger's Eye and The Mrichhakatikaa for BBC Radio, and on Personality Hour for Times FM.

Has also dubbed in Hindi feature films like Hanuman, House of Flying Daggers, The Boolean Conspiracy, Up, Bolt, James and the Giant Peach, Amar Chitra Katha, A Bug's Life, Shoot at Sight, Making of The Mahatma, Kung Fu Hustle and Red Cliff. He has done and several voiceovers for commercials, corporate films and documentaries.

=== Media and events ===
Smith's love of music – Jazz in particular – has translated into being a regular host of jazz festivals, music and other events. He regularly hosts Jazz tribute concerts on International Jazz Day at the National Centre for the Performing Arts and Blue Frog in Mumbai. He also co-hosted the META awards in 2014 with Perizaad Zorabian.

Smith has been involved in charities such as Avehi Abacus. He also conducts voice workshops in theatre institutes and colleges in India.

=== Producer ===
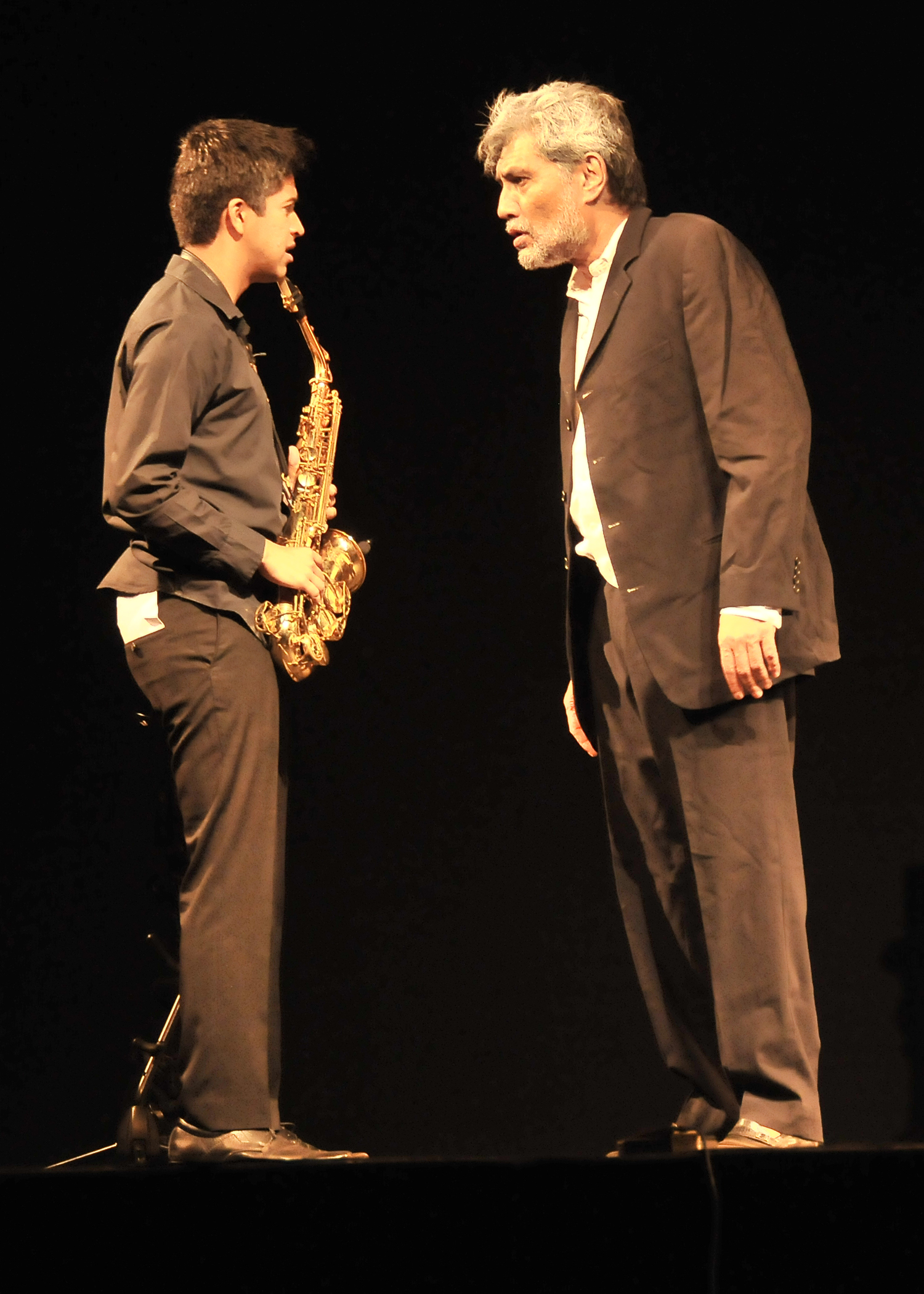
Denzil Smith (r) plays the lead of the mentor, with Rhys D'Souza as the mentee in StageSmith Productions' Bombay Jazz, a play inspired by the lives of Jazz musicians in Bombay's film industry (now popularly called Bollywood) – February 2015

Smith founded Stagesmith Productions in 2006 with an aim to produce Indian English Theatre rooted in homegrown narratives. Its first production, titled Jazz, starred actor Bhargava Krishna, saxophonist Rhys D’souza, and featured musical compositions by Merlin D’Souza. The play opened to a full-house at the Prithvi Theatre Festival in 2007, and won a 'Best Actor' award for Krishna at the Mahindra Excellence in Theatre Awards in 2008. The play has also been credited with laying the seed for Fernandes' now-iconic book on the history of Jazz music in India and Goan Jazz musicians in Bombay's film industry – Taj Mahal Foxtrot: The Story of Bombay’s Jazz Age.

In 2015, StageSmith revived Jazz, and renamed it Bombay Jazz with Smith himself playing the mentor – an amalgamation of jazz musicians Sebastian D’Souza, Chris Perry, Micky Correa, Chic Chocolate (also known as Louis Armstrong of India) Frank Fernand and Anthony Gonsalves – with saxophonist Rhys Sebastian D’Souza playing the mentee.

In 2016, StageSmith created a new production "Poetrification" dubbed as "Your moment to get smashed by some poetry & music." In the performance, Denzil Smith, Danish Husain, and a musician craft a performance of poetry, music, and banter. Denzil performs pieces by English poets from the sub-continent - Dom Moraes, AK Ramanujan, Jeet Thayil, Arundhathi Subramaniam - while Danish recites Urdu poets - Ghalib, Noon Meem Rashed, Faiz, Zehra Nigah, Afzal Ahmed Syed. Through this, Adil Manuel or Beven Fonesca weave words with music.

== Filmography ==
Year	Film / TV Series	Role	Notes
1996	The Return of Sandokan	Village Headman	Television Series
2001	Pyaar Ishq Aur Mohabbat	Mahesh Nair	
2002	Mango Souffle	Ranjith	
2004	Shobhayatra	Pandit Jawaharlal Nehru / Dwivedi	
2004	Paap	Lama Norbu	
2005	Ek Ajnabee	Lee Kap	
2005	Rog	Deputy Commissioner Kumar	
2006	The Memsahib	Prof. Neil Thakker	
2006	One Night with the King	Prince Carshena	
2007	Mumbai Salsa	Kay Kay	
2007	Frozen	Tenzing	
2008	Shaurya	Brigadier P. P. V. Nair	
2010	Lamhaa: The Untold Story of Kashmir	Brigadier Sharma	
2010	Chase	Dr. A.K. Sehgal	
2012	Ballad of Rustom	Professor	
2011	The Best Exotic Marigold Hotel	Mr. Dharuna, Viceroy Club Secretary	
2011	Tripura	Shiva	Television Film
2011	Impatient Vivek	Rameshwar	
2013	The Lunchbox	Mr Shroff	
2013	The Coffin Maker	Father John	
2013	John Day	Priest	
2013	Going Away	Ray DeCruz	
2014	Zid	Inspector Moses	
2014	Samvidhaan: The Making of the Constitution of India	Auctioneer	Television Series
2014	O Teri	Murli Manohar Mahapatra	
2015	Phantom	Haider	
2015	Dad... Hold My Hand!	Father	
2015	Bombay Velvet	Larsen	
2015	The Second Best Exotic Marigold Hotel	Mr. Dharuna, Viceroy Club Secretary	
2016	Ishq Forever	Karan	
2016	Brahman Naman	Professor Bernie (Bernard Jude Kumar Irudayasam)	Netflix Series
2017	Viceroy's House / Partition: 1947	Muhammad Ali Jinnah	
2017	Jagga Jasoos	Manipuri Militant Leader	
2017	Manjha	Principal Dsouza	
2017	Baadshaho	Col Rudra Pratap Singh	
2017	Aksar 2	Assassin	
2017	Woh Admi Bahut Kuch Jaanta Tha	Furkhan Quereshi	
2017	Black Widow: A Land Bleeds	Anthropologist	
2017	Naam Shabana		
2016–17	P.O.W. - Bandi Yuddh Ke	Lala/Jamal Rashid	Television Series
2018	Happy Phirr Bhag Jayegi	Adnan Chow	
2018	Baazaar	Kishore Wadhwa	
2018	Naa Peru Surya	Activist Politician	
2019–2022	Mind the Malhotras	Dr Gulfam Rustogi	Amazon Prime Video series
2019	Beecham House	Netflix	
2019	Photograph	Hasmukhbhai	
2019	Badla	Detective Sondhi	
2019	The Good Karma Hospital	Anish	ITV Series
2019	Made in Heaven	Mr Swarup	Amazon Prime Video series
2019	Bombairiya	Rahul Saigal (Nandini's father)	
2019	Skyfire	Nalini Ranjan Pant	ZEE5 webseries
2020	Tenet	Sanjay Singh	English film
2021	Silence... Can You Hear It?	Commission Sanjay Sharma	ZEE5 film
2021	Bell Bottom	R. N. Kao	
2021	The Serpent	Sobhraj Hatchand Bhaonani	Netflix and BBC
2021	Dybbuk	Father Gabriel	Amazon Prime Video film
2021	Hum Bhi Akele Tum Bhi Akele	MLA Tsong	Disney Hotstar film
2019 - 2025	Delhi Crime	Vishal Chaturvedi	Netflix
2023	White Ant	Ashish	Short film
2023	Lakadbaggha	ACP Crime Branch	
2023	Agent	Abhijeet Mehta	
2023	The Lady Killer	Dr. Khurana	
2023	Leo	Judge	Tamil film
2023	P I Meena	Kedar Pokhral	Amazon Prime Video series
2023	Tiger 3	Home Minister	
2023	The Railway Men	Railway Minister	Netflix series
2024	Showtime	Deven Viktor	Disney+Hotstar
2024	Bhool Bhulaiyaa 3	Maharaj	
2024	Taaza Khabar	Christopher D'Souza	Disney+Hotstar
2024	Poachers	Nilesh Sharma	Prime Video series
2025	The Ba***ds of Bollywood	Mr. Sinha	Netflix series
2025	Controll	Colonel Khan	
2025	The Confession	Bishop	
TBA	3 Monkeys	Chief Justice	Post-Production

== Dubbing roles ==
=== Animated series ===
Program title	Original voice	Character	Dub language	Original language	Number of episodes	Original airdate	Dubbed airdate	Notes
Captain Planet and the Planeteers	David Coburn	Captain Planet	Hindi	English		15 September 1990 – 11 May 1996		
Schirkoa					2022	Hawker (Voice)	Animation	

=== Live action films ===
Film title	Actor	Character	Dub language	Original language	Original year release	Dub year release	Notes
Batman Forever	Val Kilmer	Bruce Wayne / Batman	Hindi	English	1995	1995	
Batman & Robin	George Clooney	Bruce Wayne / Batman	Hindi	English	1997	1997	
The Phantom	Billy Zane	Kit; Walker / The Phantom	Hindi	English	1996	1996	
Hellboy	Corey Johnson	Agent Clay	Hindi	English	2004	2004	
V for Vendetta	Hugo Weaving	V	Hindi	English	2005	2005	
Blade: Trinity	Wesley Snipes	Eric Brooks / Blade	Hindi	English	2004	2004	
Captain America: The Winter Soldier	Robert Redford	Alexander Pierce	Hindi	English	2014	2014	
Ant-Man and the Wasp	Laurence Fishburne	Bill Foster	Hindi	English	2018	2018	
Avengers: Endgame	Robert Redford	Alexander Pierce	Hindi	English	2019	2019	
Dumbo	Alan Arkin	J. Griffin Remington	Hindi	English	2019	2019	
Tenet	Himself	Sanjay Singh	Hindi	English	2020	2020	
