= Ankur Vikal =

Indian actor

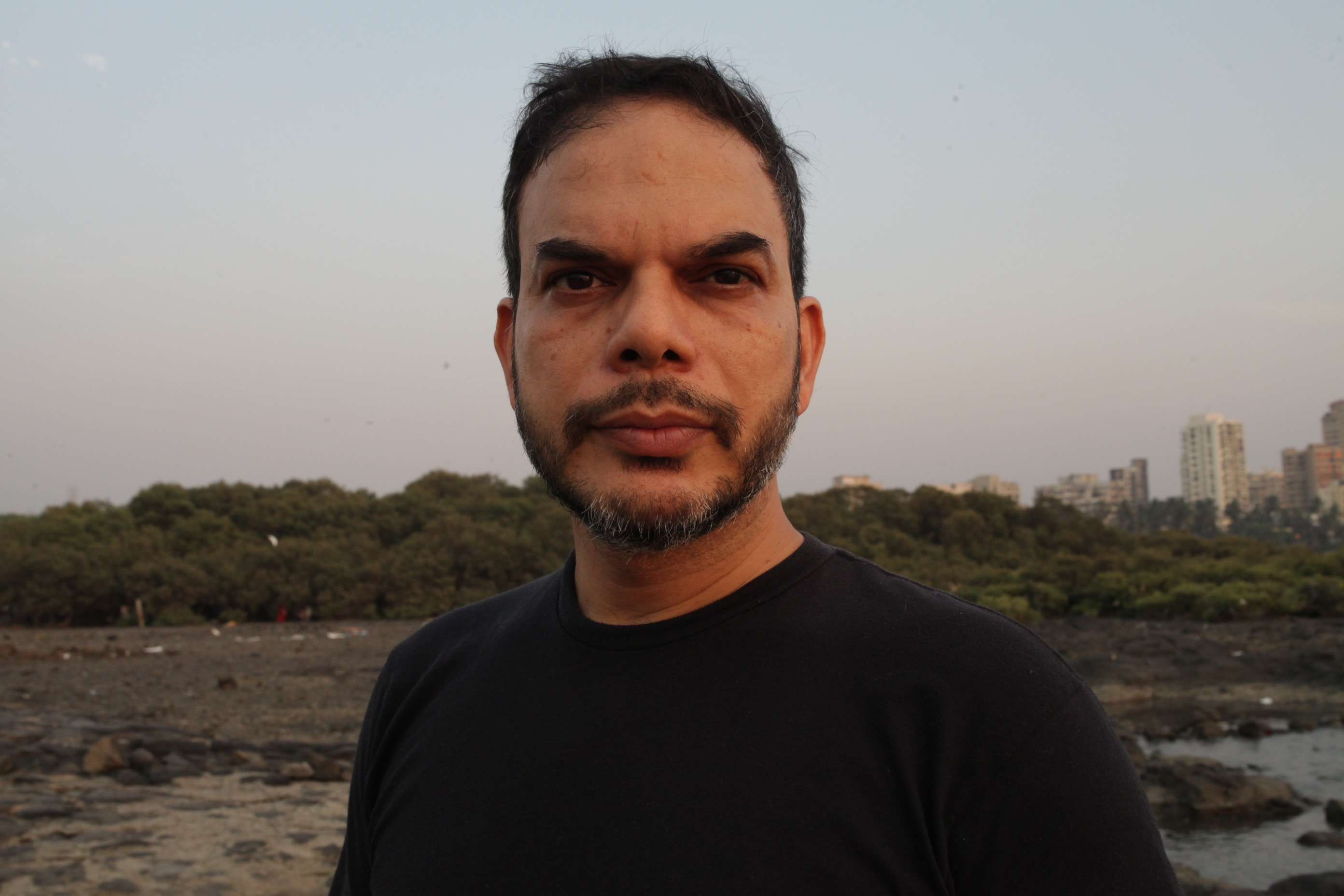
- Born: Gujarat, India
- Education: National School of Drama
- Occupation: Actor
- Years active: 2002–present
- Website: www.ankurvikal.com

Ankur Vikal is an Indian theatre and film actor.

== Career ==
He graduated from the National School of Drama (NSD), New Delhi in 2000, after studying Architecture at Maharaja Sayajirao University of Baroda. He has acted with the Motley Theatre Group in plays such as Manto Ismat Haazir Hain, Safed Jhooth Kaali Shalwar, Katha Kollage II, All Thieves, The Caine Mutiny Court-Martial, and Salome. His film career began with the Indian ground-breaking film Mango Soufflé, followed by the highly acclaimed films Maqbool and Missed Call.

Ankur played the role of Maman in Slumdog Millionaire (2008). It was nominated for ten Academy Awards in 2009 and won eight - the most for any 2008 film-including Best Picture, Best Director, and Best adapted screenplay. It won seven BAFTA awards including Best Film, five Critic's Choice Awards, and four Golden Globes. In the film, he discovers the children while they are living in the trash heaps and brings them to his Orphanage. He won a Screen Actor's Guild Award ( Outstanding performance by a Cast in a Motion Picture) for his highly acclaimed and appreciated performance as Maman.

He also played the lead in The Forest. He was most recently seen in Telugu language film Kedi and Hindi film Striker. In Tamil cinema he debuted in Mariyan (2013) where he played the role of an oil worker.

He played Yakub, the antagonist terrorist leader, in the TV Series 24.

He then worked on Nirbhaya-A play by Yael Farber for 3 years. The play was about the gang rape on a bus in Delhi on 16 December 2012. It was also about sexual abuse, patriarchy and misogyny. It won a fringe first, an Amnesty award and a heralds angel when it opened in Edinburgh. It is considered by many critics and audiences to be one of the most important works of human rights theatre in the world.

This was followed by films like Phobia with Radhika Apte, Jazbaa with Irrfan Khan, And Yaara by Tigmanshu Dhulia. His series Betaal is on Netflix and Paatal lok is on Amazon Prime. Saina by Amol Gupte, Inside Edge, Season 3 and Baahubali, before the beginning will release later this year.

== Filmography ==
- Mango Soufflé (2002) as Kamlesh
- Maqbool (2003) as Riyaz Boti
- Missed Call (2005) as Gaurav Sengupta
- Slumdog Millionaire (2008) as Maman
- The Forest (2009) as Pritam
- Striker (2010, Hindi) as Zaid
- Kedi (2010, Telugu) as Chandra
- Breaking the way (2010, Short) as Ashok
- Maryan (2013, Tamil)
- Yamdas (2014) as Darshan
- Unfreedom (2014) as Najeeb
- Bang Bang (2014, Hindi) as Shoaib
- Jazbaa (2015, Hindi) as Vijay
- Blemished Light (2015) as Najib
- Train Station (2015) as Brown (India)
- Sold (2016) as Varun
- Phobia (2016, Hindi) as Manu Malhotra
- Indu Sarkar (2017, Hindi) as Shivam
- Love Sonia (2018) as Hotel Manager
- Mehandi Circus (2019, Tamil) as Jadhav
- Cookie (2020) as Mokashe
- Yaara (2020) as Fakira/ Durrani
- Doosra (2020) as Mr.Agarwal
- Saina (2021) as Jeevan Kumar, Saina's Coach
- Bhavai (2021) as Bhurelal
- Beast (2022, Tamil) as Umar Saif
- Toolsidas Junior (2022) as K.K.Burman
- KJQ: King Jackie Queen (2026, Telugu) as Mastaan

== Television ==
- (2013) 24 - Yakub Sayeed
- (2020) Betaal Netflix Original Series - Bhunnu
- (2020) Paatal Lok Amazon Prime Video Original Series - Kana Commando
- (2021) Inside Edge (Season 3) Amazon Prime Video Original Series - Coach Azeem Khan
