= Jatt James Bond =

2014 film directed by Rohit Jugraj Chauhan

- Directed by: Rohit Jugraj Chauhan
- Written by: Jas Grewal
- Produced by: Gurdeep Dhillon
- Starring: Gippy Grewal; Zareen Khan; Gurpreet Ghuggi; Yashpal Sharma
- Cinematography: Parixit Warrier
- Edited by: Sandeep Fransis
- Music by: Jatinder Shah; Mukhtar Sahota
- Release date: 26 April 2014
- Country: India
- Language: Punjabi
- Box office: ₹35.00 crore

Jatt James Bond or JJB is a 2014 Indian Punjabi film directed by Rohit Jugraj, and starring Gippy Grewal and Zareen Khan as leads, along with Gurpreet Ghuggi, Yashpal Sharma. The music of the film is by Jatinder Shah and Mukhtar Sahota.

The film marks the Punjabi cinema debut of Bollywood actress Zareen Khan. It was released on 26 April 2014.

== Plot ==
Shinda was mistreated by his relatives, so he finds other ways to have his love Laali. Shinda and his two other friends come up with a plan to solve all of their problems. They decide to rob the local bank in an attempt to become rich.

== Cast ==
- Gippy Grewal as Sukhshindar Singh a.k.a. Shinda
- Zareen Khan as Laali
- Gurpreet Ghuggi as Binder
- Yashpal Sharma as Bant Mistri, Binder's uncle
- Rubina as Bank Employee
- Mukesh Rishi as MLA
- Vindu Dara Singh as Bank manager, Laali's Brother
- Avtar Gill as Sarpanch
- Sardar Sohi as Jarnail
- Shahbaz Khan as INS Harnek Singh
- Karamjit Anmol as Sucha Singh
- Baljinder Singh Darapuri as Snakeman,

== Production ==
In August 2013, the principal cast including Zarine Khan was announced. The film was produced by Gurdeep Dhillon under Fortune House Productions Inc. Subsequently, two songs performed by Rahat Fateh Ali Khan with lyrics by S M Sadiq were recorded. Music Director Mukhtar Sahota also provided two songs for the film featuring Arif Lohar & Rahat Fateh Ali Khan. The film went into principal photography in late October 2013.

== Release ==
The first poster of the film was released in January 2014, ahead of its release on 25 April 2014. The movie opened well across Punjab and collect more than 55 million in first 2 days of the release.

== Soundtrack ==
Jatt James Bond

Soundtrack album by Mukhtar Sahota, Jatinder Shah, Gippy Grewal, Badshah, Rahat Fateh Ali Khan, Sunidhi Chauhan and Arif Lohar
- Released: March 2014
- Genre: Film soundtrack
- Label: Speed Records
- Producer: Gurdeep Dhillon

All lyrics are written by Kumar, Happy Raikoti, SM Sadiq, Ravi Raj; all music is composed by Jatinder Shah, Mukhtar Sahota Surinder Rattan.

Track Listing
No.	Title	Lyrics	Music	Artist	Length
1.	"Jatt Diyan Tauran Ne"	Kumar	Jatinder Shah	Gippy Grewal	02:54
2.	"Chandi Di Dabbi"	Happy Raikoti	Jatinder Shah	Gippy Grewal and Sunidhi Chauhan	03:58
3.	"Kale Kale Rahan Raat Nu"	SM Sadiq	Mukhtar Sahota	Rahat Fateh Ali Khan, Sana Zulfiqar	05:48
4.	"Jis Tan Nu Lagdi Aye"	SM Sadiq	Mukhtar Sahota	Arif Lohar	05:24
5.	"Tu Meri Baby Doll"	Ravi Raj	Surinder Rattan	Gippy Grewal ft Badshah	03:16
6.	"Tera Mera Saath Ho"	SM Sadiq	Mukhtar Sahota	Rahat Fateh Ali Khan	04:15
7.	"Ek Jugni, Do Jugni"	SM Sadiq	Mukhtar Sahota	Arif Lohar	02:17
8.	"Rog Pyaar De Dilan Nu"	SM Sadiq	Mukhtar Sahota	Rahat Fateh Ali Khan, Sana Zulfiqar	05:40

== Accolades ==
Jatt James Bond won eight awards at the PTC Punjabi Film Awards in 2015.

Award Ceremony	Category	Recipients	Result
PTC Punjabi Film Awards	Best Editor	Sandeep Francis	Won
PTC Punjabi Film Awards	Best Story	Jas Grewal	Won
PTC Punjabi Film Awards	Best Popular Song of The Year	Gippy Grewal & Sunidhi Chauhan	Won
PTC Punjabi Film Awards	Best Supporting Actor	Yashpal Sharma	Won
PTC Punjabi Film Awards	Best Female Debut	Zarine Khan	Won
PTC Punjabi Film Awards	Best Debut Director	Rohit Jugraj	Won
PTC Punjabi Film Awards	Best Director	Rohit Jugraj	Won
PTC Punjabi Film Awards	Best Actor	Gippy Grewal	Won
