= Pratyush Prakash =

Indian lyricist and poet (born 1991)

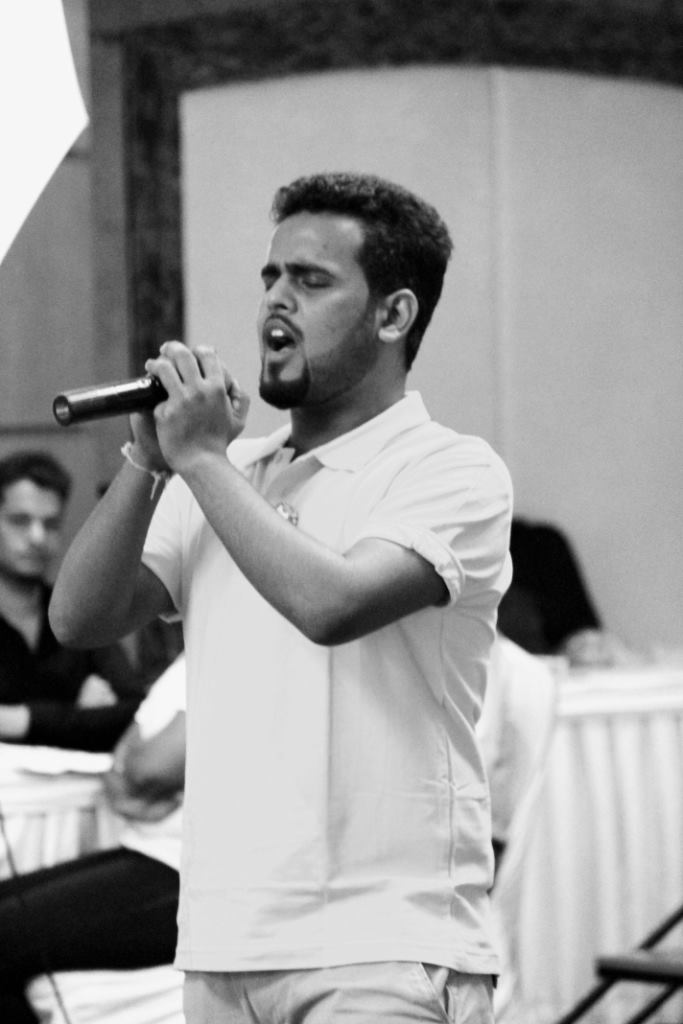
- Born: 14 December 1991; Odisha, India
- Education: D.A.V. Public School; Bharath University
- Occupation: Lyricist

Pratyush Prakash (born 14 December 1991 in Odisha, India) is an Indian lyricist, poet and Television Writer . He writes songs for Bollywood Movies. He is better known for being featured under the 'Best Original Song' category in the Oscar Contention List 2014 for Kamasutra 3D.

== Early days ==
Pratyush Singh was born in Odisha to a middle-class family. His father works as a Foreman in Mahanadi Coalfield Limited and his mother is a homemaker. He carried out his schooling in Odisha. He attended D.A.V. Public School, M.C.L. Kalinga Area (1995-2009) and studied Automobile Engineering at Bharath University, Chennai (2009–2013). After completing his graduation, he went to work for an e-Learning company as an Instructional Designer.

== Career ==
Pratyush wrote his first album at the age of 18. Later he went on writing songs for short movies and albums. The big break in his career happened when he debuted in Bollywood at the age of 22, with one of the most awaited movie, Kamasutra 3D. He wrote two songs for the movie.

He also wrote for the Rajat Kapoor and Huma Qureshi starrer movie, "X", released in 2015. One of his recently released movie is Hum Bhi Akele Tum Bhi Akele starring Zareen Khan & Anshuman Jha.

Pratyush has also worked as a writer on non-fiction shows like Kaun Banega Crorepati Season-14, Indian Idol 14, Indian Idol 15, Indian Idol 16, Family Fullhouse With Rohit Sharma, India’s Got Talent 9-11, Hip Hop India for Amazon Mx Player, Zee Rishtey Awards, India’s best dancer season-3, Dance Plus 3, Rising Star, Dance Champions, High Fever, Dance plus 4, The Voice, Dance India Dance-Battle of the champions, Dance plus 5, Indian Pro Music League, Smart Jodi & Super Dancer Chapter 5.

== Personal ==
Pratyush currently lives in Mumbai, Maharashtra.
