= Zareen Khan =

Indian actress (born 1987)

- Khan in 2023
- Born: 14 May 1987 (age 39); Mumbai, Maharashtra, India
- Other name: Zarine Khan
- Occupation: Actress
- Years active: 2010–present

Zareen Khan (born 14 May 1987) is an Indian actress who works primarily in the Hindi–language films. She made her acting debut in 2010 with the action film Veer for which she received a nomination at the Zee Cine Award for Best Female Debut and subsequently appeared in the popular item number of the 2011 action comedy film Ready and as glamorous model in the 2012 comedy Housefull 2, that ranks her highest-grossing release. Following a 2014 Punjabi film Jatt James Bond, she returned to hindi film with a starring role in the 2015 erotic thriller Hate Story 3. In 2019, Khan debuted into Telugu cinema with the action thriller Chanakya.

== Early life ==
Zareen Khan was born on 14 May 1987 in Mumbai, India, into a Pashtun family. She completed her intermediate at Rizvi College of Science, Mumbai. Zarine Khan started her career working at a call centre, followed by her stint at a corporate front desk located at the Bombay Convention & Exhibition Centre (BCEC). She also engaged in promotional work for various brands and served as an in-house model for them.

== Career ==
=== Debut and breakthrough (2010–2013) ===
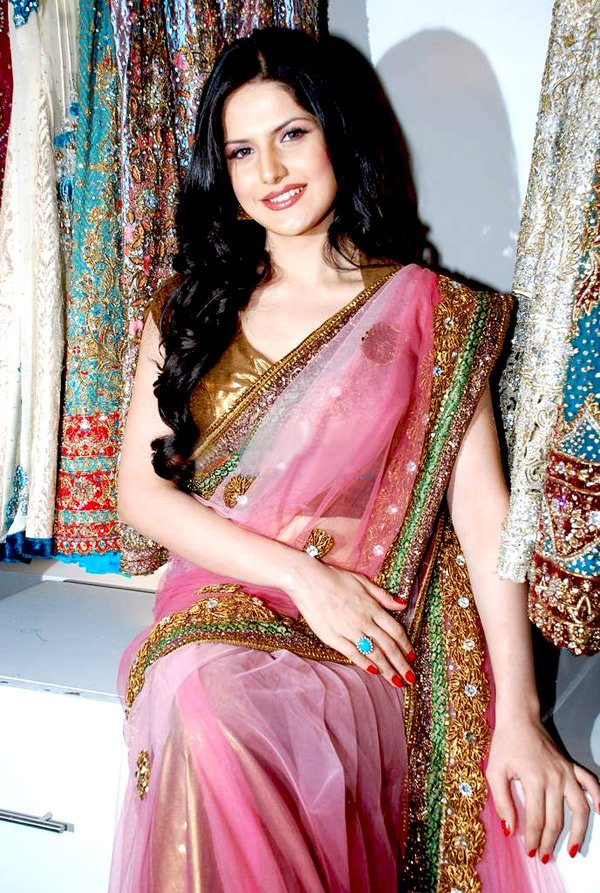
Khan in 2010

Khan's acting career began while visiting the set of Yuvvraaj at Subhash Ghai's film school Whistling Woods. Salman Khan noticed her and decided to cast her for his friend Anil Sharma's film Veer because, he said, "She looks the character – the sweet princess she is playing in Veer". After a screen test, Khan was given the lead role of Princess Yashodhara. She gained eight kilograms in order to be more convincing as a 19th-century princess. The film revolves around the 1825 Pindari movement of Rajasthan, when India was ruled by the British. Veer did not do well at the box office; however, her performance received mixed reviews from both critics and audiences. Taran Adarsh of Bollywood Hungama observed that "Zarine resembles Katrina Kaif, but wears one expression all through". Nikhat Kazmi of Times of India concluded that "Zarine is unimpressive". Rediff.com mentions that "Zarine is average". Critic Subhash K. Jha called her performance a "Zarine's charm adds to her adorable screen presence." Khan was nominated for the Zee Cine Award for Best Female Debut for her performance in the film.

In 2011, Khan did the item number "Character Dheela" with Salman Khan in Anees Bazmee's Ready, parodying characters from Mughal-e-Azam, Sholay and Shri 420 and it was the second highest-grossing Bollywood film of 2011.

Khan walked the ramp as showstopper for jewellery brand YS18 at India International Jewellery Week (IIJW), 2012. Khan's second release was Sajid Khan's comedy film Housefull 2, a sequel of Housefull and Hindi remake of the Malayalam film Mattupetti Machan. The film revolves around two cousins Henna and Bobby, the two daughters of the Kapoor family who hate each other very much, a model JLo, love interest of Jolly, the son of Jagga Daku and four Best friends Sunny, Max, Jolly, and Jai who fall in love with her. Khan played the role of JLo, a model who is in love with Jolly, played by Ritesh Deshmukh and featured her alongside an ensemble cast including Akshay Kumar, Asin, John Abraham and Jacqueline Fernandez. Khan earned praise for her performance, with Taran Adarsh stating, "Zarine act more as eye candy. She appears typical sultry and enticing selves; and is befitting in her own space." Housefull 2 ranked among the highest-grossing Bollywood films of 2012.

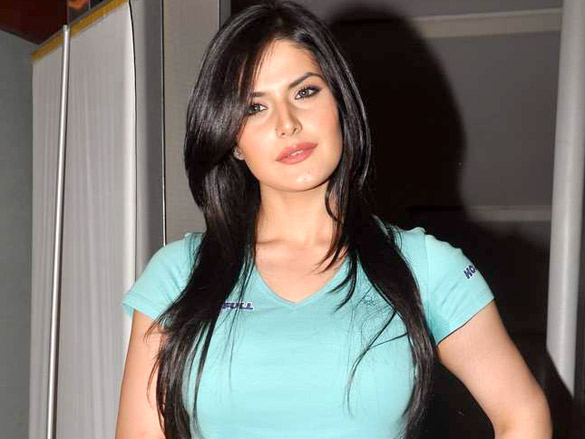
Khan at an event for Agent Vinod screening in 2012

In 2013, Khan made her Tamil debut in Vetrimaaran's Naan Rajavaga Pogiren, in which she did an item number in the song "Malgove" alongside Nakul Jaidev. She was appreciated for the song. Taran Adarsh commented, "Zarine Khan's song is high on energy."

=== Hate Story 3, hiatus and decline (2014–present) ===
Khan's first release of 2014 was Rohit Jugraj's Punjabi film Jatt James Bond, her first role outside Bollywood. She featured in the role of a Lalli, an innocent Punjabi woman alongside Gippy Grewal. The film received positive reviews from critics, and her performance was particularly praised. Film critic Komal Nahta wrote "Zarine Khan delivers an award-winning performance. She is extraordinary and lives the role of Lalli, making every scene in which she appears immensely watchable for her brilliance!"

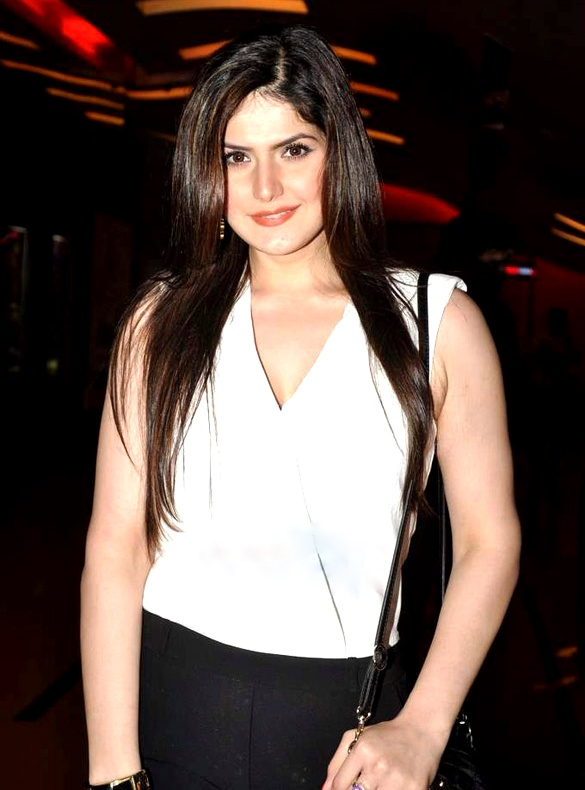
Khan at the premiere of Jobs in 2014

In 2015, Khan appeared in erotic thriller film Hate Story 3, in which she played Siya. The film was a commercial success and got Khan further recognition. She then appeared in a music video "Pyaar Manga Hai" with Ali Fazal. The song was sung by Armaan Malik and Neeti Mohan. In 2016, Khan did an item number in the film Veerappan. The same year, she also appeared in another item song named "Mahi Ve" in the film Wajah Tum Ho.

In 2017, Khan appeared in Aksar 2. In the film, she was seen romancing with Gautam Rode, and the first poster of the film was released on 4 August 2017 on YouTube. Bollywood Hungama disliked Khan's performance and wrote, ''Zareen Khan is strictly okay and though she is sizzling, it's done just for the heck of it. She tries to be the female Emraan Hashmi but it doesn't work for her. Performance-wise, she doesn't give her best shot.'' The film did not perform well at the box office.

In 2018, Khan starred in Vikram Bhatt's horror film 1921, the fourth installment in 1920 film series. Although the film received mixed reviews, it managed to recover its cost and became an ''average grosser.'' In January 2018, Khan signed Ashok Nanda's action film One Day: Justice Delivered, in which she was set to portray the role of a police officer. She was eventually replaced by Esha Gupta. In 2019, she made her Telugu debut with action-thriller film Chanakya, which received mixed reviews from critics and performed poorly at the box office. The same year, she appeared in Punjabi film Daaka alongside Gippy Grewal, which also received mixed reviews.

In 2021, Khan starred in the film Hum Bhi Akele Tum Bhi Akele with Anshuman Jha, which revolves around a unique love story about two homosexuals.

In 2025, Zareen Khan diversified her career by becoming an entrepreneur, launching her own skincare and haircare brand, Happy Hippie.

== Personal life ==
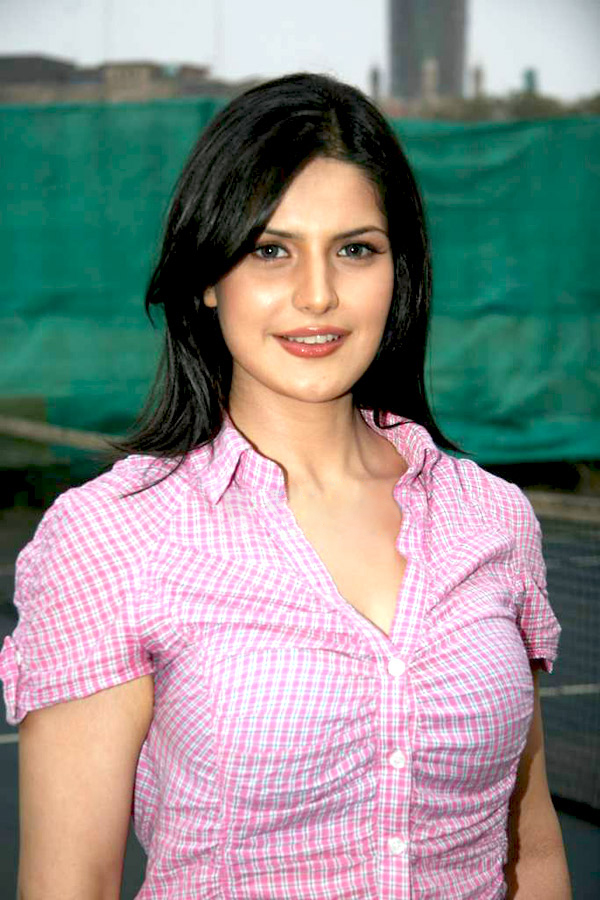
Khan in 2010

In 2021, Khan revealed that she is dating model and businessman Shivashish Mishra. They broke up in early 2024.

== Filmography ==
=== Films ===
Key
†	Denotes films that have not yet been released

- All films are in Hindi unless otherwise noted.

Year	Title	Role	Notes	Ref(s)
2010	Veer	Princess Yashodhara		
2011	Ready	Khushi Pathak	Special appearance in song "Character Dheela"	
2012	Housefull 2	Jaina Malik		
2013	Naan Rajavaga Pogiren	Malgove	Tamil film Special appearance in song "Malgove"	
2014	Jatt James Bond	Lalli	Punjabi film	
2014	DOA: Death of Amar	Journalist		
2015	Hate Story 3	Siya Diwan		
2016	Veerappan	Herself	Special appearance in song "Khallas"	
2016	Wajah Tum Ho	Herself	Special appearance in song "Maahi Ve"	
2017	Aksar 2	Sheena Roy		
2018	1921	Rose		
2019	Chanakya	Agent Zubeda	Telugu film	
2019	Daaka	Lalli	Punjabi film	
2021	Hum Bhi Akele Tum Bhi Akele	Mansi Dubey		

=== Television ===
Year	Title	Role	Notes	Ref.
2018	MTV Troll Police	Host		

=== Music video appearances ===
Year	Album	Song	Singer(s)	Notes
2016	Pyaar Manga Hai	"Pyaar Manga Hai"	Armaan Malik, Neeti Mohan	
2020	Do Vaari Jatt	"Do Vaari Jatt"	Jordan Sandhu	
2021	Chann Chann	"Chann Chann"	Jordan Sandhu	
2022	Eid Ho Jayegi	"Eid Ho Jayegi"	Javed Ali, Raghav Sachar	

== Awards and nominations ==
Year	Award	Category	Film	Result	Ref
2011	Zee Cine Awards	Best Female Debut	Veer	Nominated	
2011	Stardust Awards	Superstar of Tomorrow - Female	Veer	Nominated	
2015	PTC Punjabi Film Awards	Best Female Debut	Jatt James Bond	Won	

== See also ==
- List of Indian film actresses
