= Anshuman Jha =

Indian actor and theater director

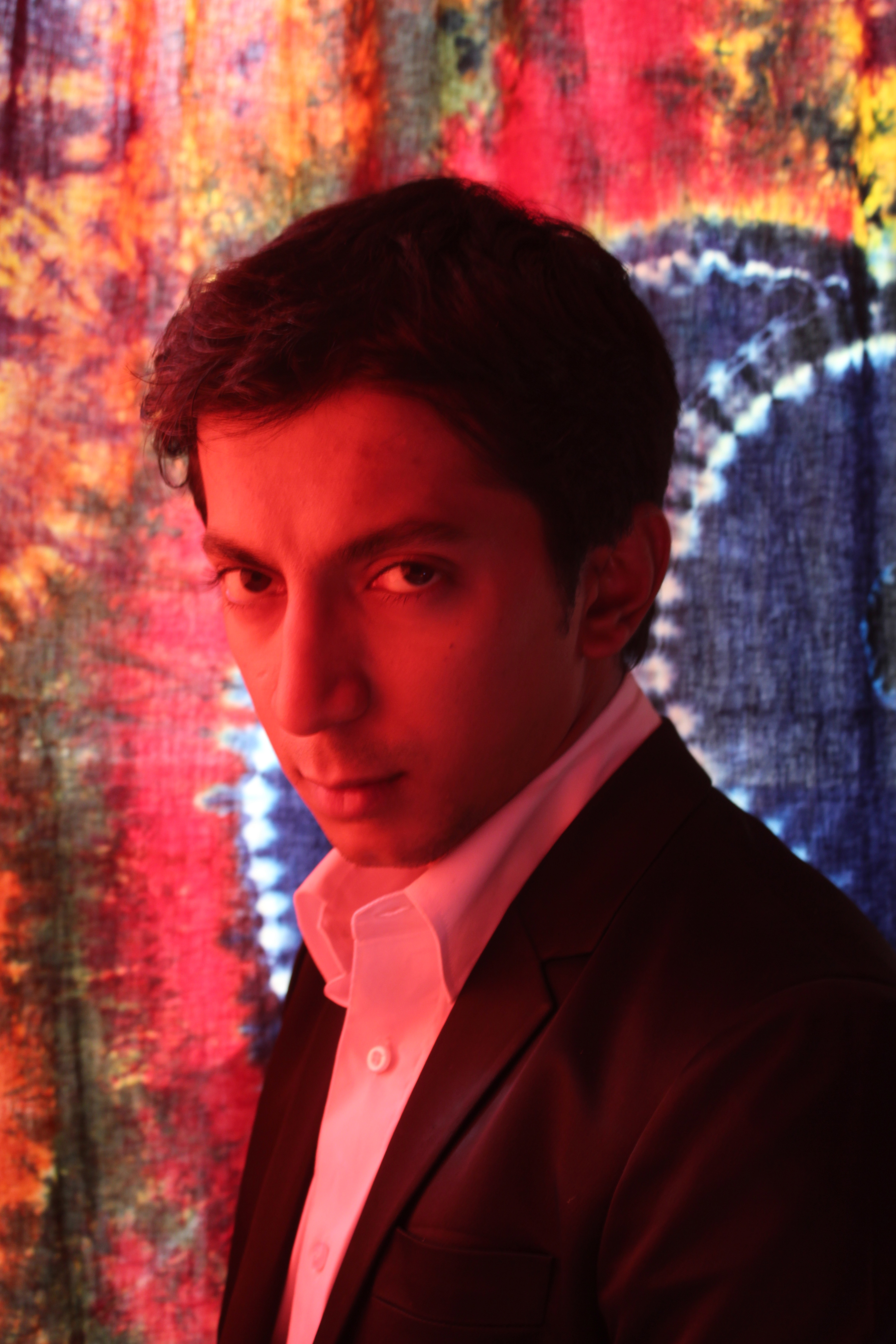
- Born: March 15, 1985 (age 41); Prayagraj, Uttar Pradesh, India
- Occupations: Film actor; theatre actor; theatre director
- Years active: 2003–present
- Spouse: Sierra Winters (m. 2022)

Anshuman Jha (born 15 March 1985) is an Indian actor who works in Hindi films and theatre. He is known for his role in Love Sex Aur Dhokha. He had been rated as one of the "Top Ten Bollywood Actors of 2010" by Rediff. He appeared in films such as Yeh Hai Bakrapur (2014), X: Past Is Present (2015), Chauranga (2016), Mona Darling (2017), Angrezi Mein Kehte Hain (2018) and No Fathers In Kashmir (2019). His 2020 Web show Mastram has had over a billion views on MX Player. He played the lead in the film Hum Bhi Akele Tum Bhi Akele (2021). His latest release, the Action-Thriller titled Lakadbaggha (2023), has won him lots of critical acclaim including the Best Actor Award as the South Asian International Film festival presented by HBO

He started his career as a producer with his film Mona Darling under his banner First Ray Films. He did his schooling from Manava Bharati India International School, New Delhi and graduated in economics from St. Xavier's College, Mumbai. He also has a diploma in acting from Barry John's Imago School of Acting. He was also voted as the "Advertising Face of the Year 2011" by CNBC-TV18's Storyboard. He was also seen as the Lead Character of "Bhola" in the Biggest Bollywood Musical of India – Jhumroo – at Kingdom of Dreams in Gurgaon from February 2016 to March 2017.

== Career ==
He began his theatre journey as a 13-year-old by coming to Mumbai from Delhi for Summertime Acting Workshops At Prithvi Theatre. Soon, he made his debut as a professional stage actor in a host of children's plays such as "Jhagrapoor" and "Lalchi" at Prithvi Theatre as a 15-year-old. Jha finished the Diploma Acting Course from Barry John's Academy as a 17-year-old, the youngest ever to have passed out of the course then. He was then cast by Barry John in his play "Its All About Money Honey" in 2002. Jha shifted his base to Mumbai as an 18-year-old and graduated from St. Xavier's College. During these three years, he worked in a host of experimental and non-experimental plays with directors like Quasar Padamsee, Joy Fernandes and Jaimini Pathak. He was assisting Subhash Ghai for a period of three years, during which he acted and directed plays such as Mr. Kolpert. His devised play Dirty Talk was directed by Nayantara Roy. It was India's representation at Contact-World Theatre Festival in 2010 at Manchester, UK. His most recent play is Ramu Ramanathan's classic "The Boy Who Stopped Smiling" where he plays the lead character.

Anshuman Jha made his feature film debut as a lead actor in Ekta Kapoor and Dibakar Banerjee's Love Sex Aur Dhokha. He has done select high-profile endorsements for Red Label and Pepsi. He also endorsed Tata Sky from 2011–12. He was seen in a series of adverts for the same "Poochne mein kya jaata hain" campaign. His second release was Kismat Love Paisa Dilli (KLPD) in 2012 and though the film tanked, he was hailed as the most entertaining thing in the film as Nunna by Filmfare. He had one release in 2013 in Boyss Toh Boyss Hain, in which he played the protagonist of a Sardar alongside Rajkumar Rao and Manu Rishi. He later appeared in the film Yeh Hai Bakrapur, released on 9 May.

Jha's recent movie Hum Bhi Akele Tum Bhi Akele was released on 9 May 2021. He plays the lead role opposite Zareen Khan. The film is about a unique love story of two homosexuals. He has also featured in the recent released MX player web series Mastram which was released in April 2020.

== Personal life ==
In July 2020, Anshuman got engaged to his American girlfriend Sierra. They got married in October 2022 in Yadkinville, North Carolina.

== Filmography ==
=== Actor ===
Year	Films	Role	Notes	Ref.
2010	Love Sex Aur Dhokha	Rahul		
2012	Kismat Love Paisa Dilli	Nunna		
2013	Boyss Toh Boyss Hain	Karan Pal Singh		
2014	Yeh Hai Bakrapur	Jaffar		
2014	Fugly	Cheeni	Special appearance	
2015	X: Past Is Present	K		
2016	Chauranga	Raghu		
2017	Mona Darling	Wiki		
2017	Pagla Ghoda	Himadri		
2018	Pari	Student	Guest appearance	
2018	Angrezi Mein Kehte Hain	Jugnoo		
2018	Babbar Ka Tabbar	Jamia	TV series	
2019	No Fathers in Kashmir	Army Major		
2020	Mastram	Rajaram	TV series	
2020	Abhay season 2	Pramod	TV series; episode 2	
2021	Hum Bhi Akele Tum Bhi Akele	Veer Pratap Randhawa		
2023	Lakadbaggha	Arjun Bakshi	Also producer	
2024	Hari Ka Om	Hari Prasad		

=== Direction ===
Year	Film	Notes	Director
2007	Black & White	Chief Assistant Director	Subhash Ghai
2008	Paying Guests	Chief Assistant Director	Paritosh Painter
2009	Peter Gaya Kaam Se	Associate Director	John Owen
2014	Kaanchi	Creative Assistant Director	Subhash Ghai
2025	Lord Curzon Ki Haveli	Director	Himself
