= Bigg Boss OTT (Hindi season 2) =

Indian reality show (2023)

- Season 2
- Eye logo of Bigg Boss OTT 2
- Presented by: Salman Khan
- No. of days: 58
- No. of housemates: 15
- Winner: Elvish Yadav
- Runner-up: Abhishek Malhan
- No. of episodes: 70

Release
- Original network: JioCinema
- Original release: 17 June – 14 August 2023

Series chronology
- ← Previous; Season 1 Next → Season 3

Bigg Boss OTT 2, also known as Bigg Boss: Over-the-Top Season 2, was the second season of the Indian reality digital series Bigg Boss OTT, which itself is a spin-off of Bigg Boss. It premiered on 17 June 2023 on JioCinema with Salman Khan as the host for the first time of OTT version. The grand finale took place on 14 August 2023 where Elvish Yadav emerged as the winner and Abhishek Malhan emerged as the runner-up. The season went on to become the most successful season in the history of Bigg Boss OTT.

== Production ==
=== Teaser ===
On 26 May 2023, JioCinema released a promotional video featuring host Salman Khan and promising an entertaining new season. The show's tagline is #IssBaarJantaHaiAsliBoss.

=== Broadcast ===
Viewers had access to 24x7 camera footage, in addition to the usual hour-long episode.

=== House ===
The house is located in Film City, Mumbai. The house design theme, 'Recycled,' features an eye structure in the garden area made of plastic water bottles and another eye in the kitchen made of used wooden spoons. Empty egg trays are also placed on a wall in the kitchen area. The theme #StayTogether was unveiled a few days before the premiere, along with the promo, and JioCinema revealed the first glimpse of the house on 15 June 2023.

For the first time, the house now has a "Vimal Zone" and a "Namkeen Zone".

=== Eye logo ===
The eye logo for this season features a mix of light and dark colours filling the pupil and lens, including dark blue, sky blue, and dark green.

== Housemate status ==
Sr	Housemates	Day entered	Day exited	Status
1	Elvish	Day 26	Day 58	Winner
2	Abhishek	Day 1	Day 58	1st Runner up
3	Manisha	Day 1	Day 58	2nd runner-up
4	Bebika	Day 1	Day 58	3rd runner-up
5	Pooja	Day 1	Day 58	4th runner-up
6	Jiya	Day 1	Day 54	Evicted
7	Avinash	Day 1	Day 50	Evicted
8	Jad	Day 1	Day 50	Evicted
9	Aashika	Day 26	Day 42	Evicted
10	Falaq	Day 1	Day 35	Evicted by Housemates
11	Cyrus	Day 1	Day 23	Walked
12	Akanksha	Day 2	Day 15	Evicted
13	Aaliya	Day 1	Day 11	Evicted
14	Palak	Day 2	Day 8	Evicted
15	Puneet	Day 1		Ejected

== Housemates ==
=== Original entrants ===
- Manisha Rani - Dancer and content creator.
- Abhishek Malhan – Content creator also known as Fukra Insaan.
- Cyrus Broacha – Comedian, actor and TV anchor. He has acted in few films like Jalwa, Roy and Fruit and Nut. He participated in reality shows Jhalak Dikhhla Jaa 2 and Fear Factor: Khatron Ke Khiladi 3.
- Jiya Shankar — Actress. She is known for her roles in Meri Hanikarak Biwi, Kaatelal & Sons and Pishachini.
- Falaq Naaz — Television actress. She is known for her role in Sasural Simar Ka.
- Jad Hadid – International model and actor from Beirut. He has acted in few films like Shootout at Wadala, Veere Di Wedding, Half Girlfriend and Laila Majnu.
- Avinash Sachdev – Television actor. He is known for Choti Bahu, Iss Pyaar Ko Kya Naam Doon? Ek Baar Phir and participating in Nach Baliye 9.
- Bebika Dhurve – Actress, dentist, astrologist and feminist. She is known for her role of Devika Oberoi in Bhagya Lakshmi.
- Aaliya Siddiqui – Theatre actress. She is mostly known as the wife of famous actor Nawazuddin Siddiqui.
- Puneet Kumar – Social media sensation, also known as Puneet Superstar. He is famous for his various memes on social media.
- Pooja Bhatt — Film actress, director and producer. She is the half-sister of Alia Bhatt and the daughter of veteran Indian filmmaker Mahesh Bhatt. She is known for acting in the musical Dil Hai Ke Manta Nahin.
- Akanksha Puri – Film actress. She is known for films like Lodde and Calendar Girls. She is the winner of the reality show Swayamvar – Mika Di Vohti.
- Palak Purswani — Television actress, model and fashion designer. She is known for participating in MTV Splitsvilla 7, and acting as Shweta in Yeh Rishtey Hain Pyaar Ke.

=== Wild card entrants ===
- Elvish Yadav – Content creator and singer. He is known for his comedy sketches, vlogs and the YouTube channels Elvish Yadav and Elvish Yadav Vlogs.
- Aashika Bhatia – Actress and social media influencer. She is known for her appearances in Hindi serials such as Meera and Parvarrish – Kuchh Khattee Kuchh Meethi. She also appeared in the film Prem Ratan Dhan Payo.

== Twists ==
=== Bigg Boss Currency ===
In this season, contestants on Bigg Boss used a currency called 'Bigg Boss Currency' to pay for their needs, with different amounts based on their ranking determined by viewer votes. The currency theme ended on Day 9.

==== Bigg Boss Currency ranking and amount given by panelists ====
Rank	Audience	Final decision by ’Janta Ki Awaz’	Bigg Boss currency amount
1	Abhishek ↓	Pooja	1,50,000
2	Puneet ↓	Cyrus	1,35,000
3	~~Akanksha~~	Avinash	1,20,010
4	Jiya ↓	Falaq	1,05,000
5	Avinash ↑	Jad	90,000
6	Jad ↑	Abhishek & Jiya	75,000
7	~~Palak~~	—N/a	60,000
8	Manisha ↔		45,000
9	Falaq ↑	Bebika	30,000
10	Cyrus ↑	Puneet	20,000
11	Aaliya ↔		10,000
12	Bebika ↑	—N/a	5,000
13	Pooja ↑	—N/a	2,500

=== BB Verse ===
Weeks	Contestants entered	Task	Result
Week 1	Cyrus	Cyrus gets to ate food till Jad reads the shown content correctly while mud being poured on him.	Jad was able to read correctly for more than a few minutes.
Week 1	Jad	Cyrus gets to ate food till Jad reads the shown content correctly while mud being poured on him.	Jad was able to read correctly for more than a few minutes.
Week 2	Abhishek	Contestants had to decide who should be evicted from three of them till the timer goes on.	Housemates lost eggs and access to bathroom for one week.
Week 2	Akanksha	Contestants had to decide who should be evicted from three of them till the timer goes on.	Housemates lost eggs and access to bathroom for one week.
Week 2	Jiya	Contestants had to decide who should be evicted from three of them till the timer goes on.	Housemates lost eggs and access to bathroom for one week.
Week 3	Abhishek	Housemates had to name one contestant whom they think should not become captain again for rest of the season.	Abhishek was abolished from Captaincy for rest of the season.
Week 3	Falaq	Housemates had to name one contestant whom they think should not become captain again for rest of the season.	Abhishek was abolished from Captaincy for rest of the season.
Week 3	Jad	Housemates had to name one contestant whom they think should not become captain again for rest of the season.	Abhishek was abolished from Captaincy for rest of the season.
Week 3	Jiya	Housemates had to name one contestant whom they think should not become captain again for rest of the season.	Abhishek was abolished from Captaincy for rest of the season.
Week 4	Aashika	Housemates had to decide whom they should think become servant.	Housemates decided that Elvish will become servant for all the housemates for one week and they also gave him three veto cards to reject any three requests by housemates.
Week 4	Elvish	Housemates had to decide whom they should think become servant.	Housemates decided that Elvish will become servant for all the housemates for one week and they also gave him three veto cards to reject any three requests by housemates.
Week 5	Jiya	She has to decide what she wants to take; Abhishek's Captaincy, Avinash's bracelet Or Pooja's bangles	She chose Abhishek's Captaincy.
Week 6	Abhishek	They had to decide one item among coffee, curds and eggs which only they both would be able to share and the rest of the two items would not come in the weekly ration. They also had to sacrifice one existing item in the house to avail the new item.	They chose eggs and sacrificed pumpkin.
Week 6	Avinash	They had to decide one item among coffee, curds and eggs which only they both would be able to share and the rest of the two items would not come in the weekly ration. They also had to sacrifice one existing item in the house to avail the new item.	They chose eggs and sacrificed pumpkin.

=== Jail punishment ===
	Week 1		Week 2	Week 3	Week 4	Week 5	Week 6	Week 7	Week 8
Punishment by	Housemates	Falaq	none	Jiya	none			Housemates	none
Punishment given to	Bebika	Aaliya	none	Manisha	none			Manisha	none
Punishment given to	Akanksha	Aaliya	none	Manisha	none			Manisha	none

== Weekly summary ==
Week 1	Entrances	On Grand Premiere, Falaq, Jiya, Abhishek, Cyrus, Manisha, Jad, Avinash, Bebika, Aaliya, Puneet and Pooja entered the house. On Day 2, Akanksha and Palak entered the house.
Week 1	Twists	As soon as Akanksha and Palak entered the house, they were nominated for eviction. A few hours later, Bigg Boss announced that the audience had to vote for one of them. Fortunately for Akanksha, she received the majority of the votes and was able to stay in the house. However, Palak still had a chance to stay by collecting 30,000 BB Currency from the other housemates. She managed to do so and earned a spot in the house.; On Day 3, Bigg Boss instructed all the housemates to contribute their BB Currency to a chest called 'Tijori'. This currency would be used collectively by everyone in the house. The total amount collected was 3,19,000 BB Currency.
Week 1	Captaincy Task	On Day 4 in the Bigg Boss house, the two content creators, Cyrus and Abhishek, were given a task by Bigg Boss to select one housemate each as a contender for captaincy. Cyrus opted for Falaq, while Abhishek chose Akanksha. Both pairs were tasked with creating an entertaining 'video' in the Activity Area, behind their prop TV and Phone screen frames. The audience would then vote to decide which content was more entertaining, and the winners would receive a reward of 2 kg of any personal ration item. Additionally, the winning creator would also secure captaincy for their partner. After the audience voted, it was Cyrus-Falaq who emerged victorious. As a result, Cyrus chose to take 2 kg of mutton.
Week 1	Captaincy Task	Winner (Captaincy Task) - Falaq Naaz
Week 1	Captaincy Task	Failed (Captaincy Task) - Akanksha Puri
Week 1	House Captain	Falaq Naaz
Week 1	Nominations	Jaadui Jungle All housemates were called into the Activity Area. Each housemate was supposed to nominate others for eviction, by paying a specific amount of BB Currency into the ‘Jaadui Wishing Gulak’.: No. of Housemates to nominate / Amount of BB Currency; 1 Housemate / 2,000; 2 Housemates / 2,500; 3 Housemates / 3,000; Total BB Currency Spent: 27,500 out of 3,19,000
Week 1	Nominations	Avinash, Bebika, Jiya and Palak were nominated for first-week eviction
Week 1	Tasks	During Day 4, Bigg Boss introduced the 'BB Vending Machine,' a new method for obtaining household ration. The vending machine was placed in the garden area. Whenever Bigg Boss played a specific sound, which sounded like items falling from a vending machine, the housemates could use their BB Currency to purchase items for their weekly ration. Every item had a varying cost. However, this system was discontinued on Day 9, along with BB Currency.: Coffee 25,000/- / Eggs 10,000/- / Bhindi (Okra) 5,000/-; Greek Yogurt 45,000/- / Tomato 15,000/- / Bread 30,000/-; Dal (Lentil) 20,000/- / Mutton 75,000/- / Onion 10,000/-; Dairy 35,000/- / Chicken 65,000/- / Potato 10,000/-; Atta (Flour) 30,000/- / Rice 40,000/- / Tea 10,000/-
Week 1	Punishments	On Day 5, Aaliya, Akanksha and Bebika were selected by housemates to be imprisoned in the Jail
Week 1	Exits	• On Day 1, Puneet Kumar was ejected by housemates from the house due to constant breaking of rules and creating a nuisance. • On Day 7, Palak Purswani was evicted after facing public votes.
Week 2	Entrances	• On Day 13, Abdu Rozik entered the house as a guest.
Week 2	Nominations	Circle of Truth In the Activity Area, all the housemates were assembled for a new round of nominations. Bigg Boss would call out the name of one housemate at a time, and their fellow housemates would have the opportunity to nominate them for eviction by activating the light in front of them and providing a reason for their decision. Falaq, as the captain, was immune from nominations, but Akanksha opted not to nominate anyone to increase her chances of getting out of jail. However, she remained vulnerable to being nominated by others.
Week 2	Nominations	Aaliya and Jiya were nominated for second-week eviction
Week 2	Nominations	Abhishek, Akanksha and Jiya were nominated for second-week eviction
Week 2	Twists	The concept of BB Currency has been abolished and this week is now known as 'Team vs Team Week'. Both teams will compete in all tasks and activities created by Bigg Boss, with the winning teams receiving luxury ration, items, and special rights. Each victory will earn the winning team a point on their scoreboard. At the end of the week, the team with the most points will be rewarded with a special ability.: Team A / Team B; Avinash / Aaliya; Bebika / Abhishek; Cyrus / Akanksha; Falaq / Jad; Manisha / Jiya; Pooja / Jiya; Tabadla: Team A / Team B; Avinash / Abhishek; Avinash / Akanksha; Cyrus / Akanksha; Falaq / Jad; Bebika / Jiya; Pooja / Manisha
Week 2	Twists	Scorecard: Team A / Team B; / ♟︎ ♟︎
Week 2	House Captain	~~Jad Hadid~~; Abhishek Malhan
Week 2	Tasks	Toy Factory The garden area was transformed into a Toy Factory for the 'Team v/s Team Week.' Each team had to create sock puppets using the available thread and needle at their workstations. During each round, the first siren sound indicated that wool, buttons, and socks were about to be sent into the house through a ramp, and puppet creation had to be paused. When the second siren sound played, only two members from each team were allowed to take as many supplies as needed. Once the supplies were taken, puppet creation could resume. Only the chosen team members could work behind the workstation to create puppets, while the rest had to wait. Pooja and Aaliya were assigned as quality-assurance managers for the opposing teams. Once one side created 10 puppets, the quality-assurance manager of the opposite team had to either 'Reject' or 'Approve' the puppets, providing a reason for any rejections. The approved and rejected puppets of each team were placed into separate boxes labelled 'Approved' and 'Rejected.' At the end of the task, the team with the most approved sock puppets would win the challenge and receive Premium Ration and the privilege of not having to do any household duties for the week. Conversely, the losing team would receive a basic ration and be responsible for performing the household duties for the week.
Week 2	Tasks	Winner - Team B (Aaliya, Abhishek, Akanksha, Jad and Jiya)
Week 2	Tasks	Failed - Team A (Avinash, Bebika, Cyrus, Falaq, Manisha and Pooja)
Week 2	Tasks	Dare Task As the final challenge of the 'Team versus Team Week,' this task will determine the ultimate winner. There will be two rounds, each lasting an hour. In the first round, Team A can dare or challenge Team B to complete a task or challenge of their choosing. The nature of the dare will be entirely up to Team A. However, Team B will have the freedom to decide whether they want to accept and complete the task or not. In the second round, roles will swap, and Team B will have the chance to dare or challenge Team A with a task of their choosing. Once again, it will be Team A's choice whether to accept or decline the challenge. After the task, viewers will vote to determine which team performed better in completing their respective challenges. The winning team, based on viewer votes, will be granted the privilege of selecting a member from their team to become the next House Captain.
Week 2	Tasks	Winner - Team B (Abhishek, Akanksha, Jad, Jiya and Manisha)
Week 2	Tasks	Failed - Team A (Avinash, Bebika, Cyrus, Falaq and Pooja)
Week 2	Punishments	On Day 11, Abhishek, Akanksha and Jiya were nominated as a punishment for discussing future nominations.
Week 2	Exits	• On Day 11, Aaliya Siddiqui was evicted after facing public votes in a mid-week eviction. • On Day 15, Akanksha Puri was evicted after facing public votes.
Week 3	Nominations	Each housemate must nominate two housemates by using the ‘Rejected’ stamp and stamping it onto the face of the housemate they want to nominate. As a result, Avinash, Bebika, Cyrus, Falaq, Jad, Jiya, and Manisha were nominated for third-week eviction.
Week 3	Nominations	After the Satta Badal Task, Avinash, Bebika, Cyrus, Falaq, Jad, Manisha and Pooja were nominated for third-week eviction
Week 3	Captaincy Task	Satta Badal - Fall of Captaincy In the garden area, there was a buzzer enclosed by a red square. All the housemates had to wait outside the red border until the siren was played. The first person to press the buzzer after the siren would get the chance to eliminate one housemate from the captaincy race. To do this, they had to walk up the Red Carpet, climb the stairs, and throw the chosen housemate's picture into the pool. The housemate whose photo remained hanging at the end would become the captain and could save themselves or another housemate from nominations. They had the option to replace the saved housemate with a safe one. The winner of the task would take all the picture magnets of the housemates and a red tick from Abhishek's profile and put them on their profile.
Week 3	Captaincy Task	Satta Badal - Torture Task In the garden area, a throne was set up for Jiya, the Captain of the house on Bigg Boss. The other housemates had to distract her and try to get her off the throne without physically violating her. The task would start when the first siren was played and would last for about 3 hours. Jiya could return to her seat when the second siren was played. The housemate who successfully managed to get Jiya off the throne during the task would become the next Captain of the house. If Jiya managed to stay on the throne until the second siren, she would keep her position as the Captain of the House.
Week 3	Captaincy Task	Winner - Jiya Shankar
Week 3	Captaincy Task	Failed - Rest of the Housemates
Week 3	House Captain	~~Abhishek Malhan~~; Jiya Shankar
Week 3	Tasks	Buzzer of Complaints In the living area, Bigg Boss placed a buzzer for the housemates to press when the first siren sounded. The first person to press the buzzer would get a chance to present their complaint about Jiya's Captaincy. Both the complainant and Jiya would select a Jury to hear the case. When the next siren sounded, the complainant's explanation would come to an end, and the Jury would deliberate to determine whether Jiya was guilty of the complaints or not. Based on the arguments presented during the task, the Jury would be responsible for making the final decision regarding Jiya's Captaincy.: Complainer / Complainer's Jury / Jiya's Jury / Guilty or Not; Bebika / Pooja / Abhishek / Not Guilty; Manisha / Abhishek / Avinash / Guilty
Week 3	Tasks	Ranking Task Housemates had to mutually decide and rank each housemate from 1-9 based on contribution: Rank / Housemate; 1 / Abhishek; 2 / Pooja; 3 / Falaq; 4 / Jiya; 5 / Avinash; 6 / Manisha; 7 / Bebika; 8 / Cyrus; 9 / Jad
Week 3	Punishments	• On Day 15, Jad Hadid was nominated by Salman Khan for next week as a punishment for breaching the rules of the show.
Week 3	Punishments	• On Day 22, Abhishek Malhan was banned from participating for becoming the captain by the housemate's decision.
Week 3	Exits	• On Day 16, Abdu Rozik exited the house.
Week 3	Exits	• On Day 22, no eviction took place.
Week 4	Entrances	On Day 26, Elvish Yadav and Aashika Bhatia entered as wild card entrants.
Week 4	Nominations	Avinash, Bebika, Falaq, Manisha and Pooja were nominated for fourth-week eviction.
Week 4	House Captain	Jiya Shankar
Week 4	Tasks	BB Junkyard During the task, a truck horn honked five times. The housemates had to choose a valuable possession to sacrifice to Jiya and Abhishek each time the horn sounded. It was up to the pair to accept or reject the offers. All accepted items were destroyed. After accepting an item, Jiya and Abhishek would reveal the name of the next nominee. Jiya was exempt from nominations because she was the house captain, while Abhishek was saved by viewers who voted on the JioCinema app.: Sacrificer / Item of Sacrifice / Accepted or Rejected / Nominee; Falaq / Perfume / Accepted / Bebika; Falaq / Family Photo / Accepted / Manisha; Pooja / Bangles / Accepted / Falaq; Avinash / Bracelet / Accepted / Pooja; Falaq / Ring / Accepted / Avinash
Week 4	Tasks	BB Tours & Travels For this task, a well-known social media influencer would enter the house as a guest every time the doorbell rang. The objective for the housemates was to win each round by completely disregarding the guest's presence. The challenge tested the housemates' ability to resist any interaction or acknowledgement of the guest. The goal was to maintain composure and focus on ignoring the guest. The round was considered successful if the housemates managed to ignore the guest throughout their stay in the house until the next doorbell rang for the next round of the task.: Guest / Ignored or Acknowledged; Dipraj Jadhav / Ignored; Miss Malini / Ignored; Snehil Mehra / Ignored; RJ Malishka / Ignored; Danny Pandit / Ignored
Week 4	Exits	• On Day 23, Cyrus Broacha walked out of the house due to health issues. • On Day 28, no eviction took place.
Week 5	Nominations	There is a large lion statue in the activity area. Whenever a specific song plays, the housemates are required to enter the activity area. Once inside, only one person can make a nomination. The person nominating may only choose the housemate whose locket they have been assigned. When a housemate is nominated, they must sit in the lion's mouth and have red liquid poured on them. As Manisha is the Captain this week, she is not eligible to be nominated or nominate another housemate. However, the housemates are allowed to discuss nominations for this task. The table below highlights the nominated housemates in red.: Housemate / Image on Locket; Aashika / Jad; Abhishek / Falaq; Avinash / Aashika; Bebika / Pooja; Elvish / Avinash; Falaq / Elvish; Jad / Jiya; Jiya / Abhishek; Pooja / Bebika
Week 5	Nominations	Avinash, Falaq, Elvish, Jad, Jiya and Aashika were nominated for fifth-week eviction.
Week 5	House Captain	Manisha Rani
Week 5	Tasks	BB Health Camp During the activity, three housemates will assume the roles of three different doctors. Each doctor must examine at least four patients and choose one of them to treat at the end of the round. In the first round, Abhishek will be the Eye Specialist and will select patients based on their lack of direction or strategy in the house. After his round, Abhishek will ring a bell and announce the four patients he has chosen to treat, then have them read a Snellen Chart. In the second round, Jiya will act as an Oral Dentist and will choose patients whose language is vulgar and offensive. At the end of her round, she must select one of her four patients and provide them with an entire beaker of mouthwash to use. Finally, Avinash will play the role of a Physiotherapist and will choose lazy housemates as his patients. At the end of his round, he will splash a bucket of water on his patient to wake them up. The table below highlights the patients who were selected for treatment in red.: Doctor / Patients; Abhishek / Falaq; Abhishek / Bebika; Abhishek / Elvish; Abhishek / Aashika; Jiya / Manisha; Jiya / Bebika; Jiya / Falaq; Jiya / Elvish; Avinash / Manisha; Avinash / Bebika; Avinash / Jad; Avinash / Aashika
Week 5	Tasks	Elvish Ka Raj Elvish has completed his BB Verse punishment and is now in charge of directing the other house residents. In the garden, there is a designated throne for Elvish where he will oversee three rounds of tasks. When the trumpet sounds, all housemates must gather around the throne. Elvish will then point out any mistakes made by the residents in their household duties. When the whistle sounds, the housemates must march around the garden area twice while chanting "Captain Elvish ki Jai Ho" (meaning "Long Live Captain Elvish"). When the buzzer sounds, the housemates must line up in the garden area, and Elvish will choose one housemate. This chosen housemate must sit on the "Video of Shame" chair and praise Elvish while saying negative things about themselves. This video will then be uploaded to social media.
Week 5	Tasks	The upcoming captain for next week will be determined through a task. There are five candidates for the captaincy, namely Avinash, Bebika, Falaq, Jad, and Pooja. They need to mold their 'BB' signs using clay in the garden area. The first siren sound signals the start of each round, and candidates can only begin shaping their signs then. The second siren sound signals the end of the round. The supervisor, Abhishek, will evaluate each sign and declare the winner for that round based on the best-shaped sign. The winner of each round will remove the image of the candidate they want to eliminate from the race to become the captain from the board placed in the garden area. The task will continue in the next round. The candidate whose image remains until the final round will become the captain for the next week. The other housemates, including Abhishek, can help shape the candidate they support but cannot defend their signs from others' interference.
Week 5	Tasks	Winner (Captaincy Task) - Pooja Bhatt
Week 5	Tasks	Failed (Captaincy Task) - Avinash Sachdev, Bebika Dhurve, Falaq Naaz and Jad Hadid
Week 5	Exits	• On Day 36, Falaq Naaz got evicted after facing housemate's votes.
Week 6	Twists	Pooja Got A Power To Save One Contestant By Giving Green Apple And She Chose Abhishek To Save
Week 6	Twists	Since Elvish and Jiya had the same amount of toys and pearls in the Toy Shop Task, Bigg Boss asked the rest of the housemates if either of the, should receive Ticket To Finale, or nobody at all should receive the opportunity, The Housemates chose that nobody should receive the Ticket to Finale.
Week 6	Nominations	Nominations Ka Jaadui Jungle The activity area turned into a magical Jaadui Jungle, complete with a massive tree loaded with red apples. Pooja was chosen as the jungle's guard. Whenever Bigg Boss called a housemate's name, they had to head to the tree. Pooja was there to dish out a minimum of one and a maximum of three apples. Each apple indicated how many fellow housemates that person could nominate for eviction. Dangling amid the apples was a single green one. Pooja could use this special green apple to rescue a housemate from the threat of nominations. Pooja chose Abhishek and saved him from nominations. Since Pooja was the captain, she couldn't be nominated for eviction.
Week 6	Nominations	Manisha And Aashika were nominated for sixth-week nominations
Week 6	House Captain	Pooja Bhatt
Week 6	Tasks	Angels v/s Devils In this task, there are two teams: Angels and Devils. The Angel's team included Abhishek, Avinash, Jad, and Manisha, while the Devil's team included Aashika, Bebika, Elvish, and Jiya. The Angels have to follow a set of six rules: 1. The Angels must speak softly at all times.; 2. The Angels must remain calm and not get angry.; 3. The Angels must refrain from crying.; 4. The Angels should address others using 'Aap' (Hindi: formal for "you") .; 5. The Angels must always respond to others and never ignore anyone.; 6. The Angels can only eat bland food.; The Devils' objective is to make the Angels break these rules. The Devils can target one Angel at a time. If an Angel breaks a rule, the task continues, and the Angel isn't eliminated. Pooja supervises the task. At the end of the task, Pooja decides the winner. The winning team gets a luxury meal as their reward.: Rule Broken by Angels / Rule Broken By; The Angels must refrain from crying / Manisha
Week 6	Tasks	Winner (Angels v/s Devils Task) - Devils (Aashika, Bebika, Elvish and Jiya)
Week 6	Tasks	Failed (Angels v/s Devils Task) - Angels (Abhishek, Avinash, Jad and Manisha)
Week 6	Tasks	Ticket To Finale - Viral Videos In this task, three teams are participating: Team A - Avinash, Jad, and Aashika Team B - Pooja, Abhishek, and Manisha Team C - Elvish, Bebika, and Jiya Each round starts when the first buzzer is played. In the first round, Team A attempts to entertain the audience. When the second buzzer sounds, it's Team B's turn to engage the audience. Similarly, when the third buzzer is played, it's Team C's opportunity to captivate the audience. Following the performances of each team, the audience votes for their favorite. The team that accumulates the highest number of votes wins the privilege to participate in the final "Ticket to Finale" Task.
Week 6	Tasks	Winner (Viral Videos Task) - Team C (Elvish, Bebika and Jiya)
Week 6	Tasks	Failed (Viral Videos Task) - Team A & B (Aashika, Abhishek, Avinash, Jad, Manisha and Pooja)
Week 6	Tasks	Since Team C won the previous task, only Elvish, Bebika, and Jiya can participate as candidates for the Ticket To Finale in this task. The winner of this task not only wins the Ticket to Finale but also becomes the Captain of the house. In the garden area, there are three toy shops, one for each of the candidates. Bebika, Elvish and Jiya were the shopkeepers. When the horn sounds, it indicates that the BB Warehouse is restocked with toys, and the shopkeepers can go and collect their toys for their shops. The rest of the housemates have bags full of pearls used as currency to buy these toys from the toy shops. The price of the toys is entirely up to the shopkeeper and the housemate's negotiation skills. The shopkeeper must always place the pearls they earn, in a steel container, present at their shop. When the sound of kids laughing is played, the housemates can buy toys in return for pearls from their chosen shops. When the sound of a shuttle going down is played, the housemates can steal toys and pearls from any shop, and the shopkeeper has to step out of the shop. This continues until the next kids laughing sound is played.
Week 6	Tasks	No winner
Week 6	Tasks	Ration Task In this task, Pooja auditions the housemates. Each time the chime sound is played, Bigg Boss announces the role Pooja has to cast for. Pooja's office setup opens up in the activity area. She announces the names of the housemates who could fit into that role and invites them for auditions. Bigg Boss calls in a housemate to Pooja's office one by one for the audition. After each audition, Pooja announces which housemate she believes fits the role. She then places that housemate's photo next to their designated role on the board in her office. Pooja's casting process is observed and judged by the audience. At the end of the task, the audience votes to decide whether they agree with Pooja's casting choices or not. If the audience agrees, the housemates receive premium ration. If not, they receive basic ration.
Week 6	Tasks	The audience disagrees with Pooja's casting decisions; as a result, the housemates receive basic ration.
Week 6	Exits	• On Day 42, Aashika Bhatia was evicted after facing public votes.
Week 7	Nominations	Room of Dilemma Bigg Boss calls a pair of housemates into the activity area, which is set up as the 'Room of Dilemma'. In this room, there are cutouts of two housemates, each with a buzzer placed in front of them. The pair of housemates facing the dilemma must mutually agree and decide to nominate one of the two housemates whose cutouts are present. Once they make their decision, they press the buzzer in front of the chosen housemate's cutout to indicate their nomination.: Pair of Housemates / Nominees; Elvish-Bebika / Jiya / Pooja; Abhishek-Manisha / Elvish / Jad; Pooja-Avinash / Bebika / Manisha; Jad-Jiya / Avinash / Abhishek; Housemates in Red were nominated.
Week 7	Nominations	Avinash, Jad, Jiya and Manisha were nominated for the seventh-week eviction
Week 7	House Captain	Abhishek Malhan
Week 7	Captaincy Task	During the BB Hotel Task, Pooja and Abhishek emerged as the top performers by collecting the maximum number of stars. As a result, they were the only contenders who could participate in the final Captaincy Task. The task was set up in the garden area, which had three ramps descending from the ceiling. Whenever a bike bell sound was played, fruits would roll down these ramps. The remaining housemates had the responsibility of collecting the fruits and deciding whether to place them in Pooja or Abhishek's basket. This choice was entirely up to them. Only Pooja and Abhishek were authorized to remove fruits from each other's baskets, and they had the responsibility of guarding their baskets. The objective of this task was to collect as many fruits as possible and secure them in their respective baskets. At the end of the task, the housemate with the highest number of fruits in their basket would be declared the final Captain of the house and the first finalist of the season.
Week 7	Captaincy Task	Winner - Abhishek Malhan
Week 7	Captaincy Task	Failed - Pooja Bhatt
Week 7	Tasks	Family Week - BB Hotel In this task, the housemates have a chance to meet their family members. The house is transformed into the 'BB Hotel'. Bigg Boss announces each round, and the hotel manager, Abhishek, decides the staff role for each housemate. The roles include one receptionist, two chefs, and four housekeepers. After the roles are decided, Abhishek places the names of the housemates next to their assigned jobs on a board in the garden area. Then, the guests, who are the family members, enter the house. Once the guests' time is up, they give a star to a housemate who isn't their family member. At the end of the task, the two housemates with the most stars become candidates for the next week's Captaincy.: Housemate / Guest/Family Member / Star Given to; Avinash / Pooja Sachdev - Mother / Pooja; Manisha / Manoj Kumar Chandi - Father / Abhishek; Abhishek / Dimple Malhan - Mother / Elvish; Jiya / Surekha Gavli - Mother / Pooja; Pooja / Mahesh Bhatt - Father / Bebika; Elvish / Ram Avtar Yadav - Father / Abhishek; Bebika / Shriram Dhurve - Father / Pooja; Housemate / Total Stars; Avinash / 0; Manisha / 0; Abhishek / ⭐⭐; Jiya / 0; Pooja / ⭐⭐⭐; Elvish / ⭐; Bebika / ⭐
Week 7	Tasks	Winners (BB Hotel Task) - Abhishek Malhan and Pooja Bhatt
Week 7	Tasks	Failed (BB Hotel Task) - Rest of the housemates
Week 7	Tasks	Ration Task - Punishment Zone A task consisting of three rounds was conducted in the garden area, where a punishment zone was set up. In each round, Bigg Boss announced certain criteria or characteristics of a housemate, and Abhishek was responsible for selecting a housemate who he thought best met the criteria. After that, Bigg Boss announced one of three punishments: 'Laundry Zone', 'Boot Polish', or 'Joker Zone'. The housemate picked by Abhishek had to complete the assigned punishment until Bigg Boss declared its end. The better Abhishek's selection was in choosing the housemate who fit the criteria, the better the ration they would receive.: Criteria / Housemate Chosen By Abhishek / Punishment / Status; Who Played the Game the Worst / Bebika / Laundry Zone / Completed; Who Entered the House as a Star, But Now is Irrelevant / Manisha / Boot Polish / Completed; Who Gossips and Doesn't Voice Out Their Opinions Upfront / Avinash and Jiya / Jokers Zone / Incomplete
Week 7	Tasks	Because the task was not completed, basic ration was granted.
Week 7	Exits	On Day 49, Jad Hadid was evicted after facing public votes.; On Day 49, Avinash Sachdev was evicted after facing public votes.
Week 8	Twists	None
Week 8	Nominations	In this task, there are three teams: Elvish-Manisha, Abhishek-Jiya, and Pooja-Bebika. The activity area is transformed into the 'Room of Truth'. In each round, Bigg Boss announces which pair has to perform. One housemate from the pair goes into the Room of Truth and talks about the other housemates and their journey. The other person in the pair sits in the living area and counts to twenty-seven minutes. Once they believe that twenty-seven minutes have passed, they walk into the Room of Truth and hit the gong to signal the end of the twenty-seven minutes.: Pairs / Time; Pooja-Bebika / 30:24 Min; Abhishek-Jiya / 39:55 Min; Elvish-Manisha / 38:41 Min; Housemates in Red were nominated. At the conclusion, the pair with the closest time to twenty-seven minutes wins the task and becomes safe from final nominations. They also become the next finalists of the show. The remaining pairs would be nominated. Abhishek, being the Captain, cannot be nominated.
Week 8	Nominations	Elvish, Manisha and Jiya were nominated for final-week eviction.
Week 8	House Captain	Abhishek Malhan
Week 8	Tasks	None
Week 8	Exits	On Day 54, Jiya Shankar was evicted after facing public votes for a mid-week eviction.
Day 59 Grand Finale
4th Runner Up		Pooja Bhatt
3rd Runner-up		Bebika Dhurve
2nd Runner-up		Manisha Rani
1st Runner-up		Abhishek Malhan
Winner		Elvish Yadav

== Nominations table ==
	Week 1			Week 2		Week 3		Week 4	Week 5		Week 6	Week 7	Week 8		
	Day 1	Day 2	Day 3	Day 9	Day 11	Day 16	Day 18	Week 4	Day 31	Day 36	Week 6	Week 7	Day 54		Day 59
Nominees for Captaincy	No Captain			Akanksha; Falaq		Abhishek; Akanksha; Jiya; Jad; Manisha	Abhishek; Avinash; Bebika; Cyrus; Falaq; Jiya; Manisha; Pooja	No; Nominees	Avinash; Manisha	~~Elvish~~; Avinash; Bebika; Falaq; Jad; Pooja		Bebika; Elvish; Jiya	Abhishek; Pooja		No Captain
House Captain	No Captain			Falaq		~~Jad~~; Abhishek	~~Abhishek~~; Jiya	Jiya	Manisha	Pooja		No Captain	Abhishek		No Captain
Captain's Nominations	No Captain			Aaliya	Not eligible	Bebika; Falaq	Pooja (to evict)	Not eligible	Not eligible	Falaq	Abhishek (to save)	No Captain	39:55 Min	Not eligible	No Captain
Vote to:	Eject Puneet	None	Evict		None	Evict			Evict / Save	Evict			27 Min	WIN	
Elvish	Not In House								Avinash (to evict)	Falaq	Avinash; Bebika	Jiya	38:41 Min	No; Nominations	Winner (Day 59)
Abhishek	No	No; Nominations	Avinash	Bebika; Cyrus	Nominated	~~House~~; ~~Captain~~		Safe	Falaq (to evict)	Falaq	Bebika	Jad	House; Captain	No; Nominations	1st runner-up (Day 59)
Manisha	No	No; Nominations	Jiya; Palak	Jiya	No; Nominations	Falaq; Jiya		Not eligible	House; Captain	Falaq	Avinash; Jiya	Jad	38:41 Min	No; Nominations	2nd runner-up (Day 59)
Bebika	Yes	No; Nominations	Akanksha; Falaq; Jiya	Aaliya; Abhishek; Akanksha; Jiya	No; Nominations	Jiya; Manisha		Not eligible	Pooja (to save)	Falaq	Aashika; Elvish; Manisha	Jiya	30:24 Min	No; Nominations	3rd runner-up (Day 59)
Pooja	Yes	No; Nominations	Palak	Aaliya	No; Nominations	Cyrus; Manisha		Falaq	Bebika (to save)	House; Captain		Manisha	30:24 Min	No; Nominations	4th runner-up (Day 59)
Jiya	Yes	No; Nominations	Bebika	Avinash; Bebika	Nominated	Avinash; Bebika		House; Captain	Abhishek (to save)	Falaq	Aashika; Manisha	Avinash	39:55 Min	Evicted (Day 54)	
Avinash	Yes	No; Nominations	Abhishek; Bebika; Palak	Aaliya; Jiya	No; Nominations	Cyrus; Manisha		Pooja	Aashika (to evict)	BTM 3	Manisha; Aashika	Manisha	Evicted (Day 50)		
Jad	Yes	No; Nominations	Bebika; Manisha	none	No; Nominations	Bebika; Pooja		Not eligible	Jiya (to evict)	BTM 3	Aashika; Elvish; Manisha	Avinash	Evicted (Day 50)		
Aashika	Not In House								Jad (to evict)	Falaq	Jad	Evicted (Day 43)			
Falaq	Yes	No; Nominations	Bebika	House; Captain		Cyrus; Manisha		Avinash; Bebika; Manisha	Elvish (to evict)	BTM 3	Evicted by Housemates (Day 36)				
Cyrus	Yes	No; Nominations	Palak	Abhishek	No; Nominations	Avinash; Jiya		Walked (Day 23)							
Akanksha	Not In House	No; Nominations	Bebika	Not eligible	Nominated	Evicted (Day 15)									
Aaliya	No	No; Nominations	Bebika	Avinash; Cyrus; Pooja	Evicted (Day 11)										
Palak	Not In House	No; Nominations	Avinash; Bebika	Evicted (Day 8)											
Puneet	Nominated	Ejected by Housemates (Day 1)													
Notes	1,2	3	4	5,6	7	8, 9		10,11	None						
Against public vote	None	Akanksha; Palak	Avinash; Bebika; Jiya; Palak	Aaliya; Jiya	Abhishek; Akanksha; Jiya	Avinash; Bebika; Cyrus; Falaq; Jad; ~~Jiya~~; Manisha; Pooja		Avinash; Bebika; Falaq; Manisha; Pooja	Aashika; Avinash; Elvish; Falaq; Jad; Jiya	Avinash; Falaq; Jad	Aashika; Manisha	Avinash; Jad; Jiya; Manisha	Elvish; Jiya; Manisha	Abhishek; Bebika; Elvish; Manisha; Pooja	
Ejected	Puneet	None													
Walked	None							Cyrus	None						
Evicted	No; Eviction		Palak	Aaliya	Akanksha	No; Eviction			Falaq		Aashika	Avinash	Jiya	Pooja	Bebika
Evicted	No; Eviction		Palak	Aaliya	Akanksha	No; Eviction			Falaq		Aashika	Avinash	Jiya	Manisha	
Evicted	No; Eviction		Palak	Aaliya	Akanksha	No; Eviction			Falaq		Aashika	Jad	Jiya	Abhishek	Elvish

Color keys

indicates the House Captain.
indicates the Nominees for house captaincy.
indicates that the Housemate was safe prior to nominations.
indicates that the Housemate was directly nominated for eviction before the regular nominations process.
indicates the winner.
indicates the first runner-up.
indicates the second runner-up.
indicates the third runner-up.
indicates the fourth runner-up.
indicates that the contestant has re-entered the house.
indicates that the contestant walked out of the show.
indicates that the contestant was ejected from the house.
indicates that the contestant was evicted.

Nomination notes

- ^1: On Launch Day, Akanksha and Palak were not chosen by the panellists to enter the house. They joined the house on Day 2.
- ^2: On Day 1, Puneet was nominated by Bigg Boss for misusing Bigg Boss property and misbehaving with fellow housemates. The housemates voted to evict him from the house.
- ^3: On Day 2, Akanksha and Palak faced the public vote for a few hours. Public votes saved Akanksha, and Palak was given a chance to stay only if she collected 30,000 BB Currency from other housemates. She was successful and remained in the house.
- ^4: In these Nominations, housemates had the option to nominate either one housemate, two housemate, or three housemates with BB Currency prices of 2000, 2500, and 3000, respectively.
- ^5: On Day 8, Akanksha chose to free herself from jail by giving up the chance to nominate in the next nominations.
- ^6: In these Nominations, Bigg Boss presented a housemate, and the housemates had to press the buzzer to nominate that housemate. Housemates had no limit on nominations.
- ^7: Akanksha, Abhishek, and Jiya were nominated by Bigg Boss as a punishment for discussing nominations.
- ^8: Jad was elected by the housemates as the Captain. Abhishek completed a secret task given by Bigg Boss and became the new House Captain.
- ^9: Jad was directly nominated by Salman for breaching the show's rules.
- ^10: Cyrus voluntarily exited the show due to a family emergency.
- ^11: Elvish Yadav and Aashika Bhatia entered the show as wild card entrants on Day 26 and selected Manisha as Captain for Week 5.

== Guest appearances ==
Week(s)	Day(s)	Guest(s)	Notes
Grand Premiere	Day 0	Ajay Jadeja	Janta Ki Awaaz
Grand Premiere	Day 0	Dibang	Janta Ki Awaaz
Grand Premiere	Day 0	Sandiip Sikcand	Janta Ki Awaaz
Grand Premiere	Day 0	Sunny Leone	Janta Ki Awaaz
Grand Premiere	Day 0	MC Stan	Janta Ki Awaaz
Week 1	Day 8	Maniesh Paul	To promote Rafuchakkkar
Week 1	Day 8	Rakul Preet Singh	To promote movie I Love You
Week 1	Day 8	Krushna Abhishek	To entertain and presenting fun task
Week 2	Day 15	Gippy Grewal	To promote Carry on Jatta 3
Week 2	Day 15	Sonam Bajwa	To promote Carry on Jatta 3
Week 2	Day 15	Krushna Abhishek	To entertain
Week 3	Day 21	Shafaq Naaz	To interact with her sister Falaq Naaz
Week 3	Day 21	Kunal Vijaykar	To interact with his friend Cyrus Broacha
Week 3	Day 22	Terence Lewis	To perform a task with contestants
Week 3	Day 22	Krushna Abhishek	To entertain
Week 4	Day 26	Dipraj Jadhav	To perform a special task
Week 4	Day 26	Miss Malini	To perform a special task
Week 4	Day 26	Snehil Mehra	To perform a special task
Week 4	Day 26	RJ Malishka	To perform a special task
Week 4	Day 26	Danny Pandit	To perform a special task
Week 4	Day 27-28	Krushna Abhishek	To host Weekend ka Vaar
Week 4	Day 27-28	Bharti Singh	To host Weekend ka Vaar
Week 4	Day 28	Shriya Pilgaonkar	To promote Ishq-e-Nadaan
Week 4	Day 28	Nishant Bhat	For fun tasks
Week 4	Day 28	Sumedh Mudgalkar	For fun tasks
Week 4	Day 28	Sumbul Touqeer	For fun tasks
Week 5	Day 35	Krushna Abhishek	To entertain
Week 5	Day 35	Mahesh Keshwala	To interact with his friend Abhishek Malhan
Week 6	Day 41	Sushma Yadav	To interact with her son Elvish Yadav
Week 6	Day 42	Bharti Singh	To entertain
Week 6	Day 42	Vijay Varma	To promote Kaalkoot
Week 6	Day 42	Shweta Tripathi	To promote Kaalkoot
Week 6	Day 42	Emiway Bantai	To promote his song Kudi
Week 7	Day 43	Cattleya Hadid	Jad Hadid's daughter
Week 7	Day 43	Pooja Sachdev	Avinash Sachdev's mother
Week 7	Day 43	Manoj Kumar Chandi	Manisha Rani's father
Week 7	Day 43	Dimple Malhan	Abhishek Malhan's mother
Week 7	Day 44	Surekha Gavli	Jiya Shankar's mother
Week 7	Day 44	Mahesh Bhatt	Pooja Bhatt's father
Week 7	Day 44	Ram Avtar Yadav	Elvish Yadav's father
Week 7	Day 44	Janardhan Dhurve	Bebika Dhurve's father
Week 7	Day 49	Raftaar	To promote Bajao
Week 7	Day 49	Mahira Sharma	To promote Bajao
Week 7	Day 49	Sahil Khattar	To promote Bajao
Week 7	Day 49	Sahil Vaid	To promote Bajao
Week 7	Day 49	Tanuj Virwani	To promote Bajao
Week 7	Day 49	Neha Kakkar	To perform a fun task and present some awards
Week 8	Day 51	Uorfi Javed	To encourage housemates
Week 8	Day 52	Kunal Vijaykar	For fun food task
Week 8	Day 52	Devashree Sanghvi	For fun food task
Week 8	Day 52	Saloni Kukreja	For fun food task
Week 8	Day 53	Anunay Sood	For travel vlogs task
Week 8	Day 53	Mohit Manocha	For travel vlogs task
Week 8	Day 54	RJ Mahvash Amu	For Radio BB
Week 8	Day 55	Amit Tandon	For a fun roasting task
Week 8	Day 56	Tony Kakkar	For live concert
Week 8	Day 56	Asees Kaur	For live concert
Week 8	Day 57	Badshah	To promote upcoming song
Week 8	Day 57	Jimmy Sheirgill	To promote Ranneeti: Balakot & Beyond
Week 8	Day 57	Elnaaz Norouzi	To promote Ranneeti: Balakot & Beyond
Week 8	Day 57	Prasanna Venkatesan	To promote Ranneeti: Balakot & Beyond
Week 8	Day 57	Ayushmann Khurrana	To promote Dream Girl 2
Week 8	Day 57	Ananya Panday	To promote Dream Girl 2
