= Bhaangarh =

- Film poster
- Directed by: Dilip Sood
- Written by: Dilip Sood
- Screenplay by: Dilip Sood; Harosh Vyas; Taqi Imam; Shivani Thakur
- Produced by: Dilip Sood; Mayank Jain; Ajay Rai
- Starring: Adeel Chaudhry; Debonita Sur; Suzanna Mukherjee; Tom Alter
- Cinematography: Suhas Rao
- Edited by: Charu Shree Roy
- Music by: Adeel Chaudhry; Aniket Kar
- Release date: 5 September 2014 (India)
- Country: India
- Language: Hindi

Bhaangarh is a 2014 Indian horror film directed by Dilip Sood and co-produced by Mayank Jain and Ajay Rai. The film is based on Bhangarh Fort, Rajasthan which is known as the most haunted place in Asia.

== Plot outline ==
A group of six friends visit Bhangarh Fort. While visiting the Fort, they accidentally enter and get trapped in the strictly prohibited and haunted area of the Fort.

== Cast ==
- Adeel Chaudhry as Shakti
- Suzanna Mukherjee as Rahi
- Tom Alter
- Puneet as Deepak
- Aneet Kaur Sekhon as Jaz
- Debonita Sur as Pia
- Herry Tangiri as Goldie

== Production and release ==
Film was directed and written by Dilip Sood. In an interview he said, "Since childhood I have been a huge horror fan with a special interest in slasher and psychological horror films. Through Bhaangarh, I have tried to deviate from the traditional Indian horror film and give audiences a new experience which draws from both these subgenres. The film will surely take audience by surprise, keeping them guessing and scaring them at the same time. The movie deals with human emotion and how, when your worst nightmare comes true, it becomes impossible to tell between a friend from a foe. We have tried to capture this essence and communicate it to audience through the movie's trailer and poster."

The film was Bollywood debut of Adeel Chaudhry. The trailer of the film was released on 7 June 2014 and the film was released on 5 September 2014 in India.

=== Soundtrack ===
The soundtrack of Bhaangarh was directed by Adeel Chaudhry and Aniket Kar.

== See also ==
- Trip To Bhangarh, another 2014 film based on the fort
- List of Bollywood films of 2014
