= Trip to Bhangarh =

- Theatrical release poster
- Directed by: Jitendra Pawar
- Written by: Jitendra Pawar
- Produced by: Vikas Rastogi
- Starring: Manish Chaudhary; Suzanna Mukherjee; Piyush Raina; Rachit Behl; Rohit Chaudhury; Vikram Kochhar; Parree Pande
- Cinematography: Mohammad N Khan Parteek Pawar
- Edited by: Atul Chauhan
- Music by: Onkar Singh
- Production companies: Rock N Rolla Films; Swami Samartha Creations
- Release date: 28 August 2014
- Running time: 113 minutes
- Country: India
- Language: Hindi

Trip to Bhangarh: Asia's Most Haunted Place is a 2014 Bollywood horror-thriller film starring Manish Choudhary and Suzanna Mukherjee in the lead roles. It is directed by Jitendra Pawar and produced by Rock N Rolla Films. The music is directed by Onkar Singh. The story is based on urban legends about the Bhangarh Fort in Bhangarh, Rajasthan, a reportedly haunted location dubbed "Asia's most haunted place", and is also influenced by Final Destination (2000).

== Plot ==
In a college reunion party, five friends plan to visit a haunted place called Bhangarh and spend some time together. Unaware about the dangers lurking at this place, they come across a unique history and a number of unknown things about the place. After they come back from the trip, unusual events start taking place with the five friends. They are confused about the motive behind the occurrence of those events. They relate the occurrences with the trip to Bhangarh. They assume that the trip has caused all negative impacts on their lives. Will they be able to find the truth of the events? Is someone else behind everything that is happening in the lives of the five friends?

== Cast ==
- Manish Chaudhari
- Suzanna Mukherjee as Kavya
- Piyush Raina as Golu
- Rachit Behl as Jadu
- Rohit Chaudhury as Ashu
- Vikram Kochhar as Cheeru
- Parree Pande as Prachi
- Vidushi Mehra as Priestess
- salim zaidi as mehnat singh hola
- Sudhir Rikhari as Mangu

== See also ==
- Bhaangarh, another 2014 film based on the haunted location
