= Akanksha Puri =

Indian actress and model (born 1988)

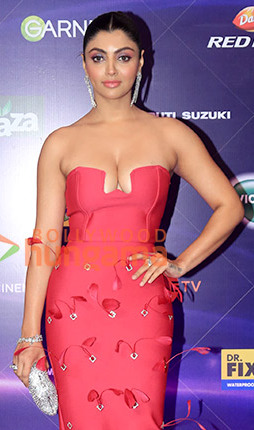
- Puri at the 2025 Zee Cine Awards
- Born: 26 August 1988 (age 38); Indore, Madhya Pradesh, India
- Occupations: Actress; model; dancer
- Years active: 2013–present

Akanksha Puri (born 26 July 1988) is an Indian actress and model, who prominently works in Hindi, Tamil, Malayalam and Kannada films. Along with few television shows. She is best known for her role as Goddess Parvati in Vighnaharta Ganesh. Puri was a contestant on the reality TV show Bigg Boss OTT Hindi - Season 2 and entered the show in June 2023 with 12 other contestants

== Career ==
Puri took up modelling projects during her short stint as an international cabin crew member in Kingfisher Airlines, when she even got a role in one of Vasan Eye Care 2011 advertisements. She was then spotted by Studio Green who bagged her for a role in the 2013 Tamil action comedy Alex Pandian through which she made her first film debut.

She later made her Hindi film debut with Madhur Bhandarkar's 2015 drama film Calendar Girls. In 2017, she was cast as Mata AdiParashakti in Vighnaharta Ganesh TV series.

She is the winner of the show Swayamvar – Mika Di Vohti.

== Controversies ==
In 2023, Akanksha participated in Bigg Boss OTT (Hindi season 2) where she kissed Jad Hadid while Hadid side-groped one of her breasts, which caused a controversy.

== Filmography ==
=== Films ===
Year	Title	Role	Language	Notes	Ref.
2013	Alex Pandian	Kaalyan's middle sister	Tamil		
2014	Praise the Lord	Annie	Malayalam		
2015	Lodde	Akanksha	Kannada		
2015	Samrajyam II: Son of Alexander	Saira IPS	Malayalam		
2015	Calendar Girls	Nandita Menon	Hindi		
2015	Amar Akbar Anthony	Gouri	Malayalam	Cameo	
2019	Action	Kaira	Tamil		
2024	Rajaram		Bhojpuri		
2025	So Long Valley	Riya	Hindi		
2025	Rishtey		Bhojpuri		

=== Web series ===
Year	Title	Role	Language	Notes	Ref.
2023	Inspector Avinash	Meetu Punjaban	Hindi		
2023	Honey Trap Squad	Riya Roy	Hindi		
2024	Dons & Darlings	Naaz	Hindi		

=== Television ===
Year	Title	Role	Notes	Ref.
2015	CID	Herself	Guest	
2017–2020	Vighnaharta Ganesh	Parvati	Lead Role	
2019	Bigg Boss 13	Herself	Guest	
2022	Bigg Boss 15	Herself	Challenger	
2022	Swayamavar - Mika Di Vohti	Contestant	Winner	
2023	Bigg Boss OTT 2	Contestant	12th place	

=== Music videos ===
Year	Title	Singer(s)	Ref(s)
2017	Jahaan Tum Ho	Shrey Singhal	
2019	Dancing Doll	Jyotica Tangri	
2019	Chitthi	Jubin Nautiyal	
2020	Main Balak Tu Mata	Jubin Nautiyal	
2021	Main Jis Din Bhula Doon	Jubin Nautiyal, Tulsi Kumar	
2021	Hare Krishna Hare	Palak Muchhal	
2021	Dangerous	Shrey Singhal	
2021	Bewafa Tera Muskurana	Jubin Nautiyal	
2021	Mere Warga	Kaka Ji	
2022	Jaa Rahe Ho	Yasser Desai	
2022	Ishq Hi Hai	Saman	
2023	Don't You Know	Amrit Maan	
2023	Dua Karo	Ninja	
2023	Video Viral Hogaya	Akasa Singh	
2023	Baarishon	Udit Narayan, Payal Dev	
2024	Latak Jaiba	Khesari Lal Yadav, Shilpi Raj	
