= So Long Valley =

Indian Crime Thriller film

- Theatrical release poster
- Directed by: Man Singh
- Written by: Man Singh
- Produced by: Man Singh; Mohsin Khan (Creative Producer)
- Starring: Tridha Choudhury; Akanksha Puri; Vikram Kochhar; Man Singh; Alisha Parveen
- Cinematography: Srikant Pattnaik
- Edited by: Afzal Shaikh
- Music by: LK Laxmikaant
- Production company: Sourya Studios
- Release date: 25 July 2025
- Running time: 124 minutes
- Country: India
- Language: Hindi

So Long Valley is a 2025 Indian Hindi-language crime thriller film starring Tridha Choudhury and Vikram Kochhar.

== Plot ==
The story follows Inspector Suman Negi (Tridha Choudhary) and Inspector Dev (Man Singh) as they investigate a chilling kidnapping case in Manali. A young woman appears at a local police station after her sister mysteriously vanishes enroute from Shimla. What initially appears to be a straightforward abduction slowly reveals darker secrets, questioning who the real victim is.

== Cast ==
- Tridha Choudhury as Inspector Suman Negi
- Akanksha Puri as Riya
- Vikram Kochhar as Kuldeep, a taxi driver
- Man Singh as Inspector Dev
- Alisha Parveen Khan as Moushmi
- Neha Duboliya as constable Gayathri Rana

== Production ==
Produced by Sourya Studios, the film is directed by Man Singh, who also penned the story and dialogues. Produced by Man Singh with Mohsin Khan as creative producer and Dev Singh as executive producer, Associate Producer APEX Bioscope, the film features additional screenplay by Pankaj Uniyal. Cinematography is by Srikant Pattnaik, editing by Afzal Shaikh, and music and lyrics by LK Laxmikant. Costumes are designed by Pankaj Choudhary. The film is scheduled to release in theaters on 25 July 2025, distributed by August Entertainment with multiplex partner Cinepolis Cinemas India, shot across Manali and Pratapgarh.
