= Vikram Kochhar =

Indian Hindi actor (born 1983)

- Born: Vikram Singh; 27 September 1983 (age 42); Gurgaon, Haryana, India
- Occupation: Actor
- Years active: 2013 – present

Vikram Kochhar is an Indian actor known for his roles in Indian television and Hindi cinema. Kochhar graduated with arts degree from National School of Drama in 2009. Kochhar is known for his roles in Matru Ki Bijlee Ka Mandola (2013), Ghanchakkar (2013), Trip to Bhangarh (2014), Angry Indian Goddesses (2015), Manikarnika: The Queen of Jhansi (2019), Kesari (2019), Thank God (2022), Mili (2022), Non Stop Dhamaal (2023), Dunki (2023), Boong (2024), and So Long Valley (2025). He is currently married to Kuhu Malla, a cinematographer.

== Early life ==
Kochhar was born on 27 September 1983, in Gurgaon, Haryana, India, and completed his schooling from Army School Noida.

== Filmography ==
=== Film ===
Year	Title	Role	Language	Ref.
2013	Matru Ki Bijlee Ka Mandola		Hindi	
2013	Ghanchakkar		Hindi	
2014	Pied Piper	I. M. Sarkar	English	
2014	Trip to Bhangarh		Hindi	
2015	Angry Indian Goddesses	Mr. Gill	Hindi	
2016	Love Shagun	Deepak	Hindi	
2016	Hai Apna Dil To Awara	Rikki Dalwani	Hindi	
2017	Kuldip Patwal: I Didn't Do It!	Goenka	Hindi	
2018	Husband Material	Servant	Hindi	
2018	Game Paisa Ladki		Hindi	
2019	Manikarnika: The Queen of Jhansi		Hindi	
2019	Raid	ACP Shamsher	Hindi	
2019	22 Yards	Anindo	Hindi	
2019	Kesari	Gilab Singh	Hindi	
2021	Bawri Chori		Hindi	
2021	Wrong Leela	Chandan Chugh	Hindi	
2021	No Land's Man	Farookh	Hindi	
2022	Janhit Mein Jaari	Vijay	Hindi	
2022	Rashtra Kavach Om	Rajat	Hindi	
2022	Modi Ji Ki Beti	Tauseef	Hindi	
2022	Thank God	Inspector Thambe	Hindi	
2022	Mother Teresa & Me	Dr. Ahmed	English	
2022	Mili	Sudheer Malkoti	Hindi	
2023	Non Stop Dhamaal	Shareef	Hindi	
2023	Dvand: The Internal Conflict		Hindi	
2023	Dunki	Balindar "Buggu" Lakhanpal	Hindi	
2024	Kahan Shuru Kahan Khatam		Hindi	
2024	Boong	Sudhir Agarwal	Manipuri	
2025	The Networker	Aditya	Hindi	
2025	So Long Valley	Kuldeep	Hindi	
2025	Aankhon Ki Gustaakhiyan	Prashant	Hindi	

=== Television ===
Year	Title	Role	Language
2015	Sumit Smabhal Lega	Rajneesh Walia	Hindi
2016	Crime Patrol		Hindi
2017	Pagla Ghoda	Shashi	Hindi
2019	Parchhayee: Ghost Stories by Ruskin Bond	Shekhar	Hindi
2019	Hawa Badle Hassu	Laurence Bishnoi	Hindi
2019	Sacred Games	Mathu	Hindi
2019	I Fell In Love With A Sanki	Heera Nandani	Hindi
2019	Bhram	Avtar	Hindi
2019	Little Things	Friend	Hindi
2019	Gudiya Ki Shaadi	Friend	Hindi
2019	Inside Edge	Lambodar	Hindi
2019	The Will		Hindi
2019	Khade Hai Teri Raahon Mein		Hindi
2020 - present	Raktanchal	Sanki Pandey	Hindi
2020 - present	Aashram	Sadhu	Hindi
2020 - present	A Simple Murder	S. I. Pratik Mishra	Hindi
2021	The Legend of Hanuman	Suketu	Hindi
2022	Prayag		Hindi
2022	Dr. Donn		Hindi
2022	Choona	Contractor JP	Hindi
2022	Modern Love Mumbai		Hindi
2023	Couple Goals		Hindi
2023	Rafuchakkar	Ashfaq	Hindi
2023	A Knowing		Hindi
2023	02	Short	Hindi
2026	Bandwaale	Rafi	Hindi
2026	Hello Bachhon	Prateek Maheshwari	Hindi
