= Bhangarh =

Village in Rajasthan, India

- Village
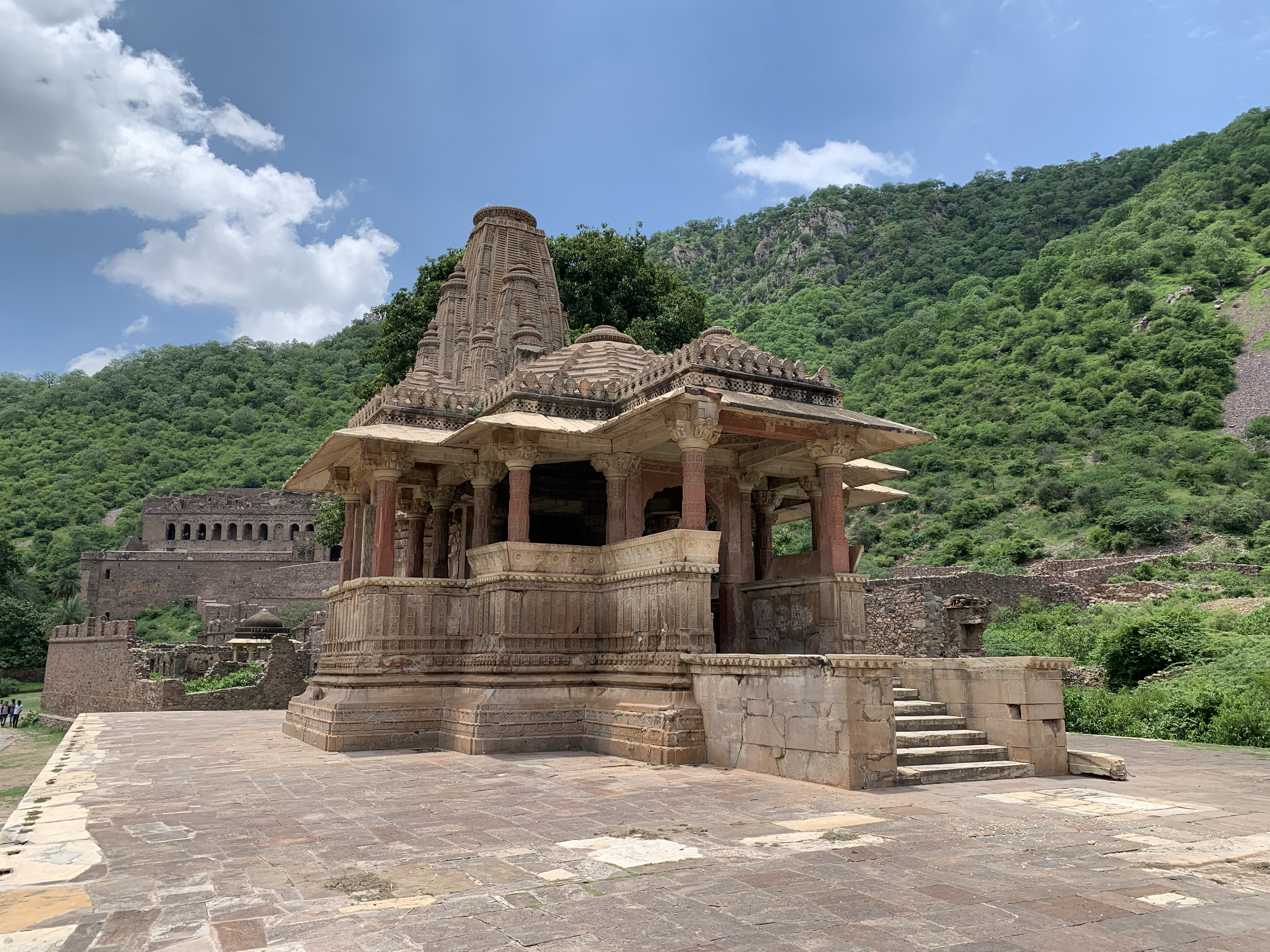
- Gopinath Temple in the Bhangarh Fort complex
- Nickname: Bhootiya garh
- Location in Rajasthan, India Bhangarh (India)
- Coordinates: 27.094701°N 76.290604°E
- Country: India
- State: Rajasthan
- District: Alwar
- Established: 1456
- Founded by: Jaisingh
- Elevation: 382 m (1,253 ft)

Population (2001)
  - Total: 1,250

Languages
  - Official: Hindi
- Time zone: UTC+5:30 (IST)
- Vehicle registration: N/A
- Nearest city: Alwar
- Sex ratio: 677 / 629 ♂/♀
- Lok Sabha constituency: Dausa
- Vidhan Sabha constituency: Thanagaji
- Climate: Tropical (Köppen)

Bhangarh is a village situated in Rajgarh Alwar, Rajasthan state of India. It is situated in the Rajgarh municipality of the Alwar district in Rajasthan. Bhangarh is at the edge of the Sariska Tiger Reserve.

Bhangarh is also a pre-historic site and tourist spot. The journey to Bhangarh takes approximately 1.5 hrs and is 65 km from Jaipur. Its old buildings include the Hindu temples of Gopinath, Shiv (Someshwar), Hanuman, Ganesh, Vishal Devta, Lavina Devi, and Keshav Rai. Other buildings include shops and dhabas along the main road, several havelis, a mosque, and a palace. The palace is protected by two inner fortifications across the valley. The town is separated from the plain by ramparts with five gates.

The town was established in 1573 (VS 1631) during the rule of Kachwaha Rajput ruler of Jaipur Bhagwant Das as the residence of his second son, Madho Singh, the younger brother of Emperor Akbar's general, Man Singh I. Madho Singh participated in many campaigns with his father and brother. The next ruler of Bhangarh was his son Chhatra Singh, after whose death in 1630, Bhangarh slowly declined. When the Mughal Empire became weaker after the death of Aurangzeb, Jai Singh II annexed Bhangarh to his state by force in 1720. After this, Bhangarh diminished in population, and since the famine of 1783 (VS 1840), the town has remained uninhabited.

Trespassing near Bhangarh is legally prohibited between sunset and sunrise, as it is said to be haunted. According to locals, spirits enter the place after sunset and thus nobody is allowed to enter the borders of Bhangarh during this time. A signboard posted by the ASI (Archaeological Survey of India), which is a Government of India organization, specifies these instructions. While the board is written in Hindi, the instructions on it roughly translate to: "Entering the borders of Bhangarh before sunrise and after sunset is strictly prohibited. Legal action will be taken against anybody who does not follow these instructions". Some other rules are there, according to which no one is allowed to graze their animals in the village after sunset.

== See also ==
- Bhangarh Fort
