= Hello Bachhon =

2026 Indian television series

- Genre: Biographical drama
- Created by: Abhishek Yadav
- Written by: Abhishek Yadav; Vernaali; Ankit Yadav; Sandeep Singh Rawat
- Directed by: Pratish Mehta
- Starring: Viineet Kumar Singh; Vikram Kochhar; Girija Oak
- Music by: Anand Bajpai
- Country of origin: India
- Original language: Hindi
- No. of seasons: 1
- No. of episodes: 5

Production
- Executive producers: Vijay Koshy; Shreyansh Pandey
- Cinematography: Amogh Deshpande
- Editor: Akash Bundhoo
- Camera setup: Multi-camera
- Running time: 32–45 minutes
- Production company: The Viral Fever

Original release
- Network: Netflix
- Release: March 6, 2026

Hello Bachhon is a 2026 Indian Hindi-language biographical drama series created by The Viral Fever (TVF) for Netflix. Directed by Pratish Mehta, the series stars Viineet Kumar Singh. The narrative tracks Pandey's journey from a struggling teacher in Prayagraj to building a digital education empire.

== Premise ==
The series follows the life of Alakh Pandey, a charismatic physics teacher who rejects traditional coaching institute models to provide affordable education through YouTube. It explores his early financial struggles, his unique teaching style aimed at "backbenchers," and the eventual scaling of Physics Wallah into a major ed-tech platform.

== Cast and characters ==
- Viineet Kumar Singh as Alakh Pandey
- Vikram Kochhar as Prateek Maheshwari
- Girija Oak as Alakh's Sister
- Anumeha Jain as Shivangi
- Chitransh Raj as Sanyam
- Pankaj Kashyap as Krishna Sir
- Mudit Dwivedi as Alankrit
- Prashant Sethi as Abhishek
- Satendra Soni as Bhola

== Reception ==
Viineet Kumar Singh's performance was a highlight for most critics.

=== Critical response ===
Writing for The Times of India, Archika Khurana rated the series 3 out of 5 stars, noting that while the show captures the "emotional core" of Pandey's struggle, it occasionally feels like a "glorified success story." ABPLive compared the show to Kota Factory, noting that Singh shines even when the script feels familiar.

However, the writing and pacing faced criticism for being predictable. The Indian Express remarked that while Singh "lifts the series," the storytelling remains largely formulaic. The Hindu provided a lukewarm review, suggesting that Singh's performance "gets diffused in TVF's factory-made snoozefest," citing a sense of fatigue with the "underdog teacher" trope. Cinema Express echoed this, calling it a "generic success story" that expects the audience to do the emotional "homework" the script neglects.

The intent of the show was a major point of contention. India Today and Scroll.in both characterized the series as a "glorified ad campaign" or a "brand-building exercise" for Physics Wallah rather than a nuanced biography. The Hollywood Reporter India criticized the lack of objectivity, suggesting the series avoids the darker complexities of the edtech boom.

Conversely, some critics found the emotional core effective. Moneycontrol described it as a "simple and moving story" that successfully captures the rise of an underdog. Firstpost argued that the drama is "much more than just a plug" for the company, praising the depiction of the teacher-student bond.
