= Suzanna Mukherjee =

Indian actress

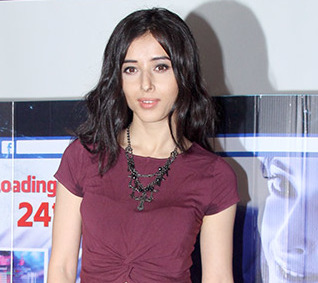
- Mukherjee at a promotional event
- Born: India
- Occupation: Actress
- Years active: 2001–2023

Suzanna Mukherjee is an Indian actress.

== Personal life ==
Mukherjee is a half Bengali and half Ukrainian film and television actress. Her father, Subrata Mukherjee, is Bengali from Bhilai, Chhattisgarh, whereas her mother, Lyudmila Mukherjee, is half Russian and half Ukrainian. She was born in India and completed her schooling in Bhilai where her mother runs a boutique. She considers Amitabh Bachchan, Priyanka Chopra, Tabu as her favorite actor and actress from Bollywood, She did her MBA in Finance from Pune. Being born in a multi cultural family she knows several languages including Ukrainian, Russian, Bengali, Hindi, English, Marathi.

== Career ==
=== Television ===
She was one of the contestants in MTV Roadies Hell Down Under, which was the sixth edition of the reality show but she was eliminated in the 6th episode. Apart from Roadies she has also taken part in another reality show Emotional Atyachar.

=== Film ===
In the film she is set to star opposite Bollywood actor Emraan Hashmi in Raaz Reboot also called Raaz 4, the 4th installment of the horror franchise.

=== Web series ===
On 21 December 2016, she started working on a new web series Married Woman Diaries on Sony LIV and YouTube.

== Filmography ==
=== Television ===
- 2009 - MTV Roadies Hell Down Under, a reality show on MTV as herself
- 2009 - Basera on NDTV Imagine as Ujjwala Parikh
- 2009-10 - Roomies on Channel V as Mira

=== Films ===
- 2012 - Tutiya Dil as Rhea
- 2014 - Trip to Bhangarh as Kavya
- 2014 - 22 Yards as Shonali
- 2015 - Badmashiyaan as Nari
- 2016 - Raaz Reboot as Shreya
- 2017 - Mona Darling as Mona

=== Web series ===
- 2017 - Married Woman Diaries
- 2023 - Kaalkoot as Shivani
