= Lodde =

- Directed by: S. V. Suresh Raj
- Written by: Rajesh Nataranga (dialogues)
- Screenplay by: Shrinath
- Story by: Shrinath
- Produced by: Manjunath
- Starring: Komal Kumar; Akanksha Puri; Shayaji Shinde
- Cinematography: Bhuvan Gowda
- Music by: Chinni Charan a.k.a. Charan Banzo
- Release date: 31 July 2015
- Country: India
- Language: Kannada

Lodde is a 2015 Indian Kannada-language romantic comedy film directed by S. V. Suresh Raj and written by Shrinath. It stars Komal Kumar and Akanksha Puri. The film is produced by Manjunath. The music is composed by Charan Banzo, who had worked in Telugu films under the name Chinni Charan. The film marks the Kannada debut for the lead actress Akanksha Puri. The principal photography of the film began in 2013 and took a long period to complete.

== Cast ==
- Komal Kumar
- Akanksha Puri as Akanksha
- Shayaji Shinde
- Avinash
- Gopinath Bhat
- Rohith Nagesh
- Naveen Krishna
- Heena Panchal in item number
- Vanishree

== Soundtrack ==
The soundtrack is composed and written by Charan Banzo, a debutant. Anand Audio has bought the audio rights of the film. A special song dedicated to veteran actor Vishnuvardhan was recorded in the voice of S. P. Balasubrahmanyam and written by Hrudaya Shiva.

=== Track listing ===
No.	Title	Lyrics	Singer(s)	Length
1.	"Bannada Hoovina"	Jayant Kaikini	Shreya Ghoshal
2.	"Gandhijinu Left Hand"	K. Kalyan	Vijay Prakash
3.	"Lodde Dance"	Hrudaya Shiva	Baba Sehgal
4.	"Lodde Dance"	Hrudaya Shiva	S. P. Balasubrahmanyam
5.	"Senorita"		Kunal Ganjawala, Deepthi Sathi

== Release ==
Initially, the film was planned to release on 31 July 2014. However, due to the lack of theaters, the filmmakers' adherence to a particular main theater has pushed the release to an unspecified date. Finally, the film was released on 31 July 2015.

== Reception ==
=== Critical response ===
A critic from Deccan Chronicle wrote, "The calendar girl Akanksha Puri looks beautiful but immature script and the making are the culprits here. For a true fan of Sahasa Simha Vishnu Sir, the best way to watch Lodde is to stay awake in the beginning and after the climax for the Lodde song". Sunanya Suresh from The Times of India wrote, "Watch this film only if you are a Komal fan. The Vishnuvardhan fans could rather revisit an old DVD and enjoy the thrills". Shyam Prasad S from Bangalore Mirror says, "Komal has given the film his best, but this is still a story that Jaggesh did 20 years ago. Newcomer Akanksha has enough charm and acting abilities. Lodde could be your last resort".
