= Kaalkoot =

- Official poster
- Genre: Crime; Drama
- Written by: Arunabh Kumar; Sumit Saxena
- Directed by: Sumit Saxena
- Starring: Vijay Varma; Shweta Tripathi; Seema Biswas; Yashpal Sharma; Gopal Dutt; Suzanna Mukherjee
- Country of origin: India
- Original language: Hindi
- No. of seasons: 1
- No. of episodes: 8

Production
- Producers: Ajit Andhare; Amritpal Singh Bindra; Anand Tiwari
- Production companies: Tipping Point Films; Leo Media Collective; Jio Studios; Viacom18 Studios

Original release
- Network: JioCinema
- Release: 27 July 2023

Kaalkoot is a 2023 Hindi-language crime drama TV series on JioCinema written by Arunabh Kumar and Sumit Saxena and directed by Sumit Saxena. It stars Vijay Varma, Shweta Tripathi, Seema Biswas, Yashpal Sharma, Gopal Dutt, and Suzanna Mukherjee.

== Plot summary ==
The scene opens with a man riding a scooter and throwing acid at a girl. Meanwhile, Ravi Shankar Tripathi a sub-inspector in Uttar Pradesh police is unsatisfied with his post and police work. He is planning to resign from the post by giving his resignation letter to the Station house officer via Constable Sattu Yadav.

In the meanwhile, acid attack case is registered and Ravi is assigned to it. Ravi is not very serious about solving the case as this case was forcefully given by SHO. Parul and Ravi's photo is being exchanged for marriage.

The story revolves around finding the culprit behind the acid attack. The success ratio of finding it is very low only 2 people are arrested out of 28 cases in the past in acid attacks.

== Cast ==
- Vijay Varma as SI Ravi Shankar Tripathi
- Shweta Tripathi as Parul Chaturvedi
- Seema Biswas as Ravi's mother
- Yashpal Shama as Constable Sattu Yadav
- Gopal Dutt as SHO Jagdish Sahay
- Suzanna Mukherjee as Shivani
- Tigmanshu Dhulia as Mani Shankar Tripathi, Ravi's late father, a Professor and Poet

== Release ==
Kaalkoot was released on JioCinema on 27 July 2023.

== Reception ==
Saibal Chatterjee of NDTV rated 2.5 stars and wrote "Kaalkoot, comes close on the heels of two investigative thrillers (Amazon Prime Video's Dahaad and Netflix's Kohrra) that have raised the bar for the genre, a comparative assessment is inevitable, if odious."

Shubhra Gupta of The Indian Express wrote "“Kaalkoot’ would have been much better if it were tighter: the writing makes the scanty material stretch too much, and you find yourself getting impatient at the long loops."

Archika Khurana from The Times of India rated 3.5 stars stating "‘Kaalkoot’ is a thought-provoking and sympathetic series that doesn’t shy away from uncomfortable truths."

A critic from Rediff.com stated "Like any other good show, the nuanced storytelling in Kaalkoot offers more than just surface-level entertainment as it compels you to ponder on harsh realities of our society."
