= Swayamvar – Mika Di Vohti =

Indian reality show

- Genre: Reality
- Inspired by: Swayamvar
- Presented by: Shaan
- Starring: Mika Singh
- Theme music composer: Mika Singh
- Opening theme: Mika Di Vohti
- Country of origin: India
- Original language: Hindi
- No. of seasons: 1
- No. of episodes: 27

Production
- Camera setup: Multi-camera
- Running time: 44 min
- Production company: Sol Production

Original release
- Network: Star Bharat
- Release: 19 June – 25 July 2022

Swayamvar – Mika Di Vohti is an Indian reality show broadcast on Star Bharat Hosted by Shaan. The show premiered on 19 June 2022. It features Mika Singh, who tries to find a suitable life partner for himself from among the 12 contestants. Akanksha Puri was declared the winner.

== Contestants ==
Contestant	Hometown	Status
Akanksha Puri	Bhopal, Madhya Pradesh	Winner; Episode 27
Neet Mahal	Chandigarh	Runners-up; Episode 27
Prantika Das	Kolkata, West Bengal	Runners-up; Episode 27
Riya Kishanchandani	Mumbai, Maharashtra	Eliminated; Episode 24
Chandrani Das	Kolkata, West Bengal	Eliminated; Episode 20
Manpreet Kaur	Punjab	Eliminated; Episode 20
Bushra Sheikh	Mumbai, Maharashtra	Eliminated; Episode 18
Dhwani Pawar	Mumbai, Maharashtra	Eliminated; Episode 18
Sonal Khilwani	Varanasi, Uttar Pradesh	Eliminated; Episode 12
Divya Rai	Buxar, Bihar	Eliminated; Episode 7
Ashlesha Rahule	Nagpur, Maharashtra	Eliminated; Episode 7
Poonam Sood	Ludhiana, Punjab	Eliminated; Episode 3
Pratiksha Das	Mumbai, Maharashtra	Eliminated; Episode 3
Reshma Gulani	Indore, Madhya Pradesh	Eliminated; Episode 3
Nisha Dubey	Varanasi, Uttar Pradesh	Eliminated; Episode 3

Bangle (Pyar Ka Nazrana) Winners

Day	Winner
Day 1	Bushra Sheikh
Day 2	Prantika Das
Day 4	Ashlesha Raule
Day 7	Prantika Das
Day 10	Riya Kishanchandani
Day 15	Neet Mahal

== Series overview ==
Weeks	Week 1								Week 2						Week 3						Week 4			Week 5	Week 6	
Weeks	Week 1								Week 2						Week 3						Week 4			Week 5	Finale	
Day	Day 1	Day 2	Day 3		Day 4			Day 5	Day 7	Day 8		Day 9	Day 10	Day 11	Day 12	Day 13		Day 15		Day 16	Day 17	Day 19	Day 20	Day 24	Day 27	
Mika's Date	No Date	Bushra & Prantika	Chandrani, Sonal & Dhvani		Neet, Prantika & Divya			Ashlesha	Neet	Neet, Riya, Manpreet & Prantika	Neet, Chandrani & Prantika	Neet	Riya, Dhvani & Manpreet	Riya, Dhvani, Manpreet & Chandrani	Neet & Manpreet	Neet, Prantika & Manpreet		Neet		No Date	Akanksha	No Date				
	Bangle		Speed Dating		Love By Chance			Bangle	Video Screening	Game	Bangle	Date	Bangle	Kabaddi	Date	Game	Date	Cooking Challenge	Bangle	Ramp Walk	Photo Session	Dance Competition	Top 4	Top 3	WIN	
Akanksha	WILD CARD																				Won	Lost	Top 4	Top 3	WINNER	
Neet	Didn't get Bangle		Lost		Lost	N/A	Won	Didn't get Bangle	Won	Won	Didn't get Bangle	Won	Didn't get Bangle	Lost	Lost	Lost	Won	Won	Got Bangle	Lost	Lost	Lost	Top 4	Top 3	Eliminated; Top 3	
Prantika	Didn't get Bangle	Got Bangle	Lost		Won	N/A	Lost	Didn't get Bangle	Lost	Won	Got Bangle	Lost	Didn't get Bangle	Lost	Lost	Lost	Won	Lost	Didn't get Bangle	Won	Lost	Lost	Top 4	Top 3	Eliminated; Top 3	
Riya	WILD CARD									Won	Didn't get Bangle	Lost	Got Bangle	Won	Lost	Lost	Lost	Lost	Didn't get Bangle	Lost	Lost	Won	Top 4	Eliminated; Top 4 (Day 24)		
Manpreet	WILD CARD									Won	Didn't get Bangle	Lost	Didn't get Bangle	Team Captain;Won	Won	Won	Won	Lost	Didn't get Bangle	Lost	Lost	Lost	Eliminated (Day 20)			
Chandrani	Didn't get Bangle		Won		Lost	N/A	Lost	Didn't get Bangle	Lost	Lost	Didn't get Bangle	Won	Didn't get Bangle	Won	Lost	Lost	Lost	Lost	Didn't get Bangle	Lost	Lost	Lost	Eliminated (Day 20)			
Bushra	Got Bangle	Didn't get Bangle	Lost		Lost	N/A	Lost	Didn't get Bangle	Lost	Lost	Didn't get Bangle	Lost	Didn't get Bangle	Team Captain; Lost	Lost	Lost	Lost	Disqualified	Didn't get Bangle	Lost	Lost	Eliminated (Day 18)				
Dhvani	Didn't get Bangle		Won		Lost	N/A	Lost	Didn't get Bangle	Lost	Lost	Didn't get Bangle	Lost	Didn't get Bangle	Won	Lost	Lost	Lost	Lost	Didn't get Bangle	Lost	Lost	Eliminated (Day 18)				
Sonal	Didn't get Bangle		Won		Lost	N/A	Lost	Didn't get Bangle	Lost	Lost	Didn't get Bangle	Lost	Didn't get Bangle	Lost	Eliminated (Day 12)											
Divya	Didn't get Bangle		Lost		Lost	Won	Lost	Didn't get Bangle	Lost	Eliminated (Day 7)																
Ashlesha	Didn't get Bangle		Won		Lost	N/A	Lost	Got Bangle	Lost	Eliminated (Day 7)																
Poonam	Didn't get Bangle		Eliminated (Day 3)																							
Pratiksha	Didn't get Bangle		Eliminated (Day 3)																							
Reshma	Didn't get Bangle		Eliminated (Day 3)																							
Nisha	Didn't get Bangle		Eliminated (Day 3)																							
Elimination	No Elimination		Poonam	Reshma	No Elimination					Ashlesha	No Elimination				Sonal	No Elimination						Dhvani	Chandrani	Riya	Prantika	Neet
Elimination	No Elimination		Pratiksha	Nisha	No Elimination					Divya	No Elimination				Sonal	No Elimination						Bushra	Manpreet	Riya	Akanksha	

== Production ==
A music video titled Mika Di Vohti featuring Mika Singh released on 16 May 2022.

=== Promotion ===
Singh appeared in StarPlus serial Anupamaa to promote his show.

== Guest ==
Episode	Actor/Actress	Notes
Ep. 1	Kapil Sharma	Mika's Friend
Ep. 1	Krushna Abhishek	Comedian
Ep. 1	Daler Mehndi	Mika's brother
Ep. 1	Shaheer Sheikh	From Woh Toh Hai Albelaa
Ep. 1	Hiba Nawab	From Woh Toh Hai Albelaa
Ep. 1	Karan Wahi	From Channa Mereya
Ep. 1	Niyati Fatnani	From Channa Mereya
Ep. 1	Ishaan Dhawan	From Gud Se Meetha Ishq
Ep. 1	Pankhuri Awasthy Rode	From Gud Se Meetha Ishq
Ep. 4	Divyanka Tripathi	Special Appearance
Ep. 7	Raveena Tandon	Special Appearance
Ep. 11	Geeta Phogat	Special Appearance
Ep. 12	Farah Khan	Special Appearance
Ep. 13	Rahul Vaidya	Special Appearance
Ep. 13	Gurdeep Mehendi	Daler Mehndi's son
Ep. 14	Ajit Mehendi	Daler Mehndi's daughter
Ep. 16	Hina Khan	Special Appearance
Ep. 18	Terence Lewis	Special Appearance
Ep. 24	Rupal Patel	Special Appearance
Ep. 25	Rupali Ganguly	Special Appearance
Ep. 26	Guru Randhawa	Special Appearance

== See also ==
- List of programs broadcast by Star Bharat
