= Bhangarh Fort =

Historical fort in Rajasthan, India

- Rajasthan, India
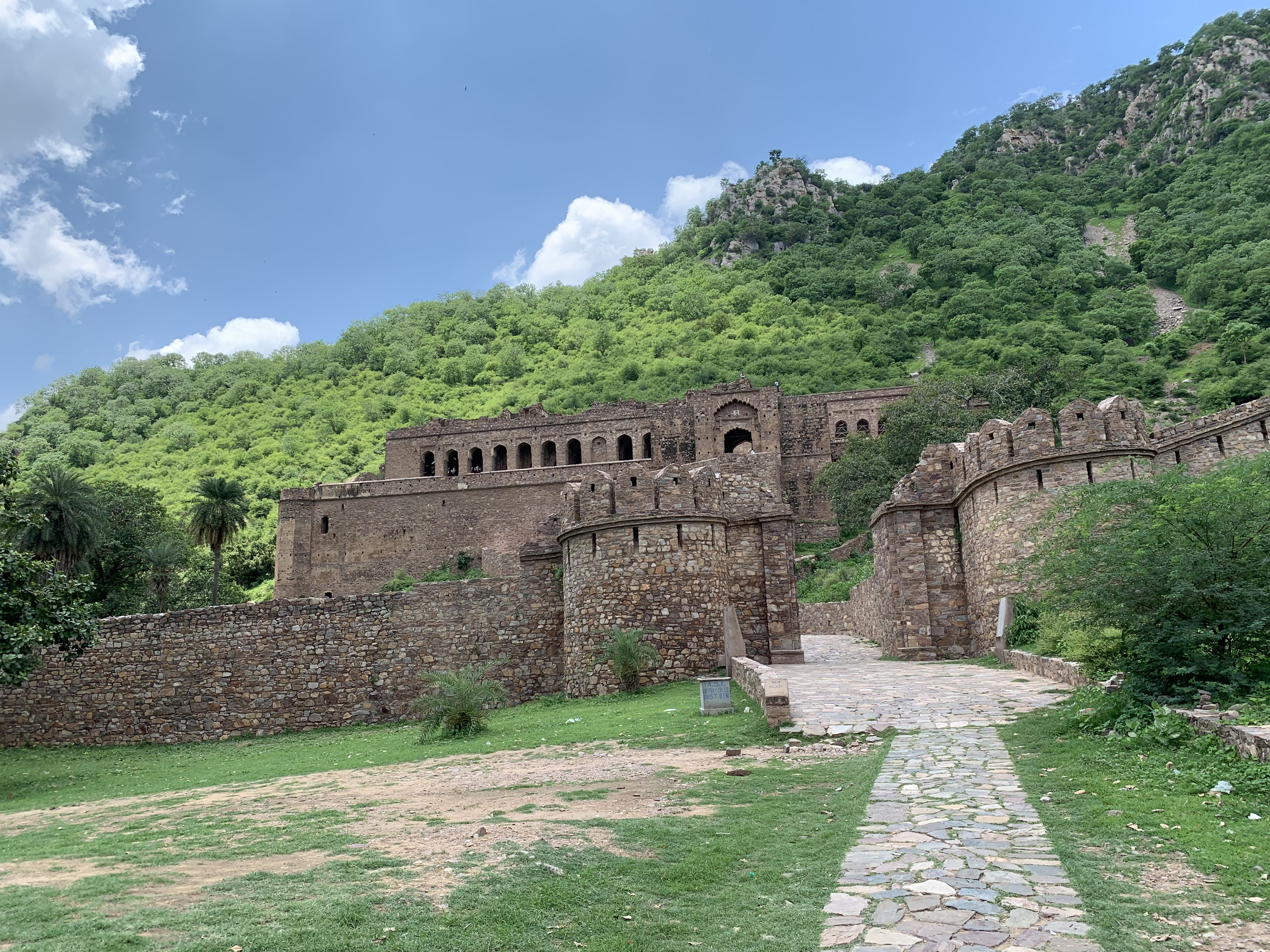
- Fortification gate looking towards the royal palace of Bhangarh

Site information
- Type: Fort
- Owner: Mihir Nagar (prior); Government of India (current)
- Open to the public: Yes
- Condition: Vacant; tourist attraction

Location
- Bhangarh Fort in Rajasthan
- Coordinates: 27°5′45″N 76°17′15″E

Site history
- Built: 1573; 453 years ago
- Built by: Bhagwant Das
- Materials: Stone and brick

The Bhangarh Fort is a 16th-century fort built in the Rajasthan state of India. The town was established during the rule of Bhagwant Das as the residence of his second son, Madho Singh. The fort and its precincts are well preserved.

== Geography ==
Bhangarh Fort is located on the border of the Sariska Reserve in the Aravali range of hills in the Alwar district of Rajasthan. The nearest village is Gola ka Baas.The fort is situated at the foot of the hills on sloping terrain. The ruins of the king's palace are located on the lower slope of the hills; trees surround the pond area and a natural stream falls into the pond within the premises of the palace.

The fort is located 235 kilometres (146 mi) from Delhi and the approach to the entrance gate of the fort in the last 2 kilometres (1.2 mi) stretch of the road is unpaved. The fort is 20 miles (32 km) from Thana Ghazi. The nearest airport is Jaipur International Airport, which is 88.2 km from the fort.

== Legends ==
According to legend, a sadhu lived within the fort area, and according to his injunction, any house built in the precinct of the fort should not be taller than his own, and if the shadow of any such house fell on his house, it would result in destruction of the fort town. When columns were added to the fort that cast a shadow on the sadhu's house, the result was destruction of the fort and surrounding towns. According to another tale, a priest who was a practitioner of black magic fell in love with a beautiful Bhangarh princess with many suitors. One day, the priest followed the princess to the marketplace and offered her a love potion. However, she refused it, throwing it onto a large rock that consequently rolled onto the priest and crushed him to death. Before he died, the priest cursed the entire village, condemning it to destruction and desolation.

== Layout and design ==
Entering through the main gate of the completely ruined fort city, one can find temples, palaces, and havelis. In addition, there are four more points of entry to the fort: the Lahori Gate, the Ajmeri Gate, the Phulbari Gate, and the Delhi Gate. At the entrance of the main gate are many Hindu temples, such as Hanuman Temple, Gopinath Temple, Someshwar Temple, Keshav Rai Temple, Mangla Devi Temple, Ganesh Temple, and Navin Temple. The Gopinath Temple is built above a 14 ft raised plinth, and yellow stones are used for the carvings of the temple. The residence of the priest, called the Purohitji Ki Haveli, is located in the precincts of the temple complex. Next in order is the Nachan Ki Haveli (dancer's palace) and Jauhari Bazar (market place), followed by the Gopinath Temple. The Royal Palace is located at the extreme end of the fort's limits.

The temples dedicated to Hanuman and Shiv Mahadev are built in the style of cenotaphs rather than temples. Jhiri marble has been used in their construction. A Muslim tomb found outside the gate of the fort is reported to be that of one of the sons of King Hari Singh.

== Gallery ==
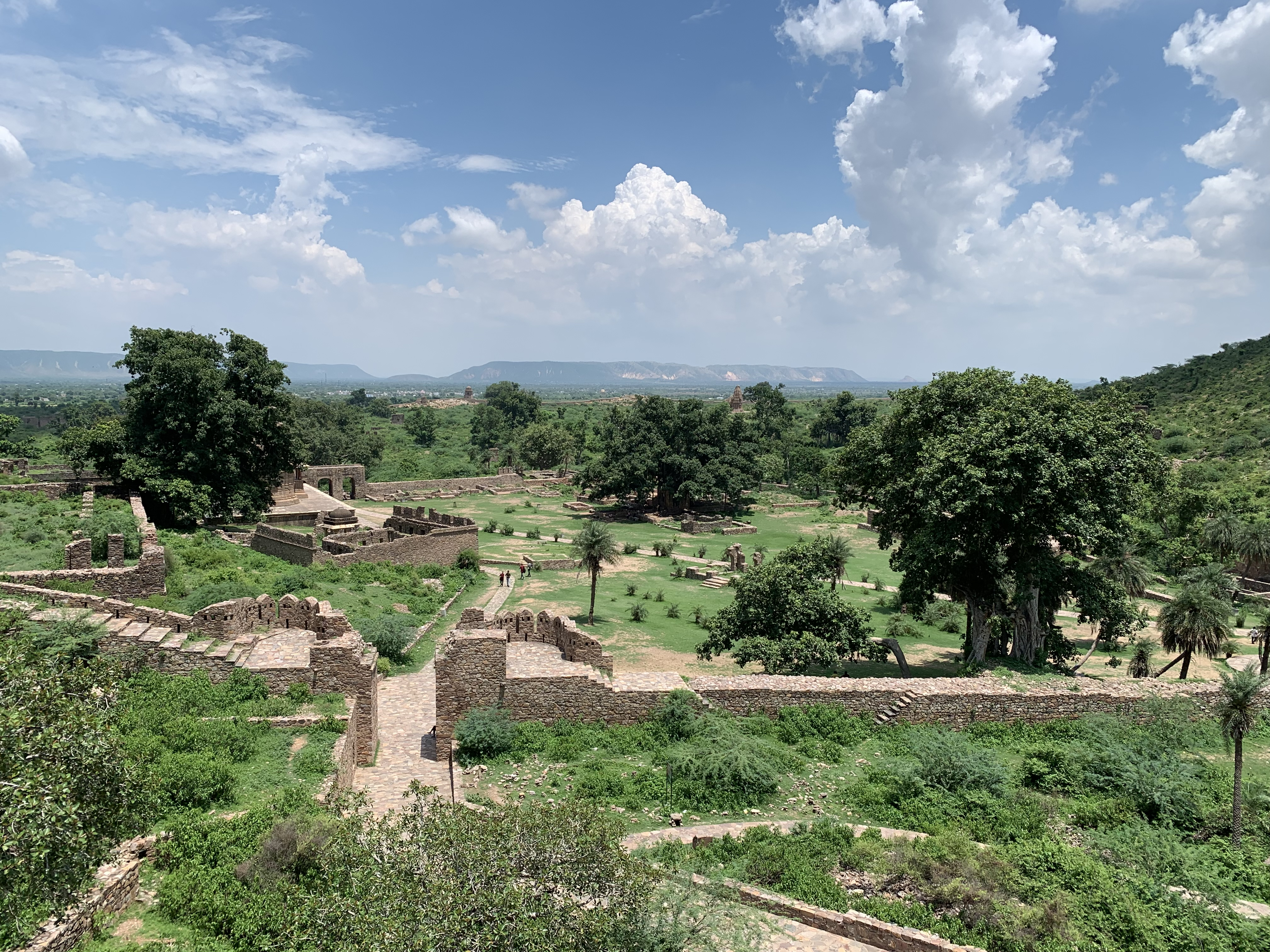
View of the inner fortified city, as seen from the royal palace

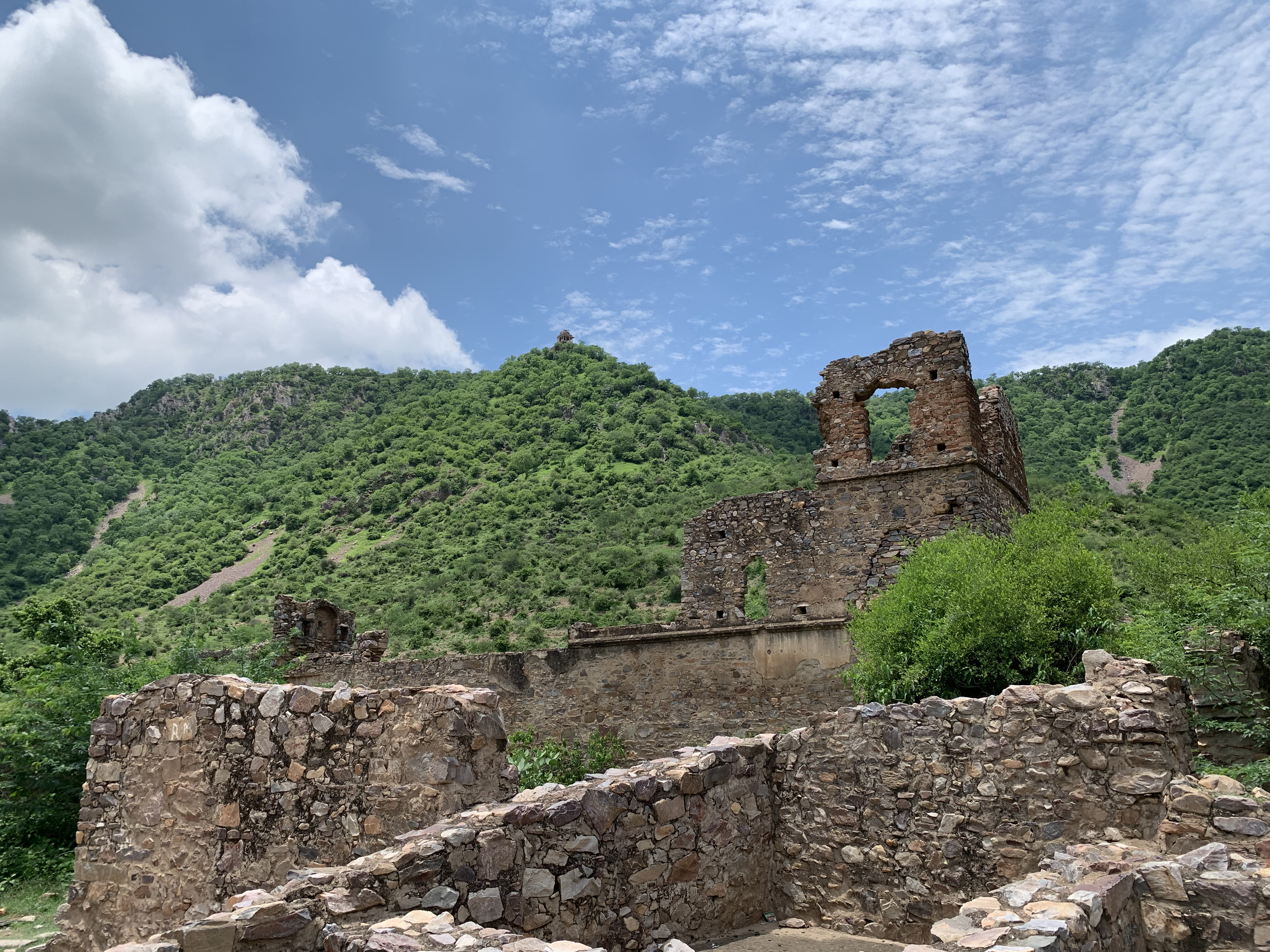
Ruins of the bazaar

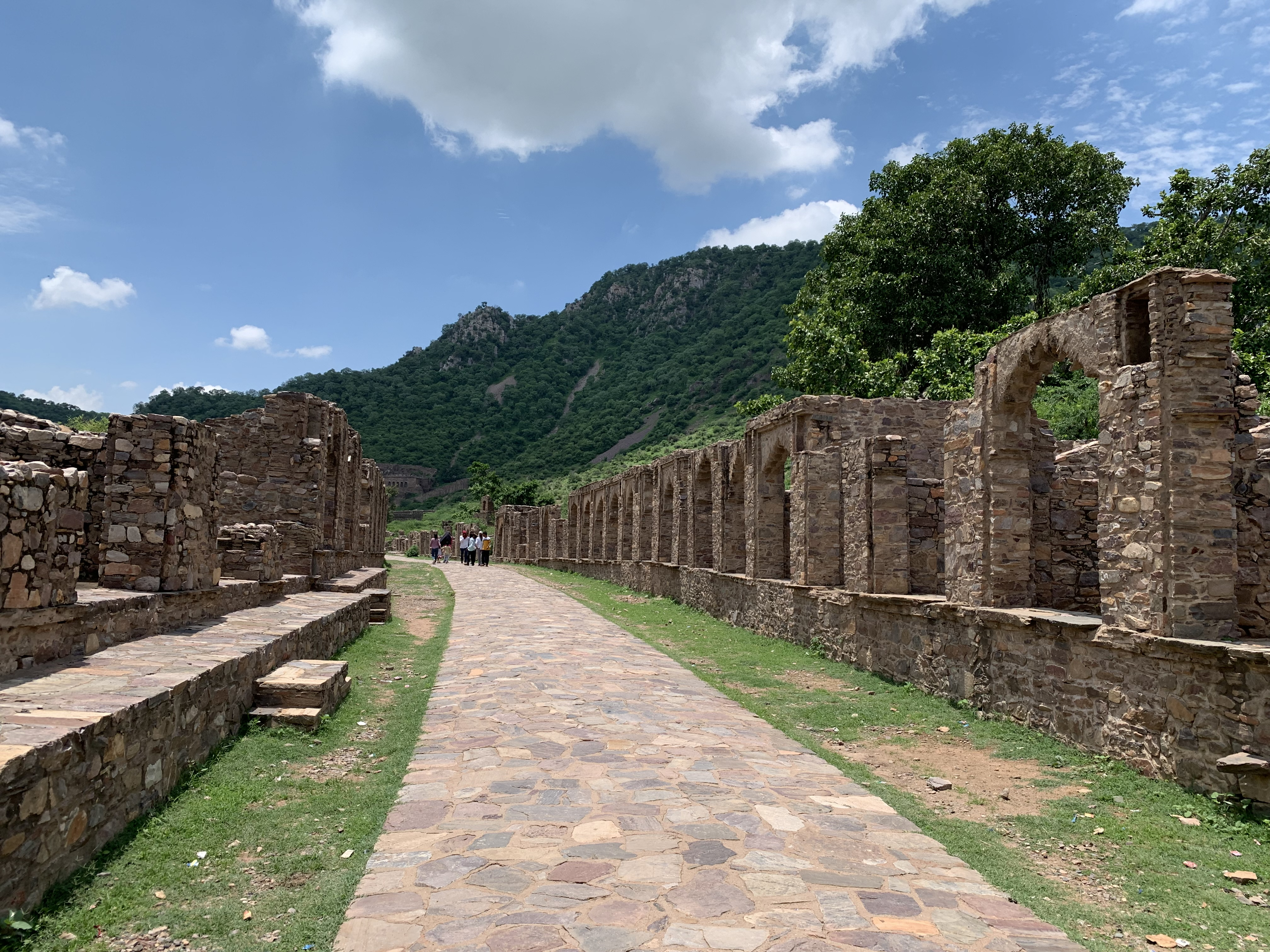
Bazaar street

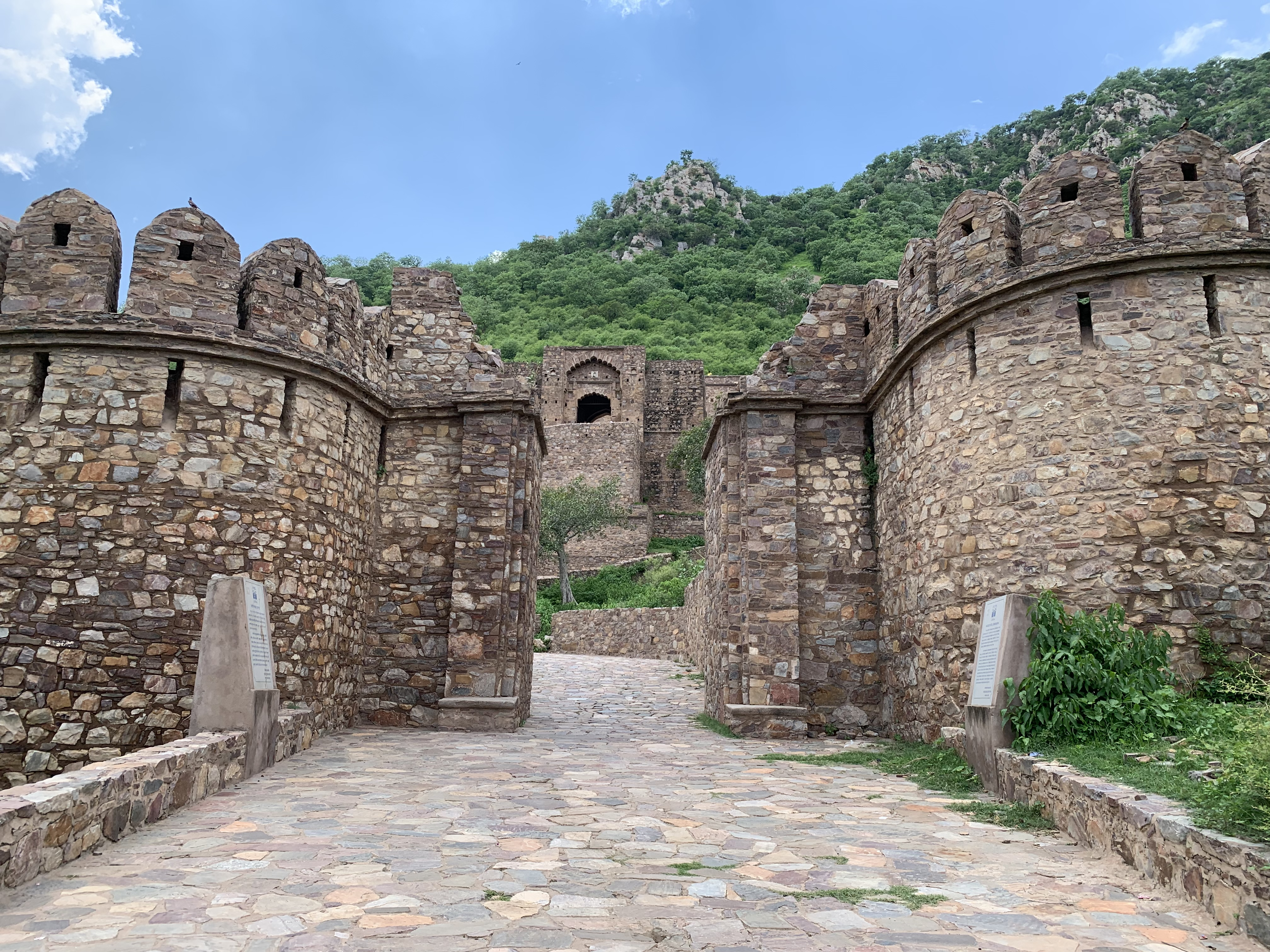
An entrance to the royal palace

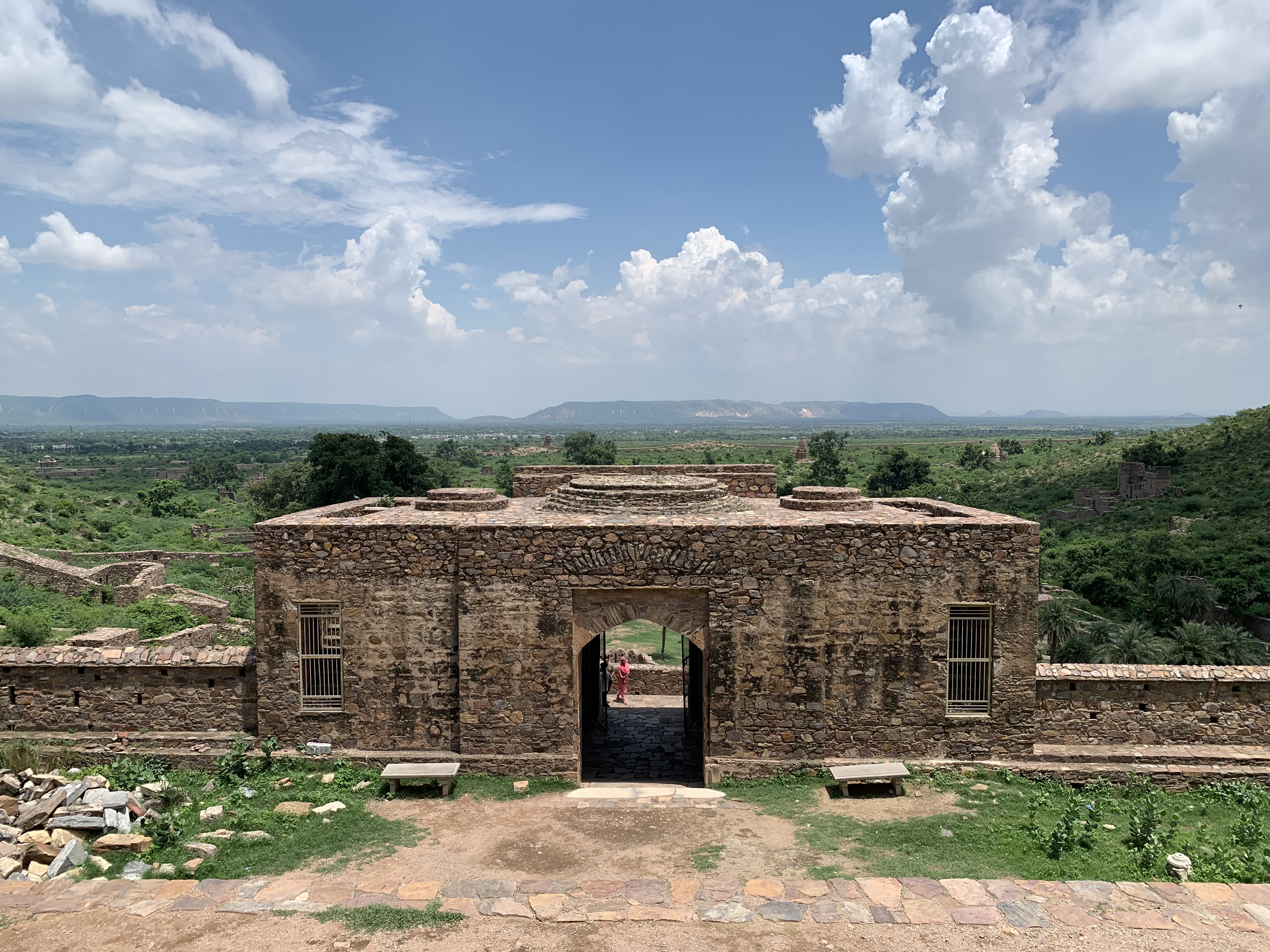
A view from the top of the royal palace

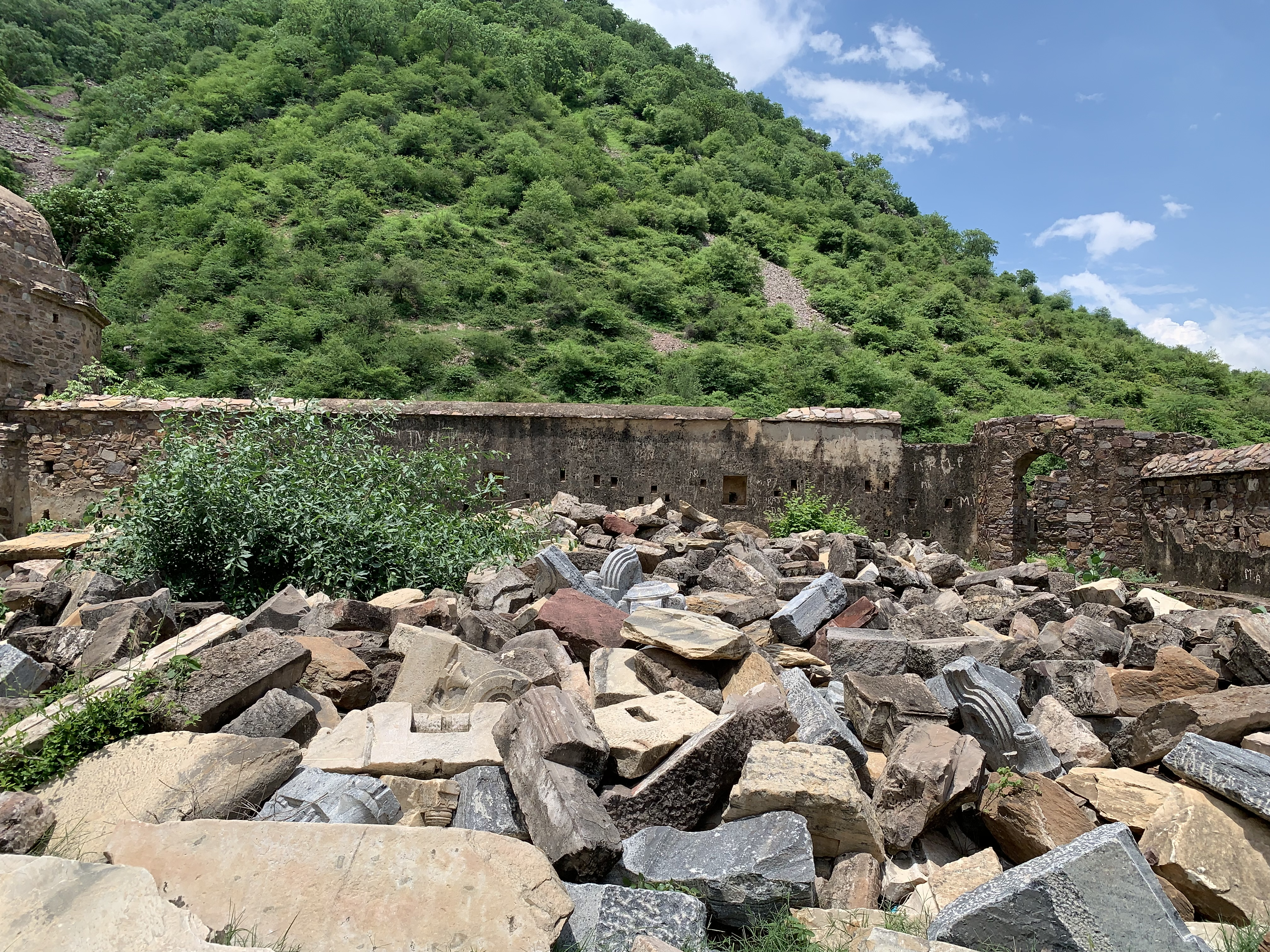
Ruins and discarded stones at the royal palace

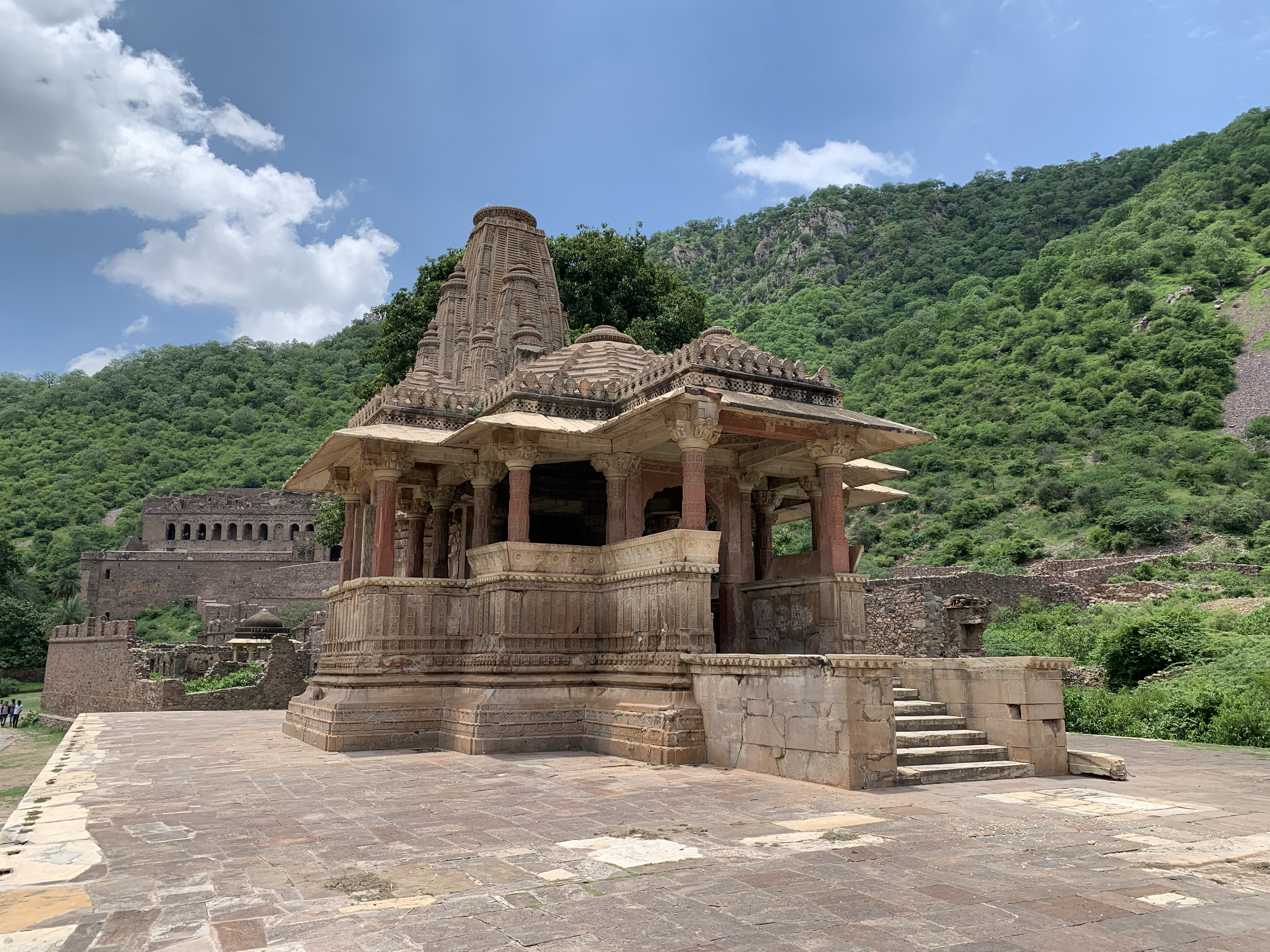
Gopinath Temple

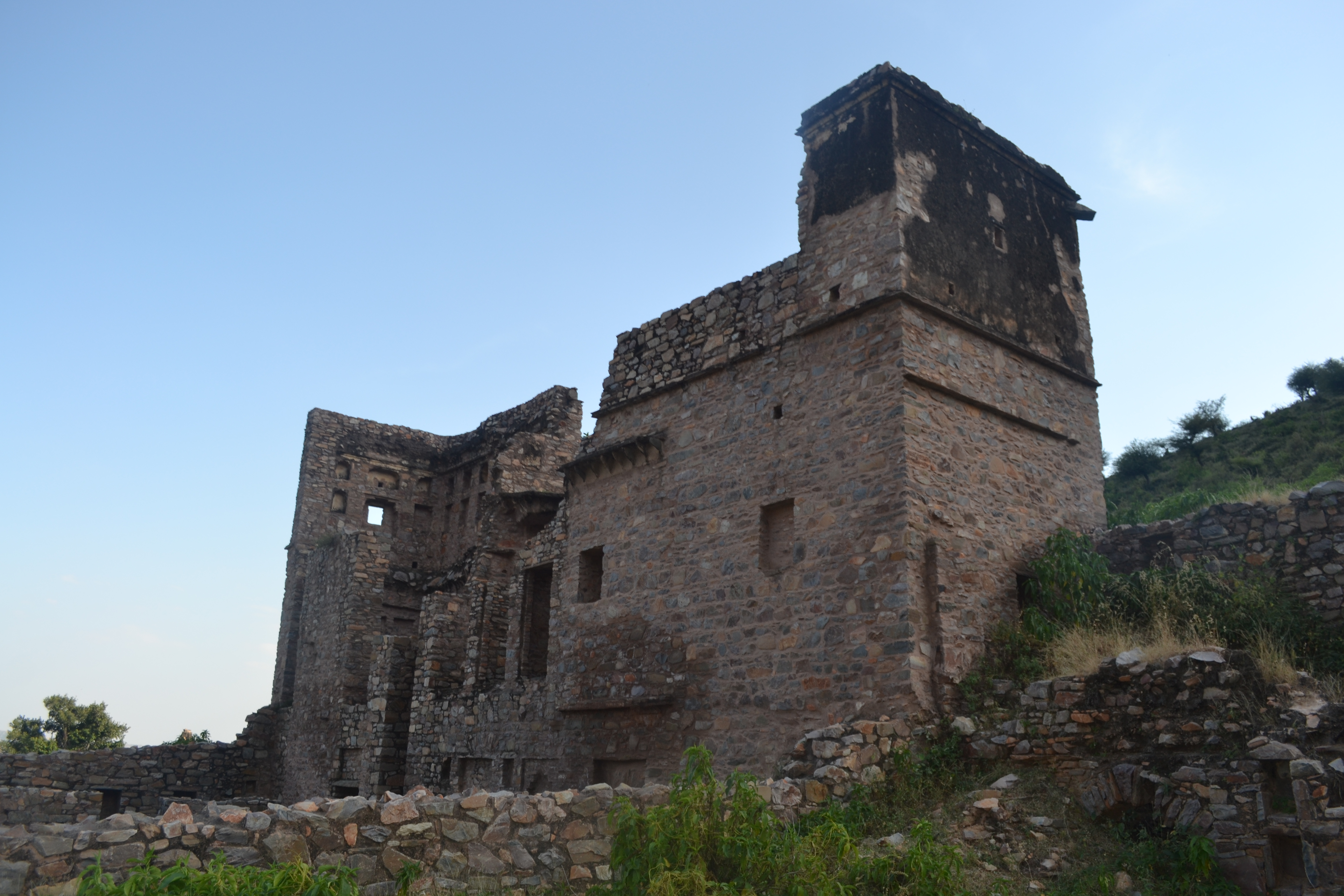
Haveli of the purohit

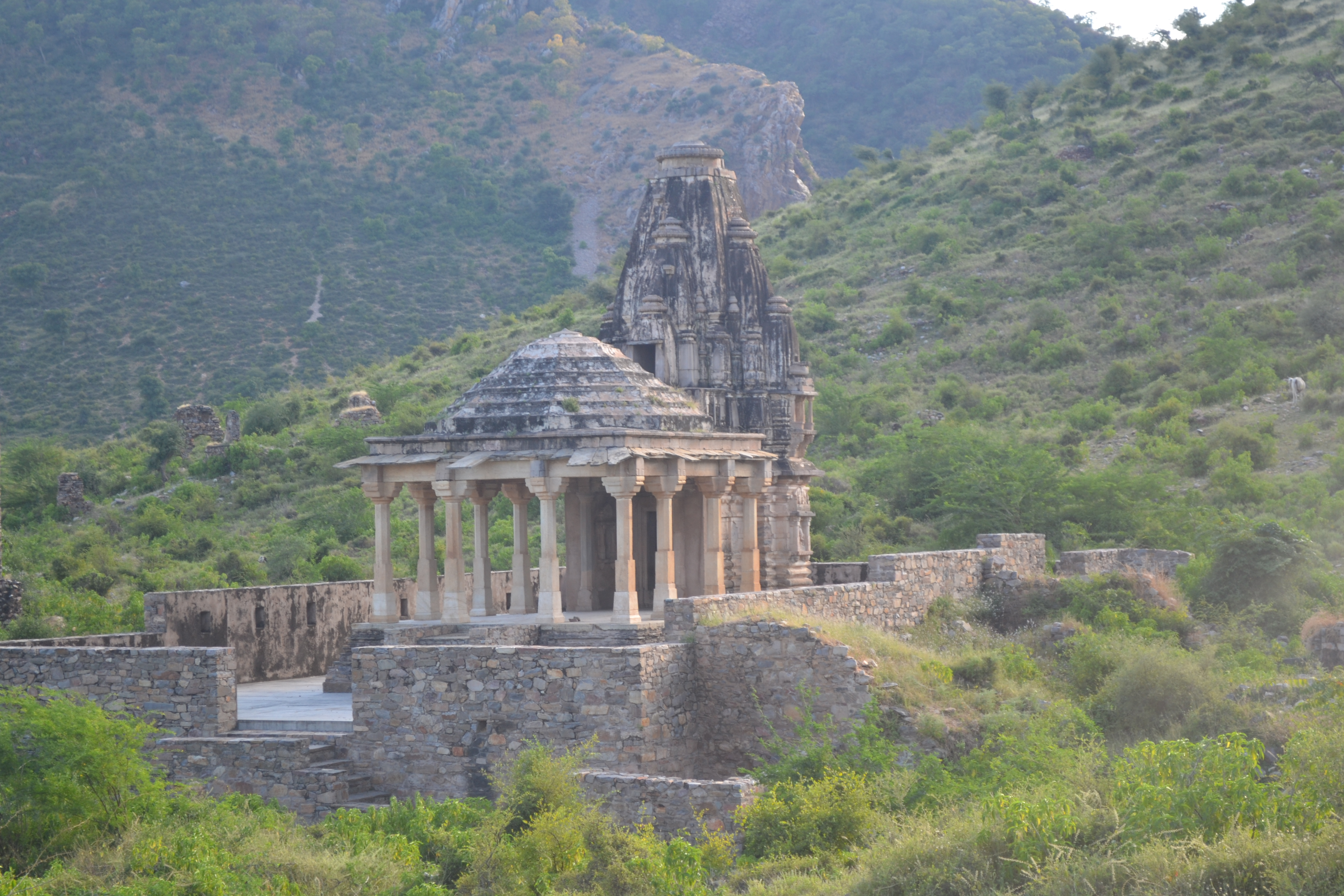
Kesav Rai Temple

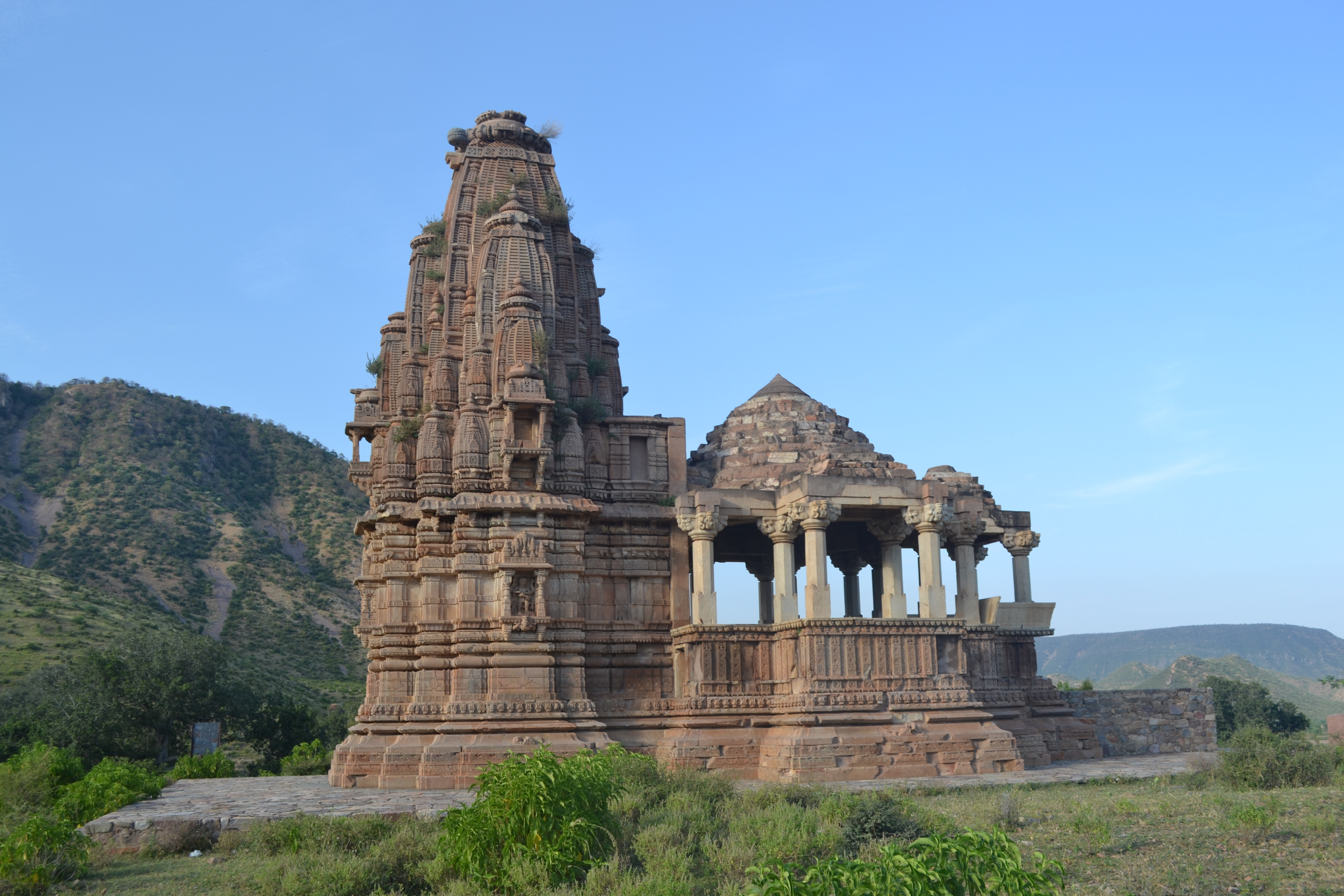
Mangla Devi Temple

== See also ==
- Hill Forts of Rajasthan
- Tourism in Rajasthan

== Bibliography ==
- Gaurav Madan (2017). Braving The Bhangarh - A Journey to Asia's most haunted ruins. Amazon Digital Serv. ASIN B071H9MJSG.
- Outlook (2006). 64 Wildlife Holidays in India. Outlook Pub. (India). ISBN 978-81-89449-02-5.
- Rajputana (1880). The Rajputana gazetteers.
- Singh, Sarina (15 September 2010). Lonely Planet India. Lonely Planet. ISBN 978-1-74220-347-8.
- Steven L. Stern (1 January 2011). Cursed Grounds. Bearport Publishing. ISBN 978-1-61772-147-2.
