= Rajkummar Rao filmography =

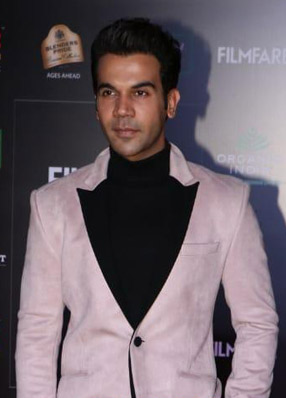
Rao in 2019

Rajkummar Rao is an Indian actor working in Hindi cinema. His notable films include Love Sex Aur Dhokha (2010), Talaash (2012), Kai Po Che! (2013), Shahid (2013), Queen (2014), Aligarh (2016), Trapped (2016), Bareilly Ki Barfi (2017), Newton (2017), Stree (2018), Ludo (2020), Badhaai Do (2022), Monica, O My Darling (2022), HIT: The First Case (2022), Srikanth (2024), Mr. & Mrs. Mahi (2024) and Stree 2 (2024).

== Films ==
Year	Title	Role	Notes	Ref(s)
2010	Rann	Newsreader	Uncredited appearance	
2010	Love Sex Aur Dhokha	Adarsh		
2010	Samjhana	Rajkummar	Short film	
2010	Uss Din	Ashish	Short film	
2011	Ragini MMS	Uday Singh		
2011	Shaitan	Inspector Devraj / Pintyalabhan (Malwankar)		
2012	Gangs of Wasseypur 2	Shamshad Alam		
2012	Chittagong	Lokenath Bal		
2012	Talaash	Devrath Kulkarni		
2013	Kai Po Che!	Govind Patel		
2013	Shahid	Shahid Azmi		
2013	Boyss Toh Boyss Hain	Abhishek		
2014	CityLights	Deepak		
2014	Queen	Vijay Dhingra		
2015	Dolly Ki Doli	Sonu Sherawat		
2015	Hamari Adhuri Kahani	Hari Prasad		
2016	Aligarh	Deepu Sebastian		
2017	Trapped	Shaurya		
2017	Behen Hogi Teri	Shiv Nautiyal "Gattu"		
2017	Bareilly Ki Barfi	Pritam Vidrohi		
2017	Newton	Nutan "Newton" Kumar		
2017	Shaadi Mein Zaroor Aana	IAS Satyendra Mishra		
2017	Raabta	Muwaqqit	Cameo	
2018	Fanney Khan	Adhir		
2018	Omerta	Ahmed Omar Saeed Sheikh "Omerta"		
2018	Stree	Vicky		
2018	Love Sonia	Manish		
2018	5 Weddings	Harbhajan Singh	American film	
2019	Ek Ladki Ko Dekha Toh Aisa Laga	Sahil Mirza		
2019	Judgementall Hai Kya	Keshav		
2019	Made in China	Raghu Mehta		
2020	Shimla Mirchi	Avinash	Delayed release; Filmed in 2014	
2020	Ludo	Alok Kumar Gupta		
2020	Chhalaang	Mahendra Hooda		
2021	The White Tiger	Ashok Batra	English film	
2021	Roohi	Bhawra Pandey		
2021	Hum Do Hamare Do	Dhruv Shikhar		
2022	Badhaai Do	Shardul Thakur		
2022	HIT: The First Case	Inspector Vikram Rao		
2022	Monica, O My Darling	Jayant Arkhedkar		
2022	Bhediya	Vicky	Cameo appearance	
2023	Bheed	Inspector Surya Kumar Singh Tikas		
2024	Srikanth	Srikanth Bolla		
2024	Wild Wild Punjab	—N/a	Narrator	
2024	Mr. & Mrs. Mahi	Mahendra Aggarwal		
2024	Stree 2	Vicky		
2024	Vicky Vidya Ka Woh Wala Video	Vicky Babla		
2024	Naam	—N/a	Narrator	
2025	Bhool Chuk Maaf	Ranjan Tiwari		
2025	Maalik	Deepak / Maalik		
2026	Toaster	Ramakant urf Ramu		
2026	Prahaar: The Untold Story of Ujjwal Nikam	Ujjwal Nikam		
2026	Raftaar †	TBA	Filming	
2027	Dada: The Sourav Ganguly story †	Sourav Ganguly	Filming	

== Television ==
Year	Title	Role	Notes	Ref(s)
2017	Bose: Dead/Alive	Netaji Subhas Chandra Bose		
2023	Guns & Gulaabs	Paana "Spanner" Tipu / Tiger Tipu		
2025	The Ba***ds of Bollywood	Himself	Cameo	

== Music video ==
Year	Title	Singer(s)	Ref.
2023	"Achha Sila Diya"	B Praak	
