= List of awards and nominations received by Rajkummar Rao =

Rajkummar Rao awards and nominations
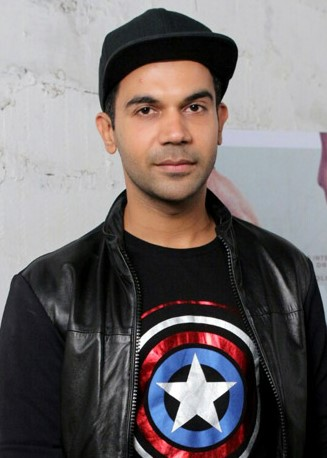
- Rao in 2017
Awards and nominations
Award	Wins	Nominations
National Film Awards	1	0
Filmfare Awards	5	12
Star Screen Awards	2	2
IIFA Awards	0	4
Asian Film Awards	0	1
Asia Pacific Screen Awards	1	0
CNN-IBN Indian of the Year	1	0
GQ Men of the Year Awards	1	0
International Film Festivals & Awards Macao	1	0
Indian Film Festival	1	0
News18 Movie Awards	1	3
PETA's Hottest Vegetarian Celebrity	1	0
Producers Guild Awards	0	2
Zee Cine Awards	2	3
Other awards	0	12

Totals (Note: Certain award groups do not simply award one winner. They acknowledge several different recipients, have runners-up, and have third place. Since this is a specific recognition and is different from losing an award, runner-up mentions are considered wins in this award tally. For simplification and to avoid errors, each award in this list has been presumed to have had a prior nomination.)
- Wins: 19
- Nominations: 29

Rajkummar Rao is an Indian actor who works in the Hindi film industry. He has received four Filmfare Awards, two Screen Awards and two Zee Cine Awards. He began his career with the experimental anthology film Love Sex Aur Dhokha (2010). After a few brief roles, he had his breakthrough with the drama film Kai Po Che! (2013). He rose to prominence with his portrayal of Shahid Azmi in the critically acclaimed biographical drama Shahid (2013), for which he was awarded the National Film Award for Best Actor and Filmfare Award for Best Actor (Critics). Trapped (2017) earned him another Filmfare Award for Best Actor (Critics).

== Asian Film Awards ==
Year	Nominated work	Category	Result	Ref.
2018	Newton	Best Actor	Nominated	

== Asia Pacific Screen Awards ==
Year	Nominated work	Category	Result	Ref.
2017	Newton	Best Performance by an Actor	Won	

== CNN-IBN Indian of the Year ==
Year	Nominated work	Category	Result	Ref.
2017	—N/a	Entertainment	Won	

== Filmfare Awards ==
Year	Nominated work	Category	Result	Ref.
2014	Shahid	Best Actor (Critics)	Won	
2014	Kai Po Che!	Best Supporting Actor	Nominated	
2017	Aligarh	Best Supporting Actor	Nominated	
2018	Bareilly Ki Barfi	Best Supporting Actor	Won	
2018	Newton	Best Actor (Critics)	Nominated	
2018	Trapped	Best Actor (Critics)	Won	
2019	Stree	Best Actor	Nominated	
2020	Judgementall Hai Kya	Best Actor (Critics)	Nominated	
2021	Ludo	Best Actor (Critics)	Nominated	
2021	Ludo	Best Actor	Nominated	
2023	Badhaai Do	Best Actor	Won	
2023	Badhaai Do	Best Actor (Critics)	Nominated	
2024	Bheed	Best Actor (Critics)	Nominated	
2025	Stree 2	Best Actor	Nominated	
2025	Srikanth	Best Actor (Critics)	Won	

== Indian Film Festival of Melbourne ==
Year	Nominated work	Category	Result	Ref.
2017	Trapped	Best Actor (Special Mention)	Won	

== IIFA Awards ==
Year	Nominated work	Category	Result	Ref.
2017	Aligarh	Best Supporting Actor	Nominated	
2018	Bareilly Ki Barfi	Best Supporting Actor	Nominated	
2018	Newton	Best Actor	Nominated	
2019	Stree	Best Actor	Nominated	
2025	Srikanth	Best Actor	Nominated	

== National Film Awards ==
Year	Nominated work	Category	Result	Ref.
2013	Shahid	Best Actor	Won	

== PETA ==
Year	Nominated work	Category	Result	Ref.
2017	—N/a	Hottest Vegetarian	Won	

== Producers Guild Film Awards ==
Year	Nominated work	Category	Result	Ref.
2014	Shahid	Best Actor in a Leading Role	Nominated	
2015	Citylights	Best Actor in a Leading Role	Nominated	

== Star Screen Awards ==
Year	Nominated work	Category	Result	Ref.
2014	Kai Po Che!	Best Actor in a Supporting Role (Male)	Nominated	
2015	Queen	Best Actor in a Supporting Role (Male)	Nominated	
2017	Bareilly Ki Barfi	Best Actor in a Supporting Role (Male)	Won	
2017	Newton	Best Actor (Critics)	Won	
2018	Stree	Best Actor (Male)	Won	

== Zee Cine Awards ==
Year	Nominated work	Category	Result	Ref.
2014	Kai Po Che!	Best Supporting Actor	Won	
2017	Aligarh	Best Supporting Actor	Nominated	
2018	Bareilly Ki Barfi	Best Supporting Actor	Nominated	
2018	Newton	Best Actor – Male (Jury's Choice)	Nominated	
2018	—N/a	Extraordinary Impact Award (Male)	Won	

== See also ==
- List of accolades received by Queen
