= Filmfare Critics Award for Best Actor =

Award for Hindi films

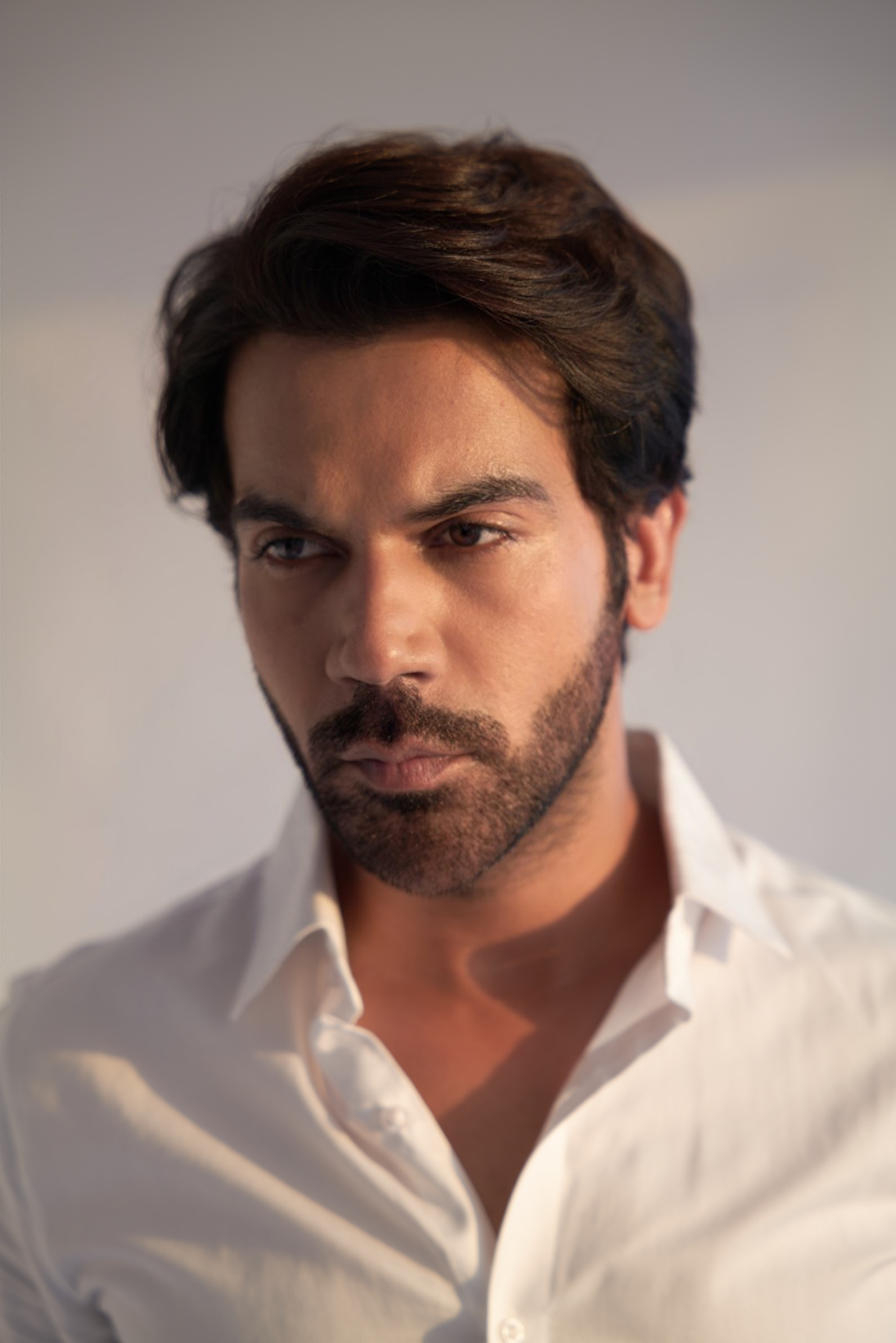
- The 2025 recipient: Rajkummar Rao
- Awarded for: Best Performance by an Actor in a Leading Role
- Country: India
- Presented by: Filmfare
- First award: Anupam Kher, Daddy (1991)
- Currently held by: Rajkummar Rao, Srikanth (2025)
- Website: Filmfare Awards

The Filmfare Critics Award for Best Actor is an award in India given by Filmfare as part of its annual Filmfare Awards for Hindi films.

== Superlatives ==
- The record of the maximum number of wins in this category is with Amitabh Bachchan having won the award 4 times (2002, 2006, 2016 & 2021); Manoj Bajpai (1999, 2000 & 2017) and Rajkummar Rao (2014,2018 & 2025) won three times, followed by three actors (in chronological order): Shahrukh Khan (1994 & 2001), Ranbir Kapoor (2010 & 2012) and Ayushmann Khurrana (2019 & 2020).
- Rajkummar Rao also holds the record for the maximum number of nominations in the category (7), followed by Amitabh Bachchan with 5 nominations, and Ranbir Kapoor and Manoj Bajpayee with 4 nominations each.
- There have been two ties in this category's history, between Manoj Bajpayee and Shahid Kapoor for Aligarh and Udta Punjab respectively (2017); and between Ayushmann Khurrana and Ranveer Singh for Andhadhun and Padmaavat respectively (2019).
- 2 actors have won the award in consecutive years; they are Manoj Bajpayee (1999 & 2000) and Ayushmann Khurrana (2019–20).
- 4 actors have won both the Critics and Popular categories in the same year, three for the same film: Hrithik Roshan for Koi... Mil Gaya in 2004, Amitabh Bachchan for Black in 2006 and Ranbir Kapoor for Rockstar in 2012. Shah Rukh Khan is the first and only actor so far to win both categories in the same year in 1994 for 2 different films, with Best Actor (Popular) for Baazigar and Best Actor (Critics) for Kabhi Haan Kabhi Naa.
- Aamir Khan, Shah Rukh Khan, Hrithik Roshan, Shahid Kapoor, Ranbir Kapoor and Ranveer Singh have all won awards also for Best Male Debut and Best Actor while Ayushmann Khurrana has won for Best Male Debut and Best Male Playback singer.
- Anil Kapoor, Irrfan Khan, Rishi Kapoor, Anupam Kher, Amitabh Bachchan and Rajkummar Rao have all won awards for Best Actor and Best Supporting Actor.
- Ajay Devgn (The Legend of Bhagat Singh), Amitabh Bachchan (Black and Piku), Rajkummar Rao (Shahid), Irrfan Khan (Paan Singh Tomar) and Ayushmann Khurrana (Andhadhun) have all won the National Film Award for Best Actor, while Anupam Kher (Daddy) received a National Film Award – Special Jury Award / Special Mention (Film Critic) and Manoj Bajpai (Satya) and Pankaj Kapoor (Maqbool) have won National Film Award for Best Supporting Actor.

== Multiple Wins ==
| Wins | Recipient |
|---|---|
| 4 | Amitabh Bachchan |
| 3 | Manoj Bajpayee, Rajkummar Rao |
| 2 | Shah Rukh Khan, Ranbir Kapoor, Ayushmann Khurrana, Sanjay Mishra |

== Multiple Nominations ==
| Nominations | Recipient |
|---|---|
| 7 | Rajkummar Rao |
| 5 | Amitabh Bachchan |
| 4 | Ranbir Kapoor, Manoj Bajpayee |

== List of winners ==
=== Outstanding Performance In A Non-Commercial Film ===
(Between 1991 and 1992, there was one special category known as the Outstanding Performance In A Non-Commercial Film, and was awarded without prior nomination to acknowledge an actor of either sex.)

| Year | Photos of winners | Actor | Role | Film |
|---|---|---|---|---|
| 1991 (36th) | | Anupam Kher ‡ | Anand | Daddy |
| 1992 (37th) | Award Won by an Actress | | | |

=== Critics Award for Best Performance ===
(From 1993 until 1997, there was one special category known as the Critics Award for Best Performance, and was awarded without prior nomination to acknowledge an actor of either sex.)

| Year | Photos of winners | Actor | Role | Film |
|---|---|---|---|---|
| 1993 (38th) | Award Won by an Actress | | | |
| 1994 (39th) | | Shah Rukh Khan ‡ | Sunil | Kabhi Haan Kabhi Naa |
| 1995 (40th) | Award Won by an Actress | | | |
| 1996 (41st) | Award Won by an Actress | | | |
| 1997 (42nd) | Award Won by an Actress | | | |

=== Filmfare Critics Award for Best Actor ===
(The category is officially divided into two separate categories to acknowledge both male and female actors individually.)

==== 1990s ====
| Year | Photos of winners | Actor | Role | Film |
|---|---|---|---|---|
| 1998 (43rd) | | Anil Kapoor ‡ | Shakti Thakur | Virasat |
| 1999 (44th) | | Manoj Bajpai ‡ | Bhiku Mhatre | Satya |

==== 2000s ====
| Year | Photos of winners | Actor | Role | Film |
|---|---|---|---|---|
| 2000 (45th) | | Manoj Bajpai ‡ | Inspector Samar Pratap Singh | Shool |
| 2001 (46th) | | Shah Rukh Khan ‡ | Raj Aryan Malhotra | Mohabbatein |
| 2002 (47th) | | Amitabh Bachchan ‡ | Inspector Manu Verma | Aks |
| 2003 (48th) | | Ajay Devgn ‡ | N. Malik; Bhagat Singh | Company; The Legend of Bhagat Singh |
| 2004 (49th) | | Hrithik Roshan ‡ | Rohit Mehra | Koi... Mil Gaya |
| 2005 (50th) | | Pankaj Kapur ‡ | Jahangir Khan (Abbaji) | Maqbool |
| 2006 (51st) | | Amitabh Bachchan ‡ | Debraj Sahai | Black |
| 2007 (52nd) | | Aamir Khan ‡ | Daljit "DJ" Singh | Rang De Basanti |
| 2008 (53rd) | | Darsheel Safary ‡ | Ishaan "Inu" Awasthi | Taare Zameen Par |
| 2009 (54th) | | Manjot Singh ‡ | Young Lucky | Oye Lucky! Lucky Oye! |

==== 2010s ====
| Year | Photos of winners | Actor | Role | Film |
|---|---|---|---|---|
| 2010 (55th) | | Ranbir Kapoor ‡ | Siddharth "Sid" Mehra; Prem Shankar Sharma; Harpreet Singh Bedi | Wake Up Sid; Ajab Prem Ki Ghazab Kahani; Rocket Singh: Salesman of the Year |
| 2011 (56th) | | Rishi Kapoor ‡ | Santosh Duggal | Do Dooni Chaar |
| 2012 (57th) | | Ranbir Kapoor ‡ | Janardhan "Jordan" Jhakhar / JJ | Rockstar |
| 2013 (58th) | | Irrfan Khan ‡ | Paan Singh Tomar | Paan Singh Tomar |
| 2014 (59th) | | Rajkummar Rao ‡ | Shahid Azmi | Shahid |
| 2015 (60th) | | Sanjay Mishra ‡ | Bauji | Ankhon Dekhi |
| 2016 (61st) | | Amitabh Bachchan ‡ | Bhashkor Banerjee | Piku |
| 2017 (62nd) | | Manoj Bajpayee ‡ | Prof. Ramchandra Siras | Aligarh |
| 2017 (62nd) | | Shahid Kapoor ‡ | Tejinder "Tommy" Singh a.k.a. Gabru | Udta Punjab |
| 2018 (63rd) | | Rajkummar Rao ‡ | Shaurya | Trapped |
| 2018 (63rd) | | Irrfan Khan | Raj Batra | Hindi Medium |
| 2018 (63rd) | | Rajkummar Rao | Nutan "Newton" Kumar | Newton |
| 2018 (63rd) | | Ranbir Kapoor | Jagga | Jagga Jasoos |
| 2018 (63rd) | | Vikrant Massey | Shyamal "Shutu" Chatterjee | A Death in the Gunj |
| 2019 (64th) | | Ayushmann Khurrana ‡ | Akash Saraf | Andhadhun |
| 2019 (64th) | | Ranveer Singh ‡ | Alauddin Khalji | Padmaavat |
| 2019 (64th) | | Nawazuddin Siddiqui | Saadat Hasan Manto | Manto |
| 2019 (64th) | | Ranbir Kapoor | Sanjay Dutt | Sanju |
| 2019 (64th) | | Varun Dhawan | Danish "Dan" Walia | October |
| 2019 (64th) | | Vineet Kumar Singh | Shravan Kumar Singh | Mukkabaaz |

==== 2020s ====
| Year | Photos of winners | Actor | Role | Film |
|---|---|---|---|---|
| 2020 (65th) | | Ayushmann Khurrana ‡ | Additional SP Ayan Ranjan | Article 15 |
| 2020 (65th) | | Akshaye Khanna | Tarun Saluja | Section 375 |
| 2020 (65th) | | Nawazuddin Siddiqui | Rafiullah "Rafi" | Photograph |
| 2020 (65th) | | Rajkummar Rao | Keshav Kumar / Shravan | Judgementall Hai Kya |
| 2021 (66th) | | Amitabh Bachchan ‡ | Chunan "Mirza" Nawab | Gulabo Sitabo |
| 2021 (66th) | | Gajraj Rao | Shankar Tripathi | Shubh Mangal Zyada Saavdhan |
| 2021 (66th) | | Irrfan Khan | Champak Ghasiteram Bansal | Angrezi Medium |
| 2021 (66th) | | Rajkummar Rao | Alok “Alu” Kumar Gupta | Ludo |
| 2021 (66th) | | Sanjay Mishra | Sudhir | Kaamyaab |
| 2021 (66th) | | Shardul Bhardwaj | Anjani Prasad | Eeb Allay Ooo! |
| 2022 (67th) | | Vicky Kaushal ‡ | Udham Singh | Sardar Udham |
| 2022 (67th) | | Abhishek Bachchan | Bob Biswas | Bob Biswas |
| 2022 (67th) | | Pratik Gandhi | Raja Ram Joshi | Bhavai |
| 2022 (67th) | | Ranveer Singh | Kapil Dev | 83 |
| 2022 (67th) | | Vikrant Massey | Rishabh Saxena | Haseen Dilruba |
| 2023 (68th) | | Sanjay Mishra ‡ | Shambhunath Mishra | Vadh |
| 2023 (68th) | | Amitabh Bachchan | Vijay Borade | Jhund |
| 2023 (68th) | | R. Madhavan | Nambi Narayanan | Rocketry: The Nambi Effect |
| 2023 (68th) | | Rajkummar Rao | Shardul Thakur | Badhaai Do |
| 2023 (68th) | | Shahid Kapoor | Arjun Talwar | Jersey |
| 2023 (68th) | | Varun Dhawan | Bhaskar Sharma | Bhediya |
| 2024 (69th) | | Vikrant Massey ‡ | Manoj Kumar Sharma | 12th Fail |
| 2024 (69th) | | Abhishek Bachchan | Padam “Paddy” Singh Sodhi | Ghoomer |
| 2024 (69th) | | Jaideep Ahlawat | Pradeep Kamat | Three of Us |
| 2024 (69th) | | Rajkummar Rao | Surya Kumar Singh Tikas | Bheed |
| 2024 (69th) | | Manoj Bajpayee | Dasru / Bala | Joram |
| 2024 (69th) | | Pankaj Tripathi | Kanti Sharan Mudgal | OMG 2 |
| 2024 (69th) | | Vicky Kaushal | Sam Manekshaw | Sam Bahadur |
| 2025 (70th) | | Rajkummar Rao ‡ | Srikanth Bolla | Srikanth |
| 2025 (70th) | | Abhishek Bachchan | Arjun Sen | I Want to Talk |
| 2025 (70th) | | Pratik Gandhi | Pratik Garodia "Pinku" | Madgaon Express |
| 2025 (70th) | | Randeep Hooda | Vinayak Damodar Savarkar | Swatantrya Veer Savarkar |
| 2025 (70th) | | Sparsh Shrivastava | Deepak kumar | Laapataa Ladies |

== See also ==
- Filmfare Awards
- Bollywood
- Cinema of India
