= Anish John =

Film sound designer, and mixer

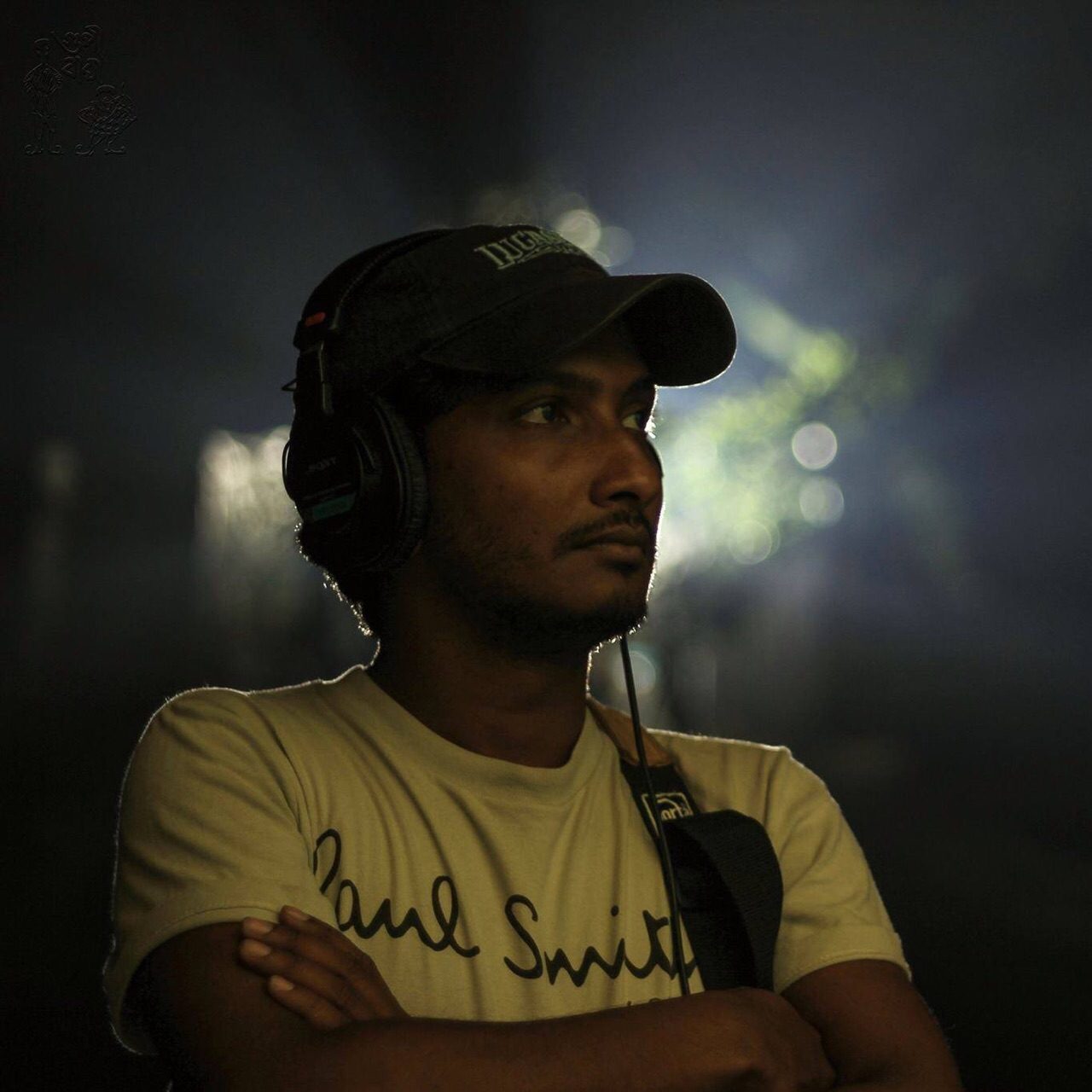
- Born: Kolkata, India
- Occupation: Film sound design
- Years active: 2008 – present

Anish John is a filmmaker, sound designer, and sound mixer. He won the National Award for Best Sound Design (Best Audiography) for the film Labour of Love (Asha Jaoar Majhe, 2014). He bagged the Best Sound Design award at the 63rd Filmfare Awards, for the film Trapped (2017). He is the Sound Designer of the acclaimed Netflix series 'Sacred Games'. He was also the production sound mixer for Newton (2017) among other accomplishments. Anish has worked in English, Hindi, Bengali, Tamil, Malayalam, and Marathi films, besides having worked on numerous documentaries and creative advertisement projects.

== Early life ==
Born and raised in Kolkata, Anish did his schooling at Don Bosco School, Park Circus, and continued with college in the city itself, at St. Xaviers College. He then pursued his higher education, focusing on a formal film education, doing a three years course in Film Sound from the Film and Television Institute of India, Pune (FTII).

== Career ==
Anish moved to Mumbai after his graduation. He started his career as a sound recordist and editor for various shorts, narrative features and documentaries before shifting to sound-designing and mixing. His projects span a wide range from Indian narrative features, Ship Of Theseus (Toronto 2012), I.D.(2012), to noted International film and TV productions, such as Million Dollar Arm (2014) and 24 (Indian TV series 2013).

== Filmography ==
- Toaster - (2025)
- Maalik - (2025)
- Kesari Chapter 2 - (2025)
- Dhoom Dhaam - (2025)
- Badhaai Do - (2022)
- Jugjugg Jeeyo - (2022)
- Bell Bottom - (2021)
- Sherni - (2021)
- Bulbbul - (2020)
- Bhoot – Part One: The Haunted Ship - (2020)
- Cargo - (2019)
- Laal Kaptaan - (2019)
- The Sky Is Pink - (2019)
- Sacred Games (2018–19)
- Karwan - (2018)
- High Jack (2018)
- Pari (2018)
- Newton (2017)
- Trapped (2017)
- Ezra (2017)
- Kingdom Of Clay Subjects (2015)
- Blue Mountains (2015)
- Million Dollar Arm (2nd unit – India schedule) (2014 – Disney)
- Asha Jaoar Majhe (2014)
- Ajoba (2014)
- Ship of Theseus (2013)
- 24 (TV series)
- London, Paris, New York (2012)
- Venalodungathe
- I.D. (2012)
- Peddlers (2012)
- The Reluctant Fundamentalist (2012)
- Miss Lovely (2012)
- Travelling with the Pros (2012 - Sports documentary)
- The Greatest Love Story Ever Told (Documentary, 2011)
- Khichdi: The Movie (2010)

== Awards ==
Awards
Year	Name of Award	Name of Film	Language	Awardee(s)
2014	National Film Awards Silver Lotus Award (Rajat Kamal) for Best Audiography (Sound Designer)	Asha Jaoar Majhe	Bengali	Anish John
2015	Jagran Film Festival Award for Best Sound Design (Recordist)	Asha Jaoar Majhe	Bengali	Anish John
2017	Film Fare Award for Best Sound Design Award	Trapped	Hindi	Anish John
2017	Jagran Film Festival Award for Best Sound Design (Recordist)	Trapped	Hindi	Anish John
2018	News 18 Reel Movie Awards for Best Sound Design Award	Trapped	Hindi	Anish John
