= Chhalaang =

2020 Indian film by Hansal Mehta

- Release poster
- Directed by: Hansal Mehta
- Written by: Luv Ranjan; Aseem Arrora; Zeishan Quadri
- Produced by: Ajay Devgn; Luv Ranjan
- Starring: Rajkummar Rao; Nushrat Bharucha; Mohammed Zeeshan Ayyub; Saurabh Shukla
- Cinematography: Eeshit Narain
- Edited by: Akiv Ali; Chetan Solanki
- Music by: Score: Hitesh Sonik; Songs: Hitesh Sonik; Guru Randhawa–Vee; Yo Yo Honey Singh; Vishal–Shekhar
- Production companies: T-Series Films; Luv Films; Ajay Devgn FFilms
- Distributed by: Amazon Prime Video
- Release date: 13 November 2020
- Running time: 136 minutes
- Country: India
- Language: Hindi

Chhalaang (transl. Leap) is a 2020 Indian Hindi-language sports comedy drama film directed by Hansal Mehta. It is produced by Ajay Devgn, Luv Ranjan, and Ankur Garg, and presented by Bhushan Kumar. Chhalaang stars Rajkummar Rao, Nushrat Bharucha and Mohammed Zeeshan Ayyub.

Principal photography commenced in last quarter of 2018. Initially named Turram Khan, Chhalaang was wrapped up in August 2019. Initially scheduled for a theatrical premiere, it was directly released online on Amazon Prime Video on 13 November 2020, coinciding with Diwali.

== Plot ==
Mahender Singh Hooda aka Montu is a lazy, uninspired, and unprofessional physical training instructor (PTI) at a school in Jhajjar, Haryana, a job he got as courtesy of his father Kamlesh Singh Hooda's influence as a lawyer. He lives with his parents and his brother and spends most of his time hanging out and messing around with his teacher-buddy, Mr. Shukla. When Neelima Mehra arrives in Montu's school as a new computer teacher, Montu finds himself falling in love with her, and the two start to grow very close when she tells her nickname Neelu.

To his surprise, Montu finds out that the school hired a new PTI, Inder Mohan Singh, as the government required PTIs to have a physical education degree, which Montu didn't have. Begrudgingly, Montu accepts a role as Singh's assistant. Montu quickly realizes that Inder Mohan is a much better PT teacher than him, and gets even more irked when Neelu starts spending more time with Inder Mohan. One day, Singh keeps Montu's brother, Bablu, pinned to the ground as a punishment for not paying attention. This leads to a fight between Montu and Singh, after which Montu quits his job at the school.

Montu soon realizes that he cannot quit his job, and returns to the school to challenge Inder Mohan with a three sport competition: basketball, a 400m relay race, and kabaddi. Montu and Inder Mohan would coach the two separate groups of students participating. Whoever's team won the competition would stay as the PT teacher, while the other would have to leave, and Inder Mohan accepts the challenge. Montu foolishly lets Singh choose his team first in an attempt to impress Neelu by showing her his humility, and it backfires on him when he is left with a significantly weaker team.

As Montu starts to lose hope, Neelu comes to his side and helps him coach his team. She advises him to choose several girls for his team, which he does. Then, she helps him implement very unorthodox training regimes, such as running from guard dogs to increase speed, catching loose chickens to increase agility, and dribbling a basketball through a cow dung minefield to increase dribbling ability. Their efforts pay off, however, the children's parents start to revolt, saying that the competition is dragging their children's focus away from studies. Montu's father with the help of Neelu manage to get them back on board by using blackmail and threatening to re-open existing legal cases against them.

At the competition, Singh's team barely beat Montu's team in basketball, but Montu's team wins the competition with close victories in the 400m relay race and kabaddi. Inder Mohan accepts his defeat and congratulates Montu. Since, he realises that Singh is a much better coach than him, Montu proposes the idea of working together with Singh, as he has to learn a lot from him. Montu thanks the students and their parents for their trust and dedication. He then declares his love for Neelu, and she accepts his love proposal.

== Cast ==
=== Main ===
- Rajkummar Rao as Mahender "Montu" Singh Hooda, a Physical Training Instructor "PT Teacher" (later becomes Neelu's husband)
- Nushrat Bharucha as Neelima "Neelu" Hooda (née Mehra), a computer teacher in the same school where Montu works (later becomes Montu's wife)
- Mohammed Zeeshan Ayyub as Inder Mohan Singh, senior PTI in Montu's school
- Saurabh Shukla as Mr. Shukla, a former Hindi teacher and former principal of Montu's school

=== Recurring ===
- Ila Arun as Usha Gehlot, the principal of Montu's school
- Satish Kaushik as Kamlesh Singh Hooda, a retired lawyer and Montu's father
- Jatin Sarna as Dimpy, Montu's friend and a halwai in a small snacks shop
- Naman Jain as Babloo Singh Hooda, Montu's younger brother and student of Singh Sir
- Garima Kaur as Pinky Yadav
- Baljinder Kaur as Kamla Singh Hooda, Montu's mother
- Suparna Marwah as Sakshi S. Mehra, Neelu's mother
- Rajiv Gupta as Sanjay Mehra, Neelu's father

== Production ==
Hansal Mehta announced the film on 10 August 2018 with the title "Turram Khan" and Rajkummar Rao and Nushrat Bharucha in the lead roles. In 2019, Mohammed Zeeshan Ayyub joined the film to portray a supporting role.

Principal photography for the film began in late-2018. In June 2019, Rao and Mehta, along with Ayyub, were spotted filming a kabaddi scene in Mumbai's Film City.

In December 2019, the title of the film was changed to "Chhalaang", which means "Jump".

== Release ==
Initially planned for release on 31 January 2020, it was announced on 26 December 2019 that the film has been postponed to 13 March 2020. It was further scheduled to 12 June 2020. Due to the COVID-19 pandemic, the film was again postponed. Finally it was released on 13 November 2020 on Amazon Prime Video coinciding with Diwali.

== Soundtrack ==
Chhalaang

Soundtrack album by Hitesh Sonik, Guru Randhawa–Vee, Yo Yo Honey Singh and Vishal–Shekhar
- Released: 13 November 2020
- Recorded: 2019
- Genre: Feature film soundtrack
- Length: 12:40
- Language: Hindi
- Label: T-Series

Official audio
- Chhalaang - Full Album on YouTube

The film's music was composed by Hitesh Sonik, Guru Randhawa–Vee, Yo Yo Honey Singh and Vishal–Shekhar while lyrics written by Luv Ranjan, Guru Randhawa, Yo Yo Honey Singh, Alfaaz, Hommie Dilliwala and Panchhi Jalonvi.

The song "Deedar De" is a recreation of "Deedar De" from the film Dus by Vishal–Shekhar. People online criticized Vishal–Shekhar for recreating their song, but the duo clarified that they did not recreate the song, they were credited because they composed the original.

Track listing
No.	Title	Lyrics	Music	Singer(s)	Length
1.	"Care Ni Karda"	Alfaaz, Yo Yo Honey Singh, Hommie Dilliwala	Yo Yo Honey Singh	Sweetaj Brar, Yo Yo Honey Singh	3:12
2.	"Teri Choriyaan"	Luv Ranjan, Guru Randhawa	Guru Randhawa–Vee	Guru Randhawa, Payal Dev	2:55
3.	"Le Chhalaang"	Luv Ranjan	Hitesh Sonik	Daler Mehndi	3:29
4.	"Deedar De"	Panchhi Jalonvi	Vishal–Shekhar	Asees Kaur, Dev Negi	3:04
Total length:					12:40

== Reception ==
On the review aggregator website Rotten Tomatoes, 69% of 13 critics' reviews are positive, with an average rating of 5.8/10. Mike McCahill of The Guardian gave the film three out of 5, writing, "Drama specialist Mehta (2012’s Shahid) brings to this a professionalism you could easily underrate. Handled carelessly, fluff like this often unravels into nonsense, but Chhalaang feels faintly precious for landing intact near the end of a heavy year."

Anupama Chopra of Film Companion gave a negative review, writing, "Chhalaang isn’t tear-your-hair-out awful. It’s just ordinary." Saibal Chatterjee of NDTV gave the film two out of five, writing, "Chhalaang, unable to fend off its contradictions, gets all tangled up in its own mixed messages. As a result, the promised leap never materialises."
