= Baljinder Kaur =

Indian actress

- Born: Bhondian, Bhogpur, India
- Occupation: Actress
- Years active: 1991-present

Baljinder Kaur is an Indian actress who has appeared in Haryanvi, Hindi and Tamil films.

== Career ==
Kaur was born and brought up in the village of Bhondian near Bhogpur, Punjab. She developed an interest in theatre during her education at DAV College, Hoshiarpur and in 1994, chose to study a degree in drama over education at Punjab University. After graduating, she started teaching drama at a school in Hisar, Haryana and later married Brijesh Sharma in 2000, who was her classmate at university and during another stint at the National School of Drama. During her time at drama school, she learnt various forms of classical dance and music and later worked for six years as a member of the repertory.

Kaur made her acting debut as a film actress through the critically acclaimed Hindi film, Shahid (2013), after being approached by the casting director, Mukesh Chabra, who had see one of Kaur's stage performances. She won critical acclaim for her role in the project and was subsequently approached to play roles in two of Aamir Khan's films, PK (2014) and Dangal (2016), but turned down the opportunities indicating her reluctance to work on glamorous roles. In 2014, she worked on the Haryanvi film Pagdi: The Honour directed by Rajiv Bhatia, whom she knew from her time at the School of Drama. Her husband, Brijesh Sharma, also portrayed a role in the film as the heroine's father. For her performance in the film, she received the National Film Award for Best Supporting Actress and was also subsequently recognised by Punjab University for her work. She was then subsequently seen as a Mardwari woman from the slums of Chennai in Sudha Kongara Prasad's bilingual film, Saala Khadoos. For her part in the Tamil version, she memorised her dialogues after translating the script phonetically into English.

== Filmography ==
Year	Film	Role	Language	Notes
2013	Shahid	Ammi	Hindi	
2013	Commando	Preethi	Hindi	
2014	Pagdi: The Honour		Haryanvi	National Film Award for Best Supporting Actress
2016	Irudhi Suttru	Damayanthi	Tamil	
2016	Saala Khadoos	Damayanthi	Hindi	
2018	Sajjan Singh Rangroot		Punjabi	
2018	Qismat		Punjabi	
2018	Chamm		Punjabi	
2019	S.P. Chauhan		Hindi	
2019	Rabb Da Radio 2		Punjabi	
2019	Surkhi Bindi		Punjabi	
2020	Chhalaang		Hindi	
2020	Chal Mera Putt 2		Punjabi	
2020	Raat Akeli Hai		Hindi	
2021	Chal Mera Putt 3		Punjabi	
2021	Seep		Punjabi	
2021	Warning		Punjabi	
2021	Thana Sadar		Punjabi	
2022	Shava Ni Girdhari Lal		Punjabi	
2022	Shikari		Punjabi	
2022	Badhaai Do		Hindi	
2022	Aaja Mexico Challiye		Punjabi	
2022	Cheta Singh		Punjabi	
2022	Babbar		Punjabi	
2022	Kokka		Punjabi	
2022	Khaao Piyo Aish Karo		Punjabi	
2022	Lover		Punjabi	
2022	Sohreyan Da Pind Aa Gaya		Punjabi	
2022	Challa Mud Ke Ni Aya		Punjabi	
2022	Ziddi Jatt		Punjabi	
2023	Dear Jassi	Sukhdev Kaur	Punjabi	
2025	Maalik		Hindi	
