= Rajkummar Rao =

Indian actor (born 1984)

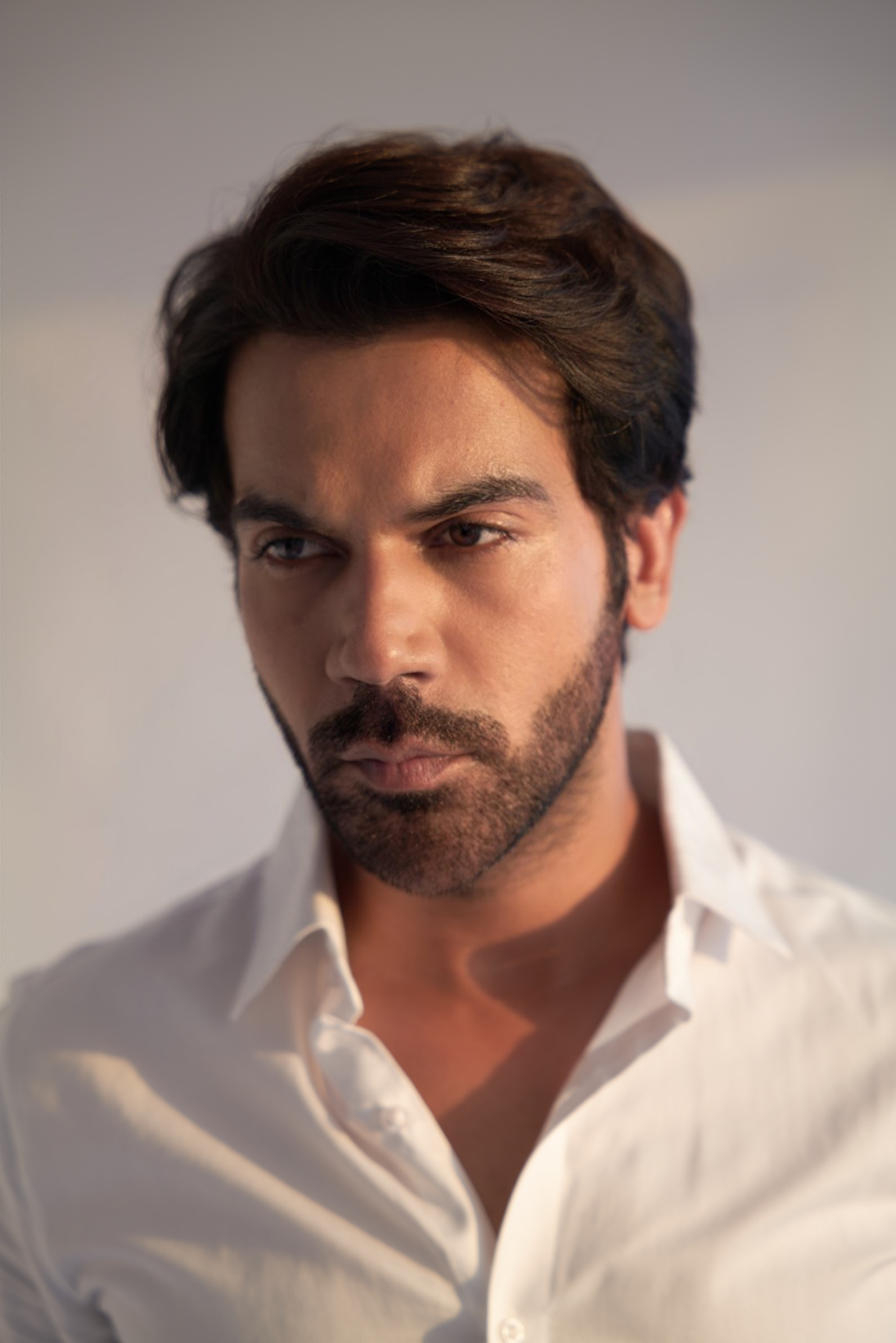
- Rao in 2023
- Born: Raj Kumar Yadav; 31 August 1984 (age 42); Gurgaon, Haryana, India
- Education: Film and Television Institute of India
- Occupation: Actor
- Years active: 2010–present
- Works: Full list
- Spouse: Patralekha (m. 2021)
- Children: 1
- Awards: Full list

Rajkummar Rao (born Raj Kumar Yadav; 31 August 1984) is an Indian actor. Known for his work across a wide spectrum of genres, he has starred in over thirty films in Hindi cinema, spanning both independent and commercial films. He is the recipient of several accolades, including a National Film Award, five Filmfare Awards, and an Asia Pacific Screen Award. In 2017, he was featured on Forbes India's Celebrity 100 list.

After training at the Film and Television Institute of India, Rao made his film debut in the anthology Love Sex Aur Dhokha (2010), followed by supporting roles in Gangs of Wasseypur – Part 2 and Talaash: The Answer Lies Within (both 2012). He achieved his breakthrough in 2013 with acclaimed performances in the dramas Kai Po Che! and Shahid. His portrayal of lawyer Shahid Azmi in the latter earned him the National Film Award for Best Actor and the Filmfare Critics Award for Best Actor.

Rao gained further recognition with roles in Queen (2014), Aligarh (2015), and Bareilly Ki Barfi (2017), with the last winning him the Filmfare Award for Best Supporting Actor. He then starred in independent films such as Trapped (2016) and Newton (2017), earning critical acclaim and recognition, including the Asia Pacific Screen Award for Best Performance by an Actor. His commercial breakthrough came with the comedy horror Stree (2018). He continued to earn praise for starring roles in Ludo (2020), Monica, O My Darling (2022) and Srikanth (2024). He won the Filmfare Award for Best Actor for portraying a closeted gay man in Badhaai Do (2022). Despite subsequent commercial setbacks, Rao regained success with the sequel Stree 2 (2024) and the fantasy film Bhool Chuk Maaf (2025). While the former ranks as his highest-grossing release, he faced criticism for repeatedly taking on similar roles.

== Early life and education ==
Rajkummar Rao was born as Raj Kumar Yadav on 31 August 1984 in Prem Nagar, Gurgaon, Haryana, India. He had two older siblings and three cousins in his extended family. His father, Satya Prakash Yadav, was a government employee in the Haryana revenue department, and his mother, Kamlesh Yadav, a homemaker. His mother and father died in 2016 and 2019 respectively. He completed his 12th standard from S.N. Sidheshwar Senior. Sec Public School, where he participated in school plays. He graduated from The Atma Ram Sanatan Dharma College, (University of Delhi) where he was simultaneously doing theatre with Kshitij Theatre Group and the Shri Ram Centre in Delhi.

Rao said that he decided to become an actor after seeing Manoj Bajpayee and being "highly influenced" by his performance. In 2008, he graduated in the acting course at the Film and Television Institute of India (FTII), Pune, and moved to Mumbai to pursue a film career.

== Career ==
=== Early work (2010–2012) ===
After graduating from the FTII in 2008, Rao spent the next year visiting studios and meeting casting directors. He made a brief, uncredited appearance as a news reader in Ram Gopal Varma's 2010 political thriller Rann. Upon reading a newspaper advertisement that mentioned Dibakar Banerjee was looking for newcomers for his found footage anthology film Love Sex Aur Dhokha (2010), he auditioned for the film and was selected. The film consists of three stories; Rao appears in the second story opposite Neha Chauhan. He played Adarsh, a supermarket supervisor who cons an employee into sleeping with him so he can record the act on a hidden camera and sell it. To prepare for the role, he had to lose 6 kilograms (13 lb) in a month. The film and Rao's performance met with critical acclaim. It also emerged as a profitable box-office venture.

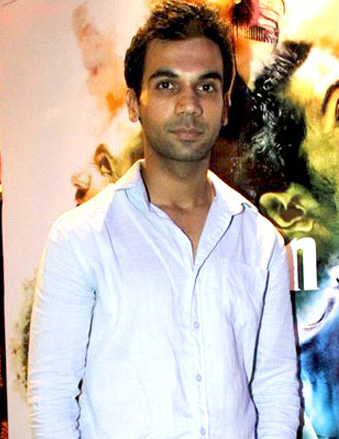
Rao at the music launch of Shaitan in 2011

After the success of his debut film, producer Ekta Kapoor offered Rao the lead role in the found-footage horror film Ragini MMS (2011). Initially reluctant to accept the role due to its similarity to his previous work, he eventually agreed at the insistence of casting director Atul Mongia. Despite its unfavorable critical response, the film was a box-office success. His next release was Bejoy Nambiar's crime thriller Shaitan (2011), in which he played a corrupt police officer. Raja Sen, who was critical of the film, praised Rao's performance, describing him as "reliably terrific".

Impressed by Rao's performance in Love Sex Aur Dhokha, Anurag Kashyap cast him in Gangs of Wasseypur – Part 2 (2012), the sequel to his crime drama Gangs of Wasseypur – Part 1. He played the supporting role of Shamshad Alam for which he travelled to Wasseypur to perfect his accent and immerse himself in the character. The film was a critical and commercial success. His subsequent role was that of independence activist Lokenath Bal in Bedabrata Pain's historical drama Chittagong (2012), which was based on the Chittagong armoury raid. His final release of the year was in a supporting role in Reema Kagti's thriller Talaash: The Answer Lies Within, where he played a cop. The film, starring Aamir Khan and Rani Mukerji, had worldwide earnings of over ₹1.74 billion (US$24 million) to emerge as the year's eighth highest-grossing Hindi film—Rao's highest-grosser to that point. Rajeev Masand was appreciative of Rao's performance despite his short appearance.

Rao followed this with the Hansal Mehta-directed biographical drama Shahid, where he plays the title role of late lawyer Shahid Azmi. To prepare for the role, Rao met with Azmi's family to accurately emulate his personality. He also studied the Quran and attended court proceedings to better understand the behaviours of lawyers whilst in court. Rao expressed that he was "emotionally drained" as the character was challenging and complex. The film and his performance met with critical acclaim upon its release. Anupama Chopra called the film Rao's "triumph"; "His Shahid has strength, anguish and a controlled anger, but also real charm". The film was also a major box-office success; Rao received the National Film Award for Best Actor and his first Filmfare Award for Best Actor (Critics).

=== Breakthrough (2013–2016) ===
Abhishek Kapoor's social drama film Kai Po Che! was Rao's first venture in 2013, a role he believed showcased a different facet of his acting abilities. Co-starring Sushant Singh Rajput and Amit Sadh, the film is based on Chetan Bhagat's 2008 novel The 3 Mistakes of My Life. The film received widespread critical acclaim, with particular praise towards the lead performances. Shilpa Jamkhandikar of Deccan Herald felt that Rao stood out and played off the role "beautifully". He received his first nomination for the Filmfare Award for Best Supporting Actor. Rao has since credited the success of both Shahid and Kai Po Che! with giving him access to a wider variety of roles. His final release of the year was the unremarkable anthology comedy film Boyss Toh Boyss Hain.

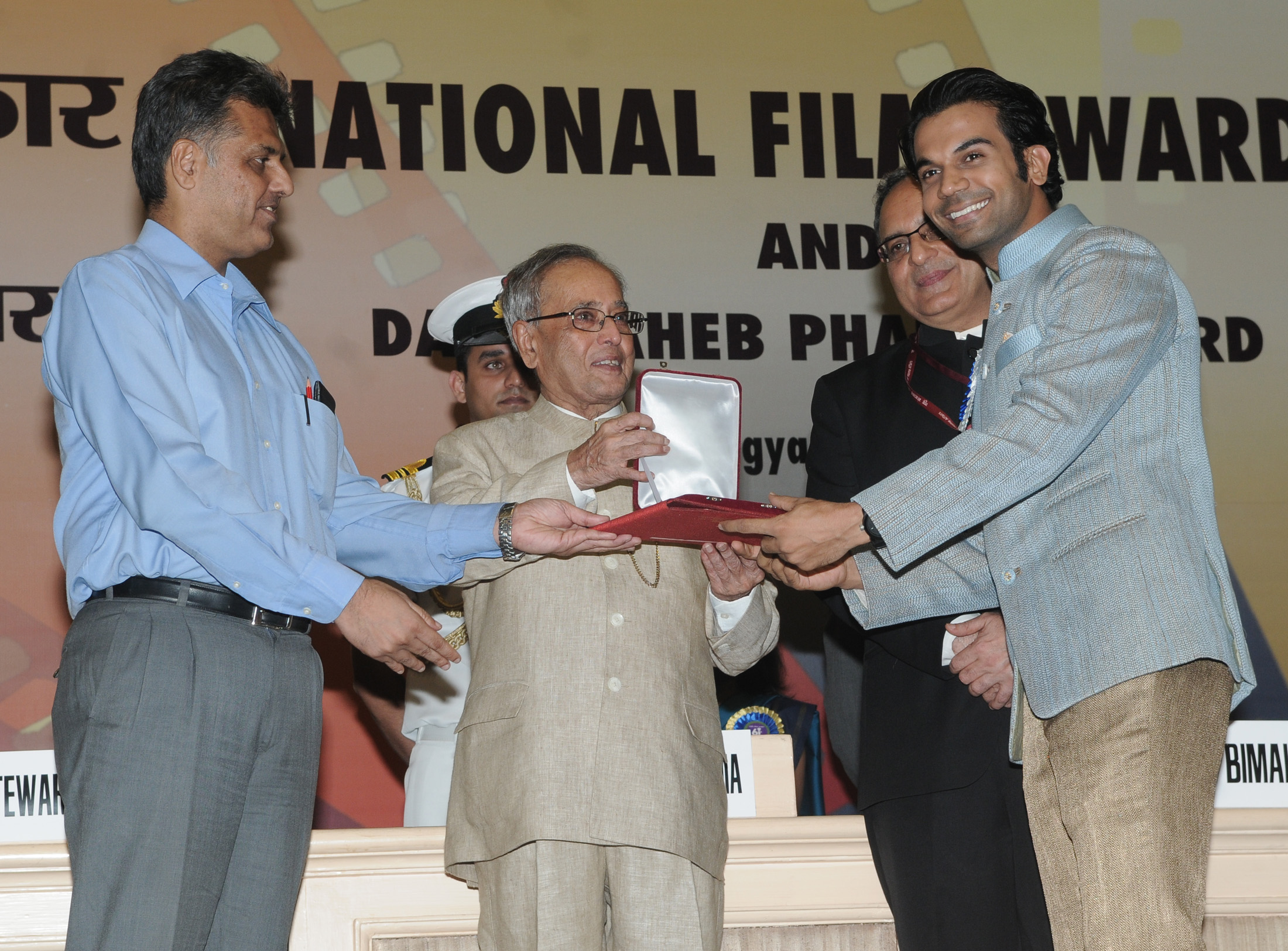
Rao winning the National Film Award for Best Actor for his performance in Shahid in 2014

The same year, he acted in a short film titled Bombay Mirror directed by Shlok Sharma along with Vijay Maurya. He then collaborated with Mehta on his drama film CityLights (2014). Co-starring his wife Patralekha, the film tells the story of a poor farm family from Rajasthan that comes to Mumbai in search of a livelihood. To prepare for the role, Rao lived in the small town of Sadri in the Pali district of Rajasthan for a month, grew a moustache and became well-versed with the dialect. Critics praised the film and Rao's performance. Sweta Kaushal of Hindustan Times wrote that he slips "effortlessly" into the role. It proved to be a moderate financial success. He then played a brief supporting role as a manipulative fiancé in Kangana Ranaut's comedy-drama Queen. The film had its world premiere at the Busan International Film Festival and was a critical and commercial success, grossing ₹970 million (US$14 million) worldwide. Saibal Chatterjee of NDTV noted that Rao "brings remarkable restraint to bear upon his interpretation of the disgustingly conservative city slicker who cannot see beyond his nose".

In 2015, Rao appeared in a supporting role in the romantic comedy Dolly Ki Doli, co-starring Sonam K Ahuja, Pulkit Samrat and Varun Sharma. It met with mixed reviews and emerged as a modest commercial success at the box-office. He followed this the Mohit Suri-directed romantic drama Hamari Adhuri Kahani (2015), in which he played an abusive husband who leaves his wife (played by Vidya Balan). He then reunited with Mehta once again in his biographical drama Aligarh. Based on the life of Professor Ramchandra Siras (played by Manoj Bajpayee), Rao portrayed a journalist who attempts to uncover a story. Aligarh met with critical acclaim upon its release, with particular praise for Bajpayee and Rao's performances. Sukanya Verma called Rao "pitch-perfect" in his role of "inquisitive journalist". Rao received his second nomination for the Filmfare Award for Best Supporting Actor.

Rao collaborated with Vikramaditya Motwane for his survival drama Trapped (2016). It tells the story of a man trapped in his apartment without food, water and electricity for days. Rao found the role to be one of his most challenging to date. In preparation for the film, he had to lose weight and—to maintain it—remained on a carrot and coffee diet throughout the course of filming. Despite being a vegan, Rao ate meat in some scenes for the first time in his life, as Motwane insisted on realism. Trapped premiere at the 2016 Mumbai Film Festival and was released theatrically the following year to positive reviews from critics. Subhash K. Jha wrote that Rao "immerses himself in the judiciously assembled plot with such radiant authenticity that after a while we cease to watch the skill that underlines the outstanding performance". He earned his second Filmfare Award for Best Actor (Critics).

=== Commercial success (2017–2018) ===
Rao's first release in 2017 was the romantic comedy Behen Hogi Teri with Shruti Haasan; it met with an unfavourable critical response though critics praised Rao's performance. He followed this with another romantic comedy titled Bareilly Ki Barfi, directed by Ashwiny Iyer Tiwari and co-starring Kriti Sanon and Ayushmann Khurrana. The film and Rao's performance met with widespread critical acclaim. Namrata Joshi wrote: "Rao is a hoot and brings the house down with his chameleon turn and comic timing [the] a role that could have become a caricature in the hands of a lesser actor". The film was a commercial success and Rao won his first Filmfare Award for Best Supporting Actor. Rao also made a cameo appearance in Dinesh Vijan's Raabta in which he had to apply prosthetics for multiple hours daily during shooting to appear as a 324-year-old man.

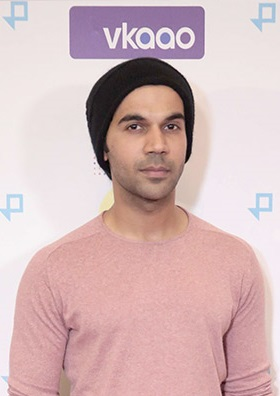
Rao at the Mumbai Film Festival in 2017

A significant turning point in Rao's career came in Amit V. Masurkar's black comedy Newton in which he plays an upright government clerk sent on election duty to a Naxal-controlled town. Rao asked Masurkar if he could curl his hair and blink his eyes frequently during filming to make the character more distinct, and Masurkar agreed. The film premiered at the 67th Berlin International Film Festival and was met with unanimous critical acclaim, as did Rao's performance. Rajeev Masand commented, "It's hard to separate the actor from the character, and not many of our artistes can claim to possess that gift". The role earned him the Asia Pacific Screen Award for Best Actor and his third nomination for the Filmfare Award for Best Actor (Critics).

His final theatrical release of the year was Shaadi Mein Zaroor Aana with Kriti Kharbanda, which met with mixed critical response. He also made his digital debut with ALTBalaji's historical biographical web mini-series Bose: Dead/Alive. Based on the 2012 book India's Biggest Cover-up by Anuj Dhar, he portrays nationalist leader Subhash Chandra Bose. For the role, Rao gained 13 kilograms (29 lb) and went half bald. Anvita Singh of India Today felt it was not Rao's best performance, but because of his skill as an actor he "does grab your attention".

Rao reunited with Mehta for the biographical crime film Omerta, where he portrays the role of terrorist Ahmed Omar Saeed Sheikh. To prepare for the role, Rao watched several videos, documentaries and hate speeches by Sheikh to "gather a lot of hatred and anger" inside himself. He said he was "disturbed" while shooting the film because of the complexities of the character and described it as "easily the toughest character" he had played to this point. The film had its world premiere at the 2017 Toronto International Film Festival and was released in India in 2018. The film and Rao's performance met with critical acclaim, with Saibal Chatterjee of NDTV calling it a "pitch-perfect performance".

He starred next in the musical comedy Fanney Khan (2018) with Aishwarya Rai Bachchan and Anil Kapoor. A remake of the 2000 Belgian film Everybody's Famous!, the film was a critical and commercial failure. Stree (2018), the Amar Kaushik-directed horror comedy was his next release. Based on the Bangalore urban legend known as Nale Ba, the film also starred Shraddha Kapoor. The film, and Rao's performance, met with positive critical feedback. Rachit Gupta of The Times of India noted that Rao "handles the many shades of comedy, horror and romance with great ease". It also earned him his first nomination for the Filmfare Award for Best Actor. Stree was a major financial success. In the same year Rao appeared briefly in Tabrez Noorani's Love Sonia which was about sex trafficking. His final release of 2018 was 5 Weddings.

=== Commercial failure with continued acclaim (2019–2023) ===
Ek Ladki Ko Dekha Toh Aisa Laga, a film about a closeted lesbian, was Rao's first release of 2019. Co-starring Sonam K Ahuja, Anil Kapoor and Juhi Chawla, the film received mixed critical responses but was widely praised for its positive mainstream representation of homosexuality. However, the film underperformed commercially. He then appeared alongside Kangana Ranaut in the black comedy Judgementall Hai Kya. His performance earned him his fourth nomination for the Filmfare Award for Best Actor (Critics). His final acting venture of the year was Mikhil Musale's comedy Made in China, in which he played a Gujarati businessman tasked with marketing a Chinese aphrodisiac in India. Based on the novel by Parinda Joshi, the film received mixed reviews. Anna M. M. Vetticad noted that while the film had its flaws, "the best thing about it are Rao and [Boman] Irani who are a pleasure to watch even in this middling affair". The film performed moderately at the box office.

Rao's first release of 2020 was Ramesh Sippy's romantic comedy Shimla Mirchi, which had been delayed for several years. It received negative reviews and was a box office failure. He next appeared in the Anurag Basu-directed anthology film Ludo, featuring an ensemble cast including Abhishek Bachchan, Aditya Roy Kapur, Sanya Malhotra, Fatima Sana Shaikh and Pankaj Tripathi. The film was released directly on Netflix due to the COVID-19 pandemic. Anupama Chopra highlighted him as one of the film's "standouts". The film earned him his second nomination for the Filmfare Award for Best Actor and his fifth nomination for the Filmfare Award for Best Actor (Critics). In the same year, he reunited with Mehta for the sports comedy Chhalaang, portraying a Haryanvi physical instructor opposite Nushrratt Bharuccha. It premiered on Amazon Prime Video.

In 2021, Rao made his Hollywood debut with Ramin Bahrani's The White Tiger, which was based on the eponymous novel by Aravind Adiga. Co-starring Priyanka Chopra and Adarsh Gourav, it was released directly on to Netflix and was met with critical acclaim. David Rooney from The Hollywood Reporter noted that Rao "deftly balances a Western-schooled urge to tell himself he's a fair-minded man with the unmistakable air of privileged entitlement". He continued his collaborations with Maddock Productions for their horror-comedy Roohi co-starring Janhvi Kapoor. The film received mixed critical feedback and emerged as another box-office failure for Rao which was attributed to theatres being closed due to the COVID-19 pandemic. He next starred in Abhishek Jain's family drama Hum Do Hamare Do, in which he portrayed an orphan who deceives his fiancée (played by Sanon) by hiring people to pose as his parents. Initially slated for a theatrical release, the decision was later dropped due to the second wave of the COVID-19 pandemic in India. The film was panned by critics with Saibal Chatterjee of NDTV commending Rao on salvaging a "poorly-written protagonist".

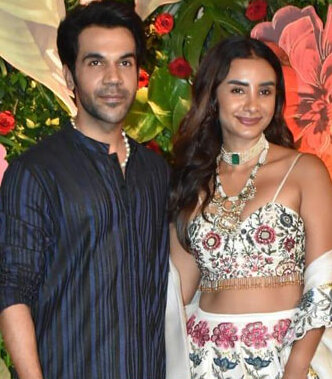
Rao with his wife and co-actor Patralekha in 2022

In 2022, Rao starred opposite Bhumi Pednekar in Harshavardhan Kulkarni's Badhaai Do, in which they portrayed a couple in a lavender marriage to prevent their parents from pressuring them into traditional marriages. He was drawn to the role of a gay police officer due to the unique challenge it offered and, to prepare, he underwent an extensive diet and exercise regimen to achieve the physical appearance Kulkarni envisioned for the character. The film, and Rao's performance, earned unanimous critical acclaim with The Quint's Stutee Ghosh particularly taking note of "his vacant impassive expression that makes you realise how stifled he feels in a police uniform". His performance was featured in several publications' lists of the best Hindi cinema performances of the year. He also earned his first Best Actor award at Filmfare.

Rao followed this with the thriller film HIT: The First Case, a remake of the 2020 Telugu film of the same name. Co-starring Sanya Malhotra, Rao, once again, portrayed a police officer who works in the Homicide Intervention Team (HIT). Critics generally considered the film inferior to the original but appreciated Rao's performance; Devesh Sharma of Filmfare praised him for ensuring that a weak script did not hinder his performance and praised his chemistry with Malhotra. Both Badhaai Do and HIT: The First Case were commercial failures. After making a brief cameo appearance reprising his role from Stree in Bhediya, Rao starred alongside Radhika Apte and Huma Qureshi in Vasan Bala's Monica, O My Darling. Released directly on to Netflix, he expressed his indifference toward the film receiving commercial success and that his primary hope was for the film's content to be appreciated. Rao's performance was praised by Anna MM Vetticad of Firstpost who took note of his ability to distinguish his roles as police officers without becoming monotonous.

Bheed—a social thriller in black-and-white about the events that transpired during the COVID-19 lockdown in India—was Rao's sole theatrical release of 2023. The film received positive critical acclaim; however, its box-office performance was limited due to its controversial political themes. Rao's consistent portrayal of "troubled police officers" earned praise from Deepa Gahlot of Rediff.com. He followed this by portraying a mechanic who is the reluctant heir to his father's criminal empire in Netflix's Guns & Gulaabs, reteaming with Raj & DK after Stree. Set against the backdrop of the 1990s in the fictitious town of Gulaabgani, Rao assists a police officer (played by Dulquer Salmaan) in bringing down a high-profile opium deal. Writing for The Hindu, Shilajit Misra found Rao's portrayal of the character to be reminiscent of actor Charlie Chaplain.

=== Commercial resurgence (2024-present) ===
Rao had four releases in 2024 and began by portraying visually-impaired industrialist Srikanth Bolla in his biopic Srikanth. To authentically capture the mannerisms of the visually-impaired, Rao spent time at schools for the blind and engaged in conversations with the students. He also analysed videos of Bolla to accurately emulate his body language. Srikanth marked an end to Rao's series of commercial failures and earned positive critical reception. Reviewers for Firstpost and Scroll.in deemed his performance among the best in his career, earning him another Best Actor (Critics) award at Filmfare. In the unremarkable sports drama Mr. & Mrs. Mahi, Rao portrayed a failed cricket player who vicariously fulfils his aspirations to pursue the sport through his wife (played by Janhvi Kapoor). Despite disliking the film, Shilajit Mitra opined that Rao "effectively sells the frustration and peevishness of a dunce like Mahendra".

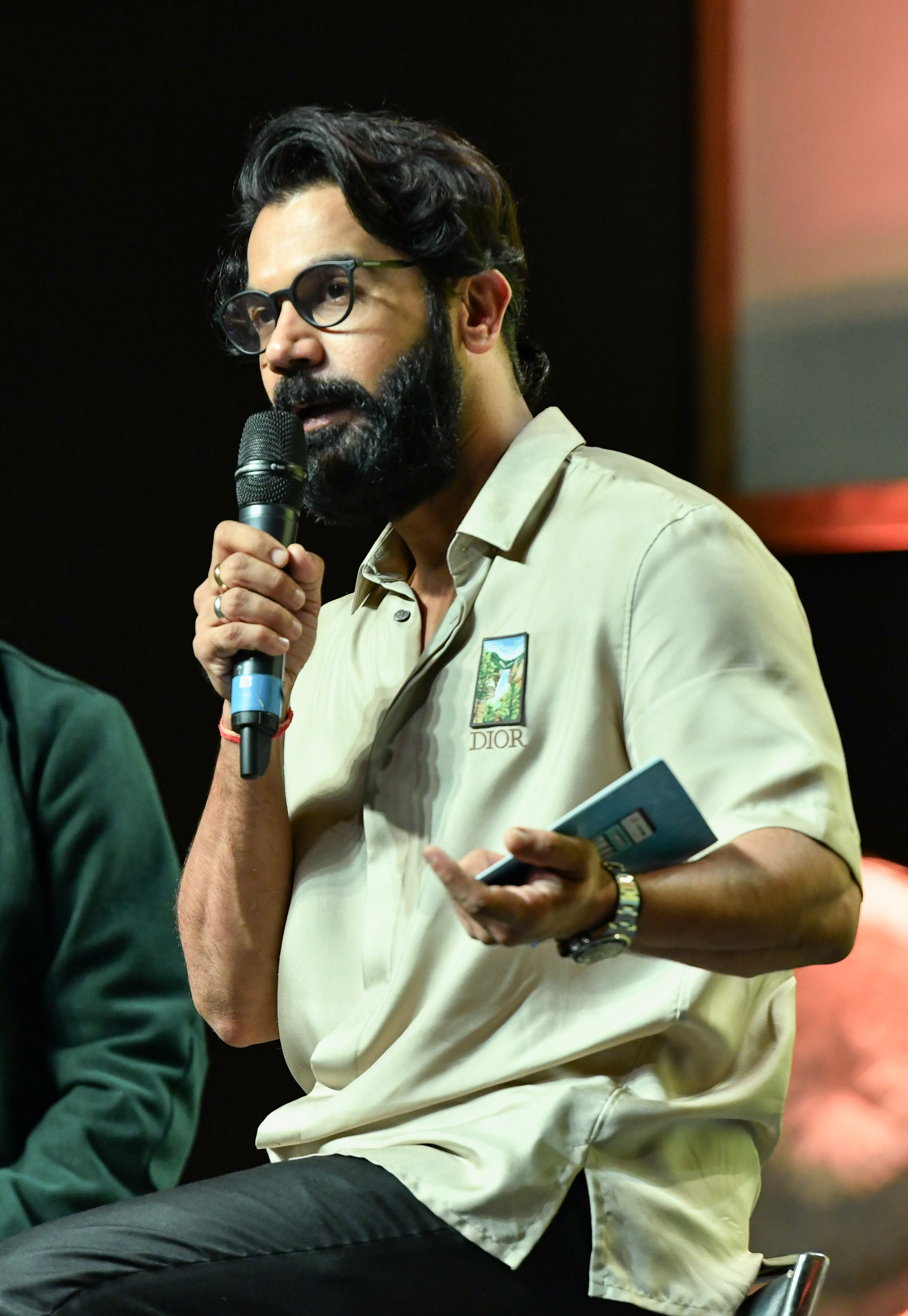
Rao in 2024

The highest-grossing film of Rao's career came in the horror sequel Stree 2, in which he reprised his role as Vicky. He admitted that the film's substantial success gave his confidence a "much-needed" lift following a series of commercial failures. While acknowledging his comic timing, WION's Shomini Sen felt that Rao had been overshadowed by the performances of the supporting cast, but The Times of India's Abhishek Srivastava thought that he was in "top-form". Stree 2 emerged as the highest-grossing Hindi film of 2024 as well as the seventh highest-grossing Hindi film of all time, with a worldwide gross of over ₹8.75 billion (US$91 million). For his performance, he was nominated for the Best Actor award at Filmfare. In Vicky Vidya Ka Woh Wala Video, Rao and Triptii Dimri played newlyweds in 1997 searching for their missing sex tape. Citing it as one of his rare weak performances in a negative review of the film, Hindustan Times' Rishabh Suri believed that Rao had been constrained by poor-writing, though he appreciated his comic timing. Mint's Udita Jhunjhunwala analysed that the actor had begun to be typecast as "the small-town boy facing a harrowing situation". Both Mr. & Mrs. Mahi and Vicky Vidya Ka Woh Wala Video underperformed commercially.

In the fantasy film Bhool Chuk Maaf (2025), Rao played a man stuck in a time loop on his wedding day. The film faced several delays in its release due to the 2025 India–Pakistan conflict and problems between distributors. While dismissing the film and its writing, Sukanya Verma of Rediff.com lamented Rao's recurring career choices, dubbing him the "perennially exasperated small-town lad grappling with a rom-com crisis". Against expectations, Bhool Chul Maaf emerged as a successful financial venture. Initially dissuaded from pursuing an action film due to the lack of compelling scripts, Rao was eventually drawn to Maalik, feeling it offered far more than conventional action. To prepare for his role as the eponymous gangster, he underwent a physical transformation that required him to build muscle and grow out both his hair and beard. In a mixed review for The Hollywood Reporter India, Rahul Desai commended Rao as a "shapeless actor [who] manages to infuse details into the character that the writing cannot". It emerged as a box-office bomb.

The following year, Rao starred again as a small-town boy in the comedy Toaster (2026) for Netflix, which he also produced. Commenting on his career trajectory, Shreyas Pande of The Hindu observed that the actor once portrayed "familiar, everyday faces that were often ignored amidst the noise", but has since diversified his oeuvre into more mainstream roles, where he is no longer as revelatory and instead "just has a bunch of jokes up his sleeves". Rao will next star in the biopics Prahaar: The Untold Story of Ujjwal Nikam and DADA: The Sourav Ganguly Story.

== Personal life ==
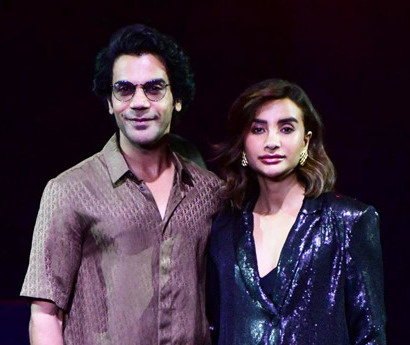
Rao and Patralekha in 2024

Born into a Hindu family, Rao has stated that he also identifies with Sikhism, Christianity and Islam. Rao is a vegetarian. He changed his surname to Rao from Yadav in 2014 and also added an extra 'm' to his name. He said the reason for this was, "Rao or Yadav, I can use either of the surnames as both are family names. As far as the double 'm' in the first name is concerned, it's for my mother. She believes in numerology". He is formally trained in taekwondo.

Rao began dating actress Patralekha in 2010. They married on 15 November 2021 in Chandigarh. The couple welcomed their first child, daughter, on their fourth wedding anniversary i.e., 15 November 2025.

== Public image ==
Forbes India featured Rao in their 30 Under 30 list of 2014. People for the Ethical Treatment of Animals (PETA) listed him as India's Hottest Vegetarian Celebrity in 2017. The same year, he appeared on Forbes India's Celebrity 100 list and GQ magazine's list of 50 Most Influential Young Indians. He has served as the brand ambassador for Actimaxx, Seventh Street and Food Safety and Standards Authority of India's eat right movement.

Rao donated an undisclosed amount of money to the PM CARES Fund, the Maharashtra Chief Minister's Relief Fund and Zomato's Feeding India to help feed families in need because of the COVID-19 pandemic in India.

In 2025, Rao featured in the music video for the musical duo Meet Bros' promotional single, "Modi Hai Toh Mumkin Hai", which was a ballad praising the Prime Minister of India, Narendra Modi. The song faced widespread backlash on social media and he was called "spineless" for participating in the song. In 2026, during the Delhi Jantar Mantar protests, Rao voiced his support for the protestors and their cause. In response to a comment referencing the infamous song, Rao hinted that he was pressurized into featuring in the song and that "one song does not define who he is, what he stands for or what his ideologies in life are."
