= Sunil Bohra =

Indian film producer

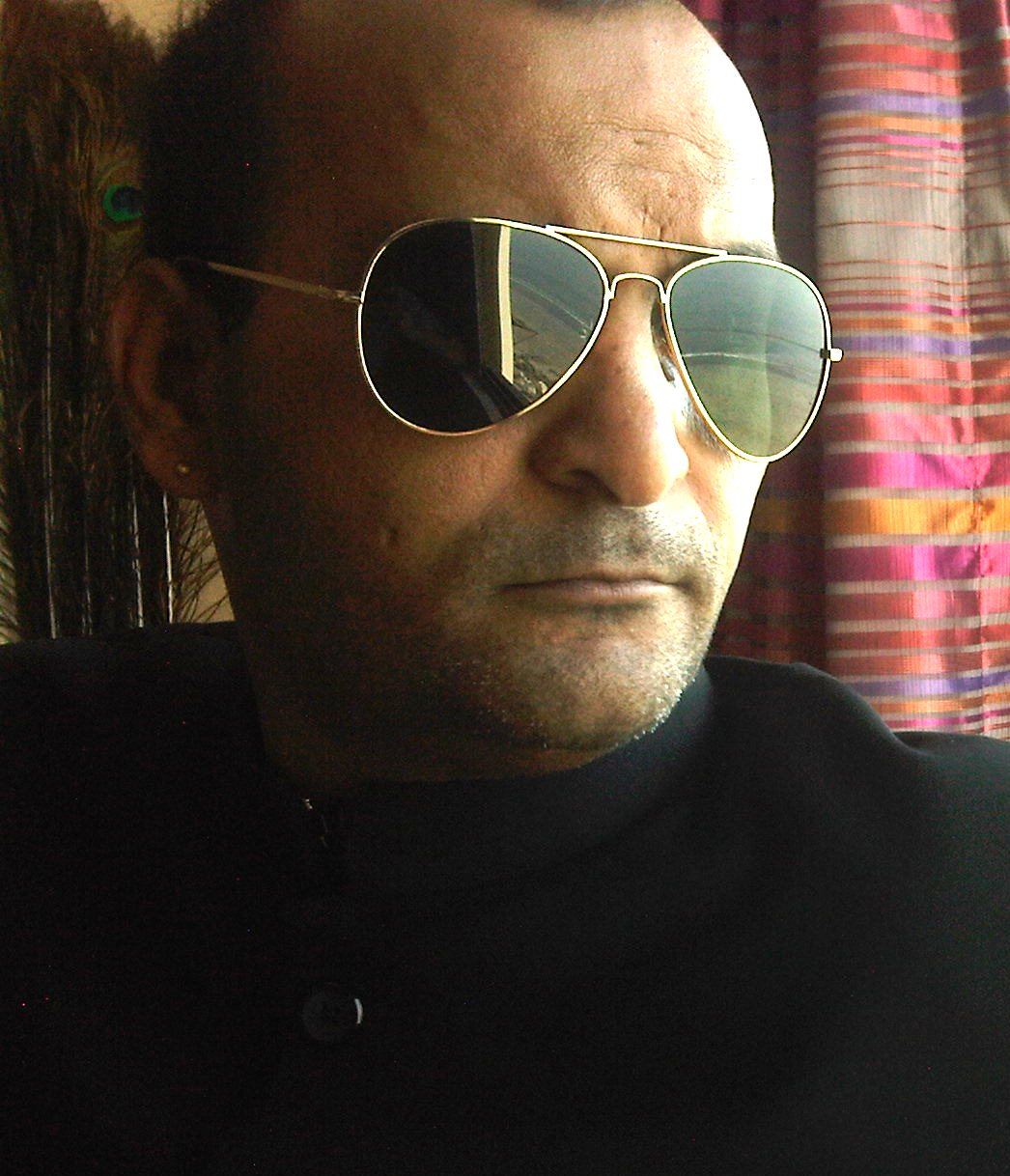
- Sunil Bohra

Sunil Bohra is an Indian film producer. He has produced film like Gangs of Wasseypur, Shahid (film), Tanu Weds Manu, Tanu Weds Manu: Returns, Mastram. He was nominated for a Filmfare Award in the Best Film category for film Gangs of Wasseypur – Part 1 with Anurag Kashyap.

Sunil Bohra was born to Shanti and Surendra Bohra in a third generation of Mumbai Film Industry producers. His grandfather, Sri Ram Bohra, established the Bohra Bros banner as a pioneer of the Mumbai Film Industry in 1947 and was also IMPAA ( Indian Motion Pictures Producers' Association ) for 13 years.
