= Shimla Mirchi =

2020 Indian Hindi-language drama film

- Theatrical release poster
- Directed by: Ramesh Sippy
- Written by: Ramesh Sippy; Kausar Munir; Rishi Virmani; Vipul Binjola
- Based on: De vrais mensonges by Pierre Salvadori
- Produced by: Ramesh Sippy; Rohan Sippy; Kiran Juneja
- Starring: Hema Malini; Rajkummar Rao; Rakul Preet Singh
- Cinematography: Jitan Harmeet Singh
- Edited by: Vijay Venkataramanan
- Music by: Songs: Meet Bros Anjjan; Score: Rohit Kulkrani
- Production companies: Viacom18 Studios; Ramesh Sippy Entertainment
- Distributed by: Viacom18 Studios
- Release date: 3 January 2020
- Country: India
- Language: Hindi
- Box office: est. 0.03 crore

Shimla Mirchi (transl. Bell pepper) is a 2020 Indian Hindi-language romantic drama film directed by Ramesh Sippy, starring Hema Malini, Rajkummar Rao and Rakul Preet Singh. It is jointly produced by Ramesh Sippy, Rohan Sippy and Kiran Juneja. The film was shot in 2014 and set for release in 2015 but had a 5 years delay due to no buyer to buy the film. It was theatrically released in India on 3 January 2020. It marks Ramesh Sippy's return to direction after a 25-year gap.

== Plot ==
Avinash, a former translator at the Japanese Embassy in India, visits a temple with his family, where he meets beautiful Naina and falls for her. His family also encounters Naina in another scene and likes her very much and wants Avi to marry her. To court Naina, Avi stays around the temple and works at her coffee shop that is about to open.

Naina's parents have been separated for long. Her father Tilak even has a new girlfriend around her age. However, her mother Rukmini is always unwilling to sign the divorce paper because she still loves Tilak, and she is having depression due to the situation.

Avi successfully befriends Naina, and sends her an anonymous love letter, which however annoys her but gives her an idea to cheer up her mom. She writes the same letter to her mom, which successfully cheers up the latter and Rukmini decides to find the secret lover.

Meanwhile, Naina gets suspicious about Avi's over-excellence in the job, assuming he is not here to work for her, but to gradually take over the cafe. She fires him, but he says he will stay another month because according to the law, an employer must not fire an employee without providing him with at least a month's advance notice.

Accidentally, Rukmini mistakes Avi for her secret lover. Naina therefore, requests Avi to help by pretending to be her secret lover for a few days. Avi agrees.

After that, Avi realizes Naina is not interested in him at all, and even gets angry when receiving his love letter and that she just wants to use him to cheer up her mom. Upset Avi leaves Naina, but tells her that he was her actual secret lover before leaving.

Rukmini also realizes that Avi loves Naina, and Naina finds out that she loves Avi too. Some time later, Naina receives wedding invitation from Avi. Shocked Naina immediately visits Avi, and asks him to cancel the wedding and marry her instead. Avi agrees.

It is finally revealed that Avi was not actually going to marry. The wedding invitation is a plan made up by Rukmini to re-unite the two lovers. Later in Avi and Naina's wedding, Rukmini meets and reconciles with one of her former lover (Dharmendra).

== Cast ==
- Hema Malini as Rukmini "Mini"
- Rajkummar Rao as Avinash "Avi"
- Rakul Preet Singh as Naina
- Shakti Kapoor as Captain Uncle
- Kiran Juneja as Kannu Bua
- Kanwaljit Singh as Tilak "Tiku"
- Kamlesh Gill as Daadi
- Tarun Wadhwa as Jude
- Priya Raina as Sonu
- Tawhid Rike Zaman as Naina's Friend
- Jagrati Sethia as Mishti
- Nita Mohindra as Avinash's mother
- Zoya Khan as Brownie
- Dharmendra in a guest appearance as Foreign Minister
- Ramesh Sippy in a guest appearance as a person reading a book on the bench

== Release ==
It was theatrically released in India on 3 January 2020. And it was made available on Netflix on 27 January 2020.

== Reception ==
The film received mixed reviews from critics.

Devesh Sharma of Filmfare gave the film 2.5 out of 5 stars and wrote "Ramesh Sippy made films in an era where the narrative took its own time unspooling. Though the length of the film is two hours and 15 minutes, this unhurried style of filmmaking makes it appear longer than the actual length. He added "There's nothing in Rajkummar's and Rakul Preet's love story that we haven't seen before. They make for an interesting pair alright but are following a tried and tested path". Similarly, Nandini Ramnath of Scroll.in rated the film 2.5/5 and wrote "Completed five years ago and out in theatres only now, Shimla Mirchi feels resolutely old-fashioned (which isn’t a bad thing at all) but also fusty (which is)".

Rating the film 2/5, Reza Noorani of The Times of India wrote "Shimla Mirchi' is a bland romantic comedy that needed tighter editing and a better climax. It has an interesting plot with multiple possibilities that could have added flavour to the narrative. But they remain underexplored and the result is an uninspiring, two-hour- long movie that doesn't quite manage to tickle your funny bone".

Kennith Rosario of The Hindu wrote "This supposedly funny plot is so flat that the most amusing part of the film is meta product placements of Kent water purifiers, which Malini endorses in real life".

== Soundtrack ==
Shimla Mirchi

Soundtrack album by Meet Bros Anjjan
- Released: 6 January 2020
- Recorded: 2014–2015
- Genre: Feature film soundtrack
- Length: 18:23
- Language: Hindi
- Label: Zee Music Company
External audio
- Official Audio Jukebox on YouTube

This film's soundtrack is composed by Meet Bros Anjjan with lyrics written by Kumaar.

Track listing
No.	Title	Singer(s)	Length
1.	"Sau Galtiyan"	Meet Bros Anjjan, Yasser Desai, Khushboo Grewal	6:37
2.	"Ishq Di Feeling"	Meet Bros Anjjan, Stebin Ben	4:38
3.	"Mirchi Shimle Di"	Meet Bros Anjjan, Khushboo Grewal, Sanjay Mishra	3:35
4.	"Mainu Rang Lageya"	Meet Bros, Piyush Mehroliyaa	3:33
Total length:			18:23
