= Boyss Toh Boyss Hain =

2013 film by Amit Vats

- Directed by: Amit Vats
- Story by: Satyajit Krushna Mahanti
- Produced by: Chaitannya Swami; Anup Jalota Abhishek Chaudhary
- Starring: Rajkummar Rao; Anshuman Jha; Dhruv Ganesh; Anuj Kumar
- Cinematography: Arvind K
- Edited by: Santosh Mandal
- Music by: Anuj Garg; Sayanthi-Shailendra; Willy; Dhiren Raichura; Dhwanit Joshi
- Distributed by: Khushii Entertainment Productions
- Release date: 12 July 2013
- Country: India
- Language: Hindi

Boyss Toh Boyss Hain (transl. Boys are always boys) is a 2013 Indian Hindi comedy film directed by Amit Vats and produced by Chaitannya Swami and Anup Jalota. The film features Rajkummar Rao, Anshuman Jha, Dhruv Ganesh and Anuj Kumar as main characters.

== Plot ==
The movie Boyss Toh Boyss Hain is based on the lines of the celebrated comic book but is set in Delhi instead of Riverdale. It's a movie about the youthful story of four young guys who face similar problems in their lives. They are looking to fall in love, but the right woman does not seem to be coming their way. The crux of the story is how they eventually find their way to their true love. All this happens in a comical way.

== Cast ==
- Rajkummar Rao as Abhishek
- Anshuman Jha as Karan
- Dhruv Ganesh as Alphanso
- Anuj Kumar as Atal Bihari
- Gulshan Grover as Inspector R. U. Sharma
- Divya Dutta
- Manu Rishi
- Adil Hussain
- Tejaswini Kolhapure
- Sharat Saxena
- Virendra Saxena
- Bhanu Sri Mehra as Twinkle

== Production ==
Anshuman Jha only accepted the role of a sardarji after four narrations of the film's script.

== Reception ==
A critic from The Times of India rated the film 1 1/2 out of 5 stars and wrote that "Lessons on ethics, morality, friendship, love unfortunately get sidelined in this wannabe comedy".
