= Mr. & Mrs. Mahi =

2024 Indian film by Sharan Sharma

- Theatrical release poster
- Directed by: Sharan Sharma
- Written by: Nikhil Mehrotra; Sharan Sharma
- Produced by: Karan Johar; Zee Studios; Hiroo Yash Johar; Apoorva Mehta
- Starring: Rajkumar Rao; Janhvi Kapoor
- Cinematography: Anay Goswamy
- Edited by: Nitin Baid
- Music by: Songs: Vishal Mishra; Tanishk Bagchi; Jaani; Aadesh Shrivastava; Achint–Yuva; Hunny–Bunny; Dhruv Dhalla; Score: John Stewart Eduri
- Production companies: Dharma Productions; Zee Studios
- Distributed by: Zee Studios
- Release date: 31 May 2024
- Running time: 139 minutes
- Country: India
- Language: Hindi
- Budget: ₹40 crore
- Box office: est. ₹51.96 crore

Mr. & Mrs. Mahi is a 2024 Hindi-language romantic sports drama film directed by Sharan Sharma and produced by Zee Studios and Dharma Productions. It stars Rajkummar Rao and Janhvi Kapoor. The film is centered around cricket and both lead actors share the same nickname as the famous Indian cricketer, Mahendra Singh Dhoni. The film was released on 31 May 2024 to mixed reviews from critics, who praised the performances and chemistry of the leads and the film's novel concept but criticised the screenplay and plot. The film turned out to be profitable venture.

== Synopsis ==
Buoyed by the encouragement she receives from her husband Mahi; a practicing doctor eventually gives up her career as a doctor and takes a strike on her cricketing journey, which is reflected in the tagline An Imperfectly Perfect Partnership.

== Plot ==
The virtue of an arranged marriage brings together Mahendra, a failed cricketer, and Mahima, a doctor living in Jaipur. Having the same nickname, Mahi, they together become Mr. and Mrs. Mahi, akin to the nickname of Dhoni. They soon discover their common love and passion for cricket. Mahendra, a failed cricketer who couldn't make it; spots cricketing talent in his wife when he sees her smashing tennis ball sixes and encourages her to chase her dream of becoming a cricketer. During this journey, Mahendra feels let down as his goal to showcase himself as coach rather than his wife as a cricketer, fails. These internal conflict lead to tension between the couple. His mother (Geeta) neutralizes it by sharing her life's experiences. She prods him by saying it's the happiness within oneself and for others that will make one feel successful. This makes Mahi to realize his mistake and make fresh efforts to help his wife. Mahima and her team win the final match of the state tournament, after which she and Mahendra reconcile. Mahima is then selected in the national cricket team, for which she credits Mahendra in the media. The film ends at a national game with Mahima batting and Mahendra with her. During the credits, Mahendra is seen coaching students at his own academy.

== Cast ==
- Rajkummar Rao as Mahendra "Mahi" Aggarwal
- Janhvi Kapoor as Mahima "Mahi" Aggarwal (née Gupta)
- Rajesh Sharma as Benny Dayal Shukla
- Kumud Mishra as Hardayal Aggarwal, Mahendra's father
- Purnendu Bhattacharya as Trilok Gupta, Mahima’s father
- Zarina Wahab as Geeta Aggarwal, Mahendra's mother
- Arjit Taneja as Sikander Aggarwal, Mahendra's brother
- Yamini Das as Kalpana Gupta, Mahima’s mother
- Sandesh Kulkarni as Coach Mangesh
- Dheerendra Kumar Gautam as Guddan
- Shashie Verma as Dr. Patwal
- Dev Chauhan as Vimal
- Deepak Darayani as Dr. Rastogi
- Girish Thapar as Damodar
- Naman Arora as Gyanesh
- Himanshu Jaykar

== Production ==
=== Development ===
The film was announced on 22 November 2021 by Karan Johar, starring Rajkummar Rao and Janhvi Kapoor.

=== Filming ===
Principal photography was commenced on 9 May 2022 and film was shot at various locations in Jaipur. Filming wrapped on 1 May 2023. During filming, Kapoor dislocated her shoulder twice.

== Soundtrack ==
Mr. & Mrs. Mahi

Soundtrack album by Tanishk Bagchi, Vishal Mishra, Jaani, Hunny-Bunny, Aadesh Shrivastava, Achint-Yuva and Dhruv Dhalla
- Released: 24 May 2024
- Recorded: 2022–23
- Genre: Feature film soundtrack
- Length: 29:26
- Language: Hindi
- Label: Sony Music India

Official audio
- Mr. & Mrs. Mahi - Full Album on YouTube

The music for the film is composed by Tanishk Bagchi, Vishal Mishra, Jaani, Hunny-Bunny, Achint-Yuva and Dhruv Dhalla. Lyrics are written by Jaani, Kausar Munir, Vishal Mishra, Azeem Dayani, Sagar, Arushi Kaushal and Devendra Kafir.

The song "Dekhha Tenu" is inspired by the song "Say Shava Shava" from producer Karan Johar's 2001 film Kabhi Khushi Kabhie Gham sung by Alka Yagnik, Sunidhi Chauhan, Udit Narayan, Sudesh Bhonsle, Aadesh Shrivastava, Amitabh Bachchan, composed by Aadesh Shrivastava and written by Sameer Anjaan.

Track listing
No.	Title	Lyrics	Music	Singer(s)	Length
1.	"Dekhha Tenu"	Jaani, Sameer Anjaan	Jaani, Aadesh Shrivastava	Mohammad Faiz	4:42
2.	"Agar Ho Tum"	Kausar Munir	Tanishk Bagchi	Jubin Nautiyal	4:13
3.	"Roya Jab Tu"	Vishal Mishra, Azeem Dayani	Vishal Mishra	Vishal Mishra	5:00
4.	"Tu Hain Toh"	Sagar	Hunny-Bunny	Hunny-Bunny, Sagar	4:44
5.	"Junoon Hain"	Arushi Kaushal	Achint-Yuva	Achint	3:27
6.	"Ranjhana"	Devendra Kafir	Dhrruv Dhalla	Kavita Seth, Laqshay Kapoor	3:51
7.	"Tu Hain Toh" (Female Version)	Sagar	Hunny-Bunny	Neeti Mohan	3:29
Total length:					29:26

== Promotion and release ==
=== Promotion ===
Janhvi Kapoor took the lead in the promotion of 'Mr and Mrs Mahi' and visited 'pink city' Jaipur to promote her film. She even visited the local market to taste the city's famous lassi.

=== Theatrical ===
The film was initially announced to release on 7 October 2022 but the production was deferred. Later it was planned to release on 15 March 2024 and then 19 April 2024, but was again postponed. The film was eventually released theatrically on 31 May 2024.

=== Home media ===
The film was premiered on Netflix from 26 July 2024.

== Reception ==
=== Box office ===
Mr. & Mrs. Mahi surpassed Fighter to achieve the highest record for advance ticket sales for a Hindi film in 2024 at ₹ 2.5 lakh as the film benefitted from the subsidised prices on Cinema Lovers Day. The film grossed ₹6.85 crore on its opening day, the seventh-highest for a Hindi film in 2024. As of July 2024 the film has grossed ₹43.19 crore in India and ₹8.77 crore internationally, for a total worldwide gross of ₹51.96 crore.

=== Review ===
On the review aggregator website Rotten Tomatoes, 64% of 11 critics' reviews are positive, with an average rating of 5.4/10. Mr. & Mrs. Mahi received mixed reviews from critics who praised the performances and chemistry of the leads and the film's novel concept but criticised the screenplay and plot.

A critic for Bollywood Hungama rated the film 3.5 stars out of 5 and wrote "Mr & Mrs Mahi is a decent flick with the performances, plot and a clap-worthy interval point as its USP".

Shilajit Mitra of The Hindu opined "It is difficult to concentrate on Mr. and Mrs Mahi without being constantly reminded of other films. There’s nary an idea, visual or soundtrack choice that feels particularly fresh".

Sukanya Verma of Rediff.com rated 3/5 stars and notes "I liked how the film finds excitement in Mahendra and Mahima's dull lives and transforms their humdrum existence into an ode to second chances".

Shubhra Gupta of The Indian Express rated 2.5/5 and wrote "The film is giving us a rom com nestled in India’s favourite sports, which in turn is nestled in the tropes of the family-entertainer movie".

Saibal Chatterjee of NDTV rated 2/5 stars to the movie and stated "The conflicting and convoluted messaging is a mishit that lands nowhere".

Monika Rawal Kukreja reviewing for Hindustan Times wrote "It's an ambitious sports film that tries to make a point, but sadly misses the shot".

Manjusha Radhakrishnan for Gulf News rated 2.5/5 and wrote, "For a one-time watch, this movie is serviceable. It may not be as exciting as an IPL final match, but it has its good moments that make it worth our time."
