= Trapped (2016 Hindi film) =

2016 film by Vikramaditya Motwane

- Theatrical release poster
- Directed by: Vikramaditya Motwane
- Written by: Amit Joshi; Hardik Mehta
- Produced by: Madhu Mantena; Vikas Bahl; Anurag Kashyap; Vikramaditya Motwane
- Starring: Rajkummar Rao; Geetanjali Thapa
- Cinematography: Siddharth Diwan
- Edited by: Nitin Baid
- Music by: Alokananda Dasgupta
- Production company: Phantom Films
- Distributed by: Reliance Entertainment
- Release dates: 26 October 2016 (Mumbai Film Festival); 17 March 2017 (India)
- Running time: 105 minutes
- Country: India
- Language: Hindi
- Budget: ₹5 crore
- Box office: ₹3.53 crore

Trapped is a 2016 Indian Hindi-language survival drama film directed by Vikramaditya Motwane, who also co-produced it with Anurag Kashyap, Vikas Bahl and Madhu Mantena under the banner of Phantom Films. The film stars Rajkummar Rao as a call centre employee who gets trapped in his apartment room without food, water, and electricity, and Geetanjali Thapa as his girlfriend.

Motwane got the idea for the film from an e-mail from writer Amit Joshi. He liked the idea and asked Joshi to send a full script, which he received a month later. The script was later re-written by Joshi and Hardik Mehta who turned the 130-page draft into 40 pages. Trapped was primarily shot over a period of 20 days, at an apartment in Mumbai. The film's music and background score were composed by Alokananda Dasgupta, with lyrics by Rajeshwari Dasgupta. Siddharth Diwan was the cinematographer, and Nitin Baid was the editor.

Trapped premiered on 26 October 2016 at the Mumbai Film Festival, where it received a standing ovation. It was released in theatres on 17 March 2017 to positive reviews from critics, who praised both the concept of the film and Rao's performance. It grossed a total of ₹3.53 crore (US$370,000) at the box office. The film received several awards, including the Critics Award for Best Actor for Rao, Best Sound Design for Anish John and Best Editing Award for Nitin Baid, at the 63rd Filmfare Awards.

== Plot ==
Shaurya, a call centre employee plans to elope and marry his girlfriend Noorie, a day before Noorie's arranged marriage with someone else. Shaurya, who lives in a bachelor pad, makes plans to move to a new flat that will accommodate him and Noorie. In a rush to find affordable housing, he ends up moving into Swarg, a new high-rise apartment complex, which is empty due to construction and legal issues. The lone watchman stationed at the building is unaware that Shaurya has moved in, and Noorie does not yet know Shaurya's new address.

The next morning Shaurya inadvertently locks himself inside the apartment. He makes some initial attempts to break open the lock but fails. The apartment has faulty wiring which leads to the circuit getting tripped, leaving him without electricity. His phone runs out of battery before he can call for help. Shaurya, totally disconnected from the outside world, struggles to survive without food, water and electricity. As the days pass, he becomes progressively more claustrophobic, and his attempts to escape become more desperate. At one point, he uses his own blood to trace the word "help" with details of his address on a cardboard paper, which falls on the terrace of a house nearby. The house's resident questions the clueless watchman about it, who claims that the building is empty. She hesitantly starts to go up to investigate but soon gives up.

Desperate for food, Shaurya resorts to eating cockroaches, ants and pigeons and also starts talking to a rat for company. To his relief, it rains heavily after some days, and Shaurya collects as much water as possible in empty containers. He manages to survive for almost a week, but his health deteriorates due to starvation, dehydration, and isolation. In a final, desperate attempt to escape, Shaurya begins sawing through the balcony gate with a metal sheet, and ultimately succeeds. He climbs down five floors, almost falling off several times due to exhaustion, before managing to reach a floor which has no balcony gates, and finally escapes the building. Fainting due to fatigue and weakness, he is rushed to the hospital. A week later, he is visited by Noorie, who reveals that she is now married since she thought that he had abandoned her. Heartbroken and traumatised by the incident, Shaurya tries to return to his normal life, but is shattered to see that his friends and colleagues had not even noticed his absence, as they are all too busy with their own lives.

== Cast ==
- Rajkummar Rao as Shaurya
- Geetanjali Thapa as Noorie
- Yogendra Vikram Singh as Broker 3
- Khushboo Upadhyay as the "girl next door"
- R. N. Shukla as the watchman
- Patrick Graham as Hawk McNab

== Production ==
=== Development ===
Trapped originated from the first-time screenwriter Amit Joshi, who had left his job in a telecommunications company to write full-time. He says the idea for the film came to him from "a desire to write something that wasn't buried in layers". Joshi found the situation for the film when he was auto-locked inside his flat for half an hour in Goregaon, Mumbai. After working on the idea, he visited the Phantom Films office in April 2015 and managed to meet director Vikramaditya Motwane at the gate, where he told Motwane that he had an idea for a film. Motwane liked his idea and asked him to send it in an e-mail. He received a synopsis for a film from Joshi that he found "really interesting". He liked the idea and told Joshi to send him a full screenplay, which he received within a month. Motwane then introduced Joshi to Hardik Mehta, who was one of his assistant directors on Lootera (2013). Mehta and Joshi worked for the next few months on the script and turned the 130-page draft into forty pages. Motwane said in an interview with Alaka Sahani of The Indian Express that the film was "accessible" and portrayed a situation that could "happen to anyone", pointing out that everyone would have a "fear of getting trapped in a certain place or being locked out of our houses." He also said that the film included several urban scenarios that could happen to anyone, like forgetting to charge one's phone. Motwane briefed his writers to add humour to the story after the first half because he wanted to make a more accessible film for the audience to understand and was not aiming for a "claustrophobic" feel, as in The Martian (2015), where Matt Damon starts joking about his situation. He was treating Trapped as a side project since he was busy with films like Bhavesh Joshi and AK vs SK. When he realised that the latter was not happening, he started working on Trapped. Motwane mentioned in an interview that the film's development, right from the time he got the e-mail to the start of the shoot, took four to five months to be completed.

=== Casting and filming ===
After discussing the film with Rajkummar Rao, Motwane cast him, believing he had an "interesting vulnerability" and a "never-say-die attitude". The crew was already in place, and they only needed to find the right location for the film. Motwane initially wanted a location that was on the outskirts of Mumbai, as he wanted to see the city from a distance and yet "feel you are away from it". His crew recced more than twenty buildings in the city when one of his assistant directors was walking around in Prabhadevi and saw an abandoned thirty-storey building that had not got an occupancy certificate. The film was shot on the thirtieth floor of the building, which had an elevator operating only to the twenty-fifth floor. The crew would climb five floors every day with equipment, and on several occasions the elevator did not function, leading them to climb all thirty floors. Filming in the middle of the city resulted in some changes to the script. According to Rao, ninety percent of the film was shot in the building.

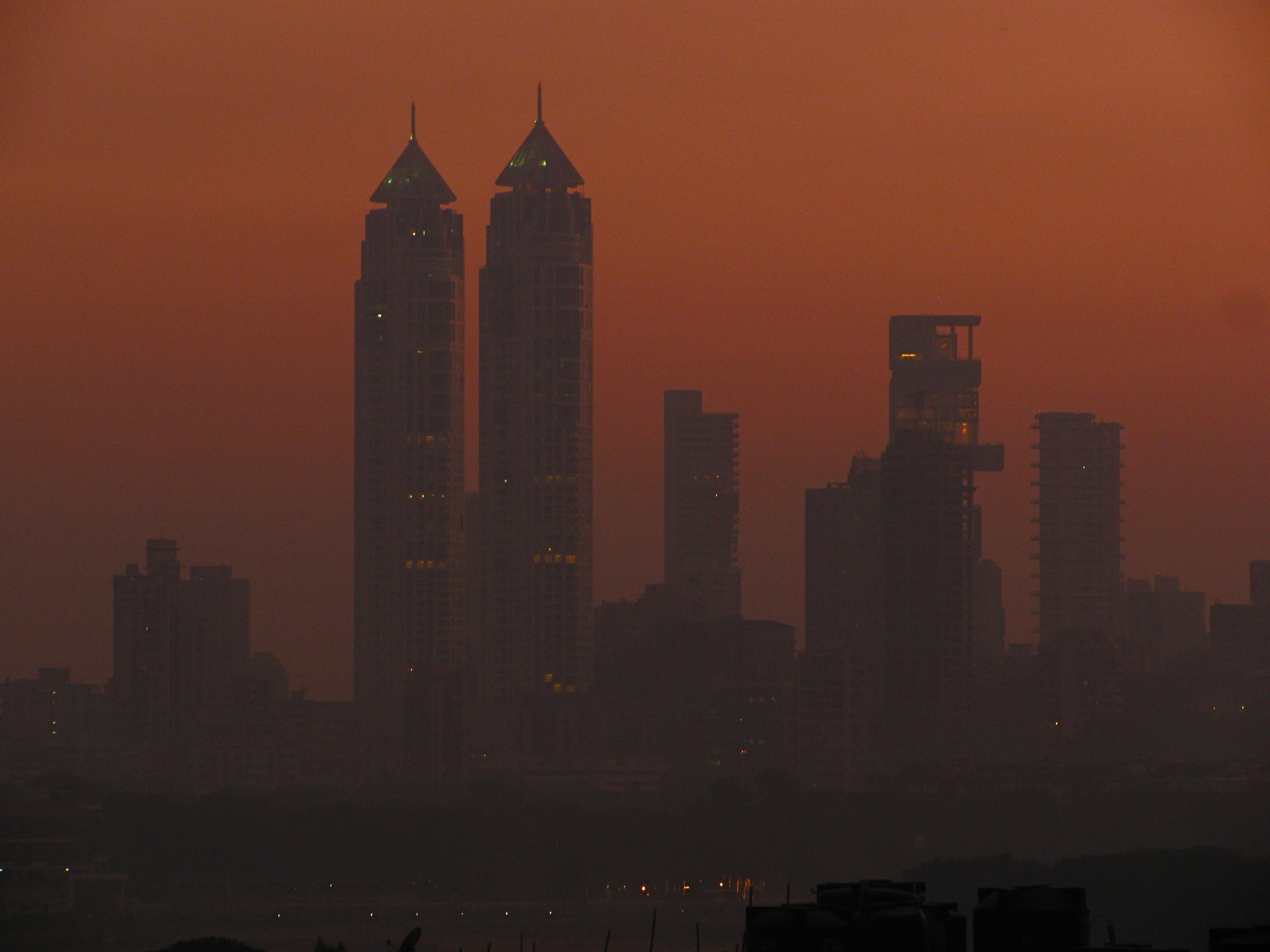
The protagonist in the film gets trapped in a Mumbai high rise.

Motwane has a fear of mice, and as a result, had characters of mice in the film which he felt was a "good opportunity" to get over his fear. He expressed that the survival drama genre in Indian cinema was still in a nascent stage and felt the film is along the lines of Cast Away (2000), 127 Hours (2010) and Buried (2010). He mentioned that the character in the film was portrayed in a quirky and voyeuristic way, allowing the audience the experience of enjoying a man's misery.

The film was shot in chronological order in twenty days. It is Motwane's first film shot in digital video format. He also decided to not go for a widescreen aspect ratio and rather opted for a more compressed look because of the nature of the film, as he wanted to create a claustrophobic feel. Because of the film's genre, Motwane made sure that it was fast-paced so that the audience would not get bored. Motwane had mentioned the plans for the film to Rao during the screening of Masaan in July 2015. When his film Bhavesh Joshi did not work out, he asked Rao if he could spare twenty days in the following month for Trapped, to which he agreed. Rao discussed the character of Shaurya with Motwane prior to filming. He said, "Once I figured out how he is, the rest was organic. Of course, how Shaurya would behave on the tenth day wasn't discovered until I actually did it." Geetanjali Thapa played the role of Noorie, Shaurya's love interest, and Khushboo Upadhyay portrayed a woman living near Shaurya's apartment, credited onscreen as "girl next door".

Rao found the role of Shaurya to be one of his most challenging works to date. He had to lose weight and remained on a carrot and coffee diet throughout the course of filming, as he wanted to accurately depict the character eating improper food during the time he is stuck inside the apartment. Despite being a vegan, Rao ate meat in some of the scenes for the first time in his life, as Motwane preferred it to be realistic. Within three weeks of deciding to do Trapped, it began its principal photography. This hasty way of film-making made Motwane feel like it was a student project. Motwane and his cinematographer, Siddharth Diwan, decided to use the Red Epic Dragon camera, which they felt was suited to shooting in enclosed spaces. Most of the scenes in the film were improvised, and none were rehearsed in advance, as Motwane did not want to "telegraph" the situation. Several scenes, such as Shaurya's first attempt to open the locked door, were shot in long takes of eight to ten minutes' duration. Motwane intentionally kept the character away from having suicidal thoughts, as he felt it would be a very obvious choice. Trapped was edited by Nitin Baid, while Kazvin Dongar and Anish John served as the art director and sound designer respectively.

== Themes ==
Vikramaditya Motwane said in an interview that he was attracted by the film's theme of urban loneliness. The lead character, Shaurya, is an immigrant in the city and has an anonymous job. He is a loner with no friend or family to come looking for him if he goes missing. When he begins a relationship with Noorie, they are "alone together", because "it's only each other that they actually have". Trisha Gupta of Mumbai Mirror observed that unlike the survival dramas of Hollywood, where the protagonist is caught between rocks, cornered by wolves, afloat in the ocean, or stuck with a tiger on a ship in the ocean, the protagonist of Trapped gets trapped in an apartment located in the middle of the city with some of the basic facilities. Gupta further said that the film "takes a sharp look at the Indian city and our particular isolation in it." She pointed out the contrast in the building's name, Swarg (Hindi for heaven).

According to Uday Bhatia of Mint, all of Motwane's films are about individuals who are trapped in various ways by their life choices and social stations. Anupama Chopra called the film a "singularly Mumbai movie" and wrote, "Where else can a man be surrounded by thousands of people and yet be so utterly alone?" Namrata Joshi from The Hindu felt that the film's horror and danger lurks in the ordinary and the everyday of anyone, saying, "dysfunctional locks, forgotten keys, mobiles with discharged batteries, water cuts and electrical outages—we have all been there."

== Soundtrack ==
Trapped

Soundtrack album by Alokananda Dasgupta
- Released: 2017
- Genre: Feature film soundtrack
- Length: 10:44
- Language: Hindi
- Label: Zee Music Company
- Producer: Alokananda Dasgupta

Alokananda Dasgupta chronology
Asha Jaoar Majhe (2014)	Trapped (2017)	Breathe (2018)

The film's soundtrack album and background score were composed by Alokananda Dasgupta, with lyrics by Rajeshwari Dasgupta. The album rights of the film were acquired by Zee Music Company, and the album was released on 11 March 2017. According to Motwane, musicals were used in the film "to get monotony into the film without making it seem monotonous". The two sounds in the trailer, a metallic clanking and a tapping, were inspired from the sound of rhythmic breathing in The Revenant (2015). The album consisted of four tracks, including two instrumentals.

The album generally received a positive response. Devansh Sharma of Firstpost wrote about the song "Dheemi", which was voiced by Tejas Menon, "[it] explores the familiar zone of falling in love slowly and surely. But it differs from its predecessors in terms of the freshness it brings to the ears." A reviewer from The Indian Express wrote regarding the song "Hai Tu", which was voiced by Gowri Jayakumar, "The minimalistic approach with dominant violin and piano notes lifts your mood. That's not to say that the song doesn't have shades of gloom and melancholy."

Track listing
No.	Title	Lyrics	Singer(s)	Length
1.	"Dheemi"	Rajeshwari Dasgupta	Tejas Menon	2:30
2.	"Hai Tu"	Rajeshwari Dasgupta	Gowri Jayakumar	3:04
3.	"Trapped (Theme)"	Instrumental	Alokananda Dasgupta	3:36
4.	"I am Trapped (Theme)"	Instrumental	Alokananda Dasgupta	1:49
Total length:				10:44

== Marketing and release ==
Trapped had its world premiere on 26 October 2016 at the Mumbai Film Festival, where it received a standing ovation from the audience. The film won the Best Asian Film award at the 2017 Neuchâtel International Fantastic Film Festival. One scene, in which Rao's character talks to the mice about women's figures, was removed by the Central Board of Film Certification. The title of the film was tentatively called Trapped, but Motwane declared that it would be changed following the premiere and asked the audience to suggest an appropriate name. In the end, the title was kept. Trapped was released in DVD format on 15 April 2017. It is one of the few Indian films released without an interval. Phantom Films requested their exhibition partners to release it that way, as Motwane said, "the no-interval viewing allows the viewer to feel the character's emotion and gives them a never-before thrilling experience".

The first poster of the film was released on 10 February 2017 by Rajkummar Rao from his Twitter handle. The poster featured Rao trapped in a balcony with his clothes displaying the word 'help'. A second poster featuring Rao staring at a cockroach and an ant was released on 19 February 2017. It was promoted with the tagline "Freedom lies beyond fear". The film's teaser was released on 20 February 2017, and the official theatrical trailer was launched on 22 February 2017. A special screening was held on 14 March in Mumbai, which was attended by several actors, including Kriti Sanon, Taapsee Pannu, and Richa Chadda. Trapped was released in theatres in India on 300 screens on 17 March 2017. It was released in approximately forty to fifty screens overseas. Zee TV bought its satellite and music rights. The film is also available for viewing on Amazon Prime Video.

== Reception ==
=== Critical response ===
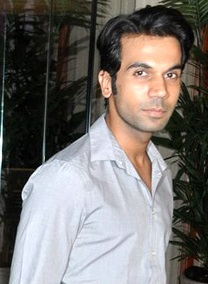
Rao was praised by critics for his performance in the film.

Upon release, Trapped received mostly positive responses from critics. Rohit Vats of Hindustan Times gave a positive review, writing, "Trapped is unique because it's unlike any other one-room drama. It remains a personal story, more like a leaf out of Shaurya's life than a cinematic celebration of a survivor." Rajeev Masand praised Rao's performance, calling it his "finest work till date". He also pointed out the length of the film, which he felt was "long and stretched". Masand included it in his "best film list" of 2017. Baradwaj Rangan complimented the film and called it a "beautifully acted, directed" film. Anupama Chopra in her review denoted the film as "ultimate urban nightmare" and wrote: "Trapped is a tight-wire act, which would collapse without the masterful Rajkummar Rao. Ananya Bhattacharya of India Today gave a positive response, writing, "Rajkummar Rao and his terrific act deserve a watch."

Writing for NDTV, Raja Sen found it "compelling" but mentioned that the struggle shown in the film was "too linear and predictable". Subhash K. Jha praised Rao's performance and wrote: "[Rao's] character's awful predicament is so tangibly tactile as to leave us shaken for good." Mayank Shekhar from Mid-Day gave a positive response, writing, "[that the film] manages to grippingly hold your attention with such an underwhelming Setting is an achievement in itself." Rohit Bhatnagar of the Deccan Chronicle said, "It is so difficult for the reviewer to find a flaw. Overall, Trapped is a brilliant film with a crisp narrative that will keep you glued till the last frame." Shilpa Jamkhandikar of Reuters, also praised Rao's performance. She wrote, "Trapped is one of those films taken to another level only on the strength of a powerhouse performance, and Rajkummar Rao will be remembered for this one for a long, long time."

In contrast to the positive reviews, Anna M. M. Vetticad wrote, "What the film ends up being then is a series of oh-my-did-he-really-do-that and what-would-I-have-done-in-the-same-situation moments, which too lose their sheen in the last half-hour." Shubhra Gupta felt the film was "uneven" and lacked "enough genuinely scary heart-in-mouth moments". A review from the Indo-Asian News Service carried by Sify called the film "exhausting and fabricated" and made viewers feel "trapped in the auditorium".

=== Box office ===
Trapped was released alongside Machine and Beauty and the Beast and grossed ₹3.1 million (US$32,000) in its opening day at the box office. It collected ₹14.4 million (US$150,000) during the weekend and ₹3 million (US$31,000) in its second week, with a total of ₹23.3 million (US$240,000). Trapped earned a total of ₹28.5 million (US$300,000) by the end of its theatrical run and is considered a commercial success.

=== Awards ===
Awards	Category	Nominee	Status	Ref(s)
63rd Filmfare Awards	Best Actor (Critics)	Rajkummar Rao	Won	
63rd Filmfare Awards	Best Sound Design	Anish John	Won	
63rd Filmfare Awards	Best Editing	Nitin Baid	Won	
63rd Filmfare Awards	Best Film (Critics)	Vikramaditya Motwane	Nominated	
63rd Filmfare Awards	Best Story	Amit Joshi	Nominated	
63rd Filmfare Awards	Best Screenplay	Amit Joshi, Hardik Mehta	Nominated	
63rd Filmfare Awards	Best Background Score	Alokananda Dasgupta	Nominated	
