= Bheed =

2023 Indian film by Anubhav Sinha

- Theatrical release poster
- Directed by: Anubhav Sinha
- Written by: Anubhav Sinha; Saumya Tiwari; Sonali Jain
- Story by: Anubhav Sinha
- Produced by: Anubhav Sinha
- Starring: Rajkummar Rao; Bhumi Pednekar; Dia Mirza; Ashutosh Rana; Pankaj Kapur; Kritika Kamra
- Cinematography: Soumik Mukherjee
- Edited by: Atanu Mukherjee
- Music by: Anurag Saikia
- Production company: Benaras Media Works
- Distributed by: AA Films (India); Reliance Entertainment (Overseas)
- Release date: 24 March 2023
- Running time: 114 minutes
- Country: India
- Language: Hindi
- Box office: ₹3.33 crore

Bheed (transl. Crowd) is a 2023 Indian Hindi-language social drama film directed, co-written and produced by Anubhav Sinha as a fictional story set in the 2020 COVID-19 lockdown in India. It stars Rajkummar Rao, Bhumi Pednekar, Dia Mirza, Ashutosh Rana, Pankaj Kapur and Kritika Kamra.

Filming commenced in October 2021 and ended in December 2021. It was released on 24 March 2023 to positive reviews, but became a financial failure. At 69th Filmfare Awards, the film received four nomination, including Best Film (Critics) and Best Actor (Critics) for Rao.

== Premise ==
Bheed is a fictitious account of the largest migration in Indian history (since the 1947 partition) during the quarantine in 2020. It tells the story of how several characters deal with the lockdown and migrate to a safe place.

== Cast ==
- Rajkummar Rao as Inspector Surya Kumar Singh Tikas
- Bhumi Pednekar as Renu Sharma
- Dia Mirza as Geetanjali
- Ashutosh Rana as Inspector Subhash Yadav
- Pankaj Kapur as Balram Trivedi
- Kritika Kamra as Reporter Vidhi Prabhakar
- Aditya Shrivastav as Ram Singh
- Veerendra Saxena as Hari Dubey
- Harsh Purwar as Gonu
- Omkar Das Manikpuri
- Mahesh Chandra Deva
- Sushil Pandey as Kanhaiyya

== Music ==
Bheed

Soundtrack album by Anurag Saikia
- Released: 1 April 2023
- Genre: Feature film soundtrack
- Length: 8:24
- Language: Hindi
- Label: T-Series

Anurag Saikia chronology
Anek (2022)	Bheed (2023)

Official audio
- Bheed - Full Album on YouTube

The music of the film is composed by Anurag Saikia. The first single titled "Herail Ba" was released on 21 March 2023.

Track listing
No.	Title	Lyrics	Singer(s)	Length
1.	"Herail Ba"	Dr Sagar	Omprakash Yadav, Anurag Saikia	5:12
2.	"Chanda Mama"	Shakeel Azmi	Romy, Anurag Saikia	3:12
Total length:				8:24

== Reception ==
On the review aggregator website Rotten Tomatoes, 88% of 16 critics' reviews are positive, with an average rating of 6.6/10.

Bheed met to generally positive reviews. Saibal Chatterjee of NDTV gave it 4 stars out of five praising the performance of the cast and direction and stating that Bheed makes its point. Bheed does an admirable job of telling a story - or rather, a number of stories - that simply needed to be told. he also praised director Anubhav Sinha, he said Anubhav Sinha does not hesitate to confront the rot face. Is there anything more thrilling than a filmmaker making a statement and being taken seriously?.

Film Critic Subhash K. Jha highly praised the film calling it a masterpiece. He Termed Bheed as more than a film. he praised the performance of Pankaj Kapur and Rajkumar Rao and Bhumi. He said in his review that The power dynamics of class and caste in India are better understood and depicted by Anubhav Sinha than any other Indian filmmaker. We owe this superb storyteller who tells it like it is our gratitude only for this. Please accept it or not.

Yatamanyu Narain Of News18 gave the film 4 out of 5 stars. He wrote, "Anubhav Sinha's Bheed might be a film for some but for many, it's bound to be a cathartic journey into the prologue to the darkest chapters of humanity that left the world gasping for air. Rajkummar Rao, Bhumi Pednekar, Pankaj Kapur starrer is an important story that dexterously rewinds the time for you and takes you back to that fateful date when India's first lockdown was announced. What followed was a trail of decisions promulgated in view of preventing the outbreak but what it actually did was render thousands of people on a homeward-bound journey with bare necessities in hand. Bheed captured the pathos, pangs, and grief of the marginalized through empathy and compassion tinted-lens."

Cath Clarke of The Guardian gave the film 3 out of 5 stars. She praised the story and stated that "the caste system serves as the foundation for much of the nation's division and strife, as shown in a gripping, state-of-the-nation drama set in the Covid era of India."

Anna MM Vetticad writes in the Firstpost. She said that Bheed relates to the dissemination of false information during the pandemic on social media and WhatsApp. Government apathy to the misery of the populace, especially the impoverished, looms large in the background without being explicitly stated. But neither is the main focus of the movie. Bheed focuses on the social rift that emerges even when a tragedy is playing out, namely racism stemming from the upper caste, upper-class avarice, and religion.

Archika Khurana of The Times of India gave 3.5 stars out of 5. She stated Anubhav Sinha accurately captures the pain endured by hundreds of people in his movie depiction of a particular stage of the pandemic and makes it not an easy watch.

Davesh Shrama of Filmfare also gave 3.5 stars out of 5. He praises the film and write in his review that The movie highlights the plight of the oppressed while also highlighting the stark religious, racial, and caste divide that still exists in our nation. The director doesn't mince words. He doesn't engage in melodrama either.

Abhimanyu Mathur of DNA praises the lead actors performance and direction. He said in his review that Bheed is a sobering and challenging to watch account of the migrants' plight during the initial lockdown. Nonetheless, it raises questions about how fleeting human memory is. These are events that have happened around us in the last three years. And yet, despite the highest level of documentation of everything that occurs worldwide, these atrocities remain unremembered. That is Bheed's biggest triumph. For those who were most negatively impacted by the lockdowns, it is able to recapture the stark hardness of those times. For a change, those who were battling for their lives are the only thing everybody is talking about.

== Accolades ==
Year (Note: Refers to the year in which the ceremony was held.)	Award	Category	Recipient(s)	Result	Ref.
2024	69th Filmfare Awards	Best Film (Critics)	Anubhav Sinha	Nominated	
2024	69th Filmfare Awards	Best Story	Anubhav Sinha	Nominated	
2024	69th Filmfare Awards	Best Actor (Critics)	Rajkummar Rao	Nominated	
2024	69th Filmfare Awards	Best Sound Design	Anita Kushwaha	Nominated	
