= Shahid (film) =

2012 Indian film by Hansal Mehta

- Theatrical release poster
- Directed by: Hansal Mehta
- Written by: Sameer Gautam Singh; Apurva Asrani
- Produced by: Anurag Kashyap; Sunil Bohra; Ronnie Screwvala; Siddharth Roy Kapur
- Starring: Rajkummar Rao; Tigmanshu Dhulia; Kay Kay Menon; Prabhleen Sandhu; Prabal Panjabi
- Cinematography: Anuj Rakesh Dhawan
- Edited by: Apurva Asrani
- Music by: Karan Kulkarni
- Production companies: UTV Spotboy; AKFPL; Bohra Bros
- Distributed by: UTV Motion Pictures
- Release dates: 6 September 2012 (Toronto); 18 October 2013 (India)
- Running time: 123 minutes
- Country: India
- Language: Hindi
- Budget: ₹65 lakh
- Box office: ₹3.70 crore

Shahid is a 2012 Indian Hindi-language biographical drama film directed by Hansal Mehta, written by Sameer Gautam Singh and jointly produced by Anurag Kashyap and Sunil Bohra in association with Ronnie Screwvala and Siddharth Roy Kapur under the UTV Spotboy banner. Based on the life of lawyer and human rights activist Shahid Azmi, who was assassinated in 2010, the film stars Rajkummar Rao as Azmi; Mohammed Zeeshan Ayyub, Prabhleen Sandhu and Baljinder Kaur appear in supporting roles.

Mehta took a break after some of his films were box-office failures. When he heard about Azmi's murder, he felt the need to make a film about his life. He began his research for the film nearly three months after Azmi's murder. Eventually, he met Singh, who wrote the script after researching Azmi's life and spending months interviewing Azmi's family. Apurva Asrani contributed additional inputs on the script with Mehta and also served as the film's editor. Anuj Rakesh Dhawan was the director of photography.

Shahid had its world premiere at the 2012 Toronto International Film Festival's City to City programme in 2012. It was screened at several other film festivals including the 14th Mumbai Film Festival, the New York Indian Film Festival, the Indian Film Festival of Stuttgart, the Dubai International Film Festival and the Chicago South Asian Film Festival. The film was awarded the Silver Gateway Trophy at the Mumbai Film Festival, while Mehta won the Best Director award. Mehta also won the best director award at the New York Indian Film Festival and at the Indian Film Festival of Stuttgart. It was released theatrically in India on 18 October 2013 and met with critical acclaim. Rao received the Best Actor Award and Mehta the Best Director Award at the 61st National Film Awards ceremony.

== Plot ==
During the 1992 Bombay riots, a young Shahid Azmi and his family witness horrific communal violence. Deeply traumatized, Shahid flees to Kashmir and enters a militant training camp. However, after witnessing a brutal execution, he grows disillusioned and returns home to Mumbai. Shortly after his return, he is arrested under the Terrorist and Disruptive Activities (Prevention) Act (TADA) for an alleged conspiracy to assassinate political leaders. Despite his brother Arif's attempts to secure bail, Shahid is tortured into signing a false confession and sentenced to seven years in Tihar Jail. During his incarceration, he resists brainwashing attempts by fellow inmate Omar Sheikh and is instead inspired by another prisoner, Ghulam Nabi War, to pursue an education.

Upon his acquittal, Shahid returns to Mumbai, completes a law degree, and briefly apprentices under veteran lawyer Maqbool Memon. With Arif's financial backing, he establishes his own independent practice and marries Mariam, a young divorcee. Driven by his past experiences with institutional injustice, Shahid begins defending indigent Muslim youths wrongfully accused of terrorism under the Prevention of Terrorism Act (POTA), often working pro bono. He secures his first major victory by winning an acquittal for Arif Paanwala, a suspect in the 2002 Mumbai bus bombing, due to a complete lack of forensic evidence.

Shahid's profile grows as he takes on defense cases for the accused in the 2006 Mumbai train bombings, the Aurangabad arms haul, and the 2006 Malegaon bombings. His work draws intense public scrutiny and malicious media labeling, resulting in non-stop death threats that strain his domestic life. On one occasion, assailants violently assault him and blacken his face outside the courtroom. Undeterred, Shahid takes up the defense of Faheem Ansari in the high-profile 2008 Mumbai attacks case. While deep in trial preparation, two gunmen infiltrate Shahid's office and assassinate him. The film concludes by noting that the Supreme Court of India ultimately acquitted Ansari of all charges due to a total lack of evidence, vindicating Shahid's legal defense.

== Cast ==
- Rajkummar Rao as Shahid Azmi
- Mohammed Zeeshan Ayyub as Arif Azmi
- Tigmanshu Dhulia as Maqbool Memon
- Kay Kay Menon as Ghulam Navi Waar
- Prabal Panjabi as Omar Sheikh
- Prabhleen Sandhu as Mariam
- Vivek Ghamande as Faheem Ansari
- Baljinder Kaur as Ammi
- Shalini Vatsa as Prosecutor Tambe
- Akash Sinha as Ramanathan
- Vipin Sharma as Prosecutor More

== Production ==
"I was very mesmerised by this young lad who had taken on the system on his own. He was killed at 32, but there was so much he had achieved before that. I knew there was a story to tell there."

— Mehta on the film.

=== Development ===
Mehta stated in an interview with Priyanka Pereira of The Wall Street Journal that he needed a break after some of his films proved to be a box-office failures, like Woodstock Villa (2007) and Raakh (2010). On 11 February 2010, lawyer Shahid Azmi was shot dead in his office in Mumbai at the age of 32. He had represented those accused of the 2006 Mumbai train bombings, the 2006 Malegaon bombings and while he was defending Faheem Ansari in the 2008 Mumbai attacks case, he was killed. Azmi was arrested during the communal riots of 1992–1993 in Mumbai and later studied law and began defending people arrested on false charges. The lawyer secured 17 acquittals in his seven-year career. Mehta said that when he heard about Azmi's murder, he had a sense that the tale of his life could pull his "creativity out of the rut". He felt that Azmi lived an "ordinary life, with extraordinary conviction to do what he believed was right" and that his story "had to be told". Mehta began his research nearly three months after Azmi's murder. He later met writer Sameer Gautam Singh, who approached Mehta with a script. Mehta said he could not make a film with the script and asked him if he was would co-write another script with him. Singh agreed, and Mehta sent him along with his son Jai Mehta to Azmi's hometown to meet his family. They interviewed his family members and friends for two months. Mehta chose not to go with them as he feared that on seeing a filmmaker, Azmi's family and friends would "alter the version" of his life.

Both Mehta and Singh read several of Azmi's cases for the story. Mehta noticed that they were written in simple English that could be understood by anyone: "It told me he was a no-nonsense guy. He wanted to fight the battle and not beat around the bush." Mehta and Singh also met his colleagues, attended court sessions, petitions, litigations and learned how to get a client acquitted. Mehta later went to seek permission to make the film to the family members who expressed their skepticism about the project. Later, they agreed and talked to him about Azmi. The film focused on Azmi's beginnings and two cases he handled: the 2006 Mumbai train blasts and the 2008 Mumbai terror attacks. Mehta combined several of Azmi's petitions into a single case for "clarity and dramatic impact".

=== Casting ===
Mehta said he was looking for "big stars" for the film, but most were not interested because of his earlier failures. At the time, the film's co-producer Anurag Kashyap suggested he cast Rajkummar Rao thinking he was perfect for the role of Azmi. Later, casting director Mukesh Chhabra sent Rao to Mehta's office. Mehta cast him after a screen test. Mehta felt Rao "surrendered himself completely" to the film. In preparing for the role, Rao met Azmi's family and spent time with them to understand the man and his personality. He also studied the Quran and attended courtrooms to understand how lawyers behave. Rao said he was "emotionally drained" as the character was challenging and complex. In the scenes where he had to cry, Rao said he could not stop himself, thinking about what Azmi had to go through.

Tigmanshu Dhulia, Prabhleen Sandhu, Kay Kay Menon and Mohammed Zeeshan Ayyub played supporting roles in the film. Vivek Ghamande played the role of Faheem Ansari while Baljinder Kaur of Ammi.

=== Filming ===
Shahid was made on a production budget of ₹6.5 million (US$67,000) and filmed in complete secrecy. It was shot in several Mumbai neighbourhoods Azmi had frequented including Kurla, Govandi and Pydhonie. Mehta chose to shoot in the apartment above Azmi's ground floor residence in the Taximen's Colony as he wanted to "capture the sense of claustrophobia and unkemptness of his home". Some portions of the film were shot in Azmi's office and his colony. Shahid was also shot in Nagpada, where Faheem Ansari's wife Yasmin lives. The scenes in the terrorist training camp were shot in Himachal Pradesh.

Mehta decided to depict realistic court scenes based on his team's observation of real courts. They visited the Andheri Court and the Esplanade Court among others, taking photographs to recreate the ambience for the courtroom scenes. Courtroom sets were built because filming in an actual court is not permitted. The scene where Azmi's face is blackened by assailants outside a courtroom was a re-enactment of an incident from Mehta's own life. In 2000, members of Shiv Sena who were protesting against Mehta's drama film Dil Pe Mat Le Yaar!! attacked him and vandalised his office.

The film's unit consisted of about 17 people because of budget and time constraints; it was made on a budget of ₹6.5 million (US$67,000). The film was shot linearly on a non-linear draft. Mehta said it was filmed guerilla style using all "available digital formats without really worrying about which lens was available". The filmmaker used only natural or minimal lighting. For an interrogation scene, Rao suggested Mehta show him naked as he wanted to "feel the embarrassment, the mental pain of the character." The film's editor, Apurva Asrani, edited the film in a linear order as he felt an earlier version was "not working". Mehta ultimately decided to give him a screenplay credit as he felt Asrani "shaped the narrative" of the film.

Shahid was jointly produced by Kashyap, Ronnie Screwvala and Siddharth Roy Kapur under UTV Spotboy, and Sunil Bohra; it would mark Screwvala's penultimate UTV credit as producer and final Hindi film project under UTV to credit (the last being the 2013 Tamil film Ivan Veramathiri). Azmi had defended Kashyap's film Black Friday (2007) in the courts while it was debarred from release by the Central Board of Film Certification. Anuj Dhawan served as the film's director of photography. Mehta said that they had a lot of material they did not use as "not all of it could translate into a scene"; he wanted the film to be more accessible. Azmi's brother Khalid Azmi said of the film's authenticity that "it is 95 percent accurate."

== Release and reception ==
Shahid premiered at the 2012 Toronto International Film Festival in its "City to City" programme in September 2012. The film was screened at several film festivals including the 14th Mumbai Film Festival, the New York Indian Film Festival, the Indian Film Festival of Stuttgart, the Dubai International Film Festival and the Chicago South Asian Film Festival. The film's album soundtrack consisted of just one song titled "Beparwah", sung by Arijit Singh and written by Shellee. The music was composed by Karan Kulkarni. The film's poster, which showed Rao's blackened face, was also released. The official trailer was unveiled on 20 September 2013. The film opened in India on 18 October 2013 around 400 screens. A private screening of the film was held for the cast and crew before its release. Shahid is also available on SonyLiv and Netflix.

=== Box office and awards ===
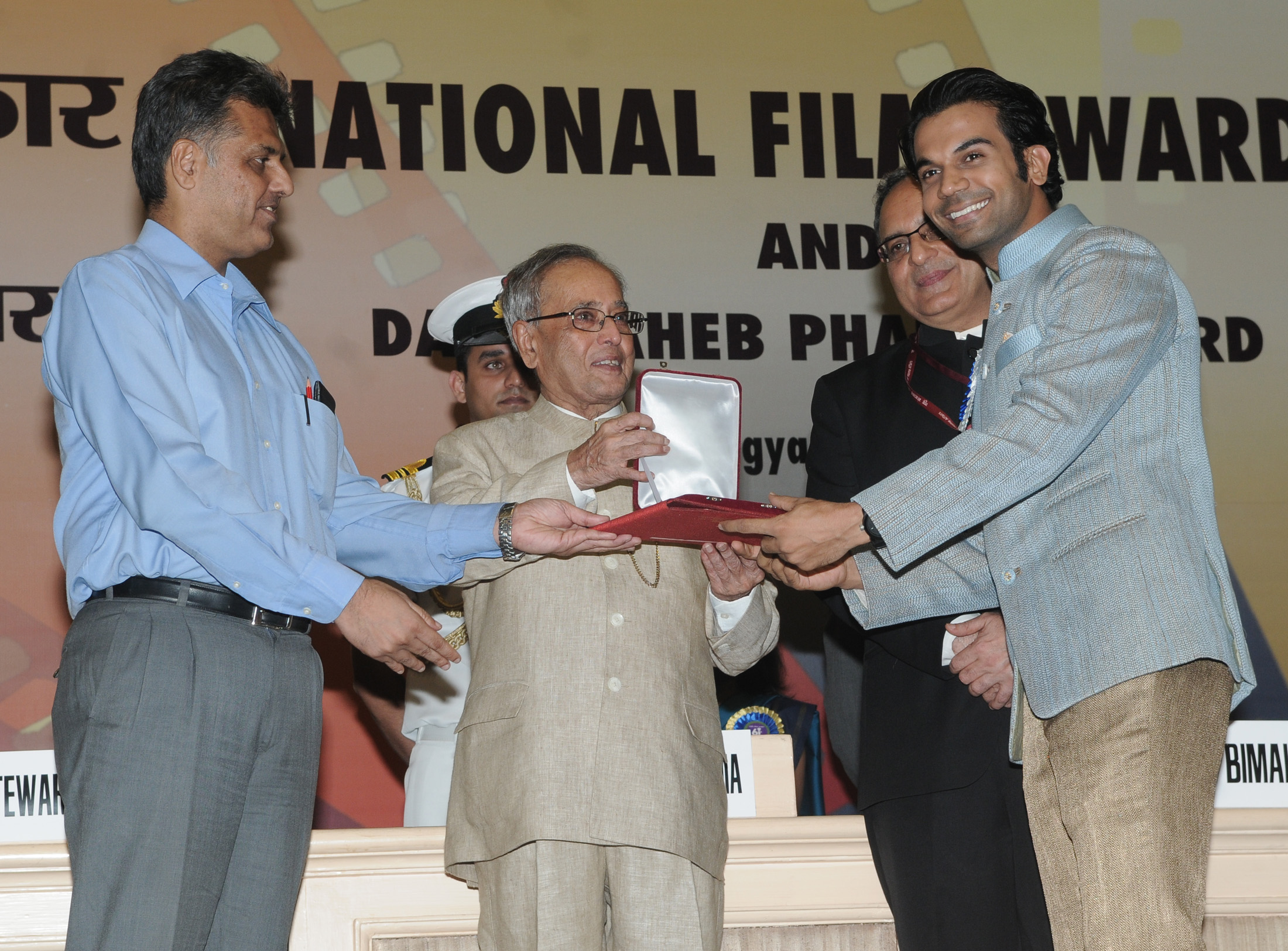
Rao receiving the National Award from the then President of India, Pranab Mukherjee.

Shahid opened to small audiences in theatres and earned a total of ₹4.5 million (US$47,000). It went on to take in ₹20.5 million (US$210,000) at the end of its first weekend. The film performed well with multiplex audiences compared to single screens. It collected ₹3.2 million (US$33,000) on the fifth day, ₹3 million (US$31,000) on the sixth, and ₹2.6 million (US$27,000) seventh day. The film's total box office collection at the end of its theatrical run was ₹36.07 million (US$370,000).

Rao received the Best Actor Award and Mehta the Best Director Award at the 61st National Film Awards ceremony. Rao also won the Filmfare Critics Award for Best Actor at the 59th Filmfare Awards. At the 14th Mumbai International Film Festival, the film won the Silver Gateway trophy and cash prize of ₹500,000 (US$5,200) while Mehta won the Best Director award. Mehta won the Best Director award at the New York Indian Film Festival and at the Indian Film Festival of Stuttgart.

=== Critical response ===
Shahid received mostly positive reviews from the critics with particular praise for Rao's performance. On Rotten Tomatoes, the film has a 100% approval rating based on 6 reviews, with an average rating of 7.7 out of 10. Saibal Chatterjee of NDTV called it a "gritty, gutsy, bold and brave" film that articulates "uncomfortable truths about contemporary India, its media, its judiciary and, of course, its people." Sify's Sonia Chopra gave a positive review, writing that the film "salutes the man who walked a unique path" and does "full justice to the man and his extraordinary life." Rajeev Masand wrote in his review: "The film itself is brave and unflinching, and oozes the kind of sincerity that you long for in most Hindi films." Madhureeta Mukherjee of The Times of India said the film is "brutally honest, brave and above all a fascinating humane story". Trisha of Firstpost believed Mehta's directorial style echoed "Azmi's own commitment to a truth in which thoughtless actions produce victims, rather than villainy producing heroes."

Shubhra Gupta of The Indian Express mentioned in her review that the film "needed to have been made" and Mehta "tells it straight, without any false flourishes". She also praised Rao's performance, saying he "wears the character like skin, and becomes Shahid." India Today's Suhani Singh gave a positive review, writing the film "stops short of hero worship and is a fitting tribute to an inspiring figure." Anupama Chopra praised Rao's performance in the film and called it his "triumph, [..] his Shahid has strength, anguish and a controlled anger, but also real charm." Vinayak Chakravorty of India Today noted it as a "career-defining role" for Rao and the "biggest reason you will love this unusual film." Baradwaj Rangan felt the film was a "deeply humanistic drama" which "makes us think, but more often, it makes us feel." Mid-Day's Shubha Shetty Saha wrote: "Not often do we get the opportunity to watch a relevant movie that depicts the times we live in, with unblinking directness."

Prasanna D Zore of Rediff.com called it a "gutsy and thought-provoking film", she added that it is not an "in your face film": "It is a subtle, thought-provoking and gutsy story of a person who believed in the power of truth and justice yet knew that the path he had taken was strewn with risks, indifference and ignominy." Saurav Datta of Daily News and Analysis opined the film was "incomplete" without showing Azmi's younger brother's role as he took over his job; he felt the film also concluded with an "abrupt, grinding halt". Mint's Sanjukta Sharma called it an "admirable project" and praised Rao's performance but stated the film fell "short of a masterpiece" as a biopic. Namrata Joshi felt that the film "portrays the psyche of the Indian Muslim in the changing, increasingly polarised India with warmth and simplicity." Reuters Shilpa Jamkhandikar responded positively to the film and praised Rao's performance: "As Shahid, Raj Kumar injects the right amount of earnestness, anger and vulnerability into his role, to make this one of the best performances we have seen this year." Journalist and writer Rana Ayyub said that the film was a "brave and worthy tribute to [Azmi's] work and courage."

Among overseas reviewers, Omer M. Mozaffar of RogerEbert.com praised Mehta's direction and called his work a "pleasant surprise": "the lack of polish at first seems like a film school weakness, but grows into a well-crafted asset, especially in his deliberate fades to black." Rachel Saltz of The New York Times gave a positive review writing: "[Mehta] has made a film of conviction that's neither plodding nor preachy." However, Saltz felt the second half of the film was "truncated and overstuffed". Mohammad Kamran Jawaid of Dawn, gave the film a positive review writing that the two-hour time constraint "means there's little room for the traditional expansion we get from biopics, and if at times Shahid feels like an expanded best-of Mr. Azmi's life, it's because it is".

Shahid was mentioned in critic and author Shubhra Gupta's book, 50 Films That Changed Bollywood, 1995–2015.
