= Shahid Azmi =

Indian lawyer (1977–2010)

- Shahid Azmi
- Born: Shahid Azmi; 1977; Deonar, Mumbai, India
- Died: 11 February 2010 (aged 32); Mumbai
- Cause of death: Assassination
- Occupations: Lawyer; Human rights activist

Shahid Azmi (1977 – 11 February 2010) was an Indian lawyer and human rights activist. He is occasionally referred to as "Shaheed Shahid Azmi" – "The Martyr Shahid Azmi" – because of his assassination.

Azmi was accused of crime at a young age; in 1992, aged 15, he was arrested for violence during the 1992 Bombay riots. Let off lightly as a juvenile, and due to lack of any proper evidence against him, as a young adult, he was again arrested, this time under Terrorist and Disruptive Activities (Prevention) Act, for plotting against the state. He spent seven years in Delhi's Tihar Jail. There, he was encouraged to resume his education, and by the time he was released, he had pursued a degree in law. In 2003, he began practising as a criminal defense lawyer in Mumbai. The cases handled by him were almost exclusively of defending cases for those accused of terrorism, who he believed had been jailed as scapegoats. He was shot dead by four assailants in his office in Kurla, Mumbai on 11 February 2010 at the age of 32.

Shahid Azmi was the nephew of Abu Asim Azmi, a Samajwadi Party politician and Member of the Maharashtra Legislative Assembly from the Govandi constituency in Mumbai.

== Background and personal life ==
Azmi was born and brought up in the Deonar suburb of Mumbai, in a Muslim family with origins in Azamgarh, Uttar Pradesh. He was third amongst five brothers. One of his brothers, Khalid Azmi, is also an advocate in Mumbai. Shahid Azmi was married to Maryam of an affluent Assamese descendant whom he later divorced.

== Crimes and imprisonment ==
At age 14, Azmi was arrested (or detained) by Mumbai police for indulging in violence during the 1992 Mumbai communal riots. Since he was a juvenile, he was let off leniently and did not serve time in jail. Subsequently, he crossed over into Pakistan-administered Kashmir, where he spent a brief period at a militant training camp, but soon returned. As he said to The Times of India in an interview, "I had seen policemen killing people from my community. I have witnessed cold-blooded murders. This enraged me and I joined the resistance." In December 1994, he was arrested under the Terrorist and Disruptive Activities (Prevention) Act (now repealed), for an alleged conspiracy to assassinate some politicians and Shiv Sena leader, Bal Thackeray, and given a five-year jail sentence, however in the same year, the Supreme Court acquitted him. In all, he spent seven years at Tihar Jail, Delhi.

It was during his stay at Tihar Jail, that he started his college education, first graduation followed by a postgraduate course in creative writing; once he was acquitted of the charges, he went to study for a law degree (LLM) in Mumbai.

== Career ==
After receiving his degree, he worked with lawyer Majeed Memon for some months, before starting his career as a lawyer in 2003. Soon started picking up cases of Muslims charged under the Prevention of Terrorism Act, 2002 (POTA). Many of the cases were fought pro bono in consultation with NGOs, like Jamiat Ulama-e-Hind. His first major success as a defence lawyer came in the 2002 Ghatkopar bus bombing case, when Arif Paanwala, who was arrested under Prevention of Terrorism Act (POTA) and was named the prime accused, was acquitted along with eight others, due to lack of evidence, by the court; this eventually led to the law being repealed.

Azmi then had represented the accused in the 7/11 Mumbai local train blasts, the 2006 Aurangabad arms haul, the 2006 Malegaon blasts case. Though the High Court had rejected his application challenging the use of the Maharashtra Control of Organised Crime Act (MCOCA) in these alleged terrorism cases and asked for stay, in February 2008, the Supreme Court of India stayed the three trials. In July 2008, Azmi filed a petition in the High Court alleging that the accused in the 7/11 Mumbai blasts, then lodged in the Arthur Road Jail, were being tortured. Responding to the petition, the court ordered an inquiry in the case, and the allegations were found to be true. In his brief career of seven years, he secured 17 acquittals in court.

It was while he was defending Faheem Ansari in the 26/11 attacks case that he was killed. Ansari was acquitted of all the charges by the Supreme Court of India due to lack of evidence on 19 August 2012.

== Death ==
He was killed on 11 February 2010 in his office at Taxi Men colony in Kurla, when four gunmen entered his office and shot two bullets, point blank and fled. Though he was taken to Rajawadi Hospital in Ghatkopar, he was soon declared dead.

== Murder case ==
In February 2010, member of the Bharat Nepali gang, Devendra Babu Jagtap alias JD, Pintoo Deoram Dagale, Vinod Yashwant Vichare and Hasmukh Solanki, were arrested by the police under MCOCA. The police however did not conduct any forensic of the murder weapons and claimed that the murder was "solved" by the arrest of the accused.

Couple of months later, in June 2010, Inder Singh, who was Azmi's peon at the time and the lone eyewitness of the assassination, lodged a complaint alleging receiving a threatening call, which was later traced to Gujarat. On 20 January 2011, MCOCA court dropped the MCOCA charges levelled against the accused in the police chargesheet as it found no evidence suggesting "pecuniary gains were made in the crime, a mandatory aspect for MCOCA charges."

Then in April 2011, while the accused were in a sessions court at Kala Ghoda, for a hearing the police caught a man named Munna reportedly of Navlekar gang, with a weapon and live cartridges in the court premises, who had come allegedly to free the accused.

On 23 July 2012, the Bombay High Court granted bail to one of the accused, Vinod Vichare, against a personal bond of Rs 50,000 stating he was not "shown to be present" during the assassination. Vichare had already spent two years in jail, ever since he was held for the possession of one of the four revolvers given to Bharat Nepali.

== Accusations on the Intelligence Bureau ==
In a 2007 interview with Rediff News Correspondent Sheela Bhatt, Azmi accused the police of staging an encounter at Antop Hill where a Pakistani was killed, because, that area was isolated and "terrorists always hide in places where you find a lot of other people". He further accused the Intelligence Bureau of perpetrating the 2006 Mumbai train bombings, which are otherwise believed to be the work of Lashkar-e-Taiba and Students Islamic Movement of India. When asked as to why Intelligence Bureau would indulge in such acts against national interests, he said it was to stereotype Muslims and lobby for stringent laws.

== In popular culture ==
A biographical film based on his life titled, Shahid (2013) starring Rajkummar Rao, was directed by Hansal Mehta and produced by Anurag Kashyap. The film had its world premiere at the 2012 Toronto International Film Festival's 'City to City' programme in September 2013 and was released on 18 October 2013 in India. The film has a scene in which Mr Azmi's face is blackened by assailants outside the court room. This, admittedly was, just a re-enactment of an incident in the director's own life as against that of Azmi. Furthermore, several petitions filed by Azmi were combined into a single case for dramatic effect in the film.

Gujarat Files, a 2016 book by Rana Ayyub is dedicated to Shahid Azmi along with advocate and activist Mukul Sinha.

== See also ==
- Mukul Sinha
- Rashid Rehman
- Violence against Muslims in independent India
