= 26th Screen Awards =

Indian film awards ceremony in 2019

- Date: 8 December 2019
- Site: Mumbai, India
- Hosted by: Kartik Aaryan; Shahid Kapoor; Varun Sharma; Kiara Advani; Kriti Sanon

Highlights
- Best Film: Gully Boy
- Best Director: Zoya Akhtar (Gully Boy)
- Best Actor: Ranveer Singh (Gully Boy)
- Best Actress: Alia Bhatt (Gully Boy)
- Most awards: Gully Boy (12)

Television coverage
- Network: Star Plus

The 26th Star Screen Awards ceremony honoured the best Indian Hindi-language films released in 2019. The ceremony was held on 2019 and broadcast in India on Star Plus on 2019.

Gully Boy led the ceremony with 6 nominations, followed by Kabir Singh, The Sky Is Pink, and Uri: The Surgical Strike with 5 nominations each.

Gully Boy won 12 awards, including Best Film, Best Director (for Zoya Akhtar), Best Actor (for Ranveer Singh), Best Actress (for Alia Bhatt), and Best Male Debut (for Siddhant Chaturvedi), thus becoming the most-awarded film at the ceremony.

== Winners ==
=== Main awards ===
Best Film	Best Director
Gully Boy; Kabir Singh; Mission Mangal; War; Uri: The Surgical Strike	Zoya Akhtar – Gully Boy; Aditya Dhar – Uri: The Surgical Strike; Jagan Shakti – Mission Mangal; Siddharth Anand – War; Sandeep Vanga – Kabir Singh
Best Actor	Best Actress
Ranveer Singh – Gully Boy as Murad Ahmed; Akshay Kumar – Kesari as Ishar Singh; Akshay Kumar – Mission Mangal as Rakesh Dhawan; Hrithik Roshan – War as Kabir; Shahid Kapoor – Kabir Singh as Dr. Kabir Rajdheer Singh; Vicky Kaushal – Uri: The Surgical Strike as Vihaan Singh Shergill	Alia Bhatt – Gully Boy as Safeena Firdausi; Kangana Ranaut – Manikarnika: The Queen of Jhansi as Rani Lakshmi Bai; Katrina Kaif – Bharat as Kumud Raina; Priyanka Chopra – The Sky Is Pink as Aditi Chaudhary; Taapsee Pannu – Badla as Naina Sethi; Vidya Balan – Mission Mangal as Tara Shinde
Best Supporting Actor	Best Supporting Actress
Gulshan Devaiah – Mard Ko Dard Nahi Hota as Karate Mani / Jimmy; Manoj Pahwa – Article 15 as Bhramadatt Singh; Soham Majumdar – Kabir Singh as Shiva; Varun Sharma – Chhichhore as Gurmeet "Sexa" Singh Dhillon; Vijay Raaz – Dream Girl as Rajpal Kirar; Vijay Varma – Gully Boy as Moeen	Kamini Kaushal – Kabir Singh as Sadhna Kaur "Dadi"; Amrita Singh – Badla as Rani Kaur; Seema Pahwa – Bala as Mausi; Vaani Kapoor – War as Naina; Zaira Wasim – The Sky Is Pink as Aisha Chaudhary
Most Promising Newcomer – Male	Most Promising Newcomer – Female
Siddhant Chaturvedi – Gully Boy as MC Sher; Abhimanyu Dassani – Mard Ko Dard Nahi Hota as Surya; Karan Deol – Pal Pal Dil Ke Paas as Karan Sehgal; Mohit Raina – Uri: The Surgical Strike as Karan Kashyap; Nandish Sandhu – Super 30 as Pranav Kumar; Zaheer Iqbal – Notebook as Kabir Kaul	Sara Ali Khan – Kedarnath as Mandakani "Mukku" Mishra; Ananya Panday – Student of the Year 2 as Shreya Randhawa; Mrunal Thakur – Super 30 as Supriya; Pranutan Bahl – Notebook as Firdaus; Sahher Bambba – Pal Pal Dil Ke Paas as Saher Sethi; Tara Sutaria – Student of the Year 2 as Mridula "Mia" Chawla
Most Promising Debut Director	Best Comedian
Aditya Dhar – Uri: The Surgical Strike; Deva Katta – Prassthanam; Raaj Shaandilyaa – Dream Girl; Tushar Hiranandani – Saand Ki Aankh	Yami Gautam – Bala as Pari Mishra; Akshay Kumar – Housefull 4 as Bala; Ayushmann Khurrana – Dream Girl as Karamveer Singh/Pooja; Kartik Aaryan – Luka Chuppi as Vinod "Guddu" Shukla; Madhuri Dixit – Total Dhamaal as Bindiya "Bindu" Patel

=== Critics' awards ===
Best Film
Article 15 – Anubhav Sinha; Bala – Amar Kaushik; Chhichhore – Nitesh Tiwari; Section 375 – Ajay Bahl; The Sky Is Pink – Shonali Bose
Best Actor	Best Actress
Ayushmann Khurrana – Article 15 & Bala; Akshaye Khanna – Section 375; Farhan Akhtar – The Sky Is Pink; Sushant Singh Rajput – Chhichhore & Sonchiriya	Bhumi Pednekar – Saand Ki Aankh & Tapsee Pannu – Saand Ki Aankh; Bhumi Pednekar – Bala; Priyanka Chopra – The Sky Is Pink; Richa Chadda – Section 375

=== Special awards ===
Lifetime Achievement Award	Star Plus Baat Nayi Award
Prem Chopra	Luka Chuppi
Entertainer of the Year	Fresh Face of the Year
Ranveer Singh – Gully Boy as Murad Ahmed a.k.a. Gully Boy & Shahid Kapoor – Kabir Singh as Kabir Rajdheer Singh	Ananya Panday – Student of the Year 2 as Shreya Randhawa

=== Technical awards ===
Best Music
Gully Boy & Kabir Singh
Best Playback Singer – Male	Best Playback Singer – Female
Sachet Tandon – "Bekhayali" (Kabir Singh)	Shreya Ghoshal & Vaishali Mhade – "Ghar More Pardesiya" (Kalank)
Best Lyrics	Best Production Design
Divine & Ankur Tewari – "Apna Time Aayega" (Gully Boy)	Suzanne Caplan Merwanji – Gully Boy
Best Film Writing (Story and Screenplay)	Best Dialogue
Anubhav Sinha & Gaurav Solanki – Article 15	Vijay Maurya – Gully Boy
Best Editing	Best Cinematography
Aarif Sheikh – War	Jay Oza – Gully Boy
Best Action	Best Choreography
Aditya Dhar – Uri: The Surgical Strike	Remo D'Souza – "First Class" (Kalank)
Best Sound Design	Best Costume Design
Bishwadeep Chatterjee – Uri: The Surgical Strike	Poornamrata Singh – Gully Boy

== Superlatives ==
Films with multiple nominations
Nominations	Film
6	Gully Boy
5	Kabir Singh
5	The Sky Is Pink
5	Uri: The Surgical Strike
4	Bala
4	Mission Mangal
4	War
3	Article 15
3	Chhichhore
3	Dream Girl
3	Saand Ki Aankh
3	Section 375
2	Badla
2	Mard Ko Dard Nahi Hota
2	Notebook
2	Pal Pal Dil Ke Paas
2	Student of the Year 2
2	Super 30

Films with multiple awards
Awards	Film
12	Gully Boy
4	Kabir Singh
3	Article 15
3	Uri: The Surgical Strike
2	Bala
2	Kalank
2	Saand Ki Aankh
