= 65th Filmfare Awards =

2020 awards for Hindi cinema

- 65th Filmfare Awards
- Date: 15 February 2020
- Site: Indira Gandhi Athletic Stadium, Guwahati
- Hosted by: Karan Johar; Vicky Kaushal
- Official website: Filmfare Awards 2020

Highlights
- Best Film: Gully Boy
- Critics Award for Best Film: Article 15 & Sonchiriya
- Most awards: Gully Boy (13)
- Most nominations: Gully Boy (19)

Television coverage
- Network: Colors TV

The 65th Filmfare Awards ceremony, presented by The Times Group, honored the best Indian Hindi-language films of 2019. The ceremony was held on 15 February 2020 in Guwahati and broadcast on Colors TV the following day. This was the first time in six decades that a Filmfare ceremony was held outside Mumbai. Karan Johar and Vicky Kaushal were hosts of the award ceremony.

A curtain raiser ceremony was held in Mumbai on 2 February 2020, which honoured the winners of technical and short film awards. In the same function, the nominations for popular awards were also announced. Actress Neha Dhupia was the host of this ceremony.

Gully Boy led the ceremony with 19 nominations, followed by Uri: The Surgical Strike with 13 nominations, and Article 15 and Sonchiriya with 11 nominations each.

Gully Boy won a record 13 awards, the most awards for a single film in a year, thus breaking the record set by Black (2005) with 11 wins at the 51st Filmfare Awards. Additionally, it also became the second film to win all four acting awards, having been achieved previously 21 years earlier by Kuch Kuch Hota Hai (1998) at the 44th Filmfare Awards.

At age 92, Kamini Kaushal set a record for becoming the oldest nominee of an acting Filmfare Award, receiving a Best Supporting Actress nomination for her performance in Kabir Singh. However, she lost the award to Amruta Subhash who won the award for Gully Boy.

The ceremony proved to be highly controversial, as fans called out Filmfare for snubbing highly acclaimed films like Chhichhore, Kesari and Uri: The Surgical Strike in favor of Gully Boy. Subsequently, when the Filmfare Award for Best Lyricist went to the rap song "Apna Time Aayega" from Gully Boy instead of the patriotic song "Teri Mitti" from Kesari, lyricist Manoj Muntashir expressed his disappointment at the decision on Twitter, pledging not to attend future award ceremonies, and gained support from fans and other musicians alike.

== Winners and nominees ==
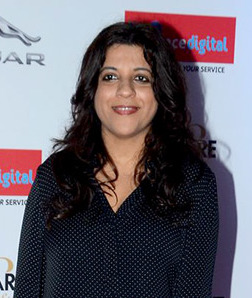
Zoya Akhtar, Best Director

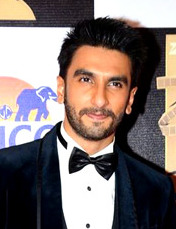
Ranveer Singh, Best Actor

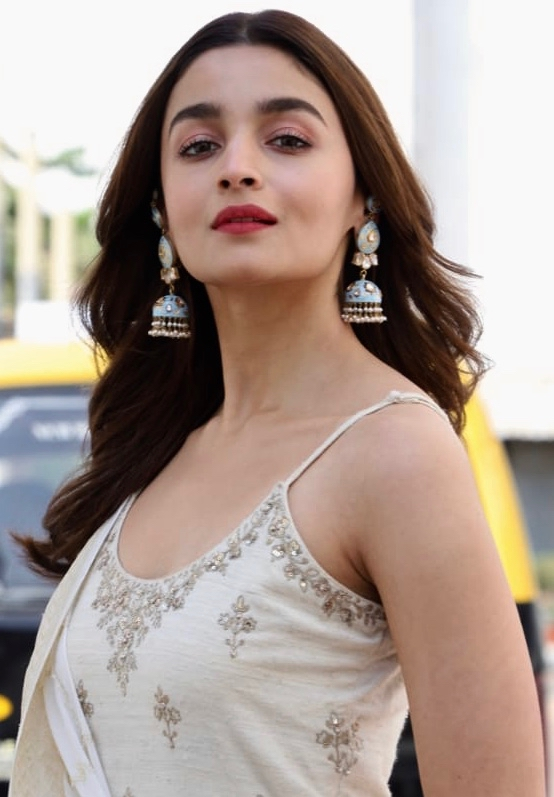
Alia Bhatt, Best Actress

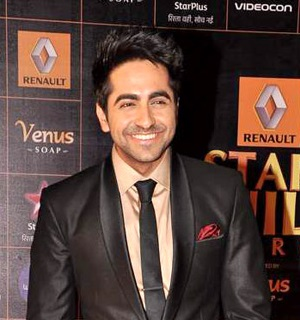
Ayushmann Khurrana, Best Actor Critics

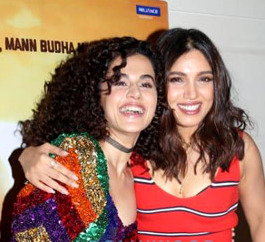
Taapsee Pannu & Bhumi Pednekar, Best Actress Critics

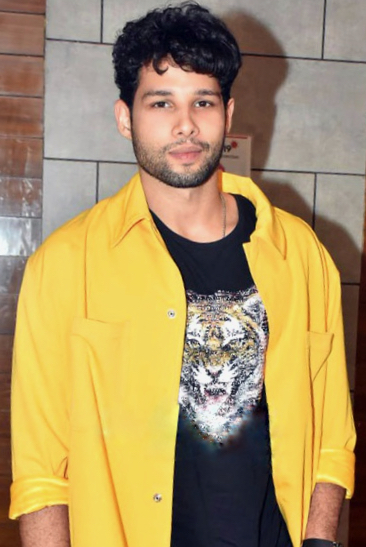
Siddhant Chaturvedi, Best Supporting Actor

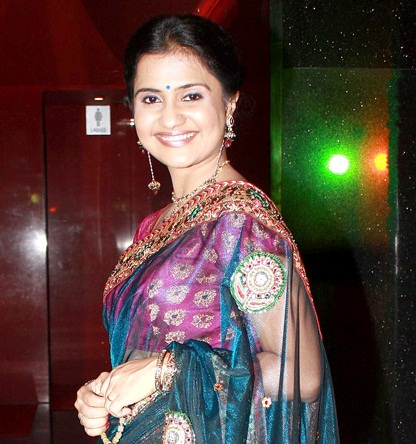
Amruta Subhash, Best Supporting Actress

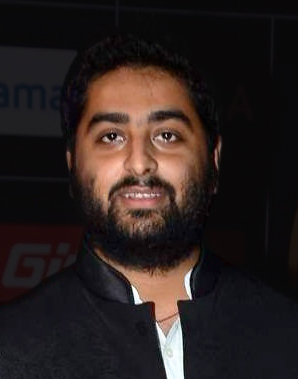
Arijit Singh, Best Male Playback Singer

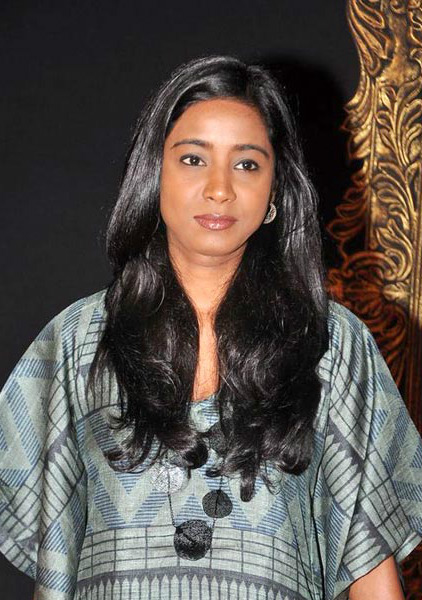
Shilpa Rao, Best Female Playback Singer

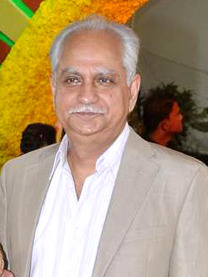
Ramesh Sippy, Lifetime Achievement Awardee

=== Popular awards ===
Best Film		Best Director
Gully Boy – Tiger Baby Films, Excel Entertainment; Chhichhore – Nadiadwala Grandson Entertainment; Mission Mangal – Cape of Good Films, Hope Productions, Fox Star Studios, Aruna Bhatia, Anil Naidu; Uri: The Surgical Strike – RSVP Movies; War – Yash Raj Films		Zoya Akhtar – Gully Boy; Aditya Dhar – Uri: The Surgical Strike; Jagan Shakti – Mission Mangal; Nitesh Tiwari – Chhichhore; Siddharth Anand – War
Best Actor		Best Actress
Ranveer Singh – Gully Boy as Murad Ahmed (Gully Boy); Akshay Kumar – Kesari as Havildar Ishar Singh; Ayushmann Khurrana – Bala as Balmukund "Bala" Shukla; Hrithik Roshan – Super 30 as Anand Kumar; Shahid Kapoor – Kabir Singh as Kabir Singh; Vicky Kaushal – Uri: The Surgical Strike as Major Vihaan Singh Shergill		Alia Bhatt – Gully Boy as Safeena Firdausi; Kangana Ranaut – Manikarnika: The Queen of Jhansi as Rani Lakshmibai; Kareena Kapoor Khan – Good Newwz as Deepti "Deepu" Batra; Priyanka Chopra Jonas – The Sky Is Pink as Aditi Chaudhary; Rani Mukerji – Mardaani 2 as Shivani Shivaji Roy; Vidya Balan – Mission Mangal as Tara Shinde
Best Supporting Actor		Best Supporting Actress
Siddhant Chaturvedi – Gully Boy as Shrikant Bhosle (MC Sher); Diljit Dosanjh – Good Newwz as Honey Batra; Gulshan Devaiah – Mard Ko Dard Nahi Hota as Karate Mani / Jimmy; Manoj Pahwa – Article 15 as Circle Officer Brahmadatt Singh; Ranvir Shorey – Sonchiriya as Vakil Singh; Vijay Varma – Gully Boy as Moeen		Amruta Subhash – Gully Boy as Razia Ahmed; Amrita Singh – Badla as Rani Kaur; Kamini Kaushal – Kabir Singh as Sadhna Kaur (Dadi); Madhuri Dixit – Kalank as Bahaar Begum; Seema Pahwa – Bala as Anara (Mausi); Zaira Wasim – The Sky Is Pink as Aisha Chaudhary
Debut Awards
Best Male Debut	Best Female Debut	Best Debut Director
Abhimanyu Dassani – Mard Ko Dard Nahi Hota as Surya Sampat; Meezaan Jaffrey – Malaal as Shiva More; Siddhant Chaturvedi – Gully Boy as Shrikant Bhosle (MC Sher); Vardhan Puri – Yeh Saali Aashiqui as Sahil Mehra; Vishal Jethwa – Mardaani 2 as Shiv "Sunny" Prasad Yadav; Zaheer Iqbal – Notebook as Kabir Kaul	Ananya Panday – Student of the Year 2 as Shreya Randhawa and Pati Patni Aur Woh as Tapasya Singh; Pranutan Bahl – Notebook as Firdaus Quadri; Saiee Manjrekar – Dabangg 3 as Khushi; Sharmin Sehgal – Malaal as Astha Tripathi; Shivaleeka Oberoi – Yeh Saali Aashiqui as Mitee Deora; Tara Sutaria – Student of the Year 2 as Mridula "Mia" Chawla	Aditya Dhar – Uri: The Surgical Strike; Gopi Puthran – Mardaani 2; Jagan Shakti – Mission Mangal; Raaj Shaandilyaa – Dream Girl; Raj Mehta – Good Newwz; Tushar Hiranandani – Saand Ki Aankh
Writing Awards
Best Story	Best Screenplay	Best Dialogue
Anubhav Sinha, Gaurav Solanki – Article 15; Abhishek Chaubey, Sudip Sharma – Sonchiriya; Jagan Shakti – Mission Mangal; Nitesh Tiwari, Piyush Gupta and Nikhil Mehrotra – Chhichhore; Vasan Bala – Mard Ko Dard Nahi Hota; Zoya Akhtar, Reema Kagti – Gully Boy	Zoya Akhtar, Reema Kagti – Gully Boy; Anubhav Sinha, Gaurav Solanki – Article 15; Balwinder Singh Janjua – Saand Ki Aankh; Jagan Shakti, R Balki, Dharma, Nidhi Singh, Saket Kodiparthi – Mission Mangal; Manish Gupta, Ajay Bahl – Section 375; Sudip Sharma – Sonchiriya	Vijay Maurya – Gully Boy; Anubhav Sinha, Gaurav Solanki – Article 15; Niren Bhatt – Bala; Nitesh Tiwari, Nikhil Mehrotra, Piyush Gupta – Chhichhore; Sanjeev Datta – Super 30; Sudip Sharma – Sonchiriya
Music Awards
Best Music Director		Best Lyricist
Amaal Malik, Mithoon, Vishal Mishra, Sachet–Parampara, Akhil Sachdeva – Kabir Singh; Zoya Akhtar, Ankur Tewari – Gully Boy; Arko Pravo Mukherjee, Tanishk Bagchi, Jasbir Jassi, Chirantan Bhatt, Gurmoh, Jasleen Royal – Kesari; Pritam – Kalank; Vishal–Shekhar – Bharat		Divine, Ankur Tewari – "Apna Time Aayega" – Gully Boy; Amitabh Bhattacharya – "Kalank" – Kalank; Irshad Kamil – "Bekhayali" – Kabir Singh; Manoj Muntashir – "Teri Mitti" – Kesari; Mithoon – "Tujhe Kitna Chahne Lage" – Kabir Singh; Tanishk Bagchi – "Ve Maahi" – Kesari
Best Playback Singer – Male		Best Playback Singer – Female
Arijit Singh – "Kalank" – Kalank; Arijit Singh – "Ve Maahi" – Kesari; B Praak – "Teri Mitti" – Kesari; Nakash Aziz – "Slow Motion" – Bharat; Sachet Tandon – "Bekhayali" – Kabir Singh		Shilpa Rao – "Ghungroo" – War; Neha Bhasin – "Chashni" – Bharat; Parampara Thakur – "Mere Sohneya" – Kabir Singh; Shreya Ghoshal – "Ye Aaina" – Kabir Singh; Shreya Ghoshal, Vaishali Mhade – "Ghar More Pardesiya" – Kalank; Sona Mohapatra, Jyotica Tangri – "Baby Gold" – Saand Ki Aankh

=== Critics' awards ===
Best Film (Best Director)
Article 15 – Anubhav Sinha; Sonchiriya – Abhishek Chaubey; Mard Ko Dard Nahi Hota – Vasant Bala; Photograph – Ritesh Batra; The Sky Is Pink – Shonali Bose
Best Actor	Best Actress
Ayushmann Khurrana – Article 15 as IPS Ayan Ranjan; Akshaye Khanna – Section 375 as Tarun Saluja; Nawazuddin Siddiqui – Photograph as Rafiullah "Rafi"; Rajkummar Rao – Judgementall Hai Kya as Keshav	Bhumi Pednekar – Saand Ki Aankh as Chandro Tomar; Taapsee Pannu – Saand Ki Aankh as Prakashi Tomar; Bhumi Pednekar – Sonchiriya as Indumati Tomar; Kangana Ranaut – Judgementall Hai Kya as Bobby; Radhika Madan – Mard Ko Dard Nahi Hota as Supriya 'Supri'; Sanya Malhotra – Photograph as Miloni Shah

=== Special awards ===
Excellence in Indian Cinema Award
- Govinda
30 Years of Outstanding Contribution to Bollywood Fashion
- Manish Malhotra

Filmfare Lifetime Achievement Award

- Ramesh Sippy

Filmfare R. D. Burman Award

- Sashwat Sachdev

=== Technical awards ===
Nominations for the Technical awards were announced on 31 January 2020 and the winners were subsequently awarded on 2 February 2020.

Best Editing		Best Production Design
Shivkumar V Panicker – Uri: The Surgical Strike; Yasha Ramchandani – Article 15; Monisha R Baldawa – Badla; Charu Shree Roy – Chhichhore; Nitin Baid – Gully Boy		Suzanne Caplan Merwanji – Gully Boy; Nikhil Kovale – Article 15; Ravi Shrivastav – Judgementall Hai Kya; Subrata Chakraborty, Amit Ray – Kesari; Rita Ghosh – Sonchiriya; Aditya Kanwar – Uri: The Surgical Strike
Best Choreography		Best Cinematography
Remo D'Souza – "Ghar More Pardesiya" – Kalank; Ganesh Acharya – "Basanti No Dance" – Super 30; Bosco–Caesar – "Jai Jai Shiv Shankar" – War; Bosco–Caesar and Tushar Kalia – "Ghungroo" – War; Saroj Khan and Remo D'Souza – "Tabaah Ho Gaye" – Kalank		Jay Oza – Gully Boy; Ewan Mulligan – Article 15; Pankaj Kumar – Judgementall Hai Kya; Jay I. Patel – Mard Ko Dard Nahi Hota; Anuj Rakesh Dhawan – Sonchiriya; Mitesh Mirchandani – Uri: The Surgical Strike
Best Sound Design		Best Background Score
Bishwadeep Dipak Chatterjee and Nihar Ranjan Samal – Uri: The Surgical Strike; Kaamod L Kharade – Article 15; Anirban Sengupta – Badla; Ayush Ahuja – Gully Boy; Pritam Das – Saand Ki Aankh; Kunal Sharma – Sonchiriya		Karsh Kale and The Salvage Audio Collective – Gully Boy; Mangesh Dhakde – Article 15; Clinton Cerejo – Badla; Daniel B George – Judgementall Hai Kya; Karan Kulkarni – Mard Ko Dard Nahi Hota; Shashwat Sachdev – Uri: The Surgical Strike
Best Costume Design	Best Action	Best Special Effects
Divya Gambhir, Nidhi Gambhir – Sonchiriya; Arjun Bhasin and Poornamrita Singh – Gully Boy; Sheetal Sharma – Judgementall Hai Kya; Maxima Basu – Laal Kaptaan; Neeta Lulla – Manikarnika: The Queen of Jhansi; Niharika Bhasin – Photograph	Paul Jennings, Oh Sea Young, Parvez Shaikh and Franz Spilhaus – War; Andy Long Stunt Team (UK), Allan Amin, Dr. K Ravi Varma – Commando 3; Parvez Shaikh and Lawrence Woodward – Kesari; Eric Jacobus, Anand Shetty – Mard Ko Dard Nahi Hota; Abbas Ali Moghul – Panipat; Anton Moon & Sunil Rodrigues – Sonchiriya; Stefan Richter – Uri: The Surgical Strike	Sherry Bharda And Vishal Anand For YFX – War; AGPPL VFX – Panipat; Lavan Prakashan, Kushan Prakashan (Digital Turbo Media) – Mard Ko Dard Nahi Hota; YRF Studio – Uri: The Surgical Strike

=== Short Film awards ===
Winners for the short film awards were announced on 2 February 2020.

Best Short Film
Fiction	Non-fiction	People's Choice
Shazia Iqbal – Bebaak	Ananth Narayan Mahadevan – Village of a Lesser God	Deshi
Best Actor – Male (Short Film)		Best Actor – Female (Short Film)
Rajesh Sharma – Tindey		Sarah Hashmi – Bebaak

== Controversy ==
Gully Boy attracted controversy over its 13 wins at the 65th Filmfare Awards. Several Twitter users and fans were extremely disappointed and made calls to boycott the awards, with #BoycottFilmfare trending on the micro-blogging site. While many thought that the film was a deserving winner, others were unhappy and even termed the awards as "snub fare", calling it a move to "justify sending it as a nomination for the Oscars". Subsequently, when the Best Lyricist went to the rap song "Apna Time Aayega" instead of the patriotic song "Teri Mitti" from the 2019 war film Kesari, lyricist Manoj Muntashir tweeted his disappointment at the decision, pledging not to attend future award ceremonies, and gained support from fans and other musicians alike.

== Superlatives ==
Multiple nominations
Nominations	Film
19	Gully Boy
13	Uri: The Surgical Strike
11	Article 15
11	Sonchiriya
9	Kabir Singh
9	Mard Ko Dard Nahi Hota
7	Kalank
7	Kesari
7	War
6	Judgementall Hai Kya
6	Mission Mangal
6	Saand Ki Aankh
5	Chhichhore
4	Badla
4	Photograph
3	Bharat
3	Bala
3	Good Newwz
3	Mardaani 2
3	Super 30
3	The Sky Is Pink
2
2	Manikarnika: The Queen of Jhansi
2	Yeh Saali Aashiqui
2	Panipat
2	Student of the Year 2

Multiple wins
Awards	Film
13	Gully Boy
3	Article 15
3	Uri: The Surgical Strike
3	War
2	Kalank
2	Sonchiriya

== See also ==
- Filmfare Awards
- List of Bollywood films of 2019
