= Abhimanyu Dassani =

Indian actor (born 1990)

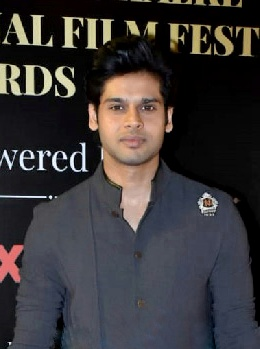
- Dassani in 2022
- Born: 21 February 1990 (age 36); Mumbai, Maharashtra, India
- Occupation: Actor
- Years active: 2018–present
- Parent: Bhagyashree (mother)

Abhimanyu Dassani (born 21 February 1990) is an Indian actor who works in Hindi films. The son of actress Bhagyashree, he made his acting debut in 2018 with the action film Mard Ko Dard Nahi Hota, for which he won Filmfare Award for Best Male Debut. He has since starred in the romantic comedy Meenakshi Sundareshwar (2021) and the action film Nikamma (2022).

== Early life and work ==
Dassani was born on 21 February 1990 in Mumbai, to film actress Bhagyashree and her husband Himalaya Dassani. His father, from a Sindhi business family, has himself been an actor and producer. His younger sister Avantika Dassani is also an actress and made her debut with the web-series Mithya.

Dassani went on to study at the New York Film Academy and Lee Strasberg Theatre and Film Institute. He also practices martial arts and is trained in taekwondo and karate. He started his career by being an assistant to director Rohan Sippy on Dum Maaro Dum and Nautanki Saala!.

== Career ==
Dassani made his feature film debut with Vasan Bala's action-comedy Mard Ko Dard Nahi Hota opposite Radhika Madan. Dassani played a man who does not feel any pain. He performed all the stunts himself. He broke a finger and dislocated his shoulder while filming. Pradeep Menon of Firstpost said "he occupies the screen well" and noted that "his look suits the character of a guy who has not had enough meaningful interactions with the real world". Raja Sen of Hindustan Times wrote, "Dassani is perfect as Surya, making an impressively limber debut with a stoic curiosity — with the blankness appropriate for someone who doesn’t know physical pain." He won the Filmfare Award for Best Male Debut for his performance.

Dassani next played the male lead in the 2021 romantic-comedy Meenakshi Sundareshwar opposite Sanya Malhotra, which released on Netflix. The film received criticism for its stereotypical representation of Tamil people and received mixed reviews. Sukanya Verma of Rediff.com noted, "Abhimanyu is just the man to play Sundaram embodying what a sincere heart and heartfelt apology cannot achieve."

Dassani starred in the 2022 film Nikamma with Shilpa Shetty and Shirley Setia. The film saw him as an unemployed person and received negative reviews. Saibal Chatterjee of NDTV stated, "The young actor does have potential but he needs to be far more judicious with his choice of roles. Here, he struggles to rise above the script." Dassani appeared in a cameo in Monica, O My Darling, the same year. In 2023, he did a cameo in Kisi Ka Bhai Kisi Ki Jaan, alongside his parents.

Dassani starred in the comedy-drama Aankh Micholi with an ensemble cast alongside Mrunal Thakur and in the comedy Nausikhiye with Amol Parashar and Shreya Dhanwanthary.

== Filmography ==
=== Films ===
Key
†	Denotes films that have not yet been released

Year	Title	Role	Notes	Ref.
2011	Dum Maaro Dum	—N/a	Assistant director	
2013	Nautanki Saala!	—N/a	Assistant director	
2018	Mard Ko Dard Nahi Hota	Suryaanshu "Surya" Sampat		
2021	Meenakshi Sundareshwar	Sundareshwar		
2022	Nikamma	Aditya "Adi" Singh		
2022	Monica, O My Darling	Suryaanshu "Surya" Sampat	Cameo appearance	
2023	Kisi Ka Bhai Kisi Ki Jaan	Himself	Cameo appearance	
2023	Aankh Micholi	Rohit Patel		
2024	Jigra	Himself	Cameo appearance	
TBA	Nausikhiye †	TBA	Completed	

=== Music video appearances ===
Year	Title	Singer(s)	Ref.
2022	"Kudi Meri"	Yash Narvekar, Dhvani Bhanushali, Lijo George	
2025	"Bas Tera Hoon"	Asees Kaur, Abhijeet Shrivastava	

== Awards and nominations ==
Year	Award	Category	Work	Result	Ref.
2020	65th Filmfare Awards	Best Male Debut	Mard Ko Dard Nahi Hota	Won	
2020	21st IIFA Awards	Star Debut of the Year – Male	Mard Ko Dard Nahi Hota	Won	
2020	26th Screen Awards	Most Promising Newcomer – Male	Mard Ko Dard Nahi Hota	Nominated	
2020	20th Zee Cine Awards	Best Male Debut	Mard Ko Dard Nahi Hota	Nominated	
2022	Pinkvilla Style Icons Awards	Super Stylish Emerging Talent – Male	—N/a	Won	
2022	3rd Filmfare OTT Awards	Best Actor Male – Web Original Film	Meenakshi Sundareshwar	Nominated	
