= Bhagyashree =

Indian actress (born 1969)

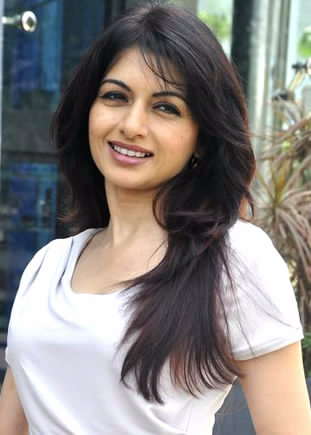
- Bhagyashree in 2012
- Born: Bhagyashree Patwardhan; 23 February 1969 (age 57); Sangli, Maharashtra, India
- Occupation: Actress
- Years active: 1987–present
- Spouse: Himalaya Dassani (m. 1989)
- Children: 2, including Abhimanyu Dassani
- Website: bhagyashreeonline.com

Bhagyashree Dassani (née Patwardhan; born 23 February 1969), known mononymously as Bhagyashree, is an Indian actress. Her breakthrough came with starring in Maine Pyar Kiya (1989), earning national recognition and the Filmfare Award for Best Female Debut. Afterwards, she decreased her workload to focus on her marriage and two children.

Following a period of sporadic work, Bhagyashree was nominated for the Indian Television Academy Award for GR8! Performer Female for her performance in Laut Aao Trisha (2014–2015). She appeared in the big-budget films Thalaivii (2021), Radhe Shyam (2022), and Kisi Ka Bhai Kisi Ki Jaan (2023), before experiencing a commercial resurgence with Raja Shivaji (2026).

== Early life ==
Bhagyashree is from the Marathi royal family of Sangli in Maharashtra. She is the great granddaughter of Chintamanrao Dhundirao Patwardhan, the last ruling Raja of the princely state of Sangli during the British Raj in India. Her father, Vijay Singhrao Madhavrao Patwardhan, is the titular Raja of Sangli. She is the eldest of three daughters, the other two being Madhuvanti and Purnima.

== Career ==
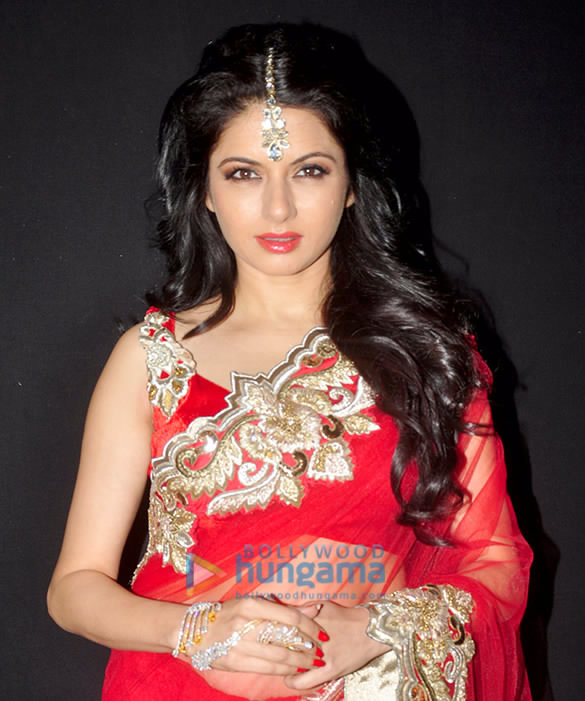
Bhagyashree in 2015

She started her acting career with the 1987 television serial Kachchi Dhoop, which was based on Louisa May Alcott's Little Women. She was approached to act in the serial by Amol Palekar, a renowned actor-director who offered her the role as the original actress had abandoned the project abruptly.

She made her film debut in the 1989 commercially successful Hindi film Maine Pyar Kiya, starring alongside Salman Khan where she played Suman. This remains her most successful and best known film to date, for which she won the Filmfare Award for Best Female Debut. After marriage to Himalaya Dassani in 1990, she acted in three films: Peepat's Qaid Main Hai Bulbul, K.C. Bokadia's Tyagi and Mahendra Shah's Paayal, all opposite her husband in 1992. She also acted with Avinash Wadhawan in Ghar Aaya Mera Pardesi in 1993. This was her last Hindi film in the 1990s and she went on to appear in a few Tamil, Kannada and Telugu films. She made her Telugu debut in the film Yuvaratna Rana (1998). She also appeared in episodes of the television series CID and Kabhie Kabhie.

She returned to Hindi films in the mid-2000s appearing in Maa Santoshi Maa (2003), Humko Deewana Kar Gaye (2006) and Red Alert: The War Within (2010). After a gap of several years, she made her comeback to television with the TV serial Laut Aao Trisha aired on Life OK from 2014 to 2015. In 2019, she appeared in the Kannada film Seetharama Kalyana. She is set to return to Telugu films with the Telugu remake of the 2014 Hindi film 2 States.

In 2021, she appeared in the bilingual releases Thalaivi and Radhe Shyam.

In February 2022, she entered as a contestant in StarPlus's Smart Jodi with her husband, Himalaya Dasani.

In 2023, she made a cameo appearance in Kisi Ka Bhai Kisi Ki Jaan, where she reunited with her first co-star Salman Khan after 34 years. Her husband and son also made cameos alongside her.

=== Other ventures ===
In addition to acting in films, she has been engaged in various philanthropic activities. In March 2015, Bhagyashree became brand ambassador of the Bhagyashree Scheme, launched by the Government of Maharashtra. Bhagyashree Scheme caters to girl child from below poverty line families.

== Personal life ==
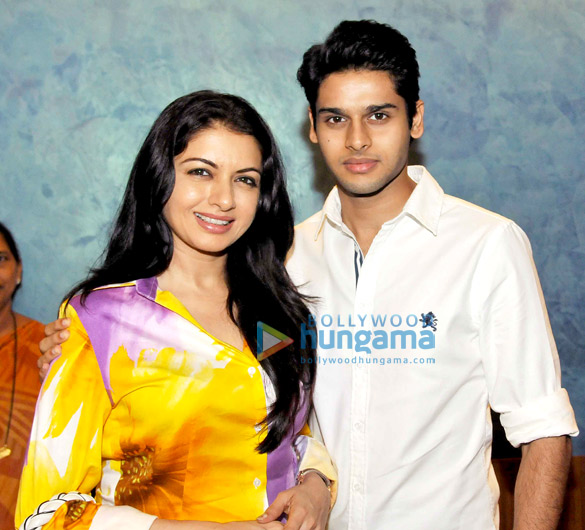
Bhagyashree with her son, Abhimanyu Dassani, in 2014

Bhagyashree married Himalaya Dasani on 19 January 1989. They have two children, a son and a daughter. Her son, Abhimanyu Dasani, won the Filmfare Award for Best Male Debut for his performance in the 2019 film Mard Ko Dard Nahi Hota. Her daughter, Avantika Dassani, debuted with the web-series Mithya.

== Filmography ==
=== Film ===
Key
| † | Denotes films that have not yet been released |

| Year | Film | Role | Language | Notes |
|---|---|---|---|---|
| 1989 | Maine Pyar Kiya | Suman | Hindi | Debut Film; Won–Filmfare Award for Best Female Debut; Nominated–Filmfare Best Actress Award |
| 1992 | Qaid Mein Hai Bulbul | Pooja Choudhary | Hindi | |
| 1992 | Tyagi | Aarati Shakti Dayal | Hindi | |
| 1992 | Paayal | Paayal | Hindi | |
| 1993 | Ghar Aaya Mera Pardesi | Roopa | Hindi | |
| 1997 | Ammavra Ganda | Rani | Kannada | Kannada Debut |
| 1997 | Omkaram | Shashi | Telugu | Telugu Debut |
| 1998 | Yuvaratna Rana | Dr. Kasthuri | Telugu | |
| 2002 | Shotru Dhongsho | Varsha / Urmi | Bengali | Bengali Debut |
| 2003 | Maa Santoshi Maa | | Hindi | |
| 2003 | Avuna | | Telugu | Special appearance |
| 2006 | Uthaile Ghoonghta Chand Dekhle | | Bhojpuri | Bhojpuri Debut |
| 2006 | Humko Deewana Kar Gaye | Simran Kohli | Hindi | Special appearance |
| 2006 | Janani | Akanksha | Hindi | |
| 2006 | Gandugali Kumara Rama | | Kannada | |
| 2007 | Janam Janam Ke Saath | Jyoti | Bhojpuri | |
| 2007 | Mumbai Aamchich | | Marathi | Marathi Debut |
| 2008 | Ego Chumma Dede Raja Ji | Meena | Bhojpuri | |
| 2009 | Zhak Marli Bayko Keli | Asmita | Marathi | |
| 2010 | Sati Behula | Savitri | Bengali | |
| 2010 | Red Alert: The War Within | Uma | Hindi | |
| 2013 | Deva | | Bhojpuri | |
| 2019 | Seetharama Kalyana | Meera | Kannada | |
| 2021 | Thalaivii | Sandhya | Tamil | Bilingual film |
| 2021 | Thalaivii | Sandhya | Hindi | Bilingual film |
| 2022 | Radhe Shyam | Girija Rani | Telugu | Bilingual film |
| 2022 | Radhe Shyam | Girija Rani | Hindi | Bilingual film |
| 2023 | Kisi Ka Bhai Kisi Ki Jaan | Bhagya | Hindi | Special appearance |
| 2023 | NRI Wives | Ayesha | Hindi | |
| 2023 | Chatrapathi | Parvati | Hindi | |
| 2023 | Sajini Shinde Ka Viral Video | Kalyani | Hindi | |
| 2026 | Raja Shivaji | Jijabai | Marathi; Hindi | Bilingual film |
| 2026 | The Great Grand Superhero: Aliens Ka Aagman | | Hindi | |

=== Television ===
| Year | Serial | Role |
|---|---|---|
| 1987 | Kachchi Dhoop | Alka |
| 1996–1997 | Aandhi Jazbaaton Ki | |
| 1998–1999 | Jaan | Radha |
| 2000 | Smriti | Sandhya Raj Dhanrajgir |
| 2001 | Sambandh | Dr. Devaki |
| 2001 | C.I.D. | Nupur |
| | Ujala | Anuradha Chopra |
| 2002–2003 | Kaagaz Ki Kashti | Aarati |
| 2003 | Kabhie Kabhie | |
| 2014–2015 | Laut Aao Trisha | Amrita Prateek Swaika |
| 2022 | Smart Jodi | Herself as contestant |
| 2024 | Life Hill Gayi | Guest appearance |
