= Paayal =

- Directed by: Mahendra Shah
- Written by: Rumi Jaffery; Roopa Shah
- Produced by: Mahendra Shah
- Starring: Himalaya; Bhagyashree; Farida Jalal; Annu Kapoor
- Cinematography: Rajesh Patni
- Edited by: A. Muthu
- Music by: Nadeem-Shravan
- Production company: Roopa Films
- Release date: July 17, 1992

Paayal is a 1992 Bollywood film starring Bhagyashree along with her real life husband Himalaya Dasani. She plays a spoilt brat of a rich father. It was an uncredited adaptation of Malayalam movie Nokkethadhoorathu Kannum Nattu (1984).

== Cast ==
- Bhagyashree as Paayal
- Himalaya as Arjun
- Farida Jalal as Shanti devi
- Shakti Kapoor as Dr.Shakti Kapoor
- Raju Shrestha as Kaalia
- Annu Kapoor as Pardesi
- Tiku Talsania as Uncle

== Soundtrack ==
The music of the film was composed Nadeem-Shravan and the lyrics were penned by Sameer.

#	Title	Singer(s)
1.	"Meri Duniya Mein Aana"	Kumar Sanu, Sadhana Sargam
2.	"Mere Mehboob Meri Jane"	Kumar Sanu, Sadhana Sargam
3.	"Tera Hi Pyar Mere Is Dil"	Kumar Sanu, Alka Yagnik
4.	"Mujhko Paayal Naam Diya"	Sarika Kapoor, Vicky-Dubc
5.	"Mere Mehboob" (Sad)	Kumar Sanu
6.	"Tujhko Paayal Naam Diya"	Sadhana Sargam
7.	"Meri Duniya Mein Aana" (Sad)	Sadhana Sargam
8.	"Mohabbat Na Karna"	Kumar Sanu, Sadhana Sargam
