= Photograph (film) =

2019 Indian film by Ritesh Batra

- Theatrical release poster
- Directed by: Ritesh Batra
- Produced by: Ritesh Batra; Viola Fügen; Neil Kopp; Michel Merkt; Vincent Savino; Anish Savjani; Michael Weber
- Starring: Nawazuddin Siddiqui; Sanya Malhotra
- Cinematography: Tim Gillis; Ben Kutchins
- Edited by: John F. Lyons
- Music by: Peter Raeburn
- Production companies: The Match Factory; Poetic License Motion Pictures; Filmscience; DAR Motion Pictures
- Distributed by: AA Films (India); Amazon Studios (United States, India and Japan); NFP Marketing and Distribution (Germany)
- Release dates: 27 January 2019 (Sundance); 15 March 2019 (India); 17 May 2019 (United States)
- Running time: 108 minutes
- Countries: India; Germany; United States
- Languages: Hindi; English
- Box office: est. ₹1.29 crore (India)

Photograph is a 2019 Indian romantic drama film written, co-produced and directed by Ritesh Batra. It stars Nawazuddin Siddiqui and Sanya Malhotra in the lead roles. The film follows a street photographer Rafi (Siddiqui), who tries to convince Miloni (Malhotra) to pose as his fiancée so that his grandmother stops pressuring him to get married.

Photograph had its world premiere at the 2019 Sundance Film Festival and the European premiere at the 69th Berlin International Film Festival. Initially scheduled to release in India on 8 March 2019, it finally released on 15 March to positive reviews from critics. It released in several countries including the United Kingdom, United States, Spain, France and Australia later in summer.

== Plot ==
The plot revolves around a struggling street photographer Rafi, based in Mumbai, who works day and night to pay off an old family debt. His grandmother wishes to see him married and constantly pressures him to find a suitable match. He convinces his grandmother that he has already found someone by showing her a picture of a shy stranger, Miloni. When Rafi's grandmother further prods to introduce her to his fiancé, he tracks down Miloni, a student belonging to a middle-class family. Rafi convinces her to fake their relationship, to which Miloni readily agrees. Despite the difference in their ages, culture, status and economic background, the two form a unique bond. The film is a love letter to Mumbai, bringing the city out as a character sheltering the two protagonists and their extraordinary journey.

== Cast ==
- Nawazuddin Siddiqui as Rafiullah "Rafi"
- Sanya Malhotra as Miloni Shah/Noorie
- Farrukh Jaffar as Dadi, Rafi's grandmother
- Ramesh Deo as Dr. Kher
- Geetanjali Kulkarni as Rampyaari, Miloni's househelp
- Sachin Khedekar as Kantibhai Shah, Miloni's father
- Lubna Salim as Sheilaben Shah, Miloni's mother
- Vijay Raaz as Tiwari's ghost
- Jim Sarbh as Anmol Sir, Miloni's teacher
- Brinda Trivedi as Saloni
- Denzil Smith as Hasmukhbhai
- Virendra Saxena as Beverage vendor
- Akash Sinha as Banke
- Saharsh Kumar Shukla as Zakir Bhai
- Shree Dhar Dubey as Raghu
- Amarjeet Singh as Bilal
- Ashok Pathak as Gopal Taxi driver

== Production ==
Photograph was filmed on several locations in Mumbai. The shooting was finished in November 2017.

The film also features the song "Tum Ne Mujhe Dekha" by R. D. Burman and Mohammed Rafi from Teesri Manzil (1966).

== Marketing and release ==
Photograph was selected in Berlinale Special section of the 69th Berlin International Film Festival. The film was screened on 14 February 2019 for its European premiere at the festival. The film was released in India on 15 March 2019 as announced with a new official poster unveiled on 14 February 2019. Amazon Studios released the film in the United States on 17 May 2019.

=== Home video ===
Photograph was made available as VOD on Amazon Prime Video in May 2019.

== Reception ==
=== Critical response ===
On review aggregator website Rotten Tomatoes, the film holds an approval rating of 79% based on 91 reviews, with an average rating of 6.5/10. The website's critics' consensus reads, "Photograph enriches the familiar arc of its love story by refreshingly refracting its characters' budding bond through a sociocultural prism." Anupama Chopra of Film Companion gives 3 stars out of 5 and finds the film tender, meditative, and poetic. She says, "The film is so quiet and so still in some parts, that you will get impatient. But it is evocative and its tenderness will stay with you." Guy Lodge of Variety said that the film "has the same quiet streak of wistful sentimentality that made The Lunchbox (2013) so globally beloved — and, for that matter, the same softly-softly humanity found in his two subsequent English-language efforts." Caryn James of The Hollywood Reporter called it a "nuanced, slow-burn, will-they-or-won't-they romance" and noted that Batra "turns a story that sounds tired and goofy into a lovely film with a tone of tender sadness."

Fionnuala Halligan of Screen International noted that the film's "deliberate pace does bring some rich rewards for the patient viewer, while a lovely ending feels like a throwback to the old-fashioned big-screen romances of yore." Rahul Desai of Film Companion praised Malhotra's performance and wrote: "The reason Photograph really works, despite an airy premise, is the character of Miloni, and especially Sanya Malhotra’s evolved performance." Prahlad Srihari of Firstpost felt that the film "fails to replicate The Lunchbox's magic and called it a "slow-paced dramedy that can't quite transcend its clever setup."

=== Awards and nominations ===
List of awards and nominations
Award	Date of ceremony	Category	Recipient(s)	Result	Ref(s)
Filmfare Awards	15 February 2020	Best Film (Critics)	Ritesh Batra	Nominated	
Filmfare Awards	15 February 2020	Best Actor (Critics)	Nawazuddin Siddiqui	Nominated	
Filmfare Awards	15 February 2020	Best Actress (Critics)	Sanya Malhotra	Nominated	
Filmfare Awards	15 February 2020	Best Costume Design	Niharika Khan	Nominated	
