= Sanya Malhotra =

Indian actress (born 1992)

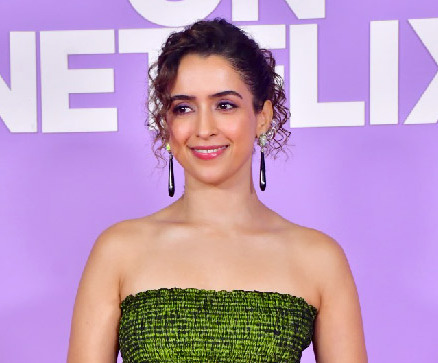
- Malhotra in 2025
- Born: 25 February 1992 (age 34); Delhi, India
- Education: Gargi College
- Occupation: Actress
- Years active: 2016–present

Sanya Malhotra (born 25 February 1992) is an Indian actress who primarily works in Hindi films. She has had supporting roles in the sports film Dangal (2016) and the action film Jawan (2023), both of which rank among the highest-grossing Indian films. Malhotra's other commercially successful films were the comedy Badhaai Ho (2018) and the biopic Sam Bahadur (2023).

Malhotra received nominations for the Filmfare Critics Award for Best Actress for her leading roles in the drama Photograph (2019) and the black comedy Ludo (2020). She also received praise for starring in the streaming films Shakuntala Devi (2020), Pagglait (2021), Love Hostel (2022), Kathal (2023) and Mrs. (2024), winning two Filmfare OTT Awards for the latter two.

== Early life ==
Malhotra was born on 25 February 1992 in Delhi in a Punjabi family. She studied at Ryan International School in Delhi. She is a trained dancer in contemporary and ballet. After graduating from Gargi College, Malhotra participated in the dance reality show Dance India Dance and made it to the top 100. She moved to Mumbai, where she began appearing in auditions and began assisting camerapersons for television commercials. She was later contacted by the film casting director Mukesh Chhabra.

== Career ==
=== Early work and recognition (2016–2019) ===
Malhotra was selected for Nitesh Tiwari's biographical sports film Dangal along with Fatima Sana Shaikh, who was also relatively new. Before the film, she said that she did not know much about wrestling. She then watched several videos on wrestling and "how wrestlers move, walk, their body language" and also did the training. Both Malhotra and Sheikh went through five rounds of auditions, physical training and workshops with Tiwari and Aamir Khan. They were trained by coach and former wrestler Kripa Shankar Patel Bishnoi. Released in 2016, Dangal received critical acclaim and became the highest-grossing Indian film ever with earnings of more than ₹2,000 crore (US$210 million) worldwide. Anupama Chopra said in her review that Malhotra provides "strong support" to the story. Malhotra later choreographed the song "Sexy Baliye" for the Secret Superstar (2017), which featured Khan.

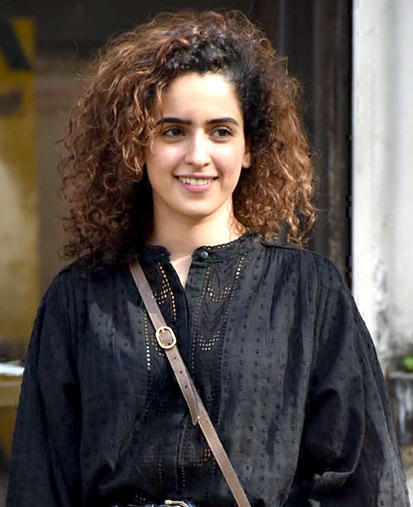
Malhotra in 2019

Two years later, Malhotra starred in Vishal Bhardwaj's drama Pataakha (2018) alongside newcomer Radhika Madan. Based on the short story Do Behnen by Charan Singh Pathik, it tells the story of two warring sisters in Rajasthan. The story was based on the wives of Pathik's brothers. To prepare for the film, both she and Madan met the real inspiration behind the characters to learn their nuances. The two stayed in Ronsi village near Jaipur and learned the Rajasthani dialect; they also got accustomed to milking buffaloes, thatching roofs, plastering the walls with dung and walking for long distances while balancing matkas full of water on their head and another around their waist. They also had to put on 10 kg of weight. Critic Raja Sen found Malhotra to be a "fearless actress" and thought that she "plays this character with unhinged enthusiasm". In the same year, she took on a supporting role in Amit Sharma's critically and commercially successful comedy Badhaai Ho, starring Ayushmann Khurrana.

In 2019, Malhotra starred in Ritesh Batra's Photograph. The film follows a street photographer Rafi, played by Nawazuddin Siddiqui, who tries to convince a student Miloni (Malhotra) to pose as his fiancée so that his grandmother stops pressuring him to get married. It was screened at the 2019 Sundance Film Festival and at the 69th Berlin International Film Festival. The Hollywood Reporter featured her in their listing of "breakout talent" from the latter festival. Rahul Desai of Film Companion gave Photograph a positive review and wrote that Malhotra "becomes the dreamy-eyed participant that enables the film to embrace its quiet glances and gentle flights of fantasy." Malhotra was nominated for the Filmfare Critics Award for Best Actress for the film.

=== Streaming films and critical acclaim (2020–present) ===
Malhotra's two films of 2020—the biographical film Shakuntala Devi and the black comedy Ludo—were initially planned for theatrical release. However, due to the COVID-19 pandemic in India, they were released directly on Amazon Prime Video and Netflix respectively. Shakuntala Devi, directed by Anu Menon, is about the mental calculator of the same name and starred Vidya Balan in the titular role, with Malhotra portraying Devi's daughter Anupama. Mike McCahill of The Guardian found Malhotra to be "quietly affecting" in her part and commended her for holding her own opposite her co-star. Anurag Basu's anthology film, Ludo, featured her alongside an ensemble cast. India Today's Nairita Mukherjee took note of the "outstanding camaraderie" between Malhotra and her co-star Aditya Roy Kapur. For her performance in Ludo, she received another nomination for the Filmfare Critics Award for Best Actress.

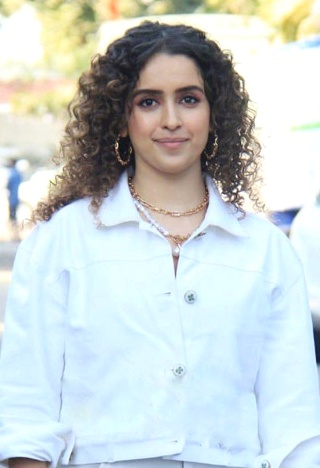
Malhotra in 2022

Malhotra's first two films of 2021 were released on Netflix. In the black comedy Pagglait, she starred as a young widow who discovers her late-husband's infidelity. Critic Anna M. M. Vetticad found her to be aptly cast in a subtle part. She received a Best Actress nomination at the Filmfare OTT Awards. Malhotra then starred alongside Abhimanyu Dassani as newlyweds in the romantic comedy Meenakshi Sundareshwar. The film received criticism for its stereotypical representation of Tamil people. In 2022, she starred in the ZEE5 film Love Hostel, a thriller about honour killing, opposite Vikrant Massey. Sukanya Verma of Rediff.com wrote that both Massey and Malhotra "effortlessly convey the flavour of the world they inhabit". Malhotra had a small role opposite Rajkummar Rao in the thriller HIT: The First Case, a remake of the Telugu film of the same name. Reviewers for The Times of India and News 18 bemoaned her lack of screen time.

2023 featured Malhotra in three films, all of which went on to win National Film Awards. She first had a starring role as a small-town cop in pursuit of a missing jackfruit in the Netflix satirical film Kathal. Hindustan Times's Monika Rawal Kukreja was appreciative of her comic timing. Her performance earned her a Filmfare OTT Award for Best Actor in a Web Original Film (Female). At the 71st National Film Awards the film won the award for Best Hindi Feature Film. She next had a supporting role as a doctor in Jawan, an action film starring Shah Rukh Khan. It ranks as one of Indian cinema's biggest grossers. In her final release of the year, she played the wife of Sam Maneckshaw in the biopic Sam Bahadur, starring Vicky Kaushal in the title role. Anuj Kumar of The Hindu reviewed, "Malhotra as his lovely, supportive wife Siloo proves equal to Vicky's charm". It was a modest commercial success. At the 71st National Film Awards the film won Best Feature Film Promoting National, Social and Environmental Values.

The drama Mrs., a Hindi remake of the Malayalam film The Great Indian Kitchen, starring Malhotra as a newlywed dealing with regressive patriarchal traditions, premiered at the 2024 Indian Film Festival of Melbourne, and released on ZEE5 in 2025. Malhotra earned unanimous acclaim for her performance with Sukanya Verma commending her for matching up to Nimisha Sajayan's performance in the original. In 2025, Malhotra starred in Shashank Khaitan's Sunny Sanskari Ki Tulsi Kumari, a romantic comedy starring Varun Dhawan and Janhvi Kapoor. WION's Shomini Sen felt that both Malhotra and her co-star Rohit Saraf were not given adequate scope to perform in their roles, but Hindustan Times' Rishabh Suri commended the actress for salvaging a character that had been limited by poor writing. It failed commercially.

Malhotra's film Bandar, was her first release in 2026. It had its premier at the Toronto International Film Festival in 2025. She played sister to an actor accused of rape (played by Bobby Deol). Sana Farzeen of India Today felt she "makes the most of what's written for her." She then reunited with Rajkummar Rao for the comedy film Toaster (2026), which was released onto Netflix. It tells the story of a man who embarks on a frantic search to recover a toaster he had gifted at a wedding. In a scathing review for The Indian Express, Shubhra Gupta remarked that even the performances of the lead pair "cannot rescue this dull constructed slop".

== In the media ==
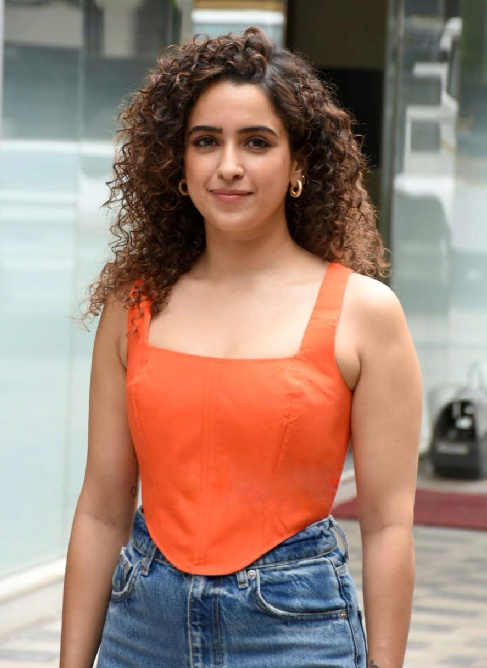
Malhotra in 2022

Tanisha Bhattacharya of Filmfare noted, "Malhotra has made a career out of seeking content-centric films. She has wowed the audience with her natural performance." Shilpa Dubey of Femina stated, "Contradicting the cookie-cutter style big-screen debuts, her onset in Bollywood was a refreshing game-changer in Dangal." Malhotra ranked 3rd in Rediff.com's "The 10 Best Actresses" list of 2021. She is an endorser for several brands and products including Fastrack and Shoppers Stop.

In July 2025, she partnered along with Essenzaa Nutrition founder Kunal Shah and Siddharth Shah launched Bree Matcha, a premium lifestyle brand inspired by the calm clarity and ritual of Japanese Traditional Culture.

== Filmography ==
Key
†	Denotes films that have not yet been released

=== Films ===
Year	Title	Role	Notes	Ref.
2016	Dangal	Babita Kumari	Debut film	
2017	Secret Superstar	—	Choreographer for song "Sexy Baliye"	
2018	Pataakha	Genda "Chuttki" Kumari		
2018	Badhaai Ho	Renee Sharma		
2019	Photograph	Miloni Shah		
2020	Shakuntala Devi	Anupama "Anu" Banerjee		
2020	Ludo	Shruti Choksi		
2021	Pagglait	Sandhya Pandey Giri		
2021	Meenakshi Sundareshwar	G. Meenakshi		
2022	Love Hostel	Jyoti Dilawar		
2022	HIT: The First Case	Neha Mahta		
2023	Kathal	DSP Mahima Basore		
2023	Jawan	Dr. Eeram		
2023	Sam Bahadur	Silloo Manekshaw		
2024	Mrs.	Richa Sharma		
2024	Baby John	Satya's prospective bride	Special appearance	
2025	Thug Life	—	Tamil film; cameo appearance in song "Jinguchaa"	
2025	Bandar	Suhaani Mehra	Monkey in a Cage at TIFF	
2025	Sunny Sanskari Ki Tulsi Kumari	Ananya Bhatia		
2026	Toaster	Shilpa Parikh		
2026	Sundar Poonam †	Poonam	Filming	

=== Music videos ===
Year	Title	Singer	Ref.
2024	"Aankh"	Sunidhi Chauhan	
2025	"Charmer"	Diljit Dosanjh	

== Accolades ==
Year	Awards	Category	Film	Result	Ref.
2018	Jackie Chan Action Movie Awards	Best New Action Performer	Dangal	Won	
2019	Screen Awards	Best Actress (Critics)	Pataakha	Nominated	
2020	Filmfare Awards	Best Actress (Critics)	Photograph	Nominated	
2021	Filmfare Awards	Best Actress (Critics)	Ludo	Nominated	
2021	Filmfare OTT Awards	Best Actress in a Web Original Film	Pagglait	Nominated	
2022	International Indian Film Academy Awards	Best Actress	Pagglait	Nominated	
2022	Filmfare OTT Awards	Best Actress in a Web Original Film	Meenakshi Sundareshwar	Nominated	
2022	Filmfare OTT Awards	Best Actress in a Web Original Film	Love Hostel	Nominated	
2023	2023 Filmfare OTT Awards	Best Actress in a Web Original Film – Critics	Kathal	Won	
2023	2023 Filmfare OTT Awards	Best Actress in a Web Original Film	Kathal	Nominated	
2024	Iconic Gold Awards	Best Actress – Critics	Kathal	Won	
2024	New York Indian Film Festival	Best Actress of the Year	Mrs.	Won	
2025	Bollywood Hungama Style Icons	Most Stylish People’s Choice Star of the Year – Female	Mrs.	Won	
