= The Sky Is Pink =

2019 Indian film written and directed by Shonali Bose

- Theatrical release poster
- Directed by: Shonali Bose
- Written by: Dialogues: Shonali Bose; Juhi Chaturvedi
- Screenplay by: Shonali Bose; Nilesh Maniyar
- Story by: Shonali Bose
- Produced by: Ronnie Screwvala; Siddharth Roy Kapur; Priyanka Chopra
- Starring: Priyanka Chopra; Farhan Akhtar; Zaira Wasim; Rohit Suresh Saraf
- Narrated by: Zaira Wasim
- Cinematography: Kartik Vijay; Nick Cooke
- Edited by: Manas Mittal
- Music by: Songs: Pritam; MEMBA (1 song); Background Score: Pritam; Mikey McCleary
- Production companies: Roy Kapur Films; Purple Pebble Pictures; Ivanhoe Pictures
- Distributed by: RSVP Movies
- Release dates: 13 September 2019 (TIFF); 11 October 2019 (India)
- Running time: 143 minutes
- Countries: India; United States
- Language: Hindi
- Budget: ₹240 million
- Box office: est. ₹344.1 million

The Sky Is Pink is a 2019 Indian Hindi-language biographical romantic comedy-drama film written and directed by Shonali Bose and produced by Siddharth Roy Kapur, Ronnie Screwvala and Priyanka Chopra Jonas under their production companies Roy Kapur Films, RSVP Movies, and Purple Pebble Pictures, respectively, in association with Ivanhoe Pictures. A co-production between India and the United States, the film stars Priyanka Chopra, Farhan Akhtar, Zaira Wasim and Rohit Suresh Saraf, and is based on the true story of Aisha Chaudhary, who suffered from severe combined immunodeficiency and pulmonary fibrosis, and tells the story of her parents Aditi and Niren as they navigate their marriage while dealing with their daughter's illness. The film marked the last film of Wasim's career prior to her retirement from Hindi cinema.

Aditi Chaudhary approached Bose to make a film based on her daughter's life story. Although intrigued by the story, Bose instead chose to depict the parents' story from Aisha's point of view by incorporating first-person narrative, focusing on their marriage and the effect of their child's illness on their lives and relationship. Bose wrote the screenplay based on the details she gathered through interviewing both of her parents. Nilesh Maniyar wrote the additional screenplay while Juhi Chaturvedi wrote the Hindi dialogues. Principal photography took place in Mumbai, London, Delhi and the Andaman Islands. The film's soundtrack was composed by Pritam while Gulzar wrote the lyrics for the songs. The film explores themes such as death and its acceptance, motherhood, grief and the effect of the loss of a child on relationships, particularly on the parents' companionship.

The film premiered at the 44th Toronto International Film Festival on 13 September 2019 and was released worldwide on 11 October the same year. The Sky Is Pink received positive reviews, with praise for Bose's writing and direction, and the performances of the cast. However, it did not perform well commercially, grossing ₹34.41 crore at the box office against a budget of ₹24 crore. At the 65th Filmfare Awards, The Sky Is Pink received 3 nominations – Best Film (Critics), Best Actress (Chopra Jonas) and Best Supporting Actress (Wasim). The film is now available on Netflix.

== Plot ==
Aisha Chaudhary narrated the story of her parents Moose (her mother) and Panda (her father) from the afterlife. Aditi and Niren Chaudhary are a young couple who come from different backgrounds. The couple get married and Aditi becomes pregnant with their first child Tanya Chaudhary, who dies within months of her birth due to the severe combined immunodeficiency condition.

Aditi and Niren have a second child named Ishaan. A few years later, Aditi bore their third child, a girl named Aisha. They later learn Aisha has the same medical condition as Tanya did and are heartbroken. After the doctors in Delhi give up on Aisha's treatment, the couple go to London where they learn the disease could be treated with a very costly bone marrow transplant. Niren starts working to earn the money while also asking for crowdfunding via a radio station. After several weeks, they learn that several people have donated money for Aisha's treatment. The surgery is successful but Aisha is kept under doctor's watch. Aditi decides to stay in London while Niren returns to India with his family and his son Ishaan.

Several years later, Aisha has recovered from her illness, and Niren and Aditi decide to move back to India. They move to the outskirts of Delhi and buy a large, opulent bungalow. After collapsing at a party, Aisha is diagnosed with pulmonary fibrosis, a side-effect of the chemotherapy she underwent. With Aisha's life shortened, Aditi sets out to fulfill all of Aisha's dreams such as adopting a pet, seeing aquatic life and writing a book. As Aisha's condition worsens, Aditi grows increasingly overprotective and stressed, and suffers a psychotic breakdown and is hospitalized. Aditi does everything in her power to ensure Aisha gets to see the first copy of her book," My Little Epiphanies", before she dies.

After the death of Aisha, Aditi and Niren's relationship is strained. While living together, they grow apart and are constantly fighting with each other. Niren is angry and leaves for London while Aditi stays in India. Aditi later goes to meet Niren in London and they reconcile by keeping the memories of Aisha.

== Cast ==
The cast has been listed below:

- Priyanka Chopra as Aditi 'Moose' Chaudhary; Niren's wife, Tanya, Ishaan and Aisha's mother
- Farhan Akhtar as Niren 'Panda' Chaudhary; Aditi's husband, Tanya, Ishaan and Aisha's father
- Zaira Wasim as Aisha 'Aishi' Chaudhary; Niren and Aditi's youngest daughter, Ishaan and Tanya's Younger sister
- Rohit Saraf as Ishaan 'Giraffe' Chaudhary; Niren and Aditi's eldest son, Tanya's younger brother, Aisha's elder brother.
  - Vidhaan Sharma as Little Ishaan
- Manas Mittal as Anshu Tandon
- Rajshri Deshpande as Anita Tandon
- Lushin Dubey as Mrs. Tandon
- Sunil Chitkara as Mr. Chaudhary
- Nirupama Verma as Mrs. Chaudhary
- Puja Sarup as Mohini
- Gurpal Singh as RJ Arjun Gill (in London)
- Sheena Khalid as Rita
- Sudhanva Deshpande as Dr. Nirvick Gulati
- Manisha Chudasama as Santoshi Kumari, servant in Chaudhary's Delhi farmhouse
- Paras Rattan Sharda as Jeet Kumar, servant in Chaudhary's Delhi farmhouse
- Salmin Sheriff as Dr. Batliwala
- Rishi Deshpande as Tanya's doctor
- Virhi as Tanya 'Taanu' Chaudhary; Niren and Aditi's eldest daughter, Ishaan and Aisha's elder sister
- Mala Hashmi as a Christian woman
- Akshay Joshi as a store assistant
- Nargis Nandal as a pilot
- Khaleel as an orthopaedic surgeon
- Raabia Marici as Ishaan's girlfriend

== Production ==
=== Development ===
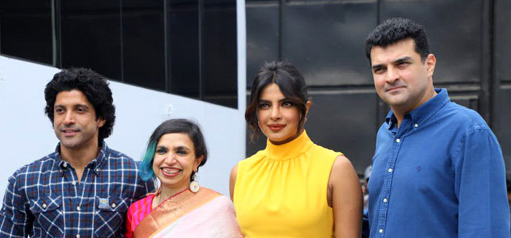
Farhan Akhtar, Shonali Bose, Priyanka Chopra Jonas and Siddharth Roy Kapur at a promotional event for this film in 2019

The production of The Sky Is Pink started when Aisha Chaudhary's mother Aditi Chaudhary approached Shonali Bose to make a film about her daughter, who had seen the trailer of Bose's film Margarita with a Straw (2015) thirty times and was eager to watch the film, saying, "I hope I live to see this film". Aisha died of pulmonary fibrosis when she was 18, two weeks after watching the trailer; she did not live to see the film. Nine months later, Aditi Chaudhary tracked down Bose, who was living in Los Angeles. Aditi was adamant as she only wanted Bose to tell the story of her daughter. Chaudhary and Bose interacted over Skype and later, Bose personally interviewed Aditi Chaudhary and Niren Chaudhary for eight hours a day for two weeks to gather all of the details of their story. Bose said the couple "talked and cried and healed through the process of those narrations".

Bose said she was drawn towards the story because she had lost her son and so was ready to explore the subject in film and bring some of her own perspective to it. Bose, however, preferred to tell the story of Aditi and Niren, a couple, dealing with their child's illness, saying that she was more interested in the story of parents dealing with their daughter's illness and not of a death-defying "heroic teenager". Bose said she was "intrigued and inspired" by the relationship of the family, observing that they were a rare couple to stay together after the death of their child. She said she "wanted to explore what happens to a love story, to a marriage, when faced with the loss of a child", noting that her own marriage ended after the death of her son, and that four out of five marriages dissolve after a child dies. Bose wanted to make an "unusual romantic film" and the lives of Aditi and Niren fit the bill.

Bose began writing the screenplay based on the Chaudharys' story, approaching it as a "love story between two people who fell in love when they were only 16 and now at 57 are still inseparable and in love despite major tragedies that tear most couples apart". Bose chose to tell the film from Aisha's point of view, focusing on 25 years of her parents' marriage and thus incorporating the first-person narrative. Nilesh Maniyar, a longtime collaborator of Bose, had met Aditi and Niren, and wanted to make a documentary about Aisha because he felt there was more to explore. Maniyar saw Bose's film as very different from his, both projects being in different formats. Maniyar had also researched Aisha's life so Bose invited him to write the additional screenplay. Juhi Chaturvedi wrote the Hindi dialogue.

Bose wanted to stay true to the real-life events and depict them as they unfolded without fictionalizing or deflecting from real incidents. She said, "I wrote the script as close as possible to the truth. So, when deciding the look and feel of the film, I decided to stay with realism and be as authentic as possible." While writing the script, Bose met with and interviewed Aisha's family and friends. She also read Aisha's writing, including her emails to her brother and the artwork she made. Bose said she felt connected with Aisha even though they never met. Bose chose to be realistic and to avoid melodramatic and manipulative set-ups to express emotions. She said that she wanted to keep clear of melodrama and not exploit the audience by causing "overwrought emotions", instead wanting them "to feel what [the] characters feel but also give [them] space." In an interview with Scroll.in, Bose said Aditi was the main protagonist in early drafts because she was the central figure in the story, but she later strengthened Niren's role so that they were equals in the final draft.

Siddharth Roy Kapur liked Bose's previous film and had expressed his desire to work with her. After the acquisition of UTV Motion Pictures by The Walt Disney Company, Kapur was appointed managing director of The Walt Disney Company India in 2014 and produced several films under the new name. Kapur established his own company, Roy Kapur Films, in January 2017. When Bose found out about his new production house, she approached him with the script of The Sky Is Pink and Kapur chose it to be his company's first film. Kapur said he found the script wonderfully moving, told with humour, depth and feeling. As part of a first look deal with RSVP Movies, Kapur set the film there, collaborating with Ronnie Screwvala, the ex-UTV Studio head, as producers. In December 2018, Ivanhoe Pictures became involved to co-finance and co-produce the film. Mikey McCleary composed the background score of the film. Bose considers The Sky Is Pink the culmination of her Delhi trilogy, a series of unrelated films based on "mother-child relationship" and that are set in Delhi; the other first two films being Amu (2005) and Margarita with a Straw. The Sky Is Pink's title comes from a real incident that is shown in the film.

=== Casting ===
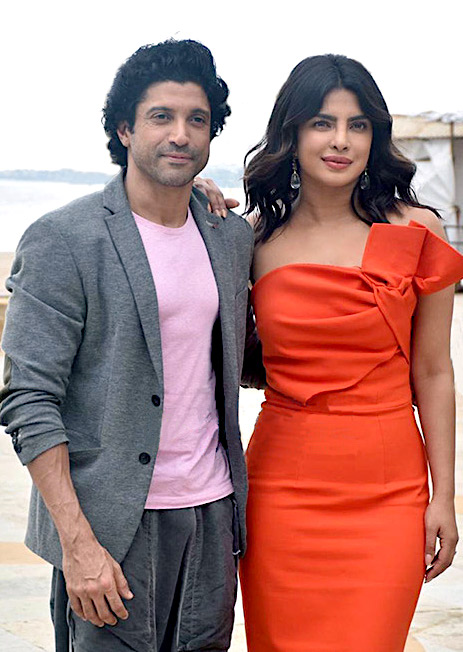
Farhan Akhtar with his co-star Priyanka Chopra Jonas promoting this film in 2019

Bose's first choice for the lead role was Priyanka Chopra Jonas, who she had in mind while writing the script. It took six months for Bose to contact Chopra Jonas, whose manager did not give her the script to read. According to Bose, Aditi Chaudhary had asked her to make a big Hindi film about her daughter but Roy Kapur initially thought it should be an independent film. He suggested Bose should get a well-known film actor first if she wanted to make the film on a bigger budget. Bose told him she wanted Chopra Jonas as Aditi and then asked him to contact her and send her a copy of the script, which he did. When Chopra Jonas read the script, she wanted to meet Bose and immediately agreed to appear in the film. She was the first actor to be cast in the film. For Aisha, Maniyar suggested Zaira Wasim, who immediately accepted the offer.

The film's casting news first appeared in the media in May 2018, suggesting Chopra Jonas, Abhishek Bachchan and Zaira Wasim had been cast in Bose's next untitled project. The media reports suggested Wasim had been cast as Aisha Chaudhary with Chopra and Bachchan playing her character's parents. A month later, media reports said Farhan Akhtar, who was also one of Bose's top choices, had replaced Bachchan and would be playing the father. Chopra Jonas confirmed her involvement in the film on 9 July 2018 by posting a picture of the script of The Sky Is Pink on her Instagram account, revealing the film's title. The official announcement followed the next day, confirming Akhtar's and Wasim's casting in the film.

The Sky Is Pink is the second film to feature Chopra Jonas and Akhtar opposite each other after Dil Dhadakne Do (2015). Bose had said Aisha's brother Ishaan was the most difficult character to cast; the casting directors auditioned hundred boys for the part. Finally, Rohit Suresh Saraf was cast after four rounds of auditions over four months. The Sky Is Pink marked the return of Chopra Jonas to Bollywood films after three years being busy with her Hollywood work. After accepting her role in the film, Chopra Jonas asked Kapur and Screwvala to join them as the producers because she believed in the film, wanted to take more responsibility for it and learn about producing from them. Kapur and Screwvala, both frequent collaborators of Chopra Jonas, who had starred in several of their films under UTV, agreed to engage Chopra Jonas as a producer, making The Sky Is Pink the first Hindi film to be produced under her company Purple Pebble Pictures. Bose had organized workshops for the actors, who did several rehearsals before the start of filming.

=== Characters ===
Chopra Jonas was drawn to the film because of the story and the way it was written, saying she found the treatment of a heavy subject with humour refreshing and beautiful. Chopra Jonas found her character Aditi immersive and described her as "a ferocious mom". Chopra Jonas did a lot of preparations and research before the filming and also met the real-life Aditi. Bose was opposed to Chopra Jonas meeting Aditi but Chopra Jonas was adamant the meeting must go ahead because Aditi treated the situation differently than her husband and she felt like she needed to have those difficult conversations with Aditi. According to Chopra Jonas, she was also dependent on Bose and would ask a lot of questions about the character. She learnt a lot from Bose and Aditi, and Bose's interpretation of Aditi. Chopra Jonas said, "I'm not a mother, I needed to understand from both Aditi and Shonali who have both lost their children ... where does that take you? What do you feel in your heart?" She said Aditi reminded of her of own mother and chose to channel her in Aditi. Chopra Jonas, who had no children, found the role challenging, saying the "film was scaring me in every scene" but felt the role made her experience two aspects of motherhood.

Akhtar chose to appear in The Sky Is Pink because of the story, which he found "moving and incredibly inspiring", and the people involved in the film. Akhtar also relied on Bose's vision of Niren to form his character. Akhtar was also instructed to not meet the real-life Aditi and Niren before filming; Bose did not want her actors to be influenced by or to imitate the film's subjects. Akhtar was given filmed interviews of the family for research, and also found that the research material in the form of writing and the footage helped him create his own version of Niren. Akhtar met Niren while filming; he felt he and Niren had a lot in common. Being a parent, Akhtar found easy to relate to his character; he said, "the challenge was not in feeling the kind of parental love I needed to evoke, but imagining what losing a child could potentially feel like". The actor said he chose not to over-dramatise his portrayal because "the real parents never over-dramatised their situation". Akhtar revealed that Aditi and Niren dealt with the situation in such a normal way that it would seem very abnormal to others and would invite the question of "How are they happy and smiling all the time?" He said, "They wanted to give their daughter a joyous life ... they didn't want her to be mournful and keep thinking about the end, they just wanted her to be happy as long as she was here ...It's so, so inspiring".

Like Chopra and Akhtar, Wasim was and drawn to the story of the film and said she had immediately fallen in love with it. Wasim said her character touched her heart and that she was honoured to be playing this role. Saraf described his character Ishaan as someone who becomes the pillar of the family during the tragedy. He said portraying the character was delightful because he could explore human emotions a lot more than he had before in his career. Unlike the rest of the cast, Saraf was not allowed to see the documented footage of the Chaudhary family because Bose thought he would not be able to take it well. To prepare for his character, Saraf had researched the Chaudhary family during the audition process. After his casting, he stopped his research and relied mostly on Bose's advice and the collaborative efforts of the cast, which he said enhanced his performance.

Costume designer Eka Lakhani designed the clothes for the film, which spans 25 years, during which Aditi's and Niren's looks undergo several changes as they age. These changes were mostly accomplished with make-up and hair styling. Chopra Jonas's hairstyle informs the age of her character; when her character is young, her hair is long and shortens as she ages in the film; at 50 she has short hair. Staying true to the real-life Aditi, Chopra Jonas was given a glamorous and make-up-heavy look because Aditi had made an effort to look glamorous and, throughout her 40s, her philosophy was "when life sucks, look like a million bucks". Chopra Jonas had suggested she should put on some weight and colour her hair grey to show her character's aging in the film but Bose declined her request. Bose thought it would be a cliché to show Aditi as dowdy in the later portions of the film because the real Aditi is very glamorous and likes to dress up, even in difficult times. When he is young, Akhtar's character Niren has curly hair but as he ages, he is given a moustache in the later portions of the film.

=== Filming ===
Principal photography of The Sky Is Pink began on 8 August 2018 in Mumbai with all of its cast members. The cinematographers were Kartik Vijay and Nick Cooke, and production design was done by Aradhana Seth. The second schedule of filming began on 13 October 2018 in London. The London schedule lasted six days and concluded on 19 October 2018. Filming moved to Delhi as a part of the second schedule on 12 November 2018. The scenes were filmed at several locations in Delhi, including Chandani Chowk, which Bose specifically chose to show the culture of the locality on film. Bose said, "Delhi has a lot of character and every locality means something. You can capture its beauty in the greenery here, the charm of old Delhi – this mix is very interesting." While filming in the locality, a "sea of people" gathered to watch Chopra and Akhtar, who were filming their scenes on a terrace. The second schedule of the film was completed in the last week of November. Chopra, who was getting married on 1 December 2018, filmed her scenes up until four days before her wedding to Nick Jonas. The film's producer Siddharth Roy Kapur praised Chopra Jonas for her commitment, saying, "Priyanka has been wonderful. She will be shooting with us right till the very eve of her nuptials, which I think shows a tremendous amount of professionalism." The producers and Bose were accommodating; they created a separate "wedding approvals room" for Chopra Jonas so she could discuss her wedding preparations with her team between filming her scenes.

In February 2019, Bose announced the final schedule of filming would occur in March. The final schedule began in the Andaman Islands on 1 March 2019 and continued until 9 March 2019 when the filming wrapped. Although the filming was completed, Bose said a song was still to be filmed. The filming of the song started on 6 June 2019 in Mumbai and lasted five days. The song "Pink Gulaabi Sky" was supposed to feature as part of the plot but Bose felt it did not go with the flow of the story. The song was cut from the final film and was ultimately used for promotional purposes. Bose complimented the producers for agreeing with her decision to cut the song, saying, "When we shot the song, I thought that it was a fun number and looked lovely. Later, I was surprised to see that the makers are in sync with my view. Considering the fact that the team had spent a lot of money to shoot the song, it requires guts to take a decision like this". The filming was done over ten months. The film was edited by Manas Mittal.

== Themes and influences ==
The Sky Is Pink's central theme of death and its acceptance was noted by many critics. Priyanka Roy of The Telegraph noted the melancholic theme and found its treatment in the film to be completely opposite, writing that the film "recognises the pain that arises from loss but it never makes loss the centre of what it wants to say". Subhash K. Jha said the director's conscious effort to keep the "going bouncy and bright" in spite of the looming presence of death could have gone horribly wrong but that "the war-cry to stay positive" is implemented with exceeding delicacy. According to Jha, the audience feel the presence of death underlining every moment of the film and yet the dilemma of mortality is "never trivialized, glamorized or underplayed". Jha felt that Bose's narrative sparkles with a joie de vivre, adding, "There is an unstoppable gusto woven into the story's somber spirit, like a shot of rum in coke. Bracing and clarity-inducing."

Ishita Sengupta of The Indian Express said the film goes beyond the central theme of "embracing death rather than feeling betrayed by it", commenting on the restroom scene in which Aditi and Niren talk after their daughter has died and Niren suggests a move to another country as a way to deal with their daughter's death and an astounded Aditi asking what will they do about their daughter's belongings. She noted Aditi was immersed in grief while Niren had moved on, saying "it no longer remains preoccupied with the act of letting go but delves into how much to let go of, asks who decides it and—mainly—how to". Sengupta said the film closely examines the "contours of grief" and the emotions surrounding it. Sengupta appreciated of the nonlinear narrative, which according to her makes the more sombre moments happier and offsets pathos with love. Bose, having lost her son, which resulted in end of her marriage, said she wanted to explore the relationship of couples who lose a child and its effects on their lives, often leading to the end of the marriage. Sengupta noted the director does not let mourning severe the ties between Aditi and Niren, writing, "It is not acceptance that brings Aditi and Niren together but the shared promise they had extracted in youth to stay with each other come what may. They do not fall back on who they have become but on who they were." Sengupta said the characters' reconciliation at the end of the film can be taken as "wish fulfillment" of Bose's own marriage or a compromise on reality from aching adversity. This sentiment was shared by Poulomi Das of Arré, who noted the film serves as both a post-mortem of the filmmaker's own fate and an exercise in second-hand catharsis or wish-fulfillment.

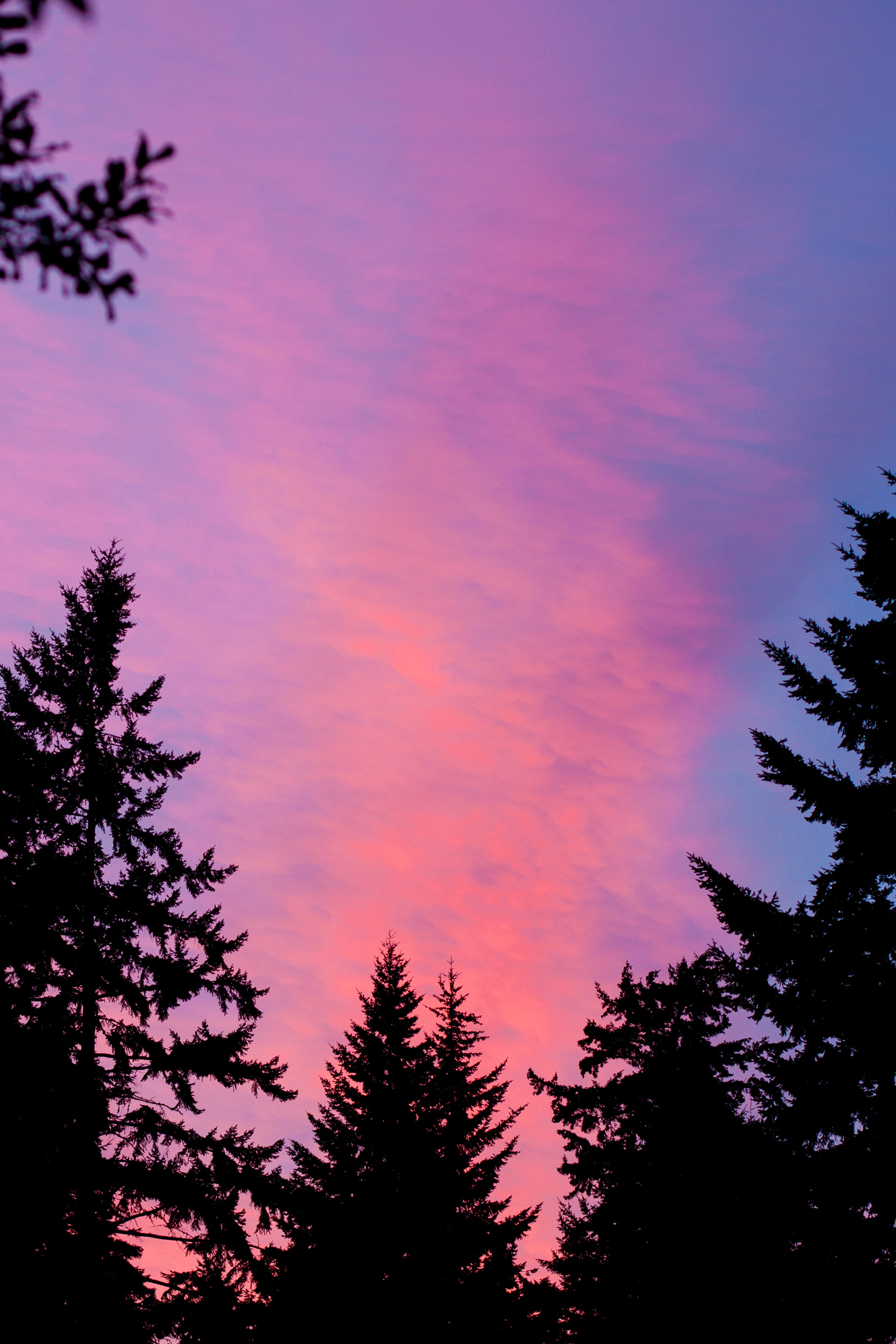
Commentators noted the metaphorical significance of the title.

According to Das, The Sky Is Pink examines the ethos of parenthood, noting the film feels less like a biopic of a dead teenager and more like an unabashed tribute to the parents, writing, "the afterlife of caregiving that depletes one while nourishing the other". She noted Bose had adopted a "curiously alternative gaze" to the dying girl template popularized by films such as My Sister's Keeper (2009) and The Fault in Our Stars (2014) to reverse conventions by focusing on the parents rather than the dying girl. A review published in Mid-Day said the film is about the resilience of parents "who move heaven and earth for the good of their children". The reviewer said, "the film smartly plays with the structure to dive audience deeper and deeper into the characters and circumstances on screen—rather than simply a plot", which makes audience emerge from "an astonishingly personal story navigating through dark spaces with reasonable hope and incredible insight".

Sonia Chopra of Sify said, "If the film's idea is to make you rethink life, it succeeds to a great extent. It also makes you think about choices and how they affect our lives. At one point, the film explores what constitutes a "right choice" and whether such a thing exists." She noted the humour and emotional pay-offs in the film while praising the director for going deeper while keeping things palatable, and said it makes us think about Hrishikesh Mukherjee's Anand (1971). Bose said she told her own philosophy in the film, but she did not aim to teach anyone anything, saying, "I am simply showing you certain characters with certain relationships and things that happened to them. The fact that they are absolutely real and nothing is made up, may give you food for thought and inspire you a little".

Shrishti Negi of News18 noted The Sky Is Pink's courageous and sobering portrayal of motherhood, calling Aditi a "ferociously protective mother" who uses her daughter's impending death to inspire her to live an eventful life. According to Negi, "Aditi's journey is just as crucial to the film in all its complex, transfixing and wrenching dynamics". This sentiment was echoed by Charvi Kathuria of SheThePeople, who wrote, "The movie is a subtle reminder for us to live our life to the fullest because we really don't know which day becomes our last day. Aditi knew that her daughter won't be alive for very long. She wanted her daughter to enjoy her life to the hilt."

Bose said Aditi was a tigress (in terms of her children), who "came up with a mental bucket list for her daughter and made each moment count of her remaining short life". Nishi Trivedi of Bengaluru Central University noted the significance of the "metaphorical title", writing the film's message is "live life on your own terms", adding, "The idea that you can paint the sky with the colour you want gives a deeper meaning to the title of the film". The film's title comes from a real incident involving Aditi and Ishaan. An incident [as shown in the film] where Ishaan is unfairly punished at school for painting his sky pink instead of blue. Consoling the child, Aditi tells him that everyone has their own sky and they can paint it with whichever colour they like. Sonia Chopra took note of the scene calling it a "standout" moment. Bose told an interviewer: "I found a beautiful metaphor in this real incident where a mother teaches and encourages her child to think out of the box and not be bound by society's restrictions and preconceived notions".

A review published in HuffPost took note of the colour palette used in the film, saying, "the dark shadow of death looms large over the film's bubblegum-wrapped, glossy universe". According to the reviewer, London's winters look "ominous" with the city's red Tube trains and telephone boxes popping out as "signages of gloom" in frames composed mostly of depressing greys, writing, "The frames (and the character wardrobes) light up as the film's mood progresses to become more cheerful, with dramatic reds, purples, and yellows illuminating the screen". Jha noted London to be a living character in the film.

== Soundtrack ==
The music soundtrack to The Sky Is Pink was composed by Pritam and the lyrics were written by Gulzar. It contains four original songs and a reprisal, with vocals performed by Arijit Singh, Antara Mitra, Arjun Kanungo, Lisa Mishra, Shashwat Singh, Jonita Gandhi and Sreerama Chandra. The soundtrack album was released on 7 October 2019 by Zee Music Company. Though not a part of the main soundtrack, the film's closing credits include a song titled "For Aisha" that was composed by Aisha Chaudhary's brother Ishaan under his band name "Memba". The song is sung by the Nooran Sisters, Naomi Wild and Evan Giia. Anvita Dutt wrote the song with Memba, Wild and Giia.

== Marketing and release ==
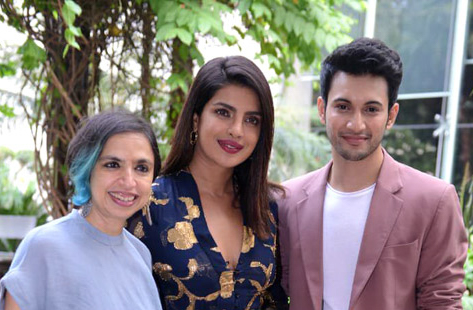
Bose, Chopra Jonas and Rohit Suresh Saraf at the film's promotional event in Delhi

The Sky Is Pink was one of the most anticipated Indian films of 2019. Roy Kapur had hoped for the film to be released in the first half of 2019 but in February 2019, it was announced the film would be released on 11 October 2019. The first look of the film was released on 23 July 2019. Several exclusive stills from the film were released on 8 September 2019. The first poster was released on 9 September 2019 and Chopra Jonas tweeted that the official trailer would be released the next day. Firstpost commented that the "aesthetically pleasing poster" looked "fun-filled and refreshing." The film's trailer was released on 10 September 2019. HuffPost said the film looked like a "winner" while The New Indian Express called the trailer "heart warming", noting it "promises to be a love story high on emotional quotient with an equal amount of humour".

In July 2019, media reported The Sky Is Pink had been selected to premiere at the 44th Toronto International Film Festival. The only Asian film to be selected for "Gala Presentation", The Sky Is Pink premiered at the festival at the Roy Thomson Hall on 13 September 2019 and received a 15-minute standing ovation. The premiere was attended by 2,000 people and tickets sold out. The Chaudhary family were in the attendance at the premiere along with the cast, director and the producers. The premiere was followed by another sold-out screening at the Elgin Theatre. The film also premiered at the 24th Busan International Film Festival and the 2019 BFI London Film Festival.

The promotion of the film started in the last week of September 2019. Chopra Jonas, Akhtar, Saraf and Bose took part in the promotion of the film but Wasim, who by the time of its release had retired from acting due to her religious beliefs, did not. After promoting the film in India, Chopra Jonas promoted it in the United States by appearing on American prime time talk show The Tonight Show Starring Jimmy Fallon and the daytime talk show The View. The Sky Is Pink became the first Hindi film to be promoted on The Tonight Show Starring Jimmy Fallon.

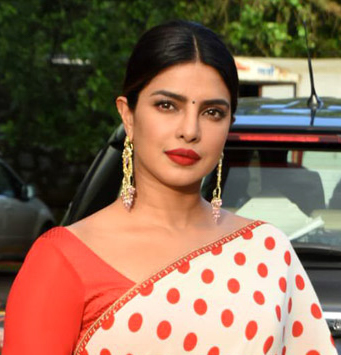
Priyanka Chopra promoting The Sky Is Pink

Made on a budget of ₹240 million, The Sky Is Pink was released on 11 October 2019. It received a limited release in the United States. Netflix brought the worldwide streaming rights of the film, a first for an Indian film. It became available on the platform on 11 December 2019. The film is also available on Apple TV Plus.

== Reception ==
=== Critical response ===
The Sky Is Pink received positive reviews from critics. On the review aggregator website Rotten Tomatoes, the film holds a rating of 71% based on 21 reviews and an average rating of 6.1/10. Devesh Sharma of Filmfare rated the film four stars out of five, lauding its ability to make viewers laugh despite its tragic undertone. He concluded, "this bitter-sweet film will make you laugh, will make you cry and will surely make you ruminate on the glorious uncertainty of life". Writing for Mid-Day, film critic Mayank Shekhar rated The Sky Is Pink three and a half stars out of five, praising Bose for telling an "astonishingly dark personal story with reasonable hope" that never felt exploitative or manipulative. He complemented the "smart" screenplay, which he felt was structured to dive viewers "deeper and deeper" into the characters and circumstances on screen. In a three and a half stars out of five review, Sukanya Verma of Rediff.com declared Chopra Jonas's "fiery performance" to be the film's highlight while also praising the performances of Akhtar, Wasim and Saraf.

Ankur Pathak of HuffPost called the film a "soul-stirring portrait of love, life and death" that is "cinematic equivalent of visiting a therapist". He singled out Chopra Jonas' "extraordinary" performance which he thought was "hard to look away from" while also noting Akhtar's "measured performance" and Wasim's "fantastic" turn. Sreeparna Sengupta of The Times of India gave the film three and a half stars out of five, calling it "a stirring watch" and noting the film scores high on the emotional quotient and the performances of its principal cast. Writing for NDTV, Saibal Chatterjee rated the film three and a half stars out of five, praised Bose for her direction and writing, and added it had been "enhanced appreciably by the presence of Chopra".

Writing for Firstpost, Anna M. M. Vetticad said The Sky Is Pink is a "moving, uncommonly calm take on grief" which is "funny, believable and heart-wrenching all rolled into one". She praised Chopra Jonas for her "remarkably controlled performance", Akhtar for a solid turn and for matching Chopra Jonas's "simmering restraint", Wasim for her "cheeriness" and for not going "over the top", and Saraf's "matured performance". Teo Bugbee of The New York Times lauded Bose for achieving a balanced tone in the film, writing, "The writer and director Shonali Bose bounces from tone to tone, livening the somber subject matter with bright hues, quippy dialogue and an ever-jubilant score". Bugbee also highlighted the appeal of the performances, particularly that of Chopra Jonas. Samira Sood of ThePrint said the film is "an emotionally wrenching yet bitingly funny exploration of family and death". Vinayak Chakraborty of Outlook rated the film three stars out of five, criticising the "flashback-driven storyline" and its runtime, which he felt was too long at nearly two and half hours. He said, however, the film still works with all of its flaws. Anupama Chopra of Film Companion found the film to be "sensitive" but highly "sanitised". She wrote "The Sky is Pink is sincere and heartfelt but it never gets raw or messy". Rajeev Masand criticised the film's "blatant manipulation" but added, "there are moments that left me with a heavy heart". Both Anupama Chopra and Masand considered Akhtar's performance to be more effective than that of the other cast members while also praising the performances of Chopra Jonas and Wasim.

Shubhra Gupta of The Indian Express rated The Sky Is Pink with two stars out of five, and said the film only occasionally works and that it feels "both constructed and sentimental", writing, "With the material at hand, you expect a legitimate heart-breaker but this one left me mostly unmoved". Cath Clarke of The Guardian dismissed the film as "way too saccharine" and said there are only "occasional moments ... that shine with truth". Dennis Harvey of Variety disliked The Sky Is Pink and wrote that the "somewhat bland polish on all levels doesn't much assist the raw pain that should be at this story's center". Nandini Ramnath of Scroll.in also disliked the film, writing that the "attempt to be insouciant about death produces no emotional pay-offs". Ramnath found Wasim and Saraf to be "lovely"; Chopra Jonas to be "more affecting than Akhtar" but said Chopra Jonas' "perfectly made-up face and fashion-forwardness are huge distractions".

=== Box office ===
Being an "offbeat and niche" film targeting a mature audience in big cities, commercial expectations from The Sky Is Pink were low. In an interview with Hindustan Times, trade analyst Girish Johar noted the business of the film largely relied on word of mouth, saying, "It is an upmarket film, a human drama for limited audience. It will release only in big cities and metros." The film collected ₹2.50 crore on the opening day and revenue was expected to grow the next day. The film showed 60% of growth on its second day and earned ₹4 crore. Revenue remained static on its third day, collecting ₹4 crore for an opening weekend collection of ₹10.70 crore at the domestic box office.

The Sky Is Pink faced strong competition from the Bollywood action thriller War and the comic book film Joker, both of which were doing business exceeding the expectations of the trade. The Sky Is Pink dropped over 40% on its first Monday, collecting ₹1.30 crore on its fourth day and earning ₹15.40 crore in its first week. The film collected ₹4.50 crore in its second week, and collections stood at approximately ₹20 crore after two weeks. It did not perform well at the box office. Trade Analyst Joginder Tuteja summarised the reason for the film's disappointing commercial performance, which he thought "deserved better", in an article published on Moneycontrol.com, blaming the "poor marketing" that "didn't really convey clearly what the film was all about", in addition to strong competition from other films. He also said the film's English title was its biggest problem because it was too literary and made it sound like an American and European art film. According to Bollywood Hungama, The Sky Is Pink grossed ₹23.85 crore in India and ₹10.56 crore overseas for a worldwide gross revenue of ₹344.1 million.

== Accolades ==
Award (Note: Awards, festivals and organizations are in alphabetical order.)	Date of ceremony (Note: Date is linked to the article about the awards held that year, wherever possible.)	Category	Recipient(s)	Result	Ref.
Filmfare Awards	15 February 2020	Best Film (Critics)	Shonali Bose	Nominated	
Filmfare Awards	15 February 2020	Best Actress	Priyanka Chopra Jonas	Nominated	
Filmfare Awards	15 February 2020	Best Supporting Actress	Zaira Wasim	Nominated	
FOI Online Awards	11 February 2020	Best Feature Film	Ronnie Screwvala & Siddharth Roy Kapur	Nominated	
FOI Online Awards	11 February 2020	Best Actor	Farhan Akhtar	Nominated	
FOI Online Awards	11 February 2020	Best Actress	Priyanka Chopra Jonas	Nominated	
FOI Online Awards	11 February 2020	Best Supporting Actress	Zaira Wasim	Nominated	
FOI Online Awards	11 February 2020	Best Original Screenplay	Nilesh Maniyar & Shonali Bose	Nominated	
FOI Online Awards	11 February 2020	Best Background Score	Mikey McCleary	Nominated	
FOI Online Awards	11 February 2020	Best Original Song	"Dil Hi Toh Hai" – Pritam & Gulzar	Nominated	
FOI Online Awards	11 February 2020	Best Lyricist	Gulzar – "Dil Hi Toh Hai"	Nominated	
International Indian Film Academy Awards	24 November 2021	Best Actress	Priyanka Chopra Jonas	Nominated	
International Indian Film Academy Awards	24 November 2021	Best Male Playback Singer	Arijit Singh – (for song "Dil Hi Toh Hai")	Nominated	
Screen Awards	8 December 2019	Best Film (Critics)	Shonali Bose	Nominated	
Screen Awards	8 December 2019	Best Actress (Critics)	Priyanka Chopra Jonas	Nominated	
Screen Awards	8 December 2019	Best Actor (Critics)	Farhan Akhtar	Nominated	
Screen Awards	8 December 2019	Best Supporting Actress	Zaira Wasim	Nominated	
