= Aankh Micholi (2023 film) =

2023 comedy film by Umesh Shukla

- Theatrical release poster
- Directed by: Umesh Shukla
- Written by: Jitendra Parmar
- Produced by: Ashish Wagh; Umesh Shukla
- Starring: Paresh Rawal; Abhimanyu Dassani; Mrunal Thakur
- Cinematography: Sameer Arya
- Edited by: Steven H. Bernard
- Music by: Sachin–Jigar
- Production companies: Merry Go Round Studios; Sony Pictures International Productions
- Distributed by: Sony Pictures Releasing International
- Release date: 3 November 2023
- Running time: 144 minutes
- Country: India
- Language: Hindi
- Box office: est.₹1.50 crore

Aankh Micholi (transl. Eye Catching) is a 2023 Indian Hindi-language comedy film directed by Umesh Shukla and produced by Ashish Wagh and Umesh Shukla under the banner of Merry Go Round Studios and Sony Pictures International Productions. It revolves around a family of misfits and stars Paresh Rawal, Abhimanyu Dassani and Mrunal Thakur as leads. The film was released on 3 November 2023 and received negative reviews from critics and was a box-office disaster.

== Plot ==
Navjot Singh, an Ayurvedic doctor in Hoshiarpur, leads a highly unusual household. His elder son Yuvraj is hard of hearing, younger son Harbhajan (“Bhajji”) has a pronounced stutter, and daughter Paro suffers from night blindness. Despite their warm relationships, the family is plagued by personal challenges they desperately try to keep hidden. When Navjot finds a marriage proposal for Paro from Rohit Patel, an NRI from Australia, the entire Singh family leaps into action to present themselves in the best light, concealing every one of their flaws from Rohit and his parents.

Paro and Rohit had earlier met by chance during a trip to Switzerland, when Rohit rescues her from a purse thief, but Paro's condition prevents her from seeing him clearly in dim light. When Rohit comes to India to formally meet Paro's family, his arrival at night becomes the first of many obstacles caused by the Singh family's deception—Paro can't see him well; Navjot and the brothers scramble to avoid revealing the truth. Yuvraj's wife Billo, who only discovered after marriage that he could not hear properly, gradually becomes suspicious of the Singh family's secrecy. She sees parallels in Paro's situation and begins plotting to force the exposure of their hidden truths.

Meanwhile, Rohit is also keeping a secret: he suffers from hemeralopia (day-blindness), meaning he struggles to see clearly in bright daylight. This revelation adds a twist to the already tangled web of concealments. Under pressure, multiple deception plots unravel. Members of both families learn the truths about one another's conditions. In particular, Rohit's condition becomes known, as do Paro's and her family's flaws.

In the climax, truths are confronted openly. Despite the chaos, hurt feelings, and misunderstandings, the two families come to recognize that imperfections are part of human nature. The story concludes on a reconciliatory note: Paro and Rohit are married, with their families embracing them fully—flaws and all—with the message that acceptance and honesty are more powerful than facade and pretence.

== Cast ==
- Paresh Rawal as Navjot Singh
- Abhimanyu Dassani as Rohit Patel
- Mrunal Thakur as Paro Singh
- Sharman Joshi as Yuvraj Singh
- Abhishek Banerjee as Harbhajan Singh
- Divya Dutta as Billo Kaur, Yuvraj's wife
- Darshan Jariwala as Rohit's Maternal uncle
- Grusha Kapoor as Rohit's maternal aunt
- Vijay Raaz as Bhatti, the Jweller
- Vrushali as Chaitali's sister
- Danesh Gandhi as Rohit's friend

== Production ==
In February 2020, the film was announced by Culver Max Entertainment and stars Abhimanyu Dassani and Mrunal Thakur. The principal photography of the film wrapped during the COVID-19 pandemic in Patiala. The motion poster of the film was released on 19 July 2021. Initially planned for a 2021 release, Aankh Micholi was pushed to summer 2022 due to COVID-19 pandemic.

== Music ==
Aankh Micholi

Soundtrack album by Sachin–Jigar
- Released: 17 October 2023
- Recorded: 2022
- Genre: Feature film soundtrack
- Length: 14:32
- Language: Hindi
- Label: Zee Music Company

Sachin–Jigar chronology
Zara Hatke Zara Bachke (2023)	Aankh Micholi (2023)	Farrey (2023)

Official audio
- Aankh Micholi - Full Album on YouTube

The music of the film is composed by Sachin–Jigar while lyrics written by Jigar Saraiya, Priya Saraiya, Vayu and IP Singh.

Track listing
No.	Title	Lyrics	Singer(s)	Length
1.	"Kaleja Kad Ke"	Jigar Saraiya	Darshan Raval, Asees Kaur	3:16
2.	"Ve Dholna"	Priya Saraiya	Jonita Gandhi, Shashwat Singh	3:36
3.	"Shaadi Dope Hai"	Vayu	Dev Negi, Rakesh Maini, Nikhita Gandhi	4:39
4.	"Aankh Micholi"	IP Singh	Mika Singh, Mellow D	3:01
Total length:				14:32

== Reception ==
Bollywood Hungama rated the film with 1.5/5 stars and wrote "AANKH MICHOLI fails to induce laughs and is laced with a very bad climax. A film like this would be ideal for TV viewing and won’t stand a chance on the big screen. Bhavna Agarwal of India Today rated the film with 1.5/5 stars and wrote "At times, when comedies have gotten smarter with their writing, ‘Aankh Micholi’ seems like a misfit." Kartik Bhardwaj of The New Indian Express rated the film with 1.5/5 stars and commented "Peak-a-bore".

Deepa Gahlot of Rediff.com rated the film with 1.5/5 stars and called it a "Outdated Humour" and wrote "The biggest drawback is its very outdated look and humour, which even TV sitcoms have outgrown." Avinash Lohana of Pinkvilla rated the film with 1/5 stars and wrote "The overall screenplay and its treatment is highly mediocre, with most of the jokes not landing at all" "scenes are even cringy, especially the climax sequence which somehow makes no sense at all."
