= Meenakshi Sundareshwar =

2021 Indian romantic comedy film by Vivek Soni

- Official release poster
- Directed by: Vivek Soni
- Written by: Vivek Soni; Aarsh Vora
- Produced by: Karan Johar; Apoorva Mehta; Somen Mishra
- Starring: Sanya Malhotra; Abhimanyu Dassani
- Cinematography: Debojeet Ray
- Edited by: Prashanth Ramachandran
- Music by: Justin Prabhakaran
- Production company: Dharmatic Entertainment
- Distributed by: Netflix
- Release date: 5 November 2021
- Running time: 141 minutes
- Country: India
- Language: Hindi

Meenakshi Sundareshwar (Note: The title refers to Meenakshi Sundareshvarara Temple, one of the famous ancient temple, located in Madurai and also the names of the incarnations of Shiva and Parvati) is a 2021 Indian Hindi-language romantic comedy film directed by Vivek Soni, who co-wrote the script with Aarsh Vora and produced by Karan Johar, Apoorva Mehta and Somen Mishra, under the banner Dharmatic Entertainment, the digital arm of Johar's Dharma Productions. The film stars Sanya Malhotra and Abhimanyu Dassani as the titular characters, a newly-wed couple, who were forced to live apart due to a unique job prospect and struggles with the problems arising from their long-distance marriage.

The film which marked the directorial debut of Soni, was announced on 25 November 2020, with filming beginning on the same day, and was completed within February 2021. The film was shot in places across Karaikudi, Ooty, Mumbai and Bangalore. The film's cinematography and editing is handled by Debojeet Ray and Prashanth Ramachandran respectively. The music is composed by Justin Prabhakaran with lyrics written by Raj Shekhar.

Meenakshi Sundareshwar was premiered through the streaming service Netflix on 5 November 2021, coinciding with the Diwali festival. The film received mixed review from critics and audiences, who appreciated the performances and chemistry of Dassani and Malhotra, the musical score and soundtrack, setting, location picturisation and cinematography, but criticised the slow-paced and lengthy narration. The film, further received sharp criticism for the representation of Tamil people, which lacked authenticity and also being stereotypical.

At the 2022 Filmfare OTT Awards, Meenakshi Sundareshwar received 3 nominations – Best Web Original Film, Best Actress in a Web Original Film (Malhotra) and Best Actor in a Web Original Film (Dassani).

== Plot ==
Sundareshwar is an unemployed B. Tech graduate, who is uninterested in pursuing his father's saree business, and is determined to work in the Information technology sector. Under pressure from his family, he agrees to go and see a potential wife for him along with his family. Sundar and Meenakshi meet and after getting to know each other, they fall in love. It is revealed here that Sundar and his family came to the wrong house.

However, Meenakshi's Grandfather persuades the families to get Meenakshi and Sundareshwar married as the Hindu gods Meenakshi (Parvathi) and Sundareshwar (Shiva) are married and he believes that this is more than a coincidence. Per the Grandfather's wishes, Meenakshi and Sundareshwar have an arranged marriage in the Meenakshi Sundareshwar temple. Following his marriage, Sundareshwar receives an internship opportunity in Bangalore, causing him to leave his hometown and his wife Meenakshi. On his first day of Internship, Sundar learns that the company exclusively hires single employees leading him to pretend to be unmarried; hence, Meenakshi can't move with him.

The newlywed couple who barely know each other, struggle with the trials, tribulations, and insecurities of a long-distance relationship. Sundar, worried about Meenakshi's happiness lies about being lonely and sad which is completely not true. Meenakshi finds out that this is not the case when she decides to surprise Sundar on his birthday only to find him singing and dancing along with his friends. Hurt by this, Meenakshi leaves Sundar's apartment. The next morning, Sundar's father and nephew come along with Meenakshi to visit Sundar at his office. During this, Sundar's father learns that Sundar is a very talented engineer and forgives him for not pursuing their saree business. Sundar thanks Meenakshi as this wouldn't have happened without her. Meenakshi still heartbroken leaves Bangalore.

Sundar sends Meenakshi a video message apologizing and letting her know how much she means to him and how much he misses her, but due to low wifi connection, she is not able to view it. After a few days, Meenakshi's old classmate Ananthan asks her to be a part of his company by gifting her a saree from her father-in-law's saree shop. Meenakshi not knowing about the saree accepts and wears the saree the next day causing a miscommunication between her in-laws and herself. Meenakshi feels that she is not respected by Sundar's family, which leads to her leaving their house. She later speaks to her grandfather about her hardships and her grandfather advises her to meet Sundar and talk with him. Taking the advice from her grandfather, she gives their relationship one more shot. She texts Sundar that she will meet him the next day and Sundar's colleague messages her back without Sundar's knowledge.

He sends her a message to meet him at the location where Sundar's app presentation is taking place out of revenge from the first day. Sundar is shocked to see Meenakshi at his presentation as this could risk his job and yells at her. Meenakshi tearfully leaves and Sundar finds out that his colleague was behind all of this and runs to apologize to her, but she was long gone by then. Sundar leaves mid presentation to go see Meenakshi where he finds her at the late night premiere of Rajinikanth's Darbar (2020). She forgives Sundar and the film ends with them embracing each other.

== Cast ==
- Sanya Malhotra as G. Meenakshi
- Abhimanyu Dassani as Sundareshwar
- Shiv Kumar Subramaniam as Thatha
- Nivedita Bhargava as Rukmani Aththai
- Purnendu Bhattacharya as Mani
- Komal Chhabria as Suhasini
- Manoj Mani Mathew as Vaman
- Archana Iyer as Poojitha
- Ritika Shrotri as Mukai
- Kalp Shah as Rasu
- Saurabh Sharma as Tutor
- Mahesh Pillai as Ganapathy
- Sonali Sachdev as Samruddhi
- Varun Rao as Ananthan
- Sukhesh Arora as Senthil
- Chetan Sharma as Sai Kumar
- Khuman Nongyai as Diganta
- Haneeth Adicherla as Lanja

== Production ==
=== Development ===
In September 2019, Karan Johar announced the partnership of Dharmatic Entertainment, the digital arm of Johar's Dharma Productions, with Netflix to present their original contents. As a part of the deal, three films — the anthology drama Ghost Stories, Guilty and an untitled film with Vivek Soni was announced. On 25 November 2020, the aforementioned project was later titled as Meenakshi Sundareshwar, with Abhimanyu Dassani and Sanya Malhotra in the leading roles. The film set in Madurai, Tamil Nadu explores "a young couple and how they deal with trials and tribulations of life". Soni stated that "I love this genre of love stories and this theme of long-distance relationships is such a universal team, it's such a relatable theme, that was a reason I really wanted to explore it and wanted it to be the theme of my first film."

He further added about the setting and characterisation of the film, in an interview with Bollywood Hungama, saying: "The story organically blends into the setting of Madurai because the film is called Meenakshi Sundareshwar and the basic incident which happens in the family, the reason the both of them get married is because both their first names together make the famous temple of Madurai. In order to make it visually stand out, that is also one reason. Hindi films are not often set in South India, its great to visually explore that landscape that has not been milked before much."

=== Casting and filming ===
This is the debut film directorial of Vivek Soni. He earlier directed a short film Bawdi (2012), which received critical acclaim and was also featured as a segment in the anthology film Chaar Cutting (2015). He worked as an assistant director in the romantic-comedy film Hasee Toh Phasee (2014), produced by Johar's Dharma Productions and also co-ordinated visual effects for Ra.One (2011) and Vishwaroopam (2013). For the female lead role, Soni initially narrated the script to Alia Bhatt; he worked as an assistant director in Shaandaar (2015) and Udta Punjab (2016), which starred Bhatt. Despite, both the director and the actor being in touch, she could not play the role due to her commitments in several projects, which was offered to Sanya Malhotra. However, Bhatt, impressed by the scripting and characterisation, had contacted Johar to produce the project.

Both, Dassani and Malhotra play the titular characters in the film. Speaking about the characterisation of the leads, Malhotra stated, "Meenakshi and Sundareshwar are two very different personalities. Meenakshi is very confident, she's out there, she speaks her mind whereas Sundar is very reticent and shy. So, there is definitely a distance between these two [...] But what is endearing about their relationship is that despite being two opposite people, they don't want each other to change. They are ready to grow together and that's very special, I feel".

Principal photography began on 25 November 2020, the date of the film's announcement. It was initially set to begin in mid-March 2020, but was interrupted due to the COVID-19 lockdown in India. During the long period, Soni decided to work on the characterisation of the two leads. Dassani stated that "we [Dassani and Malhotra] had intense readings before we started shooting for the film. The film was actually supposed to be shot before the first lockdown. Half of the people (from the film's unit) had left Bombay to shoot for the first schedule but they were called back because the lockdown was happening [...] So, we got enough time during the lockdown to understand the characters and live with them for a while, which in this day and age is tough to do because we're moving on from one project to another". The shooting took places in three schedules: across Karaikudi, Ooty and Bangalore and wrapped on 10 February 2021.

== Soundtrack ==
The soundtrack and score were composed by Justin Prabhakaran, making his debut in Bollywood.

== Marketing and release ==
Meenakshi Sundareshwar was announced as a part of Netflix India's original programming for the 2021 slate. On 25 September 2021, a musical glimpse of the film was released at the Tudum Festival, a pop-culture fan event. Later, the team released a "matrimonial alliance promo" featuring the lead actors on 11 October 2021, with a teaser and a trailer from the film being unveiled on 12 and 21 October 2021. The film premiered on Netflix on 5 November 2021, coinciding with Diwali festival.

== Reception ==
On the review aggregator website Rotten Tomatoes, 40% of 15 critics' reviews are positive, with an average rating of 5.1/10.

Hiren Kotwani from The Times of India gave the film 3 stars out of 5 and stated "Director Vivek Soni has taken the road less travelled by opting for a subject like this, on long-distance relationships, and how the protagonists enjoy the few ups and cope with the many downs. However, it looks like they took the ‘long’ of the distance between the couple a bit too seriously and it reflects in the film's length. At times, the narrative drags and you wonder when it will get to the next point. And after that, it looks like the makers were in a hurry to resolve the conflict and quickly arrive at a solution before time runs out [...] Discounting the dragging parts, Meenakshi Sundareshwar is worth a watch for it's [sic] hatke subject of long-distance marriage, Sanya and Abhimanyu's effective performances, Justin Prabhakaran's fabulous soundtrack, and the right southern flavour for this Madurai and Bangalore based story." Shubhra Gupta from The Indian Express gave 2.5 stars out of 5 and said, "The film is not interested in either satirizing or sending up the whole arranged marriage thing. It is what it is, and it is the lived reality of millions of young Indians who live in their parental homes with their wives and children, squabbling and harmonising as they go along [...] But where the film falters is not giving us a believable conflict which becomes the sticking point between the couple forced into living apart, in two cities."

Editor-in-chief of The Hindu, Anuj Kumar, wrote that "It is a kind of film that won't keep you awake but provides talk-points for dinner table discussion [...] Had it been mounted as a comedy, we would have played along but here, the conceit and self-awareness are hard to ignore." Saibal Chatterjee from NDTV gave the film 2.5 stars (out of 5) and stated that "Meenakshi Sundareshwar would not have, like its two principal characters, needed either divine intervention or the love of Rajinikanth for its marriage of intention and execution to work, if the writing eschewed the laboured pre-climactic twists and demonstrated greater flair. Its inconsistencies and the inert stretches notwithstanding, Meenakshi Sundareshwar papers over at least some of its flaws with its beguiling simplicity." Anna M. M. Vetticad of Firstpost gave two stars out of five and wrote, "Meenakshi Sundareshwar has many of its nuts and bolts in place, but is lost to poor writing and to direction that confuses uneventfulness with realism, made worse by the inexorable running time. Even its goal of upholding one of the fixtures of Indian culture – the arranged marriage – remains unmet since it has no compelling arguments to offer. It may well be argued that this unquestioning acceptance of tradition accurately reflects most Indian homes. But if this film's aim was to romanticise tradition, then its lack of energy and spark makes it a really bad ad for arranged marriages."

Nandini Ramnath of Scroll.in wrote, "The film embraces the stereotype and then tries to subvert it with a zeal that can only be admired. It has read up on the broad elements that constitute community identity and then laid out its findings with full-blooded chutzpah." Anupama Chopra, editor-in-chief of Film Companion, stated the film as "an opposite to Haseen Dillruba, where the latter give us a twisted take on the aftermath of marrying a stranger, Meenakshi and Sundareshwar make a solid case for why it continues to be the preferred mode for so many young people", concluding it as "the film does not realise its full potential but it is sweet and undemanding enough".

Sukanya Verma, in her review for Rediff.com gave three stars saying, "Meenakshi Sundareshwar is a Basu Chatterjee slice-of-life packaged in a glossy ad film whose source of heart are its two genuinely likeable leads". In contrast, giving a rating of one-and-a-half stars out of five, Stutee Ghosh from The Quint, called it as a "snooze fest" and further wrote, "The most frustrating thing about Meenakshi Sundareshwar is that we keep waiting for something to happen and nothing ever does. Soni's determination to whip up complications where there are none and craft outlandish scenes that mean nothing in the larger scheme of things add to the discomfort."

== Accolades ==
Year	Award ceremony	Category	Nominee / work	Result	Ref.
2022	Filmfare OTT Awards	Best Web Original Film	Meenakshi Sundareshwar	Nominated	
2022	Filmfare OTT Awards	Best Actress in a Web Original Film	Sanya Malhotra	Nominated	
2022	Filmfare OTT Awards	Best Actor in a Web Original Film	Abhimanyu Dassani	Nominated	

== Controversy ==
The way we marginalise and stereotype communities in real life often get reflected in our cinema as well [...] We are undermining the way of life, the traditions, food and mannerisms of millions of people who are a part of India [...] Using broad brushstrokes to create cinema is a reason why representation remains such a huge issue in Bollywood.

— Saraswati Datar, a critic from The Indian Express on the stereotypical portrayal of Tamil Nadu people in Bollywood films, with the debate over Meenakshi Sundareshwar and the criticism on its inauthenticity.

Meenakshi Sundareshwar received criticism for the stereotypical portrayal of people living in Tamil Nadu. Although, the director, Vivek Soni and Abhimanyu Dassani initially dismissed on referencing to the "Tamil stereotypes" and claimed that they "did not insult any community in particular", cinephiles were worried about the inauthentic representation of Tamil Nadu people in the film and further called out for the same. Writing for The News Minute, Bharathy Singaravel who is a Chennai-based reviewer, criticised the film for the "Tamil stereotypes that Bollywood had subjected to, for several years", calling out the team for "the lack of research on how Tamil communities and their lifestyle is portrayed in Hindi films". Anuj Kumar of The Hindu, too concerned about the one-dimensional portrayal of Tamil people saying it is mostly due to the success of dubbed films from South India in the Hindi market pushed the makers to try something original, where a story set in the South Indian milieu is made into a Hindi film. But further said that "the storyline doesn't offer any reason as to why in a film set in Madurai, the heart of Tamil Nadu, South Indian characters are speaking in Hindi". A reviewer from Sify, called the film as a "modern and regressive" for the stereotypical portrayal and further went on to say "while you applaud Sanya Malhotra's name leading the credits (rightly so), you feel disappointed at the same old trope presented in a shiny, new wrapper".

Saraswati Datar of The Indian Express pointed out the inauthenticity of Tamil culture in the film, where "the characters are pulled out from the Dharma handbook on writing Tamilian characters". She compared the portrayal of Tamil culture in two different aspects, citing the second season of The Family Man web series, where the team had cast Tamil actors and including different Tamil dialects and questioning the responsibility of Dharma Productions on why it fails to "make even half the effort at authenticity". Avinash Ramachandran, a Chennai-based reviewer from Cinema Express, also criticised the stereotypes, but praised the other aspects, which made the film "having the potential to be a take on traditional relationships finding its standing in the modern way of life". Vandana Menon of ThePrint also stated it as "onslaught of stereotypes about South India", further saying, "It's a film about Tamil culture made by non-South Indians, who are extremely focused on convincing you otherwise. They attempt to do so by converting Tamil culture — and essentialising South Indian culture — into an 'aesthetic'. But in the process of creating it, the film lacks basics."

Tamil Nadu-based magazine, Ananda Vikatan, criticised the film for its stereotypic portrayal of Tamil culture. The writer went on to say that beyond Rajinikanth, filter coffee, Jigarthanda and people wearing Kanchipuram silk saris, Tamil Nadu is a lot more and has been since several years. They felt that except in the name of the title (Meenakshi Sundareshwar), there is nothing about Tamil in the film.

== Audience viewership ==
Upon release, Meenakshi Sundareshwar became the third-most watched film on Netflix with about 2.8 million views in the first week of its release, and has been trended at the first position in India, while being listed at one of the top-ten trending lists in several East Asian countries. It further became the fourth-most watched non-English films across the world within two weeks, and continued being one of the top ten non-English Netflix films in the world for three consecutive weeks. As of five weeks, the film has been viewed by 4.13 million households since its premiere, and became the third-top most viewed Hindi films on the streaming platform, only behind Dhamaka and Sooryavanshi.
