= Mard Ko Dard Nahi Hota =

2018 Indian film by Vasan Bala

- Theatrical release poster
- Directed by: Vasan Bala
- Written by: Vasan Bala
- Produced by: Ronnie Screwvala
- Starring: Abhimanyu Dassani; Radhika Madan; Gulshan Devaiah; Mahesh Manjrekar; Jimit Trivedi
- Cinematography: Jay I. Patel
- Edited by: Prerna Saigal
- Music by: Karan Kulkarni; Dipanjan Guha
- Production company: RSVP Movies
- Distributed by: RSVP Movies
- Release dates: 10 September 2018 (TIFF); 21 March 2019 (India)
- Running time: 138 minutes
- Country: India
- Language: Hindi
- Budget: ₹12 crore
- Box office: ₹2.03 crore (India) $22,094 (other)

Mard Ko Dard Nahi Hota (Hindi pronunciation: [məɾd̪ koː d̪əɾd̪ nəɦiː ɦoːt̪aː]), released internationally as The Man Who Feels No Pain, is a 2018 Indian Hindi-language action comedy film written and directed by Vasan Bala and produced by Ronnie Screwvala under his banner RSVP Movies. The film stars Abhimanyu Dassani in his acting debut, alongside Radhika Madan, Gulshan Devaiah, Mahesh Manjrekar and Jimit Trivedi. In the film, a young man, who has a rare condition called congenital analgesia, strikes out on a quest to vanquish his foes.

The film premiered in the Midnight Madness section of the 2018 Toronto International Film Festival, where it won the People's Choice Award: Midnight Madness. The film was also screened at the 2018 MAMI Film Festival where it received standing ovation.

Mard Ko Dard Nahi Hota was released on 21 March 2019 and received positive reviews from critics.

== Plot ==
Surya is diagnosed with congenital analgesia, a rare disorder that prevents him from feeling physical pain. After his mother is killed by chain snatchers shortly after his birth, he is raised by his paranoid father and eccentric maternal grandfather, Ajoba. Flashbacks show his mother dying instantly after falling from a motorbike, while the infant Surya remains unaffected. At school, Surya is relentlessly bullied because of his condition, though he befriends his neighbour Supri.

At home, Surya learns to treat his own injuries and develops an obsession with martial arts films through the VHS tapes provided by Ajoba. He becomes particularly fascinated by footage of a 100-man karate kumite performed by the mysterious one-legged fighter Karate Mani. Surya later attempts vigilantism by defending Supri from her abusive father, but the incident leads to their families being evicted and the children becoming separated.

As they grow older, both find unusual mentors. Ajoba secretly encourages Surya's martial arts training through VHS recordings, while Supri becomes a student of Karate Mani after accidentally meeting him. Surya grows into an awkward and sheltered young man because his father rarely allows him outside. When finally given freedom, he notices a poster featuring Karate Mani and follows it to the building where he and Supri were separated years earlier. Neither recognises the other, though Surya is impressed when Supri defeats several thugs.

Surya later visits Karate Mani, only to find him unconscious after an attack by his criminal twin brother Jimmy. Mani is taken to hospital, but escapes after regaining consciousness to avoid expensive treatment. Surya protects him from pursuing hospital staff, earning Mani's respect.

Mani explains that he and Jimmy were trained in karate by their father. Mani's natural talent and his sacrifice of a leg while saving Jimmy from a truck deepened their father's admiration for him, fuelling Jimmy's resentment. After Mani completed the 100-man kumite, his father gifted him a treasured locket. Jimmy eventually turned to crime. While Jimmy was imprisoned, Mani became involved with Jimmy's girlfriend, creating an irreparable rift and leaving Mani consumed by guilt.

Jimmy later establishes a security agency and repeatedly intimidates Mani, taking possessions from him whenever they meet. During one visit, he steals the locket. Surya vows to recover it despite Ajoba's fears. Meanwhile, Supri reveals that she is trapped in a relationship with her fiancé Atul, who pays for her mother's medical treatment and plans to take the family to Canada.

At the airport, Supri's mother urges her to escape Atul's controlling influence. She secretly helps Supri flee by overdosing on insulin after landing in Canada, ensuring she is hospitalised and distracting Atul. Supri heads to Jimmy's office, anticipating trouble from Surya and Mani. A violent fight erupts there, during which Surya's inability to feel pain makes him especially dangerous. Jimmy's men eventually trap them in a burning room, but Supri rescues them.

The group hide in their abandoned childhood housing complex until Jimmy captures them and forces them into a brutal series of one-on-one fights. Mani, Supri and Ajoba are defeated, while Surya overcomes nearly all of Jimmy's fighters despite suffering a broken leg. In the final match, Surya blinds his opponent with Mani's crutch and wins. Furious, Jimmy shoots and stabs him, but Supri intervenes, seizes the gun and kills Jimmy.

Surya later awakens at home, which has been converted into a hospital room. Mani takes responsibility for Jimmy's death and is imprisoned. Surya fulfils his father's dream by becoming a chartered accountant, while Supri's mother receives treatment in Canada. Freed from her obligations, Supri begins considering her own future and career, though she and Surya are ultimately shown embarking on a new adventure together.

== Cast ==
- Abhimanyu Dassani as Suryaanshu "Surya" Sampat
  - Sartaaj Kakkar as young Surya
- Radhika Madan as Supriya "Supri" Bhatnagar
  - Riva Arora as young Supri
- Gulshan Devaiah in a dual role as
  - Mani
  - Jimmy, Mani's evil twin
- Mahesh Manjrekar as Aajoba (grandpa), Surya's grandfather
- Jimit Trivedi as Jatin Sampat, Surya's father
- Shweta Basu Prasad as Surya's mother
- Elena Kazan as Nandini/Bridget Von Hammersmark

== Production ==
Director Vasan Bala said that in early 2016, a friend of his told him about a dentist whose patient did not ask for anaesthesia. This triggered the idea of the film to him. He then saw several documentaries and blended it with his childhood stories about martial arts. He said: "The story is about all the films that I grew up on, Bruce Lee, Jackie Chan [..] all the karate classes I had to take." Bala said that the film is a tribute to "all the films that we have seen." For the preparation of the role, Dassani trained for martial arts for three months before the audition. He also practised swimming, gymnastics, yoga, freehand training, stick fighting and studied human anatomy, injuries, and first aid. Action director and martial arts consultant Prateek Parmar made his acting debut with the film, he also served as the martial arts consultant. Dassani went through one-and-a-half month of auditions with other people. Devaiah learned karate while Madan and Dassani learned mixed martial arts. All of them went through almost eight months of training.

Madan mentioned that she was auditioning for Laila Majnu (2018) when she got to know about Mard Ko Dard Nahi Hota and chose the latter film because of its "uniqueness". She performed all the stunts herself and watched several classic action films for days to familiarise herself with the genre. She was also injured and bruised during the physical training; she also followed a strict diet and a daily routine of exercises.

== Marketing and release ==
The official theatrical poster of the film was unveiled on 11 February 2019. The film was released in theatres on 21 March 2019 by RSVP Movies in India, New Zealand, and Australia, and was also released later in Hong Kong, South Korea, Japan, and Taiwan.

The film only played on 375 screens in India due to a dispute with multiplex cinema companies. Producer Ronnie Screwvala claimed that four multiplex chains were imposing unnecessary fees to Hindi films, and he filed a grievance with the Competition Commission of India; in retaliation, INOX Leisure Limited would not play Mard Ko Dard Nahi Hota on any of its screens. These "Virtual Print Fees" originated in 2010 to help cinemas transition from film prints to digital, but have continued longer than they were supposed to.

=== Home media ===
The film became available as VOD on China's iQIYI on 4 April 2019, and on Netflix on 22 May 2019.

== Soundtrack ==
Mard Ko Dard Nahi Hota

Soundtrack album by Karan Kulkarni and Dipanjan Guha
- Released: 11 March 2019
- Recorded: 2017–18
- Genre: Feature film soundtrack
- Length: 24:57
- Language: Hindi
- Label: Zee Music Company
External audio
- Audio Jukebox on YouTube

Karan Kulkarni chronology
Aligarh (2015)	Mard Ko Dard Nahi Hota (2019)

The music of the film is composed by Karan Kulkarni and Dipanjan Guha while the lyrics are penned by Garima Obrah, Karan Kulkarni, Shantanu Ghatak and Hussain Haidry.

Track listing
No.	Title	Lyrics	Singer(s)	Length
1.	"Rappan Rappi Rap"	Garima Obrah	Benny Dayal	3:54
2.	"Kitthon Da Tu Superstar"	Garima Obrah, Karan Kulkarni	Sanj V, Karan Kulkarni	2:44
3.	"Tere Liye"	Shantanu Ghatak	Kamakshi Rai, Vishal Mishra, Karan Kulkarni	3:49
4.	"Nakhrewaali"	Garima Obrah, Hussain Haidry	Karan Kulkarni, Saba Azad	3:37
5.	"Life Mein Fair Chance Kiska"	Garima Obrah	Suresh Triveni, Surya Ragunaathan, Veera Fauzia Saxena	3:25
6.	"Dreamtime"	Garima Obrah	Kamakshi Rai	2:24
7.	"Shaolin Sky"	Karan Kulkarni	Karan Kulkarni	2:35
8.	"Kitthon Da Tu Superstar" (music by Karan Kulkarni and Dipanjan Guha)	Garima Obrah	Sanj V	2:29
Total length:				24:57

== Reception ==
=== Critical response ===
On Rotten Tomatoes, the film has scored 94% based on 18 reviews with an average rating of 6.9/10. Rafael Motamayor of Bloody Disgusting called the film "India's highly entertaining answer to Deadpool". J. Hurtado of Screen Anarchy wrote "In this boisterous action comedy, Bala's passions and obsessions are writ large across the screen with a genuine affection that is hard to deny." He later included it in his list of 14 Favorite Indian Films of 2018.

Joe Leydon of Variety wrote "Vasan Bala's action-adventure fantasy pivots on the efforts of a young man eager to transcend his limitations to become a martial-arts hero." Nandini Ramnath of Scroll wrote "Vasan Bala's action comedy, which he has also written, plays out at the intersection of cinephilia, nostalgia and mischief." Shikhar Verma of High On Films writes, "Vasan Bala's film has endearing characters who all call for a big celebratory leap forward for conventional Hindi films; but the entire arc that comes along with the self-awareness lacks real oomph or glow."

Stephen Dalton of The Hollywood Reporter called it a "fun ride, unashamedly zany and eager to please, even if the humor is very broad and the sprawling plot too baggy for an action-driven piece." Rahul Desai of Film Companion called it "a Whimsically joyful ode to a life of movies."

Raja Sen of Hindustan Times gave 4/5 stars and described the film as the most entertaining action movie in decades. Pradeep Menon of Firstpost gave 3/5 stars and wrote "Mard Ko Dard Nahi Hota remains watchable throughout, despite shaky foundation, precisely because it gives us an experience we rarely see in Indian cinema." Devesh Sharma of Filmfare gave 3/5 stars and wrote "All-all-all, the film's gags don't travel well outside the context. It's one of those -- ‘you’ve to be there’—kind of films. But within those two hours, you'll surely laugh your head off."

=== Awards and nominations ===
Award	Category	Recipient(s)	Result	Ref(s)
2018 Toronto International Film Festival	People's Choice Award: Midnight Madness	Vasan Bala	Won	
26th Screen Awards	Best Supporting Actor	Gulshan Devaiah	Won	
65th Filmfare Awards	Best Male Debut	Abhimanyu Dassani	Won	
65th Filmfare Awards	Best Actress (Critics)	Radhika Madan	Nominated	
65th Filmfare Awards	Best Supporting Actor	Gulshan Devaiah	Nominated	
65th Filmfare Awards	Best Film (Critics)	Vasan Bala	Nominated	
65th Filmfare Awards	Best Story	Vasan Bala	Nominated	
65th Filmfare Awards	Best Background Score	Karan Kulkarni	Nominated	
65th Filmfare Awards	Best Cinematography	Jay Patel	Nominated	
65th Filmfare Awards	Best Action	Eric Jacobus; Anand Shetty	Nominated	
65th Filmfare Awards	Best Special Effects	Lavan Prakashan; Kushan Prakashan	Nominated	
