= Screen Award for Best Actress (Critics) =

Film award in India

Screen Critics Award for Best Actress
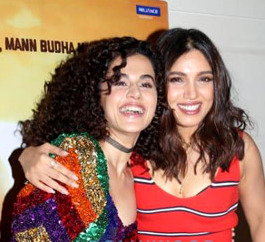
- The 2020 recipients: Taapsee Pannu & Bhumi Pednekar
- Awarded for: Best Performance by an Actress in a Leading Role
- Country: India
- Presented by: Screen
- First award: Ayesha Takia, Dor (2007)
- Currently held by: Taapsee Pannu and Bhumi Pednekar, Saand Ki Aankh (2020)

The Screen Award for Best Actress (Critics) is an Indian cinema award.

== Winners ==
Year	Winner	Film
2007	Ayesha Takia	Dor
2008	Tabu	Cheeni Kum
2016	Kalki Koechlin	Margarita with a Straw
2017	Swara Bhaskar	Nil Battey Sannata
2018	Konkona Sen Sharma	Lipstick Under My Burkha
2019	Neena Gupta	Badhaai Ho

- Winners are listed first in bold, followed by the other nominees.
- **2020**– **Taapsee Pannu** (tied with) **Bhumi Pednekar – Saand Ki Aankh**
  - Priyanka Chopra – The Sky Is Pink
  - Bhumi Pednekar – Bala
  - Richa Chadda – Section 375

== See also ==
- Screen Awards
- Bollywood
- Cinema of India
