= Aisha Chaudhary =

Indian author, motivational speaker (1996–2015)

Aisha Kaur Chaudhary
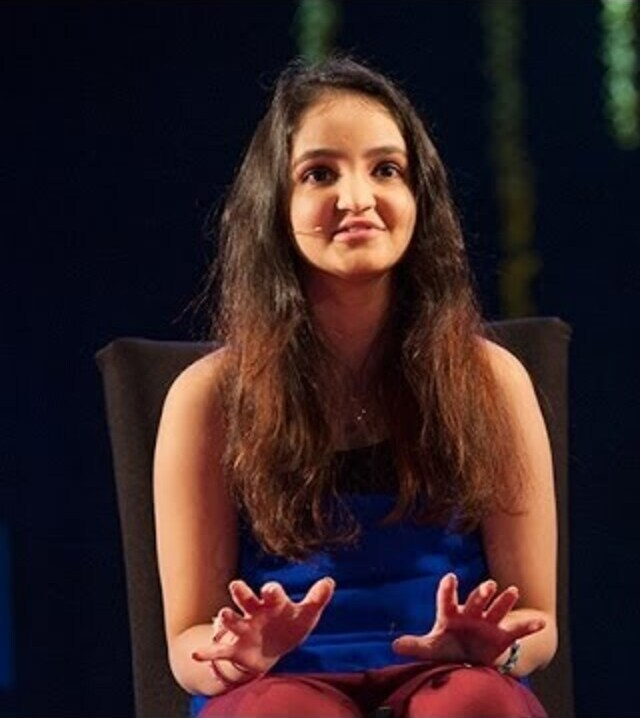
- Chaudhary at TEDx Pune in 2013
- Born: 27 March 1996; New Delhi, Delhi, India
- Died: 24 January 2015 (aged 18); Gurugram, Haryana, India
- Cause of death: Pulmonary fibrosis
- Education: American Embassy School
- Occupations: Author; motivational speaker
- Known for: Motivation Speeches at INK Conference; My Little Epiphanies (2015)

Aisha Chaudhary (27 March 1996 – 24 January 2015) was an Indian author and motivational speaker. She is the author of the book My Little Epiphanies, published one day before her death. The 2019 Hindi film The Sky Is Pink is based on her life.

== Early life ==
Chaudhary was the daughter of Niren Chaudhary, who later became the president of South Asia operations of Yum! Brands and Panera Bread. Her mother, Aditi, was a mental healthcare worker. She had an elder brother named Ishan Chaudhary and an elder sister Tanya Chaudhary, who died at the age of seven months. Chaudhary was born with severe combined immunodeficiency (SCID). When she was six months old, underwent a bone marrow transplant as treatment. In 2009, she developed pulmonary fibrosis – a type of irreversible scarring of the lungs as a side effect of the chemotherapy used for her SCID.

== Career ==
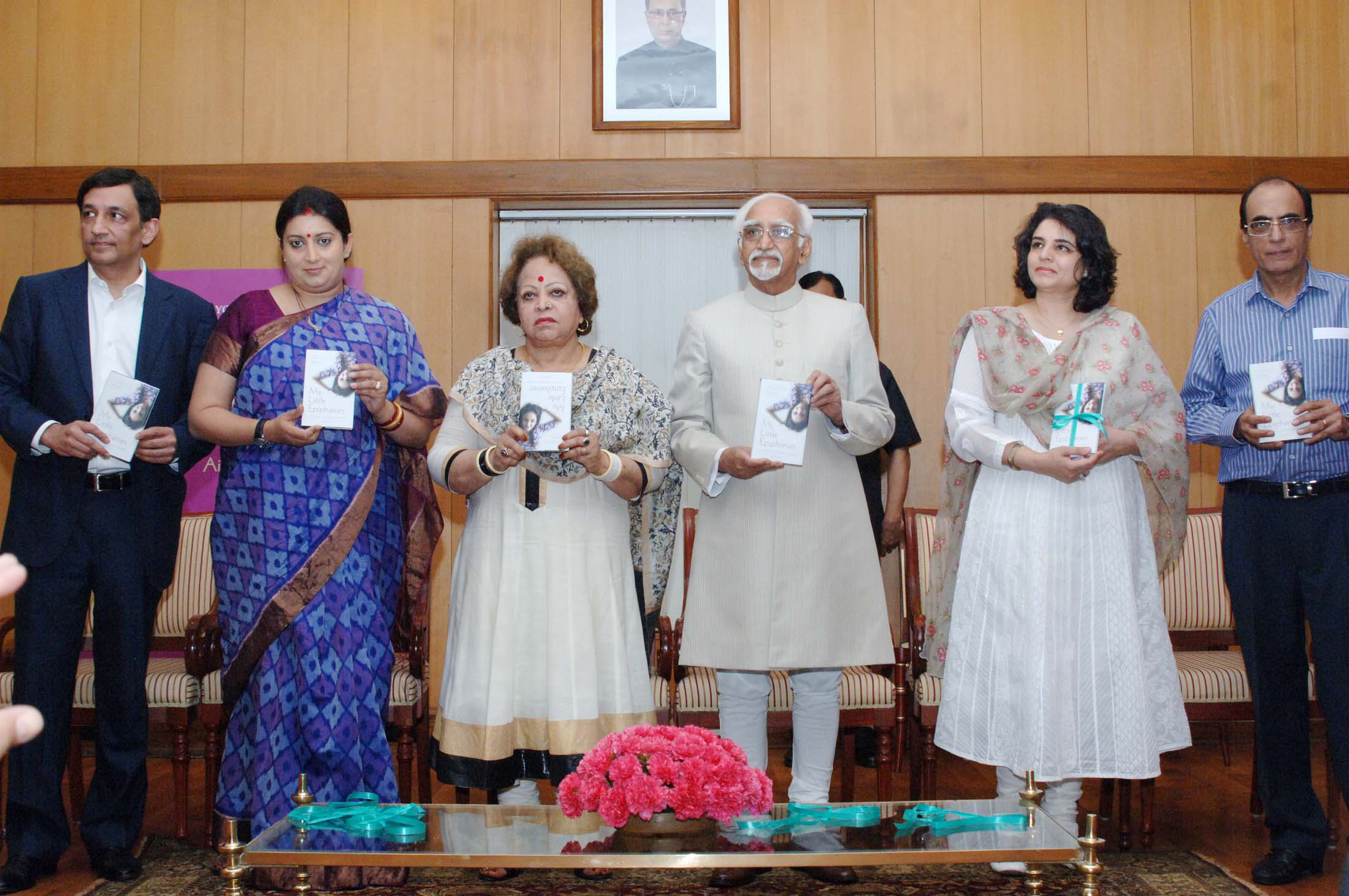
Former Vice President of India Mohammad Hamid Ansari releasing My Little Epiphanies in New Delhi on 13 April 2015. Salma Ansari and the former Minister of Human Resource Development Smriti Irani are also seen

Chaudhary gave inspirational talks from age 15 to the time of her death. She was named an INK Fellow and spoke in the 2011 and 2013 INK Conferences. Chaudhary was also a speaker at TEDxPune in 2013.

She wrote a book that was published one day before her death.

== Representation in other media ==
The Sky Is Pink, a film based on her life, directed by Shonali Bose and starring Priyanka Chopra as Aditi Chaudhary, Farhan Akhtar as Niren Chaudhary, Zaira Wasim as Aisha Chaudhary and Rohit Suresh Saraf as Ishan Chaudhary, was released theatrically on 11 October 2019.

The documentary, Black Sunshine Baby on Netflix, is about her life.

== Works ==
- My Little Epiphanies (2015) which included her thoughts about life and also wanted people to know about her journey that could help others going through such hardships in life.
