= Ewan Mulligan =

British cinematographer

- Notable work: Article 15 (2019)
- Website: ewanmulligan.com

Ewan Mulligan is a British cinematographer known for his collaborations with Indian filmmaker Anubhav Sinha.

== Career ==
Article 15 marks Mulligan's fourth collaboration with Anubhav Sinha. Their latest collaboration, Article 15, released on June 28, 2019. The film received positive reviews, with particular praise for its visual style and the way it captured the narrative's social themes. Ewan and his crew predominantly shot the film during the early hours of the morning and evening to create a sense of unreality and transition, reflecting the characters' perpetual state of liminality.

== Filmography ==
- Note: all films are in Hindi, except where noted.

As cinematographer
Year	Film	Notes
2011	Ra.One	
2016	Zombie Spring Breakers	English film
2016	Tum Bin 2	
2018	Mulk	
2019	Article 15	Best Cinematographer - FC Film Club Awards 2020
2020	London Confidential	
2021	Tuesdays and Fridays	
2022	Anek	
2023	Kaala Paani	Nominated for Best Cinematographer (Series) - Filmfare OTT Awards
2024	IC 814: The Kandahar Hijack	
2026	Assi	
