= Anek =

2022 film directed by Anubhav Sinha

- Theatrical release poster
- Directed by: Anubhav Sinha
- Written by: Anubhav Sinha; Sima Agarwal; Yash Keswani
- Produced by: Bhushan Kumar; Krishan Kumar; Anubhav Sinha
- Starring: Ayushmann Khurrana; Manoj Pahwa; Kumud Mishra; Andrea Kevichüsa; J.D. Chakravarthy
- Cinematography: Ewan Mulligan
- Edited by: Yasha Ramchandani
- Music by: Songs: Anurag Saikia; Background Score: Mangesh Dhakde
- Production companies: T-Series; Benaras Media Works
- Distributed by: AA Films
- Release date: 27 May 2022
- Running time: 147 minutes
- Country: India
- Language: Hindi
- Budget: ₹40 crore
- Box office: ₹11.10 crore

Anek (transl. Many) is a 2022 Indian Hindi-language action thriller film written and directed by Anubhav Sinha who also co-produced it with T-Series. It stars Ayushmann Khurrana, Andrea Kevichüsa, Manoj Pahwa, Kumud Mishra and J. D. Chakravarthy.

Anek revolves around a police official sent as a secret agent to Northeast India to bring a peace deal between the government and the separatist groups in the North East, who want to break away from India. Anek was released in cinemas worldwide on 27 May 2022 to mixed reviews.

== Cast ==
- Ayushmann Khurrana as Agent Aman / Joshua
- Andrea Kevichüsa as Aido
- Manoj Pahwa as Abrar
- Kumud Mishra as Abrar's boss
- J. D. Chakravarthy as Anjaiyyah Bellamkonda IPS
- Loitongbam Dorendra Singh as Tiger Sangha
- Thejasevor Belho as Niko
- Rajib Kro as Johnson
- Sheila Devi as Emma
- Meenakshi as Gopa

== Production ==
Filming began in February 2021 and continued extensively throughout parts of northeastern India and wrapped up within March 2021.

== Music ==
Anek

Soundtrack album by Anurag Saikia
- Released: 7 June 2022
- Recorded: 2021–2022
- Genre: Feature film soundtrack
- Length: 15:51
- Languages: Hindi; Nagamese; English
- Label: T-Series
- Producer: Anurag Saikia

The music rights of the film are owned by T-Series. The music of the film is composed by Anurag Saikia. The first single was released on 24 May 2022.

Original tracklist
No.	Title	Lyrics	Singer(s)	Length
1.	"Voice of Anek"	Shakeel Azmi	Sunidhi Chauhan, Vivek Hariharan, Anurag Saikia	3:48
2.	"Oh Ku Takum"	Jonathan Lemtur	Imnanungsang Tzudir, Temsuwapang Aiee	2:23
3.	"Shaal Wunga"	Basharat Peer	Noor Mohammad Shah, Muntazir Faraz	2:38
4.	"Oh Mama"	Anurag Saikia	Neha Karode, Anurag Saikia	4:02
5.	"Rabbit (Cafe Song)"	Anurag Saikia	Neha Karode	3:02
Total length:				15:51

== Release ==
=== Theatrical ===
The film was released in theatres worldwide on 27 May 2022.

=== Home media ===
The digital streaming rights of the film is owned by Netflix. The film streamed on Netflix from 26 June 2022.

== Reception ==
Anek received mixed reviews from critics, with praise for the performances and timely themes, but criticism for its screenplay and direction. On the review aggregator website Rotten Tomatoes, 67% of 6 critics' reviews are positive, with an average rating of 5.8/10.

A critic for The Times of India rated the film 4 out of 5 stars and wrote, "Anek, through its runtime, draws subtle parallels between the northeast and other parts of the country, in particular Jammu and Kashmir." Tina Das of The Print rated the film 4 out of 5 stars and wrote, "Anek manages to showcase the complex layers of the insurgency in the Northeast, and it does that well." Phuong Le of The Guardian rated the film 4 out of 5 stars and wrote, "Anek is a rare commercial film that spotlights Northeastern Indian stories, and goes out of its way to refuse to condemn guerrilla fighters as terrorists." Devesh Sharma of Filmfare rated the film 3.5 out of 5 stars and wrote, "The political message packs a punch, its power is somewhat diminished by the execution and the writing, which is rusty in places." Navneet Vyasan of News 18 rated the film 3 out of 5 stars and wrote, "If it wasn't for its cast, Anubhav Sinha's directorial 'Anek' would've been a test of your patience. Thankfully, it isn't." Swati Chopra of The Quint rated the film 3 out of 5 stars and wrote, "Anek is preachy in parts, but the film has its heart in the right place and it could have done better if the film didn't feel rushed, leading to less clarity." Fengyen Chiu of Mashable rated the film 3 out of 5 stars and wrote, "Anek tries very hard to bring forth the problems of North-east people in India but the message doesn't quite reach properly."

Nandini Ramnath of Scroll.in rated the film 2.5 out of 5 stars and wrote, "Anek is sharper playing principled dissenter than uninvited saviour of the North East." Sukanya Verma of Rediff rated the film 2.5 out of 5 stars and wrote, "There's too much going on in Anek, and a lot of it is terribly disjointed." Shubhra Gupta of The Indian Express rated the film 2.5 out of 5 stars and wrote, "Ayushmann Khurrana and the film stay woolly, being careful to stay in the middle of the while-on-the-one-side, but-also tightrope. Anubhav Sinha dips his toe into relatively unexplored territory, with mixed results." Bharathi Pradhan of Lehren rated the film 2.5 out of 5 stars and wrote, "The cinematic effort to mainstream the North-East, ends up in a mess that further alienates instead of integrating." Anna M. M. Vetticad of Firstpost rated the film 2 out of 5 stars and wrote, "Visually spectacular, politically blurred, well-meaning and yet Anek fails to reach out across the barrier of the screen." Umesh Punwani of Koimoi rated the film 2 out of 5 stars and wrote, "Anubhav Sinha had so much to showcase, but he chose the wrong platform to do so." Monika Rawal Kukreja of The Hindustan Times stated, "Anubhav Sinha's latest political-social drama starring Ayushmann Khurrana fails to keep up with the expectations sets by Thappad, Mulk, Article 15."

== Accolades ==
Year (Note: Refers to the year in which the ceremony was held.)	Award	Category	Recipient(s)	Result	Ref.
2023	68th Filmfare Awards	Best Female Debut	Andrea Kevichüsa	Won	
2023	68th Filmfare Awards	Best Cinematography	Ewan Mulligan	Nominated	
2023	68th Filmfare Awards	Best Sound Design	Kaamod L Kharde	Nominated	
2023	68th Filmfare Awards	Best Background Score	Mangesh Dhakde	Nominated	

== See also ==
- List of Hindi films of 2022
