= 21st IIFA Awards =

Cancelled award ceremony

- Date: 24 November 2021

Highlights
- Best Film: Kabir Singh
- Best Direction: Aditya Dhar (Uri: The Surgical Strike)
- Best Actor: Shahid Kapoor (Kabir Singh)
- Best Actress: Alia Bhatt (Gully Boy)
- Most awards: Gully Boy (6)
- Most nominations: Gully Boy (17)

The 21st International Indian Film Academy Awards were supposed to take place in Indore from 27 to 29 March 2020. Due to the COVID-19 pandemic, they were postponed. However, on 24 November 2021, the IIFA organising team declared the name of winners of all categories through their Instagram handle.

The following is a list of nominees, technical award winners and popular award winners.

Gully Boy led the ceremony with 17 nominations, followed by Article 15 and Kabir Singh with 8 nominations each, and Uri: The Surgical Strike and War with 6 nominations each.

Gully Boy won 6 awards, including Best Actress (for Alia Bhatt) and Best Supporting Actor (for Siddhant Chaturvedi), thus becoming the most-awarded film at the ceremony.

== Winners and nominees ==
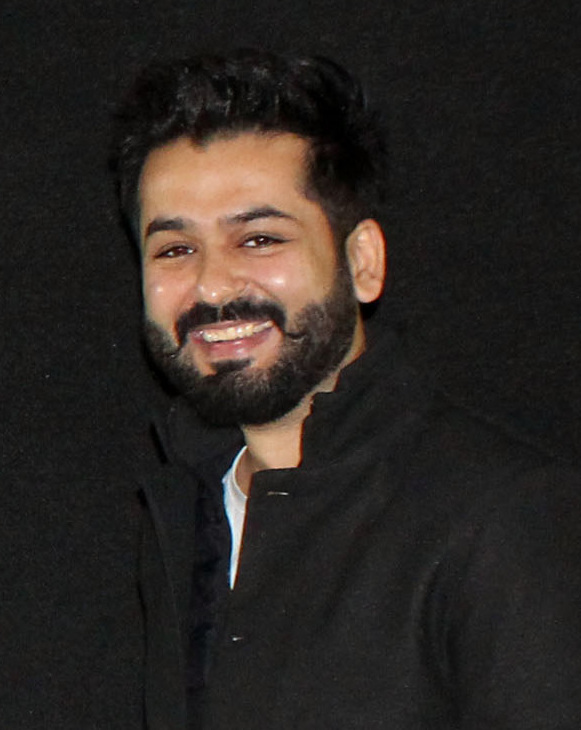
Aditya Dhar – Best Director winner

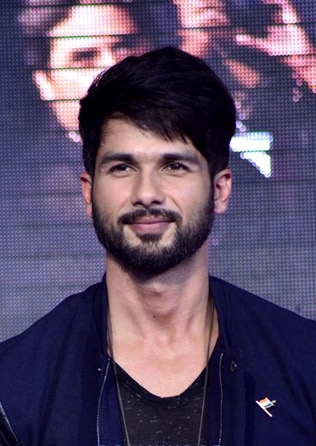
Shahid Kapoor – Best Actor winner

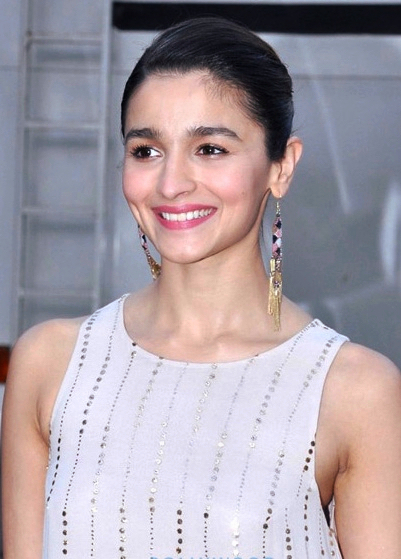
Alia Bhatt – Best Actress winner

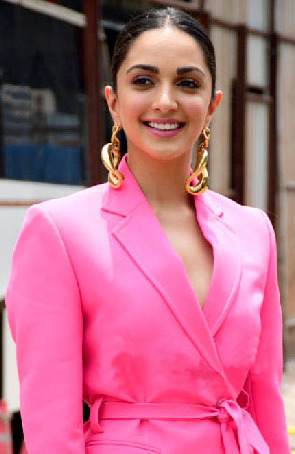
Kiara Advani – Best Supporting Actress winner

=== Awards ===
| Best Film | Best Director |
| Kabir Singh – Bhushan Kumar, Krishan Kumar Murad Khetani and Ashwin Varde; Article 15 – Anubhav Sinha; Gully Boy – Farhan Akhtar, Zoya Akhtar and Ritesh Sidhwani; Kesari – Karan Johar, Akshay Kumar, Apoorva Mehta and Sunir Khetarpal; Uri: The Surgical Strike —Ronnie Screwvala | Aditya Dhar – Uri: The Surgical Strike; Anubhav Sinha – Article 15; Sandeep Reddy Vanga – Kabir Singh; Sujoy Ghosh – Badla; Zoya Akhtar – Gully Boy |
| Best Actor | Best Actress |
| Shahid Kapoor – Kabir Singh; Ayushmann Khurrana – Article 15; Hrithik Roshan – Super 30; Ranveer Singh – Gully Boy; Vicky Kaushal – Uri: The Surgical Strike | Alia Bhatt – Gully Boy; Kareena Kapoor – Good Newwz; Priyanka Chopra – The Sky Is Pink; Taapsee Pannu – Badla; Vidya Balan – Mission Mangal |
| Best Supporting Actor | Best Supporting Actress |
| Siddhant Chaturvedi – Gully Boy; Diljit Dosanjh – Good Newwz; Kumud Mishra – Article 15; Vijay Varma – Gully Boy; Vishal Jethwa – Mardaani 2 | Kiara Advani – Good Newwz; Amrita Singh – Badla; Amruta Subhash – Gully Boy; Sayani Gupta – Article 15; Yami Gautam – Bala |
| Star Debut of the Year – Male | Star Debut of the Year – Female |
| Abhimanyu Dassani – Mard Ko Dard Nahi Hota | Ananya Panday – Student of the Year 2 |

=== Music Awards ===
| Best Music Director | Best Lyricist |
| Kabir Singh – Mithoon, Amaal Mallik, Vishal Mishra, Sachet–Parampara and Akhil Sachdeva; Gully Boy – Divine, Naezy, Dub Sharma, Ankur Tewari, Spitfire, Sez on the Beat, Rishi Rich, Raghu Dixit, Midival Punditz, Karsh Kale, Chandrashekhar Kunder, Jasleen Royal, Mickey McCleary, Ace, Ishq Bector, Prem-Hardeep, Viveick Rajagopalan and Kaam Bhaari; Kesari – Tanishk Bagchi, Arko Pravo Mukherjee, Chirantan Bhatt, Jasbir Jassi, Gurmoh and Jasleen Royal; Marjaavaan – Tanishk Bagchi, Meet Bros, Payal Dev, Yo Yo Honey Singh, Aditya Dev and Sanjoy Chowdhury; War – Vishal–Shekhar | Manoj Muntashir – "Teri Mitti" – Kesari; Divine & Ankur Tewari – "Apna Time Aayega" – Gully Boy; Divine & Naezy – "Mere Gully Mein" – Gully Boy; Irshad Kamil – "Bekhayali" – Kabir Singh; Kumaar – "Tera Ban Jaunga" – Kabir Singh |
| Best Male Playback Singer | Best Female Playback Singer |
| Arijit Singh – "Ghungroo" – War; Arijit Singh – "Dil Hi Toh Hai" – The Sky Is Pink; B Praak – "Teri Mitti" – Kesari; Ranveer Singh, Divine & Naezy – "Mere Gully Mein" – Gully Boy; Sachet Tandon – "Bekhayali" – Kabir Singh | Shreya Ghoshal – "Yeh Aaina" – Kabir Singh; Aakanksha Sharma – "Naina Yeh" – Article 15; Jasleen Royal – "Jahan Tu Chala" – Gully Boy; Shilpa Rao – "Ghungroo" – War; Vibha Saraf – "Kab Se Kab Tak" – Gully Boy |

=== Technical Awards ===
| Best Story | Best Dialogue |
| Reema Kagti & Zoya Akhtar – Gully Boy; Aditya Dhar – Uri: The Surgical Strike; Anubhav Sinha & Gaurav Solanki – Article 15; Nitesh Tiwari, Nikhil Mehrotra & Piyush Gupta – Chhichhore; Sanjiv Dutta – Super 30 | Vijay Maurya – Gully Boy |
| Best Screenplay | Best Editing |
| Anubhav Sinha & Gaurav Solanki – Article 15 | Nitin Baid – Gully Boy |
| Best Cinematography | Best Choreography |
| Jay Oza – Gully Boy | Bosco–Caesar & Tushar Kalia – "Ghunghroo" – War |
| Best Background Score | Best Special Effects |
| Shashwat Sachdev – Uri: The Surgical Strike | YFX (YRF Studios) – War |
| Best Sound Design | Best Sound Mixing |
| Bishwadeep Dipak Chatterjee & Ravi Soni – Uri: The Surgical Strike | Ravi Soni – Uri: The Surgical Strike |

== Superlatives ==
Films that received multiple nominations
| Nominations | Film |
|---|---|
| 17 | Gully Boy |
| 8 | Article 15 |
| 8 | Kabir Singh |
| 6 | Uri: The Surgical Strike |
| 6 | War |
| 4 | Kesari |
| 3 | Badla |
| 3 | Good Newwz |
| 2 | Super 30 |
| 2 | The Sky Is Pink |

Films that received multiple awards
| Nominations | Film |
|---|---|
| 6 | Gully Boy |
| 4 | Kabir Singh |
| 4 | War |
| 3 | Uri: The Surgical Strike |
