= Mohammed Zeeshan Ayyub =

Indian Hindi film actor

Mohammad Zeeshan Ayyub
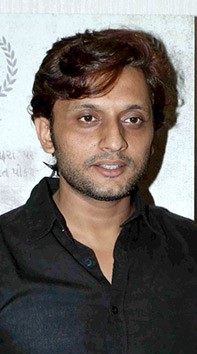
- Ayyub in 2017
- Born: Mohammad Zeeshan Ayyub Khan; Delhi, India
- Education: Kirori Mal College; National School of Drama
- Occupations: Actor; television presenter
- Years active: 2011–present
- Spouse: Rasika Agashe (m. 2007)
- Children: 1

Mohammad Zeeshan Ayyub Khan is an Indian actor who appears in Hindi films. He is frequently cast in supporting roles, and has appeared in more than 25 films in a career which has spanned fourteen years. He has also worked in a Hindi serial Kyunki... Jeena Isi Ka Naam Hai which was telecast on Doordarshan in 2008. He has collaborated with director Aanand L. Rai on four films.

Ayyub began his film career with a negative role in Raj Kumar Gupta's financially successful semi-biographical thriller No One Killed Jessica (2011), which earned him a nomination for the Filmfare Award for Best Male Debut. Subsequently, he featured briefly in the box-office hits Mere Brother Ki Dulhan (2011), Jannat 2 (2012), Raanjhanaa (2013), Shahid (2013), Raja Natwarlal (2014), Tubelight (2017), Manikarnika: The Queen of Jhansi (2019), and Article 15 (2019). Ayyub had his biggest commercial successes with brief roles in the romantic comedy Tanu Weds Manu: Returns (2015), the crime thriller Raees (2017), and the science drama film Mission Mangal (2019), all of which rank among the highest-grossing Indian films of all time.

== Early and personal life ==
Ayyub graduated from Kirori Mal College and completed his theatre training from National School of Drama (NSD), Delhi in 2006. He married Rasika Agashe in 2007 and they have a daughter.

== Acting career ==
=== Early work (2011–13) ===
Ayyub made his acting debut with Raj Kumar Gupta's biographical thriller No One Killed Jessica (2011), which also starred Vidya Balan and Rani Mukerji. Based on the murder case of Jessica Lal, the film saw Ayyub portray the real-life character of Manu Sharma, Jessica's true murderer. The film, as well as his performance, generated positive reviews from critics. With earnings of over ₹1 billion (US$10 million), No One Killed Jessica emerged as a critical and commercial success, and garnered him nominations for the Filmfare Award for Best Male Debut and the Zee Cine Award for Best Performance in a Negative Role. In his second release of the year, Ayyub appeared in Ali Abbas Zafar's directorial debut—the romantic comedy Mere Brother Ki Dulhan, about a man who finds a bride for his elder brother but falls in love with her instead. Co-starring alongside Katrina Kaif, Imran Khan, and Ali Zafar, he played the role of Khan's friend. Mere Brother Ki Dulhan proved his second consecutive box-office hit and earned over ₹760 million (US$7.9 million) worldwide. In 2011, he also appeared in a cameo role for the successful romantic comedy Tanu Weds Manu, which marked the first of his four films with Aanand L. Rai.

In 2012, Ayyub took another supporting role—this time in Kunal Deshmukh's thriller Jannat 2, co-starring Emraan Hashmi, Esha Gupta, and Randeep Hooda. Initially titled Informer, its title was changed to Jannat 2, making it a sequel to Jannat (2008). The film garnered a mixed critical reception, but eventually emerged as a financial success with global earnings of over ₹680 million (US$7.1 million), becoming Ayyub's fourth consecutive box office hit.

Ayyub next appeared in Aanand L. Rai's romantic drama Raanjhanaa (2013), alongside Dhanush, Sonam Kapoor, and Abhay Deol, in which he played the character of Dhanush's friend. The feature received mostly positive reviews and proved to be a major commercial success with a worldwide revenue of more than ₹1.13 billion (US$12 million). In his next film—Hansal Mehta's National Film Award-winning biographical drama Shahid, starring Rajkummar Rao as slain lawyer and human rights activist Shahid Azmi—Ayyub played Arif Azmi who is Azmi's brother. The film generated overwhelmingly mixed reviews though became commercially successful at the box office.

=== Career struggles, Tanu Weds Manu 2, and hiatus (2014–15) ===
In 2014, Ayyub reteamed with Kunal Deshmukh in the action comedy Raja Natwarlal, which starred Emraan Hashmi as the titular protagonist. The film received positive reactions but turned out to be a major box-office failure, grossing ₹295 million (US$3.1 million) on a budget of ₹417 million (US$4.3 million), and generated unfavourable profits for Ayyub's performance.

In 2015, Ayyub appeared in four films, the first of which was Abhishek Dogra's directorial debut—the comedy Dolly Ki Doli, co-starring Sonam Kapoor, Pulkit Samrat, Rajkummar Rao, and Varun Sharma. The film, about a woman who marries men from different religions and runs with their wealth on the wedding night, received moderate reviews and was average at the box office. Ayyub's next two releases were the action comedy All is Well and the spy thriller Phantom, both of which were also box office failures. His final release of the year was a second collaboration with Aanand L. Rai in Tanu Weds Manu: Returns, a romantic comedy that served as a sequel to Tanu Weds Manu (2011). Ayyub featured as Chintu Kumar Singh, a lawyer and an admirer of the titular protagonist (played by Kangana Ranaut). Unlike the actor's previous four films, it emerged as a huge commercial success grossing over ₹1 billion (US$10 million) in India and over ₹2 billion (US$21 million) worldwide, making it among Ayyub's highest-grossing releases.

=== Raees, Tubelight, and work in unsuccessful expensive films (2017–18) ===
After a two-year absence from full-time acting, Ayyub appeared in Rahul Dholakia's crime drama Raees (2017), in which he starred alongside Shah Rukh Khan, Nawazuddin Siddiqui, and Mahira Khan, and played the friend of the titular anti-hero, played by Khan. Said to be based on the life of criminal Abdul Latif, Raees generated mixed to positive reviews from critics. But with grossings of over ₹3 billion (US$31 million) worldwide, it proved to be Ayyub's highest-grossing release and one of the highest-grossing Indian films of all time. He next appeared in Kabir Khan's war drama Tubelight, portraying the role of Salman Khan's friend. Commercially, Tubelight turned out to be a success and collected a total of ₹2.11 billion (US$22 million). In his final release of the year, Ayyub played his first leading and the title role in Dakxin Chhara's directorial debut—the action drama Sameer—another box office disappointment.

In 2018, Ayyub acted in Vijay Krishna Acharya's period adventure action drama Thugs of Hindostan and Aanand L. Rai's comedy-drama Zero, both of which were among the list of the most expensive Hindi films having a budget of ₹2 billion (US$21 million), and with a budget of ₹2.40 billion (US$25 million), the former ranks as the most expensive Hindi film. Both the films generated mixed reviews and failed at both the Indian and overseas box office, thus making 2018 an unsuccessful year in Ayyub's career.

=== Manikarnika and other supporting roles (2019–present) ===
Ayyub's first release of 2019 was the biographical war drama Manikarnika: The Queen of Jhansi, based on the life of freedom fighter Rani Lakshmi Bai, portrayed by Kangana Ranaut in the film. His role was originally portrayed by Sonu Sood, who left the film because of some disagreements with the film's makers as the director Krish got replaced, and was subsequently replaced by Ayyub. The film was released generally to positive response, but was a modest commercial success at the box office earning more than ₹1.32 billion (US$14 million).

Later that year, Ayyub co-starred with Ayushmann Khurrana in Anubhav Sinha's crime thriller Article 15. Highlighting caste discrimination in India, it was inspired by multiple events, including the 2014 Badaun gang rape allegations and the 2016 Una flogging incident. Commercially, the film earned over ₹850 million (US$8.8 million) and proved an economic success. He next starred alongside Diljit Dosanjh and Kriti Sanon on Rohit Jugraj Chauhan's spoof comedy Arjun Patiala, a major commercial disaster. This changed later that year when Ayyub played Rishi Aggarwal, an army officer whose devoted wife (essayed by Taapsee Pannu) becomes a nurse for him, in Jagan Shakti's directorial debut Mission Mangal—a science fiction film about the scientists who contributed to the Mars Orbiter Mission held in 2013. With domestic earnings of over ₹1.98 billion (US$21 million), it emerged as a huge success and one of his most commercially successful features.

In 2020, he was one of the two male lead in Hansal Mehta's directed film Chhalaang.

In 2021, Ayyub is appearing in the web series Tandav, directed by Ali Abbas Zafar streaming on Amazon Prime Video. He is scheduled to appear in Atrangi Re alongside Akshay Kumar, Dhanush and Sara Ali Khan, which is releasing in August.

== Filmography ==
=== Films ===
Key
†	Denotes films that have not yet been released

Year	Title	Role	Notes
2011	No One Killed Jessica	Manu Sharma / Manish	Nominated—Filmfare Award for Best Male Debut
2011	Tanu Weds Manu	Baarik Karnak / Baaru	
2011	Mere Brother Ki Dulhan	Shobhit	
2012	Jannat 2	Balli	
2013	Raanjhanaa	Murari Gupta	
2013	Shahid	Arif Azmi	
2013	Maazii	Ashfaque	
2014	Raja Natwarlal	Jojo	
2015	Dolly Ki Doli	Raju Dubey	
2015	Tanu Weds Manu: Returns	Arun Kumar Singh / Chintu	
2015	Phantom	Samit Mishra	
2015	All Is Well	Chima	
2017	Raees	Sadiq Ibrahim	
2017	Tubelight	Narayan	
2017	Sameer	Sameer Sengupta	
2018	Thugs of Hindostan	Shanichar	
2018	Zero	Guddu	
2019	Manikarnika: The Queen of Jhansi	Sadashiv	
2019	Article 15	Nishad	
2019	Arjun Patiala	Sakool	
2019	Mission Mangal	Rishi Aggarwal	
2019	377 Ab Normal	Arif Zafar	
2020	Chhalaang	Inder Mohan Singh	
2022	Jogi	Rawinder Chautala	
2023	Haddi	Irfan	
2023	Sam Bahadur	Yahya Khan	
2023	Joram	Ratnakar	
2025	Kaalidhar Laapata	Subodh	
2025	DNA	Varadarajan	Tamil film
2025	Nishaanchi	Kamla Ajib	
2025	Nishaanchi Part 2	Kamla Ajib	
2025	Tere Ishk Mein	Pandit	
2026	Assi	Vinay	
2026	Our Share of Sand	Rohan Mirani	

=== Television ===
Year	Title	Role	Notes
2019	Rangbaaz	IPS Sanjay Singh Meena	
2020	A Simple Murder	Manish	
2021	Tandav	Shiva Shekhar	
2022	Bloody Brothers	Daljit Grover	
2023	Scoop	Imran Siddiqui/Hussain Zaidi	
2025	Kanneda	Rawat	
2025	Criminal Justice: A Family Matter	Raj Nagpal	
2025	Real Kashmir Football Club	Sohail Mir	
2026	Sankalp	Aditya Verma	
2026	Hunkkaar	Babban Rao Bhalerao	
