= Andrea Kevichüsa =

Indian model and actress

- Kevichüsa at the Vogue Forces of Fashion, November 2023
- Born: Carol Andrea Kevichüsa; 18 February 2001 (age 25); Kohima, Nagaland, India
- Education: Little Flower School
- Occupations: Model; Actress
- Years active: 2016–present
- Relatives: Kevichüsa family
- Modelling information
- Height: 5 ft 9 in (1.75 m)
- Hair colour: Black
- Eye colour: Dark brown
- Agency: Anima Creatives; Titanium Management; One Management (New York)

Carol Andrea Kevichüsa (/ˈkɛvitʃsə/; born 18 February 2001) is an Indian model and actress. She made her acting debut with Anek in 2022 alongside Ayushmann Khurrana, for which she won the Filmfare Award for Best Female Debut. She also appeared in season 3 of The Family Man.

== Early life ==
Carol Andrea Kevichüsa was born on 18 February 2001 in Kohima, Nagaland. Her father is an Angami Naga, and Mizo ancestry. Her mother is of Ao Naga descent. She is the youngest of five sisters. Kevichüsa attended Little Flower Higher Secondary School in Kohima.

== Career ==
Kevichüsa started modelling in 2016 at age of 15 after she was scouted by a modelling agency.

Kevichüsa has worked with fashion designers like Sabyasachi Mukherjee and several other notable brands. She has also worked for Katrina Kaif’s cosmetic line, Kay Beauty and has been featured in editorials of magazines such as Vogue India, Elle, Femina, and on the covers of Filmfare, Grazia, Lucire, and Harper's Bazaar.

In 2022, Kevichüsa made her film debut with Anek. The film is written and directed by Anubhav Sinha. Kevichüsa plays the role of a North East Indian boxer. Kevichüsa won the 2023 Filmfare Award for Best Female Debut for her role in the film.

In 2025, she featured in the Prime Video show The Family Man, playing the role of Nima.

== Personal life ==
Kevichüsa is in a relationship with filmmaker Theja Rio.

== Filmography ==
=== Films ===
Year	Title	Role	Notes	Ref.
2022	Anek	Aido	Film debut	

=== Television ===
Year	Title	Role	Notes	Ref.
2025	The Family Man	Nima	Season 3	

== Awards and nominations ==
Year	Award	Category	Work	Result	Ref.
2023	68th Filmfare Awards	Best Female Debut	Anek	Won	

=== Other awards ===
Year	Award	Ref.
2023	TaFMA Excellence Award	
