= Assi (film) =

2026 Hindi-language film by Anubhav Sinha

- Theatrical release poster
- Directed by: Anubhav Sinha
- Written by: Gaurav Solanki; Anubhav Sinha
- Produced by: Bhushan Kumar; Krishan Kumar; Anubhav Sinha
- Starring: Taapsee Pannu; Kani Kusruti; Revathy; Manoj Pahwa; Kumud Mishra; Mohammed Zeeshan Ayyub
- Cinematography: Ewan Mulligan
- Edited by: Amarjit Singh
- Music by: Ranjit Barot
- Production companies: Benaras Media Works; T-Series Films
- Distributed by: Panorama Studios
- Release date: 20 February 2026
- Running time: 133 minutes
- Country: India
- Language: Hindi
- Budget: ₹30 crore
- Box office: est. ₹13.43 crore

Assi (transl. Eighty) is a 2026 Indian Hindi-language legal drama film directed by Anubhav Sinha and produced by Bhushan Kumar, Krishan Kumar and Sinha under the banners of Benaras Mediaworks and T-Series Films. It stars Taapsee Pannu in the lead role.

The film was released in theatres on 20 February 2026, to positive reviews from critics but emerged as a commercial failure.

== Plot ==
Parima is a Malayali school teacher living in Delhi with her husband Vinay and their young son, leading a modest but content middle‑class life. One night while returning home from a staff gathering, she is abducted near a metro station by five young men in a car, who brutally gang‑rape her for hours, film parts of the assault, and then dump her on a railway track, assuming she will die. Severely injured, half‑clothed, and bleeding, Parima is discovered by a passerby and rushed to the hospital, where she survives but is left with deep physical and psychological trauma. Her assault quickly becomes a national news story, framed as yet another horrific Delhi rape case, and the film repeatedly reminds viewers that the title “Assi” refers to the statistic of roughly 80 reported rapes a day in India.

The police launch an investigation, rounding up the five accused, but from the beginning the system feels indifferent and corrupt, with hints of bribery, tampered evidence, and half‑hearted paperwork. Vinay struggles between caring for his wife and protecting their son from the media circus and social stigma, while his friend and colleague Kartik grows increasingly disillusioned and angry at how the case is being handled. Around them, Parima’s school distances itself to avoid controversy, neighbours gossip and blame, and some of her own acquaintances falter in their support, illustrating how victims are socially isolated even as their stories are consumed by the public.

Raavi, a fiery, idealistic criminal lawyer decides to represent Parima and make the case a test of the justice system itself. Much of the film plays out as intense courtroom drama, with Raavi facing a smug and ruthless defence lawyer who uses victim‑blaming tactics: he probes Parima’s character, her clothing, her movements that night, and every inconsistency in her testimony to suggest she is unreliable or complicit. A stern female judge presides, often watching in silence as the trial exposes misogyny embedded in legal procedure, media narratives, and public opinion. Outside court, a corrupt investigating officer wrestles with guilt as he participates in or tolerates the manipulation of crucial forensic evidence and witness intimidation, showing how even “good” individuals get pulled into a rotten system.

As the case drags on, key DNA evidence is compromised, witnesses retract or contradict earlier statements, and the investigation appears to be falling apart, making it look increasingly likely that the accused will walk free. During this middle stretch, the film also tracks a growing undercurrent of public rage: we see protests, social media storms, and ominous shots of ordinary people moving through rain‑soaked streets carrying black umbrellas. These scattered images gradually coalesce into the urban legend of the “Umbrella Man,” a mysterious vigilante or network rumoured to target sexual predators when the courts fail, turning anonymous citizens with umbrellas into a symbol of extra‑legal, crowd‑sourced justice.

The climax hinges on both the verdict and how this vigilante myth plays out. In the official courtroom narrative, after months of gruelling cross‑examination and emotional breakdowns, Raavi manages to rebuild the case using survivor‑focused testimony, corroborating circumstantial evidence, and exposing contradictions in the defendants’ accounts. Against the backdrop of public pressure and her own moral conviction, the judge finally delivers a verdict in Parima’s favour, finding the five men guilty and sentencing them, formally acknowledging the crime and granting Parima legal justice. However, the film frames this legal victory as heavy and sombre rather than triumphant, emphasising that no verdict can reverse the harm or fix the systemic failures that made the case so precarious.

In the parallel “Umbrella Man” thread, the film strongly suggests that while the court has spoken, a shadow form of community justice has also taken root, with hints that other unpunished offenders are being tracked and punished off‑screen by this diffuse, umbrella‑carrying collective. The closing sequences show Parima gaining some emotional closure, but she and the audience are left acutely aware that her case is just one among many, and that the apparent victory emerges from a system that nearly failed her at every step. The final tone is deliberately unsettling: justice arrives, but it feels fragile, conditional, and reliant on both public outrage and the threat of vigilante action, underlining the film’s bleak view of institutional accountability.

== Cast ==
- Taapsee Pannu as Advocate Raavi Huskar
- Kani Kusruti as Parima
- Revathy as Justice Vasudha
- Manoj Pahwa as Deepraj Saini
- Kumud Mishra as Kartik
- Mohammed Zeeshan Ayyub as Vinay
- Satyajit Sharma as Advocate Prakash Jaiswal
- Advik Jaiswal as Dhruv
- Vipul Guptta as Ballu
- Jatin Goswami as Inspector Sanjay Chautala
- Sahil Sethi as Sameer
- Abhishek Kaushal as Bunty
- Tejender Singh as Ghool
- Abhishant Rana as Nikka
- Sudhana Sankar as Meera
- Pahal Samyani as Shweta
- Tripti Thakur as Savita
- Akshara Padwal as Vidya
- Neelam Gehlot as Suman
- Gauri Dhawal as Megha
- Devendra Chauhan as Sandeep
- Anaya Goyal as Sana
- Divyansh Mohan as Charlie
- Akanksha Choudhary as Kaveri

Special appearances

- Seema Pahwa as School Principal
- Supriya Pathak as Deepraj’s wife
- Naseeruddin Shah as the Basu Sir

== Production ==
The film was developed by Anubhav Sinha under his banner Benaras Media Works in collaboration with T-Series Films. The screenplay was written by Sinha along with Gaurav Solanki. The project marked another collaboration between Sinha and Taapsee Pannu following their earlier films together. Principal photography took place in 2025. The film’s cinematography was handled by Ewan Mulligan, with editing by Amarjit Singh. The music and background score were composed by Ranjit Barot.

== Music ==
Assi

Soundtrack album by Ranjit Barot
- Released: 1 February 2026
- Recorded: 2025–2026
- Genre: Feature film soundtrack
- Label: T-Series
- Producer: Ranjit Barot

The songs featured in the film are composed by Ranjit Barot. The film score is also composed by Barot. The first single from the film, titled "Mann Hawa", was released ahead of the theatrical launch.

Track listing
No.	Title	Lyrics	Music	Singer(s)	Length
1.	"Mann Hawa"	Kumaar	Rochak Kohli	Mohit Chauhan, Parampara Tandon, Rochak Kohli	5:30
2.	"Maai Teri Yaad"	Swanand Kirkire	Swanand Kirkire	Swanand Kirkire	4:13
Total length:					9:43

== Release ==
A special premiere screening was held at Cinepolis Acropolis Mall, Kolkata, on 17 February 2026, ahead of the film's theatrical release. The film was released in theatres on 20 February 2026.

=== Home media ===
After its theatrical run, it is expected to be made available for streaming in ZEE5 on 17 April 2026.

== Reception ==
Assi received positive reviews from critics. On the review aggregator website Rotten Tomatoes, 90% of 10 critics' reviews are positive, with an average rating of 6.7/10.

Rahul Desai of The Hollywood Reporter India commented that "Anubhav Sinha attempts to recreate the urgency of 'Mulk,' but something is amiss this time, and When heavy-handed intent consumes storytelling" Shubhra Gupta of The Indian Express gave 3 stars out of 5 and writes that "Taapsee Pannu film is totally and deliberately in your face, with the filmmakers clearly hoping that you will never be able to get it out of your mind and heart."

Nandini Ramnath of Scroll.in stated that "Harrowing, hard-hitting and high-minded – Assi proudly wears the triple-H crown of the conscience-pricking Bollywood social drama." Savera R Someshwar writing for Rediff.com rated it 3/5 strars and observed that "There are moments in Assi when you will get scared, when you will get angry, when you will feel helpless... when you will realise the enormity of the crime."

A critic of Bollywood Hungama gave 3.5 stars out of 5 and writes that "ASSI is a hard-hitting courtroom drama that unsettles and stays with you, powered by a gripping premise and solid performances, especially by Taapsee Pannu and Kani Kusruti." Rishabh Suri of Hindustan Times gave 3 stars out of 5 and writes that "This is not a comfortable film, nor does it aim to be. It wants to provoke, to keep the wound open just long enough for the viewer to sit with the discomfort. Assi may not always find the most nuanced way to make its point, but its heart is in the right place, and in today’s climate, that urgency still counts for something."

Anuj Kumar of The Hindu observed that "The good thing is, despite being deeply political, Assi’s subtext is not confined to any one side of the ideological discourse on the problem." Dhaval Roy of The Times of India gave 4 stars out of 5 and said that "Though hard-hitting, the narrative resists melodrama, making it more thought-provoking than sensational. It adopts a forward-looking stance through the children who appear during the proceedings, suggesting the need to sensitise the next generation."

Vineeta Kumar of India Today gave 3.5 stars out of 5 and writes that "Anubhav Sinha's Assi is not an easy watch, and it isn't meant to be. The film confronts sexual violence, patriarchy and the justice system without offering comfort." Devesh Sharma of Filmfare rated it 4/5 stars and stated that "Assi is, ultimately, a film about complicity, familial, institutional and societal. It acknowledges police overwork and corruption without caricature." Sarita A Tanwar writing for Variety India stated that "Anubhav Sinha’s ‘Assi’ manages to unsettle you to the core. The impact of the film lingers on your mind long after you’ve left the cinema hall."
