= Sameer (film) =

Sameer Tailor (2017 film)
- Theatrical release poster
- Directed by: Dakxin Bajrange Chhara
- Written by: Karan Vyas
- Produced by: Bankim Tamychi; Viren Ghamande; Manish Patel; Dakxin Bajrange Chhara
- Starring: Mohammed Zeeshan Ayyub; Subrat Dutta; Anjali Patil; Chinmay Mandlekar; Seema Biswas
- Cinematography: Gargey Trivedi
- Edited by: Aashish Mayur Shah
- Music by: Pankaj Awasthy
- Production company: Nomad Movies Pvt Ltd
- Distributed by: Platoon One Films
- Release dates: 6 May 2017 (17th New York Indian Film Festival); 8 September 2017 (India)
- Running time: 131 minutes
- Country: India
- Language: Hindi

Sameer is the 2017 Indian Hindi-language drama film directed by Dakxin Chhara in his directorial debut. The film premiered at the New York Indian Film Festival in 2017. The film stars Mohammed Zeeshan Ayyub, Subrat Dutta, Anjali Patil, and Seema Biswas. Sameer was released in India on 8 September 2017.

== Premise ==
After a series of bomb blasts in Hyderabad a special ATS team, led by officer Desai, identified Yasin Darji as the suspect. Following a tip, the team reaches a location to arrest Yasin only to end up arresting Sameer, the wrong guy. While the error needs to be fixed, the higher authorities decide to bargain with Sameer for his freedom, sending him as a mole. Sameer turns a mole to stop Yasin Darji before he kills more innocent people. A chase begins. Will they manage to stop Yasin, or will Yasin triumph?

== Cast ==
- Mohammed Zeeshan Ayyub as Sameer Sengupta
- Subrat Dutta as Desai, ATS Dy. Chief
- Anjali Patil as Alia Irade
- Chinmay Mandlekar as Shaheed
- Seema Biswas as Mumtaz Khala
- Manoj Shah as Bahubali Mehta
- Alok Gagdekar as Manto
- Master Shubham Bajrange as Rocket

== Film Festivals and Awards ==
Sameer premiered at the 17th New York Indian Film Festival on 6 May 2017. The film was also screened at the Charlotte Asian Film Festival 2017.

== Controversy ==
Sameer made into the headlines when India's Central Board of Film Certification ordered the director to remove the words "Mann ki baat", from a dialogue as it is the name of the radio show hosted by Prime Minister Narendra Modi.

== Soundtrack ==
Sameer

Soundtrack album by Pankaj Awasthi & Vipin Heero
- Released: 1 September 2017
- Genre: Feature film soundtrack
- Length: 12:48
- Label: Times Music

The soundtrack of Sameer consists of 3 songs composed by Vipin Heero and Pankaj Awasthi while the lyrics have been written by Piyush Mishra and Vipin Heero.

Tracklist
No.	Title	Lyrics	Music	Singer(s)	Length
1.	"Jaa Chhipkali Ja"	Vipin Heero	Vipin Heero	Vipin Heero	04:35
2.	"Yaad Hai Yaa Bhulte"	Piyush Mishra	Pankaj Awasthi	Aaman Trikha	03:41
3.	"Ye Jo, Jo Bhi Mar Gaya"	Piyush Mishra	Pankaj Awasthi	Pankaj Awasthi & Swanand Kirkire	04:33
Total length:					12:48

== Reception ==
Sweta Kausal of Hindustan Times gave the film a rating of 3.5 out of 5 stars and praised the performance of Mohammed Zeeshan Ayyub saying that, "While all the actors seamlessly fit their characters, Zeeshan once again proves his mettle as he goes from a vulnerable man to a becoming a puppet and later a master negotiator.". About the film the critic said that, "It is the well-knit screenplay and crisp editing that maintains the pace and makes Sameer an edge-of-the-seat thriller with a few melodramatic dialogues thrown in." Reza Noorani of The Times of India gave the film a rating of 3 out of 5 stars and said that, "Sameer is a proper edge-of-the-seat thriller, albeit with its flaws, but keeps you hooked till the very end with a very strong pay-off." Shubhra Gupta of The Indian Express praised the performance of Mohammed Zeeshan Ayyub but also added that, "the rest of it is thin and predictable" and gave the film a rating of 1.5 out of 5 stars. Business Standard gave the film a rating of 3 out of 5 and said that, "For all its glaring sins of excesses and hysteria "Sameer" dares to go into a political theme that spells trouble for the perpetrator. For this, the film needs to be commended." Vishal Verma of Glamsham gave the film a rating of 3 out of 5 and said that, "Despite having its flaws and its overwhelming reluctance to take any sides, SAMEER still manages to be a tight, edge of the seat surprise in the end and that's the movie's biggest victory."
