= Kumud Mishra =

Indian actor

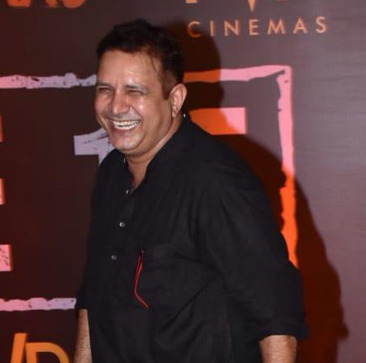
- Occupations: Actor, film director
- Years active: 1994–present
- Spouse: Ayesha Raza Mishra (m. 2008)
- Children: 1

Kumud Mishra is an Indian actor who works in Hindi cinema. He is known for playing supporting and antagonist roles.

== Career ==
He played Eknath, a trade union leader in the 1995 Doordarshan drama Swabhimaan. In 2011, he progressed to film acting with Rishi Kapoor and Ranbir Kapoor's films Patiala House and Rockstar.

Mishra has played supporting roles in the films Sardari Begum, Filmistaan, Revolver Rani, Jolly LLB 2, Raanjhanaa, Badlapur, Bangistan, Airlift, M. S. Dhoni: The Untold Story, Sultan, Tiger Zinda Hai, Rukh, Aiyaary, Mulk, De De Pyaar De, Article 15, Bharat, Jawaani Jaaneman, Thappad, Sooryavanshi and Tadap. In 2020, he starred in the title role in Sony LIV original Ram Singh Charlie that follows the life of a circus artist and his subsequent struggle after the circus is shut. Mishra is an alumnus of Rashtriya Military School Belgaum, Karnataka and graduated from National School Of Drama, Delhi. In 2026, he made his Gujarati cinema debut with the drama film Dhabkaaro directed by Abhishek Shah

== Personal life ==
Mishra is married to actress Ayesha Raza and they have a son.

== Filmography ==
=== Films ===
Year	Title	Role	Notes
1996	Sardari Begum	Amode Bajaj	
2007	1971	Captain Kabir Mathur	
2010	That Girl in Yellow Boots	Lynn	
2011	Patiala House	Young Gurtej Singh Kahlon	
2011	Rockstar	Khatana	
2012	Filmistaan	Mehmood Khan	
2012	Hansa	Bajju	
2013	Raanjhanaa	Inzamaan Qalib-E-Haider/Guruji	
2014	Revolver Rani	Ashish Tomar	
2014	Lekar Hum Deewana Dil	Pradeep Nigam	
2015	Badlapur	Inspector Govind	
2015	Bangistan	Abba Guru	
2016	Airlift	Sanjeev Kohli	
2016	Sultan	Barkat Hussain	
2016	Rustom	Erich Billimoria	
2016	M.S. Dhoni: The Untold Story	Mr. Deval Sahay	
2016	Rock On 2	Pandit Vibhuti Sharma	
2017	Jolly LLB 2	Inspector Suryaveer Singh	
2017	Rukh	Robin Kanwar	
2017	Firangi	King Indraveer Singh	
2017	Tiger Zinda Hai	Rakesh	
2018	Aiyaary	Gurinder Singh	
2018	High Jack	Mr. Tapas Taneja	
2018	Mulk	Judge Harish Madhok	
2019	De De Pyaar De	Atul Saxena	
2019	Nakkash	Vedanti	
2019	Bharat	Keemat Rai Kapoor	
2019	Article 15	Sub Inspector Jatav	
2019	One Day: Justice Delivered	Inspector Sharma	
2019	P Se Pyaar F Se Faraar	Omveer Singh	
2019	377 Ab Normal	Narendra Kaushal	
2020	Jawaani Jaaneman	Dimpy Singh	
2020	Thappad	Sachin Sandhu	
2020	Ram Singh Charlie	Ram Singh	Sony LIV film
2021	Sardar Ka Grandson	Pakistani officials Saqlain Niazi	Netflix film
2021	Sooryavanshi	Bilal Ahmed	
2021	Tadap	Ramisa's father	
2022	Anek	Abrar's boss	
2022	Jogi	Tejpal Arora	Netflix film
2022	Nazar Andaaz	Sudhir	
2022	Saroj Ka Rishta		
2023	Kuttey	Vishwapal Suri	
2023	Mission Majnu	Raman Singh/Maulvi Saheb	Netflix film
2023	Lust Stories 2	Maharaj Suraj Bhanumal Singh	Netflix Anthology film
2023	The Great Indian Family	Pandit Siya Ram Tripathi	
2023	Mission Raniganj	RJ Ujjwal	
2023	Tiger 3	Rakesh Prasad	
2024	Amar Singh Chamkila	Ahmed	
2024	Mr. & Mrs. Mahi	Hardayal Aggarwal	
2024	Vedaa	Mausaji	
2025	The Diplomat	N. M. Syed	
2025	Nishaanchi	Ambika Prasad	
2025	Nishaanchi Part 2	Ambika Prasad	
2025	Mannu Kya Karegga	Father	
2026	Vadh 2	Jailer Prakash Singh	
2026	Assi	Kartik	
2026	Krishnavataram Part 1: The Heart (Hridayam)	Kamsa, Krishna's evil uncle	
2026	Main Vaapas Aaunga	BSF Chief	
2026	Dhabkaaro	Gaffar Chavda	Gujarati cinema debut

=== Web series ===
Year	Title	Role	Platform	Ref.
2016 - 2022	TVF Tripling	Chinmay Sharma	(S1 The Viral Fever) (S2 Sony LIV) (S3 Zee5)	
2021	Tandav	Gopal Das Munshi	Amazon Prime Video	
2022	Dr. Arora	Dr. Vishesh Arora	Sony LIV	
2024	IC 814: The Kandahar Hijack	Ranjan Mishra	Netflix	
2026	Hathras	Senior administrative official		
2026	Satrangi: Badle Ka Khel	Sona Singh		
2026	Waiting Hai	Pramukh Tripathi	Amazon MX Player	

=== Short films ===
Year	Title	Role	Director	Ref.
1999	Last Train to Mahakali	Friend of Kay Kay Menon	Anurag Kashyap	
2019	Laddoo	Maulavi of mosque	Sameer Sadhwani; Kishor Sadhwani	
2020	Pandit Usman	Pandit Chintu ji	Akram Hassan	
2021	Itvar	Anubhav Verma	Rahul Srivastva	

== Accolades ==
Year	Category	Nominated work	Result	Ref.
International Indian Film Academy Awards
2021	Best Supporting Actor	Article 15	Nominated	
2022	Best Supporting Actor	Thappad	Nominated	
Filmfare Awards
2021	Best Supporting Actor	Thappad	Nominated	
FOI Online Awards
2020	Best Actor in a Supporting Role	Article 15	Nominated	
2021	Best Actor in a Supporting Role	Thappad	Nominated	
2021	Best Actor in a Leading Role	Ram Singh Charlie	Nominated	
