= P Se Pyaar F Se Faraar =

2019 Indian Hindi-language black comedy drama film by Manoj Tiwari

- Theatrical release poster
- Directed by: Manoj Tiwari
- Written by: Vishal Vijay Kumar
- Story by: Manoj Tiwari
- Produced by: Jogender Singh
- Starring: Bhavesh Kumar; Jimmy Sheirgill; Kumud Mishra; Sanjay Mishra; Girish Kulkarni; Zakir Hussain; Akhilendra Mishra
- Cinematography: D. Kannan; Devendra Tiwari
- Edited by: Chandan Arora
- Music by: Ripul Sharma; Sanjiv – Ajay; Score: Dharma Vish
- Production company: OK Movies
- Distributed by: PVR Pictures
- Release date: 18 October 2019
- Running time: 2hrs 11 min
- Country: India
- Language: Hindi

P Se Pyaar F Se Faraar (transl. L for Love, A for Absconding) is a 2019 Indian Hindi-language drama film directed by Manoj Tiwari and produced by Jogender Singh under the banner Ok Movies. It features Bhavesh Kumar, who marks his debut in the film, and stars Jimmy Sheirgill, Sanjay Mishra, Girish Kulkarni, Zakir Hussain, Akhilendra Mishra and Kumud Mishra. The story is based upon Article 15 of the Constitution of India, which prohibits discrimination on grounds of religion, race, caste, sex or place of birth, and Article 19, which deals with freedom of thought and expression.

The first look of the film was released on 28 Aug 2019 as a motion poster by OK Movies. The film was released on 18 October 2019.

== Cast ==
Source -

- Bhavesh Kumar as Sooraj Mali
- Jimmy Sheirgill as Rajveer Singh
- Kumud Mishra as Omveer Singh
- Sanjay Mishra as Mr. Inquiry
- Girish Kulkarni as Rajesh
- Zakir Hussain as Coach Saheb
- Akhilendra Mishra as Benia
- Smita Singh as Omveers wife
- Brijendra Kala as Police Constable
- Pankaj Jha as Pankaj Singh
- Neha Joshi as Mallika
- Asif Basra as Sompal Singh
- Seema Azmi as Gouri Malan
- Anuja Jha as Meena
- Shivani Sapori as Amma Ji
- Ehsan Khan as Sandeep
- Jacynthe Cauvier as Foreign Musician
- Bhavesh Kumar as Sonu
- Jyoti Yadav as Jhanvi

== Marketing and release ==
The first look of the film in a motion poster was unveiled by OK Movies & Music on 28 August 2019.

The film was released on 18 October 2019 worldwide, through PVR Pictures.

== Soundtrack ==
P Se Pyaar F Se Faraar

Soundtrack album by Ripul Sharma
- Released: 11 October 2019
- Recorded: 2019
- Genre: Feature film soundtrack
- Length: 41:34
- Language: Hindi
- Label: Zee Music Company
External audio
- Official Audio Jukebox on YouTube

The music of the film is composed by Ripul Sharma. Song "Ishq Kalandar" is composed by Sanjeev - Ajay and lyrics by Sanjeev Chaturvedi. Other lyrics are written by Ripul Sharma, Vipul Ghangale, Milind Gadhavi and Buddha Mukherjee.

Track listing
No.	Title	Lyrics	Singer(s)	Length
1.	"Ishq Teri Zaat Hai Kya"	Ripul Sharma	Ripul Sharma	4:59
2.	"Teri Hona Chahu Mein"	Ripul Sharma	Momita Das Sharma, Keval Walanj	4:18
3.	"Parindey"	Ripul Sharma	Rituraj Mohanty	4:28
4.	"Krishna Teri Nagari"	Ripul Sharma	Pandit Roshanlal Verma	2:15
5.	"Ishq Kalandar"	Sanjeev Chaturvedi	Rani Indrani Sharma, Rahul Jain	4:02
6.	"Ishq Teri Jaat Hai Kya" (Version 2)	Ripul Sharma	Ripul Sharma	3:37
7.	"Parindey (Marathi)"	Vipul Ghangale	Datta Mestri	4:28
8.	"Parindey (Punjabi)"	Ripul Sharma	Nitin Gupta	4:28
9.	"Parindey (Gujarati)"	Milind Gadhavi	Jaydev Gosai	4:28
10.	"Parindey (Bengali)"	Buddha Mukherjee	Buddha Mukherjee	4:31
Total length:				41:34
