= Sandali Sinha =

Indian Bollywood actress and model (born 1973)

Sandali Sinha Salaskar
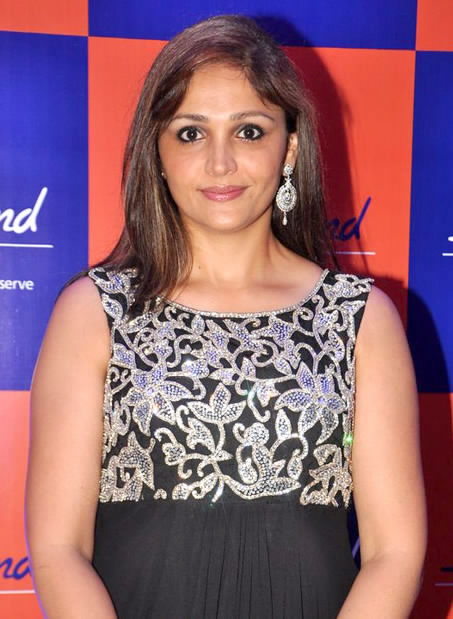
- Sinha in 2012
- Born: 11 January 1973 (age 53); Nagpur, Maharashtra , India
- Years active: 1999–2005, 2016
- Known for: Tum Bin (2001)
- Spouse: Kiran Salaskar (m. 2005)
- Children: 2

Sandali Sinha (born 11 January 1973) is a former Indian Bollywood actress and model. She is known for her portrayal of Pia in the romantic film Tum Bin (2001).

== Early life ==
Her father, an officer, died while on duty. Her mother raised three children, including Sandali, in Delhi. She did her schooling from Air Force Bal Bharati School and graduated from Jesus and Mary College, Delhi. Sinha went to Kishore Namit Kapoor Acting Institute. Born in a family of pilots and doctors, Sinha was keen on becoming a doctor. But a brief experience on an amateur fashion show made her shift to the world of modelling.

== Career ==
A graduate in commerce, Sinha relocated to Mumbai for better prospects. In a short period, Sinha became a model. Fame first came to her with a Sonu Nigam music video called "Deewana", which was directed by Anubhav Sinha. This music video took Sinha to her debut film Tum Bin, directed by Anubhav Sinha and produced by Super Cassettes Industries Limited. In the film, Sinha plays Pia, an innocent woman who becomes a victim of circumstances.

== Personal life ==
Sinha married Kiran Salaskar, a businessman, in November 2005 and they have two children.

== Filmography ==
=== Television ===
Year	Show	Role
1999	Muskaan	Mahek
1999	Tanha	

=== Films ===
Year	Film	Role
2001	Tum Bin	Pia
2003	Pinjar	Laajo
2003	Om	Sandali Dhariwal
2004	Ab Tumhare Hawale Watan Saathiyo	Dr. Sakshi
2005	Nigehbaan: The Third Eye	Nisha
2005	Orey Pandu	Priya (Telugu)
2007	Main Rony Aur Jony	Nina
2016	Tum Bin II	Pia (special appearance)

== See also ==
- List of people from Bihar
