= Smita Singh =

Indian actress (born 1980)

- Born: 16 December 1980 (age 45); Lucknow, Uttar Pradesh, India
- Occupation: Actress
- Years active: 2001–present

Smita Singh (born 16 December 1980) is an Indian actress who appeared in the television show Bhagyavidhaata and is known for her portrayal of the leading vamp character Punpunwali. She has also acted in the TV serial Kkusum and in Zee TV's Hitler Didi, for which she was nominated for Best Actor in a Comedy Role by the Indian Telly Awards. In 2016, she played the negative role of Kosi Devi in Colors TV's popular show Thapki Pyar Ki.

== Personal life ==
Smita Singh was born on 16 December 1980, in Lucknow, to Dr Pratap Singh, an anesthetist, and Veena Singh, a homemaker. She has a younger sister, Smriti Singh. She went to Cathedral school Lucknow, then I.T. College Lucknow and did her graduation from Lucknow University. From a very young age, she started working in plays and worked for television as a child actor in Lucknow. In 2001, she moved to Mumbai.

== Television ==
Year	Show	Role	Channel
2001	Kahaani Ghar Ghar Kii	Cameo Role	Star Plus
2001–2002	Kkusum	Sonali Deshmukh	Sony TV
2001–2002	Kohi Apna Sa	Urvashi Gill	Zee TV
2004–2006	Remix	Kuki	Star One
2004–2006	Instant Khichdi	Saadhvi Sandhya Devi	Star One
2006–2008	Woh Rehne Waali Mehlon Ki	Chameli	Sahara One
2009–2011	Bhagyavidhaata	"Pun Pun Wali" Shobha Sinha	Colors TV
2010	Baba Aiso Varr Dhoondo	Cameo	NDTV Imagine
2011	Looteri Dulhan	Dehli Singh	NDTV Imagine
2011–2013	Hitler Didi	Sunaina Sharma / Guru Maa	Zee TV
2015	Rishton Ka Mela	Kamla	Zee TV
2015	Shastri Sisters	Guggal Pandey	Colors TV
2016	Dr. Bhanumati On Duty		SAB TV
2016–2017	Thapki Pyaar Ki	Kosi Devi / Kalavti Devi	Colors TV
2018–2019	Karn Sangini	Gauri	Star Plus
2019–2020	Tera Kya Hoga Alia	Durga Parihaar	SAB TV
2022	Sab Satrangi	Mandy	SAB TV
2023	Main Hoon Aparajita	Kalpana Singh	Zee TV

=== Films ===
Year	Title	Role	Notes
2013	My Friend Ganesha 4	Smita	
2019	P Se Pyaar F Se Faraar	Omveers wife	
2021	Cash	Alka Shrivastava	

=== Reality shows ===
Year	Title	Role	TV Channel
2010	Comedy Circus	Participant	Sony TV
2010-2011	Kitchen Champion	season 1 Participant, Season 2 Host (for one episode), Season 4 Host (Full season)	Colors
2010	Big Money	Participant (Vamp Special)	Imagine TV
