= Tandav (TV series) =

Indian television series

- Promotional poster
- Genre: Thriller; Action; Political drama
- Created by: Ali Abbas Zafar
- Story by: Gaurav Solanki
- Directed by: Ali Abbas Zafar
- Starring: See Cast section
- Music by: Songs: A. R. Rahman; Score: Julius Packiam
- Country of origin: India
- Original language: Hindi
- No. of seasons: 1
- No. of episodes: 9

Production
- Cinematography: Karol Stadnik
- Editor: Steven H. Bernard
- Running time: 26-38 minutes
- Production company: Offside Entertainment

Original release
- Network: Amazon Prime Video
- Release: 15 January 2021

Tandav is an Indian political thriller television series on Amazon Prime Video, created, directed and produced by Ali Abbas Zafar, in his digital debut, with the script being written by Gaurav Solanki. The series has an ensemble cast featuring Saif Ali Khan, Sunil Grover, Tigmanshu Dhulia, Dimple Kapadia, Mohammed Zeeshan Ayyub, Dino Morea and Anup Soni. The series is about the dark corners of Indian politics, where people who will go to any lengths in pursuit of power.

Principal shoot of Tandav began in October 2019, with filming mostly took place across the Pataudi Palace in Haryana, and Delhi. The series has cinematography handled by Karol Stadnik and edited by Steven H. Bernard; the background score is composed by Julius Packiam. The series premiered through the streaming platform Amazon Prime Video on 15 January 2021.

== Premise ==
Saif Ali Khan plays Samar Pratap Singh, the charismatic leader of the Janata Lok Dal (JLD), one of India's leading political parties. He believes that he is ready to become Prime Minister. However, his father, the party patriarch and current Prime Minister Devki Nandan Singh (played by Tigmanshu Dhulia), is not ready to retire. Other leaders who consider themselves worthy of this position include Anuradha Kishore (Dimple Kapadia), a close associate of Devki's, and senior party leader Gopal Das (Kumud Mishra). The position is not easily won, though; they must constantly strive for it. Meanwhile, idealistic campus activist Shiva Shekhar (played by Mohammed Zeeshan Ayyub) becomes an overnight icon after impressing at a political event. Shiva now wants to bring about change, sway the youth and overthrow those in power — he has tasted the sweetness of power. But power corrupts. The paths of Shiva and Samar will cross as country and youth politics collide in Tandav. Tandav is a tale of manipulation that exposes the layers of human greed, ambition, love, vulnerability, and violence.

== Cast ==
- Saif Ali Khan as Samar Pratap Singh, the son of a three-term Prime Minister, Devki Nandan Singh
- Dimple Kapadia as Anuradha Kishore, an old friend of Devki Nandan Singh
- Sunil Grover as Gurpal Singh
- Mohammed Zeeshan Ayyub as Shiva Shekhar, student in VNU
- Anup Soni as Kailash Kumar
- Kritika Kamra as Sana Mir, student in VNU
- Sarah Jane Dias as Ayesha Pratap Singh, wife of Samar Pratap Singh
- Gauahar Khan as Maithili Sharan, Anuradha's Personal Assistant
- Dino Morea as Professor Jigar Sampath
- Sandhya Mridul as Professor Sandhya Nigam
- Tigmanshu Dhulia as Devki Nandan Singh, father of Samar Pratap Singh and Raghu Kishore Singh
- Priyal Mahajan as Rhea Pratap Singh, daughter of Samar Pratap Singh and Ayesha Pratap Singh
- Neha Hinge as Garima Deswal
- Parv Kaila as Vishal Awasthi
- Kumud Mishra as Gopal Das Munshi
- Paresh Pahuja as Raghu Kishore Singh, son of Anuradha Kishore
- Kritika Avasthi as Richa Avasthi
- Tasneem Khan as Disha Kapoor
- Shonali Nagrani as Aditi Mishra
- Amyra Dastur as Ada Mir
- Hiten Tejwani as Ajay Ahluwalia, Editor at NNN
- Sukhmani Sadana as Divya Ahluwalia, Doctor
- Jaimin Panchal as Protestor in VNU
- Manju Bahuguna as Farmer 2
- Bhavna Choudhary as Preeti Singh
- Sunny Prajapati as Election Volunteer
- AN Ashar Naz as Election Volunteer 2

== Episodes ==
No.	Title	Directed by	Written by	Original release date
1	"Tanashah"	Ali Abbas Zafar	Gaurav Solanki	15 January 2021
Shiva is a student in VNU, near Malakpur, where farmers are protesting against a factory and highway being built in farmland. Police start attacking and shooting the protestors, killing two people. Shiva's friend, Imran, who was also at the protest, is arrested at VNU. Shiva and his friends go to bail him out, but the police refuse, and call several officers to beat up Shiva and the other college students who came to the station. Meanwhile, Samar Pratap Singh (Saif Ali Khan), a rising star of Lok Janata Dal Party, is the son of the incumbent Prime Minister Devki Nandan Singh, who has been ruling on that post for the last 10 years. The story begins with Samar coming out on the terrace of his house waving towards his party workers, cheering him up and hailing for Samar, as everybody is expecting a win in the General Elections, whose results are about to be declared the very next day. It is obvious to everyone that Samar's father will again become the Prime Minister of India. Although Samar's father is doubtful of his son's intentions toward the nation, he agrees that Samar has a higher popularity among the general public than himself. Still, he believes that Samar has the characteristics of a dictator, which may have ill effects on the country's democratic setup. Devki plans on giving Raghu, the son of Anuradha, the Defense Minister position, but Samar wants to give the position to Aditi, a female Air Force pilot. At night, Samar gives Devki a glass of wine, laced with Aconite, killing him. As he dies, Devki calls Anuradha, but he is unable to reach her.
2	"Aazaadi"	Ali Abbas Zafar	Gaurav Solanki	15 January 2021
The police at the station threaten the VNU students with a report that the students beat up three Police officers for no reason. Shiva visits Imran, who is worried that the media will tie his name to a terrorist organization. Shiva creates a fake video of the Police's attack on the protestors, and the Malakpur protests start trending on social media. Samar and his wife clean up Devki's office to make it seem like he died of a heart attack. News of Devki's death spreads like wildfire. Samar prepares for the funeral, while also talking to other members of the JLD party for support. Gopal Das, who was Devki's right-hand man, asks for Samar to support him as the new Prime Minister. Samar says he'll think about it, but spreads a rumor through the news that Gopal Das has started campaigning for Prime Minister almost immediately after Devki's death, shaming him in the eyes of the public. To save his reputation, Gopal Das tells the media he has no plans to run for Prime Minister. At Devki's cremation, Anuradha tells Samar that he'll support her for becoming Prime Minister, because she knows he killed Devki with Aconite.
3	"Chandragupta"	Ali Abbas Zafar	Gaurav Solanki	15 January 2021
Maithili Sharan, Anuradha's secretary gets a call from an unknown number and the man blackmails her with crucial information. Gurpal Chauhan, Samar's right-hand man sends his social media cell guy, Sharat to the doctor's houses to spy on them. Professor Jigar Sampath and Professor Sandhya Nigam are on the verge of a divorce. Farmers from Malakpur arrive at VNU to support Shiva Shekhar's endeavour. Simultaneously, JLD party members have big decisions to make at the JLD office.
4	"Left se Right"	Ali Abbas Zafar	Gaurav Solanki	15 January 2021
Mahant Kunj Police Station inspector Narendra Jhakar takes over the VNU students case and assists them. Garima Deswal invites Shiva for a panel discussion at National News Network where he meets Aditi Mishra, another member of the JLD. Later, farmers from Malakpur arrive at VNU again to thank Shiva as the government puts a stay order on any work happening on their land. Nomination day at VNU, Students Association of India (SAI) members nominate their respective candidates.
5	"Jeevan aur Mrityu"	Ali Abbas Zafar	Gaurav Solanki	15 January 2021
Election campaigning goes on in VNU with all parties vying for votes. SAI members search for their missing friend in the university and later reach Mahant Kunj Police Station to file a complaint. Party portfolios are distributed among the various JLD members. Swearing in of all the ministers takes place, while on the other hand dramatic events follow with the SAI missing member.
6	"Babool ka Ped"	Ali Abbas Zafar	Gaurav Solanki	15 January 2021
A key member of SAI withdraws their nomination. An anonymous caller calls Garima to give her a crucial piece of information. Garima questions Ajay about the same. Samar arrives at VNU and gives a speech to support and stand alongside the students. A massive fight ensues between the students of VNU.
7	"Dhappa"	Ali Abbas Zafar	Gaurav Solanki	15 January 2021
Gurpal meets his informer Chhote Lal at Indian International Centre of Medical Science (IICMS) who gives him valuable information. Gurpal watches CCTV footage of IICMS and spots something major. Sana Mir and Shiva request Samar to have a proper CBI investigation of the case. Shiva reaches Samar's house to meet him, Maithili searches for the anonymous caller, but finds someone else instead.
8	"Tandav"	Ali Abbas Zafar	Gaurav Solanki	15 January 2021
Reporters line up outside Home Minister Kailash Kumar's house. Sandhya gives him important news. VNU students request the election officers to postpone the elections. Shiva gives a speech and makes a major announcement at the Vivekananda Statue. Sana receives threatening messages from an unknown person. The presidential debate between Amit Mewani and Shiva is held at VNU.
9	"Khel"	Ali Abbas Zafar	Gaurav Solanki	15 January 2021
Election day at VNU, we see all the students vote for their preferred presidential candidate. An SAI member gets admitted to the hospital where other members come to visit. Tragedy strikes Anuradha Kishore as all news channels report about her. Victory speech at VNU after which Sana and Shiva decide to meet. Press conference held by JLD to make an announcement.

== Production ==
=== Development ===
Vijay Subramaniam, head of content for Amazon Prime Video India, announced six Indian originals, at the Television Critics Association's press tour held in California in February 2019, which also included Ali Abbas Zafar's debut streaming series as well. It is touted to be a political drama film which explores "the dark corners of Indian politics, where powerful politicians, and those who aspire to be, sow chaos and manipulate others to control the country, ruthless pragmatism contrasts with the frustrations and aspirations of contemporary India and the ideals of the country's youth".

Zafar teamed up with Gaurav Solanki to write the script which took a year to complete. Zafar eventually sent a rough one-page draft to which he discussed with Amazon Prime Video before Solanki expanded it into a full-fledged series. He wrote three drafts for eight episodes.

In an interview with Indian Express, Gaurav Solanki stated "Tandav, which will be majorly shot in Delhi, is centred around the power corridors of Indian politics. Along with it, there is also a story about an institute, which is on the lines of JNU (Jawaharlal Nehru University). These two stories clash and so do their protagonists. One is a student activist and the other is a huge political leader."

=== Casting ===
According to Zafar, the series consists of an ensemble cast which has 11-12 primary characters. Zafar initially planned to bring in big names for the cast, as Saif Ali Khan eventually accepted to play the lead protagonist, Samar Pratap Singh. It marks Saif's second streaming series, after Netflix's Sacred Games. Saif will be shown to be a Chanakya-like political leader who is also the central character of the series.

Saif initially stated, "My character is a politician who tends to talk a lot in public places and so there were a lot of Sanskrit-ized Hindi speeches that I had to prepare for Samar's character. The fun fact here is – I absolutely love speaking Sanskrit. At times we have a heavy shooting day and there are times when we have a lighter day. In this show, I had to speak almost 4 Sanskrit speeches every day. So I had to learn a lot of heavy duty lines."

Dimple Kapadia plays the parallel lead role of Anuradha Kishore, who competes against Samar to become the prime minister. Mohammed Zeeshan Ayyub, plays Shiva Shekhar who is seen essaying the role of a budding politician. Sunil Grover essays the role of Gurpal Chauhan. The supporting cast consists of Sarah-Jane Dias, Kritika Kamra, Kritika Avasthi, Anup Soni and Gauahar Khan.

=== Filming ===
Principal shooting of the series was kickstarted in October 2019. Tandav was mostly shot in Pataudi Palace, Haryana, with Saif stating that "We have shot a lot of sequences for the show in the palace. I have spent maximum time in the palace than anywhere in the world. It's my home so it was extremely comfortable shooting there. I never mind giving it for shoots especially when I am working in any project. It is almost unused for 340 days. I like to think of it as commercial property and am happy to rent it out. But it does make me little bit nervous when the crew moves in. It was a pleasure staying there and shooting there." Rest of the scenes were shot at the Imperial Hotel in Delhi.

It was revealed that most of the shoot had been completed before the government imposed the COVID-19 pandemic lockdown in India in March 2020. As of June 2020, Zafar stated that "The post-production work is under completion, with edit work was underway. As a lot of the work can be done online, it is keeping me busy."

=== Music ===
The background score of the series is composed by Julius Packiam. The series also features an adapted song of "Dhakka Laga Bukka", composed by A. R. Rahman, from the Mani Ratnam-directorial Yuva (2004). On adapting the song, Rahman stated "Abbas Ali called me and said the song was the centre of the whole series. So I said why don't we tweak the lyrics because they were written for something else. So we got together with the lyricist Mehboob Alam and he wrote an extra antara. Now we have a new intro for the song. We were careful about not changing too much of the original. You get a certain magic in the mix of things. This song has aggression, a sense of melody and harmony." The adapted version which had vocals by A. R. Rahman and Nakul Abhyankar, was released directly in YouTube on 13 January 2021.

== Release ==
Amazon Prime Video, announced 20 Indian originals scheduled for a release in 2020, with Tandav being one of them. However, the release was postponed to 2021, citing production delays due to COVID-19 pandemic.

The first teaser of Tandav was released through YouTube on 17 December 2020. On 28 December 2020, posters featuring Saif Ali Khan, Dimple Kapadia, Mohammed Zeeshan Ayyub, Sunil Grover, Gauhar Khan, Kritika Kamra, Sarah Jane Dias and Kumud Misra were released. A new poster was released on 3 January 2021, followed by the trailer on 4 January. The series premiered through Amazon Prime Video on 15 January 2021.

== Reception ==
=== Critical response ===
Writing for The Hindu, Sayan Ghosh called "The series is riddled with cliched tropes and larger-than-life figures, that only provides a glimpse at the project's lost potential". Saibal Chatterjee of NDTV rated the series two out of five stars, writing "Tandav dances to a typically facile Bollywood beat. It presents a cliched take on power-crazy politicians that tells us nothing that we do not already know." Nairita Mukherjee of India Today reviewed "Tandav perhaps intended to be India's House of Cards - suave and well-dressed politicians, with evil brewing inside. But it falls, like that proverbial house of cards." Rohit Vats of News18 gave two out of five stating "The show may pick up in later episodes but first five display all the trappings of a ‘masala’ Bollywood production with absolutely nothing to ponder about once it's over."

Swetha Ramakrishnan of Firstpost rated one-and-a-half out of five reviewed "Tandav should have really been about Gurpal and Maithli's stories. About how these invisible characters who are actually running the political show conspire to make or break governments with their polity, wit and intelligence. Instead, what we get is a poorly researched, campy series that prefers to dumb down its plot assuming Indian audiences need to be spoon-fed Indian politics." Saraswati Datar of The News Minute reviewed "Tandav could have been a gripping political drama that took us into the dark and self-serving alleys of politics and allowed us to understand what it is about political power that makes it so intoxicating. Instead, we get a soap opera that does Tandav with two left feet."

In a positive note, Renuka Vyahare of The Times of India gave three out of five stars and stated "It is engaging but has no bearing on real life, isn't mentally stimulating and gives an impression that you know what's happening in the world, when you don't." Nandini Ramanath of Scroll.in reviewed "Beyond the show's realm lies a forgotten country. But to get there, viewers will need to wait for the events of Tandav to translate into something more meaningful than a game of thrones."

== Controversy ==
The series caused controversy as several leaders of the Bharatiya Janata Party called for its ban and accused the makers and actors of hurting the religious sentiments of Hindus and mocking the Hindu God Shiva in one of the episodes and also described it as being anti-Dalit as a reason for the ban. Following the controversy, Ali Abbas Zafar offered an unconditional apology on behalf of the cast and crew of the show, and said he would make changes in the web-series owing to the concerns raised by the Information and Broadcasting Ministry regarding some portions of the show. Separate FIRs were filed in Uttar Pradesh, Madhya Pradesh, Karnataka and Maharashtra under Sections 153A and 295 of Indian Penal Code (IPC).
