= Tum Bin =

2001 film by Anubhav Sinha

- Film poster
- Directed by: Anubhav Sinha
- Written by: Anubhav Sinha
- Produced by: Bhushan Kumar; Krishan Kumar
- Starring: Priyanshu Chatterjee; Sandali Sinha; Himanshu Malik; Raqesh Bapat; Amrita Prakash
- Cinematography: Vijay Kumar Arora
- Edited by: Sanjib Datta
- Music by: Nikhil-Vinay; T. S. Jarnail; Ravi Pawar
- Production company: T-Series
- Distributed by: AA Films
- Release date: 13 July 2001
- Running time: 158 minutes
- Country: India
- Language: Hindi

Tum Bin (transl. "Without You"), also known as Tum Bin... Love Will Find a Way, is a 2001 Indian Hindi-language romantic drama film written and directed by Anubhav Sinha. The film stars Priyanshu Chatterjee, Sandali Sinha, Himanshu Malik and Raqesh Bapat. The music is composed by Nikhil-Vinay, with lyrics penned by Faaiz Anwar.

The film was remade in Telugu as Ela Cheppanu (2003) starring Tarun and Shriya Saran. A sequel of the film, Tum Bin 2 starring Neha Sharma, Aashim Gulati and Aditya Seal was released in 2016.

== Plot ==
After Amar Shah's accidental death in India, Canada-based Shah Industries is on the verge of collapse. Pia Shah, Amar's fiancée and a Managing Director of Shah Industries, is devastated. Girdhari, his dad, is in shock and unresponsive towards others while Amar's sister and grandmother are in mourning. Inspector D'Mello who is investigating the case is determined to find the person responsible for the accident despite his superiors' indifference towards the case.

Months after Amar's death, a highly respected and talented business worker named Shekhar Malhotra offers to re-build and restore Shah Industries without any compensation, stating Amar met him in India and offered him a job before his death. He is given the chance and goes about the uphill task of making the company viable again. Gradually, Shekhar heals the gaping wound left in the Shah family by Amar's death and they come to accept him as one of the family while he falls in love with Pia. What none of them – except Bosco, Shekhar's friend in Canada – know is that it was Shekhar's jeep that accidentally hit Amar after he swerved to avoid hitting an innocent girl who had walked on to the road, causing his death. Ridden by guilt, Shekhar came to Canada to confess, ask for forgiveness, and do whatever he can for the family.

Abhigyan is a wealthy Canadian industrialist who meets Pia and realizes that she is the right woman for him. He is considering proposing to Pia and helping to rebuild Shah Industries. But Pia has fallen in love with Shekhar. Eventually, a conflict arises between Pia and Shekhar regarding a proposition made by Abhi to take over Shah Industries. Shekhar realizes that Pia does not need his help anymore and decides to return to India.

Pia stops Shekhar while he boards his flight and confesses her feelings for him. Shekhar denies his feelings and boards the plane. Devastated, Pia goes home and gets engaged to Abhi. Inspector D'Mello arrives at the airport from India in search of the person who killed Amar, and arrests Shekhar. They wait, with Bosco, to board the next flight to India. Shekhar calls Pia and tells her how much he loves her and confesses that it was he who hit her fiancé. Being drunk, Shekhar meets with an accident.

Pia feels guilty about falling for the man who caused Amar's death and confesses it to Girdhari, who surprises her by speaking for the first time after his son's death. He tells her that Shekhar had told him the truth when he first visited them and he believes Shekhar. Amar's family then makes Pia realize how much Shekhar has done for the family and that he is like Amar to them. Bosco informs them about Shekhar's accident. Abhi tells a skeptical Pia to go back to Shekhar as he is her true love, and he is consoled by his uncle. Meanwhile, D'Mello sees the family at the hospital, and realizes they need Shekhar more than the law does; he simply closes the case and leaves. The movie ends with Shekhar recovering and uniting with Pia.

== Cast ==
- Priyanshu Chatterjee as Shekhar Malhotra
- Sandali Sinha as Piya
- Himanshu Malik as Abhigyan
- Raqesh Bapat as Amar Shah
- Vikram Gokhale as Girdhari Shah, Amar's father.
- Amrita Prakash as Milli Shah
- Dina Pathak as Amar's grandmother
- Manoj Pahwa as Inspector D'Mello
- Rajesh Khera as Bosco
- Rajendra Gupta as Iftekhar "Ifti"
- Navneet Nishan as Ayesha "Phuphu"
- Vrajesh Hirjee as Iftekhar's Manager

== Production ==
=== Filming ===
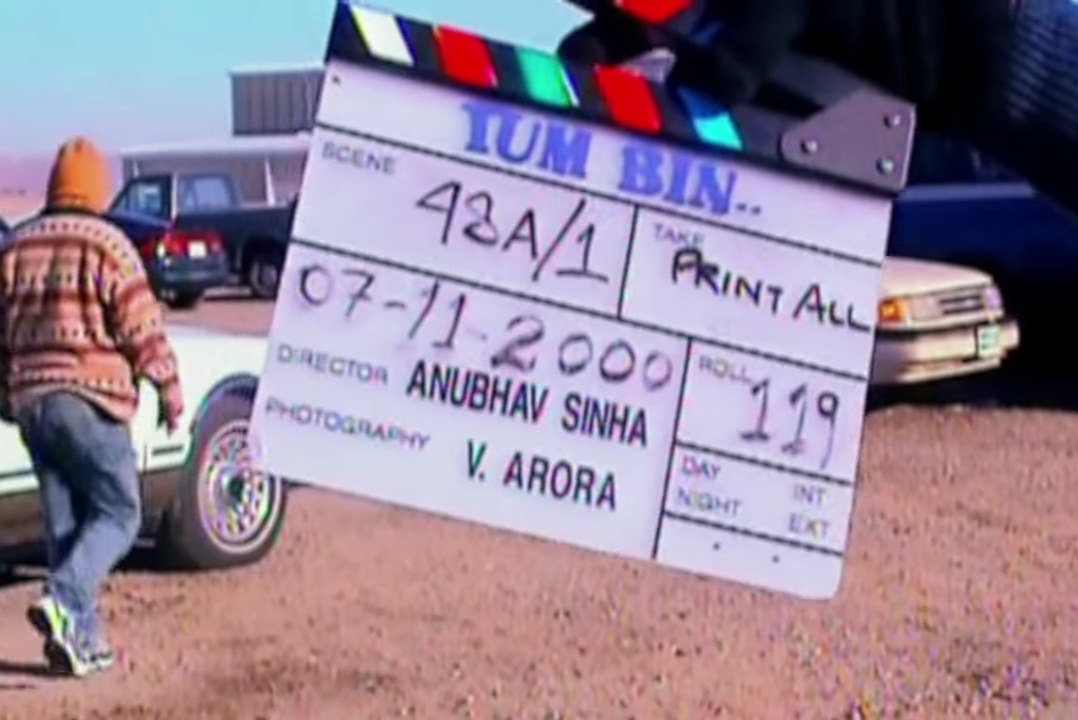
A clapperboard of the film

The principal photography started from November 2000, and the film is mostly shot in Calgary, Canada, while the songs were picturised in Mumbai.

=== Jagjit Singh "Koi Fariyad" controversy ===
During the making of the film, Anubhav Sinha, director, approached Jagjit Singh for the film's background music and soundtrack. During record, Sinha rejected Gazal's "Sher" 81 times, disappointing Singh and made him to leave the task, but soon after, he understood the situation and agreed to complete the Gazal.

Further, Nikhil (music director) said:

‘We wanted a mature song, because the love story had become very serious, so it was decided to take a ghazal. Then, it was decided to choose Jagjit Singh as he was the only person who could do justice to that song. We sang the song to Jagjit ji, he liked it very much. It was a film of youngsters, so the sound was kept new. Did some fusion music. Jagjit ji himself came to the studio several times and dubbed this song. We were satisfied in the beginning, but he himself used to come that let’s do that song once again. So we had five-six antras, of Jagjit Singh, on different days, in different moods, so it took ten days to edit which antara to take or which not to take.

=== Casting ===
At film's initial stage, John Abraham also auditioned for the film but was rejected after a "very bad" tryout.

== Soundtrack ==
Tum Bin

Soundtrack album by Nikhil-Vinay Ravi Pawar T.S.Jarnail
- Released: 2 May 2001
- Genre: Feature film soundtrack
- Label: T-Series

The soundtrack is composed by Nikhil-Vinay, Ravi Pawar and T.S.Jarnail. It was released on 2 May 2001. The lyrics were provided by Faaiz Anwar, Yogesh, Pushpa Patel and T.S. Jarnail. Singers like K.S. Chitra, Shailaja Subramanian, Anuradha Paudwal, Udit Narayan, Sonu Nigam, Jagjit Singh, Abhijeet Bhattacharya and Tarsame Singh Saini lent their voices for the soundtrack. According to the Indian trade website Box Office India, with 2,000,000 units sold, this film's soundtrack album was the year's sixth highest-selling.

=== Track list ===
| No. | Title | Lyrics | Music | Playback | Length |
|---|---|---|---|---|---|
| 1. | "Chhoti Chhoti Raatein" | Faaiz Anwar | Nikhil-Vinay | Anuradha Paudwal, Sonu Nigam | 6:00 |
| 2. | "Daroo Vich Pyar" | T.S. Jarnail | T.S. Jarnail | T.S. Jarnail, Hunterz (Rap) | 4:57 |
| 3. | "Dekhte Hi Dekhte" | Faaiz Anwar | Nikhil-Vinay | Anuradha Paudwal, Abhijeet Bhattacharya | 5:08 |
| 4. | "Koi Fariyaad" | Faaiz Anwar | Nikhil-Vinay | Jagjit Singh | 9:01 |
| 5. | "Meri Duniya Mein- M" | Faaiz Anwar | Nikhil-Vinay | Sonu Nigam | 4:52 |
| 6. | "Meri Duniya Mein- F" | Faaiz Anwar | Nikhil-Vinay | Shailaja Subramanian | 2:57 |
| 7. | "Pyar Humko Hone Laga" | Faaiz Anwar | Nikhil-Vinay | K.S. Chithra, Abhijeet Bhattacharya | 3:13 |
| 8. | "Suru Ru" | Faaiz Anwar | Ravi Pawar | Sonu Nigam | 4:33 |
| 9. | "Tumhare Siwa" | Faaiz Anwar | Nikhil-Vinay | Udit Narayan, Anuradha Paudwal | 4:53 |
| 10. | "Tum Bin" | Faaiz Anwar | Nikhil-Vinay | K.S. Chithra | 5:56 |
| 11. | "Zoom Bumbura" | Faaiz Anwar | Ravi Pawar | Sonu Nigam | 4:27 |
| 12. | "Chhoti Chhoti Raatein II" | Faaiz Anwar | Nikhil-Vinay | Anuradha Paudwal, Sonu Nigam | 3:58 |

== Critical reception ==
Pratiksha Arora of Rediff complimented the first half of the film, but felt the second half of the film "disappoints". Several aspects stood out well, including some of the photography during the songs and the overall story, but felt the music was lacking and the film was too long. Taran Adarsh of IndiaFM gave the film 2 stars out of 5, writing: "On the whole, TUM BIN has gloss, a hit musical score, competent performances, mature direction and a tremendous publicity campaign as its assets. But the screenplay in the second half and the loose editing dilute the impact to an extent. Yet, with some trimming, the film should find patronage from those who enjoy emotional films. However, the big oppositions (Aks and the two hits ? Gadar and Lagaan) will restrict its prospects to an extent. Business in Mumbai should be the best."

== Box office ==
A commercial success at the time of release, earning an estimated ₹8.28 crore (US$860,000) at the box office, against a budget of ₹2 crore (US$210,000).
