= Article 15 (film) =

2019 Indian film by Anubhav Sinha

- Theatrical release poster
- Directed by: Anubhav Sinha
- Written by: Gaurav Solanki; Anubhav Sinha
- Produced by: Anubhav Sinha
- Starring: Ayushmann Khurrana; Nassar; Manoj Pahwa; Kumud Mishra; Isha Talwar; Sayani Gupta; Mohammed Zeeshan Ayyub
- Cinematography: Ewan Mulligan
- Edited by: Yasha Ramchandani
- Music by: Songs: Anurag Saikia; Piyush Shankar; Devin Parkar; Gingger Shankar; Score: Mangesh Dhakde
- Production companies: Benaras Media Works; Zee Studios
- Distributed by: Zee Studios
- Release date: 28 June 2019
- Running time: 130 minutes
- Country: India
- Language: Hindi
- Box office: est. ₹93.08 crore

Article 15 is a 2019 Indian Hindi-language crime drama film directed and produced by Anubhav Sinha, who co-wrote the screenplay with Gaurav Solanki. The film stars Ayushmann Khurrana as a police officer who investigates the disappearance of three girls from a small village, uncovering a history of caste-based oppression. Nassar, Manoj Pahwa, Kumud Mishra, Isha Talwar, Sayani Gupta, Mohammed Zeeshan Ayyub, Sushil Pandey, Veen Harsh and Sumbul Touqeer appear in supporting roles.

The film is named after Article 15 of the Constitution of India, which prohibits discrimination on grounds of religion, race, caste, sex or birthplace. While not based on one specific event, the film is inspired by multiple real-life cases involving crimes driven by caste-based discrimination, including the 2014 Badaun gang rape allegations. Principal photography began on 1 March 2019 in Lucknow. The film's soundtrack was composed by Anurag Saikia, Piyush Shankar, Devin Parker and Gingger with lyrics written by Rashmi Virag, Shakeel Azmi, Slow Cheeta, Dee MC, Kaam Bhaari and SpitFire, released under the banner Zee Music Company.

== Plot ==
Ayan Ranjan, an idealistic Indian Police Service (IPS) officer and St. Stephen's College graduate, is assigned to the rural village of Laalgaon in Uttar Pradesh as the Additional Superintendent of Police. Upon arrival, he is welcomed by local officers Brahmadatt Singh and Kisan Jatav. Ayan immediately encounters deep-rooted caste discrimination, which he routinely discusses over the phone with his wife, Aditi. During his welcoming reception, local villagers plead with the police to find three missing Dalit girls, but their requests are dismissed. At the same gathering, Ayan notices his college friend, Satyendra Rai, a state government employee, behaving suspiciously.

The next morning, two of the missing girls are discovered hanging from a tree, while the third, Pooja, remains missing. Ayan orders Brahmadatt to file a First Information Report (FIR) and secure a postmortem analysis. Although the autopsy reveals the victims were repeatedly gang-raped before being murdered, Brahmadatt suppresses the findings. Instead, he fabricates a narrative claiming the girls were cousin-lovers in an incestuous relationship who were victims of an honor killing by their own fathers. Meanwhile, tensions escalate as activists from the Bhim Sangharsh Sena (BSS), led by a man named Nishad, clash with local authorities to demand immediate justice. Deeply disturbed by the cover-up, Ayan commits himself to solving the case.

Gaura, Pooja's sister, informs Ayan that the girls worked for a local builder, Anshu Naharia, who had assaulted them after they demanded a wage increase of three rupees. Despite Brahmadatt's warnings that Anshu is related to influential Minister Ramlal Naharia, Ayan brings him in for questioning. Anshu callously admits to the assault, stating it was meant to remind the girls' caste of their societal standing. Disgusted by the systemic bigotry within the community and his own police force, Ayan prints and posts Article 15 of the Constitution of India—which prohibits discrimination based on religion, race, caste, sex, or place of birth—on the station bulletin board.

Seeking the truth, Ayan meets with Dr. Malti Ram, the assistant coroner who conducted the autopsies. She confirms that the official report was falsified and that the victims were indeed raped and murdered. Realizing his department is actively conspiring with the politicians, Ayan instructs Malti to secretly take the DNA samples to Lucknow for independent testing against Anshu's DNA. Simultaneously, a local Brahmin politician, Mahantji, stages a public display of inter-caste harmony with a Dalit community leader to secure votes for the upcoming election. Nishad exposes this alliance as a political sham and organizes a protest. Ayan attempts to negotiate with Nishad to call off the strike so police resources can focus on locating Pooja; Nishad refuses to back down but allows a few of his men to assist in the search.

Malti calls Ayan to confirm that the DNA matches Anshu, establishing his direct involvement in the crimes. Armed with an arrest warrant, Ayan raids Anshu's property. While Anshu is missing, Ayan discovers a school bus linked to the night of the abduction and inspects a nearby school owned by the builder. Inside, he uncovers physical evidence of the girls' confinement and torture. It is soon revealed that Brahmadatt was one of the perpetrators; to protect his own identity, Brahmadatt murders Anshu at a secure safehouse.

The central government intervenes, sending CBI officer Panikar to suspend Ayan and halt his investigation. Refusing to comply, Ayan tracks down Satyendra, who confesses that during a heavily intoxicated party hosted by Anshu, he witnessed Anshu, Brahmadatt, and Nihal Singh—another officer on Ayan’s force—gang-rape the girls and subsequently stage their hangings. Confronted with his actions, a remorseful Nihal commits suicide.

Jatav arrests Brahmadatt on Ayan's orders. When Panikar threatens Ayan with professional ruin, Ayan reveals he has already bypassed local authorities and sent the comprehensive evidence directly to the Home Minister. He delivers a fierce critique of the institutionalized caste bias plaguing the justice system. Ayan then coordinates a massive search party through a treacherous swamp. They successfully locate a severely dehydrated Pooja hiding inside a concrete pipe in the jungle. Based on Pooja's eyewitness testimony, Brahmadatt is convicted and sentenced to eleven years in prison, while Mahantji secures a landslide victory in the local elections.

== Cast ==
- Ayushmann Khurrana as SP Ayan Ranjan IPS, Aditi's husband
- Sayani Gupta as Gaura, Pooja's sister, one of the victims
- Kumud Mishra as Sub Inspector Kisan Jatav
- Nassar as CBI Officer Panikar
- Manoj Pahwa as Circle Officer Brahmadutt Thakur Singh
- Isha Talwar as Aditi Ranjan, Ayan's wife
- Aakash Dabhade as Satyendra Rai
- Veen Harsh as Anshu Naharia
- Mohammed Zeeshan Ayyub as Nishad, Gaura's boyfriend
- Ronjini Chakraborty as Dr. Malti Ram
- Sumbul Touqeer as Amali Singh, Nihal's younger sister
- Sushil Pandey as Nihal Singh
- Ashish Verma as Mayank
- Shubhrajyoti Barat as Chandrabhan
- Shikha Valmiki as Shanu
- Isha Verma as Mamta
- Suchi as Pooja
- Alim Naqvi as Ramlal Naharia
- Nawal Shukla as Mahantji
- Kapil Tilhari as Officer Pramod Yadav
- Varun Tamta as Officer Mishra
- Noor Ahmed Tuba as Officer Vijay Seth
- Shreya Awasthi as Archana Rai
- Shivam Singh as Bachchu Rai
- Iccha Shankar as Shanti Prasad
- Tariq Iqbal as Dr. Awdhesh
- Uday Vir Singh Yadav as Sukkha Singh
- Vivek Yadav as Nokhai
- R.D. Singh as Subodh Lal

== Production ==
=== Development ===
The storyline of the film is based on the socio-political situation of the country, post-independence time drawing inferences from true-life events researched over the last 6 months, akin to Mulk. Giving details on the film, Anubhav Sinha stated that "this film is an investigative drama where the audience too is an accused party ... A very challenging film that needed an extraordinary actor like Ayushmann."

=== Filming ===
Principal photography began on 1 March 2019 in Lucknow. During filming, Ayushmann Khurrana and the team entered into a swamp filled with leeches to shoot scenes of the film. Filming was concluded in April 2019.

== Release ==
=== Theatrical ===
Article 15 had been selected as the opening film for the 10th edition of London Indian Film Festival to be premiered on 20 June. It was released in India on 28 June 2019.

=== Home media ===
It was made available for streaming on Netflix.

== Reception ==
=== Critical response ===
Article 15 received critical acclaim. On review aggregator website Rotten Tomatoes, the film holds a rating of 90% based on 20 reviews, with an average rating of 7.6/10.

Anna M. M. Vetticad of Firstpost concurred with Sengupta and Sharma, gave four and a half stars out of five and found 'Sinha's unfaltering direction' was backed by Ewan Mulligan's 'unsparing cinematography' and a 'strong cast'. Concluding, she wrote, "Watching this film is an overwhelming emotional experience," and she opined, Article 15 is the best that Indian cinema can be in these troubled times if it chooses to hold a mirror up to our society..." Raja Sen writing for Hindustan Times rated the film with four and a half star out of five and opined that the film is a tribute to Alan Parker the director of 1988 film Mississippi Burning. He praised Solanki and Sinha for honest writing, haunting shots by Mulligan and performances of ensemble. Ending his writing, he said, "Article 15 is not a film in search of easy answers. Instead, it is a reminder that we already know the questions but don't ask them enough. 'Not cool, sir'." Vijayalakshmi Narayanan of Radio City gave the film four and a half stars out of five, and said "Coming to the cast, Ayushmann leads from the front and one cannot be thankful enough. The actor proves his mettle yet again when it comes to backing good scripts. He makes the right noise even in his moments of melancholy."

Sreeparna Sengupta of The Times of India gave the film four stars out of five, praising the performance of Ayushmann Khurrana, Manoj Pahwa, Kumud Mishra and Mohammed Zeeshan Ayyub, and background music and cinematography of Ewan Mulligan as well. She felt that Sinha had given another dimension to the narrative by surfacing the artful shades through the characters and setting. She opines, "Anubhav Sinha's Article 15 is designed like a crime thriller. What works for the film is that it's thought-provoking, hard-hitting while unflinchingly bringing to light burning social issues." Concluding, she wrote that the film is not a 'light watch', rather it is 'definitely relevant', 'compelling' and will start a debate. Devesh Sharma reviewing for Filmfare rates the film with four stars out of five. He praised the screenplay, dialogues, and cinematography of the film apart from the performance of Khurrana and the supporting cast. He recommends watching the film for its 'riveting performances' and its 'underlying message', and opines that the film presents the candid truth about contemporary society. Quoting Jack Nicholson's character from A Few Good Men – "You can't handle the truth," he hopes that the audience goes out to watch the film and 'learns to handle the truth...' Priyanka Sinha Jha of News18, praising Khurrana and ensemble of Kumud Sharma, Manoj Pahwa, Sayani Gupta, Mohammed Zeeshan Ayyub, and M Nassar for their performances, rates the film with four stars out of five. Agreeing with Vetticad, she writes, "Article 15 is remarkable in that it does not pontificate. It merely holds up the mirror to a society still entangled in age-old caste politics that absolutely overrides the modern ideals of liberty and equality." Concluding, she opines that Sinha has a knack for combining elements of popular film-making with realistic story-telling to give masterful films. Writing for the NDTV Saibal Chatterjee, termed it a 'radical' film, tackling social issues. He praised Sinha and Gaurav Solanki for the screenplay and cast for effective performances. He concludes the review as, "[The film] remains true to the demands of the plot without losing control over its principal purpose – administering a bitter pill with just a hint of a sugar coating. It works wonderfully well. Article 15 is a not to be missed film." Harish Wankhede in the Indian Express review praised the film for its nuanced depiction of Dalit characters but also criticised the film for not showcasing the Dalit person as a protagonist.

Mayur Sanap of Deccan Chronicle rated it four stars out of five and found it a 'gripping social thriller'. He commended the performances and script, and concludes, "With Anubhav Sinha's straightforward and unflashy directorial style, the film proves to be an effective drama. It may be devoid of spectacle, but it is still full of zeal and warrants a must-watch." Manjusha Radhakrishnan of Gulf News gave four stars out of five, and felt that the film was not easy to watch, however everyone should give it a chance. She opined, "Article 15 sobers you up instantly, but it also makes you think about Indian's complicated social segregation based on the accident of birth." Lakshana N Palat of India Today rated it with three and a half stars out of five, praised the performances of the cast and felt that the film's 'overly optimistic ending' was not in tune. According to him, despite rough around the edges and flawed in storytelling, it is worth watching. Agreeing with Sengupta, he opines, "It's a start. It cannot change society, but it at least can initiate a conversation and debate that examines the horrors that lurk in this very society, invisible to our privileged eyes." Bollywood Hungama rated the film three and a half stars out of five and praised Mulligan for cinematography, Nikhil Kovale for production design, Sinha and Solanki for story and screenplay. He commended performances of ensemble and direction of Sinha and felt that the look of the film was 'quite rich' and 'haunting', and that worked. He summed up the review as, "On the whole, ARTICLE 15 is a hard-hitting film that raises some important issues related to caste, that is plaguing the country." Kunal Guha of Mumbai Mirror rated the film with three stars out of five and felt that it reminded of hateful atrocities, and wrote, "The film, however, gets a bit tiring in parts when the message seems to be incessantly hammered down." However, he praised the performances of the ensemble.

Other critics, including Rahul Ramchandani of The Milli Gazette and Pardeep Attri of HuffPost India, noted the film's portrayal of an upper-caste Brahmin policeman as a "saviour" to the Dalit. Dominique of Firstpost criticised the director for focusing less on Dalit characters and more on Brahmin (upper-caste) ones just to make them "shine more brightly". An academic Shyaonti Talwar noted that the film shied away from complexities of the caste system and rather oversimplified the issue by repeating the "'Brahmin-saviour' complex" done by other critically acclaimed Indian films and making a Brahmin protagonist of an "Aryan lineage" the hero.

=== Box office ===
Article 15 had the opening day collection of ₹5.02 crore and opening weekend worldwide gross of ₹30.75 crore. In its opening week, the film grossed ₹47.62 crore worldwide. With a gross of ₹77.62 crore from India and ₹13.78 crore from overseas, as of 31 July 2019, the film has grossed ₹91.70 crore worldwide.

== Remake ==
In May 2020, it was announced that Arunraja Kamaraj would be directing Nenjuku Needhi, the Tamil remake of the film. Udhayanidhi Stalin was roped in to reprise Khurrana's role while Tanya Ravichandran reprised the role done by Isha Talwar. It was released on 20 May 2022.

== Awards and nominations ==
List of awards and nominations
Award	Date of ceremony	Category	Recipient(s)	Result	Ref(s)
Screen Awards	8 December 2019	Best Film (Critics)	—N/a	Won	
Screen Awards	8 December 2019	Best Director (Critics)	Anubhav Sinha	Won	
Screen Awards	8 December 2019	Best Actor (Critics)	Ayushmann Khurrana	Won	
Screen Awards	8 December 2019	Best Story	Anubhav Sinha and Gaurav Solanki	Won	
Screen Awards	8 December 2019	Best Screenplay	Anubhav Sinha and Gaurav Solanki	Won	
Screen Awards	8 December 2019	Best Cinematography	Ewan Mulligan	Nominated	
Filmfare Awards	15 February 2020	Best Film (Critics)	Anubhav Sinha (tied with Abhishek Chaubey for Sonchiriya)	Won	
Filmfare Awards	15 February 2020	Best Actor (Critics)	Ayushmann Khurrana	Won	
Filmfare Awards	15 February 2020	Best Story	Anubhav Sinha and Gaurav Solanki	Won	
Filmfare Awards	15 February 2020	Best Screenplay	Anubhav Sinha and Gaurav Solanki	Nominated	
Filmfare Awards	15 February 2020	Best Dialogue	Anubhav Sinha and Gaurav Solanki	Nominated	
Filmfare Awards	15 February 2020	Best Supporting Actor	Manoj Pahwa	Nominated	
Filmfare Awards	15 February 2020	Best Background Score	Mangesh Dhakde	Nominated	
Filmfare Awards	15 February 2020	Best Cinematography	Ewan Mulligan	Nominated	
Filmfare Awards	15 February 2020	Best Editing	Yasha Ramchandani	Nominated	
Filmfare Awards	15 February 2020	Best Production Design	Nikhil Kovale	Nominated	
Filmfare Awards	15 February 2020	Best Sound Design	Kaamod L Kharade	Nominated	
Zee Cine Awards	March 2020	Best Film (Critics)	Anubhav Sinha	Won	
Zee Cine Awards	March 2020	Best Actor	Ayushmann Khurrana	Nominated	
Zee Cine Awards	March 2020	Best Story	Anubhav Sinha and Gaurav Solanki	Won	
Zee Cine Awards	March 2020	Best Screenplay	Anubhav Sinha and Gaurav Solanki	Won	
Zee Cine Awards	March 2020	Best Background Score	Mangesh Dhakde	Won	
Zee Cine Awards	March 2020	Best Cinematography	Ewan Mulligan	Nominated	

== Soundtrack ==
Article 15

Soundtrack album by Anurag Saikia, Piyush Shankar, Devin Parkar and Gingger
- Released: 14 June 2019
- Recorded: 2013
- Genre: Feature film soundtrack
- Length: 26:55
- Language: Hindi
- Label: Zee Music Company

Anurag Saikia chronology
Mulk (2018)	Article 15 (2019)	Thappad (2020)
External audio
- Audio Jukebox on YouTube

The music of the film is composed by Anurag Saikia, Piyush Shankar, Devin Parker, and Gingger while lyrics are written by Rashmi Virag, Shakeel Azmi, Slow Cheeta, Dee MC, Kaam Bhaari, and Spit Fire. The Times of India based Debarati S Sen, in her review, said the album is "a fine example of original songs finding its way back into the Hindi film industry".

Track listing
No.	Title	Lyrics	Music	Singer(s)	Length
1.	"Naina Yeh"	Rashmi Virag	Piyush Shankar	Yasser Desai, Akanksha Sharma	5:29
2.	"Intezari"	Shakeel Azmi	Anurag Saikia	Armaan Malik	5:08
3.	"Intezari" (Unplugged)	Shakeel Azmi	Anurag Saikia	Ayushmann Khurrana	4:46
4.	"Intezari" (Asees Version)	Shakeel Azmi	Anurag Saikia	Asees Kaur	4:35
5.	"Kahab Toh"	Shakeel Azmi	Anurag Saikia	Sayani Gupta	3:12
6.	"Shuru Karein Kya"	Slow Cheeta, Dee MC, Kaam Bhaari, Spit Fire	Devin Parker, Gingger	Slow Cheeta, Dee MC, Kaam Bhaari, Spit Fire	3:45
Total length:					26:55

== Home media ==
The film became available as VOD on Netflix in August 2019.
