= Tum Bin 2 =

2016 film by Anubhav Sinha

- Theatrical release poster
- Directed by: Anubhav Sinha
- Screenplay by: Anubhav Sinha
- Produced by: Bhushan Kumar; Krishan Kumar; Anubhav Sinha
- Starring: Aashim Gulati; Neha Sharma; Aditya Seal
- Cinematography: Ewan Mulligan
- Edited by: Farooq Hundekar
- Music by: Ankit Tiwari; Nikhil-Vinay; Gourov-Roshin; Zack Knight
- Production companies: T-Series; Benaras Media Works
- Distributed by: AA Films
- Release date: 18 November 2016
- Running time: 147 minutes
- Country: India
- Language: Hindi
- Budget: ₹12 crore
- Box office: est. ₹6.45 crore

Tum Bin 2 (transl. Without you) is a 2016 Indian Hindi-language romantic drama film, written and directed by Anubhav Sinha. It was produced by Sinha and Bhushan Kumar, under the T-Series banner. It is a standalone sequel to the 2001 film, Tum Bin. The film was released on 18 November 2016 and it was disaster at the box office.

== Plot ==
The film centers around the life of Taran (Neha Sharma), who loses her fiancé Amar (Aashim Gulati) in a skiing accident. Her life changes when she meets Shekhar Malhotra (Aditya Seal), whom she initially sees as a good friend but soon develops feelings for. Eventually, she shares a kiss with Shekhar, marking the start of her process of moving on with her life.

The plot takes a sudden twist when it is revealed that Amar has survived the accident and has been in a coma as an unidentified patient for the last eight months. He returns home after regaining consciousness. On learning of Amar's return, Shekhar decides to distance himself from Taran and her family. Eventually, Taran realizes that she continues to have feelings for Shekhar and tells Amar about what happened when he was away. Together they decide to break up and stay close friends. Taran goes back to dating Shekhar. What Amar does not tell Taran is that he is only pretending to be okay with the breakup. In reality, he is miserable without her. In the meantime, Shekhar starts to notice that though Taran is dating him, she too misses Amar. When he speaks to Taran about this, she confesses to having chosen him over Amar because "it was the right thing to do," especially after all Shekhar had done for her in Amar's absence. Once, when Taran runs off to help Amar, Shekhar gets very upset and refuses to speak to Taran for a number of days. Eventually, he calls Taran to inform her that he's leaving the country.

The plot takes another twist when, trying to find Shekhar, Taran, accompanied by Amar, and his father (Kanwaljit Singh) discover that Shekhar was responsible for Amar's accident. In a further twist, Amar's father confesses that he knew this all along. He also tells of Shekhar coming to him seeking forgiveness for the accident. And how he not only forgave Shekhar but also started seeing him as a son. He also confesses to having intentionally introduced Shekhar to Taran and her family in the hope of helping Taran overcome her grief.

On learning all of this, Taran, along with Amar and his father, hurry to the airport, where they spot Shekhar about to board a plane. Eventually, Shekhar prevails over Taran, explaining that dating him because "it was the right thing to do" is not enough and she should be with the one she loves the most. He eventually hugs both Taran and Amar and departs tearfully. Taran hugs Amar but looks tearfully at Shekhar departing.

== Cast ==
- Aashim Gulati as Amar
- Neha Sharma as Taran
- Aditya Seal as Shekhar Malhotra
- Kanwaljit Singh as Amar's father
- Sonia Balani as Gurpreet Kaur
- Meher Vij as Manpreet Kaur
- Ishwak Singh as Harry
- Aisha Ahmed as Sharanpreet
- Jaipreet Singh as Navjot
- Hardy Sandhu as himself in a special appearance for the song "Nachna Aonda Ni"
- Raftaar as himself in a special appearance for the song "Nachna Aonda Ni"
- Mouni Roy as herself in a special appearance for the song "Nachana Aonda Ni"
- Neha Kakkar as herself in a special appearance for the song "Nachana Aonda Ni"
- Sandali Sinha as Pia Varma (in a special appearance)

== Production ==
=== Filming ===
The official announcement of the film was in March 2016 and the principal photography commenced in April 2016. The film was released on 18 November 2016. The film was shot mainly in Glasgow and other regions in Scotland.

== Soundtrack ==
The soundtrack of the movie was composed by Ankit Tiwari with lyrics written by Manoj Muntashir, except for the track "Teri Fariyad" which was written by Shakeel Azmi based on the original ghazal by Faaiz Anwar.

Tum Bin 2

Soundtrack album by Ankit Tiwari
- Released: 21 October 2016
- Genre: Feature film soundtrack
- Length: 53:30
- Label: T-Series

=== Track listing ===
No.	Title	Lyrics	Music	Singer(s)	Length
1.	"Teri Fariyad"	Shakeel Azmi (Based on the original ghazal by Faaiz Anwar)	Ankit Tiwari (Original composition by Nikhil-Vinay)	Jagjit Singh, Rekha Bhardwaj	03:06
2.	"Ishq Mubarak"	Manoj Muntashir	Ankit Tiwari	Arijit Singh, Shubhanshu Kesarwani Ankit Tiwari	04:56
3.	"Dekh Lena"	Manoj Muntashir	Ankit Tiwari	Arijit Singh, Tulsi Kumar	04:41
4.	"Jaeger Bomb"	Manoj Muntashir (English lyrics by Raool)	Ankit Tiwari	Ankit Tiwari, Harshi Mad	03:42
5.	"Tum Bin"	Manoj Muntashir	Ankit Tiwari	Ankit Tiwari	06:56
6.	"Ki Kariye Nachna Aaonda Nahin"	Kumaar (Rap lyrics by Raftaar)	Gourov-Roshin	Neha Kakkar, Hardy Sandhu, Raftaar	03:57
7.	"Teri Fariyaad – Extended Version"	Shakeel Azmi (Based on the original ghazal by Faaiz Anwar)	Ankit Tiwari (Original composition by Nikhil-Vinay)	Jagjit Singh, Rekha Bhardwaj	10:35
8.	"Masta"	Manoj Muntashir	Ankit Tiwari	Vishal Dadlani, Neeti Mohan	03:51
9.	"Ishq Mubarak – Refix"	Manoj Muntashir, Zack Knight	Ankit Tiwari, Zack Knight	Arijit Singh, Zack Knight	03:32
10.	"Dekh Lena – Unplugged"	Manoj Muntashir	Ankit Tiwari	Tulsi Kumar	04:48
11.	"Dil Nawaziyaan"	Manoj Muntashir (English lyrics by Arko)	Ankit Tiwari	Ankit Tiwari, Arko, Payal Dev	03:21
Total length:					53:30
