= Gaurav Solanki (writer) =

Indian writer (born 1986)

Gaurav Solanki (born 7 July, 1986) is an Indian fiction writer, poet, screenwriter and lyricist. He has written songs for Ugly, Daas Dev and Veere Di Wedding. In 2012, he was awarded Jnanpeeth's Navlekhan Puraskar, which he refused to accept. He wrote the screenplay for the much acclaimed film Article 15.

== Early life and education ==
Gaurav Solanki was born in Meerut (Uttar Pradesh) and grew up in Sangaria (Rajasthan). He graduated from IIT Roorkee.

== Career ==
His first break in films was Anurag Kashyap's Ugly (2014) for which he wrote lyrics. Kashyap also bought the rights to his story "Hisar mein Hahakar". Solanki wrote songs for Daas Dev (2018) and Veere Di Wedding (2018). His screenplay Nisaar was selected for Drishyam Films Sundance Institute Screenwriters Lab, 2016. In 2019, he wrote the film Article 15. He also wrote the web series Tandav in 2021.

== Books ==
Solanki's first short-story collection, Gyrahvin-A ke Ladke, was released at the Jaipur Literature Festival in 2018. It was among the top three Hindi books in the Dainik Jagran Nielsen Bookscan bestseller list in its first quarter.

== Filmography ==
=== Film ===
Year	Title	Credited as
2014	Ugly	Lyricist
2018	Daas Dev	Lyricist
2018	Veere Di Wedding	Lyricist
2019	Article 15	Writer
2026	Assi	Writer

=== Television ===
Year	Title	Credited as	Platform	Notes
2021	Tandav	Writer	Amazon Prime Video	
