= Anubhav Sinha =

Indian filmmaker (born 1965)

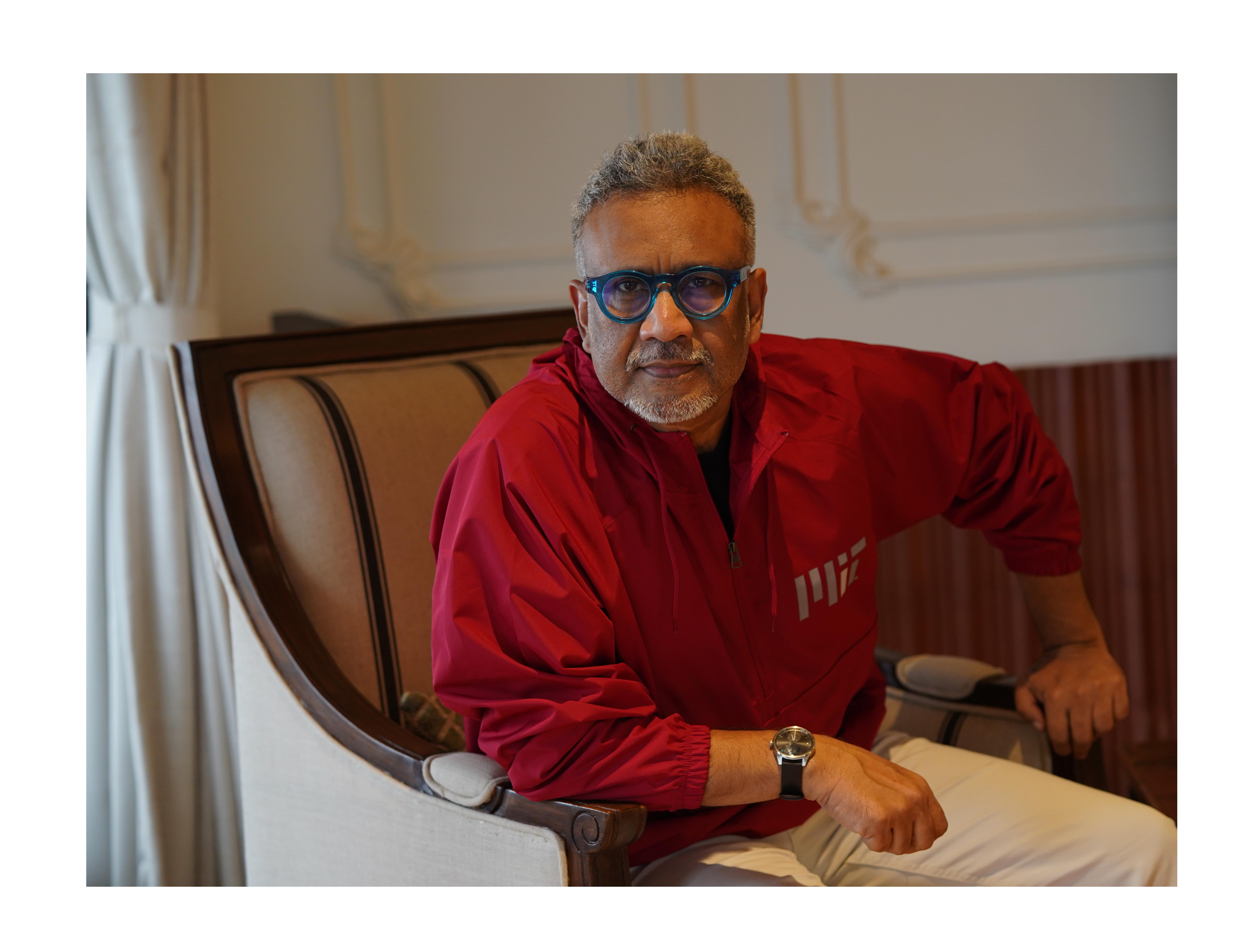
- Sinha in 2024
- Born: 22 June 1965 (age 61); Allahabad, Uttar Pradesh, India
- Education: Aligarh Muslim University
- Occupations: Film director; producer; screenwriter
- Years active: 1993–present
- Spouse: Ratnaa Sinha (m. 2001)
- Children: 1

Anubhav Sinha (born 22 June 1965) is an Indian film director, producer and writer known for his work in Hindi film industry. His films include Tum Bin (2001), Dus (2005), and Ra.One (2011). He also directed a series of socio-political films Mulk (2018), Article 15 (2019), Thappad (2020), Anek (2022), and Bheed (2023). His latest Netflix series is IC 814: The Kandahar Hijack (2024).

== Early life and education ==
Anubhav Sinha was born on Tuesday, June 22, 1965 in Allahabad (now Prayagraj), Uttar Pradesh, India to Prem Govind Sinha and Sushila Sinha. He went to school in Kalagarh, Garhwal, Government Inter College, Allahabad and Queen's College, Varanasi. He completed his graduation in Mechanical Engineering from The Aligarh Muslim University in 1987.

== Career ==
Sinha worked for one year in New Delhi as a theatre artist before moving to Mumbai on 4 December 1990. He began his career in the entertainment industry with TV shows like Sea Hawks and then a spate of music videos in the late 90s. He worked as an assistant director to Pankaj Parashar until 1994 before branching out as an independent director for television for Zee TV. He was noticed for his work on Shikast, the flagship show of the TV network in Mumbai. This was followed by the TV show Sea Hawks for UTV. Sea Hawks was the number one show for 35 weeks across all networks. 72 episodes later, he turned to directing music videos.

In 2000, he left working on music videos to start his first feature film Tum Bin. It starred Priyanshu Chatterjee, Sandali Sinha, Himanshu Malik and Raqesh Vashisth. It went on to become a major box-office success and has gained a cult status over the years.

Sinha's second feature Aapko Pehle Bhi Kahin Dekha Hai stars Priyanshu Chatterjee and Sakshi Shivanand. His third film, the multi-starrer Dus, was the eighth highest-grossing film of the year 2005. This was followed by Tathastu (2006) and Cash (2007).

Sinha directed Shah Rukh Khan, Arjun Rampal and Kareena Kapoor starrer superhero film, Ra.One for which he wrote the script as well along with Kanika Dhillon. He then directed and produced Tum Bin II and Mulk.

In 2019, Sinha produced and directed Article 15 under his production house Benaras Media Works with Ayushmann Khurrana in the lead. The film is based on Article 15 of the Indian Constitution, which is about prohibition of discrimination on grounds of religion, race, caste, sex or place of birth.

In 2020, Sinha helmed Thappad starring Taapsee Pannu, which released on 28 February 2020, and received highly positive reviews from critics, but was a flop at the box-office.

Sinha is also the founder and owner of Benaras Mediaworks, the production company that he established in 2012 to produce his films and television projects.

== Filmography ==
=== Films ===
Year	Title	Director	Writer	Producer
2001	Tum Bin	Yes	Yes	No
2003	Aapko Pehle Bhi Kahin Dekha Hai	Yes	Yes	No
2005	Dus	Yes	No	No
2006	Tathastu	Yes	No	No
2007	Cash	Yes	No	Yes
2011	Ra.One	Yes	Yes	No
2013	Warning	No	No	Yes
2014	Gulaab Gang	No	No	Yes
2014	Zid	No	No	Yes
2016	Tum Bin 2	Yes	Yes	Yes
2018	Mulk	Yes	Yes	Yes
2019	Article 15	Yes	Yes	Yes
2020	Thappad	Yes	Yes	Yes
2022	Anek	Yes	Yes	Yes
2022	Middle Class Love	No	No	Yes
2022	Faraaz	No	No	Yes
2023	Bheed	Yes	Yes	Yes
2023	Afwaah	No	No	Yes
2026	Assi	Yes	Yes	Yes

=== Television ===
Year	Title	Creator	Director	Writer	Producer
1993	Shikast	No	Yes	No	No
1997	Sea Hawks	No	Yes	Yes	No
2024	IC 814: The Kandahar Hijack	Yes	Yes	No	Yes

== Awards and nominations ==
List of Anubhav Sinha awards and nominations
Year	Category	Nominated work	Result	Ref.
AACTA Awards
2020	Best Asian Film	Thappad	Nominated	
International Indian Film Academy Awards
2020	Best Film	Article 15	Nominated	
2020	Best Director	Article 15	Nominated	
2020	Best Story	Article 15	Nominated	
2020	Best Screenplay	Article 15	Won	
2022	Best Film	Thappad	Nominated	
2022	Best Director	Thappad	Nominated	
2022	Best Dialogue	Thappad	Won	
Filmfare Awards
2019	Best Story	Mulk	Won	
2019	Best Dialogue	Mulk	Nominated	
2019	Best Screenplay	Mulk	Nominated	
2020	Best Film (Critics)	Article 15	Won	
2020	Best Story	Article 15	Won	
2020	Best Dialogue	Article 15	Nominated	
2020	Best Screenplay	Article 15	Nominated	
2021	Best Film	Thappad	Won	
2021	Best Film (Critics)	Thappad	Nominated	
2021	Best Director	Thappad	Nominated	
2021	Best Story	Thappad	Won	
2021	Best Screenplay	Thappad	Nominated	
2024	Best Film (Critics)	Bheed	Nominated	
2024	Best Story	Bheed	Nominated	
Screen Awards
2002	Best Story	Tum Bin	Nominated	
2019	Best Film	Mulk	Nominated	
2019	Best Film (Critics)	Mulk	Nominated	
2019	Best Director	Mulk	Nominated	
2020	Best Film (Critics)	Article 15	Won	
2020	Best Film Writing (Story & Screenplay)	Article 15	Won	
Zee Cine Awards
2019	Best Film (Critics)	Mulk	Nominated	
2019	Best Director	Mulk	Nominated	
2020	Best Story & Screenplay	Article 15	Won	
