= Mulk (film) =

2018 Indian film directed by Anubhav Sinha

- Directed by: Anubhav Sinha
- Written by: Anubhav Sinha
- Produced by: Deepak Mukut; Anubhav Sinha
- Starring: Rishi Kapoor; Taapsee Pannu
- Cinematography: Ewan Mulligan; Kavita Sachdeva Wani
- Edited by: Ballu Saluja
- Music by: Songs: Prasad Sashte; Anurag Saikia; Score: Mangesh Dhakde
- Production companies: Benaras Media Works; Soham Rockstar Entertainment
- Distributed by: Zee Studios
- Release date: 3 August 2018
- Running time: 140 minutes
- Country: India
- Language: Hindi
- Budget: ₹19 crore
- Box office: ₹28.33 crore

Mulk (Hindi pronunciation: [mʊlk]; transl. Country) is a 2018 Indian Hindi-language legal drama film written, produced and directed by Anubhav Sinha. The film is set against the backdrop of a Muslim family and was distributed by Zee Studios. Filmed across in Varanasi and Lucknow, it stars Rishi Kapoor and Taapsee Pannu.

The story centers around the life of a Muslim family, who tries to reclaim its lost honor after a family member gets involved in terrorism. The supporting cast of the film includes Rajat Kapoor, Manoj Pahwa, Prateik Babbar, Ashutosh Rana, Neena Gupta, Prachee Shah Paandya and Indraneil Sengupta.

Initially slated to open in cinemas on 13 July 2018, Mulk eventually released in theatres on 3 August 2018. Succeeding commercially to recoup its budget, Mulk earned widespread acclaim for its story, screenplay, execution and cast portrayals and has received awards such as the Best Story and Best Film at Filmfare Awards.

== Plot ==
Mulk revolves around the struggles of a Muslim joint family from a town in India, who fight to reclaim their honor after a member of their family takes to terrorism.

Murad Ali Mohammed (Rishi Kapoor), a lawyer by profession, lives amiably with his family in a densely populated diverse locality of Varanasi. His daily routine includes Namaz at a nearby mosque followed by some chit-chat over a cup of tea from a tea stall managed and owned by one of his close Hindu neighbors. His close-knit family consists of his wife Tabassum (Neena Gupta), brother Bilaal (Manoj Pahwa) who owns a mobile phone shop, sister-in-law Chhoti-Tabassum (Prachee Shah Pandya), nephew Shahid (Prateik Babbar) and niece Aayat (Eshita Singh, credited as Vartika Singh). Murad's son Aftab (Indraneil Sengupta) lives abroad with his wife Aarti (Taapsee Pannu), who is also a lawyer and is estranged from the family.

The story begins on the day of Murad's 65th birthday, when Aarti comes to visit them. The family enjoys a lovely night with their neighbors and friends. Another story is shown in parallel, where it is revealed that Shahid has joined hands with a terrorist organization headed by the wanted Mehfooz Alam (Sumit Kaul), who assigns Shahid to carry out a bomb blast. After Murad's birthday celebrations, Shahid leaves early morning for Allahabad and executes the attack as planned with two other acquaintances, which causes a lot of casualties.

SSP Danish Javed (Rajat Kapoor) is assigned to investigate. He tracks down everyone involved with the attack, corners Shahid and finally shoots him dead as he tries to escape instead of surrendering. Soon, the police arrive at Murad's house and start interrogating the family members. They turn the place upside down to gather evidence. As the news spreads, people start to flock outside Murad's house. Bilaal is taken into custody for further interrogation. Aarti steps up his defense lawyer. Danish interrogates Bilaal for over 17 hours but gets no useful information.

Within a matter of hours, the situation around Murad's neighborhood changes drastically. Everyone whom Murad had known for decades starts looking at him as a terrorist, with his life's reputation and goodwill shattered in a day. Bilaal is taken to court for a hearing where Judge Harish Madhok (Kumud Mishra) denies his bail and grants police custody of him for 7 days for further interrogation. After postmortem, the police bring Shahid's body to Murad, which he refuses to accept. Despite him strongly condemning his nephew's atrocity, the situation worsens around Murad's neighborhood, with the people trying to shame them in every possible way. Stones get pelted inside the house and "Go back to Pakistan" is written on their boundary wall. On the other hand, some extremist Muslims try to convince Murad that Shahid has sacrificed his life in the name of Jihad and all the Muslims should rise up against the Hindu dominant society, but Murad strongly opposes this. Through everything, the family maintains their composure and relies on legal procedures to get their names cleared.

As the legal proceedings begin after 7 days, public prosecutor Santosh Anand (Ashutosh Rana) tries to convince the court that Shahid's act is not a standalone incident but an eye opener about how Muslims are breeders of terrorists. He argues that every single member of Murad's family was aware of and complicit in Shahid's activities, and his home was the den of terrorist operations. As evidence, he presents Shahid's laptop which contains detailed procedures of how to make bombs, a transmitter which was installed at Murad's home to communicate with the terrorists via private frequencies, and CCTV footage of Bilaal giving a lift to Mefooz Alam and selling SIM cards to terrorists without asking for any valid documents. He requests the judge to also consider Murad a person of interest in this case and remove him as Bilaal's defense lawyer. The court agrees and Murad is forced to step down, so Aarti takes his place.

With things turning against him at court, Bilaal, who is already tired, ashamed, confused, saddened, tortured and humiliated, suffers a massive heart attack and passes away en route to the hospital. With Murad's family having suffered another setback, everything comes down to Aarti to get her father-in-law and his family acquitted of all the charges against them.

Aarti justifies in court that there is no concrete evidence any of the family members aside from Shahid were involved with terrorism. Shahid was the only person in the household who knew how to use a laptop and the transmitter was installed by him under the excuse of boosting their cable TV signal. Since he had access to his father's mobile shop, Shahid took those SIM cards without any documents and used them to communicate with the terrorists. Bilaal had no idea who Mehfooz Alam was and so when he came to meet Shahid, Bilaal assumed him to be his son's friend and offered him a ride to the railway station since he was also heading in the same direction. Aarti also argues that it has become accepted for people to generalize all Muslims as terrorists, to the point someone just growing a beard or practicing Islam becomes a terrorist in the public eye. Due to this established taboo, Murad and his family are going through a horrible trauma and humiliation, which even claimed Bilaal's life.

Santosh fails to produce any further proof and the court concludes that all evidences against Murad and his family are circumstantial, thereby dropping all charges against them. Judge Madhok dismisses the case, stating that the main problem is with people's mentality and everyone irrespective of their religion should fight against it to bring a change.

The movie ends with the moral that we should change our way of thinking from "Us and Them" to "We".

== Cast ==
- Rishi Kapoor as Advocate Murad Ali Mohammed
- Taapsee Pannu as Advocate Aarti Malhotra Mohammed, Murad's daughter-in-law
- Rajat Kapoor as SSP Danish Javed
- Ashutosh Rana as Public Prosecutor Santosh Anand
- Manoj Pahwa as Bilal Ali Mohammed, Murad's brother
- Prateik Babbar as Shahid Ali Mohammed, Murad's nephew
- Neena Gupta as Tabassum Ali Mohammed, Murad's wife
- Kumud Mishra as Judge Harish Madhok
- Prachee Shah Pandya as Tabassum Ali Mohammed, Murad's sister-in-law
- Eshita Singh as Aayat Ali Mohammed, Murad's niece
- Ashrut Jain as Rashid
- Indraneil Sengupta as Aftab Ali Mohammed, Murad's son
- Sumit Kaul as Riyaz
- Ratnakar Upadhayay as Nayan Tejwani
- Abdul Quadir Amin as Riyaz
- Mahesh Chandra Deva as ATS Officer Bhadhohi
- Varun Tamta as SP Somnath Mishra

== Production ==
=== Development ===
A newspaper report read by Anubhav Sinha became the point of origin of Mulk and prompted him to develop an idea which he shared with his friends for their feedback. After receiving a positive response from his friends he began scripting the film. After writing 13-14 drafts of the film, Anubhav began narrating the story to his friends in the film industry, one of them being director Shoojit Sircar. Shoojit found the story to be one of the best-written works of Anubhav and requested him to not reconsider this project and instead go ahead with it.

The actors were given a preparation time of three months to get familiar with the roles they were playing. Prateik Babbar, who was to play the role of a Muslim terrorist was asked to watch the documentary Among the Believers and read extensively about David Headley, who is an American terrorist of Pakistani origin. For an appropriate portrayal of courtroom proceedings, Tapsee Pannu and Ashutosh Rana who play defence lawyer and public prosecutor respectively in the film were provided guidance by retired High Court Judge Nadeem Siddiqi from Lucknow for their courtroom sequences. A religious Muslim scholar from Malihabad was called in to supervise the Muslim rituals involving Rishi Kapoor in the film. Mulk was made at a production budget of ₹180 million (equivalent to ₹260 million or US$2.8 million in 2026). Jashoda Madhavji supervised the film's public relations.

=== Casting ===
In July 2017, it was reported that Rishi Kapoor, Taapsee Pannu and Prateik Babbar had been signed by Anubhav Sinha for his next film called Mulk. In September 2017, Neena Gupta was cast as the wife of Murad Ali. In August 2017, Neena Gupta had put up a post on her Instagram account saying that she was looking for good quality work, and as a response to that post director Anubhav Sinha got in touch with her and offered her a role in his film Mulk. Twelve actors from the Lucknow theatre industry were signed on to do various roles in the film. Eshita Singh, daughter of AAP leader Sanjay Singh and a member of Asmita Theatre Group, was added to the cast, but was credited as Vartika Singh. On 26 September 2017, it was reported that actor Ashutosh Rana would be working with Anubhav Sinha in his next film Mulk, 25 years after Shikast which was the last time the two of them worked together. Initially, Rajat Kapoor was supposed to play the role of Rishi Kapoor's brother and actor Manoj Pahwa was assigned the role of Police Officer Danish Javed but after the arrival of the two actors on set, Anubhav realized that both actors should be playing different roles and not the ones assigned to them, and as a result of that Rajat and Manoj swapped each other's roles.

=== Filming ===
Principal photography of the film began in October 2017 in Lucknow and continued for the next 27 days. According to the director Anubhav Sinha, Lucknow has been shown as Varanasi in the film while some part of the movie was also shot in Varanasi for two days. The filming process was completed on 9 November 2017.

== Soundtrack ==
Mulk

Soundtrack album by Prasad Sashte and Anurag Saikia
- Released: 9 July 2018
- Recorded: 2017–2018
- Genre: Feature film soundtrack
- Length: 14:58
- Language: Hindi
- Label: Zee Music Company
- Official Audio Jukebox on YouTube
Anurag Saikia chronology
Karwaan (2018)	Mulk (2018)	Article 15 (2019)

The background score of the film is composed by Mangesh Dhakde and songs are composed by Prasad Sashte and Anurag Saikia. The lyrics are written by Shakeel Azmi.

Track listing
No.	Title	Music	Singer(s)	Length
1.	"Thenge Se"	Prasad Sashte	Sunidhi Chauhan, Swanand Kirkire, Suvarna Tiwari	3:47
2.	"Khudara"	Prasad Sashte	Vishal Dadlani	5:11
3.	"Piya Samaye"	Anurag Saikia	Shafqat Amanat Ali, Arshad Hussain	6:00
Total length:				14:58

== Release ==
The movie was released on 3 August 2018 in 800 cinemas in India. The teaser of the film was out on 28 June, and official trailer was released on 9 July.

== Controversy ==
After banning the trailer of the movie in Pakistan, the Central Board of Film Censors, Pakistan banned the movie as well on 3 August 2018. Reacting to the decision, director Anubhav Sinha wrote a letter to the citizens of Pakistan.

However, Danyal Gilani, the Chairman of the Central Board of Film Censors, Pakistan said, "Members of the CBFC unanimously decided not to approve the trailer of Mulk as its contents flout the Censorship of Film Code, 1980, but the movie hasn't been banned as the film is yet to be submitted to the board for review," as reported by The Express Tribune, Pakistan.

== Critical reception ==
=== India ===
Mulk received highly positive response from critics in India. Taran Adarsh, movie critic and business analyst from Bollywood Hungama, wrote the following on Twitter about the movie, "#Mulk stands on powerful writing + splendid performances... Rishi Kapoor is in terrific form... Taapsee is fantastic... Supporting cast adds strength... Manoj Pahwa, Ashutosh Rana, Rajat Kapoor, Kumud Mishra, Prateik Babbar and Prachee Shah Paandya, each actor excels." Shekhar Gupta praised the film stating that Mulk breaks that mould and has ordinary Indian Muslims look you in the eye, as 1 out of 7 of Indians is a Muslim.

The Indian Express while giving 3.5 out of 5 carried the following line, "Any film that does not demonize, that talks of peace and brotherhood, in these dark, cynical times, is to be lauded. Mulk is Anubhav Sinha's best film, and it concerns us all." In similar views, Firstpost also rates the movie 3.5 out of 5 and states, "More than a film, Anubhav Sinha's Mulk is a voice. It is the voice of a section of Indian society working tirelessly to get rid of the prejudice around a certain community in the contemporary world."

On the other hand, The Times of India gave the film 4 out of 5 and opined, "Mulk focusses on some hard-hitting and burning issues, while also highlighting the crucial role that the media and various other channels of information play in disseminating the right news and facts to its citizens. It also brings to fore the other horrifying faces of terrorism which often gets brushed under the carpet. Mulk is a film that's relevant, brave and is a must-watch. It has thought-provoking message which drives home the point – that being a true Indian and real patriot is about embracing people from every faith with an open heart." Additionally, NDTV also gave the film 4 out of 5 and commented, "Go watch Mulk for its stout-hearted espousal of sanity. It isn't often that Bollywood shows such spine." Similarly, the critics at Filmfare rated the movie 4 out of 5 and writes, "The film makes you see these dark truths and you can't help but nod."

Meanwhile, News18 gave the film 3 out of 5 and the article in its closing lines read, "Finally, Mulk isn't original cinema, it's not even its own film, but it's a much needed reminder and lesson that we live in a secular nation, something that we always strive for."

=== Overseas ===
Khaleej Times, a daily English language newspaper published in United Arab Emirates, rates the film 3 out of 5 and states, "'Mulk' dares to tell a story not many filmmakers might want to associate themselves with. The one who emerges as a hero is the script, strong performances, and Anubhav Sinha's conviction to tell us the story. 'Mulk' is a fearless, courageous film and deserves to be watched."

== Awards and nominations ==
Award	Date of ceremony	Category	Recipient(s) and nominee(s)	Result	Ref.
Screen Awards	16 December 2018	Best Film (Critics)	Mulk	Won	
Screen Awards	16 December 2018	Best Actress (Critics)	Taapsee Pannu	Nominated	
Zee Cine Awards	19 March 2019	Best Actress (Viewers Choice)	Taapsee Pannu	Nominated	
Filmfare Awards	23 March 2019	Best Actress (Critics)	Taapsee Pannu	Nominated	
Filmfare Awards	23 March 2019	Best Supporting Actor	Manoj Pahwa	Nominated	
Filmfare Awards	23 March 2019	Best Story	Anubhav Sinha	Won	
Filmfare Awards	23 March 2019	Best Screenplay	Anubhav Sinha	Nominated	
Filmfare Awards	23 March 2019	Best Dialogue	Anubhav Sinha	Nominated	
Filmfare Awards	23 March 2019	Best Editing	Ballu Saluja	Nominated	
News18 Reel Movie Awards	26 March 2019	Best Supporting Actor	Manoj Pahwa	Won	
News18 Reel Movie Awards	26 March 2019	Best Supporting Actress	Taapsee Pannu	Nominated	
News18 Reel Movie Awards	26 March 2019	Best Dialogue	Anubhav Sinha	Won	
