= Nishaanchi Part 2 (soundtrack) =

2025 soundtrack album

Soundtrack album by Anurag Saikia, Manan Bhardwaj, Aaishvary Thackeray, Deepak Thakur, Parimal Shais and Kalmi
- Released: 14 November 2025
- Genre: Feature film soundtrack
- Length: 26:29
- Language: Hindi
- Label: Zee Music Company

Nishaanchi Part 2 is the soundtrack album to the 2025 Hindi-language crime drama film of the same name directed by Anurag Kashyap, which is the direct sequel to Nishaanchi. The film stars Aaishvary Thackeray in dual roles, alongside Vedika Pinto, Monika Panwar, Kumud Mishra and Mohammed Zeeshan Ayyub, all of them reprising their roles from the predecessor. The soundtrack album featured nine tracks composed by Anurag Saikia, Manan Bhardwaj, Deepak Thakur, Parimal Shais, Kalmi and Aaishvary himself, while lyrics were written by Shashwat Dwivedi, Dr. Sagar, Raaj Babu, Bhardwaj and Thakur. The soundtrack was released under the Zee Music Company label on 14 November 2025, coinciding with the release through Amazon Prime Video.

== Background ==
Unlike its predecessor, which had fifteen songs, the soundtrack to its sequel featured nine songs. Anurag Saikia had contributed three songs, while Manan Bhardwaj had contributed four songs in the album. Likewise, Aaishvary had composed the "End Theme" for this album, whereas Bhojpuri singer Deepak Thakur performed the track "Bidhana" with Parimal Shais and Kalmi. While the first film's soundtrack had varied with a multitude of genres and sound, the composers decided to lean in with a more disciplined sound to focus on the revenge-based narrative.The song "Neend Bhi Teri" was also featured in this film, albeit both composers, singers and lyricists being changed. The song's initial version was earlier credited under Aaishvary's vocals which Bhardwaj had liked. Later Saikia had conducted new arrangements and orchestrations with newer lyrics written by Sagar. He had also composed "Rendezvous Raja" reuniting with Madhubanti Bagchi, whom had previously sung the title track "Filam Dekho" for Nishaanchi.

== Release ==
Nishaanchi Part 2's soundtrack was released on 14 November 2025 through Zee Music Company. The soundtrack was released directly without any singles being released prior owing to the film's sudden premiere on Amazon Prime Video.

== Track listing ==
No.	Title	Lyrics	Music	Singer(s)	Length
1.	"Rendezvous Raja"	Shashwat Dwivedi	Anurag Saikia	Madhubanti Bagchi, Anurag Saikia	2:55
2.	"Neend Bhi Teri"	Dr. Sagar	Anurag Saikia	Anurag Saikia	2:46
3.	"Zeher Thookti Rehti Hun"	Manan Bhardwaj	Manan Bhardwaj	Manan Bhardwaj	2:47
4.	"Wonderland"	Manan Bhardwaj	Manan Bhardwaj	Manan Bhardwaj, Prajakta Shukre	2:51
5.	"Aisa Thag Ke Gaya"	Manan Bhardwaj	Manan Bhardwaj	Manan Bhardwaj	2:30
6.	"Sadhe Saati"	Manan Bhardwaj	Manan Bhardwaj	Manan Bhardwaj	2:39
7.	"Khoonkhar Nishaanchi"	Shashwat Dwivedi, Raaj Babu	Anurag Saikia	Raaj Babu, Anurag Saikia	2:21
8.	"Bidhana"	Deepak Thakur	Deepak Thakur, Parimal Shais, Kalmi	Deepak Thakur, Parimal Shais, Kalmi	3:54
9.	"End Theme"	—	Aaishvary Thackeray	—	3:43
Total length:					26:29

== Reception ==
Rishabh Suri of Hindustan Times wrote "The music complements the plot, although it raises one question: did we really need a song to underscore every major beat? Maybe not, but in the larger flow of things, it settles in." Sakshi Salil Chavan of Outlook wrote "The music in Part 2 underlines every narrative beat with near-ritualistic predictability and isn't as memorable as it was in its predecessor." Shilajit Mitra of The Hollywood Reporter India was however critical of the music, adding "There is a song that pairs s'il vous plaît with sil-batta and includes, just for kicks, nods to Eiffel Tower and Notre Dame. The French will never forgive." Bollywood Hungama wrote "The background score is also aptly dramatic, elevating the moments and helping us enjoy them optimally. Special mention to the songs that grabbed the attention unexpectedly and instantly."
