= Nishaanchi (soundtrack) =

2025 soundtrack album

Soundtrack album by Anurag Saikia, Manan Bhardwaj, Aaishvary Thackeray, Dhruv Ghanekar and Nishikar Chhibber
- Released: 5 September 2025
- Genre: Feature film soundtrack
- Length: 50:48
- Language: Hindi
- Label: Zee Music Company

Singles from Nishaanchi
- 1. "Dear Country" Released: 13 August 2025; 2. "Neend Bhi Teri" Released: 22 August 2025

Nishaanchi is the soundtrack album to the 2025 Hindi-language crime drama film of the same name directed by Anurag Kashyap starring debutant Aaishvary Thackeray in dual roles, alongside Vedika Pinto, Monika Panwar, Kumud Mishra, Mohammed Zeeshan Ayyub and Vineet Kumar Singh. The soundtrack featured fifteen songs composed by Anurag Saikia, Manan Bhardwaj, Dhruv Ghanekar and Nishikar Chhibber, with lyrics written by Shashwat Dwivedi, Varun Grover, Renu Chibber, Pyarelal Yadav, Dr. Sagar and Bhardwaj. Besides acting, Aaishvary also composed and wrote lyrics for one song. The soundtrack was released through Zee Music Company label on 5 September 2025.

== Background ==
Nishaanchi's soundtrack featured 15 songs composed by Dhruv Ghanekar, Anurag Saikia, Manan Bhardwaj, Aaishvary Thackeray and Nishikar Chhibber; Bhardwaj and Ghanekar had contributed most of the tracks in the album, while Saikia had composed two tracks, and Chhibber and Aaishvary had composed one track each. The soundtrack fuses experimentation of Bhojpuri, Hindi and English lyrics, while also had fused electronic and folk instrumentations. The songs help in shaping an authentic tone for the story rather than commercial purposes and each song were set to the mood of the film. Since Kashyap liked few of the songs, he wrote and designed certain sequences to fit the songs.

== Composition ==
Dhruv Ghanekar was involved in the project even before other composers were joined. Ghanekar said that Kashyap ensured the music to feel unpredictable and carry the same intensity and grit as the characters, thereby being an integral part in the story over being a background. This was evident in the song "Dear Country" which had set the tone for the film, sung by Vijay Lal Yadav and written by Pyarelal Yadav. Ghanekar recorded three songs in Varanasi and two at his home studio in Mumbai. For the musical soundscape, Ghanekar experimented with Afrobeats and pure folk from Uttar Pradesh as the music accompanied different flavors like "satire, pathos and street energy" being raw and unfiltered. The song "Kanupriya Kantaap" was performed by his daughters' Alaaya and Amaala. The song "Raja Hindustani" performed by Upendra Yadav, is a reference of old-school Bollywood melodrama and gangster cinema and the lyrics mixed of yesteryear film titles with folk music from Uttar Pradesh and Afro grooves, which was like "putting two people from different planets in the same room and watching them dance."

Manan Bhardwaj was initially involved for composing only one song in the film, while Kashyap described about the song situation through Zoom call. But he ended up composing around nine songs for the film. Initially, Kashyap called him to make the traditional song "Jhule Jhule Paalna", but instead he composed "Neend Bhi Teri" which Kashyap liked it. Bhardwaj recalled on Kashyap's advice to make music for himself and had provided full freedom on designing the soundtrack. He had written and sung most of the songs in Bhojpuri for the first time. Bhardwaj earlier recorded his version of "Neend Bhi Teri" while Aaishvary had recorded another version which was used in the film. While composing "Bhaga Bhaga Ke Maarenge", he had envisioned Sapna Choudhary in mind due to his Haryanvi origin and Vedika Pinto also took inspiration from the dancer. He had researched on the folk songs and the Haryanvi numbers, and realized on the term being used casually by the locals and has not been used in any other films. Because of his compositions, Kashyap increased the film's length by 15 minutes.

Saikia composed two tracks: the title track "Filam Dekho" sung by Madhubanti Bagchi, which was born out of "pure experimentation" in a jam session with lyricist Shashwat Dwivedi and Bagchi, since it felt true to the film it became the title track, considered it "an invitation for the audience to step into the magic of cinema". The other song "Birwa" sung by Arijit Singh and written by Dr. Sagar, was a complete opposite of the title track which was "grounded, soulful and incredibly close to [his] heart". Besides acting Aaishvary also wrote and composed the track "Pigeon Kabootar" sung by Bhupesh Singh. Though Aaishvary was musically inclined, and had composed rock and international songs, he had adapted to compose a track that was organic and rooted in style which made the song special. Nishikar Chhibber also composed one song "Ee Manwaa" written by Renu Chhibber and performed by Shreya Sundararaman, Sukanya Das, Devender Kumar.

== Release ==
The first song "Dear Country" was released on 13 August 2025. The second song "Neend Bhi Teri" was released on 22 August. The 15-song soundtrack was released through Zee Music Company on 5 September.

== Track listing ==
No.	Title	Lyrics	Music	Singer(s)	Length
1.	"Filam Dekho"	Shashwat Dwivedi	Anurag Saikia	Madhubanti Bagchi	3:20
2.	"Neend Bhi Teri"	Manan Bhardwaj	Manan Bhardwaj	Manan Bhardwaj	2:43
3.	"Jhule Jhule Paalna"	Traditional	Manan Bhardwaj	Manan Bhardwaj, Prajakta Shukre, Himani Kapoor	2:26
4.	"Birwa"	Dr. Sagar	Anurag Saikia	Arijit Singh	4:07
5.	"Pigeon Kabootar"	Aaishvary Thackeray	Aaishvary Thackeray	Bhupesh Singh	2:30
6.	"Bhaga Bhaga Ke Maarenge"	Manan Bhardwaj	Manan Bhardwaj	Manan Bhardwaj	2:42
7.	"Upar Wale Ne"	Pyarelal Yadav	Dhruv Ghanekar	Rahul Yadav	4:02
8.	"Dear Country"	Pyarelal Yadav	Dhruv Ghanekar	Vijay Lal Yadav	4:19
9.	"Reh Gaye Akele"	Manan Bhardwaj	Manan Bhardwaj	Manan Bhardwaj	3:15
10.	"Neend Bhi Teri" (Film Version)	Manan Bhardwaj	Manan Bhardwaj	Aaishvary Thackeray	2:43
11.	"Kanpuriya Kantaap"	Varun Grover	Dhruv Ghanekar	Alaaya Ghanekar, Amaala Ghanekar	2:56
12.	"Raja Hindustani"	Pyarelal Yadav	Dhruv Ghanekar	Upendra Yadav	4:50
13.	"Ee Manwaa"	Renu Chhibber	Nishikar Chhibber	Shreya Sundararaman, Sukanya Das, Devender Kumar	4:50
14.	"Soja"	Manan Bhardwaj	Manan Bhardwaj	Vandana Sinha, Prajakta Shukre	2:57
15.	"Saram Lagela"	Traditional	Dhruv Ghanekar	Kalpana Patowary	3:08
Total length:					50:48

== Reception ==
Swaroop Kodur of The Federal considered the multi-composer album being instrumental in Kashyap's storytelling adding that though it "becomes impossible to remember the lavish array of songs in Nishaanchi, [the] film throbs, screams and lunges on the back of a soundtrack that is as unyielding as the filmmaker’s best." Yatamanyu Narain of News18 wrote "Packed with 15 original songs, the soundtrack moves effortlessly between high-energy anthems and soul-stirring ballads, capturing the essence of love, rebellion, heartbreak, and resilience — promising a song for every mood." A review from Bollywood Hungama considered the music to be "peppy and varied". The review added the opening song "Filam Dekho" setting the mood of the film, while "Neend Bhi Teri" and "Kya Hai Kya Hai" being "soulful" and "Jhule Jhule Paalna" being well incorporated into the film, whereas the rest of the songs "Pigeon Kabootar", "Kanupriya Kantaap" and "Raja HindustanI" being "in sync with the film's mood". It also considered "Bhaga Bhaga Ke Maarenge" and "Upar Wale Ne" being energetic and poignant, but however felt "Dear Country" losing its novelty value despite being amusing, and "Saram Lagela" being forced into the narrative.

Sakshi Verma of India TV News considered the music to be its "highlight" adding that "the film album that opens for bangers like Filam Dekho has a variety of songs ranging from the mood of the film like Neend Bhi Teri, Birwa, Dear Country and Reh Gaye Akele". Saibal Chatterjee of NDTV described the album as "a quirky, jaunty medley of songs serving as conduits for shifts in mood, emotion and tonal emphasis". Kartik Bhardwaj of Cinema Express wrote "The music by Anurag Saikia, Manan Bhardwaj, Aaishvary Thackeray and Dhruv Ghanekar blends itself well with the eastern UP flavour", adding that he had enjoyed "Filam Dekho", "Pigeon Kabootar" and "Kanupriya Kantaap".

However, Rahul Desai of The Hollywood Reporter India considered the soundtrack to be lesser simulation of Sneha Khanwalkar's music for the Gangs of Wasseypur franchise and felt "he songs are not memorable, they strive to replicate a time when such songs used to be memorable" and further exist as "padding meant to offset the derivations of the premise". Mayur Sanap of Rediff.com considered the music to be a disappointment, where "it tries to infuse the same local flavour as Sneha Khanwalkar's inventive score in Wasseypur, but barring the opening credit song Filam Dekho, the zing is largely missing."
