= Symbiosis Institute of Business Management, Pune =

Higher education institute in India

Coordinates: 18°32′18″N 73°43′54″E

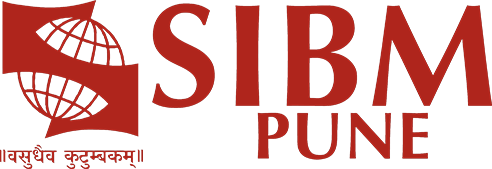
- Motto: वसुधैव कुटुम्बकम्
- Motto in English: The whole world is a family
- Type: Private business school
- Established: 1978; 48 years ago
- Affiliations: UGC, SIU
- Chancellor: Dr. Vidya Yeravdekar
- Director: Prof. (Dr.) Shrirang Altekar
- Location: Pune, Maharashtra, India
- Website: sibm.edu

Symbiosis Institute of Business Management, Pune (SIBM Pune) is a higher-education institute in Pune, India, part of Symbiosis International University. Established in 1978, the institute offers master's degree programmes in management, innovation and entrepreneurship and a number of executive training programmes.

== History ==
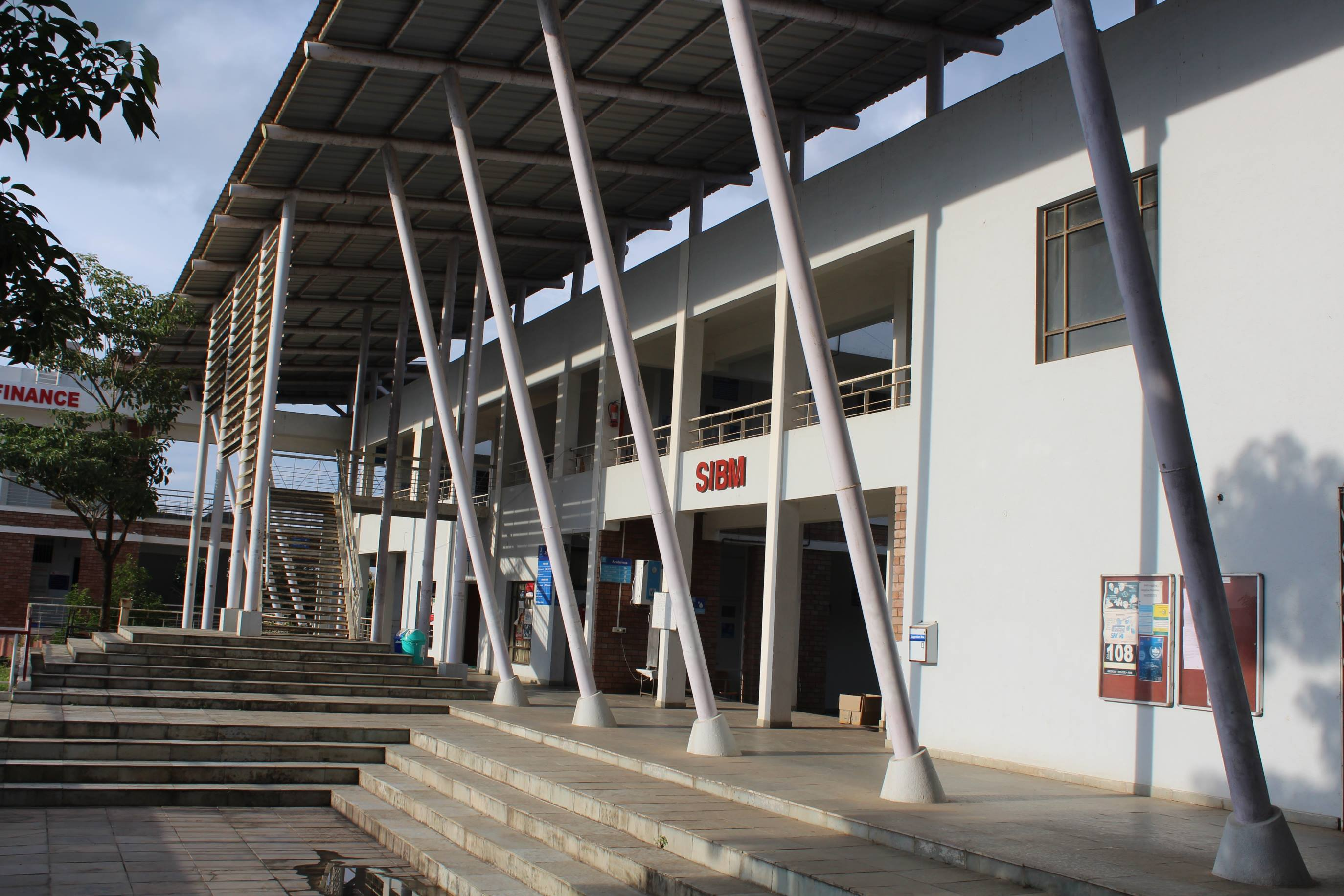
SIBM Pune Academic Building at Lavale Campus

The Symbiosis Society is registered under the Societies Registration Act, 1860 and the Bombay Public Trust Act, 1950. The first institutions belonging to the Symbiosis Society were established in 1971 by S. B. Mujumdar, and were affiliated with the University of Pune. Mujumdar subsequently established SIBM Pune in 1978.

Originally located as part of the combined campus of Symbiosis institutes in Pune city, the institute shifted to a new residential campus at Lavale in Mulshi Taluka at the outskirts of Pune city in 2008.

Programmes offered by SIBM Pune

- A two years full time M.B.A. programme with options to specialize in Marketing, Finance, Operations and Supply Chain Management, and Data Analytics .
- A two year full time M.B.A. programme in Human Resource Management – Integrated AI Analytics.
- A two year full time M.B.A. programme in Innovation and Entrepreneurship.
- M.B.A. (Executive) programme for working professional offered during weekends.
- Management Development Programmes for corporates as per the requirements of the corporate houses.

== Institute Rankings ==
SIBM Pune Rankings
Body/ Magazine	Ranking	Year
NIRF	20th Best B school in India	2021
Business Today	15th Best B school in India and Best B School in Pune	2021
Unstop (formerly Dare2Compete)	6th most competitive B school in the country	2020
The Week	11th Best B School in India	2019
The Week	4th Best Private B School in India	2019
Unstop (formerly Dare2Compete)	3rd most competitive B school in the country	2019
Outlook - ICARE	5th among the top 50 B-schools in the west zone	2019
Outlook - ICARE	6th among the top 150 private MBA institutes	2019
Outlook - ICARE	2nd among the top University-Constituent Colleges in India	2019
Dalal Street Investment Journal	7th in the category of Top-100 B-Schools in India	2019
NIRF	20th Best B School in India	2019

== Notable alumni ==
- Mr. Melwyn Rego (Head - International Banking IDBI Bank)
- Mr. Aashim Malhotra (Vice President Danone)
- Mr. Lokesh Nigam (Chief Executive Officer Konverz AI)
- Mr. Alok Chitre (Chief Business Officer Rajasthan Royals)
- Neeraj Ghaywan (Film Director)
- Babu Antony (Actor)
- Radhika Maira Tabrez (Indian Writer)
- Divya Prakash Dubey (Hindi Writer)
