= Maira =

Maira may refer to:

== People ==
- Arun Maira (born 1943), Indian politician
- Maira Alexandra Rodríguez (born 1991), Venezuelan model
- Maira Bes-Rastrollo, Spanish academic
- Maira Bravo Behrendt (born 1991), Brazilian rugby sevens player
- Maira Doshi, Indian actress
- Maira Kalman (born 1949), Israeli-born American artist
- Maira Khan, Pakistani actress
- Maira Mariela Macdonal Alvarez, Bolivian diplomat
- Maira Shamsutdinova, Soviet/Kazakh singer and composer
- Maíra Charken (born 1978), Dutch Brazilian actress
- Maíra Vieira, Brazilian model
- Radhika Maira Tabrez, Indian writer

== Places ==
- Maira (river), Italy
- Maira Valley, Italy
- Maira, the Lombard name for the river Mera (Lake Como), in Switzerland and Italy

== Other ==
- Maira (fly)
- Maira, a fictional character in the Indian animated show Rudra: Boom Chik Chik Boom
- Maira Tsukishima, a character in the anime show Mewkledreamy
