= P.M. Manoj =

The Honourable Justice P.M. Manoj

Judge of the Kerala High Court
- Incumbent
- Assumed office 22 March 2024
- Nominated by: D. Y. Chandrachud
- Appointed by: Droupadi Murmu

Personal details
- Born: 4 May 1972 (age 54) Kerala
- Education: Sree Kerala Varma College; Symbiosis Law School; CUSAT
- Website: High Court of Kerala

Manoj Pulamby Madhavan is an Indian judge who is presently serving as a judge of Kerala High Court. The High Court of Kerala is the highest court in the Indian state of Kerala and in the Union Territory of Lakshadweep. The High Court of Kerala is headquartered at Ernakulam, Kochi. Manoj was elevated as judge from the bar while he was practicing as a lawyer in Kerala High Court.

== Early life and education ==
Manoj graduated from Sree Kerala Varma College, obtained Law Degree from Symbiosis Law School and masters in Law from CUSAT.

== Career ==
Manoj enrolled as an advocate in Bar Council of Kerala in 1999 and started practice. Served as Government Pleader in Kerala High Court. On 22 March 2024, he was appointed as an additional judge of Kerala High Court and became permanent judge with effect from 4 March 2026.
