= Shashikala Gurpur =

Indian author and professor (born 1964)

- Born: 11 December 1964 (age 61); Mangalore, India
- Education: Mangalore University
- Occupations: Professor, author, researcher
- Title: Director of Symbiosis Law School & Dean of the Faculty of Law, Symbiosis International University
- Awards: Kittur Rani Chennamma Award, 2019; SILF's Legal Education Innovation Award, 2011
- Website: drshashikalagurpur.com

Shashikala Gurpur (born 11 December 1964) is an Indian author and professor, who is the director of Symbiosis Law School, Pune and Dean of the Faculty of Law, Symbiosis International University. She is a member of 19th Law Commission of India and National Academic Council. She is the recipient of a Fulbright Fellowship. She is named in the list of Top 100 Legal Luminaries of India by LexisNexis in May 2016. She was awarded Kittur Rani Chennamma Award by the Government of Karnataka in March 2019.

== Education ==
Gurpur completed her graduation in law from Mangalore University in 1988. She has done a PhD in international law from Mysore University where she was also a gold medalist in Master of Laws. She hails from Golidadiguthu family of Gurupur in Mangalore, Karnataka. She is an alumnus of St. Agnes College and SDM Law College.

== Career ==
Shashikala Gurpur is the Dean of the Faculty of Law, Symbiosis International (Deemed University) and director of Symbiosis Law School. She has been a professor and her teaching experience includes tenures in National Law School of India University, SDM Law College, Manipal Institute of Communication and University College Cork, Ireland. Her research interests include Jurisprudence, Media Laws, International Law and Human Rights, Research Methodology, Feminist Legal Studies, Biotechnology Law, Law and Social Transformation. She has co-authored two books and published 60 research papers.

In 1991, Gurpur guided national award-winning project on Community-based law reforms for National Law School of India and also acted as Advisor to research project and publication of Asian Network of Women in Communication (ANWIC), which was sponsored by WACC, UK from 1999 to 2004. In 2001, she received the NPS Sector research grant under Ford Foundation on Gender Advocacy and European Commission law link grant in 1998.

Dr Gurpur has recently been nominated as advisory board member of Pune based consumer technology firm udChalo

== Bibliography ==
- Impact of Genetic Engineering on Agriculture: Biodiversity Conservation and Farmers' Rights in India. Lap Lambert Academic Publishing. 2013. ISBN 9783659445682.
- Women Friendly Pune. Janwani.

== Honours ==
- She is the recipient of a Fulbright Fellowship and AHRB Fellow, Edinburgh Law School (2004).
- The Government of Karnataka conferred the Kittur Rani Chennamma Award, 2018–19 for her contribution toward women empowerment and education.
- In 2014, Gurpur was awarded a certificate of recognition, 'My Choice for Equality' by the Global Ethics Forum, Geneva in association with IIM Bangalore.
- In November 2013, she was awarded the 'Award for Excellence in Legal Sector' by The Vijay Foundation.
- She received the Legal Education Innovation Award by Society of Indian Law Firms (SILF) and the Menon Institute of Legal Advocacy Training (NLRC) in 2011.
