= Ishq (2019 film) =

2019 Malayalam film by Anuraj Manohar

- Theatrical release poster
- Directed by: Anuraj Manohar
- Written by: Ratheesh Ravi
- Produced by: Mukesh R Mehta; A.V. Anoop; C.V. Sarathi
- Starring: Ann Sheetal; Shane Nigam; Shine Tom Chacko; Leona Lishoy
- Cinematography: Ansar Shah
- Edited by: Kiran Das
- Music by: Jakes Bejoy
- Production companies: AVA Productions; E4 Entertainment
- Release date: 17 May 2019 (Kerala)
- Running time: 134 minutes
- Country: India
- Language: Malayalam

Ishq is a 2019 Indian Malayalam language romantic thriller film written by Ratheesh Ravi and directed by Anuraj Manohar (in his directorial debut). It stars actors Shane Nigam and Ann Sheetal and features Shine Tom Chacko and Leona Lishoy. The film is produced by Mukesh R Mehta, A.V. Anoop and C.V. Sarathi for AVA Productions.

== Plot ==
The film revolves around the life of a man from Kochi, named Sachi and his girlfriend, Vasudha.

Sachi works at an information technology firm and takes time off from work to attend his sister's wedding. While on leave, he and his girlfriend Vasudha go on a date for her birthday where they encounter Alwin, sitting in a car with Mukundan. Alwin and Mukundan convince Sachi that they are police officers and that he and Vasudha will be arrested if they don't take them along.

Sachi and Vasudha are mentally tortured while driving around with Alwin and Mukundan. Alwin tries to make a move on Vasudha while Sachi is away. Tired of Alwin's actions, Mukundan leaves the three of them alone. Alwin continues to harass them but leaves after Sachi pays him off. The two then go to Vasudha's hostel without speaking. A frustrated Sachi asks Vasudha what Alwin has done to her. Upset by his question and the fact that he didn't ask her if she was okay, she insults him and gets out of the car and Sachi angrily drives back home.

While Sachi is restless at home, he decides to take revenge. He goes back to the place where he originally met Alwin and discovers that Alwin is just an ambulance driver and Mukundan is a tailor. Sachi finds Alwin's address and goes to his house while he is away. He is greeted by Alwin's wife, Maria, and his daughter, Mia (Lakshmi Nanda Kishore). He enters the house and makes a scene. When Alwin arrives home, he and Sachi get into a fight, with Sachi breaking Alwin's legs. Sachi attempts to leave but is stopped by a procession on the road. Sachi begins to torture Alwin's wife and daughter in the same way Alwin tortured him and his girlfriend.

Alwin's friends arrive outside his house. He attempts to shout to them for help but stops when Sachi threatens to kill his daughter. Meanwhile, Maria overhears Alwin's friends talking about Sachi's incident. As his friends leave, Maria angrily questions Alwin, who confesses that he tried to sexually assault Vasudha, but she fought back. Sachi apologises to Maria and leaves the broken family alone. Maria takes her daughter inside, while Alwin lies in the room immobilized. A happy and relaxed Sachi meets Vasudha that night.

The next day, Vasudha joins Sachi at her college. Still angry at his question, she asks what else he wants to know. He pulls his car over and takes Mukundan out of the trunk. Mukundan apologizes and Sachi offers him money to get back home. Still angry, Vasudha asks Sachi if he would've abandoned her, had Alwin done something to her. Sachi refuses to reply and changes the topic by proposing to her for her birthday. She turns him down as she does not want to live with Sachi anymore. She realises Sachi might not have accepted her if she had been sexually assaulted, regardless of who was at fault or how miserable the situation was.

During the credits, multiple real-life instances of moral policing are shown.

== Cast ==
- Shane Nigam as Sachidhanandan (Sachi)
- Ann Sheetal as Vasudha
- Shine Tom Chacko as Alwin
- Leona Lishoy as Mariya
- Jaffar Idukki as Mukundan
- Parvathy T as Radhamma
- Swasika as Kunjechi
- Kainakary Thankaraj as Murugan
- Prem Nath as Biju
- Jithan V Soubhagom as Sali
- Emil George

== Soundtrack ==
Ishq

Soundtrack album by Jakes Bejoy
- Released: 11 May 2019
- Recorded: 2019
- Genre: Feature film soundtrack
- Length: 4:30
- Language: Malayalam
- Label: E4Entertainments

Jakes Bejoy chronology
Mera Naam Shaji (2019)	Ishq (2019)	Kakshi: Amminippilla (2019)

The film soundtrack was composed by Jakes Bejoy, with lyrics penned by Joe Paul. The songs were released on 11 May 2019 under E4 Entertainments.

Track list
No.	Title	Music	Singer(s)	Length
1.	"Parayuvaan"	Jakes Bejoy	Sid Sriram, Neha Nair	4:30
2.	"Thirinjum Marinjum"	Gowry Lekshmi		03:25
Total length:				4:30

== Awards ==
- Kerala State Film Award for Best Editor - Kiran Das

== Release ==
Ishq was released on 17 May 2019 in India.

== Critical reception ==
Deepika Jayaram of The Times of India rated the movie 3.5 out of 5 stars and wrote, "The film gives a glimpse into the kind of moral policing that many are constantly subjected to, on our streets. It also shows how such experiences get etched into the minds of those who have had to go through such ordeals." Jayaram also praised Shane Nigam and Ann Sheetal's acting.

Ashwin Baradwaj of Lensman rated the movie 4/5 and stated, "Ishq is a good example of how to make a message-oriented film. Apart from a small dialogue from Shane Nigam towards the end of the film, there is hardly any spoon-feeding here and what you get is an impactful cinema powered by solid performance and craft-filled making."

Litty Simon of Manorama Online rated the movie 3.5/5 stars and offered, "Without diverting from its serious note, Ishq wins heart for the subtle nuances through which it tried to differentiate between 'love' and 'passion'."

Akhila Menon of Filmibeat wrote, "Ishq is not just another love story but discusses a highly relevant social issue in a highly effective manner. Do watch it..!!" and rated it 3.5/5 stars.

Cris of The News Minute rated the movie 2/5 stars and said, "The movie begins promisingly enough, becomes a drag after a point and the issue of moral policing that it deals with is not handled well."

== Remake ==
The film was remade into Telugu with the same title starring Teja Sajja, Priya Prakash Varrier, Ravindra Vijay and Leona Lishoy (in her Telugu debut and reprising her role from the original film), in Hindi as Operation Romeo starring Sidhant Gupta, Vedika Pinto (in her debut film), Sharad Kelkar and Bhoomika Chawla, and in Tamil as Aasai starring Kathir, Divyabharathi, Linga and Shamna Kasim.
