= Divya Prakash Dubey =

Indian Hindi author

- Born: 8 May 1982 (age 44); Lucknow, India
- Education: College of Engineering Roorkee (B. Tech, Computer Science Engineering), Symbiosis Institute of Business Management, Pune (MBA)
- Occupation: Novelist
- Writing career
- Period: 2013 to present
- Genres: Fiction, Short Stories
- Notable works: Ibnebatuti, October Junction, Musafir Cafe, Masala Chai, Sharten Laagoo
- Website: www.divyaprakash.in

Divya Prakash Dubey (born 8 May 1982) is an Indian Hindi author. He has written six books: a couple of collection of stories in Hindi, Terms and Conditions Apply and Masala Chai, and four short novels which includes Musafir Cafe, October Junction, Ibnebatuti and Aako Baako. He is also Hindi dialogue writer for movie PS-1 & PS-2.

In 2026, his book Musafir Cafe got made into a Netflix original Hindi television series of the same name, where he also guest starred.

== Early life ==
Divya Prakash Dubey grew up in Hardoi, Shahjahanpur, Ghaziabad, Lucknow and Varanasi. After completing his degree in Computer Science Engineering from College of Engineering Roorkee, he pursued MBA from Symbiosis Institute of Business Management, Pune. He got placed in a top MNC and started writing stories alongside that got published later.

== List of works ==
=== Books ===
- इब्नेबतूती a Hindi Novel publishing in July 2020 by Hind Yugm Westland (first edition)
- Aako Baako / आको बाको published on 22 November 2021 by Hind Yugm (ISBN 9392820003)
- October Junction (ISBN 9387464407), a Hindi Novel publishing on 1 January 2019 by Hind Yugm Westland (first edition)
- Musafir Cafe (ISBN 9386224011), a Hindi Novel published on 14 September 2016 by Hind Yugm Westland (first edition)
- Masala Chai (ISBN 9381394369), a collection of short stories in Hindi published by Hind Yugm, New Delhi in 2014 (first edition)
- Terms & Conditions Apply (ISBN 9381394822), a collection of short stories in Hindi published by Hind Yugm, New Delhi in 2013 (first edition)
- यार पापा (Yaar Papa) (ISBN 978-9392820847), published by Hind Yugm, New Delhi in 2023
