= JAR Pictures =

Indian film production company

Jar Pictures
- Type: Private
- Industry: Motion picture
- Founded: 2011
- Founder: Ajay G. Rai; Alan McAlex
- Headquarters: Mumbai, India
- Products: Film production
- Website: www.jarpictures.com

JAR Pictures is an Indian motion picture production company based in Mumbai. The company was founded in 2011 by Bollywood producers Ajay G. Rai and Alan McAlex. Jar Pictures is mostly known for making independent films. Jar Pictures also provides production services to leading studios in India.

Jar Pictures' Liar's Dice was India's Official Entry for the Best Foreign Language Film for the 87th Academy Awards.

== History ==
Jar Pictures was formerly known as Jar Entertainment, a company wholly owned by Ajay G. Rai. Ajay met Alan McAlex while working on the film Thank you (2011) where Ajay was the Executive Producer and Alan was the line producer. They decided to collaborate and Jar Pictures was formed.

== Filmography ==
=== Films produced by Jar Pictures ===
| Year | Film | Director | Other notes |
|---|---|---|---|
| 2012 | Gangs of Wasseypur – Part 1 | Anurag Kashyap | Co-production with Viacom18 Motion Pictures, Tipping Point Films, AKFPL, Phantom Films, Elle Driver, and Bohra Bros |
| 2012 | Gangs of Wasseypur – Part 2 | Anurag Kashyap | Co-production with Viacom18 Motion Pictures, Tipping Point Films, AKFPL, Phantom Films, and Bohra Bros |
| 2012 | Luv Shuv Tey Chicken Khurana | Sameer Sharma | Co-production with UTV Spotboy and AKFPL |
| 2013 | I.D. | Kamal K.M. | Co-production with Collective Phase One |
| 2013 | Vakratunda Mahakaaya | Punarvasu Naik | |
| 2013 | Mastram | Akhilesh Jaiswal | Co-production with Bohra Bros |
| 2014 | Njan Steve Lopez | Rajeev Ravi | |
| 2014 | Liar's Dice | Geetu Mohandas | Co-production with Unplugged and Hubert Bals Fund, India's official entry to the 87th Academy Awards |
| 2015 | Killa | Avinash Arun | |
| 2015 | Nil Battey Sannata | Ashwiny Iyer Tiwari | Co-production with Eros International, Colour Yellow Productions, and Opticus Inc |
| 2017 | Gurgaon | Shanker Raman | Co-production with Hashtag Film Studios and M R Filmworks |
| 2017 | Qarib Qarib Singlle | Tanuja Chandra | Co-production with Zee Studios |
| 2018 | Once Again | Kanwal Sethi | |
| 2018 | Saheb, Biwi Aur Gangster 3 | Tigmanshu Dhulia | Co-production with Raju Chadha Films and Rahul Mittra Films |
| 2019 | Moothon | Geetu Mohandas | |
| 2019 | Hummingbird | Ajitpal Singh | |
| 2019 | River Song | Sange Dorjee Thongdok | |
| 2019 | Chaar Pandrah | Saif Baidya | Starring Gehna Seth as Sarika, [Puneet Mishra], Abhishek Singh |
| 2020 | Bamfaad | Ranjan Chandel | Distributed by ZEE5 |
| 2020 | London Confidential | Kanwal Sethi | Distributed by ZEE5 |
| 2020 | Choked | Anurag Kashyap | Co-production with Good Bad Films, distributed by Netflix |
| 2021 | Lahore Confidential | Kunal Kohli | Distributed by ZEE5 |
| 2023 | Sergeant | Prawaal Raman | Co-production with Jio Studios, distributed by JioCinema |
| 2025 | Nishaanchi | Anurag Kashyap | Co-production with Flip Films, distributed by Amazon MGM Studios |
| 2025 | Nishaanchi Part 2 | Anurag Kashyap | Co-production with Flip Films, distributed by Amazon MGM Studios |

=== Film Production Services by Jar Pictures ===
| Year | Film | Director | Studio | Other notes |
|---|---|---|---|---|
| 2009 | Gulaal | Anurag Kashyap | | |
| 2011 | No One Killed Jessica | Rajkumar Gupta | UTV SpotBoy | (Credited as Jar Entertainment) |
| 2011 | 7 Khoon Maaf | Vishal Bhardwaj | UTV SpotBoy; VB Pictures | (Credited as Jar Entertainment) |
| 2011 | Thank you | Anees Bazmee | UTV Motion Pictures | (Credited as Jar Entertainment) |
| 2011 | Chillar Party | Nitesh Tiwari; Vikas Bahl | UTV SpotBoy | (Credited as Jar Entertainment) |
| 2011 | Saheb, Biwi Aur Gangster | Tigmanshu Dhulia | | |
| 2013 | Kai Po Che! | Abhishek Kapoor | UTV Motion Pictures | |
| 2014 | Bhoothnath Returns | Nitesh Tiwari | B R Films | |
| 2015 | Talvar | Meghna Gulzar | Junglee Pictures | |
| 2015 | Fitoor | Abhishek Kapoor | UTV Motion Pictures | |
| 2016 | Rocky Handsome | Nishikant Kamat | T-Series | |
| 2016 | Madaari | Nishikant Kamat | Pooja Entertainment | |
| 2017 | Simran (film) | Hansal Mehta | T-Series | |
| 2017 | Mukkabaaz | Anurag Kashyap | Eros International | |
| 2018 | Mental Hai Kya | Prakash Kovelamudi | Balaji Motion Pictures | |

== OTT ==
| Year | Title | Creator(s) | Network | Other notes |
|---|---|---|---|---|
| 2021 | Grahan | Shailendra Kumar Jha | Hotstar | |
| 2022 | London Files | Sachin Pathak | Voot | |
| 2025 | Kanneda | Chandan Arora | Hotstar | |
| 2025 | Kankhajura | Chandan Arora | SonyLIV | |
| 2025 | Perfect Family | Palak Bhambri | YouTube | |
| 2026 | Waiting Hai | Sameer Vidwans | Amazon MX Player | |

== Awards ==
- 62nd National Film Awards: Best Feature Film in Marathi: Killa
