= Operation Romeo (film) =

2022 Indian film by Shashant Shah

- Theatrical release poster
- Directed by: Shashant Shah
- Written by: Ratheesh Ravi; Arshad Syed
- Based on: Ishq by Anuraj Manohar
- Produced by: Shital Bhatia; Neeraj Pandey
- Starring: Sidhant Gupta; Vedika Pinto; Bhumika Chawla; Sharad Kelkar
- Cinematography: Hari Nair
- Edited by: Praveen Kathikuloth
- Music by: M. M. Kreem
- Production companies: Friday Filmworks; Plan C Studios
- Distributed by: Reliance Entertainment
- Release date: 22 April 2022
- Running time: 135 minutes
- Country: India
- Language: Hindi

Operation Romeo is a 2022 Indian Hindi-language romantic thriller film directed by Shashant Shah, written by Arshad Sayed and produced by Shital Bhatia and Neeraj Pandey under the banner of Friday Filmworks and Plan C Studios. A remake of the 2019 Malayalam film Ishq, it stars Sidhant Gupta and Vedika Pinto. The supporting cast includes Sharad Kelkar, Bhumika Chawla and Kishor Kadam.

== Plot ==
Aditya "Adi" Sharma and Neha Kasliwal are a couple in a romantic relationship, though their parents are still unaware. Adi works for an IT company, while Neha is a college student. For Neha’s birthday, they plan a long night drive. Adi has bought her a ring as a birthday gift and also intends to propose to her during the night.

During the drive, Adi asks Neha for a kiss. Neha agrees but doesn’t want to do it in the middle of the road, so Adi parks the car in a dark street. As they’re about to kiss, a man (Sharad Kelkar) knocks on the window holding a phone, recording them. He introduces himself as Sub-Inspector Mangesh Jadhav and is accompanied by his junior officer, Patil (Kishor Kadam). They accuse Adi and Neha of public indecency and threaten to arrest them and inform their parents.

Terrified, as they both come from conservative families where romance before marriage is taboo, Adi and Neha plead with the men to let them go, but the "officers" insist on filing a case. Mangesh then begins verbally sexually harassing Neha, which traumatizes her and makes Adi extremely uncomfortable. Eventually, the two agree to let them go if Adi pays a bribe of ₹35,000. Adi agrees but doesn’t have that much cash, so they drive to a nearby ATM to withdraw money.

Mangesh insists on sitting next to Neha in the back seat and continues to harass her. When the first ATM is out of order, they head to another one. On the way, Adi, unable to tolerate Mangesh’s behavior anymore, pushes him to the ground. Enraged, Mangesh calls his station and threatens to have them arrested. Terrified, Adi falls to the ground, begging for forgiveness. Mangesh then agrees to revert to the original deal: ₹35,000 in exchange for their freedom.

At the next ATM, Adi withdraws the money. But when he returns to the car, he finds Mangesh has locked himself inside with Neha, apparently misbehaving with her. Furious, Adi drags Mangesh out. Mangesh denies doing anything wrong.

After taking the bribe, the two “officers” finally leave. Adi drops Neha off at her college and asks her what Mangesh did inside the car. Still shaken, Neha unintentionally wounds Adi’s ego by implying he hadn’t acted “man enough” during the incident. Hurt, Adi leaves without another word. Over following days, Neha tries to reach out to apologize, but Adi ignores her messages and calls.

Determined to prove his “manhood” to Neha, Adi returns to the scene of the incident and is shocked to discover that Mangesh and Patil are not real police officers. Mangesh is actually an ambulance driver, and Patil is a tailor. They had been impersonating officers to extort couples like Adi and Neha.

Adi then goes to Mangesh’s home while he’s away and harasses Mangesh’s wife Chhaya (Bhumika Chawla) and daughter in a manner similar to how Mangesh harassed Neha. When Mangesh arrives, a fight breaks out between the two. Adi beats him and threatens to harm his daughter unless Mangesh confesses what really happened that night. Under pressure, Mangesh admits everything in front of his family and apologizes to Adi. He says he tried to kiss Neha, but she slapped him and nothing further happened, as Adi had returned shortly after.

Adi then visits Neha at her college. He tells her everything he did to “prove his manhood.” Neha is happy to see him again and ready to reconcile. She begins to finally answer the question Adi had asked her earlier about what exactly happened in the car, but he dismisses it as insignificant since nothing transpired. Puzzled, she asks what his response would have been had something happened; he is stunned but proposes to her. Disappointed by his silence, Neha rejects the proposal.

== Cast ==
- Sidhant Gupta as Aditya Sharma
- Vedika Pinto as Neha Kasliwal
- Bhumika Chawla as Chhaya
- Sharad Kelkar as Mangesh Jadhav
- Kishor Kadam as Patil
- Neha Khan as Aditya's Sister

== Production ==
=== Development ===
A remake of the 2019 Malayalam film Ishq was announced in 2021.

== Soundtrack ==
The film's music was composed by M. M. Kreem while lyrics written by Manoj Muntashir. On 5 April 2022, the first song titled 'Abhi Abhi' sung by Neeti Mohan was unveiled. Six days later, the second song 'Tere Bin Jeena Kya' sung by Vishal Mishra and Rupali Jagga was released.

Operation Romeo

Soundtrack album by M. M. Keeravani
- Released: 2022
- Recorded: 2021
- Genre: film soundtrack
- Length: 12:17
- Label: Saregama

M. M. Keeravani chronology
RRR (2022)	Operation Romeo (2022)	Jayamma Panchayathi (2022)
External videos
- "Abhi Abhi" on YouTube
- "Tere Bin Jeena Kya" on YouTube
- "Yeh Kyun Kiya" on YouTube

Singles from Operation Romeo
- 1. "Abhi Abhi" Released: 6 April 2022; 2. "Tere Bin Jeena Kya" Released: 12 April 2022; 3. "Yeh Kyun Kiya" Released: 19 April 2022

Track list
No.	Title	Singer(s)	Length
1.	"Abhi Abhi"	Neeti Mohan	4:50
2.	"Tere Bin Jeena Kya"	Vishal Mishra, Rupali Jagga	4:27
3.	"Yeh Kyun Kiya"	Vishal Mishra	3:00

== Marketing ==
A motion poster of the film featuring the cast was released on 31 March 2022. The film was released on 22 April 2022.

== Release ==
=== Theatrical ===
The film was released in theatres on 22 April 2022.

== Reception ==
=== Critical reception ===
BH Harsh of Firstpost gave the film a rating of three and a half stars out of five and wrote "Its ability to charter the uncomfortable lanes is its biggest strength which lies in the themes of justice and morality". Rohit Bhatnagar of The Free Press Journal gave the film a rating of three and a half stars and wrote "New kids on the block, Sidhant and Vedika, are the film's highlight.Sharad Kelkar as a ruthless cop in disguise, delivers an earnest performance". Rachana Dubey of The Times of India gave it two and a half stars out of five and found that "a thriller-love story have been built well but the film eventually takes a completely different turn and it doesn't stitch well at the end." Deepa Gahlot of Rediff.com gave the film two and a half stars out of five and observed, "the film is scarily effective in a 'but for the grace of God's way'," but criticized the performances as disappointing "because it did have something significant to say and chickened out".
