= Ramakrishnan Raman =

Vice Chancellor

Ramakrishnan Raman is an Indian academic administrator, currently{from Oct 2023} serving as vice-chancellor of Symbiosis International University.

== Education ==
Raman earned his Doctor of Philosophy (Ph.D.) in Management from Pune University. He also holds a Master of Business Administration (MBA) in Systems and Marketing and an engineering degree in Computer Science and Engineering, both from the University of Madras, as well as a Master of Philosophy (M.Phil.) from Alagappa University.

== Career ==
Raman has held several administrative roles at Symbiosis International University, including dean of the Faculty of Management, director of the Symbiosis Centre for Information Technology, director of the Symbiosis Institute of Business Management in Pune, and director of Strategy and Development.

Raman has authored over 250 academic publications in areas such as information systems, IT strategy, entrepreneurship, artificial intelligence, and big data. Citation counts for Raman's research include Google Scholar listing over 26,000 citations, Scopus reporting over 8,000, and ResearchGate showing over 1,500.
