= Gumraah (2023 film) =

2023 Indian film by Vardhan Ketkar

- Threatical release poster
- Directed by: Vardhan Ketkar
- Written by: Aseem Arora; Vardhan Ketkar
- Story by: Magizh Thirumeni
- Based on: Thadam (2019) by Magizh Thirumeni
- Produced by: Bhushan Kumar; Krishan Kumar; Anjum Ketani
- Starring: Aditya Roy Kapur; Mrunal Thakur; Ronit Roy
- Cinematography: Vineet Malhotra
- Edited by: Sahil Nayar
- Music by: Score: Ketan Sodha; Songs: Mithoon; Vishal Mishra; Tanishk Bagchi; Abhijit Vaghani
- Production company: T-Series Films
- Distributed by: Pen Marudhar Entertainment
- Release date: 7 April 2023
- Running time: 127 minutes
- Country: India
- Language: Hindi
- Budget: est. ₹25 crore
- Box office: est. ₹10.68 crores

Gumraah (transl. Astray) is a 2023 Indian Hindi-language action thriller film directed by Vardhan Ketkar and produced by T-Series Films. The film stars Aditya Roy Kapur in a dual role along with Mrunal Thakur and Ronit Roy. It is a remake of the 2019 Tamil film Thadam. It revolves around a murder investigation which becomes complicated after the police discover two lookalike suspects.

Principal photography began in October 2021 on the occasion of Dussehra. The filming was wrapped up on 16 July 2022. The film was released in theatres on 7 April 2023. The film received mixed reviews, with extreme praise for the action sequences, and underperformed commercially, becoming a box-office bomb.

== Plot ==
The film begins with a murder investigation led by Shivani Mathur, after a man is found dead in his home. Initially treated as a burglary, the case takes a turn when a neighbour's selfie captures the suspect. ACP Dhiren Yadav identifies the man as Arjun Sehgal, a real estate developer, and orders his arrest. However, doubts arise when another man, Sooraj, is taken into custody for disorderly conduct - he looks identical to Arjun.

Three months prior, Arjun was focused on his real estate business and was engaged to Janhvi, a film critic. Meanwhile, Sooraj, a small-time conman, found himself in trouble after scamming a mob boss. The boss kidnapped his friend Chaddi and demanded ₹2 million as ransom. Desperate, Sooraj tried to gather the money but failed.

On the night of the murder, both Arjun and Sooraj are shown with similar injuries, further complicating the investigation. A DNA test reveals they are identical twins who were separated as children due to their parents' divorce. Yadav, who has a personal vendetta against Arjun, attempts to manipulate the case. Despite extensive questioning, neither twin provides a solid alibi.

Six months later, Shivani receives a missing person's case file for Janhvi. It is discovered that she had attended a school reunion before disappearing, and later, a message from her to Arjun states that she is marrying Akash. Further investigation reveals that Akash had drugged and assaulted Janhvi, leading to her death. He bribed officials to cover up the crime. Arjun, upon learning the truth, killed Akash. Sooraj, discovering what had happened, altered the crime scene to protect his brother.

With no conclusive evidence, the case remains unresolved. Arjun leaves Mumbai, unable to stay in a city that holds nothing for him after Janhvi's death, and leaves Sooraj the keys to his house.

== Cast ==
- Aditya Roy Kapur in a dual role as:
  - Arjun Sehgal
  - Sooraj Rana
- Mrunal Thakur as SI Shivani Mathur
- Ronit Roy as ACP Dhiren Yadav "Dhiru" IPS
- Vedika Pinto as Janhvi Behl
- Keeya Khanna as Ms. Rana, Arjun's and Sooraj's mother
- Mohit Anand as Prithvi
- Ivan Rodrigues as Advocate Bijou
- Deepak Kalra as Kulbhushan "Chaddi"
- Navneet Kaur as Radhika Yadav Valmiki, Dhiren's daughter
- Akshay Bhagat as Purushottam, the goon who filed a case on Chaddi
- Sachin Khurana as Ravi Sehgal, Arjun and Sooraj's father
- Micky Makhija as Judge (Final Verdict)
- Aditya Lal as Aakash Sardana, murder victim
- Tanvie Kishore as Aakash's sister
- Chahat Vig as Divya

== Production ==
=== Development and casting ===
In 2019 following the release of Thadam there were rumours that a Hindi remake was in the works. On 4 March 2020 the film was officially announced as an untitled crime-thriller by Bhushan Kumar and Murad Khetani through social media, confirming that T-Series are co-producing the film with debutant Vardhan Ketkar announced as director. Sidharth Malhotra was first announced as the lead alongside Mrunal Thakur. The filming was supposed to begin in mid-2020 with a release date of 20 November 2020, but it was postponed following the coronavirus outbreak in late March 2020. Later in January 2021, there were reports of Sidharth Malhotra walking out of the project for unknown reasons and the project was put on a hold.

In July 2021 the makers announced the revival of the project with Aditya Roy Kapur as the new lead. Later, in September 2021, Mrunal Thakur was also confirmed to be a part of the project. Vedika Pinto was selected to appear as the love interest opposite Aditya. Ronit Roy and Navneet Kaur Thind was also cast to play important roles in the film.

=== Filming ===
Filming began in October 2021 on the auspicious occasion of Dussehra. The second schedule began in May 2022 in Mumbai with Thakur joining the shoot alongside Ronit Roy. The team wrapped up the filming in July 2022.

== Soundtrack ==
Gumraah

Soundtrack album by Mithoon, Vishal Mishra, Tanishk Bagchi and Abhijit Vaghani
- Released: 14 March 2023
- Recorded: 2022–2023
- Studios: VM Studio, New Edge Studio, Future Sound of Bombay & Headroom Studio Mumbai
- Genre: Feature film soundtrack
- Length: 13:48
- Language: Hindi
- Label: T-Series

Official audio
- Gumraah – Full Album on YouTube

Mithoon, Vishal Mishra, Tanishk Bagchi and Abhijit Vaghani have composed songs for the film. First single titled "Soniye Ji" sung, composed, and written by Vishal Mishra was released on 14 March 2023. On 18 March 2023 another song titled "Ghar Nahi Jana" composed by Tanishk Bagchi and sung by Armaan Malik, Zahrah S Khan and Salma Agha was released. The third single title "Allah De Bande" was released on 31 March 2023 and the title track was released on 5 April 2023.

Track Listing
No.	Title	Lyrics	Music	Singer(s)	Length
1.	"Soniye Je"	Vishal Mishra	Vishal Mishra	Vishal Mishra	2:40
2.	"Ghar Nahi Jana"	Rashmi Virag	Tanishk Bagchi	Armaan Malik, Zahrah S Khan, Salma Agha	3:41
3.	"Allah De Bande"	Mithoon	Mithoon	Jubin Nautiyal, Aaman Trikha, Mithoon	4:48
4.	"Gumraah (Title Track)"	Bhrigu Parashar	Abhijit Vaghani	Sachet Tandon, Parampara Thakur	2:39
Total length:					13:48

== Release ==
The film was theatrically released on 7 April 2023. The digital rights were acquired by Netflix and the film started streaming on the platform as from 4 June 2023.

== Reception ==
=== Critical reception ===
Gumraah received mixed reviews from critics and audiences. On the review aggregator website Rotten Tomatoes, 33% of 9 critics' reviews are positive, with an average rating of 5/10.

Dhaval Roy of The Times of India rated the film 3.5 out of 5 stars and wrote "An engaging plot, twists and turns and good storytelling make Gumraah worth a visit to the theatre". Rishil Jogani of Pinkvilla rated the film 3.5 out of 5 stars and termed the film "very enjoyable" with elements of a commercial thriller. Ganesh Aaglave of Firstpost rated the film 3 out of 5 stars and wrote: "While the story with solid twists and turns looks exciting, the film lacked the gripping and pacey screenplay, which would have taken Gumraah to another level".

=== Box office ===
It flopped at the box office, opening worldwide at ₹1.22 crore.Opening weekend was ₹5.93 crore.

As of 27 April 2023, the film has grossed ₹9.86 crore (equivalent to ₹11 crore or US$1.1 million in 2026) in India and ₹0.82 crore (equivalent to ₹8.9 million or US$93,000 in 2026) overseas for a worldwide gross collection of ₹10.68 crore (equivalent to ₹12 crore or US$1.2 million in 2026).

The film underperformed commercially, becoming a box-office bomb.
