= Symbiosis Law School =

Law school in Pune, India

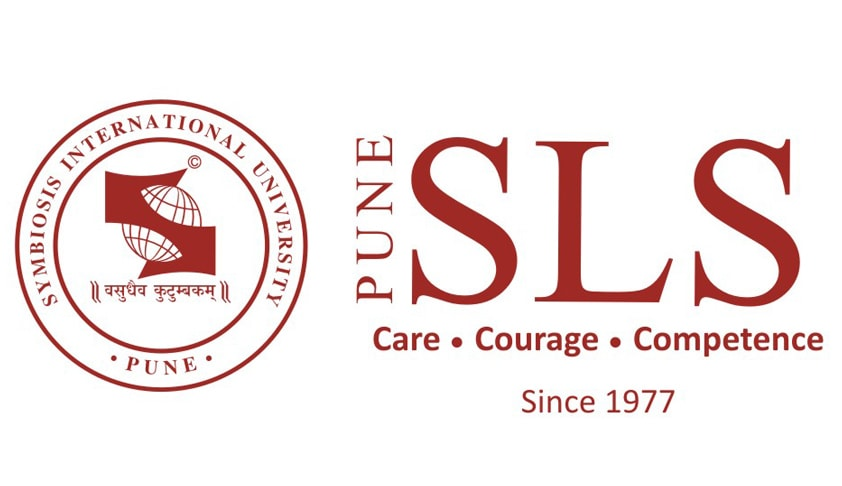
- Symbiosis Law School, Pune
- Former name: Symbiosis Society's Law College
- Motto: Vasudhaiva Kutumbakam
- Motto in English: The world is one family
- Type: Private law school
- Established: 1977; 49 years ago
- Founders: Symbiosis Society; S. B. Mujumdar
- Parent institution: Symbiosis International University
- Director: Shashikala Gurpur (Pune); Dr Rawandale (Noida)
- Location: Pune, India
- Campus: Pune
- Website: www.symlaw.edu.in

Symbiosis Law School (SLS) is a law school with campuses located in Pune, Noida, Hyderabad, and Nagpur in India. The law school in Pune was established in 1977 under the banner of Symbiosis Society, under the patronage of S. B. Mujumdar, President and Founder Director. It is registered under the Societies Registration Act, 1860, and the Bombay Public Trust, Act, 1950. Symbiosis Law School is a constituent college of the Symbiosis International University.

== Organisation and administration ==
=== Faculty ===
The law school has 25 full-time faculty members which include two professors, three associate professors, 19 assistant professors and one teaching associate and one adjunct faculty.

=== Centers of specialization ===
SLSP has set up six Centers of Specialization in Public Law & Governance, Private Laws, Transnational & Global Legal Studies, Corporate Laws, Justice Education and Technology & Innovation Laws, to promote research activities. Under these Centers of Specialization, research projects are being carried out, such as Community Legal Care, Legal aid activities, Microsoft IPR Chair, Prisoner's Rights, Law Reform Projects on Common Property with NLSIU, Bangalore & Compensation for rape victims with National Commission for Women alongside supportive research for Law Commission of India. IPC handbook, book research on Feminist Jurisprudence, Legal Regulation of Biotechnology and Educational Laws are other initiatives.

== Academics ==
Symbiosis Law School Pune offers undergraduate, postgraduate and Ph.D. programmes. It also offers diploma and certificate studies.

=== Admissions ===
Admission for Undergraduate Programmers is through Symbiosis Law Admission Test (SLAT) which is a common written test for the admission processes of Undergraduate Institutes of Symbiosis International University (SIU). The Entrance Test is followed by Writing Ability Test and Personal Interview which makes SLS Pune the first law school to adopt admission through these steps. SLAT has replaced what was earlier known as SET - Symbiosis Entrance Test for Law.

=== In-house journals ===
Symbiosis Contemporary Law Journal

It is a revamped journal of SLS which has replaced the erstwhile journals of the Law School - Symbiosis Law Times, Journal of Symbiosis Law School & IPR Chronicle and consolidated into one journal. It brings the issues which are contemporary to legal education in the country in the fields of Constitutional Law, Corporate Laws, Comparative and International legal studies, Intellectual Property Rights, Innovations in Technology and the recent regulations. It is an annual publication.

Symbiosis Student Law Review

Its provides a platform for the students of the law schools of the country to share their views and expertise in law. This annual journal aims at encouraging students research and to publish their research articles, essays and conference papers.

Lex-Et Symbiosis - Newsletter

This is the bi-annual newsletter of the school which provides updates on campus activities and other events that takes place in the Law School. It also provides awareness of happenings in the legal field.

Justice Y. V. Chandrachud Memorial Public Lecture Series Handbook

The handbook of memorial public lecture series covers public lectures organized by SLS Pune, commemorating the life and work of Indian educational thinkers and practitioners as well as contemporary legal issues. It aims at sharing the knowledge, to reach out to policy makers, the media and the general public, to celebrate the memory and contribution of Late Justice Y. V. Chandrachud, a son of Maharashtra, one of the eminent Judges of Supreme Court of India and the Advisor and professor emeritus of SLS.

=== Rankings ===
University rankings

Law – India
- NIRF (2024): 5
- India Today (2022): 5
- Private colleges
- Outlook India (2022): 2

SLS (Pune) was ranked fifth in India by the National Institutional Ranking Framework (NIRF) in 2024. It was ranked fifth in India by India Today's "India's Best Law Colleges 2022" and second by Outlook India's "Top 30 Private Law Colleges In India" of 2022.

== Student life ==
=== Student organizations ===
The Student Advisory Board is the apex student body of the institution and is primarily responsible for all student activities in the college. It also oversees and supervises all other student bodies in the college. It is headed by a president and four vice presidents with various cabinet members. It is governed by the "Symbiosis Law School, Pune Student Advisory Board Constitution".

Clubs and societies of Symbiosis Law School, Pune, include the Human Rights Cell (HRC), The Environment Protection and Consumer Rights Organization (Ecocon), Legal Aid and Literacy Cell, Tech Legal Cell, Alumni Cell, Corporate Cell, Law Hawks Forum, International Cell - ILSA, Sports Committee, Law and Economics cell (LAWECON) and the Student Bar Association (SBA). The institution has been a partner institute for Surana & Surana International Technology Law Moot Court Competition from 2008 onwards.

=== Symbhav ===
The students of Symbiosis Law School, Pune, started Symbhav – a Cultural Fest in February 2009 followed by an edition in 2010. Since its inception in 2009, it has had the participation of 20 teams from all over the country and SAARC nations including leading national law schools.
