= Nishaanchi Part 2 =

2025 Indian film by Anurag Kashyap

- Directed by: Anurag Kashyap
- Written by: Anurag Kashyap; Ranjan Chandel; Prasoon Mishra
- Produced by: Ajay Rai; Ranjan Singh
- Starring: Monika Panwar; Aaishvary Thackeray; Vedika Pinto; Kumud Mishra; Mohammed Zeeshan Ayyub
- Cinematography: Sylvester Fonseca
- Edited by: Aarti Bajaj
- Music by: Anurag Saikia; Manan Bhardwaj; Aaishvary Thackeray; Deepak Thakur; Parimal Shais; Kalmi
- Production companies: JAR Pictures; Flip Films
- Distributed by: Amazon MGM Studios (via Amazon Prime Video)
- Release date: 14 November 2025
- Running time: 145 minutes
- Country: India
- Language: Hindi

Nishaanchi Part 2 (transl. Sharpshooter) is a 2025 Indian Hindi-language crime drama film directed by Anurag Kashyap, who also co-wrote the script with Ranjan Chandel and Prasoon Mishra. Produced by Ajay Rai and Ranjan Singh under JAR Pictures and Flip Films, and distributed by Amazon MGM Studios, the film is a direct sequel to Nishaanchi, serving as the second and final instalment of the duology. The film stars Aaishvary Thackeray in dual roles, along with Vedika Pinto, Monika Panwar, Kumud Mishra and Mohammed Zeeshan Ayyub, all of them reprise their roles from the first part.

Originally shot as a single film, principal photography began in early 2024 and completed by July, where filming predominantly took place in Lucknow and Kanpur. The film was photographed by Sylvester Fonseca and edited by Aarti Bajaj. It also featured a soundtrack composed by Anurag Saikia, Manan Bhardwaj, Deepak Thakur, Parimal Shais, Kalmi and Aaishvary himself. Due to its five and a half-hour long runtime, the film was split into two parts, with the second part being 145 minutes long.

Nishaanchi Part 2 was released through Amazon Prime Video on 14 November 2025, along with the first part, largely owing to the predecessor's underperformance.

== Synopsis ==
Ten years after the events of the first film, Babloo Nishaanchi returns from prison after serving his sentence and finds out that Dabloo has secured a stable life but heartbroken as his former girlfriend Rinku is living with him. Meanwhile, minister Ambika Prasad tries to manipulate Babloo into becoming a hitman so that he could secure his position. As both Babloo and Dabloo navigate their fractured relationship, their mother Manjari wanted them to keep them away from the world of crime, which follows the crux of the story.

== Cast ==
- Monika Panwar as Manjari, Babloo and Dabloo's mother
- Aaishvary Thackeray in a dual role as Babloo Nishaanchi and Dabloo Wafadaar Singh
- Vedika Pinto as Rangeeli Rinku, Babloo's former girlfriend and Dabloo's love interest
- Mohammed Zeeshan Ayyub as Inspector Kamal Ajeeb
- Kumud Mishra as Ambika Prasad
  - Girish Sharma as young Ambika Prasad
- Erika Jason as "anti-social" Anjana
- Sahaarsh Shuklaa as Puraane
- Prateek Pachauri as Phlunky
- David Michael Harrison as Vlad
- Gaurav Singh as Pankaj
- Amresh Aryan as Inspector Pankaj Encounter
- Suman Pathak as the audition judge
- Pramod Sharma as SP (uncredited)

== Production ==
Nishaanchi was written by Kashyap in 2016 after the production of Mukkabaaz (2017). Based on the idea of a mother and her twin children, he wrote the script within four days which he considered a reimagination of the Hindi cinema in the 1970s, largely influenced by the Salim–Javed duo's contribution to the masala films at that time, that he grew up watching in childhood. Likewise, the film also explored the familiar themes of family bonding, crimes and emotions. Deciding to cast newcomers so that can provide ample time and focus for the film, Kashyap cast late Bal Thackeray's grandson Aaishvary Thackeray for the lead role, after being impressed by the script; his role being a dual role of twin brothers was revealed after the shoot. Vedika Pinto and Monika Panwar were later cast as the female lead and the protagonists' mother, respectively.

After extensive pre-production and preparations, filming for Nishaanchi commenced in early-2024 and was completed by that July. The film was predominantly shot in Lucknow and Kanpur, for a span of 69 days, which Kashyap considered his most elaborate shoot yet. Visual effects were also done to showcase the dual roles of the lead character in an elaborate manner. Though the original footage was around four hours long, Kashyap decided to split the film into two parts so that it could be viable for the Indian theatrical market. The final duration of the film is around 145 minutes long.

== Music ==
The soundtrack featured nine songs composed by Anurag Saikia, Manan Bhardwaj, Deepak Thakur, Parimal Shais, Kalmi and Aaishvary himself, while lyrics were written by Shashwat Dwivedi, Dr. Sagar, Raaj Babu, Bhardwaj and Thakur. It was released through Zee Music Company on 14 November 2025.

== Release ==
Nishaanchi Part 2 was directly released through Amazon Prime Video on 14 November 2025 along with Nishaanchi as a double feature. This decision was largely attributed to the theatrical underperformance of Nishaanchi as the film was directly launched on the platform without any prior announcement or promotions. Regarding this strategy, Kashyap blamed the lack of support from the audiences for the predecessor, while also adding that the mandatory eight-week window between the film's theatrical and OTT release was the reason for the lack of promotions for the sequel. He further expressed his discontent on how exhibitors treat non tent-pole or indie films. The decision for a direct-to-streaming release along with its predecessor was a collective measure by Kashyap and Amazon MGM Studios to provide a complete experience for the viewers.

== Reception ==
Abhishek Shrivatsava of The Times of India rated 3/5 stars, saying "In the end, Nishaanchi 2 leaves you with a nagging thought—did this story really need a second chapter? Viewed in hindsight, the two films could easily have been trimmed, tightened, and shaped into one sharper, more impactful narrative. There’s a good film buried in here, but it often feels stretched when it should have been sprinting. Hardcore Kashyap fans will still find plenty to chew on—the familiar flavours, the rough edges, the bursts of energy—but for the rest, this will settle somewhere in the middle of his filmography, neither a misfire nor a standout, just a film that passes by without leaving a mark." Nandini Ramnath of Scroll.in wrote "Nishaanchi 2 improves on its predecessor in certain respects, but falls prey to the same plotting exigencies present in the films that have inspired it. The formula that Nishaanchi sets out to tweak proves to be stubbornly resistant to experimentation."

Rishabh Suri of Hindustan Times wrote "By the time the dust settles in this yet another heartland world created by Anurag, Nishaanchi 2 delivers a far smoother ride than expected. It may come from modest expectations, but it leaves you with the sense of a story finally told the way it always wanted to be." Sakshi Salil Chavan of Outlook wrote "The second film improves certain ideas but also inherits the narrative fatigue of the first, leaving the impression of a franchise that recognises its potential but cannot consistently execute it."

Shilajit Mitra of The Hollywood Reporter India wrote "There was a time when such debates felt crucial to a Kashyap film. But Nishaanchi finds the filmmaker at his most bewilderingly vague. It feels loose and inessential, and mostly shoots blanks." Sriva A of Moneycontrol wrote "the film has enough personality to avoid feeling empty. There are flashes of strong writing, and the atmosphere has a quiet pull. Fans of Kashyap will notice touches of his style—characters who hide more than they say, sudden emotional turns, and the mix of humour with danger. For others, the film may feel like a slow burn that never fully sparks. It doesn’t disappoint, but it doesn’t surprise either" considering the climax sequence and the emotional bond between Babloo and Manjari being similar to that of Deewaar (1975).
