= Musafir Cafe =

- Created by: Sharanya Rajgopal
- Based on: Musafir Cafe by Divya Prakash Dubey
- Written by: Divya Prakash Dubey; Sharanya Rajgopal
- Directed by: Ruchir Arun
- Starring: Vikrant Massey; Vedika Pinto; Mahima Makwana; Adil Hussain; Sadiya Siddiqui
- Music by: Songs: Garvit–Priyansh; Raghav Kaushik; Neel Adhikari; Background Score: Neel Adhikari
- Country of origin: India
- Original language: Hindi
- No. of seasons: 1
- No. of episodes: 8

Production
- Camera setup: Multi-camera
- Running time: 35-42 minutes
- Production companies: Terribly Tiny Tales; Homemade Stories

Original release
- Network: Netflix
- Release: 24 July 2026 – present

Musafir Cafe is a 2026 Netflix original Hindi-language television series directed by Ruchir Arun, based on writer Divya Prakash Dubey book of the same name. The series stars Vikrant Massey, Vedika Pinto, Mahima Makwana, Adil Hussain, Sadiya Siddiqui, Rajeev Siddhartha, Anubha Fatehpuria and others.

== Cast ==
- Vikrant Massey as Chander Mohan Sharma
- Vedika Pinto as Sudha Tripathi
- Mahima Makwana as Preeti Kaushik
- Rajeev Siddhartha as Rahil Qureshi
- Adil Hussain as Mark Abraham
- Sadiya Siddiqui as Nilima
- Ismeet Kohli as Gargi
- Prachi Bhatnagar as Priya
- Loveleen Mishra as Sudha's mother
- Anubha Fatehpuria as Chander's mother
- Divya Prakash Dubey as himself

== Release ==
The series premiered on 24 July 2026 at Netflix.

== Critical reception ==
Writing for India Today Anurag Singh Bohra gave 3.5 stars to the series and wrote that the series "brings modern romance and old-school warmth together with quiet confidence and heart." Nandini Ramnath reviewing for Scroll.in wrote "The pacing can be sluggish." Rediff.com reviewer Sukanya Verma stated "Too random to be a cliffhanger."

The Indian Express reviewer Shubhra Gupta wrote "Why does it take eight stretched episodes to tell a tale that would have been better told in half the time? Why is the serene city of Bhopal such a fleeting presence the famed lake glimpsed from a terrace cafe- even though it’s named frequently through the show? Those are also questions which this could-have-been-a-pyaari-prem kahani don’t answer well enough."

Manjusha Radhakrishnan of Gulf News opined "It ends on a cliffhanger. Without giving too much away, the final moments raise questions that linger long after the credits roll."

The Hollywood Reporter India reviewer Rahul Desai called the series "doesn’t take sides in the contest between the individualism of romance and the romance of individualism." NDTV reviewer Madhumanti Pait Chowdhury opined that "The end leaves an expectation and an uneasiness about what happened to them." Wion reviewer Shomini Sen stated that the series "ends at a point which opens up possibilities of a sequel."

A reviewer from The New Indian Express wrote "The writers come dangerously close to projecting Sudha as a Manic Pixie Dream Girl prototype." Another reviewer from News18 rated the series 3.5 stars and stated "there are contrived attempts to make the series something that it’s not. And that’s when the narrative starts sinking in bits and parts."

The Free Press Journal reviewer Ria Sharma opined "It's not a masterpiece, nor does it offer a groundbreaking story, but it succeeds in creating a warm viewing experience." Anindita Mukhopadhyay for India TV praised Ruchir Arun's direction stating "He allows moments to breathe, letting conversations and silences carry the emotions instead of relying on dramatic twists."

ABP News reviewer Amit Bhatia felt the series is "disappointing watch that ultimately feels like a waste of time." Times Now reviewer Soumyabrata Gupta stated "Like the travellers who stop by the quaint Musafir Cafe, the series sings of a story worth hearing." Sunny Singh of NewsX stated "The last episode sets the stage for emotional closure and then cuts off abruptly, leaving many loose ends in preparation for the next season." Indulge Express reviewer Bristi Dey rated the series 4 out of 5 stars.

== Sequel ==
On 6 August 2026 Netflix announced Season 2 of the series.
