= Symbiosis International University =

Private higher-education institute in Maharashtra, India

Symbiosis International (Deemed University)
- Motto: Vasudhaiva Kutumbakam
- Motto in English: The world is one family
- Type: Private deemed university
- Established: 1971; 55 years ago
- Founder: Dr. S B Mujumdar
- Parent institution: Symbiosis Society
- Affiliations: UGC, AALAU
- Chancellor: S. B. Mujumdar
- Vice-Chancellor: Ramakrishnan Raman
- Location: Pune, Maharashtra, India; 18.537479°N 73.731267°E
- Campus: Urban, multiples
- Mascot: The common man
- Website: www.siu.edu.in

Symbiosis International (Deemed University), is a multi-campus private, deemed university located in the city of Pune, India. The university is located in various campuses in Pune, Bengaluru, Hyderabad, Nashik, Noida, Nagpur etc.

== Rankings ==
University rankings

General – international
- QS (Asia) (2023): 351–400
- Times (World) (2023): 801–1000
- Times (Asia) (2022): 251–300
- Times (Emerging) (2022): 301–350

General – India
- NIRF (Overall) (2024): 52
- NIRF (Universities) (2024): 31

Engineering – India
- India Today (2020): 38
- Private colleges
- Outlook India (2022): 13

Business/Management – India
- NIRF (2024): 13
- Private colleges
- Outlook India (2020): 6

Internationally, Symbiosis International University was ranked between 1001–1200 in the world by the Times Higher Education World University Rankings for 2024.

In India, the National Institutional Ranking Framework (NIRF) ranked Symbiosis 24th among universities in 2025 and 40th overall.

Symbiosis Institute of Technology, its engineering college, was ranked 48 among engineering colleges by India Today in 2020. It was ranked 13 among private engineering colleges in India by Outlook India in 2022.

The Symbiosis Institute of Business Management It was ranked sixth among private business schools in India by Outlook India's "Outlook-ICARE MBA Rankings: Top 150 Private MBA Institutions" of 2020. The National Institutional Ranking Framework (NIRF) ranked it 11th in 2025.

== See also ==
- Symbiosis Institute of Business Management, Pune
- Symbiosis Law School
- List of universities in India
- Universities and colleges in India
