= Symbiosis Society =

Family of educational institutions in India

- Established: 1971; 55 years ago
- Founder: S. B. Mujumdar
- Founded at: Pune, Maharashtra, India
- Location: India
- President: S. B. Mujumdar
- Principal Director: Vidya Yeravdekar
- Website: symbiosis.ac.in

The Symbiosis Society is a family of 64 educational institutions on 19 campuses in India hosting 34,000 students. It manages the Symbiosis International University (SIU), formerly Symbiosis International Education Centre. It was established in 1971 by S. B. Mujumdar, who serves as the president, and is headed by Vidya Yeravdekar.

== Constituent institutes ==
Institutes within the society include:

=== Schools ===
- Symbiosis Primary & Secondary School, Pune
- Symbiosis International School, Pune
- Symbiosis Nursery School, Pune
- Symbiosis Day Care Centre, Pune
- Symbiosis Open School, Pune
- Symbiosis School, Harali
- Symbiosis Kindergarten, Nashik
- Symbiosis School, Nashik

=== University and its constituents* ===
*(this list might be incomplete)

- Symbiosis International University
  - Symbiosis Institute of Technology (SIT, Pune)
  - Symbiosis Institute of Design (SID, Pune)
  - Symbiosis Skills and Professional University (SSPU, Pune, Maharashtra)
  - Symbiosis Institute of Business Management (SIBM, Pune, Maharashtra)
  - Symbiosis School of Photography
  - Symbiosis School of Biological Sciences
  - Symbiosis Institute of International Studies
  - Symbiosis School of Liberal Arts
  - Symbiosis School of Culinary Arts
  - Symbiosis School of Banking and Finance
  - Symbiosis Institute of Design (SID Nagpur).
  - Symbiosis School of Planning and Architecture.
  - Symbiosis School of Sports Sciences
  - Symbiosis Institute of Media and Communication (SIMC, Bengaluru Urban, Karnataka)
  - Symbiosis Institute of Media and Communication (SIMC, Pune, Maharashtra)
  - Symbiosis School of Nursing (Jaipur, Rajasthan)
  - Symbiosis Center for Management and Human Resource Development (SCMHRD, Pune)
  - Symbiosis Centre for Information Technology (SCIT, Pune)
  - Symbiosis Law School (SLS) (Pune, Noida, Hyderabad and Nagpur )
  - Symbiosis Institute of Management Studies, Pune (SIMS)
  - Symbiosis Institute of International Business (SIIB)
  - Symbiosis Institute of Telecom Management
  - Symbiosis Statistical Institute (SSI, Pune)
  - Symbiosis Institute of Operations Management
  - Symbiosis Institute of Geoinformatics (SIG, Pune)
  - Symbiosis Institute of Computer Studies and Research
  - Symbiosis School of Economics
  - Symbiosis College of Arts and Commerce, Pune
