= Maira Bes-Rastrollo =

Spanish researcher

Maira Bes-Rastrollo is a professor of preventive medicine and public health at the University of Navarra whose research on ultra-processed food has been widely covered in the media.
