= Nishaanchi =

2025 Indian film by Anurag Kashyap

- Theatrical release poster
- Directed by: Anurag Kashyap
- Written by: Anurag Kashyap; Ranjan Chandel; Omjit Sahu
- Produced by: Ajay Rai; Ranjan Singh
- Starring: Aaishvary Thackeray; Vedika Pinto; Monika Panwar; Kumud Mishra; Mohammed Zeeshan Ayyub; Vineet Kumar Singh
- Cinematography: Sylvester Fonseca
- Edited by: Aarti Bajaj
- Music by: Anurag Saikia; Manan Bhardwaj; Aaishvary Thackeray; Dhruv Ghanekar; Nishikar Chhibber
- Production companies: JAR Pictures; Flip Films
- Distributed by: Amazon MGM Studios; Pen Marudhar
- Release date: 19 September 2025
- Running time: 177 minutes
- Country: India
- Language: Hindi
- Budget: approx. ₹10-25 crore
- Box office: est. ₹1 crore

Nishaanchi is a 2025 Indian Hindi-language crime drama film directed by Anurag Kashyap who co-wrote the film with Ranjan Chandel and Omjit Sahu and produced by Ajay Rai and Ranjan Singh under JAR Pictures, in association with Flip Films. The first instalment of a duology, it stars Aaishvary Thackeray in his film debut, playing dual roles while Vedika Pinto, Monika Panwar, Kumud Mishra, Mohammed Zeeshan Ayyub and Vineet Kumar Singh appear in pivotal roles.

Kashyap wrote the script for Nishaanchi in late-2016 inspired by the masala films of Salim–Javed duo in the 1970s, and the project being materialized after the involvement of Amazon MGM Studios. Following delays due to casting and pre-production, the film began production in early 2024 and continued till that July where filming was shot in Lucknow and Kanpur. The film was photographed by Sylvester Fonseca and edited by Aarti Bajaj, and featured a soundtrack composed by Anurag Saikia, Manan Bhardwaj, Dhruv Ghanekar, Nishikar Chhibber and Aaishvary himself. Due to the film's four hour long runtime, it was split into two parts, with the first part running for 177 minutes long.

Nishaanchi was theatrically released on 19 September 2025, receiving mixed-to-positive reviews from critics and was a box-office bomb, grossing ₹1 crore. A direct sequel, Nishaanchi Part 2 released via Amazon Prime Video on 14 November 2025 along with the first part, as a result of the film's underperformance.

== Premise ==
A story of twin brothers caught between crime and conscience, where love, loss, and fate test the strength of their bond.

== Cast ==
- Aaishvary Thackeray in a dual role as Babloo Nishaanchi and Dabloo Wafadaar Singh
- Vedika Pinto as Rangeeli Rinku, Babloo's love interest
- Monika Panwar as Manjari, Babloo and Dabloo's mother
- Kumud Mishra as Ambika Prasad
  - Girish Sharma as young Ambika Prasad
- Mohammed Zeeshan Ayyub as Inspector Kamal Ajeeb
- Rajesh Kumar as Bhola Pehalwan
- Durgesh Kumar as Bank Security Guard
- Shubham Tiwari as Hawa Hawai
- Sachin Singh as Druggie Prisoner
- Mukesh Bhatt as Brilliance Band Emcee
- Jameel Khan as Brilliance Band Member
- Vineet Kumar Singh as Zabardast Pehelwaan, Manjari's husband, and father to Babloo and Dabloo
- Erika Jason as Anjana (anti-social Anjana), Babloo's fling
- Raghav Juyal

== Production ==
=== Development ===
"Salim–Javed’s scripts feature complex characters that have a mix of moral ambiguity and raw emotion, that make even large-than-life stories feel authentic. That’s what Nishaanchi channels—the tension, the moral dilemmas, the deeply human stories set against a larger canvas. It’s not about copying the 1970s; it’s about capturing that spirit of storytelling, the intensity and heart, and reimagining it for today’s audience."

— Anurag Kashyap on Nishaanchi

Anurag Kashyap said that Nishaanchi was born "out of a very personal and instinctive space". The genesis of the film dated back to 2016 when Kashyap was working on Mukkabaaz (2017). While that film was a return to his "older, more raw style of filmmaking" with newer talents, he somehow harboured the idea of consciously writing a story which would be mounted on a bigger scale. Kashyap then had the one-line idea of a mother and her twins and developed a complete script within 3–4 days.

Kashyap said that he inspired by the films of Salim–Javed such as Mother India (1957), Ram Aur Shyam (1967) and Sholay (1975), which was the tradition of storytelling that he grew up with, exploring the themes of emotions, family bonding, crime and punishment, all being blended through the commercial aspects of the 1970s Indian films and wanted to reimagine it with the current generation of audiences. The film was initially co-produced by Ajay Rai's JAR Pictures, which earlier produced Gangs of Wasseypur, Gangs of Wasseypur 2 (both 2012) and Choked (2020) and Ranjan Singh's Flip Films. Later, Amazon MGM Studios involved in the project after Kashyap had met one of the company's heads during a trip to Melbourne and provided him the script, thereby greenlighting the project.

=== Casting ===
Kashyap decided to work with newcomers in the lead role over established actors as they could provide complete commitment to his project. He chose Aaishvary Thackeray, grandson of late Bal Thackeray, to play the lead role in his debut film. Kashyap presented the script to Aaishvary in late-2020, who was impressed by it. Vedika Pinto was chosen to play the female lead, who was approached two years later. Kashyap instructed both Aaishvary and Vedika to not commit any other projects so that they could be fully focused on Nishaanchi.

Both the actors went to Kanpur, where the film was predominantly shot, so that they could attend workshop, embark on the culture of the city and understand the local dialect as well. Kashyap said that both the actors had provided an "immense amount of hunger and devotion" surrendering to the process and stayed with the characters, which he had rarely seen in any other actors, adding that Aaishvary was excited to take on more and more challenges, so did Vedika. Aaishvary's character being a dual role was not revealed as he was a newcomer during that time; he revealed it only after six months post-shooting. Monika Panwar was chosen to play the role of the protagonists' mother, whose character progresses from her twenties to fifties. Her characters' name Manjari was also Kashyap's mother name as well.

=== Filming and post-production ===
Nishaanchi was shot predominantly in Uttar Pradesh with Lucknow and Kanpur serving as the principal locations. The film began production in early-2024 and was nearly completed by that July. Kashyap said that while most of his films were shot within 30 days, Nishaanchi was shot within 69 days which he considered his "longest, most elaborate shoot yet". Visual effects were handled by Red Chillies VFX which were used for filming the dual role sequences, where Kashyap added that both sequences were shot two months apart and the use of special effects were efficient in capturing the two distinctive roles. Kashyap had shot around four hours of footage for the film, but decided to split it into two parts in order to be viable for the Indian theatrical market.

== Themes and influences ==
Though Kashyap had reiterated at several instances on the film being inspired from Salim–Javed's masala ventures, several critics admitted that the film had inspiration from Gangs of Wasseypur series, however, Kashyap had denied the same.

== Music ==
The album featured 15 songs composed by Anurag Saikia, Manan Bhardwaj, Dhruv Ghanekar, Nishikar Chhibber and Aaishvary himself, in his maiden composition and songwriting debut, while lyrics for the songs were written by Shashwat Dwivedi, Varun Grover, Dr. Sagar, Pyarelal Yadav, Renu Chhiber, Bhardwaj and Aaishvary. The album was released under the Zee Music Company label on 5 September 2025.

== Marketing and release ==
The teaser was released on 8 August 2025. The trailer was released on 3 September 2025. Nishaanchi was theatrically released on 19 September 2025.

== Reception ==
On the review aggregator website Rotten Tomatoes, 67% of 12 critics' reviews are positive, with an average rating of 6.2/10. Saibal Chatterjee of NDTV rated it 3/5 stars and commented that "It brims with raw action, earthy humour and gnarled emotions that frequently unleash full-blown violence." Shubhra Gupta of The Indian Express gave 2.5 stars out of 5 and stated that "The best of Anurag Kashyap has always included scenes and situations which go for the jugular, no waffling, no wasting time, but in this one, you are hard put to find those that will be stayers." Rahul Desai of The Hollywood Reporter India observed that "Anurag Kashyap searches for vintage Anurag Kashyap for 176 minutes, but the patience does not pay off."

Rishabh Suri of Hindustan Times gave 3 stars out of 5 and said that "Nishaanchi is Kashyap returning to familiar territory, armed with a fresh cast and his trademark mix of grit and humour. The film has moments that sparkle but also stretches that weigh it down. If you can overlook the drag, the performances and Kashyap’s eye for detail make it worth a watch, though it never quite escapes the shadow of Wasseypur." Anuj Kumar of The Hindu feels that "A little off the mark, a little overdone, this unruly tale of crime and revenge feels like an indulgent tribute to the best of the filmmaker." Abhishek Srivastava of The Times of India gave it 3.5 stars out of 5 and said that "‘Nishaanchi’ is not a perfect film, but it is a compelling one. The runtime is heavy, and the songs don't stay with you, but the world Kashyap builds and the performances make it worth sitting through. It mixes crime, comedy, and family drama in a way that feels both old-school and new."

Sana Farzeen of India Today rated it 3/5 stars and said that "Anurag Kashyap's 'Nishaanchi' offers a colourful mix of drama, humour and strong performances. The film's overindulgence and familiar tropes may divide audiences, but a sequel promises more twists." Mayur Sanap of Rediff.com gave it 3 stars out of 5 and noted that "While Nishaanchi is not a homerun for Anurag Kashyap, there's enough joy in this audience pleaser." Nandini Ramnath of Scroll.in stated that "The movie has its share of wild moments, cheeky comedy and meta-asides about the influence of popular Hindi cinema. Nishaanchi benefits hugely from Kashyap’s talent for pushing actors to realise their full potential."

Shubham Kulkarni of OTTPlay rated it 3/5 stars and said that "Anurag Kashyap revisits gangsters and the heartland — but not as sharply as Gangs of Wasseypur. The sparks are there, the setup is solid, but Part 1 barely scratches its full potential." Devesh Sharma of Filmfare gave it 3.5 stars and commented that "Nishaanchi is pure Salim-Javed drama. Newcomer Aaishvary Thackeray impresses in a double role." Critic based at Bollywood Hungama rated it 3/5 stars and said that "Nishaanchi is a gritty, engaging ride that reaffirms Anurag Kashyap’s knack for blending crime, drama, and dark humour into a compelling narrative."

Subhash K. Jha writing for News 24 gave it 4 stars out of 5 and writes in his review that "Anurag Kashyap never fails to tell it like it is. His new film Nishaanchi—a delightful melange of brutality and tenderness—opens with a bank robbery and concludes with one of the characters feeling frightfully betrayed and compromised." Titas Chowdhury of News18 also gave 4 stars out of 5 and said that "Anurag Kashyap's Nishaanchi is wildly chaotic but there’s a method to this madness. It’s earthy, unapologetically bizarre and revels in its maximalism. Monika Panwar stands out." Ganesh Aaglave of Firstpost rated it 3/5 stars and said that "With the non-linear editing and storytelling, rustic set-up and desi dialogues, Nishaanchi beautifully unfolds as a revenge crime drama with a musical touch."

== Sequel ==
A sequel titled Nishaanchi Part 2 was released directly on Amazon Prime Video on 14 November 2025, along with the first part.
