= Maira Shamsutdinova =

Soviet composer

- Occupations: Singer, composer
- Known for: Mayra Shamsutdinova house-museum

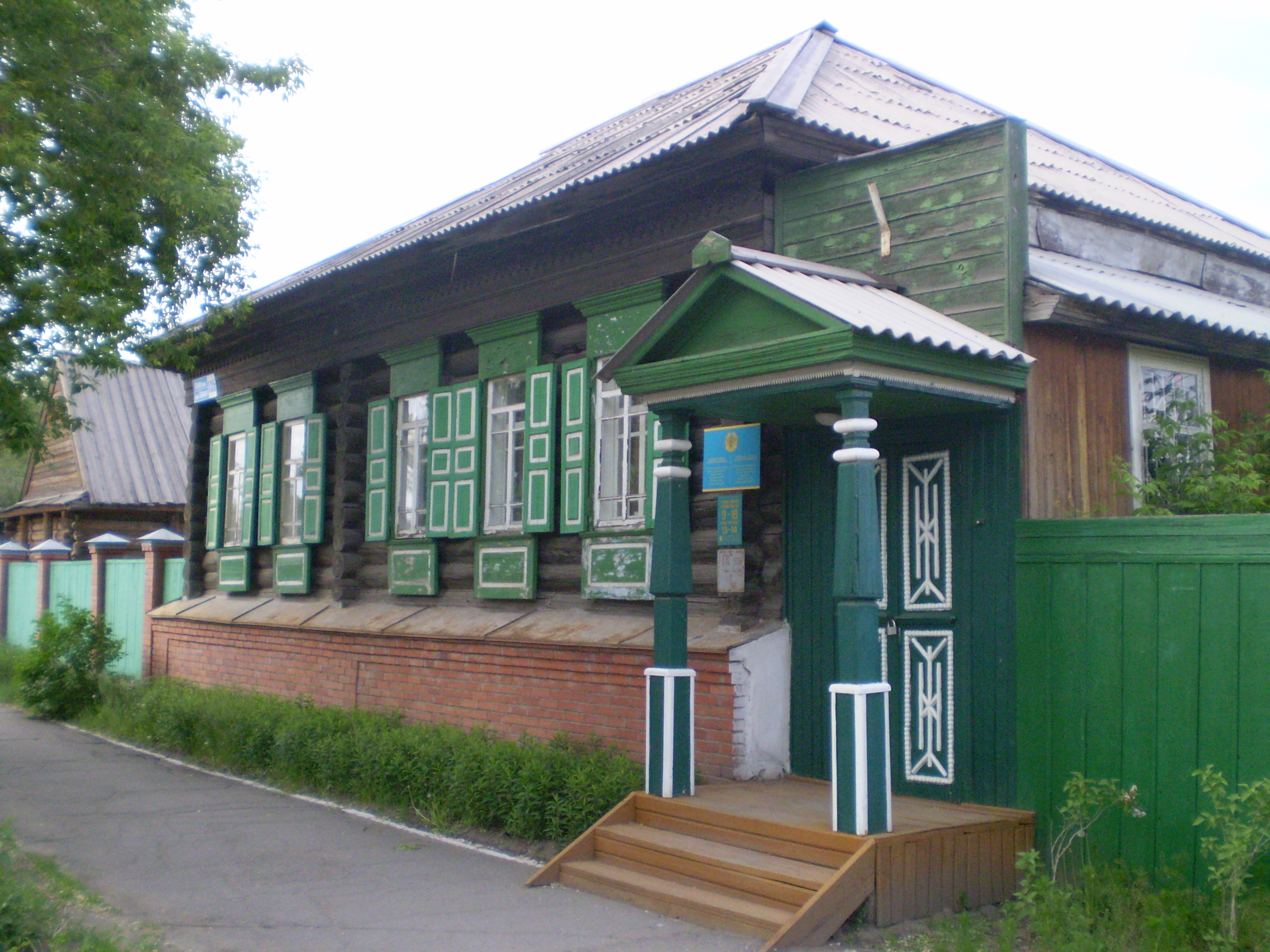
The Maira Shamsutdinova house-museum, a branch of G. N. Potanin Pavlodar Regional History Museum

Maira Shamsutdinova (Kazakh: Maıra Ýálıqyzy Shamsýtdınova; 6 May 1890 – 25 January 1927) was a Soviet/Kazakh singer and composer. There is a museum in her native Pavlodar dedicated to her.
