= Dhruv Ghanekar =

Indian composer and songwriter (born 1974)

Dhruv Ghanekar (born 30 April 1974) is a Music composer, song writer, producer and guitar player based in Mumbai, India. Ghanekar has performed and/or recorded with Richard Bona, Raul Midon, Trilok Gurtu, Ustad Zakir Hussain, Bernard Purdee, A.R Rahman, Bob Belden, Scott Kinsey, Etienne M'Bappe, Dominic Dipiazza, Louis Banks, Ranjit Barot. and many contemporary musicians from across the globe. His second 2nd album, Voyage, fuses sounds from Africa and India.

In 2015, Ghanekar was featured as a composer on the hit show Coke Studio Season 4.

Dhruv is one of founding partners of the iconic venue and music company blueFrog that kick started the indie music revolution in India.

In 2019, the Government of India commissioned him to score the world’s largest 3D mapped installation show called Gandhi Yatra - a 35-minute musical on the life of Mahatma Gandhi in Ahmedabad, India.

Ghanekar’s music for the British photographer’s Jimmy Nelson show Blink featured at the Atelier des Lumières in Paris in summer of 2021.

== Career ==
=== Early years ===
Dhruv’s career in the arts began as a singer studying music under the tutelage of Jialal Vasant ji. He acted in several feature films and on television. At the age of 14, he was nominated for the National Award for his work in the Shyam Benegal film, Susman . He also was the lead actor in the TV series Katha Sagar, featuring in its debut episode. He also had notable roles in films such as Trikaal and the epic Tv series Bharat Ek Khoj also by acclaimed director Shyam Benegal.

Dhruv began his journey in music as a singer, working with acclaimed music directors of the day, such as: Vanraj Bhatia, Louis Banks, Nathan, Sharang Dev and many more. In 1990, as he finished school he turned his attention to an acoustic guitar that was gifted to him. He quickly became obsessed with it and never looked back. Often practicing for 8 hours a day within a few years he began composing his own music. Though the sound was rudimentary in 1993 he formed the power trio Chakraview .

In 1995, he graduated from college with a degree in English literature from Mumbai University.

While still in college, Chakraview performed concerts all over India mainly at college festivals and in a short span of time gained a reputation. In 1996 Chakraview disbanded as Dhruv began to focus more on music production and teamed up with Ashutosh Phatak and formed Smoke Music.

=== Smoke Music Productions ===
In the early years they were mainly scoring commercials but within 1st year, Ashu and Dhruv - as they were known scored their first feature film Tamanna produced by Pooja Bhatt and Vishwesh Films. Kaizad Gustad, impressed with the music, approached them to create some songs for Bombay Boys. The music of Bombay Boys was a runaway hit and their collaboration with Javed Jaffry produced the cult classic Mumbhai. The success of the music catapulted their careers further as they cemented their position as the 1st call music directors in advertising and indie cinema. While scoring Bombay Boys, Dhruv took a hiatus and attended Musicians Institute, Los Angeles (1997–98). He won a scholarship to Berklee College of Music Boston which he later attended in 2003.

Upon his return from America, Dhruv continued producing music for ad commercials, feature films and also produced over a dozen pop albums for indi- pop artists like Mehnaz, Shiamak Davar and Kailash Kher. Smoke Music Production was now at the helm of the indie music movement in the country having several film credits, commercial pop albums and having score over 2500 commercials within 7 years. A few of their clients include Absolut Vodka, BBC One, TATA, Reliance, Pepsi, Asian Paints, UNILEVER, Pidilite, Mahindra and Mahindra.

=== The Blue Frog ===
The Blue frog was a 360 degree company that consisted of a 6000 sqft live music venue and club, a 4000 sqft space that housed 4 highly equipped recording studios, a record label, an artist management and a production company.

The Blue Frog Mumbai was voted as one of the top 10 venues in the world by The Independent UK. At the height of its success, the company had a footprint across 4 cities in India. Blue Frog is often cited as having revolutionised the independent music scene in the country. Between 2007 and 2019 across its various clubs, the Blue Frog had hosted over 4500 gigs by artists from India and across the globe. Some of the noted performers include Angélique Kidjo, John McLaughlin, Imogen Heap, Richard Bona, Manu Chao, Erik Truffaz, Nitin Sawhney, Joshua Redman and Anoushka Shankar.

Blue Frog Productions was home to the top composers in the country and produced music across commercials, television and films. It also offered strategic sound consultancy, integrated music services and custom designed audio experiences.

Blue Frog Records was launched a year after the club and was created to promote independent music in the country. The label launched several artists who went on to have successful careers and also released stalwarts such as John McLaughlin.

Blue Frog Sound labs were housed next to the blueFrog club in an airy 4000 sqft warehouse space. The Sound Labs consisted of four modern and highly equipped sound studios with acoustics designed by the UK based company Munro Associates and was used by the major producers in the music industry.

Blue Frog Delhi was launched in 2011, Blue Frog Pune in 2014 and Blue Frog Bangalore in 2015.

=== Wah Wah Music ===
In 2012, Dhruv established Wah Wah Music after Blue Frog. Wah Wah Music quickly established itself as the leading music production house producing Commercials for clients internationally as well as for the Indian sub-continent, music for virtually all Indian TV networks and several feature films and web series . In a short span of time WWM has won many prestigious international awards for his work in advertising and indie music. Most notable is Dhruv's work for the NIKE commercials that has won him the Cannes Lions, D&AD, Clios and more. Dhruv’s music on the Samsung commercial made it the most watched commercial on YouTube with over 21 crore views and counting.

In 2015 Dhruv Voyage was released under Wah Wah Music to critical acclaim. Voyage is a musical sojourn of various international cultures as seen and heard through his unique Indian lens.

The music is a celebration of the various folk traditions of India as seen through Dhruv's urban eye. The music is an eclectic fusion of North and West Africa, Jazz, Pop, Assamese Folk to Rajasthani Indian folk and Classic Rock into a singular sonic voice.

Voyage has the distinction of being the 1st indie album to top the iTunes India Bollywood charts, peaking at #3.

In 2015 Dhruv was also commissioned to produce 3 songs for the popular television show Coke Studio@MTV.

The album received over 6 industry nominations and won 2 GIMA Awards for Best Fusion Album of 2016, Best Rock Song and 2 IRAA Awards for Best Music Video and Producer Of The Year. In the last few years, Dhruv has also composed many singles for artists from across the globe. He composed and produced I'm Alive for Maher Zain and Atif Aslam in 2016 that has garnered over 3 Crore views on YouTube. In 2018, Dhruv was invited to re-produce the music of the Disney musical Aladdin adapting it for the Indian stage. He produced and recorded the score with the Czech Philharmonic Orchestra in Prague.

In 2019 Dhruv work on the film ‘Blink’ for Jimmy Nelson Foundation became the most awarded campaign of 2019 winning over 50 international awards. The film was produced by Agency: Wunderman Thompson, Amsterdam and directed by Senthil Kumar. the music for Blink was also featured at the Atelier des Lumières in Paris in summer of 2021.

In 2019 Dhruv was commissioned to score the world’s largest 3D mapped installation show called Gandhi Yatra - a 35 min musical on the life of Mahatma Gandhi in Gandhinagar, India. The show was commissioned by the Government of India.

In 2022 Dhruv finished working on the Kangana rana it film Dhaakad for which he composed 3 songs and score the background music.

Dhruv is working on the music for the web series Choona directed by Pushpinder Misra for Netflix.

=== Live Performances ===
Over the years Dhruv has played hundreds of concerts across India and also at major international festivals Oslo Mela, Sildajazz (Haugesund), Varangerfestivalen (Vadsø), Oslo Jazz Festival, Miri jazz Festival (Borneo) and big indian stages like Bacardi NH7 Weekender Festival and Jazz Yatra. He has collaborated & performed with artists from across the globe: Richard Bona, Trilok Gurtu, Raul Midon, Karim Ziad, Linley Marthe, Fazal Qureshi, Bob Belden to name a few.

Dhruv is also an endorsee of the internationally acclaimed PRS Guitars since 2011.

=== Film Scoring and Film Music ===
Year	Film/ Album	OST / Song	Artist	Credit
2022	Dhaakad	So Ja Re	Sunidhi Chauhan, Hariharan	Composed and Produced
		Dhaakad	Vasundhara Vee	Composed and Produced
		Babul	Richa Sharma	Composed and Produced
2021		Run	Vasundhara Vee	Composed and Produced
2021	The Beatles and India (Songs Inspired but the Film The Beatles and India)	Julia	Dhruv Ghanekar	Arranged and Produced
		Love You To	Dhruv Ghanekar	Arranged and Produced
2020		Sun lo Na	Ila Arun	Composed and Produced
2019		Maula	Reeva Rathod	Music Producer
		Ek Desh Ek Hum	Dhruv Ghanekar	Composed and Produced
2016		Mitho Laage	Dhruv Ghanekar & Mame Khan	Composed and Produced
2016		I'm Alive	Maher Zain & Atif Aslam	Composed and Produced
2015		Ae rab	Dhruv Ghanekar & Master Saleem	Composed and Produced
		Birha	Dhruv Ghanekar, Kalpana Patowary & Sonia Saigal	Composed and Produced
		Nimoli	Dhruv Ghanekar, Ila Arun and Bobkat	Composed and Produced
2015	Voyage	Zawi d	Dhruv Ghanekar feat. Etienne Mbappe, Karim Ziad, Linley Marthe	Composed and Produced
		Baare Baare	Dhruv Ghanekar feat. Kalpana Patowary, Karim Ziad	Composed and Produced
		Sway With Me	Dhruv, Vasudha Sharma	
		Dhima	Dhruv, Ila Arun, Karim Ziad, Linley Marthe	
		Voyage	Dhruv, Raul Midon, Etienne Mbappe	
		Is This India	Dhruv Ghanekar, Sabir Khan	
		the Boatman's Song	Dhruv, Kartik Das Baul	
		Anthem	Dhruv Ghanekar	
2015	The Trio Sessions	Mahaganapathim	Dhruv Ghanekar, Gino Banks, Sheldon D'silva	
		Night	Dhruv Ghanekar, Gino Banks, Sheldon D'silva	
		Axetortion	Dhruv Ghanekar, Gino Banks, Sheldon D'silva	
2012	Arjun: The Warrior Prince	Background Score	As Dhruv Ghanekar	
2012	London Paris New York	Background Score	As Dhruv Ghanekar	
2010	Ishan [ T.V. Series ]	I am the One	Dhruv Ghanekar & Nikhil Dsouza	
		Jo Pyar Ho Gaya	Dhruv Ghanekar, Rajiv Sunderesan & Mahalaxmi Iyer	
		Jo Pyar Ho Gaya ( Acoustic )	Dhruv Ghanekar, Rajiv Sunderesan & Mahalaxmi Iyer	
2009	Dhruv DIstance	Seven Eleven		
		Conscious		
		Tricky Disaster		
		Sundays		
		Perfect		
		Cunning Politics		
		Pop Quiz		
		Only If		
2008	Smoke Signals	Windy	Smoke Ashu & Dhruv	
		Yaad Tumhari	Smoke Ashu & Dhruv	
		On & On	Smoke Ashu & Dhruv	
		Tsunami	Smoke Ashu & Dhruv	
		Summertime Rocks	Smoke Ashu & Dhruv & kailash Kher	
		You're so Beautiful	Smoke Ashu & Dhruv	
		The final Frontier	Smoke Ashu & Dhruv	
		Lullaby	Smoke Ashu & Dhruv	
		Summer Sun	Smoke Ashu & Dhruv	
2008	Drona	Drona	Dhruv Ghanekar	
		Oop Cha	Dhruv Ghanekar & Sunidhi Chauhan	
		Bandagi	Dhruv Ghanekar, Roop Kumar Rathod & Sunidhi Chauhan	
		Nanhe Nanhe	Dhruv Ghanekar, Sadhana Sargam & Nandini Srikar	
		Khushi	Dhruv Ghanekar, Shaan	
		Drona v2	Dhruv Ghanekar & Sunidhi Chauhan	
		Oop Cha ( Fare play mix )	Dhruv Ghanekar & Sunidhi Chauhan	
2007	Broken Thread	Background Score	Ashutosh Phatak & Dhruv Ghanekar	
2007	MP3: Mera Pehla Pehla Pyaar	Background Score	Ashutosh Phatak & Dhruv Ghanekar	
2005	White Noise	Stone	Ashutosh Phatak & Dhruv Ghanekar	
		Slide	Ashutosh Phatak & Dhruv Ghanekar	
		In the Air	Ashutosh Phatak & Dhruv Ghanekar	
		Resonate	Ashutosh Phatak & Dhruv Ghanekar	
		Sos	Ashutosh Phatak & Dhruv Ghanekar	
		Retribution	Ashutosh Phatak & Dhruv Ghanekar	
		Conflict	Ashutosh Phatak & Dhruv Ghanekar	
		Olive	Ashutosh Phatak & Dhruv Ghanekar	
2000	Snip	Dream Catcher	Ashutosh Phatak & Dhruv Ghanekar & Mehnaz	
		Secrecy	Ashutosh Phatak & Dhruv Ghanekar & Barbara Mendes	
1999	Shiamak Davar	Dil Chahe	Shiamak Davar (Ashu and Dhruv )	
1999	Mehnaz	Mausam	Mehnaz Ashutosh Phatak and Dhruv Ghanekar	
1998	Bombay Boys	Mumbhai	Javed Jaffry, Ashutosh Phatak & Dhruv Ghanekar	
		Paisa Paisa Paisa	Mehnaz, Ashutosh Phatak & Dhruv Ghanekar	
1997	Tamanna	Background Score	As Ashutosh Phatak & Dhruv Ghanekar	

== Awards ==
Awards	Year	Project
The One Show ( USA)	2019	Jimmy Nelson
Cannes Lion (France)	2014	Nike Parallel Journeys
D&AD ( UK )	2014, 2015,2019,2021	Nike, parallel journeys, Nike MEYC, jimmy Nelson Blink Jimmy Nelson SOS
London International Awards ( UK )	2014	Nike Parallel Journeys
Clios ( USA )	2014, 2015, 2016	Nike Parallel Journeys, Nike MEYC
Spikes Asia	2013, 2014, 2021	Nike Parallel Journeys, Nike MEYC, Samsung
Abbys ( INDIA )	2007, 2012, 2015	Reliance Rang Cha Gaye, Fevicol, Nike MEYC
AD Fest	2013, 2014, 2017	Nike Parallel Journeys, Nike MEYC, Samsung
GIMA Awards	2015, 2015	Dhruv Voyage Best Fusion Album, Dhima BEst Rock Song
Kyoorius Creative Awards	2014, 2019, 2021	Nike MEYC, Jimmy Nelson Blink, jimmy Nelson SOS
IRRA Award for Producer of the year.	2015	Dhruv Voyage
