= S. B. Mujumdar =

Indian academic

Shantaram Balwant Mujumdar
- Born: 31 July 1935 (age 90); Gadhinglaj, Kolhapur, British India
- Known for: Symbiosis Society & Symbiosis International University
- Title: Founder and president of the Symbiosis Society, chancellor of the Symbiosis International University
- Awards: Padma Bhushan, Padma Shri, Punyabhushan, Maharashtra Gaurav

Shantaram Balwant Mujumdar is the founder and president of the Symbiosis Society, a multinational educational and cultural center, and chancellor of Symbiosis International University. He was awarded the Padma Shri in 2005 and the Padma Bhushan in 2012.

Mujumdar was born on 31 July 1935 at Gadhinglaj, a Taluka in Kolhapur District in Maharashtra. He had his school education at Gadhinglaj and college education at Rajaram college, Kolhapur and Pune. In his master's degree (M.Sc.) in Botany, he stood first class first with distinction in Pune University. He obtained his Doctorate (Ph.D.) in Microbiology from Pune University.

He joined Fergusson College, Pune as Professor and Head of Department in Botany which position he held for 20 years. He was a recognized post graduate teacher and a guide for Ph.D. students. He was a member of the Pune University's Executive Council, the Senate, Academic Council (for 14 years) and Chairman of the Board of Studies in Botany (for 9 years). He was also I.C.C.R's Foreign Academic Advisor in Pune University (for 7 years). He founded Symbiosis International University in 1971 to help foreign students in Pune.

He has published over 50 original research articles in several national and international scientific journals. He has authored several books on Life Sciences and has contributed over 200 articles on Science, Education and Youth Development. He has also been the chairman of the Educational Wing of FICCI in 2005–2006.

Mujumdar is the recipient of many awards. The Government of India conferred him with the Padma Shri in 2005 and the Padma Bhushan in 2012. He has received Punyabhushan (2009), FIE Foundation Puraskar (2006), ‘Maharashtra Gaurav Puraskar’ (2003), Top Management Club Pune's “Excellence in Education” Award, the Rotary club of Pune's ‘Service Excellence Recognition Award (SERA)’, The Rotary Foundation of Rotary International Paul Harris Fellow, Giant International Life Time Achievement Award, Lion Gaurav Puraskar, Pune Municipal Corporation's ‘Roll of Honour for Life-Time Achievement’ (2006) and Pune Festival Award.

Fergusson College Alumni Association felicitated him as a Distinguished Alumnus and awarded him with 'Fergusson Gaurav Puraskar', on 13 January 2024, at the hands of Chhatrapati Shahu Maharaj (Shahu II of Kolhapur), the Chairperson of Deccan Education Society which runs the Fergusson College.

== Awards ==
- 2012, Padma Bhushan
- 2009, Punyabhushan
- 2005, Padma Shri
