= Radhika Maira Tabrez =

Indian writer and editor

Radhika Maira Tabrez is an Indian writer, editor, learning and development specialist, radio show host, and Tedx speaker.

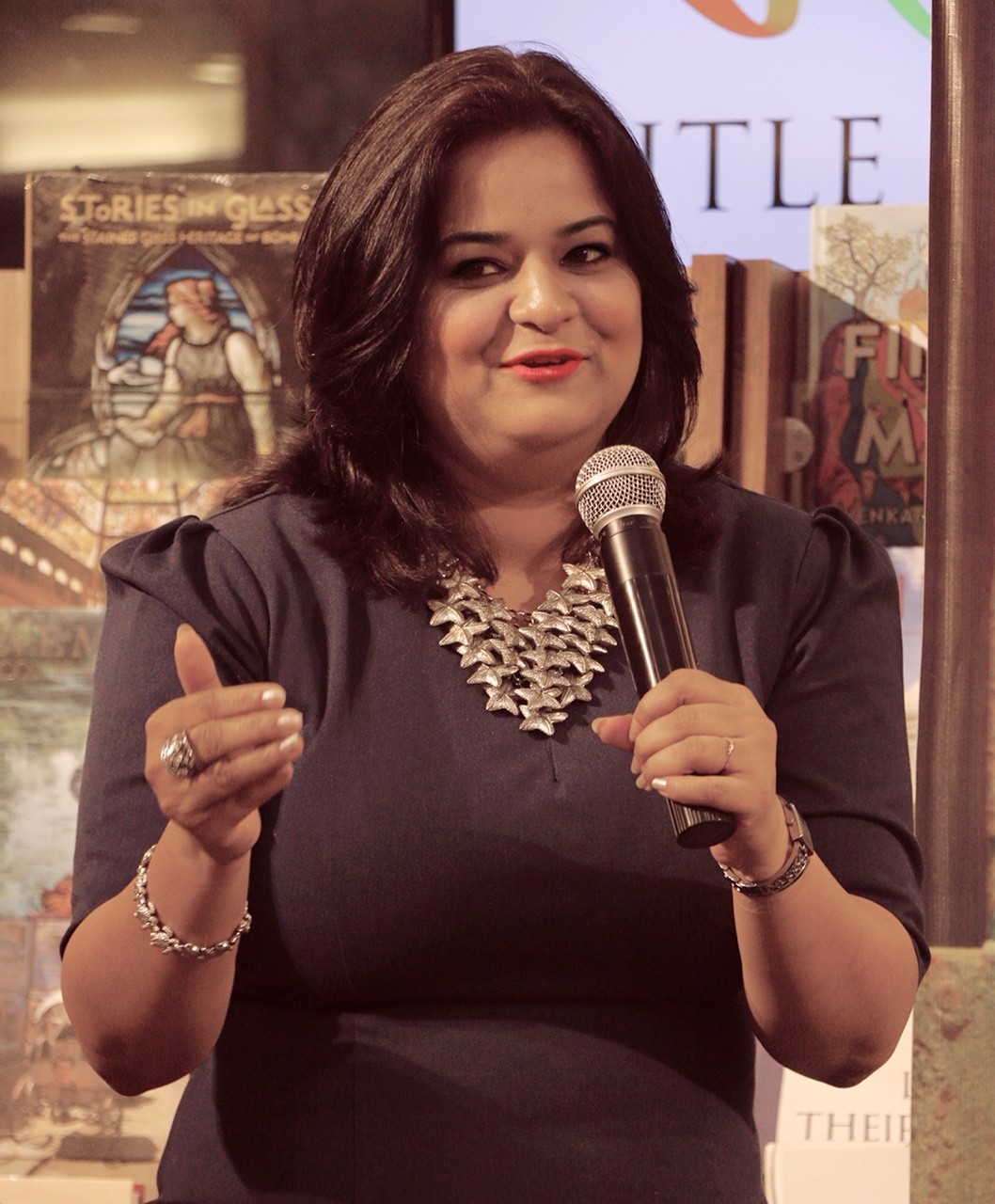
Radhika Maira Tabrez

Her debut novel In The Light Of Darkness won the much-coveted Muse India – Satish Verma Young Writer Award in 2016. Her second novella, The Emancipation of Farzana Siddiqui, was released in early 2019 to rave reviews. Radhika's stories and essays have appeared in over a dozen anthologies; the latest one being the first print edition of the other side of hope - an international collection of works by immigrants and refugees, supported by the Arts Council, UK, and the University of Leeds.

She was one of the Program Mentors for the Chevening Writers Series held in Malaysia in 2020.

Radhika holds an MBA from Symbiosis Institute of Business Management, Pune (SIBM). During her time at SIBM, she became the first and till-date (2022) the only, female to be elected as President of the Students’ Council in almost 45 years of the Institute's history. Her Learning & Development experience runs across ITeS, Telecom, Travel and Tourism, and BFSI sectors. She volunteered with Gender Security Project (erstwhile The Red Elephant Foundation). She is the founder of Roots & Wings Programme – a skill and personality enhancement program for children which conducted many life skills and soft skills learning sessions for children and young adults in NTPC Townships in India. She was also a member of the Kalam Library Project, an initiative that aims at putting a free library within the reach of the village and small-town children.

== Writing career ==
Radhika's writing journey started when some of her short stories won national-level competitions and were published in various anthologies. Some of Radhika's works have been published in 'UnBound - an eMagazine', Sankarak, Defiant Dreams, When They Spoke, Mock Stock and Quarrel, Parenting In The Times Of Pandemic, and the other side of hope.

She has been a speaker, panelist, and moderator at many literary festivals including Hyderabad Literary Festival (2016), Dhaka Literature Festival (2017), Georgetown Literature Festival (2020), and Ananke's Women Literature Festival (2021 and 2022) among many others. She has conducted guest lectures for Sophia College (Mumbai), Lady Shri Ram College for Women (Delhi), SIBM (Pune), SIBM (Bangalore) and SIBM (Hyderabad).

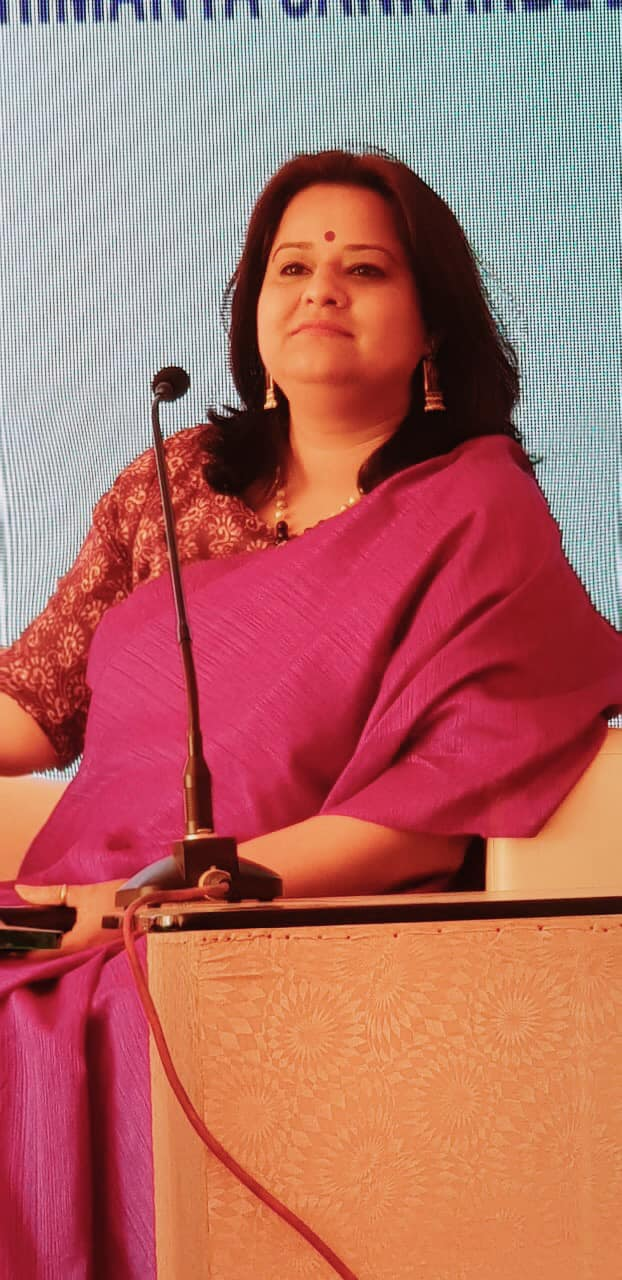
Radhika Maira Tabrez

== Awards and recognition ==
In 2018, she became the first Indian ever to speak at a TEDx event in Bangladesh. She won the Rising Stars India Award (2017), and 100 Most Inspiring Writers by Indian Awaaz (2018).

== Current Engagements ==
Radhika works for the prestigious Western Canada Theatre, in Kamloops. She hosts a weekly show on CFBX (the alternative radio station of Kamloops), called New In The Loops, focusing on new immigrant experiences in Kamloops in particular, and in Canada in general. She was commissioned as an influencer by Tourism Kamloops, to write a series of blog articles for their website, highlighting Kamloops as a destination of choice for potential immigrants to Canada. She also volunteers for the Kamloops Festival of Performing Arts.

== Family ==
After short stints in Dhaka (Bangladesh), and Penang (Malaysia), Radhika and her family are now building a new home and life in sunny Kamloops in British Columbia, Canada.
