= Manan Bhardwaj =

Indian singer and composer

- Born: 19 October 1987 (age 38); Gurgaon, Haryana, India
- Origin: Gurgaon, India
- Genres: Filmi; film score; pop; Hindustani classical music
- Occupations: Singer; composer; record producer; lyricist
- Instruments: Vocals; harmonium; tabla; keyboard; electric guitar; acoustic guitar; violin
- Years active: 2010–present
- Label: T-Series

Manan Bhardwaj is an Indian singer-songwriter and music composer who is primarily known for his works in the Bollywood music industry. He has also made songs in Punjabi and Haryanvi languages.

Bhardwaj is best known for the songs "Chitta", "Teri Aankhon Mein", "Shiddat – Title Track", "Dhokha", "Main Ishq Mein Hoon" and "Arjan Vailly". He gained recognition with the music album of Shiddat (2021) and earned further fame and recognition with the music albums of Radhe Shyam (2022), Satyaprem Ki Katha, Yaariyan 2 and Animal (2023). He is signed on by T-Series.

== Early life ==
Manan Bhardwaj was born in a Brahmin family on 19 October 1987 in Gurgaon, Haryana. When he was just 4–5 years old, he used to compose poems and sing them out in his class. Sometimes he recited them. By the time he was in the 8th class, he had decided that he will pursue music as a career. He felt that music would be the best career for him. In an interview he said that his hard work in the early years was accompanied by sleepless nights, travelling to work by foot and stay in a small room. He also mentioned that he idolises AR Rahman and Jagjit Singh.

== Career ==
In 2020 he gave music for Sachet Tandon's "Kandhe Ka Woh Til". The same year, he composed the song "Veham" for Armaan Malik and "Teri Aankhon Mein" for Darshan Raval and Neha Kakkar. He used to release covers of various songs and some new songs on his YouTube channel until in 2021, he recreated "Pehle Pyaar Ka Pehla Gham" sung by Jubin Nautiyal and Tulsi Kumar. Bhardwaj got his break in Bollywood with the movie Shiddat .

In 2022 he composed the song "Dhokha" in the voice of Arijit Singh. The same year he composed 3 songs: "Main Ishq Mein Hoon", "Ye Ishq Na Ho" and "Main Ishq Mein Hoon (Reprise)" in the Hindi version of the film Radhe Shyam. He also released his music video "Duaa". The same year he was the music director for the movies HIT: The First Case and Tara Vs Bilal. In 2023, Bhardwaj released "Never Together" and "Back To College". He also sang and composed the song "Aaj Ke Baad" with Tulsi Kumar from the movie Satyaprem Ki Katha From Yaariyan 2 he composed and penned 8 songs including "Saure Ghar", "Simroon Tera Naam", "Oonchi Oonchi Deewarein" and "Bewafaa Tu". He composed "Arjan Vailly" and "Kashmir" from Animal.

== Discography ==
=== Film music ===
Key
†	Denotes films that have not yet been released

- All songs are from Hindi language Bollywood films, Unless otherwise mentioned.

Year	Film	Song	Lyrics	Singer(s)	Note
2021	Shiddat	"Shiddat – Title Track"	Manan Bhardwaj	Manan Bhardwaj	
2021	Shiddat	"Shiddat (Reprise)"	Manan Bhardwaj	Manan Bhardwaj	
2021	Shiddat	"Shiddat (Reloaded)"	Manan Bhardwaj	Manan Bhardwaj	
2021	Shiddat	"Shiddat (Female)"	Manan Bhardwaj	Yohani	
2021	Shiddat	"Akhiyan Udeek Diyan"	Khawaja Pervaiz, Manan Bhardwaj	Master Saleem	Remake; Along with Nusrat Fateh Ali Khan
2021	Shiddat	"Chitta"	Manan Bhardwaj, Traditional	Manan Bhardwaj	Remake
2022	Radhe Shyam	"Main Ishq Mein Hoon"	Kumaar	Manan Bhardwaj, Harjot Kaur	
2022	Radhe Shyam	"Ye Ishq Na Ho"	Kumaar	Manan Bhardwaj, Harjot Kaur	
2022	Radhe Shyam	"Main Ishq Mein Hoon (Reprise)"	Manan Bhardwaj	Manan Bhardwaj	
2022	HIT: The First Case	"Tinka"	Manan Bhardwaj	Jubin Nautiyal	
2022	HIT: The First Case	"Kahani Baaki Hai"	Manan Bhardwaj	Divya Kumar	
2022	Tara Vs Bilal	"Teri Ho Gayi"	Manan Bhardwaj	Master Saleem, Faridkot	Full album
2022	Tara Vs Bilal	"Nichod Dunga"	Manan Bhardwaj	Manan Bhardwaj	Full album
2022	Tara Vs Bilal	"Saiyaan Ji"	Manan Bhardwaj	Manan Bhardwaj, Romy	Full album
2022	Tara Vs Bilal	"Sau Rab Di"	Manan Bhardwaj	Jubin Nautiyal, Manan Bhardwaj, Purvashi Grover	Full album
2023	Satyaprem Ki Katha	"Aaj Ke Baad"	Manan Bhardwaj	Manan Bhardwaj, Tulsi Kumar	
2023	Satyaprem Ki Katha	"Aaj Ke Baad (Reprise)"	Manan Bhardwaj	Manan Bhardwaj, Himani Kapoor	
2023	Yaariyan 2	"Saure Ghar"	Manan Bhardwaj	Vishal Mishra, Neeti Mohan, Manan Bhardwaj	
2023	Yaariyan 2	"Oonchi Oonchi Deewarein"	Manan Bhardwaj	Arijit Singh	
2023	Yaariyan 2	"Suit Patiwala"	Manan Bhardwaj	Guru Randhawa, Neha Kakkar, Manan Bhardwaj	
2023	Yaariyan 2	"Heer Bhi Royi"	Manan Bhardwaj	Prampara Tandon	
2023	Yaariyan 2	"Peene De"	Manan Bhardwaj	Master Saleem, Millind Gaba	
2023	Yaariyan 2	"Simroon Tera Naam"	Nusrat Fateh Ali Khan, Manan Bhardwaj	Sachet Tandon	Remake; Along with Nusrat Fateh Ali Khan
2023	Yaariyan 2	"Bewafaa Tu"	Manan Bhardwaj, Rahim Shah, Shamsul Hasan Shams	Jubin Nautiyal	
2023	Yaariyan 2	"Kho Sa Gaya Hoon"	Manan Bhardwaj, Yo Yo Honey Singh	Yo Yo Honey Singh, Manan Bhardwaj, Neha Kakkar	Along with Yo Yo Honey Singh
2023	Animal	"Arjan Vailly"	Bhupinder Babbal	Bhupinder Babbal, Sandeep Brar	Along with Bhupinder Babbal
2023	Animal	"Kashmir"	Manan Bhardwaj	Shreya Ghoshal, Manan Bhardwaj	
2023	Animal	"Kashmeeru"	Anantha Sriram	Shreya Ghoshal, Yazin Nizar	Telugu Dubbed Song
2023	Animal	"Theeraadha"	Mohan Rajan	Shreya Ghoshal, Yazin Nizar	Tamil Dubbed Song
2023	Animal	"Kashmirin Saanu"	Mankombu Gopalakrishnan	Sithara Krishnakumar, Yazin Nizar	Malayalam Dubbed Song
2023	Animal	"Kaashmira Thaana"	Varadaraj Chikkaballapura	Sithara Krishnakumar, Yazin Nizar	Kannada Dubbed Song
2023	Starfish	"Madhaniyan"	Manan Bhardwaj	Manan Bhardwaj	
2023	Starfish	"Yaad Ban Gaye"	Manan Bhardwaj	Tulsi Kumar, Manan Bhardwaj	
2024	Vedaa	"Mummy Ji"	Manan Bhardwaj	Himani Kapoor, Prajakta Shukre	First project without T-Series
2024	The Family Star	"Dekho Re Dekho"	Rashmi Virag	Manan Bhardwaj	Hindi Dubbed Song composed by Gopi Sundar
2025	Crazxy	"Paapi"	Manan Bhardwaj, Khullar G	Romy	
2025	Crazxy	"Paapi 2.0"	Manan Bhardwaj, Khullar G	Romy	
2025	The Diplomat	"Bharat"	Manoj Muntashir	Hariharan, Prajakta Shukre, Himani Kapoor, Natraj Kshericha, Swapnomoy Chowdhury, Kamal Bharti	Along with A. R. Rahman
2025	Nishaanchi	"Neend Bhi Teri"	Manan Bhardwaj	Manan Bhardwaj	
2025	Nishaanchi	"Bhaga Bhaga Ke Maarenge"	Manan Bhardwaj	Manan Bhardwaj	
2025	Nishaanchi	"Reh Gaye Akele"	Manan Bhardwaj	Manan Bhardwaj	
2025	Nishaanchi	"Neend Bhi Teri (Film Version)"	Manan Bhardwaj	Aaishvary Thackeray	
2025	Nishaanchi	"Jhule Jhule Paalna"	Manan Bhardwaj	Manan Bhardwaj, Prajakta Shukre, Himani Kapoor	
2025	Nishaanchi	"Soja"	Manan Bhardwaj	Vandana Sinha, Prajakta Sukre	
2025	Nishaanchi 2	"Zeher Thookti Rehti Hun"	Manan Bhardwaj	Manan Bhardwaj	
2025	Nishaanchi 2	"Aisa Thag Ke Gaya"	Manan Bhardwaj	Manan Bhardwaj	
2025	Nishaanchi 2	"Sadhe Saati"	Manan Bhardwaj	Manoj Tiwari	
2025	Nishaanchi 2	"Wonderland"	Manan Bhardwaj	Prajakta Shukre, Manan Bhardwaj	
2025	Saali Mohabbat	"Pahadon Wali"	Manan Bhardwaj		
2025	Saali Mohabbat	"Hara Re Chanda"	Manan Bhardwaj		

=== Non-film music ===
Year	Song	Music	Lyrics	Singer(s)	Note
2016	Dariya	Manan Bhardwaj	Manan Bhardwaj	Rajat Deepek	
2016	Lamborghini	Manan Bhardwaj	Manan Bhardwaj	Rajat Deepek	
2020	Kandhe Ka Woh Til	Manan Bhardwaj	Kumaar	Sachet Tandon	
2020	Veham	Manan Bhardwaj	Rashmi Virag	Armaan Malik	
2020	Teri Aankhon Mein	Manan Bhardwaj	Kumaar	Darshan Raval Neha Kakkar	
2021	Je Main Kehna	Manan Bhardwaj	Daljit Chitti	Bhavdeep Romana	
2021	Pehle Pyaar Ka Pehla Gham	Rajesh Roshan Manan Bhardwaj	Javed Akhtar Rashmi Virag	Tulsi Kumar Jubin Nautiyal	Remake
2021	Aise Na Chhoro	Manan Bhardwaj	Rashmi Virag	Guru Randhawa	
2021	Tera Naam	Manan Bhardwaj	Manan Bhardwaj	Darshan Raval Tulsi Kumar	
2022	Dhokha	Manan Bhardwaj	Manan Bhardwaj	Arijit Singh	
2022	Kamaal Ho Gea	Satinder Sartaj Manan Bhardwaj	Satinder Sartaj	Satinder Sartaj Irwinmeet	
2022	Jo Mujhe Deewana Kar De	Manan Bhardwaj	Manan Bhardwaj	Tulsi Kumar, Manan Bhardwaj	
2022	Dua	Manan Bhardwaj	Manan Bhardwaj	Manan Bhardwaj	
2023	Never Together	Manan Bhardwaj	Manan Bhardwaj	Manan Bhardwaj	
2023	Back To College	Manan Bhardwaj	Manan Bhardwaj	Manan Bhardwaj	
2024	Laa Pila De Sharaab	Manan Bhardwaj	Manan Bhardwaj	Vishal Mishra	
2024	Khaali Botal	Manan Bhardwaj	Manan Bhardwaj	Parampara Tandon	
2025	Chasing Stormrider	Manan Bhardwaj, Amrita Sen	Amrit Mann, Amrita Sen, Robin Grubert	Jacqueline Fernandez, Bhupinder Babbal	
2025	Sahilon Ki Hawa	Manan Bhardwaj			

== Awards and nominations ==
Year	Award	Category	Song	Film	Music	Lyrics	Singer(s)	Result	Ref.
2023	Mirchi Music Awards	Listener's Choice – Indie Song of the Year	Dhokha	—N/a	Manan Bhardwaj	Manan Bhardwaj	Arijit Singh	Pending	
2024	Mirchi Music Awards	Upcoming Lyricist of The Year	Kashmir	Animal	Manan Bhardwaj	Manan Bhardwaj	Manan Bhardwaj, Shreya Ghosal	Won	

Year	Award	Category	Film	Result
2024	Filmfare Awards	Filmfare Award for Best Music Director (with Pritam, Vishal Mishra, Harshavardhan Rameshwar, Shreyas Puranik, Ashim Kemson, Bhupinder Babbal, Jaani)	Animal	Won
