= Vedika Pinto =

Indian actress (born 1995)

Vedika Pinto (born 14 October 1995) is an Indian actress. Her first film was the Bollywood thriller Operation Romeo. She then starred in Gumraah, a remake of Thadam opposite Aditya Roy Kapur. In 2026, she starred in Netflix's show Musafir Cafe alongside Vikrant Massey. She is from Mangluru.

== Filmography ==
- All films are in Hindi, otherwise noted

Year	Title	Role	Director	Producer
2022	Operation Romeo	Neha Kasliwal	Shashant Shah	Neeraj Pandey; Shital Bhatia
2023	Gumraah	Jahnvi Behl	Vardhan Ketkar	Bhushan Kumar; Krishan Kumar; Anjum Ketani
2025	Nishaanchi	Rangeeli Rinku	Anurag Kashyap	Ajay Rai; Ranjan Singh
2025	Nishaanchi Part 2	Rangeeli Rinku	Anurag Kashyap	Ajay Rai; Ranjan Singh

== Television ==
Year	Title	Role	Director	Producer
2026	Musafir Cafe	Sudha Tripathi	Ruchir Arun	Anuj Gosalia Vijay Subramaniam

== Music video ==
Year	Title	Role	Director	Producer
2019	Liggi	Liggi	Ritviz	Ritviz
2022	Bas Tujhse Pyaar Ho	Traveller	Armaan Malik	T-Series
