= Meraj Shaikh =

Indian film producer (born 1977)

- Born: 28 August 1977 (age 48); Mumbai, India
- Occupation: Producer / Executive Producer

Meraj Shaikh is an Indian film producer and Line Producer and the founder of Wingman Pictures, He was born in Mumbai, Maharashtra in 1977.

== Career ==
Meraj Shaikh began his career in Bollywood in 2001 as Production Manager with the movie Kasoor directed by Vikram Bhatt. Then he worked on Ek Din 24 Ghante, directed by Anant Balani starring Rahul Bose & Nandita Das. Later in 2004, he was given the Big Banner movie Black directed by Sanjay Leela Bhansali, starring Amitabh Bachchan & Rani Mukherjee. The film was critically acclaimed and won major awards in all categories.

After the success of Black, he was offered the movie Mumbai Cutting as an Executive Producer, comprising eleven short films, directed by a host of eleven national award-winning Directors such as Sudhir Mishra, Kundan Shah, Rahul Dholakia, Anurag Kashyap, Revathi, Jahnu Barua, Rituparno Ghosh, Shashank Ghosh, Ruchi Narayan, Ayush Raina, and Manish Jha.

Meraj was Executive Producer for the movie Once Upon a Time in Mumbaai starring Ajay Devgn, Emraan Hashmi & Kangana Ranaut, an Indian period gangster film based on Haji Mastan, directed by Milan Luthria and produced by Balaji Motion Pictures. He was also associated with an NFDC film An Image in the Water as Line Producer. Meraj was associated with Shaitaan produced by Anurag Kashyap Films & Viacom 18, directed by Bejoy Nambiar, who won the Most Promising Debut Director Award by Screen Weekly Award. Then he joined the team of Gangs of Wasseypur directed by Anurag Kashyap, screened at Cannes Film Festival. He continued with Aiyyaa as Associate Producer starring Rani Mukherjee. The next film, Peddlers, which was screened as part of Critics' Week, an independent film event which runs parallel to the Cannes film festival in southern France. Then Monsoon Shootout as an Associate producer, directed by Amit Kumar, Produced by Trevor Ingman & Martijn De Grunt (London). He had also been associated with The Lunchbox starring Irrfan Khan, directed by Ritesh Batra, the film has won 11 Awards and 13 nominations globally. Following Bombay Talkies directed by four renowned directors Karan Johar, Anurag Kashyap, Dibakar Banerjee and Zoya Akhtar.

He was also associated with the film Mickey Virus a Hindi comedy thriller with DAR Motion Pictures, Poorna: Courage Has No Limit with Rahul Bose, Film Omerta with Hansal Mehta & Rajkumar Rao, FilmMission Majnu with Siddharth Malhotra & Rashmika Mandana.

=== International films ===
Meraj’s journey took off scoring international movies like Trishna as India’s line producer, starring Freida Pinto and Riz Ahmed, Directed by Michael Winterbottom ("The Mighty Heart" fame). He is associated with film White Lies starring Emraan Hashmi, Directed by Danis Tanović (Director of the Oscar-winning film No Man’s Land). And Canadian film Khoya as an Associate Producer, directed by Sami Khan (Canada).

=== Formation of WINGMAN PICTURES PVT. LTD. ===
Meraj Shaikh started his independent production house Wingman Pictures Pvt. Ltd in the year 2007. Wingman Pictures is a production company ready to bring fresh and innovative thinking in the field of new media in Hindi Films Industry. Wingman Pictures Pvt. Ltd. services encompass Ad Films, Short Films, Overseas Movies Distribution, Music Rights Acquisition.

== Filmography ==
- Mission Majnu (2023)
- Masala Steps (2020)
- What Could Be The Name Of The Story? (2019)
- Omerta (2017)
- Khoya (Canadian Film) (2015)
- Poorna: Courage Has No Limit (2015)
- White Lies (2013)
- Mickey Virus (2013)
- Bombay Talkies (2013)
- Maazii (2013)
- The Lunchbox (Dabba) (2013)
- Monsoon Shootout (2013)
- Chakshoo (2013)
- Aiyyaa (2012)
- Gangs of Wasseypur - Part 1 (2012)
- Gangs of Wasseypur - Part 2 (2012)
- Peddlers (2012)
- Bijuka (2012)
- Trishna (2011) Director: Michael Winterbottom
- Shaitan (2011)
- Mumbai Cutting (2011)
- Once Upon a Time in Mumbaai (2010)
- Mr Bhatti On Chutti (2010)
- Maregaa Saala Devang Dholakia 2009
- Black (2005) Director: Sanjay Leela Bhansali
- Ek din 24 ghante (2003) Director: Anant Balani
- Soch (2002)
