= DAR Motion Pictures =

Indian film production and distribution company

- Company type: Subsidiary
- Industry: Film production, Film distribution
- Founded: 2009
- Headquarters: Mumbai, India
- Key people: Arun Rangachari; Vivek Rangachari; Sethumadhavan Napan
- Products: Films
- Website: www.darproductionhouse.com

DAR Motion Pictures (DAR), a wholly owned subsidiary of DAR Capital Group, is an Indian film production and distribution company headquartered out of Mumbai. Known for its focus on content driven cinema, DAR Motion Pictures has worked with a variety of film directors and companies, including Ritesh Batra, Nikhil Advani, Anurag Kashyap, Sikhya Entertainment amongst others. Apart from its investments in iRock Media, DAR has also focused immensely on innovation and the adoption of modern technology, creating Haunted 3D, India's first stereoscopic 3D horror film. Further, the movies credited to DAR clearly indicate a tilt towards, content and subject driven cinema. Films like City of Gold, D-Day and The Lunchbox are stark examples of that.

Amongst the most talked about and appreciated films of 2013, ‘The Lunchbox’ was not just an unprecedented success story domestically but also received phenomenal international acclaim. A Sundance script ‘The Lunchbox’ was showcased at Cannes and The Dubai International Film Festival, amongst many others. It was bestowed with the Best Screenplay and Jury Grand Prize at the Asia Pacific Screen Awards 2013.

Dar Motion Pictures is a Bollywood production house that produces both Hindi and regional cinema. Opening with the hard hitting and riveting Lalbaug Parel (Marathi) & City of Gold (2010 film)(Hindi), DAR moved on to produce many Marathi and Hindi films including and Teecha Baap Tyacha Baap (Marathi), Haunted 3D, D-Day, Mickey Virus, Peddlers, Monsoon Shootout and The Lunchbox. Further through its distribution arm, ‘DAR Film Distributors’, it has been behind the distribution of two Hollywood films in India namely, ‘The Dark Knight Rises’ and ‘Fast & Furious 6’, and released Girish Malik's ‘Jal’ which was the only Indian film in competition at the Busan Internationalm Film Festival 2013. Among other Marathi films that DAR Film Distributors have distributed are Dhag, Postcard and Cappuccino.

== History ==
Continuing in the tradition of creating new content beyond the language barrier, DAR has given Marathi cinema its first superhero film ‘Baji’ starring Shreyas Talpade and Amruta Khanvilkar. 2017 saw the release of 2 films from the house of DAR, namely 'Haraamkhor' & 'Monsoon Shootout'. The production house's most recent Marathi release is the much talked about Bucket List, which is directed by Tejas Vijay Deoskar and bears the distinction of being the first ever Marathi film to feature the one & only Madhuri Dixit. The film had a wide release on 25 May 2018. DAR's only release in 2019 has been acclaimed director Ritesh Batra's Photograph (film) which features Nawazuddin Siddiqui and Sanya Malhotra.

== Way forward ==
The company also has various other projects under development currently including a remake of the Malayalam movie Bangalore Days and a biopic on Arunima Sinha - a national level volleyball player who was pushed from a running train by some robbers in 2011, before going on to become the first female amputee to climb Mount Everest. DAR has also recently forayed into the digital space, is currently in the process of setting up both web-series and original films for the leading OTT/digital platforms. In 2020, DAR officially entered films production in the Southern Indian languages.

== Key people ==
The management team at DAR consists of the founders Arun Rangachari (also the chairman) and Vivek Rangachari, along with their COO, Sethumadhavan Napan.

== Filmography ==
=== Films produced ===
Year	Film	Director	Notes
2010	City of Gold (Lalbaug Parel) in Marathi	Mahesh Manjrekar	Adapted from Jayant Pawar's Marathi play, Adhantar. Released in Hindi and Marathi languages
2011	Teecha Baap Tyacha Baap	Atul Kale	Marathi film
2011	Haunted – 3D	Vikram Bhatt	First Indian stereoscopic 3D horror film.
2012	Dangerous Ishhq	Vikram Bhatt	
2013	D-Day	Nikhil Advani	
2013	Mickey Virus	Saurabh Varma	Debut film of Swedish Greek actress Elli Avram.
2013	The Lunchbox	Ritesh Batra	
2013	Ugly	Anurag Kashyap	
2015	Baji	Nikhil Mahajan	First Indian Superhero movie in Marathi Cinema
2017	Monsoon Shootout	Amit Kumar	
2017	Haraamkhor	Shlok Sharma	
2018	Bucket List	Tejas Prabha Vijay Deoskar	Debut Marathi film of Bollywood actress Madhuri Dixit
2019	Photograph	Ritesh Batra	

=== Films distributed ===
Year	Film	Director	Production Company	Notes
2012	The Dark Knight Rises	Christopher Nolan	Warner Bros. Pictures; DC Entertainment; Legendary Entertainment; Syncopy	Based on the DC Comics character Batman final installment in Nolan's The Dark Knight trilogy, and the sequel to The Dark Knight, Indian Distribution only
2012	Sons of Ram	Kushal Ruia	ACK Animation Studios; Maya Digital Studios; Cartoon Network India	Based on The Sons of Ramaby Anant Pai, Ram Waeerkar
2013	Fast & Furious 6	Justin Lin	Original Film; One Race Films; Dentsu	It is the sequel to Fast Five (2011) and the sixth installment in the Fast & Furious franchise, Indian Distribution only.
2014	Jal	Girish Malik	DAR Motion Pictures	
2014	Dhag	Shivaji Lotan Patil	Sri Pant Production	* National Film Awards - 60th National Film Awards: Best Director - Shivaji Lotan Patil; Best Actress - Usha Jadhav; Special Jury mention - Hansraj Jagtap; Maharashtra Times Sanmaan Awards; Best Director (film) - Shivaji Lotan Patil; Best Actress (film) - Usha Jadhav; Best Supporting Actor (film) - Upendra Limaye; Best Child Actor (film) - Hansraj Jagtap; Best Screenplay - Nitin Dixit
2014	Postcard	Gajendra Ahire	DAR Motion Pictures	Marathi film
2014	Cappuccino	Shivdarshan Kadam	SD Motion Pictures	
