= Udta Teer =

2026 Indian film by Aakash Kaushik

- Theatrical release poster
- Directed by: Aakash Kaushik
- Written by: Aakash Kaushik
- Produced by: Karan Johar; Adar Poonawalla; Guneet Monga; Apoorva Mehta; Achin Jain
- Starring: Ayushmann Khurrana; Sara Ali Khan; Mukul Dev; Gulshan Grover; Ram Kapoor; Rahul Bose
- Cinematography: Harshvir Oberai
- Edited by: Prerna Saigal
- Music by: Songs: Sachin–Jigar; Score: Ketan Sodha
- Production companies: Dharma Productions; Sikhya Entertainment
- Distributed by: Dharma Productions
- Release date: 23 October 2026
- Running time: 134 minutes
- Country: India
- Language: Hindi
- Budget: est. 50–65 crore
- Box office: ₹65.18 crore

Udta Teer (lit. 'Flying arrow'; transl. Trouble) is a 2026 Indian Hindi-language spy comedy film directed and written by Aakash Kaushik in his directorial debut and produced by Karan Johar, Adar Poonawalla, Guneet Monga, Apoorva Mehta and Achin Jain under Dharma Productions and Sikhya Entertainment. The film stars Ayushmann Khurrana and Sara Ali Khan in the lead roles, with Rahul Bose, Ram Kapoor, Gulshan Grover, Mukul Dev, Suhail Nayyar, Supriya Pilgaonkar, Brijendra Kala and Sandeep Anand in supporting roles. It is the second posthumous appearance of Mukul Dev, following his passing in 2025.

The film was released theatrically on 23 October 2026. The film received mixed reviews from critics.

== Plot ==
Vikrant Thapar works for the CTS squad who keep an eye on terrorist activities being planned against India. In reality Vikrant is an undercover Pakistani spy sending secret information to his country to General Mir and Niyazi. He is not the only one but his fellow officer and friend Ashfaque and servant Tariq also operate with him. CTS chief Burman gets suspicious about Vikrant and Ashfaque and during a scuffle their car meets with accident. Burman is left in comatose state while Vikrant looses his memory. After Vikrant recovers and joins his duty he manages to break all secret networks of Pakistan in India and his mission is to catch Bilal. But due to memory loss he isn't aware that he himself is Bilal.

== Cast ==
- Ayushmann Khurrana as Bilal Ahmad / Vikrant Thapar
- Sara Ali Khan as Yamini Thapar
- Mukul Dev as Azhar Maqsood (based on Masood Azhar)
- Gulshan Grover as General Mir (based on Asim Munir)
- Ram Kapoor as A. Q. Niyazi
- Rahul Bose as M. D. Burman
- Brijendra Kala as K. K. Shrivastav
- Suhail Nayyar as Dhruv / Ashfaq Khan
- Supriya Pilgaonkar as Yamini's mother
- Sandeep Anand as Shambhu / Tariq
- Raghubir Yadav as Imam
- Smita Tambe as Holkar
- Bhuvan Chopra as Vikrant's father

== Production ==
In April 2024, it was reported that Ayushmann Khurrana would appear in a spy comedy film produced by Karan Johar and Guneet Monga under their respective banners, Dharma Productions and Sikhya Entertainment. The two production companies had previously collaborated on projects such as The Lunchbox (2013), Kill (2023) and Gyaarah Gyaarah (2024).

== Soundtrack ==
Udta Teer

Soundtrack album by Sachin–Jigar
- Released: 16 October 2026
- Genre: Feature film soundtrack
- Length: 16:23
- Language: Hindi
- Label: Sony Music India
- Producer: Sachin–Jigar

Sachin–Jigar chronology
Chand Mera Dil (2026)	Udta Teer (2026)	King (2026)
External audio
- Udta Teer – Official Audio Jukebox on YouTube

The film's music was composed by Sachin–Jigar, with lyrics by Amitabh Bhattacharya. Azeem Dayani served as music supervisor. The first single from the soundtrack was "Bhootni Ka", performed by Kaka, Twinkle Aggarwal and Amitabh Bhattacharya. The song was released on 29 September 2026 through Sony Music India. The second single, "Choozay", performed by Emiway Bantai and Jigar Saraiya, was released on 3 October 2026.

Track listing
No.	Title	Singer(s)	Length
1.	"Choozay"	Jigar Saraiya, Emiway Bantai	3:25
2.	"Chann"	Arijit Singh	3:37
3.	"Udta Teer (Title Track)"	Raghav Chaitanya, Simran Choudhary	2:36
4.	"Bhootni Ka"	Kaka, Twinkle Aggrwal, Amitabh Bhattacharya	3:33
5.	"Jai Hind"	Siddharth Mahadevan, Shivam Mahadevan	3:12
Total length:			16:23

== Marketing ==
The first trailer for the film was released on 23 September 2026. A second trailer was released on 13 October 2026.

On 21 October 2026, Ayushmann Khurrana and Sara Ali Khan visited the Attari–Wagah border to promote the film, where they attended the Beating Retreat ceremony and interacted with the crowd.

== Release ==
=== Theatrical ===
The film was initially scheduled to be released theatrically on 11 September 2026. In August 2026, the new release date was announced to be 9 October 2026, before it was moved further to 23 October 2026.

On 16 October 2026, Nepal's Central Film Censor Board banned the film from screening in the country citing diplomatic relations with Pakistan.

=== Certification ===
Before its theatrical release, the film underwent modifications following review by India's Central Board of Film Certification (CBFC). Among the reported changes was the removal of a shot depicting blood on a map of India. The film was subsequently granted a U/A 13+ certificate.

== Reception ==
=== Box office ===
Udta Teer grossed ₹57.18 crore (US$6.1 million) worldwide. It grossed ₹49.39 crore (US$5.3 million) in India and ₹7.79 crore (US$830,000) in overseas market.

On its opening day, the film earned ₹3.89 crore net at the domestic box office.

=== Critical response ===
On the review aggregator website Rotten Tomatoes, 46% of 13 critics' reviews are positive, with an average rating of 6.4/10.

Rishabh Suri of Hindustan Times gave the film 3.5 stars out of 5 and concluded, "Udta Teer is the kind of comedy that makes you wish filmmakers would trust good writing a little more often. Its first half delivers the laughs without resorting to cheap tricks, and its cast is more than happy to play along with the madness. The second half could have held on to that for longer, but the film still leaves a good impression. Bilal's loyalties may be all over the place, but the film's intentions are clear: to entertain without insulting the audience's intelligence." Devesh Sharma of Filmfare gave the film 3.5 stars out of 5 as well, noting, "The film's biggest strength is its willingness to poke fun at the conventions of spy cinema." Being highly appreciative of Khurrana, he wrote, "His comic timing is impeccable, and he handles Bilal's transformation into an unwitting Indian patriot with just the right mix of conviction and bewilderment." He called Bose, "another major asset." For the second half of the film, he critiqued, "The second half introduces too many twists and turns, shifting the emphasis towards suspense, intrigue and the mechanics of the spy thriller." Arfa Javaid of ABP Live, too, gave the film 3 stars out of 5. She pointed out, "Khan is the weak link, though not through any fault of her own. Yamini is written as an appendage, and the marriage track never gets enough substance to matter." She concluded in her review, "Udta Teer is predictable, but it’s never boring. The laughs come steadily, the dialogues are sharp, and the songs are put to clever use. The second half loses some of the madness, yet the film still leaves you smiling long after the credits roll." Likewise, Mayank Shekhar of Mid-Day gave the film 3 stars out of 5. He wrote, "It felt as if they didn't trust the comedy long enough. By then, I'd had more than my fair share of laughs, though. So not exactly complaining — just felt Kunal Kemmu's Vibe (2026), in the same genre, was slightly better, but that comparison is a compliment too." Saibal Chatterjee of NDTV gave the film 2.5 stars out of 5 and noted, "In the era of Dhurandhar, Udta Teer aspires to be Austin Powers. That is a big ask for a movie that treats a genre as a plaything that it has little control over." Having praise for Khurrana's portrayal, he wrote, "Khurrana, whose career is dotted with screen roles designed for flowing against the tide, sinks into the skin of a man who is the very antithesis of a big-screen secret agent. As a man who cannot tell the difference between the real and the imagined, he delivers a performance that holds the film together."

Sukanya Verma of Rediff.com also gave the film 2.5 stars out of 5 and concluded in her review, "Despite Ayushmann's sharp presence making the most of his foggily written part pulling through extremes of fun and ferocity, Udta Teer misses the bullseye by a mile. Watching its refreshingly cheeky ambition dumb down into a grovelling piece of gutless filmmaking is supremely disappointing." Rahul Desai of The Hollywood Reporter India observed, "A decade ago, this might have been a playful send-up of a thriller like Raazi. But today it’s an agitated tribute to the low-hanging fruits of tricolour trees. Gone are the days of Tere Bin Laden, Happy Bhag Jayegi, or even Bangistan. Satire is no longer the sibling of dissent; it’s the stepchild of compliance." Shubhra Gupta of The Indian Express gave the film 2 stars out of 5, summing up in her review, "this film is neither fish nor fowl, neither Gadar nor Pathaan, but a tedious mix of spoof and sentiment which gets into its stride only sporadically." Nandini Ramnath of Scroll.in pointed out, "Mockery as a form of revenge against an adversary is the film’s most consistent idea. The contempt for all things Pakistani is indistinguishable from many things Muslim, including the act of praying and the ability to read Urdu. The singer Nusrat Fateh Ali Khan is reduced to a Pakistani, his cherished qawaal [sic] Dum Mast Qalandar Mast played over a shootout." Aishani Biswas of Outlook gave the film 1.5 stars out of 5. She observed, "National identity is inherited, taught and performed, but it is also shaped by relationships, memory and lived experience. What happens when those things come into conflict? Could someone discover a shared humanity across a border without abandoning the complicated loyalties that define them?" She further noted, "Instead, Udta Teer repeatedly reaches for the easiest joke or the loudest patriotic gesture. It has the outline of a film about how national loyalty is constructed, but little patience for examining that construction. What could have been a provocative spy comedy becomes a noisy collection of political references and comic set-pieces. The result is a film that asks a worthwhile question but does not stay with it long enough to understand what it means."
