= Monsoon Shootout =

2013 film written and directed by Amit Kumar

- Film Poster
- Directed by: Amit Kumar
- Written by: Amit Kumar
- Produced by: Guneet Monga; Trevor Ingman; Martijn de Grunt; Shahnaab Alam; Meraj Shaikh
- Starring: Nawazuddin Siddiqui; Vijay Varma; Tannishtha Chatterjee; Neeraj Kabi; Geetanjali Thapa
- Cinematography: Rajeev Ravi
- Edited by: Atanu Mukherjee; Ewa Lind
- Music by: Songs: Rochak Kohli; Viveick-Mayur; Chinmay Harshe; Vikram-Chetan; Background score: Gingger Shankar; Atif Afzal
- Production companies: Moving Pictures; Yaffle Films; Sikhya Entertainment; AKFPL; Fission Features; Pardesi Films; DAR Motion Pictures; Arte
- Distributed by: Fortissimo Films
- Release dates: 18 May 2013 (Cannes Film Festival); 15 December 2017 (India)
- Running time: 92 minutes
- Country: India
- Language: Hindi

Monsoon Shootout is a 2013 Indian Hindi-language neo-noir action thriller film written and directed by Amit Kumar and produced by Guneet Monga, Trevor Ingma, Martijn de Grunt, and co-produced by Anurag Kashyap, and Vivek Rangachari, starring Vijay Varma, Geetanjali Thapa, Nawazuddin Siddiqui and Tannishtha Chatterjee in the lead roles. The film received positive reviews at the 2013 Cannes Film Festival in the Official Midnight Screenings section. Belonging to the school of Parallel cinema, Monsoon Shootout was released worldwide four years later on 15 December 2017 to positive reviews.

== Plot ==
As the raging monsoon lashes Mumbai, the commercial and mafia capital of India, the police struggle to keep up with the gangsters who are ever more emboldened. Aditya “Adi”, a principled rookie cop as his first assignment on the force, joins an elite, anti-extortion unit of the Mumbai police led by Khan, a cop in the ‘Dirty Harry’ mold. On his first evening on the job, Adi had planned to meet his ex-lover Anu and to get back with her, but he misses the date when Khan has set up an ambush for a dreaded gangster.

However, the ambush goes wrong, and Adi chases Shiva, a seemingly armed and dangerous criminal, into a dead-end alley. Unsure if Shiva is, indeed, the wanted gangster, Adi has a moment of reckoning; whether to shoot or not to shoot. Whatever his decision is, every decision will take him on a journey that pits him against a system which demands a compromise of his morals. As he lives through the dramatic consequences of each decision, he realizes that every choice has its price.

== Cast ==
- Nawazuddin Siddiqui as Shiva
- Vijay Varma as Aditya (Adi)
- Tannishtha Chatterjee as Rani
- Neeraj Kabi as Inspector Khan
- Geetanjali Thapa as Anu
- Sreejita De as Geeta
- Nalneesh Neel as Goon
- Prithvi Zutshi as Minister
- Farhan Mohammad Hanif Shaikh as Chhotu, Shiva's son
- Surya Mohan Kulshreshtha (Baba) as Tiwari, builder
- Neha Gupta as Tiwari's wife
- R. Balasubramanian as Dagar bhai
- Irawati Harshe Mayadev as DCP Nishi
- Onkar Das Manikpuri as a taxi driver
- Jayant Gadekar as Patil, constable
- Niranjan N. Asrani as Police Commissioner
- Rohit Nitin Arekar as Pinto
- Pravina Deshpande as Adi's mother
- Shruti Bapna as Jemina Joseph
- Chandrakant Taneja as Magistrate Naik
- Honey Chhaya as Paradise Lodge manager
- Akhilesh Tiwari as paanwala
- Bhagwan Das as a blind beggar
- Mukesh Kumar as a one-armed beggar
- Raj Rao as ox-cart driver
- A. R. Rama as a rider
- Raghuvir as Nepali guard
- Mohit Chauhan as Ali, builder
- Akriti as Ali's wife
- Banwarilal Jhol as a chauffeur
- Adi Vyom as Inspector Khan's son
- Anupama Minz as Khan's wife
- Edith Minz as Khan's mother-in-law
- Tishya Tara as Khan's daughter

== Production and development ==
Director Amit Kumar stated that after he saw Robert Enrico's Oscar-winning short film An Occurrence at Owl Creek Bridge, he became interested and fascinated by the idea of human decision-making, and how quickly can one make a very difficult decision when one's life is at stake. This idea came to fruition in the form of Monsoon Shootout.

Kumar had previously assisted film director Asif Kapadia on his BAFTA-winning feature The Warrior where he met Trevor Ingman. Ingman decided to help seek finances for Kumar's film starting in 2008, but was unable to do so because of the closure of the UK Film Council which was initially supposed to cover half the production costs. Kumar set sights to find an Indian production partner, and in 2010, he ran into Guneet Monga who had produced Michael Winterbottom's Trishna. When Kumar stated his lack of an Indian producer, Monga immediately jumped at the opportunity to fund the film. However, the producers decided that although they loved Kumar's script and idea, they felt he needed to cast a star in the lead role. Kumar worked with Nawazuddin Siddiqui in his student short film The Bypass and decided to cast him in the lead role.

== Reception ==
The Times of India's Lasyapriya Sundaram rated the film 3/5, praising the cinematography of Rajeev Ravi and Vijay Varma's debut performance in a lead role. She opines that "while the idea hooks the viewer, what fails the film is its execution", also critiquing that "since the actors reprise their roles thrice over, they often don't have enough screen time to flesh out their characters adequately".

Saibal Chatterjee writing in NDTV headlines the review saying, "Nawazuddin Siddiqui's Noir Thriller Is Absorbing, Even Startling". He describes the film as "Shot through with stylistic flourishes and narrative sleights that frequently add up to arresting images and moments, first-time director Amit Kumar's niftily crafted Monsoon Shootout is absorbing, even startling. The propulsive, crisply edited noir thriller set in Mumbai's dark, dank and dangerous underbelly is consistently intriguing on account of its structure. Add to this the film's all-around technical finesse and the near-flawless performances from the principal actors and you have a crime drama that has the feel of a veritable tour de force." He praises the score by Gingger Shankar, defining it as pulsating with the energy that adds a throbbing soundscape to the film. Rating it as 3/5, he recommends the film to viewers saying "Don't prevaricate or duck for cover. Walk right into the path of this slickly staged shootout. You won't regret the decision."

Shalini Langer writing in The Indian Express, finds the film somewhat lacking in consistency but overall praises the director, actors and especially the cinematographer Rajeev Ravi for capturing the unglamorous side of Mumbai in all its ambiguity.

Mint's Uditi Jhunjhunwala finds the film "a technically accomplished, but emotionally wanting, noir thriller".

=== Cannes reception ===
The film was shown during the French 2013 Cannes Film Festival in theMidnight Screenings section. Early Cannes reception for the film has been positive with many international critics taking a liking to the film's noir, artistic detailing.

British newspaper The Guardian's Peter Bradshaw gave a very positive first look review of the film stating that it's "a brash exploitation picture, a violent thriller on the tough streets of Mumbai about rule-breaking, bone-breaking cops" and "an entertaining popcorn movie with a twist, for which commercial success is on the cards." He described the film as "Dirty Harry meets Sliding Doors."

The Hollywood Reporter's Deborah Young described the film as "a ferocious Mumbai cops and gangsters drama, and a satisfyingly arty plot that turns in on itself to examine the outcome of three possible choices a rookie cop might make when he confronts a ruthless killer. Three times the story returns to a key moment: a boy with a gun uncertain whether to pull the trigger." She had major praise for Nawazuddin Siddiqui's performance, stating that "Most memorable of all is Siddiqui, who is every inch an unstoppable force of nature, and lucky we are that so much of the violence he wreaks happens off-camera."

== Soundtrack ==
The soundtrack was released by Saregama Music.

Track listing
No.	Title	Lyrics	Music	Singer(s)	Length
1.	"Pal"	Sumant Vadhera	Rochak Kohli	Arijit Singh	4:48
2.	"Andheri Raat"	Kartik Krishnan	Viveick Rajagopalan, Mayur Narvekar	Neha Bhasin, Aklesh Sutar, Rajiv Sundaresan	3:38
3.	"Miliyo Re"	Deepak Ramola	Rochak Kohli	Rochak Kohli, Monali Thakur	3:22
4.	"Miss You Balma"	Chinmay Harshe	Chinmay Harshe	Akriti Kakar	2:54
5.	"Maachis Ki Teeli"	Rohit Bhasy, Neeraj Sharma	Vikram-Chetan	Bhavya Pandit, Gautam Chatterjee, Neeraj Sharma	4:09
6.	"Faislay"	Rohit Bhasy, Vidhi Gulati, Vinit Gulati, Vikram Shastri	Vikram-Chetan	Mandar Deshpande, Chetan Rao, Fiona D'Monty	4:20
Total length:					23:11

== Accolades ==
Award Ceremony	Category	Recipient	Result	Ref.(s)
10th Mirchi Music Awards	Upcoming Lyricist of The Year	Sumant Vadhera – "Pal"	Nominated	
