= Guneet Monga Kapoor =

Indian film producer (born 1983)

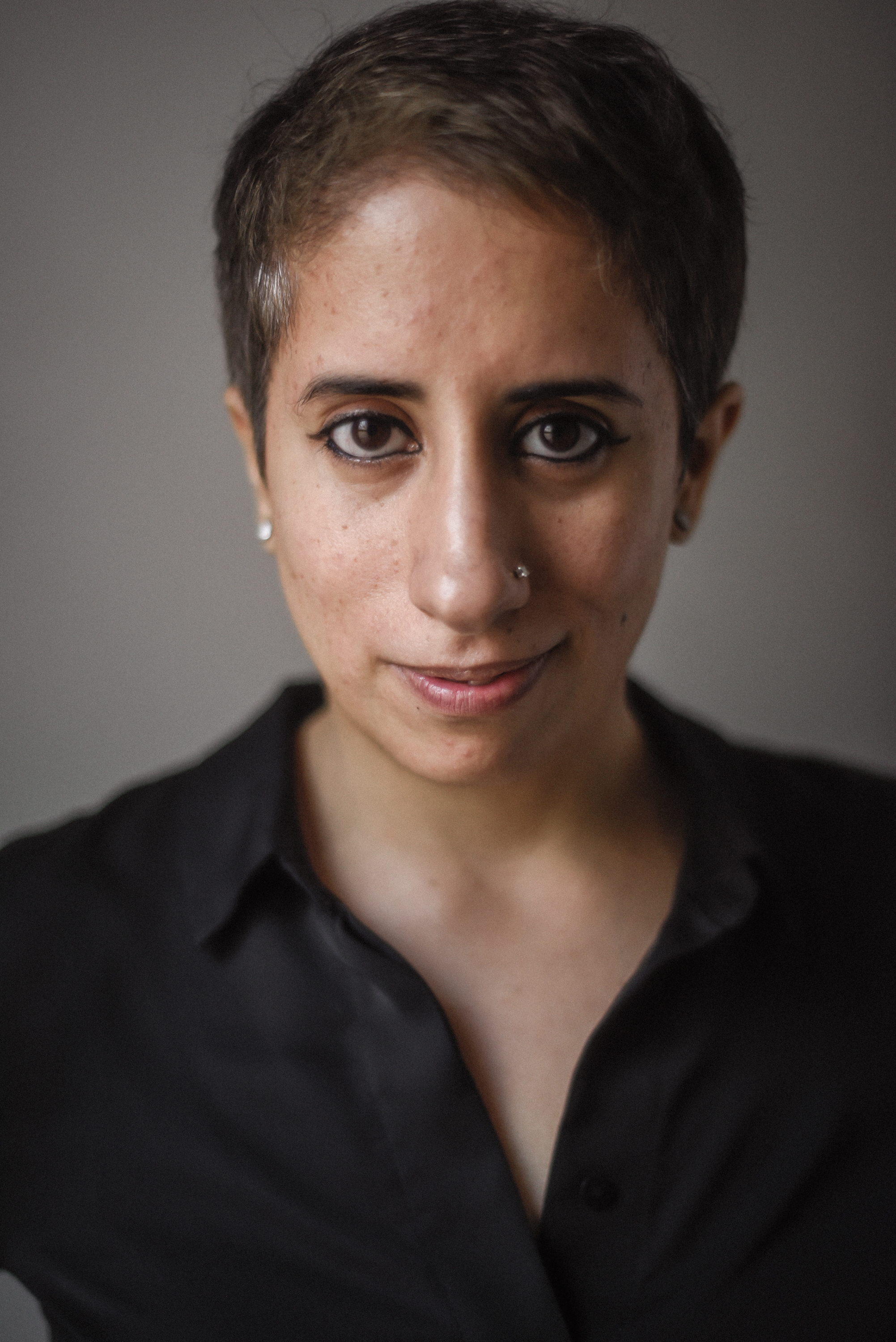
- Monga in 2018
- Born: 21 November 1983 (age 42); New Delhi, India
- Other name: Guneet Monga Kapoor
- Education: Guru Gobind Singh Indraprastha University
- Occupations: Film producer, CEO of Sikhya Entertainment
- Spouse: Sunny Kapoor (m. 2022)

Guneet Monga Kapoor (born 21 November 1983) is an Indian film producer. She is the producer of the 2023 Academy Award-winning documentary short film The Elephant Whisperers. Monga is the founder of Sikhya Entertainment a boutique film production house that produced notable films like Gangs of Wasseypur, Peddlers, The Lunchbox, Masaan, Zubaan and Pagglait.

In 2018, Monga was amongst the first producers from India to be inducted in the Academy of Motion Picture Arts and Sciences. She served as an executive producer on Period. End of Sentence. which won the 2019 Academy Award for Best Documentary Short Film. Monga was voted as one of the top 12 women achievers in the global entertainment industry by The Hollywood Reporter and among the top 50 Indians changing India by India Today. In 2023, Guneet won her second Academy Award for the Netflix documentary short, The Elephant Whisperers.

In 2021, Guneet Monga was conferred with the Chevalier dans l'Ordre des Arts et des Lettres by the French Government.

== Early and personal life ==
Guneet Monga was born in Delhi and received her primary education at Bluebells School International and received a degree in mass communications from Madhubala Institute of Mass Communication and Electronic Media affiliated with Guru Gobind Singh Indraprastha University, Delhi in 2004. She married Sunny Kapoor on 12 December 2022.

== Career ==
In 2003, Monga interned with a production coordinator in Delhi, and after receiving her mass communications she started career as production coordinator for international productions, most notably Vic Sarin's Partition.

Monga was fascinated about film after watching her mother's friend, Anureeta Saigal, work on production for international films. She interned with Saigal and decided that this was what she wanted to do for the rest of her life. She convinced a neighbor to lend her INR 75 lacs (about US$188,000 in 2007) to make movies.

She shifted to Mumbai in 2006, when she started working in cricket film, Say Salaam India (2007). This was followed by Rang Rasiya (2008) and Dasvidaniya (2008) and later in 2009, during the making of Once Upon a Time in Mumbaai (2010), produced by Balaji Telefilms, she met director-producer, Anurag Kashyap, and subsequently in late 2009 she joined Anurag Kashyap Films.

Monga's first major international film was the 2010 Academy Award for Best Live Action Short Film-nominated short, Kavi (2009), about bonded labour in India, directed by Gregg Helvey, and which won the Student Academy Award – Narrative in 2009. Meanwhile, in 2008 she started her own production company, Sikhya Entertainment and also a line production company. With Anurag Kashyap, she went on to work on film like Gangs of Wasseypur (2012) and That Girl in Yellow Boots (2011), besides, Trishna (2011), Shaitan (2011), Michael (2011), and Aiyya. She also raised nearly ₹10 million (US$100,000) for Peddlers (2012) made of a budget of Rs 2 cr., by posting the film's script on Facebook. Peddlers was selected at the Critics' Week, won rave reviews and opened new markets for Indian Cinema.

She produced Monsoon Shootout as a co-production between India, Netherland and UK and The Lunchbox, a project shown at Film Bazaar (2011), Cinemart (2012), Berlinale Co-Production Market (2012) and TorinoFilmLab (2012) as a co-production between India, France, Germany & USA.

In May 2013, when The Lunchbox and Monsoon Shootout both were selected for the Critics' Week and a midnight screening at the 2013 Cannes Film Festival, respectively, The Hollywood Reporter called her "most prolific producers of a new wave of cinema" while The Hollywood Reporter's "2012 Women in Entertainment special", placed her amongst "12 international players to watch"; India Today has credited her for giving a facelift to independent cinema, and bridging "the gap between Indian films and foreign buyers and distributors."

== Filmography ==
- Say Salaam India (2007)
- Rang Rasiya (2008)
- Dasvidaniya (2008)
- Kavi (2009)
- Once Upon a Time in Mumbaai (2010)
- That Girl in Yellow Boots (2011)
- Shaitan (2011)
- Trishna (2011)
- Michael (2011)
- Peddlers (2012)
- Gangs of Wasseypur - Part 1 (2012)
- Gangs of Wasseypur - Part 2 (2012)
- Aiyyaa (2012)
- Shahid (2013)
- The Lunchbox (2013)
- Monsoon Shootout (2013)
- Mickey Virus (2013)
- White Lies (2014)
- Vakratunda Mahakaaya (2015)
- Masaan (2015)
- Zubaan (2016)
- Haraamkhor (2017)
- Period. End of Sentence. (2018)
- Soorarai Pottru (2019) (Tamil)
- Pagglait (2021)
- 1232 KMS (2021) (executive producer)
- The Elephant Whisperers (2022) (Tamil)
- Kathal (2023)
- Kill (2024)
- Anuja (2024)

As an actress

- Love, Wrinkle-free (2012)

== Awards ==
- 2022 Academy Award for Best Documentary Short Film, The Elephant Whisperers (Producer)
