= Shorts (2013 film) =

- Theatrical release poster
- Directed by: Shlok Sharma; Siddharth Gupta; Anirban Roy; Rohit Pandey; Neeraj Ghaywan
- Produced by: Anurag Kashyap; Guneet Monga
- Starring: Nawazuddin Siddiqui; Huma Qureshi; Richa Chadda; Vineet Kumar Singh; Satya Anand; Ratnabali Bhattacharjee; Shweta Tripathi; Aaditii Khanna; Preeti Singh; Murari Kumar; Arjun Srivastava
- Music by: Jaidev Kumar
- Production companies: AKFPL; Tumbhi; The Globe Hunters; Open Cafe Productions Flms; Lemon Tree Films; Om Cine Arts
- Distributed by: PVR Pictures
- Release date: 12 July 2013
- Country: India
- Language: Hindi

Shorts is a compilation of five short films directed by Neeraj Ghaywan, Vasan Bala, Anubhuti Kashyap (Anurag Kashyap's sister), Shlok Sharma and Gitanjali Rao. The five short films titled Sujata, Mehfuz, Audacity, Epilogue, and Shor were released on 12 July 2013.

The Gangs of Wasseypur trio – Nawazuddin Siddiqui, Huma Qureshi and Richa Chadda- teamed up again for the anthology co-produced by Guneet Monga and Anurag Kashyap, also featuring newcomers Murari Kumar, Arjun Srivasava, Satya Anand, Vineet Kumar Singh, Preeti Singh and Ratnabali.

== Synopsis ==
Sujata directed by Shlok Sharma

Starring: Huma Qureshi, Shweta Tripathi, Satya Anand and Aditya Kumar

Sujata is a riveting tale of a young girl, who is struggling to come out of the clutches of her tormenting cousin brother. At a very young age, she is forced to live with her cousin and his family. Herein, begins a life of incessant harassment by her cousin brother. Even as an adult she lives in the shadow of fear. For years, she changes addresses and identities in the hope of finding freedom; but each time he hunts her down. Neither the police, nor the NGOs are able to help her. Pushed to a corner, she decides to take the extreme step.

Mehfuz directed by Rohit Pandey

Starring: Nawazuddin Siddiqui and Aditi Khanna

In an ambiguous space and time. The city has turned mad, as violence has taken its toll. But, far away in the sounds of silence at the border of the town, a man takes care of all the death around. He drags away this usual routine with every passing night. One night, he notices a strange woman wandering on empty streets. As her behaviour changes, so does his journey.

Audacity directed by Anirban Roy

Starring Preeti Singh, Sankar Debnath and Kanchan Mullick

A thirteen-year-old girl has her first real confrontation with authority when her father forbids her to play the American dance music she loves. When she decides to take revenge, the situation escalates to become a neighbourhood scandal. A dark comedy about parental authority, teenage rebellion, curry, whiskey, and house music.

"Epilogue" directed by Siddharth Gupta

Starring: Richa Chaddha and Arjun Shrivastav A relationship that has already fallen apart and is just about to snap. It describes the love and intimacy, the entangling of two lives and the completely symbiotic nature of a couple. It reflects the possessiveness control isolation, depression and desperation that a relationship can lead to, representing a cycle that needs to be broken to keep sane.

Shor directed by Neeraj Ghaywan

Starring: Vineet Kumar Singh and Ratnabali Bhattacharjee

Lallan and Meena, a couple from Banaras, work to make a living in Mumbai. Meena works in a sewing factory. During a phone call, they address issues involving death, divorce, and reconciliation, leading them to reassess their lives.

== Cast ==
- Nawazuddin Siddiqui
- Huma Qureshi
- Richa Chadda
- Aditya Kumar
- Vineet Kumar Singh
- Satya Anand
- Ratnabali Bhattacharjee
- Shweta Tripathi
- Aditi Khanna
- Preeti Singh
- Murari Kumar
- Arjun Srivastava
- Risabh Dev Vaishnav

== Critical response ==
Madhureeta Mukherjee of The Times of India gave it 2.5 stars out of 5 and stated that the film is poignant and touching, with excellent performances. Rediff gave the film 3 out of 5 stars. Hindustan Times critic stated that Shorts is breathtaking to borderline bizarre Mid-Day stated that Shorts is a unique experiment, which deserves an applause. According to LiveMint critic, "Shorts is an omnibus of vignettes about urban living." Deccan Chronicle rated it 4 out of 5 stars.

In 2013, Neeraj Ghaywan's short section Shor, part of the anthology, won the Grand Jury Award at the South Asian International Film Festival.
