= Peddlers =

Peddlers may refer to:

- Peddler, a travelling vendor of goods
- Peddlers (film), a 2012 Indian film
- The Peddlers, British music group
