= Sikhya Entertainment =

Indian film production company

Sikhya Entertainment Pvt Ltd
- Type: Private
- Industry: Entertainment
- Founded: 2008
- Headquarters: Mumbai, Maharashtra, India
- Key people: Guneet Monga; Achin Jain
- Products: Films
- Services: Film Production
- Owner: Reliance Strategic Business Ventures (50.1%)
- Parent: Jio Studios
- Website: sikhyaentertainment.com

Sikhya Entertainment is a film production and distribution company that was established by Guneet Monga and Achin Jain in 2008.

== History ==
They have released the films Dasvidaniya (2008), That Girl in Yellow Boots (2011), The Lunchbox (2013) and Masaan. They are also notable for producing documentaries, such as The Elephant Whisperers (2022).

They have collaborated with some of the filmmakers from different parts of the world including Oscar-winning Bosnian director Danis Tanovic (Tigers), French director Nicolas Saada (Taj Mahal) and British filmmaker Michael Winterbottom (Trishna), to name a few.

In 2016, Sikhya Entertainment ventured into its first English Language film, The Ashram, starring Academy Award-winning actress Melissa Leo and Kal Penn, Norwegian-German film, What Will People Say, directed by Iram Haq which premiered at Toronto Film Festival 2017 amongst others.

The range of Production Services offered by Sikhya includes- Research, Creative collaborations with local Writers, Location Scouting, Budgeting, Casting, Permits, Travel & Accommodation, Hiring of Crew, extensive Post Production services and transparent accounting practices including Third party audit system.

In 2020, they released one of a kind short-film anthology, Zindagi In Short, in collaboration with India's leading e-commerce giant Flipkart. The anthology opened to a thunderous response from both critics and audiences. In addition, Sikhya has successfully ventured into the Southern Film Industry with the blockbuster film on the life of Captain Gopinath, founder of Air Deccan, Soorarai Pottru.

In February 2026, Jio Studios acquired a majority 50.1% stake in Sikhya.

== Filmography ==
Key
†	Denotes films that have not yet been released

Documentaries
Year	Title	Director	Other notes
2018	Period. End of Sentence.	Rayka Zehtabchi	Available on Netflix. Won the Academy Award for Best Documentary Short Film.
2022	Kicking Balls	Vijayeta Kumar	
2022	She Builds	Vijayeta Kumar	Docu series, available on Disney+ Hotstar
2022	The Elephant Whisperers	Kartiki Gonsalves	Available on Netflix. Won at the Academy Awards.

Feature
Year	Title	Director	Other notes
2008	Dasvidaniya	Shashant Shah	
2011	That Girl in Yellow Boots	Anurag Kashyap	
2011	Shaitan	Bejoy Nambiar	
2013	The Lunchbox	Ritesh Batra	
2013	Peddlers	Vasan Bala	
2013	Monsoon Shootout	Amit Kumar	
2014	Tigers	Danis Tanović	
2015	Zubaan	Mozeez Singh	
2015	Masaan	Neeraj Ghaywan	
2015	Haraamkhor	Shlok Sharma	
2017	What Will People Say	Iram Haq	
2020	Soorarai Pottru	Sudha Kongara	
2021	Pagglait	Umesh Bist	
2023	Kathal	Yashowardhan Mishra	
2024	Kill	Nikhil Nagesh Bhat	
2025	Jugnuma: The Fable	Raam Reddy	
2026	Dorothy	Karthik Subbaraj	
2026	Udta Teer	Aakash Kaushik	

Shows
Year	Title	Director	Other notes
2023	Gutar Gu	Saqib Pandor	Amazon miniTV
2024	Gyaarah Gyaarah	Umesh Bist	ZEE5

Short Films
Year	Title	Director	Other notes
2018	Period. End of Sentence.	Rayta Zehtabchi	Available on Netflix
2020	Zindagi in Shorts: Pinni; Sleeping Partner; Sunny Side Upar; Nano So Phobia; Chhaju Ke Dahi Bhalle; Thappad; Swaaha		Available on Netflix
2021	Shimmy	Disha Noyonika Rindani	Available on Amazon miniTV
2021	Gupt Gyaan	Saqib Pandor	Available on Amazon miniTV
2022	1800 Life	Maanavi Bedi	Available on Amazon miniTV
2022	Good Morning	Jyoti Kapoor Das	Available on Amazon miniTV
2022	Condition's Apply	Puja Banerji	Available on Amazon miniTV
2022	Clean	Zoya Parvin	Available on Amazon miniTV
