= Cargo (2019 film) =

2019 Indian film by Arati Kadav

- Poster
- Directed by: Arati Kadav
- Written by: Arati Kadav
- Produced by: Navin Shetty; Shlok Sharma; Arati Kadav; Zain Matcheswalla; Anurag Kashyap
- Starring: Vikrant Massey; Shweta Tripathi
- Cinematography: Kaushal Shah
- Edited by: Paramita Ghosh
- Music by: Shezan Shaikh
- Production companies: Fundamental Pictures; Electric Films
- Distributed by: Netflix
- Release dates: 19 October 2019 (MAMI); 9 September 2020 (Netflix)
- Running time: 113 minutes
- Country: India
- Language: Hindi

Cargo is a 2019 Indian Hindi-language science fiction dark comedy film written and directed by Arati Kadav. The film is produced by Kadav, Shlok Sharma, Navin Shetty, Zain Matcheswalla, and Anurag Kashyap. Starring Vikrant Massey and Shweta Tripathi in the lead roles, the story is set on a spaceship named Pushpak 634A where a scientist Prahastha, works for the Post Death Transition services with the help of a female astronaut, where dead people are recycled for rebirth. Cargo premiered at the 2019 MAMI Film Festival under the spotlight section. The film premiered on Netflix on 9 September 2020.

== Cast ==
- Vikrant Massey as Prahastha, a Yamaduta
- Shweta Tripathi as Yuvishka Shekhar
- Nandu Madhav as Nitigya
- Konkana Sen Sharma as Mandakini (Special appearance)
- Ritwik Bhowmik as an aggressive Cargo
- Rohan Shah as Shashank (cameo)
- Biswapati Sarkar as Ramchandra Negi
- Hansal Mehta as himself
- Anjum Rajabali as Raman
- Prabal Panjabi as Bhavesh Joshi, the cargo

== Production ==
=== Development ===
The idea of Cargo came to director Arati Kadav in 2017 after she worked on pre-production for a film for six years before it got shelved. After getting angry at the situation, Kadav started writing another script and after 2–3 months, she developed an idea. A friend, Rahul Puri, had told her that film school Whistling Woods International was going to be free for a month and its studio space, camera and some lights will be available for shoot. She started thinking about what could be made in a single location and pictured a spaceship. Kadav wrote a "complicated massive intergalactic superhero story" for the next three months but later realised it was too expensive to shoot.

She then wrote a new screenplay based on a one liner, "an immigration office in space for dead people." Cargo is the sixth screenplay written by Kadav who has earlier made short films like Time Machine. In order to manage the budget of the film, Kadav decided to make a film with minimum location. She wrote a science fiction story set in a spaceship that also tapped into Indian mythology and issues like life and death. Kadav decided to showcase the technology in the film from the 1980s and not very advanced. She said, "I didn't want the tech to be intimidating but more endearing." For references, her team looked at Gravity (2013) to real NASA visuals "to figure out what we could use from those films that wouldn’t cost us much."

Kadav was planning to make a film with Phantom Films, but the production house dissolved and the project was shelved. However, its founders Anurag Kashyap and Vikramaditya Motwane decided to back Cargo. Kadav cited Argentine short-story writer Jorge Luis Borges and sci-fi writer Ted Chiang as her inspirations for the story. She stated: "Eastern sci-fi is more relatable as it matches with Indian culture in its milieu and values." Massey felt the story "abstract and gorgeous", further mentioning: "I had to read the script in detail to [decipher] what she was saying. It stunned me, and that's when I knew I had to do this film."

=== Filming and post-production ===
Several spaces from the set of spaceship were reused during the shoot. Discarded automated teller machines were used as palm reading machines in the film. The film was shot in a spaceship set for 27 days. Kadav felt that a single-location film could be visually boring so decided to use a lot of different colours and lights to make it look interesting. There were two spaceship sets for both interior and exterior shoots. It was also shot outdoors for nearly 10 days. The entire shoot took 30 days and was finished in November 2018.

Kadav got permission to use a shooting floor at Whistling Woods International for a couple of weeks. She used the space to create the Pushpak 634A, a futuristic space station, and other domains in the film. She said that she was "very aware of its graphics requirements while writing the script itself, and a VFX person was always involved in the making, right from the pre-production stage."

Kadav consciously decided to keep the VFX to a minimum to cut costs and mostly use it to visualize the exterior of the jellyfish-like spaceship. Kadav decided to keep a retro feel to the visual design of the spaceship. The healing machine in the film was designed to look like an old vacuum cleaner. She believed that there is "always [a] need to have a strong philosophy" at the core of the sci-fi genre" to "talk about things that continue to affect us and matter in our lives."

Due to the low budget, motorcycle helmets were used for astronaut helmets in the film that were enhanced with paper and cardboard. Konkana Sen Sharma plays a cameo appearance in the film for which Kadav wrote a long backstory which is not shown. The visual effects work took a year to complete. Green screens were used while shooting at a specific angle and pages were printed and pasted pages on the backgrounds to trick people into thinking it was created in post-production. The music is composed by Shezan Shaikh, the cinematography is done by Kaushal Shah while Paramita Ghosh has served as the editor.

== Reception ==
The film received mixed reviews. Review aggregator website Rotten Tomatoes rated it 64%, based on 11 reviews, and an average rating of 6.5/10.

Pradeep Menon of Firstpost wrote: "A philosophical tale, a dark comedy, and a tight budget space film all rolled into one, Cargo is one of those oddball movies that will undoubtedly go on to develop a bit of a cult following over time." Tipu Sultan of HuffPost said that Kadav's "true success lies in how she wraps all this up under the garb of a comedy and serves up a film that is devilishly hilarious and ceaselessly entertaining." Eric Kohn of IndieWire noted, "While Cargo stumbles on plot, it excels at vision, and bodes well for the potential of a filmmaker capable of innovating within familiar restraint." Peter Debruge of Variety said that Kadav "shows creativity and a gift for world-building in this unlikely sci-fi fable, which playfully reimagines reincarnation." Rahul Desai, a film critic from Film Companion says: "It’s both real and unreal at once, and the visual dissonance adds to the way Cargo – and its playful marriage of the past and future – hopes to be perceived."

== See also ==
- Science fiction films in India
