= Teecha Baap Tyacha Baap =

- Directed by: Atul Kale
- Screenplay by: Guru Thakur
- Story by: Guru Thakur
- Produced by: Arun Rangachari
- Starring: Abhishek Sethiya; Mrinmayee Godbole; Sachin Pilgaonkar; Arun Nalawade
- Cinematography: Shailesh Awasthhi
- Production company: DAR Motion Pictures
- Distributed by: DAR Motion Pictures
- Release date: 6 October 2011
- Country: India
- Language: Marathi

Teecha Baap Tyacha Baap (Marathi: तिचा बाप त्याचा बाप) is a Marathi film directed by Atul Kale, and starring Abhishek Sethiya, Mrinmayee Godbole in the lead roles. It also stars Arun Nalawade, Sachin Pilgaonkar supporting roles. The film is produced under Dar Motion Pictures Dar Motion Picture.

== Cast ==
- Sachin Pilgaonkar as Shashi Phaterphekar
- Arun Nalawade as Vikrant Deshmukh
- Abhishek Sethiya as Neil Phaterphekar
- Mrinmayee Godbole as Monica Deshmukh
- Makarand Anaspure as Aaburao Tanaji Shringarpure
- Shruti Marathe as Canada Pai
- Kishor Pradhan as Anna
- Anand Ingle and Jayawant Wadkar as Chandru and Indru The Spies
