= City of Gold (2010 film) =

City of Gold - Mumbai 1982: Ek Ankahee Kahani
- Theatrical release poster
- Directed by: Mahesh Manjrekar
- Screenplay by: Mahesh Manjrekar; Jayant Pawar
- Story by: Jayant Pawar
- Produced by: Arun Rangachari
- Starring: Ankush Chaudhari; Siddharth Jadhav; Sachin Khedekar; Sameer Dharmadhikari; Karan Patel
- Cinematography: Ajith V. Reddy
- Edited by: Sarvesh Parab
- Music by: Ajit Parab
- Production company: DAR Motion Pictures
- Release date: 23 April 2010
- Country: India
- Languages: Hindi; Marathi

City of Gold is a 2010 Indian political thriller film. The film was Mahesh Manjrekar's 17th film, having previously directed critically acclaimed films such as Astitva and Viruddh... Family Comes First. It was adapted from Jayant Pawar's Marathi play, Adhantar, with Pawar going on to co-write the film's screenplay. The film explores the life of Mumbai's mill workers after the Mumbai mills shut down in response to the Great Bombay Textile Strike of the early 1980s.

The film opened to mixed reviews, though it was commended for its themes and acting.

It was simultaneously shot in Marathi as Lalbaug Parel.

== Plot ==
The film is the story of a family of mill workers in Mumbai. It follows the workers as politics and greed rise in Mumbai and exposes the collusion between the triumvirate of big business, the political establishment, and the trade union leaders who ostensibly were charged with protecting the rights of the mill workers.

Baba Dhudu narrates his story to his fiancé. He is the son of a mill worker and has two brothers, Naru and Mohan, and a sister, Manju. Along with his parents, they stay in a congested locality of Parel. Mohan has a regular job as an accountant, while Naru and Baba are jobless. Naru is a local strongman and bashes anyone who crosses him or his friends. Baba aspires to be a professional playwright and spends time in writing, which his family despises as this does not bring any income for the family. His father is retired from the mill and fighting for his retirement dues from the mill, which is on the verge of closing down. The mill is managed by the son-in-law of the owner, Mr. Khaitan, who is a very hard-nosed, selfish person. His aim is the close-down of the mill and establishing a real estate business over the mill land, which is worth gold in today's market. In order to convert the mill into a commercial complex, he needs a NOC from the mill workers as well as their resignation letters. Mill workers are adamant over their dues and are not willing to sacrifice their jobs. Rane and Govind are their leaders, and Dr. Sawant is the union leader and fights the legal battle for the mill workers. Govind is short-tempered and always willing to physically fight with the owners, while Rane is practical and feels legal recourse is the best way to get justice.

The mill workers are fighting for dues of six months, and one fine day it is announced that the mill would be closed down. Mill workers go on strike, and a local politician becomes involved.

Meanwhile, Naru gets involved with local don Parshya Bhai and starts running errands for him along with his friends. Mohan, who is a hardcore cricket buff, one fine day siphons off Rs. 25,000 from his company to bet on a match, which he loses. Baba rescues him from the police after settling the dues by selling his kidney, unknown to his family. Manju becomes pregnant and is distraught when she discovers that her lover is already married. Her father gets a paralytic attack due to this and is bedridden. He requests Rane to marry his daughter, which he accepts.

The local politician intervenes, and mill workers agree to give NOC but not resignation, and it is decided that a part of the mill would be restored. But the very night when the mill is supposed to resume, it is blown away by an explosion, presumably by the owner. Now nothing in hand, the mill workers sit on a strike. Things go from bad to worse, and they start selling off their personal possessions to survive. Some of the ladies get into prostitution, while kids get into mugging. There is a constant face-off between owners and mill workers. In a fit of rage one fine day, Govind assaults the brother-in-law of the owner. He is enraged at this action and hires Parshya Bhai to kill Govind. Parshya Bhai assigns the task to Naru but does not tell him who the target is. Naru shoots Govind dead, only to realise later that he has shot down the father of his best friend, 'Speedbreaker'. Naru goes into hiding. Later, his father dies out of shock at the news. Naru later confronts Parshya Bhai, who tricked him by not paying his share of the contract. He kills him with the help of his friends. Naru is in turn killed by Speedbreaker, and he takes over the gang of Parshya Bhai. The mill owner finally comes up with some cash, and the mill workers give in and agree to sign required legal documents for a very small part of their original compensation.

Rane is distraught that just as the court is about to give its verdict, the owners have tricked them, taking advantage of their desperate situation.

Sometime later, Baba finally achieves his dream of becoming a professional playwright and is about to take his mother to the first show of his play. His mother is overwhelmed by his success, and after a long, hard life, she finally sees some hope. When she reads his name in the newspaper, she dies out of shock.

Baba finishes his narration and takes his fiancé to meet all the characters he had narrated in his story. Rane is still delusional that he will win the legal battle; the rest of them have got their lives back on track, and Speedbreaker runs his gang along with his friends.

== Production ==
The director of the film Mahesh Manjrekar writes in the director notes:

"When I took a sabbatical from Hindi cinema close to four years ago, I promised myself that if and only if an exceptional subject came my way would I venture back to do a Hindi film. Lalbaug Parel is that subject."

After completing the script in 2007, Manjrekar decided to wait until he could find a producer who would be willing to do a film without musical numbers. Eventually, DAR Motion Pictures produced the film.

=== Legal issues ===
After the film's release the family of Dutta Samant served Mahesh Manjrekar with legal notice, claiming that the film wrongly placed the blame for the mills' closure on Samant. They also objected to Manjrekar's portrayal of the mill workers' children, saying they were shown as "goons".

== Cast ==
- Shashank Shende as Anna
- Seema Biswas as Aai
- Ankush Choudhary as Baba
- Anusha Dandekar as Manasi
- Vineet Kumar Singh as Mohan
- Veena Jamkar as Manju
- Karan Patel as Naru
- Siddharth Jadhav as Speed Breaker
- Satish Kaushik as Mama
- Kashmera Shah as Mami
- Sameer Dharmadhikari as Mahendra
- Ganesh Yadav as Parshya Bhai
- Sachin Khedekar as Arvind Rane
- Vinay Apte as Govind
- Kishore Pradhan as Khaitan Sheth
- Vaibhav Mangle as Doctor Saheb
- Shyam Mashalkar as Nojh Dharmu
- Sai Tamhankar as Shalu / Naru's girlfriend
- Resham Tipnis as Dancer in the Laavni song "Tuzya girnicha vajude bhonga"
- Mayur Padwal As Datadya
- Vaibhav Padwal As Boing
- Mitesh Bawkar
- Kuldeep Patkar
- Jagruti More

== Soundtrack ==
=== Track listing ===
| No. | Title | Length |
|---|---|---|
| 1. | "Tuzya girnicha vajude bhonga – Laavani Dance" | 3:07 |
