= Aiyyaa =

2012 film by Sachin Kundalkar

- Theatrical release poster
- Directed by: Sachin Kundalkar
- Written by: Sachin Kundalkar
- Produced by: Anurag Kashyap; Guneet Monga; Meraj Shaikh
- Starring: Prithviraj Sukumaran; Rani Mukerji; Subodh Bhave; Nirmiti Sawant
- Cinematography: Amalendu Chaudhary
- Edited by: Abhijeet Deshpande
- Music by: Amit Trivedi
- Production companies: Viacom 18 Motion Pictures; AKFPL
- Distributed by: Viacom 18 Motion Pictures
- Release date: 12 October 2012
- Running time: 152 minutes
- Country: India
- Language: Hindi
- Box office: ₹9.58 crore

Aiyyaa (transl. Oh my!) is a 2012 Indian Hindi-language romantic comedy film written and directed by Sachin Kundalkar. The film stars Prithviraj Sukumaran and Rani Mukerji in the lead roles. It was jointly produced by Anurag Kashyap and Viacom 18 Motion Pictures. The film was released on 12 October 2012. It also marks Prithviraj's debut in Hindi cinema.

== Plot ==
The story is about a Marathi girl, Meenakshi Deshpande, falling in love with a Tamil artist, Surya Iyer. She is a librarian at a college and has five members in her family (including herself): a wheelchair-using grandmother who is blind and has gold teeth; her father, who smokes four cigarettes together; her mother, who is obsessed with Meenakshi's marriage; and her brother Nana, whose only love in life is dogs. To escape the craziness of her family, Meenakshi lives her life in dreams. In her dreams, the only thing she's doing is dancing and enacting her favourite actresses, Madhuri Dixit, Sridevi, and Juhi Chawla. Her colleague Maina, nicknamed "Gaga Bai," is an eccentric woman who dresses up in weird ensembles inspired by pop star Lady Gaga.

Meenakshi's family is looking for a suitable groom, but Meenakshi, who does not believe in arranged marriages, is waiting for her prince and wants her dream wedding. That's when Surya enters. Surya is an art student, and the moment Meenakshi looks at him, she falls in love with his tanned skin and a mysterious fragrance emanating from him. By this time her family has found the 'right guy' Madhav for her and is rushing with her wedding.

The rest of the film involves Madhav running after Meenakshi and Meenakshi following Surya. Nana gets engaged to Maina under bizarre circumstances when Meenakshi goes missing on her engagement when she was following Surya and ends up in his incense sticks factory. Meenakshi learns that Surya's fragrance, that she got enthralled by, was because of his involvement in the factory. In the end, Meenakshi succeeds in winning over Surya's heart, and they get engaged in a traditional Maharashtrian ceremony.

== Cast ==
- Prithviraj Sukumaran as Surya Iyer
- Rani Mukerji as Meenakshi Deshpande
- Varsha Usgaonkar as Padma Deshpande
- Jyoti Subhash as Meenakshi's Grandmother
- Nirmiti Sawant as Meenakshi's Mother (Aai)
- Anita Date-Kelkar as Maina
- Subodh Bhave as Madhav Rajadhyaksha
- Amey Wagh as Nana
- Satish Alekar as Meenakshi's father
- Kishori Ballal as Surya's mother
- Pakoda Pandi as Pakkada Pandi
- Devnendra Joshi as Babloo
- Madhura Deshpande as Kamala
- Esha Wadnekar as Anju
- Vineet Vatve as Purohit

== Production ==
Pre-production began in August 2011 and filming began by the first week of October 2011. Filming concluded in April 2012.

== Soundtrack ==
The soundtrack featured six songs composed by Amit Trivedi with lyrics written by Amitabh Bhattacharya.

== Reception ==
Professional reviews
Source	Rating
DNA India	2.5/5 stars
The Times of India	2.5/5 stars
YAHOO	3.5/5 stars
India Today	2.0/5 stars
Hindustan Times	2.0/5 stars
Bollywood Hungama	3.5/5 stars
Kerala Films	2.0/5 stars
Rediff	1.0/5 stars
India Masala	3.0/5 stars

The film was released worldwide on 12 October 2012. Aiyyaa received mixed-to-negative reviews from critics. While Rani's was praised by critics, the plot was criticised. Bravos, a review aggregator website for Indian movies, assigned the film an average score of 38 (out of 100) based on 7. Madhureeta Mukherjee of Times of India gave it 2.5 stars. "Even with such a talented ensemble, this one turns into a cultural showpiece, and gets lost in translation." "Aiyyaa is let down by its weak script," writes Prasanna D Zore of rediff.com.

Taran Adarsh of Bollywood Hungama gave it 3 stars. Kanika Sikka of DNA gave it 2.5 stars. "Aiyyaa is an average entertainer".

Kerala Films gave 2 stars and wrote "Aiyya is let down by a confused script." Anupama Chopra of Hindustan Times gave 2 stars and wrote "Whackiness can't carry a film." Shilpa Jamkhandikar of India Masala gave 3 stars, praising the cast and the stories, saying "What it doesn't have is something that binds all of this together. Kundalkar makes a bizarre mash-up of several genres and ends up with a film that doesn't do too much justice to any one of them."

Raghavendra Singh of FilmFare praised the movie and says "It takes courage to present something never-done-before on the larger-than-life canvas of the big screen. And surprisingly debut director (at least in Hindi films) Sachin Kundalkar shows this trait with great effect in his film Aiyyaa. Hats off to an established star, Rani Mukerji, for showing such conviction in Kundalkar's experimental vision."

== Box office ==
=== Overseas ===
Aiyyaa was released overseas in a very limited number of theatres (30 in the United Kingdom) and did poorly in overseas markets with its opening collecting around $125,500 overseas; it averaged $4,000 in each theatre over its opening weekend. It dropped 90% the following weekend.

=== India ===
Aiyya had high expectations at the box office due to aggressive advertising and rave reviews from trailers and promos alike. They were expecting 80%–100% occupancy throughout the country on its opening day and that it would collect 15–200 million on the first weekend.

== Awards and nominations ==
Award	Category	Recipients and nominees	Result	Ref.
5th Mirchi Music Awards	Upcoming Female Vocalist of The Year	Shalmali Kholgade – "Aga Bai"	Nominated	
