= Puja Gupta (actress) =

Indian actress

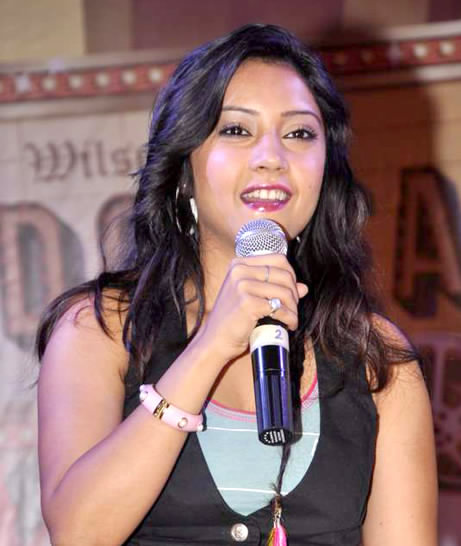
- Puja Gupta at the promotions of Mickey Virus at Wilson college
- Born: New Delhi, Delhi, India
- Occupations: Actress, model
- Years active: 2010–present

Puja Gupta is an Indian actress. She started her career as a child artist in Delhi. After studying in the U.S. she started her career in Mumbai with Paresh Rawal's play Kishen v/s Kanahiya, followed by another play, Dear Father. She has appeared in films like OMG – Oh My God!, Vicky Donor, Blood Money and Mickey Virus.

== Filmography ==
Year	Title	Role	Notes
2011	Chitkabrey – The Shades of Grey	Anjali Patel	
2012	Blood Money	Nandini	
2012	Vicky Donor	Shweta	
2012	OMG – Oh My God!	Hanif's daughter	
2013	Mickey Virus	Chutney	
2013	Assi Desi	Annie	
2013	Ek Sarkari Joota	Shazia	
2014	Badlapur Boys	Manjari	released
2014	Samrat & Co.	Shanti	
2014	Land of Leopold		
2014	I Promise You	Riva Goswami	Post
2015	Rifleganj	Naina	Filming
2018	Rabbi	Afiya	Released
2019	Rifflegunj	released	
2020	Riva	Riva	
