= Mumbai Cutting =

- Movie poster
- Directed by: Anurag Kashyap; Sudhir Mishra; Rahul Dholakia; Kundan Shah; Revathi; Jahnu Barua; Rituparno Ghosh; Shashanka Ghosh; Ruchi Narain; Ayush Raina; Manish Jha
- Produced by: Seemanto Roy; Junaid Memon Samrat Sengupta; Niyati Shah; Meraj Shaikh; (Sahara One); Whitecloud
- Music by: Ilaiyaraaja; Jeet Gannguli
- Production company: White Cloud Production
- Distributed by: Sahara One Motion Pictures
- Release date: 27 April 2008 (IFFLA)
- Running time: 130 minutes
- Country: India
- Language: Hindi

Mumbai Cutting is a 2008 Indian Hindi-language anthology film comprising eleven short films, telling eleven different stories based on life in Mumbai, which are directed by a host of eleven directors: Anurag Kashyap, Sudhir Mishra, Rahul Dholakia, Kundan Shah, Revathy, Jahnu Barua, Rituparno Ghosh, Shashanka Ghosh, Ruchi Narain, Ayush Raina and Manish Jha. Music for one of the stories was composed by Ilaiyaraja.

The film is produced by Sahara One and is a Whitecloud production.

== Films ==
- "Anjane Dost", directed by Jahnu Barua
- "Bombay Mumbai Same Shit", directed by Rahul Dholakia
- "Urge", directed by Rituparno Ghosh
- "10 minutes", directed by Shashanka Ghosh
- "And It Rained", directed by Manish Jha
- "Pramod Bhai 23", directed by Anurag Kashyap
- "The Ball", directed by Sudhir Mishra
- "Jo Palti Nahin Woh Rickshaw Kya", directed by Ruchi Narain
- "Bombay High", directed by Ayush Raina
- "Parcel", directed by Revathi
- "Hero", directed by Kundan Shah

== Release ==
Mumbai Cutting had its world premier on 27 April 2008 at ArcLight Hollywood as the closing film of 2008 Indian Film Festival of Los Angeles, thereafter it was also the closing film of the 10th Osian Film Festival in July 2008, though it was commercially unreleased.
