= Kriti Malhotra =

Indian actress

Kriti Malhotra is a Bollywood actress and costume designer who appeared in Dhobi Ghat and Peddlers.

== Filmography ==
Year	Title	Language	Role	Other notes
2020	A Suitable Boy	English	Chandni	
2012	Peddlers	Hindi	Bilkis	
2011	Dhobi Ghat	Hindi	Yasmin Noor	
