= Pagglait =

Comedy drama film by Umesh Bist

- Netflix release poster
- Directed by: Umesh Bist
- Written by: Umesh Bist
- Produced by: Shobha Kapoor; Ekta Kapoor; Guneet Monga; Achin Jain
- Starring: Sanya Malhotra; Ashutosh Rana; Shruti Sharma; Raghubir Yadav; Rajesh Tailang
- Cinematography: Rafey Mehmood
- Edited by: Prerna Saigal
- Music by: Arijit Singh
- Production companies: Balaji Motion Pictures; Sikhya Entertainment
- Distributed by: Netflix
- Release date: 26 March 2021
- Running time: 115 minutes
- Country: India
- Language: Hindi

Pagglait is a 2021 Indian Hindi-language black comedy drama film written and directed by Umesh Bist. The film was produced by Shobha Kapoor, Ekta Kapoor, Guneet Monga and Achin Jain under the banners Balaji Motion Pictures and Sikhya Entertainment. The film features Sanya Malhotra, Sayani Gupta, Ashutosh Rana, Sheeba Chadha, Shruti Sharma and Raghubir Yadav.

The film follows a young widow as she learns how to face the family and was released on 26 March 2021 on Netflix.

At the 2021 Filmfare OTT Awards, Pagglait received 3 nominations, including Best Actress in a Web Original Film (Malhotra) and Best Supporting Actress in a Web Original Film (Sayani Gupta), and won Best Supporting Actor in a Web Original Film (Rana).

== Plot ==
A young widow, Sandhya, and her in-laws are dealing with the loss of her husband, Astik, who died after just five months of marriage. Astik's parents, Usha and Shivendra, are deeply saddened by the sudden loss of their eldest son, on whom they were financially dependent. The family suffers even more when their relatives come to the house and create a mess. Amidst a house full of grieving relatives, Sandhya yawns through the social media condolence posts and "copy-paste" comments for Astik. Her attitude leaves some puzzled and others miffed. A relative, Ghanashyam, suggests she is suffering from PTSD. When Sandhya's best friend Nazia comes to support her, Sandhya confesses to her that she does not feel anything for the loss of her husband. To get away from the mourning family, she sneaks away with Nazia for a feast of 'golgappe', even as Astik's younger brother Alok performs the necessary funeral rituals at the river.

Sandhya and Astik were never really a close couple in the few months they shared. While looking for Astik's documents for the bank claim, Sandhya finds a photo of a girl in the closet. Sandhya feels anger towards her dead husband thinking he was cheating on her. When Astik's colleagues visit her to offer condolences, she finds the girl from the photo, Aakanksha. Sandhya confronts her in private about her affair. Aakanksha states that she and Astik were deeply in love since college and they both worked in the same company. But he never cheated on his wife, and that they were together until Astik married Sandhya. They could not get married as her parents did not agree to their union. Sandhya finds this hard to believe. The two, however, grow close as she tries to learn more about Astik from Aakanksha.

Meanwhile, members of the family react strongly when it is revealed that Astik had signed an insurance policy for INR 50 lakhs, of which Sandhya is the sole nominee. Shivendra's brothers Tarun, Ghanshyam, and Pappu convince him to use the insurance money for repaying his own bank loans, and he unwillingly tries to replace Sandhya with himself and Usha as nominees. Shivendra and Usha, still grieving the loss of their son, try to come to terms with the family's proposal that Sandhya should be married off to Astik's paternal cousin, Tarun's son Aditya, who is unemployed and failing to manage money for his hotel business.

Sandhya asks Aditya why he wants to marry her. He says he is in love with her, which touches her heart and she accepts the proposal. This angers her parents and Alok, who is also in love with her. On the 13th day of Astik's funeral, Aditya leaves hastily. His parents tell everyone that Sandhya told him that she was pregnant with Astik's child. It is revealed by Aditya's sister, Aditi, that Sandhya lied about her pregnancy to test Aditya's love for her. Sandhya goes missing from the house after the funeral.

Sandhya, meanwhile, is ready to begin a new life with a new job in a new city. Even after being a topper in her M.A. class, her family never let her settle for a job. She shares how since childhood, the main focus of her parents was to marry her off, without any concern for her independence. Seeing Aakanksha working a job, she becomes motivated to work, and become financially independent. She realises that if she had stayed back, she could never live her own life; because in a patriarchal society, other people make decisions for women.

Eventually, in three separate letters to Usha, her mother, Alka, and Alok, Sandhya bids goodbye to her in-laws. Shivendra finds a cheque for the full insurance money, which Sandhya left for him as she believed he'd need it more than her. She also promises to support her in-laws as her husband did.

Sandhya meets with Aakanksha one last time and apologises for her earlier outburst, and gives her the photograph Astik had kept in his book. In the end, she travels on a bus, ready to face life afresh.

== Cast ==
- Sanya Malhotra as Sandhya Giri (née Pandey), Astik's widow
- Ashutosh Rana as Shivendra Giri, Astik's father
- Sheeba Chaddha as Usha Giri, Astik's mother
- Chetan Sharma as Alok Giri, Astik's younger brother
- Natasha Rastogi as Alka Pandey, Sandhya's mother
- Bhupesh Pandya as Girish Pandey, Sandhya's father
- Sayani Gupta as Aakansha Roy, Astik's colleague and ex-girlfriend
- Shruti Sharma as Nazia Zaidi, Sandhya's friend
- Raghubir Yadav as Pappu Giri, referred to as Tayyaji; Shivendra's elder brother
- Aasif Khan as Parchun, a neighbour of the Giris
- Yamini Singh as Janaki Giri, Shivendra's sister
- Jameel Khan as Ghanshyam, Janaki's husband, who is a banker
- Rajesh Tailang as Tarun Giri, Shivendra's younger brother
- Ananya Khare as Rashmi Giri, Tarun's wife
- Meghna Malik as Tulika, Shivendra's sister-in-law
- Tawhid Rike Zaman as Sandhya's friend
- Nakul Roshan Sahdev as Aditya Giri, Tarun's son
- Sharib Hashmi as B.K. Arora
- Ashlesha Thakur as Aditi Giri, Tarun's daughter
- Sachin Chaudhary as Tulika's son
- Saroj Singh as Dadi Amma, Astik's paternal grandmother
- Unknown as Astik Giri, Sandhya's late husband (mentioned only)

== Production ==
The principal photography commenced in Lucknow on 21 November 2019 and wrapped up on 12 January 2020.

== Soundtrack ==
The film marked the debut of playback singer Arijit Singh as a music director. The soundtrack features 24 tracks, with a compilation of eight songs, and four different renditions of the tracks, with 12 instrumentals. All songs had vocals accompanied by female singers, in connection with the theme and storyline. Neelesh Misra wrote the lyrics for all the tracks, after a four-year long hiatus since 2017. The album released on 10 March 2021, through Singh's record label Oriyon Music, and garnered positive response for the compositions, fusing of genres and choice of singers, but criticism directed on the length of the soundtrack album.

== Reception ==
Pagglait received mixed to positive reviews from critics. On the review aggregator website Rotten Tomatoes, 77% of 13 critics' reviews are positive, with an average rating of 6/10.

Certain audiences noted that the film had similarities with Seema Pahwa's directorial debut Ramprasad Ki Tehrvi. Speaking about the film, Pahwa stated that this was due to both films having a similar setting.

She went on to commend the actors' performances, especially Malhotra's, but objected to the fact that the film portrayed humour in a family at a time when they had just lost a young member.

== Awards and nominations ==
Award (Note: Awards, festivals and organisations are in alphabetical order.)	Year (Note: Date is linked to the article about the awards held that year, wherever possible.)	Category	Recipient(s)	Result	Ref.
Asian Academy Creative Awards	3 December 2021	Best Original Screenplay	Umesh Bist	Won	
Asian Academy Creative Awards	3 December 2021	Best Sound	Pagglait	Won	
Filmfare OTT Awards	9 December 2021	Best Actress in a Web Original Film	Sanya Malhotra	Nominated	
Filmfare OTT Awards	9 December 2021	Best Supporting Actor in a Web Original Film	Ashutosh Rana	Won	
Filmfare OTT Awards	9 December 2021	Best Supporting Actress in a Web Original Film	Sayani Gupta	Nominated	
FOI Online Awards	15 January 2022	Best Feature Film	Pagglait	Nominated	
FOI Online Awards	15 January 2022	Best Original Screenplay	Umesh Bist	Nominated	
FOI Online Awards	15 January 2022	Best Dialogues	Umesh Bist	Won	
FOI Online Awards	15 January 2022	Best Actress in a Leading Role	Sanya Malhotra	Nominated	
FOI Online Awards	15 January 2022	Best Actor in a Supporting Role	Ashutosh Rana	Won	
FOI Online Awards	15 January 2022	Best Actress in a Supporting Role	Sheeba Chaddha	Nominated	
FOI Online Awards	15 January 2022	Best Performance by an Ensemble Cast	Cast of Pagglait	Nominated	
FOI Online Awards	15 January 2022	Best Music Direction – Songs	Arijit Singh	Nominated	
FOI Online Awards	15 January 2022	Best Original Song	“Phire Faqeera” – Arijit Singh, Neelesh Misra, Raja Kumari & Amrita Singh	Won	
FOI Online Awards	15 January 2022	Best Original Song	“Thode Kam Ajnabi” – Arijit Singh, Neelesh Misra & Himani Kapoor	Nominated	
FOI Online Awards	15 January 2022	Best Playback Singer – Female	Himani Kapoor – “Thode Kam Ajnabi”	Won	
FOI Online Awards	15 January 2022	Best Lyricist	Neelesh Misra – “Phire Faqeera”	Won	
FOI Online Awards	15 January 2022	Best Lyricist	Neelesh Misra – “Thode Kam Ajnabi”	Nominated	
