= Badlapur Boys =

- Movie Poster
- Directed by: Shailesh Verma
- Written by: Suseenthiran
- Produced by: Satish Pillangwad
- Starring: Nishan; Saranya Mohan; Annu Kapoor; Puja Gupta
- Cinematography: Sanket Shah
- Edited by: A. Muthu
- Music by: Sameer Anjaan; Shamir Tandon; Sachin Gupta; Raju Sardar
- Production company: Karrm Movies
- Release date: 12 December 2014
- Running time: 123 minutes
- Country: India
- Language: Hindi

Badlapur Boys is a 2014 Hindi-language sports drama film directed by Shailesh Verma and produced by A. Muthu and Salim Tanwar. It stars Nishan, Saranya Mohan, Annu Kapoor and Puja Gupta in lead roles. Ankit (Saurabh) Sharma played the character of Deenu in this film. The film is about a team of Kabaddi players in a family romantic drama with sports as a backdrop. It is a remake of the Tamil hit film Vennila Kabadi Kuzhu. Bollywood editor A. Muthu, who has edited more than 50 films (including Sadak, Deewana, Balwan, Raja Babu, Judwa, Ziddi, Haseena Maan Jaayegi), obtained the remake rights of the Tamil film and produced this film.

== Cast ==
- Nishan as Vijay
- Sushant Kandya as Rajkumar
- Saranya Mohan as Sapna
- Ankit (Sourabh) Sharma as Deenu
- Annu Kapoor as Surajbhan Singh
- Puja Gupta as Manjari
- Anupam Maanav as Dr. O.P Malhotra
- Kishori Shahane
- Aman Verma
- Preet Saluja as Sajid
- Boloram Das as Sadhu

== Synopsis ==
The story centres on Vijay, a child whose village has been long deprived of water for irrigation. Vijay's father threatens the bureaucracy with self-immolation if the village's basic need for water is not fulfilled. To set an example, the father sets himself ablaze before the villagers and the media. As fate would have it, his sacrifice is forgotten and instead his family is affected. Vijay grows up with the dream that one day, he will come face to face with the bureaucracy with a simple request; that his village 'Badlapur' receives government's attention to solve their water crisis. Vijay then performs in a kabaddi competition in hopes of making a change, but punctures his rib and dies, but wins the competition. His coach then bring this fact in public and the government finally agrees to these demands and the village have water for irrigation once again.

== Soundtrack ==
No.	Title	Singer(s)	Length
1.	"Badlapur Boys"	Sukhwinder Singh	4:34
2.	"Jhinka Chika"	Ritu Pathak	2:34
3.	"More Saiyyan"	Shreya Ghoshal, Javed Ali	6:03
4.	"Do Akhiyyan"	Shaan, Mahalakshmi Iyer

== Box office ==
Badlapur Boys opened with 16 lakhs box office earnings on its opening day. The first weekend box office of the movie was approximately 43 lakhs INR. The lifetime revenues from this movie was 89 lakhs INR. Although the movie did not face tough competition, the film still was not able to garner much success.
