= Tigers (2014 film) =

2014 Indian drama film

- Theatrical release poster
- Directed by: Danis Tanović
- Written by: Darab Farooqui
- Screenplay by: Danis Tanović; Andy Paterson
- Story by: Danis Tanović
- Produced by: Prashita Chaudhary; Kshitij Chaudhary; Guneet Monga; Anurag Kashyap; Cedomir Kolar; Marc Baschet; Andy Paterson; Meraj Shaikh(Supervising Producer); Cat Villiers
- Starring: Emraan Hashmi; Khalid Abdalla; Geetanjali; Supriya Pathak
- Cinematography: Erol Zubcevic
- Edited by: Prerna Saigal
- Music by: JAM8
- Production companies: Sikhya Entertainment; A.S.A.P. Films
- Distributed by: ZEE5
- Release dates: 8 September 2014 (Toronto); 21 November 2018
- Running time: 90 minutes
- Country: India
- Language: Hindi

Tigers (initially titled White Lies) is a 2014 Indian drama film directed by Danis Tanović, and produced as a joint production between Cinema Time, French production company ASAP Films and Sikhya Entertainment.

The film is inspired by an episode in Pakistan during the 1990s, a repetition of the Nestlé baby milk scandal in 1970s that occurred in developing countries. A Pakistani salesman named Syed Aamir Raza Hussain became a whistle-blower against his former employer Nestlé; in 1999, two years after he left Nestlé, Hussain released a report in association with the non-profit organisation International Baby Food Action Network, in which he alleged that Nestlé was encouraging doctors to push its infant formula products over breastfeeding.

The film features Emraan Hashmi in the leading role as Ayan, based on Hussain, a pharmaceutical representative in Pakistan who discovers his new company's baby formula has killed hundreds of children, after which he begins a lone and dangerous battle against the company. The film began filming in 2013 in Punjab, India, and had its premiere in September 2014 at the 2014 Toronto International Film Festival.

The film faced multiple delays during its initial release. After Tanovic decided to fictionalise Raza's battle, he renamed Nestlé as Lasta in the film and cast Hashmi after watching Shanghai (2012). Tigers was publicly released on the streaming platform ZEE5 on 21 November 2018.

== Cast ==
- Emraan Hashmi as Ayan
- Geetanjali as Zainab, Ayan's wife
- Danny Huston as Alex
- Khalid Abdalla as Nadeem
- Adil Hussain as Bilal, Ayan's boss
- Maryam d'Abo as Maggie
- Satyadeep Mishra as Dr. Faiz
- Heino Ferch as Robert
- Sam Reid as Frank
- Supriya Pathak as Taslima, Ayan's mother
- Vinod Nagpal as Mustafa, Ayan's father
- Ashwath Bhatt as Dr Saleem
- Rubina as Nurse
- Benjamin Gilani as Col Malik
- Inayat Sood as Nurse 1
- Kanwal Baidwan as Nurse
- Milind Raja as Nader
- Sanjay Panchal as Sanjay

== See also ==
- Nestlé Pakistan
