= Good Bad Films =

Film production company

- Formerly: Anurag Kashyap Films; AKFPL
- Type: Private
- Industry: Motion picture
- Founded: 2005
- Founder: Anurag Kashyap
- Successor: Phantom Films
- Headquarters: Mumbai, India
- Products: Film production

Good Bad Films (formerly Anurag Kashyap Films and AKFPL) is a film production company based in Mumbai, it was founded by director Anurag Kashyap in 2009. It is known for making art house or new wave cinema in Bollywood, like Dev D (2009), Udaan (2010), Shaitan (2012) and The Lunchbox (2013).

== Filmography ==
Key
| † | Denotes films that have not yet been released |

| Year | Film | Director | Notes |
|---|---|---|---|
| 2010 | Udaan | Vikramaditya Motwane | |
| 2011 | That Girl in Yellow Boots | Anurag Kashyap | |
| 2011 | Shaitan | Bejoy Nambiar | |
| 2011 | Trishna | Michael Winterbottom | |
| 2011 | Michael | Ribhu Dasgupta | |
| 2012 | Gangs of Wasseypur – Part 1 | Anurag Kashyap | |
| 2012 | Gangs of Wasseypur – Part 2 | Anurag Kashyap | |
| 2012 | Chittagong | Bedabrata Pain | |
| 2012 | Aiyyaa | Sachin Kundalkar | |
| 2012 | Luv Shuv Tey Chicken Khurana | Sameer Sharma | |
| 2013 | Shorts | Shlok Sharma; Siddharth Gupt; Anirban Roy; Rohit Pandey; Neeraj Ghaywan | |
| 2013 | Tasher Desh | Q | |
| 2013 | The Lunchbox | Ritesh Batra | |
| 2013 | Shahid | Hansal Mehta | |
| 2013 | Peddlers | Vasan Bala | |
| 2026 | Kennedy | Anurag Kashyap | |
| 2026 | Little Thomas | Kaushal Oza | |
