= That Girl in Yellow Boots =

- Directed by: Anurag Kashyap
- Written by: Anurag Kashyap; Kalki Koechlin
- Produced by: Anurag Kashyap; Guneet Monga; Shibani Keshkamat Tait
- Starring: Kalki Koechlin; Naseeruddin Shah
- Cinematography: Rajeev Ravi
- Edited by: Shweta Venkat Matthew
- Music by: Naren Chandavarkar; Benedict Taylor
- Production companies: Viacom18 Motion Pictures; Sikhya Entertainment; NFDC
- Distributed by: Viacom18 Motion Pictures
- Release dates: September 2010 (Toronto); 2 September 2011 (India)
- Running time: 99 minutes
- Country: India
- Language: Hindi

That Girl in Yellow Boots is a 2010 Indian thriller film directed by Anurag Kashyap and co-written by Kalki Koechlin. It stars Kalki Koechlin, Naseeruddin Shah and Gulshan Devaiya. The film tells the story of Ruth, a British expat, who has come to India to find her estranged dad.

The film was first screened at the Toronto International Film Festival in September 2010, and later at the Venice Film Festival and the South Asian International Film Festival. It was commercially released the next year on September, 2011, in India and the U.S.

== Plot ==
Ruth Edscer (Kalki Koechlin), a British-Indian woman, arrives in Mumbai searching for her father, Arjun Patel, who had abandoned her family when she was a kid. Except for a letter that he had once sent, she has no official documents of his existence. She visits government offices in an attempt to track him down but encounters bureaucratic hurdle and dead ends. With limited money, she takes a job at a massage parlour where she secretly offers illicit services to male clients willing to pay extra.

Ruth is in a volatile relationship with Prashant, a drug addict who frequently manipulates her for money. He owes a large sum to a local gangster named Chittiappa, who soon takes an interest in Ruth. Chittiappa pressures her to help cover Prashant’s debt and begins to assert control over her, pretending to be a protector while making unwanted advances. Meanwhile, Ruth continues her search for Arjun, visiting hospitals, churches, and neighbourhoods where he might have lived, but she finds no clear answers.

One day, she receives a promising lead that directs her to an address where a man named Arjun Patel resides. She arrives and meets an older man who reacts strangely upon seeing her. She explains who she is and why she has been looking for him. At first, he refuses to acknowledge her, but as the conversation continues, he confirms that he is indeed her father. However, he remains distant and does not offer her any explanation for his disappearance.

As their discussion unfolds, Ruth learns that Arjun had sexually abused her elder sister years ago (having only married her mother to get close to her). Her sister later died by suicide after becoming pregnant. Confronted with this information, Ruth listens as he offers no denial or justification. He does not express regret, nor does he attempt to reconcile with her.

Ruth leaves his house and returns to her life in Mumbai. She continues working at the massage parlour, but something inside her has shifted. Prashant tries to reestablish control over her, but she rejects him. When Chittiappa contacts her again, she refuses to engage. The film ends with Ruth despondently returning to Britain and alone in the city, moving forward without any clear resolution but with the knowledge of the truth she went searching for.

== Cast ==
- Kalki Koechlin as Ruth
- Naseeruddin Shah as Diwakar
- Gulshan Devaiah as Chittiappa
- Shiv Kumar Subramaniam as Peter
- Mushtaq Khan
- Ronit Roy (Cameo)
- Makrand Deshpande (Cameo)
- Piyush Mishra (Cameo)
- Rajat Kapoor (Cameo)
- Divya Jagdal as Divya
- Kumud Mishra as Lynn
- Prashant Prakash as Prashant
- Pooja Swaroop as Maya
- Kartik Krishnan

== Production ==
=== Development ===
Lead actress Kalki Koechlin who also co-wrote the film with Anurag Kashyap mentioned, "A lot of these characters were based loosely on figures that I had seen growing up in India ...Growing up as a white-skinned woman in India, I was always the odd one out – there was a certain alienation that came with that, and you end up alienating yourself because everyone comes to you like the white girl, the easy, "Baywatch," loose-moraled white girl."

Kashyap asked Koechlin to write the first scene, to get a female perspective on the treatment of white women at Indian government offices as she personally experienced the objectification. He also wanted to explore the theme of child abuse; he had previously played the role of child abuser in I Am (2010) by Onir, and he himself had been a victim of child abuse for 11 years. At the writing stage Koechlin and Kashyap disagreed on the ending initially, as Koechlin wanted an optimistic ending, unlike Kashyap who wanted to portray that "...you don't always get solutions to your problems".

The film had difficulty finding funding because it dealt with controversial themes like child abuse and drug addiction and "differed so vastly from his previous work". As Kashyap put it, "I wanted to break the formula that many directors and actors find themselves in."

=== Filming ===
The film was shot in just 13 days. It was primarily framed in tight spaces, like apartments, massage parlours, and rickshaws leading to a "claustrophobic sense of unease that permeates the entire film". Many of the cast members had previously worked together in theatre productions; this familiarity allowed the director to shoot the film in a shorter period of time. He admitted that he never "directed" any of the actors during the filming, saying "I've never told any actor what to do, only what not to do. You have to trust your actors, and I know mine inside and out." He found the entire filming emotionally draining and tough, especially because it was made mostly on borrowed money.

== Release ==
After travelling to 2010 Toronto International Film Festival, 67th Venice International Film Festival in September 2010 and International Film Festival of Los Angeles (IFFLA), at its New York premiere on 24 August 2011, at the Asia Society, director Anurag Kashyap said, "I hope you feel the film, because you will not enjoy it." The film's commercial release, however, took over a year as it was delayed to coincide with its US release to avoid internet piracy. Indian distributors were not keen on the film, as without big Bollywood stars they did not find it viable for an international release; they mainly cater to an NRI (Non-resident Indian) audience. Finally US based-distributor IndiePix Films came on board for paving the way for a US release with 30 prints, all in non-NRI theatres, a rare feat for a Bollywood film. Meanwhile, the film was also sold in Scandinavian countries, Turkey, Southern Europe, and New Zealand. Its satellite rights were sold in many countries. The film thus became Kashyap's first worldwide release, as it was released in 40 US theatres on 2 September by IndiePix Films, on the same day of its India release. Previously, after its showing at the London Indian Film Festival, Britain-based Mara Pictures picked up the film there for UK release in last quarter of 2011. Kashyap later told BBC News that he received a negative backlash from financial backers because of the film's sexual content: "A lot of people involved with the film were embarrassed about the film. A lot of people we thanked in the film who actually lent us money, they said, 'Please take our names from the film,' because they don't want somebody to see and say 'You gave the money to make this film!'" That Girl in Yellow Boots is one of the few Indian films released without an interval.

=== Marketing ===
Prior to its India release, the first look of the film was unveiled to the press on 11 August 2011. MTV India started a "That Girl with Yellow Boots contest" asking for audition tapes from aspiring actors, the winner of which would act in future Anurag Kashyap's films. In the run up to the film, its lead Kalki Koechlin appeared at an event, colour-coordinated, complete with yellow boots.

== Critical reception ==
The film opened to mostly positive reviews. Roger Ebert of the Chicago Sun-times gave it 3.5 out of the 4 stars, and he also noted that ' The film's value is in its portrait of Ruth, and her independence as a solo outsider in a vast, uncaring city. ' In his Huffington Post review, Kia Makarechi wrote, "an unnervingly realistic portrait of unimaginable pain – is one with an ending you'll wish you could forget." Nupur Barua of fullhyd.com rated it 7 out of 10, and said that besides the Kashyap-esque tone of despair and melancholy, That Girl in Yellow Boots is Anurag Kashyap's best until date, adding that you can watch it "only if you can handle the unspeakable". Parmita Borah, on EF News International, wrote, "Kalki Koechlin carries That Girl in Yellow Boots on her shoulders and does so with great panache and élan." Shivesh Kumar of IndiaWeekly awarded the movie 3.5 out of 5 stars.
