= The Lunchbox =

2013 Indian film by Ritesh Batra

- Theatrical release poster
- Directed by: Ritesh Batra
- Written by: Ritesh Batra
- Produced by: Anurag Kashyap; Guneet Monga; Arun Rangachari
- Starring: Irrfan Khan; Nimrat Kaur; Bharti Achrekar; Nakul Vaid; Nawazuddin Siddiqui
- Cinematography: Michael Simmonds
- Edited by: John F. Lyons
- Music by: Max Richter
- Production companies: DAR Motion Pictures; NFDC; Essel Vision Productions; Sikhya Entertainment; AKFPL; The Match Factory; Rohfilm; ASAP Films; Arte France Cinéma; Medienboard Berlin Brandenburg; Aide Aux Cinemas Du Monde; CNC; Ministère des Affaires étrangères Institut Français
- Distributed by: UTV Motion Pictures; Dharma Productions (India); Sony Pictures Classics (United States and Canada); NFP Marketing & Distribution (Germany); Happiness Distribution (France)
- Release dates: 19 May 2013 (Cannes); 20 September 2013 (India)
- Running time: 105 Minutes
- Countries: India; United States; Germany; France
- Languages: Hindi; English
- Budget: ₹22 crore
- Box office: ₹100.02 crore

The Lunchbox is a 2013 slice of life drama film written and directed by Ritesh Batra. Produced by Guneet Monga, Anurag Kashyap and Arun Rangachari, The Lunchbox is an international co-production of studios in India, the US, Germany and France. It stars Irrfan Khan and Nimrat Kaur alongside Nawazuddin Siddiqui, Bharti Achrekar and Nakul Vaid in supporting roles.

The Lunchbox was screened at Critics' Week at the 2013 Cannes Film Festival, and later won the Critics' Week Viewers Choice Award also known as Grand Rail d'Or. It was shown at the 2013 Toronto International Film Festival. The film was released in theatres in India on 20 September 2013. The Lunchbox was a box-office success and received unanimous critical acclaim. It was Khan's highest-grossing Hindi film, until it was surpassed by Hindi Medium (2017). The Lunchbox was nominated for Best Film Not in the English Language at the 2015 British Academy Film Awards.

== Plot ==
Ila is a young housewife seeking the attention of her husband, Rajeev, and searching for ways to bring the romance back into her marriage; one of her ideas is to cook delicious lunches for him. Through a rare mix-up of the dabbawalas (a complicated food delivery system in Mumbai that picks up and delivers lunches from restaurants or homes to people at work), the tiffin carrier (lunchbox) Ila prepares for her husband gets accidentally delivered instead, to Saajan Fernandes, a middle-aged widower who is about to retire from his job of an accountant. Ila eventually realises the mistake and with the advice of her neighbour aunt, Mrs. Deshpande, living in the apartment above her, writes a letter to Saajan about the mix-up and places it in the lunchbox (along with her husband's favourite meal) the next day. An exchange of letters sent back and forth with the lunches ignites a friendship between the two, as they share memories and events from their own lives.

At work, Saajan is tasked with training his replacement, Aslam Shaikh. Socially distant after his wife's death, Saajan is initially reluctant to interact with Shaikh and train him. After Shaikh reveals that he is an orphan who taught himself accounting, Saajan gradually warms up to him, and eventually the duo strike a close friendship. At one point, Saajan saves Shaikh's job by covering for his blatant mistakes and becomes the best man at his marriage with Mehrunissa. Meanwhile, Ila discovers that Rajeev is having an extramarital affair and gives up hope of rekindling her marriage. In one of the lunchbox letters, she suggests moving to Bhutan where the cost of living is much cheaper than India. Saajan writes back with the suggestion that the two move there together. Ila then offers to meet in person at a popular restaurant but at the appointed time, Saajan does not show up. Upon receiving an empty lunchbox in disappointment the next day, Saajan writes back to the dejected Ila and apologises to her, stating that he did arrive and watched her from a distance, but could not approach her. He explains how young and beautiful she looked, while surmising that he is too old for her and advising her to move on.

Some time later, Ila's father, battling lung cancer, dies in the care of her mother, who confesses how unhappy her marriage was. She gives Ila the advice "Sometimes, the wrong train takes us to the right station". Ila receives the address of Saajan's office from the dabbawalas only to learn from Shaikh that he has already retired and headed to Nashik. She writes a farewell message to Saajan announcing that she has decided to leave Rajeev and move to Bhutan with her young daughter, Yashvi. Meanwhile, Saajan changes his mind en route to Nashik and returns to Mumbai. The film ends with Ila waiting for Yashvi to return from school and Saajan heading to her house with the dabbawala who regularly picked up and delivered the lunchbox.

== Cast ==
- Irrfan Khan as Saajan Fernandes
- Nimrat Kaur as Ila Singh
- Nawazuddin Siddiqui as Aslam Shaikh, Saajan's colleague
- Lillete Dubey as Ila's mother
- Nakul Vaid as Rajeev Singh, Ila's husband
- Bharati Achrekar as Mrs. Deshpande a.k.a. "Auntie", Ila's neighbour (voice only)
- Yashvi Puneet Nagar as Yashvi Singh, Ila & Rajeev's daughter
- Denzil Smith as Mr. Shroff, Saajan's office boss
- Shruti Bapna as Mehrunissa, Shaikh's wife

== Production ==
=== Development ===
Ritesh Batra, who had made the short films The Morning Ritual, Gareeb Nawaz Ki Taxi and Cafe Regular, Cairo, started researching a documentary on the famous dabbawala Lunchbox delivery system of Mumbai which is known for its efficiency, however after spending a week with them in 2007, he heard many interesting personal stories the workers would overhear while waiting outside apartments. This experience birthed the idea for the film, and instead of making a documentary, he began writing a film script. In time the film became a joint production between Sikhya Entertainment, DAR motion pictures, National Film Development Corporation of India (NFDC), India, ROH Films, Germany, ASAP Films, France and the Cine Mosaic, a production company based in New York City and founded by Lydia Dean Pilcher who had previously produced films such as The Talented Mr Ripley (1999) and The Namesake (2007). Germany's Match Factory became its international sales agent.

=== Writing ===
Batra completed the first draft of the screenplay in 2011. He was assisted by Rutvik Oza. It went on to win an Honorable Jury Mention at the 2012 Cinemart at the Rotterdam International Film Festival. Thereafter the project was part of the Talent Project Market of Berlin International Film Festival and was mentored at the screenwriter's lab (Torino Film Lab) at the Torino Film Festival. The character of Ila played by Nimrat Kaur, six months prior to the shooting, and the character played by Nawazuddin Siddiqui was further developed and improvised during shooting.

=== Casting ===
Irrfan Khan liked the script of the film and the concept of his character, not speaking much but talking through notes. After seeing Batra's short film and having a couple of meetings he agreed to act in the film. Batra wanted to work with Nawazuddin Siddiqui, another principal character in the film, for a long time. For the female lead, auditions were conducted, wherein Nimrat Kaur was selected. Kaur had extensive experience at the Mumbai theatre and had worked in films like Peddlers. Some of the dabbawalas whom the director befriended while researching the film were also cast in minor roles.

=== Filming ===
The film was shot in 2012 in Mumbai at a budget of ₹220 million. Prior to the filming, the cast rehearsed for six months. It was shot using the Arri Alexa digital film camera. Many of the scenes were logistically broken down to make way for last minute location changes. According to Ritesh Batra, scenes on the train involved the use of only one compartment, and even included actual local commuters when needed.

Principal photography lasted 29 days, with a majority of the film's scenes done in three weeks. Afterwards, footage taken in a documentary manner were shot. Mumbai's famous dabbawalas were provided actual lunchboxes to deliver, and followed by a four-member film crew, which filmed the process in documentary style.

== Release and reception ==
=== Screenings and film festivals ===
The film was screened on 19 May 2013 as a part of the Critics' Week at the 2013 Cannes Film Festival, where it received a standing ovation and positive reviews. It won the Critics' Week Viewers Choice Award also known as Grand Rail d'Or. Variety called it "a notable debut from tyro helmer-scripter Ritesh Batra", for creating a film with the "crossover appeal of Monsoon Wedding", and also praised the acting of Irrfan Khan and Nimrat Kaur.

Thereafter, Sony Pictures Classics picked up North American distribution rights.

In India, this film was released on more than 400 screens on 20 September 2013. In Japan, a Japanese dubbed version of the film was released on 9 August 2014, screening in a hundred theaters.

=== Box office ===
The Lunchbox grossed ₹71 million in its first weekend of release in India, and ₹110 million in its first week. The film continued to gross significant amounts over the next few weeks, earning over ₹200 million in the first three weeks and another estimated ₹40–50 lakhs on its fourth weekend.

The Lunchbox Worldwide Box Office
Territories	Gross Revenue	Footfalls	ref.
India	₹282,500,000	20,14,000	
Overseas	US$20,750,000- ₹126.75 Cr		
United States & Canada	US$4,235,151		
Europe	US$11,920,000	1,196,812	
United Kingdom	£493,282	74,400	
France	€3,350,000	481,368	
Germany	€1,436,440	210,418	
Switzerland	CHF 950,000	60,969	
Sweden	kr 3,800,000	43,197	
Italy	€485,000	80,886	
Norway	kr 1,670,000	18,502	
Netherlands	€318,000	42,897	
Austria	€177,860	23,804	
Belgium	€154,085	17,417	
Finland	€77,740	8,533	
Spain	€133,676	22,303	
Portugal	€79,610	15,323	
Poland	485,000zł	26,718	
Denmark	kr. 800,000	10,173	
Hungary	18,575,000 Ft	13,950	
Slovenia	€41,000	8,306	
Slovakia	€12,900	2,532	
Bulgaria	лв. 56,700	6,764	
Czech Republic	1,940,000 Kč	13,047	
Greece	€62,600	9,711	
Turkey	₺50,743	5,594	
Latin America	US$646,625		
Argentina	AR$1,977,831		
Brazil	R$272,572		
Colombia	COL$239,381,792		
Mexico	Mex$1,885,972		
Peru			
Uruguay			
Asia & Pacific	US$3,687,000		
Australia	A$1,554,000		
Japan	¥150,000,000		
South Korea	₩108,991,000		
Taiwan	NT$888,050		
Thailand			
Singapore			
New Zealand	NZ$431,109		
Hong Kong	HK$1,435,851		
Worldwide	₹1,550,000,000		

In the United States, The Lunchbox grossed $4.23 million, and was 2014's third highest grossing foreign film behind Cantinflas and P.K.. By 28 May 2014, the film's worldwide collection was ₹84.92 crore. The film's total worldwide gross for the original Hindi version was ₹100.85 crore ($17.24 million). Most of its gross was from overseas with $11.71 million (₹72.602 crore) for the Hindi version, becoming 2013's third highest-grossing Indian film overseas after Dhoom 3 and Chennai Express. It was Irrfan Khan's highest-grossing Hindi film, up until it was surpassed by Hindi Medium (2017).

In France, it collected over €3,350,000 making it one of the top 5 Indian movies of all time in France.It was followed by Germany with €1,436,440

The Japanese dubbed version, released later in 2014, screened in a hundred theaters for ten weeks. The film grossed over ¥150 million ($1.42 million or ₹8.7 crore) in Japan. Combined, All versions grossed an estimated $20.8 million (₹127 crore) overseas and ₹155 crore (US$25 million) worldwide.

=== Critical reception ===
The Lunchbox received universal critical acclaim from critics and audiences. On the review aggregator website Rotten Tomatoes, 97% of 120 critics' reviews are positive, with an average rating of 7.7/10. The website's consensus reads: "Warm, affectionate, and sweet but not cloying, The Lunchbox is a clever crowd-pleaser from first-time director Ritesh Batra." Metacritic, which uses a weighted average, assigned the film a score of 76 out of 100, based on 28 critics, indicating "generally favorable" reviews.

Critic Rajeev Masand of CNN-IBN gave the film a rating of 5 out of 5 stating, "The greatest love stories are the ones that make you root for the protagonists to come together, despite their destinies. This film illustrates how love transforms the unlikeliest of people." Pratim D. Gupta of The Telegraph gave The Lunchbox two thumbs up calling it "as much a moving and muted love story as it is an evocative portrayal of loneliness." Taran Adarsh of Bollywood Hungama gave the movie a 4 out of 5 rating, stating "A well-told old-fashioned romance, The Lunchbox gracefully unknots the trials, tribulations, fears and hopes of everyday people sans the glamour that the city of Mumbai has become synonymous with." Karan Anshuman of Mumbai Mirror also gave the film a perfect 5 out of 5 saying the film was, "one of the best films to come out of India in a long time."

Raja Sen of Rediff.com also praised the film, giving it 5 out of 5 and offering particular compliments to the director Ritesh Batra, stating "Batra, who has also written The Lunchbox, has allowed his smashing actors tremendous room to improvise, all the while himself sketching in nuanced details about the city, its food-ferriers, and the many disparities Mumbai is crammed with." Filmmaker/critic Khalid Mohammed of the Deccan Chronicle said "What stays in the mind at the end of The Lunchbox is pretty much what stays in mind at the end of a memorable set by jazzmen – not their lapses but the heights they scale." Aditya Grover of YouthTimes gave it 4 out of 5 stars and said, "The Lunchbox is delicious and delightful! If you're in the mood to witness genuinely moving cinema, you're in for a treat. The delectable taste of this lunchbox remains in your mouth much after you've left the theatre. Go for it!" Suparna Sharma of The Asian Age gave it 4 out of 5 stars and said: "The Lunchbox is a gently pulsating sweet-sad story of loneliness and love, of wilting spirits finding water again. There are three women in three marriages in this film, of which two are ailing. The third one is over, almost, only the last rites haven't been performed. There are two men in the film – one who has lived a full life and is getting ready to quietly slip off the face of the earth; the other is eager to begin… What's both shocking and soothing is what the film shows us — that it takes very little for a soul to come back to life. Mostly, just a hint of hope will do."

Trisha Gupta in the Sunday Guardian wrote "The Lunchbox is a lovely little film. But it does tick all the boxes that might appeal to festival audiences: quaint Asian urbanism (Mumbai trains, dabba delivery), Indian home-cooking, romance. It provides local colour, without being demandingly untranslatable." In a less positive review for the Chicago Reader, J. R. Jones criticized the film's premise as a gimmick and its purported use of an "irritating comic foil" in reference to Nawazuddin Siddiqui's and Bharati Achrekar's characters as Shaikh and Mrs. Deshpande, respectively.

=== Oscar selection controversy ===
The Lunchbox was considered by many people to be a lock as India's selection for the 86th Academy Awards Best Foreign Film Category, with many critics enthusiastically praising it and voting for it to serve as India's nomination. Director Karan Johar also put his support behind the film saying "All kinds of audience can connect with it and yet within the parameters of love story it is completely unusual. You feel all the love in the world for the protagonists and the unusual aspect of it is they haven't met."

However, the selection committee of the Film Federation of India (FFI) deliberated on 17 September 2013 and decided to send the Gujarati film The Good Road instead. This decision sparked outrage from many supporters of The Lunchbox, including its cast and crew. The film's producer Anurag Kashyap quickly took to Twitter and expressed his disgust, saying "I don't know who the Federation is, but it goes to show the complete lack of understanding to make films that can travel across borders." He later deleted both his Twitter and Facebook accounts, saying, "this is a moment of defeat for me, and for independent cinema, because, for once, our chances were great." Karan Johar also said he felt very disappointed that such a wonderful chance at Oscar glory with The Lunchbox was spoiled. Guneet Monga, The Lunchbox's other producer, said she was flabbergasted as to how the Federation could select a movie that didn't even have an American distributor, and also listed the number of global festivals and appreciation her film received, concluding that it sadly and supposedly "wasn't enough for the FFI".

In an interview with Siddharth Sivakumar of Tinpahar, Goutam Ghose, the chairman of the committee blamed the decision on the media and a backlash based on the hurt pride of the selection committee, revealing:

Personally I liked The Lunch Box [sic] (Note: The article in Tinpahar chose to print the name of the titular object in the film as two words, Lunch Box, throughout the article. Also, beyond the first mention, Ghose dropped the The from the title as he discussed the film, though this is simply shortening during a discussion, not a misspeaking of the title. To avoid clutter, [sic] has not been included at all seven mentions in this quote.) very much. But eventually the eighteen member jury supported The Good Road. Now I can say that some people from Bombay felt that the basic premise of The Lunch Box was wrong. Because the Dabbawala never do such mistakes. Films are after all works of fiction, with the right to cinematic liberty! Although Lunch Box was my personal favourite, but as a chairman one should not impose his or her choice on others. And as you know this became suddenly a big controversy. And I think the media was again to some extent responsible for this decision. Because every day during the deliberation or the screenings, the media projected Lunch Box as the chosen one. It's my assumption, that the members probably thought, "My God! If the media has already taken the decision then why we are here?" It was a Chomskian 'manufacturing consent' – Lunch Box, Lunch Box, Lunch Box every day!! So the members, who are all very important people from the industry, had an opposite impulse. I don't know, but maybe that's the way it happened.

Once it had been submitted to the Oscar selection committee, that committee did not nominate, nor shortlist, The Good Road; that year's Academy Award winner was Italy's The Great Beauty.

== Adaptations ==
A musical adaptation based on the film is currently in development. It was commissioned by Lincoln Center Theater and will feature songs co-written by The Lazours. Ritesh Batra is adapting his own script and co-writing lyrics.

In April 2025, it was announced that Rachel Chavkin would direct the world premiere of the musical at Berkeley Repertory Theatre, with an opening in May 2026.

== Accolades ==
Award (Note: Awards, festivals and organizations are in alphabetical order.)	Date of ceremony (Note: Date is linked to the article about the awards held that year, wherever possible.)	Category	Recipient(s)	Result	Ref.
Asia-Pacific Film Festival	13 – 15 December 2013	Best Film	Ritesh Batra	Nominated	
Asia-Pacific Film Festival	13 – 15 December 2013	Best Director	Ritesh Batra	Nominated	
Asia-Pacific Film Festival	13 – 15 December 2013	Best Screenplay	Ritesh Batra	Won	
Asia-Pacific Film Festival	13 – 15 December 2013	Best Actor	Irrfan Khan	Nominated	
Asia-Pacific Film Festival	13 – 15 December 2013	Outstanding Achievement Award	Irrfan Khan	Won	
Asia-Pacific Film Festival	13 – 15 December 2013	Best Actress	Nimrat Kaur	Nominated	
Asia-Pacific Film Festival	13 – 15 December 2013	Best Supporting Actor	Nawazuddin Siddiqui	Won	
Asia Pacific Screen Awards	15 December 2013	Best Screenplay	Ritesh Batra	Won	
Asia Pacific Screen Awards	15 December 2013	Jury Grand Prize	Ritesh Batra	Won	
Asian Film Awards	27 March 2014	Best Film	The Lunchbox	Nominated	
Asian Film Awards	27 March 2014	Best Actor	Irrfan Khan	Won	
Asian Film Awards	27 March 2014	Best Screenwriter	Ritesh Batra	Won	
British Academy Film Awards	8 February 2015	Best Film Not in the English Language	Ritesh Batra	Nominated	
Dubai International Film Festival	6 – 14 December 2013	Best Film – Feature	Anurag Kashyap, Arun Rangachari, Guneet Monga	Nominated	
Dubai International Film Festival	6 – 14 December 2013	Special Mention – Feature	Ritesh Batra	Won	
Dubai International Film Festival	6 – 14 December 2013	Best Actor – Feature	Irrfan Khan	Won	
Filmfare Awards	26 January 2014	Best Film (Critics)	Ritesh Batra	Won	
Filmfare Awards	26 January 2014	Best Debut Director	Ritesh Batra	Won	
Filmfare Awards	26 January 2014	Best Story	Ritesh Batra	Nominated	
Filmfare Awards	26 January 2014	Best Supporting Actor	Nawazuddin Siddiqui	Won	
Filmfare Awards	26 January 2014	Best Editing	John F. Lyons	Nominated	
Filmfare Awards	26 January 2014	Best Sound Design	Michael Kaczmarek	Nominated	
Ghent International Film Festival	8 – 19 October 2013	Canvas Audience Award	Ritesh Batra	Nominated	
Hong Kong Asian Film Festival	25 October – 19 November 2013	New Talent Award	Ritesh Batra	Nominated	
Critics' Week (Cannes Film Festival)	15 – 26 May 2013	Grand Rail d'Or (Viewers' Choice Award)	The Lunchbox	Won	
International Indian Film Academy Awards	23 – 26 April 2014	Best Actress in a Leading Role	Nimrat Kaur	Nominated	
International Indian Film Academy Awards	23 – 26 April 2014	Best Actor in a Supporting Role	Nawazuddin Siddiqui	Nominated	
International Indian Film Academy Awards	23 – 26 April 2014	Best Story	Ritesh Batra	Nominated	
London Film Festival	9 – 20 October 2013	Best Film	Ritesh Batra	Nominated	
Oslo Films from the South Festival	10 – 20 October 2013	Best Feature Film	Ritesh Batra	Nominated	
Producers Guild Film Awards	16 January 2014	Best Film	Anurag Kashyap, Arun Rangachari, Guneet Monga	Nominated	
Producers Guild Film Awards	16 January 2014	Best Director	Ritesh Batra	Nominated	
Producers Guild Film Awards	16 January 2014	Best Debut Director	Ritesh Batra	Won	
Producers Guild Film Awards	16 January 2014	Best Story	Ritesh Batra	Nominated	
Producers Guild Film Awards	16 January 2014	Best Screenplay	Ritesh Batra	Nominated	
Producers Guild Film Awards	16 January 2014	Best Actor in a Leading Role	Irrfan Khan	Nominated	
Producers Guild Film Awards	16 January 2014	Performer of the Year	Irrfan Khan	Won	
Producers Guild Film Awards	16 January 2014	Best Actress in a Leading Role	Nimrat Kaur	Nominated	
Producers Guild Film Awards	16 January 2014	Best Female Debut	Nimrat Kaur	Nominated	
Producers Guild Film Awards	16 January 2014	Best Actor in a Supporting Role	Nawazuddin Siddiqui	Won	
Reykjavík International Film Festival	26 September – 6 October 2013	Church of Iceland Award	Ritesh Batra	Won	
Screen Awards	14 January 2014	Best Film	Anurag Kashyap, Arun Rangachari, Guneet Monga	Nominated	
Screen Awards	14 January 2014	Most Promising Debut Director	Ritesh Batra	Won	
Screen Awards	14 January 2014	Best Story	Ritesh Batra	Nominated	
Screen Awards	14 January 2014	Best Screenplay	Ritesh Batra	Nominated	
Screen Awards	14 January 2014	Best Actor	Irrfan Khan	Nominated	
Screen Awards	14 January 2014	Best Actress	Nimrat Kaur	Nominated	
Screen Awards	14 January 2014	Best Supporting Actor	Nawazuddin Siddiqui	Nominated	
Zee Cine Awards	8 February 2014	Best Debut Director	Ritesh Batra	Won	
Zee Cine Awards	8 February 2014	Best Story	Ritesh Batra	Nominated	
Zee Cine Awards	8 February 2014	Best Actor in a Supporting Role – Male	Nawazuddin Siddiqui	Nominated	

== See also ==
- Bollywood films of 2013
- Parallel Cinema
