= Mickey Virus =

2013 Indian Hindi film by Saurabh Varma

- Directed by: Saurabh Varma
- Screenplay by: Saurabh Varma; Aaryaan Saxena
- Story by: Saurabh Varma; Elvin Raja
- Produced by: Arun Rangachari; Vivek Rangachari; Shahnaab Alam; Murad Khetani
- Starring: Manish Paul; Elli AvrRam; Manish Choudhary; Varun Badola; Puja Gupta; Nitesh Pandey
- Cinematography: Anshuman Mahaley
- Edited by: Archit D Rastogi, Finn George Modathara
- Production company: DAR Motion Pictures
- Release date: 25 October 2013
- Running time: 135 minutes
- Country: India
- Language: Hindi
- Budget: ₹110 million (US$1.1 million)

Mickey Virus is a 2013 Indian Hindi-language Comedy thriller film, written and directed by Saurabh Varma. It was produced by DAR Motion Pictures in association with Trilogic Digital Media Limited and Awesome Films Pvt. Ltd. The film stars Manish Paul, Elli AvrRam, Manish Choudhary, Puja Gupta, and Varun Badola in the lead roles. The film, despite receiving positive reviews, was a flop at the box-office.

== Plot ==
When two hackers are murdered in Delhi, the Delhi Police suspect that the case revolves around hacking. They begin their search to find a computer hacker who can help them crack this case. The head of the police team, ACP Siddhanth, accompanied by Inspector Bhalla, stumbles across Mickey Arora, a lazy but smart hacker who runs a grocery store during the day and creates viruses for anti-virus companies at night, along with his friends, the tomboy Shalu "Chutney" Sharma, Manjot "Floppy" Gill, Palwinder "Pancho" Singh, and Professor, who assist him in all odd jobs.

ACP Siddhanth hires him to hack the website of a group of cybercriminals known as the Bhram Gang. Meanwhile, Mickey falls in love with Kamayani, an employee of Excalibur Securities. One day in her office, Kamayani mistakenly gets transferred a large amount of money from a client's account, but, to avoid her being fired, Mickey hacks the company's website to reverse the transaction. The next morning, Micky realises that he has unwittingly stolen ₹1 billion from a Dubai-based don named Anwar Raja, and Kamayani has been murdered. Scared of being framed for both crimes, Mickey seeks help from his friends.

In his quest to search for the real culprit, Mickey traces the ₹1 billion and finds out that ACP Siddhanth is the mastermind who forced Kamayani to bluff him. Mickey calls ACP and his friends to the parking lot of Nehru Place, where ACP tells him that his friends Floppy, Pancho, and Professor are the Bhram Gang admins and want to kill him for the money, as they did to the two hackers and Kamayani. Surrounded by the goons, Mickey records and telecasts their confession on YouTube. In the end, Inspector Bhalla, along with the police force, arrests ACP Siddhanth and the Bhram Gang. Mickey secretly takes one crore from the stolen ₹1 billion before handing it over to Inspector Bhalla. Credits roll to show a few deleted scenes and bloopers and plays a call recording of Anwar Raja, who orders to kill Mickey.

== Cast ==
- Manish Paul as Mickey Arora aka Mickey Virus
- Elli AvrRam as Kamayani aka Kate George
- Manish Choudhary as ACP Siddhanth Chauhan
- Varun Badola as Inspector Devender Bhalla
- Puja Gupta as Shalu Sharma aka Chutney
- Nitesh Pandey as Professor
- Raghav Kakkar as Manjot Gill aka Floppy
- Vikesh Kumar as Palwinder Singh aka Pancho

== Crew ==
- Written and Directed by: Saurabh Varma
- Screenplay: Saurabh Varma
- Script Consultant: Kuldeep Ruhil
- Producers: Arun Rangachari and Vivek Rangachari
- Co-Producers: Kamlesh Gori, Murad Khetani, Vishal Gurnani, Nailesh Mehta, Dharmesh Shah and Raj Deshpande
- Associate Producers: Pradeep Nimani and Murli Chhatwani
- Title Song: Faizan – Agnel
- Director of Photography: Anshuman Mahalay
- Executive Producer: Meraj Shaikh
- Creative Producer: Nikhil Bhat
- Editor: Archit D. Rastogi
- Audiography: Subash Sahoo
- Assistant Director: Raghav Gupta

== Production ==
The film was shot in New Delhi, including in office complex of Nehru Place. Several Bollywood biggies like Salman Khan, Madhuri Dixit, Ranbir Kapoor, Anil Kapoor and Karan Johar were featured in a promotional video of Mickey Virus. The movie has come under the scanner of Governmental Agencies as it displays techniques of high-profile robbery which might spur reel to real life robbery incidents. Elli Avram is also one of the contestants of Bigg Boss 7. She would be inside the House of Bigg Boss, cut off from the outside world at the time of Movie Release, making it a first of its kind Bollywood Debut. Mickey Virus is made on a budget of Rs. 110 million, which includes publicity and advertising, and it was released in 1,200 screens in India. Chances are that the film will be remade in Tamil and Telugu.

== Soundtrack ==
Mickey Virus

Soundtrack album by Hanif Shaikh and Faizan Hussain – Agnel Roman
- Released: 3 October 2013
- Genre: Soundtrack
- Length: 24:30
- Labels: T-Series; DAR Motion Pictures

Hanif Shaikh chronology
Paathshaala (2010)	Mickey Virus (2013)

Faizan Hussain – Agnel Roman chronology
Ragini MMS (2011)	Mickey Virus (2013)

The soundtrack was released on 3 October 2013 on the digital music platform iTunes. The album consists of six tracks, and the only one of them by Faizan Hussain & Agnel Roman, Manoj Yadav and Arun Kumar writing the lyrics.

Track listing
No.	Title	Lyrics	Music	Singer(s)	Length
1.	"Pyaar China Ka Maal Hai"	Hanif Shaikh	Hanif Shaikh	Manish Paul	3:14
2.	"Tose Naina"	Hanif Shaikh	Hanif Shaikh	Arijit Singh	4:24
3.	"Sajna Ve Sajna Ve"	Manoj Yadav	Hanif Shaikh	Altamash Faridi, Shadab Faridi	3:59
4.	"Aankhon Hi Aankhon Ne (Duet)"	Hanif Shaikh	Hanif Shaikh	Mohit Chauhan, Palak Muchhal	4:40
5.	"Mickey Virus"	Arun Kumar	Faizan Hussain - Agnel Roman	Nikhil Paul George, Siddhant Sharma, Agnel Roman	3:50
6.	"Aankhon Hi Aankhon Ne (Female)"	Hanif Shaikh	Hanif Shaikh	Palak Muchhal	4:23
Total length:					24:30

== Marketing ==
Mickey Virus was promoted by Manish Paul in Bigg Boss on Colors. A promotional clip of Mickey Virus featured Salman Khan, Ranbir Kapoor, Anil Kapoor, Madhuri Dixit Nene, Farah Khan, Karan Johar, Remo D'souza, Kapil Sharma, either dishing out funny one-liners or abusing Mickey. Lauren Gottlieb, Drashti Dhami, Jeetendra and Manish's TV friends Vahbbiz Dorabjee, Vivian Dsena attended the special screening of Mickey Virus.

== Critical reception ==
Mickey Virus received positive to mixed reviews. Taran Adarsh of Bollywood Hungama gave it 3 out of 5 stars, finding the thriller to be engaging for younger viewers. Madhureeta Mukherjee of Times of India gave it 3 out of 5 stars. Mohar Basu of Koimoi gave it 2.5 out of 5 stars. Rajeev Masand of CNN-IBN gave it 2 out of 5 stars, criticizing the length and engagement. Faheem Ruhani of India Today gave it 3 out of 5 stars. Saibal Chatterjee of NDTV gave it 2.5 out of 5 stars. Tushar Joshi of DNA gave it 2.5 stars. Shubhra Gupta of Indian Express gave it 2 stars. Sanjukta sharma of Livemint did not give a rating, but found the film to have a weak plot and premise. Anupama Chopra gave it 2 stars. Zee News gave it 3.5 stars. Nikhil Arora of DesiMartini gave it 2 stars.

== Box office ==
Mickey Virus got a 15–20% opening and collected around ₹16.5 million (US$170,000) nett on first day. It collected ₹71.5 million (US$740,000) nett in its first week and it was declared flop in box office India.
