= Shlok Sharma =

Indian film director

- Born: 1985 (age 40–41)
- Occupations: Director, screenwriter, producer
- Years active: 2005–present

Shlok Sharma is an Indian director, screenwriter and producer known for his works in Hindi cinema. His notable works include the 2013 anthology film Shorts, the 2017 feature film Haraamkhor and the 2018 feature film Zoo.

== Early career ==
Shlok's father was a Yoga teacher to director Vishal Bhardwaj and lyricist Gulzar. After completing his higher secondary education, Shlok decided not to pursue education further and build a career in film-making. His father recommended him to Bhardwaj who hired him as a production assistant on his 2005 film, The Blue Umbrella. He then went on to work with Bhardwaj on his next film, Omkara. Shlok met Anurag Kashyap on the sets of the film who hired him as an Assistant Director for his 2007 film, No Smoking. He worked with Kashyap on his next feature film Dev.D before joining as a Second Unit Director on Gangs of Wasseypur. During the shooting of the film, he went to jail for shooting on railway tracks without permission.

In 2010, Shlok Sharma released his first short film Tubelight Ka Chaand which won the Best Short Film award at the 2011 Indian Film Festival Stuttgart. He made his second short film, Bombay Mirror in 2010 which featured Rajkummar Rao and Vijay Maurya but the film wasn't released till 2014.

== Feature films and other projects ==
Shlok made his feature film debut with the anthology film Shorts that was released in 2013. The film consisted of five short films out of which one, Sujata, was directed by him and consisted of a story of a young girl, who is struggling to come out of the clutches of her tormenting cousin brother. His second feature film, Haraamkhor was shot in 2013 and explores the romance between a 14-year-old school student and her teacher. The film premiered at the 15th New York Indian Film Festival and won the Silver Gateway of India trophy at the 17th MAMI Mumbai Film Festival but was denied a certificate by the Central Board of Film Certification. The film was subsequently approved by the Film Certification Appellate Tribunal and was released in 2017 to critical acclaim.

During this time, he also created two more short films, R.I.P (Romance In Peace) for the storytelling platform Terribly Tiny Tales and Beautiful World for the news publication The Quint that featured his long time collaborator Shweta Tripathi who has acted in all his feature films. To gain complete artistic control over his next film, Zoo, Shlok Sharma decided to shoot it with an IPhone 6S Plus and produced the film himself. The film had its international premiere at the 2017 Busan International Film Festival and India premiere at the 2017 MAMI Mumbai Film Festival. The film was picked up by Netflix for online distribution. In 2019, Shlok co-produced the sci fi film Cargo. In 2022, Shlok's third featured film, Two Sisters and a Husband had World Premiere in Feature International Narrative Competition section at Tribeca Film Festival in New York.

== Filmography ==
=== Films ===
Year	Title	Director	Producer	Writer	Assistant/Second unit Director	Notes
2005	The Blue Umbrella					Production assistant
2006	Omkara				Yes	
2007	No Smoking				Yes	
2008	One Two Three				Yes	
2009	Dev.D				Yes	
2011	Tubelight Ka Chand	Yes		Yes		Short film
2012	Gangs of Wasseypur				Yes	
2013	Shorts	Yes				
2014	Bombay Mirror	Yes		Yes		Short film
2015	R.I.P. (Romance In Peace)	Yes		Yes		Short film
2017	Haraamkhor	Yes		Yes		
2018	Beautiful World	Yes		Yes		Short film
2018	Zoo	Yes	Yes	Yes		
2019	Cargo		Yes			
2022	Two Sisters and a Husband	Yes	Yes	Yes		
