= Trishna (2011 film) =

- Official release poster of Trishna
- Directed by: Michael Winterbottom
- Written by: Michael Winterbottom
- Based on: Tess of the d'Urbervilles by Thomas Hardy
- Produced by: Michael Winterbottom; Melissa Parmenter; Sunil Bohra
- Starring: Freida Pinto; Riz Ahmed
- Cinematography: Marcel Zyskind
- Edited by: Mags Arnold
- Music by: Amit Trivedi; Shigeru Umebayashi
- Production companies: Head Gear Films; UK Film Council; Bankside Films; Revolution Films; Metrol Technology; VTR Film Investments; Bob Film Sweden; Film i Väst; Swedish Film Institute; Anurag Kashyap Films
- Distributed by: Artificial Eye (UK)
- Release dates: 9 September 2011 (TIFF); 9 March 2012 (UK)
- Running time: 109 minutes
- Countries: United Kingdom; Sweden; India
- Language: English

Trishna is a 2011 drama film, written and directed by Michael Winterbottom, and starring Freida Pinto and Riz Ahmed. A British-Swedish-Indian co-production, it is an adaptation of Thomas Hardy's 1891 novel Tess of the d'Urbervilles. It is Winterbottom's third Hardy adaptation, after Jude and The Claim. The film premiered at the Toronto International Film Festival on 9 September 2011, and after some further festival appearances it saw its first cinema release in the United Kingdom and Ireland on 9 March 2012.

== Plot ==
Wealthy British businessman Jay Singh comes to Rajasthan, India, to work in his father's hotel business. He sees a woman named Trishna dancing at a hotel and becomes attracted to her.

After an accident destroys her father's Jeep and leaves her family without the means to support themselves, Trishna, approached with an offer of employment from Jay, accepts and begins to work for him.

Jay gives Trishna special treatment and gifts. Overwhelmed by his generosity and his position of power, she does not know how to respond. After a night out with friends, Jay tracks her down and rescues her from two men harassing her on the street. Instead of taking her back to the servant quarters of the hotel, he stops in a wooded area and makes an advance. It is implied that he rapes her, and Trishna returns home crying. She flees the next morning back to her family. An unwanted pregnancy results, and Trishna has an abortion, hoping to continue in her family as if she had never left. However, her father's shame over her pregnancy and the family's need for income means that she is sent to serve her bed-bound aunt and work in the small factory her uncle runs. Jay tracks her down again and seems surprised that she has not tried to contact him, having viewed the rape as a consensual sexual experience. He offers her the opportunity to be his girlfriend in Mumbai, and Trishna chooses to go with him, escaping the drudgery of factory work.

In Mumbai, Trishna accompanies Jay to events relating to the film industry, in which he is interested in investing as a producer. She begins dance classes, and is good, but Jay refuses to allow her to pursue dancing as a career. He manipulates Trishna into believing that she does not want to be a dancer and to stay at his side. At their home, he is domineering and treats her subserviently, making her handle all domestic chores. One day, Jay has to leave for England, where his father is in hospital after having a stroke. Shocked by the brush with mortality, Jay feels closer to Trishna and confesses to having slept with two other women before she moved in with him. Feeling a level of trust with Jay, Trishna tells him about her pregnancy and abortion. Jay gets progressively angry about her keeping that secret from him. He abandons Trishna and stops paying the lease on their apartment. Trishna eventually moves in with some friends from dance class. Jay later returns to meet her, pretending it was all a misunderstanding and blaming her for not telling him about the unpaid lease. Meanwhile, a dance coordinator informs Trishna that, to begin a career as a dancer, she would need 30,000 rupees on a special card. The coordinator offers to loan her. Stuck between going into debt with a stranger or Jay, she chooses to return to Jay. His father's state means he has to return to the hotel in Rajasthan. He offers her a job there and promises to maintain their relationship in secret.

Jay treats her as a servant in public, which for him adds some titillating thrill to their sexual encounters. Jay's desire for control becomes ever more overt. He starts imagining himself as the raja of that hotel that was once a castle, taking up residence in the rooms the ruler had once occupied. After months of abuse, a distraught Trishna takes a kitchen knife while Jay is sleeping and stabs him to death.

She escapes and returns to her family's village, where her mother and younger siblings receive her happily. However, her father continues to treat her coldly. Despite appearing to have a normal life, Trishna eventually commits suicide by stabbing herself with the same knife used to kill Jay.

== Main cast ==
- Freida Pinto as Trishna
- Riz Ahmed as Jay
- Anurag Kashyap as himself
- Roshan Seth as Jay's father
- Amit Trivedi as himself
- Kalki Koechlin as herself
- Neet Mohan as Sandeep
- Harish Khanna as Vijay
- Aakash Dahiya as Avit
- Meeta Vashisht as Trishna's mother
- Huma Qureshi in a Special appearance in song "Maintenance"
- Vicky Kaushal in a Special appearance in the song "Maintenance"

== Production ==
The film was produced by Winterbottom's production company Revolution Films in co-production with Film i Väst and Bob Film Sweden, and in association with Anurag Kashyap Films. It received financial support from the UK Film Council and the Swedish Film Institute. Filming took place in Jaipur, Rajasthan.

== Soundtrack ==
=== Track listing ===
No.	Title	Lyrics	Singer(s)	Length
1.	"Raunakein"	Shelle	Kavita Seth, Krishan Kumar/Bhanwari Devi
2.	"Lagan Lagi"	Shelle	Shreya Ghoshal, Kavita Seth
3.	"Khari Khari"	Shelle	Kavita Seth
4.	"Maintenance"	Shelle	Richa Sharma, Manish J. Tipu
5.	"Khari Khari"	Shelle	Krishan Kumar/Bhanwari Devi
6.	"Ghoomer"		Safi Mohammad Langa
7.	"Kesariya Balam"		Safi Mohammad Langa
8.	"Gorbandh"		Safi Mohammad Langa
9.	"Govardhan"		Mehboob Langa & Party
10.	"Nimbura"		Mehboob Langa & Party
11.	"Chirmi"		Mehboob Langa & Party
12.	"Panihaari"		Mehboob Langa & Party

== Reception ==
Trishna received mixed reviews. David Gritten in the Daily Telegraph wrote that, "The film looks splendid, and its incisive score by Shigeru Umebayashi, with a lovely mournful waltz theme, propels the story all the way to its unhappy climax. Yet Trishna feels faintly unsatisfying, leaving a sense of opportunities missed and details not quite thought through." Film critic Roger Ebert wrote "Winterbottom is a director who never repeats himself, films all over the world, and in "Trishna," effortlessly embeds his story in modern India". Joe Morgenstern of The Wall Street Journal thought that the film was "spectacular visually, though awfully somber dramatically". As of June 2020, the film holds a 63% approval rating on the review aggregator Rotten Tomatoes, based on 92 reviews with an average rating of 6.07/10. For the academic reception of Trishna, see Mendes (2016).

The film was nominated for Best Film at the London Film Festival, for Tokyo Grand Prix at the Tokyo International Film Festival, and for Politiken's Audience Award at CPH:PIX in Copenhagen.
