= Ritesh Batra =

Indian filmmaker

- Born: 12 June 1979 (age 47); Mumbai, Maharashtra, India
- Education: Tisch School of Arts
- Occupations: Film director Screenwriter
- Years active: 2008–present

Ritesh Batra (born 12 June 1979) is an Indian film director and screenwriter. Batra's Hindi-language debut feature film The Lunchbox premiered at the 2013 Cannes Film Festival and won the Rail d'Or (Grand Golden Rail). Batra also won the Toronto Film Critics Association Award for Best First Feature Film in 2014. The Lunchbox was the highest-grossing foreign film in North America, Europe and Australia for 2014 grossing over US$25 Million. The film was also nominated for a BAFTA Award for Best Film Not in the English Language in 2015.

He then directed the English-language film The Sense of an Ending (2017), an adaptation of Julian Barnes' Booker Prize-winning novel. 2017 also saw the release of Batra's Our Souls at Night on Netflix. Batra's latest film is Photograph, released in 2019.

== Early life and background ==
Ritesh grew up in a middle-class family in Mumbai, India. His father Joginder Batra, worked in the Merchant Navy of India and his mother Manju Kapoor Batra, is a house wife. His elder sister Radhika Batra Shah runs a tea business. Ritesh completed his high school from AVM High School in Mumbai and later went to the United States to complete his higher studies. Ritesh worked as a consultant at Deloitte after graduating from Drake University, Iowa in Economics. But after three years of working he went back to school to chase his childhood dream of filmmaking. He attended New York University but dropped out of the film school.

== Career ==
Batra began his filmmaking career by writing and directing shorts. His Arab language short Café Regular, Cairo, screened at over 40 international film festivals and won over 12 awards including Critics Prize (FIPRESCI) Best Film at International Short Film Festival Oberhausen and Best Film at German Star of India. Batra was part of the Sundance Screenwriters and Directors lab with his project "Story of Ram" in 2009. He subsequently was made the Time Warner Story Telling Fellow at Sundance Film Festival and Annenberg Fellow at Sundance Film Academy. In 2011 Batra returned to India to make a documentary on the lunchbox delivery system in Mumbai. It was this venture of Batra's which conceptualized his first feature film The Lunchbox (2013). He developed this project through the TorinoFilmLab Framework programme in 2012.

The Lunchbox premiered at the Cannes Critics Week 2013 and won Rail d'Or (Grand Golden Rail). At Cannes the movie prompted a bidding war. Sony Pictures Classic acquired the North American rights to the film. The Lunchbox has been nominated for 33 Awards and won 25 so far. In 2014, Batra founded his own production company PoeticLicense Motion Pictures and is currently developing a slate of films.

== Filmography ==
Short film

- The Morning Ritual (2008)
- Gareeb Nawaz's Taxi (2010)
- Café Regular Cairo (2011)
- Masterchef (2013)

Feature film

- The Lunchbox (2013)
- The Sense of an Ending (2017)
- Our Souls at Night (2017)
- Photograph (2019)

== Awards ==
- Time Warner Storytelling Fellow – Sundance Film Festival
- Annenberg Fellow – Sundance Film Institute

The Lunchbox, 2013

- (Nominated) "Film not in the English Language" – BAFTA 2015
- Rail d’Or (Grand Golden Rail) – Cannes Film Festival
- Best First Feature – Toronto Film Critics Association Award
- Best Director Award – Odesa International Film Festival
- Church of Iceland Award – Reykjavik International Film Festival
- Best Screenplay – 7th Asia Pacific Screen Awards
- Best Screenplay – Asian Film Academy
- Best Screenplay – Asia Pacific Film Festival
- Jury Grand Prize – 7th Asia Pacific Screen Awards
- Best Screenplay – 7th Asia Pacific Screen Awards
- Muhr AsiaAfrica Special Mention – Dubai International Film Festival
- Best Film – Amazonas Film Festival, Brazil
- Canvas Audience Award – Ghent International Film Festival, Belgium
- Audience Award – World Cinema Amsterdam
- Best Director – International Festival Young Filmmakers of Saint-Jean-de-Luz
- Audience Award – Belfast Film Festival, UK
- Best Feature Film – Zagreb Golden Pram Award

Cafe Regular Cairo, 2011

- Critics Prize (FIPRESCI) Best Film – International Short Film Festival Oberhausen
- Jury Special Mention – Tribeca Film Festival
- Jury Special Mention – Chicago International Film Festival
- Best Short Film – The Warp
- Best Short Film – German Star of India
- Clipagem Trophy – Kinoforum – Brazil

Honours

- Chief guest at 8th Filmsaaz where he was given lifetime membership of the prestigious University Film Club, Aligarh Muslim University.
