= Peddlers (film) =

- Directed by: Vasan Bala
- Screenplay by: Vasan Bala
- Produced by: Anurag Kashyap; Guneet Monga; Shahnaab Alam
- Starring: Gulshan Devaiah; Nishikant Kamat; Kriti Malhotra; Siddharth Menon; Nimrat Kaur
- Cinematography: Siddharth Diwan
- Edited by: Prerna Saigal
- Music by: Karan Kulkarni
- Production companies: Sikhya Entertainment; Elle Driver; AKFPL
- Distributed by: Eros International
- Release date: May 2012 (Cannes)
- Running time: 116 min
- Country: India
- Language: Hindi

Peddlers is a 2012 Indian Hindi-language crime thriller film written and directed by Vasan Bala. The film stars Gulshan Devaiah, Nishikant Kamat, Kriti Malhotra, Nimrat Kaur and Siddharth Menon. The film was screened as part of Critics' Week of 2012 Cannes Film Festival.

Film's producer, Guneet Monga raised nearly ₹1 crore (US$100,000), half of film's budget of ₹2 crore (US$210,000) by posting the film's script on Facebook.

== Plot ==
The film is set in Mumbai, and revolves around 20-year-old destitute boys who get trapped in the drug trade and a young cop, who tracks them.

== Cast ==
- Gulshan Devaiah as Ranjit D'souza
- Nishikant Kamat
- Nimrat Kaur as Kuljeet
- Kriti Malhotra as Bilkis
- Siddharth Mennon as Mandar
- Mukesh Chhabra
- Zachary Coffin
- Murari Kumar as JJ
- Vijesh Rajan as Meth Cook

== Release ==
The film was screened as part of Critics' Week of 2012 Cannes Film Festival.

Eros International acquired the Indian distribution rights in May 2012. However the film was not released theatrically after that, In April 2020 Vasan Bala and producer Guneet Monga took to Twitter to request Eros to release film on their streaming platform Eros Now. In December 2020, Eros Now announced a slate of 33 films to be released on their platform in 2021, including Peddlers, but the film was not released in 2021.

== Reception ==
Deborah Young of The Hollywood Reporter wrote "Though it takes a long time coming together, the Hindi-language film does finally succeed in its action-packed last half-hour, rewarding audiences who hang on for that long." Jay Weissberg of Variety called Bala a "budding talent", he further wrote that Bala has written "compelling characters (though some take too long to reach that state), and his facility with dialogue outstrips many other indie subcontinentals."
