= Sushil Rajpal =

Indian director and producer

- Born: Bihar, India
- Other name: Sushil Rajpal
- Occupations: producer, Director, Cinematographer screenwriter
- Years active: 1991–present

Sushil Rajpal is an Indian director and producer. He was born and brought up in Bihar. He is alumnus of Film and Television Institute of India (FTII) and famous for directing his National Award winning film Antardwand.

== Early life ==
Sushil Rajpal was born and brought up in Gorakhpur [UP]. He studied at Vikas Vidyalaya, Ranchi and then at Hansraj College, Delhi. He joined the Film and Television Institute of India (FTII), Pune. He is director of National Award winner film Antardwand in which almost entire cast was from Bihar and he is also native of Bihar.

== Career ==
He started his Bollywood career with the film Diksha as an Assistant Cinematographer. Sushil Rajpal, whose directorial debut, true to life film Antardwand, received 95% of the good reviews and accolades from the industry, including a National Award. Antardwand (Hindi: अंतरद्वंद्व; English translation: Inner conflict) is a 2010 Indian film co-written, produced and directed by Sushil Rajpal. The film stars Raj Singh Chaudhary and Swati Sen in the leading roles while Vinay Pathak and Akhilendra Mishra play supporting roles. Made on a budget of ₹15 million (US$160,000), the film is based on the practice of groom kidnapping that is seen in Bihar of India. The film won the National Film Award for Best Film on Social Issues at the 2009 National Awards. It had its commercial release on 27 August 2010

== Filmography ==
Year	Film	Role(s)
2021	Shaadisthan	Cinematographer
2012	Old Monk	director
2011	Jackpot	Cinematographer
2010	Antardwand	Director, Story
2007	Laaga Chunari Mein Daag	Cinematographer
1991	Diksha	Assistant Cinematographer
