= Raj Singh =

Raj Singh may refer to:

- Raj Singh I (1629–1680), Rana of Mewar the maternal uncle of Ajit Singh of Marwar
- Raj Singh II (1743–1761), son of Maharana Pratap Singh II
- Raj Singh (businessman) (born 1964), Sukhraj 'Raj' Singh, Indian businessman
- Jinder Mahal (born 1986), Canadian professional wrestler whose previous ring name was Tiger Raj Singh
- Raj Singh, Indian professional wrestler signed to TNA Wrestling
- Raj Kumar Singh Gautam (born 1966), Indian politician and businessman, founder and CMD of Gautam Group
- Raj Kishor Singh, Indian politician from Uttar Pradesh
- Raj Singh Dungarpur (1935–2009), former President of BCCI
- Raj Singh Arora (born 1984), Indian actor and photographer
- Annu Raj Singh (born 1984), Indian shooter from Aligarh
- Raj Man Singh Chitrakar (1797–1865), Nepalese artist in the mid 19th century
- Raj Kunwar Singh (1897–1968), noted zamindar and the Raja of Barauli Rao
- Raj Singh Chaudhary, Indian actor from Darjeeling
- Yogeshwar Raj Singh (born 1967), scion of Kawardha Raj
- Giri Raj Singh Sirohi, first Indian to set foot on Antarctica

== See also ==
- Raj (disambiguation)
- Raj Kumar Singh (disambiguation)
- Rajasimha (disambiguation), alternative form of the name
- List of people with surname Singh
