= No Smoking (2007 film) =

Indian film by Anurag Kashyap

- Theatrical release poster
- Directed by: Anurag Kashyap
- Written by: Anurag Kashyap
- Story by: Anurag Kashyap; Raj Singh Chaudhary
- Based on: Quitters, Inc. (1978) by Stephen King
- Produced by: Kumar Mangat Pathak; Vishal Bhardwaj
- Starring: John Abraham; Ayesha Takia; Paresh Rawal; Ranvir Shorey
- Cinematography: Rajeev Ravi
- Edited by: Aarti Bajaj
- Music by: Songs: Vishal Bhardwaj; Score: Hitesh Sonik; Clinton Cerejo
- Production companies: Big Screen Entertainment; Vishal Bhardwaj Films
- Distributed by: Eros International
- Release dates: 24 October 2007 (Rome Film Festival); 26 October 2007 (India)
- Running time: 127 minutes
- Country: India
- Language: Hindi
- Budget: ₹7.50 crore
- Box office: ₹3.49 crore

No Smoking is a 2007 Indian Hindi-language black comedy thriller film written and directed by Anurag Kashyap, and produced by Vishal Bhardwaj. The film stars John Abraham, Ayesha Takia, Paresh Rawal and Ranvir Shorey. The first Stephen King Hindi film adaptation, it follows K (Abraham), a wealthy, proud, chain smoking businessman, who agrees to quit smoking to save his marriage, and visits a rehabilitation centre to assuage his wife (Takia) and childhood friend (Shorey), only to be caught up in a labyrinthine plot by Baba Bangali (Rawal), the all-knowing man running the centre, who guarantees that he will make him quit.

Combining story ideas from Ram Gopal Varma, Raj Singh Chaudhary and "Quitters, Inc.", Kashyap pitched the film to Abraham, who wanted to work with him, and Bhardwaj, who wanted to produce for him, both of whom accepted. Principal photography took place in Dharavi, Kutch, Bandra, Dongri, Mumbai, Uzbekistan, Kazakhstan and Russia. Bhardwaj also composed the music, while the lyrics were written by Gulzar. The film's themes include freedom, privacy, surveillance and censorship.

No Smoking premiered at the Rome Film Festival on 24 October 2007, before its general release on 26 October. The film received negative reviews and bombed at the box-office, grossing ₹3.49 crore (equivalent to ₹11 crore or US$1.2 million in 2026) against a budget of ₹7.50 crore (equivalent to ₹25 crore or US$2.6 million in 2026). However, at the 53rd Filmfare Awards, it received two nominations, and has since gained a cult following. Abraham has repeatedly expressed interest in a sequel.

== Plot ==
K, a confident, narcissistic and arrogant businessman in his 30s, is addicted to smoking. K's friends, Abbas and the doctor, offer to set up an appointment at a rehabilitation centre called Prayogshaala (lit. 'Laboratory'), but K ignores their advice. His addiction strains his relationship with his wife Anjali. After K cannot make love to her without having to stop to light up a cigarette, she leaves him.

Wanting to save his marriage, K decides to check out Prayogshaala, and meets Shri Shri Prakash Guru Ghantal Baba Bangali Sealdah Wale there, the man running the rehabilitation centre. The method Prayogshaala uses to cure their patients is based on fear and psychological manipulation. Each time a patient gives in to their vice, Baba makes sure that they will be punished severely, which includes:

1. Almost killing one of his loved ones, by keeping them in a chamber full of all the cigarette smoke he has smoked in his entire life for five minutes, 2. Cutting off his finger, 3. Killing one of his loved ones, 4. Taking his soul.

K is forced to pay for his treatment by Baba and his disciples. Baba then tells K that he is free to leave, but he must abide by the rules or he will suffer the consequences. K tries to keep to the terms but fails twice, and is punished. He is now conscious about the third time.

After some time, K meets an old friend, Alex, who is now a Cuban cigar seller. At an event, K is forced to place a cigar in his mouth to appease Alex. Seconds later, he receives a phone call from the police, informing him that his wife is missing. He calls Baba, and is told that for smoking, his wife will be killed. He protests that he did not actually light the cigarette. Baba apologizes for the mistake, but says that it is too late. K asks Baba to tell the police about this, but the line is cut, and the phone number is non-existent upon re-dialing. K's protests are ignored and the police believe that he is delusional. Trying to make them believe, he seeks out Abbas, who had lost a finger, only to find that he has all of his fingers intact, with Abbas claiming to have no knowledge of Prayogshaala or Baba Bangali. Mocking him, the police forces K to smoke. Shortly afterwards, K gets a phone call about his brother committing suicide due to his chain-smoking. K raves angrily at the police and is thrown in jail, but is eventually bailed out.

K learns that Baba permits smoking during a period known as 'Zero Minute'. He attends such an event, where he lights up a cigarette. Suddenly, K wakes up in a remote Russian army base with a call from his wife, and she asks him why he believes she is dead. Confused, K escapes from the base by jumping into a lone bathtub in the snow . He ends up in a ragged room, from which he sees himself staring out from a hospital room. He also sees his wife and Baba. He calls out but no one can hear him, and he is told that it is because his body no longer hears his inner soul. The final punishment is complete.

K wakes up in his home, with Anjali sleeping beside him. When he goes to the bathroom, he finds out that he is missing two fingers. In a mid-credits scene, K, who has since gotten his finger back, is seen recommending Prayogshaala to a friend.

== Cast ==
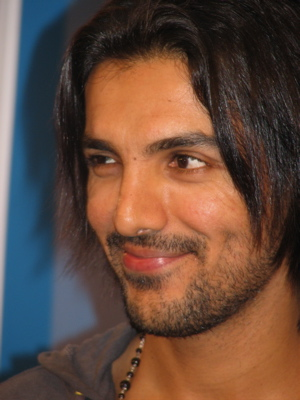
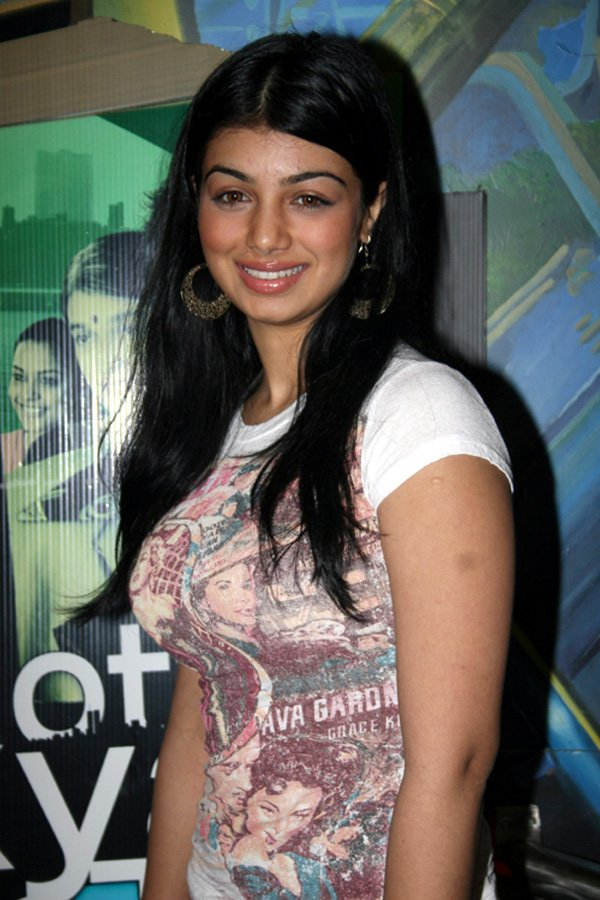
John Abaraham (left, pictured in 2007) and Ayesha Takia (right, pictured in 2006)
- John Abraham as K: A wealthy, proud, chain-smoking businessman
- Ayesha Takia as
  - Anjali: K's wife, who is fed up of his smoking
  - Annie: K's secretary
- Paresh Rawal as Shri Shri Prakash Guru Ghantal Baba Bangali Sealdah Wale: An all-knowing, suspicious, rugged-looking specialist running a rehabilitation centre
- Ranvir Shorey as Abbas Tyrewala: K's friend since childhood
- Joy Fernandes as Alex: A friend of K
- Kiku Sharda as the doctor: A friend of K
- Jesse Randhawa as the dancer in the song "Jab Bhi"
- Gajraj Rao as R. K. Dhindra
- Rasika Duggal as Suzi
- Priyanka Bose as Sarah
- Shlok Sharma as an office employee
- Vikram Aditya Motwane as the employee who resigns
- Bipasha Basu as the dancer in the song "Phoonk De"
- Vasan Bala as a man at Alex's cigar launch party (uncredited)
- Anurag Kashyap as the man in the elevator (uncredited)

== Production ==
=== Development ===
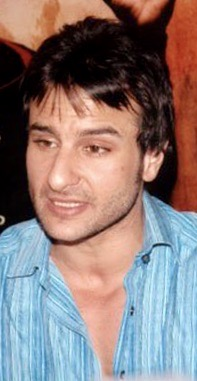
Saif Ali Khan (pictured in 2006) was erroneously reported to be in the film.

During the making of Satya (1998), its director Ram Gopal Varma pitched a story to its writer Anurag Kashyap, about a chain smoker's encounter with someone who despises smoking. It inspired Kashyap to come up with an idea, which he shared with Varma, who in his turn laughed and dismissed it. Varma later incorporated his own idea of the story as a short segment, No Smoking starring Saif Ali Khan, in his anthology film, Darna Mana Hai (2003). Titling it Cigarette Smoking is Injurious to Health, Kashyap shared his idea with Boney Kapoor, which prompted him to remark "go back to the planet you came from!" Kay Kay Menon, the lead in Kashyap's unreleased Paanch (2003), liked the idea, but found it incomplete. During the shooting of Kashyap's Black Friday (2007), his assistant, Raj Singh Chaudhary, narrated him a different idea for a short film, in which he wanted Kashyap to act, about a chain smoker who wakes up without cigarettes and is unable to get any, because of a curfew. Kashyap agreed on the condition that Chaudhary allow him to combine both of their ideas. Kashyap's producer friends and acquaintances advised him to have a major actor back the idea. After he narrated it to Angad Paul, he suggested Shah Rukh Khan, but Kashyap wanted Menon, as he was interested in it. When Black Friday too couldn't find a release, and no one was ready to back his Gulaal, Kashyap started drinking heavily, and sank into depression. That's when Nivedita Bhattacharya, Menon's wife, told him to make the film by any means necessary, even if it means without Menon's involvement. Kashyap paid a visit to Khan, his college mate, who liked the idea, calling it "fantastic but dark," but advised Kashyap to stay from experimentation until later. Taking inspiration from Stephen King's "Quitters, Inc." (1978), Kashyap decided to take the story forward. As of October 2025, it remains the only King Hindi film adaptation. The film had a personal significance for him as after his first two directorial efforts Paanch and Black Friday went unreleased, people were telling him to "quit." He has stated that people advised him not to make the movie at all. When asked if Cat's Eye (1985), an American anthology horror film that adapted "Quitters, Inc." as one of its segments, was an inspiration, he replied that he hadn't watched it until after the script was complete. Remarking that the film has a universal subject, Kashyap further stated that he had to do a mainstream film. "People were getting wary of me, so it was time. And I needed a box-office hit." The film paid homage to Bob Fosse, a "chain-smoking director-choreographer who went to an early grave," by naming a nighclub after him.

In "Quitters, Inc.", after the chain-smoking protagonist Dick Morrison bumps into an old friend, their conversation leads Morrison to the titular facility in Manhattan. The story also features endless scrutiny, death threats and even a gas chamber. Both K and Morrison finds a patsy for the rehab at the end.

Kashyap began to approach actors through short messaging service; John Abraham replied back, because Deepa Mehta, the director of his Oscar-nominated Water (2005), for which Kashyap penned the dialogues, told him that he must work with Kashyap. Thinking that Abraham would not be able to understand the idea, and afraid of throwing away the chance, he narrated him an idea which he came up on his way to Abraham's residence in a rickshaw, titled Lapata (lit. 'Lost'), about a "bad actor", since Kashyap was told that Abraham wasn't a good actor. Abraham told him that he expected something more intelligent from Kashyap, seeing that people already regard him as a bad actor. Kashyap then told him about No Smoking, which the actor ended up loving. Lapata later formed the basis for Kashyap's Ugly (2013). Kashyap claimed that Abraham was trying to rediscover himself; that is what propelled him to accept the film, alongside Kabul Express (2006), Taxi No. 9211 (2006), Goal (2007), Aashayein (2010) and Water. Abraham provided Kashyap financial assistance and told him to finalise the script, which he did when he flew to the US. Since, the film didn't had a producer, Abraham reached out to UTV, but they passed on the project, terming it "too weird." After directing Omkara (2006), Vishal Bhardwaj approached Kashyap when he came back to India, wanting to make a film with him. Kashyap told him about No Smoking, and Bhardwaj agreed to work with him. Bhardwaj ended up collaborating with Kumar Mangat Pathak as producer of the film, who came on board after hearing a narration, with Big Screen Entertainment and Vishal Bhardwaj Films as production companies. Mangat Pathak put forward Ali Khan for the lead, who worked with him in Omkara, but Kashyap declined the suggestion.

=== Pre-production ===
For the dual role of Anjali and Annie, "one a self-respecting woman, another opposite", Kashyap went to actresses he thought could do the role, but they refused as the role was not substantial enough. Ultimately, Ayesha Takia was cast. She was not comfortable with the love scenes and the outfits of her character Annie, though Kashyap refused to make any changes. Despite this, he maintained that she was an "actress" and a "face" too.

Originally, Rajkumar Santoshi was to play the doctor, and Abbas Tyrewala was to play Abbas, that is why Kashyap named the character after him. However, Tyrewala later opted out and the role was given to Ranvir Shorey instead. During a scene, a character says, "Salaam Namaste, MBBS," referencing Tyrewala's films. Furthermore, erroneous reports surfaced that Ali Khan would appear in a cameo, on the request of Mangat Pathak. It was also reported that Bipasha Basu would appear in an item number. When asked what made Kashyap appear in the film, he replied, "only vanity." Kashyap cast well-known actors in the hope of having the film released; he thought that casting "unknown but brilliant" actors had made his prior films unreleased.

Abhishek Pathak, Mangat Pathak's son, served as the first assistant director of the film, while the costumes were designed by Anna Singh. Ashley Lobo joined the film as the choreographer, Tariq Umar Khan was the art director, while Wasiq Khan came on as the production designer for the film.

=== Filming ===
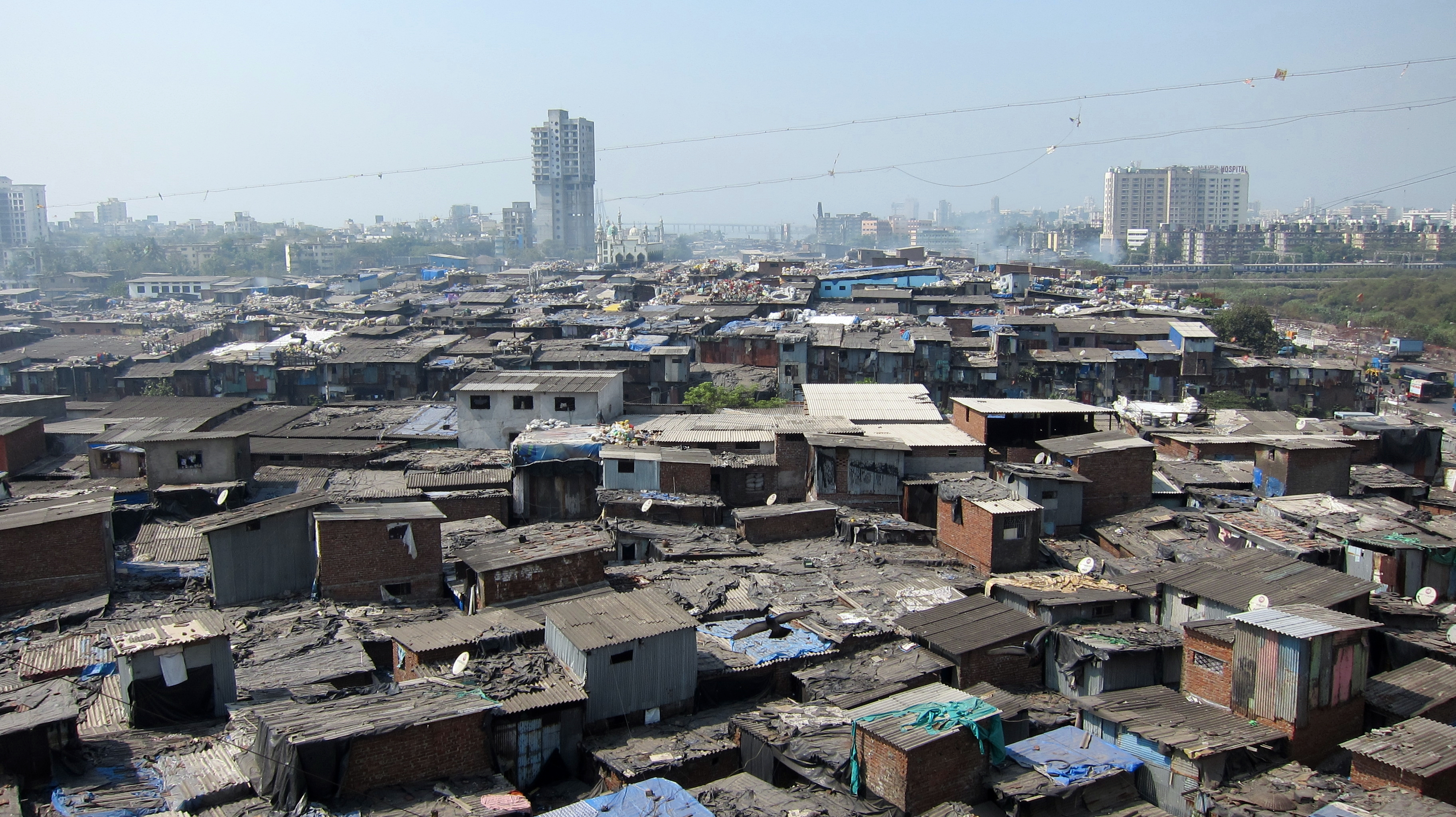
Principal photography took place in Dharavi (pictured in 2011), a slum in Mumbai, India.

With cinematography undertaken by Rajeev Ravi, principal photography took place in Dharavi, Kutch, Bandra, Dongri, Mumbai, Uzbekistan, Kazakhstan and Russia. K's apartment was a set made up on the terrace of a 44th floor apartment in Worli, South Mumbai. Brabourne Stadium could be seen in a scene early in the film. (Note: Attributed to multiple references) The film also made use of Film City studio. The film was shot keeping in mind to depict the anxiety of an addict. Ravi shot the film using dark colours, using only shades of brown, and muted tones of black. Kashyap gave Abraham freedom to improvise on set. For the film, Abraham had to run as much as 10 kilometers (33,000 ft) a day. During the shooting in Uzbekistan, a Russian actor dressed as a soldier had to chase Abraham. After running 200 meters (660 ft), the man collapsed from oxygen depletion and had to be rushed to a hospital, as the shooting was on a high altitude. Abraham had predicted beforehand that the actor would collapse. There was a rumor of Abraham appearing in a nude scene, but Kashyap clarified that he had not decided how to shoot it. In a later interview, Kashyap claimed that one might see the reflection of Abraham's butt. In a 2011 interview, Kashyap revealed that there were two sequences he would have shot differently if he had been given the liberty. He also admitted that the mid-credit scene should have played before the credits. Since none of his films were released up until that point, he claimed to have shot the movie in "a lot of anger," and that he was "defying the system" by making the film.

== Soundtrack ==
No Smoking

Studio album by Vishal Bhardwaj
- Released: 5 September 2007 (India)
- Genre: Feature film soundtrack
- Label: Eros Music
- Producers: Kumar Mangat Pathak, Vishal Bhardwaj

Vishal Bhardwaj chronology
Omkara (2006)	No Smoking (2007)	U, Me Aur Hum (2008)

The official soundtrack was composed by Vishal Bhardwaj, while the lyrics were written by Gulzar.

=== Track listing ===
All tracks are written by Gulzar.

No.	Title	Singer(s)	Length
1.	"Kash Laga"	Daler Mehndi, Sukhwinder Singh, Vishal Bhardwaj	5:47
2.	"Phoonk De"	Sukhwinder Singh	5:55
3.	"Ash Tray"	Deva Sengupta	4:39
4.	"Jab Bhi" (Trance)	Sunidhi Chauhan	5:06
5.	"Phoonk De" (Club Mix)	Rekha Bhardwaj	5:15
6.	"Jab Bhi" (Jazz)	Adnan Sami	5:03

Philip French noted how "all the songs are about smoking."

=== Reception ===
Finding the soundtrack to be unconventional, and exciting in a couple of places, Joginder Tuteja praised the renditions of Sami and Rekha Bhardwaj, but argued that "Kash Laga" is "fine if one strictly keeps in mind its situational appeal." "Phoonk De" (Club Mix) was publicized extensively, and became popular.

== Themes ==
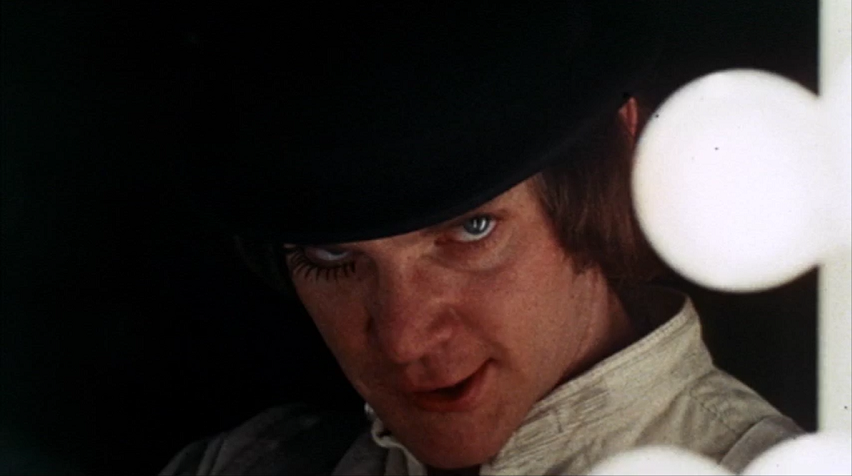
K's predicament was compared to Alex DeLarge, the protagonist in A Clockwork Orange (1971).

On the significance of fingers, Kashyap said that fingers could also be used to hold a pen, which symbolises writing, that is freedom of expression; and that K without his fingers represented his body without soul. Kashyap has said that chopping two fingers symbolises Paanch and Black Friday, his first two directorial efforts, that were refused release by the CBFC, India's statutory film certification body. Prejo interpreted the film to be the "director's depiction of this authoritarian regime where even cinema, as an artistic form of expression, is suppressed and restrained." Similarly, Gautaman Bhaskaran stated, "Kashyap must have realized that open confrontation with the authorities does not quite pay, so he plays around with words and actions." Saloni Gajjar interpreted the film as a "journey through hell and back, one in which Kashyap has to fight against a system that controls his output and tries to define what the general public should and shouldn’t consume," a system which, according to Amborish Roychoudhury, also included press—who had labelled Kashyap a jinxed director—and people who didn't want to work with him; "it was almost as if the world had conspired not to let him say what he wanted to say." However, Raja Sen doubted the claims that K stood for Kashyap, arguing instead that "K is a character with no redeeming qualities whatsoever," so that must not be the director's intention.

Zoeb Matin compared Baba Bangali's all too plausible "pompously philosophic" figure to despots who use false spiritualism as means for their "nefarious ends". Phelim O'Neill called him "Hitler-loving," Prejo called him a friend of Hitler's, and Anil Sinanan called him "a proud Hitler fan." Philip French pointed out that his means of coercion include constant surveillance and loss of privacy. Bhaskaran noted further that, "in using politico-religious methods, including curbing the freedom of his female employees by making them wear veils, the character reflects the state of autocracy and fanaticism, driven by money, politics and religion, which prevails in some sections of Indian society," and how the film is ultimately about manipulating the human being as K loathes the idea of giving up his right. In addition to burqa clad women, Roychoudhury also counted dwarfs and teeka-toting fanatics being used by Baba Bangali. Prejo posited that the film metaphorically depicts an authoritarian regime where the privilege of "free will and freedom of expression" may be granted only to "further the regime's cause." A 'system,' Roychoudhury pointed out, that can 'turn' others like K—for example, Abbas and the doctor.

Pavithra Selvam thought of smoking as a metaphor "to show how clouded the human mind can get. K's narcissistic behaviour in the film alludes to how self-centered our lives can get in the mad race we run everyday to reach the inscrutable. How we end up losing our souls and forget to keep in touch with ourselves by neglecting to do small humane acts that would make our lives worth living for. It also refers to the natural order of the world that good prevails where evil is quashed by the superior power." Prejo interpreted the film as a "journey through the complicated mind and psychology of a smoking addict who intends to kick the habit, a depiction of the travails of a chain smoker who finds it difficult to quit and the mental toll this process has on him." Gajjar wrote that "K represents people afflicted with serious addictions who struggle to escape their patterns." And when K does seek a change, "he descends into a hell of sorts where he was emotionally, mentally, and physically manipulated into giving up smoking, at the cost of his sanity."

Prejo pointed out "infinitely large repository of VHS tapes, which have recorded each and every incident and happenings in the lives of the patients of Prayogshala." Interpreting the film as a critique of surveillance state, Gajjar noted how, "Baba Bengali constantly has eyes on K, no matter how many flights he takes or remote places he goes to, even in the privacy of his own home," and that "viewed in the present day, there’s a degree of relatability to being observed at all times, and to being addicted to the very tools and services observing you."

Prejo noted the uncertainties of the events, whether they were real or in K's "convoluted psyche," pointing out K's repeated emergings from a bathtub, which could be his returning "to the real world" or "into his own mind." Gajjar interpreted K waking up in the solitary cabin as showing imprisonment of "K, or rather, his soul," and that his predicament "highlights his distorted state of mind after being psychologically tortured for so long."

Matin pointed out how K's journey takes him from his "plush South Bombay apartment overlooking the magnificent vista of Brabourne Stadium," into the "almost claustrophobic bustle of Dharavi's slums," and then further into a "subterranean purgatory in the hot bowels of the city where, as in a dream, time and place coalesce in a mist of sunlight and dirt."

Kashyap has stated that No Smoking is the story of "arrogance versus super arrogance, freedom to choose versus censorship; and that in the end freedom loses." Girish Shahane compared the film favorably to Stanley Kubrick's A Clockwork Orange and argued that both films show that "the cure is worse than the disease if it robs you of your soul."

Selvam saw Annie as manifestation of K's illusion of Anjali turning into his desirable secretary, and that "Annie refers to the desires that consume the human self."

== Release ==
No Smoking was invited to be screened at the 2nd Rome Film Festival, where the film had its well-received premiere on 24 October 2007, before its general release on 26 October. With Abraham emphasising the social message during promotions, the film was promoted as anti-smoking, so much so that the Health Ministry ended up liking the film. Kashyap later admitted to fool the censors into believing that the film was anti-smoking in order to release the film without any hurdles.

=== Reception ===
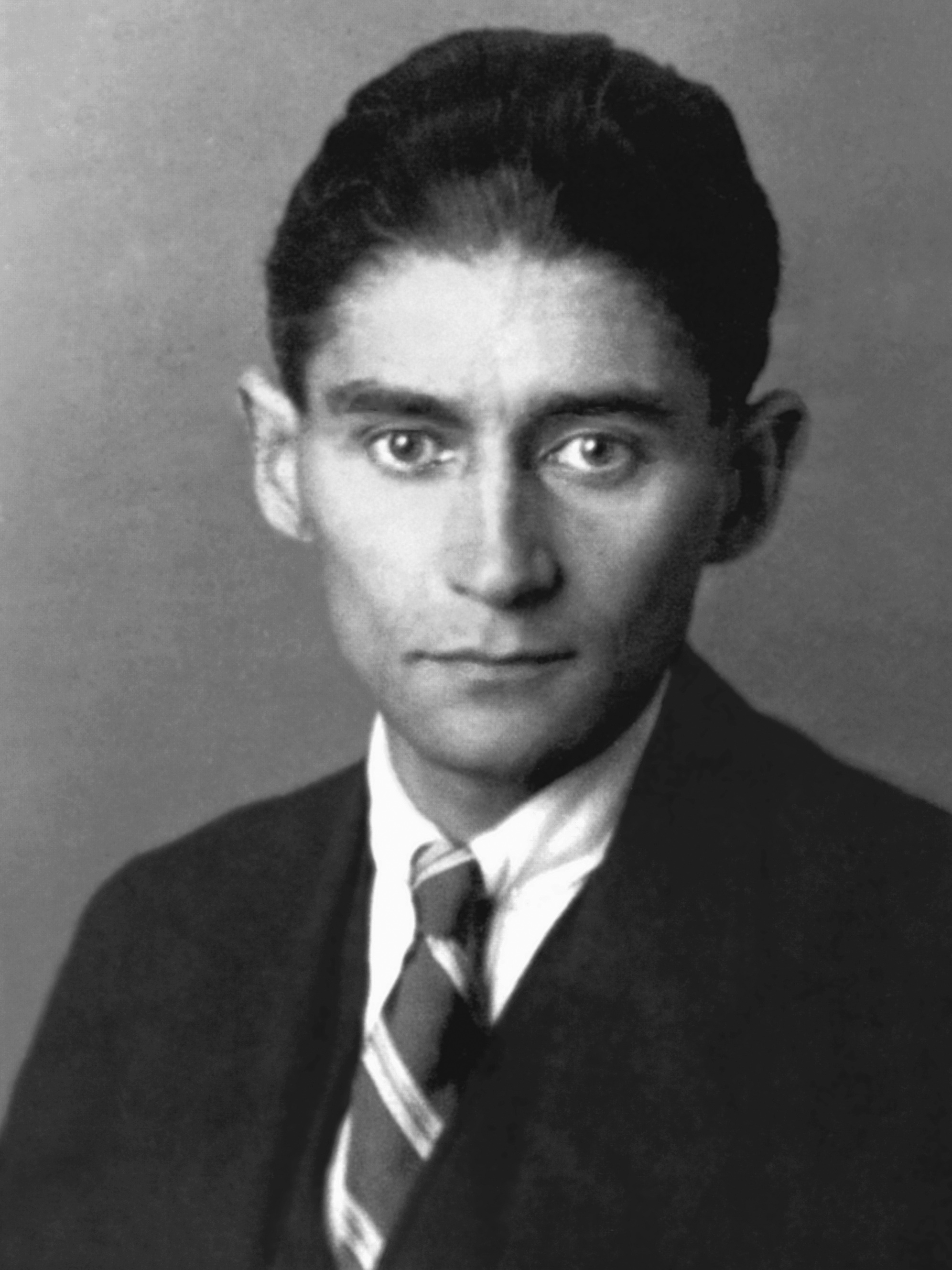
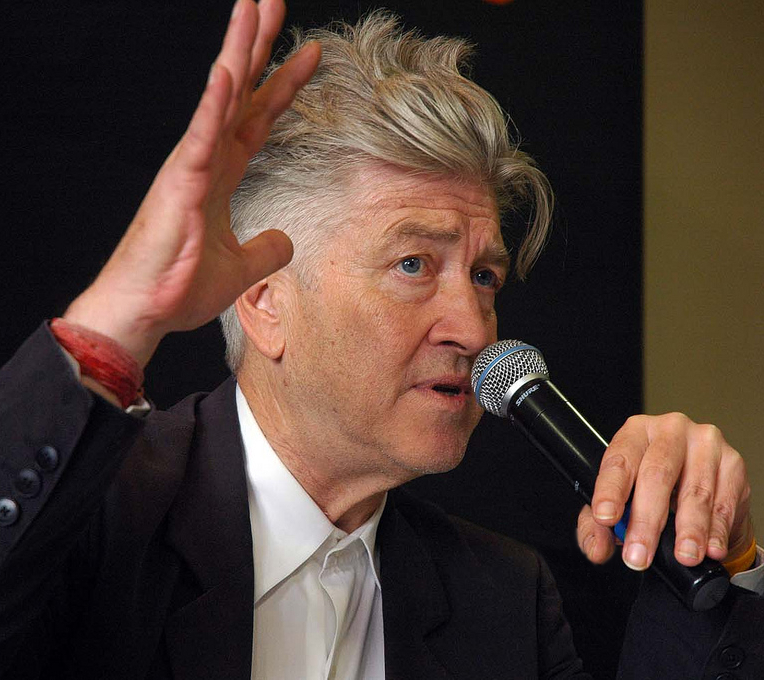
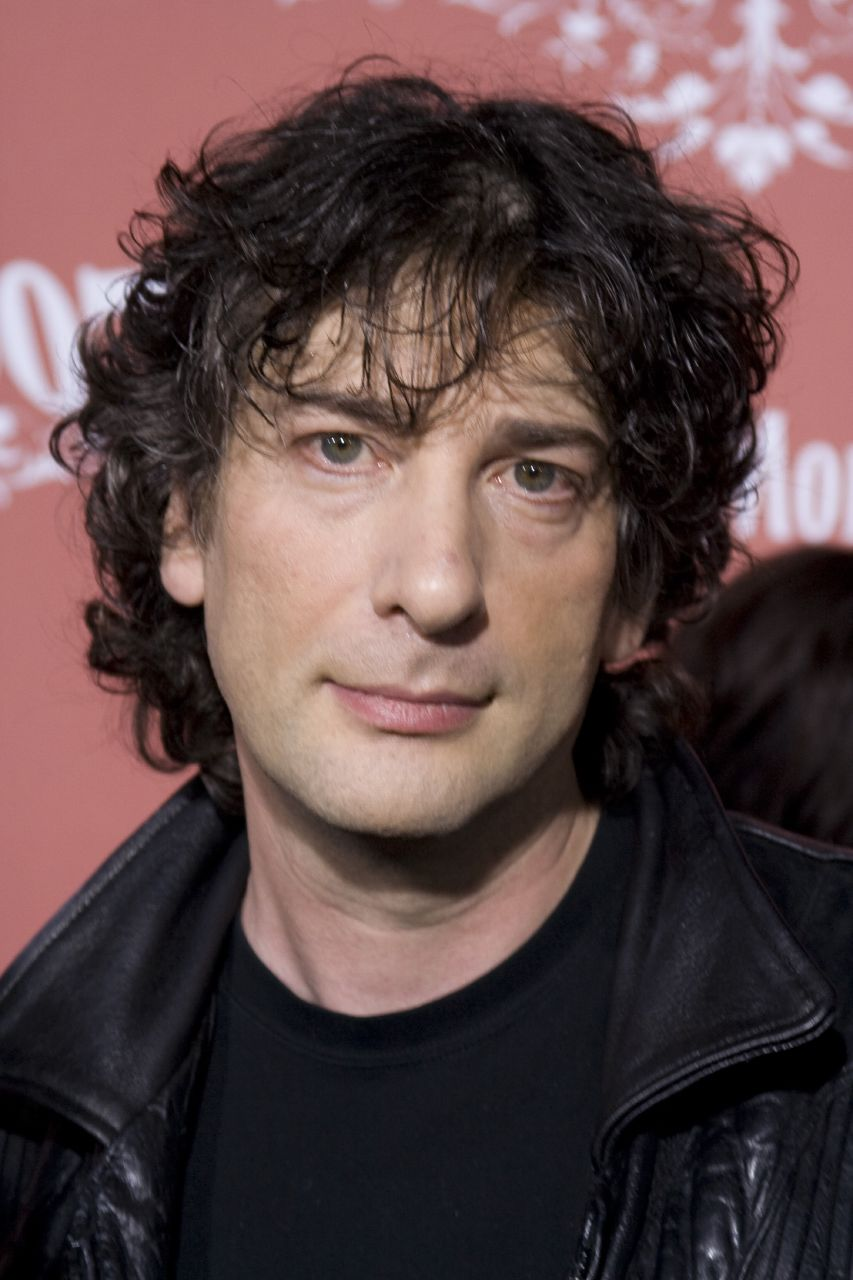
The works of Franz Kafka (left, pictured in 1923), David Lynch (center, pictured in 2007) and Neil Gaiman (right, pictured in 2007) were counted among as influences on the film.

Prithviraj Hegde noted that No Smoking could be cheered at film festivals, but that "it sure won't either at a suburban multiplex nor a tent cinema in Tamil Nadu or Bihar." Gautaman Bhaskaran also found it "unlikely to get into the commercial circuit." The film was released in 225 screens in India. It had an opening weekend gross of ₹2.17 crore (equivalent to ₹7.1 crore or US$760,000 in 2026) worldwide. It ultimately bombed at the box-office, grossing ₹3.49 crore (equivalent to ₹11 crore or US$1.2 million in 2026) against a budget of ₹7.50 crore (equivalent to ₹25 crore or US$2.6 million in 2026). (Note: Budget figure includes print and advertising costs)

No Smoking received negative reviews from critics, with many dismissing it as self-indulgent and confusing, though international reviews were considerably positive. (Note: Attributed to multiple references) According to Sudhish Kamath, after watching the film, critics wondered what influence Kashyap was under. On the review aggregator website Rotten Tomatoes, 55% of 11 critics' reviews are positive, with an average rating of 5.3/10. The film baffled audiences with its abstract storyline. Kashyap himself joked that "only people from the outer universe understood it."

Reviewers noted the film to be influenced by the works of Franz Kafka (particularly The Trial), David Lynch, Lars Von Trier, Neil Gaiman, and graphic novels in general, as well as American conspiracy thriller films (particularly The Game and Seconds), Schindler's List and Being John Malkovich. (Note: Attributed to multiple references) Critics variously identified it as a black comedy, a film noir, a neo-noir, a surreal film or a thriller film. (Note: Attributed to multiple references)

The film was criticised for its cryptic storytelling and ambition. Rajeev Masand criticised its "intentionally incohesive screenplay and bizarre dialogue." Phelim O'Neill and Times of India found it illogical. Indu Mirani said that "understanding its plot's many forward and backward movements would be out of the scope of the layman." Khalid Mohamed and Taran Adarsh failed to grasp what was going on in the film. Prithviraj Hegde called it "a bad dream, peopled with strange characters and situations" which "spins into a downward spiral that's unreal, incomprehensible and leaves you dazed." Tajpal Rathore found its "shoddy screenplay stale, and its situations laughable." Jay Weissberg and Manish Gajjar called it confusing.

The cast performances were praised by Rathore. Abraham's performance, praised by Bhaskaran, Mirani, Gajjar and Adarsh (to a lesser extent), was criticised by Sinanan and Mohamed, the latter quipping that he "still has to learn the A B C of acting." (Note: Attributed to multiple references) Despite finding her attractive, Adarsh, Mirani and Mohamed criticised Takia's performance, saying that she mechanically sleepwalks through her part. In contrast, Gajjar was impressed by her. Bhaskaran and Gajjar found Rawal's performance as brilliantly essayed, with verve. Though, Adarsh and Mirani were less positive, merely noting his "okay" performance. Adarsh and Mirani were disappointed by Shorey, particularly in comparison to his previous roles.

Cinematography was complimented by many critics. Adarsh went so far as to suggest that cinematography was the film's "only aspect that stands out." (Note: Attributed to multiple references) The score captivated Gajjar. Adarsh conceded that "Jab Bhi" dance sequence was "imaginatively filmed." Weissberg found the visuals "self-indulgent." Masand, Bhaskaran and Adarsh criticised the film's lack of entertainment value. The flashback scene of K and Abbas smoking in the toilet was described as entertaining and hilarious, and "genuinely clever." Weissberg considered Hitler's gas chamber references "plain offensive," and the film tonally confused. Mohamed and Gajjar joked that after watching the film, smokers won't quit smoking, and even non-smokers "will be gagging for a fag!" The abundance of references prompted Sinanan to remark that "spotting what's been stolen from where is really the only reason" to watch the film. Comparisons were made to Black Friday, Mulholland Drive, Twin Peaks, Saw, Naach, The Matrix Reloaded, Lost and music videos. (Note: Attributed to multiple references)

Commenting on the unfavourable reception, Kashyap stated that people would understand the film "after they get over the shock." At the 53rd Filmfare Awards, it received two nominations: Best Cinematography and Best Art Direction. At the 5th Annual Central European Bollywood Awards, the film received four nominations: Best Supporting Actor (Rawal), Best Cinematography, Best Editing and Best Special Effects. The film was honoured at the 2011 Indian Film Festival. In a 2011 interview, Kashyap stated that he loves No Smoking the most. In a 2013 interview, Abraham named the film his favourite, and his performance "his best till date." He went on to claim that the film played a part in Anil Kapoor getting cast for Slumdog Millionaire. In a 2024 interview, Abhishek Pathak called the film a masterpiece. Saloni Gajjar singled out Kashyap's subsequent films Dev.D, Gulaal, Raman Raghav 2.0 and Manmarziyaan as springing from the film and its "bold, methodical, surprising approach that demands its viewers make their own interpretations," and how the film ultimately "set up a boundary-pushing filmmaker." It has since gained a cult following. However it remains one of the least appreciated films in Kashyap's career.

Abraham first expressed his interest in a sequel to Kashyap in 2013. After Abraham reiterated his interest again in 2025, Kashyap said that he needs a thrilling, appropriate and unique subject matter to move forward with it.

== See also ==
- Julie Ganapathi (2003), the first Indian Stephen King film adaptation
- Woh (1998 television series), the first Hindi-language Stephen King adaptation
- List of cult films
- List of Hindi films of 2007
- List of box-office bombs
- List of films featuring surveillance
- List of films released by Eros International
