= Rajasimha I =

Rajasimha may refer to:

- Rajasinha I of Sitawaka, king of Sitawaka in Sri Lanka from 1581 to 1593
- Maravarman Rajasimha I, Pandyan king of south India

== See also ==
- Rajasimha (disambiguation)
