= Rajasimha II =

Rajasimha II may refer to:

- Rajasinha II of Kandy, Sinhala king of Kandy
- Maravarman Rajasimha II, Pandyan king of south India

== See also ==
- Rajasimha (disambiguation)
