= Aarti Bajaj =

Indian film editor (born 1973)

- Born: 10 February 1973 (age 53); Delhi, India
- Occupation: Film editor
- Years active: 1995–present
- Spouse: Anurag Kashyap (m. 1997; div. 2009)

Aarti Bajaj (born 10 February 1973) is an Indian film editor who predominantly works in Hindi cinema. Known for her award–winning work on critically acclaimed films such as Black Friday, she is best known for her frequent collaborations with filmmakers Anurag Kashyap and Imtiaz Ali.

== Career ==
Bajaj began her editing career with Anurag Kashyap's unreleased film Paanch. She followed it with his controversial and acclaimed film Black Friday for which she was nominated for a Star Screen Award in 2008. She has also edited Reema Kagti's Honeymoon Travels Pvt. Ltd., Rajkumar Gupta's Aamir, for which she was nominated for her second Star Screen Award, and all of Imtiaz Ali's films beginning with Jab We Met. Later, she edited Kashyap's Dev.D, Gulaal, Ugly, Raman Raghav 2.0, Mukkabaaz, Sacred Games and Manmarziyaan.

== Filmography ==
Key
†	Denotes films that have not yet been released

Year	Film	Notes and Ref.
1999	Last Train to Mahakali	Short film
2003	Paanch	Unreleased
2007	Salaam-e-Ishq	
2007	Black Friday	
2007	Honeymoon Travels Pvt. Ltd.	
2007	No Smoking	
2007	Jab We Met	
2008	Aamir	
2008	Maharathi	
2009	Dev.D	
2009	Gulaal	
2009	Love Aaj Kal	
2010	Karthik Calling Karthik	
2010	Mumbai Cutting	Segment: "Pramod Bhai 23"
2010	Do Dooni Chaar	
2011	No One Killed Jessica	
2011	Rockstar	
2012	Paan Singh Tomar	Nominated—Screen Award for Best Editing
2012	Ishaqzaade	
2013	Ugly	Nominated—Filmfare Award for Best Editing
2013	Ghanchakkar	
2014	Highway	Nominated—Filmfare Award for Best Editing
2014	Revolver Rani	
2015	Tamasha	Won—FOI Online Award for Best
2016	Love Shagun	
2016	Raman Raghav 2.0	
2017	Jab Harry Met Sejal	
2017	Mukkabaaz	
2018	Cake	Pakistani film
2018	Manmarziyaan	
2019	Albert Pinto Ko Gussa Kyun Aata Hai?	
2020	Love Aaj Kal	Released on Netflix
2021	Shaadisthan	Released on Disney+ Hotstar
2022	Thar	Released on Netflix
2022	Dobaaraa	
2024	Amar Singh Chamkila	Released on Netflix
2025	Nishaanchi	
2025	Nishaanchi Part 2	
2026	Bandar	
2026	Main Vaapas Aaunga	

Year	Title	Notes and Ref.
2018–2019	Sacred Games	Won—Asian Academy Creative Award for Best Editing
2023	Jubilee	Released on Amazon Prime Video
2023	Choona	Released on Netflix
