= Tariq Umar Khan =

Indian designer (born 1976)

Tariq Umar Khan (born 12 September 1976) is an Indian production designer, art director, and film director who works in Bollywood (Hindi cinema). His film The Good Road was selected as the Indian entry for the Best Foreign Language Film at the 86th Academy Awards.

== Early life and background ==
Tariq Umar Khan was born and brought up in Ayodhya Uttar Pradesh in Abdul Sattar Khan s/o Laal khan house. He is married to Nadiri Tariq Khan and is a father of two daughter Filzah khan and Hifza khan . Tariq is the son of Late Abdul Sattar Khan, who was working as a bus conductor in Mumbai. Under his elder brother, H Umar Khan, a known Art Director, he got a chance to work in the crown studio with a studio manager. Tariq got inspired by the passion of late Mr. Sameer Chanda, who had the office in the same studio. Tariq have seen working Sameer chanda of working for so many commercial and TV series, that's attracted to art direction. He worked in the crown studio for twelve years. Later on, in 2005, he worked as a manager for Wasiq Khan from 2005 onward then he became team leader but during working with him Wasiq Khan slowly pushed him into art direction. For 9 year, from 2005 to 2013 August in more than 40 films Wasiq and Tariq were together., .

== Career ==
He is known for his gritty realism in Anurag Kashyap films like No Smoking, Victory, Lamhaa, Wanted, Maharathi, Tanu Weds Manu, Ladies vs Ricky Bahl, Gangs of Wasseypur, Bobby Jasoos, Dolly Ki Doli, Durgamati Pati patni aur woh Inspector Avinash webseries Taaza Khabar webseries 1 &2 and the Oscar nominee The Good Road. He has also worked in mainstream films including Shagird, Besharam, Dabangg(2010), Rowdy Rathore, Raanjhanaa (2013), and Goliyon Ki Raasleela Ram-Leela (2013) directed by Sanjay Leela Bhansali.

He started his career in crown studio as a manager worked there from 1995 to 2004 and got inspired by late Samir Chanda (5 times national award winner production designer) as his office was in a same studio. Tariq got the opportunity to observe his work carefully and started learning art direction and production design. He also learned art direction under his brother H Umar Khan during his job in crown studio, then he joined Wasiq Khan as a team leader and accountant but during working with him Wasiq Khan slowly pushed him into art direction. For 9 year, from 2005 to 2013 August in more than 40 films Wasiq and Tariq were together.

Tariq Umar Khan's name came in major news when The Good Road went to Oscar from India. His first Directorial Debut Film Guilt (short) won Jury award in Mumbai film festival. He was also a recipient of the Sanchar time media award (New Delhi) in 2015 & Lokmat Janak award by Uttar Pradesh Vidhansabha Adhyaksh Shri Hriday Narayan Dixit 2019, Filmfare Award for Film Lahoriye 2017 for his remarkable work in Indian cinema production design field.

Tariq also worked as art director and production designer in commercial for many reputed production houses like chrome pictures, Jamic films, Blink pictures, Dungarpur films, wild baba production, CINEVIDYA (wow) and Serial promos for Star plus, life OK and hot star. He is also doing new age web series Taaza khabar on Disney hotstar, Rafta Rafta on Amazon Mini, Inspector Avinash on Jio Cinema, and work for many production houses and internet companies.

== Awards and recognitions ==
He was honored for his work by Sanchar Time media group for production design work. Tariq won jury award in Paraj Film Festival for his directorial Debut Short Film "Guilt" and won Festival mention award in MSIFF for the same short film as a Director. His short film was additionally welcomed for screening in Amity University Noida for Time Code Film Festival and he gave the lecture on Production Designinghe also won Filmfare award for Punjabi film Lahoriye as production Designer.his second Directorial film Mi'raj won 6 awards for him and 2 nominations.

== Filmography ==
=== As Art Director ===
- Dolly Ki Doli (2015)
- Besharam (2013)
- Raanjhanaa (2013)
- Meridian Lines (2013)
- Accident on Hill Road (2010)
- Shahrukh Bola 'Khoobsurat Hai Tu'... And She Believed in It (2010)
- VICTORY (2009)
- No Smoking (2007 film)

=== As Production Designer ===
• Kaal trighori (2024) • Fateh (2024) •Banda Singh (2023)

•Single Salma (2023)

•Vadh (2023)

•Rafta Rafta (2023)

•Taaza Khabar (2023)

•Holy cow (2022)

•Aafat e ishq (2021)

•collor Bomb (2021

- Durgamati (2020)
- Pati Patni aur woh 2019
- Inspector Avinash Web series (2023)
- Pariwar Web series 2020
- Motichoor Chaknachoor (2019)
- Satellite Shankar2019
- Pranaam (2019)
- Jhalki (2019)
- Mona Darling (2017)
- Irada (2017 film)
- Lahoriye (2017)
- Dolly Ki Doli (2015)
- Bobby Jasoos (2014)
- Babloo Happy Hai (2014)
- The Persian (Short) (completed) (2014)
- Kaun Kitne Panee Mein (completed) (2014)
- The Good Road (2013))

=== Miscellaneous ===
- Goliyon Ki Rasleela Ram-Leela (associate production Designer - uncredited) 2013
- Rowdy Rathore (associate production designer) 2012
- Gangs of Wasseypur (art team co ordinator) 2012
- Ladies vs. Ricky Bahl (associate production designer) 2011
- Miley - Naa Miley - Hum (associate production designer) 2011
- Shaitan (art team co ordinator) 2011
- Shagird (associate production designer) 2011
- Mumbai Cutting (associate production designer) 2011
- Tanu Weds Manu (associate production designer) 2010
- Dabangg (associate production designer) 2010
- Lamhaa: The Untold Story of Kashmir (associate production designer) 2010
- Striker (associate production designer) 2010
- Radio: Love on Air (associate production designer) 2009
- Wanted (assistant art director) 2009
- Aagey Se Right (assistant art director) 2009
- Aa Dekhen Zara (assistant art director) 2009
- Gulaal (assistant art director) 2009
- 13B: Fear Has a New Address (assistant art director) 2009
- Maharathi (assistant art director) 2008
- Hansie: A True Story (assistant art director) 2008
- Shaurya: It Takes Courage to Make Right... Right (assistant art director) 2008
- Dharm (assistant art director) 2007
- Shakalaka Boom Boom (construction coordinator) 2007
- Shoonya (assistant art director) 2006
- Taxi No. 9 2 11: Nau Do Gyarah (assistant art director) 2006
- Anjaane: The Unknown (construction coordinator) 2005
- Be-Lagaam (construction coordinator) 2002
