= Shaadisthan =

- Release poster
- Directed by: Raj Singh Chaudhary
- Written by: Raj Singh Chaudhary; Kartik Chaudhry; Nishank Verma
- Produced by: Anant Roongta; Sanjay Shekhar Shetty
- Starring: Nivedita Bhattacharya; Nina Borah; Sanjay Dadhich; Kirti Kulhari; Kay Kay Menon; Medha Shankr; Siddharth Tripathy
- Cinematography: Sushil Rajpal
- Edited by: Aarti Bajaj
- Music by: Nakul Sharma; Sahil Bhatia; Swaroop Khan; Ajay Jayanthi
- Production companies: Famous Studios; Opticus INC
- Distributed by: Disney+ Hotstar
- Release date: 11 June 2021
- Running time: 94 minutes
- Country: India
- Language: Hindi

Shaadisthan is a 2021 Indian Hindi-language drama musical film directed by Raj Singh Chaudhary starring Kirti Kulhari. The film is produced under the production company Famous Digital Studio and distributed by Disney+ Hotstar Multiplex. The story is based on women's empowerment.

== Plot ==
Arshi and her parents are bound to travel from Mumbai to Ajmer for her cousin Cholu's wedding but they miss their flight. Arshi who was unwilling to travel to the wedding had earlier gone into hiding at her friend's place, but she returns after her mother pleads with her on the phone to do so. Cholu tells Arshi's father Papaji that his friend's music troupe is travelling on their bus to Ajmer to perform at his wedding and that he has arranged their travel with them. The next day Arshi and her parents reach the scheduled place and start their journey. Her father disapproves of the troupe's habits such as using expletives, drinking and smoking early in the morning.

Sasha is the lead singer of the troupe. Imad and Jigme are other members and are courteous towards the family. Sasha is a modern girl who calls a spade a spade and hits back at Papaji when he casually remarks that their music is noise. Arshi is in a sombre mood and does not speak when the troupe members try to interact with her. This further angers Papaji. However his wife tries to calm down his nerves. Slowly, the ice between Arshi's parents and the troupe breaks and they start interacting freely.

Somewhere in the afternoon, they halt in the middle of the highway to take a break. As the troupe members are outside and the family is inside the bus, Papaji scolds Arshi for her stone-cold attitude. Arshi cannot take it anymore and runs out in the open and cries her heart out. The troupe members try to console her. She tells them that she would turn 18 the next day and would get engaged at the wedding ceremony of Cholu. The troupe members are shocked but realise that they are helpless. Arshi tells them that she had run away to her friend's place, but could not see her mother crying and pleading, so she returned. Her mother cares about Arshi, but has silently submitted herself to the archaic societal practices. Her parents are under the pressure of being ostractised from their extended family and social circle if they do not follow traditional rites. Arshi tells them that on one side she cannot see her mother crying and pleading to her and on the other end she cannot imagine her future with an unknown person at such tender age.

In the evening when they enter Udaipur, Papaji gets down for personal work and the rest of them take a detour to the hotel of Tiger, a mutual friend and plan to rest for an hour or so. Tiger is a gracious host and strikes a chord with Arshi's mother who was initially reluctant to get out of the bus. All of them have a good time at the hotel with some dance and music. Later we see the troupe in deep slumber at a Dhaba. The owner of the Dhaba answers the call on Arshi's mother's phone and wakes her up. Cholu who had called her tells her that Papaji is trying to connect them for a long time and tells her to send him their location immediately. She runs towards the bus and finds everyone asleep. She wakes up Arshi and she sends Papaji the location of the place. Jigme later realises that Tiger had laced their tea with Opium, which everyone seems to have enjoyed. Arshi's mother and Sasha start cooking dinner because the Dhaba has run out of food. While cooking, Sasha confronts her with very pointed and intimate questions and for most of them, she has a negative answer. Finally, she acknowledges that she has followed societal norms dedicated towards family and in this process completely forgotten about her intimate and personal feelings. Sasha tells her that being a free-spirited girl, she admires her sacrifices for the family but indirectly questions if she would want the same fate for Arshi.

After an eventful journey the next day they reach the wedding venue and settle in their respective rooms. On the eve of the wedding, Papaji faces humiliation from his sister and brother-in-law because he brought just half a million rupees for the wedding, while they were expecting at least 2-3 times that amount. They remind him that because of their efforts they are able to marry their daughter in a reputed family. He is deeply hurt by this humiliation and forced to rethink his understanding of the societal structure and his daughter's future. Arshi tells the troupe that she wants to spend the night with them. Sasha conveys this to her mother and they continue their discussion from the previous night. She does acknowledge the merit in her argument and at the same time expresses that, like music notes, everyone has a different approach to life. Later in the night, Arshi's parents have an intimate conversation after a long time and Arshi's mother tells Papaji that from the bottom of her heart she truly does not care about the societal norms, which also strikes a chord with him.

The next day we see the entire family happily boarding the music troupe's bus back to Mumbai.

== Cast ==
- Kirti Kulhari as Sasha, a rockstar and lead singer of her band
- Medha Shankr as Arshi Modi, a girl who just turned 18
- Nivedita Bhattacharya as mother of arshi modi
- Nishank Verma as Cholu
- Nina Borah as Cholu's bride
- Sanjay Dadhich
- Kay Kay Menon as Tiger Ji / Rajaji
- Rajan Modi as Papaji, father of Arshi modu
- Siddharth Tripathy as Olu

== Reception ==
Lakshana N Palat of The Indian Express gave the film 2 out of 5 stars and stated, "In her role as Sasha, Kirti Kulhari just glowers at others, directing a snarky comment at anyone who interferes in her space. But she’s the heroine in the show, and you know you have to root for her." Ronak Kotecha of Times of India gave the film 2 out of 5 stars and stated, "Shaadisthan embarks on the road less taken, but never reaches its destination to truly engage and entertain its audience." ABP Live gave the film 2 out of 5 stars and stated, "That, though, is clearly not enough an attraction to make this film interesting. Shaadisthan is the story that ought to be told right now -- only, not in the way they ended up doing it." Rahul Desai of Film Companion gave the film a negative review and stated, "If only films like Shaadisthan stopped preaching altogether, perhaps we all wouldn’t feel like a bunch of unruly kids trapped in a confession booth."

== Soundtrack ==
Shaadisthan

Soundtrack album by Nakul Sharma, Sahil Bhatia, Swaroop Khan and Ajay Jayanthi
- Released: 16 June 2021
- Recorded: 2020
- Genre: Feature film soundtrack
- Length: 21:31
- Language: Hindi
- Label: Zee Music Company

Official audio
- Shaadisthan – Full Album on YouTube

The film's soundtrack is composed by Nakul Sharma, Sahil Bhatia, Swaroop Khan and Ajay Jayanthi whereas lyrics being written by Sahil Bhatia, Nakul Sharma, Apurv Dogra, Ajay Jayanthi, Kunal Singh Chauhan, Swaroop Khan, Surbhi Dashputra and Amir Khusrau.

Track listing
No.	Title	Lyrics	Music	Singer(s)	Length
1.	"Yeh Sach"	Sahil Bhatia, Nakul Sharma, Apurv Dogra	Nakul Sharma, Sahil Bhatia	Mansheel Gujral, Ajay Jayanthi, Apurv Dogra	4:27
2.	"Leheriyera"	Nakul Sharma, Sahil Bhatia, Ajay Jayanthi, Kunal Singh Chauhan	Nakul Sharma, Sahil Bhatia	Isheeta Chakrvarty, Swaroop Khan, Ajay Jayanthi, Apurv Dogra	3:57
3.	"Hichki"	Swaroop Khan, Surbhi Dashputra	Nakul Sharma, Sahil Bhatia	Isheeta Chakrvarty, Swaroop Khan	5:07
4.	"Kirpa Karo"	Amir Khusrau	Nakul Sharma, Sahil Bhatia, Swaroop Khan	Swaroop Khan	4:01
5.	"Secret Annexe"	-	Ajay Jayanthi	Instrumental	4:11
6.	"The Pushkar Song"	-	Ajay Jayanthi	Instrumental	1:49
Total length:					23:31
