= Himanshi Choudhry =

British actress

- Born: Manchester, United Kingdom
- Occupation: Actress
- Years active: 2004–present
- Known for: Tu Aashiqui; Inside Edge

Himanshi Choudhry is a British actress. She is known for playing Sheetal Dhanrajgir in Tu Aashiqui and Sudha Dhawan in Inside Edge.

== Early life and career ==
Choudhry was born in Manchester to Indian parents and grew up in New Delhi, India. She made her film debut in the 2008 movie Antardwand, which won the National Film Award for Best Film on Other Social Issues.

== Filmography ==
=== Film ===
Year	Title	Role	Notes
2003	Ishq Vishq	Priya	credited as Himanshi
2008	Antardwand	Sia	credited as Himanshi, Lead
2022	Dobaaraa	Sheela Aunty	
2024	Savi	Ayesha Hassan	

=== Television ===
Year	Title	Role	Notes
2004	Lavanya	Tanya	Debut
2004–2005	Des Mein Niklla Hoga Chand	Dingy Singh Kent / Dingy Akash Mehra	
2006–2008	Banoo Main Teri Dulhann	Mahua Singh	
2015	Dil Ki Baatein Dil Hi Jaane	Manika Kapoor	
2015	Devlok with Devdutt Pattanaik	Presenter	
2016	Shaadi Boys	Ruby	
2017–2018	Tu Aashiqui	Sheetal Rajput / Sheetal Dhanrajgir	

=== Web series ===
Year	Title	Role	Notes
2017–2021	Inside Edge	Sudha Dhawan	Amazon Prime Video
2019	Out of Love	Ritu Mehra	Hotstar
2021	Hostages	Kanika Arora	Hotstar
2022	The Great Indian Murder	Rita Sethi	Hotstar
