= Raj Kumar Singh (disambiguation) =

Rajkumar Singh or Raj Kumar Singh may refer to:

- Lal Pratap Singh (Rajkumar Lal Pratap Singh; died 1858), Indian independence activist
- R. K. Singh (Raj Kumar Singh; born 1952), Member of the Lok Sabha, the lower house of the Parliament of India (from 2014)
- Raj Kumar Dorendra Singh (1934–2018), Chief Minister of the Indian state of Manipur (1992–1993)
- Raj Kumar Jaichandra Singh (born 1942), Chief Minister of the Indian state of Manipur (1988–1990)
- Raj Kumar Ranbir Singh (died 2016), Chief Minister of the Indian state of Manipur (1990–1992)
- Rajkumar Achouba Singh (born 1938), Indian Manipuri dancer (Raas and Lai Haraoba forms) and teacher
- Rajkumar Jhalajit Singh (born 1924), Indian political activist, journalist, historian and educator
- Rajkumar Shitaljit Singh (1913–2008), Indian writer, translator and educator
- Rajkumar Singhajit Singh (born 1935), Indian Manipuri dancer (primarily Pung cholom and Raslila forms) and choreographer
- Rajkumar Singh (cricketer) (born 2000), Indian cricketer

== See also ==
- Raj Singh (disambiguation)
- Rajkumari Singh (disambiguation)
