= Rajkumari Singh (disambiguation) =

Rajkumari Singh may refer to:

- Rajkumari Singh (1923-1979), Guyanese writer, activist
- Ratna Singh (Rajkumari Ratna Singh; born 1959), Indian politician

== See also ==
- Rajkumar Singh (disambiguation)
