= Abhimanyu Singh =

Indian actor

Abhimanyu Singh (Sampat)
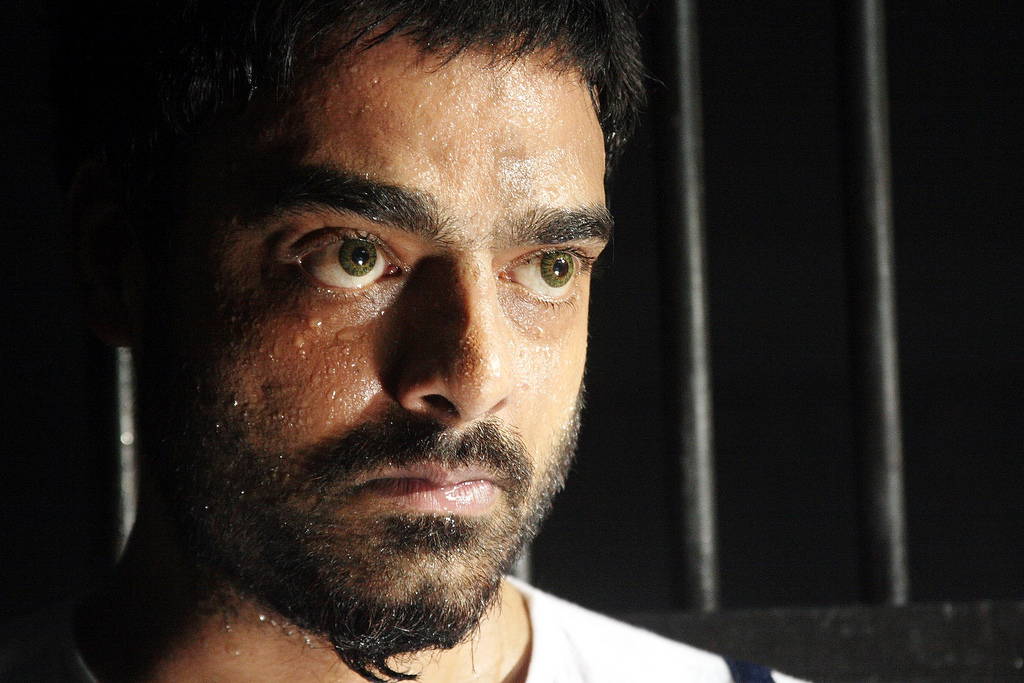
- Singh in Rakta Charitra
- Born: Abhimanyu Shekhar Singh; Sonpur, Bihar, India
- Occupation: Actor
- Years active: 1995–present
- Spouse: Sargam Singh (m. 2008)

Abhimanyu Singh is an Indian actor who predominantly works in Hindi, Telugu , Malayalam and Tamil films. He is notably known for his roles in the political films Gulaal (2009) and Rakta Charitra (2010), Thalaivaa (2013) and L2: Empuraan (2025).

== Career ==
Abhimanyu Singh made his debut with the film Aks, directed by Rakeysh Omprakash Mehra. His first major role was in the 2009 film Gulaal, directed by Anurag Kashyap. His performance in the film won him the 2010 Stardust Award for best breakthrough performance.

His performance in the 2010 gangster film Rakta Charitra, directed by Ram Gopal Varma, earned him critical acclaim. He also received praise for his performance as a corrupt police officer in director Onir's critically acclaimed anthology film I Am.

In 2017, he starred alongside Sridevi in the film Mom. Singh worked with director Anil Sharma for the film Genius (2018) where he portrayed a CBI officer.

== Filmography ==
=== Film ===
Year	Title	Role	Language	Notes
2001	Aks	Inspector Srivastava	Hindi	
2004	Lakshya	Lieutenant Colonel Pratap Singh	Hindi	
2007	Dhol	Rahul Tripathi	Hindi	
2007	It's Breaking News		Hindi	
2008	Jannat	Shakeel	Hindi	
2009	Gulaal	Rananjay Singh	Hindi	
2009	Accident on Hill Road	Sid	Hindi	
2010	The Film Emotional Atyachar	Bosco	Hindi	
2010	I Am	Police Officer	Hindi	
2010	Rakta Charitra	Rajidi Bukka Reddy	Hindi	Bilingual film
2010	Rakta Charitra	Rajidi Bukka Reddy	Telugu	Bilingual film
2010	Rakta Charitra 2	Rajidi Bukka Reddy	Hindi	Cameo appearance
2010	Rakta Charitra 2	Rajidi Bukka Reddy	Telugu	Cameo appearance
2011	Nenu Naa Rakshasi	Gangster Ratna	Telugu	
2011	Velayudham	Musafir Ibrahim	Tamil	
2011	Bejawada	Shankar Prasad	Telugu	
2012	Gabbar Singh	Siddhappa Naidu	Telugu	
2012	Department	DK	Hindi	
2012	Aalaap		Hindi	
2013	Thalaivaa	Bhima Bhai	Tamil	
2013	Dalam	Ladda	Telugu	
2013	Dalam	Ladda	Tamil	
2013	Once Upon Ay Time in Mumbai Dobaara!	ACP Ashish Sawant	Hindi	
2013	Goliyon Ki Raasleela Ram-Leela	Meghji Bhai	Hindi	
2014	Mukunda	Ranga	Telugu	
2015	Mosagallaku Mosagadu	Rudra	Telugu	
2015	Pandaga Chesko	Shankar	Telugu	
2015	Premji: Rise of a Warrior	Meghji	Gujarati	
2015	Shivam	Abhi	Telugu	
2015	Jazbaa	Abbas Yusuf	Hindi	
2015	10 Endrathukulla	Pooran Singh	Tamil	
2016	Global Baba	Chillam Pehlawan / Global Baba	Hindi	
2016	Attack	Sattu	Telugu	
2016	Eedo Rakam Aado Rakam	Gaja	Telugu	
2016	Chakravyuha	Sadashivayya	Kannada	
2016	Chuttalabbai	ACP Gautam Krishna	Telugu	
2017	Mom	Jagan Singh	Hindi	
2017	Jai Lava Kusa	Rudhra Tiwari	Telugu	
2017	Theeran Adhigaaram Ondru	Omveer Singh	Tamil	
2017	Oxygen	Chalapathi	Telugu	
2018	Genius	Mr.Praveen Joshi	Hindi	
2018	Amar Akbar Anthony	Balwant Khagre	Telugu	
2019	Sita	CI Mukesh Murari	Telugu	
2020	Taish	Kujinder Brar	Hindi	
2021	State of Siege: Temple Attack	Abu Hamza	Hindi	
2021	Bhavai	Bhawai	Hindi	
2021	Annaatthe	Manoj Parekar	Tamil	
2021	Sooryavanshi	Riyaz Hafeez	Hindi	
2022	Bachchhan Paandey	Pendulum	Hindi	
2022	Home Minister		Kannada	
2022	Nikamma	MLA Vikramjeet Bisht	Hindi	
2022	Ladki: Dragon Girl		Hindi	
2023	Selfiee	Suraj Diwan	Hindi	
2023	Kisi Ka Bhai Kisi Ki Jaan	Tyagi	Hindi	
2023	Aazam	Kadar	Hindi	
2023	Takkar	Raaz	Tamil	
2023	Rules Ranjann	Kadar	Telugu	
2024	Luv You Shankar	Siddheshwar	Hindi	Voiceover
2024	Devara: Part 1	Tulasi	Telugu	
2025	L2: Empuraan	Balraj Patel / Baba Bajrangi	Malayalam	
2025	Suryapet Junction	Narasimha	Telugu	
2025	Interrogation		Hindi	
2025	They Call Him OG	Inspector Tawde	Telugu	
2025	Laila	Rustum	Telugu	
2026	One Two Cha Cha Chaa	Bhura Singh	Hindi	
2026	Batwara 1947	Yaqoob Pehalwan	Hindi	

=== Television ===
Year	Title	Role	Channel
1995	Aahat	Neeraj / Sekhar	Sony Entertainment Television
1995–1998	Swabhimaan	Ronnie Banerjee	DD National
1996–1997	Yug	Commissioner Sahib	DD National
1997–1999	Saturday Suspense	Sukhdev Pawar	Zee TV
1997–1999	Saturday Suspense	Inspector	Zee TV
1998	Saturday Suspense	Shreekant Gokhale	Zee TV
1999	Suspense Hour	Dharmesh	Zee TV
1999	Star Bestsellers	episodic appearance	Star Plus
2000	Thriller At 10 - Chor Pe Mor	Professor Ravi Desai	Star Plus
2002	Kumkum – Ek Pyara Sa Bandhan	Vishal Malhotra	Star Plus
2002–2003	Kkusum	Ajay Maliya	Sony TV
2003	Ssshhhh...Koi Hai	Aditya	Star Plus
2003	Saara Akaash	Air Force Officer	Star Plus
2008–2009	Ssshhhh...Phir Koi Hai	Partho	STAR One
2008–2009	Ssshhhh...Phir Koi Hai	Inspector Jhujjar Singh	STAR One
2012–2013	Upanishad Ganga	Sutradhar	DD Bharati
2018–2024	Chacha Vidhyayak Hain Humare	Chachaji aka Ashwini Pathak	Amazon Prime Video
2020–present	Bhaukaal	Shaukeen	MX Player
2022	Khakee: The Bihar Chapter	Ranjan Kumar	Netflix
2023	Inspector Avinash	Devi	JioCinema
2026	Cocaine	Inspector Jalal, Mumbai Police	JioHotstar
2026	Adarsh Baal Vidyalaya	Hansraj Meena	Prime Video
