= Vikas Vidyalaya =

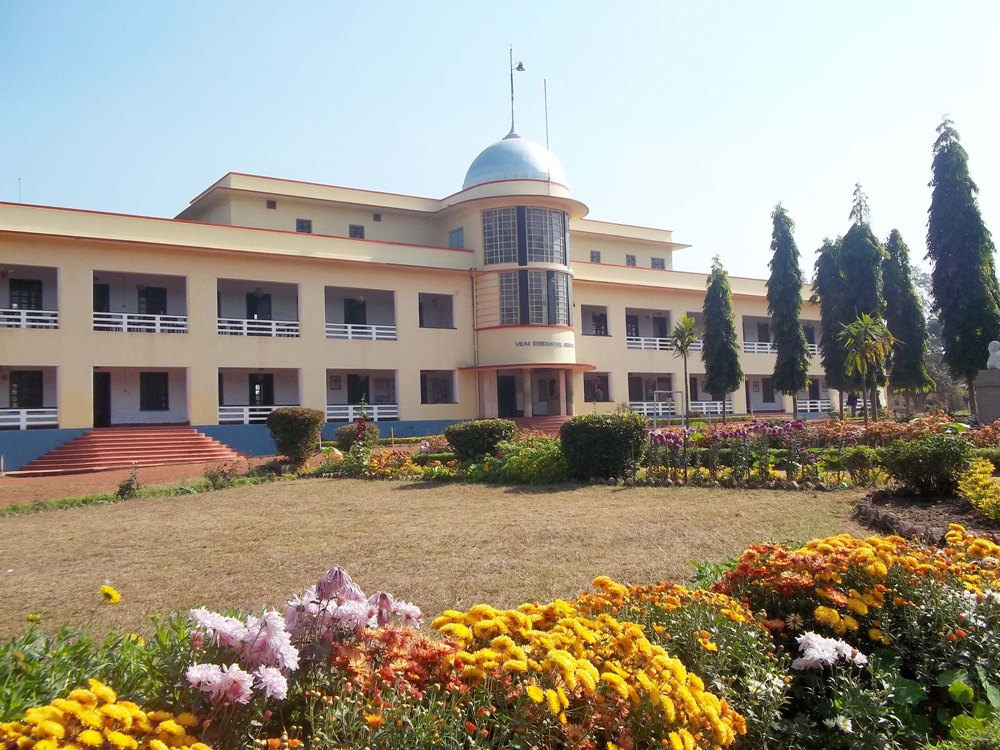

Location
- Ranchi, Jharkhand, 835217; India
- Coordinates: 23.4411409°N 85.4295509°E

Information
- Other names: VVR
- Type: Private
- Motto: तमसोमा ज्योतिर् गमया (From darkness, lead me to light)
- Established: 1952
- Principal: Mr. P.S.Kalra
- Faculty: approx 55
- Gender: Boys & Girls
- Age: 8 to 17
- Enrollment: approx 1200
- Campus: 200 acres (81 ha)
- Colours: Grey and White
- Publication: Vikas Vani Monthly
- Affiliations: Permanently Affiliated to CBSE, Member IPSC, ISO certified
- Website: vikasvidyalayaranchi.com

Vikas Vidyalaya is a co-educational boarding school in Ranchi, Jharkhand, India. Established by Manav Vikas Trust, Kolkata, the school was inaugurated by then president of India Dr. Rajendra Prasad in 1952.

The school is affiliated to the Central Board of Secondary Education New Delhi, for All India Secondary School Examination and All India Senior School Certificate Examinations. It has classes from IV to XII. Admissions to the school are based on an entrance examination and an interview.

The school is governed by its Board of Governors whose Chairman is Mr. Chandra Shekhar Nopany. The current principal of the school is Mr. P.S. Kalra.

Spread over an area of 220 acres (90 ha), the school is situated on the Ranchi–Patna Highway 15 km (9 mi) from the railway station, 35 km (22 mi) from Ramgarh railway station and 20 km (12 mi) from the airport. It is in the outskirts of Ranchi, the capital of Jharkhand.

More than 50 acres (20 ha) are occupied by the school complex consisting of a three-storey academic block, science laboratories, workshops, hobby centres, library and art block, four boarding houses, temple, gymnasium hall/auditorium, swimming pool, rifle shooting range, an open-air theatre, and central dining hall.

== Organization and administration ==
List of members of School Managing Committee with their address/tenure and post held.

- Sri C.S. Nopany- Birla Building, Kolkata – 700 001 - Member
- Sri B.K. Nopany- Sri D.N. Vidyalaya, Kolkata – 700 006 - Member
- Dr. A.S. Raj- Rector, Shri D.N. Vidyalaya, Kolkata - 700 006 . - Member
- Sri C.L. Chamaria- Damodar Ropeways &Construction Co. Pvt. Ltd., Kolkata-700 001 - Member
- Sri S.B. Gadodia- Upper Bazar, Ranchi - Member
- Sri Rajiv Ranjan Mittal- M/s U. Narain & Co., Kolkata - Member
- Sri B.K. Sureka- Birla Sugar Office, Patna-800 001 - Member
- Sri PS Kalra- Principal, Vikas Vidyalaya, Neori Vikas, Ranchi - Hon. Secretary-cum-Member

== Faculty ==
Many renowned faculty members retired in the past five years who had experience of 40+ years of teaching experience and they served all 40 years in Vikas Vidyalaya only. Some of the faculty of our time were Mr. P.K.Roy, Mr. M.K.Mehta, Mr.Shiv Kumar Jha, Mr. U.K.Srivastava, Mrs. Rina Rani, Mrs. J.Khalko, Mr. Avinash Sharan, Mr. Ram (sports teacher), etc. Some of the present faculty mentioned here are:-

- Mrs. Avantika Shaq = HOD, Dept.of English, experience in Vikas vidyalaya is of 20+ years
- Mr. B.N.Pandey = HOD, Dept. of Mathematics, the experience of 32+ years in Vikas Vidyalaya
- Dr. Diwakar Dubey = HOD, Dept. of Hindi & Sanskrit, the experience of 20+ years in Vikas vidyalaya
- Mr. Sunil Kumar Jha = HOD, Dept. of Physics, the experience of 30+ years in Vikas vidyalaya
- Mr. S.K.Satua = HOD, Dept. of Chemistry, experience of 30+ years in Vikas vidyalaya
- Mr. G.Dash = HOD, Dept. of Social Science, the experience of 15+years in Vikas vidyalaya
- Mrs. Bibha Jha = HOD, Dept. of Biology, the experience of 3+ years in Vikas Vidyalaya
- Mrs. Dr S.K.Kejriwal = HOD, Dept. of Economics, the experience of 3+ years in Vikas vidyalaya
- Mrs. Susarla Gouri = Head Librarian

Mrs. Barkha Rani = Department Of Physics

== Boarding houses ==
There are four hostels – Sarojini Naidu (Girl's Hostel), Abhimanyu, Bharat & Shivaji(Boy's Hostels), Each hostel is under the charge of a three Housemaster. There is a Hostel Superintendent in every Hostel who assists the housemasters in looking after the student's line, general cleanliness, etc. Each hostel has prefects and vice-prefects selected from among the students.

== Other facilities ==
- Temple - The temple in the campus is just in front of the academic building and around 100 m from the school's main gate. After school assembly the seniors from class VII to XII visits the temple and the juniors from Class IV to VI visits before the breakfast.
- CDH - There is a CDH (Central Dining Hall) where 600 students take their meal at a time. The Hall is lashed with all type of latest amenities. The campus is pure vegetarian, before 2008 the use of onions and garlic too was banned in the food. The cooks of the hostel are the people who serves the food not less than out home. All the cooks are from Rajasthan and we call them 'maharaj'. They serve us almost all the menus that we wish. The menu of the CDH is changed every week and to talk over the menu our college doctor, principal and prefects of all hostels sit in the meeting.
- Tuck Shop - The tuck shop provide all kind of things that we require for our users from stationary to edibles. Students don't pay cash for the bills rather the bills are adjusted in the fees.
- OAT - The school has OAT(open-air theater) where numerous programs are conducted like the Annual Day, Shivratri, Hostel nights, etc. Especially those events which fall in the months of October, November, February, and March. The rest of the events are conducted in the school auditorium which has the capacity of 1000 seats leaving behind the VIPs seats.
- Orchards - Behind every faculty quarter and Hostel have an orchard. The orchard has plants like guava, mango, litchi, jack fruit, peach, and chikoo.
- Garden - In front of every quarter and hostel, there is a garden to sit and relax. The garden in front of the hostel makes look the hostel very beautiful.
- Fountains - In front of the academic block there are two fountains which make the area look beautiful. The 'champa' tree in the entire Vikas vidyalaya's road makes the school looks very beautiful.
- Shooting Range - The school has a large shooting range where students are taught shooting. All modern equipment are present with the school.
- Horse Stable - The school teaches horse riding and so it has the horse stable in its promises only.

== Sports in Vikas ==
The school has allowed 1.3 hours of game time. Almost all the games are played in Vikas. Also, there are a lot of sports events to keep the students in competitive mood always and inculcate good discipline in society and school. School colors are also issued every year to those students who are exceptional in a particular game or sport. The games are played by groups that are divided. So the entire games are played every day and everybody gets a chance to play the games. Vikas has grounds more than the total intake annually. Teachers and House Masters also play with the students and teach them the necessary skills. The school team goes outside to participate in almost all sports. The students participate in zonal level, IPS, CBe clusters, etc.. Students of Vikas have made the school proud by their great achievements while staying on the campus also, let it be academics or sports. There are only two basketball courts in the school, and both are unmaintained. The school even do not have a playing grounds, only a multi purpose ground for ceremonies, cricket and football. The infrastructure is also not too good

- Football
- Volleyball
- Hockey
- Basketball
- Lawn tennis
- Cricket- Played only during winters but the net practice is done in the morning from 5:30 to 6:30 throughout the year.
- Kho kho
- Handball
- Athletics- This takes place annually in the main ground on the standard tracks that fulfill all the criteria of a running track.
- Rugby- Played during rainy season. The owner of the school comes to witness the final of Rugby every year.
- Boxing- Boxing is also played on the standard ring that is set in the school.

== Vikas Preparatory School ==
There is another unit for tiny tots known as ‘Vikas Preparatory School’ in the school premises where the local children study, the children of the underprivileged family of Ormanji. It is an English Medium School from Nursery to Standard III. The School is run by the female spouse of teachers of Vikas.

== Notable alumni ==
- Shekhar Suman - actor and TV show host.
- Vinay Pathak - actor
- Sushil Rajpal - cinematographer, director, filmmaker

== See also ==
- Education in India
- Literacy in India
- List of schools in India
