= It's Breaking News =

- Directed by: Vishal Inamdar
- Written by: Vishal Inamdar; Jayant Pawar (Dialogue)
- Screenplay by: Sanjay Mone; Jayant Pawar; Saahil Sehgal
- Story by: Sanjay Mone
- Produced by: Smita Shreyas Mhaskar
- Starring: Koel Purie; Swati Sen; Harsh Chhaya; Vinay Apte; Mrunmayee Deshpande
- Music by: Kaushal Inamdar
- Production company: Animaa Films
- Release date: 5 October 2007
- Running time: 115 minutes
- Country: India
- Language: Hindi

It's Breaking News is a 2007 Indian Hindi-language crime film directed by Vishal Inamdar and produced by Smita Shreyas Mhaskar under banner of Animaa Films. It is a story about corrupt police officers, exploitation of an innocent girl and media's fight to expose the facts. A girl seeks help after her father's death from the Higher-ranking officer. He takes advantage of the girl and makes her his kept women. The situation becomes intolerable when the officer starts sending his other police friends to the girl. The girl finally gets help from a news channel to perform a sting operation on him. This is the story of how the news channel used this operation for their own motives and how finally justice was served.

== Plot ==
It is believed that 'Media' is the fourth pillar of democracy. Journalism began as a mission, then a service and now merely a profession – a complete business where a struggle is not to get right news but rather to 'generate' one crammed with glamour and sensation.

The film endeavors to uncover the darker side of the famous or infamous sting operations where a news correspondent (Vidya) falls in the 'chakravyu' of the whole business and finally paves her way out to yet another 'chakravyu'. The film narrates the story of a girl who initially is acknowledged when she is one among the corrupt system and discarded and criticized when she starts rebelling. Vidya is a young, dynamic, self-motivated news correspondent, who has just come out of a journalism course and is all charged to take up confrontations of this profession. But, little did she know that it is not as effortless job as it is perceived. Vidya initially is covering the entertainment beat and is quiet contended with her piece of work. But due to certain shuffles she is forced to quit entertainment and cover crime, which she presumes as not her cup of tea. Gradually, she gets a knack of it and starts getting addicted to the thrill and ecstasy of the job. She gets a brilliant story for her channel all the way from Rajasthan along with her teammates which actually boosts the TRP ratings of the channel and also her morale. In the process, or rather, in the quest for the thrill, she even tries to fool around with the so-called ethics and codes of journalism by creating situations to get a story for her channel.

One day she receives a call, that later changes her overall approach towards this profession. It is a call from a girl, Sangeeta, from Pune, who is a victim of repeated sexual abuses by the high designators of the local Police. Vidya, with her team chalks out a plan for yet another sting and is ready to cover the event where the SP is assaulting Sangeeta. But unfortunately it is the DIG who falls prey to their sting. The whole episode of 'live rape' disconcerts Vidya and her cameraman Rafiq to an extent that they feel ashamed to be merely a spectator in this profession where they couldn't even save the victim. But this event is not less than a celebration to the news channel where this 'Breaking news' will be their USP. Vidya has promised Sangeeta that this footage will not be telecast but rather be kept for her defense in court. Unfortunately, Vidya is traumatized to see the telecast of the whole footage 'as it is' in her news channel irrespective of her caution to the editor. Bugged with the whole system, she leaves for her Uncle's place who had been insisting her to visit his small press. There she apprehends the genuine power and nuance of journalism and gets the spur to fight back the system. With her, is a close friend Bala (a crime correspondent in rival channel), Rafiq (the cameraman) and Trishna (her batch mate in journalism course) who differ in their ideologies and yet are together. This is the time when she gets emotionally attached to the whole ball game and decides to give the victim Justice. In her fight for justice she faces all the ups and downs but all in vain leaving Vidya in utter despair and gloom.

The USP of the film is in exposing reality with certain humorous incidence that occurs within the news channels. From the agitated talk shows to shoving the mike in the mouth of a kissing couple in a park and asking 'what is your take on right to privacy' is being presented in a unique style.

== Cast ==
- Koel Purie as Vidya
- Swati Sen as Sangeeta
- Abhimanyu Singh
- Rahul Vohra as Mr Arora
- Vandana Gupte as Mrs. Dandekar
- Vinay Apte as DIG Dandekar
- Harsh Chhaya as SP Prabhakar Gupta
- Mrunmayee Deshpande as Dandekar's daughter

== Music ==
Music of the film was composed by Kaushal Inamdar
