= Adarsh Baal Vidyalaya =

- Genre: Comedy Drama
- Created by: Biswapati Sarkar; Sameer Saxena
- Written by: Akshay Asthana; Biswapati Sarkar; Nupur Pai; Tatsat Pandey
- Directed by: Himank Gaur
- Starring: Kay Kay Menon; Archana Puran Singh; Naveen Kasturia; Abhimanyu Singh
- Music by: Sunny M. R.
- Country of origin: India
- Original language: Hindi
- No. of seasons: 1
- No. of episodes: 7

Production
- Producers: Sameer Saxena; Saurabh Khanna; Amit Golani; Biswaspati Sarkar
- Cinematography: Shaz Mohammed
- Editor: Harshit Sharma
- Running time: 30–42 minutes
- Production company: Posham Pa Pictures

Original release
- Network: Amazon Prime Video
- Release: 24 July 2026

Adarsh Baal Vidyalaya is a 2026 Hindi-language comedy-drama television series created by Biswapati Sarkar and Sameer Saxena. It stars Kay Kay Menon, Archana Puran Singh, Naveen Kasturia, Abhimanyu Singh, and Prasanna Bisht in key roles.

== Cast ==
- Kay Kay Menon as Headmaster Gyaneswar Tripathy
- Prachi Shah as Sushma, Tripathy's wife
- Archana Puran Singh as Urmila Devi
- Naveen Kasturia as Mukul Dengla
- Abhimanyu Singh as Hansraj Meena
- Deven Bhojani as Goldy Randhawa
- Hussain Dalal as Karan Bindra
- Prasanna Bisht as Kanchan Ma'am
- Ajitesh Gupta as Shiney Saluja
- Annapurna Soni as Sharma Ma'am
- Kabir Sajjid as Gopal
- Akshara Padwal as Palak
- Ashwanth Ashokkumar as Kamal Kanth Kuttan "K3 Ji"
- Vijay Kumar Dogra as Kedia
- Kiran Deep Sharma as Ganga Devi
- Virendra Pundyal as Uppal
- Nagengdra Pratap Singh as Sikhri Sahab
- Yatendra Bahuguna as Ghatora Sir
- Jared Albert Savaille as Bhanu
- Aryan Prajapati as Purav Jha
- Ishaan Kesarwani as Nandlal
- Nabiya Ansari as Purva Jha
- Hanisha Gehlot as Nishtha
- Tishya Kansal as Gunjan
- Harshraj Lucky as Ravinder
- Arav Singh Rajput as Pushkar
- Narigara Jewel as Raghunath
- Abiral Limboo as Naren
- Biswapati Sarkar as Amit Mukhi
- Sameer Saxena as D.E.O.

== Release ==
The series premiered on 24 July 2026 at Amazon Prime Video.

== Critical reception ==
On the review aggregator website Rotten Tomatoes, 60% of 5 critics' reviews are positive, with an average rating of 5/10.

The Indian Express reviewer Shubhra Gupta wrote "it’s even more ironic that for a show which wants to do the right thing – picking up topics which are relevant and timely — it goes about it in such an overstated manner." Rediff.com reviewer Deepa Gahlot awarded 3 stars and wrote "It is an underdog story, which has the pragmatism to understand that there is no magic wand that will bring about overnight change." The Hindu reviewer Shreyas Pande opined "There is an acute disinterest in engaging further, thereby creating the illusion of addressing real issues as the caricatures end up building an alternate meaningless realm."

Outlook reviewer Aishani Biswas called the series as "one of the year's finest Indian series.". Moneycontrol reviewer Abhishek Srivastava stated the series "does not claim to present a completely realistic picture of government schools, nor does it need to." Bollywood Hungama rated the series 3 stars and wrote that the series "works more because of its entertaining characters."

India Today reviewer Sana Farzeen stated that the series "often feels longer than necessary." Scroll.in reviewer Nandini Ramnath says the series is "packed with unhinged, edgy humour." News18 reviewer Titas Chowdhury wrote "There’s no room for nuance here."

The Free Press Journal reviewer Noorulain Sayed felt that the series "ends up becoming more boring and less entertaining." Hindustan Times reviewer Monica Yadav felt that the series "series tries to tackle several social issues at once" and wrote "All of these topics are topical, but the inclusion of too many of them at once make some of them less impactful."

The Hollywood Reporter India reviewer Rahul Desai stated "It’ll be interesting to see if Adarsh Baal Vidyalaya chooses to be in conversation with reality in its next season."

India TV reviewer Twinkle Gupta wrote "It is bolstered by sincere performances and a meaningful premise."

== External link ==
- Adarsh Baal Vidyalaya at IMDb
