= Antardwand =

- Directed by: Sushil Rajpal
- Screenplay by: Amitabh S Verma
- Story by: Sushil Rajpal
- Produced by: Dr Romen Kumar Jha
- Starring: Raj Singh Chaudhary; Swati Sen; Vinay Pathak; Akhilendra Mishra; Himanshi Choudhry
- Cinematography: Malay Ray
- Edited by: Aseem Sinha
- Music by: Bapi Tutul
- Distributed by: PVR Pictures
- Release date: 27 August 2010
- Country: India
- Language: Hindi
- Budget: ₹15 million (US$160,000)

Antardwand (transl. Inner conflict) is a 2010 Indian film co-written, produced, and directed by Sushil Rajpal. The film stars Raj Singh Chaudhary and Swati Sen in the leading roles while Vinay Pathak and Akhilendra Mishra play supporting roles. Made on a budget of ₹15 million (US$160,000), the film is based on the cases of groom kidnapping reported in Bihar in India. The film won the National Film Award for Best Film on social issues at the 2009 National Awards. Its commercial release was on 27 August 2010.

== Plot ==
An aspiring IAS man named Raghuveer (Raj Singh Chaudhary) is in New Delhi studying for his IAS exam. He is living 4 years in Delhi with his girlfriend Sia (Himanshi Choudhry). The film opens showing Sia is talking about her pregnancy to Raghuveer, telling him to reveal their relationship to his father Madhukar Shahi (Vinay Pathak) so Raghuveer can marry his love Sia. He goes to his hometown Bihar, where his parents live. Madhukar is talking about his son's marriage to Mahendra Babu (Akhilendra Mishra) who came to Madhukar's house for his daughter's marriage proposal. Mahendra tries to convince Madhukar to marry his son Raghuveer to his daughter and even offers dowry. But Madhukar calmly rejects his marriage proposal, Raghuveer comes to his house when Madhukar and Mahendra are talking. At night Raghuveer reveals his relationship with Sia to his mother, asking her to help him, but she tell him to talk about his relationship to his father. Raghuveer reveals his relationship to his father who becomes very angry on hearing this but he does not discloses the pregnancy.

His father tells him to forget about Sia and he tells him that he has found a girl for him to marry. That night Raghuveer packs his bag and tells his mother about Sia's pregnancy.

At dawn Raghuveer leaves for Delhi to see his IAS exam results. On the way a van comes beside him and stops, from that van some men abducts Raghuveer. Raghuveer tries to escape but the men knock him unconscious. When he comes to his senses he sees himself locked in a hut. A man gives him some food, Raghuveer asks him why they abducted him and even gives the man money to release him. But the man takes his money and again locks him up. The next day when the man comes to give some food to Raghuveer. Raghuveer hides behind the door and attacks the man and he escapes, the man shouts that Raghuveer has escaped. The men follow Raghuveer and caught him. Raghuveer is tied to the chair and he asks the men that why they have kidnapped him. Suddenly Mahendra comes and tells him it was his plan to abduct him. Raghuveer asks for the cause and the Mahendra tells him that he has abducted him to marry his daughter Janki (Swati Sen). On hearing this Raghuveer becomes extremely angry and yells at them telling to let him go. But Mahendra's men beat him to shut his mouth and say yes to the marriage. Mahendra's wife tells him that it is not right to forcibly make someone marry their daughter as it will be a crime carrying big consequences. But Mahendra shuts her up and tell her that it is good for their daughter and tells his wife to tell Janki that from now onwards Janki will not continue her college and she will marry.

Janki is a fun-loving college student and is unaware of her father's plan. Her mother tells her about it and she becomes very upset about this. That evening her father convinces her to marry saying that it is for her own good and the groom will love her. She says yes for the marriage at the will of her father. In Delhi Sia is worried about Raghuveer for not coming to Delhi since many days. She calls to his father telling him that she is his girlfriend, but Raghuveer's father shouts at her and tells her to forget about Raghuveer and hangs up the phone. His wife reveals to him that Sia is pregnant with Raghuveer's child making him shocked. Raghuveer's IAS exam result comes and his father calls Raghuveer's friend to ask about Raghuveer's whereabouts but his friend tells Madhukar that Raghuveer has not came to Delhi many days. After hearing this Madhukar becomes worried about Raghuveer and lodges a complaint in the police station to find his missing son. At Mahendra's house the preparation of the wedding is going on and Raghuveer is tortured by Mahendra's men to say yes for the marriage. Janki is worried about her marriage but her sister-in-law (Jaya Bhattacharya) convinces her that after the marriage everything will be alright. As the wedding preparations are going, for Raghuveer new suit is stitched and his shave is done and the haldi ceremony takes place for Janki. On the night of the wedding Raghuveer is dressed as a groom and Mahendra's men forcibly make him drink alcohol so he can be unconscious and the wedding will be done, the unconscious Raghuveer and Janki are married. On the night of the wedding Raghuveer still unconscious is on the arm chair and Janki comes in the room and locks the door she sees Raghuveer sleeping and gently puts a pillow under his head and she sits on the bed watching Raghuveer asleep. The next morning Janki goes to cook food for Raghuveer. When Raghuveer regains consciousness, he discovers that he has got married in anger he throws glass of milk on floor. When Janki comes in the room to give tea to Raghuveer she sees that the glass of milk is on the floor. She cleans it and in the aftermoon she brings food for him to eat, but Raghuveer does not eat the food and Janki sits on the bed waiting for him to say something. At that night Janki tries to talk to Raghuveer but he angrily shrugs it off. After sometime Raghuveer is asleep and Janki sleeps beside him, he has a dream of Sia and him sleeping together and he is caressing her shoulder but he caresses Janki's shoulder dreaming she is Sia. Janki feels Raghuveer caressing her shoulder she looks at him and tries to kiss him but he wakes up and angrily sits on the armchair. In the morning Janki tells her sister-in-law about her problem, her sister-in-law tells her to do anything or even beg to save her marriage. Raghuveer escapes from that place and takes a bus and suddenly hear Janki's voice he wakes up revealing it is dream. She offers him a cup of tea but he throws it and tells her to leave him alone when he stands up Janki holds his legs and begs him to please not to hate her Raghuveer tells her not to do this and tells her to stand up she then tells him she also didn't know about this whole situation. Raghuveer tells her that he is in a relationship with his girlfriend Sia and she is pregnant and he doesn't even in what condition Sia is. A policeman comes to Mahendra's house to inform him that Raghuveer's father has lodged a missing complaint of his son and he is a very powerful person. Mahendra tells his wife to tell Janki that to reconcile with Raghuveer. As the days go by Janki starts to fall in love with Raghuveer. But Raghuveer can't get over Sia, Janki tells her sister-in-law to ask permission from her brother to visit the temple with her and Raghuveer. Raghuveer and Janki goes to the temple with the men keeping eye on them. Janki asks Raghuveer about his girlfriend's name, Raghuveer tell her name is Sia in which Janki says that Janki and Sia mean the same. In which Raghuveer responds her that in this situation there is a big difference. When Janki comes to her house she breaks down in front of her sister-in-law and talk about the whole thing her sister-in-law tells everything will be alright and her brother overhears it.

That night Janki's brother and the men forcibly make Raghuveer drunk and provokes him to have sex with Janki. When Janki comes in the room she sees him sitting on the armchair and asks him that if he is okay. In the alcoholic state he tries to have sex with, Janki screams her help but no one hears it. Raghuveer throws her on the bed and have sex with her. In the morning when Janki comes in the house to see herself in the mirror her sister-in-law sees her and the teeth marks on her necks revealing Janki and Raghuveer had sex. When Raghuveer wakes up he sees broken bangles on the bed and remembers he forcibly had sex with Janki. When Janki comes in the room she sees Raghuveer beating his head on the wall and stops him. Raghuveer truly apologizes to her in which she responds to her she is his wife and he doesn't need to say sorry to her. As the days go by Janki is in love with Raghuveer and Raghuveer treats her kindly. After somedays Janki tells Raghuveer to come to have dinner with her family he says that he will come. As the dinner is made, when Janki comes in the room to call Raghuveer she sees he has escaped. Raghuveer goes to Delhi to meet Sia she tells him that she is marrying someone else due to his disappearance and Raghuveer is also married so there is no point being together now and breaks up with him. After sometime Madhukar gets a call from Raghuveer. Raghuveer tells the whole story to his father and his father tells him that to be in Delhi and continue his IAS studies. Back in Bihar, Janki is pregnant and her father tells her to go to Raghuveer's parents house to live with them. They come to Raghuveer parents house to tell them about the marriage and pregnancy. But Madhukar angrily tells Mahendra that if he again come to his house he will use his political power and jail him up and insults Janki that she has got pregnant with someone else's child and not with Raghuveer. After coming home, Mahendra tells his wife to tell Janki that she has to abort the child and to do second marriage, her mother tells him it is not right but he shuts her up and talks to Janki about the abortion and her second marriage. Janki is devastated what has father have done to her. She decides to pack her bags and leave the house and start her new life with her child. As her father talks about what to do next, Janki comes in front of her family with her bags packed. Her father becomes angry at her and asks what is she doing. She confronts him and tells that due his deeds and his so-called "it is for her own good" thing she and Raghuveer have suffered a lot. She tells him that she will not abort her and Raghuveer's unborn child and will start a new life. Her father angrily slaps her she tells him that either kill her or to let her go to have a good future. He doesn't say anything, Janki goes out of the house as her family bids her a tearful goodbye. She puts her belongings in the cycle rickshaw and goes away hoping for a better future with her and Raghuveer's child.

== Cast ==
- Raj Singh Chaudhary – Raghuveer Shahi
- Swati Sen - Janaki
- Himanshi Choudhry - Sia
- Vinay Pathak - Madhukar Shahi
- Akhilendra Mishra - Mahendra

== Production ==
Sushil Rajpal, who graduated from the Film and Television Institute of India (FTII), always wanted to make movies on social issues and highlighting people's agony. Because of his interest in photography, Rajpal specialised in cinematography. He even forayed into the Hindi cinema industry by shooting Pradeep Sarkar's Laaga Chunari Mein Daag. During one of his interviews, he revealed his inspiration for his debut movie:

The movie is based on real life story of one of my close friends who was abducted at Barhariya in Begusarai district of Bihar and was later forced to marry a girl against his wishes.

Groom kidnapping is a practice reported in the Indian state of Bihar. In this practice, eligible bachelors are abducted by a bride's family and forcefully married so that they can avoid paying high dowry to the groom's family. The practice started becoming noticeable towards the late 20th century because the brides' families found it difficult to meet these demands. Organized gangs came forward to carry out these abductions as a solution to their problem.

For this film, he wanted to shoot real-life situations and cast actors who could speak with a local accent. The director's intention was to highlight the result of such forced marriage and the emotional damage that both the girl and the boy suffer from. Most parts of the movie have been shot in Bihar, the region where cases of groom kidnapping have been reported. Rajpal's roots from this region was of good help during the film's production.

The film does not have established actors, because Rajpal wanted people who looked real and could deliver dialogues with a rural appeal. Actor Raj Singh Chaudhary, who earlier featured in Anurag Kashyap's Gulaal, plays the male lead. Until he read the script, Chaudhary thought that he had seen it all. It was only after reading it, he realised that incidents like these happen after all. Swati Sen, an FTII graduate, debuted as an actor by portraying the female protagonist in this film. Vinay Pathak and Akhilendra Mishra were chosen to play the supporting roles. Besides actors Sen and Mishra, nearly 85% of the cast hailed from Bihar.

== Critical reception ==
The film won the National Film Award for Best Film on Social Issues at the 2009 National Awards. It was because of this award, PVR Pictures decided to distribute the film commercially. In a show of support, directors Anurag Kashyap, Imtiaz Ali and Rajkumar Hirani promoted the film's commercial release. Ali saw this film even before it won the National Award. He not only enjoyed watching the film, but also felt happy that it highlighted the issue of groom kidnapping. On the other hand, director Hirani praised Rajpal's directorial debut by saying that the film looked realistic.

In her review, Nikhat Kazmi of The Times of India spoke high about the novelty of the plot and added that director Rajpal has told the story with "authenticity and a touch of high drama that keeps you glued to your seats." While summarising, Kazmi appreciated the performances of the entire cast and said that the film deserved to win the National Award. Taran Adarsh applauded the first-time director for handling a number of sequences with great elan. He not only speaks high about the realism of the plot, but also about the filming locations. Adarsh also held high regards for the performances of the entire cast. On similar lines, the film earned generally good reviews.

Antardwand is one of the films featured in Avijit Ghosh's book, 40 Retakes: Bollywood Classics You May Have Missed. "Few, if any, Hindi movies have been able to project north Bihar as authentically as this movie by director Sushil Rajpal, who hails from eastern Uttar Pradesh...There is no flashiness in Antardwand; just a quiet conviction and unswerving commitment to the narrative. It is more regional and authentic than most Bhojpuri films," writes Ghosh.
