= Gulaal (film) =

- Theatrical release poster
- Directed by: Anurag Kashyap
- Written by: Anurag Kashyap
- Produced by: Jhamu Sughand; Zee Limelight
- Starring: Raj Singh Chaudhary; Kay Kay Menon; Deepak Dobriyal; Mahi Gill; Ayesha Mohan; Jesse Randhawa; Aditya Srivastava; Piyush Mishra; Abhimanyu Singh
- Cinematography: Rajeev Ravi
- Edited by: Aarti Bajaj
- Music by: Songs: Piyush Mishra; Score: Hitesh Sonik
- Distributed by: Zee Limelight
- Release date: 13 March 2009
- Running time: 140 minutes
- Country: India
- Language: Hindi

Gulaal (gulal, Crimson) is a 2009 Indian Hindi-language political drama film written and directed by Anurag Kashyap, starring Raj Singh Chaudhary, Kay Kay Menon, Abhimanyu Singh, Deepak Dobriyal, Ayesha Mohan, Jesse Randhawa, Piyush Mishra and Aditya Srivastava. It explores themes such as pursuit of power, quest for legitimacy, perceived injustices and hypocrisy of the powerful. The film is set in present-day Rajasthan, a state in northwestern India. The plot is provided by student politics of a university and a fictitious secessionist movement consisting of former Rajput leaders who have become present-day elite. Gulaal was initially stalled due to financial concerns but was later released with support from Zee Limelight.

== Plot ==
In the fictional town of Rajpur, Dilip (Raj Singh Chaudhary), a law student who is a Rajput from Bikaner, secures housing in an old, run-down British-era pub. There, Dilip meets Rananjay Singh "Ransa" (Abhimanyu Singh), a prince who despises the ideologies of his father and the aristocracy. Ransa's fiery and fearless personality makes an impression on the mild-mannered Dilip.

Dilip visits the university hostel where he is ragged by a gang of university thugs, led by Jadwal (Pankaj Jha). They strip him and lock him in a room with Anuja (Jesse Randhawa), a young lecturer in the same university. Dilip and Anuja are released naked. Dilip's brother advises him to let it go, but Ransa disagrees and encourages Dilip to seek revenge. Initially reluctant, Dilip gives in and goes with Ransa to attack Jadwal, but the tables are turned and Dilip and Ransa are beaten, ragged, and thrown out of the hostel. Ransa meets Dukey Banna (Kay Kay Menon), a local leader who is gathering support for the Rajputana separatist movement, who promises protection from Jadwal. When Ransa and Dilip find themselves outnumbered by Jadwal's gang, Dukey intervenes and rescues them. Dukey convinces Ransa to contest the General Secretary elections at the university, where his opponent is Kiran, his (out-of-wedlock) half-sister.

Ransa is kidnapped by Kiran's brother Karan (Aditya Srivastava), who asks him to withdraw from the elections. When Ransa refuses and mocks him, Karan kills him. Dukey forces Dilip to take Ransa's place in the election, and bribes the electoral panel to rig the count in Dilip's favour. Dilip wins the election to become the general secretary. Kiran then seduces Dilip and convinces him to allow her to become the cultural secretary. Dukey starts using university funds for the Rajputana movement, which Dilip ostensibly controls. When Dilip discovers the funds being siphoned out, he confronts Dukey, who tells Dilip about the separatist movement. Dilip tries to reason with Dukey but realizes that he holds no leverage in the situation.

Dukey's gang kills Jadwal and Dukey shows the body to Dilip to intimidate him and keep him in line. Anuja is thrown out of the hostel and moves in with Dilip, who is also pursuing a relationship with Kiran. When Kiran accidentally gets pregnant, she gets an abortion and ends her relationship with Dilip. Anuja tries to explain to Dilip that Kiran has no interest in him or in traditional married life. A frustrated Dilip resigns from his post, which allows Kiran to step in and usurp his position. An irate Dukey threatens Karan and Kiran by telling them that the only reason they're alive is because they are the king's offspring. Kiran tries to seduce Dukey, but they are interrupted by Dukey's second-in-command, Bhati.

Dilip, blinded by his love for Kiran, becomes violent and aggressive. He finds out about Kiran and Dukey's relationship from Dukey's mistress Madhuri. In a fit of rage, he goes to Dukey's house and shoots him. While dying, Dukey tells him that Kiran used Dilip to get to him. Karan reveals his masterplan: once Dukey Banna is eliminated, the Rajputana movement will choose him as their leader and legitimize him. Karan's gang decide to eliminate Bhati so that Dukey's defenses will be weakened. Dilip wants to hear the truth from Kiran, but she refuses to answer his calls. When Bhati goes off to find her, he is killed by Karan's gang. Dilip finds Kiran, who confirms that she used him, but he cannot bring himself to kill her. In his indecision, he is shot and mortally wounded by Karan's gang. He manages to drag himself home and dies there, alone. The film ends with Karan as the head of the Rajputana movement, while Kiran sheds a tear as one of the loyal faithful.

== Cast ==
- Raj Singh Chaudhary as Dilip Singh
- Kay Kay Menon as Dukey Banna
- Aditya Srivastava as Karan
- Abhimanyu Singh as Rananjay Singh "Ransa"
- Deepak Dobriyal as Rajendra Bhati
- Mukesh S Bhatt as Bhanwar Singh
- Jesse Randhawa as Anuja
- Pankaj Jha as Jarhwal
- Ayesha Mohan as Kiran
- Mahi Gill as Madhuri
- Piyush Mishra as Prithvi Banna
- Jyoti Dogra as Dukey Banna's wife
- Teddy Maurya as Bahrupiya, Ardhnareshwar
- Sanjay Kumar as Adarsh
- Chittaranjan Giri as Police Inspector
- Murari Kumar as Murari
- Neil Bhatt as Kesar
- Anurag Kashyap as Man at the party

== Production ==
Production on Gulaal began in 2001, when Anurag Kashyap was listening to songs from Pyaasa and his film Paanch was struggling with censors.

Inspired by Mohammad Rafi songs from Pyaasa ("Yeh duniya agar mil bhi jaaye to kya hai") and Zeenat ("Haye re duniya") the film is a dedication to Sahir Ludhianvi, the lyricist of the song and all other poets who had a vision of India. The story was partially based on a story idea by Raj Singh Chaudhary who eventually played the role of Dilip Singh in the film. The film was delayed for three years. It was released in March 2009. The first trailer was released with the director's other movie Dev D.

== Critical reception ==
Gulaal received positive reviews from critics. Anupama Chopra of NDTV gave three stars and referred to Anurag Kashyap as Anti-Yash Chopra. Raja Sen of Rediff.com gave it three stars and said that "fantastically watchable film that scores high on moments." Nikhat Kazmi gave three stars and said that "the film scores in having taut performances and a gritty screenplay as well." Noyon Jyoti Parasara of AOL.in gave the film 3.5 stars and said "Anurag scripts every character cleverly providing an identity to even the smallest characters and also a contrast in form of another character – true playwright style. He even has the jesters coming in to bring some comic relief but also more importantly they bring in a message."

It was screened at the 2009 London Film Festival. Since then, the film has gained significant cult following.

Gulaal is one of the films featured in Avijit Ghosh's book 40 Retakes: Bollywood Classics You May Have Missed.

== Box office ==
Although the critics' reviews were favourable, the movie opened to only 30 percent capacity during its first week in theatres across India. In addition, word of mouth was poor, which could lead to slowdown at the box office for its runs in the weeks that followed. Box Office India stated that Gulaal netted ₹7.8 crore (US$830,000) in its first week, which was below expectations. The opening, at around 30% occupancy, was poor, though marginally better than some other recent films.

== Awards ==
Award	Category	Nominee	Result
Stardust Awards	Best Breakthrough Performance – Male	Abhimanyu Singh	Won
Stardust Awards	Standout Performance by a Music Director	Piyush Mishra	Won
IIFA Awards	Best Supporting Actor	Abhimanyu Singh	Nominated
IIFA Awards	Best Performance in Negative Role	Kay Kay Menon	Nominated

== Soundtrack ==
Gulaal

Soundtrack album by Piyush Mishra
- Released: 13 March 2009
- Genre: Film soundtrack
- Label: T-Series
- Producer: Hitesh Sonik

All lyrics are written by Piyush Mishra; all music is composed by Piyush Mishra.

No.	Title	Performer(s)	Length
1.	"Ranaji"	Rekha Bhardwaj	5:50
2.	"Yaara Maula"	Rahul Ram, Asheem Chakravarty	3:09
3.	"Aarambh"	Piyush Mishra	4:59
4.	"Aisi Sazaa"	Shilpa Rao	4:53
5.	"Sheher"	Swanand Kirkire, Piyush Mishra	7:34
6.	"Beedo"	Rekha Bhardwaj	5:03
7.	"Duniya"	Piyush Mishra	6:49
8.	"Raat Ke Musafir"	Rahul Ram	4:29

== Legacy ==
The character Dukey Banna played by Menon has become an icon in Hindutva circles, being used extensively to glorify the image of the hyper-masculine Hindu male.
