= Groom kidnapping =

Kidnapping men for marriage

Groom kidnapping, colloquially known as Pakaruah shaadi or Jabaria shaadi, is a phenomenon in Bihar, more prominent in Munger and Dumka (now in Jharkhand) wherein unmarried men are abducted by the bride's family and later forcibly married, to get men with better education or wealth. Considering the traditional regard for the marriage sacrament, most such marriages are not annulled. Additionally, the groom may face false criminal charges under Indian dowry law, and end up fighting lengthy legal battles.

The practice became noticeable towards the late 20th century, as dowry costs became prohibitive and organised gangs came forward to carry out the abductions. In 2009, 1224 kidnappings for marriage were reported in Bihar, carried out on behalf of the families of the brides.

== Overview ==
The practice, which is a fallout of the dowry custom, first came to light in the 1980s. It has since gained social sanction among the upper castes like the Bhumihars, particularly in states like Bihar and Uttar Pradesh, where dowry demands are high. Demanding a dowry has been illegal in India for over 50 years, since the passage of the Dowry Prohibition Act of 1961.

In the practice, potential bridegrooms, usually from well-off families, are targeted. Young men who have either cleared their IAS exams, have a medical or engineering degree or have secured a government job, are targeted by families who can’t afford huge dowries. These "grooms" are abducted, held captive and often beaten into submission before being forcibly married, often at gun-point with a rope tied around their waist so they can't run away. Subsequently, if the groom tries to extricate himself from the marriage, he faces lengthy legal battles and even criminal charges under Indian Dowry law, which is geared towards protecting the rights of women in the marriage, as in most cases, the bride's family is financially strong.

According to Arvind, many prosperous Mauritian politicians started to get their daughter married into respectable Bhumihar families, which drove the dowry rates very high and out of reach of common Bhumihars, with the dowry market becoming bullish. This led to groom kidnappings.

Over the years, organised criminals have become part of the practice, as they carry out abductions for a fee and guarantee post-marriage "compliance" by the groom for an extra fee. Thus, many such marriages go unreported and often continue under fear of violence from local criminals.

As early as 1993, the magazine India Today reported such kidnappings by "social groups", one of which had formed in 1982 in Bihar, to kidnap grooms who demanded heavy dowries and forcibly marry them. In some cases, if the groom asks for too large a dowry or backs out of a marriage owing to dowry issues, the girl's family resorts to such measures, having the groom abducted via criminal gangs.

== In popular culture ==
In the ancient Sanskrit play Vina-Vasavadatta, king Pradyota kidnaps Udayana after deciding that he is a suitable groom for his daughter Vasavadatta.

Inspired by the real-life experience of a close friend, director Sushil Rajpal made a film on the issue. Titled Antardwand, it won the 2007 National Film Award for Best Film on Social Issues, and was released in 2010. Groom kidnapping was also the subject of the TV series, Sab Ki Jodi Wohi Banata Bhagyavidhataa (2009) on Colors TV.

Dramas Ghar ek Sapna and Do Qadam Door are based on groom kidnapping and marriage. The practise is also captured in the Indian romantic comedy films, Jabariya Jodi and Atrangi Re.

== See also ==
- Bride kidnapping, historically more common than groom kidnapping practices
- New York divorce coercion gang
