= Giri Raj Singh Sirohi =

Indian plant physiologist

Dr. G.S. Sirohi

Giri Raj Singh Sirohi was an Indian plant physiologist who was the first Indian to set foot on the south pole of Antarctica.

== Career ==
He carried out research in Antarctica in 1960 for around 100 days. The objective of the experiments was to collect data on the Biological Clock at the South Pole, since it represented a place where the rotational activity of the Earth could be negated. The plant material (soybeans, etc.) and animal material (hamsters, etc.) were studied at the South Pole. Project work took almost 12 months, out of which 4 months were spent at the South Pole in Antarctica.

He worked as Head & Professor of Plant Physiology Division, Indian Agricultural Research Institute, Delhi, India.

He also co-authored a reference book on plant-physiology.

== Honours ==
Sirohi received the lifetime award from the Indian Society for Plant Physiology in 2003.

To honour his breakthrough contribution to the Science of Plant Physiology, the Government of United States named a place in Antarctica after him as Sirohi Point in 1961.
