= Swati Sen =

Indian film actress

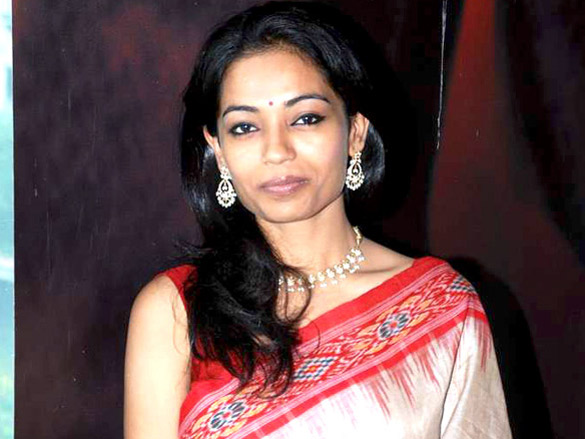
Swati Sen at Antardwand premiere

Swati Sen is an Indian actress born in Nagpur, Maharashtra, most known for her roles in Udedh Bun, which won the Silver Bear for Best Short Film at the 2008 Berlin International Film Festival, and the National Film Award-winning Antardwand (2010), which won her critical acclaim as well as Best Actress MAMI.

== Early life and education ==
Swati studied acting at the Film and Television Institute of India (FTII), Pune. She got bit by the acting bug at Miranda House College, Delhi, where she was an active member of the Dramatics Club and performed many street plays, full-length plays, stage shows etc.

== Career ==
She was offered Antardwand when she happened to meet Shruti, the casting director for the film. Shruti then asked Swati to meet Sushil Rajpal, the Director of the film. Rajpal was suitably impressed with her and she was cast and appeared in the movie Antardwand.

Swati Sen had entered the Indian film industry and already won the 'Best Actress Award' for her film, Sushil Rajpal's Antardwand, which has won the National award (Best Film) and MAMI award (Best Actress). Looking at her performance, Anurag Kashyap and Imtiaz Ali have gone to the extent of calling her amongst the actresses around. She is already being compared to Smita Patil, Chitrangada and Tabu.

She was featured in the international music video "calling all crows" by Andrew Mudge for American Radio. She has also been a part of regional films like Sontha Vooru (Telugu). She has played the protagonist Suchorita in the televised version of Rabindranath Tagore's most celebrated Novel "Gora"

She considers Mr. Tripurarai Sharan, Ex-Director FTII as her Guide and Mentor.

Currently she is associated with the Virat Kalodbhav Theater Group, Mumbai.

Married into the prestigious family of Dr. Rajendra Prasad (1st Indian President), Swati and her husband Devaditya Prasad (writer-director, associated with Sudheer Mishra), currently residing in Andheri West, Mumbai.

== Filmography ==
- 2007: It's Breaking News - Sangeeta
- 2007: Woh Subah Kidhar Nikal Gayi
- 2008: Udedh Bun (short) - Beloved
- 2009: Andheri (short) - Anita - the maid
- 2009: Sonta vooru (Telugu)
- 2010: Antardwand - Janki
- 2012: Gora (Hindi) - Sucharita
