= Kay Kay Menon =

Indian actor (Born October 1966)

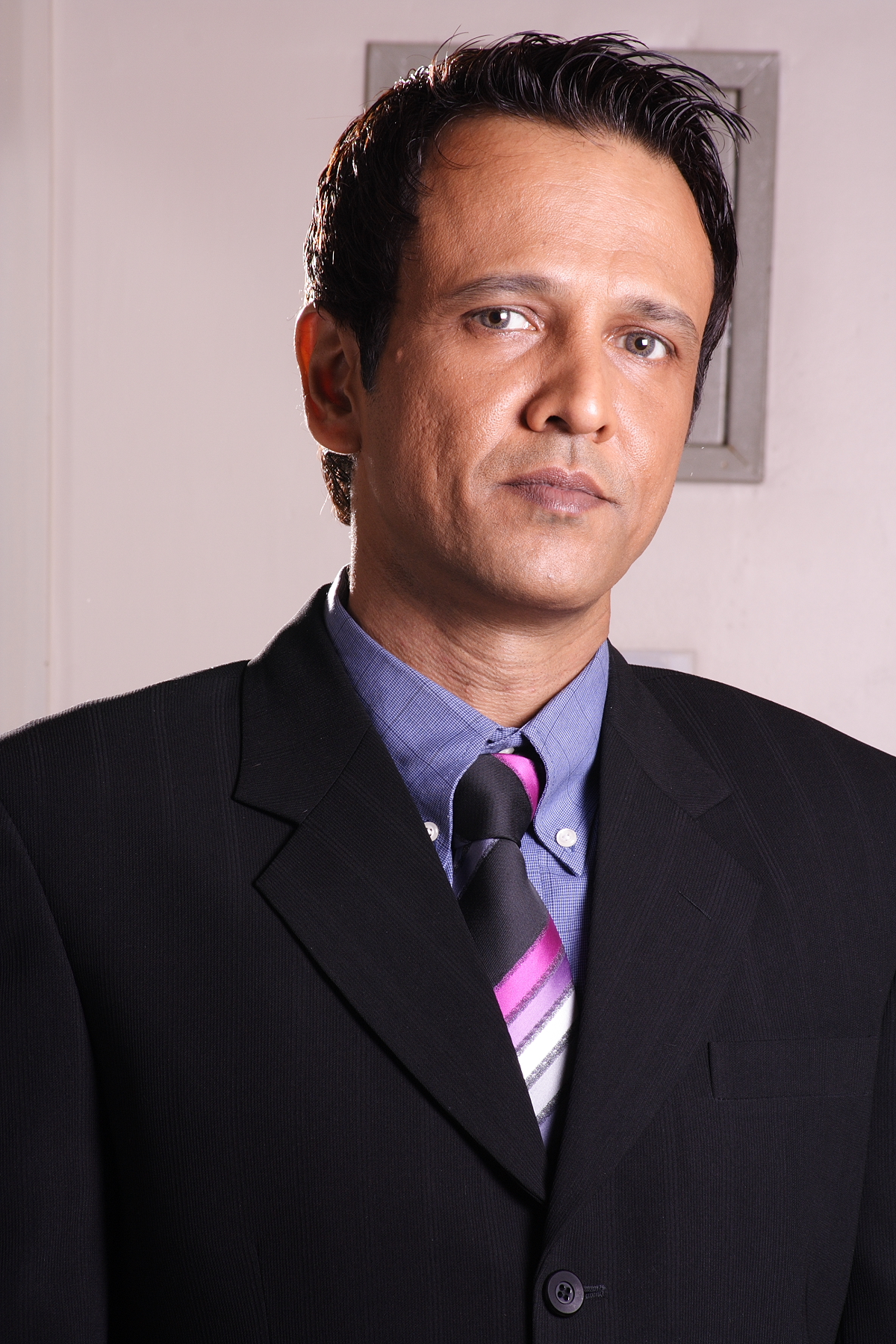
- Menon in 2012
- Born: Krishna Kumar Menon; 2 October 1966 (age 60); Kozhikode, Kerala, India
- Education: University of Pune
- Occupation: Actor
- Years active: 1995–present
- Spouse: Nivedita Bhattacharya (m. 2002)

Krishna Kumar Menon (born 2 October 1966), known professionally as Kay Kay Menon, is an Indian actor who works predominantly in Hindi cinema, and occasionally in Gujarati, Tamil, Marathi and Telugu films. He is best known for his roles in films such as Black Friday (2004), Deewar (2004), Sarkar (2005), Shaurya (2008), Gulaal (2009), Haider (2014), Baby (2015), The Ghazi Attack (2017). He has starred in web series such as Special Ops, Farzi, The Railway Men and Citadel: Honey Bunny. He is regarded as one of the most influential actors in cinema of India.

== Early life ==
Menon was born into a Malayali family in Kozhikode, Kerala and raised in Ambarnath and Pune, Maharashtra, India. He studied at the St. Joseph High School in Khadki, Pune. He passed his 10th grade in 1981. He did his Bachelors (Physics) from Mumbai University and his MBA from Department of Management Sciences (PUMBA) at the University of Pune, graduating in 1988 with a major in Marketing. Menon's initial focus was working in the advertising industry, including Kinetic Honda and Marlboro cigarette advertisements in India.

== Career ==
He started his career in theatre productions where he met Nivedita Bhattacharya, whom he married. His first theatre break was opposite Naseeruddin Shah in Feroz Abbas Khan's Mahatma vs Gandhi.

In the early years of his career, Menon worked on television, with roles in the TV movies Zebra 2 and Last Train To Mahakali. He also appeared in Telefilms of Zee TV Rishtey (Ward no. 6) and Saturday Suspense episodes. He was praised for his role as a young Prime Minister in the Zee TV series Pradhan Mantri (2001), directed by Ketan Mehta. In The Hindu, Sevanti Ninan wrote, "an actor to watch: Kay Kay Menon ... this unusually tall actor who plays the pradhan mantri is a major saving grace" while in The Tribune, Amita Malik commented, "excellent acting by Menon, who skilfully conveys the physical as well as mental image of the honest politician".

Menon made his big screen debut with a small role in Naseem (1995), followed in 1999 by the lead role in Bhopal Express, a movie that went mostly unnoticed. This was the first in a series of initial setbacks in Menon's film career. In the early 2000s, he starred as a wicked rock musician in Anurag Kashyap's debut movie, Paanch, which struggled with censorship and has remained unreleased. Two other movies, Hazaaron Khwaishein Aisi and Black Friday, had to wait many years for a release date. Meanwhile, his commercial films Deewar (starring Amitabh Bachchan) and Silsiilay (with Shahrukh Khan) flopped at the box office. It was only in 2005, with the eventual release of the critically acclaimed Hazaaron Khwaishein Aisi, but with Ram Gopal Varma's Sarkar, Menon had his break. Sarkar earned him a nomination for the Best Performance in a Negative Role at the Filmfare Awards. In The Tribune, Saibal Chatterjee called him "one of Bollywood's finest actors".

In 2007, he acted in Life in a... Metro as an adulterous husband. In 2008, he appeared in Shaurya, which was based on A Few Good Men. His portrayal of a ruthless army brigadier is still talked of among cinema lovers. In 2009, he starred in The Stoneman Murders where he played a police officer on the hunt for the Stoneman serial killer. He played the role of Dukki Bana in Gulaal.

His role as Khurram Mir in 2014's Haider bagged him a Filmfare and IIFA award for Best Supporting Actor. He played a very crucial role in The Ghazi Attack as a Naval Captain based on an Indian Naval submarine, S21, intercepts a Pakistani submarine, PNS Ghazi, during routine surveillance and thwarts its mission of destroying INS Vikrant in 1971. He played a role as Vikram Singh in 2019's Penalty with co-actor Mohit Nain.

In 2018, Menon made his Marathi film debut in Ek Sangaychay - Unsaid Harmony, directed by Lokesh Gupte. To prepare for his role, Menon took Marathi lessons for speaking, though he could understand by hearing.

He gained further popularity with his role as Himmat Singh in Special Ops (2020), a Hotstar web series. In 2021, he played the younger version of Himmat Singh in Special Ops 1.5, the prequel to Special Ops.

== Personal life ==
Menon married his longtime girlfriend Nivedita Bhattacharya in 2002.

== Filmography ==
=== Films ===
Year	Title	Role	Notes
1995	Naseem	Islamic fundamentalist	
1999	Bhopal Express	Verma	
2002	Chhal	Karan Menon	
2003	Hazaaron Khwaishein Aisi	Siddharth Tyabji	
2004	Black Friday	DCP Rakesh Maria	
2004	Deewaar	Sohail Miyaan	
2004	Silsiilay	Anwar Ahmed Bhoy	
2005	Sarkar	Vishnu Nagare	
2005	Dansh	Mathew	
2005	Main, Meri Patni Aur Woh	Akash	
2005	Ek Khiladi Ek Haseena	Kaif	
2006	Corporate	Ritesh Sahani	
2006	Shoonya	Mahendra Naik	
2007	Strangers	Sanjeev Rai	
2007	Honeymoon Travels Pvt. Ltd.	Partho Sen	
2007	Life in a... Metro	Ranjit Kapoor	
2007	Go	Nagesh Rao	
2008	Sarkar Raj	Vishnu Nagare	
2008	Maan Gaye Mughal-e-Azam	Haldi Hasan	
2008	Mumbai Meri Jaan	Suresh	
2008	Via Darjeeling	Ankur Sharma	
2008	Shaurya	Brigadier Rudra Pratap Singh	
2008	Sirf	Gaurav	
2008	Drona	Riz Razaida	
2009	The Stoneman Murders	Sanjay Shelar	
2009	Gulaal	Dukey Banna	
2009	Aage se right	Janubhai/Baima Rashidul Kairi	
2009	Sankat City	Guru	
2010	Tera Kya Hoga Johnny	Inspector Shashikant Chiple	
2010	Lafangey Parindey	Anna	Cameo
2010	Benny And Babloo	Benny	
2011	Bheja Fry 2	Ajit Talwar	
2011	Bhindi Bazaar	Shroff	
2012	Chaalis Chouraasi	Albert Pinto	
2012	Life Ki Toh Lag Gayi	Salman	
2012	Shahid	War saab	
2013	Enemmy	CID Officer Naeem Shaikh	
2013	ABCD: Any Body Can Dance	Jehangir Khan	
2013	Udhayam NH4	ACP Manoj Menon IPS	Tamil film
2013	Ankur Arora Murder Case	Dr. Viren Asthana	
2014	Raja Natwarlal	Vardha Yadav	
2014	Haider	Khurram Meer	
2015	Baby	Bilal Khan	
2015	Rahasya	CBI Officer Sunil Paraskar	
2015	Bombay Velvet	Investigative Officer Vishwas Kulkarni	
2015	Singh Is Bliing	Mark	
2016	A Flying Jatt	Mr. Rakesh Malhotra	
2016	Saat Uchakkey	Tejpal	
2016	The Tiger Hunter	Azeem Malik, Sami's father	
2017	The Ghazi Attack	Captain Ranvijay Singh	Bilingual film
2018	Dhaad	Ghelo	Gujarati film
2018	Vodka Diaries	ACP Ashwini Dixit	
2018	Baa Baaa Black Sheep	ACP Shivraj Naik	
2018	Phamous	Kadak Singh	
2018	Ek Sangaychay	ACP Malhar Raorane	Marathi film
2019	Penalty	Vikram Singh	
2021	Shaadisthan	Tiger Ji / Rajaji	
2023	Love All	Siddharth Sharma	
2025	Champion	Qasim Razvi	Telugu film
2026	Dial 1975	Govind	

=== Television ===
Year	Show	Episodes	Role
1995-1996	Darr		Inspector Avinash
1999	Star Bestsellers - Zebra 2		Captain Rajeev
1999	Star Bestsellers - Last Train to Mahakali		Sir
1997-99	Saturday Suspense	"Woh Kaun Thi?", "The Assassin", "On the Run", "Breaking News", "Friends", "Beyond Truth"	Inspector Vaali James Mathew Aakash (Serial Killer) Amar Rathore Krishna Pandit COP Ankush
2000	Rishtey	"Ward No. 6"	Doctor Rajat
2001	Pradhan Mantri		PM Anirudh Prakash
2004	CID	"World Record One Signal Cut 111 Minute"	
2005	Time Bomb 9/11		Prime Minister of India
2010	F.I.R.		Benny
2014	Yudh		Municipal Commissioner

=== Streaming series ===
Year	Title	Role	Platform	Notes
2018	The Great Indian Dysfunctional Family	Vikram Ranaut	ALTBalaji	
2020	Special OPS	Himmat Singh	Disney Plus Hotstar	
2021	Ray	Inderashish	Netflix	
2021	Special Ops 1.5: The Himmat Story	Himmat Singh	Disney Plus Hotstar	
2023	Farzi	Mansoor Dalal	Amazon Prime Video	
2023	Bambai Meri Jaan	Ismail Kadri	Amazon Prime Video	
2023	The Railway Men	Iftekaar Siddiqui	Netflix	
2024	Shekhar Home	Shekhar Home	Disney Plus Hotstar	
2024	Murshid	Murshid Pathan	ZEE5	
2024	Citadel: Honey Bunny	Guru	Amazon Prime Video	
2026	Adarsh Baal Vidyalaya	Gyaneswar Tripathy	Amazon Prime Video	

=== Short films ===
Year	Title
2019	Sparsh
2019	The Last Chapter
