= Raj Singh Chaudhary =

Indian director, actor and screenwriter

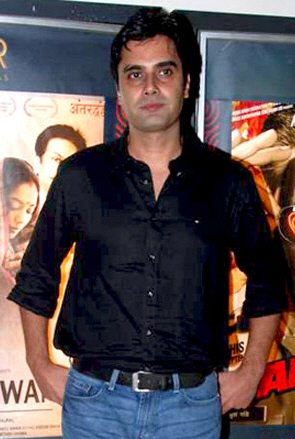
- Chaudhary in 2010
- Born: Raj Singh Chaudhary; 13 July 1975 (age 51); Darjeeling, West Bengal, India
- Education: B.M.S. College of Engineering, B.M.S. Institute of Technology and Management
- Occupations: Actor; screenwriter; film director
- Years active: 2003–present

Raj Singh Chaudhary is an Indian actor, screenwriter and film director.

== Early life and career ==
Chaudhary was born in Darjeeling, India. After pursuing a career in modelling and earning his degree in software engineering from BMS College of Engineering, he opened his own software company in Bangalore. When Chaudhary was defrauded by his business partners, he took an opportunity to move to Mumbai to pursue a new career in acting. Chaudhary was inspired to write his own script after seeing the film Satya with its script written by Anurag Kashyap. Drawing on experiences from his college days, he worked on his script which focused on the practice of ragging, the physical and mental abuse of students in educational institutions. After the film in which he was supposed to appear fell through, Chaudhary took his script to director Kashyap who became his mentor. Kashyap wrote a new screenplay based on Chaudhary's original script for what would eventually become the film Gulaal. Chaudhary played the lead character and earned praise. In addition to his work on Gulaal, Chaudhary also assisted on the set of Black Friday while playing a primary character and wrote the short story on which No Smoking is based. He next appeared in Sushil Rajpal's film Antardwand which won the 2007 National Film Award for Best Film on Social Issues and was released in 2010.

== Filmography ==
Year	Title	Functioned as		Notes
Year	Title	Director	Writer	Notes
2007	No Smoking	No	Yes	
2009	Gulaal	No	Yes	
2019	The Last Chapter	Yes	Yes	Short film
2021	Shaadisthan	Yes	Yes	Hotstar film
2022	Thar	Yes	Yes	Netflix film

=== Acting credits ===
Year	Title	Role	Notes
2003	Kuch Naa Kaho	Ajay Sehgal	
2004	Black Friday	Mushtaq Tarani	
2009	Gulaal	Dileep Singh	
2010	Ek Anhonee	Josheph "Tiger" Rodriguez	
2010	The Waiting Room	Karan	
2010	Antardwand	Raghuveer	
2018	Plus Minus	Jeet	Short film
