= Rajasimha =

Rajasimha may refer to:

== People ==
- Maravarman Rajasimha I (reigned c. 710–765), Pandyan king in what is now India
- Maravarman Rajasimha II (reigned c. 900–915), Pandyan king

== Other uses ==
- Rajasimha (film), a 2018 Indian Kannada-language action film

== See also ==
- Rajasinha I (1532–1593), king of Sitawaka in what is now Sri Lanka
- Rajasinha II of Kandy (c. 1608–1687), king of Kandy in what is now Sri Lanka
- Raja Simham, a 1995 Indian film
- Raj Sinha, Indian politician
- Raj Singh (disambiguation), an alternative form of the name
