= Anurag Kashyap filmography =

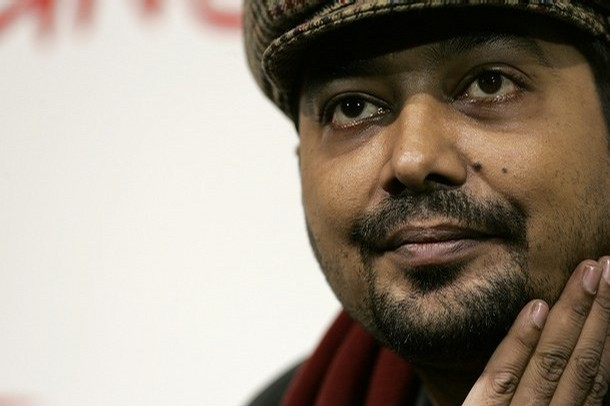
Kashyap attending the Rome Film Festival in 2007.

Anurag Kashyap is an Indian filmmaker and actor, known for his work in Hindi cinema. After writing a television series Kabhie Kabhie (1997), Kashyap co-wrote Ram Gopal Varma's crime drama Satya (1998). He later wrote and directed a short television film, Last Train to Mahakali (1999), and made his feature film debut with the yet-unreleased film Paanch. He next directed Black Friday (2007), a film on the 1993 Bombay bombings. Its release was barred by India's Censor Board for two years, but was eventually released in 2007 to positive reviews. The same year, he directed the critical and commercial failure No Smoking. Return of Hanuman (2007), an animated film, was Kashyap's next directorial venture. In 2009, he directed Dev.D, a modern-day take on Sarat Chandra Chattopadhyay's Bengali novel Devdas, along with the political drama Gulaal. Despite positive reviews, the latter was a box-office failure.

Kashyap's production company Anurag Kashyap Films released its first film Udaan (2010)—a critical success that earned him the Filmfare Award for Best Story and Best Screenplay. He then directed one of the short films in the anthology film Mumbai Cutting. After directing the thriller That Girl in Yellow Boots (2011), the two-part crime film Gangs of Wasseypur (2012) was his next release, which garnered him the Filmfare Award for Best Dialogue. In 2013, he directed a short film on eve teasing titled That Day After Everyday, and directed one segment of the anthology film Bombay Talkies (2013). In 2013, he co-produced The Lunchbox, a film that was nominated for the BAFTA Award for Best Film Not in the English Language, and the biographical drama Shahid. In 2011, Kashyap started another production company Phantom Films, whose first feature was the period drama Lootera (2013).

Kashyap co-produced and co-edited the comedy-drama Queen (2014), which earned him the Filmfare Award for Best Editing; the film also won the National Film Award for Best Feature Film in Hindi. His next directorial ventures were the thriller Ugly (2014) and the period film Bombay Velvet (2015). The latter opened to mixed reviews from critics and failed to recover its ₹1.2 billion (US$12 million) investment. In 2015, he co-produced two commercially successful films, Hunterrr, NH10 and the critically acclaimed Masaan. Kashyap went on to direct Raman Raghav 2.0 (2016), based on the serial killer Raman Raghav, the sports drama Mukkabaaz (2018) and co-directed India's first Netflix Original series, the crime thriller Sacred Games. In 2019, he co-founded another production company, Good Bad Films, whose first film was Choked (2020).

== As a director, producer, and writer ==
=== Feature films ===
Key
†	Denotes films that have not yet been released

Year	Title	Director	Producer	Screenwriter	Notes	Ref.
1997	...Jayate			Yes	Unreleased	
1998	Satya			Yes	Along with Saurabh Shukla	
1999	Shool			Dialogues		
1999	Kaun			Yes		
2000	Jung			Yes		
2001	Nayak			Dialogues		
2003	Paanch	Yes		Yes	Unreleased, theatrical and home-video	
2004	Paisa Vasool			Yes		
2004	Yuva			Dialogues		
2004	Black Friday	Yes		Yes		
2005	Water			Dialogues		
2005	Main Aisa Hi Hoon			Dialogues		
2006	Mixed Doubles			Dialogues		
2006	Shoonya			Yes		
2007	No Smoking	Yes		Yes		
2007	Honeymoon Travels Pvt. Ltd.			Dialogues		
2007	Dhan Dhana Dhan Goal			Dialogues		
2007	Return of Hanuman	Yes		Yes		
2007	Fool & Final			Dialogues		
2007	Shakalaka Boom Boom			Dialogues		
2008	Aamir		Yes		Creative producer	
2008	Mumbai Cutting	Yes		Yes	Directed the segment "Pramod Bhai 23"	
2009	Kurbaan			Dialogues		
2009	Dev.D	Yes		Yes	Nominated—Filmfare Award for Best Director	
2009	Gulaal	Yes		Yes	Nominated—Filmfare Award for Best Story	
2010	Udaan		Yes	Yes	Filmfare Award for Best Story (Note: Shared the award with Vikramaditya Motwane.); Filmfare Award for Best Screenplay; Nominated—Filmfare Award for Best Film	
2010	Muskurake Dekh Zara			Yes		
2011	That Girl in Yellow Boots	Yes	Yes	Yes		
2011	Michael		Yes			
2011	Shaitan		Yes			
2011	Trishna		Co-producer			
2012	Gangs of Wasseypur – Part 1	Yes	Yes	Yes	Filmfare Award for Best Dialogue (Note: Shared the award with Zeishan Quadri, Akhilesh Jaiswal, and Sachin K Ladia.); Nominated—Filmfare Award for Best Film; Nominated—Filmfare Award for Best Director	
2012	Gangs of Wasseypur – Part 2	Yes	Yes	Yes		
2012	Aiyyaa		Yes			
2012	Chittagong		Yes			
2012	Luv Shuv Tey Chicken Khurana		Yes			
2012	Talaash: The Answer Lies Within			Additional dialogues		
2012	The Last Act		Yes	Yes	Anthology film	
2012	Tasher Desh		Yes			
2012	Shahid		Yes			
2012	Peddlers		Yes			
2013	The Lunchbox		Yes		Critics Week Viewers Choice Award (Cannes Film Festival); Nominated—BAFTA Award for Best Film Not in the English Language	
2013	Monsoon Shootout		Yes			
2013	Bombay Talkies	Yes		Yes	Directed the segment "Murabba"	
2013	Lootera		Yes	Dialogues		
2013	Shorts		Yes			
2014	Hasee Toh Phasee		Yes	Dialogues		
2014	Queen		Yes		Filmfare Award for Best Editing (Note: Shared the award with Abhijit Kokate.); National Film Award for Best Feature Film in Hindi	
2014	Tigers		Yes			
2014	Ugly	Yes	Yes	Yes	Nominated—Filmfare Award for Best Director	
2015	NH10		Yes			
2015	Hunterrr		Yes			
2015	Bombay Velvet	Yes	Yes	Yes		
2015	Masaan		Yes		FIPRESCI Award (Cannes Film Festival); Promising Future award (Cannes Film Festival)	
2015	Meeruthiya Gangster				Co-editor	
2015	Vakratunda Mahakaaya		Yes		Marathi film	
2015	Shaandaar		Yes			
2016	Udta Punjab		Yes			
2016	Raman Raghav 2.0	Yes	Yes	Yes		
2016	Madly	Yes	Yes	Yes	Directed the segment "Clean Shaven"	
2016	Wrong Side Raju		Yes		Gujarati film	
2017	Haraamkhor		Yes			
2017	Trapped		Yes			
2018	Mukkabaaz	Yes	Yes	Yes		
2018	Bhavesh Joshi Superhero		Yes	Yes		
2018	Lust Stories	Yes		Yes		
2018	Manmarziyaan	Yes	Yes			
2019	Moothon		Yes	Hindi dialogues	Malayalam film	
2019	Cargo		Yes			
2019	Saand Ki Aankh		Yes			
2020	Ghost Stories	Yes			Directed Segment 2 (unnamed)	
2020	Choked	Yes	Yes			
2020	AK vs AK		Executive producer	Dialogues		
2021	Paka (River of Blood)		Yes		Producer; Malayalam film	
2022	Thar			Dialogues		
2022	Dobaaraa	Yes	Yes			
2022	Two Sisters and a Husband		Yes			
2023	Almost Pyaar with DJ Mohabbat	Yes		Yes		
2023	Kennedy	Yes		Yes		
2025	Nishaanchi	Yes		Yes		
2025	Bad Girl		Yes			
2025	Nishaanchi Part 2	Yes		Yes		
2026	Bandar	Yes		Yes		
2026	Vaghachipani †		Yes		Kannada film	

== As an actor ==
Year	Title	Role(s)	Language	Notes	Ref.
2000	Gang	Police Officer	Hindi		
2004	Black Friday	ISI agent at landing boat	Hindi	Also director; cameo appearance	
2007	No Smoking	Man in the elevator	Hindi		
2009	Luck by Chance	Himself	Hindi	Cameo appearance	
2009	Dev.D	Chanda's customer	Hindi	Also director; cameo appearance	
2009	Gulaal	Man at the party	Hindi	Also director; cameo appearance	
2010	I Am	Vinay	Hindi		
2011	Soundtrack	Himself	Hindi	Cameo appearance	
2011	Shagird	Bunty Bhaiya	Hindi		
2011	Tera Kya Hoga Johnny	Kashyap	Hindi	Cameo appearance	
2011	Trishna	Himself	Hindi	Also co-producer	
2014	Bhoothnath Returns	Himself	Hindi	Cameo appearance	
2014	Happy New Year	Selection Judge of World Dance Championship Auditions	Hindi	Cameo appearance	
2016	Akira	ACP Govind Rane	Hindi		
2018	Daas Dev	Vishambhar Pratap Chauhan	Hindi	Guest appearance	
2018	Imaikkaa Nodigal	ACP Martin Roy (Rudhra)	Tamil		
2019	Bombay Rose	Raja Khan (voice)	Hindi		
2020	Ghoomketu	Inspector Badlani Jr., Raja Badlani, and Sr. Badlani (Note: Anurag Kashyap performances in a triple role films.)	Hindi	Triple role; also producer	
2020	AK vs AK	Himself	Hindi	Also executive producer and dialogue writer	
2021	Bansuri: The Flute	Sadashiv	Hindi		
2023	Kuttey	Politician	Hindi	Cameo appearance	
2023	Haddi	Pramod Ahlawat	Hindi	ZEE5 movie	
2023	Leo	Daniel	Tamil	Cameo appearance	
2024	Maharaja	Selvam	Tamil		
2024	Bad Cop	Kazbe	Hindi	TV series on Disney+Hotstar	
2024	Viduthalai Part 2	Naxal Radical	Tamil		
2024	Rifle Club	Dayanand Bare	Malayalam		
2025	Saali Mohabbat	Gajendra Bhaiya	Hindi	ZEE5 film	
2026	Dacoit: A Love Story	CI Rambabu alias Swamy	Telugu; Hindi	Bilingual film	
TBA	One 2 One †	TBA	Tamil	Filming	

== Short films ==
Year	Title	Director	Producer	Screenwriter	Actor	Ref.
1999	Last Train to Mahakali	Yes	Yes	Yes		
2010	Tubelight ka Chaand		Yes			
2010	The Joy of Giving		Yes			
2010	Encounter			Yes	Yes	
2013	Moi Marjaani		Yes			
2013	Geek Out		Yes			
2013	The Epiphany		Yes			
2013	Chai		Yes			
2013	Hidden Cricket		Yes			
2013	That Day After Everyday	Yes	Yes			
2014	Kali-Katha	Yes	Yes	Yes		
2017	Chhuri				Yes	
2018	Beautiful World		Yes			
2018	Bebaak		Yes			
2019	Fool for Love				Yes	
2020	Yaad		Yes			
2022	Clean			Yes		
2023	Chaar Chappalein	Yes				
2026	Incognito		Yes			
2026	Chaar Diwaari		Yes			

== Documentary films ==
Year	Title	Role	Ref.
2012	The World Before Her	Presenter	
2014	Katiyabaaz	Presenter	
2016	India In A Day	Executive producer	
2017	Raghu Rai: An Unframed Portrait	Producer	
2022	Lords of Lockdown	Producer	

== Television ==
Year	Title	Role	Notes	Ref.
1997	Kabhie Kabhie	Writer		
2014	Traffic: An MTV EXIT Special	Anchor, Producer		
2014	Yudh	Creative director		
2018	Ghoul	Producer		
2018–2019	Sacred Games	Director, co-producer		
2019	Thriller Factory	Director, voice actor	Audio series	
