= Star Bestsellers =

- Country of origin: India
- Original language: Hindi
- No. of seasons: 1
- No. of episodes: 38

Production
- Camera setup: Multi-camera

Original release
- Network: StarPlus
- Release: 17 July 1999

Star Bestsellers is an Indian anthology television series which aired on StarPlus from 17 July 1999 to 23 July 2000.

== Plot ==
Each episode of the series has a different story, director, and cast.

== Episode list ==
No.	Title	Directed by	Written by
1	"Neeti (The Frog and the Scorpion)"	Hansal Mehta	TBA
2	"Shuruat"	Rajit Kapoor	Loveleen Mishra
3	"Prayas"	Rajit Kapoor, Deep Dudani	TBA
4	"First Kill"	Sriram Raghavan	TBA
5	"Aakhir Kya Hota Hai Pyar"	TBA	TBA
6	"Kabaad"	Usha Dixit	TBA
7	"Zebra 2"	Umesh Padalkar	TBA
8	"Kagaz Ka Rishta"	Rajesh Ranshinge	TBA
9	"Fat Chance"	Parvathi Balagopalan	TBA
10	"Gulmohar"	Niranjan Thaday	Brijmohan
11	"Vikrut"	TBA	TBA
12	"Fursat Mein aka Dayanand Phir Bola"	Tigamnshu Dhulia	Tigamnshu Dhulia
13	"Telephone"	Shabnam Sukhdev	Shabnam Sukhdev
14	"Last Train to Mahakali"	Anurag Kashyap	TBA
15	"Govind Aur Ganesh"	Indranil Goswami	TBA
16	"Arth"	Sanjay Upadhaya	Sanjay Upadhaya
17	"Aneko Hitler"	Tigmanshu Dhulia	TBA
18	"C.Z.H.E.K"	TBA	TBA
19	"Dead End"	TBA	TBA
20	"Abhay"	TBA	TBA
21	"Ek Shaam Ki Mulaquat 3"	Tigmanshu Dhulia	Based on Gujarati short story by Chandrakant Bakshi
22	"Anand"	TBA	TBA
23	"The End"	TBA	TBA
24	"Singh Parivar @ Jalandhar.Com"	Maya Arora	TBA
25	"Chaudwin Ka Chand"	Gaurab Pandey	Gaurab Pandey
26	"Bhoron Ne Khilaya Phool"	Tigmanshu Dhulia	TBA
27	"The Ring"	Promod Pradhan	TBA
28	"Masoom"	Glen Barretto, Ankush Mohla	TBA
29	"Dil Se"	TBA	TBA
30	"Love On The Net"	Vinta Nanda	TBA
31	"Ooncha Kaun"	TBA	TBA
32	"Ehsaas"	TBA	TBA
33	"Yeh Dil na Hota Bechara"	Sameer Dandekar	Sameer Dandekar
34	"Kya Yahi Pyaar Hai"	Tanuja Chaturvedi	TBA
35	"Witness"	Imtiaz Ali	TBA
36	"Tripti"	Rajit Kapur	TBA
37	"Sharma v/s State Case No. 1329"	Maya Rao	TBA
38	"Bank Balance"	TBA	TBA

== Reception ==
Devarshi Ghosh of Scroll found the episodes of varying quality and called it "a portal into the stories, sensibilities and aesthetics that our best filmmakers were occupied with at the turn of the millennium."
