= Alok Pandey =

Film actor

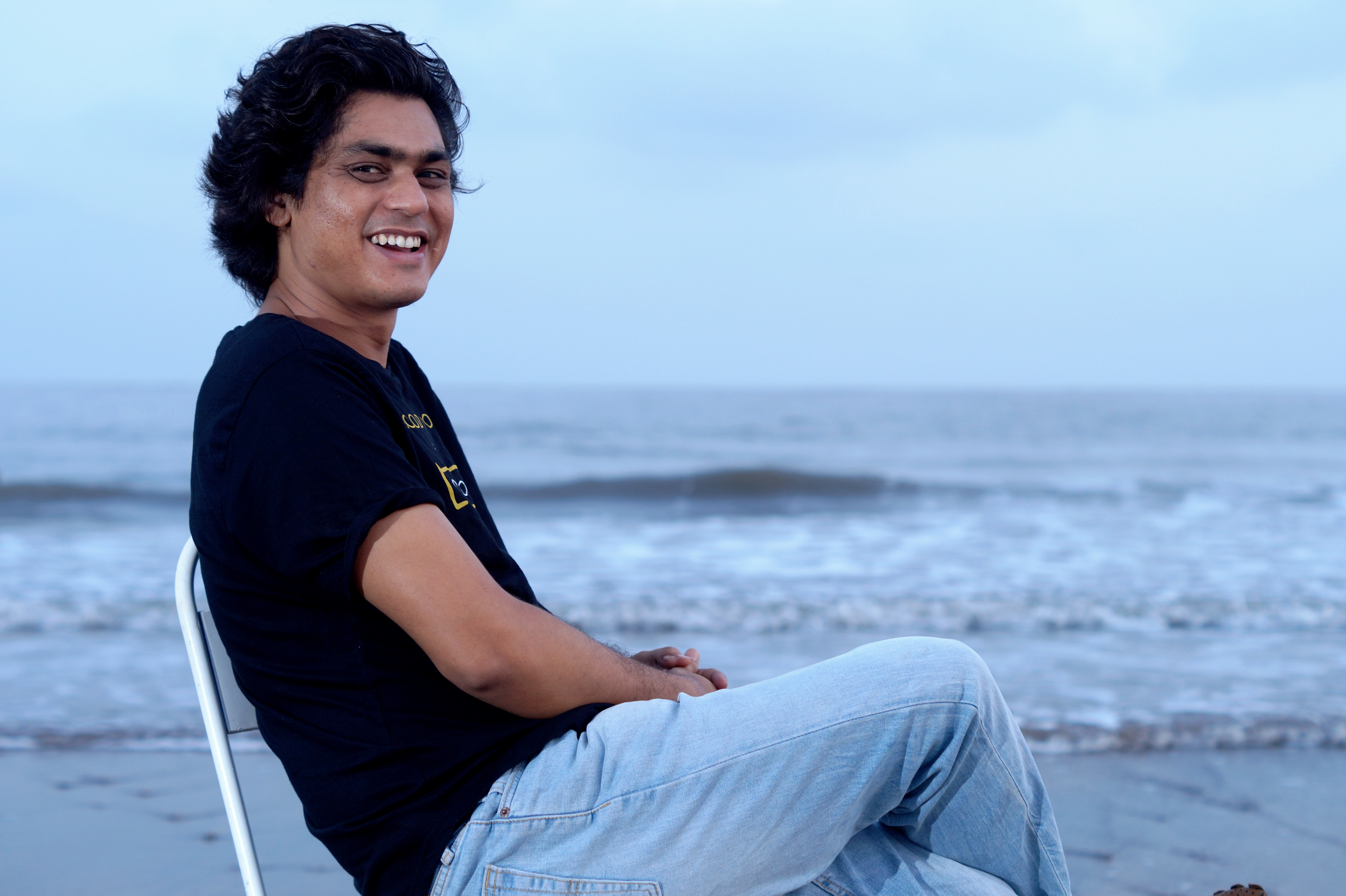
- Pandey in 2018
- Born: 30 April 1988 (age 38); Shahjahanpur, Uttar Pradesh, India
- Education: Bhartendu Academy of Dramatic Arts
- Occupation: Actor
- Years active: 2007–present
- Known for: M.S. Dhoni: The Untold Story (2016); Lucknow Central (2017); Batla House (2019); Sanam Teri Kasam (2016)
- Spouse: Aarti Pandey
- Parents: Shivram Pandey (father); Rajkanti Pandey (mother)

Alok Pandey (born 30 April 1989) is an Indian actor and model who is best known for playing MS Dhoni's best friend in the former Indian Cricket Team captain's biopic M.S. Dhoni: The Untold Story", a negative role with John Abraham in Batla House and a major role in Lucknow Central. He performed packed role in a short film entitled "KKKK…KIRAN". He has also played roles in films like PK, Prem Ratan Dhan Payo, Sanam Teri Kasam, Special Ops, One Day: Justice Delivered, etc.

== Early life ==
Pandey was born in a village named Dadoun, Shahjahanpur. During his college days, he went to watch a theater play. While watching this play, the idea of becoming an actor came into his mind.

== Career ==
Pandey joined the "Sanskriti Theater Group" in 2007. He learned acting tricks from his mentor Alok Saxena in this theater group. Later, he joined the "Bhartendu Natya Akademi" (BNA) (new name is "Bharatendu Academy of Dramatic Arts") in Gomti Nagar. He is a 2011 batch pass-out, got opened the BM Shah auditorium where he staged his first professional theater play. He performed several shows in Lucknow BNA. After that he got selected in Satyajit Ray Film and Television Institute in Kolkata. Here, he learned a lot from fellow actor Vipin Sharma. After a year, in December 2012, finally he came to Mumbai. Theater friend Manoj Sharma was already in Mumbai, so he sheltered Pandey. .He got a good role with Ravi Khemu's serial Hamarey Gaon Koi Ayega in the lead role of Gulam Nabi, in 2013which he was making for Doordarshan. Meanwhile, Pandey get a chance to do work with Anurag Kashyap's short film That Day After Everyday, opposite Radhika Apte. Then he got to work in Salman Khan's Prem Ratan Dhan Payo that assigned with Rajshri Productions directed by Sooraj Barjatya. During this film, casting director Vicky Sidana came in contact and because of that, Pandey later got to work in films like M. S. Dhoni: The Untold Story, Lucknow Central. He become famous after doing Bambai Meri Jaan

== Filmography ==
Film/Series title	Role	Year
Bindiya Ke Bahubali S1(web series)	Babbal Banna	2025 8August
Pakdam Pakdi (web series)	Awdesh Pandey	2025, Coming soon
The Pshychiatrist	Ethen Dsouza	2025, Coming soon
Haseen Dilruba 2	Chiraunji Lal	2024
The Rapist Film	Hemant	Cooming soon
Aazam	Vishal	2023
Bambai Meri Jaan (web series)	Rahim (with Kay Kay Menon)	2023
Sehar	Vishal Kaul	NA
Hurdang	Gopal Singh	2022
Special Ops (web series)	Pappu Haramzada	2020
Batla House	Tufail Khan	2019
Kkk... Kiran (short film)	Psycho Killer	2019
Hum Chaar	Vikram Singh	2019
One Day: Justice Delivered	Afzal Ahmed	2019
Lucknow Central	Bunty (Farhan Akhtar's friend)	2017
M. S. Dhoni: The Untold Story	Chittu	2016
Sanam Teri Kasam	Watchman	2015
Prem Ratan Dhan Payo	Montu	2015
PK	TV Reporter (special appearance)	2014
Samvidhaan (TV serial)	Journalist	2014
That Day After Everyday	Goon	2014
