= Mumbai Fables =

2010 book by Gyan Prakash

- Author: Gyan Prakash
- Publication date: 2010
- ISBN: 9780691142845

Mumbai Fables is a 2010 non-fiction book about the history of Mumbai, authored by Gyan Prakash. Bombay Velvet (2015), directed by Anurag Kashyap, is based on this book.
