= Gyan Prakash =

Indian historian

Academic work
- Discipline: History
- Institutions: Princeton University

Gyan Prakash is a historian of modern India and the Dayton-Stockton Professor of History at Princeton University. Prakash is a member of the Subaltern Studies collective. Prakash received his Bachelor of Arts degree in history from the University of Delhi in 1973, his Master's degree in history from Jawaharlal Nehru University in 1975, and his doctorate in history from the University of Pennsylvania in 1984. His field of research concerns urban modernity, genealogies of modernity, and problems of postcolonial thought and politics. He writes about modern South Asian history, comparative colonialism and postcolonial theory, urban history, global history, and the history of science. He has also written several books, including Mumbai Fables (2010), which was adapted into the 2015 film Bombay Velvet directed by Anurag Kashyap.

== Works ==
- Bonded Histories: Genealogies of Labor Servitude in Colonial India (1990)
- Another Reason: Science and the Imagination of Modern India (1999), ISBN 9780691004532
- Worlds Together: Worlds Apart: A History of the Modern World, 1300 to the Present (2002)
- Mumbai Fables (2010), ISBN 9789350291665
- Emergency Chronicles: Indira Gandhi and Democracy's Turning Point (2019), ISBN 0691186723
- (ed.) After Colonialism: Imperial Histories and Postcolonial Displacements (1995)
- (ed.) The Spaces of the Modern City: Imaginaries, Politics, and Everyday Life (2008)
- (ed.) Noir Urbanism: Dystopic Images of the Modern City (2010)

== See also ==
- Science and technology studies in India
