= Last Train to Mahakali =

- Written by: Anurag Kashyap
- Directed by: Anurag Kashyap
- Starring: Kay Kay Menon; Nivedita Bhattacharya; Vijay Maurya; Lovleen Mishra; Shrivallabh Vyas
- Music by: Shaarang Dev
- Country of origin: India
- Original language: Hindi

Production
- Producer: Manish Tiwari
- Cinematography: Natty Subramaniam
- Editor: Aarti Bajaj
- Running time: 45 min.
- Budget: INR 400,000

Original release
- Network: StarPlus
- Release: 1999

Last Train to Mahakali is a 1999 Indian Hindi-language thriller film written and directed by Anurag Kashyap, produced by Manish Tiwari and Saket Bahl. It was made for the Star Plus television series Star Bestsellers and was first telecast in 1999. The film won the Special Jury Award at the 8th Annual Star Screen Awards. In 2005, it was one of the four short films screened at an event organized by Films Anonymous at Hyderabad.

The film tells the story of a doctor on death row who claims to have discovered a permanent cure for any virus-based disease. It stars Kay Kay Menon and Nivedita Bhattacharya.

== Production ==
Anurag Kashyap got an opportunity to direct Last Train to Mahakali in a moment of disenchantment. Producer duo Manish Tiwari and Saket Bahl were looking to produce quality content with potential talents in different capacities. Anurag Kashyap who showed both the potential and desire to debut as a director, discussed a few stories with the producers. After a lot of deliberation, the story of 'Last Train to Mahakali ' was finalized among them. Manish Tiwari, Saket Bahl and Anurag Kashyap narrated the script to Star Plus. The channel liked the script but they were skeptical about the final product and they said that they would give their final decision only after the film is completed. Despite the risk involved in this process, the producers Manish Tiwari and Saket Bahl went ahead with the production by having a strong conviction on the script and Anurag Kashyap's abilities as a director. This film had not only introduced the talented and successful director Anurag Kashyap but also successfully introduced few more distinctive talents to the hindi film industry such as Cinematographer Natarajan "Natty" Subramaniam and Production Designer Wasiq Khan. Star Plus saw the final product and happily agreed to screen it on the channel as a part of the series – Star Bestsellers – which showcased the work of young and upcoming producers, writers and directors.

Kashyap contacted cinematographer Natarajan (Natty); he had liked Natty's work in the music videos of the band Euphoria. Producers flew Natty from Delhi to shoot the film and gathered the entire passionate and creative crew to match up with the vision of Anurag Kashyap and the conviction of Manish Tiwari - Saket Bahl. They shot the entire film in over four days. The shooting inside a train was done using a DV camera that Kashyap borrowed from a friend who was working as a producer at MTV, after promising him a role in the film.

== Home media ==
This movie is available in JioHotstar as part of Star Bestsellers episode.

== Reception ==
The film was aired on Star Plus and was well received by the audience; the shooting style, more than the story, was appreciated. It won the Special Jury Award at the 8th Annual Star Screen Awards.
