= Love Sex Aur Dhokha =

2010 Indian anthology drama film by Dibakar Banerjee

- Theatrical release poster
- Directed by: Dibakar Banerjee
- Written by: Dibakar Banerjee; Kanu Behl
- Produced by: Ekta Kapoor; Shobha Kapoor; Priya Sreedharan
- Starring: Anshuman Jha; Nushrat Bharucha; Rajkummar Rao; Neha Chauhan; Amit Sial; Herry Tangri; Ashish Sharma
- Cinematography: Nikos Andritsakis
- Edited by: Namrata Rao
- Music by: Sneha Khanwalkar
- Production company: Freshwater Films
- Distributed by: ALT Entertainment; Balaji Motion Pictures
- Release date: 19 March 2010
- Running time: 112 minutes
- Country: India
- Language: Hindi
- Budget: ₹2 crore
- Box office: est. ₹9.8 crore

Love Sex Aur Dhokha (transl. Love, Sex and Betrayal), also known by the initialism LSD, is a 2010 Indian Hindi-language anthology found footage drama film directed and written by Dibakar Banerjee, and co-written by Kanu Behl. Jointly produced by Ekta Kapoor, Shobha Kapoor, and Priya Sreedharan under the banner of ALT Entertainment, the film stars mostly newcomers including Anshuman Jha, Nushrat Bharucha, Rajkummar Rao, Neha Chauhan, Amit Sial, Herry Tangri and Ashish Sharma. The first instalment of a duology. It has three separate but interlinked stories about an honour killing, an MMS scandal, and sting operations.

Banerjee conceived the film after he came across several video clips containing sexual content including the DPS MMS clip and wanted to explore what led to that situation. He then wrote two short stories, which he later expanded into three. The film was made entirely using digital formats with different cameras, including a handycam, an amateur film camera, a security camera, an underwater camera, and spy cameras. Nikos Andritsakis served as the film's cinematographer and Namrata Rao was its editor. The film's soundtrack was composed by Sneha Khanwalkar and the lyrics were written by Banerjee.

Love Sex Aur Dhokla was screened at the 2010 London Indian Film Festival and the Munich International Film Festival. It was released in India on 19 March 2010 to positive reviews from critics. The film was made on a budget of ₹20 million (US$210,000); it grossed ₹97.8 million (US$1.0 million) and proved to be a commercial success. Rao and Pritam Das won the Best Editing and the Best Sound Design Award, respectively, at the 56th Filmfare Awards. Khanwalkar received the R. D. Burman Music Award.

A spiritual sequel titled: Love Sex Aur Dhokha 2 was released in 2024.

== Plot ==
=== Love (Titled Superhit Pyaar) ===
Rahul, an amateur film director in his early 20s, decides to make a low-budget film for his diploma course. During auditions, he casts Shruti, a young woman from an orthodox family headed by a wealthy real estate magnate. As they grow close, Shruti's overprotective brother overhears one of their telephone conversations and storms the film set in search of Rahul. Shruti reveals that her father intends to marry her to someone else, prompting the couple to elope and marry. From their honeymoon suite, they telephone her family seeking acceptance. Although initially furious, Shruti's father and brother appear to reconcile and offer to send a car to collect them. Instead, her brother and his goons ambush the couple, murder them, dismember their bodies with an axe, and bury the remains.

=== Sex (Titled Paap ki Dukkaan) ===
Shruti's friend Rashmi is a reserved woman who works night shifts at a supermarket to support her family. Her supervisor, Adarsh, secured his position through family connections but is heavily indebted to loan sharks. He conspires with a friend to make a sex tape involving an employee and sell it to the media, choosing Rashmi despite developing genuine feelings for her. Although he briefly considers abandoning the scheme, greed prevails. After Rashmi learns of Rahul and Shruti's brutal deaths, Adarsh exploits her grief, has sex with her, and secretly records it using the supermarket's security cameras. Selling the footage enables him to repay his debts. It is later revealed that Rashmi loses her job and is ostracised by her family.

=== Dhoka (Titled Badnaam Shohorat) ===
Investigative reporter Prabhat seeks a sensational story to earn a bonus from his employer. After saving aspiring dancer Naina from a suicide attempt, he helps her expose Loki Local, a music producer and singer who demanded sexual favours in exchange for casting her as the lead dancer in his next music video. The media encourage a second sting in which Naina will appear to blackmail Loki, hoping to catch him attempting to bribe her and strengthen the original evidence. During the operation at the supermarket where Rashmi works, Loki discovers the plan, attempts to seize the camera, and shoots Prabhat, leaving him hospitalised. Naina later brings him the footage, but Prabhat chooses to protect her dignity rather than pursue his bonus, refusing to hand the recording to his employers and resigning. It is then revealed that Naina has betrayed him by accepting the lead role in Loki's new music video.

== Cast ==
- Anshuman Jha as Rahul
- Nushrat Bharucha as Shruti
- Sandeep Bose as Shruti's Dad
- Rajkummar Rao as Adarsh
- Neha Chauhan as Rashmi
- Arya Banerjee as Naina
- Herry Tangri as Loki Local
- Amit Sial as Prabhat
- Atul Mongia as Atul
- Ashish Sharma as Shahid
- Taran Bajaj as Goldie
- Aditi Singh Pohankar as Aditi

== Production ==
=== Development ===
I realised when we see an MMS we actively do not want to engage with the characters. We don't know what had happened before or after the sex tape. That's when I thought-suppose a camera catches both, what if you start building back the context to the relationship? What if the same camera saw them coming together, holding hands etc. Out of that came the idea of shooting with just the security camera, yet tell a very involved tale.

— Banerjee, on the film

Director Dibakar Banerjee said several real-life sex scandals, including the DPS MMS scandal, inspired him to make Love Sex Aur Dhokla because he "wanted to do something on what led to that incident". He co-wrote two short stories with Kanu Behl, which they later expanded into three. According to Banerjee, he found some sex tapes "hilarious" because "those people, while having sex were also struggling with the camera, the ergonomics of how to shoot while having sex". He wrote a two-page story about a man who is in love and "the contrast between what he thinks love should be and what it actually is". The film consisted of three stories dealt with issues of honour killings, sexual exploitation and voyeurism. The second story is based on diploma film footage that Banerjee had retrieved. He said the three stories were connected; "the way we played with time, and cause and effect and the fundamental rule that every story has a beginning, a middle and an end".

Banerjee approached Ekta Kapoor after they finished writing the script; he said Kapoor "readily agreed" to produce it. In 2010, Kapoor launched ALT Entertainment and decided to release Love Sex Aur Dhokla under her banner. The film was jointly produced by Balaji Motion Pictures's ALT Entertainment and Priya Sreedharan. In June 2009, it was announced that Banerjee would make an experimental film about the impact of digital technology for Kapoor's company. Banerjee said, "Earlier, we would have sex because we wanted to have sex. Today, we have sex to get caught on a tape, to further their career or to make friends. That is the issue that the film is examining." Banerjee stated that he wanted to examine "voyeurism", which "the whole society finds itself trapped in", through the film. Banerjee was inspired by the Tehelka sting operations for the third story of his film, which is about a sting operation on a pop star. According to him, several clichéd dialogues of Hindi cinema were used in the film to show a "mirror" because the "trajectory is very similar to a typical Bollywood film and yet very different".

=== Casting ===
Banerjee and his team decided to cast newcomers and unknown professional actors. The cast consisted of actors including Neha Chauhan, Rajkummar Rao, Anshuman Jha, Nushrat Bharucha, Amit Sial and Aaditi Pohankar. The casting director of the film was Atul Mongia, who also acted in it. Neha Chauhan was cast after Banerjee saw her in her brother's wedding video; Chauhan wanted to assist Banerjee but he chose her for the role of Rashmi. Mongia auditioned 15 people a day for three and a half months to cast the 75 characters in the film. He screened almost 2,000 actors and auditioned 1,000 of them; some actors were chosen from the street. Sandeep Bose, who runs a casting agency, sent actors for auditions and was eventually cast in the role of Shruti's father in the first story. The three actors who were shortlisted for lead characters underwent through a two-month workshop in Prithvi Theatre. They were asked to act out random situations and improvise scenes. Arya Banerjee, daughter of sitar player Nikhil Banerjee, was cast in the role of model Naina. Herry Tangri was cast in the role of pop star Loki local. Rajkummar Rao, an alumnus of Film and Television Institute of India, was cast as Adarsh; to resemble his character's physique he had to lose six kilograms (13 lb) in a month. The film was edited by Namrata Rao, who also acted in a small role.

=== Filming ===
Love Sex Aur Dhokla is the first Indian film to be shot in the digital format. It was made using guerrilla film-making techniques in locations in Mumbai by the director of photography Nikos Andritsakis. It was filmed with different cameras, including a handycam, an amateur film camera, night-vision cameras, a security camera, an underwater camera and a spy camera. The stories are told from the camera's point of view; Banerjee said, "It is almost as if the camera is a character and to do that you have to give the camera character". The film was made with different kinds of camera. Banerjee said he chose to work digitally to get the aesthetics that he could not get on 35 mm film. An item song titled "I Can't Hold It" was purposely filmed poorly because in the film, the song is being shot by an amateur film director who makes mistakes.

Banerjee said many takes were required for the five-second shot in which a woman jumps into the sea because "the camera jumped along with her, filming her movements". Andritsakis wanted to give the film a "video look" that has a "harsh" picture quality with everything in the frame in focus. Banerjee wanted the film to look "shaky, low-tech, fuzzy and unframed", and yet make it entertaining. He showed 1 Night in Paris to Andritsakis for reference. The underwater sequences set in a canal were filmed separately in a swimming pool with special gears for the camera. The suicide scene was filmed using a stunt double and the camera free-flowing in air; the actors performed their parts of the scene separately using chroma key.

== Soundtrack ==
The film's soundtrack album was composed by Sneha Khanwalkar and the lyrics were written by Dibakar Banerjee. The album rights were acquired by Sony Music and the soundtrack album was released on 26 February 2010. Vocals were performed by Khanwalkar, Kailash Kher, Nihira Joshi, Amey Date and Nagarjuna.

== Release ==
A 90-second trailer was to be released along with 3 Idiots in theatres across India; it was edited three times so it could be shown in 290 multiplex screens. The film was promoted with the tagline, "You're being watched". A promotional video of the film's title song was launched prior to the release. It was screened at the 2010 London Indian Film Festival and the Munich International Film festival. The Central Board of Film Certification shortened and blurred a love scene showing a bare-backed woman on top of a man. Banerjee showed his disappointment and said: "Those who saw the complete sex scene with the naked body were traumatised. There was nothing sexual about it". A reference to caste in the love story between a low-caste man and a high-caste woman was also changed; Banerjee stated his disappointment, saying, "This completely changes the perspective of my story since now the caste-challenged love story is turned into a poor-boy-rich-girl romance". The lyrics of the track "Tu Nangi Achi Lagti Hai" were changed to "Tu Gandi Achi Lagti Hai" in the film. Love Sex Aur Dhokla received an "A (adult only)" certificate after the changes. Kapoor was in a "state of shock" after seeing the final cut of the film because the shaky camerawork and the stories affected her deeply.

Before the film's release, Banerjee screened the first 20 minutes of it in the SIES Nerul college and discussed it with the students. The film was released in 350 screens in India. It was only released in India because the producers felt the recovery of costs for small-budget films is not possible overseas. After the film's release, the producers decided to release it in selected screens in the US, UK, UAE and some other international markets. A photograph showing the bare backs of two actors from the film was released before the film; some media outlets labelled it "the most shocking scene to be ever filmed in a commercial Hindi film". Banerjee reacted to this and said, "I want the scene to be judged as part of the film. To use the picture out of context will be damaging to the film." The film is also available on Netflix.

== Reception ==
=== Critical reception ===
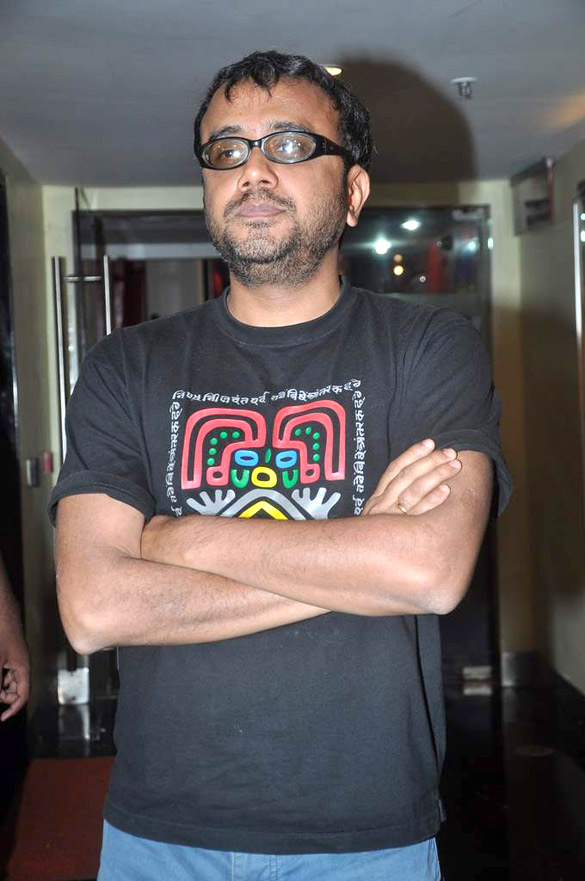
Banerjee's direction was praised by critics

Love Sex Aur Dhokla opened to mostly positive responses from critics. Rajeev Masand gave it 4 out of 5, stating it as "the most riveting Hindi film in recent memory" and called it "possibly the most important Hindi film since Satya and Dil Chahta Hai." Raja Sen called the film a "masterpiece", writing, "Bollywood has just grown up the only way it could, with Love, Sex and Dhokla." Sarita Tanwar of Mid-Day called it "season's best film" and a "must-watch". A review carried by The Indian Express called the film "path-breaking" which "signifies the changing face of Hindi cinema". Anupama Chopra called the film "a grim, deeply unsettling and yet compelling portrait of urban India" and a "polarizing film".

Sanjukta Sharma of Mint gave a positive review and said, "LSD is raw and courageous; it is not pretty, but it has beauty ...". A review in The Times of India gave three-and-a-half to the film and stated, "Don't expect time-pass entertainment. Think beyond run-of-the-mill and see how Ekta Kapoor re-invents herself as the producer of contemporary Indian cinema's first full-blown experimental film". Mayank Shekhar stated, "Where any Bollywood movie without a gyrating, lip-synching hero perceives itself as 'different', this one ... is truly an experiment". Namrata Joshi called the film "remarkable" for the way it creates an "audacious narrative".

Baradwaj Rangan wrote, "Love Sex Aur Dhokla is nothing if not off-the-charts ambitious—and yet, I couldn't shake off the feeling that Banerjee has pulled off a successful experiment rather than a satisfying experience". Aniruddha Guha of Daily News and Analysis said the writing of the film was "inconsistent" and called it "bold but not so beautiful". Subhash K. Jha said. "the director vision is so unified to the way the characters see themselves that a section of the audience may feel it's watching a hugely self-indulgent work that wants to keep the 'cinema' out of cinema". Ajit Duara of OPEN compared the film's title and filming techniques with Steven Soderbergh's Sex, Lies, and Videotape and felt unlike Soderbergh's film, Banerjee's film doesnot show his point of view.

The film was mentioned in critic and author Shubhra Gupta's book, 50 Films That Changed Bollywood, 1995–2015.

=== Box office ===
Love Sex Aur Dhokla was made on a production budget of ₹20 million (US$210,000). It grossed ₹42.5 million (US$450,000) in its opening weekend and ₹64.0 million (US$680,000) at the end of its first week. It opened well at multiplexes in metro cities, in Delhi and North India. The film grossed ₹97.8 million (US$1.0 million) by the end of its theatrical run, making it a profitable venture.

=== Awards ===
Namrata Rao and Pritam Das won the Best Editing and the Best Sound Design Award awards respectively at the 56th Filmfare Awards. Sneha Khanwalkar received the R. D. Burman Music Award. The film received the Best Film Award, while Banerjee received the Best Director Award at the 2011 Stardust Awards in the searchlight category.

== Sequel ==
Love Sex Aur Dhoka 2 (LSD 2) a sequel by Banerjee with a tagline of "Love in the Times of the Internet" was released in 2024. The sequel was a box office bomb.

Initially planned as a single film, Love Sex Aur Dhokla duology was eventually split into two parts.

== See also ==
- Found footage (pseudo-documentary)
- Anthology film
