= One Day: Justice Delivered =

2019 Indian film directed by Ashok Nanda

- Theatrical release poster
- Directed by: Ashok Nanda
- Written by: Alaukik Rahi
- Produced by: Kamlesh Singh Kushwaha; Ketan Patel; Swati Singh
- Starring: Anupam Kher; Esha Gupta; Kumud Mishra; Nasir Khan; Anusmriti Sarkar; Parikshit Sahni
- Cinematography: Indrajit Bancel; Arvind Singh
- Edited by: Umashankar Mishra
- Music by: Songs: Vikrant-Parijat; Joy-Anjan; Rishi Singh score: Sanjoy Chowdhury; Rishi Singh
- Production companies: D Neev Films; Netrix Entertainment Pvt. Ltd. Cinema Friday Int.
- Distributed by: T-Series (music); Netflix
- Release date: 5 July 2019
- Running time: 124 minutes
- Country: India
- Language: Hindi
- Box office: est. ₹4.68 crore (worldwide)

One Day: Justice Delivered is a 2019 Indian Hindi-language action thriller film produced by Kamlesh Singh Kushwaha, Ketan Patel and Swati Singh, written by Alaukik Rahi and directed by Ashok Nanda. The film starring Anupam Kher, Esha Gupta, Kumud Mishra, and Anusmriti Sarkar follows investigation by a police officer (played by Gupta), into the vanishing of important persons in a state capital. The film's soundtrack was composed by Vikrant-Parijat, Joy-Anjaan and Rishi Singh. It was theatrically released in India on 5 July 2019.

== Plot ==
Justice Omprakash Tyagi is living a post-retirement life with his family in Ranchi, Jharkhand. One day, after the marriage of his daughter, two high-profile doctors, Ajay Chopra and his wife Reena Chopra, go missing. The investigating officer of this case, ACP Satya Narayan Sharma, is unable to find any clue. With this ongoing investigation, another rich hotelier, Pankaj Singh, also goes missing while he was returning from Kolkata. As Sharma is unable to solve the case and due to excessive pressure from the politicians and media, these cases are handed over to crime branch officer DCP Laxmi Rathi. Two more people go missing, Dilawar Khan who works for MP Pravin Rawat and a car mechanic named Afzal Ahmed. On further investigation, the police discovers that all the missing persons are linked together. Afzal had planted a bomb in a vegetable market on the instructions of Dilawar. The money had been given by Pankaj on the charity front. Abdul, who had been an eyewitness, was alive, and the minority party leader made an issue. As it was difficult to stop him from revealing the truth, Dr. Ajay and Dr. Reena, who were treating Abdul, were bribed so that Abdul can be silenced (killed) in such a way that it looked natural. In Pankaj's hotel, a honeymoon couple's MMS was leaked to humiliate his family as he was the son of that Muslim leader. This ultimately leads to the death of his daughter-in-law committing suicide. MP Rawat was behind all of these. Rathi is ordered to keep an eye on both Rawat, and Mr. Tyagi as all of them were given bail by him, and he might be under threat from the actual culprit as he might be the next on the list. Next, Rawat goes missing, and it is revealed that Sharma was helping in the kidnapping of all these people. The actual mastermind was revealed to be Mr. Tyagi. He says that he has to give them bail as no shreds of evidence were found against them, but he knew all of them were wrong-doers. He also says that he didn't kill anyone, he just wanted their confession. Rathi says that he knew that they were behind these from some clues. While Tyagi and Sharma were leaving after handing over the confession videos of criminals, Rathi kills those kidnapped people and arrests Rawat, who later confesses about his criminal acts. The media said that the dead bodies of these people were found along with video clippings of their confessions, while police said that investigation is still on that who is behind punishing these criminals.

== Cast ==
- Anupam Kher as Rt. Justice Omprakash Tyagi
- Kumud Mishra as ACP Satya Narayan Sharma
- Esha Gupta as DCP Laxmi Rathi (Police officer from Crime Branch)
- Anusmriti Sarkar as Shagufta Singh
- Zakhir Hussain as MP Pravin Rawat
- Rajesh Sharma as Hotelier Pankaj Singh
- Murli Sharma as Dr. Ajay Chopra
- Deepshika Nagpal as Dr. Reena Chopra
- Nasir Khan as Advocate Lalit Rai
- Zareena Wahab as Parveen Bibi (Abdul's mother)
- Anant Mahadevan as Advocate Mukund Joshi
- Rinku Bharti Goswami as a Female Cop
- Kashyap Barbhaya as Shamim
- Jayaka Yagnik as Pooja Tyagi
- Saavi Chauhan as Sonia
- Alok Pandey as Mechanic Afzal Ahmed
- Poonam Rane as Rekha
- Nilofar Gesawat as Mrs. Tyagi
- Manoj Mishra as Dilawar Khan
- Irfan Razaa Khan as Inspector Vijay Pal
- Jeeban Panda as Parvez
- Akram Ali Khan as Rahul
- Mohaq Kansara as Abdul Shaikh (Parveen's late son)
- Monika Ravan (special appearance)
- Hema Sharma (special appearance)
- Kavya Kiran (special appearance)
- Raman Gupta (special appearance)

== Production ==
The filming was wrapped up in January 2019.

== Marketing and release ==
A new poster of the film released on 20 May 2019 by T Series.

The film was theatrically released on 5 July 2019.

== Reception ==
Devesh Sharma reviewing for Filmfare rates the film with 2.5/5 stars. He praised the performance of Kher and felt that the chief flaw of the film was in the writing, as characters were not shaped as per the ambience of the film. He wrote, "Vigilante justice films have to have the right mix of mayhem and violence. Director Ashok Nanda hasn't been able to offer the right balance and as a result, the film fails to make the kind of impact it was aiming for..." Shubhra Gupta of The Indian Express gave .5/5 star and felt the execution of the film was 'ham-fisted' from opening to closing frame, and the audience were left reeling. She opined that Esha Gupta's portrayal as a tough crime branch officer took away the 'credibility of the film' whatever it had. Archika Khurana of The Times of India gave the film 2.5/5 stars, praising the performance of Kher and Mishra, she felt that direction was 'sloppy and disjointed'. Khurana termed it as a "half-hearted tale of justice" and wrote that "the film which started as a good vigilante thriller, soon reduced to an average affair."

== Soundtrack ==
One Day: Justice Delivered

Soundtrack album by Joy – Anjan, Vikrant-Parijat and Rishi Singh
- Released: 21 May 2019
- Recorded: 2019
- Genre: Feature film soundtrack
- Length: 19:54
- Language: Hindi
- Label: T-Series
External audio
- Official Audio Jukebox on YouTube

The title track and "Tooh Hila Lo" are composed by Joy-Anjaan, and the lyrics are by Alaukik Rahi.

Track listing
No.	Title	Lyrics	Music	Singer(s)	Length
1.	"ONE DAY (Title Track)"	Alaukik Rahi	Joy- Anjan	Usha Uthup, Birina Pathak	3:14
2.	"Tooh Hila Lo"	Alaukik Rahi	Joy- Anjan	Divya Kumar, Farhad, Tia Bajpai	3:27
3.	"Nasha Mainu Chadh Gaya"	Alaukik Rahi	Rishi Singh	Nimisha, Rishi Singh	2:56
4.	"Khuda Maujood Hai"	Alaukik Rahi	Joy- Anjan	Farhad	2:32
5.	"Khuda Ka Noor"	Smita Kabra, Vinu Sagwan	Vikrant-Parijat	Sunidhi Chauhan, Vikrant	5:45
Total length:					19:54
