= Return of Hanuman =

- Official poster
- Directed by: Anurag Kashyap
- Written by: Anurag Kashyap; Amit Babbar
- Produced by: Percept Picture Company; Toonz Animation
- Starring: Pinky Rajput
- Edited by: Rajkumar Didwania
- Music by: Tapas Relia
- Production companies: Percept Picture Company; Toonz Animation; Anurag Kashyap Films
- Distributed by: Percept Picture Company
- Release date: 28 December 2007
- Running time: 110 minutes
- Country: India
- Language: Hindi
- Budget: ₹16 crore
- Box office: ₹6.14 crore

Return of Hanuman is a 2007 Indian Hindi-language animated action-adventure film directed by Anurag Kashyap. It is seemingly a sequel to Hanuman, it was produced by Shailendra Singh at Percept Picture Company and Toonz Animation, and the music was composed by Tapas Relia. It was released in India on 28 December 2007.

== Plot ==
Devas are 'busy' in their Swarglok (heaven). Technology has crossed the boundaries of earth and even non-mortal devas had become techno-geeks. They converse in Hinglish. Meanwhile, a terrific war is being fought between the Devas and the Asuras. In this war, Lord Vishnu slices the demon Rahuketu into two parts through his stomach. His collapse invokes the Guru of Asuras, Guru Shukracharya and he comes forward to battle with Lord Vishnu. He also slices a large snake named Kaladansha into two parts. Lord Vishnu gains the upper hand in the war and throws Shukracharya into space. Shukracharya announces a prophecy throughout the Universe warning Lord Vishnu that the same humans whom he is protecting, in Kali Yuga, will themselves become very cruel than even demons, and a day will come when their cruelty will give rise to the greatest demon of the Universe which will engulf the whole humankind. Shukracharya then transforms himself into Planet Shukra or Venus and it becomes the home of demons. Later he joins Rahuketu's sliced body with that of Kaladansh's tail and vice versa. This gives rise to two demons Rahu and Ketu. Shukracharya declares that as long as his Sarpdand i.e. Snake Wand lives, the demons will remain powerful.

Hanuman, who has just returned to heaven after completing his task on earth, is bored. He sees a village boy named Minku, who is bullied by his classmates. He decides to help him, not as a God or an invisible force but as a human. He then asks Lord Brahma to allow him to take birth as a human being. Brahma allows but keeps 5 conditions that Hanuman agrees to accept. He appears on earth in a village named Bajrangpur from a priest and his wife as a human baby. What makes the reincarnated Hanuman different from other humans is that he has a tail and a huge appetite. The baby is named "Maruti" by his mother. One night, when the priest was going back to his home, he was chased by some thugs, kidnapped, and then thrown inside a blockage. After Maruti is three months old, he is admitted to the same school where the boy he wanted to help studies and befriends him. Thereafter, he teaches a lesson to Tunnu and Tanki, his bully classmates, the one-eyed criminal, and his gang.

Meanwhile, on planet Shukra, there is a fight between Rahu and Ketu and accidentally the Sarpdand comes to Earth. Danavs come to Earth to search for it but they have to face Maruti. Maruti easily defeats Rahu and Ketu with the help of his army of monkeys that came to help him to get free from the hands of culprits (who caught him because he stole the mangoes from his garden). To defeat Rahu and Ketu, Narada must remind Maruti that he is Hanuman. After Narada and Maruti meet, Maruti is reminded that he can turn to Hanuman as per his will. Maruti then turns to the more powerful Hanuman, with his godly powers. He still has the appearance of a child but looks like the child Hanuman, the appearance from the film's predecessor. Then a monster made of polythene and other non-biodegradable waste appears from a volcano that was said to have formed when Sarpdand merged with the Kamandal thrown by Shukracharya which coincidentally fell into the volcano in Bajrangpur. The monsters keep on swallowing the villagers of Bajrangpur. After struggling to stop the monster, Hanuman asked for help from God Ram. God Ram then said that when a blockage, which is seen in the end, is cleared then the monster (mainly made of plastic and other waste thrown by humans) will finish up. Hanuman did what Ram said, and the monster was defeated. Finally, Hanuman said his farewells to his family and friends and left Bajrangpur.

== Voice Cast ==
- Malak Shah as Maruti
- Suraj Chaudhari as Minkoo
- Uday Sabnis as Brahma
- Dhananjai Shrestha as Indra
- Ayesha Raza as Maruti's mother
- Chetanya Adib as Hanuman
- Rajeev Raj as Narad
- Sudesh Bhosale as Owner
  - Sudesh Bhosale also voiced a silhouette character imitating the characters from Bollywood films
- Rajendra Gupta as Guru Shukracharya
- Pratibha Sharma as Minkoo's mother
- Girish Sahdev as Professor Antariksh
- Kenny Desai as Professor Jwalamukhi
- Gurpal Singh as Principal Bhullar
- Archie Maitra as Tunnu
- Aditya Rao as Dadoo
- Akshata as Munni
- Narendra Jha as Rahu and Ketu
- Parminder Ghumman as a one-eyed man (supposedly called a "one-eyed demon")
- Trilok Patel as Vishnu
- Ajay Singhal as Maruti's father

== Soundtrack ==
Return of Hanuman

Soundtrack album by Tapas Relia
- Released: 15 December 2007
- Genre: Feature film soundtrack
- Length: 39:12
- Label: T-Series

The film has seven songs, including two instrumental tracks, composed by Tapas Relia and with lyrics penned by Satish Mutatkar.

Track list
No.	Title	Artist(s)	Length
1.	"Aasman Ko Chukar"	Daler Mehandi	4:34
2.	"Superstar"	Hrishikesh Ranade	2:40
3.	"Hanuman Chalisa"	Shravan Rathod, Aparna Sen, Armaan, Sneha	12:37
4.	"Dhishum Dhishum"	Shravan Rathod	4:09
5.	"Blackhole"	Adnan Sami, Vijay Prakash Sharma, Mangal Mishara	4:50
6.	"Instrumental Medley"	Tapas Relia	6:13
7.	"Dhishum Dhishum (Karaoke Instrumental)"	Tapas Relia	4:09
Total length:			39:12

== Reception ==
Khalid Mohamed of Hindustan Times gave the film 3 out of 5, writing, "It could become a rocking franchise – the continuing adventures of baby Hanuman. Indeed the animation is pretty okay – no comparisons with Pixar or Disney please. And besides belting out entertainment, there are wise little lessons too."

Conversely, Sukanya Verma of Rediff.com gave the film 2 out of 5, writing. "While adults may question Kashyap's take on mythology or disapprove of Gods conversing in Hinglish, kids might find the action entertaining."

In 2019, director Anurag Kashyap called Return of Hanuman "a terrible film" and that he was "incapable of doing animation."

== Spin-offs ==
A spin-off series named The New Adventures of Hanuman was produced and aired on Pogo TV and Cartoon Network India. The series has some differences compared to the movie, such as Maruti staying in Bajrangpur instead of leaving it and several new characters. Maruti is also required to use a mace locket to turn into Hanuman.

In the mobile game space, Jump Games announced a two-year deal with Percept Pictures for the creation and distribution of Hanuman Returns mobile games, at a launch event in Mumbai that featured film director, David Dhawan.

== See also ==
- List of Indian animated feature films
- Anurag Kashyap filmography
- List of Hindi films of 2007
