= Bombay Velvet =

2015 Indian film by Anurag Kashyap

- Theatrical release poster
- Directed by: Anurag Kashyap
- Written by: Vasan Bala; Gyan Prakash; Anurag Kashyap; S.Thanikachalam
- Based on: Mumbai Fables by: Gyan Prakash
- Produced by: Vikas Bahl; Vikramaditya Motwane
- Starring: Ranbir Kapoor; Anushka Sharma; Karan Johar; Kay Kay Menon
- Cinematography: Rajeev Ravi
- Edited by: Prerna Saigal
- Music by: Amit Trivedi
- Production company: Phantom Films
- Distributed by: Fox Star Studios
- Release date: 15 May 2015
- Running time: 149 minutes
- Country: India
- Language: Hindi
- Budget: ₹118 crore
- Box office: ₹43.13 crore

Bombay Velvet is a 2015 Indian Hindi-language neo-noir period crime film directed and co-produced by Anurag Kashyap, based on historian Gyan Prakash's book Mumbai Fables. It stars Ranbir Kapoor, Anushka Sharma and Karan Johar in lead roles with Kay Kay Menon, Manish Choudhary, Vivaan Shah and Siddhartha Basu in supporting roles. The film was released on 15 May 2015.

The film, made on a budget of ₹120 crore, grossed around ₹23 crore in the first week. It opened to mixed reviews and emerged as a commercial disaster.

== Plot ==
In 1969 Bombay, Balraj is a street fighter/boxer who is in love with the jazz singer Rosie. Seeing Rosie with wealthy men further sparks his dream of becoming a "big-shot", believing that if he manages to become rich, he might win Rosie's heart. Balraj and his friend Chimman then catch the eye of Kaizad Khambatta, a wealthy businessman who is impressed by Balraj and offers him the chance to manage his club "Bombay Velvet", which Khambatta uses to further his illegal tasks and activities. He also nicknames Balraj "Johnny", which then becomes his identification. As well as this, Johnny and Chimman fulfill minor tasks for Khambatta, including capturing a dirty photograph of a minister who Khambatta wants to blackmail. This news reaches Jimmy Mistri, a media reporter, who also happens to be the same wealthy man Johnny had previously seen Rosie with.

Remembering that Johnny has a crush on Rosie, Mistri takes advantage of this and sends Rosie to Johnny's club to get her hands on the photograph of the minister. However, Rosie and Johnny eventually fall in love, and Mistri threatens to reveal Rosie's true identity to Johnny. Therefore, Rosie begins to supply information about Johnny & Khambatta's activities to Mistri. After a photograph of a secret meeting between Bombay's big-shots is leaked, Khambatta guesses that it was Rosie supplying the information and orders her to be killed. Johnny hears of this and forms an enmity with Khambatta, the man who brought him into the crime world.

Johnny fakes Rosie's death and makes her act as if she is her long dead twin sister Rita. But soon Khambatta realises the truth, kidnaps Rosie and tries to kill Johnny and they get into a standoff at Bombay Velvet. Khambatta shoots Rosie to provoke Johnny. Johnny angry at this stabs Khambatta and is himself shot dead while trying to carry Rosie to the hospital, outside the club. It is revealed before the end credits that Rosie survived her gunshot.

== Cast ==
- Ranbir Kapoor as "Johnny" Balraj, a street fighter
- Anushka Sharma as Rosie Noronha / Rita Noronha (Fake), a jazz singer
- Karan Johar as Kaizad Khambatta, a quick-witted, flamboyant Parsi media mogul with a high-end attitude
- Manish Choudhary as Jamshed "Jimmy" Mistry, a newspaper editor
- Satyadeep Mishra as Chimman Chopra, Balraj's friend
- Kay Kay Menon as Inspector Vishwas Kulkarni, a detective
- Siddhartha Basu as Romi Patel
- Remo Fernandes as a Portuguese man
- Vivaan Shah as Tony, Noronha's chauffeur
- Sarika Singh as Chimman's wife
- Shaanti as Hiral, Khambatta's wife
- Vicky Kaushal as Basil, Kulkarni's subordinate
- Mukesh Chhabra
- Varun Grover (Cameo) as a standup comedian
- Raveena Tandon (Cameo)
- Mrinmoy Goldar (Cameo)
- Christopher Hutton as himself (Cameo)
- Angelina Shum as herself (cameo)

== Production ==
=== Development ===
Kashyap was inspired to make such a film after reading L.A. Quartet, a sequence of four crime fiction novels by James Ellroy, set in the late 1940s through the late 1950s in Los Angeles.

Bombay Velvet was initially to be produced by Viacom18, but Fox STAR Studios decided to co-produce it with Phantom Films. It is based on Gyan Prakash's book Mumbai Fables and set in early 1950s towards 1970s, before Mumbai became a metropolis. Prakash is also one of the scriptwriters for the film.

=== Casting ===
Although Hrithik Roshan, Aamir Khan, Ranveer Singh and Saif Ali Khan were considered, Ranbir Kapoor was cast as a street fighter, and Anushka Sharma was cast as a jazz singer. Kapoor explained his casting, "The script of Bombay Velvet just fell into my lap. I read it and I knew immediately that I wanted to be part of Anurag's grand vision, his innovative storytelling, his movie-making process; everything that he does so perfectly." This was director Karan Johar's second film as an actor after Dilwale Dulhania Le Jayenge (1995) and his first as a lead; he was cast as the film's primary antagonist, Kaizad Khambata. His role is said to have been inspired from Russi Karanjia.

=== Filming ===
Principal photography began in mid-July 2013 and continued till early September 2013. The first schedule was shot at Sri Lanka's Ranmihitenna Mahinda Rajapaksa National Tele Cinema Park, Hambantota. Filming was also done in Colombo, Galle, and Pasikudah. The second schedule was also in Mahinda Rajapaksa National Tele Cinema Park, Sri Lanka, where Sharma and Kapoor rejoined the filming in February. The second schedule completed in March. Parts of the set was left at the National Tele Cinema Park, rather than being dismantled, as it will be used as a tourist attraction site. The third and final schedule was in Mumbai where shooting was held for a ten-day period.

=== Editing ===
The film was released in only one version and was edited in collaboration by Prerna Saigal (The Lunchbox (2013)) and Academy Award-winning editor Thelma Schoonmaker.

=== Themes ===
Bombay Velvet is influenced by Classic Hollywood cinema including Film Noir with its stereotypical caricatures like gangsters, gun molls and femme fatales. The movie draws inspiration from gangster films of the '30s and the '40s like The Roaring Twenties (1939) and White Heat (1949) and neo-noir films like Chinatown (1974) and L.A. Confidential (1997).

== Marketing ==
The film attracted brand associations worth Rs. 20 Crore with brands like Reliance Jio Chat, Saavn, Gillette, GoDaddy among others. To build hype and buzz around the film, Fox Star India and Phantom Films crowdsourced the official fan art for the movie by running a poster design contest on Cupick.

Bombay Velvet Movie Game, a promotional mobile video game based on the film was developed by Nazara Technologies and released the same year.

== Soundtrack ==
The soundtrack for Bombay Velvet is composed by Amit Trivedi, which he began working on the soundtrack after the release of Dev D. Amit stated in an interview that, "The music of Bombay Velvet will reflect the age of 1960s Jazz era of Bollywood." The lyrics were written by Amitabh Bhattacharya. The album was released on 24 April 2015 by Zee Music Company, which took care of the film's audio rights.

The song "Fifi" is a remake of the Hindi song "Jaata Kahaan Hai Deewane" from the 1956 film C.I.D. which was originally composed by O. P. Nayyar and written by Majrooh Sultanpuri. It was re-created by Mickey McCleary.

== Release ==
The film released on 15 May 2015 in 2600 screens worldwide.

=== Critical reception ===
Performances of Kapoor, Sharma and Johar received positive reviews, but the incoherent script and direction were heavily criticized. Arunava Chatterjee of India Today rated it 3.5 stars and said, "While vintage seems to be the new fad in Bollywood, Bombay Velvet deserves a standing ovation in this age of run-of-the-mill Friday releases." Bollywood Hungama also gave it 3.5 stars and said, "On the whole, Bombay Velvet is a visual masterpiece that is rich in form. If you want to be wowed by the detailing of the 1960s, superb performances of Kapoor, Sharma and Johar, then go ahead and watch this film." Shubha Saha of Mid-Day gave Bombay Velvet 3.5 stars and said, "Bombay Velvet is more like a roller coaster ride, as it takes you on a dizzy high with its charming ambience and music that is bound to stay with you for long, but later you are brought down not so gently with the underwhelming plot and lack of punches. Watch it for the experience."

=== Box office ===
The film collected ₹52 million (US$540,000) on the first day.

== Awards and nominations ==
Award	Category	Nominees	Result, Ref.
Mirchi Music Awards	Best Song Producer (Programming & Arranging)	Sovon Mukherjee & Amit Trivedi - "Dhadaam Dhadaam"	Nominated
Asian Film Awards	Best Composer	Amit Trivedi	Nominated
Ghanta Awards	Worst Film	Bombay Velvet	Nominated
Ghanta Awards	Worst Actress	Anushka Sharma	Nominated
