= Anurag Kashyap =

Indian filmmaker and actor (born 1970)

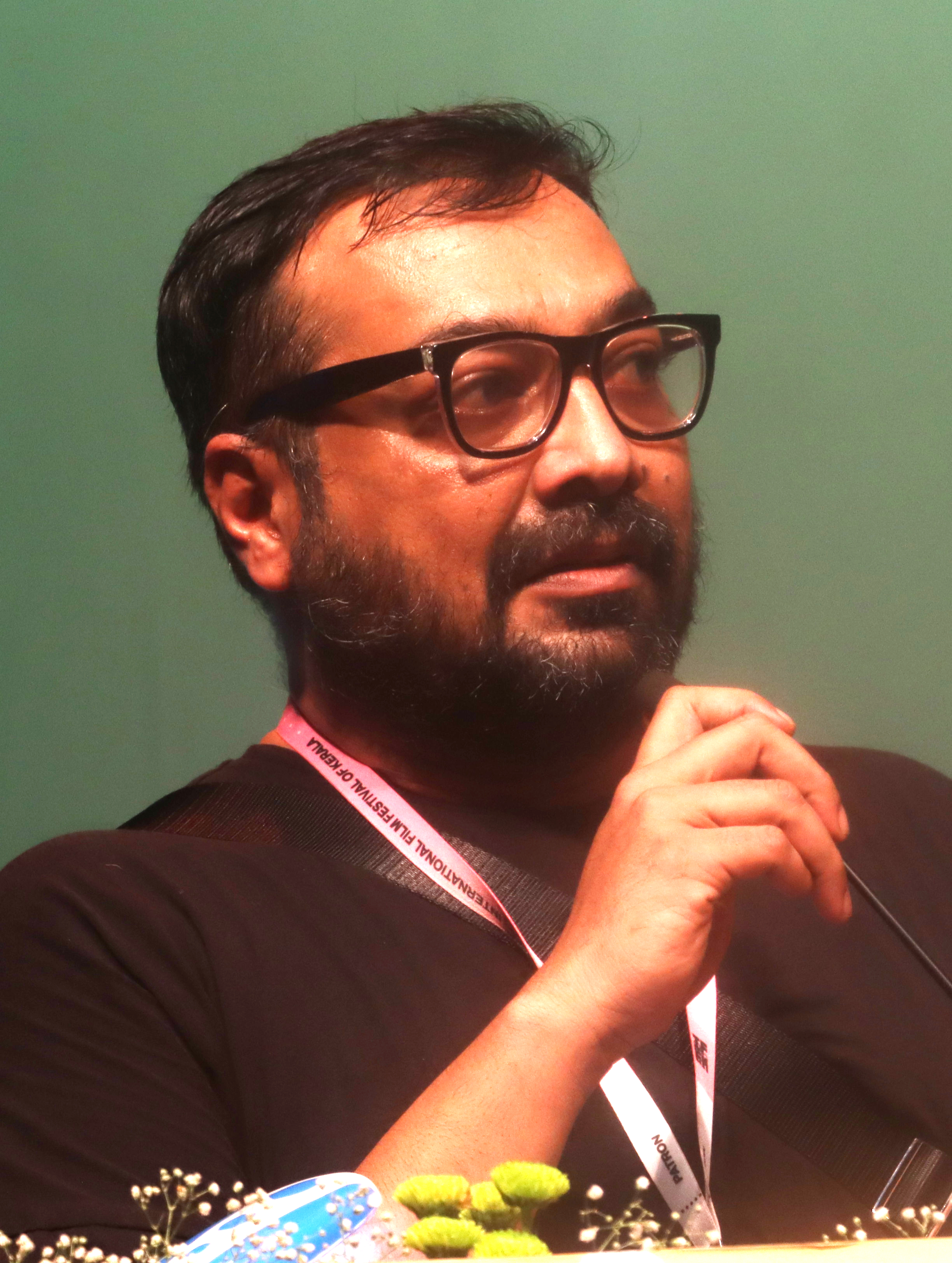
- Anurag at IFFK 2022
- Born: Rinku Singh; 10 September 1972 (age 54); Gorakhpur, Uttar Pradesh, India
- Education: Hansraj College (Zoology); Scindia School, Gwalior; Hillgrange Preparatory School Dehradun
- Occupations: Film director; film producer; screenwriter; actor
- Years active: 1997–present
- Works: Full list
- Spouses: Aarti Bajaj (m. 1997; div. 2009) Kalki Koechlin (m. 2011; div. 2015)
- Children: 1
- Relatives: Abhinav Kashyap (brother)
- Awards: Order of Arts and Letters; Yash Bharti Award

Anurag Kashyap (born 10 September 1972) is an Indian filmmaker and actor known for his works in Hindi and Tamil films. He is the recipient of four Filmfare Awards. The Government of France made him a Knight of the Order of Arts and Letters in 2013.

Kashyap got his major break as a co-writer in Ram Gopal Varma's crime drama Satya (1998) and made his directorial debut with Paanch, which never had a theatrical release due to censorship issues. He then went on to direct Black Friday (2004), a film based on the namesake book by Hussain Zaidi about the 1993 Bombay bombings. Its release was held up for two years by the District Board of Film Certification because of the pending verdict of the case at that time but was released in 2007 to critical appreciation. Kashyap's follow-up, No Smoking (2007) met with mixed reviews and performed poorly at the box-office. His next venture Dev.D (2009), a modern adaptation of Devdas, received positive reviews and was a commercial success; followed by the socio-political drama Gulaal (2009).

Kashyap's prominence increased with the two-part crime drama, Gangs of Wasseypur (2012), which received worldwide critical acclaim and moderate box office success and considered a cult film now. Kashyap subsequently co-produced the critically acclaimed drama The Lunchbox (2013), and the biographical drama Shahid (2012), the former earned him a BAFTA Award for Best Film Not in the English Language nomination. His next acclaimed films were the anthology Bombay Talkies (2013), the drama Ugly (2014), Raman Raghav 2.0 (2016), inspired by the serial killer Raman Raghav and Mukkabaaz (2018). He also co-directed India's first Netflix Original series, the crime thriller Sacred Games, based on Vikram Chandra's novel of the same name and the romantic drama Manmarziyaan.

== Early life ==
Kashyap was born on 10 September 1972 to a Gaharwar Rajput family in Gorakhpur, Uttar Pradesh. His father Prakash Singh is a retired Chief Engineer of the Uttar Pradesh Rajya Vidyut Utpadan Nigam Limited and was posted in Obra Thermal Power Station in Sonbhadra district near Varanasi.

He did his primary schooling from Hillgrange Preparatory School in Dehradun, and grade seven onwards, from the Scindia School in Gwalior.

Some of the locations used in Gangs of Wasseypur are also influenced from his own old house where he himself lived with his parents, sister, Anubhuti Kashyap, and brother, Abhinav Kashyap. Abhinav is also a filmmaker, who made his directorial debut with the masala blockbuster, Dabangg (2010). Anubhuti has been his assistant in most of his films. She made her directorial debut with Doctor G (2022), a medical campus comedy, starring Ayushmann Khurrana, Rakul Preet Singh, Shefali Shah and Sheeba Chaddha.

Owing to his desire to become a scientist, Kashyap went to Delhi for his higher studies and enrolled himself into a zoology course at the Hansraj College (University of Delhi); he graduated in 1993. He then eventually joined the street theatre group, Jana Natya Manch; and did many street plays. The same year, couple of his friends "urged [him] to catch a de Sica retrospective" at the International Film Festival of India. In ten days, he saw 55 films at the festival, and Vittorio De Sica's Bicycle Thieves was the film that influenced him the most.

== Career ==
"As a 19-year-old student of zoology at Delhi's Hansraj College, I had no desire to be a filmmaker. Till I watched Bicycle Thieves, a 1948 Italian film directed by Vittorio De Sica, at a film festival in Delhi in 1993. After the film got over, I decided to chuck it all and leave bag-and-baggage for Bombay to be a filmmaker."

— Kashyap on how one film changed his life.

After the de Sica experience, Kashyap arrived in Mumbai in 1993 with INR 5,000 in his pocket. Soon the money ran out, and he spent months on the streets, staying in lofts, "sleeping on beaches", "under a water tank and in the St Xavier's [college] boys hostel." He then managed to find work at Prithvi Theatre, but his first play remained incomplete because the director died.

=== Writer and director ===
==== 1990–1999 ====
In 1995, an acquaintance introduced Kashyap to Shivam Nair. The day they met, Kashyap watched Taxi Driver (1976) at Nair's place, and the film inspired him to "write something". The team of Sriram Raghavan, Sridhar Raghavan and Shiv Subramaniam were working on two projects, one of which was a short TV series, Auto Narayan, based on the life of serial killer Auto Shankar; the second one was a film scripted by Kashyap. Auto Narayan got delayed because the script written by Subramaniam was not "working". Kashyap rewrote the script and got credit for the same, but it was scrapped. In 1997, he wrote the screenplay of Hansal Mehta's first film, Jayate which failed to find a theatrical release; and episodes of the TV series Kabhie Kabhie (1997).

In 1998, actor Manoj Bajpayee suggested his name to Ram Gopal Varma to write a film. Varma liked Kashyap's Auto Narayan and hired him, alongside Saurabh Shukla to write the script for his crime film, Satya (1998). Satya was a critical and commercial success, and is regarded as one of the best films of Indian cinema. He later collaborated with Varma in scripting Kaun (1999) and writing dialogues for Shool (1999). In 1999, he made a short film, titled Last Train to Mahakali for television. He wrote dialogues for Nayak: The Real Hero.

==== 2000–2009 ====
While working with Nair, Kashyap came across files related to the Joshi-Abhyankar serial murders that took place in Pune in 1976, which became the inspiration for his directorial debut Paanch. A crime thriller about a group of five friends of a rock band who turn into criminals. The film faced trouble with the Central Board of Film Certification because the board felt that it dealt unapologetically with sex, drugs and celebrated violence. It was cleared by the Board in 2001, but remains unreleased due to some problems faced by the producer. In these years, he also wrote dialogues for many films including Paisa Vasool (2004), Mani Ratnam's Yuva (2004), the Canadian film Water (2005), Main Aisa Hi Hoon (2005) and Mixed Doubles (2006).

After a failed attempt to make Allwyn Kalicharan in 2003, Kashyap started working on Black Friday, a film based on the namesake book by Hussain Zaidi about the 1993 Bombay bombings. The Bombay high court put a stay on the release of the film, until the judgement in the bomb blasts case was delivered. It was decided after a petition filed by a group of 1993 bomb blasts accused, challenging the release of the film based on their case. The film got censorship clearance in 2007, and was released after two years meeting universal acclaim. Nikhat Kazmi gave the film a three star out of five rating and mentioned: "It was indeed a difficult film to make, yet the director has managed to grapple with all the loose threads and put them together in a composite whole. So much so, the film moves like a taut thriller, without ideology coloring the sepia frames."

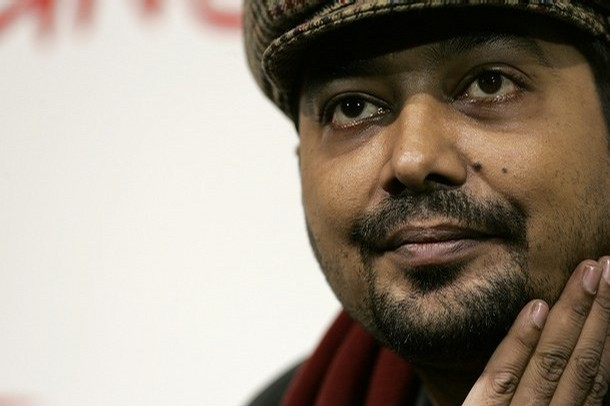
Kashyap attending the Rome Film Festival in 2007

The same year, Kashyap adapted Stephen King's short story "Quitters, Inc." into No Smoking. A surrealistic thriller about a chain-smoker who gets trapped in the maze of a person who guarantees will make him quit smoking. The film starring John Abraham, Ayesha Takia, Ranvir Shorey and Paresh Rawal in the leads with music by Vishal Bhardwaj, premiered at the Rome Film Festival. No Smoking received an overwhelming negative reception and failed at the box-office. CNN-IBN's Rajeev Masand called it a "colossal disappointment". His final release of the year was Return of Hanuman, an animation film about adventures of the Hindu god Hanuman.

In 2009, Kashyap had two releases. Dev.D, a contemporary takes on Sarat Chandra Chattopadhyay's novel Devdas. It was the twelfth film adaptation of the Bengali novel. Starring Abhay Deol who actually pitched the original idea of the film to Kashyap, with Mahie Gill and newcomer Kalki Koechlin portraying the characters of "Paro" and Chandramukhi respectively. The film met with generally positive reviews and strong box office results. Gulaal, a political drama, was his final release of that year. Kashyap started working on the film in 2005 and had finished 70–80 per cent of the film in 2006, when its producer fell ill. Later on, Zee Motion Pictures took over the project and was finally finished in 2008 and released on 13 March 2009. Anupama Chopra gave the film three stars and referred to Kashyap as "the Anti-Yash Chopra". Despite positive reviews, the film underperformed at the box office.

==== 2010s ====
Mumbai Cutting (2010), an anthology film, was his next directorial venture. It consisted of eleven short films made by eleven directors. He directed one of the short films. It premiered at the 2008 Indian Film Festival of Los Angeles.

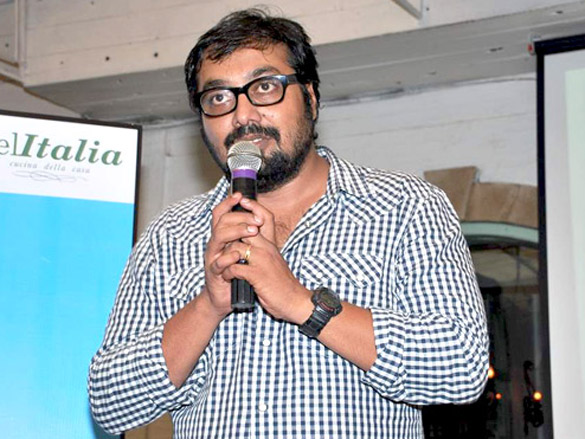
Kashyap at a press meet for Udaan, 2010.

In 2011, Kashyap directed That Girl in Yellow Boots, a thriller starring Kalki Koechlin who also co-wrote the film with him. The film was screened at many festivals including 2010 Toronto International Film Festival, 67th Venice International Film Festival, Indian Film Festival of Los Angeles and the London Indian Film Festival. Shot in thirteen days, the film was released in September 2011. Roger Ebert gave it 3.5 out of 4 stars, praising the character-driven film and the portrayal of its lead alongside the city compared to most Hindi films: " a film like this provides a radically different view of India than you can find in the pleasures and excesses of Bollywood".

In 2012, Kashyap came up with his ambitious directorial venture Gangs of Wasseypur, which screened at the 2012 Cannes Directors' Fortnight, London Indian Film Festival, Toronto film festival and the Sundance Film Festival in 2013. The film with an ensemble cast, was a two-part crime saga centered on the coal mafia of Dhanbad with the story spanning from the early 1940s to 2009. The first part was released on 22 June, and the second on 8 August 2012, both receiving appreciation from Indian and international critics alike. The combined budget of the two films allowed it to be a box-office success.

In 2013, Kashyap directed That Day After Everyday, a 20-minute short film that was released on YouTube; starring Radhika Apte, Geetanjali Thapa and Sandhya Mridul. It showed the story of three working women facing troubles every day, both inside and outside their houses and how they overcome them. Dealing with issues like eve teasing and public molestation, the video got four lakh hits in two days. Speaking about the purpose of the project, Kashyap showed his intention to make people feel angry without offering a solution. The same year he teamed up with Dibakar Banerjee, Zoya Akhtar and Karan Johar to direct "Murabba", one of the four segments of anthology film Bombay Talkies. It was made to celebrate the 100 years of Indian cinema, and was screened at the 2013 Cannes Film Festival. The film did not perform well at the box office, but was well received by critics.

His next film was Ugly (2014), a thriller about the kidnapping of a struggling actor's daughter, and the events followed by it. It was screened in the Directors' Fortnight section at the 2013 Cannes Film Festival, receiving a standing ovation. The film's theatrical release was halted for over a year regarding censorship issues over depiction of smoking in it. Though it was released on 26 December 2014 to generally positive reviews.

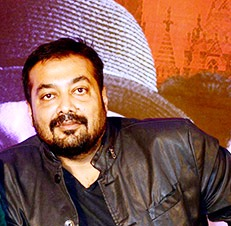
Kashyap at the second trailer launch of Bombay Velvet.

Kashyap's next release was Bombay Velvet (2015), a period film set in Bombay in the 1960s, based on Princeton University Historian Gyan Prakash's book Mumbai Fables. It stars Ranbir Kapoor, Anushka Sharma and Karan Johar. The film was co-edited by the Academy Award winner editor Thelma Schoonmaker, who is known for her collaboration with Martin Scorsese. Released on 15 May 2015, some critics appreciated its retro-look, performances, styling and music, but criticized its faltered storytelling. It also emerged as a box-office failure. Bombay Velvet was Kashyap's dream project and its failure was a huge disappointment to him. In an interview with critic Rajeev Masand, Kashyap stated that at one point he wanted to leave India because he felt that people here did not understand his films but then realized that he did not manage the budget of the film.

A die-hard comics enthusiast, Anurag Kashyap once reached out to Raj Comics—one of India's biggest comic book companies—to acquire the rights to their gritty vigilante character Doga, envisioning what could have been India's first proper superhero film with a distinctly dark, grounded tone. After detailed discussions, he successfully secured the rights and began developing the project, positioning it as a major cinematic leap post Bombay Velvet. However, the scale of a superhero film demanded a massive budget, making the entire fate of Doga heavily dependent on the box office performance of Bombay Velvet—if it succeeded, the film would greenlight Kashyap's ambitious vision. Unfortunately, the film failed miserably at the box office, collapsing under its own expectations, and with that financial blow, the Doga project fell apart, quietly slipping into development hell and leaving behind a fascinating "what could have been" moment in Indian cinema history.

In 2016, Kashyap co-wrote and directed Raman Raghav 2.0, a thriller inspired by the notorious serial killer Raman Raghav. It starred Nawazuddin Siddiqui as the title character along with Vicky Kaushal. The film premiered at the 2016 Sydney Film Festival and the 2016 Cannes Film Festival, in the Director's Fortnight section to a positive response.

After working on Raman Raghav 2.0, Kashyap received a script from Vineet Kumar Singh of Mukkabaaz. He did not like the initial script but was excited by a "10-minute chunk" that he had not come across before. He then rewrote the script with his team having the 10-minute as a base. Singh trained himself for six months for the film. The film was screened at 2017 Toronto International Film Festival, the Mumbai Film Festival and was released theatrically on 12 January 2018. Saibal Chatterjee of NDTV called it "one of the more important films to have come out of the Mumbai movie industry in recent times." In 2018, Kashyap again collaborated with Banerjee, Akhtar and Johar for the anthology film Lust Stories. Based on the theme of lust, it had stories told from the female perspective. Kashyap's story had Radhika Apte and Akash Thosar. The film was released on Netflix on 15 June 2018. It was followed by India's first Netflix Original series, the crime thriller Sacred Games, based on Vikram Chandra's novel of the same name. Kashyap co-directed the series with Vikramaditya Motwane. The show received critical acclaim, with Lincoln Michel of GQ calling it the "best Netflix original in years." His final directorial venture of the year was Manmarziyaan, a love triangle set in Punjab, starring Abhishek Bachchan, Tapsee Pannu and Vicky Kaushal. Written by Kanika Dhillon, the film was premiered at the 2018 Toronto International Film Festival and was released in India on 16 September to positive reviews. In December 2019, Kashyap launched the audio web-series titled Thriller Factory which he directed for Amazon's Audible Suno application. It features voices of Tabu and Nawazuddin Siddiqui.

==== 2020s ====
The next year, Kashyap reunited with his Lust Stories team to direct the horror anthology film Ghost Stories. His story was about a pregnant woman going through anxiety. It was released on Netflix on 1 January 2020. He continued his association with Netflix and released his directorial venture Choked (2020) on the same. Starring Saiyami Kher and Roshan Mathew, the film tells the story of a bank cashier who finds a stash of cash hidden in her kitchen sink.

In 2022, Kashyap directed the science fiction thriller Dobaaraa. The film is an official remake of the 2018 Spanish film Mirage; it opened at the London Indian Film Festival and was released theatrically on 19 August 2022. Dobaaraa met with mostly positive reviews with Tanul Thakur of The Wire writing: "A sharp adaptation, the film is deeper than it cares to admit and never slips into an instructional mode."

Just months after releasing Dobaara, Kashyap released another directorial venture titled Almost Pyaar with DJ Mohabbat. The musical romantic drama starred Alaya F and debutant Karan Mehta. It had its world premiere at the 2022 Marrakech International Film Festival and the film was released theatrically on 3 February 2023.

In 2023, Kashyap wrote and directed the thriller film Kennedy. He initially wanted to cast Vikram and had named the film after Vikram's real name. However, they could not work together because of some miscommunication. The role eventually went to Rahul Bhat; Sunny Leone also appears in a pivotal role. The film had its world premiere at the 2023 Cannes Film Festival.

His next directorial venture, Bandar, starring Bobby Deol, Sanya Malhotra, Sapna Pabbi, and Saba Azad, in pivotal roles, premiered at the 2025 Toronto International Film Festival. It was theatrically released on 5 June 2026 to positive reviews from critics. However, the film received criticism for its misogynistic undertones, and its themes were said to be out of touch with the MeToo movement. Kashyap acknowledged the validity of the criticisms, and further stated that the final cut of the film was not his original, and therefore, he distanced himself from the film.

=== Producer ===
Kashyap found his production company Anurag Kashyap Films in 2009, which is managed by Guneet Monga. The companies' first film was the critical hit Udaan (2010), which was screened in the Un Certain Regard category at the 2010 Cannes Film Festival. Since then, he has produced a number of projects including Shaitan (2011), Chittagong (2012), Aiyyaa (2012), Luv Shuv Tey Chicken Khurana (2012) and Shorts (2013). He has also co-produced a number of films that have gone on to film festivals, including Michael, Peddlers and Monsoon Shootout. In 2012, Kashyap produced The Last Act, India's first collaborative feature film from twelve directors to make ten-minute short films, with each film being a part of a larger story written by him.

In 2013, his company co-produced the critically acclaimed drama The Lunchbox, which was nominated for the BAFTA Award for Best Film Not in the English Language; along with the biographical drama Shahid. The same year Kashyap, with Viacom 18 Motion Pictures co-produced five short films with the theme of 'India is Visual Journey'. The short films were Moi Marjaani, Chai, Hidden Cricket, Geek Out and The Epiphany. He also served as the creative director in the Amitabh Bachchan starrer TV series Yudh (2014), and subsequently presented two documentary films, The World Before Her (2012) and Katiyabaaz (2014).

In 2011 Kashyap co-founded his director-driven production company Phantom Films with partnership from Vikas Bahl, Vikramaditya Motwane and Madhu Mantena. The company's first film was the period romance Lootera (2013), starring Ranveer Singh and Sonakshi Sinha. Based on O. Henry's short story, The Last Leaf, the film was critically acclaimed.

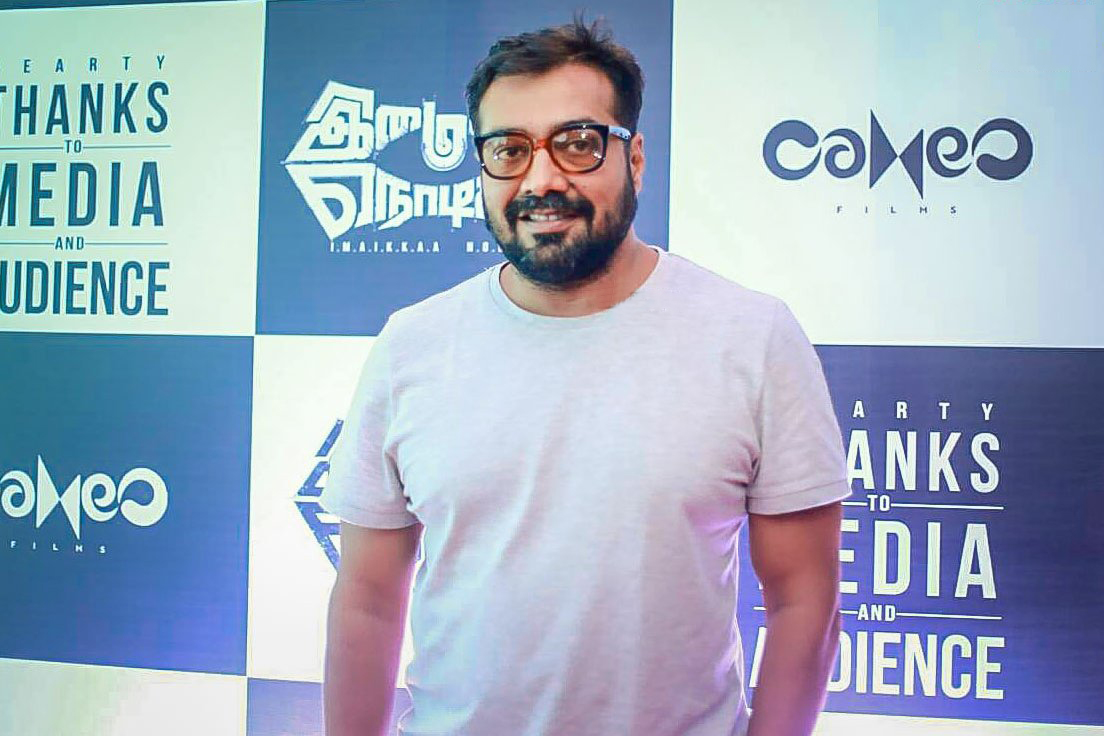
Kashyap at the success meet of Imaikaa Nodigal in 2018.

He then went on to collaborate with Karan Johar's Dharma Productions to produce the romantic comedy Hasee Toh Phasee (2014). The film, starring Parineeti Chopra and Sidharth Malhotra, was directed by the debutant Vinil Mathew. Kashyap then co-edited and co-produced the comedy drama Queen, starring Kangana Ranaut. The film was a critical and commercial success; it also won the National Film Award for Best Feature Film in Hindi.

In 2015, Kashyap co-produced Anushka Sharma's production debut NH10, and the sex comedy Hunterrr. Both films proved to be successes. Masaan, was Phantom's fourth release of the year. The film won the FIPRESCI Award and the Promising Future award at the 2015 Cannes Film Festival. The final release of Phantom of 2015 was Shaandaar, which proved to be a box-office flop. In October the same year, Kashyap teamed up with Ridley Scott and Richie Mehta for Google, as the executive producer for the documentary India in a Day. The project was for people across India to film a snapshot of their day and upload it on Google's official website.

The following year, Kashyap collaborated again with Ekta Kapoor to produce Udta Punjab (2016), a crime drama by the director Abhishek Chaubey that documents the substance abuse endemic in the Indian state of Punjab. Udta Punjab generated controversy when the Central Board of Film Certification demanded extensive censorship before its theatrical release, citing that the portrayal of Punjab in it was negative. After Kashyap filed a lawsuit against the board, the Mumbai High Court cleared the film for exhibition with a single scene cut. His company, Phantom Films, also produced a Gujarati film Wrong Side Raju, that same year. Kashyap co-produced Haraamkhor (2017), the survival drama Trapped (2016) and the superhero film Bhavesh Joshi Superhero (2018).

Phantom Films was dissolved in October 2018, largely in response to the sexual assault allegation on Vikas Bahl by a former Phantom employee, which was reported in 2015. Kashyap, and the other three founders issued statements on Twitter confirming the company's disbanding and moving on to independent projects. In 2020, Kashyap launched another production company titled Good Bad Films with partnership from Dhruv Jagasia and Akshay Thakker. Their maiden production was Choked.

=== Actor ===
Kashyap has made cameo appearances in his films and those of others, including Black Friday, No Smoking, Tera Kya Hoga Johnny (2008), Luck by Chance (2009), Dev.D, Gulaal, Soundtrack (2011), Trishna (2011), Bhoothnath Returns (2014), Happy New Year (2014) and I Am (2010), playing a child abuser. The same year, he played a police officer in the short film Encounter (2010), co-starring Nimrat Kaur. In 2011, he playing the full-fledged role of the antagonist Bunty Bhaiya in Tigmanshu Dhulia's crime thriller Shagird (2011).

In 2016, Kashyap starred in AR Murugadoss's Akira, starring Sonakshi Sinha; where he played the role of a corrupt police officer. In 2017, he acted in the short film titled Chhuri, alongside Tisca Chopra and Surveen Chawla. He also played the role of the antagonist in the Tamil-language thriller Imaikkaa Nodigal (2018) directed by R. Ajay Gnanamuthu. In 2020, Kashyap played an exaggerated version of himself in AK vs AK directed by Vikramaditya Motwane, opposite Anil Kapoor. He also wrote the dialogues and served as one of the executive producers.

In 2024, Kashyap played the role of villain Kazbe in Disney+ Hotstar's Bad Cop.

In June 2024, Kashyap starred as Selvam in the Tamil movie Maharaja alongside Vijay Sethupathi. He received widespread critical acclaim for essaying a layered negative role. His performance also garnered international attention with director Alejandro Gonzales Innaritu offering Kashyap a role in his upcoming project.

== Personal life ==
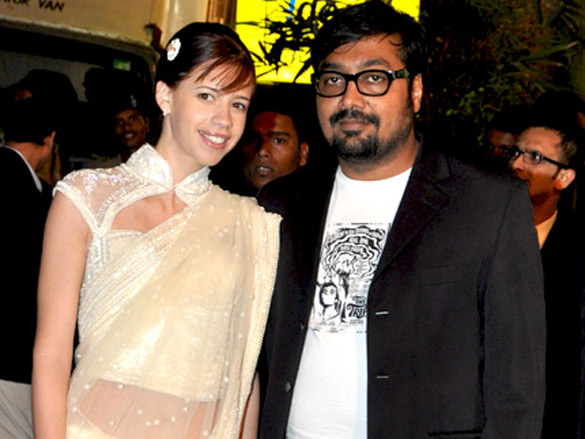
Kashyap, with his then-wife Kalki Koechlin at the 2009 Filmfare Awards

Kashyap was first married to film editor Aarti Bajaj, with whom he has a daughter, Aaliyah Kashyap. They divorced in 2009. He later married actress Kalki Koechlin, whom he first met during the making of Dev D, at her maternal home in Ooty. In 2013, Kashyap and Koechlin announced that: "they are taking time apart from their more than two-year-old marriage". In May 2015, they were divorced at the Bandra family court in Mumbai. As of September 2026, he is in a relationship with Shubhra Shetty, who worked as an assistant director at Phantom Films. The two live in Bengaluru.

When asked about his religious views, Kashyap replied: "I am an atheist. Cinema is the only religion I believe in."

On 3 March 2021, the Income Tax Department raided 28 locations in Mumbai and Pune in connection with tax evasion by firm Phantom Films connected to Anurag Kashyap. Income Tax Department said it found a discrepancy of around ₹300 crore which the Kashyap company official has not been able to explain.

== Style, themes and influences ==
Kashyap is regarded as an auteur and is credited for pioneering India's indie scene in the early 2000s. While promoting Bombay Talkies in Anupama Chopra's show, Dibakar Banerjee described Kashyap's aesthetics as "purely new age or purely Indian"; projecting "modern post independence India" in his films. He prefers shooting on real locations by employing guerrilla-filmmaking techniques with hidden cameras, and often makes his actors improvise their dialogues on set. In Ugly, he did not show the script to any of the lead actors. He frequently uses hand-held camera and experimental soundtracks.

Filmmaker Zoya Akhtar wrote: "He has a very strong storytelling style and he proved that you could tell a great story with not a lot of money." Actor Ranbir Kapoor said, "All his films may not be big money spinners but the impact Anurag has, his contribution to Indian cinema, is immense." Canadian film critic and festival programmer Cameron Bailey has called Kashyap as "one of the most knowledgeable filmmakers".

The protagonists of his films often deal with excessive drug, smoke or alcohol consumption, personal guilt, extreme rage and arrogance which leads them into self-shattering situations. Often portrays small but strong female characters. Most of his films deal with realistic scenarios and take clues from real incidents, like the 1976–77 Joshi-Abhyankar serial murders reference in Paanch, the 1993 Mumbai bombing in Black Friday, the 1999 Delhi hit-and-run case and DPS MMS Scandal in Dev.D and the depiction of real life gang wars in Gangs of Wasseypur. Ugly came from his "personal guilt" of not spending enough time with his daughter and the fear of losing her. With several real-life incidents like IAS officer whose wife filed a case of brutality against him. A song "Sylvia" in Bombay Velvet was named after the Nanavati case, where Sylvia Nanavati was K. M. Nanavati's wife.

Kashyap's work inspired British director Danny Boyle, who has cited Black Friday and Satya as the inspirations for his Academy Award-winning film Slumdog Millionaire (2008). Boyle stated that a chase in one of the opening scenes of Slumdog Millionaire was based on a "12-minute police chase through the crowded Dharavi slum" in Black Friday. He also described Satya's "slick, often mesmerizing" portrayal of the Mumbai underworld, which included gritty and realistic "brutality and urban violence", directly influenced the portrayal of the Mumbai underworld in Slumdog Millionaire.

In recent times, Kashyap has expressed dissatisfaction at the current state of Hindi cinema, citing a "toxic" environment focused on high-grossing films at the expense of creativity. He has relocated from Mumbai to Bengaluru and is exploring opportunities in South Indian cinema.

== Awards and honours ==
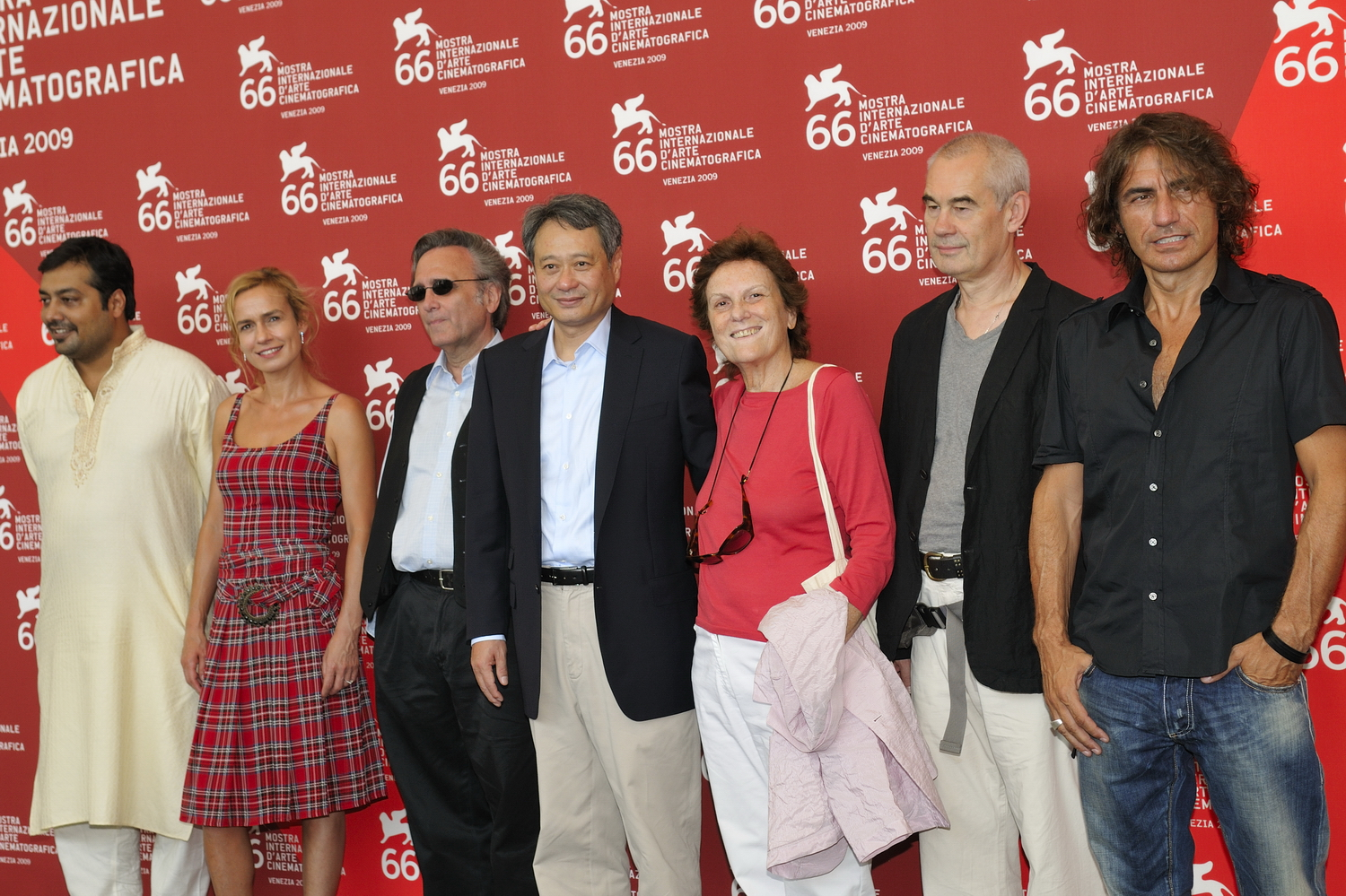
Kashyap (left) along with Sandrine Bonnaire, Joe Dante, Ang Lee, Liliana Cavani, Sergei Bodrov and Luciano Ligabue at the 2009 Venice Film Festival

On 20 May 2013, Kashyap was made a Knight of the Order of Arts and Letters by the French government at 2013 Cannes Film Festival, when India was the guest country of the festival to commemorate 100 years of Indian cinema.

He has also served as one of the jury members at many film festivals including the 2009 Venice Film Festival, 2013 Sundance Film Festival, 13th Marrakech Film Festival, and the 20th Busan International Film Festival. In 2016, Kashyap was awarded with Yash Bharti Award by the Government of Uttar Pradesh for his contribution in the field of cinema.

In 1999, Kashyap shared the Screen Award for Best Screenplay, along with Saurabh Shukla for Satya. The next year, his short film Last Train to Mahakali won the Special Jury Award at the same awards. His feature film debut Black Friday won the Grand Jury Prize at the 3rd Annual Indian Film Festival of Los Angeles, and was a nominee for the Golden Leopard (Best Film) Award at the 57th Locarno International Film Festival.

In 2011, Kashyap shared the Best Story and Best Screenplay Award at the 56th Filmfare Awards with Vikramaditya Motwane for Udaan. The next year he shared the Filmfare Award for Best Dialogue with Zeishan Quadri, Sachin Ladia and Akhilesh Jaiswal for Gangs of Wasseypur at the 58th Filmfare Awards; the film also won the Critics Award Best Movie at the same award show. At the 60th Filmfare Awards, Kashyap won the Filmfare Award for Best Editing with Abhijit Kokate for Queen.

In 2025, he won SIIMA Award for Best Actor in a Negative Role in Tamil film Maharaja.

== Filmography ==
Directed features

- Paanch (2003)
- Black Friday (2004)
- No Smoking (2007)
- Return of Hanuman (2007)
- Mumbai Cutting (2008)
- Dev.D (2009)
- Gulaal (2009)
- That Girl in Yellow Boots (2011)
- Gangs of Wasseypur (2012)
- Gangs of Wasseypur 2 (2012)
- Bombay Talkies (2013)
- Ugly (2014)
- Bombay Velvet (2015)
- Raman Raghav 2.0 (2016)
- Madly (2016)
- Mukkabaaz (2018)
- Lust Stories (2018)
- Manmarziyaan (2018)
- Ghost Stories (2020)
- Choked (2020)
- Dobaaraa (2022)
- Almost Pyaar with DJ Mohabbat (2023)
- Nishaanchi (2025)
- Nishaanchi Part 2 (2025)
- Kennedy (2026)
- Bandar (2026)
