= That Day After Everyday =

- Film poster
- Directed by: Anurag Kashyap
- Written by: Nitin Bhardwaj
- Produced by: Sankalp Acharekar
- Starring: Sandhya Mridul; Radhika Apte; Arannya Kaur; Geetanjali Thapa
- Cinematography: Avinash Arun
- Edited by: Karen Williams
- Music by: Karan Kulkarani
- Production companies: AKFPL; Showhouse Films
- Distributed by: Royal Stag Mega Movie; Large Short Films
- Release date: 29 October 2013
- Running time: 22 minutes
- Country: India
- Language: Hindi

That Day After Everyday is a Hindi short film directed by Anurag Kashyap, written by Nitin Bhardwaj, and produced by Sankalp Acharekar and Omer Haidar. Starring Sandhya Mridul, Radhika Apte, Geetanjali Thapa and Aranya Kaur. The film takes the audience on an emotional ride ending at an action filled crescendo.

== Plot ==
The film deals with eve teasing, a social issue. The film revolves around three women who overcome their helplessness in a bad situation.

== Cast ==
- Sandhya Mridul
- Radhika Apte
- Arannya Kaur
- Geetanjali Thapa
- Mahesh Balraj
- Akash Sinha
- Alok Pandey as Road side Romeo
- Ravi Choudhary
