= DPS MMS scandal =

2004 Indian sex scandal

The DPS MMS Scandal of 2004 was an infamous scandal caused by the unconsented sharing of an explicit video filmed by a student at Delhi Public School, R. K. Puram. The scandal caused a widespread sensation across India.

== The MMS clip ==
In 2004, a male student attending named Hemant Chugh of Delhi Public School, R.K. Puram, shot a video on his phone of a fellow underage female student topless and performing fellatio on him, seemingly without her knowledge. They both were students of 11th standard. The grainy video clip was then shared through MMS and went viral on porn sites.

== Auction bid ==
On 9 October 2004, an article appeared in Delhi-based tabloid Today with the headline, "DPS sex video at baazee.com". The article, written by Anupam Thapa, had the tag "Outrage", was an exclusive story, and claimed "online website goes ahead with the sale of the infamous clip". The article stated, "India's biggest online trading portal baazee.com had listed the said MMS clip under the title 'DPS girls having fun' with the member ID of 27877408. The police upon investigation learnt that one Alice Electronics of Kharagpur, West Bengal had sold 8 copies of said clip since the 27th August 2004." After this story appeared Delhi Police Commissioner took cognizance of the news item and ordered crime branch to register a case and investigate. Crime branch of Delhi Police registered a case at Hauz Khas Police Station naming Anupam Thapa as complainant in the case and treating the entire story as a First Information Report. Avnish Bajaj, the then CEO of the website Baazee.com was summoned by the Delhi High Court for having allowed this clip to be listed for auction under sections 67 and 85 of the I-T Act, 2000. While Section 67 prohibits publishing obscene information in electronic form, Section 85 allows the prosecution of a person responsible for the business of a company over violations. Bajaj who had subsequently sold his company to eBay Pvt. Ltd. contended that mere listing could not be construed as crime under the Information Technology Act 2000.

== Legal consequences ==
This incident caused panic across the country, with many media outlets covering the story. Discussions surrounding the event brought to light the inefficiency of and the need to amend the IT Act, 2000. Following this scandal, and partly due to debates around culpability, liability and prosecution of material on the internet, several key judgements were passed including banning the use of mobile phones in college and school campuses across India.

== In popular culture ==
Hindi films inspired by or based on the 2004 MMS scandal include Dev.D (2009), Love Sex Aur Dhokha (2010), and I Don't Luv U (2013). The crime series Gumrah: End of Innocence also featured an episode on the issue, with Aanchal Munjal playing the lead.

== See also ==
- Ragini MMS, a 2011 Hindi film with a similar theme
