= Choked (film) =

- Film poster
- Directed by: Anurag Kashyap
- Written by: Nihit Bhave
- Produced by: JAR Pictures; Anurag Kashyap; Dhruv Jagasia; Akshay Thakker
- Starring: Saiyami Kher; Roshan Mathew; Amruta Subhash; Rajshri Deshpande
- Cinematography: Sylvester Fonseca
- Edited by: Konark Saxena
- Music by: Rachita Arora
- Production companies: JAR Pictures; Good Bad Films
- Distributed by: Netflix
- Release date: 5 June 2020
- Running time: 114 minutes
- Country: India
- Language: Hindi

Choked: Paisa Bolta Hai (transl. Money talks) is a 2020 Indian Hindi-language drama film directed and co-produced by Anurag Kashyap, written by Nihit Bhave, and jointly produced by Netflix and Good Bad Films (in their debut production). The film stars Saiyami Kher and Roshan Mathew, with Amruta Subhash and Rajshri Deshpande appearing in supporting roles. Set against the backdrop of 2016 Indian banknote demonetisation, the film tells the story of a bank cashier who discovers a stash of cash hidden in her kitchen sink. It released on Netflix on 5 June 2020.

== Plot ==
Sarita Pillai and Sushant Pillai are a married couple living in a lower-middle-class neighborhood in Mumbai, struggling to make ends meet with their young son. Despite their daily hardships, Sarita and Sushant share a musical background, and we learn through a flashback that Sarita froze on stage during a reality singing show when she saw the large audience. This traumatic experience continues to haunt her, causing stress and anxiety.

In the present, Sarita works as a bank teller and is the sole breadwinner of the family, while Sushant frequently faces unemployment and engages in small schemes to make money. The burden of long working hours and the responsibility of managing the household lead to frequent fights and issues between Sarita and Sushant.

Meanwhile, in their apartment building, an unknown man brings a heavy suitcase and hides large cash bundles in a ziploc bag, stuffing it into the bathroom drain. This hidden location causes the water sewage pipe to choke frequently, resulting in unusual noises in the Pillais' kitchen sink. Sarita, waking up one night to get water, discovers the hidden cash in the choked pipe. She is astonished and, after verifying the cash's validity at her bank, uses it to pay off Sushant's debts and indulge in buying high-end items for their home. To explain the sudden influx of cash, she tells Sushant that it came from her mother's fixed deposit.

As Sarita continues to benefit from the hidden cash, their neighbors' struggles and the strained relationship between Sarita and her neighbor downstairs, whom she affectionately calls Tai (meaning sister in Marathi), are also depicted. Sarita shares a friendly yet stressful bond with Tai, and they both rely on the hidden cash to alleviate their financial difficulties.

However, their newfound prosperity comes to an abrupt end when Prime Minister Modi introduces demonetization, banning the use of Rs. 500 and 1000 notes. Sarita and Tai are devastated by the news. Tai, who was preparing for her daughter's wedding, is left in a difficult situation, while Sarita finds herself back in the struggle-filled life she had hoped to escape.

As demonetization takes its toll, Sarita faces angry customers, long hours, and increased stress at the bank. On the other hand, Sushant becomes suspicious of Sarita's behavior, believing she is having an extramarital affair after seeing a video involving Reddy, a man from whom Sushant had borrowed money. Unbeknownst to Sushant, Sarita had used the hidden cash to repay Reddy.

Sarita continues to find solace in the hidden cash when she discovers new currency notes of Rs. 2000 denomination in her kitchen pipe. Excited by this unexpected windfall, she takes extreme measures to hide her secret, even locking up the kitchen and preventing unwanted guests from entering.

Unfortunately, Sarita's cash gathering comes to a halt when thieves hold the bank employees at gunpoint and steal all the money, including the cash she had kept in her purse. Devastated by this loss, she returns home with a heavy heart, feeling that she has once again failed at a crucial moment in her life.

Despite Sushant's reassurances, Sarita decides to hide the truth about the stolen money from him. Little does she know that the police are conducting a criminal investigation into the large sums of Rs. 2000 notes, which were obtained by a local politician through a corrupt bank officer in another city. When questioned by the police, Sarita is taken aback, fearing that her use of the hidden cash will lead to unnecessary trouble for her. However, Sushant intervenes and reveals the existence of the ziploc bags filled with cash. The police then discover that the large bags were brought into the building by an assistant of the local politician, containing newly minted money. Sarita and Sushant's neighbors seize this opportunity and discreetly take large sums of cash for themselves, returning to their homes undetected. The police obtain Sushant's details during their investigation.

One year later, after returning from a trip, the Pillais receive the news that they are entitled to collect 10% of the recovered cash from the police. Excited and curious about the amount they will receive, the movie concludes, leaving the exact sum as a mystery.

== Cast ==
- Saiyami Kher as Sarita Pillai
- Roshan Mathew as Sushant Pillai
- Amruta Subhash as Sharvari Tai
- Rajshri Deshpande as Neeta
- Tawhid Rike Zaman as Neeta's Friend
- Tushar Dalvi as Bank manager
- Upendra Limaye as Reddy
- Milind Phatak as Joshi
- Uday Nene as Dinesh
- Vandana Marathe as Aatya
- Parthveer Shukla as Sameer Pillai
- Adithi Kalkunte as Rutu

== Critical reception ==
On the review aggregator website Rotten Tomatoes, 54% of 13 critics' reviews are positive, with an average rating of 5.7/10.

The Indian Express gave the film a rating of 2 out of 5 stating that, "Choked doesn’t quite live up to its premise: it has some fine elements, but the connective tissue that binds it all together is a weak stretch." Anupama Chopra of Film Companion praised Anurag Kashyap's ability to get good performances from the cast but said that the film fell short from his previous filmography, "Essentially, Choked is Anurag in minor key. There are sporadic moments of stylistic flashiness but mostly the storytelling, like Sarita, is subdued. There is little of the raw, visceral energy we associate with the filmmaker. But as usual, he elicits solid performances from his actors."

Baradwaj Rangan of Film Companion South wrote "The film is rife with symbols, ripe for readings. But when the plot kicks in, it goes all over the place". Rohan Naahar from Hindustan Times gave a mixed response saying, "Choked might not be up there with the filmmaker’s finest, but it’s his most unusual movie since No Smoking — and it most certainly fulfils its duty and performs the Heimlich on a streamer that is gasping for air after a string of back-to-back blunders.."
