= Dev.D =

2009 Indian film by Anurag Kashyap

- Theatrical release poster
- Directed by: Anurag Kashyap
- Written by: Anurag Kashyap; Vikramaditya Motwane
- Based on: Devdas by Sharat Chandra Chattopadhyay
- Produced by: Ronnie Screwvala
- Starring: Abhay Deol; Mahie Gill; Kalki Koechlin
- Cinematography: Rajeev Ravi
- Edited by: Aarti Bajaj
- Music by: Amit Trivedi
- Production companies: UTV Spotboy; Bindass
- Distributed by: UTV Motion Pictures
- Release date: 6 February 2009
- Running time: 144 minutes
- Country: India
- Language: Hindi
- Budget: ₹11 crore
- Box office: ₹20.82 crore

Dev.D is a 2009 Indian Hindi-language romantic drama film written and directed by Anurag Kashyap. It is a modern-day adaptation of Sarat Chandra Chattopadhyay's 1917 Bengali novel, Devdas. The film stars Abhay Deol, Mahie Gill and Kalki Koechlin in lead roles. The film is set in modern-day Punjab and Delhi, and follows Devendra Singh "Dev" Dhillon (Abhay Deol), a privileged young man who descends into alcohol and drug addiction after a failed relationship with his childhood love Parminder "Paro" Kaur (Mahie Gill), eventually forming an unexpected bond with Chanda (Kalki Koechlin), an escort navigating her own emotional trauma.

The idea for Dev.D was developed by Anurag Kashyap and Abhay Deol, drawing on real-life incidents, including the 2004 Delhi Public School MMS scandal and a high-profile hit-and-run case. Principal photography took place in Delhi and Punjab, with visually distinct palettes for each character's arc.

The film was released on 6 February 2009 to strong critical acclaim for its unconventional storytelling, visual style, and music. It had a modest box office performance, earning ₹21.5 crore domestically against a small budget, and was declared a hit. Over time, Dev.D attained cult status and is now considered a landmark in Indian independent cinema. A tie-in mobile video game based on the film was released by UTV Indiagames.

The film's soundtrack was composed by Amit Trivedi and featured 18 songs spanning rock, folk, jazz, and electronic influences. It was praised for its innovation and seamless integration with the narrative. Trivedi received the National Film Award For The Best Music Direction and the Filmfare Award for Best Music Director for his work on the album.

== Plot ==
The film is structured into three distinct segments, each focusing on the perspective of one of the three central characters.

Paro

Paro is a young, idealistic middle-class girl raised in Punjab who is deeply in love with her childhood sweetheart, Dev, the son of a wealthy businessman. Dev, however, routinely takes her affection for granted, developing into a spoiled, arrogant, and lazy young man. His behavior prompts his father to send him to London to finish his education. Though separated by distance, Paro's devotion deepens, while Dev grows increasingly entitled and egotistical. Upon completing his studies, Dev returns to Chandigarh, where the two rekindle their romance. The relationship shatters when Dev unthinkingly believes scandalous, unverified rumors regarding Paro's reputation and sexual history. Shocked by his blatant chauvinism and hypocrisy, Paro denounces him. When Dev continues to judge and insult her, she cuts ties with him and rashly agrees to an arranged marriage with a man named Bhavan. On her wedding day, Dev discovers the rumors were entirely fabricated, but his stubborn ego prevents him from apologizing. He watches her marry Bhavan before collapsing in a drunken stupor.

Chanda

Leni is a college student in Delhi of mixed European descent. Her life is upended when a sexual encounter with her older boyfriend is secretly filmed and leaked online, resulting in a highly publicized MMS sex scandal. Devastated by the public shame, her father commits suicide, and Leni is sent by her mother to live in her late father's conservative ancestral village. Unable to endure the isolation and constant ridicule, she returns to Delhi. She begins balancing her daytime university studies with a nocturnal life as a high-class sex worker, adopting the pseudonym "Chanda" after watching a television broadcast of the film Devdas. Her distinct looks make her a highly sought-after, premium commodity for elite clients, allowing her to carve out financial independence and personal dignity. Her path crosses with the narrative when a heavily intoxicated, semi-conscious Dev is brought to her room as a client. Despite Dev's lingering obsession with Paro, Chanda finds herself falling in love with him.

Dev D

Tormented by Paro's marriage, Dev spirals into a destructive pattern of severe alcohol and drug abuse. During a heavy drinking binge, he meets a cynical pimp named Chunni, who guides him directly to Chanda's brothel. While Dev finds temporary solace in Chanda's company, he remains unable to purge Paro from his mind. In a drug-induced haze, he makes a erratic late-night phone call to Paro's husband, prompting a concerned Paro to track him down at his dilapidated lodge. Though she demonstrates her enduring care by cleaning his room, she firmly rejects his physical advances. The meeting ends bitterly when Dev confesses his love, only for Paro to command him to move on with his life before returning to her husband.

Dev initially resolves to commit to Chanda, and the two begin falling in love. However, his deep-seated prejudices regarding her sex work catch up to him, causing him to abandon her. He plunges back into a lethal lifestyle of narcotics and reckless behavior, eventually causing a horrific drunk driving accident that kills seven people. The news causes his ailing father to die of shock. Months later, hit by absolute rock bottom, a broken Dev attempts to salvage his life. He tracks down Chanda once again, and with her forgiveness and support, sets out to rehabilitate himself and start entirely afresh.

== Cultural references ==
- Kalki's character is a modern adaptation of Chandramukhi, who was most recently played by Madhuri Dixit in Sanjay Leela Bhansali's Devdas. In the film, the young Leni is shown to be a fan of Madhuri's, listening to the songs of Chandramukhi. When she takes up prostitution as profession, she adopts the name Chandramukhi or Chanda, in honor of the character.
- Chanda's backstory in which she gets embroiled in an MMS scandal while in school is a reference to a similar scandal that took place at Delhi Public School, R.K. Puram in 2004.
- Later in the film, when Dev is depressed after losing both Paro and Chanda, he is driving his new BMW while heavily drunk. This is a reference to the Sanjeev Nanda BMW hit-and-run case in 1999.

== Cast ==
- Abhay Deol as Devendra Singh "Dev" Dhillon
- Mahie Gill as Parminder "Paro" Kaur
- Kalki Koechlin as Leni/Chandramukhi (Chanda)
- Dibyendu Bhattacharya as Chunni Lal
- Parakh Madan as Rasika Singh
- Gurkirtan as Satpal Singh Dhillon 'Sattu' (Dev's father)
- Satwant Kaur as Kaushalya Dhillon (Dev's mother)
- Shena Gamat as Welcome Hotel Owner
- Binnu Dhillon as Dwij Singh Dhillon (Dev's brother)
- Kuldeep Sharma as Manager Uncle (Paro's father)
- Sanjay Kumar as Leni's father
- Helen Jones as Leni's mother
- Asim Sharma as Bhuvan Singh (Paro's husband and Rasika's brother)
- Naveen Kaushik as Bimal Barua (Dhillon's Lawyer)
- Aekansh Vats as Junior Dev
- Sasha Shetty as Junior Paro
- Anjum Batra as Sunil
- Ashu Sharma as Canadian boy
- Nawazuddin Siddiqui as band singer in the song "Emotional Attyachar"
- Nitin Chainpuri as Band singer in the song "Emotional Attyachar"
  - Chainpuri resembles such a strong likelihood to actor-comedian Sunil Grover in the music video that people initially mistook him to be Grover, who, however, denied his involvement in the film
- Jimi the quiff as Mafia Don
- Sinbad Phgura as Mafia Don
- Ammo Too Sweet as Mafia Don
- Anurag Kashyap as Chanda's customer

== Production ==
=== Development ===
The original idea of film was suggested by Abhay Deol to Anurag Kashyap, who then worked on the script along with Vikramaditya Motwane, using "news headlines about Generation X" to give a youth feel. Dev.D was produced by Ronnie Screwvala and shot in places including Paharganj in central Delhi. For the scenes where Dev is high, British director Danny Boyle suggested the use of a still camera as Kashyap did not have the budget for special effects.

Kashyap did not want another remake of any of the nine film versions titled Devdas; Motwane had been part of the last known version, the 2002 adaptation directed by his former mentor Sanjay Leela Bhansali, on which he was an assistant. He wanted to make his own version of Devdas to reflect the original novel but through 2008 mores, with the lead character of Devdas as a debauching, hypocritical sensualist, who is self-destructive without knowing it; Motwane contributed his expertise from the 2002 adaptation to the script. Talking about the story and his role as Dev, Abhay Deol told Radio Sargam, "The story is very much from the book which I've read in English. I have played the character according to my interpretation of the book. His character was contemporary, he was quite urban in many ways, he's misplaced in the surrounding and has a spoilt, obsessive and addictive personality."

=== Initial delays ===
After the box office disaster of Kashyap's No Smoking, it was rumoured that United Television (UTV) had backed out of the director's next project, Dev.D, starring Abhay Deol. But, according to sources, UTV had signed Abhay for three projects and the actor had blocked dates from November 2007 to March 2008 for Kashyap's film, as the idea was to wrap up the film in one schedule. When Dev.D hit initial snags and was stalled, it was rumoured that UTV had backed out. At that time, the director denied these rumours. He explained the delay by saying that he was still looking out for his Chandramukhi and had locked in Abhay and newcomer Mahi Gill. It was further delayed as he took more time to find an actress suitable for the role of Chandramukhi, which he eventually found with Kalki Koechlin, who was one of the last to be auditioned. Despite being her debut, Kalki received praise for the performance.

== Release and reception ==
Dev.D premiered at the 2010 Palm Springs International Film Festival.

=== Box office ===
Dev.D had opening day collection of Rs 15 million. The movie picked up in box office soon and recovered its budget of Rs 60 million in a few weeks. The net collection in its first four weeks was nearly Rs 150 million. Dev.D crossed added another 3 million in week 6. The film's final domestic gross was Rs 215.0 million with distributor share of Rs 65.5 million. The film was declared a 'Hit'.

=== Critical response ===
Reviews to the film were positive. Rony D'Costa of Box Office India gave it 4 stars out of 5, stating "Missing Dev.D would be an 'Emotional Attyachar' to oneself." Raja Sen of Rediff.com gave Dev.D 3.5/5, calling it a 'fantastic visual ride', and ranked it No 2 in his list of the best movies of 2009. Times of India reviewer Nikhat Kazmi termed the film a "brilliant breakthrough for Bollywood" and rated it 5/5. Shubhra Gupta of Indian Express praised the performance of Abhay Deol and the movie overall. Hindustan Times praised the film for its "slick style and adventurous interpretation that pushes the boundaries of Hindi cinema" and rating it as 3.5/5. Noyon Jyoti Parasara of AOL India was "completely bowled out by the movie" and stated, "go and watch Dev.D and be blown away by a sample of what Anurag Kashyap is capable of as a director. Shahrukh Khan praised Abhay Deol's efforts and said that Abhay is contributing to the new era of Indian film industry."

Several reviewers have highlighted the unconventional visual aesthetic and soundtrack. The film has also been noted for its portrayal of modern toxic masculinity through the protagonist Dev, years before it was portrayed in other high-profile Indian films such as Animal and Arjun Reddy.

== Accolades ==
Award	Date of the ceremony	Category	Recipients	Result	Ref.
V. Shantaram Awards	18 November 2009	Best Debut Artiste in a Leading Role	Kalki Koechlin	Nominated	
Asia Pacific Screen Awards	26 November 2009	Best Director	Anurag Kashyap	Nominated	
Producers Guild Film Awards	8 January 2010	Best Actress in a Supporting Role	Kalki Koechlin	Nominated	
Stardust Awards	17 January 2010	Best Film – Drama	Dev.D	Nominated	
Stardust Awards	17 January 2010	Searchlight Award for Best Actor	Abhay Deol	Nominated	
Stardust Awards	17 January 2010	Searchlight Award for Best Actress	Mahie Gill	Nominated	
Stardust Awards	17 January 2010	Breakthrough Performance – Female	Kalki Koechlin	Nominated	
Screen Awards	23 January 2010	Best Film	Dev.D	Nominated	
Screen Awards	23 January 2010	Best Director	Anurag Kashyap	Nominated	
Screen Awards	23 January 2010	Best Actor (Popular Choice)	Abhay Deol	Nominated	
Screen Awards	23 January 2010	Best Female Debut	Kalki Koechlin	Nominated	
Screen Awards	23 January 2010	Best Female Debut	Mahie Gill	Won	
Screen Awards	23 January 2010	Best Screenplay	Anurag Kashyap and Vikramaditya Motwane	Nominated	
Screen Awards	23 January 2010	Best Dialogue	Anurag Kashyap and Vikramaditya Motwane	Nominated	
Screen Awards	23 January 2010	Best Cinematography	Rajeev Ravi	Won	
Screen Awards	23 January 2010	Best Background Music	Amit Trivedi	Won	
Screen Awards	23 January 2010	Best Art Direction	Helen Jones and Sukanta Panigrahi	Nominated	
Screen Awards	23 January 2010	Best Editing	Aarti Bajaj	Nominated	
Screen Awards	23 January 2010	Best Sound Design	Allwyn Rego and Sanjay Maurya	Won	
Bollywood Hungama Surfers Choice Movie Awards	29 January 2010	Best Female Debut	Mahie Gill (tied with Shruti Haasan for Luck)	Won	
Mirchi Music Awards	10 February 2010	Upcoming Lyricist of The Year	Amitabh Bhattacharya for "Emosanal Attyachar (Brass Band Version)"	Won	
Mirchi Music Awards	10 February 2010	Upcoming Female Vocalist of the Year	Aditi Singh Sharma for "Yahi Meri Zindagi"	Won	
Filmfare Awards	27 February 2010	Best Film	Dev.D	Nominated	
Filmfare Awards	27 February 2010	Best Director	Anurag Kashyap	Nominated	
Filmfare Awards	27 February 2010	Best Actress (Critics)	Mahie Gill	Won	
Filmfare Awards	27 February 2010	Best Supporting Actress	Kalki Koechlin	Won	
Filmfare Awards	27 February 2010	Best Music Director	Amit Trivedi	Nominated	
Filmfare Awards	27 February 2010	R. D. Burman Award for New Music Talent	Amit Trivedi	Won	
Filmfare Awards	27 February 2010	Best Background Score	Amit Trivedi	Won	
Filmfare Awards	27 February 2010	Best Cinematography	Rajeev Ravi	Won	
Filmfare Awards	27 February 2010	Best Production Design	Helen Jones & Sukanta Panigrahi	Won	
International Indian Film Academy Awards	3–5 June 2010	Best Film	Dev.D	Nominated	
International Indian Film Academy Awards	3–5 June 2010	Best Director	Anurag Kashyap	Nominated	
International Indian Film Academy Awards	3–5 June 2010	Best Actress	Mahie Gill	Nominated	
International Indian Film Academy Awards	3–5 June 2010	Best Supporting Actress	Kalki Koechlin	Nominated	
International Indian Film Academy Awards	3–5 June 2010	Star Debut of the Year – Female	Mahie Gill (tied with Jacqueline Fernandez for Aladin)	Won	
International Indian Film Academy Awards	3–5 June 2010	Best Music Director	Amit Trivedi	Nominated	
International Indian Film Academy Awards	3–5 June 2010	Best Lyricist	Amitabh Bhattacharya for "Emosanal Attyachar"	Nominated	
International Indian Film Academy Awards	3–5 June 2010	Best Story	Anurag Kashyap and Vikramaditya Motwane	Nominated	
Annual Central European Bollywood Awards	10 October 2010	Best Film	Dev.D	Nominated	
Annual Central European Bollywood Awards	10 October 2010	Best Director	Anurag Kashyap	Nominated	
Annual Central European Bollywood Awards	10 October 2010	Best Breakthrough – Female	Kalki Koechlin	Nominated	
Annual Central European Bollywood Awards	10 October 2010	Best Breakthrough – Female	Mahie Gill	Nominated	
Annual Central European Bollywood Awards	10 October 2010	Best Music Director	Amit Trivedi	Nominated	
Annual Central European Bollywood Awards	10 October 2010	Best Story	Anurag Kashyap and Vikramaditya Motwane	Nominated	
Annual Central European Bollywood Awards	10 October 2010	Best Cinematography	Rajeev Ravi	Nominated	
Annual Central European Bollywood Awards	10 October 2010	Best Editing	Aarti Bajaj	Nominated	
Annual Central European Bollywood Awards	10 October 2010	Best Art Direction	Helen Jones & Sukanta Panigrahi	Nominated	
Annual Central European Bollywood Awards	10 October 2010	Best Costume Design	Shubhra Gupta	Nominated	
National Film Awards	22 October 2010	Best Music Direction	Amit Trivedi	Won	

== Soundtrack ==
Dev.D has 18 tracks by artiste Amit Trivedi. The songs were written by Amitabh Bhattacharya, Shellee, Anusha Mani, and Shruti Pathak. Released on 31 December under T-Series, he specifically reports that there are two special Punjabi tracks, one which is raw Punjabi and the other with a street band baaja flavor to it. He also reports two romantic Haryanvi folk tracks, apart from a hard rock song, world music, an Awadhi number and a song with 1970s-80s pop touch to it. The soundtrack received overwhelmingly positive reviews. Critic Joginder Tuteja said, "Chuck the very thought around whether this album will do well commercially or not; it is an exemplary piece of work and that's what that matters most." Rahul Bhatia, critic of Hindustan Times fame, said "Each part of each song in this album is special & gives a great impact on audience."

The song "O Pardesi" was replicated using a cycle as a Sprite commercial quotient and is available on YouTube with 140K+ views in the first 24 hours. The song "Emosanal Attyachaar" has become a catch phrase for many Indian youth. Nikhil Taneja of Hindustan Times noted that the song was "singularly responsible for driving audiences to the theater to watch a movie."
