= Screen Award Special Jury Award =

Film award in India

The Screen Award Special Jury Award is a special award conducted by the Star Screen Awards to recognise a great performance by an artist in the previous year. The winners are listed below:-

Year	Artist	Film
1995	Govinda	Coolie No. 1
1997	Aditya Narayan	Masoom (1996 film) for song "Chhota Baccha Jaan Ke"
1999	J. D. Chakravarthy	Satya
2000	Mahesh Manjrekar	Astitva and Nidaan
2002	Akshaye Khanna	Dil Chahta Hai
2004	Anu Malik	LOC Kargil
2007	Darsheel Safary	Taare Zameen Par (Like Stars on Earth)
2014	Anand Gandhi	Ship Of Theseus

== See also ==
- Star Screen Awards
- Bollywood
- Cinema of India
