= 1999 Delhi hit-and-run case =

Car crash killing six people in Delhi, India

The 1999 Delhi hit-and-run case was a drunken driving incident, where six people, including three police officers were killed by a speeding BMW E38 in the Lodhi Colony area of Delhi, India, on 10 January 1999. After following trails of the engine oil, police found the BMW at 50 Golf Links, the residence of Rajeev Gupta. It was then revealed that Sanjeev Nanda, grandson of Indian Navy Chief and son of Indian arms dealer Suresh Nanda was driving the car after returning from a party with Siddhartha Gupta (son of Rajeev Gupta), and Manik Kapoor.

While Nanda and several related parties were initially acquitted and released in a trial in 1999, he was later found guilty in 2008 and sentenced to two years in prison, which was reduced to time served, a large fine, and two years of community service by the Indian Supreme Court in 2012. The case attracted media attention, and was viewed by India Today as "a test of the judicial system's ability to take on the powerful".

== Hit-and-run case ==
In the early morning of 10 January 1999, Sanjeev Nanda was returning from a late night party in Gurgaon with some friends.

Nanda had reportedly been instructed by his parents not to drive that night, but was driving anyway. There was a police checkpoint on Lodhi Road and it appears that the constable may have challenged the car, though it is also possible that the car was going so fast that it was out of control. Sanjeev's BMW crashed through all the people at the police checkpoint, immediately killing two constables and two others. Another policeman and another bystander died later in hospital. The seventh victim survived.

After running through the policemen, he allegedly stopped the car to check the damage, saw people under the car, and according to the prosecution, at this point a co-passenger said: "Let's go," and they quickly drove away. The car was then driven to a house in Golf Links, New Delhi, where a watchman and driver were instructed to clean the bumpers and bonnet of the car. Subsequently, the police charged these three with destroying evidence. A few days later, a witness came forward to describe the scene. At the time of the crash, he was on his way to the railway station.

== NDTV sting operation ==
Defence lawyers were caught on camera offering money to a witness in an NDTV sting operation, and as a result, the Delhi High Court barred them from practice for four months.

== Investigation ==
The vehicle's broken registration plate was found on the scene the next morning. Preliminary investigations revealed that the car would have been going at 140 km/h when it hit the victims.

Within a few hours of the incident, Inspector Jagdish Pandey of the Police Control Room of Delhi Police traced the car by trailing the oil leak to the grade from the spot of the accident. They found the one-month-old car, purchased in his sister Sonali Nanda's name, with foreign number plates, which had not been registered in India. Attempts to clean it were still in progress. Nanda and his friends were arrested, but his clothes, and those of the others who helped clean the car, were never found. Nanda and his friends were charged with culpable homicide in court.

== Re-trial ==
The case went up for re-trial and was tried on a fast-track basis. On 2 September 2008, Nanda was convicted by a Delhi court for killing six people. On 3 August 2012 the Supreme Court reduced his prison sentence to the two years he had already spent in prison, but the court added a large fine, and sentenced Nanda to do community service for two years.

== In popular culture ==
The case inspired the Bollywood movie Jolly LLB (2013) starring Arshad Warsi and Boman Irani, the Tollywood movie Sapthagiri LLB (2017) starring Saptagiri and Sai Kumar, and the Kollywood movie Manithan.
