= Gangs of Wasseypur (soundtrack) =

Soundtrack album by Sneha Khanwalkar and Piyush Mishra
- Released: 1 June 2012
- Recorded: 2010–2012
- Genre: Feature film soundtrack
- Length: 56:12
- Language: Hindi
- Label: T-Series

Sneha Khanwalkar chronology
Bheja Fry 2 (2011)	Gangs of Wasseypur (soundtrack) (2012)	Gangs of Wasseypur – Part 2 (2012)

Piyush Mishra chronology
Lahore (2010)	Gangs of Wasseypur – Part 1 (2012)	Gangs of Wasseypur – Part 2 (2012)

Gangs of Wasseypur (Original Motion Picture Soundtrack) is the soundtrack album to the 2012 film of the same name, which is the first of a two-part film directed by Anurag Kashyap. The album featured 14 songs composed by Sneha Khanwalkar and Piyush Mishra, with lyrics written by Mishra and Varun Grover.

When first planned as a single film, they composed around 27 songs, before the film being split into two parts. The composition and recording of the film's soundtrack took nearly two years. The album featured heavy influences of Bihar folk and chutney music with Khanwalkar composing and curating the tunes in Bihar to extensively research on the local music. G. V. Prakash Kumar scored the background music, in his Hindi film debut.

The soundtrack was released under the T-Series label on 1 June 2012 at a unique road procession event in place of a traditional music launch. The album received positive reviews from critics, appreciating the instrumentation, soundscape and variety of vocals, and also being unconventional from mainstream Hindi film soundtracks. Khanwalkar received nominations from various ceremonies at Filmfare, IIFA, Screen and Producers Guild for her work in the film and its sequel.

== Background ==
The soundtrack to Gangs of Wasseypur featured 27 songs. Khanwalkar added that she had composed 35–40 songs but had purposefully set aside 6–7 songs as she refrained to forcefully fit them in the film. In an interview to Rediff.com, she added "I can do thousands of songs for a film like GOW (laughs). I will exhaust myself but I don't think my bank of songs will ever get exhausted. I have a lot of ideas [...] A lot of musicians that I have worked with will agree that Wasseypur is not an album; it is a project for all of us." However, the album was split up according to the film's release, which resulted in Part 1 featuring 14 songs.

== Production and composition ==
Khanwalkar was approached by Kashyap when she finished composing for Love Sex Aur Dhokha (2010). Kashyap recalled that he liked her compositions for Oye Lucky! Lucky Oye! (2008) due to its unique voices, which led to her involvement in the film. As he heard numerous Bihari songs, Kashyap provided her the research material and instructed her that he wanted the music to be like Bihar folk, a genre unheard in mainstream Hindi films, and which Khanwalkar had no idea of.

She travelled to All India Radio station in Patna as "it is the safest place to be if you want to get the taste of local music." Throughout the extensive research of the film's music, she spent four months in and around Bihar—Patna, Darbhanga, Muzaffarpur, Gaya—while also travelling to Ranchi and Dhanbad in Jharkhand and Varanasi in Uttar Pradesh. Khanwalkar would record the instrumentation and vocals and return to Mumbai, where she would mix and master those samples. For the song "Hunter", she requested Kashyap to travel to Trinidad and Tobago, to which he permitted. She recorded the song in 45 days. Describing the recording process, Khanwalkar revealed that she was fascinated on chutney music, adding "You won't believe it but I thought of going to Trinidad and making a career doing chutney (music) for some time. I was very attracted to these songs, and I wanted to use it in one of my movies."

Throughout the composition process, Kashyap gave her creative freedom while also providing some inputs and minor tweaking to some songs to make them better. During her visit to Bihar and Jharkhand, she met several locals which "got a sense of the sounds around [her]" and randomly met singers and recorded the sounds before fine-tuning them and discussed with the lyricists and musicians to play for Kashyap. Piyush Mishra composed the soundtrack and wrote lyrics for few songs, including some for his compositions.

Gangs of Wasseypur marked the Hindi debut of Tamil film composer G. V. Prakash Kumar, who composed the background score. Being fascinated on the way Kashyap shot the film, Prakash wanted to treat the score similar to The Godfather (1972) by representing the 1980s and 1990s time period through music. During the timeline change, Prakash utilized trumpets and live rock guitars that blends with the era. Kashyap further travelled to Chennai to help Prakash in the music corrections and spent a day at his studio. Speaking to Baradwaj Rangan of Film Companion South, Prakash added "One thing I love about him is how much he believed in me and trusted in my music; he flew down only because he respected my work and wanted to tell me in person."

== Release ==
The soundtrack to Part 1 was first made available for Airtel India customers for ten days since 21 May 2012. The soundtrack was released exclusively through iTunes on 31 May 2012 and other digital platforms and CDs on 1 June 2012. Instead of a traditional music launch event in five-star hotels, the team came up with an idea of a road-show event named Wasseypur Music Express; this procession was held at the streets of Mumbai, where Manoj Bajpayee, Huma Qureshi and Anurag Kashyap drove a jeep around the suburbs and the team danced on the streets wearing red gamuchas and has been making public appearances in them ever since.

== Reception ==
Raja Sen of Rediff.com gave a 5-star rating to the soundtrack calling it a "a strikingly flavourful and headily authentic collection of quirky music [...] clearly Kashyap and Khanwalkar have prioritised authenticity and flavour above all else, and for this—and the very scale of the album's ambition—they must be commended." Purva Desai of The Times of India said "The music is brilliant and this album deserves all the praises. the music is brilliant and this album deserves all the praises. Anurag Kashyap’s love for music is apparent in this album and it never once disappoints. The album has so many beautiful songs that it makes it hard to choose. However, O Womaniya, Jiya Tu and Manmauji certainly stand out. The music is unconventional and will linger for a long time to come."

Joginder Tuteja of Bollywood Hungama rated 2 out of 5, stating that "Despite it being song-heavy, it doesn't quite boast of tracks that have a long lasting appeal." Rohit Vats of News18 rated 3.5 out of 5 and wrote "Gangs of Wasseypur is a successful album when it comes to catching the popular imagination. This may not appeal much to the lovers of underground music, but it has got some addictive tunes. Probably the music fails to cater to all sections of the society but the fearless experimentations by Sneha Khanwalkar makes it better than most of the contemporary music albums. Gangs of Wasseypur is a fine purchase by any standard." Vipin Nair of Music Aloud rated 8.5 out of 10 and wrote "Yet another proof of Sneha Khanwalkar’s penchant for out-of-the-ordinary sounds that are not always hummable, but effective nevertheless." Karthik Srinivasan of Milliblog called "Gangs of Wasseypur is one of the most original and imaginative soundtracks in recent times."

== Track listing ==
Gangs of Wasseypur – Part 1 (Original Motion Picture Soundtrack) track listing
No.	Title	Lyrics	Music	Singer(s)	Length
1.	"Jiya Tu"	Varun Grover	Sneha Khanwalkar	Manoj Tiwari	5:19
2.	"Ik Bagal"	Piyush Mishra	Piyush Mishra	Piyush Mishra	5:28
3.	"Bhoos"	Varun Grover	Sneha Khanwalkar	Manish Tipu, Bhupesh Singh	5:09
4.	"Keh Ke Lunga"	Piyush Mishra	Sneha Khanwalkar	Amit Trivedi, Sneha Khanwalkar	4:47
5.	"O Womaniya Live"	Varun Grover	Sneha Khanwalkar	Khusboo Raaj, Rekha Jha	4:49
6.	"Hunter"	Varun Grover	Sneha Khanwalkar	Vedesh Sokoo, Rajneesh, Munna, Shyamoo	4:17
7.	"Humni Ke Chhodi Ke"	Varun Grover	Sneha Khanwalkar	Deepak Thakur	4:17
8.	"Loonga Loonga"	Piyush Mishra	Piyush Mishra	Ranjeet Kumar Baal Party, Akshay Verma	2:52
9.	"Manmauji"	Piyush Mishra	Piyush Mishra	Usri Banerjee	2:53
10.	"Womaniya"	Varun Grover	Sneha Khanwalkar	Khusboo Raaj, Rekha Jha	5:22
11.	"Aey Jawano"	Varun Grover	Sneha Khanwalkar	Ranjeet Kumar Baal Party	1:54
12.	"Soona Kar Ke Gharwa"	Varun Grover	Sneha Khanwalkar	Sujeet	2:01
13.	"Tain Tain To To"	Varun Grover	Sneha Khanwalkar	Sneha Khanwalkar	3:59
14.	"Bhaiyaa"	Varun Grover	Sneha Khanwalkar	The Mushahar of Sundarpur	3:06
Total length:					56:12

== Awards and nominations ==
Accolades for Gangs of Wasseypur – Part 1 (Original Motion Picture Soundtrack)
Award	Date of ceremony (Note: Each date is linked to the article about the awards held that year, wherever possible.)	Category	Recipients	Result	Ref.
Apsara Film & Television Producers Guild Awards (Note: Also known as Star Guild Awards.)	16 February 2013	Best Music Director	Sneha Khanwalkar (Note: Also for the Gangs of Wasseypur – Part 2.)	Nominated	
Filmfare Awards	20 January 2013	Best Music Director	Sneha Khanwalkar	Nominated	
International Indian Film Academy Awards	6 July 2013	Best Music Director	Sneha Khanwalkar	Nominated	
Screen Awards	12 January 2013	Best Music Director	Sneha Khanwalkar	Nominated	
