= Gangs of Wasseypur 2 (soundtrack) =

Gangs of Wasseypur II (Original Motion Picture Soundtrack)

Soundtrack album by Sneha Khanwalkar and Piyush Mishra
- Released: 11 July 2012
- Recorded: 2010–2012
- Genre: Feature film soundtrack
- Length: 52:16
- Language: Hindi
- Label: T-Series

Sneha Khanwalkar chronology
Gangs of Wasseypur – Part 1 (2012)	Gangs of Wasseypur II (Original Motion Picture Soundtrack) (2012)	Dishkiyaoon (2014)

Piyush Mishra chronology
Gangs of Wasseypur (2012)	Gangs of Wasseypur – Part 2 (2012)	Jalpari: The Desert Mermaid (2012)

Gangs of Wasseypur II (Original Motion Picture Soundtrack) is the soundtrack album to the 2012 film of the same name which is the second of a two-part film directed by Anurag Kashyap.

When initially planned as a single film, musicians Sneha Khanwalkar and Piyush Mishra had composed around 27 songs; but as the film was split up into two parts, the first film's soundtrack had 14 songs, while the remainder made its way for the sequel. The musical palette consisted of Bihari folk music, which Khanwalkar curated on recording the sounds in Bihar and across parts of North and Central India. The composition process took more than two years.

The soundtrack to Gangs of Wasseypur 2 was released on 11 July 2012, to positive reviews. Although critics noted the heavy influences of the first film's soundtrack, they praised the distinctive and unconventional appeal of the film's music. Khanwalkar received nominations from various ceremonies at Filmfare, IIFA, Screen and Producers Guild for her work in the film and the predecessor.

== Background ==
Gangs of Wasseypur initially had 27 songs composed by Sneha Khanwalkar and Piyush Mishra, which was split up according to the film's release. Khanwalkar had curated the songs being inspired by Bihar folk and chutney music, blending the two distinctive genres. She travelled across Bihar, Jharkhand and Uttar Pradesh to capture the essence of the folk music in these places, and spent four months there, recording various sounds. During this period, she also collaborated with locals to record the songs. The composition for both parts of the films, took more than two years.

The track "Chhi Chha Ledar" was sung by 16-year-old Durga. She came across Khanwalkar, when she recorded an album song directed by Anand Surapur at his office and impressed by her vocals and texture, she offered her to sing one of the songs for the film. She recorded the song "Chhi Chha Ledar" under the guidance of Khanwalkar and it took her 4–5 days to record the film. Another track "Keh Ke Loonga" was re-used from the first part, which was performed by Piyush Bhatnagar.

G. V. Prakash Kumar composed the film score, after he previously did the same for the predecessor. His inspiration for the score came from The Godfather (1972), where he utilized trumpets for the 1980s period and live rock guitars for the 1990s period. It was recorded at Prakash's Divine Labs studio in Chennai.

== Release ==
T-Series released the 13-song soundtrack album to Gangs of Wasseypur 2 on 11 July 2012.

== Reception ==
A reviewer from IANS rated the soundtrack 4 out of 5 stating "The rustic touch is still very much there, but the canvas of the music is much larger and explosive." Joginder Tuteja of Bollywood Hungama rated 3 out of 5 stating "Though the music isn't for an out and out massy outing, there are quite a few pieces that should aid the narrative in moving forward and create an overall cinematic appeal." Raja Sen of Rediff.com wrote "Composer Sneha Khanwalkar's super original songs—Kaala Re is this film's big, big winner—is overshadowed by familiar songs from our past." Devesh Sharma of Filmfare wrote "One of the best parts of GOW 1 was its music. Not that the talents of Sneha Khanwalkar and GV Prakash dwindled all of a sudden, but songs like Womaniya and Jiyo re Bihar ke lala added a distinct flavour to GOW 1. Kaala rey adds good dramatic effect to part 2 but it's nowhere near as effective as its preceding compositions." Karthik Srinivasan of Milliblog wrote "The soundtrack of Gangs of Wasseypur 2 seems more aligned to Sneha’s Sound Trippin work than the earlier soundtrack, but is still wonderfully eclectic." Vipin Nair of Music Aloud rated 8 out of 10 and wrote "Equally offbeat, equally wacky, but a tad less entertaining."

== Track listing ==
Gangs of Wasseypur 2 (Original Motion Picture Soundtrack) track listing
No.	Title	Lyrics	Music	Singer(s)	Length
1.	"Chhi Chha Ledar"	Varun Grover	Sneha Khanwalkar	Durga	4:08
2.	"Kaala Rey"	Varun Grover	Sneha Khanwalkar	Sneha Khanwalkar	5:09
3.	"Electric Piya"	Piyush Mishra	Piyush Mishra	Rasika D Rani	4:35
4.	"Bahut Khoob"	Piyush Mishra	Sneha Khanwalkar	Kids of Musahar Village	2:00
5.	"Taar Bijli"	Varun Grover	Sneha Khanwalkar	Sharda Sinha	6:52
6.	"Aabroo"	Varun Grover	Piyush Mishra	Piyush Mishra, Bhupesh Singh	4:34
7.	"Perpendicular" (Theme)		Sneha Khanwalkar	Instrumental	1:54
8.	"Moora"	Varun Grover	Sneha Khanwalkar	Sneha Khanwalkar, Robbie Styles	5:12
9.	"Tunya"	Piyush Mishra	Piyush Mishra	Bulbultarang With Baal Party	1:22
10.	"Bahut Khoob" (8 Bit)	Piyush Mishra	Sneha Khanwalkar	Kids of Musahar Village	2:55
11.	"Electric Piya" (Fused)	Piyush Mishra	Piyush Mishra	Rasika D Rani	4:27
12.	"Moora" (Morning)	Varun Grover	Sneha Khanwalkar	Deepak Thakur	5:36
13.	"Keh Ke Loonga"	Varun Grover	Sneha Khanwalkar	Piyush Bhatnagar	3:26
Total length:					52:16

== Awards and nominations ==
Accolades for Gangs of Wasseypur – Part 2 (Original Motion Picture Soundtrack)
Award	Date of ceremony (Note: Each date is linked to the article about the awards held that year, wherever possible.)	Category	Recipients	Result	Ref
Apsara Film & Television Producers Guild Awards (Note: Also known as Star Guild Awards.)	16 February 2013	Best Music Director	Sneha Khanwalkar (Note: Also for the Gangs of Wasseypur.)	Nominated	
Filmfare Awards	20 January 2013	Best Music Director	Sneha Khanwalkar	Nominated	
International Indian Film Academy Awards	6 July 2013	Best Music Director	Sneha Khanwalkar	Nominated	
Screen Awards	12 January 2013	Best Music Director	Sneha Khanwalkar	Nominated	
