= Hotel Milan =

2018 Indian comedy drama film by Vishal Mishra

- Directed by: Vishal Mishra
- Written by: Vishal Mishra; Aabhar Dadhich
- Produced by: Haresh Patel
- Starring: Kunaal Roy Kapur; Karishma Sharma; Zeishan Quadri; Jaideep Ahlawat; Rajesh Sharma; Zakir Hussain; Malvi Malhotra
- Edited by: Sanjay Sankla
- Music by: Harshit Saxena
- Production company: AD Films
- Release date: 16 November 2018 (India)
- Running time: 130 mins.
- Country: India
- Language: Hindi

Hotel Milan is a 2018 Indian comedy drama film directed by Vishal Mishra. It stars Kunaal Roy Kapur, Karishma Sharma, Zeishan Quadri, Jaideep Ahlawat, Rajesh Sharma, Malvi Malhotra and Zakir Hussain. Based on the "anti-Romeo squads" formed by the Yogi Adityanath ministry in Uttar Pradesh, the film was shot in Kanpur and Unnao. It was released on 16 November 2018 and received poor critical reception.

== Plot ==
The film begins with news clips reporting on how the anti-Romeo squads formed in the state of Uttar Pradesh, tasked with preventing Eve teasing and harassment of women at public places, are harassing young couples in the name of morality. Goldie Kaushik (Jaideep Ahlawat), the leader of Bharat Nirmaan Party's Youth Wing in Kanpur, beats up young couples seen together in the name of protecting Indian culture. Given his political position, police officer ACP Yadav helps him in his activities. Vipul (Kunaal Roy Kapur) is chastised by his father for his joblessness and loitering around the city, while his girlfriend Shaheen (Karishma Sharma) does not like his opposition to Kaushik, ultimately breaking up with him for this reason. Desperate to win back her affection and earn money, Vipul along with his friend Saurabh (Zeishan Quadri) decides to open a hotel for young couples. Together they rent an old lodge owned by Saurabh's uncle (Zakir Hussain) and make him a partner in their hotel named "Hotel Milan: Khilte Hain Gul Yahan Khil Ke Bikharne Ko".

They charge customers on hourly basis and very soon the hotel becomes a popular destination for young couples to spend time together without the fear of anti-Romeo squads and public shaming. The trio is reaping a huge profit daily and Shaheen makes up with Vipul. Shaheen and Vipul book a room in the hotel on Valentine's Day but instead go to a nearby dargah on Shaheen's insistence. In Vipul's absence, Kaushik reaches the hotel with his goons. They vandalise the premises and beat up Saurabh and his uncle. Kaushik's goons drag out the couples from their rooms and thrash them mercilessly. Vipul and Shaheen return to find the hotel ransacked. Together they help admit the injured to a nearby hospital and deliberate on their next step. The incident gains huge media coverage and Vipul is invited to one such discussion on television, where he is disheartened by the repeated haggling of Kaushik and another politician. Vipul returns home and informs his friends and family that he is going to file a case against Kaushik and ACP Yadav for vandalising his hotel and beating up his customers and staff. They engage the services of Guptaji (Rajesh Sharma), a lawyer who has not a won a single case until then and is depressed because his wife ran away with his servant.

During the court trial, Kaushik has a case filed against Vipul for running an immoral place and sends goons to Guptaji's house to intimidate him. The latter manages to get over his distress over his wife and presents an incriminating witness in court who had seen Kaushik and his goons beating up young couples outside Milan Hotel and vandalising it. In its judgement, the court comments that the Hotel Milan had been vandalised in a planned conspiracy. It instructs police to suspend ACP Yadav and set up an inquiry against him. To Kaushik, the court awards a fine of ₹3.00 lakh (US$3,100) and orders him to pay ₹20.00 lakh (US$21,000) to the owners of Hotel Milan in compensation. At the end of the film Vipul joins Kaushik's party, stating that his fight against Kaushik was not a personal one.

== Cast ==
- Kunaal Roy Kapur as Vipul
- Karishma Sharma as Shaheen
- Zeishan Quadri as Saurabh
- Jaideep Ahlawat as Goldie Kaushik
- Rajesh Sharma as Guptaji
- Zakir Hussain as Chachaji

== Production ==
After the formation of the Yogi Adityanath ministry in Uttar Pradesh, anti-Romeo squads were set up to prevent Eve teasing, ensure the safety of women at public places, and "create fear among potential harassers". However, the squads drew criticism when videos of them harassing young couples surfaced in the media. Vishal Mishra came up with a story based on these anti-Romeo squads and approached Haresh Patel of AD Films, who agreed to produce it after the first narration. Mishra described it as "quite a daring film".

Kunaal Roy Kapur, Karishma Sharma, Zeishan Quadri, and Jaideep Ahlawat were cast in the film. When questioned by the media regarding the controversial subject matter, Misha responded that he was not expecting any protest against the film.

Principal photography began in Kanpur, Uttar Pradesh, on 18 July 2017. For the hotel scenes, an old bungalow was renovated by the filmmakers. Hotel Milan marked the first film of Karishma Sharma in a leading role. She had previously been seen in Pyaar Ka Punchnama 2. Some of the scenes were shot in Unnao. A.B. Vidyalaya Inter College, Mall Road, was used for the court scenes while location shooting was also done at Guptar Ghat, Swaroop Nagar, Moti Jheel, and Birhana Road. In total, the film crew spent 35 days in Kanpur and cast local actors in supporting roles. Kapur and Mishra would later come together for Marudhar Express (2019).

== Release ==
The film's initial release date was 14 September 2018, which was later changed to 26 October 2018. However, the film was further delayed due to late certification from the Central Board of Film Certification (CBFC), which would not grant an A certificate until footage involving Yogi Adityanath was removed, despite it previously being cleared for use in its trailer. Mishra removed the video but kept Adityanath's audio in the film. The film was eventually released on 16 November 2018, a week following Diwali.

== Soundtrack ==
Hotel Milan

Soundtrack album by Harshit Saxena, Kashi-Richard, Amjad Nadeem, Enbee & Ruchit H Patel
- Released: 28 August 2018
- Recorded: 2018
- Genre: Feature film soundtrack
- Length: 23:41
- Language: Hindi
- Label: Zee Music Company

The soundtrack album was composed by Harshit Saxena, Kashi-Richard, Amjad Nadeem, Enbee & Ruchit H Patel.

Track listing
No.	Title	Lyrics	Music	Singer(s)	Length
1.	"Stepney"	Kumaar	Harshit Saxena	Harshit Saxena	3:39
2.	"Saansein"	Sanjeev Chaturvedi	Ruchit H Patel, Kashi-Richard	Ruchit H Patel	4:38
3.	"Hotel Milan Title Track"	Amjad Nadeem	Amjad Nadeem	Brijesh Shandilya, Shyamoli Sanghi	3:26
4.	"Badi Happening Lagti Ho"	Enbee	Enbee	Jyotica Tangri, Enbee & Raahi	2:45
5.	"Allaudin"	Dev Narayan	Harshit Saxena	Harshit Saxena Feat. Shaan & Shailey Bidwaikar	2:55
6.	"Aa Zara"	Amjad Nadeem	Amjad Nadeem	Aakanksha Sharma	3:33
7.	"Allaudin – Version"	Dev Narayan	Harshit Saxena	Harshit Saxena & Shailey Bidwaikar	2:55
Total length:					23:41

== Reception ==
Pallabi Dey Purkayastha of The Times of India gave the film 1.5 out of 5 stars. She called Quadri's character the "only saving grace" of the film, which to her was "as shady as a love hotel". She stated that Kapur was a "misfit" who struggled with the Kanpur accent and Sharma was "outrageously overdressed". Purkayastha felt that the plot's novelty was the only thing "[working] in favour of the director".

Writing for the Mumbai Mirror, Kunal Guha was critical of the film and gave it a 1-star rating, calling it a film with low "production values" and a "kind of project you'd not wish on your worst enemy". He felt that the film was poor on the technical front and that some of the staff might have "walked off the project midway", putting more pressure on the staff that remained. He likened the film to "mediocre sitcoms" for its "jarring laughter track". On the film's characters, Guha noted that Quadri was "barely tolerable" and Kapur's acting was "[discomforting]". He advised Ahlawat to be careful while reviewing a film's script.
