= Coffee with D =

2017 Indian Hindi-language satirical film

- Coffee with D Official Movie Poster
- Directed by: Vishal Mishra
- Written by: Dialogues: Aabhar Dadhich
- Screenplay by: Aabhar Dadhich
- Story by: Vishal Mishra
- Produced by: Vinod Ramani
- Starring: Sunil Grover; Zakir Hussain; Dipannita Sharma; Anjana Sukhani; Rajesh Sharma
- Cinematography: Anshul Chobey
- Edited by: Banty Nagi
- Music by: Superbia
- Production company: Apex Entertainment
- Release date: 20 January 2017
- Country: India
- Language: Hindi
- Box office: ₹72 lakh

Coffee with D is a 2017 Indian Hindi-language satirical film directed by Vishal Mishra and produced by Vinod Ramani, starring Sunil Grover and Zakir Husain. Coffee with D was released on 20 January 2017. The film received mixed reviews from critics and failed commercially at the box office.

== Plot ==
Arnab Ghosh is a senior editor and news anchor at the NB News channel. He hosts a prime-time show, interviewing different people, including politicians. Due to low ratings, his boss, Roy, transfers him to a cooking show and asks him to come up with a new idea for another show.

Parul, Arnab's wife, suggests he interview the feared Don/crime boss, D. Arnab and his colleagues shoot fake videos about D and post them on social media in order to make D angry. He agrees to stop posting the videos after receiving a call from Girdhari, D's CEO, on the condition that D consents to be interviewed. D agrees, while planning to kill Arnab live during the TV show.

Arnab and his colleagues are brought to a secret location in Karachi by D's men, while two other gangsters arrive at Arnab's home in order to hold his family hostage. Arnab starts the interview, but D does not answer any of the questions correctly. Arnab receives a call from his wife, who asks him not to be a coward and to prove D wrong. In the last part of the interview, Arnab accuses D of being responsible for terrorist activities, calling him a fraud and not a Don. On hearing this, D dies of a heart attack.

Later, at his home, Arnab receives a call from David Adrees Kaleman, who reveals himself to be D. A flashback shows that D only pretended to die so that he could leave his original identity and begin a new life. Arnab is happy that there is no longer any persona such as D left in the world.

== Cast ==
- Sunil Grover as Arnab Ghosh, Senior Editor
- Zakir Hussain as D
- Dipannita Sharma as Neha
- Anjana Sukhani as Parul, Arnab's wife
- Rajesh Sharma as News channel owner Roy
- Pankaj Tripathi as Girdhari, D's CEO
- Vinod Ramani as Rummy
- Guru Singh as Chussy
- Firoz as Peter
- Saurabh as Vivek
- Manan Sampat as Ansari
- Majid Sheikh as Aaftab Bhai
- Akhilesh Tiwari as shopkeeper

== Soundtrack ==
Coffee With D

Soundtrack album by Superbia
- Released: 2017
- Genre: Feature film soundtrack
- Label: Zee Music Company

Songs were composed by Superbia band members (Shaan, Gourav Dasgupta, and Roshin Balu). Sameer Anjaan is the lyricist. Dhruv Dhalla provided the background score.

All lyrics are written by Sameer; all music is composed by Superbia.

Track listing
No.	Title	Singer(s)	Length
1.	"Coffee With D"	Anu Malik	3:30
2.	"Nation Wants To Know"	Shaan	3:08
3.	"Ali Ali"	Shabab Sabri	5:35
4.	"Tumhari Mohabbat"	Shaan, Aakanksha Sharma	4:03

== Critical reception ==
Coffee with D received mixed reviews from critics.

The Times of India rated it 2/5, writing "To make a satire on Dawood Ibrahim is a brave effort, no doubt. But is it a successful effort? Barely."

Rohit Vats from Hindustan Times rated it 1.5/5, writing "A caricatured D and his antics, coupled with bad sound designing, make Coffee With D end nowhere close to a fun film it could have been." Financial Express rated it 1.5/5, and wrote "Spend your money on some cappuccino instead and save your brain cells." Rediff.com also rated it 1.5/5, writing "Coffee With D does not have a bad plot but it could do with a better on-screen translation. What lets down the film is the way it is executed and shot. The film's music and dubbing too are disappointing." News18 rated it 1/5, writing "To opt a theme impersonating a real-life don and a high-profile journalist maybe a brave attempt but in this case, it's neither successful nor entertaining." Firstpost rated the film 1/5, writing "It is infuriating to learn that a producer actually backed this bag of garbage in its entirety. Coffee With D made me angry because it has managed to come to theatres and get good time slots in prime halls despite being a zero, while some excellent small films never manage a theatrical release." Mayank Shekhar from Mid-Day rated the film 1/5, writing "What do we learn about Dawood, thanks to 'Coffee With D'? That he diverted the Malaysian Airline Flight 370, because he was travelling from KL to Karachi, but the flight itself was headed to Beijing. He just landed the plane in his house, and the missing passengers are now his servants. Eh? This is not even funny." Shubhra Gupta from The Indian Express rated it 0.5/5, writing "When the film is about Don Dawood and an Arnab Goswami doppelganger, you expect jokes galore. What you get instead is this craving to run as far away from theatre as possible." Film Companion rated it 0/5, writing "Instead of a rollicking clever satire, what we get is an amateur production with juvenile ideas and unfunny jokes." Yahoo.com wrote "Coffee With D aims for conversational comedy, but it never quite hits its stride. Grover, the television actor best known for his mimicry-based characters Gutthi and Rinku Bhabhi, is miscast as the hero of the enterprise. Grover doesn’t have the ability to command the big screen, and the absence of clever dialogue leaves him visibly floundering."
