= Vishal Mishra (director) =

Indian filmmaker

Vishal Ranjan Mishra
- Born: Vishal Mishra; 5 April 1978 (age 48); Kanpur, Uttar Pradesh
- Education: MBA
- Occupations: Film Director, Screenwriter, Lyricist
- Years active: 2016–present
- Known for: Coffee with D

Vishal Ranjan Mishra is a Hindi film writer and director, known for his films like Coffee with D, Marudhar Express, Hotel Milan and Ae Kaash Ke Hum.

He recently completed shooting an untitled murder mystery starring Vivek Oberoi and Nithya Menen.

== Early life ==
Vishal Ranjan Mishra was born and brought up in Kanpur, Uttar Pradesh where he completed his schooling. He went on to join NIFT Bengaluru to pursue his MBA in Fashion.

== Career ==
He started his career as a film critic and a short film director. He made two short films and was awarded the Best Debut Director at the Rio Film Festival in 2009 for his short film The Musk.

His debuted as a director with Coffee with D starring Sunil Grover, Dipannita Sharma and Anjana Sukhani. The film released in cinemas on Jan, 2017. The director and makers of the film received threat calls from Chhota Shakeel, asking them to either delete the portions that make fun of underworld don Dawood Ibrahim in the film or not release the film at all. Vishal Mishra won the Best New Age Film Director Award for this film, at the 10th Global Film Festival by the Asian Academy of Film & Television (AAFT).

He then directed Marudhar Express starring Kunaal Roy Kapur, Tara Alisha Berry and Rajesh Sharma, released in cinemas on 5 July 2019. It is a sweet small-town romantic film set in Kanpur. He also directed Hotel Milan starring Kunaal Roy Kapur, Zeishan Quadri, Jaideep Ahlawat, Rajesh Sharma, Karishma Sharma and Zakir Hussain. The film Hotel Milan is based on Anti Romeo squad and moral policing in UP that released in cinemas on 16 November 2018.

His upcoming movie is called Ae Kaash Ke Hum which revolves around three youngsters and story of their love, friendship and fate.

He recently finished shooting for an untitled murder mystery, starring Vivek Oberoi, Nithya Menen and Ashish Vidyarthi in Scotland, expected to release soon.

In addition to this, he also wrote the lyrics for the song Heeriye from the movie Happy Hardy and Heer and he also penned the lyrics for Chaasni Si, a song from Marudhar Express, a movie he also directed.

== Filmography ==
Year	Film	Genre	Director	Writer	Lyricist	Notes
2010	The Musk		Yes	Yes		Short Film
2011	The Undoubtful Minds		Yes	Yes		Short Film
2017	Coffee with D	Comic Satire	Yes	Yes		Feature Film
2018	Hotel Milan	Political Satire	Yes	Yes		Feature Film
2019	Marudhar Express	Dramedy	Yes	Yes	Yes	Chaasni Si
2020	Happy Hardy and Heer	Musical Romance			Yes	Heeriye
TBA	Ae Kaash Ke Hum	Romance	Yes	Yes	Yes	Feature Film
TBA	Rosie: The Saffron Chapter	Horror Thriller	Yes	Yes		Feature Film
TBA	Mr & Mrs Grey	Murder Mystery	Yes	Yes		Feature Film
