= Priyanka Bassi =

Indian television actress

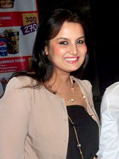
- Born: Delhi, India
- Occupations: Actress, Model
- Years active: 2005–present

Priyanka Bassi is an Indian television actress popularly known for her famous role as Cadet Naina Singh Ahluwalia in the popular soap Left Right Left. She is originally from Delhi and has also attended Barry John's Theatre Group.

== Television career ==
Priyanka made her debut with India's second English-language soap opera Bombay Talking in 2005 She played Sheena Malik, an aspiring actress in Bollywood. Her performance was well-received, and she was nominated for the Indian Telly Awards 2006.

Beginning in 2006, she played the character Naina Singh Ahluwalia in the show Left Right Left. She was nominated for several awards for the role, including the 2007 Ita Best Actress award. She won the Idea Glamour star of the year award in 2007.

In 2008, she participated in Mr. & Ms. TV on Sony, where she reached the semi-finals.

In December 2010, she returned to TV screen with Rang Badalti Odhni on Star One.

In April 2011 starred as Kaya Sehgal in Surya The Super Cop on Sony Entertainment Television.

In 2012, she participated in Star Plus's Indian version of the reality show Survivor. She was voted out in the fifth episode.

In 2012, she acted in one episode of Fear Files as Laila, which aired on Zee TV.

In 2013, "Priyanka Bassi" ventured into film and television production and set up her production companies, collaborating as a partner with "Zeishan Quadri" Friday to Friday Entertainers & Media Pvt. Ltd. and Magical Sevenus Pvt. Ltd.

In 201,5 her 1st production "Meeruthiya Gangster" as a producer, is due to release on 18 September.

In 2019, she produced the ZEE5 original web series Bhoot Purva under Friday to Friday Entertainers & Media Pvt. Ltd. and the web series was directed by Zeishan Quadri.

== Reality shows ==
- 2012 Survivor India as a contestant

== Modelling ==
Apart from acting, Priyanka has also done modelling for several brands, including Santoor and Bsl Suitings. She has appeared in many music videos, including the popular 'Para Hoja Soniye' sung by Channi Singh.

== Awards ==
Year	Award	Category	Serial	Outcome
2015	Indian Telly Awards	Fresh New Face (Female)	Bombay Talking	Nominated
