= Faheem Khan =

Indian criminal

- Born: Wasseypur, Dhanbad, Bihar (now Jharkhand)
- Occupation: Gangster
- Criminal charges: Murder, attempted murder, kidnapping, and assaults.
- Criminal penalty: Life Imprisonment
- Children: Iqbal Khan, Saddam Khan, Zafar Khan
- Parent: Shafiq Khan

Faheem Khan is a criminal from Wasseypur in Dhanbad, Jharkhand, India. He is convicted in Murder, Attempt of Murder, Kidnapping, Assaults charges. The Bollywood movie Gangs of Wasseypur which was directed by Anurag Kashyap is based on his life.
