= Kunaal Roy Kapur =

Indian actor (born 1979)

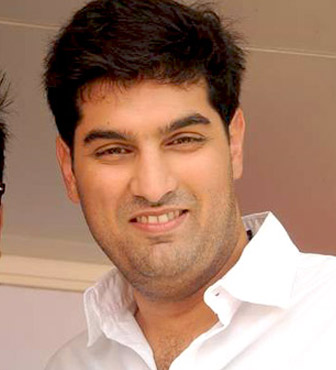
- Kapur in 2012
- Born: 13 February 1979 (age 47); Bombay, Maharashtra, India
- Occupation: Actor
- Years active: 1999–present
- Spouse: Shayonti Salvi (m. 2005)
- Children: 2
- Family: See Roy Kapur family

Kunaal Roy Kapur (born 13 February 1979) is an Indian actor, best known for his roles in Delhi Belly (2011), Yeh Jawaani Hai Deewani (2013) and TVF Tripling (2016–2022).

== Background and personal life ==
Kunaal comes from a family of mixed Hindu Punjabi and Baghdadi Jewish heritage. His paternal grandfather, Raghupat Roy Kapur (or Raghupat Rai Kapoor), was a film producer. Kunaal's father was Kumud Roy Kapur, and his mother, Salome Roy Kapur, is of Baghdadi Jewish descent whose ancestors migrated to India from Palestine and Iraq as merchants. A dancer, dance instructor, stage choreographer and former Miss India, Salome is the daughter of Sam and Ruby Aaron, who were among the earliest accredited teachers of Ballroom and Latin American dancing in India.

Kunaal is the second of three brothers. His elder brother is Siddharth Roy Kapur, CEO of UTV and Disney India, and his younger brother is film actor Aditya Roy Kapur. Actress Vidya Balan is married to Siddharth.

Kunaal has been married to Shayonti Salvi since 2005. Shayonti is of mixed Maharashtrian and Sindhi heritage. The couple has a son named Zahaan and a daughter named Shaziyah.

== Career ==
Kapur started his acting career with the Indian soap Just Mohabbat (1997–98), which aired on Sony TV. He then appeared in a cameo role in the 2007 film, Loins of Punjab Presents opposite Shabana Azmi and Ishita Sharma. He was also seen in Panga Naa Lo.

In 2006, Kunaal directed the comedy play, The President Is Coming. He adapted the play into film, to make his directorial debut with the mockumentary The President Is Coming (2009), starring Konkona Sen Sharma and Shernaz Patel, which opened to mixed reviews and was declared a "Semi-Hit".

Kapur appeared in six episodes of British-Indian comedy series Mumbai Calling (2009) as a call centre operator. He then appeared in Aamir Khan Productions' Delhi Belly (2011) alongside Imran Khan and Vir Das. Thereafter, he acted in Nautanki Saala (2013) with Ayushman Khurana and did a small role in Yeh Jawaani Hai Deewani (2013) with an ensemble cast, including Ranbir Kapoor, Deepika Padukone, and his younger brother Aditya. Then he appeared in Action Jackson directed by Prabhu Deva, along with Ajay Devgan, Sonakshi Sinha and Yami Gautam and Gollu Aur Pappu, along with Vir Das and Karishma Tanna. His last release was Azhar, where he played Reddy (Azharuddin's lawyer). He then appeared in the 2017 release The Final Exit. He was next seen in Vishal Mishra directorial Hotel Milan alongside Zeishan Quadri, Karishma Sharma, Jaideep Ahlawat, Rajesh Sharma and Zakir Hussain. Then he acted in an eight episode web series called Going Viral, which aired on Amazon prime and in Eros Now's comedy Side Hero. In 2019, he starred in another Mishra directored film, Marudhar Express. It was a sweet small town romantic film set in Kanpur. He was also seen on web series TVF Tripling (season 1 and 2) as Pranav.

Kunaal appeared in a short film named Smartphone which also starred Hina Khan and Akshay Oberoi.

== Filmography ==
=== Films ===
Year	Title	Role	Notes
2007	Panga Na Lo	Bhura	
2007	Loins of Punjab Presents	Mr. White	Indo-American film
2008	Revolution	Feroz's father	
2009	The President Is Coming	—N/a	Director only
2011	Delhi Belly	Nitin Berry	
2013	Nautanki Saala	Mandar Lele	
2013	Yeh Jawaani Hai Deewani	Taran	
2014	Gollu Aur Pappu	Gollu	
2014	Action Jackson	Musa	
2016	Azhar	Lawyer Reddy	
2017	The Final Exit	Photographer	
2018	Kaalakaandi	Zubin	
2018	Love per Square Foot	Samuel Masquita	Netflix film
2018	Hotel Milan	Vipul	
2019	Marudhar Express	Marudhar	
2020	Footfairy	Jashua Mathews	Television film
2021	Tribhanga	Milan Upadhyay	Netflix film
2022	Radhe Shyam	Vedant	Telugu-Hindi bilingual film
2025	Dil Dosti Aur Dogs	Arjun Kamat	
2026	Don't Be Shy	Mr. Q	Prime Video film

=== Television ===
Year	Title	Role	Notes
1999–2000	Just Mohabbat	Sanjay	Television debut
2007	Mumbai calling	Call center operator	
2016–2022	TVF Tripling	Pranav, Chanchal's Husband	
2017	Going Viral	Gaurav	
2018	Side Hero	Kunaal Roy Kapur	Eros Now series
2019	Parchhayee: Ghost Stories by Ruskin Bond	Ganpat	Episodic role; Zee5 series
2020–2024	Bandish Bandits	Arghya	Amazon Prime Video series
2020–2024	Sandwiched Forever	Sameer Shastry	Sony LIV series
2022	Aadha Ishq	Milind	Voot series
2022	Shadyantra	Mohan Khanna	Teleplay on Zee Theatre
2025	Thode Dur Thode Paas	Kunal Mehta	

=== Music video ===
Year	Title	Role	Artist
2022	"Hairaan"	Lead	Javed Ali featuring Nia Sharma
