= 14th IIFA Awards =

Indian film award ceremony in 2013

- Date: 4 July 2013– 6 July 2013
- Site: The Venetian Macao, Macau
- Hosted by: Shah Rukh Khan; Shahid Kapoor

Highlights
- Best Picture: Barfi!
- Best Direction: Anurag Basu (Barfi!)
- Best Actor: Ranbir Kapoor (Barfi!)
- Best Actress: Vidya Balan (Kahaani)
- Most awards: Barfi! (14)
- Most nominations: Barfi! (21)

Television coverage
- Channel: Star Plus
- Network: STAR TV

The 2013 IIFA Awards, officially the 14th International Indian Film Academy Awards ceremony, presented by the International Indian Film Academy honouring the Bollywood films of 2012, took place between 4–6 July 2013. The winners were announced on 6 July 2013 at The Venetian Macao, Macau for the second time after 2009. The ceremony was hosted by the actors Shah Rukh Khan and Shahid Kapoor. The ceremony was televised in India and internationally on Star Plus.

Barfi! led the ceremony with 13 nominations, followed by Vicky Donor with 9 nominations, Agneepath and Gangs of Wasseypur – Part 1 with 8 nominations each, and Cocktail with 5 nominations.

Barfi! won 14 awards, including Best Film, Best Director (for Anurag Basu), and Best Actor (for Ranbir Kapoor), thus becoming the most-awarded film at the ceremony.

Nawazuddin Siddiqui received dual nominations for Best Supporting Actor for his performances in Gangs of Wasseypur – Part 1 and Talaash: The Answer Lies Within, but lost to Annu Kapoor, who won the award for Vicky Donor.

== Winners and nominees ==
=== Popular awards ===
| Best Picture | Best Director |
|---|---|
| Barfi! – UTV Motion Pictures; English Vinglish – Eros Entertainment; Gangs of Wasseypur – Part 1 – Viacom 18 Motion Pictures; Kahaani – Viacom 18 Motion Pictures, Pen India Pvt.Ltd; Paan Singh Tomar – UTV Motion Pictures; Talaash: The Answer Lies Within – Excel Entertainment, Aamir Khan Productions; Vicky Donor – Eros Entertainment, John Abraham Entertainment | Anurag Basu – Barfi!; Anurag Kashyap – Gangs of Wasseypur – Part 1; Shoojit Sircar – Vicky Donor; Sujoy Ghosh – Kahaani; Tigmanshu Dhulia – Paan Singh Tomar |
| Best Actor In A Leading Role | Best Actress In A Leading Role |
| Ranbir Kapoor – Barfi! as Murphy "Barfi" Johnson; Ayushmann Khurrana – Vicky Donor as Vicky Arora; Hrithik Roshan – Agneepath as Vijay Deenanath Chauhan; Irrfan Khan – Paan Singh Tomar as Paan Singh Tomar; Manoj Bajpai – Gangs of Wasseypur – Part 1 as Sardar Khan; Shah Rukh Khan – Jab Tak Hai Jaan as Samar | Vidya Balan – Kahaani as Vidya Bagchi; Deepika Padukone – Cocktail as Veronica Malaney; Huma Qureshi – Gangs of Wasseypur – Part 2 as Mohsina; Kareena Kapoor – Heroine as Mahi Arora; Priyanka Chopra – Barfi! as Jhilmil Chatterjee; Sridevi – English Vinglish as Shashi Godbole |
| Best Actor In A Supporting Role | Best Actress In A Supporting Role |
| Annu Kapoor – Vicky Donor as Dr. Baldev Chaddha; Akshay Kumar – OMG – Oh My God! as Krishna Vasudev Yadav; Mithun Chakraborty – OMG – Oh My God! as Leeladhar Swamy; Nawazuddin Siddiqui – Gangs of Wasseypur – Part 1 as Faizal Khan; Nawazuddin Siddiqui – Talaash: The Answer Lies Within as Taimur; Saurabh Shukla – Barfi! as Sudhanshu Dutta | Anushka Sharma – Jab Tak Hai Jaan as Akira Rai; Diana Penty – Cocktail as Meera Sahni; Divya Dutta – Heroine as Pallavi Narayan; Dolly Ahluwalia – Vicky Donor as Mrs. Arora; Jacqueline Fernandez – Housefull 2 as Bobby; Reema Sen – Gangs of Wasseypur – Part 1 as Durga |
| Male Debutant Star | Female Debutant Star |
| Ayushmann Khurrana – Vicky Donor | Yami Gautam – Vicky Donor |
| Best Performance In A Comic Role | Best Performance In A Negative Role |
| Abhishek Bachchan – Bol Bachchan as Abbas Ali / Abhishek Bachchan; Annu Kapoor– Vicky Donor as Dr. Baldev Chaddha; Boman Irani – Cocktail as Randhir "Randy" Kapoor alias Tinku; Chunky Pandey – Housefull 2 as Aakhri Pasta; Paresh Rawal – OMG – Oh My God! as Kanji Lalji Mehta | Rishi Kapoor – Agneepath as Rauf Lala; Bipasha Basu– Raaz 3 as Shanaya Shekhar; Sanjay Dutt – Agneepath as Kancha Cheena; Saswata Chatterjee – Kahaani as Bob Biswas; Tigmanshu Dhulia – Gangs of Wasseypur – Part 1 as Ramadhir |
| Best Story | Debutant Director |
| Anurag Basu and Tani Basu – Barfi!; Gauri Shinde – English Vinglish; Juhi Chaturvedi– Vicky Donor; Sanjay Chauhan, Tigmanshu Dhulia – Paan Singh Tomar; Zeishan Quadri – Gangs of Wasseypur – Part 1 | Gauri Shinde – English Vinglish |

=== Musical awards ===
| Best Music Direction | Best Lyrics |
|---|---|
| Barfi! – Pritam Chakraborty; Agneepath – Ajay–Atul; Cocktail – Pritam Chakraborty; Gangs of Wasseypur – Part 1 - Sneha Khanwalkar; Jab Tak Hai Jaan - A.R. Rahman | "Abhi Mujh Mein Kahin" from Agneepath – Amitabh Bhattacharya; "Aashiyan (Solo)" from Barfi! – Swanand Kirkire; "Jee Le Zaraa" from Talaash: The Answer Lies Within – Javed Akhtar; "Paani Da Rang" from Vicky Donor – Ayushmann Khurrana, Rochak Kohli; "Phir Le Aya Dil (Reprise)" from Barfi! – Sayeed Quadri; "Saans" from Jab Tak Hai Jaan – Gulzar |
| Best Male Playback Singer | Best Female Playback Singer |
| Sonu Nigam for "Abhi Mujh Mein Kahin" – Agneepath; Ajay Gogavale for "Deva Shree Ganesha" – Agneepath; Ayushmann Khurrana for "Pani Da Rang" – Vicky Donor; Mika Singh for "Pungi" – Agent Vinod; Nikhil Paul George for "Aashiyan (Solo)" – Barfi!; Nikhil Paul George for "Main Kya Karoon" – Barfi! | Shreya Ghoshal for "Chikni Chameli" – Agneepath; Kavita Seth for "Tumhi Ho Bandhu" – Cocktail; Rekha Bhardwaj for "Phir Le Aya Dil" – Barfi!; Shalmali Kholgade for "Pareshaan" – Ishaqzaade; Shreya Ghoshal for "Aashiyan" – Barfi! |
| Best Sound Design | Best Background Score |
| Barfi! – Shajith Koyeri | Barfi! – Pritam |

=== Technical awards ===
| Best Action | Best Special Effects |
|---|---|
| Gangs of Wasseypur – Part 1 – Shyam Kaushal | Ek Tha Tiger – Pankaj Khandpur, Sherry Bharda & Vishal Anand — Tata Elxsi |
| Best Choreography | Best Cinematography |
| Agneepath – Ganesh Acharya for "Chikni Chameli" | Barfi! – Ravi Varman I.S.C |
| Best Costume Design | Best Dialogue |
| Barfi! – Aki Narula and Shefalina | Gangs of Wasseypur – Part 1 – Zeishan Quadri, Akhilesh Jaiswal, Sachin Ladia & Anurag Kashyap (tie); Vicky Donor – Juhi Chaturvedi (tie) |
| Best Editing | Best Makeup |
| Kahaani – Namrata Rao | Barfi! – Uday Serali |
| Best Production Design | Best Screenplay |
| Barfi! – Rajat Poddar | Barfi! – Anurag Basu & Tani Basu |
| Best Sound Mixing | Best Sound Recording |
| Barfi! – Debajit Changmai | Barfi! – Eric Pillai -Future Sound Of Bombay |

=== Special awards ===
| Category | Recipient(s) |
|---|---|
| IIFA 2013 Macau is Dedicated to | Yash Chopra |
| Outstanding Contribution to Indian Cinema | Javed Akhtar |
| Outstanding Achievement by an Indian in International Cinema | Anupam Kher |
| Digital Star | Shahrukh Khan |

== Superlatives ==
Films with multiple nominations
| Nominations | Film |
|---|---|
| 13 | Barfi! |
| 9 | Vicky Donor |
| 8 | Agneepath |
| 8 | Gangs of Wasseypur – Part 1 |
| 5 | Cocktail |
| 4 | Jab Tak Hai Jaan |
| 4 | Kahaani |
| 4 | Paan Singh Tomar |
| 3 | Housefull 2 |
| 3 | OMG – Oh My God! |
| 3 | Talaash: The Answer Lies Within |
| 2 | Heroine |

Films with multiple awards
| Awards | Film |
|---|---|
| 14 | Barfi! |
| 5 | Agneepath |
| 4 | Vicky Donor |
| 2 | Gangs of Wasseypur – Part 1 |
| 2 | Kahaani |
