= Anurita Jha =

Indian actress and model

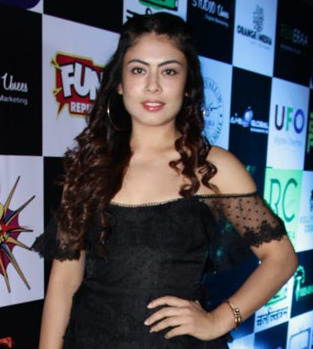
- Jha at 3rd Expandables Awards in 2019
- Born: Katihar, Bihar, India
- Occupations: Actress, model
- Years active: 2012–present

Anurita Jha is an Indian actress and model. She hails from Katihar, Bihar and was groomed and studied at Patna and Delhi (correspondence study). She has taken part in fashion weeks in Delhi as well as Mumbai. She made her acting debut in Bollywood with Anurag Kashyap's Gangs of Wasseypur - Part 1 and appeared in its sequel Gangs of Wasseypur - Part 2 too. She took part in the Ford Supermodel competition in 2005, and won the "Channel V Get Gorgeous 2006" competition in 2006.

== Filmography ==
=== Films ===
Year	Film	Role	Notes
2012	Gangs of Wasseypur	Shama Parveen	
2012	Gangs of Wasseypur 2	Shama Parveen	
2016	Mithila Makhaan	Maithili	Maithili film
2019	Bharat	Maya	
2021	Helmet	Rani	
2022	Rocketry: The Nambi Effect	Mariyam Rashida	Trilingual film
2022	Thai Massage	Anu Dubey	

=== Web series ===
Year	Title	Role	Platform	Notes
2019	Parchhayee	Lakshmi	ZEE5	
2020	Aashram	Kavita	MX Player	
2020	PariWar	Manju Narayan	Hotstar	
2023	Asur season2	Kamini/Killer	JioCinema	
2024	The Indrani Mukerjea Story: Buried Truth	Indrani Mukerjea	Netflix	
