= Vivaan Shah =

Indian film actor (born 1990)

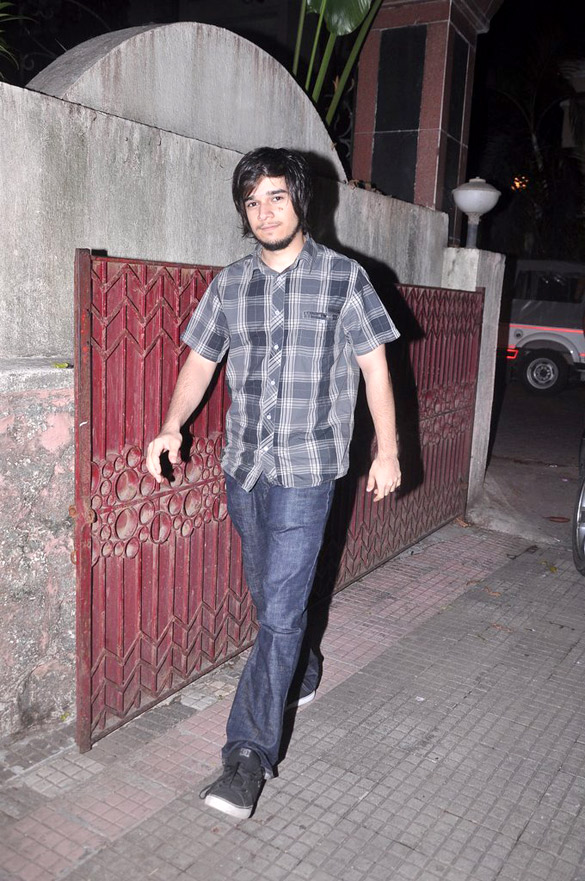
- Shah in June 2012
- Born: 11 January 1990 (age 36); Mumbai, Maharashtra, India
- Occupation: Actor
- Years active: 2011–present
- Parent(s): Naseeruddin Shah; Ratna Pathak
- Relatives: Shah family

Vivaan Shah (born 11 January 1990) is an Indian actor who appears in Hindi films. He made his film debut with Saat Khoon Maaf (2011) as Arun Kumar. Thereafter, he signed a three-film deal with director Vishal Bhardwaj. In 2014, he was given a role in Farah Khan's film Happy New Year.

== Personal life ==
Vivaan Shah is the younger son of actors Naseeruddin Shah and Ratna Pathak. He is the nephew of Lt. Gen. Zameer Uddin Shah, the former vice-chancellor of Aligarh Muslim University. He is the brother of Imaad Shah and his paternal half sister is Heeba Shah.

Shah graduated from The Doon School in 2009. Upon completing his schooling, he applied at St. Stephen's College in Delhi University but missed out on getting his history honours by just a mark. Unhappy with just pursuing a regular BA Honours, he moved back to Mumbai after his first year of degree college, and studied at Jai Hind College.

== Filmography ==
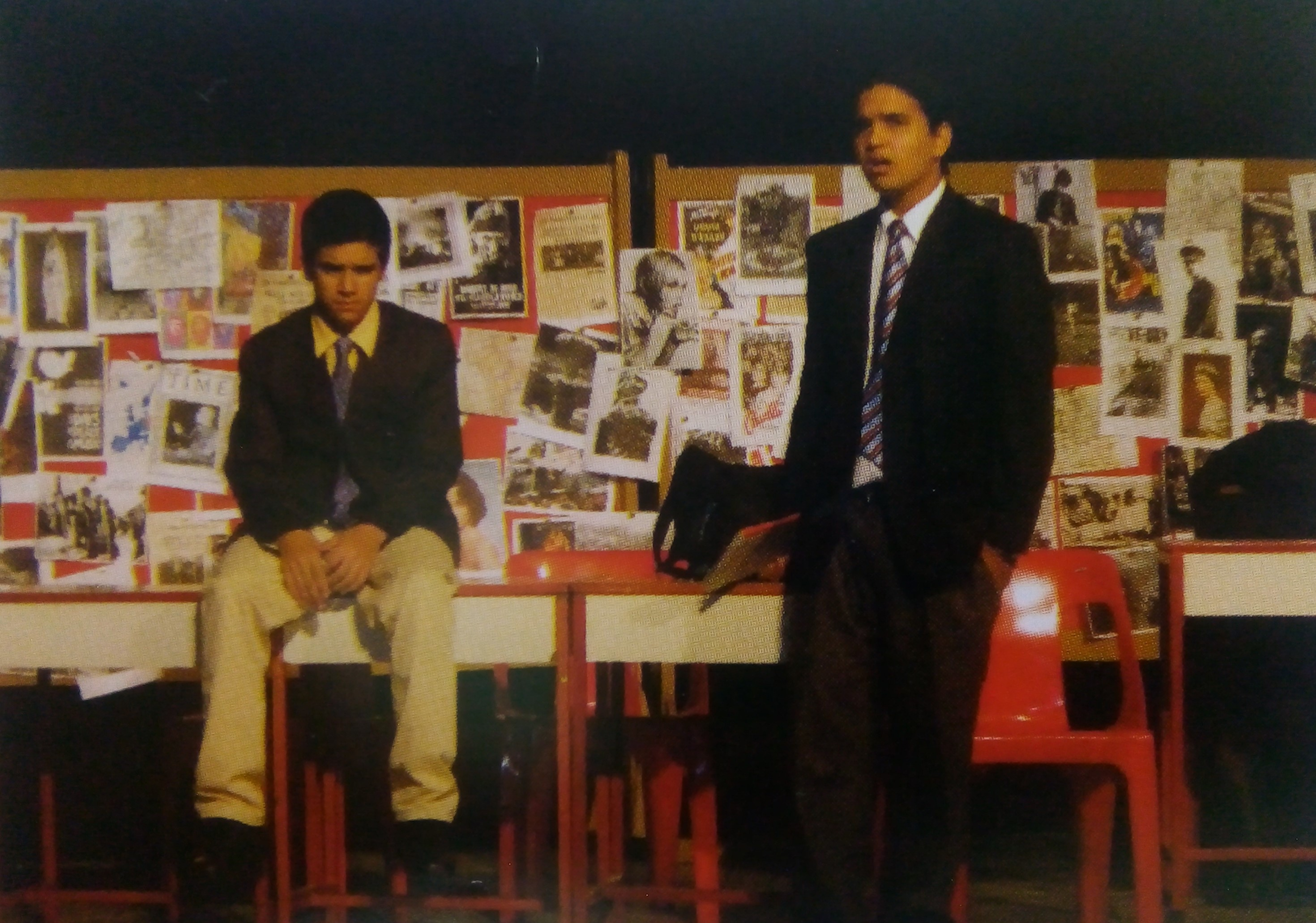
Shah playing Irwin in the 2007 production of Alan Bennett's The History Boys at The Doon School, Dehradun.

Year	Title	Role	Notes
2011	7 Khoon Maaf	Dr. Arun Kumar	
2014	Happy New Year	Rohan	
2015	Bombay Velvet	Tony	
2017	Laali Ki Shaadi Mein Laaddoo Deewana	Laaddoo	
2020	Kabaad The Coin	Bandhan	
2020	Ae Kaash Ke Hum	Aayush	
2023	Coat	Madho Ram	
2025	Inn Galiyon Mein	Hari Ram	
2026	Ikkis	Captain Vijendra Malhotra	
2028	Bura Na Maano Holi Hai	TBA	

== Television ==
Year	Title	Role	Notes
2020	A Suitable Boy	Varun Mehra	BBC One & Netflix
2023	Charlie Chopra	Jimmy Nautiyal	SonyLIV
2024	Doctors	Dr. Roy Saldanha	JioCinema
