= Meeruthiya Gangsters =

2015 comedy film directed by Zeishan Quadri

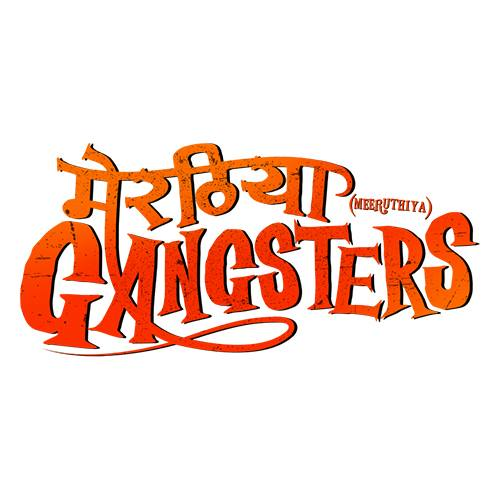
- Directed by: Zeishan Quadri
- Story by: Gibran Noorani
- Produced by: Prashant Tiwari; Prateek Tiwari; Shoeb Ahmed; Zeishan Quadri; Priyanka Bassi
- Starring: Jaideep Ahlawat; Aakash Dahiya; Vansh Bhardwaj; Chandrachoor Rai; Shadab Kamal; Jatin Sarna; Nikhil Punia
- Cinematography: Naren Gedia
- Edited by: Anurag Kashyap; Ashish Gai; Sachin Shivalia
- Music by: Siddhant Madhav; Vivek Kar
- Production companies: Prateek Entertainments Pvt Ltd; Friday to Friday Entertainers & Media Pvt Ltd
- Distributed by: Prateek Group
- Release date: 18 September 2015
- Country: India
- Language: Hindi

Meeruthiya Gangsters (transl. Gangsters of Meerut) is a 2015 Indian Hindi-language crime-comedy film written and directed by Zeishan Quadri and produced by Gibran Noorani. The film score is composed by Vivek Kar and Siddhant Mishra. Meeruthiya Gangsters was released on 18 September 2015. It is inspired by the high number of extortion cases in Meerut, Uttar Pradesh. The film is based from the perspective of six youths who turn kidnappers. The first look poster was released on 29 July 2015, followed by the trailer on 10 August 2015.

== Cast ==
- Jaideep Ahlawat as Nikhil
- Aakash Dahiya as Amit
- Vansh Bhardwaj as Gagan
- Chandrachoor Rai as Rahul 'Challenger'
- Shadab Kamal as Sunny
- Jatin Sarna as Sanjay 'Foreigner'
- Nushrat Bharucha as Mansi
- Ishita Raj Sharma as Pooja
- Sanjay Mishra as Mama
- Mukul Dev as R K Singh
- Brijendra Kala as Jayantilal
- Sumit Sethi as DJ Sumit
- Soundarya Sharma as Alka
- Suparna Krishna as Aniket's wife
- Shrikant Verma
- Alok Sharma
- Sachin Shivalia

== Soundtrack ==
Album consists of 8 tracks composed by Siddhant Mishra, Vivek Kar and Siddhant Madhav. Lyrics penned by Kumaar, Kunwar Juneja and Arafat Mehmood. Suresh Raina, Indian sensational cricketer, lent his voice to the song – "Tu Mili Sab Mila", in this film.

No.	Title	Singer(s)	Length
1.	"Meeruthiya Gangsters"	Zubeen Garg
2.	"Naina Tose Lage (Female Version)"	Pawni Pandey
3.	"Hum-Toh Jeete Hain"	Siddhant Madhav, Pawni Pandey
4.	"Mastam Mastam"	Mika Singh
5.	"Babaji Ka Ghanta"	Divya Kumar
6.	"Meeruthiya Gangsters (Bonus Track)"	Dev Negi
7.	"Naina Tose Lage"	Rahat Fateh Ali Khan
8.	"Tu Mili Sab Mila"	Suresh Raina
