= Ae Kaash Ke Hum =

- Theatrical release poster
- Directed by: Vishal Mishra
- Story by: Aabhar Dadhich
- Produced by: Kiran K Talasila
- Starring: Vivaan Shah Priya Singh Sophia Singh
- Cinematography: Anshul Chobey
- Edited by: Ashish Arjun Gaikar
- Country: India
- Language: Hindi

Ae Kaash Ke Hum is an unreleased Indian romantic film directed by Vishal Mishra. The film stars Vivaan Shah, Priya Singh and Sophia Singh in the lead roles. The film revolves around campus friendship and romance of three youngsters and has a very authentic nostalgic feel of 90's. The film was shot in Dharamshala, Himachal Pradesh. The film was earlier titled as Abhi Na Jao Chhod Kar. The film was produced by Kiran K Talasila and co-produced by Pankaj Thalore.

== Synopsis ==
Ae Kaash Ke Hum is the story of three youngsters and their love, friendship and fate. Pari is a girl who falls in love with her classmate, Ayush but by the time she expresses her love, it's already too late. The fate takes her love away and when it comes back, the life has already taken a turn for the worse.

== Cast ==
- Vivaan Shah as Ayush
- Priya Singh as Pari
- Sophiya Singh as Sania
