= Reema Sen =

Indian actress and model (b. 1981)

- Born: 29 October 1981 (age 44); Kolkata, West Bengal, India
- Other name: Hema
- Education: St Thomas School, Kolkata
- Occupations: Actress; Model
- Years active: 2000–2012
- Spouse: Shiv Karan Singh (m. 2012)
- Children: 1

Reema Sen (Bengali pronunciation: [rima ʃen]; born 29 October 1981) is a former Indian actress and model who primarily appeared in Tamil, Telugu, and Hindi films.

== Early life and education ==
Reema Sen was born in Kolkata on 29 October 1981. She completed high school from St. Thomas Girls School in Kidderpore, Kolkata, after which her family moved to Mumbai.

== Personal life ==
Sen married businessman Shiv Karan Singh in 2012. She gave birth to their son on 22 February 2013.

== Career ==
=== Film and modelling career ===
In Mumbai, she began her modelling career, appearing in a number of advertising campaigns. She then moved to films and made her acting debut with Telugu film Chitram, in which she acted opposite Uday Kiran, whom she later paired with in Manasantha Nuvve. She also appeared in the Tamil film Minnale alongside Madhavan, which was very successful. Her first Hindi film Hum Ho Gaye Aapke flopped, and she decided to continue working in Tamil cinema. Her appearance in the Tamil film Rendu, again alongside Madhavan, was successful. Audience found her expressions in the film Thimiru cute. Her negative role in Aayirathil Oruvan and Vallavan was highly praised by viewers and critics.

She ended her film career in 2012 after she got married. Her last Bollywood film was Gangs of Wasseypur alongside Manoj Bajpayee, Nawazuddin Siddiqui and Richa Chadda.

=== Music video appearance ===
In 1998, she appeared in the video of the song "Chandni Raatein" sung by Shamsa Kanwal.

== Controversy ==
In April 2006, a Madurai court issued non-bailable warrants against Sen and Shilpa Shetty for "posing in an obscene manner" in photographs published by the Tamil newspaper Dinakaran, owned by Sun Group. The report stated that the two actresses had failed to comply with earlier summons for the same reason, hence the issuance of the warrants. The petitioner submitted that the paper had published "very sexy blow-ups and medium blow-ups" in its December 2005 and January 2006 issues, and which allegedly violated the Indecent Representation of Women (Prohibition) Act 1986, Young Persons (Harmful Publications) Act 1956, and the Indian Penal Code Section 292 (Sale of Obscene Books). The petitioner further demanded that the images should be confiscated under the terms of the Press and Registration of Book Act 1867.

In January 2007, outgoing Chief Justice Y. K. Sabharwal confirmed that Sen had written to him in order to enunciate guidelines against frivolous lawsuits against artists, but declined her plea on the grounds that she should have filed a formal petition instead of writing a letter.

== Filmography ==
Year	Title	Role	Language	Notes	Ref.
2000	Chitram	Janaki	Telugu	Telugu film	
2001	Minnale	Reena Joseph	Tamil	Tamil film; Filmfare Award for Best Female Debut - South	
2001	Bava Nachadu	Lahari	Telugu		
2001	Hum Ho Gaye Aapke	Chandni Gupta	Hindi		
2001	Manasantha Nuvve	Anu (Renu)	Telugu		
2002	Seema Simham	Charulatha	Telugu		
2002	Adrustam	Asha	Telugu		
2002	Bagavathi	Anjali	Tamil		
2003	Dhool	Swapna	Tamil	Nominated - Filmfare Award for Best Supporting Actress – Tamil	
2003	Jaal: The Trap	Anita Choudhary	Hindi		
2003	Veede	Swapna	Telugu		
2003	Neetho Vastha	Asha	Telugu		
2003	Jodi Kya Banayi Wah Wah Ramji	Priyanka	Hindi		
2003	Jay Jay	Herself	Tamil	Special appearance in the song "May Maasam"	
2003	Enakku 20 Unakku 18	Priyanka	Tamil	Guest appearance; Bilingual film	
2003	Nee Manasu Naaku Telusu	Priyanka	Telugu	Guest appearance; Bilingual film	
2004	Anji	Herself	Telugu	Special appearance in the song "Mirapakaya Bajji"	
2004	Aan: Men at Work	Herself	Hindi	Special appearance in the song "Jugnu Ki Payal Bandhi Hai"	
2004	Iti Srikanta	Rajlakshmi	Bengali		
2004	Chellamae	Mythili Ragunandan	Tamil	Nominated - Filmfare Award for Best Actress – Tamil	
2004	Giri	Priya	Tamil		
2005	News	Pooja	Kannada		
2006	Malamaal Weekly	Sukmani	Hindi		
2006	Bangaram	Reporter	Telugu		
2006	Thimiru	Srimathy	Tamil		
2006	Vallavan	Geethakumari “Geetha”	Tamil		
2006	Rendu	Velli	Tamil		
2007	Yamagola Malli Modalayindi	Vaijayanti	Telugu		
2009	Chal Chala Chal	Payal	Hindi		
2010	Aayirathil Oruvan	Anitha Pandian	Tamil	Ananda Vikatan Cinema Awards for Best Villain — Female; Nominated - Filmfare Award for Best Actress – Tamil; Nominated - Vijay Award for Best Actress; Nominated - Vijay Award for Best Villain	
2010	Aakrosh	Jhamunia	Hindi		
2011	Mugguru	Balatripura Sundari	Telugu		
2011	Rajapattai	Herself	Tamil	Special appearance in the song "Rendu Laddu"	
2012	Gangs of Wasseypur – Part 1	Durga	Hindi		
2012	Gangs of Wasseypur – Part 2	Durga	Hindi		
2012	Sattam Oru Iruttarai	Kausalya Raman	Tamil		

== See also ==
- List of Indian film actresses
