= Wasseypur =

- Neighbourhood in Dhanbad
- वासेपुर
- Location in Jharkhand, India Wasseypur (India)
- Coordinates: 23.8083°N 86.4023°E
- Country: India
- State: Jharkhand
- District: Dhanbad district

Government
  - Type: Democracy
  - Body: Dhanbad Municipal Corporation
- Elevation: 304 m (997 ft)

Population (2011)
  - Total: 200,146
- Time zone: UTC+5:30 (IST)

Wasseypur is a neighbourhood locality in the city of Dhanbad in Dhanbad Sadar subdivision of Dhanbad district in the state of Jharkhand in India. Wasseypur was once in Bengal, then in Bihar and is now in Jharkhand. Surrounded by coal rich regions of Dhanbad the area has been rife with mafia activity.

== History ==
The names of rival dons Sabir Alam and Fahim Khan, lords of two mafia are associated with Wasseypur. Despite being out on bail after spending eight years in jail, Sabir Alam rarely stays at home due to the threat to his life. Fahim Khan, who is still alive and in the Ghaghidih Central Jail currently, is the son of Shafiq Khan, a former rival of Suraj Deo Singh.

Wasseypur is a quite famous for its gang wars and mafia activity. Although the gang war has now decreased, the progeny of Fahim Khan and relatives are involved in businesses that often affect normally functioning families in the locality.

== Location ==
Cities, towns and locations in the central portion of Dhanbad Sadar subdivision in Dhanbad district
MC: Municipal Corporation, CT: Census Town, N: Neighbourhood, R: Rural/ Urban centre
Owing to space constraints in the small map, the actual locations in a larger map may vary slightly

Wasseypur is located at 23.8083°N 86.4023°E.

Note: The map alongside presents some of the able locations in the area. All places marked in the map are linked in the larger full screen map.

Wasseypur is about 165 km from state capital Ranchi. It was combined with other urban units to form Dhanbad Municipal Corporation in 2006. It is part of Ward No. 17 of Dhanbad Municipal Corporation.

The neighborhood features undulating uplands bustling with coalmines in the lowest rung of the Chota Nagpur Plateau. The entire area shown in the map is under Dhanbad Municipal Corporation, except Belgaria which is under Baliapur (community development block). The places in the DMC area are marked as neighbourhoods. The DMC area shown in the map is around the core area of Dhanbad city. Another major area of DMC is shown in the map of the southern portion of the district. A small stretch of DMC, extending up to Katras is shown in the map of the western portion. The region is fully urbanised. Jharia (community development block) has been merged into DMC. Three operational areas of BCCL operate fully within the region – Sijua Area, Kusunda Area and Bastacola Area.

== In popular culture ==
The area is central to the plot of the popular Bollywood two-part crime film Gangs of Wasseypur – Part 1 and Gangs of Wasseypur – Part 2.
