= Gangs of Wasseypur =

2012 Indian film by Anurag Kashyap

- Theatrical release poster
- Directed by: Anurag Kashyap
- Written by: Akhilesh Jaiswal; Anurag Kashyap; Sachin K. Ladia
- Story by: Zeishan Quadri
- Produced by: Anurag Kashyap; Sunil Bohra; Viacom18 Motion Pictures
- Starring: Manoj Bajpayee; Richa Chadha; Reema Sen; Piyush Mishra; Nawazuddin Siddiqui; Jaideep Ahlawat; Vineet Kumar Singh; Pankaj Tripathi; Jameel Khan; Huma Qureshi; Anurita Jha; Tigmanshu Dhulia
- Narrated by: Piyush Mishra
- Cinematography: Rajeev Ravi
- Edited by: Shweta Venkat Matthew
- Music by: Songs: Sneha Khanwalkar; Piyush Mishra; Score: G. V. Prakash Kumar
- Production companies: Viacom18 Motion Pictures; Tipping Point Films; AKFPL; Phantom Films; Bohra Bros
- Distributed by: Viacom18 Motion Pictures
- Release dates: May 2012 (Cannes); 22 June 2012 (India)
- Running time: 160 minutes
- Country: India
- Language: Hindi
- Budget: ₹9.2 crore
- Box office: est. ₹35.13 crore

Gangs of Wasseypur (Note: Stylised as Gangs of वासेपुर.) is a 2012 Indian Hindi-language epic crime film directed by Anurag Kashyap, and written by Kashyap and Zeishan Quadri. It precedes Part 2 as the first of the two-part film, centred on the coal mafia of Dhanbad, and the underlying power struggles, politics and vengeance between three crime families from 1941 to the mid-1990s. Gangs of Wasseypur stars an ensemble cast, featuring Manoj Bajpayee, Richa Chadha, Reema Sen, Piyush Mishra, Nawazuddin Siddiqui, Vineet Kumar Singh, Pankaj Tripathi, Huma Qureshi, Anurita Jha and Tigmanshu Dhulia.

Although both parts were shot as a single film measuring a total of 319 minutes, no Indian theatre would screen a five-hour film, so it was divided into two parts. Gangs of Wasseypur was screened in its entirety at the 2012 Cannes Directors' Fortnight. It was also screened at the Sundance Film Festival in January 2013. It was filmed in Varanasi, Bihar, and Chunar, with these settings inspiring the film's soundtrack, which consists mainly of Indian folk.

The film was theatrically released on 22 June 2012, but was banned in Kuwait and Qatar for violent content. Upon release, Gangs of Wasseypur received widespread critical acclaim, and won a number of awards. It received nominations for Best Film and Best Director for Kashyap at the 55th Asia-Pacific Film Festival, and won for Best Audiography at the 60th National Film Awards, while Siddiqui won a Special Mention for acting at the same ceremony. Gangs of Wasseypur also won four Filmfare Awards, including the Critics Award for Best Film, while Chadda won the Critics Award for Best Actress, at the 58th Filmfare Awards.

== Plot ==
During British colonial rule, the colonial administration seizes agricultural land in Dhanbad to establish large-scale industrial coal mines. In the neighbouring village of Wasseypur, power is concentrated in the hands of the elite Qureshi butcher clan, who enforce strict dominance over the local populace. In 1941, a Pashtun labourer named Shahid Khan is banished from Wasseypur after he is caught impersonating Sultana Daku, a revered Qureshi bandit known for plundering British freight trains.

Shahid relocates his family to Dhanbad to work as an exploited labourer in the coal pits. When his pregnant wife goes into labour, the mine's abusive overseer denies Shahid leave, leading to her death. In retaliation, an enraged Shahid beats the overseer to death and flees. Following Indian Independence in 1947, the British-held mines transition into the hands of domestic industrialists. Shahid finds employment as an armed security enforcer for an ambitious aspiring industrialist and union figure, Ramadhir Singh. Sensing that Shahid’s rising clout and brazen ambitions will eventually threaten his own ascendancy, Ramadhir conspires to eliminate him, hiring a hitman named Yadav to assassinate him. To wipe out the bloodline, Ehsaan Qureshi is dispatched to murder Shahid's surviving kin. However, Shahid’s young son, Sardar Khan, escapes the purge with his uncle Nasir. Upon learning the details of his father's death, Sardar shaves his head and swears an oath to never grow his hair until he avenges Shahid by destroying Ramadhir Singh.

By 1965, Ramadhir enters electoral politics, converting his strong-arm control over the labour unions into immense political leverage. Following the nationalisation of Indian coal mines in 1972, Ramadhir cements his unchallenged dominion over Dhanbad by orchestrating the assassination of an uncooperative government official who attempts to curb mafia control. Meanwhile, a grown-up Sardar Khan marries Nagma Khatoon and fathers three sons: Danish, Faizal, and Babua. Tolerant of Sardar's hyperactive libido and erratic impulses, Nagma overlooks his extramarital excursions. Operating beneath the radar, Sardar, his cousin Asgar, and Nasir gain employment under Ramadhir’s son while covertly looting Ramadhir's fuel depots and coal-transit trains. When Sardar is arrested during an operational misstep, Ramadhir discovers his identity and realises that Shahid Khan's rightful heir has survived and is actively undermining his empire.

In 1979, Sardar and Asgar stage a daring prison escape. Seeking shelter in Wasseypur, they ally with a community elder and political figure, Qamar Makhdoomi. During this period, Sardar pursues and marries a Bengali woman named Durga, establishing a second household. Entering the 1980s, Wasseypur is administratively incorporated into Dhanbad. The Qureshi syndicate, now spearheaded by the volatile and ruthless Sultan, continues to torment the non-Qureshi Muslim population. Makhdoomi enlists Sardar's muscle to neutralise Qureshi hegemony. Sardar unleashes a wave of bombing campaigns against Qureshi businesses, butcher shops, and criminal strongholds. The onslaught effectively establishes Sardar as the premier gang leader of the region, eclipsing the Qureshis. Sardar briefly reconciles with Nagma, but when she becomes pregnant once more, a frustrated Sardar returns to Durga's home, where she gives birth to his fourth son, Definite.

Viewing Sardar's rapidly burgeoning syndicate as an existential threat, Ramadhir and Sultan form a tactical alliance. Ramadhir promises access to political protection and military-grade automatic firearms in exchange for the Qureshis neutralising Sardar. By 1989, the regional mafia shifts focus from small-scale coal theft to high-stakes government development tenders. Sardar secures a monopoly over sand-mine-filling contracts, drives the Qureshi clan entirely out of Wasseypur, and diversifies his portfolio into illegal scrap-iron racketeering. His eldest son, Danish, joins the family syndicate as an active enforcer.

Sardar dispatches his reclusive, marijuana-addicted second son, Faizal, to Varanasi to procure illicit weaponry, but Faizal is intercepted and arrested by the police. Following his release from jail, a vengeful Faizal tracks down the arms dealer, Yadav, and executes him, unaware that Yadav was the hitman who assassinated his grandfather, Shahid Khan. Seeking stability and an end to the protracted gang war, Danish approaches Sultan’s uncle, Badoor Qureshi, and brokers a truce. Defying Sultan’s violent objections, Danish successfully marries Sultan's sister, Shama Parveen.

Simultaneously, Faizal pursues a courtship with Mohsina Hamid, a relative of the Qureshi family. While heavily intoxicated on marijuana, Faizal offhandedly confides to his close associate, Fazlu, that Sardar plans to travel alone the following morning without his usual armed escort. Looking for a lucrative payout, Fazlu leaks the travel route to Sultan and the Qureshi faction. The next morning, Sultan and a squad of gunmen ambush Sardar’s car at a remote fuel station, unleashing a coordinated barrage of gunfire. A mortally wounded Sardar staggers out of the vehicle and collapses onto the road, succumbing to his wounds.

== Cast ==
- Manoj Bajpayee as Sardar Khan, Shahid Khan's only son
- Jaideep Ahlawat as Shahid Khan
- Nawazuddin Siddiqui as Faizal Khan
- Richa Chadha as Nagma Khatoon, Sardar's first wife
- Piyush Mishra as Nasir, Shahid Khan's servant
- Jameel Khan as Asghar Khan,
- Reema Sen as Durga
- Huma Qureshi as Mohsina Hamid
- Zeishan Quadri as Definite Khan
- Vineet Kumar Singh as Danish Khan
- Tigmanshu Dhulia as Ramadhir Singh
- Pankaj Tripathi as Sultan Qureshi
- Satyakam Anand as J. P. Singh,
- Vipin Sharma as Ehsan Qureshi
- Pramod Pathak as Sultana Daku / Badoor Qureshi
- Harish Khanna as Yadav ji
- Anurita Jha as Shama Parveen
- Sanjay Singh as Fazlu, Faisal's friend
- Rajkummar Rao as Shamshad Alam
- Vasan Bala in song Bhoos
- Aditya Kumar as Babu "Babua" Khan ("Perpendicular")
- Yashpal Sharma as Occasional Singer (Guest Appearance)
- Vicky Kaushal as silhouette bystander (Cameo Role)

== Production ==
=== Development ===
Anurag Kashyap said he had wanted to make a film on Bihar with the name Bihar for some time, but for various reasons it didn't take off. In 2008, he met Zeishan Quadri, who would then go on to write the script of the film, after he discussed with him Wasseypur's story. He found it unreal to believe that mafia activity and gang war existed at such a high level, and what really attracted him was not gang war but the entire story of the emergence of the mafia. According to him, to tell the story through a few families is what interested him but that also meant a longer reel. "We all know mafia exists but what they do, how they operate, why they do we don't know and that is something which forms the basis of the film".

=== Casting ===
According to Bajpayee, the role of Sardar Khan is the most negative role he has done till date. His motivation for doing this role came from the fact that there was "something new" with the character of Sardar Khan. Piyush Mishra and Tigmanshu Dhulia were given the discretion to decide who, among them, would perform the roles of Nasir and Ramadhir. Mishra chose the role of Nasir and Dhulia portrayed Ramadhir Singh. Chadda revealed in an interview that this role helped her bag 11 film roles. This was Huma Qureshi's first film, and she characterised this as her "dream debut". Qureshi landed this role after director Anurag Kashyap spotted her in a Samsung commercial he was directing.

=== Filming ===
Major portions of the film were shot in the state of Uttar Pradesh, mainly in the district of Sonbhadra Varanasi. Shooting also took place in Anpara, Obra Chunar. During filming in Varanasi in December 2010, the film's chief assistant director, Sohil Shah, died while performing one of the stunt shot scenes. The movie was dedicated to Sohil Shah, as is seen in the opening titles. The film finished production in late March 2011.

The production cost was ₹18.4 crore. Anurag Kashyap has said that it is his most expensive film, and he reportedly had to spend ₹ 15 crore on paying the actors. However, he has tweeted that "45 crore as reported in the media is false."

== Themes and portrayals ==
=== Style ===
The filming style adopted by Anurag Kashyap in Gangs of Wasseypur bears a striking similarity to the styles of Sam Peckinpah. The scenes are short in length, several in number and often a series of montages take the story forward. Anurag Kashyap never has to resort to extraneous elements like stylised entries, editing patterns or camera motions to add to the effect because the story has an intrinsic impact of its own. However the film doesn't fall short of any technical finesse. There's unabashed blood, gore and abuse wherever the scene demands.

Lines like "Tum sahi ho, woh marad hai," ("You are right, he is male") said in resigned agreement to a wronged wife stand out for their cruel truths of rural life. Kashyap's use of occasional bursts of music and comedy to punctuate the slowly augmenting tension at different junctures is highly reminiscent of Spaghetti Westerns. Kashyap's use of dark humour to judiciously propagate violence bears an uncanny similarity to Quentin Tarantino's style of movie-making. Absorbing styles as diverse as those of old-school Italo-American mafia classics a la Coppola, Scorsese and Leone, as well as David Michod's taut crime thriller Animal Kingdom, Kashyap never lets his influences override the distinct Indian colour. The pacing is machine-gun relentless, sweeping incoherence and repetitiveness under the carpet as it barrels forward with hypnotic speed.

=== Theme ===
" The film is essentially about two families from Wasseypur and one from Dhanbad. In the process, it explores the larger chunk of the coal and mafia activity. The film deals with the emergence of the Mafia. I didn't want to limit to coal activity so the family story had to be shown and what the mafia is doing there now. What we have done with this film is even if it's a fictional film we have taken actual shots of sand mining. In the film, nothing is recreated. Everything here is real shots. The entire river has been turned into a sand mine as there is not an ounce of water. "

— Kashyap on the theme of the film

The movie chronicles the journey of the saga associated with coal mines. It portrays the gang lords of Wasseypur like Shafi Khan, Faheem Khan and Shabir Alam. The film has also been inspired from the story of rivals Shafi Khan and Surya Dev Singh. Rajeev Masand of CNN-IBN calls the movie, a gang warfare and notes that "On the surface, Gangs of Wasseypur is a revenge saga, a tableau of vengeance between generations of gangsters. Scratch that surface and you'll discover more than just a grim portrait". While some of the critics noted that the film, is a powerful political film, which underlines the party politics system (at that time) allowing the growth of illegal coal trading and mafias in the region (Bihar) and their use as a political tool, thus making the allotment of coal blocks, one of the most powerful expressions of controlling power in the region. Despite its grim theme, the film also has an inherent sense of humour that comes quite naturally to it from its series of events. The scene where Reema Sen is charmed by Manoj Bajpai over her daily chores or the one where Nawazuddin goes on a formal date with Huma Qureshi are outrageously hilarious. The household politics is one of the many subplots rendering layers to the story. You realise Sardar's family is emerging into a Corleone set-up of sorts. His sons - the brooding Danish and the doped-out Faizal (Nawazuddin Siddiqui) from Nagma, and the enigmatic Definite Khan (Zeishan Quadri) from Durga - will become key players in this revenge story. Violent as his screenplay is, Kashyap reveals wit while narrating his tale. Ample black comedy is used to imagine the gang war milieu. The humour lets us relate to the intrinsic irreverent nature of men who live by the gun. Character development can best justify the length of Gangs of Wasseypur.

== Music ==
The soundtrack album of the two-part compilation of Gangs of Wasseypur has 27 songs, composed by Sneha Khanwalkar and Piyush Mishra, with lyrics by Mishra and Varun Grover. However, the album was split up according to the film's release. Gangs of Wasseypur has 14 songs which were released on 1 June 2012. The film's soundtrack is heavily influenced by traditional Indian folk songs. The film score is composed by Tamil composer G. V. Prakash Kumar.

The audio launch of this film took place in a unique way at a road show event, held in the streets of Mumbai, where Manoj Bajpayee, Huma Qureshi and Anurag Kashyap, had driven a jeep around the suburbs and the team danced on the streets wearing red gamuchas and has been making public appearances in them ever since.

== Marketing ==
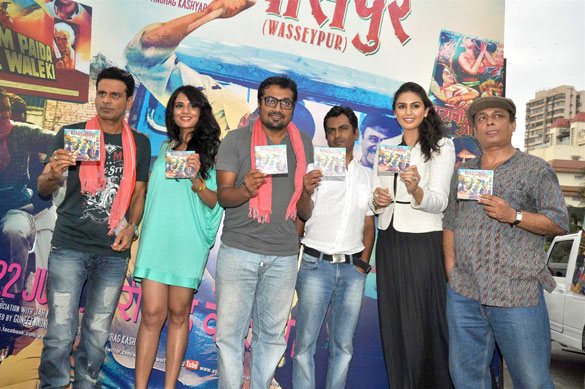
Cast of the film, along with director Kashyap at the audio release of the film in Patna

The marketing of Gangs of Wasseypur was noted for its uniqueness. Gamchha, a thin traditional East Indian towel was taken to Cannes, the Gangs of Wasseypur team danced on the streets wearing red gamchhas, after the Cannes Film Festival and has been making public appearances in them ever since. While most music launches in India happen with a big party in a 5-star banquet hall in Delhi or Mumbai, and formal announcements before the press, the music of this film, was launched in Patna.

Gangs of Wasseypur mementos — The Gangs of Wasseypur team has made a memento consisting of bullets of a different era. While all sorts of weapons have been used in the film, this is the best thing one could give as a memento.

== Reception ==
=== Critical reception ===
On the review aggregator website Rotten Tomatoes, 94% of 32 critics' reviews are positive, with an average rating of 9.1/10.

India

Bikas Bhagat of Zee News gave the movie 4 stars out of 5, concluding that "So if you want to experience an all new wave of cinema in Bollywood, Gangs of Wasseypur is your movie. It has some really quirky moments which I'll leave for you to explore in the film. Watch it for its sheer cinematic pleasure!"

Subhash K. Jha of IANS gave the movie 4 out of 5 stars, saying that "Brutal, brilliant, dark, sinister, terrifying in its violence and yet savagely funny in the way human life is disregarded Gangs of Wasseypur is one helluva romp into the raw and rugged heartland. Not to be missed." Taran Adarsh of Bollywood Hungama gave the movie 3.5 stars out of 5, saying that "On the whole, Gangs of Wasseypur symbolizes the fearless new Indian cinema that shatters the clichés and conventional formulas, something which Anurag Kashyap has come to be acknowledged for. It has all the trappings of an entertainer, but with a difference. The film prides itself with the substance that connects with enthusiasts of new-age cinema. But, I wish to restate, one needs to have a really strong belly to soak up to a film like Gangs of Wasseypur. Also, this striking movie-watching experience comes with a colossal length and duration. The reactions, therefore, would be in extremes. Gangs of Wasseypur is for that segment of spectators who seek pleasure in watching forceful, hard-hitting and gritty movies."

Rajeev Masand of CNN-IBN gave the movie 3.5 stars out of 5, concluding that "Bolstered by its riveting performances and its thrilling plot dynamics, this is a gripping film that seizes your full attention. I'm going with three-and-a-half out of five for Anurag Kashyap's Gangs of Wasseypur. Despite its occasionally indulgent narrative, this bullet-ridden saga is worthy of a repeat viewing, if only to catch all its nuances. Don't miss it." Mansha Rastogi of Now Running gave the movie 3.5 stars out of 5, commenting that "Gangs of Wasseypur works like an explosive leaving you wanting for more. Gangs of Wasseypur – Part 2 will definitely be a film eagerly awaited! Devour part one in the meantime!"

Madhureeta Mukherjee of The Times of India gave the movie 3.5 stars out of 5, saying that "Director Anurag Kashyap, in his trademark style of story- telling – realistic, with strong characters, over-the-top sequences, and unadulterated local flavour (crude maa-behen gaalis galore), gruesome bloody violence and raw humour – interestingly spins this twisted tale. This first of a two-part film, is ambitious indeed; showing promise of brilliance in parts, but not bullet-proof to flaws. With a runtime this long, meandering side tracks and random sub-plots, countless characters, documentary-style narrative backed with black and white montages from actual history, it loses blood in the second half because of the Director's over-(self)indulgence. So, hold on to your guns, gamchas and 'womaniyas'."

Saibal Chatterjee of NDTV gave the movie 3.5 stars out of 5, concluding that "It may not be for the faint-hearted and the prissy. Gangs of Wasseypur is a heavyweight knockout punch. You're down for the count!" Blessy Chettiar of DNA gave the movie 3.5 stars out of 5, commenting that "Even though there's so much going for Part 1, there's something always amiss, something that leaves you underwhelmed after all those expectations. May be its a hope of a dashing Part 2. Let's wait and watch."

On the contrary, Raja Sen of Rediff gave the movie 2.5 stars out of 5, concluding that "It is the excess that suffocates all the magic, originality dying out for lack of room to breathe. Kashyap gets flavour, setting and character right, but the lack of economy cripples the film. There is a lot of gunfire, but like the fine actors populating its sets, Wasseypur fires too many blanks."

Mayank Shekhar of theW14.com said, "Most movies have a definite beginning (starting point), middle (turning point) and end (high point), or what playwrights call the three-act structure in a script. There doesn't seem to be one here, at least on the face of it. The genre it comes closest to then is an epic, spelt with a capital E, along the lines of saying Francis Ford Coppola's Godfather trilogy, or this film's immediate inspiration Martin Scorsese's Gangs of New York (2002). And, of course, it is like all mythologies are supposed to be. You enjoy them for the parts rather than caring merely for the hero's final goal. If it wasn't a film, this would’ve been a stylised graphic novel. But you would’ve missed a memorable background score and striking sound design."

International

The film met positive international reviews. Deborah Young of The Hollywood Reporter called the film "an extraordinary ride through Bollywood's spectacular, over-the-top filmmaking". Referring to the violence and pace of the film she says "Gangs of Wasseypur puts Tarantino in a corner with its cool command of cinematically inspired and referenced violence, ironic characters and breathless pace". Maggie Lee of Variety notes Kashyap never lets his diverse influences of old-school Italo-American mafia classics a la Coppola, Scorsese and Leone, as well as David Michod's taut crime thriller "Animal Kingdom," override the distinct Indian colour. Calling the film "the love child of Bollywood and Hollywood," she felt the film was "by turns pulverizing and poetic in its depiction of violence." Lee Marshall of Screen International writes "the script alternates engagingly between scenes of sometimes stomach-churning violence and moments of domestic comedy, made more tasty by hard-boiled lines of dialogue like "in Wasseypur even the pigeons fly with one wing, because they need the other to cover their arse". He describes song lyrics "as if mouthed by a Greek chorus of street punks" commenting sarcastically on what's happening onscreen.

=== Box office ===
Gangs of Wasseypur collected ₹10.63 crore in the first weekend and ₹17.70 crore in the first week. Gangs of Wasseypur grossed ₹35.13 crore total worldwide.

The success party for the film was held at Escobar in Bandra, Mumbai on Thursday, 5 July, late evening.

Gangs of Wasseypur was re-released in Indian theatres on 28 February 2025 by PVR Cinemas.

=== Impact ===
Gangs Of Wasseypur’s success led to a number of Hindi movies across the next few years that were essentially inelegant variations on the “hinterland gangsters” theme.

Quotes from the film often make their way into everyday slang and have appear in numerous films.

== Awards and nominations ==
Award	Date of ceremony (Note: Each date is linked to the article about the awards held that year, wherever possible.)	Category	Recipients	Result	Ref
Asia-Pacific Film Festival	15 December 2012	Best Actor	Manoj Bajpayee	Nominated	
Asia-Pacific Film Festival	15 December 2012	Jury Grand Prize	Anurag Kashyap	Won	
BIG Star Entertainment Awards	31 December 2012	Best Debut - Female	Huma Qureshi	Won	
Filmfare Awards	20 January 2013	Best Film	Gangs of Wasseypur	Nominated	
Filmfare Awards	20 January 2013	Best Film (Critics)	Gangs of Wasseypur	Won	
Filmfare Awards	20 January 2013	Best Director	Anurag Kashyap	Nominated	
Filmfare Awards	20 January 2013	Best Actor	Manoj Bajpayee	Nominated	
Filmfare Awards	20 January 2013	Best Supporting Actress	Richa Chadha	Nominated	
Filmfare Awards	20 January 2013	Best Actress (Critics)	Richa Chadha	Won	
Filmfare Awards	20 January 2013	Best Female Debut	Huma Qureshi	Nominated	
Filmfare Awards	20 January 2013	Best Music Director	Sneha Khanwalkar	Nominated	
Filmfare Awards	20 January 2013	Best Dialogue	Anurag Kashyap, Zeishan Quadri, Akhilesh & Sachin Ladia	Won	
Filmfare Awards	20 January 2013	Best Action	Sham Kaushal	Won	
International Indian Film Academy Awards	6 July 2013	Best Film	Gangs of Wasseypur	Nominated	
International Indian Film Academy Awards	6 July 2013	Best Director	Anurag Kashyap	Nominated	
International Indian Film Academy Awards	6 July 2013	Best Actor	Manoj Bajpayee	Nominated	
International Indian Film Academy Awards	6 July 2013	Best Actress	Huma Qureshi	Nominated	
International Indian Film Academy Awards	6 July 2013	Best Supporting Actor	Nawazuddin Siddiqui	Nominated	
International Indian Film Academy Awards	6 July 2013	Best Supporting Actress	Reema Sen	Nominated	
International Indian Film Academy Awards	6 July 2013	Best Performance in a Negative Role	Tigmanshu Dhulia	Nominated	
International Indian Film Academy Awards	6 July 2013	Best Story	Zeishan Quadri	Nominated	
International Indian Film Academy Awards	6 July 2013	Best Music Director	Sneha Khanwalkar	Nominated	
International Indian Film Academy Awards	6 July 2013	Best Dialogue	Anurag Kashyap, Zeishan Quadri, Akhilesh & Sachin Ladia	Won	
International Indian Film Academy Awards	6 July 2013	Best Action	Sham Kaushal	Won	
National Film Awards	3 May 2013	Best Audiography	Alok De, Sinoy Joseph & Sreejesh Nair	Won	
National Film Awards	3 May 2013	Special Jury Award (Note: Also won for his performances in Kahaani, Dekh Indian Circus, and Talaash: The Answer Lies Within.)	Nawazuddin Siddiqui	Won	
Screen Awards	12 January 2013	Best Film	Gangs of Wasseypur	Nominated	
Screen Awards	12 January 2013	Best Director	Anurag Kashyap	Nominated	
Screen Awards	12 January 2013	Best Actor	Manoj Bajpayee	Nominated	
Screen Awards	12 January 2013	Best Supporting Actor	Jameel Khan	Nominated	
Screen Awards	12 January 2013	Supporting Actress	Richa Chadha	Nominated	
Screen Awards	12 January 2013	Best Female Debut	Huma Qureshi	Nominated	
Screen Awards	12 January 2013	Best Villain	Tigmanshu Dhulia	Won	
Screen Awards	12 January 2013	Best Ensemble Cast	Gangs of Wasseypur	Won	
Screen Awards	12 January 2013	Best Dialogue	Anurag Kashyap, Zeishan Quadri, Akhilesh & Sachin Ladia	Nominated	
Screen Awards	12 January 2013	Best Editing	Shweta Venkat Matthew	Nominated	
Screen Awards	12 January 2013	Best Cinematography	Rajeev Ravi	Nominated	
Screen Awards	12 January 2013	Best Sound Design	Kunal Sharma, Alok De	Nominated	
Screen Awards	12 January 2013	Best Production Design	Wasiq Khan	Nominated	
Screen Awards	12 January 2013	Best Costume	Subodh Srivastava	Nominated	
Screen Awards	12 January 2013	Best Action	Sham Kaushal	Won	

== Historical accuracy ==
The film mainly draws its story from the real life gang wars that took place in the region of Dhanbad, Jharkhand.

Most of the gang wars were between the Muslim gangs of Wasseypur, notably between Fahim Khan gang and Sabir Khan gang, not with the Singhs, who had been majorly instrumental in instigating these wars, but never participated in them. The character of Ramadhir Singh is based on the powerful coal mafia don-turned politician Suryadeo Singh. There was no character akin to Shahid Khan.

In the film, Sardar Khan marries the Bengali girl but in real life, the woman was maintained as a mistress. In one scene, a Muslim girl is kidnapped by Singh's men. In real life, the victim was a local Hindu girl and the kidnappers were a few goons from Wasseypur. The members of the Singh family ultimately had to threaten the entire Wasseypur community to return the girl in 24 hours. The girl was eventually returned as the Singhs were regarded in the village with might and fear.
