= Marudhar Express (film) =

- Theatrical release poster
- Directed by: Vishal Mishra
- Written by: Vishal Mishra; Aabhar Dadhich
- Produced by: Raj Kushwaha; Pramod Gore
- Starring: Kunaal Roy Kapur; Tara Alisha Berry; Rajesh Sharma
- Cinematography: AKN Sabastian
- Edited by: Ballu Saluja
- Music by: Jeet Gannguli; Shamir Tandon
- Production companies: Raywings Entertainment; Atharva Motion Pictures
- Distributed by: Shemaroo Entertainment
- Release date: 5 July 2019
- Running time: 115 minutes
- Country: India
- Language: Hindi

Marudhar Express is a 2019 Indian romantic comedy film directed by Vishal Mishra. The film stars Kunaal Roy Kapur, Tara Alisha Berry and Rajesh Sharma. The film is set and shot in Kanpur, Uttar Pradesh.

The film has an eccentric proposition, it's a story about an arranged marriage couple who comes under the pressure of childbirth right after they are wedded. The film is loaded with humour, emotions and the reality of certain struggles faced after marriage.

The film was earlier titled as, Hum Dono Honge Kaamyaab. The film was released in cinemas on 5 July 2019.

== Plot ==
Marudhar (Kunaal Roy Kapur) is the son of his tyrant father, Ashok Pandey (Rajesh Sharma). Straight as an arrow and boring as an oyster, Marudhar trudges along in his life, one hopeless day after the other. But Ashok has marriage plans for him and he won't have no for an answer. What follows is a comedy of ridiculous proportions as Marudhar marries the sweet and pretty Chitra (Tara Alisha Berry) from Lucknow. With no experience in dealing with women, let alone a wife, Marudhar embarks on an emotional and equally hilarious journey as he tries to find his feet amidst love, life and family.

== Cast ==
- Kunaal Roy Kapur as Marudhar
- Tara Alisha Berry as Chitra
- Rajesh Sharma as Marudhar's father, Ashok Pandey

== Soundtrack ==
Marudhar Express

Soundtrack album by Jeet Gannguli and Shamir Tandon
- Released: 10 October 2018
- Recorded: 2018
- Genre: Feature film soundtrack
- Length: 30:56
- Language: Hindi
- Label: Zee Music Company

The music was composed by Jeet Gannguli and Shamir Tandon with lyrics written by Manoj Muntashir, Rashmi Virag, Vishal Mishra and Sameer Anjaan.

No.	Title	Lyrics	Singer(s)	Length
1.	"Tujhse Pehle Tujhse Zyada"	Manoj Muntashir	Jeet Gannguli	4:01
2.	"Tum Chale Gaye" (Male)	Rashmi Virag	Yasser Desai	4:54
3.	"Chaasni Si"	Vishal Mishra	Yasser Desai, Jeet Gannguli	4:05
4.	"Mirza Ve" (Male)	Manoj Muntashir	Sonu Nigam, Jeet Gannguli	3:25
5.	"Balma Aisa Na Nikale" (Music by Shamir Tandon)	Sameer Anjaan	Aakanksha Sharma	6:40
6.	"Mirza Ve" (Female)	Manoj Muntashir	Asees Kaur	2:55
7.	"Tum Chale Gaye" (Female)	Rashmi Virag	Aakanksha Sharma	4:54
Total length:				30:56
