= Satyakam Anand =

Indian actor (born 1977)

- Born: Satyakam Anand; 11 July 1977 (age 49); Arrah, Bihar, India
- Occupation: Film actor
- Years active: 2009–present
- Known for: Gangs of Wasseypur (2012)
- Television: Mere Sai: Shraddha Aur Saburi

Satyakam Anand (born 11 July 1977) is an Indian actor, known for working in Bollywood. He tried to get admission into National School of Drama for three years, but remained unsuccessful for different reasons. He made his debut with the film, Dvandva (2009). Later, he appeared in films like Gangs of Wasseypur (2012), Shorts (2013) and Masaan. In 2020, he appeared in a TV show called "Mere Sai". He also worked in a movie Sherni (2021) along with Vidya Balan and Vijay Raj.

== Early life ==
Satyakam was born in a small town Arrah in Bihar. At the age of 19, he started theatre and took part in almost all major drama/theatre competitions that were conducted all over North India.
