= Gangs of Wasseypur 2 =

2012 Indian film by Anurag Kashyap

- Theatrical release poster
- Directed by: Anurag Kashyap
- Written by: Zeishan Quadri; Akhilesh Jaiswal; Sachin Ladia; Anurag Kashyap
- Produced by: Guneet Monga; Anurag Kashyap; Sunil Bohra
- Starring: Nawazuddin Siddiqui; Manoj Bajpayee; Richa Chadha; Huma Qureshi; Reema Sen; Anurita Jha; Piyush Mishra; Jameel Khan; Vineet Kumar Singh; Pankaj Tripathi; Zeishan Quadri; Aditya Kumar; Rajkumar Rao; Tigmanshu Dhulia
- Narrated by: Piyush Mishra
- Cinematography: Rajeev Ravi
- Edited by: Shweta Venkat
- Music by: Songs: Sneha Khanwalkar; Piyush Mishra; Score: G. V. Prakash Kumar
- Production companies: Tipping Point Films; AKFPL; Phantom Films; Bohra Bros; Jar Pictures
- Distributed by: Viacom18 Motion Pictures
- Release dates: May 2012 (Cannes); 8 August 2012
- Running time: 159 minutes
- Country: India
- Language: Hindi
- Budget: ₹9.20 crores
- Box office: est. ₹22.04 crore

Gangs of Wasseypur 2 (Note: Stylised as Gangs of वासेपुर: II.) is a 2012 Indian Hindi-language crime film co-written, produced and directed by Anurag Kashyap. It follows Part 1 as the second of the two-part film, centered on the coal mafia of Dhanbad, Jharkhand and the underlying power struggles, and dynamics of politics and vengeance between three crime families. Part two features an ensemble cast with Nawazuddin Siddiqui, Manoj Bajpayee, Richa Chadha, Huma Qureshi, Reema Sen, Piyush Mishra, Pankaj Tripathi, Zeishan Quadri, Rajkumar Rao and Tigmanshu Dhulia in major roles. Its story spans from the 1990s to 2009.

Both parts were originally shot as a 319-minute single film and screened at the 2012 Cannes Directors' Fortnight but since no Indian theatre would volunteer to screen a five-plus hour movie, it was divided into two parts (160 mins and 159 mins respectively) for the Indian market.

The film received an Adults Only certification from the Indian Censor Board and is unusually explicit for Indian standards in both language and violence. The film's soundtrack is heavily influenced by traditional Indian folk songs, tending to be philosophical and liberal with its heavy use of sexual innuendos. Gangs of Wasseypur 2 was released on 8 August 2012 across India and had some paid previews on 7 August 2012.

Both parts of the film were acclaimed by the critics upon release. The combined film won the Best Audiography, Re-recordist's of the Final Mixed Track (Alok De, Sinoy Joseph and Shreejesh Nair) and Special Mention for acting (Nawazuddin Siddiqui) at the 60th National Film Awards. The film won four Filmfare Awards, including Best Film (Critics) and Best Actress (Critics), at the 58th Filmfare Awards. The individual film was declared flop at box-office, although the meagre combined budget of ₹18.5 crore allowed the two parts to be cumulatively commercially successful, with net domestic earnings of ₹50.81 crore. It is regarded by many as a modern cult film.

== Plot ==
Following the assassination of Sardar Khan, his sons Danish and Faizal, along with their uncle Asgar, track down and execute two of the hitmen involved in the ambush. While planning the retaliation, Danish surrenders for doing illegal wood mining and gets cleared of his charges with a small amount of fine. However, Danish is gunned down on the steps of the local courthouse by Qureshi clan chief Sultan and a treacherous associate, Fazlu. At the funeral, a devastated Nagma Khatoon openly questions the resolve and capability of her son, Faizal. Spurred by her grief, a stone-faced Faizal vows absolute vengeance against everyone responsible for the deaths of his father and brothern of Sardar Khan.

Faizal launches his campaign of retribution by tricking Fazlu under the pretense of offering congratulations for his recent local election victory, only to trap and brutally behead him. The gruesome killing cements Faizal's reputation across the underworld, allowing him to consolidate undisputed control over the region's lucrative illegal scrap iron rackets. To safeguard his expanding empire, Faizal negotiates a pragmatic truce with Ramadhir Singh, agreeing to suspend the long-standing blood feud in exchange for political immunity. During this period, Faizal marries his longtime sweetheart, Mohsina Hamid, and subsequently hunts down and executes the third assassin involved in Sardar’s murder, completing his direct revenge.

By 2003, Faizal partners with an ambitious businessman, Shamshad Alam, to maximize profits from the illegal scrap iron trade. However, when Faizal discovers that Shamshad has been secretly skimming and embezzling significant portions of the syndicate's revenue, their relationship fractures. Fearing Faizal's violent retribution, Shamshad defects to the authorities, providing wiretapped audio recordings that document Faizal's illicit operations. Concurrently, local merchants—exhausted and terrorized by the reckless, violent antics of Faizal's younger brother, Perpendicular—contract Sultan to eliminate him. Compounding the regional instability, Ramadhir’s political influence begins to crumble due to the administrative incompetence of his son, J.P. Singh. In December 2003, Sultan's assassins ambush and murder Perpendicular. When an emotionally wrecked Faizal attempts to retrieve his brother's body from the scene, the police intervene and arrest him.

With Faizal incarcerated, his half-brother, Definite, launches a preemptive strike against Shamshad before he can exploit the power vacuum. During the attempt, Definite’s firearm jams, forcing him to flee from Shamshad's pursuing enforcers. Desperate to escape, Definite leaps into a train compartment filled with military personnel, leading to his immediate detention. In prison, Faizal cautions Definite that Ramadhir and Shamshad will try to exploit Definite's mother, Durga, to sow discord and spark an internal civil war within the Khan family. Taking the warning to heart, Definite secures bail and promptly launches a grenade attack on Shamshad's office, blowing off Shamshad's leg. Sultan narrowly escapes the explosion and pursues Definite back to the Khan household. Upon arriving, an incensed Sultan discovers his own estranged sister, Shama—who had married Danish—and shoots her, leaving her comatose in critical condition.

Following Faizal's release from prison in January 2004, J.P. advises Sultan to execute a decisive, preemptive assault to wipe out the Khans once and for all. Sultan mobilizes an armed raid on the Khan residence, but the family manages to escape the siege. As Sultan's squad retreats from the area, they walk into a police ambush at a checkpoint, realizing too late that J.P. has double-crossed them; despite heavy casualties, Sultan manages to flee the firefight. Shortly thereafter, Sultan's surviving enforcers locate Nagma and Asgar in a crowded marketplace, assassinating them both. Driven by vengeance, Definite tracks Sultan down to his hideout in Bhagalpur and executes him. Acknowledging that Definite has avenged their family's honor, Faizal instructs him to surrender to law enforcement to cement his legendary status as an untouchable underworld figure.

In 2005, Ramadhir infiltrates Faizal's inner circle by introducing a mole: Iqlakh, an educated, English-speaking youth harboring a personal vendetta against the family. Years prior, an intoxicated Iqlakh's father and his friends had abducted a local girl, prompting Sardar Khan to intervene and forcibly marry Iqlakh's father to her. Although Faizal is eventually made aware of Iqlakh's true identity and motives, he ignores the threat due to Iqlakh's exceptional financial value in rigging government scrap tenders. Iqlakh convinces Faizal to enter electoral politics to obtain formal institutional protection, leading Faizal to challenge Ramadhir by contesting elections from Ramadhir's own home constituency.

Recognizing that his political dynasty is on the verge of collapse, Ramadhir arranges Definite's release from prison, intending to use him as a secondary assassin should Iqlakh fail to assassinate Faizal on election day. However, J.P., resentful of his father's relentless humiliation and authoritarian control, secretly aligns with Faizal to orchestrate Ramadhir's downfall. On election day, Definite’s crew incites chaos at the polling booths to disrupt voting, while Iqlakh lures Faizal to a desolate location to assassinate him. Definite arrives, double-crosses and kills Iqlakh, and discloses the fractured parameters of Ramadhir's plot to Faizal.

Ignoring the desperate pleas of a heavily pregnant Mohsina, Faizal mounts a full-scale assault on a political meeting. Alongside Definite, Faizal storms the premises and systematically massacres Ramadhir Singh and Shamshad Alam. After an intense, protracted firefight with arriving police battalions, both Faizal and Definite surrender. While being transported to a maximum-security prison, the convoy officers stop at a roadside eatery, intentionally leaving Faizal isolated and handcuffed inside the van. Definite, who has been quietly released through a covert arrangement brokered with J.P., walks up to the vehicle and shoots Faizal dead. With all principal rivals eradicated, J.P. takes over the region's political apparatus, while Definite walks away a free man to reunite with his mother, Durga.

By 2009, Mohsina and Nasir, relocate to Mumbai to raise Faizal's young son, Feroz, away from the cycle of violence. Back in Dhanbad, Definite holds dominion over the fractured criminal syndicates of Wasseypur. Nasir grimly observes that despite the historic demises of both Ramadhir Singh and Faizal Khan, the fundamental, blood-soaked nature of Wasseypur remains an unrelenting, perpetual battlefield.

== Cast ==
- Nawazuddin Siddiqui as Faizal Khan
- Manoj Bajpayee as Sardar Khan (cameo appearance)
- Richa Chadha as Nagma Khatoon: Sardar's first widow; Danish, Faizal and Perpendicular's mother; Shama and Mohsina's mother-in-law; Feroz's grandmother.
- Huma Qureshi as Mohsina Hamid: Faizal's wife; Feroz's mother; Sardar and Nagma's daughter in law; Danish, Perpendicular, Shama's sister-in-law
- Reema Sen as Durga 'Bangalan' Khan: Sardar's second widow; Definite's mother; Danish, Faizal, Perpendicular's stepmother.
- Sanjay Singh as Fazlu, Faizal's friend
- Anurita Jha as Shama Parveen: Sultan's cousin; Danish's wife; Sardar and Nagma's daughter-in-law.
- Piyush Mishra as Nasir Ahmed
- Jameel Khan as Asgar Khan
- Vineet Kumar Singh as Danish Khan
- Pankaj Tripathi as Sultan Qureshi
- Satyakam Anand as J P Singh
- Murari Kumar as Guddu
- Gaurav Sharma as Iqlakh
- Faisal Malik as Inspector Gopal Singh
- Sankalp Acharekar as "Tangent"
- Rajkumar Rao as Shamshad Alam
- Mukesh Chhabra as Nawab, Shamshad's partner
- Zeishan Quadri as Definite Khan: Sardar and Durga's son; Danish, Faizal and Perpendicular's half-brother
- Aditya Kumar as Babu "Perpendicular" Khan
- Tigmanshu Dhulia as Ramadhir Singh
- Yashpal Sharma as Occasional Singer (special appearance)
- Ishtiyaq Anas as Munna Sultan gang member
- Pramod Pathak as Badoor Qureshi
- Vasan Bala as School teacher in Song Bahut Khoob

== Production ==
=== Development ===
Anurag Kashyap said he had wanted to make a film on Bihar with the name Bihar for some time, but for various reasons it didn't take off. In 2008 he met Zeishan Quadri (the writer of Gangs of Wasseypur) who told him about Wasseypur's story. He found it unreal to believe that mafia activity and gang war existed at such a high level, and what really attracted him was not gang war but the entire story of the emergence of the mafia. According to him, to tell the story through a few families is what interested him but that also meant a longer reel. "We all know mafia exists but what they do, how they operate, why they do we don't know and that is something which forms the basis of the film".

=== Casting ===
According to Bajpayee, the role of Sardar Khan is the most negative role he has done till date. His motivation for doing this role came from the fact that there was "something new" with the character of Sardar Khan. Piyush Mishra and Tigmanshu Dhulia were given the discretion to decide who, among them, would perform the roles of Nasir and Ramadhir. Mishra chose the role of Nasir and Dhulia portrayed Ramadhir Singh. Chadda revealed in an interview that this role helped her bag 11 film roles. This was Huma Qureshi's first film, and she characterised this as her "dream debut". Qureshi landed this role after director Anurag Kashyap spotted her in a Samsung commercial he was directing.

=== Filming ===
Major portions of the film were shot at villages near Bihar. Shooting also took place in Chunar. During filming in Varanasi in December 2010, film's chief assistant director Sohil Shah died while performing one of the stunt shot scenes. The movie was dedicated to Sohil Shah, as is seen in the opening titles. The film finished production in late March 2011.

The production cost was ₹18.4 crore. Anurag Kashyap has said that it is his most expensive film, and he reportedly had to spend ₹ 15 crore on paying the actors. However, he has tweeted that "45 crore as reported in the media is false."

== Soundtrack ==
The soundtrack album of the two-part compilation of Gangs of Wasseypur has a whopping 27 songs, which are composed by Sneha Khanwalkar and Piyush Mishra, with lyrics by Mishra and Varun Grover. However, the album was split up according to the film's release. The film score is composed by G. V. Prakash Kumar. Part-2 has 13 songs which were released on 11 July 2012.

== Marketing ==
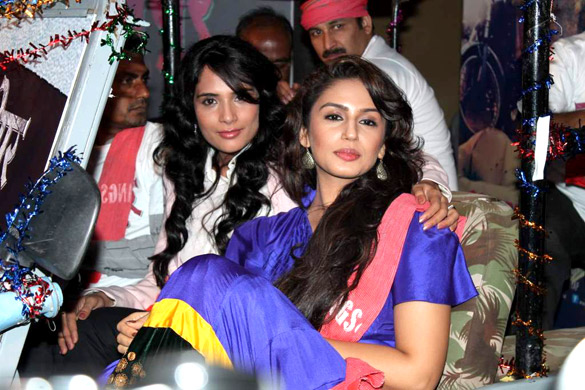
Actors from the film, Chadha and Qureshi (right) in 2012

The Gangs of Wasseypur franchise promoted a fake electoral campaign through the streets of Mumbai and Delhi to market the second instalment of the political thriller. In several areas of the two cities, political posters had been plastered, in which the two opposing contestants from the movie Ramadhir Singh and Faizal Khan, vied for votes.

The main cast of Gangs of Wasseypur 2 shot with the cast of Afsar Bitiya. Actors Nawazuddin Siddiqui (Faisal Khan) and Huma Qureshi (Mohsina) made a special appearance on the show. The show was aired on 7–8 August 2012.

As a part of the marketing campaign, the 'Wasseypur Patrika', a fictitious newspaper was made available online.

== Reception ==
=== Critical response ===
India

Gangs of Wasseypur 2 received mostly positive reviews.

Mayank Shekhar rated the movie 4/5 stars on Dainik Bhaskar and his review at theW14.com reads, "This is India's equivalent of; take your pick, Sergio Leone's Once Upon A Time in America (1984), or Robert Rodriguez's Once Upon A Time in Mexico (2003), though I suppose it could possibly be better than both. It's the definitive "litti western" to borrow the stock phrase "spaghetti western" for Leone's film. With 320 minutes broken into two parts, allows Kashyap the scope to seriously self-indulge and unabashedly entertaining. The reason you prefer this sequel to the first installment, besides it being more contemporary is, well, this is where the beginning ties up with the end. You get a full sense of the film's ambitions."

Taran Adarsh of Bollywood Hungama gave the movie 4/5 stars, saying that "On the whole, Gangs of Wasseypur – Part 2 is an Anurag Kashyap show all through and without an iota of doubt, can easily be listed as one amongst his paramount works. An engaging movie with several bravura moments. Watch it for its absolute cinematic brilliancy!"

Saibal Chatterjee of NDTV gave the movie 4/5 stars, stating that "The revenge, filmed with an operatic slo-mo rhythm, is bloodier than anything you would have seen before. But if you liked Gangs of Wasseypur, there is no reason why won't have another blast watching Gangs of Wasseypur – Part 2. But be warned: be sure that your stomach for blood and gore doesn't give way."

Blessy Chettiar of DNA India gave the movie 4/5 stars, commenting that "Guns speak where abusive language fails. Patience and a real kaleja will see you through this fast-paced, exhilarating blood fest. Kashyap makes sure the gore is beyond redemption. If you're turned off by it, not his fault."

Madhureeta Mukherjee of The Times of India gave the movie 4/5 stars, saying that "With excellent performances, a screenplay that's strung together beautifully (Zeishan Quadri, Akhilesh, Sachin Ladia, Anurag Kashyap) a revenge story that touches a dramatic crescendo and music that plays out perfectly in sync with tragic twists of the tale – ' GOW II' is an interesting watch, for the brave-hearted. Like the first part, the movie slows down at times (with pointless pistols, hordes of characters and wasted sub-plots); the length needs to be shot down desperately. But otherwise, it's revenge on a platter – served cold (heartedly) and definitely worth a 'second' helping."

Ananya Bhattacharya of Zee News gave the movie 4/5 stars, concluding that "While watching 'Wasseypur', the entire film takes your life away! Gangs of Wasseypur 2 is a film, which, with its predecessor, is one that is here to stay, to break conceptions, to demolish structures. With the history of Wasseypur, 'Wasseypur' has created another history."

Raja Sen of Rediff gave the movie 3.5/5 stars, stating that "Anurag Kashyap shines once again in the concluding part of Gangs of Wasseypur even though the film is a tad too long. For all its folly – and the fact that an hour could have been lopped off its running length, easy – Gangs of Wasseypur II provides enough cinematic memorabilia to single-handedly last us the summer."

International

International critics have given Gangs of Wasseypur, the first mainstream Bollywood film to be selected for the Director's Fortnight, rave reviews following its world premiere at the 65th Cannes Film Festival. Gangs of Wasseypur premiered at the 65th Cannes Film Festival on the evening of 22 May 2012 as the most highly anticipated Indian film. Deborah Young of The Hollywood Reporter called the film "an extraordinary ride through Bollywood's spectacular, over-the-top filmmaking".

Kashyap, whose reputation as a screenwriter and controversial director reach a culmination in this film, is the real behind-the-scenes godfather, never losing control over the story-telling or hundreds of actors, and allowing tongue-in-cheek diversions in the second half that confirm his command over the sprawling material. In the spirit of Bollywood, Rajiv Ravi's lensing is fast on its feet, with a continually moving camera that always seems to be in the right spot to capture the action. Referring to the violence and pace of the film she says "Gangs of Wasseypur puts Tarantino in a corner with its cool command of cinematically inspired and referenced violence, ironic characters and breathless pace".

Maggie Lee of Variety notes Kashyap never lets his diverse influences of old-school Italo-American mafia classics a la Coppola, Scorsese and Leone, as well as David Michod's taut crime thriller "Animal Kingdom," override the distinct Indian colour. Calling the film "the love child of Bollywood and Hollywood," she felt the film was "by turns pulverizing and poetic in its depiction of violence."

Lee Marshall of Screen International writes "the script alternates engagingly between scenes of sometimes stomach-churning violence and moments of domestic comedy, made more tasty by hard-boiled lines of dialogue like "in Wasseypur even the pigeons fly with one wing, because they need the other to cover their arse" ". He describes song lyrics "as if mouthed by a Greek chorus of street punks" commenting sarcastically on what's happening onscreen.

=== Box office ===
Gangs of Wasseypur 2 collected ₹15.44 crore in the first weekend and ₹17.80 crore by end of first week. Film ended with a total collection of ₹22.04 crore.

== Historical accuracy ==
The character of Faizal Khan is based on Fahim Khan. The latter was not killed but is currently in jail in Hazaribagh, sentenced to life imprisonment.

The character of Faizal Khan's friend Fazlu is based on Sabir Alam. In the film, Fazlu is killed and decapitated by Faizal. While Sabir and Fahim Khan were also childhood friends turned enemies, Sabir was sentenced to life imprisonment in 2007 for the murder of Fahim Khan's mother and aunt (who in the film where murdered by Sultan Qureshis' men), but was out on bail in Wasseypur as of 2013.

The mafia's downfall in Dhanbad didn't come from gang wars but rather it came from the differences between Kunti Singh, the widow of Surajdeo Singh, and his three brothers – Baccha Singh, Rajan Singh and Ram Dhani Singh – which gave others an opportunity to make space for themselves.
