= Music of Bihar =

Bihar, a state of India, has produced musicians like Bharat Ratna Ustad Bismillah Khan and dhrupad singers like the Malliks (Darbhanga Gharana) and the Mishras (Bettiah Gharana) along with poets like Pandit Dhareekshan Mishra, Bhikhari Thakur, the shakespeare of Bhojpuri and Vidyapati Thakur who contributed to Maithili Music. The classical music in Bihar is a form of the Hindustani classical music.

The region's folk songs are associated with the various events in the life of an ordinary person. The historical ballads dealing with the heroic deeds of the freedom fighter Kunwar Singh have also been immortalized through folk songs in the plain tracts of Bihar. Religiosity is the pivot around which the music and amusements of the village folk of Bihar revolve. There are songs like sohar - performed during childbirth, sumangali - associated with wedding, ropnigeet - performed during the season of sowing paddy, katnigeet - performed during the paddy harvesting season.

The influence of Bihari music is seen in regions such as Mauritius, South Africa and the Caribbean, where many Bihari indentured labourers were taken during the nineteenth century as well as Pakistan and Bangladesh where many Bihari Muslims migrated to after the partition of India.

There is a great tradition of folk songs started by Bhikhari Thakur, an artist from the Bhojpur region. In the field Bhojpuri Music and Songs, there are notable works done by Mahendar Misir, Radhamohan Chaubey 'Anjan', Pandit Dhareekshan Mishra, Laxman Pathak Pradeep, and Sharda Sinha. Other wandering folk singers include the Kathaks, who travelled in groups and performed accompanied by dholak, sarangi, tamburu and majira. Other musician classes included Roshan Chouki, Bhajaniya, Kirtaniya, Pamaria and Bhakliya.

'Harkirtan' are famous religious folk songs. 'Astajam' are also famous religious folk songs in which 'Hare-Rama, Hare-Krishna' is sung regularly for twenty four hours at Hindu religious places.

In Bihar there is Caste Bhatt (Brahma Bhatt) whose tradition is singing and music. Although with the passage of time they have left there profession. Some small groups also sings Sohar songs at the birth time. Some transgender people (Kinners) also sing for livelihood money.

== Famous singers and musicians from Bihar ==
=== Musician ===
- Bhikhari Thakur
- Ustad Bismillah Khan

=== Singers ===
- Sharda Sinha
- Daler Mehndi
- Kiran Ahluwalia
- Manoj Tiwari
- . Shashi Suman
- Deepali Kishore
- Aishwarya Nigam
- Parmanand Singh
- Maithili Thakur
- Ritviz

=== Music directors ===
- Chitragupta
- Anand–Milind
- Bapi Tutul
- Ramashreya Jha
- Norman Hackforth
