= Mayank Shekhar =

Indian film critic, journalist and author

Mayank Shekhar is an Indian film critic, journalist and author. He has been a film critic and a national cultural editor with Hindustan Times. He previously worked under Mumbai Mirror and MiD DAY. He also used to write a blog, Fad For Thought, at the Hindustan Times website. Currently, his reviews appear on his website theW14.com and also at the Dainik Bhaskar in different languages. He is the editorial head of Mid-Day entertainment and the host of the online talk show Sit with Hitlist. He is also an advisory member for the Central Board of Film Certification.

== Early life and education ==
Shekhar completed his schooling from Delhi Public School, R. K. Puram, Delhi in 1998 and thereafter graduated in Economics from St. Stephen's College, Delhi, in 2001 and moved to Mumbai thereafter. He currently resides at Chembur.

== Career ==
Shekhar moved to Mumbai after his studies and started his career as film journalist, eventually he came to head the features team at Mumbai Mirror for two years and was also part of the Mid-Day features team for four years.

In 2006, Bombay Talkies, a book authored by Shekhar was published by Frog Books. The book is a compilation of film reviews written by Shekhar from 2004 to 2005. In a review, Bollywood Hungama wrote that the book "qualifies more as his [Shekhar's] personal portfolio or his extended resume."

Shekhar is a member of the Central Board of Film Certification.

Shekhar has gained popularity for his film reviews. According to Rediff, Shekhar belongs to breed of film critics who "bring sense, and a measure of cinematic sensibility, to their writing". He has been the recipient of a number of awards. In 2004, he was one of 21 recipients of the 5th "Young Achievers Awards" by the Indo-American Film Society for his work as a film critic. In 2007 he was awarded with the Ramnath Goenka Award for Excellence in Journalism. In 2021, he won the Best Talk Show Host award for his online show Sit with Hitlist at the 5th Annual Talentrack Awards.

He currently runs a cinema website called theW14.com.

He has authored a book, Name Place Animal Thing. The Telegraph described it as "a collection of essays on a number of aspects of popular Indian culture - ranging from cinema and drinking to politics and music - that are often glossed over".

== Bibliography ==
- Bombay Talkies, Frog Books (IND), 2006.
- Name Place Animal Thing, 2016
