= Zeishan Quadri =

Indian actor and writer

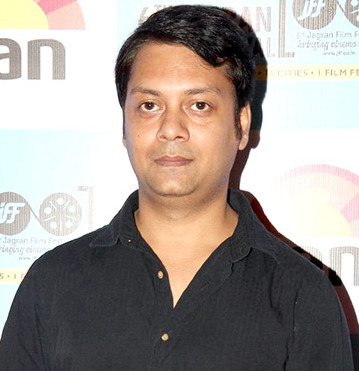
- Quadri at Jagran Film Festival (2015)
- Born: March 17, 1983 (age 43); Wasseypur, Bihar (now Jharkhand), India
- Occupations: Writer, Actor, Producer, Director
- Years active: 2009–present
- Known for: Gangs of Wasseypur; Meeruthiya Gangsters; Prague

Zeishan Quadri is an Indian writer, actor, director and producer who wrote the story and co-wrote the screenplay for the Bollywood crime genre film Gangs of Wasseypur, directed by Anurag Kashyap. Quadri has also acted in Gangs of Wasseypur - Part 2. He has directed and produced the film Meeruthiya Gangsters. In 2025, he participated in Bigg Boss 19.

== Early life ==
Zeishan Quadri was born in Wasseypur, Dhanbad, Bihar (now in Jharkhand) in 1983. He is the only son and the youngest child of Syed Imran Quadri, a civil engineer. Quadri grew up in a strict and protective environment. He has two elder sisters. Quadri was educated in Dhanbad. Quadri left Dhanbad to study for Bachelor of Arts (BA) from Meerut. Quadri worked in a call center and for HCL computers in Delhi for 18 months before coming to Mumbai in 2008.

== Film career ==
=== 2009-2012: Career beginnings and Gangs of Wasseypur ===
In 2009, Quadri moved to Mumbai to pursue a career in acting. Quadri studied world cinema including film makers such as Majid Majidi, Fateh Akın and Akira Kurosawa. In 2009, he met director Anurag Kashyap and pitched him the story of Wasseypur. Quadri negotiated to write the script and play the character "Definite" in the second part. On May 30, 2009, Quadri's story was sold to Kashyap. Based on real life events in the coal rich city of Dhanbad, it was a story about the "coal mafia" that spans several generations from 1941 to 2010. Gangs of Wasseypur, initially shot as a five hour long film, was released as a duology, with the first part releasing on June 22, 2012, and the second part releasing on August 8, 2012, in the Indian market, after being screened in its entirety at screened at the 2012 Cannes Directors' Fortnight. With an ensemble cast of Manoj Bajpayee, Nawazuddin Siddiqui, Pankaj Tripathi, Richa Chadda, Jaideep Ahlawat, Huma Qureshi, Piyush Mishra and Tigmanshu Dhulia starring in major roles, both films received widespread critical acclaim and were commercially successful at the box office. It has gained a large cult following over the years due to its dark humor, experimental soundtrack, and its raw and realistic filmmaking style not done by any Bollywood film before.

=== 2014: Further successes ===
He acted in the film Revolver Rani, which was directed by Sai Kabir and starred Kangana Ranaut and Vir Das. In 2014, Quadri acted in the movie Akki, Vikki Te Nikki directed by Vipin Sharma and produced by Bohra Brothers. He was reported to have been working on a script with Madhur Bhandarkar for his then-upcoming movie Madamji starring Priyanka Chopra, but since then, no further developments on the projects have been reported.

In 2015, he was reported to be working on a script Oh Womaniya for Pritish Nandy Communications to be helmed by director Anu Menon, and on the Fardeen Khan starrer Firauti, both of which were eventually shelved. His first film as a director and producer was Meeruthiya Gangsters. The editing of the film was executed by veteran filmmaker Anurag Kashyap who presented the film along with Prateek Entertainment Pvt. Ltd. Quadri visited many cities for the promotion of the film including Aligarh at Aligarh Muslim University. He also acted as the jury member at the university's eighth edition of Filmsaaz.

According to Mumbai Mirror, Anurag Kashyap and Quadri were reported to collaborate on the third installment of the Gangs of Wasseypur franchise, with Kashyap insisting that Quadri writes and directs the film. This claim was eventually debunked by Kashyap in 2024.

Quadri initially planned to produce Sarbjit, and roped in Omung Kumar as the director. The film released in 2016 to mixed reviews.

In 2020, Quadri starred in the non-fiction TV series Bicchoo Ka Khel, which was produced by Ekta Kapoor. He also produced and co-wrote the screenplay for the films Halahal and Chhalaang in the same year.

In 2024, he played a negative lead in the movie Woh Bhi Din The directed by Sajid Ali, produced by John Abraham Entertainment and a deputy CBI officer in Bloody Daddy. In 2025, he participated in the reality TV show Bigg Boss 19 and finished in the 15th place.

== Filmography ==
=== Films ===
Year	Film	Director	Producer	Screenwriter	Actor	Notes
2012	Gangs of Wasseypur			Yes		
2012	Gangs of Wasseypur - Part 2			Yes	Yes	
2013	Prague		Yes			
2014	Revolver Rani				Yes	
2015	Meeruthiya Gangster	Yes	Yes	Yes		
2018	Hotel Milan				Yes	
2019	Setters				Yes	
2019	Bhoot Purva	Yes				Web series released on ZEE5
2020	Halahal		Yes	Yes		
2020	Chhalaang			Yes		
2023	Bloody Daddy				Yes	
2024	Woh Bhi Din The				Yes	

=== Television ===
Year	Title	Role	References
2025	Bigg Boss 19	Contestant	15th Place

=== Web series ===
Year	Title	Role	Note
2020	Bicchoo Ka Khel	Inspector Nikunj Tiwari	Streaming on AltBalaji and ZEE5 on November 18
2021	Your Honor 2	Jagda	Sonyliv

=== Awards and nominations ===
Year	Film	Award	Category	Result	Notes
2013	Gangs Of Wasseypur	SAIFF	Best Supporting Actor	Won	
2013	Gangs Of Wasseypur	Star Screen Award	Best Dialogue Writer	Nominated	
2013	Gangs Of Wasseypur	Filmfare	Best Dialogue Writer	Won	
2013	Gangs Of Wasseypur	TOIFA	Best Dialogue Writer	Won	
2013	Gangs Of Wasseypur	IIFA	Best Dialogue Writer	Won	
