= Dragon (soundtrack) =

- Soundtrack album cover

Soundtrack album by Leon James
- Released: 9 February 2025
- Recorded: December 2024–February 2025
- Studio: Voice and Vision Studios, Chennai; Shambala Studios, Chennai; Sounds Right Studios, Chennai; 20db Sound Studios, Chennai; Jovi Records, Chennai; John Studio, Chennai
- Genre: Feature film soundtrack
- Length: 22:24
- Language: Tamil
- Label: Think Music
- Producer: Leon James

Leon James chronology
Laila (2025)	Dragon (2025)	Mazaka (2025)
External audio
- Audio Jukebox on YouTube

Singles from Dragon
- 1. "Rise of Dragon" Released: 2 January 2025; 2. "Vazhithunaiye" Released: 13 January 2025; 3. "Yendi Vittu Pona" Released: 28 January 2025

Dragon is the soundtrack album to the 2025 film of the same name directed by Ashwath Marimuthu and produced by AGS Entertainment, starring Pradeep Ranganathan in the titular role, alongside Anupama Parameswaran, Kayadu Lohar, George Maryan, K. S. Ravikumar, Gautham Vasudev Menon and Mysskin. The film's musical score and soundtrack are composed by Leon James, with lyrics written by Vignesh Shivan, Ko Sesha and Gana Apellow. Preceded by three singles, the soundtrack was released by Think Music on 9 February 2025.

== Development ==
The film's soundtrack and score were composed by Leon James in his first collaboration with Pradeep and third with Ashwath after Oh My Kadavule (2020) and Ori Devuda (2022). The album featured six songs with contributions from Anirudh Ravichander, Silambarasan, Yuvan Shankar Raja, along with Sid Sriram, Pradeep Kumar. Vignesh Shivan and Ko Sesha were credited as the lyricists. Leon James composed and recorded the songs during December 2024–February 2025.

== Release ==
The album preceded with the first single "Rise of Dragon" which released on 2 January 2025. The second single "Vazhithunaiye" was promoted as the "Dream Song" with a promo released on 8 January. The full song was later released on 13 January. The third single "Yendi Vittu Pona" was released on 28 January. Ashwath Marimuthu revealed that the song was dedicated to Leon's father Noell James, who died two days before the song's release. The soundtrack was released on 9 February 2025, along with its Telugu version which featured lyrics written by Ramajogayya Sastry.

== Reception ==
The album received positive reviews from critics and audience. Janani K. of India Today wrote "Music director Leon James's music and background music are a huge plus for a film like Dragon." Bharathy Singaravel of The News Minute wrote "Leon James’ songs are mostly memorable for the fame of their various singers. Silambarasan drones on in ‘Yein di Vittu Ponna’– a fittingly sexist track for the actor. Music director Anirudh has sung the hero's track ‘Rise of Dragon’ and Sid Sriram is credited with performing ‘Vazhithunaiye’. It's only Gana Apellow's ‘Maatikkinaaru Orutharu’ that blends easily with the events in the film." Harshini SV of The Times of India wrote "The songs and the way they are woven into the narrative is also a great plus to the film." Latha Srinivasan of Hindustan Times wrote "Music and songs by Leon James elevate the changing emotions and moods in the film. The young music director has done a good job in Dragon."

== Track listing ==
Dragon (Tamil)
No.	Title	Lyrics	Singer(s)	Length
1.	"Yendi Vittu Pona"	Ko Sesha	Silambarasan	04:18
2.	"Rise of Dragon"	Vignesh Shivan	Anirudh Ravichander, Nadisha Thomas, El Fé Choir	03:32
3.	"Vazhithunaiye"	Vignesh Shivan, Ko Sesha	Sid Sriram, Sanjana Kalamanje	03:39
4.	"Maatikkinaaru Orutharu"	Gana Apellow	Gana Apellow	03:22
5.	"Maname Maname"	Ko Sesha	Pradeep Kumar	04:13
6.	"Iraivaa"	Ko Sesha	Yuvan Shankar Raja	03:20
Total length:				22:24

All lyrics are written by Ramajogayya Sastry.

Return of the Dragon (Telugu)
No.	Title	Singer(s)	Length
1.	"Yendhukae Nannodhilaavu"	Deepak Blue	04:18
2.	"Rise of Dragon"	Leon James, Nadisha Thomas, El Fé Choir	03:32
3.	"Madhuvaramae"	Sarath Santosh, Srinisha Jayaseelan	03:39
4.	"Mantetthipoyae Weather'u"	Santhosh Hariharan	03:22
5.	"Manasa Manasa"	P V N S Rohit	04:13
6.	"Gathama Gathama"	Ravi G	03:20
Total length:			22:24

== Personnel ==
Credits adapted from Think Music India

- Music composer, producer, arranger and programmer – Leon James
- Lyricists – Vignesh Shivan, Ko Sesha, Gana Apellow
- Singers –Anirudh Ravichander, Nadisha Thomas Sid Sriram, Sanjana Kalmanje, Silambarasan, Gana Apellow, Pradeep Kumar, Yuvan Shankar Raja, Leon James
- Music supervisor – Ravi G
- Vocal producer – Ravi G, Lijesh Kumar
- Music manager – Roshan Doshi
- Creative consultant – David Joseph

Musicians

- Flute – Lalit Talluri (track: 1, 5)
- Ghatam – Sarvesh Karthick (track: 1)
- Violas – Himam, Chandru, Girijan, Gopinath, Sasi, Hemanth, Murali, Mohan, Samson, Anita, Sekar, Balaji (track: 1)
- Strings – Chennai Strings Orchestra (track: 1)
- String conductor – Yensone Bagyanathan (track: 1)
- Violas and strings recording – M. Sundar Raj (John Studio, Chennai) [track: 1]
- Choir – El Fé Choir (track: 2)
- Choir conductor – Roe Vincent (track: 2)
- Acoustic, electric and bass guitar – Keba Jeremiah (track: 3, 5, 6)
- Violin – Sayee Rakshith (track: 3)
- Mandolin – Vishwas Hari (track: 3)
- Mridangam – Sarvesh Karthick (track: 3)
- Nadaswaram – Mylai Karthikeyan (track: 6)
- Drums – David Joseph (track: 6)
- Keyboards – Leon James (track: 6)
- Chorus – Shenbagaraj, Narayan Ravishankar, Renjith Unni, Jithin Raj (track: 4)

Technical

- Recorded by – Ashwin George John (Sounds Right Studios, Chennai) [tracks: 1, 3, 4, 5], Lijesh Kumar (Voice and Vision Studios, Chennai) [track: 2], Avinash Satish (Jovi Records, Chennai) [track: 3], Hari SR (20db Sound Studios, Chennai) [tracks: 3, 5], KS Maniratnam (Krimson Avenue Studios, Chennai) [track: 5], Vishnu M Namboodiri (Mystics Room, Chennai) [track: 6]
- Engineered by – Sri Sai Ram (Shambala Studios, Chennai) [all tracks]
- Mixed and mastered by – Avinash Satish (Jovi Records, Chennai) [tracks: 1, 3, 4], Leon James (Shambala Studios, Chennai) [track: 2], Rupendar Venkatesh (Mix Magic Studios, Chennai) [tracks: 5, 6]
