= Love Insurance Kompany =

2026 Indian Tamil-language film

- Theatrical release poster
- Directed by: Vignesh Shivan
- Written by: Vignesh Shivan
- Produced by: Nayanthara; S. S. Lalit Kumar
- Starring: Pradeep Ranganathan; S. J. Suryah; Krithi Shetty
- Cinematography: Ravi Varman
- Edited by: Pradeep E. Ragav
- Music by: Anirudh Ravichander
- Production companies: Rowdy Pictures; Seven Screen Studio
- Distributed by: Red Giant Movies
- Release date: 10 April 2026
- Running time: 157 minutes
- Country: India
- Language: Tamil
- Budget: est. ₹90–95 crore
- Box office: est. ₹60−66 crore

Love Insurance Kompany (also known by the initialism LIK; /laɪk/) is a 2026 Indian Tamil-language science fiction romantic comedy film written and directed by Vignesh Shivan. Jointly produced by Rowdy Pictures and Seven Screen Studio, the film stars Pradeep Ranganathan, S. J. Suryah and Krithi Shetty, while Yogi Babu, Seeman, Gouri G. Kishan, Shah Ra, Malavika and Sunil Reddy appear in supporting roles. The story is set in a futuristic 2040 where people fall in love through a dating app named LIK. A man who believes in natural love falls for a woman who trusts the app, leading him to challenge the system.

The film was initially announced in 2019 without a title, with Sivakarthikeyan attached to star and Lyca Productions set to produce. However, it was shelved due to budget concerns. In 2023, the film was revived with Pradeep in the lead role, and Rowdy Pictures producing the film with Seven Screen Studio; the latter company officially announced the project that December with the title Love Insurance Corporation.

Principal photography commenced in January 2024 and concluded in April 2025. Filming took place in locations including Coimbatore, Udumalaipettai, Singapore and Malaysia. In July 2024, the film was retitled Love Insurance Kompany following separate copyright claims over the initialism LIC by S. S. Kumaran and the Life Insurance Corporation. It features music composed by Anirudh Ravichander, cinematography by Ravi Varman and editing by Pradeep E. Ragav.

After multiple delays, Love Insurance Kompany was released theatrically on 10 April 2026. The film received mixed reviews from critics and grossed over ₹60 crore (US$6.4 million) worldwide, making it a box-office bomb.

== Plot ==
In 2040, society depends on a dating app developed by Love Insurance Kompany (LIK), which uses advanced algorithms and data to match people and guarantee successful relationships without heartbreak. The app, also named LIK, is trusted by almost everyone, and Suriyan, the CEO of LIK, strongly believes that love can be calculated and controlled like a science. People rely on this technology instead of their own feelings when choosing partners. Vaibhav Vasudevan (Vibe Vaasey), however, does not believe in this idea. He feels that love should be natural, emotional and unpredictable, not decided by machines. His life changes when he meets Dheema, a woman who completely trusts LIK and believes it is the safest way to find love.

As the story progresses, Vaibhav and Dheema begin to spend more time together and slowly develop feelings for each other. However, their relationship becomes complicated because their beliefs about love are completely opposite. The LIK system predicts that they are not a perfect match, which creates doubt in Dheema's mind, as she has always trusted technology. Vaibhav, on the other hand, becomes frustrated that something as personal as love is being controlled by a system. This leads to a deeper conflict between them, as well as between Vaibhav and the LIK company itself. He begins to question whether human emotions can truly be measured or predicted by algorithms, while Suriyan continues to defend the system and its power. Their relationship becomes a symbol of the larger struggle between human emotions and artificial intelligence.

In the final part of the story, the conflict reaches its peak as Vaibhav openly challenges the LIK system and tries to prove that love cannot be reduced to numbers or predictions. Dheema is forced to make a difficult choice between trusting the system she has always believed in and following her own heart. As she reflects on her feelings, she begins to understand that real love involves risk and cannot be guaranteed or controlled. In the end, the LIK app is shut down by authorities due to privacy violations.

== Cast ==
- Pradeep Ranganathan as Vaibhav Vasudevan "Vibe Vaasey"
  - Pradeep also voices the LIK app
- S. J. Suryah as Suriyan
- Krithi Shetty as Dheema
- Seeman as Anbukadal
- Gouri G. Kishan as Kalki
- Yogi Babu as Jolly Prabhu
- Shah Ra as Jayanth
- Malavika as Vaala Meen
- Anandaraj as H. A. Subbu "Echcha Subbu"
- Sunil Reddy as Rajeev
- Edin Rose as Selena
- Nifya Razul as himself
- Kathukaruppu Kalai as himself
- Anirudh Ravichander as Bro 9000 (voice only)

Cameo appearances

- Riya Suman as Lakshmi
- Prashanth Rangaswamy as a child's parent in the song "Vibe Vaasey"
- VTV Ganesh as a LIK customer
- Bjorn Surrao as Parimal
- Amritha Aiyer as Vandana
- Mysskin as a doctor
- Rangaraj Pandey as a judge
- Deepika Venkatachalam as Tamizhselvi alias "Tamizhselfie"
- Namitha Marimuthu as a Judge
- Diwagar as himself in the song "Pookattum"
- VJ Abishek Raaja as Abishek
- Krish and Aish as themselves, a LIK customer couple
- Vignesh Shivan as himself during the audition for the LIK app's voice

== Production ==
=== Development ===
In late November 2018, actor Sivakarthikeyan, a long-time friend of director Vignesh Shivan, was reported to be collaborating with the latter on his next directorial venture, to be produced by Lyca Productions. On 21 March 2019, Lyca officially announced the project under the tentative title SK17, referring to Sivakarthikeyan's 17th film as a lead actor, and stated that filming would commence that July, with a theatrical release planned for 2020. However, that November, it was reported that Lyca had withdrawn from the project, believing that the proposed ₹70 crore (equivalent to ₹95 crore or US$10 million in 2026) budget was too high for a Sivakarthikeyan film and would be difficult to recover due to his then-nascent market value. A month later, reports suggested that Vignesh would produce the film under his own banner, Rowdy Pictures, following unsuccessful negotiations with other producers, and that he would instead direct Sivakarthikeyan in a different project. Vignesh later revealed that Lyca's concerns over the film's budget stemmed from its futuristic setting, and that he had refused their request to change the story to a present-day setting.

In March 2023, Pradeep Ranganathan was reportedly approached for the lead role in the revived project. Vignesh confirmed the project on his birthday, 18 September 2023; however, neither the production company nor the cast, apart from Pradeep, were revealed. That December, it was revealed that the film would be produced by S. S. Lalit Kumar under Seven Screen Studio. The company officially announced the project on 14 December under the title Love Insurance Corporation (LIC), and a muhurat puja ceremony was held on the same day. Vignesh and his wife Nayanthara co-produced the film with Lalit Kumar, marking their second collaboration after Kaathuvaakula Rendu Kaadhal (2022). Cinematographer Ravi Varman and editor Pradeep E. Ragav were signed on as part of the technical crew. On 25 July 2024, coinciding with Pradeep's birthday, the team announced the new title Love Insurance Kompany (LIK) owing to title disputes.

=== Casting ===
S. J. Suryah and Yogi Babu were confirmed to be part of the cast from their presence at the muhurat puja in December, while Krithi Shetty was announced as the lead actress. Besides acting, both Suryah and Pradeep were involved in a 12-hour writing workshop with Vignesh. Kiara Advani was the original choice for Shetty's role.

The film marks Seeman's return to acting after a hiatus due to his political commitments, as well as Malavika's return to Tamil cinema after a long hiatus. The name of her character, Vaala Meen, is a callback to the song "Vaala Meenukkum" from Chithiram Pesuthadi (2006), in which she appeared. She dubbed in her own voice for the first time in Tamil. Shetty, a non-Tamil speaker, learned the language from Seeman. Vignesh felt Seeman was perfect as his character, an environmental conservationist, since Seeman himself was one. He also encouraged Seeman to improvise his dialogues.

In February 2024, a promotional skit video released by influencer Nifya Razul revealed the inclusion of himself and Shah Ra. Edin Rose made her Tamil debut. Gouri G. Kishan said she was "underconfident" when Vignesh offered her a role in the film and that she was "pushed beyond [her] comfort zone". Anirudh Ravichander, besides composing the film's music, also voices a robot named Bro 9000.

=== Filming ===
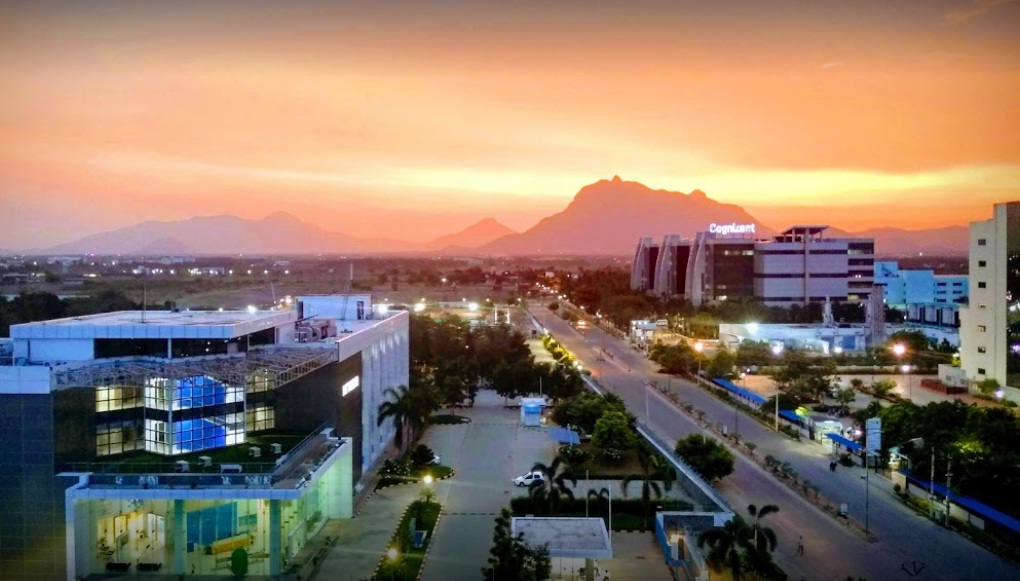
Coimbatore, where the first schedule took place

Principal photography began with the first schedule on 24 January 2024 at Isha Yoga in Coimbatore. Filming also took place at the Velliangiri Mountains for around a week. The team then moved to Thirumoorthy Dam in Udumalaipettai by 3 February to shoot significant portions. On 11 February, Suryah, through social media, stated that he had begun filming his portions.

The second schedule commenced on 22 March 2024 in Singapore. The team later moved to Malaysia to film minor portions. This schedule concluded by 26 March. By July 2024, the film entered its final phase of filming, with Pradeep also simultaneously shooting for the Ashwath Marimuthu directorial Dragon (2025).

In December 2024, rumours surfaced that Vignesh and Nayanthara had planned to acquire a government property in Puducherry after both of them met tourism minister K. Lakshminarayanan. Vignesh clarified that his visit was strictly to seek permission for filming a few sequences at the Pondicherry Airport and dismissed rumours about him wanting to purchase property.

On 11 April 2025, Vignesh announced on his Instagram handle that filming in Malaysia was nearing completion, with approximately two more days left. Principal photography wrapped on 14 April, while a song shoot took place a few months later, choreographed by Jani Master, whose participation was announced by Vignesh on 1 July.

== Music ==
Love Insurance Kompany

Soundtrack album by Anirudh Ravichander
- Released: 6 April 2026
- Recorded: January 2024–2026
- Studios: Albuquerque Studios, Chennai
- Genre: Feature film soundtrack
- Language: Tamil
- Label: Sony Music South
- Producer: Anirudh Ravichander

Anirudh Ravichander chronology
Madharaasi (2025)	Love Insurance Kompany (2026)	Jana Nayagan (2026)

Singles from Love Insurance Kompany
- 1. "Dheema" Released: 16 October 2024; 2. "Pattuma" Released: 27 November 2025; 3. "Adaavadi" Released: 30 March 2026

The soundtrack and background score are composed by Anirudh Ravichander, in his fourth collaboration with Vignesh after Naanum Rowdy Dhaan (2015), Thaanaa Serndha Koottam (2018) and Kaathuvaakula Rendu Kaadhal. The audio rights were acquired by Sony Music South. The first single, "Dheema", was released on 16 October 2024. The second single, "Pattuma" was released on 27 November 2025. The song "Enakena Yaarum Illaye", written by Vignesh for the unreleased film Aakko, was originally released on 14 February 2015, Valentine's Day; after its inclusion in Love Insurance Kompany, a music video was released on the same date in 2026. The third single "Adaavadi" was released on 30 March 2026. The remaining two songs, together with the full album, were released on 6 April 2026.

Track listing
No.	Title	Lyrics	Singer(s)	Length
1.	"Dheema"	Vignesh Shivan	Anirudh Ravichander	3:55
2.	"Pattuma"	Vignesh Shivan	Anirudh Ravichander, Anantha Krrishnan	3:29
3.	"Enakena Yaarum Illaye"	Vignesh Shivan	Anirudh Ravichander, Anantha Krrishnan	4:39
4.	"Adaavadi"	Rokesh, Heisenberg, Vignesh Shivan	Mathichiyam Bala	3:19
5.	"Pookatum"	Vignesh Shivan	Anirudh Ravichander, Bhumi	4:11
6.	"Vibe Vaasey"	Vignesh Shivan	Anirudh Ravichander	2:30
Total length:				22:03

In addition to the original soundtrack, the song "Mayilirage" composed by A. R. Rahman for the 2005 film Anbe Aaruyire also starring S. J. Suryah is featured in the film.

== Marketing ==
The film's title poster, along with the first and second look posters featuring Pradeep, was released on 25 July 2024. This was followed by Suryah and Shetty's character posters on 27 July and 2 August, respectively. The film's behind-the-scenes video was released on 18 September.

The first teaser was scheduled to release on 1 August 2025, but was delayed to 27 August due to the audio launch of Coolie taking place around the same time. After the release of the teaser, The Hollywood Reporter India stated that the inclusion of "Enakenna Yaarum Illaye" should "delight fans who have been wanting to see the hit track be part of a film sometime". Deepan Boopathy, the producer of Aakko, reacted positively to seeing the song "reach new audiences through this film".

The film's pre-release events were held at Park Hyatt Hyderabad on 5 April 2026, and at the Vel Tech Rangarajan Dr. Sagunthala R&D Institute of Science and Technology in Chennai two days later.

== Release ==
=== Theatrical ===
Love Insurance Kompany was released in theatres on 10 April 2026. The film was initially scheduled to release on 18 September 2025, but was postponed for undisclosed reasons. A new release date of 17 October, coinciding with Diwali, was later announced. However, it was postponed to 18 December to avoid clashing with Pradeep's other film, Dude. Ahead of the revised release date, journalists believed the film was likely to be further delayed, given the lack of promotional activity by the makers. Nevertheless, the apparent postponement and lack of confirmation by the makers received criticism from the trade, as it affected the possibility of several smaller Tamil films releasing during the time frame. Vignesh later revealed that the film was not released in December as planned because the makers could not find a suitable date.

By early February 2026, it was reported that the film's release was on hold because another big Tamil film, Jana Nayagan, was facing uncertainty over its release due to issues with the Central Board of Film Certification (CBFC), with the producers of other Tamil films, including Love Insurance Kompany, unwilling to clash with Jana Nayagan if it was cleared for release. On 18 March 2026, the film was given a new release date of 3 April 2026, coinciding with Good Friday. However, on 28 March 2026, the makers announced through a promo that the film had been postponed by a week. The promo, which features Pradeep, Anirudh and Vignesh discussing the film's release, self-deprecatingly acknowledges the film's various delays.

=== Distribution ===
Love Insurance Kompany was distributed by Red Giant Movies in Tamil Nadu. Shree Padmini Cinemas acquired the film's theatrical rights in the Telugu states (Andhra Pradesh and Telangana). The Kerala theatrical rights were acquired by Sree Gokulam Movies and it was released through Dream Big Films. Phars Film acquired the overseas theatrical rights. Prathyangira Cinemas initially acquired the film's United States theatrical rights, but later opted out of the deal, citing "unforeseen circumstances".

=== Home media ===
The film began streaming on Amazon Prime Video from 6 May 2026. It had its television premiere on 19 July 2026.

== Reception ==
=== Critical response ===
Love Insurance Kompany received mixed reviews from critics.

Yashaswini Sri of The Indian Express gave the film 3.5 out of 5 stars and called it "Tamil cinema's most original romantic comedy in years. It is warm, often funny, and anchored by three performers at the top of their game". Janani K of India Today gave the film 3 out of 5 stars and called it "a flawed yet genuinely entertaining romantic comedy that reflects a society increasingly shaped by technology. While it emphasises the importance of human communication, it stops short of advocating for a balanced approach". Latha Srinivasan of NDTV gave the film 2.5 out of 5 stars and wrote, "LIK's production values are superb, and no expense has been spared to ensure the movie is a vibrant and colourful watch on the big screen. The cinematography by Ravi Varman is top-notch, and Anirudh Ravichander's songs have already become chart-busters pre-release". Kirubhakar Purushothaman of The Federal wrote that Love Insurance Kompany "is, at its core, a well-packaged entertainer... bright, funny, and propelled by committed performances", but added that "for a film that takes on the audacious task of defending love against the cold logic of algorithms, it is undone by its own romanticism".

Akshay Kumar of Cinema Express gave the film 2 out of 5 stars and wrote, "The film reeks of artificiality and half-heartedness when the narrative decides to show something beyond the application." Bhuvanesh Chandar of The Hindu wrote that "a film 'made entirely by humans' is still worth watching, for there's imperfection, craftsmanship, a genuine search for truth, and a beating heart. No robot can replace that". Vishal Menon of The Hollywood Reporter India compared the film to the Netflix series Black Mirror and, despite praising the cinematography and music, concluded, "For all its ambition, LIK is a futuristic movie with medieval problems". Sreeju Sudhakaran of Rediff.com wrote that LIK "is an ambitious film for its setting, but underscores in both the romance and the humour departments". He added that "the world-building is vibrant, the ideas are relevant, but the storytelling lacks the depth and conviction needed to bring them together meaningfully". Bryan Durham of Variety India noted the film's similarities to the television series The Consultant, Black Mirror and the film CTRL, but wrote, "Ranting about how invasive always-connectedness can get without getting preachy and being entertaining while doing that, is an art and LIK nails it effortlessly".

=== Box office ===
According to an estimate by Variety India, Love Insurance Kompany earned ₹9.93 crore (US$1.1 million) worldwide on its opening day; ₹7.93 crore (US$850,000) from India and ₹2 crore (US$210,000) overseas. As of 16 April, the film had grossed ₹36.52 crore (US$3.9 million) in India, which increased to ₹54.37 crore (US$5.8 million) worldwide by 20 April. Journalists however expressed scepticism over the possibility of Love Insurance Kompany grossing over ₹100 crore (US$11 million), unlike Pradeep's previous three films Love Today (2022), Dragon and Dude, due to the impending release of Kara and other films in the same month. Eventually, by May, near the end of its theatrical run, the film grossed ₹60.23 crore (US$6.4 million)–₹66.47 crore (US$7.1 million) worldwide. Trade analysts considered it Pradeep's first box-office bomb, ending a success streak that started with Love Today, with attention towards the 2026 Tamil Nadu Legislative Assembly election considered a contributing factor in the declining footfalls. Vignesh expressed his dismay over the film not reaching the ₹100 crore benchmark, but said he was nonetheless content because the film managed to release. He later noted that the film received better response after its streaming debut, and blamed negative reviews for discouraging large audiences from watching the film in theatres. This comment received backlash from netizens who asked him to take "accountability" for the film's flaws.

== Controversies ==
Shortly after the reveal of the initial title Love Insurance Corporation and its initialism, S. S. Kumaran issued a warning against Vignesh, stating that he had registered the LIC initialism in 2015 for a potential film (Life is Colourful). He further stated that an associate of Vignesh had approached him seeking the title but was rebuffed, yet still used it. Soon after in January 2024, the Life Insurance Corporation (LIC), which holds the trademark rights to the initialism, sent a cease and desist notice to the team, accusing them of trademark infringement and ordered them to change the title at the earliest. This prompted the team to announce the new title and initialism in July 2024. Post-release, Vignesh said LIC demanded ₹112 crore (equivalent to ₹119 crore or US$13 million in 2026) if LIC were to continue as the film's title, a sum he did not consider feasible. Having anticipated such legal action, Vignesh said he had LIK along with three other initialisms – LIF, LIP and LIT – as contingency plans.

After Vignesh announced Jani Master's participation, he and Nayanthara received backlash since Jani was an accused sex offender convicted and released on conditional bail. Nayanthara in particular received criticism for allegedly enabling Jani since she was viewed as a "self-made woman", and had previously spoken against sexual abuse. She has not openly addressed or responded to the issue. As of 2026, the charges against Jani have not been closed.
