= Dharman =

Upcoming Indian film by Ashwath Marimuthu

- Film poster
- Directed by: Ashwath Marimuthu
- Written by: Ashwath Marimuthu
- Produced by: Kamal Haasan; R. Mahendran
- Starring: Rajinikanth; Ram Pothineni; Simran; Nayanthara; Raashii Khanna; Sreeleela
- Cinematography: Niketh Bommi
- Edited by: Pradeep E. Ragav
- Music by: Anirudh Ravichander
- Production companies: Raaj Kamal Films International; Turmeric Media
- Distributed by: Red Giant Movies
- Country: India
- Language: Tamil

Dharman (transl. Righteous man; also marketed as Dharman: The Deadly Doctor) is an upcoming Indian Tamil-language action thriller film written and directed by Ashwath Marimuthu. Produced by Kamal Haasan's Raaj Kamal Films International together with Turmeric Media, it stars Rajinikanth, while Ram Pothineni, Simran, Nayanthara, Raashii Khanna, Sreeleela and Yogi Babu play pivotal roles.

The film, tentatively titled Thalaivar 173, was announced in September 2025. Sundar C was announced as the director two months later but soon opted out. In January 2026, Cibi Chakravathi was named as Sundar's replacement. However, that June, Ashwath was announced as the director alongside the film's official title, and filming began shortly thereafter. The film has music composed by Anirudh Ravichander, cinematography handled by Niketh Bommi and editing by Pradeep E. Ragav.

== Cast ==
- Rajinikanth
- Ram Pothineni
- Simran
- Nayanthara
- Raashii Khanna
- Sreeleela
- Yogi Babu

== Production ==
=== Development ===
After the success of Coolie in mid-2025, it was reported that Rajinikanth and Kamal Haasan would collaborate as lead actors after 46 years, since Allauddinum Albhutha Vilakkum (1979) under the direction of Lokesh Kanagaraj. That September, at an award night, Haasan confirmed a potential collaboration with Rajinikanth. A few days later, Rajinikanth announced that he had signed his 173rd film with Haasan's company, Raaj Kamal Films International, which would be distributed by Red Giant Movies. However, he also stated that the director for the project had yet to be finalised.

The following month, it was reported that due to the subpar critical response to Coolie, Rajinikanth and Haasan had discussions with other directors besides Lokesh, with Nelson Dilipkumar emerging a front-runner. Lokesh later clarified that he spent over a month writing a script for Rajinikanth and Haasan; they wanted him to direct them in a "light hearted" film as a break from the consecutive action films they had been acting in, but Lokesh refused, feeling he did not specialise in such films. After some reports claimed that Pradeep Ranganathan would direct the project, he denied this during an interview with Anupama Chopra.

=== Pre-production ===
Prior to the project's official commencement, Rajinikanth was reported to reunite with Sundar C after Arunachalam (1997) for a separate film. Reports claimed that production was set to begin immediately after the actor completed Jailer 2 (2026). However, on 5 November, Sundar was announced as the director of this project, also reuniting with Haasan after Anbe Sivam (2003). It was also confirmed that Haasan's role was limited to producing, rather than acting as previously rumoured. On 13 November, just over a week after the announcement, Sundar announced his exit from the project, citing "unforeseen and unavoidable circumstances". Ashwath Marimuthu was later approached and developed a script that impressed Rajnikanth. Discussions regarding casting had begun, but Ashwath was ultimately unable to continue for undisclosed reasons.

Cibi Chakravarthy, who previously directed Don (2022), was announced as the new director on 3 January 2026. Later that month, Rajinikanth revealed that principal photography would begin in April. However, in April, reports emerged that Cibi had also left the film and that Ashwath was being considered as his replacement. At the end of the month, this report was contradicted by other reports claiming Cibi remained attached to direct and was revising the script at Rajinikanth's request. Sundar later revealed that he had left the project due to feeling pressured and preferred to make films according to his own creative vision.

On 24 June 2026, the film's title was announced as Dharman, and Ashwath was confirmed to be the new director and writer; Turmeric Media were also revealed to be producing the film. Speaking at the title announcement event, Rajinikanth revealed that K. S. Ravikumar had discussions to direct before Sundar, and the latter left due to "prior commitments". He said he appreciated Cibi's script, based on nuclear weaponry, but it was shelved as it needed "a different level of planning and budget" due to its large scale. Rajinikanth expressed admiration for Ashwath's Dragon (2025), which played a key role in approaching him, and said although Haasan was initially unwilling to listen to Ashwath's script, leaving Rajinikanth to take a decision, Rajinikanth urged him to listen, and Haasan finalised Ashwath as director after both men were impressed with his script.

=== Casting ===
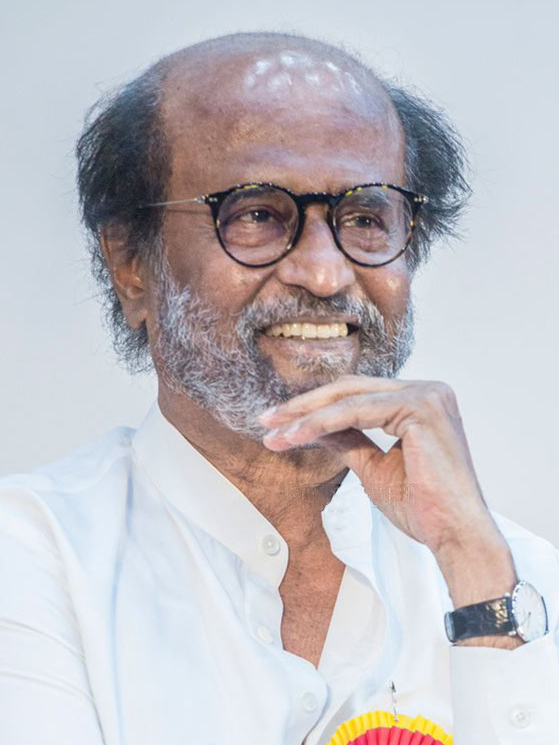
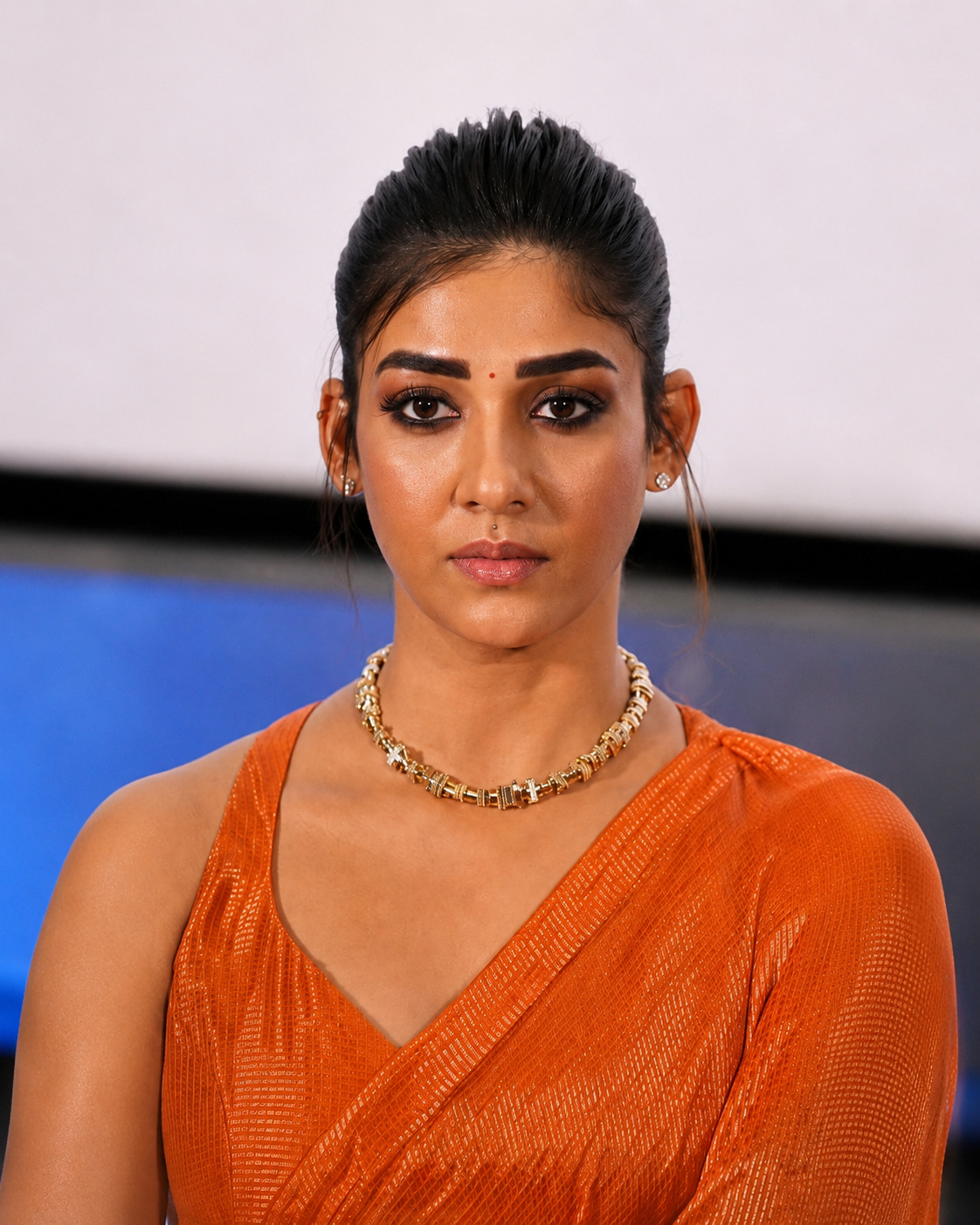
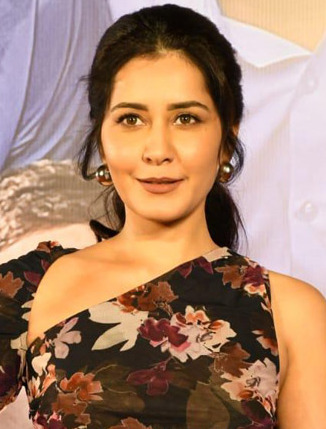
The film's primary cast — Rajinikanth, Ram Pothineni, Simran, Nayanthara, Raashii Khanna and Sreeleela.

Rajinikanth will be playing a doctor in the film, marking the first time in his career. Kamal Haasan was suggested by early reports to star alongside Rajinikanth, reuniting with him on screen after 46 years. However, when Sundar was announced as director in November 2025, it was confirmed that Haasan would participate solely as producer. On 24 June 2026, Simran and Raashii Khanna were announced as the film's lead actresses. The film is Simran's second collaboration with Rajinikanth after Petta (2019). Yogi Babu also joined the cast of the film, in his fourth collaboration with Rajinikanth after Darbar (2020), Jailer (2023) and Jailer 2. Discussions regarding additional casting had previously taken place during Ashwath's initial involvement with the project.

Ram Pothineni, Rukmini Vasanth, and Mysskin were reported to play important roles. On 29 September, Khanna posted a picture with Pothineni and Rajinikanth on Instagram, but later deleted the picture. Sreeleela too was confirmed to be part of the cast through a leaked video. On 25 October 2026, Nayanthara was confirmed to be part of the cast, marking her sixth appearance in a Rajinikanth film after Chandramukhi (2005), Sivaji: The Boss (2007), Kuselan (2008), Darbar and Annaatthe (2021). The producers formally confirmed Sreeleela's casting in early November, and Pothineni's on 8 November. It marks his Tamil cinema debut. (Note: Ram Pothineni made his first debut in Tamil cinema was The Warriorr (2022), but it a bilingual film, in his straight Tamil cinema debut is Dharman.) Reports suggested that Pothineni would play the antagonist.

=== Filming ===
Principal photography began on 25 June 2026 in Chennai with a song sequence. Two days later, filming was halted due the death of actor and filmmaker K. Bhagyaraj as Rajinikanth chose to pay his last respects to Bhagyaraj. Despite this, the first filming schedule had ended by early July. The second schedule began on 13 August. During this schedule, several key portions, including an action sequence featuring Rajinikanth, were shot, and the schedule was completed by 4 September. The third schedule began in mid-September, and concluded by the end of the month. The fourth schedule began shortly thereafter in Mysore. Ashwath anticipated that overall filming would be completed in October, though it did not happen.

== Music ==
The soundtrack is composed by Anirudh Ravichander, in his first collaboration with Ashwath and seventh with Rajinikanth. The audio rights were acquired by Saregama. During the film's launch, Ashwath stated the soundtrack would feature eight songs.

== Release ==
The film was scheduled to be released in January 2027, on the occasion of Pongal, by Red Giant Movies, when Sundar was the director. After his replacement with Cibi, the release window remained unchanged.
