= Dude (2025 film) =

2025 Indian film by Keerthiswaran

- Theatrical release poster
- Directed by: Keerthiswaran
- Written by: Keerthiswaran
- Produced by: Naveen Yerneni; Y. Ravi Shankar
- Starring: Pradeep Ranganathan; Mamitha Baiju; R. Sarathkumar; Hridhu Haroon; Rohini
- Cinematography: Niketh Bommi
- Edited by: Barath Vikraman
- Music by: Sai Abhyankkar
- Production company: Mythri Movie Makers
- Distributed by: see below
- Release date: 17 October 2025
- Running time: 139 minutes
- Country: India
- Language: Tamil
- Budget: ₹25–30 crore
- Box office: ₹100–113.25 crore

Dude is a 2025 Indian Tamil-language romantic comedy film written and directed by Keerthiswaran. Produced by Mythri Movie Makers, the film stars Pradeep Ranganathan, Mamitha Baiju and R. Sarathkumar in the lead, alongside Hridhu Haroon, Rohini, Aishwarya Sharma. Neha Shetty appears in an extended cameo.

The film, Keerthiswaran's directorial debut and Mythri's second Tamil production, was confirmed by its streaming platform Netflix in January 2025, while Mythri officially announced the project the following March under the tentative title PR 04, as it is Pradeep's fourth film as a lead actor. Principal photography commenced the same month in Chennai. The official title was revealed in May. The film has music composed by Sai Abhyankkar, cinematography handled by Niketh Bommi and editing by Barath Vikraman.

Dude was released in theaters worldwide on 17 October 2025, during the Diwali weekend. The film received mixed reviews from critics and became a commercial success.

== Plot ==
Agan and Kuralarasi alias Kural are close cousins who run Surprise Dude, an event-planning collective organising surprise events for weddings, anniversaries, and proposals. Their playful friendship changes when Kural confesses her love for Agan. Startled, he rudely rejects her, insisting he sees her only as a friend and family member and will never develop romantic feelings for her. Hurt, Kural leaves for Bangalore to pursue higher studies. After a few days, Agan has an accident, realises he loves her, and decides to confess his feelings.

Seeking approval, Agan approaches Kural's father, Athiyamaan, a powerful minister, who immediately accepts and begins arranging the wedding without Kural's consent. When Kural returns from Bangalore, Agan eagerly visits her on the eve of the ceremony. However, when he forcefully tries to kiss her, she stops him and reveals that she is distressed and contemplating suicide by hanging. She confesses that she fell in love in Bangalore with Paari, her dim-witted classmate. Realising she no longer loves him, Agan conceals his feelings, passes the kiss off as a joke, and promises to reunite her with Paari. Kural later tells Athiyamaan that Paari belongs to another caste. He fiercely opposes the relationship and reveals that, to protect his political reputation, he previously killed his younger sister who was also named as Kuralarasi as she had a relationship with a man from a different caste, concealing the crime for 32 years.

At the wedding reception, Paari and Kural attempt to elope with Agan's help, but abandon the plan after seeing Athiyamaan's extensive political influence. Unable to flee abroad because Paari lacks an passport, they fake the wedding, resulting in Kural marrying Agan. He subsequently helps the couple escape to Thailand, but immigration requirements thwart their plans. They instead arrange to flee to Canada with help from Agan's ex-girlfriend and her husband. Paari's visa is approved, but Kural's is rejected after her medical report reveals she is pregnant with Paari's child.

Agan suggests abortion, but a gynaecologist warns that Kural's weak uterus could make the procedure dangerous and cause future miscarriages. Although Agan withdraws his suggestion, Kural insists on proceeding. He threatens to reveal the situation to Athiyamaan, forcing her to abandon the idea. She gives birth to a six-fingered baby boy, and Agan poses as the child's father to complete official paperwork and care for him.

Before Kural's rescheduled departure, Agan's friend reveals that he had always loved her but stepped aside after learning of her love for Paari. Deeply moved, Kural confronts Agan and promises to find him a wife. She files for divorce and searches for matches through matrimonial websites and dating apps, but unsuccessfully. To fulfil his promise to send her abroad, Agan asks his colleague Samyuktha to pretend to be his girlfriend, allowing the travel arrangements to proceed.

Athiyamaan discovers the divorce and summons Kural. Agan takes responsibility, claiming he intends to remarry. Furious at the public humiliation, Athiyamaan assaults him and orders his men to kill him. Kural then confesses everything to her father, who takes her baby son to kill him. Agan pursues them, and Athiyamaan suffers a heart attack just as he is about to commit the murder.

Athiyamaan awakens in hospital and is told that his grandson crawled to the road and attracted a passer-by who rescued them. Agan urges him to value love over reputation and caste. Athiyamaan repents, apologises to his sister—Agan's mother—publicly confesses to the murder after 32 years, and is imprisoned. It is then revealed that Agan actually saved him and falsely credited the baby in order to change Athiyamaan's heart and gain his acceptance of Paari.

In the post-credits sequence, Agan's mother reveals that he and Samyuktha have genuinely fallen in love and that their marriage has been arranged. The film ends with Agan finding closure through love and Athiyamaan achieving redemption through truth.

== Cast ==
- Pradeep Ranganathan as Agan Chidambaram
  - Mithran Karththi as young Agan
- Mamitha Baiju as Kuralarasi Jr. "Kural" Athiyamaan
  - Shynika Raj as young Kural
- R. Sarathkumar as Dairy Development Minister Athiyamaan Azhagappan, Kural’s father
- Hridhu Haroon as Paari, Kural's dim-witted partner
- Rohini as Parvathy, Agan’s mother and Athiyamaan's sister
- Aishwarya Sharma as Samyuktha, Agan's love interest
- Vinodhini Vaidyanathan as S. Nandhini, a gynaecologist
- Dravid Selvam as Lux, Agan’s best friend
- Avudaiyappan as a news reporter
- Baby Anaisha Malik as Madasaamy, Kural's and Paari's son
- Agathiyan Arappukottai as Sivanesan
- M. J. Shriram as a doctor
- Chella as Police Inspector
- Manusri Karthikeyan as Kuralarasi Azhagappan Sr., Kural's late aunt and Athiyamaan's sister
- Raghuvaran as Chidambaram, Agan’s father (posthumous photographic appearance)
- Neha Shetty as Amudha, Agan’s ex–girlfriend (extended cameo)
- Satya as Rahul, Amudha’s supportive and loving husband (cameo appearance; voiceover by Shah Ra)
- Besant Ravi as Agan's customer (cameo appearance)
- Ramachandra Raju as Gajanna, Athiyamaan's friend and Karnataka Minister of Electricity (cameo appearance)
- Danya Pallath
- "Araathi" Archana Kumaar as a nurse

== Production ==
=== Development ===
In early 2024, Keerthiswaran, a former assistant director of Sudha Kongara, approached producers Y. Ravi Shankar and Naveen Yerneni of Mythri Movie Makers with the script for his directorial debut. Impressed by the narrative, the producers agreed to back the project. Following the confirmation of Mythri Movie Makers as the production house, Keerthiswaran offered the lead role to Pradeep Ranganathan. Although Pradeep initially declined the offer, citing concerns that certain portions of the script might affect his public image, in a comedic way, he later agreed to sign on to the project after being personally approached by the producers. The project would mark Mythri's second Tamil production after the Ajith Kumar-starrer Good Bad Ugly (2025).

Netflix confirmed the project in January 2025 during "Netflix Pandigai", where they reveal the list of Tamil films which would be released on the streaming platform after the theatrical release, with this project being a part of the list. Mythri Movie Makers made a public announcement on 26 March 2025, confirming the project once again, tentatively titled PR 04. The technical team consists of music composer Sai Abhyankkar, cinematographer Niketh Bommi, editor Barath Vikraman, and costume designer Poornima Ramasamy. Latha Naidu was the production designer of the film. The official title Dude was announced on 10 May 2025.

=== Casting and filming ===
Malayalam actress Mamitha Baiju was cast as the lead actress after the director was impressed with her performance in Super Sharanya. Principal photography began with an inaugural puja ceremony held on 26 March 2025 with the presence of the film's cast and crew at a film city in Chennai. Filming wrapped by late-June.

== Music ==
The soundtrack is composed by Sai Abhyankkar.

The audio rights were acquired by Think Music. "Blud Is On His Way" was the track that was used for the announcement video of the film, which was released on 26 March 2025. The first single "Oorum Blood" was released on 28 August 2025. An unplugged version of the song was released a week later, on 2 September. The second single "Nallaru Po" was released on 19 September. The third single "Singari", Pradeep's debut as a playback singer, was released on 4 October. The fourth single "Kannukulla" was released on 15 October 2025. The audio jukebox was released on 27 October 2025.

Sai Abyankar shocked millions on his debut movie by reusing the track "Oorum Blood" several times throughout the movie in multiple variations, a first for the industry, so much so that he had to release it all in a separate tracklist called "Dude Side B".

This phenomenon has now come to be known as the "iSai effect" which is when a Sai Abyankar song would get mixed or critical responses during its initial release, but weeks or days later people would begin to uncover the true intent the great iSai held during composition, this would then make the masses love the song. This effect was also seen in Karrupu, and subsequent Sai Abyankar singles. But Dude (2026)'s soundtrack is the first recorded instance of the effect.

== Release ==
=== Theatrical ===
Dude was released theatrically on 17 October 2025, during Diwali, and clashing with Bison Kaalamaadan and Diesel.

=== Distribution ===
Romeo Pictures initially acquired the rights for Tamil Nadu, but stepped out of the project due to unknown reasons. AGS Entertainment later acquired the theatrical rights, marking their third collaboration with Pradeep after Love Today (2022) and Dragon (2025). The overseas distribution rights were bought by Prathyangira Cinemas. Malik Streams Corporation distributed the film in Malaysia. York Cinemas handled the film's distribution in Canada.

=== Home media ===
The post-theatrical streaming rights were reportedly acquired by Netflix for ₹25 crore (US$2.6 million) and satellite rights were purchased by Zee Tamil and Zee Thirai. The film began streaming on Netflix from 14 November 2025.

== Reception ==
=== Critical response ===
Dude received mixed reviews from critics.

Roopa Radhakrishnan of The Times of India gave 3/5 stars and wrote "Dude is a confident debut film. Even though it may not get a lot of things right, the film makes you curious about what its director is going to make next." Janani K of India Today gave 3/5 stars and wrote "'Dude' is a fun-filled film that works best when it embraces its absurdity rather than preach. It delivers exactly what it promises – a fun, eccentric romance with moments of genuine hilarity. " Neeshita Nyayapati of Hindustan Times gave 3/5 stars and wrote "If you liked Pradeep’s previous films Love Today (2022) and Dragon (2025), or Mamitha’s Premalu (2024), it’s more than likely that you will like Dude. [...] It doesn’t hurt that their chemistry crackles when they’re together on-screen. Dude might not top any of the previously mentioned work of these actors when it comes to the writing, but it’s definitely a good addition to their filmography."

Arjun Menon of The Indian Express gave 2.5/5 stars and wrote "Pradeep Ranganathan and Mamitha Baiju-starrer Dude is ultimately a one-time watch, a film that starts off with breezy fun but loses its charm in a meandering, uneven second half." Prashanth Vallavan of Cinema Express gave 2.5/5 stars and wrote "Dude has a wacky infectious energy, and uses it to make hard-hitting commentary on social themes, but fails to leave a lasting impact." Anusha Sundar of OTT Play gave 2.5/5 stars and wrote "Pradeep Ranganathan and Mamitha Baiju's film, which undeniably falls under both romantic entertainer and social drama categories, gets saved by some smart performances and onscreen execution. [...] With some evident flaws and noble intentions, Dude strives to be an entertainer which it achieves to an extent."

Srinivasa Ramanujam of The Hindu worte "While Pradeep scores not only in the humour part but also in the emotional sequences, Mamitha displays a range of expressions, especially when she is caught in a tug-of-war like situation during a wedding. [...] Where Dude misses out unlike Pradeep’s previous hit, Dragon, directed by Ashwath Marimuthu, or even Love Today, is its writing of the characters other than the protagonists."

Vishal Menon of The Hollywood Reporter India worte "Pradeep Ranganathan’s Dude wants to be a self-aware satire about love, ego and liberation, but its loud tone, chaotic twists and overcooked emotions leave you more exhausted than entertained." Rajasekar S of The Federal worte "Overall, Dude is a spirited romantic drama that delivers ample laughs, heartfelt moments, and though-provoking commentary on caste and gender dynamics. Keerthiswaran’s directorial debut shows promise, blending humour and heart with a socially conscious lens, even if the execution falters in parts. For fans of Pradeep’s brand of quirky charm and those seeking a light-hearted yet meaningful cinematic experience, Dude is well worth a watch."

=== Box office ===
In India, Dude was released alongside Bison and Diesel. It opened to ₹11 crore (US$1.1 million) domestically, with ₹4 crore (US$420,000) from Telugu states, becoming the highest opening among the releases. Worldwide, the film collected ₹22 crore (US$2.3 million), emerging as the highest opening for Pradeep.

In Malaysia, the film opened in second place on the Malaysian box office chart behind Tron: Ares. In the following week (23 October 2025 – 26 October 2025) it climbed to No.1, overtaking Tron thanks to Deepavali holiday.

It concluded its run with a worldwide gross estimated to be ₹100–113.25 crore.

== Controversies ==
Musician Ilaiyaraaja sued Mythri Movie Makers for using his compositions "Karutha Machan" from Pudhu Nellu Pudhu Naathu (1991) and "Nooru Varusham" from Panakkaran (1990) without his permission. Mythri Movie Makers paid him ₹50 lakh (equivalent to ₹52 lakh or US$54,000 in 2026) as compensation.

Director Keerthiswaran faced backlash on social media after replying to a fan on Instagram who questioned the film's vulgar dialogue. Some netizens criticized the director's response as rude, sparking debates online about his interaction with viewers. While certain messages were ignored by the director, playful or joking replies were also noted in other instances. The controversy gained attention during both the theatrical release and the film's OTT streaming period, contributing to discussions about the film's content and the filmmaker's conduct.
