= SIIMA Award for Best Director – Tamil =

- Awarded for: Best Direction Achievement in Tamil cinema
- Country: India
- Presented by: Vibri Media Group
- First award: 21 June 2012 (for films released in 2011)
- Most recent winner: Ashwath Marimuthu, Dragon (2025)

Highlights
- Most wins: Atlee, Lokesh Kanagaraj and Vetrimaaran (2)
- Most nominations: Vetrimaaran (6)

SIIMA Award for Best Director – Tamil is presented by the Vibri Media Group as part of its annual South Indian International Movie Awards, for best film direction done by a director in Tamil films. The award was first given in 2012 for films released in 2011.

== Superlatives ==
Categories	Recipient	Notes
Most wins	Atlee	2
Most wins	Lokesh Kanagaraj	2
Most wins	Vetrimaaran	2
Most nominations	Vetrimaaran	6
Most consecutive nominations	Mari Selvaraj	3 (2023–2025)
Most nominations without a win	A. R. Murugadoss	4

== Winners ==
Year	Director	Film	Ref
2011	Vetrimaaran	Aadukalam	
2012	Balaji Sakthivel	Vazhakku Enn 18/9	
2013	Bala	Paradesi	
2014	Pa. Ranjith	Madras	
2015	Vignesh Shivan	Naanum Rowdy Dhaan	
2016	Atlee	Theri	
2017	Atlee	Mersal	
2018	Pandiraaj	Kadaikutty Singam	
2019	Vetrimaaran	Asuran	
2020	Sudha Kongara	Soorarai Pottru	
2021	Lokesh Kanagaraj	Master	
2022	Lokesh Kanagaraj	Vikram	
2023	Nelson Dilipkumar	Jailer	
2024	Rajkumar Periasamy	Amaran	
2025	Ashwath Marimuthu	Dragon	

== Nominations ==
- 2011: Vetrimaaran – Aadukalam
- 2012: Balaji Sakthivel – Vazhakku Enn 18/9
  - Prabhu Solomon – Kumki
  - A. R. Murugadoss – Thuppakki
  - S. R. Prabhakaran – Sundarapandian
  - K. V. Anand – Maattrraan
- 2013: Bala – Paradesi
  - Kamal Haasan – Vishwaroopam
  - Suseenthiran – Pandiya Naadu
  - Vishnuvardhan – Arrambam
  - Hari – Singam II
- 2014: Pa. Ranjith – Madras
  - A. R. Murugadoss – Kaththi
  - Vijay – Saivam
  - Vijay Milton – Goli Soda
  - Karthik Subbaraj – Jigarthanda
- 2015: Vignesh Shivan – Naanum Rowdy Dhaan
  - Mohan Raja – Thani Oruvan
  - Gautham Vasudev Menon – Yennai Arindhaal
  - K. V. Anand – Anegan
  - Mani Ratnam – O Kadhal Kanmani
- 2016: Atlee – Theri
  - M. Manikandan – Aandavan Kattalai
  - Raju Murugan – Joker
  - Sudha Kongara – Irudhi Suttru
  - Vetrimaaran – Visaranai
- 2017: Atlee – Mersal
  - Arun Prabu – Aruvi
  - Gopi Nainar – Aramm
  - H. Vinoth – Theeran Adhigaaram Ondru
  - Pushkar–Gayatri – Vikram Vedha
- 2018: Pandiraaj – Kadaikutty Singam
  - Ajay Gnanamuthu – Imaikka Nodigal
  - A. R. Murugadoss – Sarkar
  - S. Shankar – 2.0
  - Vetrimaaran – Vada Chennai
- 2019: Vetrimaaran – Asuran
  - Lokesh Kanagaraj – Kaithi
  - Thiagarajan Kumararaja – Super Deluxe
  - Ram – Peranbu
  - R. Parthiban – Oththa Seruppu Size 7
- 2020: Sudha Kongara – Soorarai Pottru
  - A. R. Murugadoss – Darbar
  - Mysskin – Psycho
  - R. S. Durai Senthilkumar – Pattas
- 2021: Lokesh Kanagaraj – Master
  - Nelson – Doctor
  - Mari Selvaraj – Karnan
  - Pa. Ranjith – Sarpatta Parambarai
  - A. L. Vijay – Thalaivii
  - Venkat Prabhu – Maanaadu
- 2022: Lokesh Kanagaraj – Vikram
  - Gautham Ramachandran – Gargi
  - M. Manikandan – Kadaisi Vivasayi
  - Mani Ratnam – Ponniyin Selvan: I
  - Mithran R. Jawahar – Thiruchitrambalam
- 2023: Nelson Dilipkumar – Jailer
  - Lokesh Kanagaraj – Leo
  - Mani Ratnam – Ponniyin Selvan: II
  - Mari Selvaraj – Maamannan
  - S. U. Arun Kumar – Chithha
  - Vetrimaaran – Viduthalai Part 1
- 2024: Rajkumar Periasamy – Amaran
  - C. Prem Kumar – Meiyazhagan
  - Mari Selvaraj – Vaazhai
  - Nithilan Saminathan – Maharaja
  - Pa. Ranjith – Thangalaan
  - Vetrimaaran – Viduthalai Part 2
- 2025: Ashwath Marimuthu – Dragon
  - Mari Selvaraj – Bison Kaalamaadan
  - Ram – Paranthu Po
  - Sri Ganesh – 3BHK
  - S. U. Arun Kumar – Veera Dheera Sooran
