= Ko Sesha =

Indian lyricist and dialogue writer

- Citizenship: India
- Occupation: Lyricist

Ko Sesha is an Indian lyricist and dialogue writer working on Tamil language films. After making his debut in Kanchana 2 (2015), he received critical acclaim for his work in Oh My Kadavule (2020).

== Early life and career ==
Sesha was brought up in Chennai and did his schooling in Padma Seshadri Bala Bhavan. He was a part of the school’s theatre group, writing scripts for, acting in and directing school plays. As a teen, he was inspired by the works of lyricist Vaali. As a youth, he contributed regularly as a writer to The Hindu's youth publications.

Sesha then made his first film song "Vaaya En Veera" in Leon James's music in the successful Kanchana 2 (2015). Leon had been a junior of Sesha at school, and the pair regularly later collaborated for other films including Kavalai Vendam (2016), Veera (2018), LKG (2019) and Oh My Kadavule (2020). He has also worked on several songs composed by the Vivek-Mervin duo, Vijay Antony, Hiphop Tamizha and S. Thaman.

He made a guest appearance as an actor in the music video "Suzhaluren" directed by Rajath Ravishankar, composed by Leon James.

His latest release was in the commercially successful Aranmanai 4 and his upcoming projects include Dragon starring Pradeep Ranganathan.

== Notable discography ==
=== As a lyricist ===
==== Films ====
Year	Film	Songs	Composer
2015	Kanchana 2	Vaaya En Veera	Leon James
2015	Moone Moonu Varthai	Vaazhum Naal	Karthikeya Murthy
2016	Kavalai Vendam	Un Kaadhal Irundhal Podhum, Un Kaadhal Irundhal Podhum (Reprise), En Pulse Yethitu Poriye, Nee Tholaindhaayo	Leon James
2016	Saithan	Saithan Theme	Vijay Antony
2017	Yaman	Kadavul Ezhuthum	Vijay Antony
2017	Veera	Verrattama Verratturiye, Oottaanda	Leon James
2017	Gulaebaghavali	Seramal Ponaal, You're The One	Vivek–Mervin
2018	Vedigundu Pasangge	Vizhiye Kalangathey	Vivek-Mervin
2019	LKG	Ethanai Kaalam Thaan	Leon James
2019	Kannaadi	Kannai Kaatti	S. Thaman
2019	Madhura Raja	Mogatheeyinai Yetridum Raasa	Gopi Sundar
2020	Oh My Kadavule	Friendship Anthem, Haiyyo Haiyyo, Kadhaippoma, Ennada Life Idhu, Kadhal Kozhappudhey, Marappadhillai Nenje	Leon James
2020	Unarvugal Thodarkadhai	Alaya, Minsaaramaai	Hari Dafusia
2021	Theeni	Undhan Siripinile, Naan Ketten, Uyire Suzhaludhey	Rajesh Murugesan
2021	Sivakumarin Sabadham	Nesamae - The World of Sivakumar	Hiphop Tamizha
2022	Single Shankarum Smartphone Simranum	Soru Dhaan Mukkiyam, Sodi Seralam, Smartphone Senorita	Leon James
2022	Vallan	Jillu Jakkamma	Santhosh Dhayanidhi
2023	Saba Nayagan	Babyma	Leon James
2024	Aranmanai 4	Jo Jo, Oyile Oyile	Hiphop Tamizha
2025	Dragon	Vazhithunaiye (co-written with Vignesh Shivan), Yendi Vittu Pona, Maname Maname, Iraivaa	Leon James

==== Independent ====
Year	Song	Composer	Notes
2018	Kanne Kanne	Leon James	7UP Madras Gig Season - 1
2019	Poraali Penne	Keba Jeremiah	7UP Madras Gig Season - 2
2019	Adiyathe	Swagatha Krishnan	Behindwoods TV
2020	Kanmani	Gaurav Dagaonkar	Doublemint Freshtake Season - 1
2020	Priyasakhi	Jonita Gandhi	
2020	Suzhaluren	Leon James	Also featured as actor
2021	Unakkaaga Naan Irupen	Leon James	
2021	Unna Nenachida	Mohammed Afsal	Starring Mahat Raghavendra & Prachi Mishra
2021	Chinna Pack'la Periya Heart'u	Gaurav Dagaonkar	Doublemint Freshtake Season - 1
2022	Hey Enna Parva	Jonita Gandhi	
2022	Killadi Rani	Leon James	
2022	Kana Vibe	Leon James, Bjorn Surrao	Kana Kaanum Kaalangal
2022	Mayilu	Supaveen & Vidusan	

=== As a dialogue writer ===
==== Films ====
Year	Film	Director	Notes
2022	Ghani	Kiran Korrapati	Tamil-dubbed version
2023	Dhamki	Vishwak Sen	Tamil-dubbed version

== Awards and nominations ==
- Mirchi Music Awards South:
  - 2020: Listener's Choice of the Year - Tamil for "Kadhaippoma" from Oh My Kadavule: Won
  - 2020: Best Lyricist - Tamil for "Kadhaippoma" from Oh My Kadavule: Nominated
- Filmfare Awards South:
  - 2020: Best Lyricist - Tamil for "Kadhaippoma" from Oh My Kadavule: Nominated
- SIIMA Awards:
  - 2020: Best Lyricist - Tamil for "Kadhaippoma" from Oh My Kadavule: Nominated
- Vikatan Awards:
  - 2020: Best Lyricist for "Kadhaippoma" from Oh My Kadavule: Nominated
  - 2025: Best Lyricist for "Vazhithunaiye" from Dragon: Nominated
- Edison Awards:
  - 2020: Best Lyricist - Tamil for "Marappadhillai Nenje" from Oh My Kadavule: Nominated
