= AGS Entertainment =

Indian entertainment company

AGS Entertainment Pvt. Ltd
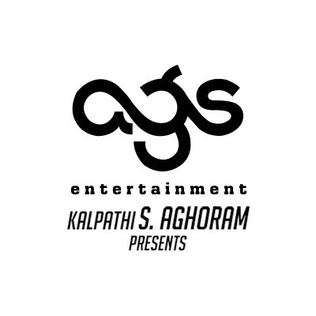
- Type: Private
- Industry: Entertainment
- Founded: 2006
- Headquarters: Chennai, Tamil Nadu, India
- Key people: Kalpathi S. Aghoram; Kalpathi S. Ganesh; Kalpathi S. Suresh; Archana Kalpathi; Aishwarya Kalpathi
- Owner: Kalpathi Family
- Number of employees: 133 Employees
- Parent: Kalpathi Investments

AGS Entertainment is an Indian film production, distribution company, and multiplex chain in Chennai, Tamil Nadu. It was established in 2006 by Kalpathi brothers: S. Aghoram, S. Ganesh, and S. Suresh. AGS has four multiplex movie theaters across Chennai.

== History ==
AGS Entertainment ventured into film production in 2006 with Susi Ganesan's Thiruttu Payale (2006), which was followed by Santosh Subramaniam (2008), both emerging commercial successes. Their subsequent productions included the masala flick Maasilamani (2009), Chimbudevan's Western comedy Irumbukkottai Murattu Singam (2010), the period piece Madrasapattinam, Bale Pandiya (2010), Myshkin's crime thriller Yuddham Sei (2011), Bala's comedy entertainer Avan Ivan (2011), Prabhu Deva directed romance film Engeyum Kadhal (2011), Vellore Maavattam (2011) starring Nandha, the K. V. Anand-Suriya project Maattrraan (2012) and Atlee directed sports action film Bigil (2019), while the distribution of films includes Kandhakottai, Inidhu Inidhu, Mynaa and Payanam.

In 2013, AGS Entertainment opened their first cinema theatre in Villivakkam, Chennai. Subsequently, in the following year, they launched AGS OMR,Navalur, and in 2016, another theater in T Nagar. They eventually opened another theatre in Maduravoyal as well.

== Productions ==
- All films are in Tamil, unless mentioned otherwise.

Key
| † | Denotes films that have not yet been released |

List of AGS Entertainment film productions
| Year | Title | Cast | Director | Notes | Ref. |
|---|---|---|---|---|---|
| 2006 | Thiruttu Payale | Jeevan, Sonia Agarwal, Malavika | Susi Ganesan | | |
| 2008 | Santosh Subramaniam | Ravi Mohan, Genelia D'Souza, Prakash Raj | Mohan Raja | | |
| 2009 | Maasilamani | Nakul, Sunaina, Pawan | R. N. R. Manohar | | |
| 2010 | Madrasapattinam | Arya, Amy Jackson, Nassar | A. L. Vijay | | |
| 2010 | Irumbukkottai Murattu Singam | Raghava Lawrence, Raai Laxmi, Sandhya | Chimbu Deven | | |
| 2010 | Bale Pandiya | Vishnu Vishal, Pia Bajpiee, Vivek | Siddharth Chandrasekhar | | |
| 2011 | Engeyum Kaadhal | Ravi Mohan, Hansika Motwani, Suman | Prabhu Deva | | |
| 2011 | Yuddham Sei | Cheran, Dipa Shah, Y. G. Mahendran | Mysskin | | |
| 2011 | Avan Ivan | Vishal, Arya, Janani Iyer | Bala | | |
| 2011 | Vellore Maavattam | Nandha, Poorna, Santhanam | R. N. R. Manohar | | |
| 2012 | Maatrraan | Suriya, Kajal Aggarwal, Sachin Khedekar | K. V. Anand | | |
| 2013 | Naveena Saraswathi Sabatham | Jai, Nivetha Thomas, VTV Ganesh | K. Chandru | | |
| 2014 | Tenaliraman | Vadivelu, Meenakshi Dixit, Radha Ravi | Yuvaraj Dhayalan | | |
| 2014 | Irumbu Kuthirai | Atharvaa, Priya Anand, Raai Laxmi | Yuvraj Bose | | |
| 2015 | Anegan | Dhanush, Karthik, Amyra Dastur | K. V. Anand | | |
| 2015 | Vai Raja Vai | Gautham Karthik, Priya Anand, Vivek | Aishwarya R. Dhanush | | |
| 2015 | Thani Oruvan | Ravi Mohan, Nayanthara, Arvind Swami | Mohan Raja | | |
| 2017 | Kavan | Vijay Sethupathi, T. Rajendar, Madonna Sebastian | K. V. Anand | | |
| 2017 | Thiruttu Payale 2 | Bobby Simha, Prasanna, Amala Paul | Susi Ganesan | | |
| 2019 | Bigil | Vijay, Nayanthara, Jackie Shroff | Atlee | | |
| 2022 | Naai Sekar | Sathish, Bruno, Pavithra Lakshmi | Kishore Rajkumar | | |
| 2022 | Love Today | Pradeep Ranganathan, Ivana, Raveena Ravi | Pradeep Ranganathan | | |
| 2023 | Conjuring Kannappan | Sathish, Regina Cassandra, Saranya Ponvannan | Selvin Raj Xavier | | |
| 2024 | The Greatest of All Time | Vijay, Prashanth, Mohan | Venkat Prabhu | | |
| 2025 | Loveyapa | Khushi Kapoor, Junaid Khan | Advait Chandan | Hindi film | |
| 2025 | Dragon | Pradeep Ranganathan, Anupama Parameswaran, Kayadu Lohar | Ashwath Marimuthu | | |
| 2026 | Blast | Arjun, Abhirami, Preity Mukhundhan | Subash K. Raj | also distributor | |

== Distribution ==
List of films distributed by AGS Entertainment
| Year | Title | Director | Notes |
|---|---|---|---|
| 2009 | Kandhakottai | S. Sakthivel | |
| 2010 | Inidhu Inidhu | K. V. Guhan | |
| 2010 | Mynaa | Prabhu Solomon | |
| 2011 | Payanam | Radha Mohan | |
| 2011 | Avan Ivan | Bala | |
| 2014 | Tenaliraman | Yuvaraj Dhayalan | |
| 2015 | Anegan | K. V. Anand | |
| 2015 | Thani Oruvan | Mohan Raja | |
| 2017 | Kavan | K. V. Anand | |
| 2019 | Bigil | Atlee | |
| 2024 | Pushpa 2: The Rule | Sukumar | Tamil Nadu distribution |
| 2025 | Dragon | Ashwath Marimuthu | |
| 2025 | House Mates | T. Raja Vel | |
| 2025 | Lokah Chapter 1: Chandra | Dominic Arun | Tamil Nadu distribution |
| 2025 | Mirai | Karthik Ghattamneni | Tamil Nadu distribution |
| 2025 | Balti | Unni Sivalingam | |
| 2025 | Dude | Keerthiswaran | Tamil Nadu distribution |
| 2025 | Aan Paavam Pollathathu | Kalaiarasan Thangavel | Tamil Nadu distribution |
| 2025 | Kaantha | Selvamani Selvaraj | Tamil Nadu distribution |
| 2026 | Seetha Payanam | Arjun Sarja | Tamil Nadu distribution |
| 2026 | Thaai Kizhavi | Sivakumar Murugesan | Tamil Nadu distribution |
| 2026 | Baththa | Balaji Tharaneetharan | Tamil Nadu distribution |
| 2026 | John Doe | Madhumitha | Tamil Nadu distribution |
| 2026 | OM | Rajkumar Periasamy | |

== Multiplexes ==
List of AGS Entertainment multiplexes
| Year | Multiplex Name | # of Screens | Locality | City | State | Ref. |
|---|---|---|---|---|---|---|
| 2010 | AGS Cinemas, Villivakkam | 5 | Villivakkam | Chennai | Tamil Nadu | |
| 2014 | AGS Cinemas, Navalur | 4 | Navalur | Chennai | Tamil Nadu | |
| 2016 | AGS Cinemas, T Nagar | 4 | T Nagar | Chennai | Tamil Nadu | |
| 2018 | AGS Cinemas, Maduravoyal | 5 | Maduravoyal | Chennai | Tamil Nadu | |
