= Pradeep E. Ragav =

Indian film editor (born 1991)

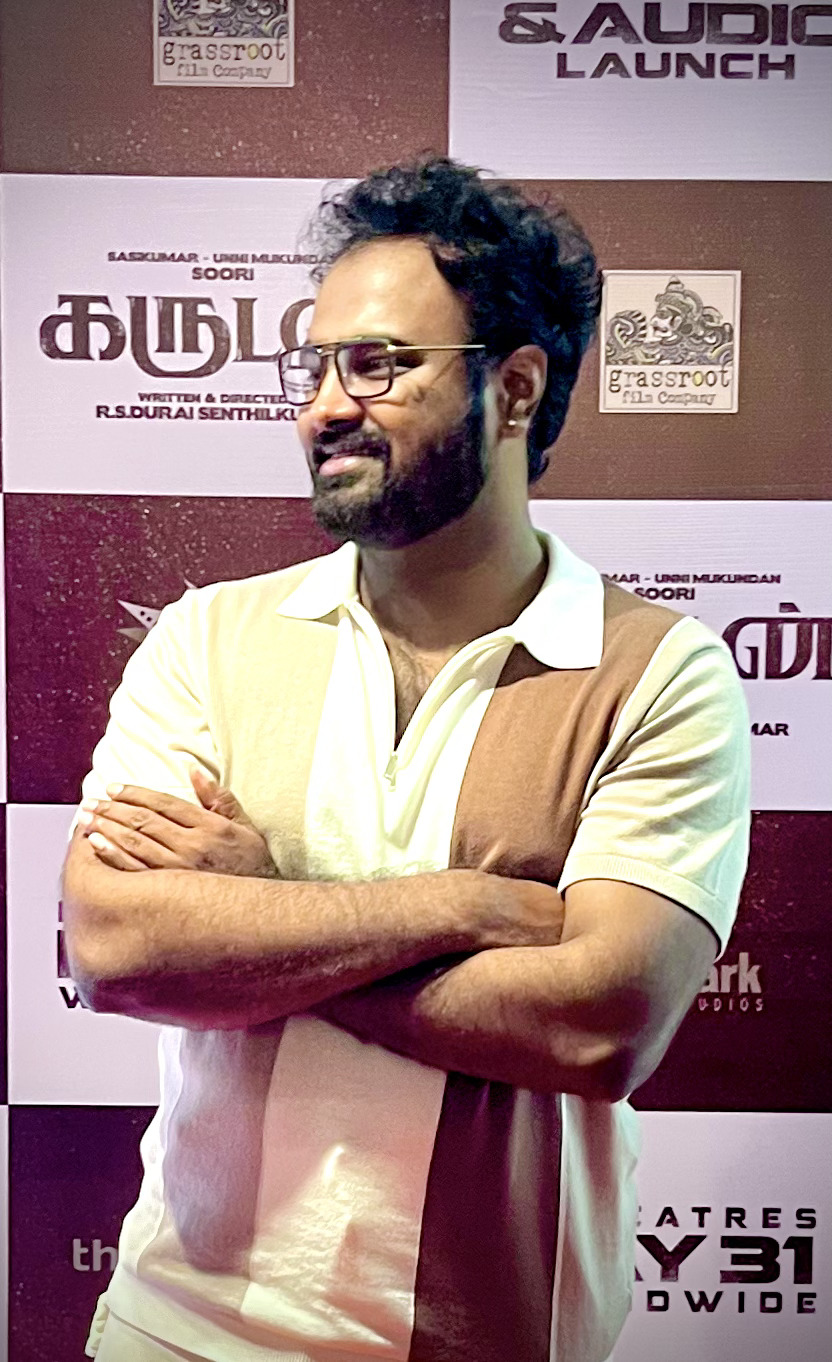
- Born: India
- Citizenship: India
- Occupation: Film editor

Pradeep E. Ragav is an Indian film editor, who works predominantly in the Tamil film industry.

== Career ==
He made his first debut as an editor in Tamil film Kathakali in 2016. Pradeep got his major breakthrough in a science-fiction film Tik Tik Tik. After Tik Tik Tik, Pradeep went on to edit many films such as Comali and many more.

== Filmography ==
Year	Film	Language	Notes
2016	Kathakali	Tamil	Debut
2017	Bruce Lee	Tamil	
2018	Tik Tik Tik	Tamil	
2018	Semma	Tamil	
2018	Neevevaro	Telugu	Debut in Telugu cinema
2019	Comali	Tamil	
2021	Paramapadham Vilayattu	Tamil	
2021	Anbirkiniyal	Tamil	
2021	Annabelle Sethupathi	Tamil	
2022	Anbarivu	Tamil	
2022	Malli Modalaindi	Telugu	
2022	Captain	Tamil	
2022	Love Today	Tamil	
2023	Let's Get Married	Tamil	
2023	Love You Abhi	Kannada	Television series
2024	Star	Tamil	
2024	Garudan	Tamil	
2024	Darling	Telugu	
2024	Kadaisi Ulaga Por	Tamil	
2024	Nayanthara: Beyond the Fairytale	Tamil	Netflix documentary film
2025	Dragon	Tamil	
2025	Thalaivan Thalaivii	Tamil	
2026	Leader	Tamil	
2026	Love Insurance Kompany	Tamil	
2026	Blast	Tamil	
2026	Idhayam Murali	Tamil	
2026	Jana Nayagan	Tamil	25th film
2026	Pyaar Prema Kalyanam	Tamil	
2026	Mandaadi	Tamil	
2027	Dharman	Tamil	
