= LKG (film) =

2019 Indian Tamil-language film by K. R. Prabhu

- Theatrical release poster
- Directed by: K. R. Prabhu
- Written by: RJ Balaji
- Additional dialogue: Era. Murugan; Pradeep Ranganathan; Mani. Vignesh Kumar
- Produced by: Ishari K. Ganesh
- Starring: RJ Balaji; Priya Anand
- Cinematography: Vidhu Ayyanna
- Edited by: Anthony
- Music by: Leon James
- Production company: Vels Film International
- Distributed by: Sakthi Film Factory
- Release date: 22 February 2019
- Running time: 124 minutes
- Country: India
- Language: Tamil

LKG (an initialism for Lalgudi Karuppiah Gandhi) is a 2019 Indian Tamil-language political satire film directed by K. R. Prabhu in his directorial debut and produced by Ishari K. Ganesh. The film stars RJ Balaji and Priya Anand, while J. K. Rithesh, Ramkumar Ganesan, Nanjil Sampath, and Mayilsamy play supporting roles. It revolves around a councillor who, while building his political career, becomes increasingly cunning. Leon James composed the music, while Vidhu Ayyanna and Anthony handled the cinematography and editing, respectively. The film was released on 22 February 2019 to positive reviews and performed well at the box office.

== Plot ==
Lalgudi Karupaiah Gandhi (LKG) is a councillor from Lalgudi, Tiruchirappalli and belongs to the ruling party. He aspires to quickly achieve big in politics, unlike his father Azhagu Meiyappan, who neither achieved fame as a politician nor made substantial money. Avudaiyappan Mudhaliar, the incumbent Chief Minister of Tamil Nadu and ruling party chief, falls ill and is hospitalised, while Bojappan, the party general secretary, becomes the interim CM. Since Avudaiyappan is the MLA from Lalgudi, LKG decides to put all efforts to contest in the by-election on behalf of the ruling party once Avudaiyappan dies.

LKG feels he needs to create some media visibility to get into Bojappan's good books. He receives the paid help of Sara M. Samy, an employee of V Analytica, an MNC involved in election strategy formulation. LKG goes to Delhi to protest and create an awareness against diseases, which gets media attention. Finally, LKG gets Bojappan's attention and meets him at party headquarters in Daryaganj. Within a week, Avudaiyappan dies, Bojappan becomes the new CM, and a by-election is scheduled in the Lalgudi constituency. Bojapan urgently announces that LKG is the by-election candidate at the party's general body meeting. Most of the party members and ministers disagree with Bojappan's decision.

The ruling party's deputy-general secretary Ramraj Pandian, who was abroad when Avudaiyappan died, comes to the meeting hall, furious and betrayed by Bojappan's actions. He reminds him that he had been elected as MLA from Lalgudi, his hometown, in a hat trick for the last 17 years, and only relinquished the seat because of Avudaiyappan's personal request in the previous general election. He announces that he will contest in the election as an independent candidate, and once he wins, Bojappan will be expelled from the party and government, while he becomes the new CM.

LKG realises the hardships of contesting in the elections. He understands that people favour Ramraj because of his strong influence, hard work, caste, and image. Most of the state ministers, ruling party bigwigs, and MLAs do not work for LKG as they want to remain neutral to join the victor of the by-election. LKG devises a strategy to tarnish Ramraj's image with the help of meme creators and his sidekicks. He spreads rumours that Ramraj is actually a woman disguised as a man, which results in the public trolling Ramraj on social media. Ramraj is also insulted when he is unable to sing "Tamil Thai Valthu" during a college function. Ramraj discovers that V Analytica is behind LKG and strikes a deal with Sara to support him.

Per Sara's advice, Ramraj goes to Delhi and meets the national ruling party leaders. He also tries to break the ruling party of Tamil Nadu and prevent Bojappan from taking all the party MLAs to a resort. It is revealed that Sara was actually pretending to be on Ramraj's side. She returns to help LKG, but a tussle comes within the party, while some senior party leaders do not want LKG to gain fame. However, Bojappan favours LKG. During the election, LKG wins against Ramraj, but Bojappan gets arrested in corruption cases, and LKG becomes the CM-elect due to Bojappan's efforts.

The next morning, LKG is at the podium to be sworn in, but is shot by a sniper. (Note: Shown at the start of the film in medias res.) However, he survives as he was wearing a bulletproof vest, having anticipated such an incident. LKG tells the media that he is in to bring change and that he has transferred the corruption cases against Bojappan to the CBI. He also says numerous educated youngsters are contesting in elections independently to bring change, but they go unnoticed by the public because of big political parties staying in the limelight. The sniper is convinced, and the entire state believes in LKG. However, Sara smiles upon seeing LKG; he is just becoming a corrupt politician through his speech, trying to woo the public, which was her strategy as well to win people's hearts. Also, LKG silently reveals that he never intends to bring Bojappan out of prison.

== Cast ==
- RJ Balaji as Lalgudi Karupaiah Gandhi (LKG)
- Priya Anand as Sarala Munusamy (Sara M. Samy)
- J. K. Rithesh as Ramraj Pandian (Pandiamma)
- Ramkumar Ganesan as Bojappan
- Nanjil Sampath as Azhagu Meiyappan
- Mayilsamy as LKG's uncle
- Manobala as Mukesh
- Santhana Bharathi as a politician
- Varun as the sniper
- Vinodhini Vaidyanathan as Bhagya Rajappan
- Redin Kingsley as Ramraj's henchman
- Vijay Sivan as the road contractor
- Ananth Vaidyanathan as Avudaiyappan Mudhaliar (Note: Not credited among the cast, but under "Our Sincere Thanks To".)
- Bijili Ramesh as a drunkard (uncredited)

== Production ==
LKG was officially announced in May 2018. It is the directorial debut of K. R. Prabhu, who previously worked as an associate of Prabhu Deva. K. R. Prabhu is the son of producer K. Rajan, and had previously worked as an actor in films including Doubles (2000) and Ninaikkatha Naalillai (2001). LKG was produced by Ishari K. Ganesh of Vels Film International. The filmmakers hired RJ Balaji to play the lead role as Lalgudi Karuppiah Gandhi, making his first leading role in a film. He also wrote the story and screenplay, while cinematography was handled by Vidhu Ayyanna, and editing by Anthony.

Priya Anand accepted the female lead role as she felt her character was well-written and exciting. Ramarajan was originally offered to portray the antagonist, but declined due to the character's introduction only mid-way through the film; J. K. Rithesh was instead chosen, and LKG became his final film as actor before his death in April 2019. Rithesh said he accepted the role because of his friendship with Ganesh. Political orator Nanjil Sampath made his acting debut. One song sequence was directed by Vignesh Shivan; it was shot in various locations in New Delhi, that includes India Gate, Janpath, Rajpath, the Parliament House, and Chandni Chowk. According to Priya Anand, these scenes were difficult to film due to the "early morning to late night" shoots in crowded places.

== Soundtrack ==
The soundtrack and background score for LKG is composed by Leon James. The audio rights were acquired by Think Music. Leon recreated the song "Ethanai Kaalam Dhaan" from Malaikkallan (1954), featuring additional lyrics by Ko Sesha and released it as single on Republic Day, 26 January 2019. The remix version was sung by Sean Roldan. The second single, "Thimiru Kattaadha Di", was released on 7 February 2019.

The third single "Dappava Kizhichaan" was released on 10 February 2019. The lyrical video of "Tamizh Anthem" was released by Anirudh Ravichander on 20 February 2019, coinciding with World Mother Tongue Day. The song features elements of "Tamil Thai Valthu" written by Manonmaniam Sundaram Pillai, which was separately included in the soundtrack album.

Track listing
No.	Title	Lyrics	Singer(s)	Length
1.	"Ethanai Kaalam Dhaan" (remix)	Thanjai N. Ramaiah Dass, Ko Sesha	Sean Roldan	4:22
2.	"Thimiru Kaattadha Di"	Vignesh Shivan	D. Sathyaprakash	3:58
3.	"Dappava Kizhichaan"	Pa. Vijay	Shruti Haasan	4:11
4.	"Tamizh Anthem"	Pa. Vijay	Sid Sriram, Chinmayi, P. Susheela, L. R. Eswari, Vani Jairam	4:52
5.	"Ini Oru Vidhi Seivom"	Pa. Vijay	D. Sathyaprakash, Diwakar	3:52
6.	"Tamil Thai Valthu"	Manonmaniam Sundaram Pillai	P. Susheela, L. R. Eswari, Vani Jairam	1:14
Total length:				22:29

== Marketing and release ==
The announcement of the film was done on Star Sports Tamil after a huge buzz created by the team releasing posters announcing Balaji's entry into politics. The release date was officially announced by the team on 11 February 2019 from the #BlueRoom at Twitter Headquarters, Mumbai. LKG is the first South Indian film to use the Twitter #BlueRoom for announcement of release date of film.

LKG was initially scheduled to release in January 2019 during the Pongal festival, clashing with Petta and Viswasam; however the release was postponed. The theatrical rights of the film in Tamil Nadu were sold to Sakthi Film Factory, and the rights in Karnataka to ANK Films. The film was released on 22 February 2019. It had its television premiere on Sun TV on 14 April 2019, coinciding with the Tamil New Year Day.

=== Critical reception ===
While M. Suganth of The Times of India said that this is a "satisfying political satire film and in-arguably the best of recent politics based movies", S. Subhakeerthana of The Indian Express notes that in spite of it being a "crowd-pleaser", the story "doesn't rise above spoofing the clichéd political characters and situations". Sify appreciated the film's "satirical take on contemporary murky politics" in the country, and noted that Balaji's comic timing and image was "another big advantage".

Baradwaj Rangan wrote for Film Companion, "LKG, [...] is more about the writing (credited to "RJ Balaji & friends") — and like many films of this genre, it works when the gags work, and falls flat when they don't" and that Balaji "does well in this tailormade part". S. Srivatsan of The Hindu wrote, "The problem with LKG is that it can hardly be viewed as a film, but a culmination of video memes and trolls on the political developments in the State. The intent — to write a political satire — is appreciable, but not the writing".

=== Box office ===
LKG grossed ₹1.38 crore (equivalent to ₹1.7 crore or US$180,000 in 2023) in Tamil Nadu within the first three days of its release. By early March it had grossed almost ₹20 crore (equivalent to ₹25 crore or US$2.6 million in 2023) worldwide, and according to trade analyst Sreedhar Pillai, was the "fastest film in recent times" to succeed based on return on investment.

== In other media ==
The title character of LKG makes a faceless cameo in Mookuthi Amman (2020). In Karuppu (2026), Balaji briefly portrays Usilampatti Karuppiah Gandhi (UKG), a character serving as an homage to his role from LKG.
