= What If Batman Was From Chennai? =

- Directed by: Tushar Ramakrishnan
- Written by: Balakumaran
- Starring: Delhi Ganesh; Aswin Rao; Sainath Saikrishnan; Lakshmi Priyaa Chandramouli
- Cinematography: Niketh Bommireddy
- Edited by: Part 1: Prashanth Tamilmani; Part 2: Kripakaran Purushothaman
- Production company: Put Chutney
- Distributed by: YouTube
- Release date: 8 April 2015
- Running time: Part 1: 8 minutes and 21 seconds Part 2: 12 minutes and 34 seconds
- Country: India
- Languages: English; Tamil

What If Batman Was From Chennai? is a 2015 satirical viral video that offers a take on what if Batman didn't live in Gotham City and instead in the fictional neighborhood of Batmanabhapuram in Chennai. The video shows Batman adapted to Indian standards including being part of a middle class family, wearing a lungi, being compared to his family friend Srinivasan's son who has an IT job, and getting a speeding ticket. The video also shows Catwoman wearing a sari and a bindi.

Although this video shows Batman as commitment phobic, the sequel/prequel video titled Batman Returns... To Chennai | The Middle Ages deviates from the comics and shows Batman giving into Indian standards and marrying Catwoman.

== Cast and characters ==
The inclusion of Iron Man in the video indicates that it is part of a shared DC-Marvel universe. However, Iron Man was played by a different actor in the What if The Avengers Were From South India? video by Put Chutney.

- Source

Cast	Main videos	
Cast	What If Batman Was From Chennai?	Batman Returns... To Chennai | The Middle Ages
Delhi Ganesh	Alfred / Anantha Padmanabhan	Alfred / Anantha Padmanabhan
Aswin Rao	Batman / Brusothaman Waynekatraman	Batman / Brusothaman Waynekatraman
Sainath Saikrishnan	Joker	
Lakshmi Priyaa Chandramouli	Catwoman / Mythili	Catwoman / Mythili
Geevee Vignesh	Man with Toothbrush	Robin
Anantharaman	Police Constable	Inspector Garudan
Balakumaran	Waiter	Waiter
Balakumaran		Scarecrow
Tushar Ramakrishnan	Scooty Rider (Note: who calls Batman's cape a dupatta.)	
Tushar Ramakrishnan	Crowd member at TASMAC	
Suvi Kumar	Crowd member at TASMAC	
Rajiv Rajaram	Batman / Brusothaman Waynekatraman (Note: voice only)	Batman / Brusothaman Waynekatraman
Rajiv Rajaram	Crowd member at TASMAC	
Uma Padmanabhan		Talia / Uma Aunty
T. M. Karthik		Lucius Fox / Otteri Nari
Put Chutney Rajmohan		Saroj Karuppasamy
—N/a		Poison Ivy (Uncredited silent cameo) (Note: who texts Catwoman in WhatsApp)
—N/a		Superman / Clark Kent (Mentioned) (Note: mentioned by Uma Aunty)

== Production ==
The video was made by the YouTube channel Put Chutney, which is owned by the Mumbai-based Culture Machine group, and its story is based on a meme by Balakumaran. Aswin Rao, assistant creative director of Culture Machine South, played the role of Batman, which he felt was easy since he wore a mask most of the time. According to him, the casting of Delhi Ganesh for the role of Alfred increased the scale of the project.

== Reception ==
Raveena Joseph of The Hindu wrote, "the video proves to be a laugh riot with a strong city connect". A critic from NDTV wrote that the short film is "fun, but too long". A critic from Firstpost wrote, "we dare you not to laugh". A critic from the Hindustan Times wrote, "A desi Batman, more like a Tamilian Batman, is in the house, more like on YouTube. And he is hilarious". A critic from IBN Live wrote, "This hilarious video by 'Put Chutney' tells us that "He's not the hero you deserve, but he's the mappillai (transl. groom) you need". (Note: This dialogue is a play on "Because he's the hero Gotham needs, but not the one it deserves right now" from The Dark Knight (2008).) A critic from Storypick wrote, "Put Chutney already had that evil idea when they made this fantabulously hilarious video of Batman, if he were from Chennai".
