= Sai University =

Private university in Tamil Nadu, India

- Type: Private
- Established: 2018
- Chancellor: K. V. Ramani
- Vice-Chancellor: Ajith Abraham
- Location: Paiyanur, Tamil Nadu, India; 12°39′15″N 80°09′28″E
- Website: saiuniversity.edu.in

Sai University is a private university located on SH-49A near Paiyanur, Thirupporur block, Kancheepuram district, Tamil Nadu, India. Established in 2018, It is one of the first private universities to be legislated in by the Tamil Nadu government for over 90 years, since the establishment of Annamalai University.

== History ==
Sai University is the brainchild of the founder-chancellor K.V. Ramani, an Indian entrepreneur who donated more than 85% of his wealth to the Sri Sai Trust (by its full name, the Sai Education, Medical, Research and Charitable Trust), which promoted the university. The trust committed to investing ₹320 crore (US$33 million) in building the infrastructure for the university.

Ramani approached the state government in January 2018 which led to the introduction of the Sai University Act, 2018. The Bill was passed by the Tamil Nadu Legislative Assembly in July 2018 together with the bill establishing Shiv Nadar University, the first private universities to be legislated in Tamil Nadu for over 90 years, since the establishment of Annamalai University. Jamshed Bharucha was appointed the founding vice chancellor of the university in July 2020 and the foundation stone was laid by chief minister (CM) Edappadi K. Palaniswami in August 2020. The university opened admission for year 2021–22 in January 2021, in the schools of arts and sciences, computing and data science and the school of law. It started operation in August 2021. The academic buildings were inaugurated by CM M. K. Stalin in May 2022.
