= Niketh Bommi =

Indian cinematographer

- Years active: 2015–present
- Notable work: Soorarai Pottru (2020)

Niketh Bommireddy, better known as Niketh Bommi, is an Indian cinematographer who predominantly works in Telugu and Tamil films.

== Background ==
Niketh, a Telugu who was raised in Chennai, holds a degree in electronics and communications engineering. His interest in cinematography developed while making short films with friends during the rise of digital filmmaking and the 5D revolution. He went on to study at Mindscreen Film Institute, founded by cinematographer Rajiv Menon, where he trained under dean M. N. Gnanasekaran.

During the COVID-19 lockdown, Niketh shot a mini video titled Solace using his RED Epic Dragon Camera, which he affectionately named "Rohini". In 2024, Niketh was brought on board to work as the cinematographer for the film, Dragon, produced by AGS Entertainment.

On 20 August 2022, Niketh married his long-time girlfriend, Mercy John, in Chennai. Mercy John is a dubbing artist and actress.

== Filmography ==
=== As cinematographer ===
Year	Title	Language	Notes	Refs
2015	What If Batman Was From Chennai? Batman Returns... To Chennai: The Middle Ages	English; Tamil	short films	
2017	Yuddham Sharanam	Telugu		
2018	Ee Nagaraniki Emaindhi	Telugu		
2018	U Turn	Tamil; Telugu		
2020	Soorarai Pottru	Tamil		
2020	Putham Pudhu Kaalai	Tamil	Segment: Ilamai Idho Idho	
2021	Pitta Kathalu	Telugu		
2022	Bloom	Tamil	Short film	
2022	Ante Sundaraniki	Telugu		
2024	Sarfira	Hindi	Debut in Hindi cinema; Remake of Soorarai Pottru	
2024	35 Chinna Katha Kaadu	Telugu		
2025	Dragon	Tamil		
2025	Kuberaa	Telugu; Tamil		
2025	Dude	Tamil		
2027	Dharman †	Tamil		

== Awards ==
- Soorarai Pottru - Best Cinematographer Tamil, South Indian International Movie Awards.
- Soorarai Pottru - Best Cinematographer, Filmfare Awards South.
