= Shiv Nadar University, Chennai =

Private university in Tamil Nadu, India

- Type: Private
- Established: 1996(Because of SSN Chennai)
- Chancellor: R. Srinivasan
- Vice-Chancellor: Sriman Kumar Bhattacharyya
- Location: Kalavakkam, Thiruporur, Tamil Nadu, India
- Website: www.snuchennai.edu.in

Shiv Nadar University, Chennai (SNU Chennai) is a private university located on SH-49A in Kalavakkam village near Thiruporur, around 20 km south of Chennai in Tamil Nadu, India.

Starting in the 2026 academic year, Sri Sivasubramaniya Nadar College of Engineering. will merge with Shiv Nadar University Chennai. The new institution will be called the SSN School of Engineering within Shiv Nadar University.

It was launched in October 2020, the second university to be set up by the Shiv Nadar Foundation, following Shiv Nadar University, Dadri in Uttar Pradesh. It is the first private university to be legislated in Tamil Nadu in nine decades. It shares the campus with Sri Sivasubramaniya Nadar College of Engineering.

== History ==
The Shiv Nadar Foundation was established in 1994 by Shiv Nadar, Founder - HCL – US$ 11 billion leading global enterprise. The university came up as a result of a memorandum signed between HCL Technologies and the Government of Tamil Nadu in 2015 to facilitate the creation of a private university and another memorandum signed by HCL and Electronics Corporation of Tamil Nadu (ELCOT) in 2016. The university was legislated through the Shiv Nadar University Act, 2018 which was passed in July 2018 together with the act legislating Sai University, the first private universities to be legislated in Tamil Nadu in nine decades, since the legislation of Annamalai University.

The university was launched in October 2020. Sriman Kumar Bhattacharyya was appointed the founding vice chancellor of the university in March 2021.
