= Leon James (composer) =

Indian film composer and singer

- Born: 1 December 1991 (age 34); Chennai, Tamil Nadu, India
- Origin: Tamil Nadu, India
- Occupations: Film composer; Music director
- Instrument: keyboard/piano

Leon James is an Indian film composer and singer who works in Tamil and Telugu films. He made his debut by composing two songs for the Tamil film, Kanchana 2 (2015) directed by Raghava Lawrence, before being noticed for his work in Ko 2 (2016).

== Early life ==
Leon James became interested in music as a result of his father Noel James's involvement in the industry as A. R. Rahman's manager. As a child, Leon was both a singer (as part of a chorus group) and pianist. He played in a school band called Zinx alongside Anirudh Ravichander, with the pair remaining close friends. He is also currently a part of Project Yuj, a "neo-Carnatic funk" band alongside Aalap Raju, Prakash Hariharan and Jeoraj George and the team released an independent album in November 2014. Prior to making his debut as a composer, Leon has worked as a keyboardist for stage shows and film albums composed by Santhosh Narayanan, Anirudh Ravichander and Thaman. Leon's father died in January 2025.

== Career ==
Leon James made a breakthrough in the Tamil film industry after his work was spotted by Raghava Lawrence, who was working on his horror comedy film Kanchana 2 (2015). Lawrence had heard a romantic melody song composed by Leon on YouTube and wanted it adapted to be used in his film, and subsequently brought the composer on board to work on the film's soundtrack. The song, "Vaayaa En Veera" sung by Shakthisree Gopalan, won positive reviews with Karthik Srinivasan noting that "Leon's music seems very new-agey" and his "sound is fresh, and purposefully cluttered". He later asked Leon to work on a further fast-paced song to be used in the film's climax, and the tune "Sandi Muni" was resultantly produced. The film went on to become amongst the profitable ventures of the year, with Leon's work noticed by critics. Soon after the release of the film in April 2015, he teamed up with singer Andrea Jeremiah to record a song called "Ezhunthu Vaa" to promote female empowerment.

The successful nature of his work in his first album prompted producer Elred Kumar to sign him up to work on the whole album for the political-thriller, Ko 2 (2015). The album of Ko 2 entailed of six tracks, with a promotional song titled "Unnai Maatrinal" released early as a tribute to former Indian President Abdul Kalam, consisting of lyrics based on his speeches. The album featured vocals from Bollywood artistes Vishal Dadlani, Salim Merchant and Neeti Mohan, while Chinmayi and Leon James, himself, also recorded songs. Leon James also chose to introduce Harish Sivaramakrishnan from the Bangalore-based rock band Agam and London-based singer Inno Genga, for their first respective songs in the Tamil film industry.

== Discography ==
=== As composer ===
==== Original soundtrack ====
Year	Work	Language	Notes
2015	Kanchana 2	Tamil	2 songs "Sandi Muni" and "Vaaya Veera"
2015	Ko 2	Tamil	
2016	Kavalai Vendam	Tamil	
2018	Veera	Tamil	
2018	Next Enti?	Telugu	
2018	Silukkuvarupatti Singam	Tamil	
2019	LKG	Tamil	
2020	Oh My Kadavule	Tamil	
2021	Paagal	Telugu	1 song "Kanapadava"; Background score
2022	Ori Devuda	Telugu	Remake of Oh My Kadavule
2023	Das Ka Dhamki	Telugu	
2023	Single Shankarum Smartphone Simranum	Tamil	
2023	Saba Nayagan	Tamil	
2025	Laila	Telugu	
2025	Dragon	Tamil	
2025	Mazaka	Telugu	
2025	Sundarakanda	Telugu	
2025	Premante	Telugu	
TBA	G.O.A.T †	Telugu	

=== As vocalist ===
==== Non-film songs ====
- 2015 – "Ezhunthu Vaa" (featuring Andrea Jeremiah)
- 2015 – "Punnagaiyya" (featuring Andrea Jeremiah)
- 2018 – "Kanne Kanne" (featuring Jonita Gandhi)
- 2020 - "Unna Vida Maaten" (featuring Andrea Jeremiah)
- 2020 - "Suzhaluren" (featuring Ko Sesha)
- 2021 - "Unakaaga Naan Irupen" (featuring Avinash Ashok & Shubhangi Jha)

==== Film songs ====
Year	Film	Song	Notes
2006	Varalaru	"Thottapuram"	composed by A. R. Rahman
2015	Kanchana 2	"Sandimuni"	
2015	Ko 2	"Kohila", "Vidaadha"	
2016	Kavalai Vendam	"En Pulse Yethitu Poriye"	
2017	Sakka Podu Podu Raja	"Unakkaga"	composed by Silambarasan
2018	Veera	"Ootaanda Soltuvaa"	
2020	Oh My Kadavule	"Haiyyo Haiyyo"	
2025	Mazaka	"Baby Ma"	Telugu song
2025	Dragon	"Rise of Dragon"	Telugu dubbed song
