= Love Today (2022 film) =

2022 Indian film by Pradeep Ranganathan

- Theatrical release poster
- Directed by: Pradeep Ranganathan
- Written by: Pradeep Ranganathan
- Based on: App(a) Lock by Pradeep Ranganathan
- Produced by: Kalpathi S. Aghoram; Kalpathi S. Ganesh; Kalpathi S. Suresh
- Starring: Pradeep Ranganathan; Ivana; Sathyaraj; Yogi Babu
- Cinematography: Dinesh Purushothaman
- Edited by: Pradeep E. Ragav
- Music by: Yuvan Shankar Raja
- Production company: AGS Entertainment
- Distributed by: Red Giant Movies
- Release date: 4 November 2022
- Running time: 154 minutes
- Country: India
- Language: Tamil
- Budget: ₹5 crore
- Box office: ₹105 Crore

Love Today is a 2022 Indian Tamil-language romantic comedy drama film directed by Pradeep Ranganathan and produced by AGS Entertainment. The film stars Pradeep in his debut as lead actor, and Ivana, with Raveena Ravi, Yogi Babu, Sathyaraj, Radhika Sarathkumar, Akshaya Udayakumar, Prathana Nathan, Adithya Kathir and Aajeedh Khalique in supporting roles. It is an adaptation of Pradeep's short film App(a) Lock (2020). The film follows a youngster who must swap his phone with his girlfriend for 24 hours before their marriage under the command of the girl's suspicious father.

The film was officially announced in October 2021 under the tentative title AGS 22, as it is the production banner's 22nd venture, and the official title was announced in July 2022. Principal photography commenced in December 2021. It was predominantly shot in Chennai, and wrapped by late-July 2022. The film has music composed by Yuvan Shankar Raja, cinematography handled by Dinesh Purushothaman, and editing by Pradeep E. Ragav.

Love Today was released theatrically on the 4th of November 2022. The film was a blockbuster, critical and commercial success, grossing ₹105 crore against a budget of ₹5 crore. Despite this, the film drew criticism for the sexist nature of the protagonists. The film was remade by the same producers in Hindi as Loveyapa (2025).

== Plot ==
Uthaman Pradeep is a 24-year-old support engineer at Cognizant in Chennai who lives with his widowed mother, Saraswathi, and his older sister, Divya. He is in a committed relationship with Nikitha, a software engineer at Infosys. The couple wishes to marry, but Pradeep is deeply intimidated by Nikitha's father, Venu Sastri, a highly eccentric and strict lawyer. When Venu uncovers their romance, he summons Pradeep to his house under the pretense of discussing wedding plans. Instead, he issues a psychological challenge: Pradeep and Nikitha must exchange their mobile phones for 24 hours with zero privacy restrictions. If they still want to marry after seeing each other's digital histories, Venu promises his blessing. Confident because he has thoroughly cleared his WhatsApp history, Pradeep reluctantly agrees.

Pradeep returns home to help organize Divya’s upcoming wedding to Yogi, a mild-mannered dentist. Urged by his friends, Pradeep begins digging through Nikitha's phone. He is dismayed to find intense conversations with Revi, her male best friend who harbors unrequited feelings for her, alongside lingering texts from her ex-boyfriend, Mamakutty. To his shock, he discovers that Nikitha recently lied to him to go on a late-night drive to Puducherry with Mamakutty. Following a bitter argument that severely strains their relationship, Pradeep impulsively suggests extending the phone swap until Divya’s wedding day. Venu immediately agrees to the extension, secretly instructing Nikitha to use data recovery tools to restore all of Pradeep's deleted WhatsApp threads.

As the wedding approaches, Divya grows suspicious of Yogi’s highly protective behavior regarding his own phone. Inspired by Pradeep's situation, she demands a phone swap with Yogi, but he flatly refuses. Her subsequent failed attempts to guess his password severely damage their mutual trust. Meanwhile, Nikitha reviews Pradeep's restored data, exposing his severe pornography addiction and a history of flirtatious texting with numerous girls, whom he routinely solicited for photos under the false pretense of offering acting auditions.

The situation escalates when Pradeep remembers a hidden Instagram account he and his friends created during their college years. The account utilized a fake female persona to exchange explicit messages and had previously targeted both Nikitha and her younger sister, Shwetha, though Pradeep did not use the account to message them. Terrified of legal consequences and total exposure, Pradeep schedules a restaurant meeting with Nikitha to secretly retrieve his device and deactivate the profile. Yogi accidentally overhears Pradeep's friends discussing the crisis and helpfully advises them that they can force-log out the account from another device using a mobile OTP. However, Revi intercepts the incoming OTP and maliciously exposes Pradeep's connection to the explicit account in front of Nikitha. A explosive argument ensues, and Nikitha breaks off the relationship. Pradeep physically assaults Revi in a fit of rage before being restrained by restaurant staff. During Divya’s wedding reception, a paranoid Pradeep falsely accuses and alienates his close friend Mani, believing him to be the one operating the account.

At the reception, the ongoing friction between Divya and Yogi peaks over his phone secrecy. Frustrated by his own ruined life, Pradeep tries to violently snatch Yogi's phone, but is stopped by Saraswathi. Breaking down in his mother's arms, Pradeep confesses the truth about his breakup. Saraswathi comforts him, explaining that absolute trust, rather than digital surveillance, is the true anchor of a relationship. Later that evening, Yogi privately confronts Pradeep and opens his phone, revealing that he hid it out of deep insecurity and shame regarding his weight, fearing Divya would call off the wedding if she saw the cruel cyberbullying messages he received from others. Overhearing this vulnerability, a moved Divya reconciles with Yogi, permanently abandoning her demand to see his device. Pradeep similarly swallows his pride and patches things up with Mani and his friends.

Shortly thereafter, a viral pornographic video surfaces online, appearing to feature Nikitha. Refusing to believe it is a fabrication, an enraged Venu physically assaults and disowns his daughter, forcing a heartbroken Nikitha to flee her home. When Pradeep learns of her disappearance, he and his friends launch a desperate search across Chennai but find no trace of her. Exhausted, Pradeep sits beneath a mango tree in his yard that he had planted as a young boy. He remembers how, as a child, he used to constantly dig up the seed to see if it was growing, until his mother told him to have faith and leave it alone.

Applying this lesson of patience and intuition, Pradeep accurately deduces Nikitha's favorite secluded beach and finds her sitting alone by the shore. He comforts her and reveals that his friends successfully tracked down the source of the video: Kaushik, a publicity-seeking colleague of Nikitha's who had engineered a malicious deepfake to gain internet fame. With Kaushik arrested by the cyber police, Pradeep and Nikitha finally reconcile. Venu arrives to apologize to his daughter for his lack of faith, revealing that the phone swap was ultimately a test to see if their love could survive the ugliest truths. With the conflict resolved, he gladly blesses their union. The story closes on the lesson that trust is the ultimate foundation of peace.

== Cast ==
- Pradeep Ranganathan as Uthaman Pradeep
  - Master Mahanth as young Pradeep
- Ivana as Nikitha Iyengar (Voice dubbed by Savitha Reddy)
- Raveena Ravi as Divya
- Yogi Babu as Dr. Yogi
- Sathyaraj as Venu Shastri Iyengar
- Radhika Sarathkumar as Saraswathi
- Akshaya Udayakumar as Shwetha Iyengar
- Prathana Nathan as Namitha
- Bharath as Mani
- Adithya Kathir as Bhaskar
- Aajeedh Khalique as Revi
- A. U. Navin Kirubhakar as Mamakutty
- Vijay Varadaraj as Kaushik
- Gurubaai as Nikitha's Instagram follower
- Azhaar Ateef as Kaushik's office friend
- Master Arav as Pultheesh
- Sandy (special appearance in the song "Saachitale")

== Production ==
=== Development ===
After the success of Comali (2019), Pradeep Ranganathan announced his next project which would be produced by Kalapathi S. Aghoram under the banner of AGS Entertainment under the tentative title as AGS 22. It was reported that the project would be an adaptation of Ranganathan's short film App(a) Lock. Later, the title was announced to be Love Today, which was taken from the 1997 film of the same name and would mark Pradeep's debut as an actor in a leading role. The makers unveiled the first look poster of the film on 4 July 2022.

=== Casting and filming ===
Ivana, who previously appeared in films like Naachiyaar (2018) and Hero (2019), was signed in to play the female lead, while Yogi Babu, who previously collaborated with the director in Comali, was signed on to play a supporting role. At the same time, Raveena Ravi and veteran actors Sathyaraj and Radhika Sarathkumar were also confirmed to be a part of this film. Principal photography began in December 2021. On 22 July 2022, it was announced that the entire shooting of the film was wrapped.

== Music ==
Love Today

Soundtrack album by Yuvan Shankar Raja
- Released: 8 November 2022
- Recorded: 2022
- Studio: U1 Records
- Genre: Feature film soundtrack
- Length: 17:52
- Language: Tamil
- Label: Sony Music
- Producer: Yuvan Shankar Raja

Yuvan Shankar Raja chronology
Naane Varuvean (2022)	Love Today (2022)	Coffee with Kadhal (2022)
External audio
- Audio Jukebox on YouTube

The music and original score are written by Yuvan Shankar Raja. The album includes a mix of romantic, fun, and emotional songs, with all lyrics penned by Pradeep Ranganathan. The music was successful, with several songs appearing in music charts.

=== Tamil ===
Track listing
No.	Title	Singer(s)	Length
1.	"Saachitale"	Yuvan Shankar Raja	3:59
2.	"Enai Vittu"	Sid Sriram	4:04
3.	"Pacha Elai"	Mathichiyam Bala	3:31
4.	"Ennai Vittu (Yuvan version)"	Yuvan Shankar Raja	3:52
5.	"Mamakutty"	Pradeep Ranganathan, Savitha Reddy, A.U. Navin Krubhakar	2:26
Total length:			17:52

=== Telugu ===
Track listing
No.	Title	Lyrics	Singer(s)	Length
1.	"Pilla Padesaave"	Bhaskarabhatla	Haricharan	3:57
2.	"Pranam Pothunna"	Kalyan Chakravarthy	Yuvan Shankar Raja	3:52
3.	"Bangu Aaku Thechi"	Kalyan Chakravarthy	Yogi Sekar	3:31
4.	"Bujjikanna"	Sasi Kumar Mutthuluri, Pradeep Ranganathan	D. Vasu, Savitha Reddy, G.N. Gokul	2:32
Total length:				13:52

== Release ==
=== Theatrical ===
Love Today was released theatrically on 4 November 2022. The distribution rights of the film in Tamil Nadu were acquired by Udhayanidhi Stalin under the banner of Red Giant Movies. The film was distributed and released in the UK by Ahimsa Entertainment. After the film's success, Dil Raju's Sri Venkateswara Creations presented the dubbed Telugu version, which was released on 25 November.

=== Home media ===
The post-theatrical streaming rights of the film were sold to Netflix, while the satellite rights were sold to Kalaignar TV. The film began streaming on Netflix from 2 December 2022 in Tamil Along with Dubbed Version In Telugu, Hindi, Malayalam and Kannada languages.

== Reception ==
=== Critical response ===
Love Today received positive reviews from critics.

Logesh Balachandran of The Times of India rated 3.5 out of 5 stars and wrote "Overall, Love Today is an entertaining watch and is a perfect outing for the weekend." Vishal Menon of Film Companion wrote, "by settling for instant gratification from its comedy rather than investigating in its broader, more meaningful themes, Love Today too settles for the ordinary." Vignesh Madhu of Cinema Express rated the film 3.5 out of 5 stars and wrote "It is a film about today's love, and Pradeep does a great job of ensuring that it's a story for everyone." Srivatsan S of The Hindu wrote "For a film that claims to be about modern-day relationships, you scratch your head thinking if there is anything modern. But you cannot complain — the 2K Kids are entertained." Soundarya Athimuthu of The Quint gave the film's rating 3 out of 5 and wrote "This new age romantic entertainer emphasizes the age-old fact that 'trust' is the foundation of a relationship." Kirubhakar Purushothaman of The Indian Express gave 3 out of 5 stars and wrote "The film conveniently deals only with softcore issues that are palatable for the mainstream audience... But what about their search history, their kinks, and the truths that only our mobile phones know? Maybe, those are too dark for this film, which wants to end on a rosy note." A critic for Cinema Vikatan wrote that in general, not only the lover, the beloved, but also the love changes its images and characteristics in all periods. Dinamalar rated the film 3.25 out of 5 stars. Akshay Kumar of DT Next gave 3.5 out of 5 gave the film's rating 3.5 out of 5 and wrote "Love Today is unique for its light treatment while not getting restricted to being called a 'timepass' film." Thinkal Menon of OTT Play gave 3.5 out of 5 stars and wrote "Director-actor Pradeep had mentioned in one of his movie promotions that the film has been made for 2K kids. It looks like he is completely aware of his target audience and has exactly served what they need."

=== Box office ===
On the first day of its release, the film collected over ₹6 crores worldwide. After three days of its release, the film grossed over ₹19 crore at the box office. On the 11th day of its release, the film grossed ₹50 crores worldwide.

The film is estimated to have grossed closer to ₹100 crore against a budget of ₹5 crore and became one of the highest grossing Tamil films of 2022.

== Remake ==
A Hindi-language remake, by the same producers titled Loveyapa, was released on 7 February 2025.
