= Oh My Kadavule =

2020 film directed by Ashwath Marimuthu

- Theatrical release poster
- Directed by: Ashwath Marimuthu
- Written by: Ashwath Marimuthu
- Produced by: G. Dilli Babu; Ashok Selvan; Abinaya Selvam
- Starring: Ashok Selvan; Ritika Singh; Vani Bhojan
- Cinematography: Vidhu Ayyanna
- Edited by: Boopathi Selvaraj
- Music by: Leon James
- Production companies: Axess Film Factory; Happy High Pictures
- Distributed by: Sakthi Film Factory
- Release date: 14 February 2020
- Running time: 153 minutes
- Country: India
- Language: Tamil

Oh My Kadavule (transl. Oh My God) is a 2020 Indian Tamil language romantic fantasy comedy film written and directed by Ashwath Marimuthu in his directorial debut. The film stars Ashok Selvan, Ritika Singh and Vani Bhojan as the leads while Shah Ra and M. S. Bhaskar play supporting roles. Vijay Sethupathi and Ramesh Thilak make extended cameo appearances. The film had its theatrical release on 14 February 2020, Valentine's Day to positive reviews from critics. Oh My Kadavule was selected for official screening at the International Indian Film Festival in Toronto, held in August 2020. It was remade in Kannada as Lucky Man (2022) and in Telugu as Ori Devuda (2022), with Ashwath directing the latter.

== Plot ==
Anu, Arjun and Mani have been friends since childhood. One day, Anu tells Arjun that her father has looked for a groom for her. She asks Arjun if he's willing to marry her. After a short drive home, Arjun says yes to Anu's proposal since he couldn't think of a reason to deny it.

They get married, but in a year, they are in family court asking for a divorce. Mani tries to talk Arjun out of the divorce, but Arjun is firm on his decision. A stranger tells Arjun of the events that's going to happen in the next 20 minutes and that he wouldn't get a divorce. Arjun scoffs him but is shocked to see them happen in real life. Anu faints just when she's about to provide her consent to the divorce and is taken to the hospital and the proceeding is postponed to the evening.

He goes to the place that was in the foretelling stranger's visiting card Love Court. He meets the man and his boss there. The boss claims he could get him the divorce and asks him to explain what led him to the decision. Arjun reveals the events after his marriage.

Arjun joins Anu's father's Ceramics company. He continues to see her as a friend, though she wishes to be treated with love. He also dislikes his job at her company. His school friend Meera visits the office for permission for a movie shoot and he agrees without discussing with Anu or her father. This leads to Anu yelling at him and their relationship continues to sour. Arjun shares his interest in acting to Meera and she asks him to audition under the director she's assisting. While thanking her for the opportunity, Meera opens up about her failures in personal and professional life. Anu sees them hugging and suspects him. In an outburst of anger, Arjun insults Anu's father's company for manufacturing mere toilets and suggests a divorce.

Hearing this, the boss reveals himself as God and grants him a second chance in life with a Golden ticket, with the condition that he can not reveal it to anyone or he'll die. Arjun restarts his life, saying no to Anu's proposal and pursuing his love for acting and Meera. He helps Meera in her decisions. Anu agrees to marry Matthew, the groom chosen by her father. Arjun finds out that Anu's father runs the company with a noble intention of building free toilets in his native village and regrets insulting his company.

He decides to profess his love to Meera by making a video of her favorite people in life, most of whom are in Kerala. Anu volunteers to come with him to Kerala, though her marriage is within a week. They go on a bike trip, and Arjun fully realises his love for Anu. He also meets Krishna, Meera's ex-boyfriend. He understands that Meera and Krishna had not moved on from each other.

Once he's back, he arranges for Meera and Krishna to meet and reconcile. On the day of Anu's wedding, he's heartbroken to see her on the altar with Matthew. However, Anu calls off the marriage and the three friends meet in their regular pub. She tells Arjun that she could feel his love for her. Arjun reveals to her that they were married, went until divorce and he hurt her deeply. This violates the condition of the Golden ticket and he dies in an accident.

He's back in the love court and pleads with them for another chance. God tells him he had died in the alternate life but he could still profess his love for Anu in his original life. In the family court, he apologizes to Anu and reveals his love to her and they reunite.

== Cast ==
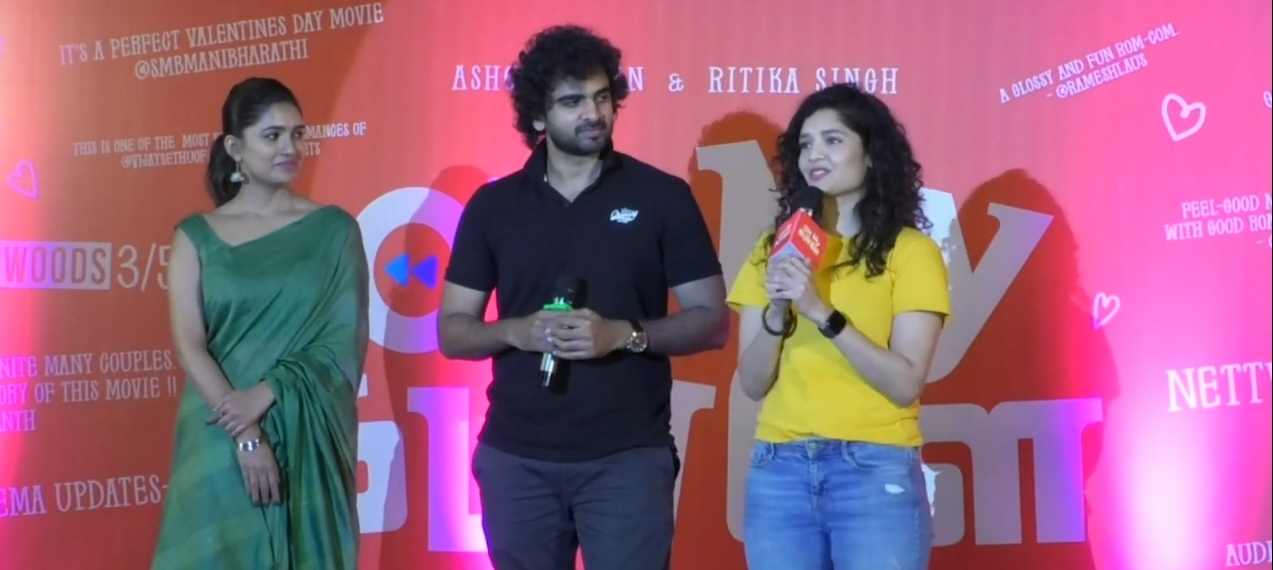
Vani Bhojan, Ashok Selvan and Ritika Singh promoting Oh My Kadavule.

- Ashok Selvan as Arjun Marimuthu
  - Jay Adithya as young Arjun
- Ritika Singh as Anu Arjun (née Paulraj, voiceover by M. M. Manasi)
  - Amrutha Dhivanand as young Anu
- Vani Bhojan as Meera
- Shah Ra as Mani, Anu and Arjun's childhood best friend
  - Master Jagannath as young Mani
- M. S. Bhaskar as Paulraj, Anu's father
- Vijay Sethupathi as Kadavul (Extended Cameo Appearance)
- Ramesh Thilak as Kadavul's assistant
- Gajaraj as Marimuthu, Arjun's father
- Sujatha Babu Ramesh as Arjun's mother
- Santhosh Prathap as Krishna, Meera's boyfriend, a boxer
- Abhishek Vinod as Mathew, Anu's ex-fiancé
- Aditi Dinesh as Swathi, Mani's wife
- Saranya as Krishna's sister
- Gautham Vasudev Menon as himself (Guest appearance)
- Seema as a Judge (Guest appearance)

== Production ==
The film is Ashwath Marimuthu's directorial debut. Vani Bhojan made her feature film acting debut through this project while Vijay Sethupathi was signed to play a cameo role. Filming wrapped in November 2019. In February 2020, Gautham Vasudev Menon was announced to be portraying a cameo role as himself. During the same month, the Telugu remake rights were acquired by PVP Cinema.

== Themes and influences ==
The plot aspect of what would happen if Arjun rejected Anu and showing two different outcomes of the same scenario was compared by several critics to It's a Wonderful Life (1946), Sliding Doors (1998) and its Indian remake 12B (2001).

== Soundtrack ==
The music was composed by Leon James, with the lyrics for the songs were written by Ko Sesha. The audio rights were secured by Sony Music India. The first single "Friendship Anthem" was released on 8 November 2019. The lyric video of the song features 1,000 photos of common people with their gang, accommodated in the song. In an interview with The Times of India, Ashwath Marimuthu shared his hope that the song would become popular as a friendship-themed song like "Mustafa" from Kadhal Desam (1996). The second single "Haiyo Haiyo" was released on 22 November 2019. The third single "Kadhaippoma" was released on 3 January 2020. The fourth single "Ennada Life Idhu" was released on 29 January 2020. The remaining two songs, were released along with the complete soundtrack album on 7 February 2020.

Sruthi Raman from The Times of India gave a positive review for the album, in which "Kadhaipoma" as a perfect meet-cute song, in which Sid Sriram injects his characteristic charm in the song, which brims with beautiful acoustics. Reviewing for "Friendship Anthem", Raman stated "the song paints a nice picture of a long-standing friendship. The crisp song is rendered by Anirudh with peppy notes. Also tracing the friendship along with Anirudh in the song are Leon and MM Manasi." For "Ennada Life Idhu", Raman stated the song as a bright number by Santhosh Narayanan and Leon, ruing the complexities of life. Raman also stated "Kadhal Kozhappudhey begins with sharp tunes of jazz and goes on to shine in Sanjeev T's voice, which stands out with its conversational lyrics." She also reviewed about Haiyo Haiyo song in which Leon's voice sounds crisper in its remastered version.

All lyrics are written by Ko Sesha.

Track listing
No.	Title	Singer(s)	Length
1.	"Haiyo Haiyo"	Leon James	3:29
2.	"Kadhaippoma"	Sid Sriram, Sinduri Vishal	4:42
3.	"Friendship Anthem"	Anirudh Ravichander, M. M. Manasi	3:52
4.	"Ennada Life Idhu"	Santhosh Narayanan	2:41
5.	"Kadhal Kozhappudhey"	Leon James, Sanjeev T	4:08
6.	"Haiyo Haiyo" (Remix)	Leon James	2:09

Background score

The original background score of the film was released on 26 February 2020. It features 30 original compositions from the film with two additional songs.

No.	Title	Lyrics	Singer(s)	Length
1.	"Marappadhilai Nenje" (Additional Song)	Ko Sesha	Leon James, Sudharshan Ashok	3:29
2.	"Dinamum Dinamum" (Additional Song)	Ko Sesha	Leon James	2:53
3.	"Are Marriages Made in Heaven"			1:10
4.	"Anu Enters Court"			0:38
5.	"Fantasy Strikes"			0:32
6.	"Unakku Sonna Puriyathu"			2:02
7.	"Love Court – The New World"			1:01
8.	"The First Night"			0:47
9.	"Toilet Quality Controller"			1:50
10.	"When Crush Comes Back"			1:28
11.	"Open Air Theater"			0:54
12.	"The Gautham Menon Audition"			3:28
13.	"Arjun Falls for Meera"			1:39
14.	"Meera or Anu"			0:54
15.	"Divorce"			0:54
16.	"Vijay Sethupathi God Theme"			1:52
17.	"Life Restarts Theme"			1:33
18.	"Haiyo Haiyo Flute Version"			2:09
19.	"Arjun, Anu & Mani"			1:15
20.	"A Father's Struggles"			2:54
21.	"The Friend's Reunite"			2:31
22.	"Marapadhillai Nenje Instrumental"			0:31
23.	"Anu Teases Arjun"			0:37
24.	"The Wedding Shopping"			2:04
25.	"Krishna the Boxer"			0:41
26.	"Kadhaippoma Reprise"			1:17
27.	"Friendship Than Sotthu"			0:24
28.	"Krishna Re-Enters Meera's Life"			2:13
29.	"Anu Leaves Church"			0:48
30.	"Final Confrontation with God"			0:44
31.	"Arjun Runs Back to Court"			0:49
32.	"Arjun Wins Anu in the Court"			2:07
Total length:				48:09

== Release ==
Oh My Kadavule was released on 14 February 2020, Valentine's Day. Prior to release, it received a U/A certificate from the Central Board of Film Certification after Ashwath refused to cut what he felt was "the most important shot in the film". The film's Tamil Nadu distribution rights were bought by Sakthi Film Factory. The film began streaming on ZEE5 from 24 April 2020.

== Critical reception ==
Srivatsan S of The Hindu wrote, "Oh My Kadavule (OMK) functions primarily on the romantic troupes; impulsive decisions, emotional meltdown, bad breakup followed by a road-trip in search of long lost soul. But where the movie becomes slightly better than ones with pretentious intentions is the quality to discount its own mishaps". M Suganth of The Times of India gave a rating of 3.5 out of 5, stating "Despite some conventional turns, Oh My Kadavule is a refreshing romance."

Janani K of India Today gave 3 out of 5 stars and stated, "Director Ashwath Marimuthu's debut film Oh My Kadavule is an endearing romantic comedy that gives treats its characters with utmost respect." S Subhakeerthana of The Indian Express gave 3 out of 5 stars to the film stating it "largely works because of the fantasy spin and the fun treatment to the subject matter—but the writing is problematic." Sify gave 3.5/5 to the film stating, "Though the treatment is breezy, Ashwath Marimuthu establishes an emotional bond with the audiences, all of us can relate to the proceedings and that's the biggest strength of the film"

== Remakes ==
The film was remade in Kannada as Lucky Man by Nagendra Prasad and in Telugu as Ori Devuda by Ashwath, both released in 2022.
