= Ashwath Marimuthu =

Indian film director and screenwriter

- Born: Tamil Nadu, India
- Education: SSN College of Engineering (BE)
- Occupations: Film director; screenwriter
- Years active: 2020–present

Ashwath Marimuthu is an Indian film director and screenwriter who works primarily in Tamil cinema. He made his directorial debut with the 2020 film Oh My Kadavule. His second Tamil film Dragon was released in 2025, and became the second highest-grossing Tamil film of the year.

== Career ==
Ashwath Marimuthu made his directorial debut with the Tamil film Oh My Kadavule in 2020. Starring Ashok Selvan and Rithika Singh, the film was praised for its fresh and innovative storyline. Following its success, Ashwath remade the film in Telugu as Ori Devuda.

In 2024, he announced his next film, Dragon, with director-actor Pradeep Ranganathan in the lead role. Ashwath and Pradeep share a close friendship that spans over a decade. Released in 2025, Dragon received widespread critical acclaim and briefly emerged the highest-grossing Tamil film of the year. In October 2024, Ashwath signed on his next feature film, which was to star Silambarasan. However, in June 2026 he began filming for Dharman.

== Filmmaking style ==
Ashwath Marimuthu has cited It's a Wonderful Life (1946) directed by Frank Capra as a major influence on his approach to storytelling. In a 2025 interview with The Hollywood Reporter India, he stated that he aims to incorporate the film’s uplifting and inspirational themes into his own work.

== Filmography ==
Year	Title	Role	Notes	Ref(s)
2020	Oh My Kadavule	—	Debut film	
2022	Ori Devuda	—	Telugu film; Remake of Oh My Kadavule	
2025	Dragon	Gowtham	Also cameo	
2027	Dharman †	—	Filming	

== Awards and recognition ==
List of awards received by Ashwath Marimuthu
Year	Award ceremony	Film	Category	Result
2021	20th Santosham Film Awards	Best Director – Tamil	Oh My Kadavule	Won
2021	9th South Indian International Movie Awards	Best Ddebut Director – Tamil	Oh My Kadavule	Nominated
2026	14th South Indian International Movie Awards	Best Director – Tamil	Dragon	Won
