= Dragon (2025 film) =

2025 Indian film by Ashwath Marimuthu

- Theatrical release poster
- Directed by: Ashwath Marimuthu
- Screenplay by: Ashwath Marimuthu
- Story by: Ashwath Marimuthu; Pradeep Ranganathan
- Produced by: Kalpathi S. Aghoram; Kalpathi S. Ganesh; Kalpathi S. Suresh
- Starring: Pradeep Ranganathan; Anupama Parameswaran; Kayadu Lohar
- Cinematography: Niketh Bommi
- Edited by: Pradeep E. Ragav
- Music by: Leon James
- Production company: AGS Entertainment
- Distributed by: see below
- Release date: 21 February 2025
- Running time: 155 minutes
- Country: India
- Language: Tamil
- Budget: ₹37 crore
- Box office: ₹150 crore

Dragon is a 2025 Indian Tamil-language coming-of-age comedy drama film directed by Ashwath Marimuthu, who co-wrote the story with Pradeep Ranganathan. Produced by AGS Entertainment, the film stars Pradeep in the titular role, alongside Anupama Parameswaran and Kayadu Lohar (in her Tamil debut). Mysskin, Gautham Vasudev Menon, K. S. Ravikumar and George Maryan appear in supporting roles. In the film, a college drop-out deceptively secures a high-paying job, but must genuinely work towards success when he is in danger of being exposed.

The film was officially announced in April 2024 under the tentative titles #AGS26 and #PradeepAshwathCombo, as it is AGS's 26th production and the first collaboration between Pradeep and Ashwath, and the official title was announced a few days later. Principal photography commenced the following month in Chennai and was nearly complete that October. The film has music composed by Leon James, cinematography handled by Niketh Bommi and editing by Pradeep E. Ragav.

Dragon was released worldwide on 21 February 2025 in standard and EPIQ formats. The film received positive reviews from critics, with particular praise towards the performances and engaging storyline. Earning over ₹150 crore (US$16 million), it briefly became one of the highest-grossing Tamil films of 2025.

== Plot ==
In 2014, D. Ragavan, a diligent 12th-standard student, wins a gold medal in computer science. Encouraged by his achievement, he confesses his feelings to his crush, Anjana, but she rejects him, preferring rebellious boys over well-mannered ones like him. Ragavan then transforms into a rebellious student, adopting the moniker "Dragon". With his friend Anbu, he builds a notorious reputation at AGS Engineering College in Vellore, accumulating 48 arrears. Despite his poor academics, he earns the respect of his peers.

During a college fest, Dragon gets into a fight and is suspended. Dean Mayilvahanan offers to revoke the suspension so he can redeem himself, but Dragon declines. After leaving college, he deceives his parents into believing he has an IT job, funding a small allowance through his friends and girlfriend, Keerthi. However, Keerthi ends their six-year relationship upon receiving a good marriage proposal, calling Dragon a failure due to his arrears and lack of independence. After a drunken accident, Dragon reassesses his life and sets a goal to earn a salary higher than what Keerthi's prospective groom Deepak earns.

Anbu and Dragon befriend Gowtham, a wealthy man who reveals he secured a job using a fake degree provided by an agency. Inspired, Dragon seeks one from the agency, whose managing director M. S. Rajesh asks ₹1,000,000 (US$10,000). Dragon manipulates his father, Dhanapal, into selling their land to raise funds. With the money, he obtains the degree and cheats in a video interview with Vale Kumar, the CEO of a multinational corporation. Dragon lands the job with an annual salary of ₹1,600,000 (US$17,000).

Dragon performs well at work due to his computer science background and earns multiple promotions within three years, securing a transfer to the United States. He buys a lavish villa and car, impressing businessman Parasuram, who arranges his daughter Pallavi's marriage with him. Dragon and Pallavi fall in love. However, Mayilvahanan spots Dragon in his car and confronts him. Forced to confess his forgery, Dragon begs Mayilvahanan to stay silent. He agrees, provided Dragon clears all arrears in a single attempt within three months. Fearing job loss and wedding cancellation, Dragon accepts. He secures a three-month work-from-home arrangement, lying to Vale about marriage commitments, and to his family about a training program in Mumbai.

Returning to college, Dragon struggles to adapt. Meanwhile, Kutty Dragon (transl. Little Dragon), a junior inspired by his notorious reputation, causes chaos. Dragon considers quitting but reconsiders after learning of Gowtham's arrest for his fake degree. Determined, he prepares for exams with help from Keerthi, now a lecturer. They reconcile as friends, with Keerthi expressing guilt over their past.

Before his final exam, Pallavi arrives in Mumbai to surprise him. To maintain his lie, Dragon says he came to Chennai to surprise her. She returns to Chennai, and Dragon rushes from Vellore to Chennai to meet her, then back to college. However, he struggles to write during the exam due to exhaustion and lack of sleep and goes to the washroom to refresh. Later when Vale initiates a background verification process on Dragon, the exam results are announced and Dragon is listed as having cleared his arrears, securing his job.

On his wedding eve, Dragon and Kutty Dragon visit their classmate Venkat, who attempted suicide after failing a subject. Venkat, who is poor, reveals that someone swapped their answer sheet with his, which cost his Google job offer. Dragon feels guilty; at the washroom, he had secretly called Rajesh to swap the answer sheets but did not anticipate Venkat as his target. The next day, overwhelmed with guilt, he stops his wedding and reveals the complete truth to Vale, Mayilvahanan, Pallavi and his family. He surrenders to the police and serves six months in prison while Venkat secures his job at Google.

Upon release, Dragon is accepted by his parents and starts working as a food delivery agent with a modest salary, while resuming his education with a correspondence course. Impressed by his reformation, Mayilvahanan offers his daughter Harini's hand in marriage. Initially hesitant, Dragon is smitten by Harini upon seeing her.

== Cast ==
- Pradeep Ranganathan as D. Ragavan "Dragon"
- Anupama Parameswaran as Keerthi
- Kayadu Lohar as Pallavi Parasuram (Voice dubbed by Savitha Radhakrishnan)
- Mysskin as S. Mayilvahanan
- Gautham Vasudev Menon as Vale Kumar
- K. S. Ravikumar as Parasuram
- George Maryan as Dhanapal
- Indumathy Manikandan as Chithra Dhanapal (Voice dubbed by Vinodhini Vaidyanathan)
- VJ Siddhu as Anbu
- Harshath Khan as Vetri "Kutty Dragon"
- Sneha as a doctor (cameo appearance)
- Gopika Ramesh as Anjana (cameo appearance)
- Anveshi Jain as Sherin (cameo appearance)
- P. L. Thenappan as Thenappan
- Bjorn Surrao as Mark
- Ravindhar Chandrasekaran as M. S. Rajesh
- Apollo Ravi as a college staff
- Joe Michael Praveen as Clerk in Matrimonial Office
- Whatsapp Mani as Paambu
- Ramesh Narayanan as Karups
- Lakshman Tekumudi as Bandi
- Rohith Muralidharan as Venkat
- Deepa Shankar as a maid
- Varshini Karmegam as Sirisha
- Sujatha Babu as Pallavi's mother
- Aruljothi Arockiaraj as Dragon's co-worker
- Ramjee as Purushothaman

Uncredited

- Ashwath Marimuthu as Gowtham
- Ivana as Harini, Mayilvahanan's daughter
- Kaushik Gabriell as Deepak

== Production ==
After the success of Oh My Kadavule in 2020, director Ashwath Marimuthu was congratulated by Silambarasan for the film's success, leading speculations that they would collaborate for the director's next directorial venture. Reports of a potential collaboration persisted through January 2022, with AGS Entertainment reported as the project's funder. Touted to be a romantic comedy, production was reportedly set to begin later that year. However, for unspecified reasons, the project was eventually delayed. Silambarasan moved on to Thug Life (2025), STR 49 directed by Ramkumar Balakrishnan and STR 50 directed by Desingh Periyasamy, while Ashwath took on the Telugu remake of Oh My Kadavule, later titled Ori Devuda (2022).

In December 2023, Pradeep Ranganathan, a long-time friend of Ashwath, was reported to collaborate with him for a potential film. AGS Entertainment was confirmed to be the project's funder, and made a public announcement on 10 April 2024, confirming the project, tentatively titled #PradeepAshwathCombo and #AGS26. The team retained collaborators from their previous films, including composer Leon James, editor Pradeep E. Ragav, and publicity designer Kabilan Chelliah; S. M. Venkat Manickam was appointed as the executive producer by the production house, while Niketh Bommi was chosen to handle the cinematography. Ashwath clarified the script he narrated to Silambarasan was not the same, after reports claimed it to be. The film's official title, Dragon, was announced on 5 May.

Pradeep would be playing a student as a main character for the first time. Anupama Parameswaran would be pairing opposite Pradeep, in her fourth Tamil film after Kodi (2016), Thalli Pogathey (2021) and Siren (2024). K. S. Ravikumar, Gautham Vasudev Menon and Mysskin were confirmed to be playing important roles, in their first collaboration with Pradeep and Ashwath. YouTubers VJ Siddhu and Harshath Khan would make their film acting sophomore after Nenjamundu Nermaiyundu Odu Raja (2019), while Kayadu Lohar would make her Tamil film debut with this film. Shortly thereafter, George Maryan and television actress Indumathy Manikandan were announced to play the title character's parents.

Principal photography began with first schedule on 5 May 2024 with an inaugural puja at a film city in Chennai on the day before. Several scenes were shot at the SSN College of Engineering, where Pradeep and Ashwath studied before. The fictional college in the film was modelled on the Vellore Institute of Technology. On 4 October, the director confirmed that filming had entered into its last schedule.

== Music ==
Leon James composed the musical score and soundtrack to Dragon in his first collaboration with Pradeep and third with Ashwath after Oh My Kadavule and Ori Devuda (2022). The album was preceded by three singles—"Rise of Dragon", "Vazhithunaiye" and "Yendi Vittu Pona"—before its release on 9 February 2025 under the Think Music label.

== Release ==
=== Marketing ===
The first trailer for Dragon led audiences to draw comparisons with the film and Don (2022), another Tamil film prominently set in a college, and featuring a reckless protagonist. Ashwath denounced the comparisons, acknowledging that while Dragon may be similar to Don with regards to their college setting and "vibrant visuals", the storyline was completely different.

=== Theatrical ===
Dragon was initially scheduled to be released theatrically on 14 February 2025, but was postponed to avoid a box-office clash with Vidaamuyarchi. It was released on 21 February 2025 in standard and EPIQ formats, clashing with Nilavuku En Mel Ennadi Kobam. Apart from the original Tamil language, it was also released in a dubbed Telugu version under the title Return of the Dragon due to the original title Dragon already being registered for another Telugu film.

The film was certified U/A (13+) by the Central Board of Film Certification (CBFC). In the United Kingdom, the film was released on the same day, however, in a version that was certified 12A by the British Board of Film Classification (BBFC) for moderate violence, brief suicide references, domestic abuse and injury detail, following a cut of 1 minute and 50 seconds.

=== Distribution ===
Mythri Movie Makers acquired the distribution rights of the film for Nizam and Ceded Area, while Poorvi Pictures bought the rights for Coastal Andhra. The distribution rights for North India were acquired by AA Films, and Karnataka by Oveum International. Phars Films acquired the overseas distribution rights for the Middle East, United Kingdom, Europe, United States, Canada and Dubai, while United India Exporters bought the overseas distribution rights for Malaysia, Singapore, Australia and Sri Lanka. In Tamil Nadu, the film was distributed by AGS themselves.

=== Home media ===
The film's post-theatrical streaming rights were acquired by Netflix, where it began streaming from 21 March 2025.

== Reception ==
=== Critical response ===
Dragon received widespread critical acclaim, who praised the performances and engaging storyline.

Harshini SV of The Times of India gave 4/5 stars and wrote "'Ashwath Marimuthu's second outing is also a fun, emotional, and fully charged ride." Kirubhakar Purushothaman of News18 gave 4/5 stars and wrote " The genius of Ashwath's writing is its thought-out screenplay structure. It raises despite its predictability. You see the conflict coming from a mile away. It is apparent Dragon will get caught; you know the next plot point is right around the corner, and you can feel the redemption arc in the air. Dragon delivers exactly all that, but in ways you didn't know were possible." Avinash Ramachandran of The Indian Express gave 3.5/5 stars and wrote "With a terrific Pradeep Ranganathan in the lead, director Ashwath Marimuthu and his team have delivered a heavily preachy yet immensely entertaining film that knows its audience."

Ganesh Aaglave of Firstpost gave 3.5/5 stars and wrote "On the whole, Dragon is a full-on entertainer with a good social message, which makes an impact without being preachy." Anusha Sundar of OTTPlay gave 3/5 stars and wrote "Dragon warrants for a theatre watch. There is enough and more for the audience of today's age to get entertained and schooled at the same time. [...] Dragon becomes a film on how redemption works." Janani K of India Today gave 3/5 stars and wrote "Dragon is a satisfying watch with minor shortcomings. Despite convenient writing, the screenplay keeps the story going with some interesting twists and turns."

Bhuvanesh Chandar of The Hindu wrote "Ragavan's story is a modern take, an antidote, to the countless Tamil college dramas with heroes proclaiming the swag with which young men should carry themselves." Latha Srinivasan of Hindustan Times wrote "Dragon is a film that is fun and entertaining with an underlying social message that is important at this point in time. Money is important but is money everything in life? Director Ashwath Marimuthu and Pradeep Ranganathan have aced this outing."

=== Box office ===
As of 14 March 2025, Dragon had grossed over ₹130 crore (US$13 million) worldwide, surpassing Vidaamuyarchi's lifetime collections, to become the highest-grossing Tamil film of 2025. The film ended its theatrical run with approximately ₹150 crore (US$16 million) as of 4 April 2025. Later that month, it was dethroned by the ₹152 crore (US$16 million) gross of Good Bad Ugly.

== Accolades ==
Dragon won in four categories under the Tamil branch at the 14th South Indian International Movie Awards: Best Film, Best Actor (Pradeep), Best Director (Ashwath) and Best Debut Actress (Lohar).

== Impact ==
In April 2025, a Telangana-based engineer cheated his way into securing employment at Infosys, although his deception was discovered within two weeks of his joining, which the media compared to the plot of Dragon.
