= Pradeep Ranganathan =

Indian film director and actor (born 1993)

- Born: 25 July 1993 (age 33); Chennai, Tamil Nadu, India
- Education: SSN College of Engineering, Chennai, Tamil Nadu
- Occupations: Film director; Actor; Screenwriter; Playback singer; Lyricist; Producer
- Years active: 2019–present
- Father: Ranganathan

Pradeep Ranganathan (born 25 July 1993) is an Indian actor, film director, lyricist, producer, singer and screenwriter who works in Tamil cinema. He is known for directing Comali (2019) and Love Today (2022), debuting as a lead actor in the latter. He is an recipient of two Tamil Nadu State Film Awards and one Filmfare Award South.

== Early life ==
Pradeep studied at SSN College of Engineering. He began his career by making several short films, including Whatsapp Kadhal (2014) and used to multitask by doing acting, editing and directing.

== Career ==
Pradeep received his first feature film directorial debut opportunity from Ravi Mohan and Vels International, who were impressed after watching some of his short films. The film's title, which was revealed to be Comali (2019), also starred Kajal Aggarwal and the film became a commercial success at the box office. Pradeep also eventually made a cameo appearance during the climax portion of Comali. However, Pradeep was the subject of controversy before the theatrical release of Comali as Rajinikanth's fans demanded the film to be boycotted due to the depiction of the flashback of Rajinikanth where he promised to enter politics in 1996 being mentioned in a portion of the film trailer. It was also a major talking point and highlight in the trailer of the film. The scene was subsequently removed from the film following the backlash.

Pradeep's second directorial venture, Love Today (2022), was based on his short film App(a) Lock and was a modest small budgeted theatrical release in Tamil Nadu. However, upon release, it became an instant blockbuster and surpassed expectations. Pradeep rose to prominence and became an overnight sensation with Love Today. He also made his full-fledged acting debut with the film, playing one of the leads. He later revealed that the film reflects and relates to everyone, as everyone would have faced these situations in their life. The film became a major box office success, grossing over ₹100 crore (US$11 million) as did his next two feature films Dragon and Dude (both 2025). However, his 2026 release Love Insurance Kompany was a box office failure, breaking his success streak. On 6 July, Pradeep launched his own production house, PR Show.

== Filmography ==
Key
†	Denotes films that have not yet been released

=== As actor ===
Year	Title	Role	Notes	Ref.
2019	Comali	Joseph	Cameo appearance	
2022	Love Today	Uthaman Pradeep		
2025	Dragon	D. Ragavan "Dragon"		
2025	Dude	Agan Chidambaram		
2026	Love Insurance Kompany	"Vibe Vassey" Vasudevan		
2026	Idhayam Murali	"Auto Driver"	Cameo Appearance	

=== As director, writer and producer ===
Key
†	Denotes films that have not yet been released

Year	Title	Credited as	Notes	Ref.
2019	LKG	Dialogue writer	Additional dialogues only	
2019	Comali	Director and writer	Lyricist for "Paisa Note" and "Hi Sonna Pothum"	
2022	Love Today	Director and writer	Lyricist for all songs	
2025	Loveyapa	Producer	Hindi film; Remake of Tamil film Love Today	
2025	Dragon	Story writer		
TBA	#PRS01 †	Producer and writer		

== Discography ==
List of Pradeep Ranganathan playback singer credits
Year	Film	Song	Language	Composer	Notes
2022	Love Today	"Mamakutty"	Tamil	Yuvan Shankar Raja	
2025	Dude	"Singari"	Tamil	Sai Abhyankkar	

== Awards and nominations ==
Award	Year	Category	Work	Result	Ref.
Filmfare Awards South	2024	Best Male Debut	Love Today	Won	
South Indian International Movie Awards	2021	Best Debut Director – Tamil	Comali	Won	
South Indian International Movie Awards	2023	Best Male Debut – Tamil	Love Today	Won	
Tamil Nadu State Film Awards	2019	Best Film - Third Prize	Comali	Won	
Tamil Nadu State Film Awards	2022	Best Writer - Story	Love Today	Won	
Ananda Vikatan Cinema Awards	2025	Best Actor - Tamil	Dude	Won	
South Indian International Movie Awards	2025	Critics Choice Awards Best Actor - Tamil	Dragon	Won	
