= Elred Kumar =

Indian film producer

- Born: Elred Kumar Santhanam; Thangachimadam, Tamil Nadu, India
- Citizenship: India
- Education: College of Engineering, Guindy (Post-Graduate)
- Occupations: Film director, Film producer
- Years active: 2010–present
- Organization: RS Infotainment
- Father: P. S. Santhanam Gomez

Elred Kumar Santhanam is an Indian film director, screenwriter and film producer best known for his work on Ko, Muppozhudhum Un Karpanaigal, and Vinnaithaandi Varuvaayaa. His films were made under his production house, RS Infotainment.

== Career ==
=== 2009-2012: Breakthrough in the Tamil film industry ===
Kumar was born in the village of Thangachimadam. He completed a post-graduate degree in engineering at the College of Engineering, Guindy. Elred Kumar was first announced as "a businessman passionate about the film industry" in an article by the Economic Times in 2009, and it was announced that he would collaborate with his business partner R. Jayaraman as a part of RS Infotainment to be the producers of Gautham Vasudev Menon's Vinnaithaandi Varuvaayaa (2010) alongside VTV Ganesh and Escape Artists Motion Pictures' Madan. The romantic coming-of-age story featured Silambarasan and Trisha Krishnan in the lead roles, while A. R. Rahman composed the film's score and soundtrack. Upon release, it achieved positive reviews, with several critics giving "modern classic" status, whilst also becoming a commercially successful venture. His next venture, Ko (2011) directed by K. V. Anand and starring Jiiva, Karthika Nair and Piaa Bajpai, also opened to positive reviews. The Hindu described the film as a "tale with a realistic twist" and praised the film's production values. Elred Kumar was also involved in the co-production of the films Nadunisi Naaygal (2011) and Veppam (2011) alongside Jayaraman, Madan, Venkat and Gautham Menon.

Elred Kumar's scripted his next production Muppozhudhum Un Karpanaigal (2012), starring Adharvaa Murali and Amala Paul, with Ganesh Vinayak signed on as director. The film was to be shot across India and the US at a budget of 200 million. However, in March 2011, the director was ousted and Elred took over responsibilities as director of the project. The film opened to mixed reviews, with Kumar's performance as director being heavily scrutinised. A critic from IBN noted "Sadly, Kumar, while focusing on such things, seems to have lost the grip on the script, which lacks logic or coherence", concluding that "the director has got many things wrong". In comparison, Sify.com noted that Elred "makes a confident debut with a film that maintains its suspense till the end." The film fared averagely at the box office, and Elred contemplated releasing a second version of the film with a different screenplay. He took the film to the 2012 Cannes Film Festival, where it was screened twice in the various film screenings in the city during the festival. His first Hindi film production, Ekk Deewana Tha (2012), a remake of his previous venture with Gautham Menon, also released on the same weekend as Muppozhudhum Un Karpanaigal. However the film opened to mixed reviews and took a lukewarm opening at the box office, resulting in financial failure.

=== 2012-present: Mixed success and litigation ===
He then went on to co-produce Menon's next Neethaane En Ponvasantham (2012), another romantic drama film featuring Jiiva and Samantha. The film opened in December 2012 to good reviews but only fared averagely at the box office. In February 2013, Elred filed a legal case against Gautham Menon and Madan claiming that he had entered into an agreement to do a film starring Silambarasan with music by A. R. Rahman in November 2008, during the making of Vinnaithaandi Varuvaayaa. He noted that they had agreed again in February 2010 to make the film, but now with Allu Arjun in the lead role. However, Elred claimed that both Gautham and Madan had gone on to do other projects even though they had been paid an advance of 40 million. Madan swiftly denied any involvement citing he had split from the other co-producers after the success of Vinnaithaandi Varuvaayaa. Gautham Menon responded with an emotionally charged letter, revealing that Elred was harassing him and putting his career in trouble. He noted that Silambarasan was the main choice for Neethaane En Ponvasantham, and the film that Elred had alluded to was that particular venture. He went further in claiming that Elred had been undiplomatic in his conduct following the relative failure of the film, while the producer had also made derogatory remarks regarding the selection of Ilaiyaraaja in the project. Elred replied by changing his argument – claiming that the four crores were used by Menon to buy a house after a proposed London schedule for the film was cancelled. Gautham once again subsequently reacted to the media by clarifying the situation regarding the payment, his house and the choice of cast and crew of the film.

Elred Kumar then produced Yaamirukka Bayamey (2014), a horror comedy directed by newcomer Deekay, with an ensemble cast featuring Kreshna, Karunakaran, Rupa Manjari, Oviya and Anaswara Kumar. The film opened to positive reviews and became a commercial success, prompting remakes in several other languages. The Hindu called the film "a surprisingly well-made 'horror-comedy' that succeeds in continuously exploiting our irrational fear of the unknown even while nudging us to laugh at it...this is a fun summer film and should work regardless of whether one believes in the supernatural or not". Likewise Sify wrote, "Yaamirukka Bayamey is something different within the commercial format and provides potent dose of laughs to release the tension built up by the scares", and praised Elred's introduction of director Deekay. However, Elred Kumar's next film, Yaan (2014) starring Jiiva and Thulasi Nair, which marked the debut of cinematographer Ravi K. Chandran as a director, became a large commercial failure at the box office. The film, which was made on a lavish budget over a period of two years, was heavily criticised upon release. Baradwaj Rangan from The Hindu wrote, "Yaan, is a major disappointment", while The Times of India gave 2 out of 5 for the film and wrote, "despite all the colours on screen, this is such a dull, flavourless film, let down by the writing, which is preposterous and uninspiring". After release, Elred Kumar heavily criticised Chandran and threatened to file legal action after it was reported that the film was plagiarised from Midnight Express (1978).

He then planned to make multiple films in nominal budget and planned film with Bobby Simha in the lead, which was Ko 2, directed by Sarath Mandava. Veera and Deekay's second film, Kavalai Vendam, all three films got a decent opening with profit venture in the overall revenue. He has planned a Pan-Indian project with National Award-winning director Mr.Vetrimaaran, which is now in its pre-production stage.

== Filmography ==
=== As director ===
Year	Film	Notes
2012	Muppozhudhum Un Karpanaigal	

=== As screenwriter ===
Year	Film	Notes
2012	Muppozhudhum Un Karpanaigal	
2026	Mandaadi	Screenplay only
