= RS Infotainment =

Indian film production and distribution company

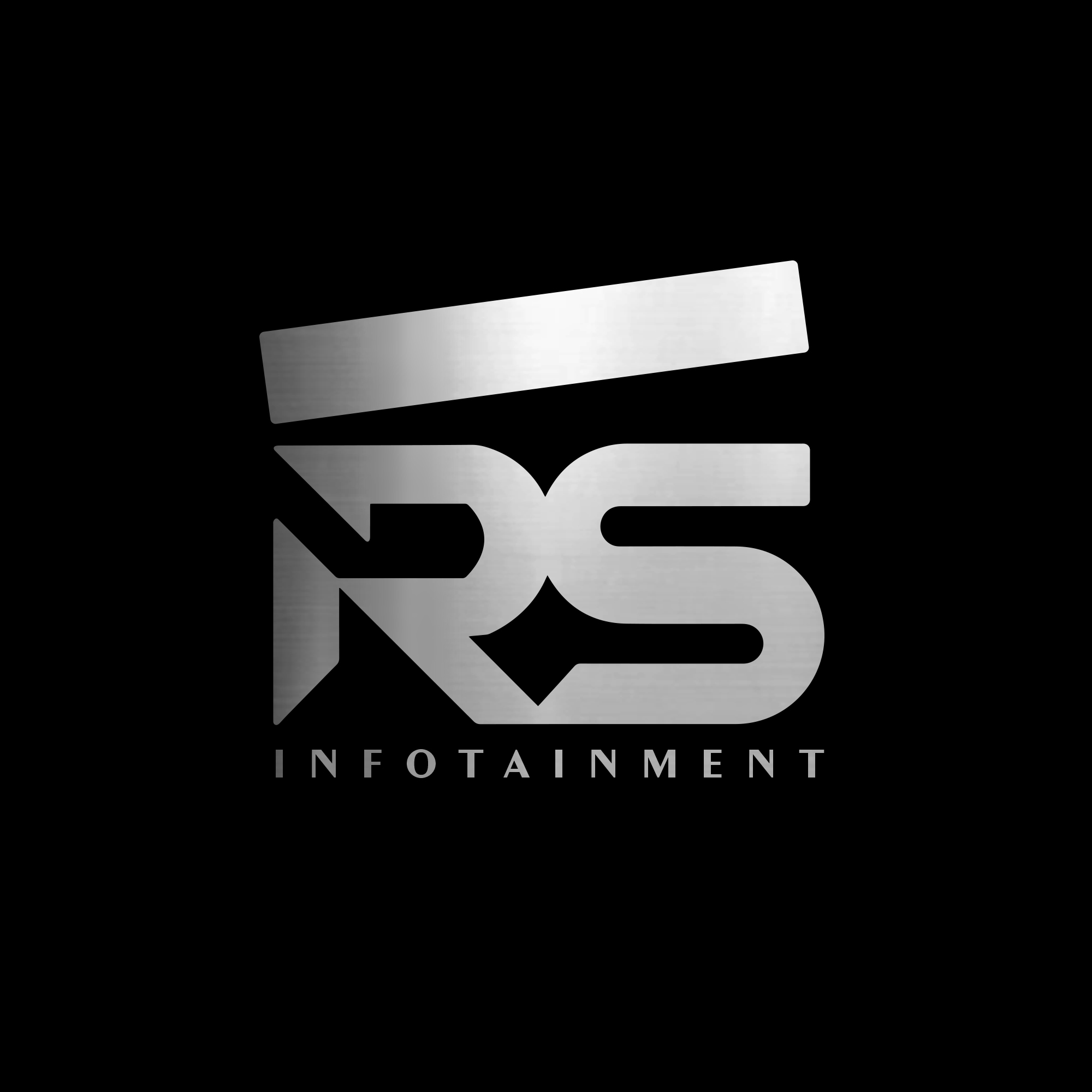
- Type: Film production Film distribution
- Industry: Entertainment
- Founded: 2008
- Headquarters: Chennai, India
- Key people: Elred Kumar
- Products: Motion pictures (Tamil)

RS Infotainment is an Indian film production and distribution company headed by Elred Kumar. The studio has produced films made in Tamil, Telugu, Kannada and Hindi.

== History ==
Elred Kumar was first announced as "a businessman passionate about the film industry" in an article by the Economic Times in 2009, RS Infotainment are the producers of Gautham Vasudev Menon's Vinnaithaandi Varuvaayaa (2010) alongside VTV Ganesh and Escape Artists Motion Pictures' Madan.

After having enjoyed success with their initial ventures such as Vinnaithaandi Varuvaayaa (2010), Ko (2011) and Yaamirukka Bayamey (2014), their recent ventures have been less profitable.

== Filmography ==
Year	Title	Director	Cast	Ref.
2010	Vinnaithaandi Varuvaayaa	Gautham Vasudev Menon	Silambarasan, Trisha	
2011	Nadunisi Naaygal	Gautham Vasudev Menon	Veera, Sameera Reddy	
2011	Ko	K. V. Anand	Jiiva, Ajmal, Piaa Bajpai, Karthika Nair	
2011	Veppam	Anjana Ali Khan	Nani, Karthik Kumar, Nithya Menen, Bindu Madhavi	
2012	Ekk Deewana Tha	Gautham Vasudev Menon	Prateik Babbar, Amy Jackson	
2012	Muppozhudhum Un Karpanaigal	Elred Kumar	Atharvaa, Amala Paul	
2012	Neethaane En Ponvasantham	Gautham Vasudev Menon	Jiiva, Samantha	
2014	Yaamirukka Bayamey	Deekay	Kreshna, Rupa Manjari, Oviya, Karunakaran	
2014	Namo Bhootatma	Murali	Komal, Iswarya Menon, Harish Raj, Gayathri Iyer	
2014	Yaan	Ravi K. Chandran	Jiiva, Thulasi Nair	
2016	Ko 2	Sarath Mandava	Bobby Simha, Nikki Galrani	
2016	Kavalai Vendam	Deekay	Jiiva, Kajal Aggarwal, Sunaina, Bobby Simha	
2018	Veera	Rajaraman	Kreshna, Iswarya Menon, Karunakaran	
2023	Viduthalai Part 1	Vetrimaaran	Soori, Vijay Sethupathi	
2024	Viduthalai Part 2	Vetrimaaran	Soori, Vijay Sethupathi	
2026	Mandaadi	Mathimaran Pugazhendhi	Soori, Suhas, Mahima Nambiar	
