= Ko (film) =

2011 film by K. V. Anand

- Theatrical release poster
- Directed by: K. V. Anand
- Written by: K. V. Anand; Subha
- Produced by: Elred Kumar
- Starring: Jiiva; Ajmal Ameer; Karthika Nair; Piaa Bajpai
- Cinematography: Richard M. Nathan
- Edited by: Anthony
- Music by: Harris Jayaraj
- Production company: RS Infotainment
- Distributed by: Red Giant Movies
- Release date: 22 April 2011
- Running time: 165 minutes
- Country: India
- Language: Tamil
- Budget: ₹14 crore

Ko (transl. King) is a 2011 Indian Tamil-language political action thriller film directed by K. V. Anand, and written by him and the writing duo Subha. The film stars Jiiva, Ajmal Ameer, Karthika Nair (in her Tamil debut), and Piaa Bajpai, while Prakash Raj, Kota Srinivasa Rao and Bose Venkat appear in supporting roles. It follows a photojournalist who, while covering the Tamil Nadu State Election, uncovers a conspiracy involving Naxalites.

Anand wrote the script based on his early experiences as a freelance photojournalist. The film began production in early 2010 and continued through that December; filming was predominantly held in Chennai, as well as other parts of Tamil Nadu, Puducherry, Karnataka and Andhra Pradesh, with song sequences being shot in China and Norway. The film features music composed by Harris Jayaraj, with cinematography by Richard M. Nathan and editing by Anthony.

Ko was released on 22 April 2011 and became a commercial success, winning two Filmfare Awards South, three Vijay Awards, two SIIMA Awards, and four Tamil Nadu State Film Awards. It was remade in Bengali as Kanamachi (2013). A standalone sequel titled Ko 2 was released in 2016, with Prakash Raj reprising his role.

== Plot ==
Ashwin Kumar, a photojournalist working for the private newspaper Dina Anjal, witnesses Naxalites robbing a bank and manages to photograph them. When he tries to escape, he is stopped by Renuka "Renu", who assumes he is the culprit and helps the robbers take his camera. Having secured the camera's memory card, he shows the police the photographs. The police identify everyone except the gang leader, who is wearing a mask. At his office, Ashwin again meets Renu, who has newly joined as an article editor. He slowly falls in love with her. Another employee, Saraswathi "Saro", also has feelings for Ashwin, who does not reciprocate.

Settled in her new job, Renu writes a cover story about a politician Aalavandhan, describing his attempt to marry a minor. Enraged, Aalavandhan barges into the newspaper office and berates Renu. The audio recording of her interview disappears (courtesy of Aalavandhan), and she is fired for falsified reporting. At midnight, Ashwin discreetly photographs Aalavandhan actually engaging in child marriage. The story with the photographs is printed, and Renu reciprocates Ashwin's love. Meanwhile, Vasanthan Perumal, an engineer and recent graduate, strives hard to enter politics by contesting the upcoming election. He is contesting against more experienced politicians who bribe voters with freebies and money.

Nobody cares about Vasanthan and Siragugal, his team of graduates, who promise people a healthy government. Ashwin and Renu learn about Vasanthan's election campaign, and they and the entire Dina Anjal team extend their support to the campaign, covering it extensively, much to the chagrin of Aalavandhan and the Chief Minister (CM) Yogeswaran. One night, Siragugal organises a campaign meeting. While photographing the event, Ashwin receives a text from Saro that a bomb is under the stage where Vasanthan is speaking. Ashwin saves Vasanthan just before the bomb explodes. Later, Ashwin finds Saro mortally wounded near the blast site. Saro struggles to tell something to Ashwin and Renu before dying. Ashwin, through a video clip recorded by another photographer, discovers that Saro was intentionally killed. He later notices a resemblance between the Naxalite bank robbery leader and the unknown killer.

A few days later, Renu notices that Vasanthan's photograph in their newspaper was cut from a college class photograph, where Ashwin is also present. Confronted by Renu, Ashwin reveals that Vasanthan is his former college mate and best friend and that he wholeheartedly supports Vasanthan's campaign. Vasanthan's party wins the election, and Vasanthan becomes the CM. He orders the release of 20 Naxalites on Republic Day, citing humanity. Shocked on hearing this news, Ashwin rushes to the secretariat to meet Vasanthan. In Vasanthan's office, Ashwin notices that the Naxalite leader who killed Saro is there, talking with Vasanthan. Ashwin airs his grievances to Vasanthan, who ignores him. Ashwin follows the leader to his hideout.

At the same time, Vasanthan orders the police to kill the Naxalites at their hideout, and the commandos surround the perimeter of that place. Ashwin, already at the hideout, confronts the Naxalite leader, Kadhir, and learns from him that Vasanthan made a deal with the Naxalites to help him win the election. They orchestrated events to win people's sympathy. In the same vein, they had planted the bomb. Saro had uncovered the truth about Vasanthan but was fatally assaulted by him before she could reveal his intentions to anyone. Ashwin realises that Saro tried to warn him and Renu about Vasanthan's true character before dying and that Vasanthan is double-crossing the Naxalites and planning to kill them as a show of achievement.

Ashwin records the confession and sends it to Renu, who plans to publish this story. Vasanthan then arrives and kills Kadhir. He tries to kill Ashwin, who kills him using a landmine. Realising that Vasanthan's party members are innocent, Ashwin persuades Renu not to expose Vasanthan because his party members would suffer for naïvely supporting him. Renu instead publishes a false article saying that Vasanthan sacrificed himself fighting the Naxalites. Ashwin and Renu submit their resignations to their editor, S. Krishnakumar "Krish", after telling him the truth about Vasanthan. Krish, however, decides to preserve Vasanthan's reputation and rejects their resignations.

== Cast ==
- Jiiva as Ashwin Kumar
- Ajmal Ameer as D. Vasanthan Perumal
- Karthika Nair as Renuka "Renu" Narayanan
- Piaa Bajpai as Saraswathi "Saro" Sarangan
- Prakash Raj as Chief Minister Yogeswaran "Yogi"
- Kota Srinivasa Rao as Aalavandhan
- Bose Venkat as Kadhir
- Jagan as Chandru
- Achyuth Kumar as S. Krishnakumar "Krish"
- Vanitha Krishnachandran as Ashwin's mother
- Pattimandram Raja as Jayaraman, Ashwin's father
- Mani M. Mani as Ashwin, Renu, and Saro's manager
- Sona Heiden as Sumitha Kothari
- Kaajal Pasupathi as Rudra
- Anuja Iyer as Manjushree (cameo appearance)
- Kadhal Kannan as Prakash
- Rail Ravi as Aalavandhan's assistant
- Rajaj as a Dina Anjal employee
- Balaji as Kailash
- Rekha Suresh as the wife of Aalavandhan's follower
- D. Suresh as Suresh
- Charanraj as a PA to a politician who works under Yogeswaran
- Imman Annachi as Aalavandhan's sidekick
- Bayilvan Ranganathan as himself
- Rajasimman as Aalavandhan's assistant
- Anthony as TV editor (uncredited)
- D. R. K. Kiran as a Siragugal member (uncredited)

Cameo appearances as themselves in the song "Aga Naga" (Note: credited as Special Thanks)

- Suriya
- Tamannaah Bhatia
- Ravi Mohan
- Jai
- Karthi
- Shiva
- Abbas
- Ganesh Venkatraman
- M. Sasikumar
- Atharvaa
- R. Kannan
- Anjali
- Bharath
- Krish
- Shakthi Vasudevan
- Rima Kallingal
- Narain
- John Vijay
- Gadam Kishan
- Harris Jayaraj (uncredited)
- Sanjana Singh (uncredited)
- Peter Hein (uncredited)
- Madhan Karky (uncredited)

== Production ==
=== Development ===
After the success of Ayan (2009), the director K. V. Anand had begun working on a story idea based on his early life as a freelance photojournalist before transitioning to films. Having worked on magazines such as Kalki, India Today, Illustrated Weekly and other publications, as a photo editor, Anand felt that a newspaper scenario was something new to him. This resulted in him visiting the headquarters of the Deccan Herald newspaper office in Bengaluru and interact with editors, sub-editors, photojournalists and editors to know about their working style and pattern. Afterwards, he collaborated with the duo Subha for writing the script which took them six months.

The film was initially announced with AGS Entertainment as the producers, but the company backed out and the film was eventually produced by Elred Kumar's RS Infotainment. Music composer Harris Jayaraj, cinematographer Richard M. Nathan, editor Anthony, art director D. R. K. Kiran and action choreographer Peter Hein were involved as a part of the technical crew. The film's title Ko was derived from an ancient Tamil word which means "king".

=== Casting ===
Anand initially thought of casting Ajith Kumar or Karthi in the lead role. He eventually approached Silambarasan, and the actor accepted after being impressed with Anand's script. Karthika Nair was cast as the lead actress, in her Tamil debut, as Anand wanted "an actress who looks like an ordinary journalist and not a sex bomb" and he chose her after being impressed with her performance in the Telugu film Josh (2009). However, Silambarasan opted out of the film, despite having shot a few scenes and done a photoshoot, reportedly owing to differences of opinion with the director; partly due to him being unconvinced on Karthika's casting and requested Anand to replace her with Tamannaah Bhatia, which the producers declined as Bhatia had charged a hefty salary.

Anand then narrated the script to Jiiva, who eventually agreed to be a part of the film. Upon his casting, Anand attributed this to his versatile performances, even with his sophomore Raam (2005) adding, "He is one of the most talented young actors in Tamil, a dark horse, I would say. He can do comedy in a film like SMS and also serious roles like Katrathu Thamizh; a real versatile actor. He is a very simple person also." Piaa Bajpai accepted to play Saro, and believed people would accept her character rather than focusing on her looks or costumes. Ajmal Ameer was cast as the student leader Vasanthan after Anand was impressed with his performances in Anjathe (2008) and Thiru Thiru Thuru Thuru (2009); he is secretly the main antagonist. Anand approached Dravidian ideologue Suba Veerapandian for portraying an undisclosed role, but the latter declined after showing initial interest. Prakash Raj was cast as the chief minister, and Anand sought to make this character more practical and morally ethical than Vasanthan.

=== Filming ===
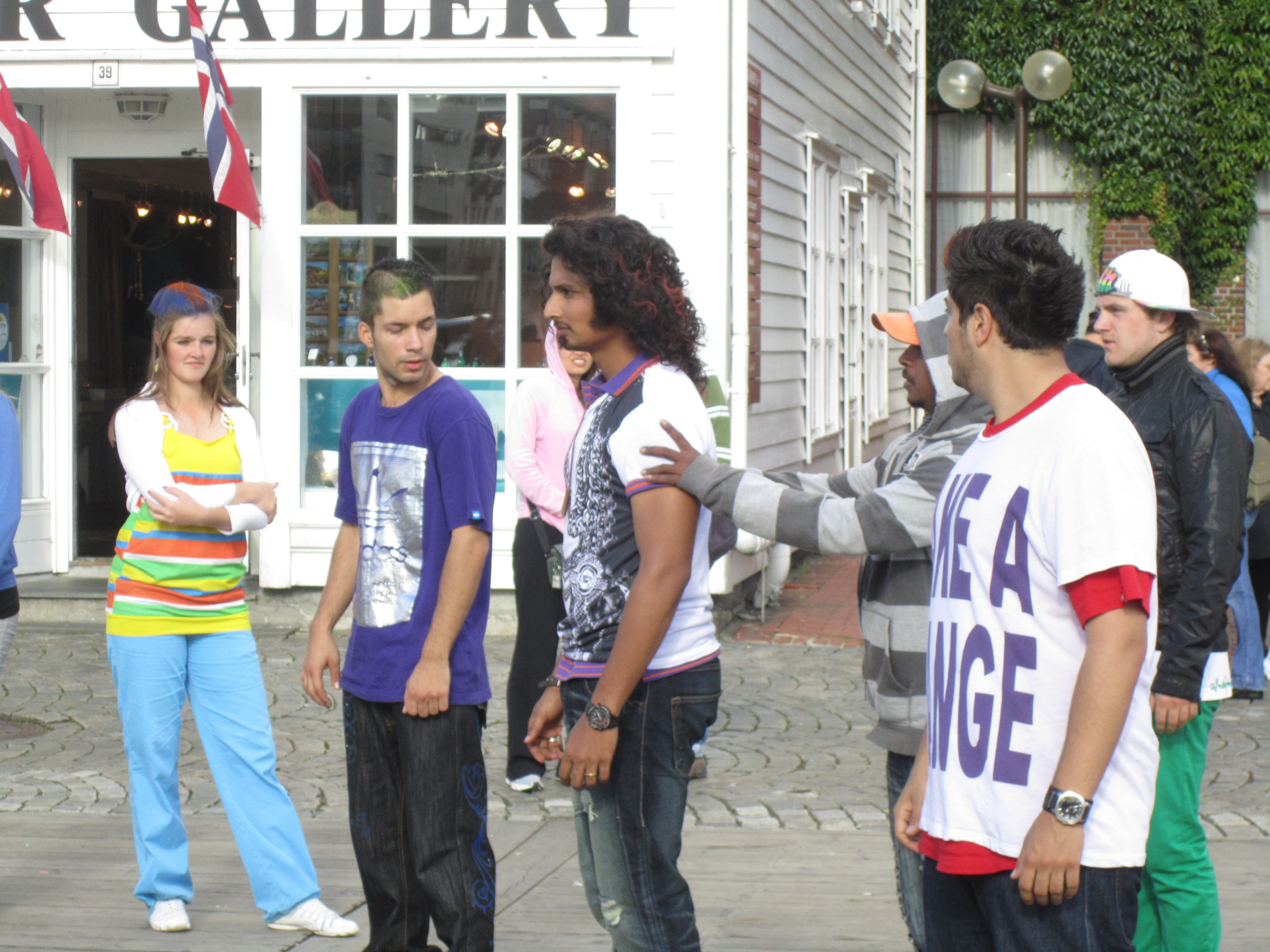
Jiiva during the filming of Ko at Bergen

Ko was filmed predominantly in Chennai during early 2010. The scenes set in the protagonist's newspaper office were shot on a set created to resemble such offices. Like his previous film Ayan, Anand wanted to film the songs in various locations across the world, and as a result, he and cinematographer Richard searched the internet for the picturesque locations and discussed with tourism ministries and frequent globetrotters before finalising the appropriate locations. The songs "Ennamo Yeadho" and "Amali Thumali" were filmed across Western Norway in places such as Trolltunga, Stalheim, Bergen and Preikestolen, becoming the first Tamil film to be shot in Norway.

The song "Venpaniye" was filmed at Harbin in China, during the International Ice and Snow Sculpture Festival. Part of the film was also shot at the Pondicherry University, Puducherry. Other locations of filming included Madurai, Tiruchirappalli, Pollachi, Hyderabad, Udupi, Bengaluru, Thekkady and Theni. Richard shot an action sequence using the Phantom Flex camera. Anand stated that the demo model was first used for Spider-Man (2002) and the camera can shoot in the high-definition format at 2,500 frames per second as opposed to the ordinary camera which can shoot 24 to 150 frames per second in a normal speed. Filming had wrapped by December 2010.

=== Post-production ===
After filming was completed, Ko entered into an extensive post-production phase by late-December. By early March 2011, the film entered into the final phase of post-production which involves, re-recording, sound mixing and editing. The title sequence of the film that runs for three-and-a-half minutes featured around 1000 photographs. Anand encouraged several photographers to send their best pictures for the title sequence, attributing it to setting the mood of the film.

== Music ==
The film's soundtrack and score were composed by Harris Jayaraj, with lyrics written by Pa. Vijay, Madhan Karky, Kabilan, Viveka, Vanamali, Sricharan, Emcee Jesz. It was distributed by Sony Music India which released the album on 19 January 2011.

== Release ==
=== Theatrical ===
Ko was earlier scheduled for theatrical release on 25 February 2011 but was postponed to 8 April 2011, due to Jiiva's other film Singam Puli which was scheduled to release on the same date and the 2011 Cricket World Cup being held during that time. The film was further postponed due to the 2011 Tamil Nadu Legislative Assembly election and was eventually released on 22 April. Ko opened in nearly 230 theatres in Tamil Nadu, making it Jiiva's biggest release to that point. It was also released in multiplexes across metros like Delhi, Mumbai, Pune, Chandigarh, Lucknow and Vadodara with English subtitles to attract non-Tamil audiences.

The Telugu dubbed version Rangam was released on 13 May 2011. It was presented by Super Good Films in Telugu states.

=== Home media ===
Ayngaran International released the film on DVD and Blu-ray. The film was later dubbed and released in Hindi as The Real Leader on YouTube in 2018.

== Reception ==
=== Box office ===
Ko opened in 15 theatres across Chennai, with major multiplexes Sathyam Cinemas, Escape Cinemas, PVR and INOX providing main screens for five shows in the opening weekend, and 36 shows in Mayajaal. At the opening weekend (22–24 April; Good Friday and Easter) the film netted ₹4.65 crore (equivalent to ₹10 crore or US$1.1 million in 2026) across Tamil Nadu. In the United Kingdom, the film collected €32,328 (₹23,68,000) in its opening weekend. Ko completed a 100-day run at the box office, both in its original and dubbed Telugu versions. According to trade analyst Sreedhar Pillai, the film, made on an overall cost of ₹14 crore (equivalent to ₹31 crore or US$3.4 million in 2026), collected ₹25 crore (equivalent to ₹56 crore or US$6.0 million in 2026) as of October 2011, including non-theatrical revenue.

=== Critical response ===
Malathi Rangarajan of The Hindu described the film as a "tale with a realistic twist" and praised Anand who "strikes gold with Ko. Blending the commercial with the realistic is a challenge, but K. V. Anand proves adept at it." N Venkateswaran of The Times of India gave four stars out of five citing: "With Ko, director Anand gives notice of his immense talent once again, making a movie that is all set to lord over the box office this summer". Deccan Herald wrote, "K V Anand is an ace lensman himself but his Ko, whatever it might mean, is like a newspaper with just banner headlines and posed pics. No body text. The intro lies in the tailpiece". Chennai Online wrote, "Anand impresses us with his eye for details in one sequence but soon manages to irritate viewers by resorting to archaic screenplay", appreciating the background score, editing and cinematography.

Baradwaj Rangan wrote, "If someone wants to make a case for the abolishment of song and dance from our cinema, Ko would be Exhibit A." He also went on to state that Ko was "a series of big scenes with no transitions, no segues, no scenes that just stop to smell the scenery." Pavithra Srinivasan of Rediff.com stated that "K V Anand's screenplay moves swiftly during the first half, courtesy the dialogues, and lags slightly in the second. Still, with its basic plot of politics, it has enough twists and turns to keep you occupied. Best of all are the light touches of sarcasm and humour that make it work." Sify wrote, "For an audience numbed by predictable Kollywood potboilers week after week, here is an original offering from KV Anand, a fearless filmmaker who doesn't insult your intelligence. He is able to cater to the needs of both the elite as well as mass audiences, which should be applauded".

Regarding the Telugu dubbed version, Venkateswara Rao Immadi Setti from Webdunia wrote that the film was made with the premise that there is nothing wrong with telling a single lie if it benefits ten people. The critic added that Anand's intelligence was revealed in crafting.

== Accolades ==
Award (Note: Awards, festivals and organisations are in alphabetical order.)	Date of ceremony (Note: Date is linked to the article about the awards held that year, wherever possible.)	Category	Recipient(s) and Nominee(s)	Result	Ref.
Ananda Vikatan Cinema Awards	5 January 2012	Best Costume Designer	Swetha Srinivas	Won	
The Chennai Times Film Awards	22 June 2012	Best Film	Ko – RS Infotainment	Won	
The Chennai Times Film Awards	22 June 2012	Best Actor in a Negative Role – Male	Ajmal Ameer	Won	
The Chennai Times Film Awards	22 June 2012	Best Music Director	Harris Jayaraj	Won	
The Chennai Times Film Awards	22 June 2012	Best Singer – Male	Aalap Raju – ("Ennamo Yeadho")	Won	
Filmfare Awards South	7 July 2012	Best Film – Tamil	Ko – RS Infotainment	Nominated	
Filmfare Awards South	7 July 2012	Best Director – Tamil	K. V. Anand	Nominated	
Filmfare Awards South	7 July 2012	Best Actor – Tamil	Jiiva	Nominated	
Filmfare Awards South	7 July 2012	Best Supporting Actor	Ajmal Ameer	Won	
Filmfare Awards South	7 July 2012	Best Music Director – Tamil	Harris Jayaraj	Nominated	
Filmfare Awards South	7 July 2012	Best Male Playback Singer – Tamil	Aalap Raju – ("Ennamo Yeadho")	Won	
Maa Music Awards	5 February 2012	Best Dubbing Song	"Enduko Emo"	Won	
Mirchi Music Awards South	4 August 2012	Listener's Choice Award for Song of the Year – Tamil	"Ennamo Yeadho"	Won	
Mirchi Music Awards South	4 August 2012	Listener's Choice Award for Album of the Year – Tamil	Ko	Won	
South Indian International Movie Awards	21–22 June 2012	Best Actor in a Negative Role	Ajmal Ameer	Won	
South Indian International Movie Awards	21–22 June 2012	Best Film	Ko – RS Infotainment	Won	
Tamil Nadu State Film Awards	13 July 2017	Best Music Director	Harris Jayaraj	Won	
Tamil Nadu State Film Awards	13 July 2017	Best Stunt Coordinator	Peter Hein	Won	
Tamil Nadu State Film Awards	13 July 2017	Best Art Director	D. R. K. Kiran	Won	
Tamil Nadu State Film Awards	13 July 2017	Best Costume Designer	Swetha Srinivas	Won	
Vijay Awards	16 June 2012	Best Actor	Jiiva	Nominated	
Vijay Awards	16 June 2012	Best Supporting Actor	Ajmal Ameer	Nominated	
Vijay Awards	16 June 2012	Best Supporting Actress	Piaa Bajpai	Nominated	
Vijay Awards	16 June 2012	Best Male Playback Singer	Aalap Raju – ("Ennamo Yeadho")	Nominated	
Vijay Awards	16 June 2012	Best Lyricist	Madhan Karky – ("Ennamo Yeadho")	Nominated	
Vijay Awards	16 June 2012	Best Background Score	Harris Jayaraj	Nominated	
Vijay Awards	16 June 2012	Best Costume Designer	Nalini Sriram	Nominated	
Vijay Awards	16 June 2012	Best Story, Screenplay Writer	K. V. Anand; Subha	Nominated	
Vijay Awards	16 June 2012	Best Editor	Anthony	Nominated	
Vijay Awards	16 June 2012	Favourite Film	Ko – RS Infotainment	Won	
Vijay Awards	16 June 2012	Favourite Director	K. V. Anand	Nominated	
Vijay Awards	16 June 2012	Favourite Song	"Ennamo Yeadho"	Won	

In addition to these awards, the film won the first Shri B Nagi Reddi Best Wholesome Entertainment Tamil Film Award. It was also one of several Tamil films considered as India's official entry to the Academy Awards, but was rejected by jury members for its apparent similarities to the 2009 film State of Play.

== Standalone sequel ==
A standalone sequel titled Ko 2 was announced in 2015 by the same producers which features a different cast and crew, except Prakash Raj, who reprised his role from the original. It is a remake of 2014 Telugu film Prathinidhi. The film was released in May 2016.

== Legacy ==
Ko catapulted Jiiva to stardom, and helped Ajmal attain numerous offers to play lead roles, despite his character being an antagonist. The placement of the song "Venpaniye" in Ko was, however, widely criticised, and Anand made self-deprecating humour of it in his next film Maattrraan (2012). Karthika's looks in Ko, especially her eyebrows, became known as the "Karthika Look" and was also a popular choice for beauty parlour customers, but also generated rumours of the actress performing cosmetic surgery.
