= Neethaane En Ponvasantham =

2012 film by Gautham Menon

- Theatrical release poster
- Directed by: Gautham Vasudev Menon
- Screenplay by: Reshma Ghatala; Gautham Vasudev Menon
- Story by: Reshma Ghatala
- Produced by: Elred Kumar; Reshma Ghatala; Gautham Vasudev Menon; Venkat Somasundaram
- Starring: Jiiva; Samantha Ruth Prabhu
- Cinematography: M. S. Prabhu; Om Prakash; S. R. Kathir; Jomon T. John; Santhana Krishnan Ravichandran; Manoj Paramahamsa
- Edited by: Anthony Gonsalvez; Praveen Antony; S. Kubenderan; S. Raghunath Varma; Jyoti Chetia; Renganaath Ravee
- Music by: Ilaiyaraaja
- Production company: Photon Kathaas
- Distributed by: RS Infotainment
- Release date: 13 December 2012
- Running time: 145 minutes
- Country: India
- Language: Tamil

Neethaane En Ponvasantham (transl. You are my Golden Springtime) is a 2012 Indian Tamil-language romantic drama film co written, co produced and directed by Gautham Vasudev Menon, starring Jiiva and Samantha. It was shot and released simultaneously in Telugu as Yeto Vellipoyindhi Manasu, with Nani replacing Jiiva, while the team also briefly filmed an incomplete Hindi version, Assi Nabbe Poorey Sau, with Aditya Roy Kapoor in the male lead, and Samantha playing the female lead in all the three versions. The film was based on a story written by Reshma Ghatala, who produced the film alongside Elred Kumar, Venkat Somasundaram, and Menon. The cinematography was handled by M. S. Prabhu and Om Prakash.

The film's background score and soundtrack were composed by Ilaiyaraaja which went on to become a chartbuster, and the soundtrack album sold a record 8.5 million units through various platforms on its release. The film was released on 13 December 2012, receiving positive to mixed reviews from critics, before enduring a good run at the box office.

The film was praised for its ravishing music and the chemistry between the lead actors; Jiiva and Samantha were appreciated for their performances, although the film's screenplay was criticised. At the end of its theatrical run Neethane En Ponvasantham received a number of awards, including the Filmfare Award for Best Tamil Actress for Samantha.

== Plot ==
The film begins with Varun gaining admission to an engineering college. One day, he and his friends take part in a cultural programme, where Varun finds his childhood sweetheart, Nithya, participating in a dance show. He begins wooing her by singing on stage and later meeting her. As they meet, the film rewinds to their early days when both were in the third standard. They had become good friends after a small incident, and their friendship had blossomed. But due to a misunderstanding, Nithya had decided not to meet Varun and never talk to him. However, as destiny would have it, they met again in their tenth standard. Nithya initially hesitates to talk with Varun, but sheds her inhibitions once Varun breaks the ice between them and resumes her friendship with him. Nithya is elected as the pupil leader at school, and as a pupil leader, she is in constant interaction with Deepak, another pupil leader and her classmate, much to the dismay of Varun. As a result, they have another fallout.

The film moves to their current meeting in college. Both forget their past misgivings and become friends again. This time, they fall in love. During the vacations, Nithya leaves India, and Varun is left for himself. Varun's elder brother, who works in a software company, wants to marry his colleague and confesses the same to his parents. His parents oblige by offering to negotiate with the girl's parents. However, his parents are humiliated by the negotiations. Varun, in the process of consoling them, realises that despite their embarrassment, his brother and parents care about him rather than themselves. He then decides to take his studies more seriously and begins preparing for the CAT. Nithya comes back to India and sees Varun not spending enough time with her due to his busy schedule. Nithya, too, initially understands his situation. However, when she learns that Varun is going to IIM Kozhikode, she too proposes to go with him. Varun rejects her proposal, citing that he is going to stay in a hostel, as staying outside in a rented house is expensive for his family. This leads to a heated argument between the two and eventually results in them breaking up again.

After graduating from IIM and landing a job, Varun searches for Nithya. He goes to Manapad in Tamil Nadu, where Nithya is working as a school teacher at a tsunami relief camp. Nithya refuses to talk to him, even after many attempts by Varun to start a conversation. When he finally gets her to talk, she rejects his advances, saying that she is happy with her current position. Disgusted at her rejection, Varun leaves the place. After some days, Nithya invites Varun to her sister's marriage. At the same time, Varun also invites Nithya to his engagement. Nithya, shocked at this sudden development, realises that she couldn't fully understand Varun and breaks down before her sister. However, to the surprise of Varun, she attends his reception, which makes him think twice about his marriage. He realises that he is still in love with Nithya. So he breaks his current engagement with the consent of his father and goes to Nithya's home to win back her confidence. Nithya also apologises to Varun about her past behaviour. They confess their feelings to each other and the film ends with a note being shown that they are happily married and continue to quarrel and love each other.

== Cast ==
- Jiiva as Varun Krishnan
  - Manav as Young Varun
- Samantha Ruth Prabhu as Nithya Vasudevan
  - Khushi Jain as Young Nithya
- Ravi Prakash as Harish
  - Saran Shakthi as Young Harish
- Santhanam as Prakash
- Vidyullekha Raman as Jenny
- Ravi Raghavendra as Krishnan
- Sriranjani as Nithya's mother
- Anupama Kumar as Varun's mother
- Christine Thambuswamy as Vidya Vasudevan
- Abhilash Babu as Deepak
- Abhishek Jain
- Arjun Rajkumar
- Rajkumar Pichumani as Varun's friend
- Ashwathy Ravikumar as Radhika
- Dhanya Balakrishna as Nithya's friend
- Kavita Srinivasan
- Kota Prasanth
- Preethi Rajendran
- Rajesh Trakkia
- Sahithya Jagannathan as Nithya's friend
- Shriya Sharma as Kavya Vasudevan
- Swetha Shekhar
- Vaidyanathan
- Vetri
- Vivek Pathak
- Nani as a train passenger (special appearance in "Kaatrai Konjam")
- VTV Ganesh as Ganesh (special appearance)
- Sathish Krishnan as a dancer at Vidya's wedding (special appearance)

== Production ==
=== Development ===
After agreeing terms with RS Infotainment to direct their next venture, Gautham Menon co-wrote a screenplay based on a story by Reshma Ghatala. The director then met Jiiva to discuss a potential collaboration in May 2011 for his next venture, which would begin following the completion of his current project Ekk Deewana Tha. Menon then cast Jiiva in the Tamil version of a bilingual film that he had originally planned to make featuring Ram and Samantha. Film editor Anthony, cinematographer Manoj Paramahamsa and composer A. R. Rahman were all touted to be a part of the film; however M. S. Prabhu replaced Paramahamsa and in December 2011 sources indicated that Rahman too would probably not work for this film, owing to his other commitments. Reports subsequently suggested that Harris Jayaraj may work with Menon again, but the composer dismissed those few days later. Menon clarified that he never announced any music director for the film and that he wanted to keep it as a surprise. In late January 2012, Ilaiyaraaja confirmed that he would be working with Gautham Menon.

A Telugu and a Hindi version, titled Yeto Vellipoyindhi Manasu and Assi Nabbe Poorey Sau, were also being simultaneously made, with Nani in the former and Aditya Roy Kapoor playing the lead role in the latter, while Samantha played the female lead in all versions. The title was revealed through the first publicity posters to be Neethaane En Ponvasantham, inspired by a song from the 1982 film Ninaivellam Nithya. An official announcement was made by the producers of the film, RS Infotainment, that a photo shoot was planned in August and the film would also shoot portions across the United Kingdom. To prepare for his role, Jiiva had to lose weight for the film and had to undertake diet regimens and work out sessions to get in shape for the character. Furthermore, it was revealed that he would sport three different looks in the film as the film encompasses 15 years. Ravi Raghavendra and Anupama Kumar were added to the cast to play Jiiva's parents, while Santhanam was also chosen to play a college student in the film. Film historian Mohan Raman's daughter Vidyullekha Raman, a theatre artist, made her film acting debut as the female lead's friend.

=== Filming ===
The film had been set to begin the first schedule on 15 August 2011 but delays led to it only starting a fortnight later. It eventually commenced the initial shoot from 29 August 2011 with a photo shoot held and publicity posters were released the following week. The team shot across Chennai in the first week of the first schedule, with scenes filmed at the cinema multiplex Mayajaal and at a coffee shop, Café Coffee Day, on the East Coast Road. Many scenes were shot in Sri Sivasubramaniya Nadar College of Engineering near Kelambakkam, a college in Chennai, where Jiiva's character was shown to be studying. The film was shot alongside the two other versions, with the film shooting the same scene thrice with the various casts. Filming wrapped in November 2012 with a song shoot.

The Hindi remake of the film was temporarily stalled, following the box office failure of Ekk Deewana Tha and Menon noted he planned to observe the reception of the Tamil and Telugu versions and then probably continue with its remake in Hindi after completing pending projects. However, Menon insisted that only Aditya's dates had been a problem and that instead the team would go ahead with the Tamil and Telugu release while postponing the Hindi version. Although statements were released by Photon Kathaas suggesting the venture was set to resume, it has been indefinitely shelved.

== Music ==
Menon approached Ilaiyaraaja to compose music for the film. The soundtrack album consists of eight tracks, with lyrics penned by Na. Muthukumar, replacing Gautham Menon's usual associate lyricist Thamarai for the first time. 7 singers have lent their voices for the songs, including composer Ilaiyaraaja, Karthik, Raaja's son Yuvan Shankar Raja, N. S. Krishnan's grand daughter Ramya NSK, Suraj Jagan, Sunidhi Chauhan and Bela Shende. Touted as one of the most anticipated musicals of 2012 in Tamil cinema, the production house sold the musical rights at an altitudinous price of ₹22 million (US$240,000), setting a record price for audio rights acquirement which were sold to Sony Music India.

Over one lakh audio CDs were booked in advance, prior to the audio launch. Neethaane En Ponvasantham's soundtrack was released on 1 September 2012 at the Jawaharlal Nehru Indoor Stadium, Chennai in a grand event, during which the songs were performed live by the original artists along with the Anglo-Indian Music Productions orchestra and Hungarian session musicians who had also worked on the film's score.

== Release ==
Neethaane En Ponvasantham was earlier scheduled for a theatrical release in the summer of 2012, but was delayed as filming was not completed by then. The film was given a U certificate by the Central Board of Film Certification without any cuts, and released on 14 December 2012, along with Kumki. Both films had huge expectations from the audience because of their soundtracks, that turned out to be a success prior to the film. Two days before the release of Neethaane En Ponvasantham along with Kumki, the advanced bookings for the first weekend were sold out.

The film's distribution rights in Coimbatore were acquired by Cosmo Village for a record price. Abirami Mega Mall acquired the distribution rights for the film in Chennai region, which ensured a grand release in 30 screens across the city. AGS Entertainment acquired the distribution rights in the Chengalpattu region. The film's Telugu version Yeto Vellipoyindhi Manasu also released on the same date as the Tamil version.

== Marketing ==
The first poster of Neethane En Ponvasantham depicting the lead pair was unveiled in early September 2011. On Valentine's Day (14 February 2012), a teaser trailer of 50 seconds featuring Samantha and Jiiva with an instrumental version of the song "Neethaane En Ponvasantham" playing in the background was released. On 1 September 2012, the official theatrical trailer of the film was released. The response to the theatrical trailer was highly positive, that it crossed 1.2 million views in two days of its release, breaking the record of the most ever viewed Tamil film trailer held earlier by Billa 2. Since much of the film's footage, which were shot had not made into the final edit, some of the deleted sequences were released as promotional materials, prior to the film's release, along with some selected scenes from the film to increase the expectations from the audience.

== Reception ==
Neethaane En Ponvasantham received mixed reviews upon release. M Suganth of The Times of India rated it 3.5 out of 5 and called it "an ideal date movie, despite the slow pace and the flaws". Vivek Ramz of in.com rated it 3 out of 5 and wrote, "Neethaane En Ponvasantham is not a bad film at all and has its moments, but one expects more from director of Gautham's calibre. Overall, it's a one-time watch!" Pavithra Srinivasan of Rediff gave the movie 2.5/5 stars, calling the movie "disappointing... The second half of the story is full of tears, recriminations and quarrels that make little sense. The arguments and debates...fall flat, and you get tired of the back-and-forth." IBN Live said the movie "sadly...fails to engage the audience with its clichéd presentation".

Baradwaj Rangan summarized that "With Vinnai Thaandi Varuvaaya (which is gamely spoofed here) and now this film, Menon has liberated the love story – as Imtiaz Ali has done in Bollywood – from simply hewing to the trajectory between boy-meets-girl and and-they-lived-happily-ever-after. The director is no longer the friendly family physician, ensuring that the heart will go on. He is, instead, a pathologist, inspecting this infection called love for symptoms and malign manifestations. It’s not for the faint of heart."

== Accolades ==
Award	Date of ceremony (Note: Date is linked to the article about the awards held that year, wherever possible.)	Category	Recipient(s) and nominee(s)	Result	Ref.
Ananda Vikatan Cinema Awards	16 January 2013	Best Actress	Samantha Ruth Prabhu	Won	
The Chennai Times Film Awards	4 November 2013	Best Director	Gautham Vasudev Menon	Nominated	
The Chennai Times Film Awards	4 November 2013	Best Actress	Samantha Ruth Prabhu	Nominated	
The Chennai Times Film Awards	4 November 2013	Best Music Director	Ilaiyaraaja	Nominated	
The Chennai Times Film Awards	4 November 2013	Best Lyrics	Na. Muthukumar for "Ennodu Vaa Vaa"	Nominated	
The Chennai Times Film Awards	4 November 2013	Best Singer – Male	Karthik for "Ennodu Vaa Vaa"	Nominated	
The Chennai Times Film Awards	4 November 2013	Best Singer – Female	Ramya NSK for "Sattru Munbu"	Won	
Filmfare Awards South	20 July 2013	Best Actress – Tamil	Samantha Ruth Prabhu	Won	
Filmfare Awards South	20 July 2013	Best Supporting Actress – Tamil	Vidyullekha Raman	Nominated	
Filmfare Awards South	20 July 2013	Best Music Director – Tamil	Ilaiyaraaja	Nominated	
Filmfare Awards South	20 July 2013	Best Lyricist – Tamil	Na. Muthukumar for "Kaatrai Konjam"	Nominated	
Filmfare Awards South	20 July 2013	Best Male Playback Singer – Tamil	Karthik for "Kaatrai Konjam"	Nominated	
Filmfare Awards South	20 July 2013	Best Female Playback Singer – Tamil	Ramya NSK for "Sattru Munbu"	Won	
Mirchi Music Awards South	26 August 2013	Song of the Year	"Saayndhu Saayndhu"	Nominated	
Mirchi Music Awards South	26 August 2013	Album of the Year	Neethaane En Ponvasantham	Nominated	
Mirchi Music Awards South	26 August 2013	Male Vocalist of the Year	Karthik for "Kaatrai Konjam"	Won	
Mirchi Music Awards South	26 August 2013	Female Vocalist of the Year	Ramya NSK for "Sattru Munbu"	Nominated	
Mirchi Music Awards South	26 August 2013	Music Composer of the Year	Ilaiyaraaja for "Saayndhu Saayndhu"	Nominated	
Mirchi Music Awards South	26 August 2013	Lyricist of the Year	Na. Muthukumar for "Mudhal Murai"	Nominated	
Mirchi Music Awards South	26 August 2013	Upcoming Female Vocalist of the Year	Ramya NSK for "Sattru Munbu"	Nominated	
South Indian International Movie Awards	12–13 September 2013	Best Actress – Tamil	Samantha Ruth Prabhu	Nominated	
South Indian International Movie Awards	12–13 September 2013	Best Music Director – Tamil	Ilaiyaraaja	Nominated	
Tamil Nadu State Film Awards	13 July 2017	Best Actor	Jiiva	Won	
Tamil Nadu State Film Awards	13 July 2017	Special Prize (Best Actress)	Samantha Ruth Prabhu	Won	
Vijay Awards	11 May 2013	Best Actress	Samantha Ruth Prabhu	Won	
Vijay Awards	11 May 2013	Favourite Heroine	Samantha Ruth Prabhu	Nominated	
Vijay Awards	11 May 2013	Best Supporting Actress	Vidyullekha Raman	Nominated	
Vijay Awards	11 May 2013	Best Music Director	Ilaiyaraaja	Nominated	
Vijay Awards	11 May 2013	Best Female Playback Singer	Ramya NSK for "Sattru Munbu"	Won	
Vijay Awards	11 May 2013	Best Female Playback Singer	Sunidhi Chauhan for "Mudhal Murai"	Nominated	
Vijay Awards	11 May 2013	Best Dialogue	Gautham Vasudev Menon	Nominated	
