= Veera (2018 film) =

2018 film by Rajaraman

- Theatrical Release Poster
- Directed by: Rajaraman
- Written by: Bakkiyam Shankar
- Produced by: Elred Kumar
- Starring: Kreshna; Iswarya Menon; Karunakaran
- Cinematography: A. Kumaran
- Edited by: T. S. Suresh
- Music by: Leon James
- Production company: RS Infotainment
- Distributed by: Orange Creations
- Release date: 16 February 2018
- Country: India
- Language: Tamil

Veera is a 2018 Indian Tamil-language action film directed by Rajaraman and produced by Elred Kumar of RS Infotainment. The film stars Kreshna and Iswarya Menon in the leading roles, with Karunakaran, Rajendran and Yogi Babu in supporting roles. Leon James composed the original score and soundtrack for the film, while Bakkiyam Shankar wrote the film's script. Having begun production in August 2015, the film had gone through a change of cast before being released on 16 February 2018.

== Cast ==
- Kreshna as Veeramuthu
- Iswarya Menon as Renuka
- Karunakaran as Pachamuthu
- Radha Ravi as Sketch Sekhar
- Thambi Ramaiah as Ezhukinaru Ezhumazhai
- Rajendran as Jonty Rhodes
- Yogi Babu as Jithesh
- Aadukalam Naren as Boxer Rajendran
- R. N. R. Manohar as Maavattam Thamizhazhagan
- Charandeep as Kulla Ponnu Kumar
- Sonia Bose Venkat as Rajendran's wife
- Kanna Ravi as Sura Murugan
- Karthik Nag as Goon

== Production ==
In August 2015, Bobby Simha signed on to appear in a venture titled Veera directed by debutant Rajaraman and produced by Elred Kumar of RS Infotainment. The production house signed him on for three films, with Ko 2 (2016) and Kavalai Vendam (2016) also announced to be in production during the same period. The film was titled after producer Panchu Arunachalam allowed them to use the title that he had previously owned after making the 1994 film of the same name. Rookie actress Iswarya Menon was signed on to play the leading female role, while Bala Saravanan was selected to play a major supporting role. Subsequently, in November 2015, Bobby Simha opted out of the film citing scheduling issues and was replaced by Vishnu in the lead role. During the same month, Karunakaran was also selected to replace Bala Saravanan, while Leon James was signed as the music composer after the producers were impressed with his work in Ko 2.

Vishnu also later opted out from the film and was replaced by Krishna, with production beginning quietly in mid-2016. By September 2016, the team had completed the majority of the shoot and the producers released the first look poster during the same month. Cinematographer Kumaran revealed that "seventy per cent" of the film was completed in the first schedule, before the second schedule began in September 2016. The film marked actress Iswarya's first big role in Tamil films, and in the film, she portrayed an Ooty-born girl, who moves to Chennai. For the role, she had to juggle speaking in normal Tamil and with a north Madras slang.

The team initially planned to release the film for January 2017, but production continued beyond the date. The film was sold to Orange Creations in a distribution deal in early September 2017, with a release date planned for later in the month, but the date was later skipped. Another two proposed release dates in December 2017 were postponed at the last minute, after the distributors, Orange Creations failed to get enough screens for a wide theatrical release.

== Soundtrack ==
Veera

Soundtrack album by Leon James
- Released: 23 March 2018
- Genre: Film soundtrack
- Label: Sony Music India
- Producer: Leon James

Leon James chronology
Kavalai Vendam (2016)	Veera (2018)	Next Enti? (2018)

The film's music was composed by Leon James, in his fourth film venture following Kanchana 2 (2015), Ko 2 (2016) and Kavalai Vendam (2016). The soundtrack was released on 23 March 2017 through Sony Music India.

Track listing
No.	Title	Lyrics	Singer(s)	Length
1.	"Ootaanda Soltuvaa"	Ko Sesha	Leon James	3:32
2.	"Verrattaama Verratturiye"	Ko Sesha	Sid Sriram, Neeti Mohan	4:36
3.	"Mama Mama Mayangadhe"	Krishna Kishore	Anthony Daasan	3:08
4.	"Pogaadhey Kanmaniye"	Na. Muthukumar	Pradeep Kumar	3:38
5.	"Nijaaru Usaaru"	Na. Muthukumar	Lawrence, Mahalingam	4:45
