= Muppozhudhum Un Karpanaigal =

2012 Indian film by Elred Kumar

- Theatrical release poster
- Directed by: Elred Kumar
- Written by: Elred Kumar
- Produced by: Jayaraman; Elred Kumar; James
- Starring: Atharvaa; Amala Paul
- Cinematography: Shakthi
- Edited by: Anthony L. Ruben
- Music by: G. V. Prakash Kumar
- Production company: RS Infotainment
- Release date: 17 February 2012
- Running time: 140 minutes
- Country: India
- Language: Tamil

Muppozhudhum Un Karpanaigal (transl. Imagining you, all the time) is a 2012 Indian Tamil-language romantic psychological thriller film directed by Elred Kumar, starring Atharvaa and Amala Paul, while Jayaprakash, Anupama Kumar, Santhanam, Yashika and Nassar played supporting roles. The music was scored by G. V. Prakash Kumar. The film was released on 17 February 2012. It was later screened at the 2012 Cannes Film Festival in a non-award ceremony.

== Plot ==
The film opens with Ram fronting a car driven by two guys apparently drunk and rich and with their girlfriends. He tries to kill them and eventually they escape in the car opening the title. Then it turns to be that Ram enjoys a successful career in information technology. He is hit on by Radhi as office romance. He turns down her interest and reveals he is in love with a girl who resides in Bangalore and is going to visit her. Ram drives to Bangalore and meets Charu in her apartment. While sleeping, Ram wakes up goes to the streets, search and kills a person (one of them in the car in first scene). Eventually it is revealed that Charu is in danger and Ram is safeguarding her by not letting her out of that apartment until he cleans up the city for her safety.

Ram's CEO Latha comes to India from the US and is also engaged to a guy named Vicky. Latha begins to ask her PA Chandru to find out more about Ram. Latha then asks Chandru to convince Ram to give her lift home, which then Ram agrees to. As Ram and Latha are driving home, they are followed by a red lorry, which attempts to kill both Ram and Latha. Ram manages to push Latha off the car as well as saving himself. Ram is seriously hurt and is taken to the hospital by Latha. Latha then speaks to the doctor, her uncle. Latha explains the doctor that she knows Ram personally and doesn't understand why Ram doesn't recognise her. Ram being unconscious, begins to mutter Charu's name. While Ram and Latha's uncle are having a brief conversation, Latha listens in. It is revealed that Ram and Charu used to work together for a competition and Ram fell in love with Charu from the moment that he met her. It came to a situation where Charu goes to a club to meet a work friend after having found out that her laptop data had been corrupted and she is unable to reach her work. She goes to the club to get a USB backup of her laptop data, before having been teased by drunk guys. These two guys happen to be the two guys Ram tries to kill at the beginning of the film.

Charu goes to the police station to report the two guys who teased her, however, the guys did not take this well and threaten Charu. Ram witnesses this and assumes that there is a problem, however, Charu ensures Ram that he has nothing to worry about and that everything has been sorted.

On the day of the competition, Ram and Charu go through their presentation, to make sure that they have got everything that they need. Ram looks behind him and notices that he has forgotten something. He explains to Charu that he needs to go back, but will be back in time for the competition. Charu being hesitant at first eventually agrees. Ram went back to get the gift that he has bought Charu, so that he can give to her when he proposes his love for her, after the competition.

Ram then manages to go the competition venue on time, however, sees the two guys who teased Charu inside the venue. Ram jumps to the conclusion that the guys have come after Charu and are here to kill her. Ram tries to find them however fails. Ram then reaches the balcony where he witnesses Charu being taken into a car by two guys, which he assumes are the two teasers. Ram then runs after the car but then loses the car and is pushed on the side of the road, where he becomes delusional. He then goes home, and waits for Charu without changing his clothes or having a shower. He sits in one position for two days. Charu then comes home safe and sound, and is revealed to the doctor that he and Charu have been together ever since.

The doctor comes out of the room to see a shocked Latha. Latha then reveals to her uncle (the doctor) that her family know her as Latha, but she introduced herself to Ram as Charu, as her name was indeed Charulatha. Latha then reveals what actually happen; Ram went to get the present, while she was left to handle the presentation herself, and ends up winning the whole competition, Her father was a main judge on the competition and was also revealed that this competition was built to see how Charu can handle a whole business and would take over from her father. It was then revealed that Ram would not get a position in this company at all, and with Charu feeling guilty, she calls after Ram, which Ram hears and sees. She was taken into the car by her father which made it look like she was being kidnapped to Ram.

The doctor then persuades Latha to act like the Charu that she was while living with him. At first she disagrees, however, after Ram gains his consciousness, Ram receives a call from a so-called 'Charu'. Latha goes back to Bangalore, where she visits the woman who is acting as Charu to Ram over the phone. It is revealed that a blind woman acts as Charu, only because Ram keeps calling her and asking about her and refuses to believe that this isn't Charu's number. Latha then breaks into her old Bangalore home, and spies on Ram, with her uncle assisting her. Ram comes home and hugs a so-called Charu. We then realise that it isn't actually Charu he is hugging, but he is hugging nothing but an empty space.

Latha then asks her uncle what had happened to Ram. Ram is suffering from severe delusions and is imagining that Charu is still present with him, hence the reason why Ram didn't recognise her in the first place. The only way these delusions would go, is if Latha acts as if she was Charu, back in Bangalore.

Latha then acts as Charu and begins falling in love with Ram. Ram then explains to her that they are going to get married soon. They then reach a temple, where Charu and Ram are meant to marry. Latha had planned with her uncle and Chandru a fake killing so that Ram's delusions can leave him, which fails. Latha is then genuinely kidnapped by two guys, who are her so known fiancé's friends. It is revealed that her fiancé Vicky, is in fact gay and his friends can not accept Vicky marrying any girl who gets in his way which includes Latha. The two guys attempt on killing Latha but is defeated by Ram. Ram then attempts to save Latha by taking her to the hospital but is then hit on the head. Ram gains his consciousness and goes home and waits for Charu at home, sitting in a position for two days, waiting for Charu. The delusion he sees is Charu coming back to him, in tears and saying that she is alright. Ram bursts into tears and goes to have a shower so that he can relax and start over with Charu. Latha however is still in hospital with her father and uncle by her side. Her uncle reveals that it was him who hit Ram on the head, so that he can take Latha to the hospital to get her checked out, yet he explains to Charu that she is better off with Ram as he will keep her happy. Latha's father agrees and Latha insists that she goes to Ram.

Latha then goes home to Ram, who still believes that Charu has come home long before. The film ends with Latha raising her arms asking for a hug from Ram, which Ram smiles and gives her.

== Cast ==
- Atharvaa as Ramachandran (Ram)
- Amala Paul as Charulatha alias Charu and Latha
- Anupama Kumar as Meenakshi, Mother Of Ram
- Jayaprakash as Dr. Rudhran, Charulatha Uncle
- Santhanam as Chandru
- Yashika as Radhi
- Nassar as Priest
- Raviprakash
- Niranjan Jayaprakash
- Cool Suresh as Henchman
- Lollu Sabha Manohar as Kidnapper
- Tarun Shatriya as man who teases Charu

== Production ==
The producer of the film, Elred Kumar, took over directing responsibilities from Ganesh Vinayak, halfway through production.

Filming began in January 2011. Filming was completed in late November 2011 in Las Vegas, where important scenes were canned, including the song "Oru Murai". The team shot three songs in the Grand Canyon, Las Vegas and New York City.

== Soundtrack ==
The soundtrack was composed by G. V. Prakash Kumar. He composed the songs for the film during a production trip to China. The single "Oru Murai" was released on 28 September 2011 in Chennai; its remix version was released in 6 November in Las Vegas. The audio was launched on 18 December 2011 at Sathyam Cinemas, Chennai with attractive invitation having a Barbie doll and a packet of gems inside.

Musicperk.com rated the album 7/10 quoting: "This album is pretty decent. Has one or two great songs like ‘Kangal Neeye’ and ‘Yaar Aval Yaaro'". Karthik of Milliblog wrote, "Capably youthful soundtrack from the young composer".

All lyrics are written by Thamarai. Rap by Blaaze.

Track listing
No.	Title	Singer(s)	Length
1.	"Mazhai Pozhiyum"	Aalap Raju, G. V. Prakash Kumar, Megha	5:14
2.	"Oh Sunanda"	Raman Mahadevan, Caroline, Megha, Nivas, Rahul Nambiar, Chinmayi, Jurrian, Daniëlle	5:33
3.	"Oru Murai"	G. V. Prakash Kumar, Blaaze, Andrea Jeremiah	5:42
4.	"Yaar Aval Yaaro"	Mohammad Irfan Ali	5:53
5.	"Kangal Neeye Kaatrum Neeye"	Sithara	5:40
6.	"Sokkupodi"	Baba Sehgal, Shruti Haasan	3:49
7.	"Oru Murai" (Remix)	G. V. Prakash Kumar, Blaaze, Andrea Jeremiah	4:05
Total length:			35:56

== Release and reception ==
Muppozhudhum Un Karpanaigal received a U certificate from the censor board after 32 cuts. Elred Kumar said he agreed to those changes as U-certifiied Tamil films were then eligible for entertainment tax exemption from the Tamil Nadu government, but the dubbed Telugu version remained unedited due to the Andhra Pradesh government having no such law. The film was released on 17 February 2012, and received mixed reviews from critics. Sify wrote, "This edge-of-the-seat thriller with plenty of style, suavely shot with foot tapping songs make up for the plot holes that threaten to eat into this otherwise engaging film". N. Venkateswaran from The Times of India rated it 3 out 5. Anupama Kumar won the Vijay Award for Best Supporting Actress for her role.

== Potential remake ==
The producer had signed a contract with a company from Los Angeles call Eccho Remake as they have acquired the remake rights for the North American territory.
