= Mandaadi =

2026 Indian film by Mathimaran Pugazhendhi

- Theatrical release poster
- Directed by: Mathimaran Pugazhendhi
- Screenplay by: Mathimaran Pugazhendhi; Elred Kumar; R. Mohanavasanthan; Thiral Sankar
- Dialogues by: Ameer Jamal Khan; Mathimaran Pugazhendhi
- Story by: Mathimaran Pugazhendhi
- Produced by: Elred Kumar
- Starring: Soori; Suhas
- Cinematography: S. R. Kathir
- Edited by: Pradeep E. Ragav
- Music by: G. V. Prakash Kumar
- Production company: RS Infotainment
- Distributed by: see below
- Release date: 10 September 2026
- Running time: 154 minutes
- Country: India
- Language: Tamil
- Budget: est. ₹75 crore
- Box office: est. ₹133.82–150 crore (Note: Mandaadi's reported worldwide gross varies between ₹133.82 crore (The Week) – ₹150 crore (Cinema Express).)

Mandaadi (transl. Sea Wanderer) (Note: Also the title character.) is a 2026 Indian Tamil-language sports action drama film written and directed by Mathimaran Pugazhendhi and produced by Elred Kumar under RS Infotainment. The film stars Soori in the titular role and Suhas (in his Tamil film debut) alongside Mahima Nambiar, Ravindra Vijay, Krish Hassan, Mithun Jai Sankar, Bala Saravanan, and Sathyaraj.

The film was officially announced in January 2025 under the tentative title Soori's Next; the official title was announced that April. Filming began in mid-2025 and wrapped in April 2026. The film has music composed by G. V. Prakash Kumar, cinematography handled by S. R. Kathir and editing by Pradeep E. Ragav.

Mandaadi was released in theatres on 10 September 2026, coinciding with the Vinayagar Chaturthi weekend in standard, IMAX, EPIQ and Dolby Cinema formats. The film was a critical and commercial success grossing around ₹133–₹150 crore against a budget of ₹75 crore, becoming the 4th highest grossing Tamil film of 2026.

== Plot ==
Maari, the son of Angel Rakkamma and Singaram starts a new team of sail boat racers, "Mugavai Mainthans" for the annual sailboat racing competition in their village of Mugavaipattinam, Ramanathapuram as part of the Mariamman Temple festival. This leads to a clash with Kittan, the son of Sattapuli, the ruthless owner of "Tsunami Riders", a sailboat racing team dominating the competition. This becomes a big rivalry between both and Maari tries to kill Kittan during the festival but Sattapuli saves him. Enraged, Sattapuli sends his men to find and kill Maari. Afraid of this incident, Baagam Priya, Maari's lover sends him to Chennai where Muthukaali "Kaali", a former legendary sailor and Angel's ex-boyfriend, works as lifeguard in VGP Water Theme Park. During a conversation with Singaram, Kaali learns that Maari, who is interested in sailboat racing wanted to join the Tsunami Riders, but was driven away by Kittan, leading to him starting a team of his own, which is a revived Mugavai Mainthans. Not able to digest this, Kittan destroys the Mainthans' boat by throwing bombs at it, leading to the subsequent festival fracas. He also learns about Sattapuli's rise and dominance, where no local player is allowed to be a part of Tsunami Riders.

Kaali assures Singaram of Maari's safety, while Singaram assembles the village council in a desperate attempt to save his son's life, but to no avail as Sattapuli is hell-bent on killing Maari. Meanwhile Sattapuli, through his brother-in-law finds out that Maari is in Chennai under Kaali's care, much to his shock. Sattapuli sends men to Chennai to kill Maari, but Kaali saves him and escapes from the water park. Alarmed, Singaram advises Kaali to send Maari somewhere safe, but spurred by his friend's crisis, Kaali returns to Mugavaipattinam with Maari and at the village council, openly announces that he will train the Mugavai Mainthans for this year's race, challenging Sattapuli in the process. Sattapuli agrees on the condition that if the Mainthans lose, they shall never be allowed to participate again. He returns to the shores to train an underdog crew of local fishermen and Maari for the high-stakes race. Meanwhile, Maari learns that his mother was Kaali's ex-lover, leading to a resentment towards him and skipping training, but coerced by her, changes his mind. Sattapuli uses his influence to prepone the race by a week in an attempt to sabotage Kaali's training under the guise of security protocol due to a Central Minister visit. However, Kaali motivates his team to participate in the practice match.

In the practice match, the team performs well and take the lead, but their boat gets into a major accident just before their victory, where the knot to their sail snaps, turning their boat over completely. On knowing about this, Angel rushes to the spot where she lashes out at Kaali for endangering her son. Later, Kaali finds out that the rope was deliberately sabotaged by Kittan before the race, leading to the accident. Kaali gets into a violent confrontation with Sattapuli and Kittan, where Maari intervenes and tells he will backout of the race, due to players getting injured in the mishap, but Kaali declares whoever wins the festival race must be the village team and the loser must never compete again. After this, Kaali reveals the flashback of what happened in his life in 2006.

Past: Kaali, Sattapuli and Singaram were all one gang of friends and powerful boat racers of "Mugavai Manithans" in Ramanathapuram, coached by Machamuni. They were always tough competitors and consistent winners in the traditional annual boat race. Kaali and Angel, the daughter of Machamuni were deeply in love. One day, Machamuni, Kaali and Sattapuli noticed a businessman with a fibre boat in their place saying they were going to manufacture such boats and sell in the market. This made Machamuni upset because he felt that in the future, only fibre boats will be used for fishing and racing and there will be no value for boats made of wood. Nevertheless, Muthukkaali suggested Sattapuli to start manufacturing the boat before outsiders to start the business and dominate the locals. Sattapuli considered it a good proposition, however, another friend in the gang teased Sattapuli by saying that his father was a thief in Burma and came to Ramanathapuram in hiding. This created a rift between the group and Kaali supports Sattapuli, leading to all the others assaulting and eliminating him from their group. Sattapuli successfully started his fibre boat manufacture business, fully supported by Kaali against Machamuni's wishes. Unbeknownst to Kaali, Sattapuli and his father looted the Tsunami relief fund from a government office; when noticed by the security guard, Sattapuli killed and burned him along with the office building, which later was portrayed as a fire accident so as to cover the theft and murder. Before the race, some of the Mainthans' teammates were arrested by the Coast Guard of Sri Lanka, jeopardising their participation.

When Sattapuli tried to bring his brother-in-law as a replacement, Machamuni strongly opposed on the grounds that he uses bombs to catch fish, endangering the marine ecosystem of the area; also he decided to withdraw from the race in the current situation. In retaliation, Sattapuli started a new team named "Tsunami Riders" with his brother-in-law and decided to participate in the race. Kaali tried to make Machamuni understand, trying to relent him from his decision, leaving Kaali furious. Angel later met Kaali and convinced him to meet her father, where Machamuni requested him to reconsider his decision. On matchday, Machamuni filed a petition to stop the Tsunami Riders from participating in the race. While discussing the matter in the village council, Sattapuli's father disrespected Machamuni, which was witnessed by Kaali. Enraged, he kicked him from behind after Machamuni left and severed all ties with Sattapuli. After learning that his father had been paralysed due to the impact of the spine onto the boat resulting from Kaali's blow, he resolved to kill him.

Meanwhile, Singaram explained the dilemma faced by Kaali between love and friendship, prompting Machamuni to meet Kaali in person. He met a heavily drunk Kaali, who apologised for his mistakes and confessed his love for Angel. Just then, Machamuni noticed Sattapuli's men arriving to kill Kaali; desperate to save him, he placed Kaali on a boat and let it go into the sea, safeguarding him. Even though he put up a brave fight, Sattapuli eventually cornered and killed Machamuni. At her father's funeral, Angel cut all ties with Kaali and held him equally responsible for his death and challenged him to never touch a boat or stay in the village. Heartbroken, Kaali left both his love and his career for Chennai.

Present: Both Sattapuli and Kaali register their respective teams representing Mugavaipattinam for the race, the winner being the sole representative for the village. On one occasion, Singaram, fed up of Angel's constant hate towards Kaali, reveals that Kaali was the one who advised Singaram to marry her and that if not for him, Maari would've been killed long back. Kaali and Maari successfully recruit team members and resume training. Meanwhile, Kaali meets Angel and tearfully begs for her forgiveness the day before the race. On the day of the race, Kaali learns that a teammate has betrayed them and joined Sattapuli. Even though Kaali initially declines to join as the 6th player, Angel motivates him to do so, implying that she has forgiven him. Seeing Kaali as a player, Sattapuli decides to enter as a player too. The race begins, with many boats toppling due to strong winds. Sattapuli unfairly gains the upper hand by attaching an illegal anchor to Kaali's boat, leaving them at the last position and demotivating the team. Kaali however removes the anchor and leads the boat through various deceits by Sattapuli, climbing the ranks.

At this point, a huge whirlpool forms in the route, forcing the boats to take a new route around it. Kaali, however decides to take the original route, defying the vortex and motivating his teammates to follow suit. As the boat gets sucked into the whirlpool, Maari loses his grip and falls into the vortex, but is saved by Kaali. Kaali later realises that a way to escape the whirlpool opens due to the wind changing direction, and successfully emerges out, surging forward. As they catch up with Tsunami Riders, Sattapuli and his men attack Kaali's boat mid-sea, attempting to cut the ropes. Kaali fights back and subdues Sattapuli, but notices that the mast of the Tsunami Riders' boat has broken. Suddenly, Sattapuli gets trapped in the ropes of the mast and falls into the sea. Kaali realises that the sterns of both boats are locked in a manner which will make his boat finish second, but he successfully stomps and breaks the stern, allowing his boat to finish first and thereby winning the race.

== Cast ==
- Soori as Muthukaali "Kaali" / Mandaadi
- Suhas as Sattapuli (Voice dubbed by Mathimaran Pugazhendhi)
- Mahima Nambiar as Angel Rakkamma, Kaali's ex-girlfriend, Singaram's wife, Machamuni's daughter, and Maari's mother
- Ravindra Vijay as Singaram, Angel's husband, Maari's father and Kaali's friend
- Krish Hassan as Kittaan, Sattapuli's son
- Mithun Jai Sankar as Maari, Angel and Singaram's son, Machamuni's grandson
- Bala Saravanan as Qatar Ravi, Muthukaali's Friend
- Stun Siva as Saatapuli's father and Kittan’s grandfather
- Ramachandran Durairaj as Theekoluthi
- Phathmen as Kittan’s uncle and Saendhamma's brother
- Aadukalam Murugadoss as Kathir
- B. Krithika Balasubramaniam as Baagam Priyazh, Muthukaali's niece and Maari's girlfriend
- Rekha Kumanan as Saendhamma, Sattapuli's wife and Kittan's mother
- Sengol Sagayaraj as Keppas
- Rajesh Gopishetty
- Anbarasi as Muthukali’s sister
- "Nakkalites" Dhanam as Muthukaali's aunt
- Sathyaraj as Machamuni, Muthukaali and Sattapuli's mentor; Angel's father and Maari's grandfather (extended cameo appearance)

== Production ==
After the success of Viduthalai Part 2, in mid-January 2025, RS Infotainment confirmed its next project with Soori in the lead role, directed by Mathimaran Pugazhendhi, a former assistant director of Vetrimaaran who earlier directed Selfie (2022). On 18 April 2025, Soori officially revealed the title of his sixth film in the lead role to be a sea-based action drama titled Mandaadi, with Vetrimaaran as the creative producer of the film. Apart from Soori, the film stars Suhas and Mahima Nambiar in the lead role alongside Sathyaraj, Achyuth Kumar, Sachana Namidass, and Ravindra Vijay in pivotal roles. Suhas, a Telugu actor, made his Tamil film debut. The technical team consists of music composer G. V. Prakash Kumar, cinematographer S. R. Kathir, editor Pradeep E. Ragav and stunt choreographer Peter Hein.

Filming had begun by May 2025, and was described as progressing at a "rapid pace" by August. That October, production was suspended after a boat used for filming capsized and equipment worth almost ₹1 crore (equivalent to ₹1.0 crore or US$110,000 in 2026) was lost. However, production eventually resumed, and wrapped in April 2026.

== Music ==
The film has music and background score composed by G. V. Prakash Kumar. The audio rights were acquired by Mudway Records, a new label established by the production house with Divo as the digital partner. The first single titled "Mandaadi Mandaadi" was released on 18 July 2026. The second single "Usure Needhan Pulla" was released on 14 August 2026. The pre-release audio launch event was held on 28 August 2026 at Chennai Trade Centre, Chennai. The entire album consisting of 5 tracks was released on 28 August 2026.

Track listing
No.	Title	Lyrics	Singer(s)	Length
1.	"Kai Valavi Kulunga"	Jayashree Mathimaran	Sathyan Mahalingam, Suganthi	3:44
2.	"Usure Needhan Pulla"	Jayashree Mathimaran	Kapil Kapilan, Sanjana Kalmanje	3:45
3.	"Mandaadi Mandaadi"	Vaheesan Rasaiya	Vaaheesan Rasaiya, V. M. Mahalingam	3:39
4.	"Oli Vattam"	Vedan	Vedan, Ritual	2:10
5.	"Neer Porkalam"	Pa. Vijay	Yogi Sekar	4:20
Total length:				17:38

== Release ==
=== Theatrical ===
Mandaadi was released on 10 September 2026, coinciding with the Vinayagar Chaturthi weekend along with Sardar 2. The film was initially scheduled to release on 4 September 2026 but was pushed by a week. It was released in Dolby Cinema, IMAX, EPIQ and standard formats. In late August, after the Tamil Film Producers Council (TFPC) and the Tamil Film Active Producers Association (TFAPA), due to a dispute with film distributors and exhibitors, announced that Tamil films cannot release or complete filming or post-production works from 1 September 2026 onwards, the film's theatrical release was facing uncertainty. However, a week later, the decision was reversed, allowing Mandaadi to release as planned.

=== Distribution ===
The distribution rights of Tamil Nadu were acquired by Red Giant Movies. In Andhra Pradesh and Telangana they were acquired by Mythri Movie Distributors. 3 Dot Movies acquired the theatrical distribution rights for Malaysia and Singapore, while Friday Entertainment did so for France.

=== Home media ===
The film began streaming on Netflix from 8 October 2026.

== Reception ==
=== Critical response ===
Bhuvanesh Chandar of The Hindu described the film as an engaging and smooth-sailing sports action drama, praising the performances of Soori and Suhas and the way the film handles its sporting elements. Yashaswini Sri of The Indian Express praised Soori and Suhas for their performances in the water-based sequences, but felt that the film lost momentum during its portions set on land.

Latha Srinivasan of NDTV gave the film 3.5 out of 5 stars and praised Soori's performance, describing Mandaadi as an engaging coastal sports drama. Roopa Radhakrishnan of The Times of India rated the film 3 out of 5, describing it as an uneven journey that ultimately builds towards a strong finish.

Prathyush Parasuraman of The Hollywood Reporter India praised Soori's charisma but criticised the film's predictable storyline. Akshay Kumar of Cinema Express gave a favourable assessment, praising the film's sailing sequences while noting some turbulence in its narrative.

=== Box office ===
Mandaadi grossed ₹6.55 crore worldwide on its opening day, including ₹5.55 crore from India and ₹1 crore from overseas. The film recorded this opening despite having fewer shows in Tamil Nadu than Sardar 2. The film grossed more than ₹100 crore worldwide after 10 days of release. The film grossed a total of around ₹133.82–150 crore, with ₹100 crore from Tamil Nadu alone and ₹50 crore from overseas markets.
