= Kavalai Vendam =

2016 Indian film by Deekay

- Theatrical release poster
- Directed by: Deekay
- Written by: Deekay
- Produced by: Elred Kumar
- Starring: Jiiva; Kajal Aggarwal; Bobby Simha; Sunaina
- Cinematography: Abinandhan Ramanujam
- Edited by: T. S. Suresh
- Music by: Leon James
- Production company: RS Infotainment
- Distributed by: Abi & Abi Pictures
- Release date: 24 November 2016
- Running time: 138 minutes
- Country: India
- Language: Tamil

Kavalai Vendam (transl. No need of Worry) is a 2016 Indian Tamil-language romantic comedy film written and directed by Deekay. The film stars Jiiva and Kajal Aggarwal, while Bobby Simha and Sunaina play supporting roles.

The film, which is said to be an urban romance "about first love, second chances and relationships", features music composed by Leon James, cinematography by Abinandhan Ramanujam and editing by Suresh. Produced by Elred Kumar, Kavalai Vendam released on 24 November 2016 while its dubbed Telugu version Entha Varaku Ee Prema released on 7 April 2017 to mixed reviews and did average collections. The film later gained further recognition after being published on OTT, noting it for its comedy.

== Plot ==
Aravind is a flirtatious chef who runs a restaurant in Coonoor, a picturesque hill station. He is known for his playful personality and carefree attitude toward love and life. He spends most of his time joking around with his close friends, Natty and Sathish, living by the motto: “Kavalai Vendam” (don’t worry).

However, beneath his easygoing nature lies a complicated past involving his ex-wife Divya, the woman he once truly loved. Years earlier, Aravind and Divya were childhood friends who eventually fell in love and got married. However, their marriage was far from smooth, as Aravind’s immaturity and Divya’s strong-headed personality often clashed.

One day, when Aravind’s mother scolded Divya harshly, Aravind did not stand up for her, which deeply hurt Divya. Feeling neglected and unsupported, she walked out of the marriage abruptly, without giving him a chance to explain. The two then separated and lost contact.

Years later, in the present, Divya reenters Aravind’s life unexpectedly. She is now living with her new boyfriend, Arjun, and is about to get remarried. However, she needs Aravind’s signature on their divorce papers to finalize the process. When she comes to Coonoor to meet him, Aravind is stunned; the feelings he had for her still linger. Instead of signing the papers immediately, Aravind cleverly refuses, using the opportunity to win her back. He insists she stay with him for a few days so that they can “reconnect” before he decides.

Forced to live together again, Divya and Aravind’s life becomes a comical battlefield. They bicker constantly over petty issues. Aravind’s mother encourages them to reconcile, while his friends tease him for still being hung up on Divya. Divya tries to remain distant and practical, but old memories resurface, both sweet and painful. Despite the chaos, their chemistry is undeniable. Aravind tries various ways to remind Divya of their past love: cooking for her, making her laugh, and helping her when she falls sick. Meanwhile, Deepa, a friendly woman who has a crush on Aravind, enters the picture. Her presence triggers jealousy in Divya, even though she refuses to admit she still has feelings for him.

As time passes, Aravind begins to mature. He realizes that love isn’t just about fun and passion; it’s about understanding, support, and compromise. Divya, too, begins to notice this change in him and questions whether ending the marriage was truly what she wanted. However, misunderstandings soon arise again when Aravind’s playful flirting causes confusion, and Divya, feeling hurt, decides to leave once more, convinced that he hasn’t changed at all.

When Divya is about to leave for good and marry Arjun, Aravind finally opens up and confesses his genuine feelings for her. He admits that he was immature before, but has learned from their time apart. He tells her that despite everything, he still loves her deeply and doesn’t want to lose her again. This heartfelt confession moves Divya, who realizes she also still loves him. She calls off her marriage to Arjun.

The film concludes on a happy, comedic note with Divya and Aravind reconciling and starting over, choosing to rebuild their relationship from scratch. Aravind’s motto “Kavalai Vendam” now takes on a new meaning: not careless indifference, but a positive, worry-free approach to life and love.

== Cast ==
- Jiiva as Aravind Bhaskar
- Kajal Aggarwal as Divya Priyadarshini
- Bobby Simha as Arjun
- Sunaina as Deepa
- Shruthi Ramakrishnan as Shilpa/Sundaram
- RJ Balaji as 'Natty' Nataraj
- Bala Saravanan as Sathish
- Mayilsamy as Dr. Bhaskar ("Busy Kai" Bhaskar), Aravind's father
- Madhumitha as Shankari, Aravind's stepmother
- Manthra as Divya's mother
- Sriranjani as Arjun's mother
- Manobala as Pattai Babu
- Jyothi Lakshmi as Maya Aunty
- Rahul Thatha
- Kutty Gopi
- Rail Ravi
- Yashika Aannand as Swimming Instructor (Cameo Appearance)
- Daniel Annie Pope as Black Thangappa (Cameo Appearance)
- VJ Adams as Delivery Boy (Cameo Appearance)
- Devipriya as Registrar's Wife (Cameo Appearance)

== Production ==
Following the success of their first collaboration Yaamirukka Bayamey (2014), producer Elred Kumar announced in June 2014 that he had signed on Deekay to make his second film for RS Infotainment. He revealed that the film would also be a "comedy" but a different genre from their earlier horror-comedy film In January 2015, Jiiva and Bobby Simha were reported to be playing the lead roles, with a press release in March 2015 confirming that Jiiva would play the lead role and that Simha would play an extended guest role. Titled Kavalai Vendam, Elred Kumar stated that he would retain music composer S. N. Prasad from their previous film, while bringing in cinematographer Mukesh and editor Ruben. Keerthy Suresh signed on to play the leading female role in March 2015, while Nikki Galrani was added to the cast thereafter for another lead role. A photo shoot featuring Jiiva and Keerthy Suresh was held in June 2015, with promotional stills released to indicate the start of the production phase. However, the film was later postponed and the first schedule was pushed back by six months. The change of dates meant that Keerthy Suresh could not accommodate the film into her schedule, and she was subsequently replaced by Kajal Aggarwal during August 2015. Pre-production works for the film was reported to be back underway in December 2015, with comedians RJ Balaji, Bala Saravanan and Mayilswamy added to the cast. The delays also meant that Nikki Galrani quit the project after committing to work on other films during the period.

The film began its schedule in Coonoor during mid-January 2016, with further changes made to the crew of the film. A press release revealed that Leon James had been brought in to compose the film's soundtrack, while Abinandhan Ramanujam was signed as the cinematographer. Actresses Sunaina and Shruthi Ramakrishnan also joined the team during the first schedule, with Sunaina revealing that she would portray a character who is in love with Jiiva's character. The team shot for a month in Coonoor and Kotagiri, often working for up to fifteen hours a day and by the end of the schedule, Deekay revealed that the film was "sixty percent" complete. The second schedule of the film, initially scheduled for March, was delayed as a result of the 2016 Tamil Nadu elections and as a result, the team restarted work in June 2016 with a song sequence shot in Kotagiri. Further scenes including the climax was shot in Ooty during early July 2016, before the team moved to Chennai to film more scenes. Another song featuring Jiiva and Kajal Aggarwal was shot in Mahabalipuram and on locations on the East Coast Road during the same month, with the makers revealing that the film was "eighty percent" complete.

== Soundtrack ==
Kavalai Vendam

Soundtrack album by Leon James
- Released: 17 October 2016
- Recorded: 2016
- Genre: Feature film soundtrack
- Length: 15:47
- Label: Sony Music India
- Producer: Leon James

Leon James chronology
Ko 2 (2015)	Kavalai Vendam (2016)	Veera (2018)

The film's score and soundtrack is composed by Leon James, with the four songs written by Ko. Sesha. Two singles released prior to the release of the full album; "Un Kadhal Irundhal Pothum" by Armaan Malik and Shashaa Tirupati was released on 17 August 2016, while "En Pulse Yethitu Poriye" featuring vocals from Inno Genga, Andrea Jeremiah, Dinesh Kanagaratnam and Leon James was released on 2 September 2016. The full album released on 17 October 2016, with a further song titled "Nee Tholaindhaayo" by Sid Sriram and a reprise of "Un Kadhal Irundhal Podhum" by Vandana Srinivasan unveiled. Upon release, the album won largely positive reviews from critics. The dubbed Telugu version of the audio was released in late October 2016 with a music launch event.

Tracklist
No.	Title	Singer(s)	Length
1.	"Un Kaadhal Irundhal Podhum"	Armaan Malik, Shashaa Tirupati	4:31
2.	"En Pulse Yethitu Poriye"	Leon James, Inno Genga, Andrea Jeremiah, Dinesh Kanagaratnam	3:59
3.	"Nee Tholaindhaayo"	Sid Sriram	3:42
4.	"Un Kaadhal Irundhal Podhum Reprise"	Vandana Srinivasan	3:23
Total length:			15:35

== Release ==
In August 2016, Elred Kumar announced that the film would release on 7 October 2016 coinciding with the Ayudha Puja holidays in India, but the team consequently chose to postpone the project to avoid competition with other films. During the period, distributor Abinesh Elangovan also purchased the Indian theatrical rights of the film to release through his studio, Abi & Abi Pictures. D. Venkatesh of DV Cine Creations bought the Telugu dubbing rights of the film and subsequently prepared the Telugu version titled Entha Varaku Ee Prema. Subsequently, in mid-November, Elred Kumar announced a new release date of 24 November and the film began promotional work, with a second teaser trailer being released.

== Reception ==
M. Suganth of The Times of India rated the film two-and-a-half out of five stars and wrote, "Abinandhan Ramanujam does a fab job in capturing the misty locales of Coonoor while composer Leon James tries to inject liveliness into the scenes with his bouncy score, and RJ Balaji, for his part, keeps cracking one-liners. But, half the time, it doesn’t help because the narrative lacks focus and the tone becomes jerky. This is perhaps why the jokes are scattershot." Srivatsan of India Today gave it one-and-a-half out of five stars and wrote, "Kavalai Vendam has nothing to offer, or to put it better, the aforementioned actors fail to fit in this film."

Sreedhar Pillai of Firstpost gave the film two-and-a-half out of five stars and wrote, "If double entendre and crude gags are your idea of entertainment then the typical Tamil comedy Kavalai Vendam might just do the trick." Manoj Kumar R. of The Indian Express gave it half a star out of five and wrote, "Kavalai Vendam is a case study for how to make a regressive film in romantic-comedy genre".

Anupama Subramanian of Deccan Chronicle wrote, "Though one does not expect logic from such comedies, the problem with KV is the inconsistent screenplay by Deekay. And we don’t empathize with the lead pair (as it should have been) even as they go through some serious situations." Vishal Menon of The Hindu wrote, "Barring a few scattered moments of laughter, Kavalai Vendam’s just a repeat of last week’s disappointing Kadavul Irukaan Kumaru."
