= Singam Puli =

- Theatrical release poster
- Directed by: Sai Ramani
- Written by: Sai Ramani
- Produced by: S. Parthiban; S. Srinivasan
- Starring: Jiiva; Divya Spandana; Honey Rose
- Cinematography: Balasubramaniem
- Edited by: V. Jaishankar
- Music by: Mani Sharma
- Production company: Silverline Film Factory
- Release date: 4 March 2011
- Running time: 163 minutes
- Country: India
- Language: Tamil

Singam Puli (transl. Lion, Tiger) is a 2011 Indian Tamil-language action film written and directed by Sai Ramani in his debut. It stars Jiiva in dual roles as the hero and villain, co-starring Divya Spandana, Honey Rose and Santhanam. With its release delayed multiple times, the film saw a theatrical release on 4 March 2011. It was dubbed in Telugu as Simham Puli.

== Plot ==
The film has a deceptively casual beginning: a middle-class family of parents, a daughter, and identical twin sons, Shiva and Ashok Kumar. Shiva works in a fish market, and Ashok is a lawyer. Shiva is a typical hero who attacks baddies with his bare fists; a rugged man who will brook no injustice. Devout Ashok's goodness is a facade that hides his womanizing nature. Both have romantic interests. Shweta is Shiva's longtime sweetheart, while Ashok's life is one long, lustful journey as he charms every woman he meets into his bed.

Shiva can do nothing right as far as his parents are concerned. They trust Ashok and always misunderstand Shiva's righteous anger, and Shiva's every attempt to show up his Machiavellian twin fails. Ashok, on the other hand, is pally with the local goons and uses his brains to help them in their nefarious activities. Matters come to a head when Ashok lures a girl called Gayatri with pretenses, pretending to be falling in love with her at first, ending up having sex with her, and eventually killing her by pushing her off the terrace when he learns that she becomes pregnant.

Shiva lodges a complaint against Ashok, which fails as he could not prove whether it was him or Ashok who committed the crime due to their faces. Shiva learns that a security guard saw Ashok pushing Gayatri from the roof. He tells the guard to meet him in the evening. However, Ashok kills the guard, as the latter saw him in the evening and thought he was Shiva. Shiva learns this, and a cat-and-mouse game begins between the siblings. This angers Ashok, who tries to kill Shiva and employs a gang to do so. Eventually, Shiva learns of this plot and confronts Ashok. During the fight, Ashok is killed by one of his henchmen. Shiva walks with his father, who for the first time, accepts him.

== Cast ==
- Jiiva as:
  - Shiva
  - Ashok Kumar
- Divya Spandana as Shwetha
- Honey Rose as Gayatri
- Santhanam as Bujji Babu
- Ponvannan as Vedachalam, Shiva's and Ashok's father
- Kuyili as Mutthulakshmi, Shiva's and Ashok's mother
- Pandu as Raghavan, Shwetha's father
- Meera Krishnan as Kamala, Shwetha's mother
- Manikka Vinayagam as Judge
- Cool Suresh as Ashok's friend
- Alex as Bujji Babu's uncle
- Neelu Nasreen as Ramya's mother / Aunty
- Robert in a special appearance in the song "Figaru"

== Production ==
Singam Puli is the directorial debut of Sai Ramani, and the first film to feature Jiiva in two distinct roles.

== Soundtrack ==
All songs were composed by Mani Sharma. The song "Figaru" is based on "Hare Rama" from the Telugu film Okkadu.

Track listing
No.	Title	Lyrics	Singer(s)	Length
1.	"Figaru"	Viveka	Naveen
2.	"Poove Poove"	Viveka	Rahul Nambiar
3.	"Varrale"	Annamalai	Ranjith, Saindhavi
4.	"Kangalal"	Na. Muthukumar	Karthik, Rita
5.	"Ullasame"	Sai Ramani	Ranjith, Janani Madhan
6.	"Naadilla"	Viveka	Mukesh

== Release ==
Singam Puli was completed by late 2010, with the makers initially aiming to release the film for Diwali that year. It was later scheduled to release on 11 February 2011, but was finally released on 4 March 2011.

== Critical reception ==
Sify wrote, "Sai Ramani directed Singam Puli, is an uninspiring 2 hours 45 minutes masala film that takes the viewers for granted. The film is loaded with action, drama, fights, comedy and double meaning dialogues and crass comedy." IANS wrote "Debutant Sai has chosen an advanced theme of fight between twins who represent good and bad. This could have been forgiven if he had worked up a good script to tell this tug-of-war between the brothers". The New Indian Express wrote that Jiiva "could have put in more effort to demarcate the two roles", also criticising the "jerky and inconsistent" narration and loopholes in the script. Malathi Rangarajan of The Hindu wrote, "As the naïve Mr. Right and the murderous Mr. Wrong, Jiiva has done a good job. The real villain of Singam Puli is the long-winding screenplay, which makes you fidgety".
