= Billa II =

2012 Indian film by Chakri Toleti

- Theatrical release poster
- Directed by: Chakri Toleti
- Written by: Chakri Toleti; Sarath Mandava; Eric Felberg; Jaffer Mohammed; Era Murukan
- Produced by: Sunir Kheterpal; Suresh Balaje; George Pius; Chakri Toleti
- Starring: Ajith Kumar; Vidyut Jammwal; Parvathy Omanakuttan; Bruna Abdullah
- Cinematography: R. D. Rajasekhar
- Edited by: Suresh Urs
- Music by: Yuvan Shankar Raja
- Production companies: Wide Angle Creations; IN Entertainment
- Distributed by: Aascar Films (India); GK Media (USA)
- Release date: 13 July 2012 (India)
- Running time: 126 minutes
- Country: India
- Language: Tamil

Billa II is a 2012 Indian Tamil-language action film directed and co-written by Chakri Toleti. A prequel to Billa (2007), it focuses on how David Billa, an ordinary man from the coastal region of Sri Lanka, becomes a dreaded underworld don. The film stars Ajith Kumar reprising the role of the titular character, leading an ensemble cast including Vidyut Jammwal, Parvathy Omanakuttan, Bruna Abdullah, Sudhanshu Pandey, Manoj K. Jayan, Yog Japee, Rohit Khurana, Dinesh Lamba, Krishna Kumar, Sricharan, Janaki Sabesh, Madhusudhan Rao and Rahman. The film's soundtrack and background score were composed by Yuvan Shankar Raja, while R. D. Rajasekhar handled the cinematography and Suresh Urs worked as the editor.

The film, produced by Wide Angle Creations in association with the Hinduja Group company IN Entertainment, was officially announced in November 2010, with Vishnuvardhan as the director. Due to schedule clashes, Vishnuvardhan was replaced by Chakri Toleti, with a new script having been penned by a team involving Toleti, Sarath Mandava and Eric Felberg. Principal photography happened between July 2011 and December 2011. The filming primarily took place at Tamil Nadu, Goa, Hyderabad and in Georgia.

Followed by multiple delays and an extensive marketing campaign, Billa II was released worldwide on 13 July 2012. The film received mixed reviews from critics praising Ajith's performance and technical aspects while criticism was directed towards the script and screenplay.

== Plot ==
David Billa, a Sri Lankan refugee, along with several others, arrives at a camp in Rameswaram, where he befriends Ranjith. Corrupt police inspector Raghubir Sinha constantly terrorizes the camp. Billa attacks Raghubir when he tries to forcefully detain one of his friends and, in return, gets tortured in a police cell. Billa vows to make Raghubir suffer. He goes to meet his widowed sister in Chennai as she is his sole living relative, but is shunned by her due to his criminal past in Lanka. A few days later, Billa and Ranjith are hired to transport fish from Rameswaram to Chennai, which is Raghubir's plan to trap them as the truck they are driving contains diamonds. Police intercept them to arrest them, but Billa realises the ploy and kills all the cops. Despite Ranjith advising them to flee with the diamonds, Billa drives the truck to its destination, where they meet hotel owner Selvaraj. Raghubir's ally Mustafa Bai arrives minutes later and tells him that Billa has escaped with the Diamonds. Selvaraj realises the ploy and kills Bhai. Selvaraj is pleased with Billa's loyalty and employs him and Ranjith in his illegal business. Days later, Billa murders Raghubir in a brothel and also kills an egoistic immigration officer who had insulted him earlier.

Months later, Selvaraj's relative, Goan drug dealer Kotiswara Rao, visits Selvaraj and asks for help in selling off the heroin he had brought along with him. Selvaraj refuses, but Billa volunteers to sell it off and tries to deal the heroin with a local thug who refuses to pay for it in return. In a brutal scuffle that ensues where one of Billa's friends is slaughtered, Billa kills them all and goes directly to Koti's boss, Abbasi, in Panaji with both the money and the heroin, who is very impressed and recruits him. Abbasi is a drug cartel leader and the boss of the biggest drug cartel in Goa. He is in business with a powerful and dreaded Russian arms dealer, Dimitri.

When Billa and Ranjith retrieve Dimitri's arms consignment held by the Indian coastal guard, they enter his good books. Billa quickly climbs the ladder of Abbasi's gang. He learns of his elder sister's death and brings his niece Jasmine with him. He provides her with a big house and servants and enrolls her in a medical college. Billa and Koti travel to Russia to meet Dimitri, who owns a large arms and ammunition manufacturing unit. Billa meets a corrupt Interpol officer, Jagdish, at Dimitri's mansion and is astonished by the functioning of the mafia and its international network. Billa signs a larger deal with Dimitri without Abbasi's knowledge. At the same time, Dimitri kills Bobby, Abbasi's henchman who comes with Koti and Billa as a translator. Dimitri and Jagdish then reveal that Bobby is actually an Interpol spy who was really betraying Abbasi's gang. After returning to Panaji, Koti misleads Abbasi as Billa kills Bobby and directly starts business with Dimitri, creating rivalry between Billa and Abbasi. Tensions further increase when Billa beats up Satish Kumar, son of influential minister Praveen Kumar, when he tries to misbehave with Jasmine at a party. Abbasi expresses his discontent and vents at him. Billa, surprised and enraged at his ingratitude, walks away with Ranjith and two others. Billa, Ranjith, and ally Ram plot to venture into the drug business on their own during the carnival. At the carnival, Billa is betrayed by Ram and is brutally attacked. However, he survives and kills the assailants, Abbasi and Ram, eventually becoming Goa's most powerful gangster. He begins a relationship with Abbasi's girlfriend, Sameera.

Dimitri arrives in Goa and finds himself in a fallout with Billa when they try to re-negotiate a deal. Dimitri thereafter seeks to oust him, with the help of Koti, Satish, and Praveen. They proceed to assassinate Chief Minister Mohan Kanth, and the blame falls on Billa. However, Billa is freed by Ranjith, who threatens the judge and his family. Billa rescues Jasmine from Koti's men and informs Sameera to take Jasmine to safety. However, Sameera betrays Billa and informs the minister's son, who holds Billa and Jasmine captive. Billa is held to the ground and mocked by Satish, who slits Jasmine's throat. Enraged at her death, Billa overpowers and kills everyone.

Meanwhile, in Russia, Dimitri meets with the African warlords, and Koti is present with him. He shows his factory on his computer via a series of webcams, and much to everyone's shock, Billa is seen destroying the factory. He also sees his consignment train go off course. He becomes angry, kills Koti for not killing Billa, and sets out to finish the task. The arms factory is destroyed by Billa, Ranjith, and their men. Dimitri arrives and follows his delivery train; to his shock, the train is blown by Billa, who is waiting for him on his own helicopter. After an intense battle, Billa throws Dimitri off the flying helicopter. In the epilogue, Billa and Ranjith board a plane out of the country. Sameera, Police Officer R. K. De Silva, Billa's lawyer, and Praveen are killed by Billa's assassins.

== Cast ==
- Ajith Kumar as David Billa / Ranga "Rangayya"
- Vidyut Jammwal as Dimitri
- Parvathy Omanakuttan as Jasmine
- Yog Japee as Ranjith
- Yogesh as Billa's left-hand man and henchman/assistant
- Bruna Abdullah as Sameera
- Sudhanshu Pandey as Abbasi
- Manoj K. Jayan as Kotiswara Rao "Koti"
- Ilavarasu as Selvaraj
- Sricharan as Bobby
- Sriman as Billa's lawyer
- Madhusudhan Rao as Chief Minister Mohan Kanth
- Dinesh Lamba as Minister Praveen Kumar
- Rohit Khurana as Satish Kumar
- Sarath Mandava as Ram
- Janaki Sabesh as Billa's sister
- Krishna Kumar as Inspector Raghubir Sinha
- Theepetti Ganesan as Muthu
- Ashok Bentwal
- Rahman as Jagadish (cameo, reprising his role from Billa)
- Byron Gibson as Russian Mafia Boss
- Ron Smoorenburg as Russian Martial Artist
- Balaji Shathivel as Billa's henchman
- Yuvan Shankar Raja in a special appearance
- Meenakshi Dixit special appearance in the item number "Madurai Ponnu"
- Nicole Amy Madell special appearance in the item number "Yedho Mayakkam" and "Gangster"
- Gabriela Bertante special appearance in the item number "Yedho Mayakkam"
- Ashok Selvan as young Billa in photograph (uncredited role)

== Production ==
=== Development ===
In 2010, it was confirmed that Vishnuvardhan, the director of Billa (2007), had finished penning the script for a prequel, which would star Ajith Kumar as the title character again, and would commence in 2011. The project was officially announced in late 2010, after Ajith Kumar signed up to the prequel and first production poster were published to the media. Further details were disclosed, with Suresh Balaje, son of producer and actor K. Balaji, who produced the original Billa with Rajinikanth, and George Pius from Wide Angle Creations banner, being confirmed as the producer, who would associate with Mumbai-based IN Entertainment Limited, a Hinduja group company. The entire production team of the Billa remake, including cinematographer Nirav Shah, editor A. Sreekar Prasad and music director Yuvan Shankar Raja, were announced to be retained for the prequel.

In a turn of events, Vishnuvardhan opted out of the project since his dates clashed with the making of his Telugu film, Panjaa (earlier titled as The Shadow). Chakri Toleti, who previously directed the 2009 film Unnaipol Oruvan, was subsequently signed on by the producers to direct the venture. In May 2011, Toleti held his first press conference stating that production would begin in late June 2011 and revealing that "Billa 2 would focus on how David, an ordinary man from the coastal Thoothukudi in South Tamil Nadu, becomes Billa, a dreaded underworld don". David's character was afterwards widely reported to be either a refugee from Tamil Eelam or a Tamilian from Sri Lanka. Both the director and the producer refused to confirm the statements, disclosing only that the film would depict David's journey over a period of five years.

With Vishnuvardhan's exit from the project, his script was also scrapped, and Toleti, along with Ajith Kumar, began penning a new script for the prequel. Yuvan Shankar Raja only was retained from the original production team, with the rest of the technical crew being finalised in the following weeks. Hemant Chaturvedi, who hitherto had worked in Bollywood productions only, was signed on to replace Nirav Shah as the cinematographer after the latter's schedules clashed with the making of his other film, Vettai. However, in July 2011, Hemant Chaturvedi too moved out of the project, fearing that the delay in commencement of Billa 2 may hurt his chances in Bollywood, and R. D. Rajasekhar was appointed as the new cinematographer. V. Selvakumar who had notably worked in Madrasapattinam was selected as the art director. The crew also announced that the film would become the first Indian production to be filmed with a RED EPIC Camera, being shot at 5K resolution. Writer Ee. Raa. Murugan, who had previously collaborated with Chakri Toleti in Unnaipol Oruvan, was appointed to write the dialogues.

=== Casting ===
From the previous film, the producers made it clear that apart from Ajith Kumar, and Rahman, most of the other characters would not be retained. The female lead role was expected to be handed to Anushka Shetty, but despite media speculation she was not signed on. The female lead role was handed to debutant Huma Qureshi, a Mumbai-based theatre actor who had previously been featured in commercials, with Toleti finalising Qureshi after a nationwide search for an actress. However, she was removed from the project by September 2011, due to date clashes, and became replaced by Miss India World 2008 Parvathy Omanakuttan later that month, who the director had spotted and offered the role of Jasmine at a fashion show. Parvathy described her character as a "simple girl who transforms into a modern person" and that Billa looks up to, adding that she had more scenes in the "emotional part" of the film. Bollywood actress and model Bruna Abdullah was selected to portray another significant character, which she went on term as "super powerful, very strong and sexy". Besides models Abdullah, and Parvathy Omanakuttan, Meenakshi Dixit was recruited for the item number "Madurai Ponnu". Another three models including, Gabriela Bertante, Nicole Amy Madell, and an unknown artist, was recruited to perform a dance number "Yedho Mayakkam".

Television actor Krishna Kumar, was signed on to play a "dirty cop". In June 2011, Sudhanshu Pandey, a former model who had appeared in several Hindi films, was given the role of a "greying ganglord", who becomes the mentor to the young David, while Malayalam character actor Manoj K. Jayan was roped in for a "key role". Actress Vimala Raman was signed on to make a special appearance in the film, however she opted out in July 2011 citing schedulig conflicts. Meenakshi Dixit was later finalised for that role and shot her scenes in July 2011 during the first schedule. Vidyut Jamwal, who played negative roles in the Hindi film Force (2011) and the Telugu film Oosaravelli (2011), was selected to play the villain, also making his debut in Tamil cinema. In December 2011 sources revealed that Sricharan, who starred in Payanam, was shooting for a supporting role in the film. Reports in February 2012 suggested that the team was trying to sign Nayantara, who played the female lead in Billa, for a cameo role; the actress refuted the rumours. Furthermore, composer Yuvan Shankar Raja on Toleti's insistence agreed to make a brief appearance in one of the songs.

=== Filming ===
The film's production was delayed as Ajith Kumar's previous film, Mankatha, progressed beyond the anticipated completion dates. In March 2011, the producers released a press note that the film would begin in early May 2011, however this failed to happen. During that period, it was also suggested that Billa II may not be Ajith Kumar's successive project and commence only after the actor completed a film with M. Raja. Eventually, a photo shoot was held in June 2011 with Ajith sporting an appearance of a man in his mid-twenties. Principal photography commenced on 14 July 2011 at the Ramoji Film City in Hyderabad. Filming during the first 30-day schedule throughout July and August 2011 was held in Hyderabad and Vizag. As part of the schedule, one song was shot in Puducherry under the direction of choreographer Raju Sundaram. Both actresses Parvathy Omanakuttan and Bruna Abdullah joined the crew for the second schedule in Goa, that lasted for 39 days and ended in the first week of November. While filming an action sequence in this schedule, Ajith had injured his hands while smashing bottle in a stuntman's head and the bottle broke into pieces in his hands. However, he had completed the shot, despite the injuries.

In the third week of November, a unit of thirty-six members left for Georgia in Eastern Europe for the final 20-day schedule of the film. In Georgia, the crew filmed at the country's capital, Tbilisi, Borjomi and Rustavi. Billa II became the first Indian film to be shot at the Likani Palace, which functions as a summer residence of the President of Georgia. Midway through the filming, heavy snowfall began. The crew, however, carried on shooting and later reshot the complete sequence with the snowy background to maintain the continuity. The climax portions were also filmed there against a snowy backdrop, for which aerial shots were done from a helicopter. Approximately half a million dollars were spent for the whole schedule in Georgia, which was finished by mid-December. In February 2012, the remaining scenes, including the film's title song, were canned at the Ramoji Film City in Hyderabad, despite the ongoing strike in the film industry. An item number "Yedo Mayakkam" featuring three models was shot in a studio in Goa. The entire filming was completed over a period of 90 days.

Three stunt choreographers were involved in the making of Billa II. The stunt sequences in Georgia were partly choreographed by an award-winning German-based company led by stuntman Stefan Richter, while the climax action scenes were done by Kecha Khamphakdee's Jaika Stunt team. K. Rajasekhar choreographed the fight sequences in Hyderabad and Goa. Madhu Sudhanan, a VFX creative director, said that VFX had been used in action sequences, in "set extensions" and in sequences involving 3D.

== Soundtrack ==
Yuvan Shankar Raja, who had also worked on the score of Billa (2007), composed the soundtrack and score of Billa II, becoming his fifth project starring Ajith Kumar. The album consists of six tracks: five songs and a theme music track, along with an additional song composed for a belly dance sequence, albeit not included in the film. The lyrics for the songs were written by Na. Muthukumar. Following multiple delays, the album was eventually released to the market by Sony Music India on 1 May 2012 coinciding with Ajith's birthday.

== Marketing ==
Billa II underwent an extensive marketing spree before its release. A first teaser poster displaying the new logo design was published in Diwali 2011, while the first posters depicting Ajith Kumar's look were released in January 2012 during the Pongal festival. From late February onwards, further posters featuring Ajith were unveiled, with one poster in late March portraying a young Ajith carrying a kerosene can on a boat that led to speculations over the character's origin. On 13 April 2012, a one-minute teaser trailer was uploaded to YouTube. The teaser garnered over 500,000 views within the first three days of its release, setting a new record for Tamil films.

As part of the marketing, the makers planned to release a Billa 2 calendar featuring the two lead actresses, Parvathy Omanakuttan and Bruna Abdulla; the stills were shot exclusively for the calendar in Goa. An event to launch the official theatrical trailer was planned to be held on 2 July at the Anna Centenary Library auditorium in Kotturpuram, Chennai. The entire cast and crew along with Russian dancers were expected to attend the function, which was to be telecast on television later. The event was cancelled at short notice. The trailer was however uploaded to YouTube the same day, gaining record views. Moreover, a promotional video featuring Ajith with composer Yuvan Shankar Raja was shot as well, but was not released either. A video game based on the film was launched at the Sathyam Cinemas, preceded by Abdulla. A day before its release, the entire cast and crew of Billa II, excluding Ajith and Yuvan attended a press interaction in a star hotel in Chennai.

== Release ==
=== Theatrical ===
Billa II was initially planned to release on 13 April 2012 coinciding with Tamil New Year. Later, the release was postponed to 1 May 2012, coinciding with Ajith Kumar's 41st birthday, with the makers considering to bring forward the film by four days to release it on a Friday. However, due to the strike in the film industry, the film's release became further delayed and was pushed to the second half of May 2012. After considering the first four Fridays in June 2012 for the film's release, the team had planned to release the film on 22 June. It was again delayed a week later, to avoid clash with Karthi's Saguni which released on the same weekend. However, Sunir Kheterpal announced that the censorship process was the reason for the delay, and claimed he could not announce the release date until the censor certificate has been received. The makers finally zeroed in on 13 July as the release date.

=== Screenings and statistics ===
Billa 2 was released across over 2,500 screens worldwide, making it as the largest Tamil releases ever. In Tamil Nadu, the film opened in 550 screens with the first show beginning at 4:00 a.m. At the Mayajaal multiplex, the film opened in 102 shows across 14 screens, the highest single day release at the multiplex.

The film was released simultaneously in the four southern states, Tamil Nadu, Karnataka, Andhra Pradesh and Kerala as well as in North India and international markets. A dubbed Telugu version of the film released in Andhra Pradesh as David Billa. In Kerala, the Tamil version was screened and Karnataka saw the release of both the versions. The film was also released by Aanna Films in most of the major multiplexes in France with French subtitles. in Malaysia, North India and the Gulf Nations, Malay, Hindi and Arabic subtitles were added to the film, respectively, while in other international markets, it was screened with English subtitles. In the United States, the film premiered in 34 screens in 28 states on 12 July and had a wide release in 59 states, the following day.

=== Distribution ===
The overseas distribution rights were sold for ₹5.3 crore (equivalent to ₹11 crore or US$1.1 million in 2026) to the US-based company GK Media, the highest ever for an Ajith film. Three prominent production houses were reportedly trying to purchase the domestical theatrical rights, until V. Ravichandran's Aascar Films eventually acquired the theatrical distribution rights of Tamil Nadu for ₹26 crore (equivalent to ₹53 crore or US$5.6 million in 2026). All the distribution rights of the film, except the Kerala and Hindi dubbing rights had been sold at a record price of more than ₹40 crore (equivalent to ₹82 crore or US$8.5 million in 2026), making Billa II one of the top pre-release revenue generating films of all time in the Tamil film industry. In early May 2012, the Kerala release rights were finally sold to Sagara Entertainment and Money Tree Entertainment for ₹8 crore (equivalent to ₹16 crore or US$1.7 million in 2026), likewise a new record for an Ajith film.

=== Censorship ===
Billa II received an adult rating ("A" certificate) from the Central Board of Film Certification; according to the director, this was achieved without any major cuts, while producer Sunir Kheterpal said that the censorship process was not yet complete, and commented on his reluctance to compromise. The certification was ultimately not changed. In the United Kingdom, the film received an uncut 15 classification from the BBFC (British Board of Film Classification), for ‘strong bloody violence and revenge theme’.

=== Home media ===
In March 2012, Sun TV bought the satellite rights for a record price, with sources estimating the price at ₹6.5 crore (equivalent to ₹13 crore or US$1.4 million in 2026).

== Reception ==
=== Critical reception ===
Billa 2 mainly received mixed reviews from critics and audience, with praise on cast's performances, Yuvan's music and cinematography, while the film's pace, screenplay and direction received criticism. Karthik Subramanian of The Hindu said, "Where the movie lacks in substance, it does try to score with technical aspects. The camerawork by R. D. Rajasekhar, background score by Yuvan Shankar Raja and editing by Suresh Urs are superlative for the most part", and that the film "does live up to the hype". MSN India said "'Billa 2' would be an interesting film only if you are an ardent fan of Ajith. Otherwise, it is an average film with a weak script spoiling the show."

Meena Iyer of The Times of India recommended it with a 3 star rating, "If you're a Ajith fan—Billa 2 is a must. If you're an action aficionado, it's a treat. If you're neither, then don't bother." Prathibha Parameswaran of IBN Live said, "If you liked Billa and Mankatha, and expected as much from the prequel, it falls well short of expectations." and further wrote, "watch it only for Thala." Anupama Subramanian of Deccan Chronicle rated the film 3 out of 5 stars and said, "The film works to a great extent because of the sheer screen presence of a star called Ajith Kumar. After all, it is his film all the way!"

Sify wrote: "Don't go in expecting too much, perhaps you won't be too disappointed. Watch Billa-2 for its stylish presentation, it hasn’t got anything else to offer." NDTV-based critic wrote "Billa 2 can be watched for its action sequences, decent music and interesting locations." Pavithra Srinivasan of Rediff.com wrote "Billa 2 is stylishly shot, and Ajith carries the film on his shoulders, but that's all there is to it. When it comes to screenplay, logical plots and characterisation, it fails to meet expectations." Malini Mannath of The New Indian Express wrote "Neither is the film an image booster for him, nor is he as fascinating to watch as he was in the earlier version. 'Billa 2' has less of style than the earlier one, and not even half its story content."

=== Box office ===
==== India ====
In the domestic market, Billa II had a great opening with 100% occupancy in single screens and multiplexes.In the opening weekend it collected ₹34 crore becoming the best 3-day opening for a Tamil film that time. In the opening week, it grossed around ₹ 4.79 crore at the Chennai box office, and after 5 weeks, it amounted to ₹ 77.9 million after tax deduction. It grossed around 410 million at Tamil Nadu, 24 million at Kerala, 21 million at Karnataka, 20 million at Andhra and 10 million at rest of India. The film did not get exemption from entertainment tax due to A certificate. It yielded ₹ 7 crore or 10 per cent of the total entertainment tax revenue of the year for the exchequer.

==== Overseas ====
In Malaysia, Billa II collected US$348,000 The film grossed $78,000 in the UK and approximately $20,000 in Australia.

== Awards and nominations ==
Award (Note: Awards, festivals and organisations are in alphabetical order.)	Date of ceremony (Note: Date is linked to the article about the awards held that year, wherever possible.)	Category	Recipient(s) and nominee(s)	Result	Ref.
The Chennai Times Film Awards	4 November 2013	Best Actor	Ajith Kumar	Nominated	
The Chennai Times Film Awards	4 November 2013	Best Actor in a Negative Role	Vidyut Jammwal (Note: also for Thuppakki)	Nominated	
Mirchi Music Awards South	26 August 2013	Female Vocalist of the Year	Shweta Pandit for "Idhayam"	Nominated	
Mirchi Music Awards South	26 August 2013	Technical – Sound Mixing of the Year	Kausikan Sivalingam and Ozrur Ikinci for "Gangster"	Won	
South Indian International Movie Awards	12–13 September 2013	Best Actor in a Negative Role – Tamil	Sudhanshu Pandey	Nominated	
Vijay Awards	11 May 2013	Best Female Playback Singer	Shweta Pandit for "Idhayam"	Nominated	
Vijay Awards	11 May 2013	Vijay Award for Favourite Hero	Ajith Kumar	Nominated	
