= Sarath Mandava =

Indian screenwriter, director, cinematographer and executive producer

- Born: Sarath Babu Mandava; Ongole, Andhra Pradesh, India
- Education: ITM University, Southern New Hampshire University
- Occupations: director writer executive producer cinematographer
- Years active: 2009 – present

Sarath Mandava is an Indian screenwriter, director, cinematographer and executive producer known for his works in Tamil cinema, and Telugu cinema. In 2012, he has co-written Ajith Kumar's Billa II. Sarath made his directorial debut with a political thriller Tamil version film Ko 2.

== Filmography ==
=== As film director ===
Year	Title	Language	Notes	Ref.
2016	Ko 2	Tamil		
2022	Ramarao on Duty	Telugu		

=== Other crew positions ===
Year	Title	Language	Credited as			Notes	Ref.
Year	Title	Language	Writer	Producer	Cinematographer	Notes	Ref.
2010	Broker	Telugu	No	No	Yes		
2012	Billa II	Tamil	Yes	No	No	Also dialogue writer for Telugu dubbed version	
2013	Potugadu	Telugu	No	Executive	No		
2016	Tulasi Dalam	Telugu	No	No	Yes		
2019	Khamoshi	Hindi	Dialogues	No	No		

=== As an actor ===
- Unnaipol Oruvan (2009)
- Billa II (2012)
