= Jiiva =

Indian actor

- Jiiva in 2014
- Born: Amar Choudhary; 4 January 1984 (age 42); Madras, Tamil Nadu, India
- Occupations: Actor; film producer; Host
- Years active: 1991, 2003–present
- Spouse: Supriya (m. 2007)
- Children: 1
- Father: R. B. Choudary
- Family: Jithan Ramesh (Brother)
- Honours: Kalaimamani (2006)

Amar Choudary (born 4 January 1984), known professionally as Jiiva, is an Indian actor and film producer who works in Tamil cinema. He is the youngest son of the late film producer R. B. Choudary.

He began his career as a child actor in 1991 in films produced by his father. He made his debut as a lead actor in his father's 50th production, Aasai Aasaiyai (2003). After Sivaji Ganesan, Jiiva is the only Tamil actor to have been awarded at the Cyprus International Film Festival, particularly for his performance in Raam (2005).

After this, he has acted in other movies that have been successful, such as E (2006), Katradhu Tamizh (2007), Siva Manasula Sakthi (2009), Ko (2011), Nanban (2012), Mugamoodi (2012), Neethaane En Ponvasantham (2012), Endrendrum Punnagai (2013), Kalakalappu 2 (2018), and Kalathil Santhippom (2021). He made his Hindi cinema debut with the film 83 (2021), in which he portrayed cricketer Krishnamachari Srikkanth. After a series of commercial failures, he made a comeback with the hit film Thalaivar Thambi Thalaimaiyil (2026).

== Early and personal life ==
Jiiva was born as Amar Choudary on 4 January 1984 in Chennai to Rajasthani-origin film producer R. B. Choudary and his Tamil wife Mahjabeen. He is the youngest of four boys; his brothers are Suresh Choudary (co-producer in their home banner, Super Good Films), Jeevan Choudary (entrepreneur of a steel company), and Jithan Ramesh (actor and producer). R. B. Choudary is a noted independent south Indian film producer (Super Good Films) who has been a launchpad for now-famous directors and actors. His wife is a Punjabi.

== Career ==
=== 2003–2008: Debut and breakthrough ===
Jiiva made his debut in his father's production (Super Good Films), Aasai Aasaiyai, directed by Ravi Mariya in 2003. The film performed averagely at the box office, but critics felt that Jiiva left an impression.

His second film Thithikudhe (the Tamil remake of Uday Kiran's Telugu film Manasantha Nuvve), which also released in 2003, was also produced by Super Good Films. The film opened to mixed reviews but the actor gained appreciation for his good looks and expressive emotions. It was his third film, Ameer's crime thriller, Raam (2005) that was called a 'dream break' for his calling in the film industry. The racy screenplay and his role of an eccentric 17-year-old gained positive feedback from audience and critics. The movie was screened at the International Film Festival in Goa and later at the Cyprus International Film Festival, where he won the Best Actor award.

Jiiva next starred in Dishyum (2006), opposite Sandhya of Kaadhal fame. "A feel-good movie for youngsters", reviewed various local publications. "Jeeva continues from this point and has matured as an actor. His acting is impeccable and natural; his emoting, expressions, emotions expressed by looks, body-language – all are perfect," remarked Galatta. The same year, he made his debut as an NSG Commando in Malayalam cinema with Major Ravi's film Keerthi Chakra (2006) starring Mohanlal. The movie had a great opening and was one of the highest-grossing Malayalam films of the year. Jiiva also won the Best Pair Award along with Gopika at Asianet Film Awards. "Jeeva the Tamil actor has a more heroic role which he has done with felicity. The physical energy he imparts to the role has to be seen to be believed," wrote Sify. Later, the movie was dubbed and released in Tamil as Aran. His last movie in 2006 was E, where he portrayed the role of a slum dweller, opposite Nayanthara.The film received positive reviews and was a commercial hit.

The release of Kattradhu Thamizh (2007), which turned out to be a super hit. Jiiva had two more releases after that, Rameswaram in 2007 and Thenavattu in 2008.

=== 2009–2014: Commercial success and critical acclaim ===
Among his releases in the 2000s, Jiiva garnered the most appreciation for portraying various roles that were critically and commercially successful. In 2009, Jiiva experienced major commercial success with Director Rajesh's maiden venture, Siva Manasula Sakthi (2009), opposite Anuya, still hailed as one of the best romantic comedies of all time and has since become a cult rom-com in the Tamil film industry. In 2010, he signed up with Super Good Films for a movie titled Kacheri Arambam, which was described as entertaining, action-packed and comical by various news channels (Behindwoods, Indiaglitz, IANS)

His next film was Singam Puli (2011), where he played dual roles, following which K. V. Anand's political thriller Ko (2011) with Karthika Nair as the lead-role actress and Piaa Bajpai in a supporting role. Rediff stated that his role as Ashwin in Ko was a "cake-walk for Jiiva: he's had a ball with the camera, clicking shots in almost impossible situations and making sure his trademark effervescence is present at all times", while Sify said that "with this performance he was going to be a force to reckon with in Tamil cinema". His next films were Rowthiram (2011), directed by Gokul, and Vandhaan Vendraan (2011) by R. Kannan, released in quick succession. In fact, in Rowthiram, his agility in action sequences is very impressive."

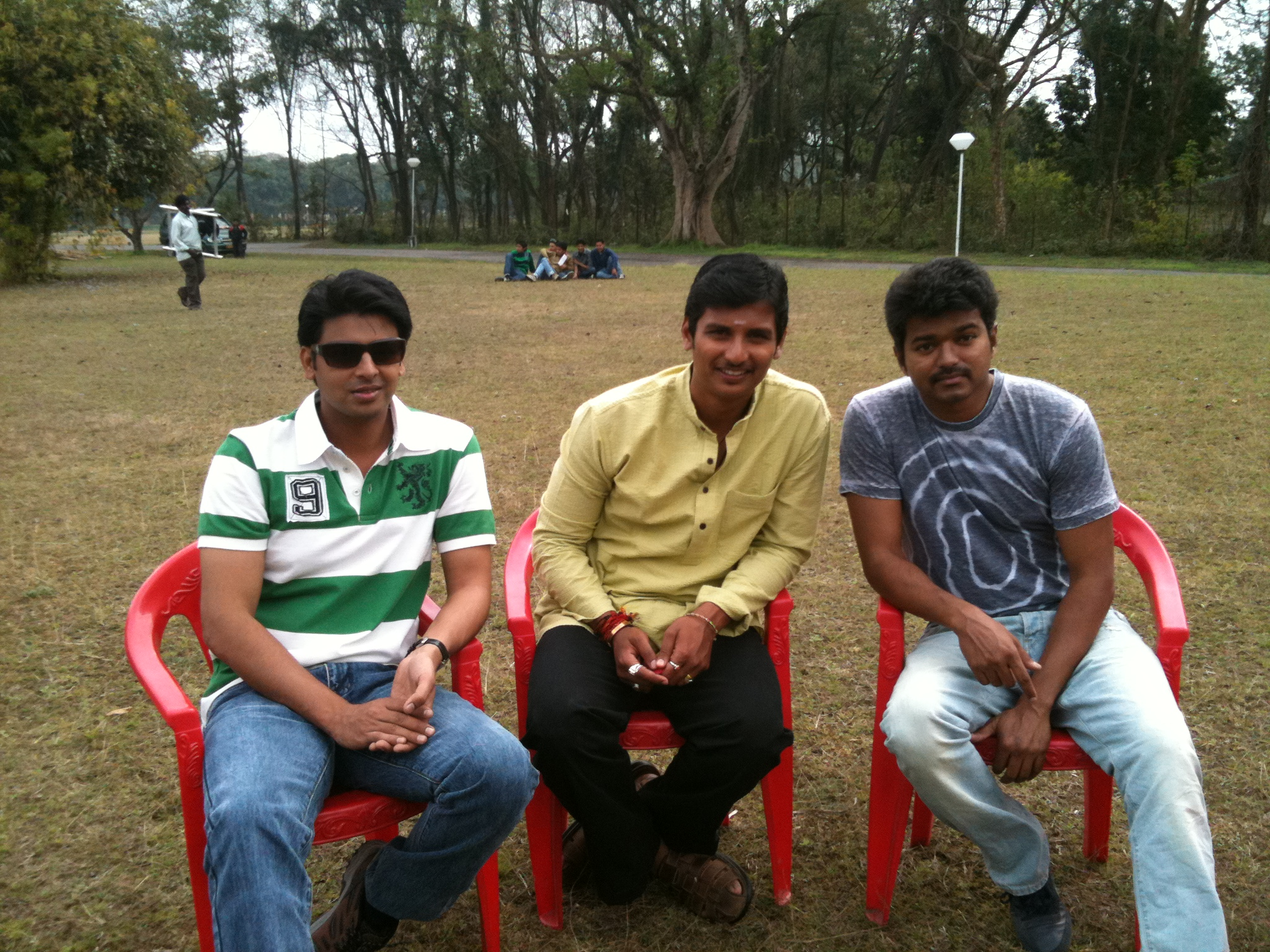
From the sets of Nanban (2012), (from left to right) Srikanth, Jiiva and Vijay

In 2012, he appeared in S. Shankar's comedy-drama Nanban (a remake of the Bollywood blockbuster 3 Idiots). Jiiva reprised the role of Sharman Joshi in the Tamil version as Sevarkodi Senthil and starred alongside Vijay, and Srikanth. At the cost of 550 million (INR), it was one of the most expensive films to be made at that point, and was released on Pongal in 622 screens worldwide. The movie received highly positive reviews and became a blockbuster. Malathi Rangarajan of The Hindu stated, "As for Jiiva, you give him characters with scope and he delivers". His next project was Mysskin's Mugamoodi (2012), the first ever Tamil superhero movie. Reports claimed that Jiiva underwent special training at Mansuria Kung Fu YMCA, Nandanam, Chennai, the same place where he had trained in Kung-Fu for a few years before venturing into movies. High-end gadgets were used in the film, designed by the Indian Institutes of Technology (IIT), while teams from the National Institute of Fashion Technology (NIFT) created the costumes and looks of the characters. It is said that Jiiva's super hero costume, designed by Gabriella Wilkins, weighed more than 10 kg.

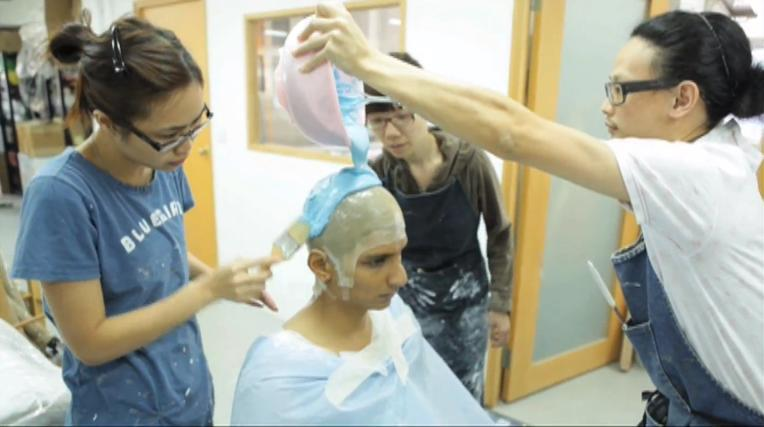
Jiiva during an 8-hour head casting session in Hong Kong for make up for the superhero film Mugamoodi (2012)

The movie opened to positive reviews, and a few cited it as "different and refreshing". The movie received much attention from children. Jiiva received appreciation from critics for his role as Lee. "The titular role fits Jiiva well, very much like the armour he dons. But your heart goes out to him — performing stunts in a costume that looks unbearably heavy, with a face-mask to boot must have been quite a task," commented The Hindu review. Firstpost called Jiiva's role a "rewarding performance". "Jiiva has obviously given his best, and his martial arts sequences are worthy of applause," said Rediff.

Jiiva's next venture was Gautham Vasudev Menon's Neethaane En Ponvasantham (2012), starring opposite Samantha Ruth Prabhu. The film had an average run at the box office. Critics and audiences felt that the actor brought dignity to the screen as Varun Krishnan. After this, he worked on Bejoy Nambiar's David (2013) alongside Vikram, which garnered positive reviews, but failed at the box office. His next movie was Endrendrum Punnagai, where he was paired with Trisha for the first time. The film, based on friendship, was a commercial success. In 2014, he worked in cinematographer Ravi K. Chandran's directorial debut Yaan. Despite the pre-release hype, the film received negative reviews and was a box office failure.

=== 2015–present: Challenges and comeback ===
Jiiva took a break for a year in 2015 and returned with three releases in 2016. He starred in his 25th film Pokkiri Raja, which opened to mixed to negative reviews. His next film was the long delayed Thirunaal in which he united with Nayantara for the second time. He was next seen in a romantic comedy, Kavalai Vendam (2016), where he was paired opposite Kajal Aggarwal. The movie had mixed reviews. "Jiiva seems like the perfect choice for the role, being effortlessly flippant, funny and intensely emotional", said Rediff.com's review.

His 2017 release, Sangili Bungili Kadhava Thorae, a horror comedy by debut director Ike, received a mixed reviews to positive reviews and performed well at the box office. His next movie was Kalakalappu 2 (2018), directed by Sundar C. Jiiva was seen alongside Shiva, Jai, Nikki Galrani and Catherine Tresa. A comedy entertainer, the movie received mixed reviews but performed well at the box office and was a super hit.

Jiiva's next film Kee, a cyber thriller, released in 2019 was received with mixed reviews, had an average run at the box-office. Jiiva's next film Gorilla released in mid-2019. This film had a chimpanzee in a key role which was the first ever instance in Indian film history. It was also revealed that the chimpanzee named Kong was hired from the Samut training station of Thailand. Most of the sequences related to the chimpanzee were shot in Thailand and the remaining portions were shot in Chennai.

In 2020, he starred in the action movie Seeru followed by the romance Gypsy. In 2021, he appeared in the multistarrer drama, Kalathil Santhippom which received positive reviews. He acted in Kabir Khan's Hindi film 83, playing the role of Kris Srikkanth. In 2022, he was seen in the romantic comedy drama Coffee with Kadhal and Varalaru Mukkiyam. Jiiva playing Andhra Pradesh chief minister Y. S. Jagan Mohan Reddy in the Telugu sequel, Yatra 2 (2024). Followed by movie Black (2024), which was released in theatres this October 11 and has acquired positive responses from both audiences and critics. Jiiva's next movie was with Pa. Vijay titled Aghathiyaa. The film was released in 2025 to negative reviews.

== Filmography ==
Key
†	Denotes films that have not yet been released

- All films are in Tamil, unless otherwise noted.

=== Film ===
List of film acting credits
Year	Title	Role(s)	Notes	Ref.
1991	Perum Pulli		Child artist	
1991	Cheran Pandian	Boy playing with Chinna Gounder	Child artist	
2003	Aasai Aasaiyai	Vinod		
2003	Thithikkudhe	Chinnu (Venu)		
2005	Raam	Rama Krishna		
2006	Dishyum	Bhaskar		
2006	E	Easwaran		
2006	Keerthi Chakra	Havildar Jaikumar	Malayalam film; partially reshot in Tamil as Aran	
2007	Pori	Hari		
2007	Kattradhu Thamizh	Prabhakar	Nominated—Vijay Award for Best Actor	
2007	Rameswaram	Jeevan		
2008	Thenavattu	Kottaisami		
2009	Siva Manasula Sakthi	Siva		
2009	TN 07 AL 4777	Narrator		
2010	Kacheri Arambam	Paari		
2010	Boss Engira Bhaskaran	Shiva	Cameo	
2011	Singam Puli	Shiva/Ashok Kumar	Dual role	
2011	Ko	Ashwin Kumar		
2011	Rowthiram	Siva		
2011	Vandhaan Vendraan	Arjun		
2012	Nanban	Sevarkodi Senthil		
2012	Mugamoodi	Anand (Bruce Lee)		
2012	Neethaane En Ponvasantham	Varun Krishnan	Tamil Nadu State Film Award for Best Actor	
2012	Yeto Vellipoyindhi Manasu	Train Passenger	Telugu film; special appearance in the song "Koti Koti"	
2013	David	David		
2013	Endrendrum Punnagai	Goutham Sridhar		
2014	Jilla	Himself	Special appearance in the song "Paatu Onnu"	
2014	Yaan	K. Chandrasekhar		
2016	Pokkiri Raja	Sanjeevi	25th Film	
2016	Thirunaal	Blade Ganesh		
2016	Kadavul Irukaan Kumaru	Karthik Kumar	Cameo	
2016	Kavalai Vendam	Aravind Baskar		
2017	Sangili Bungili Kadhava Thorae	Vasu		
2018	Kalakalappu 2	Srinivas		
2018	Tamizh Padam 2	Himself	Special appearance	
2019	Kee	Siddharth		
2019	Gorilla	Jiiva		
2020	Seeru	Manimaran		
2020	Gypsy	Gypsy		
2021	Kalathil Santhippom	Ashok		
2021	83	Kris Srikkanth	Hindi film	
2022	Coffee with Kadhal	Saravanan		
2022	Nitham Oru Vaanam	Real V. Prabhakaran	Cameo	
2022	Varalaru Mukkiyam	Karthik Gopal		
2023	Custody	Vishnu	Telugu-Tamil bilingual film; cameo	
2024	Singapore Saloon	Himself	Cameo	
2024	Yatra 2	Y. S. Jagan Mohan Reddy	Telugu film	
2024	Black	Vasanth		
2025	Aghathiyaa	Aghathiyan / Nanjilan	Dual role	
2026	Thalaivar Thambi Thalaimaiyil	Jeevarathnam	Also creative producer	
2026	S Saraswathi	Aditya	Telugu film; extended cameo	
2026	Jolliya Iruntha Oruthan	TBA	Filming	

=== As dubbing artist ===
Year	Title	Actor	Notes	Ref.
2007	Madurai Veeran	Jithan Ramesh		
2023	Farzi	Shahid Kapoor	Tamil dubbed version	

== Television ==
Year	Title	Role(s)	Network	Notes
2008	Jodi Number One	Judge	Star Vijay	Season 4
2014	Yuttha Medai All Stars	Judge	Astro Vinmeen HD	
2022	Sarkaar With Jiiva	Host	Aha	

== Awards and nominations ==
List of awards and nominations received by Jiiva
Year	Award	Category	Film	Result	Ref.
2006	Cyprus International Film Festival	Best Actor	Raam	Won	
2007	Asianet Film Awards	Best Star Pair (with Gopika)	Keerthi Chakra	Won	
2008	Vijay Awards	Best Actor	Kattradhu Thamizh	Nominated	
2012	Vijay Awards	Best Actor	Ko	Nominated	
2012	Filmfare Awards South	Best Actor – Tamil	Ko	Nominated	
2012	Tamil Nadu State Film Awards	Best Actor	Neethaane En Ponvasantham	Won	
2022	International Indian Film Academy Awards	Best Supporting Actor	83	Nominated	

=== Honours ===
- Kalaimamani Award - 2006
