= Ko 2 =

2016 film by Sarath

- Theatrical release poster
- Directed by: Sarath Mandava
- Written by: Dialogues: Bakkiam Sankar; Raja Ram
- Screenplay by: Sarath Mandava
- Story by: Anand Ravi
- Produced by: Elred Kumar; Jayaraman
- Starring: Bobby Simha; Prakash Raj; Nikki Galrani
- Cinematography: Philip R Sunder; Venkat M.
- Edited by: Richard Kevin
- Music by: Leon James
- Production company: R. S. Infotainment
- Release date: May 13, 2016 (India)
- Running time: 128 minutes
- Country: India
- Language: Tamil

Ko 2 (transl. King 2) is a 2016 Indian political thriller film co-written and directed by Sarath and produced by Elred Kumar. A standalone sequel to Ko (2011) and a remake of the Telugu film Prathinidhi (2014), it stars Bobby Simha, Nikki Galrani, and Prakash Raj (reprising his role from the first film), while Bala Saravanan, Ilavarasu, and John Vijay play supporting roles. The music was composed by Leon James with editing by Richard Kevin. The film was planned to release in April 2016 but was released on 13 May 2016.

== Plot ==
A commoner named Kumaran kidnaps the Chief Minister of Tamil Nadu, Yogeeswaran, at a private retirement home event in Chennai. The news goes viral, and everyone from the local to the central cabinet takes the issue personally. Home Minister Thillainayagam appoints Santhanapandian, the Police Commissioner of Tirunelveli, to rescue Yogeeswaran. Santhanapandian questions Bala, a minister's son discovered unconscious at the kidnapping scene. Bala informs Santhanapandian that he and Kumaran had become friends when Kumaran saved him from a group of thugs, but they are shocked to find that both love the same girl, Priyadharshini. Bala also reveals that Kumaran willingly allowed him to pursue his relationship with Priyadharshini in exchange for arranging for Yogeeswaran to attend the retirement home event.

Meanwhile, as Santhanapandian and his deputy, ACP Arivazhagan, strive to get clues about Kumaran, Kumaran explains to Yogeeswaran his motive for kidnapping him. Kumaran was an orphan, but thanks to the efforts of an honest politician named Kumaraswamy, who sponsored him, he got a good education and became a journalist with the News7 TV channel. When he went to Kumaraswamy's house to thank him for contributing to his life, he discovered from Kumaraswamy's intellectually disabled son, also named Kumaran, that he had gone missing for many days. On further investigation, he learned that Thillainayagam and his sons, Kishore and Prathap, buried Kumaraswamy alive. Thillainayagam had contested against Kumaraswamy in the last election and had defeated him by rigging the vote, forcing Kumaraswamy to file a case against him and demand a recount. When Kumaraswamy refused to withdraw the case against him, Thillainayagam and his sons buried him alive. Kumaran (kidnapper) then filed a police case against Thillainayagam and asked Kumaran (Thillainayagam's son), who was unaware of his father's murder, to give the statement to the police inspector. However, the police inspector was Thillainayagam's aide and informed him about Kumaran (Thillainayagam's son). Thillainayagam's sons then took Kumaran on a bus and pushed him out en route. He was then run over by a lorry and died. Kumaran (kidnapper) feels guilty that he is responsible for the other Kumaran's death.

To avenge their deaths, Kumaran plotted with Priyadharshini and Bala to kidnap Yogeeswaran and expose Thillainayagam slowly through false media reports using Bala's incorrect answers during police interrogation. In the process, the police take Thillainayagam's sons into questioning. After being tortured, they eventually accept and expose Thillainayagam as Kumaraswamy's murderer, even giving them the location on Thillainayagam's lawn where they buried Kumaraswamy. They dig up the spot and discover Kumaraswamy's skeleton. The police arrest Thillainayagam, and Kumaran releases Yogeeswaran. Kumaran also escapes from his hideout and poses as a journalist, while Yogeeswaran says he cannot identify the kidnapper. Even Sanathanapandian gives up on pursuing the kidnapper, as the latter had kidnapped Yogeeswaran with good intentions.

== Cast ==
- Bobby Simha as Kumaran, a commoner
- Prakash Raj as Chief Minister Yogeeswaran
- Nikki Galrani as Priyadharshini (Voice dubbed by Uma Maheshwari)
- Bala Saravanan as Bala
- Ilavarasu as Home Minister Thillainayagam
- John Vijay as Police Commissioner Santhanapandian
- Nassar as Kumaraswamy
- Karunakaran as Kumaran, Kumaraswamy's son
- Bharath Reddy as ACP Arivazhagan
- Shan as Kishore
- Reshma Pasupuleti as Shobana
- Mayilsamy as Yogeeswaran's party volunteer
- Crane Manohar as Yogeeswaran's party volunteer
- Gowtham
- Ravi Venkatraman

== Production ==
Following the success of Ko (2011) directed by K. V. Anand, the producers had floated the idea of a potential sequel with pre-production work beginning on a follow-up film featuring co-producer James in the lead role. The film, however, failed to take off and in April 2015, Elred Kumar announced that he would be producing Ko 2 and that the new venture would be made by an entirely different team. New actors and technicians were added to the team to replace those involved in the original, with Sarath announced as the director. Bobby Simha and Nikki Galrani were revealed to be the lead actors, while it was announced that Prakash Raj would play the role of a Chief Minister. Leon James, who made his debut with Kanchana 2, was signed on to compose the film's score and soundtrack.

In June 2015, the team released a motion poster and announced that the film was 50% complete.

== Music ==
The film's score and soundtrack was composed by Leon James, in his first solo venture after previously working on two songs on Kanchana 2 alongside three other composers.

The song "Unnai Matrinal" was released as a single track song as a tribute to ex-president A. P. J. Abdul Kalam, it was released on 14 August 2015. The album was released on 1 October 2015, but a promo for each song was released a week before. "Kohila" promo was released 22 September 2015, "Kannama" promo was released on 23 September 2015, and "Vidaadha" was released on 24 September 2015.

Behindwoods rated the album 3 out of 5 and said, "The album stays true to the film’s theme and also vouches for novel experimentation and musical feast!". The audio rights are secured by Sony Music.

Ko 2

Soundtrack album by Leon James
- Released: 2 October 2015
- Recorded: 2015
- Genre: Feature film soundtrack
- Length: 23:31
- Label: Sony Music
- Producer: Leon James

Leon James chronology
Kanchana 2 (2015)	Ko 2 (2015)	Kavalai Vendam (2016)

Track listing
No.	Title	Lyrics	Singer(s)	Length
1.	"Kannama"	Na. Muthukumar	Inno Genga, Chinmayi	4:52
2.	"Kohila"	Madhan Karky	Leon James, Neeti Mohan	3:48
3.	"Vidaadha"	Na. Muthukumar	Vishal Dadlani, Leon James	4:35
4.	"Ko Theme"		Instrumental	1:17
5.	"Kannama Reprise"	Na. Muthukumar	Salim Merchant	4:25
6.	"Unnai Matrinal"	Na. Muthukumar	Harish Sivaramakrishnan	4:34

== Reception ==
A critic from The Times of India rated the film 2.5/5 and wrote, "We get scenes that lack rhythm, flat staging and are tonally way off the mark, and actors who are badly directed". A critic from Rediff.com rated the film 2/5 stars and wrote, "Director Sarath’s intentions may have been good but Ko 2 is too dreary to make an impact". Baradwaj Rangan of The Hindu wrote that "Ko 2 is a nice-enough change from the macho vigilante movies we usually get".
