= Mayajaal =

Shopping mall in Chennai, India

Coordinates: 12.847986°N 80.239527°E

- Type: Public
- Industry: Entertainment
- Founded: 1997; 29 years ago
- Headquarters: Kanathur, Chennai, India
- Number of locations: 1
- Area served: India
- Key people: Anita Udeep
- Parent: Mayajaal Entertainment
- Website: www.mayajaal.com

Mayajaal (literally, "phantasmagoria") is an entertainment centre in Kanathur, Chennai, India. It is located on the East Coast Road and spread over an area of 30 acres. It consists of a shopping mall, a multiplex, a sports complex and a resort. Mayajaal has a sixteen screen multiplex and it is the second largest multiplex in Asia. The sports complex was started in 2003, which also hosted the Indian Cricket League matches. The Resort was opened in 2005 with 40 rooms. The 30,000 sq.ft shopping mall was opened in 2006.

== Notable Releases ==
Kamal Haasan's Vikram got released across all 16 screens.
