= Dude (soundtrack) =

2025 film soundtrack album

- Soundtrack album cover

Soundtrack album by Sai Abhyankkar
- Released: 26 October 2025
- Recorded: 2025
- Studios: YOLO Records, Chennai; Sai Dhwani Studios, Hyderabad
- Genre: Feature film soundtrack
- Length: 28:26
- Language: Tamil
- Label: Think Music
- Producer: Sai Abhyankkar

Sai Abhyankkar chronology
Balti (2025)	Dude (2025)	Karuppu (2026)
External audio
- Dude - Jukebox on YouTube

Singles from Dude
- 1. "Oorum Blood" Released: 28 August 2025; 2. "Nallaru Po" Released: 19 September 2025; 3. "Singari" Released: 4 October 2025; 4. "Kannukulla" Released: 15 October 2025

Dude is the soundtrack album composed by Sai Abhyankkar to the 2025 Tamil-language romantic comedy film of the same name written and directed by Keerthiswaran and produced by Mythri Movie Makers, starring Pradeep Ranganathan and Mamitha Baiju. The album features nine songs with lyrics written by Vivek, Paal Dabba, Adesh Krishna and Sanjay Semvi. Led by four singles, the album was released through Think Music on 26 October 2025.

== Background ==
The film score and soundtrack by Sai Abhyankkar; Dude was one of Abhyankkar's projects he signed before his film debut with Balti, Karuppu and Benz and was his sophomore film to be released, while also being his Tamil debut. Pradeep recommended Abhyankkar's name to Keerthiswaran after listening to his viral independent singles "Katchi Sera" and "Aasa Kooda".

The song "Kannukulla", a melodic duet number, was his first song he composed for the film. He performed the song with Jonita Gandhi, and featured lyrics written by Adesh Krishna. "Oorum Blood" is an introductory pop number, sung by Abhyankkar and Deepthi Suresh, along with rap vocals performed by Paal Dabba (who wrote the lyrics) and Bebhumika.

"Singari", written by newcomer Sanjay Semvi, also marked Pradeep's debut as a playback singer. Pradeep recalled in an interview with Anupama Chopra, that he had ambitions to sing ever since his childhood and would often sing the lyrics for composers in his directorials. He recalled that composer Yuvan Shankar Raja provided him an opportunity to sing one song for Love Today (2022) owing to his passion in singing, but withdrew it as he felt that the song would get more publicity if it is sung by either Yuvan or Sid Sriram. Though he had given up his plans, Keerthiswaran and Abhyankkar insisted on whether he would sing for a film, for which he felt elated. He recorded the song within 4–5 hours and considered it to be "pure dopamine hit".

The song "Nallaru Po" was written by Vivek and performed by Abhyankkar's father and singer Tippu, Mohit Chauhan and Abhyankkar himself. The album accompanies three songs—"Yumabaibesa" and the reprised and unplugged versions of "Kannukulla" and "Oorum Blood"—along with two themes—"Blud Is On His Way", which featured in the film's announcement teaser and the trailer theme "Dude Trailer Blast".

== Release ==
The audio rights were acquired by Think Music. The first single "Oorum Blood" was released on 28 August 2025. The second single "Nallaru Po" was released on 19 September. The third single "Singari" was released on 4 October. The fourth single "Kannukulla" was released on 15 October 2025. The album was released on 26 October 2025, nine days after the film's release.

== Reception ==
The song "Oorum Blood" initially garnered mixed response from audiences, but went viral after release.

Srinivasa Ramanujam of The Hindu wrote "Sai Abhyankkar – the man behind the music – delivers tunes that naturally fit the milieu and situations; his 'Oorum Blood' tracks (the film version and the unplugged version) are massive earworms." Prashanth Vallavan of Cinema Express wrote "Sai Abhyankkar's music matches the wacky tone of the film but it quickly gets overwhelming. The background score is trying to overpower the visuals, with its own understanding of the scene. 'Oorum Blood' is memorable but Sai needs to understand storytelling as much as he understands music."

Janani K. of India Today wrote "Music director Sai Abhyankkar's songs add value to the film. However, he needs to up his game when it comes to background music, as 'Oorum Blood' plays in different variations throughout the film." Roopa Radhakrishnan of The Times of India wrote "Sai Abhyankkar perfectly gets Keerthiswaran's vision and wonderfully conveys that through his music". Neeshita Nyayapati of Hindustan Times called the music "immersive". Hariprasad Sadanandan of The Week wrote Sai Abhyankkar's music and background score which elevate the film by a few notches."

== Track listing ==
Tamil
No.	Title	Lyrics	Singer(s)	Length
1.	"Oorum Blood"	Paal Dabba	Sai Abhyankkar, Paal Dabba, Bebhumika, Deepthi Suresh	4:01
2.	"Singari"	Sanjay Semvi	Pradeep Ranganathan, Sai Abhyankkar, Sai Smriti, The Indian Choral Ensemble	3:28
3.	"Nallaru Po"	Vivek	Tippu, Mohit Chauhan, Sai Abhyankkar	3:55
4.	"Kannukulla"	Adesh Krishna	Sai Abhyankkar, Jonita Gandhi, Arjun	4:34
5.	"Yumabaibesa"	Sanjay Semvi	Sai Abhyankkar	2:35
6.	"Kannukulla" (Reprise)	Adesh Krishna	Sai Abhyankkar	4:34
7.	"Dude Trailer Blast" (Theme)	—	—	2:41
8.	"Blud Is On His Way" (Theme)	—	—	1:17
9.	"Oorum Blood" (Unplugged)	Paal Dabba	Sai Abhyankkar	1:20
Total length:				28:26

Telugu
No.	Title	Lyrics	Singer(s)	Length
1.	"Boom Boom" (Theme)	Sanapati Bharadwaj Patrudu	Sai Abhyankkar, Deepthi Suresh, Bebhumika	4:01
2.	"Singari"	Ramajogayya Sastry	Sai Abhyankkar, Sai Smriti, The Indian Choral Ensemble	3:28
3.	"Baagundu Po"	Ramajogayya Sastry	Sanjith Hegde, Sai Abhyankkar	3:55
4.	"Nee Gunde Lona"	Ramajogayya Sastry	Sai Abhyankkar, Jonita Gandhi, Arjun	4:34
Total length:				15:58

== Personnel ==
Credits adapted from Think Music:

- Music composer, producer, arranger, programmer, mixing: Sai Abhyankkar
- Additional vocalists: Sai Abhyankkar, Sai Smriti, Arjun, Kavitha Ilango, Surabhi Vimala, Lavanya Jayamohan, Gayathry Rajiv, D. Charumathi, Devu Mathew
- Chorus: The Indian Choral Ensemble
- Choir members: Aparna Harikumar, Yazhini, Sushmita Narasimhan, Rajeevi Ganesh
- Vocal production: Jishnu Vijayan, Lijesh Kumar
- Additional programming: Rudh Prasadh
- Music supervisor: Sachin Lal
- Music consultant: Adesh Krishna
- Recording engineer: Rajesh Kannan, Abin Ponnachan (Yolo Records, Chennai)
- Recording assistance: Sankeerth Shaji, Augustine Premkumar
- Mastering: Sai Abhyankkar, Rupendar Venkatesh, Akash Shravan

Instruments

- Classical guitar and charango: Keba Jeremiah
- Acoustic, electric and bass guitars: Keba Jeremiah, Robin Sebastian, Godfray Immanuel
- Flute: Nikhil Ram
- Violin: Vignesh, Chinmayi
- Horns: Peter, John Kuruvilla
- Navtar: Vishnu Ramprasad
- Sarangi: Momin Khan
- Nadaswaram: Parthiban
- Synths: Sai Abhyankkar
- Keys: Sai Abhyankkar, Rajesh, Melvin
- Bass: Sai Abhyankkar, Naveen Napier, Derick McArthur
- Rhythm: Sai Abhyankkar, Krishna Kishor
- Live rhythms: Yanka Rhythm Group
- Strings: Budapest Scoring Orchestra
- Orchestra conductor: Peter Illenyi
- Orchestra Indian representative: Balasubramanian G
- Session producer: Bálint Sapszon
- Orchestra recording: Viktor Sazbo at Rottenbiller Studios, Budapest
- Librarian: Agnes Sapszon, Kati Reti
- Orchestrators: Balasubramanian G
