= Karuppu (soundtrack) =

2026 film soundtrack album

- Soundtrack album cover

Soundtrack album by Sai Abhyankkar
- Released: 25 May 2026
- Recorded: 2024–2026
- Studios: Yolo Records, Chennai; Studio UNO Records, Chennai; Kuzhali Records, Chennai; Sai Dhwani Studios, Hyderabad
- Genre: Feature film soundtrack
- Length: 29:28
- Language: Tamil
- Label: Think Music
- Producer: Sai Abhyankkar

Sai Abhyankkar chronology
Dude (2025)	Karuppu (2026)	Baththa (2026)

Singles from Karuppu
- 1. "Verappa" Released: 23 July 2025; 2. "God Mode" Released: 20 October 2025; 3. "Naanga Naalu Peru" Released: 23 March 2026; 4. "Raathu Raasan" Released: 14 April 2026; 5. "Karuppa Kooda Vaa" Released: 28 April 2026; 6. "Verappa – Extended" Released: 12 May 2026; 7. "Athu Thalore" Released: 21 May 2026

Karuppu is the soundtrack album composed by Sai Abhyankkar to the 2026 Tamil-language fantasy action film of the same name directed by RJ Balaji and produced by Dream Warrior Pictures starring Suriya, Trisha Krishnan and Balaji. The album featured nine songs with lyrics written by Pa. Vijay, Vivek, Vishnu Edavan, Adesh Krishna, Asal Kolaar and Arun Srinivasan. It is preceded by seven singles, with the album being released through Think Music on 25 May 2026.

== Background ==
The film was initially set to be composed by A. R. Rahman during its announcement in October 2024. Balaji stated that he narrated the script to Rahman prior, expressing his eagerness to work with the musician, and Rahman had eventually liked the script. However, Rahman opted out of the project due to undisclosed reasons and in that December, Sai Abhyankkar was announced to have taken over the scoring duties.

Balaji stated that after Rahman's exit, the team needed songs immediately as the film's production had already commenced. He then contacted Santhosh Kumar, head of Think Music to discuss about Abhyankkar's involvement and despite the team being sceptic on Abhyankkar's role as a composer as he was previously an independent musician, Balaji remained confident with his decision. Karuppu was one of Abhyankkar's multiple projects he signed before release, which included Dude, Balti and Benz, and also his maiden high-profile film. When Abhyankkar was roped for Karuppu, he was unaware that Rahman was involved in the project until Rahman called him that he would be composing for the film and Abhyankkar complimented the veteran musician for his generosity.

Balaji recalled that Abhyankkar had an "abundance of energy" which he wanted to tap it to the fullest, further adding that he had a method to his brilliance, and being accessible on delivering tunes and communicable with the crew making the process more smoothly. He further insisted the composer to approach the film in his style and vision, and compose the tunes based on the script. Balaji did not provide references as his would be based on the musical sensibilities which was unfamiliar from the musical space which Abhyankkar operates as he was from a different generation and insisted to compose the tunes based on his perspective, taste and vision.

== Album information ==
The first song of the album, is "God Mode", an energetic dance number, which was sung by Abhyankkar and Gana Muthu with lyrics written by Vishnu Edavan. In an interaction with Baradwaj Rangan, Abhyankkar stated that he liked the Sambalpuri and Bengali folk music, which he consistently listened to during a trip and this led to the distinctive sounds of the track. The sequence was programmed with a "swing" rhythm laying the foundation for the score, recording the initial hook first, and built the structure including the soft, melodic version and the subsequent verses piece by piece.

The song "Naanga Naalu Peru" is sung by Silambarasan, who recorded the vocals for the track in mid-March 2026. The song further featured rap vocals contributed by Asal Kolaar, while the lyrics were written by Arun Srinivasan. The song was considered to be the introductory track for Balaji's character Baby Kannan, the film's main antagonist. Balaji stated that, the song was not a part of the film's storyline and falsely claimed that the song was edited out due to its poor response. "Raathu Raasan" was recorded by Abhyankkar, V. M. Mahalingam and Paal Dabba, the latter of whom had previously collaborated with the composer for "Oorum Blood" in Dude. The song is a highly energetic, rustic, percussive number. "Karuppa Kooda Vaa" was described by Suriya as a song for the ancestors and the guardian deity Karuppannaswamy. It was performed by Abhyankkar and Mahalingam at the film's audio launch, and mixes the percussive beat of "Raathu Raasan".

"Verappa – Extended" is the four-minute full version of the song "Verappa" that was introduced first in the film's teaser. It was performed by Abhyankkar, Arivu and written by Arun Srinivasan, with rap by Theo. The song "Athu Thalore" is a misnomer of the original French phrase "À toute à l'heure" (transl. see you later). Lyricist Adesh Krishna had explained that the opening French verses: "La justice n'est pas là, À tout à l'heure" literally translates to "the justice is not here, see you later". Krishna assured the use of French words was an interesting choice, as have been studied French to an extent and "À tout à l'heure" instantly connected with him and when Balaji narrated the situation in the opening scene, he felt the words fit perfectly. He then suggested on opening the song with the French lines, Balaji and Abhyankkar were instantly impressed by it. The song is performed by Bengali singer Ananya Chakraborty. The emotional number "Aathi Rasathi" is performed by Dhass Benjamin and written by Pa. Vijay.

== Release ==
The soundtrack featuring nine songs was released on 25 May 2026, ten days after the film's release.

=== Singles ===
The song "Verappa" was teased in the film's teaser which released on Suriya's birthday (23 July 2025) as a single. On the occasion of Diwali (20 October), the song "God Mode" was released as the second single from the album. The third song "Naanga Naalu Peru" was released on 23 March 2026. It was then followed by the fourth song, "Raathu Raasan" on 14 April, coinciding Puthandu, and the fifth song "Karuppa Kooda Vaa" on 28 April. An extended version of "Verappa" was released as the fifth single from the album, titled "Verappa – Extended" on 12 May. The seventh single "Athu Thalore" was released on 21 May.

=== Audio launch ===
The film's audio launch event took place at the Solamalai College of Engineering in Madurai on 26 April. The event was preceded by the cast and crew and featured a live performance of the film's music by Abhyankkar and his team.

=== Original Background Score ===
After the film's theatrical release, there were many constant requests to both Sai Abhyankkar and the production house Dream Warrior Pictures to release the film's original background score soundtrack. Fans of Suriya kept the pressure high even when the film debuted on its OTT streaming platform partner, Amazon Prime Video in the middle of June 2026, but the soundtrack still did not get published. This made fans wait until Suriya's 51st birthday, 23 July 2026, but the soundtrack still did not release on the actor's special occasion. Hence, released on all streaming platforms on 6 August 2026, globally. Featuring a two-album release, with the first album featuring 26 tracks titled Karuppu (Original Score) - Side A: Just God Things, and the second album featuring 21 tracks, titled Karuppu (Original Score) - Side B: God Mode Begins, differentiating the two moods of the film that RJ Balaji made.

== Reception ==
Bhuvanesh Chandar of The Hindu felt that though Abhyankkar's songs whose picturisation balanced the modernised take on a spiritual film, "his scores do appear to distract one from the proceedings". Yashaswini Sri of The Indian Express wrote that "Sai Abhyankkar's background score does a lot of the right things at the right times, especially around the interval block." Janani K. of India Today stated that "Sai Abhyankkar's music makes it feel like a proper commercial entertainer with great production values".

Avinash Ramachandran of The New Indian Express admitted that Abhyankkar's music makes "Karuppu sound like a rousing chant that reverberates in the air" adding that "While there are scenes where his emotional soundtrack doesn't leave the same impact, he more than compensates for it in the 'mass' moments." Balakrishna Ganeshan of The News Minute stated "Sai Abhyankkar's loud, pulsating score complements the film's heightened emotions and mass appeal".

== Track listing ==
Track listing
No.	Title	Lyrics	Singer(s)	Length
1.	"God Mode"	Vishnu Edavan	Sai Abhyankkar, Gana Muthu	4:00
2.	"Naanga Naalu Peru"	Asal Kolaar, Arun Srinivasan	Silambarasan TR, Sai Abhyankkar, Asal Kolaar	3:18
3.	"Raathu Raasan"	Vivek	Sai Abhyankkar, V. M. Mahalingam, Paal Dabba	3:15
4.	"Karuppa Kooda Va"	Pa. Vijay	Sai Abhyankkar, V. M. Mahalingam	4:10
5.	"Verappa Extended"	Arun Srinivasan	Sai Abhyankkar, Arivu, Theo	4:20
6.	"Athu Thalore (A Tout A Lheure)"	Adesh Krishna	Ananya Chakraborty	3:51
7.	"Aathi Raasathi"	Pa. Vijay	Dhass Benjamin	3:57
8.	"God Mode Begins"	Vishnu Edavan	Gana Muthu	0:55
9.	"Verappa"	Arun Srinivasan	Arivu	1:40
Total length:				29:26

Veerabhadrudu (Telugu)
No.	Title	Lyrics	Singer(s)	Length
1.	"God Mode"	Kasarla Shyam	Kaala Bhairava	4:00
2.	"Memu Nalugurunnam"	Kasarla Shyam	Nazeeruddin	3:18
3.	"Saami Veta"	Ramajogayya Sastry	Vinayak, Bharath Raj Avula, Ritesh G Rao	3:15
4.	"Verappa Extended"	Kasarla Shyam	Arun Kaundinya, Bharath Raj Avula, Yogi Sekar	4:20

== Background Score ==
Original Score - Side A: Just God Things
No.	Title	Length
1.	"All will be Fine"	1:09
2.	"Innocent Dad (Athutalore Sad)"	0:40
3.	"Pei Theme"	0:50
4.	"She Passed Away"	1:28
5.	"The Promise"	0:56
6.	"Better Call Baby Kannan"	0:22
7.	"Baby Kannan Looses Cool"	0:33
8.	"Baile Baby"	0:31
9.	"Confession of the Victim"	0:37
10.	"Filthy Judge"	0:23
11.	"God Feels for the Innocent Souls"	0:58
12.	"Guilt Triggered"	1:05
13.	"Judge Refuses Gods Request"	0:33
14.	"Justice Delayed"	0:40
15.	"Liar Liar"	1:52
16.	"Pinacle of Patience"	0:59
17.	"Red Bandana"	1:13
18.	"Strange Dream"	1:09
19.	"The Dead Court"	0:36
20.	"The Magic Freeze"	1:47
21.	"The Snatch"	1:07
22.	"Theme of Dad"	0:29
23.	"Thieves"	0:23
24.	"Triggered Lawyers"	1:05
25.	"You have no Power"	0:32
26.	"Watch Baby Kannan"	0:32

Original Score - Side B: God Mode Begins
No.	Title	Length
1.	"Verappa (Urumum Venga) - Female Version"	1:32
2.	"Karuppane Vaarumayya"	1:35
3.	"Walk of the King (Verappa Orchestral)"	1:35
4.	"Verappa Thandavam Interval"	3:07
5.	"God Mode - Hyper Pop"	1:17
6.	"Karuppu - Title Theme"	0:42
7.	"Metro Fight (feat. Paal Dabba)"	1:06
8.	"The Rise of Karuppu"	1:09
9.	"Karuppu vs Vellai"	1:27
10.	"On the Way to Burn"	0:48
11.	"The One"	0:25
12.	"Thatak Junak Arrival Dream"	0:40
13.	"Smahoo Karuppu Instincts"	0:14
14.	"Karuppu Blasts Baby Kannan"	0:35
15.	"Raathu Raasan (Orchestral Version)"	0:47
16.	"Karuppu Game Begins"	0:32
17.	"Idhu Enga Territory"	0:43
18.	"Molaga"	0:46
19.	"The Radar Switch"	2:01
20.	"Verappa (Punjabi Version)"	2:16
21.	"Vetta Karuppu Game Begins"	2:38

== Personnel ==
Credits adapted from Think Music India:

- Music composer and producer – Sai Abhyankkar
- Studios – Yolo Records, Chennai; Studio UNO Records, Chennai; Kuzhali Records, Chennai; Sai Dhwani Studios, Hyderabad
- Recording engineers – Rajesh Kannan, Abin Ponnachan, Jishnu Vijayan, Karthik Manickavasakam, Sivasathya R
- Mixing engineers – Sai Abhyankkar, Akash Shravan
- Mastering engineers – Akash Shravan, Rupendar Venkatesh, Roshan Sebastian
- Creative consultant – Adesh Krishna
- Music supervisor – Sachin Lal

Musicians

- Synth, keys, bass, rhythm – Sai Abhyankkar
- Additional percussions and rhythms – Kalyan, Iniyan
- Kumbhaara rhythm – Yanka Percussions Group
- Nasik dhol – Salem Kuzhi
- Guitar – Robin Sebastian, Godfray Immanuel
- Trumpets – Rakesh MS
- Moorsing – Mahesh Vinayakram
- Navtar – Vishnu Ramprasad
- Shehnai – S. Ballesh
- Katakaa ethnic reed – Kaviayyan
- Jaw harp – Bunty
- Vocal harmonies – Jishnu Vijayan
- Choir – The Indian Choral Ensemble
- Choir singers – Bavathayini Nagarajan, Vanathishree Suresh, Sivaranjini Chandramouli, Rutuja Pande, Aparna Harikumar, Asvitha Ram, Rajeevi Ganesh, Yazhini, Sushmita Narasimhan, Nidhi Saraogi, Alisha Mathew Thayil, Megha Salila M, Shruthy Parthasarathy, Shri Badhra K A, Ananya A, Kaaviya S, Prasanthi, Varsha R Mallya, Keerthivasan, Sumathi Shekar, Karthik P Govind, Shridhar Ramesh, Vikram Chandra Kumar V, Shivsundar R, Shibi Srinivasan, Manikandan Chembai, Vivin Richards, R Shravan Narayan, Ben Reevs, Prashanth Mohanasundaram
- Choir conductor – Kalyani Nair, Karthik Manickavasakam
