= Baththa (soundtrack) =

2026 film soundtrack album

Soundtrack album by Sai Abhyankkar
- Released: 2 October 2026
- Recorded: 2026
- Studios: Yolo Records, Chennai; AM Studios, Chennai; Kuzhali Records, Chennai; Studio UNO Records, Chennai; Café Musica, Chennai; Sai Dhwani Studios, Hyderabad; Synergy Studios, Chennai; Soundtown Studios, Chennai; Reengara Studios, Chennai; Voice N Vision Studios, Chennai; Vanaj Kesav Digi Audio Waves, Chennai; YRF Studios, Mumbai; The Sanctuary, Mumbai; VTP Studios, Kochi; Studio DMI, Las Vegas
- Genre: Feature film soundtrack
- Length: 27:56
- Label: Think Music
- Producer: Sai Abhyankkar

Sai Abhyankkar chronology
Karuppu (2026)	Baththa (2026)	Om (2026)
External audio
- Baththa – Jukebox on YouTube

Singles from Baththa
- 1. "Magale" Released: 9 September 2026; 2. "Jiguchikkan" Released: 16 September 2026; 3. "Ooroda Oththa Don" Released: 22 September 2026; 4. "Mozhiye" Released: 27 September 2026; 5. "Vaazhanum Baththa" Released: 1 October 2026

Baththa is the soundtrack album composed by Sai Abhyankkar to the 2026 Tamil-language comedy drama film of the same name directed by Balaji Tharaneetharan and produced by Murad Khetani, Priya Atlee, Alok Jain and Ajit Andhare under Cine1 Studios, A for Apple Studios and Star Studio18, starring Vijay Sethupathi in the titular role, alongside Master Sai Prithviraj and Lijomol Jose. The album featured 10 songs with lyrics written by Karthik Netha, KK Nagar Gana Jeeva, Thamizh Aadhavan and Tiwari. Led by five singles, the album was released through Think Music on 2 October 2026.

== Background ==
The film's music is composed by Sai Abhyankkar in his maiden collaboration with both Vijay Sethupathi and Balaji Tharaneetharan. Balaji initially considered Ilaiyaraaja to score music for Baththa owing on how the composer's work had shaped his formative years in his childhood, and thought of how to incorporate the influences of classical music while avoiding the clichéd representation of the 1980s period. Eventually, his daughter had likened Abhyankkar's independent singles, particularly "Aasa Kooda" and this led to the composer's involvement, with Atlee's intervention was also instrumental. Balaji noted that Abhyankkar had a good understanding of music and had also shared the likedness of several older compositions of Ilaiyaraaja, particularly Veedu which he was in high praise for. The songs consisted of 1980s classical music as well as mixing contemporary and traditional rhythms. Karthik Netha contributed lyrics for three of the songs, along with KK Nagar Gana Jeeva and Thamizh Aadhavan.

== Release ==
The audio rights were acquired by Think Music. The first single "Magale" was released on 9 September 2026. The track "Jiguchikkan" which featured in the "World of Baththa" glimpse was released on 16 September. The third single, "Ooroda Oththa Don" was released on 22 September, followed by the fourth single "Mozhiye" which released on 27 September, and the final single "Vaazhanum Baththa" on 1 October.

The film's audio launch was held at the Sathyabama Institute of Science and Technology in Chennai on 18 September, featuring the cast and crew in attendance and also had a live performance of the songs by Abhyankkar and his musical team. However, the album featuring 10 songs was launched two weeks later, on 2 October, a day after the film's release.

== Reception ==
M Suganth of The Times of India wrote "Sai Abhyankkar's thematic song, Chellame Magale, serves as the film's emotional core, even if the composer tends to overscore the background music elsewhere." Yashaswini Sri of The Indian Express wrote "Sai Abhyankkar's music and background score have been singled out as one of the film's strongest elements. The score enhances the emotional moments without overwhelming them, and the songs, while not all necessary, are well-composed and period-appropriate."

Janani K of India Today wrote "Sai Abhyankkar's lilting melodies and background score take us back to the 80s and elevate several sequences." Aashna Nadkarni of Mashable India said that Abhyankkar's music "blends songs and background scores perfectly with the plot. It goes hand-in-hand and so in sync, that it builds anticipation on what is going to happen next." Manivasagan Namasivayam of DT Next wrote "The music by Sai Abhyankkar is another major strength. Unlike the fast-paced musical approach of his earlier work, the score and songs complement the film and elevate several of its key sequences."

The soundtrack was featured at the eighth position of Spotify Global Top Ten songs for the week of 9–11 October.

== Track listing ==
No.	Title	Lyrics	Singer(s)	Length
1.	"Magale"	Karthik Netha	Sai Abhyankkar, Harini	4:17
2.	"Ooroda Oththa Don"	KK Nagar Gana Jeeva	Sai Abhyankkar, Vangal Pulla Vicky, Thamizh Aadhavan	3:31
3.	"Mozhiye"	Karthik Netha	Sid Sriram	3:52
4.	"Jiguchikkan"	Thamizh Aadhavan	Sai Abhyankkar, Deepthi Suresh, Padmaja Sreenivasan, Priyanka NK, Gayathry Rajiv	1:47
5.	"Vaazhanum Baththa"	Karthik Netha	Sai Abhyankkar	3:31
6.	"Cheen Dapak Dum Dum"	Thamizh Aadhavan, Tiwari	Sai Abhyankkar, Thamizh Adhavan, Anumita Basu	2:29
7.	"Baththa Avatharam"	Thamizh Aadhavan	Thamizh Adhavan	0:28
8.	"The Feel of Baththa"	Karthik Netha	Sai Abhyankkar, Harini, Indu, Lavanya, Narmada	1:12
9.	"Baththa Lacrimosa"	—	The Indian Choral Ensemble	2:27
10.	"Chellame Magale" (Mohan Kannan version)	Karthik Netha	Mohan Kannan	4:16
Total length:				27:56

== Personnel ==
Credits adapted from Think Music India:

- Music composer, producer, arranger and programmer: Sai Abhyankkar
- Music supervisor: Sachin Lal
- Creative consultant: Adesh Krishna
- Recording: Rajesh Kannan, Abin Ponnachan, Jishnu Vijayan (Yolo Records, Chennai); Ajay Shivashankar, Lokesh Vijayakumar (Synergy Studios, Chennai); Pradeep Menon, Aravind MS, S Padmasharan (AM Studios, Chennai); Karthick Manickavasakam (Kuzhali Records, Chennai); R Sivasathya (Studio UNO Records, Chennai); Midhun Manoj, Vishnu Sankar (Soundtown Studios, Chennai); Aswin Krishna, Adarsh Narayanan (Reengara Studios, Chennai); Lijesh Kumar (Voice N Vision Studios, Chennai); Senthil Prasad (Vanaj Kesav Digi Audio Waves, Chennai); Vijay Dayal, Abhishek Khandelwal (YRF Studios, Mumbai); Vedant Uttarkar (The Sanctuary, Mumbai); Vibin Sundar (Café Musica, Chennai)
- Mixing: Sai Abhyankkar (Yolo Records, Chennai); Akash Shravan, Rupendar Venkatesh (Sai Dhwani Studios, Hyderabad); Abin Paul (mixwithabin)
- Mastering: Akash Shravan, Rupendar Venkatesh (Sai Dhwani Studios, Hyderabad); Abin Paul (mixwithabin); Luca Pretolesi, Alistair Pintus (Studio DMI, Las Vegas) Vivek Thomas, Sibin Wilson (VTP Studios, Kochi)

Musicians

- Backing vocals: Indu, Lavanya, Narmada, Deepthi Suresh, Padmaja Sreenivasan, Priyanka NK, Gayathry Rajiv
- Vocal supervision: Jishnu Vijayan
- Synth, keys, bass, vintage rhythms: Sai Abhyankkar
- Additional rhythm: Dan Kristen
- Ethnic rhythms: Yanka Rhythm Group
- Acoustic guitar: Chris Jason, Sandeep Mohan
- Bass guitar: Chris Jason, Keba Jeremiah, Derick McArthur, Naveen Napier
- Charango: Keba Jeremiah
- String quartet: Sravan Krishnakumar
- Bulbul Tarang: Sachin Kavithiya
- Shehnai: Balesh, Rudhresh Bajanthri
- Tavil: M. Venkatasubramaniam, Haridwaramangalam A. K. Palanivel, MS Amrithavarshini
- Flute: Ashish Venkateswaran, Kamalakar, Lalit Talluri
- Clarinet: Ashish Venkateswaran, Basanth Muralikrishnan
- Trumpet: Maxwell, Irudayaraj Babu
- Saxophone: Sax Raja
- Sitar: Kishore Kumar
- Mandolin: Viswas Hari
- Harmonies: Aditya Ravindran
- Veena: Haritha Raj
- Percussions: Hariprasad, Vedha, Ranjith, Shruthi Raj, Erai Arasu, Guberan, Krishna Kishor

The Indian Choral Ensemble

- Conductor: Karthik Manickavasakam
- Sopranos: Aparna Harikumar, Rutuja Pande, Nidhi Saraogi, Rajeevi Ganesh, Asvitha Ram, Bavathayini Nagarajan, Fathima Henna
- Altos: Nayansee Sharma, Shri Badhra K A, Ananya A, Kaaviya S, Geethu Nirmala, Prasanthi Keerthivasan
- Tenors: Shridhar Ramesh, Vivin Richards, Karthik P Govind, Shivsundar R, Manikandan Chembai, Advaith Besi, Akash Ravikumar, Ishan Rojindar
- Basses: Prashanth Mohanasundaram, Shyam Krishna, Reevz
- Choir director: Kalyani Nair, Karthik Manickavasakam
- Recording studio: Studio UNO Records
- Recording engineer: Sivasathya R

Budapest String Orchestra

- Conductor: Péter Illényi
- Orchestra Indian representative: Balasubramanian G
- Orchestrators: Abhishek V, Balasubramanian G, Sanjay RA
- Session producer: Bálint Sapszon
- Recording studio: Rottenblier Hall, Budapest
- Engineer: Viktor Szabó, Dénes Rédly
- Studio assistant: Levente Böde
- Librarian: Anna Sapszo, Kati Réti
