= Karuppu =

Karuppu may refer to:

- Karuppannaswamy, a Hindu folk deity
- Karuppu (film), a 2026 Indian film
- Karuppu (soundtrack), soundtrack of the film
