= Attention Please (disambiguation) =

Attention Please is a manga by Chieko Hosokawa about the training of flight attendants.

Attention Please may also refer to:

- Attention Please (Boris album), 2011 dream pop album
- Attention Please (Caroline's Spine album), 1999 alternative rock album
- Attention Please (Ether Bunny album), 2017 experimental jazz album
- Attention Please, a show on NE1FM
- Attention Please (film), an Indian Malayalam-language film
