= Neram (soundtrack) =

Soundtrack album by Rajesh Murugesan
- Released: 3 May 2013
- Recorded: 2009–2013
- Genre: Feature film soundtrack
- Length: 21:48 / 21:50
- Language: Tamil; Malayalam
- Label: Think Music
- Producer: Rajesh Murugesan

Rajesh Murugesan chronology
Neram (2013)	Premam (2015)

Singles from Premam
- 1. "Pistah" Released: 29 March 2013

Neram is the soundtrack album to the 2013 film of the same name directed by Alphonse Puthren starring Nivin Pauly and Nazriya Nazim. The film's musical score and soundtrack were composed by Rajesh Murugesan and featured seven songs written by Puthren, Pradeep Palarr, Velmurugan, Na. Muthukumar, Vijay Joseph, Haricharan and Shabareesh Varma. The Malayalam version featured lyrics by Puthren, Palarr, Santhosh Varma, Joseph and Shabareesh. Both the Tamil and Malayalam versions were released under the Think Music label on 3 May 2013, to positive reviews from critics. The song "Pistah" became a viral hit among youngsters.

== Development ==
Rajesh Murugesan composed the soundtrack and film score of Neram, making his feature film debut. Having previously composed for Puthren's and Karthik Subbaraj's short films, which were telecasted in the reality show Naalaiya Iyakkunar, and through the show, he was offered to compose music for Neram.

Murugesan noted that he had no idea on composing music that appeals to the masses and being a bilingual, it was further difficult to connect to audience with two distinct linguistic sensibilities. However, he added that Puthren entrusted him on the process and provided him freedom. Through the film, he shared a rapport with Shabareesh Varma, one of the cast members, to understand and develop the musical landscape. Murugesan worked for four years on developing the album, admitting that "I had my space and freedom while doing songs for Neram and that was seen in the output". All the songs were performed and penned by relatively new singers, along with popular singers Ranjith, Benny Dayal and Haricharan, also performing for some of the tracks.

The film featured a promotional song "Pistah" which was written and performed by Shabareesh Varma. The gibberish lyrics of the song were taken from a comedy sequence from Sathyan Anthikkad's film Kinnaram (1983), featuring Jagathy Sreekumar. Nivin Pauly stated that the song was a tribute to Sreekumar, who had met with an accident just over a year before its release. Murugesan further adapted Ludwig van Beethoven's piano composition Für Elise as "Thiruttu Isai" (transl. stolen music) and "Moshanam" (transl. stealing) for both the Tamil and Malayalam versions and eventually subtitled as "Beethoven Resurrected".

== Release ==
"Pistah" was released as a promotional video song aired live through music channels and uploaded to video platforms on 29 March 2013 and went viral after its release. The film's soundtrack was launched in both Tamil and Malayalam versions on 3 May 2013 by the Think Music label. The launch of the Tamil album, coincided with an event held at Sathyam Cinemas in Chennai, with the album being unveiled by the film's presenter Udhayanidhi Stalin and music director Anirudh Ravichander, along with the cast and crew.

== Track listing ==
Malayalam
No.	Title	Lyrics	Singer(s)	Length
1.	"Neram Theme"	Alphonse Puthren, Pradeep Palarr	Alphonse Puthren	2:45
2.	"Vaathil Melle"	Santhosh Varma	Sachin Warrier	4:40
3.	"Thaka Thaka"	Santhosh Varma	Shabareesh Varma	3:40
4.	"The Phone Booth"	Vijay Joseph	Vijay Joseph	2:41
5.	"Njan Uyarnu Pokum"	Santhosh Varma	Ranjith	2:58
6.	"Moshanam" (Beethoven Resurrected)	—	—	2:35
7.	"Pistah"	Shabareesh Varma, Jagathy Sreekumar	Shabareesh Varma, Krishna Sankar	2:26
Total length:				21:50

Tamil
No.	Title	Lyrics	Artist(s)	Length
1.	"Neram Theme"	Alphonse Puthren, Pradeep Palarr	Alphonse Puthren	2:40
2.	"Kadhal Ennulle"	Velmurugan	Ranjith	4:41
3.	"Evan Avan"	Na. Muthukumar	Benny Dayal	3:40
4.	"The Phone Booth"	Vijay Joseph	Vijay Joseph	2:43
5.	"Kaatru Veesum"	Haricharan	Haricharan	2:58
6.	"Thiruttu Isai" (Beethoven Resurrected)	—	—	2:35
7.	"Pistah"	Shabareesh Varma, Jagathy Sreekumar	Shabareesh Varma	2:26
Total length:				21:48

== Reception ==
The Times of India gave a statement "The eclectic background score by Rajesh Murugesan adds pep to the movie, as does the use of "Pistah" in the action sequences." A reviewer at Business Standard added that "[the] music by debutant Rajesh Murugesan also gives us a cinematic experience worth every buck." Sify wrote "The music and background score of Rajesh Murugesan is peppy and the Pista track in the end credits has been used well."

== Legacy ==
The song "Pistah" was featured as the promo song for the 9th edition of the Indian Premier League held in 2016.
