= Balti (film) =

- Theatrical release poster
- Directed by: Unni Sivalingam
- Written by: Unni Sivalingam
- Produced by: Santhosh T. Kuruvilla; Binu George Alexander
- Starring: Shane Nigam; Shanthanu Bhagyaraj; Preethi Asrani; Poornima Indrajith
- Cinematography: Alex J. Pulickal
- Edited by: Shivkumar V. Panicker
- Music by: Sai Abhyankkar
- Production companies: STK Frames; Binu George Alexander Productions
- Release date: 26 September 2025
- Running time: 151 minutes
- Country: India
- Language: Malayalam

Balti is a 2025 Indian Malayalam-language action drama film written and directed by Unni Sivalingam (in his directorial debut) Produced by STK Frames and Binu George Alexander Productions, the film stars Shane Nigam, Shanthanu Bhagyaraj, and Preethi Asrani with Alphonse Puthren and Poornima Indrajith in supporting roles. Although the film primarily in Malayalam, it's setting was in the Kerala-Tamil Nadu border, hence the film also contains significant dialogue in Tamil. The film also marked Shanthanu's comeback in Malayalam cinema after 16 years.

The film was officially announced in July 2024 under the tentative title Shane Nigam 25, as it is the actor's 25th film in a leading role, and the official title was announced in June 2025. Principal photography took place from December 2024 to March 2025 across Coimbatore, Palakkad and Pollachi. The film has music composed by Sai Abhyankkar in his feature film debut, with cinematography handled by Alex J. Pulickal and editing by Shivkumar V. Panicker.

Balti was released theatrically on 26 September 2025 and received positive reviews from both critics and audiences, becoming an average success.

== Plot ==
In the town of Velampalayam, illegal finance operations and land dealings are controlled by three influential figures — Porthamarai Bhairavan, Soda Babu and the calculating G-Maa.

Udhayan, also known as Balti, is a passionate kabaddi player who lives with his mother and shares a close bond with his friends Kumar (also called Dash), Ramesh, Mani, and Pratheep. The group gains recognition after defeating Porthamarai Bhairavan's kabaddi team in a local tournament. Humiliated by the defeat, Bhairavan's men attempt to assault the boys but are beaten back.

Impressed by their strength and unity, Bhairavan invites them to represent his Porthamarai team in an upcoming tournament. The boys accept the offer and eventually win the championship title for him. Soon after, Bhairavan's vehicle is seized by Soda Babu's gang following a dispute. Kumar volunteers to retrieve it and successfully confronts Soda Babu's men. Pleased with his loyalty, Bhairavan gifts the vehicle to the group and gradually draws them into his illegal finance network, assigning them to recover loans from borrowers.

As Bhairavan's financial empire expands, a poor borrower is publicly humiliated for failing to repay a high-interest loan. Stripped and shamed before his family, the man attempts suicide by jumping in front of a moving vehicle, resulting in the amputation of his leg. He is later revealed to be the brother of Kaveri, Udhayan's love interest. Enraged by the incident and Kaveri's subsequent threats from Bhairavan's associate Sampath to withdraw the legal complaint, Udhayan turns against Bhairavan.

Meanwhile, Udhayan's mother is attacked by Soda Babu's henchmen. Influenced by G-Maa, who secretly provides him with weapons, Udhayan seeks revenge and kills Soda Babu.

Later, G-Maa warns Kumar that Bhairavan's men are planning an attack on their lodge. Simultaneously, Udhayan receives a call from Murthy informing him that Bhairavan is approaching with a large group and that one among his own friends has been acting as an informer.

Bhairavan's gang storms the lodge, resulting in a violent confrontation. Although Udhayan manages to fight back, Mani and Pratheep are brutally killed during the escape attempt. In the final showdown, Udhayan confronts and kills Porthamarai Bhairavan. However, disillusioned by betrayal, he distances himself from Kumar and walks away.

Kumar is subsequently arrested by the police but secretly contacts G-Maa, urging her not to disclose Udhayan's whereabouts.

The film ends with Udhayan returning to the kabaddi field in search of redemption by joining Kerala Police, while Kumar becomes an enforcer under G-Maa's leadership, hinting at the continuation of the cycle of violence.

== Cast ==
- Shane Nigam as Udhayan
- Shanthanu Bhagyaraj as Kumar
- Shiva Hariharan as Ramesh
- Jeckson Johnson as Mani
- Selvaraghavan as Bhairavan
- Preethi Asrani as Kaveri
- Alphonse Puthren as Soda Babu
- Poornima Indrajith as G-maa
- Kiran Peethambaran as Moorthi
- Dev Habibullah as Muthu
- Akshay Radhakrishnan as Pratheep
- Nitin Thomas as Sambath
- Asha Madathil as Udhayan's mom
- Binu George Alexander as SP Charles Benjamin
- Santhosh as SI Amal
- Vaishnav as Koki
- Sundarapandian as Rathnam
- Vigneshwar Suresh as Vicky
- Sujithra Nair as Kala Akka
- Aju Kizhumala as CI Shakthivel
- Amrutha as Vidhya
- Vishnu Govindan as Satheesh
- Adithya Vembi as Vidhya's and Satheesh's son
- Suparna Sajeesh as Sangeetha
- Nandutti as Sangeetha's daughter
- Liji as Kaveri's mother
- Pramod as Kaveri's father
- Sandeep Narayanan as SI Arjun
- Bitu Thomas as Prasadh
- Anu Varghese as Mahesh
- Suma as Aswin
- Jose Jacob as Bhairavan's lawyer
- Jishnu as Senthil
- Siril Sebastian as Sanal Engineer
- Jaleel as Subhash Annan
- Sreekumar as Bharathi
- Tabu Grace as Savitha
- Rahul as Arun
- Alex as Sravan
- Alvin as Arjun
- Arjun Pulical as Anpu
- Arjun Bhaskar as Arivu
- Dani as Bhairavan's Driver
- Ramya as Ramesh's Sister
- Nithin as Firose
- Sanoop as Faisal
- Chandra Mohan as MP

== Production ==
On 4 July 2024, Shane Nigam announced that his 25th film would be directed by debutant Unni Sivalingam and produced jointly by Santhosh T. Kuruvilla and Binu George Alexander. The film would be shot simultaneously in Malayalam and Tamil. Tentatively titled Shane Nigam 25 and Production No. 14, the technical crew includes cinematographer Alex J. Pulikkal, editor Shivkumar V. Panicker, production designer Ashique S, makeup artist Jitesh Poyya, costume designer Melvi, action choreographer Vicky Master, and sound designer Nithin Lukose.

The official title, Balti, was announced on 11 June 2025. The following month, Sai Abhyankkar was revealed to score the music, in his film debut. Although he had previously signed on for Benz, Karuppu and Dude, this film would release before. In December 2024, Shanthanu Bhagyaraj and Preethi Asrani were announced being cast, with the latter pairing opposite Shane. It marks Shanthanu's comeback in Malayalam cinema after 16 years, following his appearance in 2009 film Angel John. The following July, Alphonse Puthren was announced as the main antagonist. The film, revolving around kabaddi players, was confirmed to feature national and state-level kabaddi players in its cast.

Principal photography began with an inaugural puja ceremony on 12 December 2024 at a film city in Coimbatore with the cast and crew. Filming was set to take place at Coimbatore, Palakkad and Pollachi for around 90 days. Principal photography wrapped by 25 March 2025, with filming having lasted 92 days, as planned.

== Music ==
Balti

Soundtrack album by Sai Abhyankkar
- Recorded: December 2024 – March 2025
- Studios: YOLO Records, Chennai
- Genre: Feature film soundtrack
- Length: 21m 10s
- Languages: Malayalam; Tamil
- Label: Think Music
- Producer: Sai Abhyankkar

Sai Abhyankkar chronology
Balti (2025)	Dude (2025)

Singles from Balti
- 1. "Jaalakaari" Released: 24 August 2025

The soundtrack is composed by Sai Abhyankkar, in his first feature film. His remuneration was around ₹2 crore (equivalent to ₹2.1 crore or US$220,000 in 2026), which Santhosh claimed was the highest for a composer in Malayalam. The audio rights were acquired by Think Music. The track "Soda Break" was featured in the introduction teaser for Alphonse Puthren's character. The first single "Jaalakaari" was released on 24 August 2025.

No.	Title	Lyrics	Singer(s)	Length
1.	"Padakalame"	Vinayak Sasikumar	Sai Abhyankkar, Pranavam Sasi, RANJ	03:54
2.	"Jaalakaari"	Vinayak Sasikumar	Sai Abhyankkar, Sublahshini	03:58
3.	"Thattara Thattara"	Navakkarai Naveen Prabanjam	Sai Abhyankkar, Navakkarai Naveen Prabanjam	03:16
4.	"Vaada Veera"	Vinayak Sasikumar	Sai Abhyankkar, Pranavam Sasi	03:20
5.	"Ammore Senniore"	Malayali Monkeys	Sai Abhyankkar, Malayali Monkeys	03:09
6.	"Soda Break"		Sai Abhyankkar	01:19
7.	"Balti Trailer BOP"		Sai Abhyankkar	02:14
Total length:				21:10

== Release ==
Balti was released theatrically on 26 September 2025. Balti was previously scheduled to release on 29 August coinciding Onam, but was delayed to 26 September due to unknown circumstances.

=== Home Media ===
The film’s post-theatrical streaming rights have been acquired by SonyLIV. After a long gap between its digital premiere and theatrical release, the film was recently announced to premiere on July 10th.

== Nominations and Awards ==
As of 2026 Balti has been nominated three times and has won one award.

Awards:

1. Sai Abhyankkar as 2026 winner for "Jaalakari" in SIIMA- Malayalam. (For Best Playback Singer - Male)

Nominations:

1. Alphonse Puthren as 2026 nominee for best actor in a Comedy Role in SIIMA - Malayalam.

2. Vinayak Sasikumar as 2026 nominee for best lyric writer in SIIMA - Malayalam

3. Sai Abhyankkar as 2026 nominee for best music director in SIIMA - Malayalam.

== Reception ==
=== Critical response ===
Balti received positive reviews from both critics and audiences.

Arjun Menon of The Indian Express gave 3.5/5 stars and wrote, "The personal writing and thick character sketches enhance the immediacy from the action and strengthens the high-stakes plot. The film’s attempts to tap into the emotional core of friendship, and the tragedy triggered by one friend’s poor choices, feel innovative and connected to the rest of the story. Moreover, whenever Balti surrenders to its action instincts, it delivers a good time at the movies". Anna Mathews of The Times of India gave 3/5 stars and wrote, "Balti works well as a sports movie with its well-shot and exciting kabbadi scenes. Also, Sai Abhyankkar makes a striking debut as a film composer".

Janani K of India Today gave 2.5/5 stars and wrote, " 'Balti' serves up promising ingredients and successfully extracts its full potential, thereby settling for creativity over cliches. Vivek Santhosh of Cinema Express gave 2.5/5 stars and wrote, "For those who enjoy rustic action dramas, the film has enough grit and swagger to pass the time. For everyone else, it will feel like a song sung many times before, this time louder, bloodier, and better". Gayathri Krishna of OTTplay gave 2.5/5 stars and wrote, "The action scenes and Sai Abhyankkar's music are among Balti's key assets. For those who love Shane Nigam or a non-commercial action thriller, the film is definitely worthwhile to watch overall".
