= Vishnu Govindan =

Indian actor and film director

- Other name: Vishnu Govindhan
- Alma mater: Cochin University of Science and Technology
- Occupations: Actor; film director
- Years active: 2014–present

Vishnu Govindan is an Indian actor and film director who works mainly in Malayalam cinema and has also appeared in Tamil films. He directed the feature film History of Joy (2017) and the comedy series Kili.

== Early life and education ==
Vishnu is from Kottayam, Kerala. He moved to Kochi to study for a Bachelor of Technology degree at Cochin University of Science and Technology (CUSAT).

== Career ==
Vishnu began in film as an assistant director. He assisted Joshy Mathew on the Malayalam film Black Forest and also worked on the Tamil film Vizhithiru. Earlier, he had worked with director Tom Emmatty on advertising films. His first screen role was in Iyobinte Pusthakam (2014), in which he played the younger version of Chemban Vinod Jose's character.

In 2017 he played a supporting role, in Tom Emmatty's Oru Mexican Aparatha. The role brought him wider attention and further film offers. During a break in that film's shoot, he directed History of Joy, which he co-wrote with Anoop. The film stars Vishnu Vinay, with Vinay Forrt and Saikumar in other roles.

Vishnu played an antagonist in Premasoothram. In Attention Please (2021), directed by Jithin Isaac Thomas, he played his first lead role. The film was selected for the "Malayalam Cinema Today" section of the 2021 International Film Festival of Kerala. He also directed Kili, a comedy series produced by Aju Varghese.

In January 2023 Vishnu joined the cast of Karthik Subbaraj's Tamil film Jigarthanda DoubleX. In 2026 he appeared alongside Vijay Sethupathi in the Tamil film Baththa.

== Filmography ==
- Note: all work is in Malayalam, unless otherwise noted.

=== As film director ===
Year	Title	Notes
2017	History of Joy	

=== As actor ===
Year	Title	Role	Notes
2014	Iyobinte Pusthakam	Young Dimitri	
2017	Oru Mexican Aparatha	Jomy	
2017	Lavakusha	Freddy	
2017	Goodalochana	Sharaf	
2017	Punyalan Private Limited	Gladson	
2017	Vimaanam	Noufal	
2018	Premasoothram	Sukumaran	
2018	Chalakkudikkaran Changathi	Raju	
2018	Vallikudilile Vellakaaran	Vipin	
2019	Oru Caribbean Udayippu	Benson	
2019	Mr. & Ms. Rowdy	Antappan	
2019	Oru Adaar Love	Vicky P. Sebastian	
2021	Maara	Kulfi Guy	Tamil film
2021	Attention Please	Hari	
2022	Pathonpatham Noottandu	Chaathan	
2022	Kuri	Binosh	
2022	Aviyal	Nippi	
2022	Randu	Devadas	
2023	Rekha	Dr. Usman	
2023	Jigarthanda DoubleX	Murugan	Tamil films
2025	Balti	Satheesh	
2026	Baththa	Delhi	Tamil films

=== Streaming television ===
Year	Title	Role	Notes
2020-2021	Kili		Also director
