= Katchi Sera =

Single by Sai Abhyankkar
- Language: Tamil
- Published: 22 January 2024
- Recorded: August 2023
- Studio: YOLO Records, Chennai
- Genre: dance, pop
- Length: 3:05
- Label: Think Indie
- Songwriter: Adesh Krishna
- Composer: Sai Abhyankkar

Sai Abhyankkar singles chronology
"Katchi Sera" (2024)	"Aasa Kooda" (2024)

"Katchi Sera" (transl. To join the party) is a 2024 Tamil-language song and the first independent song composed by Sai Abhyankkar for Think Indie. The song was sung by Abhyankkar, with additional vocals by his sister Sai Smriti, and written by Adesh Krishna.

The song was released on 22 January 2024 as the first single of a contract signed by Abhyankkar for Think Indie. It subsequently became the tenth most searched song and the most searched Tamil song of the year.

== Production ==
According to Sai Abhyankkar, the song was made during one of his casual composing sessions. He made around seven to eight songs in eight days and he felt that Adesh Krishna's lyrics perfectly complemented his lyrics and decided to make "Katchi Sera" an official song. The song is a mix of folk and jazz music. Sai Smriti also performed for the song on the phone in their living room. Abhyankkar subsequently approached Think Indie and they agreed to produce the song. For the music video, Abhyannkkar was inspired by Bruno Mars' "Leave the Door Open" and felt that the song was lush due to the music video compared the song's audio. He was insistent with the music video's director Ken Roysen to make it raw and rustic. Abhyankkar also proposed the idea of a hook step for the music video, which was choreographed by Anusha Viswanathan, and performed by Samyuktha Viswanathan.

== Charts ==
Chart performance for "Katchi Sera"
Chart (2024)	Date	Type	Position	Ref.
Gaana	March 1	Week	1	
Gaana	May 10	Week	3	
Spotify Global Viral Songs	February	—N/a	1	
Hindustan Times Top 10 Indie Songs	2024	Year	9	
Indulge Express Top Tamil Indie Songs	2024	Year	1	
