= Vaazha II: Biopic of a Billion Bros (soundtrack) =

2026 film soundtrack album

Soundtrack album by Malayali Monkeys, Rajat Prakash, Parvatish Pradeep, Rzee, Muthu, Arcado, Jazir Muhammed, Ashwin Aryan and Electronic Kili
- Released: 3 April 2026
- Recorded: 2025–2026
- Studios: WatB Studios, Kochi; VTP Studios, Kochi; SKR Studios, Kochi; Sonic Island, Kochi; CAC Studios, Kochi; Clef House Records, Kochi; Pop Media Studios, Kochi; MLounge, Kochi; Claret's Studio, Karukutty; Coral Studio, Aluva; Sanctuary Audio Visual Studio, Mumbai; Jaura Studios, Jalandhar
- Genre: Feature film soundtrack
- Length: 33:33
- Language: Malayalam
- Label: Think Music

Singles from Vaazha II: Biopic of a Billion Bros
- 1. "Vanilla Chediye" Released: 26 February 2026; 2. "Kochu Keralam" Released: 18 March 2026

Vaazha II: Biopic of a Billion Bros is the soundtrack album to the 2026 Malayalam-language comedy drama film of the same name directed by Savin SA and written and co-produced by Vipin Das, which is the sequel to Vaazha: Biopic of a Billion Boys (2024). The soundtrack featured eleven songs composed by Malayali Monkeys, Rajat Prakash, Parvatish Pradeep, Rzee, Muthu, Arcado, Jazir Muhammed, Ashwin Aryan and Electronic Kili and lyrics written by Prakash, Karthik, Adhri Joe, Muthu, Malayali Monkeys, Vinayak Sasikumar, B. K. Harinarayanan, Shabareesh Varma and Jazir Muhammed. The album was released through Think Music on 3 April 2026.

== Background ==
Vaazha II: Biopic of a Billion Bros featured 10 songs composed by nine musicians, which included Malayali Monkeys, Rajat Prakash, Parvatish Pradeep, Rzee, Muthu, Arcado, Jazir Muhammed, Ashwin Aryan and Electronic Kili. Ankit Menon, a frequent collaborator of Vipin Das, served as the music supervisor as he did for the sequel and the background score was credited to their team composers under the "A Team". Parvatish Pradeep composed the emotional track "Koodappirannor" which highlighted the bond between siblings. Likewise B. K. Harinarayanan was also invited to write the lyrics for the song; the lyricist had previously collaborated for "Makane" for the predecessor and Sooraj Santhosh who sang that song, was also joined to croon that number. Parvatish said that he had watched the visuals of the film, so that he had received the context and had to find the emotional space between them.

During discussions, the team were clear that the composers should not make the music similar to "Makane" and had to feel like its own independent piece. With numerous discussions between the emotional weight, melody and lyrics, Pradeep said that he was drawn from his own relationship from his brother while composing the tune, adding that he also sent the tune which connected with him immediately and that provided him the confidence to compose the tune. After the response for the song, Pradeep created a mashup of this song with "Makane" which went viral on reels and social platforms adding that it connected with the audiences. Electronic Kili also performed a reimagined version of "Eey Banane" from the first film. Likewise each composers had contributed to one song for the film, while Muthu had did two songs as a composer.

== Release ==
The first song "Vanilla Chediye" was released on 26 February 2026. The second song "Kochu Keralam" was released on 18 March. The full soundtrack was released on 3 April.

== Reception ==
Gopika Is of The Times of India wrote "The music is spot on and adds to the overall feel of the film." S. R. Praveen of The Hindu wrote "The background score and the songs by a team of artists led by Ankit Menon, go a long way in elevating many of these sequences". Anandu Suresh of The Indian Express noted that the music too deserved commendation, while praising the makers intention to not use hit tracks from the prequel, and added that "Makane" from the predecessor, "plays at the right moment, after teasing for long, it hits a home run". Vivek Santhosh of The New Indian Express felt the music did not "quite match up to the first instalment’s memorable album" except for "Vannilla Chediye" and the utilization of earlier tracks from the prequel, "remind[ed] [the audience] of what worked better before". Sanjay Ponnappa of India Today wrote "The music, songs, and especially the background score by A Team are simply outstanding." Sreeju Sudhakaran of Rediff.com wrote "Though there are perhaps one too many songs, they gel well with the narrative".

== Track listing ==
No.	Title	Lyrics	Music	Singer(s)	Length
1.	"Vanilla Chediye"	Rajat Prakash	Rajat Prakash	Rajat Prakash, Dilrooh, Nila Raj, Sathwika	2:47
2.	"Ada Bommale"	Heykarthi	Rzee	Rzee, Chinmayi Kiranlal, Minya Panicker, Nila Raj	3:00
3.	"Aaja Raja"	Adhri Joe	Ashwin Aryan	Ashwin Aryan, Electronic Kili, Adhri Joe	3:01
4.	"Sunnath Kalyanam"	Muthu	Muthu	Muthu	2:51
5.	"Thooki"	Shabareesh Varma	Arcado	Maalavika Sundar	4:38
6.	"Kochu Keralam"	Malayali Monkeys	Malayali Monkeys	Malayali Monkeys	2:33
7.	"Lovely Vaazha"	Jazir Muhammed	Jazir Muhammed	Asha Jeevan	3:32
8.	"Paazha"	Muthu	Muthu	Adwaith R Rajesh	2:48
9.	"Koodappirannor"	B. K. Harinarayanan	Parvatish Pradeep	Sooraj Santhosh, Nila Raj	4:04
10.	"Eey Banane Reimagined"	Vinayak Sasikumar	Electronic Kili	Electronic Kili	2:54
11.	"Makane x Koodappirannor"	B. K. Harinarayanan	Parvatish Pradeep	Sooraj Santhosh	1:21
Total length:					33:33

== Personnel ==
Credits adapted from Think Music:

- Music composers: Malayali Monkeys, Rajat Prakash, Parvatish Pradeep, Rzee, Muthu, Arcado, Jazir Muhammed, Ashwin Aryan, Electronic Kili
- Music producers: Malayali Monkeys, Rajat Prakash, Ashwin Aryan, Rzee, Sreerag Suresh, Arcado, Tjus, Asha Jeevan
- Musical arrangements: Malayali Monkeys, Rajat Prakash, Vishnu Das, Rzee, Ashwin Aryan, Sreerag Suresh, Arcado, Asha Jeevan
- Studios: WatB Studios, Kochi; VTP Studios, Kochi; SKR Studios, Kochi; Sonic Island, Kochi; CAC Studios, Kochi; Clef House Records, Kochi; Pop Media Studios, Kochi; MLounge, Kochi; Claret's Studio, Karukutty; Coral Studio, Aluva; Sanctuary Audio Visual Studio, Mumbai; Jaura Studios, Jalandhar
- Recording engineer: Abhiraman, Akshay Kakkoth Vivek Thomas, Rohan Harish, Sreerag Suresh, Vedant Uttarkar, Rohan Harish, Arjun B Nair, Amal Raj, Allen, Omkaradas OS, Vinod PT, Abhinav M K, Nikhil Mathews
- Mixing engineer: Tjus, Ashbin Paulson, Vishnu Raj M R, Vivek Thomas, Subhajit Pandit, Sibin Wilson, Midhun Anand, Vinay Sridhar, Abin Paul
- Mastering engineer: Ashbin Paulson, Vishnu Raj M R, Vivek Thomas, Midhun Anand, Vinay Sridhar, Abin Paul
- Music production manager: Adarsh Mullakulamthil
- Music coordinator: KD Vincent

Musicians

- Chorus: Rajat Prakash, Dilrooh, Vishnu Das, Mariya Laly Johny, Escape Violet, Abhiraman, Ankit Menon, Arcado, Parvatish Pradeep, Shahal Sidheek, Shihad, Abhay Rajeev, Sreenandhan Vinu, Stevin Shanty, Lena Liju, Joan Mariyam Paul, Evain Elsa Albino, Evania Ann Albino, Christlin Andrin, Anna Sony Roy, Medha Ganesh, Shrita Ganesh, Nila Raj, Chinmayi Kiran, Vasudev
- Backing vocals: Dr Haritha Haribabu
- Vocal tuning: Dhaliya Navas
- Flute: Shyam Adat, Subin Jerson
- Clarinet: Shyam Adat, Jose E Lonan, St. Mary's Bandset
- Guitar: Aditya Arjun, Durwin D’souza, CeeVee, Sandeep Mohan
- Electric guitar: Shatarchi Hundet
- Bass guitar: Josy John, CeeVee, Ancin Godfred
- Bass: Michael Timothy, CeeVee, Sandeep Mohan
- Tumbi, tumba: Navneet Jaura
- Oud, bouzouki, frets: Sanu PS
- Veena: Sachin Balu
- Drums: Muhamed Mufeed J
- Brass, horns: Rahul Joshua Thomas, Rakesh, Basanth
- Dholak, dholki and ethnic percussions: Suresh Krishnan
- Harmonium: Pranav Pradeep
- Nadaswaram: Anandhu Krishna Jalaja
- Trumpet: Jose Prakash, St. Mary's Bandset
- Trombone: St. Mary's Bandset
- Strings quartet: Sravan Krishnakumar
- Sitar: Paulson K J
- Melodyne: Vishnu CV
