= Santhosh T. Kuruvilla =

Indian film producer

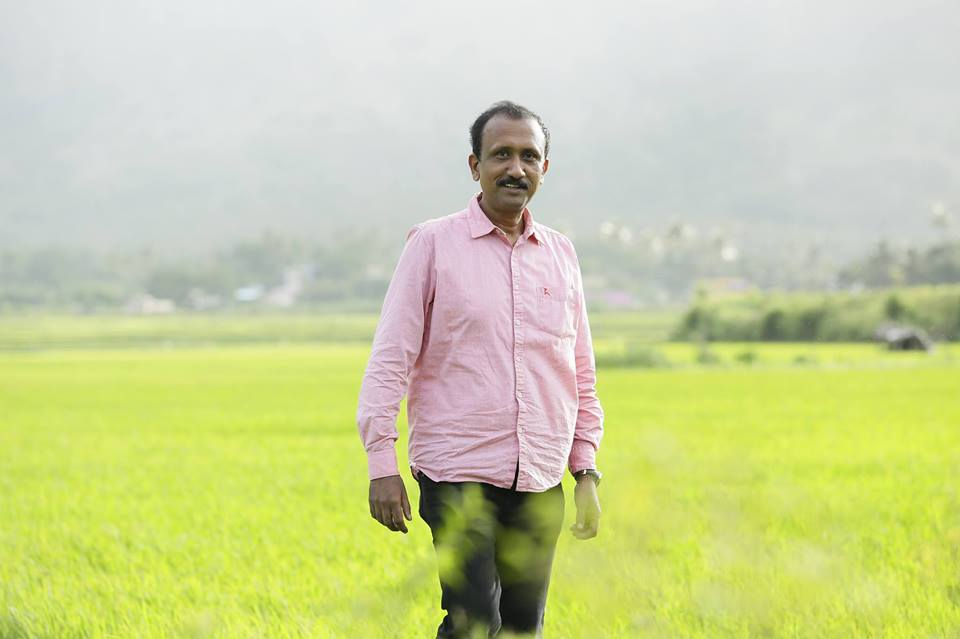
- Born: 4 July 1971 (age 55)
- Occupations: Film Producer; Business Man
- Years active: 2012-Present
- Organisation(s): Moonshot Entertainments; OPM Dream Mill Cinemas
- Spouse: Nansy Santhosh
- Children: 3

Santhosh T. Kuruvilla (born 4 July 1971) is an Indian Film producer who has funded films in the Malayalam and Tamil Film Industries. He is the Managing Director of Moonshot Entertainments and Chairman of OPM Dream Mills Cinemas. He also owns a chain of business enterprises based on India and UAE. Also invested in rock quarries in Coimbatore and Marble quarry in Botswana.

== Career ==
Santhosh began a chain of restaurants under 'GudFud' and 'Gusto Food'. He is also one among the directors of the cafe 'Donut Factory'.

Santhosh is the Executive Director and General Manager of Horeitia Global, a construction company in Qatar. He is also the director of Techno Steel, a steel fabrication unit based in Dubai. Besides these roles, he is also the managing director of a music and art initiative in Doha, named Music Lounge and the chairman of an Indian software consultancy named Techno Valley.

== Filmography ==
| Year | Title | Production company | Notes |
|---|---|---|---|
| 2012 | Da Thadiya | Anto Joseph Film Company and OPM Cinemas | Co-produced with Anto Joseph |
| 2014 | Gangster | OPM Cinemas | Co-produced with Aashiq Abu |
| 2016 | Maheshinte Prathikaaram | OPM Cinemas | Co-produced with Aashiq Abu |
| 2017 | Mayaanadhi | OPM Cinemas | Co-produced with Aashiq Abu |
| 2018 | Nimir | Moonshot Entertainments | |
| 2018 | Ee.Ma.Yau. | OPM Cinemas and R.G.K Cinema | Co-produced with Rajesh George Kulangara and Aashiq Abu |
| 2018 | Neerali | Moonshot Entertainments | Co-produced with Praveen Kattukaran and Mibu Jose Nettikadan |
| 2019 | Virus | OPM Cinemas | Co-produced with Aashiq Abu and Rima Kallingal |
| 2019 | Android Kunjappan Version 5.25 | Moonshot Entertainments | |
| 2021 | Aarkkariyam | OPM Cinemas | Co-produced with Aashiq Abu |
| 2021 | Marakkar: Lion of the Arabian Sea | Aashirvad Cinemas, Confident Group and Moonshot Entertainments | Co-produced with Antony Perumbavoor and Roy C.J |
| 2022 | Naradan | OPM Cinemas | Co-produced with Aashiq Abu and Rima Kallingal |
| 2022 | Nna Thaan Case Kodu | STK Frames, Udaya Pictures | Co-produced with Kunchako Boban and Sherin Rachel Santhosh |
| 2025 | Balti | STK Frames, Binu George Alexander Productions | Co-produced with Binu George Alexander |
| 2026 | Pennum Porattum | STK Frames | Co-produced with Binu George Alexander |
