= Deepthi Suresh =

Indian singer

- Born: c. 1995
- Origin: Tamil Nadu, India
- Genre: Playback singing
- Occupation: Singer

Deepthi Suresh is an Indian Playback singer live performer. She has been nominated for Filmfare Award for Best Female Playback Singer in 2024. She works primarily in Tamil, in addition to few Hindi. She is known for her songs in Jawan (2023), Vettaiyan (2024).

She was a contestant in the popular Vijay TV show, Super Singer in 2013.

== Discography ==
Deepthi Suresh has been a playback singer for various films in various languages.

=== List of Tamil songs ===
Year	Film title	Song title	Composer	Co-singer(s)	Notes	Ref
2018	Kanaa	Vaayadi Petha Pulla	Dhibu Ninan Thomas	Aaradhana Sivakarthikeyan, Vaikom Vijayalakshmi, Sivakarthikeyan	Background Chorus Singer	
2021	Maara	Unnaithaane	Ghibran Vaibodha			
2021	Kasada Tabara	Irai Thandha	Ghibran Vaibodha		Streaming release	
2022	Maha	Hey Edhiriye (Happy Version)	Ghibran Vaibodha			
2022	Koogle Kuttappa	Alai Alai	Ghibran Vaibodha	G. V. Prakash Kumar		
2023	Pathu Thala	Osarattum Pathu Thala	A. R. Rahman	Sreekanth Hariharan, Sathyaprakash		
2023	Maamannan	Kodi Parakura Kaalam	A. R. Rahman	Kalpana Raghavendar, Rakshita Suresh, Aparna Harikumar		
2023	Maamannan	Utchanthala	A. R. Rahman	Sireesha Bhaguvatula, Pavithra Chari		
2023	Jawan	Aararaari Raaro	Anirudh Ravichander			
2024	Lal Salaam	Thimiri Yezhuda	A. R. Rahman	Bamba Bakya, Shahul Hameed, Akshaya Shivkumar		
2024	Lal Salaam	Ther Thiruvizha	A. R. Rahman	Shankar Mahadevan, A. R. Raihanah, Yogi Sekar		
2024	Rathnam	Sengamalam	Devi Sri Prasad	Abinaya Shenbagaraj, Sushmita Narasimhan, Padmaja Sreenivasan		
2024	Vettaiyan	Manasilaayo	Anirudh Ravichander	Malaysia Vasudevan, Yugendran Vasudevan, Anirudh Ravichander		
2024	Petta Rap	Athirattum Dum	D. Imman	D. Imman		
2024	Devara: Part 1	Paththavaikkum	Anirudh Ravichander	Vignesh Shivan	Dubbed version	
2024	Kanguva	Fire Song	Devi Sri Prasad	V. M. Mahalingam, Senthil Ganesh, Shenbagaraj		
2025	Dude	Oorum Blood	Sai Abhyankkar	Sai Abhyankkar, Paal Dabba, Bebhumika		
2025	Genie	Abdi Abdi	A. R. Rahman	Mayssa Karaa, Freek		
2025	Rambo	Mayakkam Enna	Ghibran Vaibodha			
2026	Kadhal Reset Repeat	Halo Halo	Harris Jayaraj	Nikhita Gandhi		
2026	Jailer 2	Ala Bolelo, Bindaas	Anirudh Ravichander	Anirudh Ravichander		

=== List of other language songs ===
Year	Film title	Song title	Composer	Co-singer(s)	Language	Notes	Ref
2023	Jawan	Aararaari Raaro	Anirudh Ravichander	Solo	Hindi		
2023	Jawan	Aararaari Raaro	Anirudh Ravichander	Solo	Telugu	Dubbed versions	
2023	Jawan	Nallaani Cheekatilo	Anirudh Ravichander	Solo	Telugu	Dubbed versions	
2023	12th Fail	Cheppava	Shantanu Moitra	S. P. Abhishek, Suresh Banishetty	Telugu	Dubbed versions	
2024	AGR	Nazrein Jhulka	A. R. Rahman	Sarath Santhosh, Aravind Srinivas	Telugu	Dubbed versions	
2024	Vettaiyan	Manasilaayo	Anirudh Ravichander	Nakash Aziz, Arun Kaundinya	Telugu	Dubbed versions	
2024	Vettaiyan	Manasilaayo	Anirudh Ravichander	Nakash Aziz, Arun Kaundinya	Hindi	Dubbed versions	
2024	Vettaiyan	Manasilaayo	Anirudh Ravichander	Nakash Aziz, Arun Kaundinya	Kannada	Dubbed versions	
2024	Kanguva	Naayaka	Devi Sri Prasad	Aravind Srinivas, Deepak Blue, Shenbagaraj, Narayanan Ravishankar, Govind Prasad, Shibi Srinivasan, Prasanna Adhisesha, Vikram Pitty, Abhijith Rao, Aparna Harikumar, Sushmita Narasimhan, Pavithra Chari, Lavita Lobo, Latha Krishna, Padmaja Sreenivasan, Sai Sharan	Telugu	Dubbed versions	
2025	Dude	"Oorum Blood"	Sai Abhyankkar	Sai Abhyankkar, Bebhumika	Telugu	Dubbed versions	

== Awards and nominations ==
Year	Award	Category	Work	Result	Ref.
2024	Filmfare Awards	Best Female Playback Singer	Jawan	Nominated	
2024	International Indian Film Academy Awards	Best Female Playback Singer	Jawan	Nominated	
2024	Mirchi Music Awards	Upcoming Female Vocalist of the Year	Jawan	Won	
2025	Filmfare Awards South	Best Female Playback Singer - Tamil	Vettaiyan	Nominated	
2025	South Indian International Movie Awards	Best Female Playback Singer - Tamil	Vettaiyan	Nominated	

== See also ==
- List of Indian playback singers
