= Vaayai Moodi Pesavum (soundtrack) =

Soundtrack album by Sean Roldan
- Released: 21 March 2014
- Recorded: 2014
- Genre: Feature film soundtrack
- Length: 22:27
- Language: Tamil
- Label: Think Music
- Producer: Sean Roldan

Sean Roldan chronology
Vaayai Moodi Pesavum (2014)	Mundasupatti (2014)

Vaayai Moodi Pesavum is the soundtrack album to the 2014 film of the same name directed by Balaji Mohan and stars Dulquer Salmaan and Nazriya Nazim. The film score and soundtrack were composed by independent musician Sean Roldan in his feature film debut. The album accompanied eight tracks; five songs and three Instrumentals. Balaji Mohan, Muthamil and Madhan Karky wrote lyrics for the Tamil version, while its Malayalam version Samsaaram Aarogyathinu Haanikaram featured lyrics by Anu Elizabeth Jose and Santhosh Varma.

== Development ==
Initially, Anirudh Ravichander was reported to compose music for the film, but later opted out of the project. Later, the team chose Sean Roldan to compose the score and soundtrack. Previously Roldan signed C. V. Kumar's production Mundasupatti (2014) as his first project. But upon the insistence of producers S. Sashikanth and Varun Manian, Kumar recommended Roldan's name to them.

Roldan stated that he watched Balaji's debut Kadhalil Sodhappuvadhu Yeppadi (2012) and liked the concept. He recalled that he and Balaji shared similar sensibilities about music. While composing the title track, both Roldan and Balaji sung the track together and complimented his singing abilities. He insisted him to record vocals for the track to which Balaji agreed. While writing the script, Balaji referenced the song "Mayakkura Poo Vaasam"—which Roldan had performed with his band (Sean Roldan and Friends)—for "Kadhal Ara Onnu".

Roldan composed and recorded the songs within three days as the team had to go out of the city to shoot the songs. The background score was recorded by the Chennai Strings Orchestra, which performed three instrumental tracks for the film. The re-recording was completed by late March 2014.

== Release ==
The audio rights were secured by Think Music. The music for the film's Tamil version was released on 21 March 2014, at a launch event held in Sathyam Cinemas, Chennai. The event saw the attendance of the cast and crew, along with directors Mani Ratnam, Selvaraghavan, Vasanthabalan, producers T. Siva, S. R. Prabhu, C. V. Kumar, actors Vikram Prabhu, Rana Daggubati, Ashwin Kakumanu, singer Vijay Yesudas and former Tamil Film Producers Council president Keyaar. Mani Ratnam released the audio CD which was handed over to Rana Daggubati, while Keyaar launched the film's theatrical trailer. The soundtrack for the Malayalam version Samsaaram Aarogyathinu Haanikaram was released on 11 April 2014.

== Track listing ==
=== Tamil ===
Vaayai Moodi Pesavum
No.	Title	Lyrics	Singer(s)	Length
1.	"Shut up! Vaaya Moodu! Pesadhe!"	Balaji Mohan	Sean Roldan, Balaji Mohan	2:21
2.	"Kadhal Ara Onnu Vizundhuchu"	Muthamil	Sean Roldan, Shakthisree Gopalan	3:49
3.	"Mr Fix-It" (Theme)	—	Instrumental	2:31
4.	"Podhum Nee Ini Varundhadhe"	Muthamil	Haricharan	4:36
5.	"Udaigiren Udaigiren"	Madhan Karky	Aalap Raju	2:29
6.	"Beedhiya Kelappa" (Jazz Theme)	—	Instrumental	1:55
7.	"The Sound of Silence" (Theme)	—	Instrumental	1:59
8.	"Maatra Paravai"	Madhan Karky	Pradeep Kumar, Kalyani Nair	2:57
Total length:				22:27

=== Malayalam ===
Samsaaram Aarogyathinu Haanikaram
No.	Title	Lyrics	Singer(s)	Length
1.	"Shut up! Vaaya Moodu! Mindathe!"	Anu Elizabeth Jose	Sean Roldan, Balaji Mohan	2:21
2.	"Thammil Oru"	Santhosh Varma	Sean Roldan, Shakthisree Gopalan	3:49
3.	"Mr.Fix-It" (Theme)	—	Instrumental	2:31
4.	"Ullin Ullile"	Santhosh Varma	Haricharan	4:36
5.	"Kaana Kanneerilay"	Anu Elizabeth Jose	Aalap Raju	2:29
6.	"Pedipeduthunna" (Jazz Theme)	—	Instrumental	1:55
7.	"The Sound of Silence" (Theme)	—	Instrumental	1:59
8.	"Swaathanthryathin Thaalangal"	Anu Elizabeth Jose	Pradeep Kumar, Kalyani Nair	2:57
Total length:				22:27

== Reception ==
Karthik Srinivasan of Milliblog wrote, "Sean Roldan's musical debut is as eclectic and interesting as the man's diverse musical sensibilities!" S. R. Ashok Kumar of The Hindu wrote "Composer Sean Roldan has tried to give different kinds of songs and also succeeded in it". S. Saraswathi of Rediff.com summarized "The music by debutant, Sean Roldan, keeps up with the tempo of the film, especially the BGM, which plays a crucial role in the second half." Sify wrote "Sean Roldan's music is in groove with the plot, especially the BGM in the second half."

IANS wrote "Sean Roldan keeps the film alive with his music and knows how to use it as a narrative, especially in the second half that hardly has any dialogues." Malini Mannath of The New Indian Express summarized "The silent portions give enough scope for an expressive musical score, Sean Roldan's BGM sustaining the feel." Nandita Ravi of Deccan Chronicle summarized "Sean Rolden's music needs special mention as the entire film post the interval, comes alive – thanks to his BGM."
