= Nimir =

2018 film by Priyadarshan

- Theatrical release poster
- Directed by: Priyadarshan
- Screenplay by: P. Samuthirakani (dialogues)
- Based on: Maheshinte Prathikaaram by Syam Pushkaran
- Produced by: Santhosh T. Kuruvilla
- Starring: Udhayanidhi Stalin; Namitha Pramod
- Cinematography: N. K. Ekambaram
- Edited by: M. S. Ayyappan Nair
- Music by: Original songs: Darbuka Siva; B. Ajaneesh Loknath; Background score: Ronnie Raphael
- Production company: Moonshot Entertainment
- Distributed by: Red Giant Movies
- Release date: 26 January 2018
- Running time: 131 minutes
- Country: India
- Language: Tamil

Nimir (transl. Arise) is a 2018 Indian Tamil-language comedy drama film directed by Priyadarshan, starring Udhayanidhi Stalin and Namitha Pramod. It is a remake of the 2016 Malayalam-language film Maheshinte Prathikaaram, with changes made to the screenplay to suit the cultural and regional tastes of Tamil audiences. The film revolves around a man who, after being beaten up, swears revenge and vows not to wear slippers until he has achieved his goal. It was released on 26 January 2018.

== Plot ==
"National" Selvam is a small-time photographer who lives with his father "National" Shanmugham. They run a digital photography studio in Tenkasi. Next to the studio is a flex-board printing shop owned by Selvam's friend Sadha. His assistant Vigadakavi designs the flex-boards. Selvam is in a relationship with Shenbaghavalli, his high school sweetheart.

Sadha becomes involved in a trivial argument with a loafer in the centre of the town. The dispute escalates, but passersby calm them down. However, Vigadakavi appears and attacks the man who had argued with Sadha. The man, joined by a ruffian Vellaiyappan, jumps on Vigadakavi in retaliation. Noticing the commotion, Selvam tries to calm everyone down, but Vellaiyappan, furious at Selvam's authoritative stance, beats him up. Shanmugham breaks up the fight. Embarrassed, Selvam vows to get back at Vellaiyappan and pledges that he will not wear slippers until he has avenged his humiliation.

Shenbaghavalli is forced to end her relationship with Selvam, who learns about Vellaiyappan's whereabouts from Vigadakavi and visits the garage where he apparently works as a welder. Its owner tells him that Vellaiyappan left for a better job in Dubai. Despite Sadha's advice that he should forget the incident, Selvam resolves to wait for Vellaiyappan's return; several weeks later, he enrolls in a kung fu course.

Malarvizhi, a college student, goes to Selvam's studio. She tells Selvam that she wants to participate in a women's magazine's cover photo competition and asks him to make her look as good as possible. Perplexed at the unusual request, Selvam conducts the photoshoot. Malar's photograph turns out to be unimpressive, and her irritation makes Selvam question his skill as a photographer. Upset, he turns to his father for advice. Shanmugham explains photography as an art to his son. Selvam goes through his father's photograph collection, finally understanding their angles and lighting, and gets an idea.

Instead of his familiar still photography, Selvam photographs Malar in motion and sends the best photo to the magazine. Shortly afterward, Malar goes to Selvam's house with the magazine containing her photo. Although she rebukes him for photographing her without permission, she also praises the photo. They become interested in each other and soon fall in love. Malar realises this first and calls Selvam to talk about their future. She tells him that she is Vellaiyappan's younger sister, but his agitation is overshadowed by love and he decides to continue their relationship.

Several weeks later, Vellaiyappan is fired from his job for slapping his manager and is deported back to India. The following day, Selvam and Sadha challenge him to a hand-to-hand combat. After a few minutes of fighting, Selvam pins down Vellaiyappan, and Sadha declares him the winner. Selvam visits Vellaiyappan in a hospital the next day and introduces himself to his mother in front of Malar. He admits his love for Malar and asks Vellaiyappan for his sister's hand in marriage, as Vellaiyappan and his mother look at each other in disbelief. In the credits, Selvam is seen uniting with Malar.

== Cast ==
- Udhayanidhi Stalin as "National" Selvam
- Namitha Pramod as Malarvizhi (Malar)
- Parvati Nair as Shenbagavalli (Valli)
- P. Samuthirakani as Vellaiyappan
- Mahendran as "National" Shanmugham, Selvam's father
- Karunakaran as Vigadakavi
- M. S. Bhaskar as Sadhanandham
- George Maryan as Subramani
- Shanmugarajan as Pitchumani
- Tulasi as Malarvizhi's mother
- Maala Parvathi as Shenbaghavalli's mother
- Aruldoss as Gopi
- Ganja Karuppu as Sadha's brother-in-law
- Manikuttan as Shenbaghavalli's husband
- Imman Annachi as Annachi
- Sendrayan as Auto Driver
- Sampath Ram as Inspector
- KS Suchitra Shetty as Annachi's wife
- Nadiya Kalhara as Vidhya
- Bineesh Kodiyeri as Malaisamy
- Rajkumar as Palaniyappan

== Production ==
In June 2017, it was announced that the 2016 Malayalam film Maheshinte Prathikaaram would be remade in Tamil with Priyadarshan as director and Udhayanidhi Stalin as the lead actor. Priyadarshan made changes to the screenplay to suit the cultural and regional tastes of Tamil audiences. P. Samuthirakani penned the dialogues and also played the antagonist. The title Nimir was suggested by Mahendran who plays Udhayanidhi's father in the film. The title was accepted and acknowledged by Priyadarshan. The film was produced by Santhosh T. Kuruvilla under his banner Moonshot Entertainment.

Udhayanidhi was Priyadarshan's only choice for playing Selvam, the male lead. Malayalam actress Namitha Pramod was cast as the female lead character Malarvizhi, making her debut in Tamil cinema. She stated that, despite being familiar with Tamil, she chose not to dub her own lines because her lines "required [her] to talk fast and had difficult words." Parvati Nair was cast as Selvam's childhood love interest Valli, reprising the role originally played by Anusree. The character was changed from a nurse to a college student. N. K. Ekambaram handled the cinematography. Principal photography began in July 2017, and lasted for approximately 36 days; the film in its entirety was shot in Tenkasi except for a short bit in Dubai.

== Music ==
The film score was composed by Ronnie Raphael, while the songs featured in the film were composed by Darbuka Siva and B. Ajaneesh Loknath. The song "Nenjil Maamazhai", sung by Haricharan and Shweta Mohan, was released as a single on 19 December 2017, while the rest of the album was released on 18 January 2018.

Track listing
No.	Title	Lyrics	Music	Singer(s)	Length
1.	"Poovukku"	Vairamuthu	Darbuka Siva	Shweta Mohan	5:10
2.	"Vaazhum Valluvarae"	Mohan Rajan	Darbuka Siva	V. Priyadarshini, R. Apoorva, N. Aparajitha, Jyothsna Akilan	0:51
3.	"Epodhum Unmael Nyabagam"	Thamarai	B. Ajaneesh Loknath	Vijay Prakash	4:51
4.	"Nenjil Mamazhai"	Thamarai	B. Ajaneesh Loknath	Haricharan, Shweta Mohan	4:38
5.	"Yaenadi"	Mohan Rajan	Darbuka Siva	Haricharan	6:07
6.	"Geedhaara Kiliye"	Mohan Rajan	Darbuka Siva	Sathyaprakash	5:04
Total length:					26:41

== Release and reception ==
Nimir was released on 26 January 2018, and was distributed by Udhayanidhi's company Red Giant Movies. Sify called the film a "faithful remake" of Maheshinte Prathikaaram that would work for those audiences who did not see the Malayalam original. M. Suganth of The Times of India rated it 2.5 out of 5. Vishal Menon of The Hindu wrote, "It might be an easy watch for first-timers, but for those who've watched the original, Nimir feels blasphemous".
