= Baththa =

2026 film directed by Balaji Tharaneetharan

- Theatrical release poster
- Directed by: Balaji Tharaneetharan
- Written by: Balaji Tharaneetharan
- Produced by: Murad Khetani; Atlee; Priya Atlee; Alok Jain; Ajit Andhare
- Starring: Vijay Sethupathi; Lijomol Jose
- Cinematography: Selvakumar S. K.
- Edited by: R. Kalaivanan
- Music by: Sai Abhyankkar
- Production companies: Cine1 Studios; A for Apple Studios; Star Studio18
- Distributed by: see below
- Release date: 1 October 2026
- Running time: 158 minutes
- Country: India
- Language: Tamil
- Budget: est. ₹28 crore
- Box office: est. ₹33.16 crore

Baththa is a 2026 Indian Tamil-language comedy drama film written and directed by Balaji Tharaneetharan and produced by Cine1 Studios, A for Apple Studios and Star Studio18. The film stars Vijay Sethupathi in the titular role, with Lijomol Jose, Hari Krishnan, Arjun Chidambaram, Vishnu Govindan, Santhy Balachandran, Sai Prithviraj and Sahasra Shree in pivotal roles. It follows a dreaded gangster who is accidentally locked in a school bathroom and the effects it has on his life.

The film was officially announced in August 2026, by which point filming was already complete. The music was composed by Sai Abhyankkar, cinematography was handled by Selvakumar S. K. and editing by R. Kalaivanan.

Baththa was released in theatres on 1 October 2026 and received critical acclaim. Despite a slow start, the film emerged a box office success, grossing ₹33.16 crore (US$3.5 million) crore worldwide.

== Plot ==
In 1986 Madras, Baththavachalam "Baththa" is a ruthless and dreaded local gangster. He commands total authority on the streets by instilling deep fear in everyone around him. Sabari is a young boy in the same neighbourhood. He witnesses Baththa brutally assaulting an enemy Jyoti and is terrified of him. Baththa is affectionate towards his tween daughter Themozhi "Thenu", but frequently mistreats his wife Kannima.

Sabari's toy is confiscated by his teacher right before the start of summer vacation. He overhears that the school security guard had been hospitalised and breaks into the school after the holidays start, at dawn to secretly retrieve the toy. After using the toilet, he promptly locks the bathroom and is terrified when someone knocks from the inside. He freezes with fear when the locked person identifies himself as Baththa, and threatens to kill whoever locked him up. Sabari runs away in fear, while Baththa contemplates which one of his enemies would have locked him up.

Sabari returns to the bathroom with some rusks, crushes and feed them through the door creek. For several days, Baththa only threatens him with violence, thinking he is being held by one of his opponents. A few days later, Baththa relents and begs to be set free, promising he will not cause any harm. Sabari, still being shaken by fear, only feeds him rusks, without speaking a word.

One day Sabari's mother asks him to get ready to leave to their native town. Worried that nobody would be there to give Baththa food, he gathers the courage to set Baththa free, but is shocked to find him lying in a paralysed state in the water tank, the victim of a snake bite. He calls out for help and Baththa is saved. Baththa's men identify Sabari as Baththa's rescuer. He tells everyone that he broke into the school to retrieve his toy and found Baththa. Baththa and his family shower him with love. Baththa apologises to Kannima for his past behaviour and starts treating her with respect.

Baththa devises a plan to find his "kidnapper": inviting each of his opponents to Thenu's puberty ceremony and finding the perpetrator through their body language. He concludes that none of his opponents were behind his captivity.

Sabari grows closer to Baththa and his family. They buy him new clothes, take him to dinner and to the movies. He however remains anxious and frightened about being identified as the one who locked Baththa in. Sabari sees Baththa's more caring and protective side, when Baththa thrashes a co-worker of Sabari's father, for assaulting him.

Baththa's henchmen deduce that the culprit is a young boy. The shopkeeper from whom Sabari purchased rusks to feed Baththa during his captivity, is sought out and asked to identify the boy. Sabari narrowly avoids being identified.

Closer to Thenu's ceremony, Sabari and Baththa take a bike ride together, where the shopkeeper remembers Sabari, but when Baththa says he is with him, the shopkeeper does not connect Sabari as the boy who bought rusks daily. However, Sabari eventually reveals the truth to Baththa, choking up with tears but Baththa fondly hugs him. Jyoti considers Baththa's invitation an insult and attempts to kill him. Baththa overpowers him but does not kill him. Sabari questions Baththa why he was in the school bathroom, and he tells him the truth.

In his childhood, Baththa loved singing, but was bad at it and was constantly ridiculed by his friends. Once he became a gangster, he used the terror to get back at people who would mock him. He decided to sing at his daughter's ceremony and since the school was closed for summer holidays, he realised he could use it as a place to practise, but Sabari locked him in when he went to use its toilet. Sabari encourages Baththa to sing in Thenu's ceremony, suggesting to him to complete his song. He sings a song for his daughter, and though the crowd is initially unimpressed with his singing, they eventually see his sincerity and love and applaud him. Baththa finds Sabari in the audience and hugs him.

== Cast ==
- Vijay Sethupathi as Baththavachalam "Baththa"
- Lijomol Jose as Kannima
- Hari Krishnan as Thirunavukarasu
- Arjun Chidambaram as Jyoti
- Ajay Ghosh as Pedda Kondaiah
- Kavin Jay Babu as the police inspector
- Vishnu Govindan as Delhi
- Balamurugan
- Maruthu Pandian as the rusk seller
- Santhy Balachandran as Selvi (voice dubbed by Sumithra Devi L)
- Deepa Venkat as Lachamma, Pedda Kondaiah's wife
- Indumathy
- Sai Prithviraj as Sabari
- Sahasra Shree as Thenmozhi "Thenu"
- Vishrutha
- Don Canin Rao
- Ramya Pandian as Jayanthi, Baththa's childhood crush (cameo appearance)
- J. Durai Raj as Thirunavukarasu's co-worker
- Rekha Kumanan as Kannima's friend

== Production ==
"I wanted to tell the story of a gangster (Baththa) without glorifying the violence or turning him into another larger-than-life hero. This is a grey or dark area and more than being about the gangster's power, I wanted to explore the anger, ego, insecurity and fear that often accompany such a life."

— Balaji Tharaneetharan on making Baththa

Baththa is the third collaboration between actor Vijay Sethupathi and director Balaji Tharaneetharan following Naduvula Konjam Pakkatha Kaanom (2012) and Seethakaathi (2018). During the COVID-19 lockdown period, where he spent his time with his children and eventually focused on writing the dialogues and screenplay for Tughlaq Durbar (2021) and the stories for two short films from the anthology television series Modern Love Chennai (2023), Balaji then developed the script for Baththa but stopped it halfway as he felt it "needed more layers" and worked on another script. However, after a period, the ideas for that film had flown easily and furthered his interest on writing Baththa knowing that the project would be greenlit easily.

Balaji took inspiration from incidents and people he witnessed during his formative years in the 1980s. He recalled an incident where he locked his class teacher at his school bathroom and that formed the genesis of Baththa. Balaji also cited Robert Bresson's French film A Man Escaped (1956) as one of the inspirations, regarding how a man being trapped in a room in isolation had scared him, while also remembering that incident as well. He also recalled that though the character was not written with Sethupathi in mind, he also considered that character to be apt for the film and Sethupathi, who listened to Balaji's narration, eventually liked the script.

Sethupathi, who was working in Jawan (2023) at that time, introduced Balaji to Atlee, hoping that the latter would position the film well under his production A for Apple Studios. Atlee further brought producers Murad Khetani, Alok Jain and Ajit Andhare under Cine1 Studios and Star Studio18, the former in their maiden South Indian project, while also setting up chief technicians into the project, such as musician Sai Abhyankkar, cinematographer Selvakumar S. K., editor R. Kalaivanan and production designer T. Muthuraj. Child actor Sai Prithviraj made his debut with this film, playing the role of Sabari. Balaji considered Sabari to be the childhood version of himself and his story helped in shaping up the character. Prithviraj recalled that his sister Kayal was the reason for him to venture into acting, as she acted in a minor role in Maargan (2025); he further added that he was trained by Kayal to prepare for the role. Lijomol Jose, Santhy Balachandran, Baby Sahasra Shree, Hari Krishnan, Vishnu Govindan, Arjun Chidambaram, Ajay Ghosh were also part of the cast.

Principal photography was complete even before the film was officially announced on 12 August 2026. Because the film is set in the 1980s in North Madras, the area was recreated for the film with the help of Muthuraj, and as per Balaji's suggestion, the team recreated some portions outside the locality such as Kaladipettai, instead of areas near the shore which Balaji refrained to do so.

== Music ==
The music was composed by Sai Abhyankkar with his maiden collaboration with both Vijay Sethupathi and Balaji Tharaneetharan.

== Release ==
=== Theatrical ===
Baththa was released in theatres worldwide on 1 October 2026, clashing with Yezhu Kadal Yezhu Malai, Sigma and Anbil Avan released in the same weekend. Owing to positive world of mouth, the film was increased to 700 theatres across Mumbai, Delhi, Lucknow and Noida, by 9 October.

=== Distribution ===
AGS Entertainment distributed the film in Tamil Nadu, and E4 Entertainment in Kerala. The overseas distribution rights were acquired by Panorama Studios and Zee Studios.

=== Home media ===
The film began streaming on Netflix from 29 October 2026.

== Reception ==
=== Critical response ===
Bhuvanesh Chandar of The Hindu wrote, "The first half of the film sails smoothly, thanks to the period setting and Vijay Sethupathi returning to a zone he long mastered through films like Idharkuthane Aasaipattai Balakumara and Kadhalum Kadandhu Pogum [...] Even when the momentum dips in the second half, something in Balaji's screenplay commands your attention or makes you chuckle". Manivasagan Namasivayam of DT Next wrote, "Baththa works because it doesn't make the transformation of its eponymous character overly complicated: it places a violent man in a simple survival situation and gives him time to confront his demons, managing to derive humour, emotion and warmth from this premise". M. Suganth of The Times of India wrote, "The tonal swings between drama and comedy can feel somewhat dissonant, but Baththa remains consistently fresh and moving throughout", comparing the title character's redemption favourably to that of Assault Sethu from Jigarthanda (2014).

Yashaswini Sri of The Indian Express wrote, "After a stretch of films where Sethupathi seemed to be coasting, choosing projects for commercial reasons rather than creative ones, Baththa feels like a return to the actor who made Naduvula Konjam Pakkatha Kaanom, Super Deluxe and Vikram Vedha. You laugh when he laughs, and you cry when he cries". Prashanth Vallavan of Cinema Express wrote, "Everything that makes Vijay Sethupathi unique as a performer is on glorious display in Baththa, like an art display with its own room and spotlight". Janani K of India Today called it a "moving comedy drama that's wholesome and beautiful. With minor shortcomings, the film brings laughter and emotion effortlessly".

=== Box office ===
In its 4 day opening weekend, Baththa grossed ₹11.68 crore worldwide. Despite a slow start, the film picked up. After 18 days of release the film's collections in Tamil Nadu were ₹27 crore, through which it reached break-even point, though trade analysts noted that it could have earned significantly more had the market conditions been more favourable during its release. As of 25 October, the film had collected ₹33.16 crore worldwide.

== Accolades ==
At the 12th India Film Festival of Alberta, Baththa won the award for Best Feature Film – 1, while Sai Prithviraj won for Best Actor – Special Mention.
