= Peruchazhi (soundtrack) =

Soundtrack album by Arrora
- Released: 30 July 2014
- Recorded: 2014
- Genre: Feature film soundtrack
- Length: 24:23
- Language: Malayalam
- Label: Think Music
- Producer: Arrora

Arrora chronology
| Kalyana Samayal Saadham (2013) | Peruchazhi (2014) | Oru Naal Iravil (2015) |

Peruchazhi is the soundtrack to the 2014 film of the same name directed by Arun Vaidyanathan and produced by Friday Film House starring Mohanlal, Sean James Sutton, Ragini Nandwani, Mukesh Madhavan, Baburaj, Aju Varghese and Vijay Babu. The film's original soundtrack composed by Arrora featured six original songs with lyrics written by Rajeev Govindan, R. Venugopal, and Blaaze. It was released by Think Music on 30 July 2014.

== Background ==
Arrora composed the film's musical score and soundtrack in his second feature film composition after Kalyana Samayal Saadham (2013) and also his maiden venture in Malayalam cinema. Vaidyanathan recommended Arrora to the producers Vijay Babu and Sandra Thomas after his association as a producer for Kalyana Samayal Saadham and eventually hired for the film. He composed around five tunes for the film during early 2014. The soundtrack consists of six tracks sung by Karthik, Arrora, Bombay Jayashri, Blaaze, Jyotsna Radhakrishnan, and Andrea Jeremiah. Rajeev Govindan, R. Venugopal, and Blaaze wrote the songs' lyrics.

"Po Mone Dinesha" was a song that came from Mohanlal's popular catchphrase "Ni Po Mone Dinesha" from Narasimham (2000). The song had two versions, one sung by Jyotsna Radhakrishnan, the other by Andrea Jeremiah. It was picturised with a dance sequence featuring Poonam Bajwa in belly dance attire. "Enthu Cheiyyan" is a romantic song sung by Bombay Jayashri and penned by R. Venugopal, the only melody on the soundtrack. "United States of Adipolica" and "Don't Mess With Me" are rap songs, both written and rendered by Blaaze.

== Release ==
A video of the first song "Adichu Polikkam", sung by Karthik and Arrora, was released on YouTube on 28 July 2014. The song showcases the principal characters getting ready to travel to the U. S. The soundtrack to the film was released by Think Music on 30 July, with the video song of "Po Mone Dinesha" was also unveiled on the same date.

== Track listing ==
| No. | Title | Lyrics | Singer(s) | Length |
|---|---|---|---|---|
| 1. | "Adichu Polikkam" | Rajeev Govindan | Karthik, Arrora | 4:16 |
| 2. | "Enthu Cheiyyan" | R. Venugopal | Bombay Jayashri | 4:37 |
| 3. | "United States of Adipolica (Theme Music)" | Blaaze | Blaaze | 3:05 |
| 4. | "Po Mone Dinesha (Version 1)" | Rajeev Nair | Jyotsna Radhakrishnan | 4:42 |
| 5. | "Don't Mess With Me (Peruchazhi Theme)" | Blaaze | Blaaze | 3:01 |
| 6. | "Po Mone Dinesha (Version 2)" | Rajeev Nair | Andrea Jeremiah | 4:42 |
| Total length: | | | | 24:23 |

== Reception ==
Writing for The Times of India, Akash Prakash opined that the soundtrack contains "trendy, danceable tracks". The highlight of "Adichu Polikkam" is "its singer, Karthik, and the track, which alternates between a soft anthem and a fast track, makes good use of his versatile voice." The review described "Enthi Cheiyyan" as a "soothing song...quite addictive ... [that] ends with a classical bit." It noted both versions of "Po Mone Dinesha" are "energetic and upbeat with a catchy beat all through but Andrea's version sounds more robust," and said "Don't Mess With Me" was "stylish and catchy". Karthik Srinivasan of Milliblog stated that "Arrora resurfaces in Malayalam with his form intact". Vipin Nair of Music Aloud described the soundtrack as "unabashedly massy though, and clearly for Lalettan fans" praising Arrora's "adeptness at arrangement".
