= Attention Please (film) =

- Directed by: Jithin Issac Thomas
- Written by: Jithin Issac Thomas
- Produced by: Kaarthekeyen Santhanam; Nithyan Martin; Karthik Subbaraj (presents)
- Starring: Vishnu Govindan
- Cinematography: Himal Mohan
- Edited by: Rohit VS Variyath
- Music by: Arun Vijay
- Production companies: Stone Bench Films; Mangoes And Coconuts
- Release dates: 12 February 2021 (IFFK); 26 August 2022 (India)
- Country: India
- Language: Malayalam

Attention Please is a 2021 Indian Malayalam-language thriller film written and directed by Jithin Issac Thomas in his feature film debut. The film stars Vishnu Govindan in his debut lead role. The film was screened at the 25th International Film Festival of Kerala and the 18th Chennai International Film Festival.

== Cast ==
- Vishnu Govindan as Hari
- Sreejith Babu as Jithin
- Anand Manmadhan as Ajith
- Jobin Paul
- Jicky Paul
- Athira Kallingal

== Production ==
Jithin Isaac Thomas previously directed the Pra. Thoo. Mu. segment in the anthology film Freedom Fight (2022).

== Reception ==
Saijth Shrijith of the Cinema Express rated the film 4/5 stars and wrote, "At the heart of Attention Please is a phenomenal performance from actor Vishnu Govindan, the soul of Jithin Issac Thomas' film". Sanjith Sidhardhan of OTTplay rated the film 3.5/5 stars and wrote, "Jithin Issac Thomas’ Attention Please is a gripping tale that is anchored by a terrific performance by Vishnu Govind[an] and some great writing".

== Home media ==
The film started streaming on Netflix on 16 September 2022.
