= Sai Abhyankkar =

Indian film composer

- Born: Sai Abhyankkar Ekambaresh; November 4, 2004 (age 22); Virugambakkam, Tamil Nadu, India
- Genres: Film score; Independent music
- Occupations: Composer; Playback singer; Instrumentalist; Music producer
- Instruments: Vocals; Keyboards; Tabla; Mridangam; Drums; Guitar
- Years active: 2022–present
- Labels: Think Music, Divo & Sun Music

Sai Abhyankkar is an Indian musician, composer and singer who works primarily in Tamil cinema. He gained recognition with his single "Katchi Sera". The song released as part of Think Music's independent music initiative, marked his debut as a solo artist. Abhyankkar's other singles include "Aasa Kooda", "Sithira Puthiri", "Vizhi Veekura", "Pavazha Malli", "Radhimaa", all composed for Think Indie Collective.

Abhyankkar made his film debut as an original music composer with the Malayalam-Tamil bilingual film Balti. He was first signed to compose music for the film Benz, which was intended to be his debut until production got delayed. He has since signed on many other projects including Dude, Karuppu, Baththa, OM and Raaka.

== Early life ==
Sai Abhyankkar was born in a Tamil family in Virugambakkam, Chennai to playback singers Tippu and Harini. He was introduced to music at a young age. His sister, Sai Smriti, is also a singer. A multi-instrumentalist, Abhyankkar learned to play the tabla, mridangam, piano, drums and guitar, and began composing music during his early teens. He trained in vocals under singers Sriram Parthasarathy, A.T. Ramamoorthy, and Henry Kuruvilla. Though he described himself as not very academically inclined, unlike his sister, he shifted to online schooling after completing 10th standard, allowing him more time to focus on music. According to Smriti, he began composing original music at the age of 13, and he has described his melodic arrangements as often leaning toward jazz and blues sensibilities.

== Career ==
=== 2022–2024: Debut and early success ===
Sai Abhyankkar made his playback singing debut in 2022 with the song "Valam Varavendum", which he wrote himself and was composed by Sriram Parthasarathy. During the COVID-19 pandemic in India, he developed a routine of composing musical grooves daily. One of these compositions stood out to both Abhyankkar and his friend Adesh Krishna, who later wrote the lyrics for it. In March 2023, Abhyankkar approached Think Indie with the track, which was immediately approved and later developed into "Katchi Sera".

Released on 21 January 2024, the music video featured Abhyankkar alongside Samyuktha Viswanathan and gained widespread popularity. As of 31 January 2026, the video has garnered over 250 million views on YouTube.

Following the success of his debut, Abhyankkar released his second independent single, "Aasa Kooda", on 12 June 2024. The track featured his sister, Sai Smriti, who sang alongside him. The music video included Preity Mukhundhan and received a highly positive response, significantly expanding his fanbase. As of 31 January 2026, the video had surpassed 350 million views on YouTube.

On the same day "Aasa Kooda" was released, Abhyankkar signed his first feature film, Benz, directed by Bakkiyaraj Kannan and presented by Lokesh Kanagaraj, starring Raghava Lawrence. His involvement was officially announced on his birthday, 4 November 2024. Later, on 9 December, it was announced that Abhyankkar had come in as a replacement for A. R. Rahman as the composer for RJ Balaji's directorial venture Karuppu (2026), starring Suriya, when Rahman decided to back out due to reasons unknown.

=== 2025–present ===
In February 2025, Abhyankkar entered discussions to compose for Atlee's Telugu debut, starring Allu Arjun and produced by Sun Pictures, titled Raaka. His involvement was confirmed in April.

On Puthandu (14 April 2025), Silambarasan confirmed that Abhyankkar would compose music for his 49th film, directed by Ramkumar Balakrishnan but the film was dropped afterwards and later became SK27 starring Sivakarthikeyan. He was also confirmed to compose for Pradeep Ranganathan's Dude (2025).

In July, Abhyankkar confirmed his involvement in his first film, the Malayalam film Balti (2025), starring Shane Nigam, and was announced as the composer for Karthi's Marshal on 10 July.

He was also announced as the composer for Sivakarthikeyan’s 27th film. Abhyankkar faced trolling on social media for signing numerous projects before his first film's release, to which he responded by crediting his success to "genuine networking" with experienced filmmakers.

"Sithira Puthiri", his third single, was released on 31 January 2025 and featured Meenakshi Chaudhary. Despite crossing 800,000 views within hours, it received a mixed response. On 5 July, at an Amazon Music event in Chennai, Abhyankkar announced his fourth single, "Vizhi Veekura", released on 7 July initially without a music video. He said the composition began with a simple piano motif, layering instruments such as the noori and mandolin. A music video was later released on 4 September 2025, featuring Saanve Megghana.

Abhyankkar's fifth single, "Pavazha Malli", which released on 4 March 2026, marking his first release of the year. While the music video premiered on 5 March 2026, the track was released early a day prior.

On 17 Aug 2026, Abhyankkar released the first look at his sixth indie, "Radhimaa", while his previous indie, "Pavazha Malli", was still charting #1 across various platforms. The song was released on 24 Aug 2026, with daily teasers and sneak peaks into the song and its making process.

== Discography ==
=== As composer ===
Key
| † | Denotes films that have not yet been released |

List of Sai Abhyankkar feature film credits as composer
| Year | Title | Director | Language | Notes | Ref. |
|---|---|---|---|---|---|
| 2025 | Balti | Unni Sivalingam | Malayalam | | |
| 2025 | Dude | Keerthiswaran | Tamil | | |
| 2026 | Karuppu | RJ Balaji | Tamil | | |
| 2026 | Baththa | Balaji Tharaneetharan | Tamil | | |
| 2026 | O.M: Operation Mole | Rajkumar Periasamy | Tamil | | |
| TBA | Benz † | Bakkiyaraj Kannan | Tamil | Filming | |
| TBA | Marshal † | Tamizh | Tamil | Filming | |
| TBA | Raaka † | Atlee | Telugu | Filming | |
| TBA | D56 † | Tamizharasan Pachamuthu | Tamil | Filming | |
| TBA | Suriya 48 † | T. J. Gnanavel | Tamil | Filming | |
| TBA | PRS01 † | The Alpha Unit | Tamil | Filming | |
| TBA | SK27 † | Ramkumar Balakrishnan | Tamil | Filming | |

=== As playback singer ===
Key
| † | Denotes films that have not yet been released |

==== Tamil ====
List of Tamil playback songs by Sai Abhyankkar
| Year | Film | Song | Composer | Co-singer(s) | Notes |
|---|---|---|---|---|---|
| 2025 | Madharaasi | "Salambala" | Anirudh Ravichander | – | Debut as playback singer; Tamil debut |
| 2025 | Dude | "Oorum Blood" | Himself | Deepthi Suresh, Bhumika, Paal Dabba | N/A |
| 2025 | Dude | "Oorum Blood (Unplugged)" | Himself | – | N/A |
| 2025 | Dude | "Nallaru Po" | Himself | Tippu, Mohit Chauhan | N/A |
| 2025 | Dude | "Kannukulla" | Himself | Jonita Gandhi | N/A |
| 2025 | Dude | "Kannukulla (Reprise)" | Himself | – | N/A |
| 2025 | Dude | "Singari" | Himself | Pradeep Ranganathan, Sai Smriti, The Indian Choral Ensemble | Not credited directly; Supporting vocals |
| 2025 | Dude | "Yumabaibesa" | Himself | – | N/A |
| 2026 | Karuppu | "God Mode" | Himself | Gana Muthu, The Indian Choral Ensemble | N/A |
| 2026 | Karuppu | "Naanga Naalu Peru" | Himself | Silambarasan TR, Asal Kolaar | Additional background vocals |
| 2026 | Karuppu | "Raathu Raasan" | Himself | V.M. Mahalingam, Paal Dabba | Additional background vocals |
| 2026 | Karuppu | "Karuppa Kooda Va" | Himself | V.M. Mahalingam | N/A |
| 2026 | Karuppu | "Verappa Extended" | Himself | Arivu, Theo | N/A |
| 2026 | Karuppu | "Athu Thalore (À Tout à L'Heure)" | Himself | Ananya Chakraborty, The Indian Choral Ensemble | Not credited directly; Additional background vocals |
| 2026 | Baththa | "Magale" | Himself | Harini | N/A |
| 2026 | Baththa | "Vaazhanum Baththa" | Himself | – | N/A |
| 2026 | Baththa | "Ooroda Oththa Don" | Himself | Vangal Pulla Vicky, Thamizh Aadhavan | N/A |
| 2026 | O.M: Operation Mole | "Alaakaa Loova" | Himself | – | N/A |
| 2026 | O.M: Operation Mole | "Veezha Veera" | Himself | Tippu | N/A |
| 2026 | O.M: Operation Mole | "Senjudare" | Himself | Harini | N/A |
| 2026 | O.M: Operation Mole | "FA FA FA" | Himself | Thamizh Aadhavan | N/A |

==== Telugu ====
List of Telugu playback songs by Sai Abhyankkar
| Year | Film | Song | Composer | Co-singer(s) | Notes |
|---|---|---|---|---|---|
| 2025 | Dude | "Boom Boom" | Himself | Deepthi Suresh, Bhumika | Telugu debut |
| 2025 | Dude | "Baagundu Po" | Himself | Sanjith Hegde | N/A |
| 2025 | Dude | "Singari" | Himself | Sai Smriti, The Indian Choral Ensemble | N/A |
| 2025 | Dude | "Nee Gunde Lona" | Himself | Jonita Gandhi, Arjun | N/A |
| 2026 | Veerabhadrudu | "Veerabhadrudu" | Himself | Ritesh G Rao, Vinayak, Ramajogayya Sastry | N/A |
| 2026 | Veerabhadrudu | "Saami Veta" | Himself | Vinayak, Bharath Raj Avula, Ritesh G Rao, Ramajogayya Sastry | N/A |
| 2026 | Veerabhadrudu | "God Mode" | Himself | Kaala Bairava, Kasarla Shyam | N/A |
| 2026 | Veerabhadrudu | "Verappa Extended" | Himself | Arun Kaundinya, Bharath Raj Avula, Yogi Sekar, Kasarla Shyam | N/A |

==== Malayalam ====
List of Malayalam playback songs by Sai Abhyankkar
| Year | Film | Song | Composer | Co-singer(s) | Notes |
|---|---|---|---|---|---|
| 2025 | Balti | "Jaalakaari" | Himself | Sublahshini | Malayalam debut |
| 2025 | Balti | "Padakkalame" | Himself | Pranavam Sasi, RANJ | N/A |
| 2025 | Balti | "Thattara Thattara" | Himself | Navakkarai Naveen Prabanjam | N/A |
| 2025 | Balti | "Vaada Veera" | Himself | Pranavam Sasi | N/A |
| 2025 | Balti | "Ammore Senniore" | Himself | Malayali Monkeys | N/A |

=== As keyboard programmer ===
| Year | Title | Music Director | Language | Ref. |
|---|---|---|---|---|
| 2023 | Pathu Thala | A. R. Rahman | Tamil | |
| 2023 | Japan | G. V. Prakash Kumar | Tamil | |
| 2024 | Indian 2 | Anirudh Ravichander | Tamil | |
| 2024 | Devara: Part 1 | Anirudh Ravichander | Telugu | |
| 2025 | Coolie | Anirudh Ravichander | Tamil | |

=== Singles ===
List of Sai Abhyankkar singles
| Year | Song | Notes | Director | Lyrics | Co-Singer | Co-Actress | Ref. |
|---|---|---|---|---|---|---|---|
| 2023 | "Valam Varavendum" | Composed by Sriram Parthasarathy | N/A | Himself | N/A | N/A | |
| 2024 | "Katchi Sera" | These are singles under the Think Music India label. | Ken Royson | Adesh Krishna | N/A | Samyuktha Viswanathan | |
| 2024 | "Aasa Kooda" | These are singles under the Think Music India label. | Thejo Bharathwaj | Sathyan Ilanko | Sai Smriti | Preity Mukhundhan | |
| 2025 | "Sithira Puthiri" | These are singles under the Think Music India label. | Akshay Sundher | Vivek | N/A | Meenakshi Chaudhary | |
| 2025 | "Vizhi Veekura" | These are singles under the Think Music India label. | Thejo Bharathwaj | Adesh Krishna | Sai Smriti | Saanve Megghana | |
| 2025 | "Vealodu Nindraan – Kural No. 552 | Composed by Lydian Nadhaswaram | N/A | The Thirukkural 1330 | N/A | N/A | |
| 2026 | "Pavazha Malli" | These are singles under the Think Music India label. | Thejo Bharathwaj | Vivek | Shruti Haasan | Kayadu Lohar | |
| 2026 | "Radhimaa" | These are singles under the Think Music India label. | Thejo Bharathwaj | Vivek | Nargis Teji, Asma Teji, Sai Smriti | Bhagyashri Borse | |
