= Paal Dabba =

Indian rapper

- Also known as: Paal Dabba
- Born: Anish; 17 January 2000 (age 26)
- Genres: Hip-hop, Pop
- Occupations: Musician, Songwriter, Dancer, Choreographer
- Label: Think Music India

Anish (born 17 January 2000), better known by his stage name Paal Dabba, is an Indian rapper, singer, songwriter and choreographer from Chennai, Tamil Nadu. He is best known for his singles "170CM", "Galatta" (from Aavesham), and "Kaathu Mela".

== Early life ==
Anish was born in Pulianthope, Tamil Nadu and later shifted to Vyasarpadi. He was a professional dancer before transitioning to the music industry. As a member of the Bfab dance crew, he participated in various reality shows and won national competitions like Breezer Vivid Shuffle 2019. Later, he ventured into rapping, adopting the stage name "Paal Dabba", inspired by his love for cold milk.

== Career ==
Anish (Paal Dabba) started his career professionally in 2022 with his single "3SHA" while he was a part of Bfab Dance Crew. The track gained recognition. In 2023, he performed the song "His Name Is John" from the unreleased movie Dhruva Natchathiram. The same year, he released "170CM" through Think Music Indie, which was featured in Apple's 'Work is worth it' campaign. The track received critical acclaim.

In 2024, he sang "Galatta", featuring Sushin Shyam and Vinayak Sasikumar, from the Malayalam film Aavesham. The track received over 30 million streams, charting in the Top 100 in India & UAE on Spotify Charts.

His release "Kaathu Mela" with OfRo came out in 2024 and went viral on Instagram. The track ranked in the Top 100 Spotify India Charts. The music video for the song was filmed on a police station set, highlighting the current state of law and order.

He performed the promo song "Makkamishi" from the 2024 Tamil film Brother. Anish was featured in Rolling Stone India's "Future Top 25 Artists 2024" and in Prime Music's "Future Artists of the Generation". He is now set to perform at the second edition of the hip-hop festival, Rolling Loud India.

== Discography ==
=== Singles ===
List of singles by Paal Dabba
Year	Song	Language	Composer	Ref.
2022	"3SHA"	Tamil	Saish Bharadwaj	
2022	"Ai"	Tamil	phenomenalprod	
2023	"170CM"	Tamil	Flameboi	
2023	"SAB"	Tamil	Himself	
2024	"Binge and Cringe"	Tamil	Darbuka Siva	
2024	"OCB"	Tamil	Shiv Paul	
2024	"Kaathu Mela"	Tamil	ofRo	
2024	"Torrie Wilson- Red Bull 64 Bars"	Tamil	Sez on the Beat	
2024	"D.A.T.N." with Brodha V	Tamil	Brodha V	
2025	"X"	Tamil	SHIV PAUL	
2025	"Vibe"	Tamil	Sickflip	
2025	"United by Hip Hop" with Reble, Vichaar and 99side	Hindi, Tamil, English	Adil	
2026	"Psilovibin"	Tamil	Foxn	
2026	"Adada" with Killa K	Tamil	Urban Thoza	

=== Film songs ===
List of film songs by Paal Dabba
Year	Film	Song	Language	Composer	Ref.
2023	Dhruva Natchathiram	"His Name is John"	Tamil	Harris Jayaraj	
2023	Let's Get Married	"Kaattu Payapulla"	Tamil	Ramesh Thamilmani	
2024	Aavesham	"Galatta"	Malayalam	Sushin Shyam	
2024	Brother	"Makkamishi"	Tamil	Harris Jayaraj	
2025	Good Bad Ugly	"God Bless U"	Tamil	G. V. Prakash Kumar	
2025	Thug Life	"O Maara"	Tamil	A. R. Rahman	
2025	3BHK	"Idi Mazhai"	Tamil	Amrit Ramnath	
2025	Dude	"Oorum Blood"	Tamil	Sai Abhyankkar	
2026	Karuppu	"Raathu Raasan"	Tamil	Sai Abhyankkar	

== Awards and nominations ==
Year	Award	Category	Work	Result
2024	Behindwoods Gold Mic Music Awards	Independent Rap Singer – Tamil	—	Won
