= DT Next =

Indian English Newspaper

- Type: Daily newspaper
- Format: Broadsheet
- Owner: Daily Thanthi Group
- Founded: 1 November 2015; 11 years ago
- Language: English
- Headquarters: Chennai, Tamil Nadu
- Country: India
- Sister newspapers: Dina Thanthi; Maalai Malar
- Website: www.dtnext.in

DT Next is an Indian English-language daily newspaper owned by Daily Thanthi Group, headquartered in Chennai, Tamil Nadu. It was launched on 1 November 2015 in Chennai, with Ninan Thariyan as CEO. On 30 June 2021, Thariyan resigned, and the following day, Yagna Balaji, the editor and co-founder of the newspaper, took over as CEO. As of October 2023, she is no longer associated with DT Next.

Content from DT Next has been cited by BBC News, News18, NDTV, and the Indian Express.
