= Think Music =

Indian record label

- Type: Private
- Industry: Music & entertainment
- Founded: 2007
- Founder: Swaroop Reddy
- Headquarters: Chennai, India
- Owner: SPI Music
- Parent: Believe Music

Think Music (also known as Think Music India) is an Indian music label headquartered in Chennai, Tamil Nadu that specialises in Indian film soundtracks.

== History ==
Think Music was established in 2007 by Elred Kumar and Jayaram, co-founders of RS Infotainment, as a digital first Tamil music label based in Chennai. The company focused on acquiring film audio rights during the Tamil film industry's rapid migration from physical to digital music distribution.

In 2011, The Economic Times reported that Sony Music Entertainment acquired 146 music titles from Think Music. The acquisition was described as part of Sony's strategy to expand its presence in the Tamil film music market. Some major titles, including the soundtrack of Endhiran (2010), were not part of the deal, reflecting Think Music's retention of selective rights. In 2021, Believe acquired a 76% stake in Think Music.

== Filmography ==
=== Tamil ===
- Lesa Lesa (2003)
- Aethiree (2004)
- Enthiran (2010)
- Uthamaputhiran (2010)
- 180 (2011)
- Deiva Thirumagal (2011)
- Raja Rani (2013)
- Cuckoo (2014)
- Indru Netru Naalai (2015)
- Papanasam (2015)
- 36 Vayadhinile (2015)
- Valiyavan (2015)
- 144 (2015)
- Thoongaavanam (2015)
- Server Sundaram (2016)
- Tharai Thapattai (2016)
- Aranmanai 2 (2016)
- Kabali (2016)
- Theri (2016)
- Maragadha Naanayam (2017)
- Vikram Vedha (2017)
- Meesaya Murukku (2017)
- Chennai 2 Singapore (2017)
- Sketch (2018)
- Oru Nalla Naal Paathu Solren (2018)
- 96 (2018)
- Imaikka Nodigal (2018)
- 60 Vayadu Maaniram (2018)
- Seemaraja (2018)
- Natpe Thunai (2019)
- Mr. Local (2019)
- Mookuthi Amman (2020)
- Maara (2021)
- Karnan (2021)
- Sivakumarin Sabadham (2021)
- Kathir (2022)
- D Block (2022)
- The Legend (2022)
- Naan Mirugamaai Maara (2022)
- Bommai (2023)
- Good Night (2023)
- Jigarthanda Double X (2023)
- Lover (2024)
- Maharaja (2024)
- Demonte Colony 2 (2024)
- Brother (2024)
- Bloody Beggar (2024)
- Dragon (2025)
- Veera Dheera Sooran (2025)
- Tourist Family (2025)
- 3BHK (2025)
- Thalaivan Thalaivii (2025)
- Ace (2025)
- Dude (2025)
- Vaa Vaathiyaar (2026)
- My Lord (2026)
- Karuppu (2026)
- Blast (2026)
- Idhayam Murali (2026)
- Once More (2026)
- Baththa (2026)

=== Malayalam ===
- Neram (2013)
- Ohm Shanti Oshaana (2014)
- Samsaaram Aarogyathinu Haanikaram (2014)
- Peruchazhi (2014)
- Nagara Varidhi Naduvil Njan (2014)
- Mili (2015)
- Hridayam (2022)
- Sreedhanya Catering Service (2022)
- Mei Hoom Moosa (2022)
- 1744 White Alto (2022)
- Ini Utharam (2022)
- Naalaam Mura (2022)
- Wonder Women (2022)
- Saudi Vellakka (2022)
- Vaashi (2022)
- Christy (2023)
- Pranaya Vilasam (2023)
- Purusha Pretham (2023)
- Kadina Kadoramee Andakadaham (2023)
- 2018 (2023)
- Sulaikha Manzil (2023)
- Jackson Bazaar Youth (2023)
- Thrishanku (2023)
- Journey of Love 18+ (2023)
- Chitta (Malayalam) (2023)
- Chaaver (2023)
- Tholvi F.C. (2023)
- Sesham Mike-il Fathima (2023)
- Falimy (2023)
- Manjummel Boys (2024)
- Jananam 1947 Pranayam Thudarunnu (2024)
- Kadakan (2024)
- Anchakkallakokkan (2024)
- Aavesham (2024)
- Varshangalkku Shesham (2024)
- Nadikar (2024)
- Thalavan (2024)
- Paradise (2024
- Gaganachari (2024)
- Kanakarajyam (2024)
- Vishesham (2024)
- Idiyan Chandhu (2024)
- Level Cross (2024)
- Vaazha: Biopic of a Billion Boys (2024)
- Cup (2024)
- Ajayante Randam Moshanam (2024)
- Thekku Vadakku (2024)
- I Am Kathalan (2024)
- Mura (2024)
- Anand Sreebala (2024)
- Turkish Tharkkam (2024)
- Communist Pacha Adhava Appa (2024)
- Sookshmadarshini (2024)
- Rifle Club (2024)
- Rekhachithram (2025)
- Ponman (2025)
- Painkili (2025)
- Daveed (2025)
- Get-Set Baby (2025)
- Idi Mazha Kattu (2025)
- Alappuzha Gymkhana (2025)
- Maranamass (2025)
- Balti (2025)
- Thalavara (2025)
- Sarkeet (2025)
- Aabhyanthara Kuttavaali (2025)
- Mahavatar Narsimha (Malayalam)
- Dheeran (2025)
- Haal (2025)
- Sangarsha Ghadana [The Art Of Warfare] (2025)
- The Pet Detective (2025)
- Vala: Story of a Bangle (2025)
- Ithiri Neram (2025)
- Immortal (Malayalam) (2026)
- Prakambanam (2026)
- Chinna Chinna Aasai (2026)
- Vaazha II: Biopic of a Billion Bros (2026)
- Mohiniyaattam (2026)
- Peter (Malayalam) (2026)

=== Telugu ===
- A1 Express (2021)
- Maa Inti Bangaaram (2026)

=== Hindi ===
- Mahavatar Narsimha (2025)
