= Karuppu (film) =

2026 Indian film by RJ Balaji

- Theatrical release poster
- Directed by: RJ Balaji
- Written by: Ashwin Ravichandran; Rahul Raj; Karan Aravind Kumar; T. S. Gopi Krishnan
- Dialogues by: RJ Balaji; Ashwin Ravichandran
- Produced by: S. R. Prabhu; S. R. Prakash Babu
- Starring: Suriya; RJ Balaji; Trisha
- Cinematography: G. K. Vishnu
- Edited by: R. Kalaivanan
- Music by: Sai Abhyankkar
- Production company: Dream Warrior Pictures
- Distributed by: see below
- Release date: 15 May 2026
- Running time: 152 minutes
- Country: India
- Language: Tamil
- Budget: est. ₹130–140 crore
- Box office: est. ₹296.44–363 crore (Note: Karuppu's reported worldwide grosses vary between ₹296.44 crore (Box Office India) – ₹310 crore (The Telegraph, Hindustan Times) – ₹315 crore (Moneycontrol) – ₹363 crore (Forbes India).)

Karuppu (transl. Black) (Note: Also a reference to Karuppannaswamy.) is a 2026 Indian Tamil-language fantasy action drama film directed by RJ Balaji from a screenplay he co-wrote with Ashwin Ravichandran, Rahul Raj, T. S. Gopi Krishnan and Karan Aravind Kumar. Produced by Dream Warrior Pictures, the film stars Suriya, Balaji and Trisha, alongside Indrans, Anagha Maya Ravi (in her Tamil debut), Sshivada, Swasika, Natty Subramaniam and Supreeth Reddy. In the film, the guardian deity Vettai Karuppu disguises himself as a lawyer to fight corruption in a court system.

The film was officially announced in October 2024 under the tentative title Suriya 45, as it is the actor's 45th film in a leading role. Principal photography commenced the following month in Pollachi and was completed by early 2026. The official title was announced in June 2025. The film has music composed by Sai Abhyankkar, cinematography handled by G. K. Vishnu and editing by R. Kalaivanan.

Karuppu was originally scheduled for release in India on 14 May 2026, but the release was cancelled at the last minute due to unforeseen circumstances; following the resolution of the issue, the film was released on 15 May 2026 and received mixed to positive reviews from critics. The film was a massive commercial success, grossing ₹296.44–363 crore worldwide and became the highest-grossing film in Suriya's career and also the third highest-grossing Tamil film of 2026.

== Plot ==
Binu and her father Mattancherry Sukumaran are traveling from Kerala to Chennai by train for Binu's liver transplant treatment, carrying 60 sovereigns of gold meant to fund the surgery. During a halt at an intermediate station, a group of thieves steal their bag. The duo file a complaint at a nearby police station, where the police later claim to have recovered only 45 sovereigns of the stolen gold. They are informed that the jewels can only be returned through a Return of Property petition filed in court.

Desperate to recover the gold, Binu and Sukumaran approach Baby Kannan, a powerful advocate who controls the local court through corruption and influence. Instead of helping them, Baby Kannan deliberately drags the case for money, exploiting the family until they slowly lose hope of getting the jewels back. Unable to bear the injustice any longer, Sukumaran prays to and seeks help from Vettai Karuppu, the guardian deity of the Seven Wells, also known as Ellaswamy. Karuppu decides to punish Baby Kannan and enters the court disguised as a newly transferred advocate named Saravanan to fight Binu's case legally.

Saravanan soon learns how deeply corrupted the court system is. He also meets Advocate Preethi, who explains Baby Kannan's influence over the entire court. During the first hearing, Baby Kannan manipulates the proceedings by creating confusion through multiple petitions filed under different advocates, causing the hearing to become invalid. Saravanan secretly uses his supernatural powers to counter the corruption, which is witnessed by both Preethi and Baby Kannan. Baby Kannan then challenges Saravanan to win the case without using any of his powers. Despite several obstacles, Saravanan eventually succeeds in retrieving the jewels. However, the victory comes too late, as Binu dies before she can undergo the transplant. Saravanan then decides that nobody else seeking justice at the court shall be delayed or denied.

Saravanan takes up a sexual assault case involving a woman. Realising that powerful men connected to Baby Kannan are behind the crime, Saravanan entrusts the case to Preethi. Earlier, Preethi had wished for a modern court where nobody could lie and where old unresolved cases would finally receive justice. During the first hearing of the assault case, Baby Kannan unexpectedly finds himself unable to lie in court and is forced to reveal the truth. His confession angers a minister connected to the crime, who decides to eliminate him. Baby Kannan slowly realises that these changes are part of Karuppu's divine intervention. Karuppu also begins eliminating crime within the boundaries of the Seven Wells, leading to old cases being resolved and preventing new crimes from taking place. Baby Kannan notices that even the minister's men are unable to commit crimes within the area protected by Karuppu, whose powers are limited only to the Seven Wells.

Determined to escape Karuppu's influence, Baby Kannan plans to relocate the court outside the protected area. He murders the judge who opposes the move, then engineers chaos inside the court complex, causing the building to collapse. Using the incident to his advantage, he successfully pushes for the relocation of the court temporarily in another locality, in Sriperumbudur IT park. However, Baby Kannan's license to practice law gets suspended when he attempts to bribe the new judge, and he continues to be haunted by Karuppu's presence and warnings. During the inauguration ceremony of the new court, Baby Kannan arrives with armed men to threaten everyone present. They are stopped by the Deputy superintendent of police Durai Singam, who is revealed to be Kaaval Karuppu, the guardian deity of the new area. The deity ultimately executes Baby Kannan, ending his reign of corruption. Later, Preethi visualises Binu and her father eating biryani together peacefully as Binu wished.

In a mid-credits scene, the opposition party in the Tamil Nadu Legislative Assembly criticises Chief Minister Usilampatti Karuppiah Gandhi (UKG) for failing to address the demands of the judiciary. During the vote of trust, UKG proves he has the support of the majority. He is opposed only by Karuppu, who is now seen in the opposition party as an MLA.

== Cast ==
- Suriya as Karuppuswamy / Saravanan
- RJ Balaji as Baby Kannan
- Trisha as Preethi (voice dubbed by Chinmayi)
- Indrans as Mattancherry Sukumaran
- Natty Subramaniam as Chief Metropolitan Magistrate Rajanayagam
- Poobalam Pragatheeswaran as Shanmugam
- Supreeth Reddy as Gouri
- Anagha Maya Ravi as Binu Sukumaran
- Swasika as Vasanthi
- Sshivada as Kanmani
- Mansoor Ali Khan as Stone
- George Maryan as Court Clerk
- Aadukalam Naren as Chief Metropolitan Magistrate Sundarapandiyan
- Kitty as Court Witness
- Vela Ramamoorthy as V. M. Pandian, Ex Law Minister
- Kodangi Vadivelu as Ganesh
- Deepa Shankar as Selvi
- Lollu Sabha Maaran as S. Kumaran
- Namo Narayana as Thaniga
- Munnar Ramesh as Damodaran
- Vettai Muthukumar as Law Minister, Tamil Nadu Legislative Assembly member
- Ramachandran Durairaj as priest
- Mathew Varghese as the man trying to help Kanmani get an advocate
- Karate Karthi as Cold, Stone's brother
- Jaffer Sadiq as Austin, Stone's and Cold's brother
- Sandy as a cold-blooded criminal asking for chocolate coffee
- Janany Kunaseelan as a staff member at the coffee shop
- Unnimaya Prasad as Inspector V. Thangameena
- Gousalya as Court Witness
- Mai Pa Narayanan as lawyer
- Osthi Ram as Baby Kannan's supporter
- KPY Kothandam as a court worker
- Kalki Raja as Satti
- Crane Manohar as Court Clerk
- Supergood Subramani as Police officer

Uncredited

- Aju Varghese as the doctor from Kerala
- Chithra Lakshmanan as Tamil Nadu Legislative Assembly speaker
- Giant Zanjeer as himself in the song "Naanga Naalu Peru"
- Aroul D. Shankar as Tamil Nadu Legislative Assembly member
- Raja Rani Pandian as Tamil Nadu Legislative Assembly member

Balaji, besides portraying Baby Kannan, appears briefly as Usilampatti Karuppaiah Gandhi (UKG), paying homage to his role as the title character from the 2019 film LKG. Suriya, besides playing the title character, appears as Durai Singam (from the Singam film series) towards the climax.

== Production ==
=== Development ===
In September 2024, it was reported that Suriya would collaborate with RJ Balaji for the former's third directorial venture. Balaji had written a script which was initially narrated to Vijay for his 69th film, but did not progress. (Note: The project then went to H. Vinoth and became Jana Nayagan.) He subsequently met Suriya before the release of Kanguva (2024) and narrated the same script, which impressed the actor, who agreed to take on the role. The film was intended to commence after Suriya had completed shooting for Retro (2025). The project was reportedly produced by S. R. Prabhu and S. R. Prakash Babu's Dream Warrior Pictures, marking the actor's second collaboration with the production house after NGK (2019).

The company made a public announcement on 14 October 2024, confirming the project, tentatively titled Suriya 45, as it was the actor's 45th film in a lead role. The announcement poster, released on the same day, featured a collection of lengthy sickles and spears with a horse galloping between them, leading to speculation that the film would be a Hindu mythological or fantasy drama. Ashwin Ravichandran, Rahul Raj, T. S. Gopi Krishnan and Karan Aravind Kumar co-wrote the script with Balaji. In late November, G. K. Vishnu was confirmed as the cinematographer, returning to Tamil cinema after six years since Bigil (2019). The following month, editor R. Kalaivanan, production designer Arun Venjaramoodu and action choreographer Vikram Mor were announced as part of the technical crew. The film's official title, Karuppu, was announced on 20 June 2025, coinciding with Balaji's birthday.

=== Casting ===
In November 2024, it was reported that Trisha had been cast as the lead actress, pairing with Suriya for the fourth time after 21years. Previous movies are Mounam Pesiyadhe (2002), Aayutha Ezhuthu (2004) and Aaru (2005). Her participation was officially confirmed on 14 December 2024. Trisha's voice was dubbed by Chinmayi. On 15 December 2024, the producers confirmed the casting of Indrans and Swasika, although the latter had earlier hinted at her involvement through social media. Subsequently Alappuzha Gymkhana and Kaathal: The Core fame Anagha Maya Ravi, Sshivada, Natty Subramaniam and Supreeth Reddy were announced as part of the cast in the same month. The film marked Anagha's Tamil debut. Aju Varghese appeared in a cameo role without remuneration. Indrans, a native Malayalam speaker, was initially apprehensive about acting in the film due to his limited grasp of Tamil but was encouraged by Balaji who revealed that the character was a Malayali. Sandy Master and Janany Kunaseelan appear in cameo roles, reprising their roles from Leo (2023). Sandy had grown a beard for another film, which became a problem for his Karuppu cameo which required he recreate his Leo looks, so he had to attain permission from the producers of his other film to remove his beard for Karuppu. Arya filmed a cameo, but his scenes did not make the final cut.

=== Filming ===
Principal photography began with an inaugural puja ceremony on 27 November 2024 at Masani Amman temple in Pollachi with the presence of the film's cast and crew. The first schedule commenced the following day in Coimbatore. In early December, pictures from the sets leaked online which featured Trisha and Suriya dressed as lawyers, leading to speculation about their characters. By mid-February 2025, the team planned to shoot key sequences at the East Coast Road (ECR) in Chennai. During filming at Velichal in the Kelambakkam–Vandalur stretch, makeshift platforms erected by the art direction team caused unexpected roadblocks, prompting local residents to alert authorities. Police subsequently intervened and halted filming, citing the production team's failure to obtain the necessary permissions. Officials advised the makers to secure prior approval from the Tambaram Metropolitan Police Commissioner's office, resulting in the cancellation of the planned schedule.

In early March 2025, the production moved to Hyderabad to film a crucial sequence at Ramoji Film City. Later that month, the team shot a festive song sequence featuring over 500 dancers alongside the lead actors. Production designer Arun Venjaramoodu constructed a massive set at Adityaram Studios in ECR for the sequence, which was choreographed by Shobi. In early May 2025, reports stated that filming was expected to wrap later that month. However, by August 2025, production had yet to be completed. In late October 2025, Balaji revealed that approximately three-fourths of the film had been completed. In early 2026, it was officially confirmed that filming had been completed; however, six months later, parts of the Kaaval Karuppu portions in the climax had to be reshot despite the film having been locked as Balaji was no longer satisfied; though Suriya was already filming for Vishwanath & Sons in Hyderabad, he came to Chennai and completed the reshoots in two days.

== Music ==
The soundtrack was initially announced to be composed by A. R. Rahman in what would have been his fourth collaboration with Suriya in the lead role after Aayutha Ezhuthu (2004), Sillunu Oru Kaadhal (2006), and 24 (2016). However, Rahman opted out for undisclosed reasons, and on 9 December 2024, Sai Abhyankkar was announced as the replacement composer.

The first single, "God Mode", was released on 20 October 2025 during Diwali. The second single, "Naanga Naalu Peru", was released on 23 March 2026. The third single, "Raathu Raasan", was released on 14 April 2026 on the occasion of Tamil New Year. The song featured vocals by Sai Abhyankkar and V. M. Mahalingam in their first collaboration, while also reuniting Abhyankkar with rapper Paal Dabba after "Oorum Blood" from Dude (2025). The lyrics were written by Vivek. On 13 May 2026, the extended version track "Verappa Extended" was released digitally on Spotify. The audio launch event was held on 26 April 2026 at Solamalai College of Engineering in Madurai. The entire album was released on 25 May 2026.

== Marketing ==
The first teaser was released on 23 July 2025, coinciding with Suriya's birthday. The teaser revealed his character's name as Saravanan, a reference to the actor's real name, confirmed speculation that he would portray a lawyer, and featured references to Suriya's earlier films such as Ghajini (2005); the scene paying homage to Ghajini featured only in the teaser. In 10 May 2026, during the IPL match between Chennai Super Kings and Lucknow Super Giants, the makers of Karuppu attended the event to promote the film and unveil the official trailer. Prior to the trailer launch, Balaji stated that the promotional campaign had been delayed due to multiple factors, including the 2026 Tamil Nadu Legislative Assembly election.

== Release ==
=== Theatrical ===
Karuppu was initially scheduled for a release during the occasion of Diwali in 2025, but was postponed due to unfinished post-production works. In February 2026, Balaji said the film would release only after the elections. In March, the makers announced that the film would be released worldwide on 14 May 2026. The film's Telugu dubbed version is titled Veerabhadrudu.

On the eve of release, S. R. Prabhu stated that the film's early morning shows, which were slated for 9 AM on the day of release, were cancelled. DT Next reported that this was caused by unsettled debts, including location charges at EVP Studios, Chennai. On the morning of the initial scheduled release day, the morning, noon and matinee shows across several theatres were cancelled, with reports alleging that financial troubles faced by the production banner had delayed the release. Though Balaji expressed hope that the film would be released on the evening of 14 May, it was confirmed later in the day that the film would not arrive on its originally scheduled date. The same day, the film began illegally screening in certain theatres in North India and clips from those screenings were leaked online; subsequently the producers sent a notice to Qube Cinema Technologies for unlawfully activating Key Delivery Messages. The film was eventually released worldwide on 15 May 2026.

=== Distribution ===
Sakthi Film Factory acquired the Tamil Nadu theatrical distribution rights for Karuppu. The film's other distributors include I.M.P Films (Kerala), Annapurna Studios (Andhra Pradesh and Telangana), KVN Productions (Karnataka), Pen Marudhar (North India), and Phars Films for overseas distribution.

=== Home media ===
The post-theatrical streaming rights of Karuppu were acquired by Amazon Prime Video, while the satellite rights were acquired by Zee Tamil. The film began streaming on Amazon Prime Video from 12 June 2026 in Tamil and dubbed versions of Telugu, Malayalam, Kannada and Hindi languages.

== Reception ==
=== Box office ===
On its opening day, Karuppu grossed approximately ₹11.25 crore in Tamil Nadu. Karuppu set the second-highest opening weekend box office record of Suriya's career, and is also the highest opening weekend box office record for a Tamil-language film so far in 2026. The film grossed nearly ₹15.50 crore net on its opening day in India, with a total domestic box office of approximately ₹18 crore. Its global opening day gross was approximately ₹29 crore. News18 believes that the film's delay seemed to have actually increased audience curiosity.

Karuppu surpassed ₹100 crore at the global box office within days of its release, and outperformed Singam II (2013) to become the highest-grossing film of Suriya. One week after its release, the makers announced that the film had grossed over ₹100 crore in Tamil Nadu alone. At this point, the film's global box office had reached ₹200 crore. By 29 May 2026, the film's total box office in India had reached ₹194 crore, with a net domestic box office of ₹168 crore. By the end of four weeks, the film grossed ₹223 crore from the domestic markets (including ₹175 crore in Tamil Nadu) and ₹304 crore worldwide. (Note: Attributed to multiple sources, including Filmfare, India Today, Cinema Express, and The Week.) Result, the film grossed ₹296.44–363 crore worldwide in its lifetime.

=== Critical response ===
Karuppu received mixed to positive reviews from critics.

Rohit Panikker of Filmfare gave 3/5 stars and wrote, "Suriya anchors RJ Balaji's ambitious blend of folklore, courtroom drama and social commentary, though uneven pacing and tonal shifts blunt its impact." He further concluded, "Karuppu may not achieve perfect balance between mythology, message and mass entertainment, but it remains an ambitious and often compelling film whose strengths outweigh its shortcomings." Yashaswini Sri from The Indian Express rated 3/5 stars and wrote "A deity walks into a courtroom, that is the premise of Karuppu, and on paper it should not work as well as it does. RJ Balaji wrings the best out of Suriya Sivakumar and delivers a film full of moments the fans will talk about for a while. But as the whistles fade, what is left is a plot that loses its way. One of Suriya's strongest performances in years is delivered in a film that is only half as good as he is."

M Suganth from The Times of India rated 2.5/5 stars and wrote "As long as it sticks to “just court things”, Karuppu works. But once it goes all out “just God things”, the film swaps human emotion for divine spectacle — and emerges less powerful for it." Kaushik Rajaraman of DT Next gave the film 2.5 out of 5 stars, noting that Suriya's performance and Sai Abhyankkar's music salvaged the otherwise mediocre movie. Bhawana Tanmayi of Moneycontrol gave 2.5/5 stars and wrote, "While the audience is fast moving towards sharper and more layered story-telling in this era, Karuppu follows a familiar commercial template that might be more attractive to mass-centre audiences. The movie is more of RJ Balaji style of filmmaking than a full-blown Suriya movie and ultimately leaves viewers hoping that the star could have been used better." However, he believes that Suriya's performance was still outstanding, and the film is reasonably worth watching.

Bhuvanesh Chandar from The Hindu wrote "Sure, the scenes that show Suriya in 'God mode' are fun to watch, but the emotional scaffolding begins to wither away, especially after the terrific intermission block. As a major hiccup, the film doesn't clearly establish and maintain the rules of its supernatural entity, resorting to them as and when the plot progresses." Nikhil Waiker of Deccan Herald gave 1/5 stars and wrote, "In short, a disappointing and predictable watch. It seems like Karuppu is a sharp reflection of a film industry that “manufactures” films instead of making them with artistic zeal."

== Controversies ==
Post-release, an advocate from Kodambakkam filed a petition in the Madras High Court to ban the film, feeling it depicted the Indian judicial system in poor light; however, the court rejected his petition, citing freedom of expression, and the fact that there have been cases of Indian lawyers and judges being involved in corruption. A dialogue referencing musician Ilaiyaraaja's frequent battles against unauthorised reuse and remixing of his compositions was criticised as slanderous; post-release it was deleted, with the producers saying they had no intention to ridicule him and that it was "part of a broader satirical context". The visual effects near the climax were criticised, especially the scenes involving Durai Singam. This issue became even more apparent after the streaming release. Balaji accepted the criticism, noting that compromises were made due to financial and time constraints.
