= List of productions by The Viral Fever =

The Viral Fever (TVF) is an Indian digital entertainment company founded in 2010 by Arunabh Kumar. The company produces web series, television shows, and feature films in Hindi and other Indian languages.

This page lists productions created and/or produced by TVF.

== Television and web series ==
Note: Initially, most of the shows and series produced by The Viral Fever premiered on YouTube and TVFPlay. Over time, many of these titles were acquired or licensed by major streaming platforms. Therefore, only the current streaming platforms are mentioned in this list.

Title	Year	Language	Platform	Notes	Ref
Permanent Roommates	2014–present	Hindi	Amazon Prime Video	One of India's first successful web series	
TVF Pitchers	2015–present	Hindi	ZEE5	Startup-based drama series	
TVF Tripling	2016–2022	Hindi	ZEE5	Road comedy-drama series	
Humorously Yours	2016–present	Hindi	ZEE5	Stand-up comedy drama	
The Aam Aadmi Family	2016–present	Hindi	ZEE5		
TVF Bachelors	2016–present	Hindi	MX Player		
InMates	2017	Hindi	ZEE5	5 episode miniseries	
Flames	2018–2023	Hindi	Amazon Prime Video		
College Romance	2018–present	Hindi	SonyLIV	Youth romantic comedy	
Yeh Meri Family	2018–present	Hindi	Amazon Prime Video, Amazon miniTV		
Kota Factory	2019–2024	Hindi	Netflix	Black-and-white series set in Kota coaching centres	
Gullak	2019–present	Hindi	SonyLIV	Family comedy-drama	
Cubicles	2019–present	Hindi	SonyLIV	Corporate-techie's career based drama	
Hostel Daze	2019–present	Hindi	Amazon Prime Video		
Panchayat	2020–present	Hindi	Amazon Prime Video	Rural comedy-drama series	
Aspirants	2021–present	Hindi	Amazon Prime Video	UPSC aspirants drama	
Saas Bahu Achaar Pvt. Ltd.	2022–present	Hindi	Zee5		
SK Sir Ki Class	2023	Hindi	YouTube	Aspirants spin-off	
Sandeep Bhaiya	2023	Hindi	YouTube	Aspirants spin-off	
Engga Hostel	2023	Tamil	Amazon Prime Video	Hostel Daze remake	
Hostel Days	2023	Telugu	Amazon Prime Video	Hostel Daze remake	
Half CA	2023–2025	Hindi	Amazon miniTV		
Thalaivettiyaan Paalayam	2024	Tamil	Amazon Prime Video	Panchayat remake	
Very Parivarik	2024–present	Hindi	YouTube		
Guri Dhairya Ki Love Story	2025	Hindi	YouTube	Aspirants spin-off	
Gram Chikitsalay	2025	Hindi	Amazon Prime Video		
Court Kacheri	2025	Hindi	SonyLIV		
Sivarapalli	2025	Telugu	Amazon Prime Video	Panchayat remake	
Space Gen: Chandrayaan	2026	Hindi	JioHotstar		
Family Kirana Store	2026	Hindi	YouTube		
Hello Bachhon	2026	Hindi	Netflix	Education-driven drama inspired by Physics Wallah	

== Feature films ==
Title	Year	Notes
Vvan – Force of the Forrest	2026	Directed by Deepak Mishra and Arunabh Kumar, featuring Sidharth Malhotra and Tamannaah Bhatia in lead roles. Co-produced Balaji Motion Pictures.

== See also ==
- The Viral Fever
