= List of awards and nominations received by Sidharth Malhotra =

Sidharth Malhotra awards and nominations
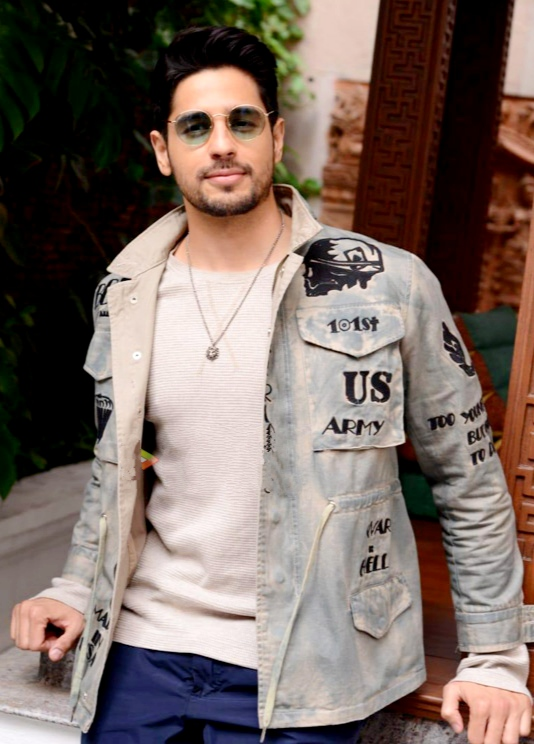
- Malhotra in 2019
Awards and nominations
Award	Wins	Nominations
BIG Star Entertainment Awards	2	3
Filmfare Awards	0	2
Screen Awards	0	2
Zee Cine Awards	0	2
Stardust Awards	1	2
Star Guild Awards	0	1
IIFA Awards	0	1
Nickelodeon Kids' Choice Awards India	1	1
HELLO! Hall of Fame Awards	6	0
Iconic Gold Awards	1	0
Others	23	29

Totals (Note: Certain award groups do not simply award one winner. They acknowledge several different recipients, have runners-up, and have third place. Since this is a specific recognition and is different from losing an award, runner-up mentions are considered wins in this award tally. For simplification and to avoid errors, each award in this list has been presumed to have had a prior nomination.)
- Wins: 34
- Nominations: 43

Sidharth Malhotra is an Indian actor who appears in Hindi films. He has been featured in Forbes India's Celebrity 100 list in 2016 and 2018 and has been listed in the Times of India's list since 2013. Malhotra has received numerous accolades for his work, including the Stardust Award for Breakthrough Performance — Male for Student of the Year and the BIG Star Entertainment Awards for Most Entertaining Actor in a Romantic Film — Male for his performance in the 2014 romantic comedy Hasee Toh Phasee.

He has received nominations at the Filmfare Awards, Screen Awards, International Indian Film Academy Awards, Zee Cine Awards, Star Guild Awards, and Times of India Film Awards. He won the Powerhouse Performer of the Year at the Nickelodeon Kids' Choice Awards India for his performance in the biographical war film Shershaah. He has also received multiple honours at the Hello! Hall of Fame Awards, including Popular Choice Actor of the Year for Param Sundari in 2026.

== Awards and nominations ==
Award	Year	Film	Category	Result	Ref.
BIG Star Entertainment Awards	2013	Student of the Year	Most Entertaining Actor (Film) Debut — Male	Nominated	
BIG Star Entertainment Awards	2014	Hasee Toh Phasee	Most Entertaining Actor in a Romantic Film — Male	Won	
BIG Star Entertainment Awards	2014	—N/a	Star Plus Entertainer of the Year (Note: Shared with Alia Bhatt)	Won	
BIG Star Entertainment Awards	2015	Ek Villain	Most Entertaining Actor in a Thriller Film — Male	Nominated	
BIG Star Entertainment Awards	2017	Kapoor & Sons	Most Entertaining Actor in a Romantic Film — Male	Nominated	
Bollywood Hungama OTT India Fest	2023	Mission Majnu	Best Actor Male Popular – Original Film	Nominated	
ETC Bollywood Business Awards	2013	Student of the Year	Most Profitable Debut — Male	Nominated	
Filmfare Awards	2013	Student of the Year	Best Male Debut	Nominated	
Filmfare Awards	2022	Shershaah	Best Actor	Nominated	
Hello! Hall of Fame Awards	2022	Shershaah	Outstanding Talent of the Year	Won	
Hello! Hall of Fame Awards	2023	Mission Majnu	Best Actor (Popular Choice)	Won	
Hello! Hall of Fame Awards	2016	—N/a	Rising Star of the Year	Won	
Hello! Hall of Fame Awards	2026	Param Sundari	Popular Choice Actor of the Year	Won	
Iconic Gold Awards	2022	Shershaah	Best Actor of the Year	Won	
International Indian Film Academy Awards	2022	Shershaah	Best Actor	Nominated	
NBT Utsav Awards	2022	Shershaah	NBT Maha Utsav Best Actor Award	Won	
Nickelodeon Kids' Choice Awards	2022	Shershaah	Powerhouse Performer of the Year	Won	
Nickelodeon Kids' Choice Awards	2022	Shershaah	Favorite Actor — Movie	Nominated	
News18 Showsha Reel Awards	2023	Shershaah	Best Actor	Won	
Screen Awards	2013	Student of the Year	Most Promising Newcomer — Male	Nominated	
Screen Awards	2015	Ek Villain	Best Actor — Popular Choice	Nominated	
Stardust Awards	2013	Student of the Year	Breakthrough Performance — Male (Note: Shared with Varun Dhawan)	Won	
Stardust Awards	2013	Student of the Year	Superstar of Tomorrow — Male	Nominated	
Stardust Awards	2015	Ek Villain	Superstar of Tomorrow — Male	Nominated	
Star Guild Awards	2013	Student of the Year	Best Male Debut	Nominated	
Times of India Film Awards	2013	Student of the Year	Best Debut — Male	Nominated	
Zee Cine Awards	2013	Student of the Year	Best Male Debut	Nominated	
Zee Cine Awards	2018	Ittefaq	Best Actor in a Negative Role	Nominated	

== Other awards ==
Year	Award	Category	Result	Ref.
2014	Hello! Hall of Fame Awards	Most Stylish Man of the Year	Won	
2014	Filmfare Glamour and Style Awards	Emerging Face of Fashion (Male)	Won	
2016	Filmfare Glamour and Style Awards	Most Stylish Star (Male)	Won	
2016	Vogue Beauty Awards	Most Beautiful Man	Won	
2017	GQ Men of the Year Awards	Most Stylish Man of the Year	Won	
2018	Hello! Hall of Fame Awards	Most Stylish Man of the Year	Won	
2021	Lokmat Stylish Awards	Most Stylish Actor of the Year	Won	
2022	Pinkvilla Style Icons Awards	Super Stylish Actor Male (Popular Choice)	Won	
2022	Pinkvilla Style Icons Awards	Super Stylish Inspirational Youth Idol - Male	Nominated	
2022	HT India's Most Stylish Awards	India's Most Stylish Popular Choice Award	Won	
2023	Bollywood Hungama Style Icons	Most Stylish Actor (Male)	Won	
2023	Bollywood Hungama Style Icons	Most Stylish Youth Icon (Male)	Nominated	
2024	FEF Global Fashion Awards	Fashion Ambassador of the Year	Won	
2026	IAA Leadership Awards	Brand Endorser of the Year	Won	

== Media recognitions ==
- 2012: Malhotra was ranked 12th in The Times of India's "50 Most Desirable Men" listing.
- 2013: Malhotra was voted as the most good looking debutant by the United Kingdom’s most popular poll conducted.
- 2013: Malhotra was placed 2nd in Filmfare's poll of the "Most Stylish Young Actor".
- 2015: Malhotra was roped in as Tourism New Zealand's brand ambassador for India, making him the first ever brand ambassador from India for the agency.
- 2023: Malhotra became the sixth most searched personality on Google in India.
