= Court Kacheri =

Indian drama web series

- Genre: Legal drama; Comedy
- Created by: Arunabh Kumar (TVF)
- Directed by: Ruchir Arun
- Starring: Pavan Malhotra; Ashish Verma
- Country of origin: India
- Original language: Hindi

Production
- Executive producers: Vijay Koshy; Shreyansh Pandey
- Producer: Arunabh Kumar
- Production company: The Viral Fever (TVF)

Original release
- Network: Sony LIV
- Release: 13 August 2025

Court Kacheri is an Indian Hindi-language legal drama web series created by Arunabh Kumar of TVF and directed by Ruchir Arun. It stars Pavan Malhotra and Ashish Verma in lead roles. The series explores intergenerational conflict and legacy within a small-town courtroom setting.It premiered on the OTT platform Sony LIV on 13 August 2025.

== Premise ==
Set in a district courtroom in a small town, the series follows Param, a reluctant young man propelled into the legal profession by his father, veteran advocate Harish Mathur. Against murky justice and familial pressure, Param must decide if he should reject—or embrace—his legacy.

== Cast ==
- Pavan Malhotra as Harish Mathur
- Ashish Verma as Param
- Puneet Batra
- Priyasha Bharadwaj
- Bhushan Vikas
- Kiran Khoje
- Pranav Malviya
- Sumali Khaniwale
- Anandeshwar Dwivedi

== Production ==
Developed by TVF and produced by Arunabh Kumar under the TVF banner, Court Kacheri was announced in early August 2025. The writers for the series include Puneet Batra, Anurag Ramesh Shukla, Akshay Anand Kohli, and Anurag Jha. Vijay Koshy and Shreyansh Pandey serve as executive producers. The official trailer was released on 2 August 2025.

== Release ==
The series began streaming exclusively on Sony LIV on 13 August 2025.

== Reception ==
- Sumit Rajguru of Times Now News rated 4 out of 5 stars and wrote 'Court Kacheri is a legally perfect drama on a father and son’s unusual bond. Pavan Malhotra and Ashish Verma did outstanding jobs in the web series, which is highly entertaining due to its amazing story, screenplay and direction.'
- Amit Bhatia of ABPLive gave 3.5 out of 5 stars and reviewed it as "It is more than just another courtroom drama - it’s a heartfelt family story wrapped in lively legal proceedings".
- Archika Khurana of The Times of India gave a rating of 3 out of 5, describing it as "a watchable, heartfelt legal dramedy with decent performances and an authentic small-town courtroom setting."
- Shweta Keshri of India Today gave it 3 out of 5, reviewed it as 'Strong performances drive legal dramedy on father-son conflict'.
- Sameer Ahire of Movie Talkies rated the series 3 out of 5, describing it as “a lighthearted courtroom drama, sprinkled with heartfelt and comedic moments.”

== See also ==
- List of productions by The Viral Fever
