= TG Keerthi Kumar =

Indian film director

- Occupations: Director; writer
- Years active: 2014-present

T. G. Keerthi Kumar (born 8 March 1984) is an Indian film director, predominantly working in Telugu cinema. He is known for directing Malli Modalaindi (2021).

== Personal life ==
Keerthi Kumar was born in Chennai. He graduated from St.Joseph's Engineering College, Chennai and post-graduated from Loyola College, Chennai.

== Career ==
Keerthi Kumar made his Tamil directorial debut with Oru Modhal Oru Kadhal in 2014. He made his Telugu directorial debut with Malli Modalaindi is a tale of love finding love after divorce, that streamed on ZEE5 on 11 February 2022. He stated that he was inspired to write Malli Modalandi based on a real incident in the life of his friend, who got divorced and married later. He worked on the script in lockdown.

== Filmography ==
Year	Title	Language	Director	Writer	Notes
2014	Oru Modhal Oru Kadhal	Tamil	Yes	Yes	
2018	Pedavi Datani Matokatundhi	Telugu	No	Yes	
2021	Malli Modalaindi	Telugu	Yes	Yes	ZEE5 Original film
2024	Chaari 111	Telugu	Yes	Yes	
