= Bravehearts: The Untold Stories of Heroes =

Indian television series

- Promotional poster
- Genre: Drama
- Written by: Aman Dhaiya; Harman Singha; Sankalp Raj Tripathi
- Directed by: Bharat Misra; Happie Mongia
- Starring: see below
- Theme music composer: Karthik Rao
- Country of origin: India
- Original language: Hindi
- No. of seasons: 1
- No. of episodes: 5

Production
- Producers: Anirudh Pandita; Ashwin Suresh
- Cinematography: Abhijeet Chaudhari
- Editors: Jaicy Mathew; Puneet Mehta
- Running time: 30 minutes
- Production company: Pocket Aces Pictures

Original release
- Network: Dice Media
- Release: 4 June – 28 June 2022

Bravehearts: The Untold Stories of Heroes is an Indian anthology streaming television series premiered on 4 June 2022 on Dice Media. The series features five stand-alone episodes and stars Shakti Kapoor, Omkar Kulkarni, Anushka Kaushik, Anup Soni, Naman Jain and Aadhya Anand.

== Cast ==
Episode 1: Masterji

- Shakti Kapoor as Masterji
- Omkar Kulkarni as Kishore
- Dharmendra Jaiswal as Caretaker
- Mohammad Hussain as Orphan Friend 1
- Palash Kamble as Orphan Friend 2
- Ravi Pandey as Orphan Friend 3
- Sayandeep Sengupta as Major Bhanu

Episode 2: Jaldi Lautna, Captain

- Anushka Kaushik as Vibha
- Varun Tewari as Vikrant
- Aashish Bhatia as Capt. Ajit
- Amulya Prabhu as Vibha's Friend 1
- Anuradha Rajadhyaksha as Vinni
- Barsha Chatterjee as Mrs. Singh
- Charudutt Sapra as Maj. Ahuja
- Girish Sharma as Col. Ronit Singh
- Gunjan Saini as Vibha's Friend 2
- Kavita Pais as Arti
- Sunit Razdan as Ashok

Episode 3: Shooter Jawan

- Anup Soni as Tribhuvan
- Rohit Pargai as Amar
- Himanshu Gokani as Sarpanch
- Kapil Punjabi as Virendra
- Mahendra Vaswani as Rishabh's Father
- Manish Tiwari as Bimal
- Pankaj Kumar Lakhani as Mahendra
- Sankalp Tripathi as Thekedar
- Trupti Jadhav as Tinku's Mother
- Uday Mourya as Tinku's Father

Episode 4: Sarhad Ke Baad Bhi

- Gireesh Sahdev as Balram
- Naman Jain as Aman
- Nazneen Madan as Meera
- Rohit Tiwari as Lt. Col. Gill

Episode 5: Veera

- Aadhya Anand as Veera
- Kk Raina as Jagdeep
- Suchitra Krishnamoorthi as Shalini
- Bharat Mishra as Journalist 2
- Kasturi Banerjjee as Journalist 1
- Sankalp Raj Tripathi as Voice of Sanjeev Acharya
- Vikas Gaur as Sanjeev Acharya

== Episodes ==
No.	Title	Directed by	Original release date
1	"Masterji"	Bharat Misra and Happie Mongia	4 June 2022
2	"Jaldi Lautna, Captain"	Bharat Misra and Happie Mongia	9 June 2022
3	"Shooter Jawan"	Bharat Misra and Happie Mongia	14 June 2022
4	"Sarhad Ke Baad Bhi"	Bharat Misra and Happie Mongia	21 June 2022
5	"Veera"	Bharat Misra and Happie Mongia	28 June 2022

== Reception ==
Prateek Sur of Outlook India rated the series 3/5 stars.
