= Hostel Days =

2024 Telugu comedy drama TV series

- Genre: Adult comedy-drama
- Written by: Akshay Poolla
- Directed by: Aditya Mandala
- Starring: Darahas Maturu; Akshay Lagusani; Mouli Tanuj Prasanth; Anannyaa Akulaa; Aishwarya Hollakal; Jaiyetri Makana
- Music by: Sidhartha Sadasivuni
- Country of origin: India
- Original language: Telugu
- No. of seasons: 1
- No. of episodes: 5

Production
- Producer: Arunabh Kumar
- Cinematography: Fahad Abdul Majeed
- Editor: Surya Vinay
- Running time: 30 minute
- Production company: The Viral Fever

Original release
- Network: Amazon Prime Video
- Release: 13 July 2023

Related
- Hostel Daze; Engga Hostel

Hostel Days is a 2023 Indian Telugu adaptation of the popular Indian Hindi-language comedy drama television miniseries Hostel Daze. The series is directed by Aditya Mandala and produced by Arubabh Kumar. It features an ensemble cast including Darahas Maturu, Akshay Lagusani, Mouli Tanuj Prasanth, Anannyaa Akulaa, Aishwarya Hollakal, and Jaiyetri Makana. The series, written by Akshay Poolla, The first trailer was released on 7 July 2023 and series premiered on Amazon Prime Video on July 13, 2023.

== Synopsis ==
Hostel Days unfolds the lives of six students navigating the challenges of hostel life in an engineering college. The characters, each with their unique personalities, share experiences of trials, identity struggles, friendships, love, and academic endeavors. The narrative explores relatable oddities, strange obstacles, confrontations, and conflicts, providing a humorous glimpse into the world of college life.

== Cast ==
- Darahas Maturu as Sai Ram
- Akshay Lagusani as Naveen Yadav
- Mouli Tanuj Prasanth as Chitranjan Bhattachary
- Anannyaa Akulaa as Theppa
- Aishwarya Hollakal as Kavya
- Jaiyetri Makana as Rithika

=== Recurring cast ===
- Rajeev Kanakala as Xerox Shop Uncle
- Raghu Karumanchi as Sweeper Babai
- Jhansi as Canteen Aunty
- Thagubothu Ramesh Security Anna
- Harsha Chemudu Computer Lab Assistant

== Episodes ==
=== Season 1 ===
| Series | Episodes | Originally released |
|---|---|---|
| 1 | 5 | 26 January 2023 |

| No. overall | No. in season | Title | Directed by | Original release date |
|---|---|---|---|---|
| 1 | 1 | "Room No. 209" | Aditya Mandala | 13 July 2023 |
| 2 | 2 | "Rakshakudu" | Aditya Mandala | 13 July 2023 |
| 3 | 3 | "First Love" | Aditya Mandala | 13 July 2023 |
| 4 | 4 | "GRP" | Aditya Mandala | 13 July 2023 |
| 5 | 5 | "M1 Exam" | Aditya Mandala | 13 July 2023 |

== Reception ==
Hostel Days received mixed reviews from critics. The series has been commended for its attempts to depict hostel life, with Darahas Maturu and Anannyaa Akulaa's portrayal earning praises. Some reviewers have appreciated the exploration of different perspectives, including a focus on female characters. However, opinions on the overall execution vary, with some acknowledging its relatable elements and others finding it a passable show.

== See also ==
- Hostel Daze
- Engga Hostel
