= Ji Sirji! =

- Starring: See below
- Country of origin: India
- Original language: Hindi
- No. of seasons: 1
- No. of episodes: 26

Production
- Production locations: Mumbai, Maharashtra, India
- Camera setup: Multi-camera

Original release
- Network: BIG Magic
- Release: 11 November 2015

Ji Sirji! is an Indian comedy television series, which premiered on 11 November 2015, and is broadcast on BIG Magic and BIG FM 92.7.

Anup Soni is the protagonist in the series. The series is bound together Anup Soni, who himself takes on the position of Boss.

== Cast ==
- Anup Soni
- Gaurav Sharma
