= Anup Soni =

Indian actor and anchor (born 1975)

Anoop Soni
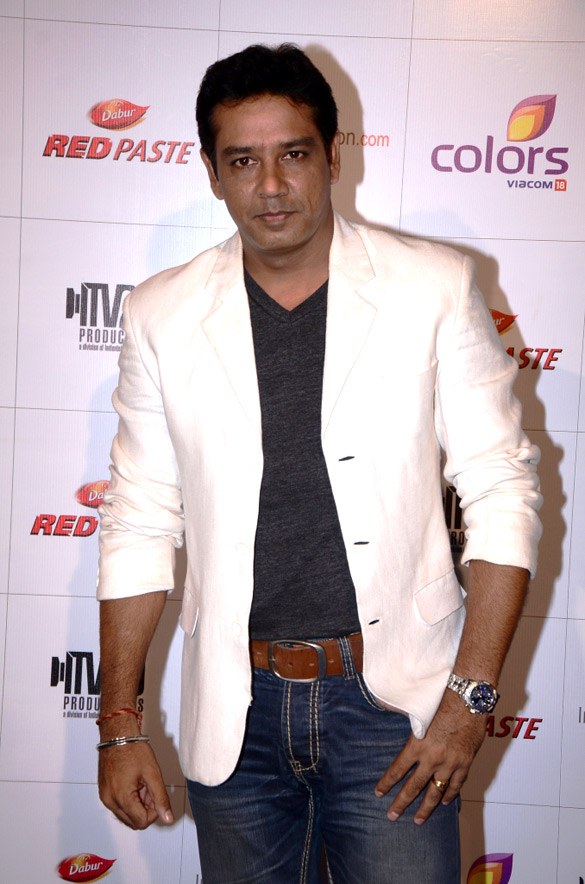
- Soni at the Colors Indian Telly Awards, 2012
- Born: Ludhiana, Punjab, India
- Occupations: Actor, model
- Years active: 1993–present
- Known for: Crime Patrol; CID Special Bureau; Balika Vadhu
- Height: 5 ft 10 in (1.78 m)
- Spouse(s): Ritu Soni (m. 1999; div. 2010) Juhi Babbar (m. 2011)
- Children: 3

Anup Soni is an Indian actor and anchor. He is an alumnus of the National School of Drama. Soni began his career with roles in television serials such as Sea Hawks and Saaya. He then took a break from television to work in films. He appeared in the 2003 films Kharaashein: Scars From Riots, Hum Pyar Tumhi Se Kar Baithe as well as Hathyar. In 2004, he appeared in Ashoke Pandit's film Sheen. But he returned to television to work in CID: Special Bureau. He continues working both in films and television, and he previously worked in the serial Crime Patrol on Sony.

== Personal life ==
Anup Soni married Ritu Soni in 1999. He has two daughters from this marriage: Zoya (born 2004) and Myra (born 2008). The couple got divorced in 2010.

Within a few months, on 14 March 2011, Soni married Juhi Babbar in a quiet ceremony attended only by family and close friends. Juhi Babbar is the daughter of actor-turned-politician Raj Babbar and was formerly married to film director Bejoy Nambiar. Soni and Babbar met while working in a play produced by Nadira Babbar (Juhi's mother). In 2012, Juhi gave birth to their son Imaan.

== Filmography ==
Key
†	Denotes films that have not yet been released

=== Films ===
Year	Title	Role	References
1999	Godmother	Meru Bhai	
2000	Fiza		
2001	Deewaanapan		
2002	Raaz		
2002	Hathyar	Fracture Nagya	
2002	Kharaashein: Scars From Riots		
2002	Hum Pyar Tumhi Se Kar Baithe		
2003	Gangaajal	Inspector Neelkanth Tiwari	
2003	Kagaar: Life on the Edge	Adi	
2003	Khushi	Vicky	
2003	Footpath	Police Inspector Singh	
2003	Inteha	Rohit	
2004	Des Hoyaa Pardes	SHO Randhawa	
2004	Sheen	Shuakat	
2005	Karkash		
2005	Apaharan		
2006	Tathastu		
2007	Dus Kahaniyaan		Anthology film, story Rice Plate
2009	Chal Chalein		
2010	Sukhmani: Hope for Life		
2010	Striker	Chandrakant Sarang	
2019	Prassthanam	Shiv	
2019	Fatteshikast	Shaista Khan	Movie on ZEE5
2020	Class of '83		
2020	Khaali Peeli	Ravi / Babuji	
2021	Satyameva Jayate 2	DCP Rajmohan Upadhyay	
2022	Saas Bahu Achaar Pvt. Ltd.	Dilip	
2024	Mirg		
2025	The Great Shamsuddin Family	Tauseef	Cameo
2026	Krishnavataram Part 1: The Heart (Hridayam)	Dhritarashtra, blind king of Hastinapur	
2026	The Vvaan: Force of the Forrest	Shashi Bhaiya	

=== Television ===
Year	Title	Role	Notes
1994	Shanti	Shekhar	
1994	Tehkikaat		Episodes 30 and 31
1996–1997	Aahat	Mohan / Serial Killer / Akash	Season 1 Episodes 35, 55, 80 and 81
1997	Sea Hawks	ACP Kumar	
1997	Byomkesh Bakshi	Nikhil	Season 2 Episode 19
1997–1999	Saturday Suspense		Episode 2
1997–1999	Saturday Suspense	Ashish	Episode 61
1997–1999	Saturday Suspense	Inspector Joshi	Episode 64
1997–1999	Saturday Suspense	Crime Branch Insp. Anirudh	Episode 76
1997–1999	Saturday Suspense	Adv. Akash Verma	Episode 80
1997–1999	Saturday Suspense	Vilas Thapar	Episodes 107 and 108
1998–1999	Saaya	Prakash	Sudha's brother
2000	I Love You	Siddharth	
2002	CID	ACP Ajatshatru	Episodes 207 and 208
2004	Remix	Raghav Dutt	
2004	Raat Hone Ko Hai		
2006–2007	Kahaani Ghar Ghar Kii	Suyash Mehra	400 episodes
2008–2014	Balika Vadhu	Bhairon Dharamveer Singh	
2009	Comedy Circus	Himself	
2009–2010	Shraddha	Ajay Khurana	
2010–2020	Crime Patrol	Host	
2011–2012	Kahani Comedy Circus Ki	Himself	
2015	Ji Sirji!		

=== Web series ===
Year	Title	Role	Platform	Notes
2017	The Test Case	Lt. Col Imtiaz Hussain	AltBalaji	
2019	Bombers	Manik Dasgupta	ZEE5	
2021	Tandav	Kailash Kumar	Amazon Prime	
2021	Ram Yug	Parashurama	MX Player	
2021	Dhindora	Himself	YouTube	
2021	1962: The War in the Hills	Major Khattar	Hotstar	
2022	Bravehearts: The Untold Stories of Heroes	Tribhuvan	Dice Media	
2022	Saas Bahu Achaar Pvt. Ltd.	Dileep	ZEE5	
2022	Khakee: The Bihar Chapter	DIG Sudhir Paswan	Netflix	
2025	Saare Jahan Se Accha: The Silent Guardians	Brigadier Naushad Javed Ahmed	Netflix	
2026	Shaque: Trust No One	Khurana	Netflix	

== Plays ==
Year	Title	Role
2022	My Wife's 8th Vachan	Madhur

== Television host ==
He has hosted the popular real-life-based crime show Crime Patrol since 2010 and he became so popular among viewers as the host of the show. In 2018, he decided to exit the show citing that currently, he wants to focus on his acting career in films and other TV shows. Since his exit, the show is now aired by actors like Divyanka Tripathi and Sonali Kulkarni.

== Awards ==
- 2010: Gold Awards - Best Actor in Supporting Role (Male) - Balika Vadhu
