= Priyasha Bhardwaj =

Indian actress

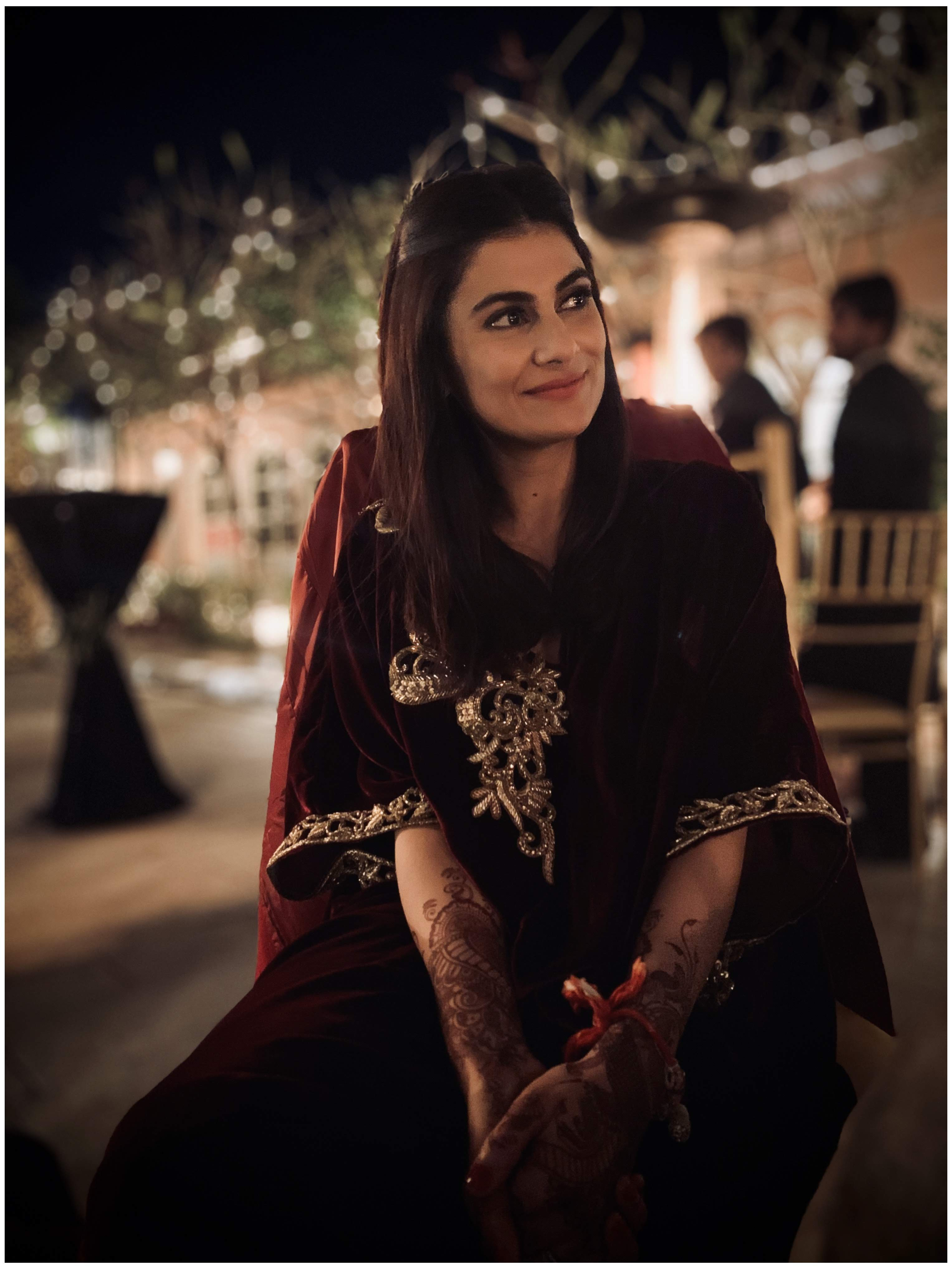
- Born: India
- Occupation: Actress
- Years active: 2019–present

Priyasha Bhardwaj is an Indian actress who primarily works in Hindi television and web series. She gained recognition for her role as Saundarya in the Disney+ Hotstar series Aarya (2020). Priyasha later worked in various web series like Mirzapur and Saas Bahu Aur Flamingo. She is also known for her role as Inspector Bhoomi in Hindi TV Series CID.

== Early life and education ==
She grew up in Assam but later moved to Mumbai to pursue a career in acting. Before entering the entertainment industry, she worked in corporate sector.

Bhardwaj has appeared in numerous ads, including UNICEF's Motherhood Stories.

In addition to her screen work, Bhardwaj is also an active theatre artist. She is known for her clowning performance Fool Time Actoré, which was based on the everyday life of an actor through a clowning-based narrative.

== Filmography ==
=== Television ===
Year	Title	Role	Notes	Ref.
2025	C.I.D	Inspector Bhoomi		

=== Web ===
Year	Title	Role	Notes	Ref.
2019	Kaafir			
2019	Mirzapur 2		Season 2	
2019	Made in Heaven			
2020	Aarya (2020)	Saundarya Singh Rathore	Season 1	
2021	Love J Action	Nayan		
2021	Call My Agent			
2023	Jehanabad	Ragini Awasthi		
2023	Saas, Bahu Aur Flamingo	Young Savitri		
2025	TVF Court Kacheri	Advocate Anusha Ghanshyam		
