= Ankit, Pallavi & Friends =

Ankit, Pallavi & Friends...
- DVD cover
- Directed by: Hari Yelleti
- Produced by: Kishore Ganji
- Starring: Nikhil Siddhartha; Megha Burman
- Cinematography: Malini Dasari
- Edited by: Marthand K. Venkatesh
- Music by: Vinu Thomas
- Release date: 5 September 2008
- Country: India
- Language: Telugu

Ankit, Pallavi & Friends is a 2008 Indian Telugu-language film directed by debutant Hari Yelleti. It stars Nikhil Siddhartha and Megha Burman in the lead roles. Set in contemporary times, it follows the lives of five friends pursuing their post-college dreams, tracing their friendships, love lives, and careers. The film released on 5 September 2008.

== Plot ==
Ankit is a carefree youngster who likes to live on his terms. He aspires to become a renowned musician. His parents support him. Pallavi is an exact opposite of Ankit. While Ankit believes in living life to the fullest, without a care in the world, Pallavi is seen working hard all the time. She is a software engineer in a big multinational.

The two are childhood friends and they have three other common friends. One wants to go to the US at any cost and is all the time making trips to the US consulate for a visa. The other wants to do social service. The third dreams of starting his own business but does not know what business to enter.

Over a period of time, Ankit and Pallavi fall in love. But Pallavi does not like the carefree attitude of Ankit and his casual approach to life. She chides him for this and tells him that unless he takes his life seriously, she will leave him. They part ways at the interval.

As luck would have it, Ankit manages to land an offer to compose the music for a programme being conducted by UNICEF for an orphanage. His friend manages to land a job at the same orphanage. The orphanage is run by Sita.

Ankit becomes a big star after the success of his musical show. He is now a celebrity. Pallavi still longs to be with Ankit but is afraid to meet him as she thinks that Ankit will misunderstand her for coming to him only after seeing his success. Ankit also misses Pallavi very badly. The friends then plan a party and invite both Ankit and Pallavi, with the hope of bringing them together and become successful.

The film argues that happiness is a choice and that it is right around us only if we choose to pick it. It opened to good reviews.

== Cast ==
- Nikhil Siddhartha as Ankit Adesara
- Megha Burman as Pallavi
- Ping Pong Surya as Ravi
- Venu Yeldandi as Sunil
- Pradeep as Gopi
- Naresh
- C. V. L. Narasimha Rao as Ankit's father
- Seetha as Sita
- Sivannarayana Naripeddi
- Santosh Pawan

== Production ==
The music of this film was composed by a relative newcomer, Vinu Thomas. The film was edited by Marthand K. Venkatesh, with Malini Dasari doing the cinematography.

== Music ==
The film has seven songs composed by Vinu Thomas.

- "Premani" - Karunya, Gayatri
- "Dost Hey Dost" - Ranjith, Geetha Madhuri, Balu Thankachan
- "Leletha Puvvule" - Karthik
- "Tell Me Em Kaavalo" - Ranjith, Geetha Madhuri, Balu Thankachan
- "Aalagake Allari Vayasa" - Pranavi, Balu Thankachan

== Release ==
Rediff gave the film a rating of two out of five stars and wrote that "The film is rather simplistic and tackles the situation between the lovers in a basic way. Perhaps Hari Yeleti could have added more dimensions to this love story to make it more engaging and appealing". The Hindu noted that "Overall, the movie disappoints".
