= Samyuktha Viswanathan =

Indian actress and dancer

- Born: Samyuktha Viswanathan; December 8, 1998 (age 27); Chennai, Tamil Nadu, India
- Education: New York University (Tisch School of the Arts)
- Occupations: Actress; Dancer
- Years active: 2021–present
- Known for: "Katchi Sera" (Music Video)

Samyuktha Viswanathan (born 8 December 1998) is an Indian actress who predominantly works in Tamil films and web series. She gained significant recognition for her appearance in the viral music video "Katchi Sera" (2024).

As an actress she is well known for her roles in films such as Oh Manapenne! (2021), Chaari 111 (2024), Vowels (2026) and Double Occupancy (2026).

== Early life and education ==
Samyuktha was born and brought up in Chennai, Tamil Nadu. She trained as a ballet dancer from the age of seven. However, following an injury that restricted her from pursuing dance professionally, she shifted her focus toward theatre and visual arts.

She pursued a degree in Visual Communication and subsequently studied Performance Studies at the Tisch School of the Arts at New York University. Before entering the film industry, she worked with "The Little Theatre," a non-profit theatre company based in Chennai.

== Career ==
Samyuktha began her acting career with web series. She appeared in the Tamil series I Hate You I Love You (2021) and Engga Hostel (2023). Her breakthrough performance came in the 2023 Amazon Prime Video anthology series Modern Love Chennai. She starred in the segment directed by Krishnakumar Ramakumar.

In 2024, Samyuktha garnered widespread popularity after featuring in the independent music video "Katchi Sera" by Sai Abhyankkar. The song went viral on social media platforms, significantly boosting her public profile.

She made her debut in Telugu cinema with the spy-comedy film Chaari 111 (2024), starring alongside Vennela Kishore. She was also cast in the second season of the series Suzhal: The Vortex.

In 2026, she made her official lead role in the fantasy romantic comedy film Double Occupancy which was directed by Aswin Kandasamy and produced by Khushbu Sundar.

== Filmography ==
=== Films ===
Year	Title	Role	Language	Notes	Ref.
2021	Oh Manapenne!	Aditi	Tamil	Debut film	
2024	Chaari 111	Agent Esha	Telugu		
2026	Vowels	Ashwathi	Tamil	Anthology film; segment: "Varnajaalam"	
2026	Double Occupancy	Priya	Tamil		
2026	I'm Game	Tharini	Malayalam		
2026	Mr. Bhaarath †	TBA	Tamil	Filming	

=== Web Series ===
Year	Title	Role	Platform	Language	Notes
2021	I Hate You I Love You	Shalini	YouTube	Tamil	
2023	Engga Hostel	Ahaana	Amazon Prime Video	Tamil	
2023	Modern Love Chennai	Roja	Amazon Prime Video	Tamil	Anthology series; segment "Kaadhal Enbadhu Kannula Heart Irukkura Emoji"
2023	Sweet Kaaram Coffee	Young Kaveri	Amazon Prime Video	Tamil	
2024	Chutney Sambar	Jensi	Disney+ Hotstar	Tamil	
2025	Suzhal: The Vortex season 2	Naachi	Amazon Prime Video	Tamil	

=== Music Videos ===
Year	Title	Artist	Notes
2022	"Nenjaan Kootula"	—N/a	
2024	"Katchi Sera"	Sai Abhyankkar	
