= Pedavi Datani Matokatundhi =

- Theatrical release poster
- Directed by: T Guru Prasad
- Screenplay by: TG Keerthi Kumar
- Story by: TG Keerthi Kumar
- Produced by: Aditi; TG Keerthi Kumar
- Starring: Raavan Reddy; Payal Wadhwa; Naresh
- Cinematography: Naman-Yatin
- Edited by: Nirmal Kumar
- Music by: Zenith Reddy
- Production company: Film Monks Entertainment Private Limited
- Release date: 27 July 2018
- Running time: 124 minutes
- Country: India
- Language: Telugu

Pedavi Datani Matokatundhi (transl. I Have a word which didn't cross my lips) is an Indian Telugu-language, fantasy romantic comedy film directed by T Guru Prasad, written by TG Keerthi Kumar and produced by Aditi and TG Keerthi Kumar. It features Raavan Reddy and Payal Wadhwa and Naresh in the lead roles. The film was released on 27 July 2018.

== Plot ==
Tarun is a stud and a famous musician during high school days, but arrogant and rude to his classmates except to his best friend, Abhay (Moin). He rejects and insults love proposals of many girls, including Ahaana's (Payal Wadhwa). Sai (Maurice Sadiche), another classmate of his, seeks to join Tarun's music band but gets bullied by Tarun and Abhay in front of the class. Few years later, Tarun is a college dropout and works as Janitor with Abhay as an accountant, both in the same company with Sai, as their boss. Sai constantly insults Tarun at the workplace, to take revenge of the embarrassing high school incident. Tarun falls in love with same Ahaana, the girl who he rejected and insulted during school days. Ahaana is now a beautiful, independent girl who refuses to forgive Tarun for what he did to her. Tarun claims himself to be a loser with all the problems. His father (V.K.Naresh), who works in a CCTV agency, constantly scolds him and motivates him at the same time. One day, Tarun accidentally falls into a cupid curse. He has to complete a task of matching three couples within 48 hours or he can never tell Ahaana that he loves her or for that matter, get any kind of love life again. Tarun is on chase to complete the task and save himself from the curse, with the help of his cupid associate Bunty (Nandu Kumar). He manages to complete the task, comes out of the curse and makes Ahaana fall in love with him.

== Cast ==
- Raavan Reddy as Tarun
- Payal Wadhwa as Ahaana
- Naresh
- Moin Khan as Abhay
- Nandu Kumar as Bunty
- Priyanka Shukla as Consultant
- Maurice Sadiche as Sai
- Mohan Bagath as Vikky
- Govinda Raju as Tuition Master
- Shubh Saini as Anand
- Mahesh Mani as Janitor Student
- Aanand Sagare as Janitor Student
- Nandan as Janitor Student
- Surya Eswar as Janitor Student

== Soundtrack ==
This film has five songs composed by Zenith Reddy and lyrics are written by Rahman. Music released on Lahari Music.

Track listing
No.	Title	Lyrics	Artist(s)	Length
1.	"Arey Arey"	Rahman	Sathyaprakash Dharmar, Zenith Reddy	3:54
2.	"Easy Easy"	Rahman	Abhay Jodhpurkar	3:44
3.	"Dobbey Dobbey"	Rahul Ramakrishna, Shri	Zenith Reddy	4:37
4.	"Cupid Theme"	B. Madhunandhan	Zenith Reddy	1:37
5.	"Vaddu Vaddu"	Rahman	Ramu	4:38
Total length:				18:55

== Reception ==
A critic from 123telugu rated the film 2 1/4 out of 5 and wrote that "All in all, Pedavi Datani Matokatundi comes with a different concept but fails to pack a punch, owing to its ill-paced narration and confusing screenplay. The movie looks half-baked as it heads with no real direction".
