= Oru Modhal Oru Kadhal =

2014 Indian film by TG Keerthi Kumar

- Directed by: TG Keerthi Kumar
- Written by: TG Keerthi Kumar
- Produced by: RR; S.A. Jawahar Basha
- Starring: Vivek Rajgopal; Megha Burman
- Cinematography: Yugga H.
- Edited by: Sathyaraj
- Music by: K. R. Kawin Siva
- Release date: 14 March 2014
- Running time: 115 minutes
- Country: India
- Language: Tamil

Oru Modhal Oru Kadhal (transl. One collision, one love) is a 2014 Indian Tamil-language romantic comedy film written and directed by TG Keerthi Kumar and produced by RR under the banner of Kandan Gearup Entertainment. This film stars Vivek Rajgopal and Megha Burman.

It is loosely based on the love story of director and his wife.

== Plot ==
Oru Modhal Oru Kadhal is a story of Karthik, who falls in love with a girl, and their trouble-filled journey from Chennai to Bangalore to Delhi giving troubles to his friends and family, is portrayed hilariously.

== Cast ==
- Vivek Rajgopal as Karthik
- Megha Burman as Anusha
- Pyramid Natarajan as Karthik's father
- Meera Krishnan as Karthik's mother
- Swaminathan as Shrinivasan
- Imman Annachi
- Mamta Prasad as Anusha's aunt
- Ammu Ramachandran as Karthik's sister

== Soundtrack ==
Oru Modhal Oru Kadhal

Soundtrack album by K.R. Kawin
- Released: 29 January 2014
- Genre: Feature film soundtrack
- Label: Divo

The film has seven songs which were composed by K. R. Kawin Siva with lyrics for most songs by Dr. Piraisoodan. The centerpiece of the soundtrack is the Tamil-Hindi song "Punjabi Paartha", sung by Shankar Mahadevan and Sunidhi Chauhan, with lyrics by Aditi K.K.

Track#	Song	Singer(s)	Duration
1	"Punjabiya Partha"	Shankar Mahadevan, Sunidhi Chauhan	4:36
2	"Kalangathe Namba"	Velmurugan	4:41
3	"Crystal Vanilla"	Vijay Prakash, Sharky	5:27
4	"Appana Police Copu"	Tippu, Chinna Ponnu	5:25
5	"Kadhal Devathai"	KR. Kawin	3:32
6	"Punjabiya Partha (Club Mix)"	Shankar Mahadevan, Sunidhi Chauhan	4:29
7	"OMOK Theme"	KR. Kawin	0:52

== Reception ==
=== Critical response ===
The Times of India wrote that "The film often has the feel of an amateur effort, its humour is corny, the plot is weak, and the acting by the lead pair is strictly functional". Malini Mannath of The New Indian Express wrote that "Oru Modhal Oru Kadhal is a debutant director's efforts gone awry".
