= Mr. Bhaarath =

Upcoming Tamil film by Niranjan

- Theatrical release poster
- Directed by: Niranjan
- Written by: Niranjan
- Produced by: Sudhan Sundaram; Lokesh Kanagaraj; Jagadish Palanisamy
- Starring: Bhaarath; Samyuktha Viswanathan
- Cinematography: Om Narayan
- Edited by: Dhivakar Dennis
- Music by: Pranav Muniraj
- Production companies: Passion Studios; The Route; G Squad
- Release date: 11 December 2026
- Country: India
- Language: Tamil

Mr. Bhaarath is an upcoming Indian Tamil-language romantic comedy film written and directed by Niranjan in his debut. The film stars Bhaarath and Samyuktha Viswanathan in the lead roles, alongside Bala Saravanan, Nidhi Pradeep, R. Sundarrajan, Linga, Adithya Kathir and others in supporting roles. The film is jointly produced by Sudhan Sundaram and Jagadish Palanisamy under their Passion Studios and The Route banners respectively and presented by Lokesh Kanagaraj under his G Squad banner.

This film will be released on 11 December 2026.

== Cast ==
- Bhaarath
- Samyuktha Viswanathan
- Bala Saravanan
- Nidhi Pradeep
- R. Sundarrajan
- Linga
- Adithya Kathir

== Production ==
On 18 December 2024, an announcement was made regarding Lokesh Kanagaraj's next production venture under his G Squad banner titled Mr. Bhaarath. The film is said to be written and directed by Youtube-Channel Finally fame Niranjan, making his debut, starring Finally fame Bhaarath in the maiden lead role, who was last seen in supporting roles in Love Today and Prince (both 2022). Samyuktha Viswanathan was cast as the female lead, alongside Bala Saravanan, Nidhi Pradeep, R. Sundarrajan, Linga, Adithya Kathir and others in supporting roles.

The title of the film is a callback to the 1986 film by the same name starring Rajinikanth in the titular role and directed by S. P. Muthuraman. The film is jointly produced by Sudhan Sundaram and Jagadish Palanisamy under their Passion Studios and The Route banners respectively and presented by Lokesh Kanagaraj under G Squad banner. The technical team consists of cinematographer Om Narayan, editor Dhivakar Dennis, music composer Pranav Muniraj and art director Bhavna Govardan. Principal photography wrapped on 16 July 2025.

== Release ==
Mr. Bhaarath was originally scheduled for release on 1 October 2026, but on that date, the studio announced that the film had been postponed to avoid competition with other films released in the same week, with a new release date yet to be announced. In November 2026, it was announced that the film would be released on 11 December 2026.
