= Sidharth Malhotra =

Indian actor (born 1985)

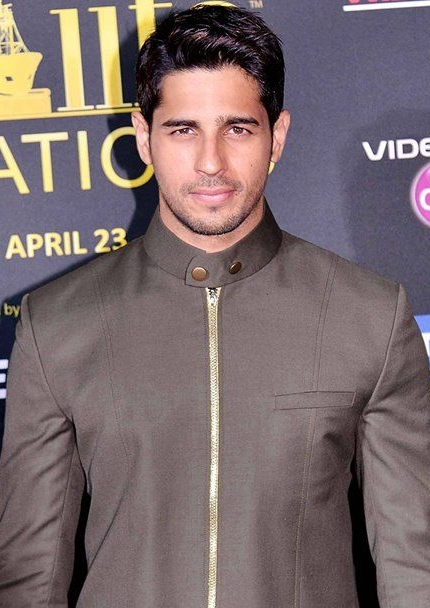
- Malhotra in 2014
- Born: 16 January 1985 (age 41); Delhi, India
- Education: Shaheed Bhagat Singh College
- Occupation: Actor
- Years active: 2012–present
- Spouse: Kiara Advani (m. 2023)
- Children: 1
- Awards: Full list

Sidharth Malhotra (Note: Hindi pronunciation: [sɪˈd̪ʱːaːrt̪ʰ məlˈɦoːt̪ra]) (born 16 January 1985) is an Indian actor who primarily works in Hindi films. He is the recipient of several accolades, including nominations for two Filmfare Awards. Malhotra appeared in Forbes India's Celebrity 100 list from 2016 to 2018.

Malhotra began his career as a fashion model but left it to pursue acting, working as an assistant director to Karan Johar in My Name Is Khan (2010). He made his acting debut with Johar's teen film Student of the Year (2012), a commercial success that earned him a nomination for the Filmfare Award for Best Male Debut. Following this, he achieved critical and commercial success in romantic comedy Hasee Toh Phasee (2014), thriller Ek Villain (2014), and family drama Kapoor & Sons (2016). This early success was followed by a career downturn and setback.

Malhotra then received critical acclaim for his portrayal of Vikram Batra in the war film Shershaah (2021), which also earned him nomination for the Filmfare Award for Best Actor. This was followed by three poorly received films. He has since expanded to web with Indian Police Force (2024) and had moderate success with the romantic comedy Param Sundari (2025).

Apart from acting, Malhotra is a brand ambassador for several products. He is married to actress Kiara Advani, with whom he has a daughter.

== Early life and work ==
Malhotra was born in Delhi, India into a Punjabi family, to Sunil Malhotra, a former captain in the Merchant Navy, and Rimma Malhotra, a homemaker. His father was a Hindu while his mother is Sikh, and he identifies with both religions, growing up being influenced by Ramayana stories through his paternal grandmother while he frequented Delhi's Gurdwara Bangla Sahib due to his mother's influence.

Malhotra was educated at Don Bosco School (Alaknanda, New Delhi), and at Naval Public School, Delhi. He then graduated from Shaheed Bhagat Singh College, Delhi. At the age of 18, he began modelling. Although he was successful, he decided to quit after four years because he was dissatisfied with the profession.

== Career ==
=== Breakthrough and early commercial success (2012–2016) ===
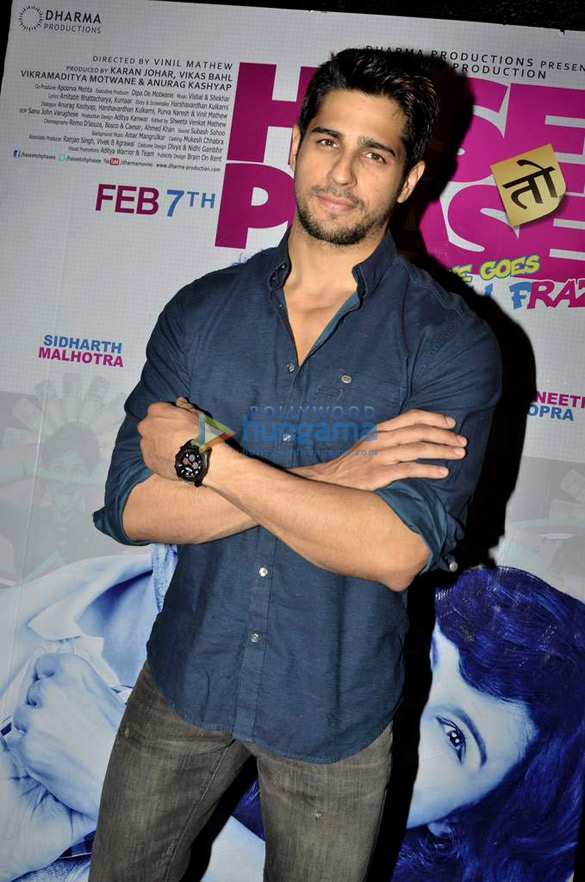
Malhotra promoting his film Hasee Toh Phasee in 2014

Keenly interested in pursuing a film career, Malhotra successfully auditioned for a film to be directed by Anubhav Sinha. However, the film was shelved, and he instead worked as an assistant director to Karan Johar on the 2010 film My Name Is Khan, where one of his fellow assistants was aspiring actor Varun Dhawan. In 2012, he made his film debut with Johar's teen drama Student of the Year alongside Alia Bhatt and Dhawan, both in their film debuts. He was cast as Abhimanyu Singh, a scholarship student, who competes with his wealthy best friends to win an annual school championship. Film critic Rajeev Masand of CNN-IBN considered his performance to be "earnest", adding that he had "a pleasing presence". Student of the Year was a financial success, grossing ₹1.09 billion (US$12 million) Worldwide. The film earned him several nominations including Filmfare Award for Best Male Debut and won him the Stardust Award for Breakthrough Performance – Male.

Following a year-long absence from the screen, Malhotra starred opposite Parineeti Chopra in the 2014 romantic comedy Hasee Toh Phasee, which tells the love story of a scientist and an under-confident aspiring businessman. Saibal Chatterjee of NDTV praised his screen presence and compared it to the early work of Amitabh Bachchan. While, Sukanya Verma found him to be "immensely likeable" as Nikhil. The film performed moderately well at the box office, with global revenues of ₹620 million (US$6.6 million). In the Mohit Suri-directed romantic thriller Ek Villain, he played Guru Divekar, a hardened criminal whose terminally-ill wife (played by Shraddha Kapoor) is murdered by a serial killer (played by Riteish Deshmukh). Shubhra Gupta of The Indian Express reviewed his performance as "watchable even if he has a hard time doing menace — he just seems so nice and wholesome all the time, even when he is crunching bones." The film became a commercial success with worldwide revenues of over ₹1.7 billion (US$18 million). The box office performance of the film established him as one of the most promising new actors of Hindi cinema.

Malhotra next appeared in a 2015 remake of the 2011 American film Warrior, titled Brothers, directed by Karan Malhotra and co-starring Akshay Kumar. The film received negative reviews and under-performed at the box office. Malhotra's next release, the Shakun Batra-directed family drama Kapoor & Sons (2016), proved to be a critical and commercial success, grossing ₹ 1.53 billion worldwide. Featuring an ensemble cast including Fawad Khan, and Alia Bhatt, the film tells the story of two brothers of contrasting personalities (Malhotra and Khan) who return home to their dysfunctional family after their grandfather suffers from a cardiac arrest. A reviewer for India Today thought that Malhotra was overshadowed by Khan in the film, though Namrata Joshi of The Hindu wrote that "he holds his own with his solid presence and vulnerable glances".

=== Career fluctuations (2016–2020) ===
Malhotra followed the success of Kapoor & Sons with a starring role in the romantic comedy Baar Baar Dekho alongside Katrina Kaif, playing a time-travelling mathematician. Directed by Nitya Mehra, the film was poorly received and Shubhra Gupta was critical of his "one-note performance". Later in 2017, he starred in dual roles for the first time in the action comedy A Gentleman with Jacqueline Fernandez from the writer-director duo Raj Nidimoru and Krishna D.K., which was produced by Fox Star Studios; although highly anticipated, it opened to a poor reception. Rachit Gupta of Filmfare stated Malhotra does everything expected from a "commercial film hero". Both films were box-office bombs.

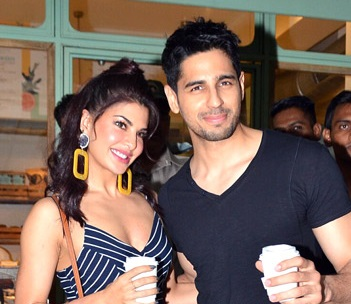
Malhotra with his co-star Jacqueline Fernandez at a promotional event for their film A Gentleman in 2017

In a 2017 remake of the 1969 mystery film Ittefaq, Malhotra starred alongside Sonakshi Sinha and Akshaye Khanna. Released in 2017, the film was positively received by critics, where a critic from India Today praised his performance but cited Khanna as the "star of the film". Ittefaq underperformed at the box office with a lifetime collection of ₹ 500 million. Neeraj Pandey's Aiyaary (2018) featured Malhotra along with Manoj Bajpayee and Rakul Preet Singh. In a mixed review, Rohit Vats of Hindustan Times stated, "As an earnest apprentice, Malhotra begins well but can’t hold on to it for long. Like most of the other actors, he too falls prey to a confused screenplay."

Malhotra had two releases in 2019. He first starred in the romantic-comedy Jabariya Jodi, his second collaboration with Parineeti Chopra. The film had negative reviews and was considered a flop. Nandini Ramnath felt his character was too wispy to leave any traces. His second appearance was in Milap Milan Zaveri's action film Marjaavaan, co-starring Ritesh Deshmukh and Tara Sutaria. Ronak Kotecha criticised the "one-note" nature of his overly commercialized character but was appreciative of his "honest performance". Marjaavaan was a box office success.

=== Shershaah and subsequent film projects (2021–present) ===
In 2021, Malhotra had a lead role in the biographical war film Shershaah, based on the life of the Indian army officer Vikram Batra. Malhotra portrayed dual roles of Vikram Batra opposite Kiara Advani and his brother Vishal Batra. After several delays due to the COVID-19 pandemic, the film premiered on Amazon Prime Video. It received mixed reviews from critics. Praise was directed at Malhotra's performance in particular, with Saibal Chatterjee writing that he "has what it takes to flesh out a real-life martyr who has left behind a larger-than-life aura". Shershaah was the most-watched film on Prime Video in India at the time of its release. The film also earned him his first nomination for the Filmfare Award for Best Actor.

Malhotra's sole film release of 2022 was the fantasy comedy Thank God, co-starring Ajay Devgn, which failed commercially. The following year, he played an Indian spy stationed in Pakistan before the Indo-Pakistani War of 1971 in the thriller Mission Majnu. Following several delays from its planned theatrical release, the film was ultimately released on Netflix. Monika Rawal Kukreja of Hindustan Times compared it unfavourably to Shershaah and stated that Malhotra was let down by the script despite being in "top form, with a charming onscreen presence". In 2024, Malhotra led the police procedural series Indian Police Force, created by Rohit Shetty for Amazon Prime Video. The Hindu's Shilajit Mitra found a "decency in Malhotra that’s refreshing for a Rohit Shetty protagonist", but bemoaned that he "strains at playing broad". He once again played a heroic army officer in the action film Yodha, terming such parts his focus as an actor. In a mixed review for the film, The Wire's Puja Awasthi termed him "the most dependable action hero among his contemporaries". Yodha failed commercially.

In 2025, Malhotra starred in Param Sundari, opposite Janhvi Kapoor as a man who creates a fraudulent matchmaking app, leading him to be paired with a South Indian woman already engaged to someone else. The film faced substantial online backlash for perpetuating regressive stereotypes about South Indian culture, especially in its depiction of Kapoor's character, Sundari. WION's Shomini Sen described Malhotra as "limited in the acting department" and found his portrayal of the archetypal Punjabi man to be weaker than that of his contemporaries. Additionally, critics lamented the lack of chemistry between the lead pair. Param Sundari emerged as a moderate commercial success.

Malhotra portrayed Rishi, a man who returns to his ancestral village in The Vvaan: Force of the Forrest opposite Tamannaah Bhatia, his only release of 2026. The film is inspired by the folklore of the Van Devi Temple. Chirag Sehgal of News18 reviewed, "Malhotra does his part well, handling both the dramatic and lighter portions with sincerity, Though the screenplay doesn’t offer him enough".

== Personal life ==
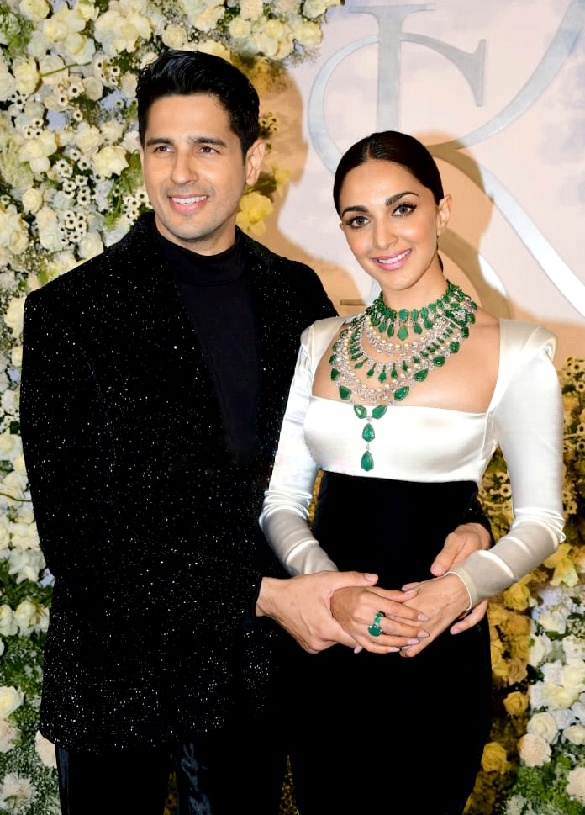
Malhotra with wife Kiara Advani at their wedding reception in Mumbai

In the late 2010s, Malhotra was rumoured to be dating actress Alia Bhatt. He confirmed the relationship in 2019, after they had broken up.

Rumours of him dating actress Kiara Advani began in 2020, but he did not publicly speak about the relationship. On 7 February 2023, they married in Jaisalmer, Rajasthan in a traditional Hindu wedding ceremony. Their wedding received widespread media attention, resulting in their official wedding pictures being the most-liked Instagram post in India till date. The couple welcomed their first child, a daughter, Saraayah, on 15 July 2025.

== Other work and public image ==
Kunal Purandare and Angad Singh from Forbes India noted that Malhotra has " firmly entrenched in the A-list of Bollywood". Sangeeta Wadhwani of Hello! stated, "Sidharth arrived on Planet Bollywood with all the attributes of a star. Those Punjabi roots, a hunger to make it big, the willingness to put in the hard work." The Indian Express also stated that Shershaah proved to be a major breakthrough in Malhotra's career. From 2016 to 2018, he appeared in Forbes India's Celebrity 100 list. He debuted at the 74th position with an estimated annual income of ₹96.3 million (US$1.0 million). In 2018, with an estimated annual income of ₹216.7 million (US$2.3 million), he peaked at the 37th position.

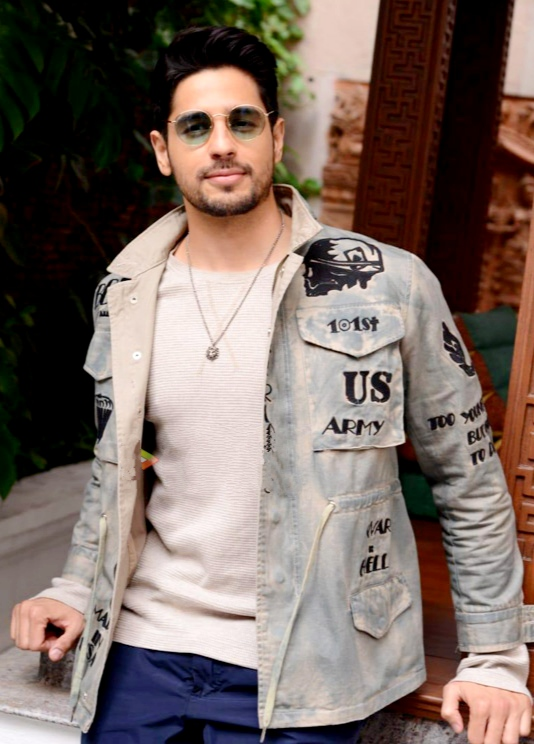
Malhotra in 2019

Malhotra is known for his fashion style and is considered among the most stylish Bollywood actors. In 2013, he was placed 2nd in Filmfare's poll of the "Most Stylish Young Actor". Malhotra has frequently appeared on Times' Most Desirable Men list. He was placed 5th in 2017, 10th in 2018, 8th in 2019 and 10th in 2020. Additionally, he regularly features in the British magazine Eastern Eye's listing of the "50 Sexiest Asian Men in the World". He has been placed 5th in 2012, 15th in 2014, 23rd in 2017 and 12th in 2018. In 2024, he was placed 52nd on IMDb's List of 100 Most Viewed Indian Stars.

Malhotra is a prominent celebrity endorser for brands and products including Pepe Jeans, Brylcream, Oppo, Metro Shoes, Coca-Cola and Movado. In 2023, Malhotra became the sixth most searched personality on Google in India. In 2013, Malhotra collaborated with PETA for a campaign to spread awareness about dogs sterilisation. Later that year, he participated in a stage show in Hong Kong alongside Varun Dhawan and Alia Bhatt and performed at a charity event with Dhawan, Bhatt, Aditya Roy Kapur, Shraddha Kapoor and Huma Qureshi to raise funds for the flood-affected victims of Uttarakhand. In August 2016, he performed in various cities of United States for the "Dream Team 2016" tour, alongside Karan Johar, actors Dhawan, Bhatt, Roy Kapur, Parineeti Chopra, Katrina Kaif, and the singer Badshah.

== Filmography ==
Key
†	Denotes films that have not yet been released

=== Films ===
Year	Title	Role	Notes	Ref.
2010	My Name Is Khan	—N/a	Assistant director	
2012	Student of the Year	Abhimanyu Singh		
2014	Hasee Toh Phasee	Nikhil Bharadwaj		
2014	Ek Villain	Guru Divekar		
2015	Brothers	Monty Fernandes		
2016	Kapoor & Sons	Arjun Kapoor		
2016	Baar Baar Dekho	Jai Varma		
2017	A Gentleman	Gaurav Kapoor alias Rishi Purohit	Also playback singer for the song "Bandook Meri Laila"	
2017	Ittefaq	Vikram Sethi		
2018	Aiyaary	Major Jai Bakshi		
2019	Jabariya Jodi	Abhay Singh		
2019	Marjaavaan	Raghuvendra Nath		
2021	Shershaah	Vikram Batra and Vishal Batra (Note: Malhotra played dual roles in the film.)		
2022	Thank God	Ayaan Kapoor		
2023	Mission Majnu	Amandeep Ajitpal Singh alias Tariq		
2024	Yodha	Arun Katyal		
2025	Param Sundari	Param Sachdev		
2026	The Vvaan: Force of the Forrest	Rishi Kumar and Veer		

=== Television ===
Year	Title	Role	Notes	Ref.
2007	Get Gorgeous	Himself		
2014	Yeh Hai Aashiqui	Nikhil Bhardwaj	Special appearance	
2024	Indian Police Force	Kabir Malik		

=== Music video appearances ===
Year	Title	Singer	Ref.
2020	"Muskurayega India"	Vishal Mishra	
2020	"Challon Ke Nishaan"	Stebin Ben	
2021	"Thoda Thoda Pyaar"	Stebin Ben	

== Accolades ==
Malhotra has received two Filmfare Awards nominations — Best Male Debut for Student of the Year and Best Actor for Shershaah.

== See also ==
- List of Indian film actors
