= Double Occupancy =

- Theatrical release poster
- Directed by: Aswin Kandasamy
- Written by: Aswin Kandasamy
- Produced by: Khushbu Sundar; Anandita Sundar; A. C. Shanmugam; A. C. S. Arun Kumar
- Starring: Santhosh; Reshma Venkatesh; Samyuktha Viswanathan; Vinoth Kishan
- Cinematography: Santhakumar Chakravarthy
- Edited by: Praveen Antony
- Music by: Sam C. S.
- Production companies: Avni Movies; Benzz Media Pvt Ltd
- Distributed by: Five Star K. Senthil
- Release date: 12 June 2026
- Running time: 132 minutes
- Country: India
- Language: Tamil

Double Occupancy is a 2026 Indian Tamil-language fantasy romantic comedy film directed by Aswin Kandasamy in his debut and produced by Avni Movies and Benzz Media Pvt Ltd. The film stars Santhosh, Reshma Venkatesh, Samyuktha Viswanathan and Vinoth Kishan. It deals with the concept of diurnal gender swap/diurnal metamorphosis, and was released in theatres on 12 June 2026.

== Plot ==
An elderly couple who have long struggled to conceive pray fervently for a child. Their prayers are answered when a divine being tells them that, instead of one child, they will receive "two in one." When the baby is born, the couple realizes the blessing is literal: from 6:00 a.m. to 6:00 p.m., the child exists as a girl, and from 6:00 p.m. to 6:00 a.m., the same body becomes a boy. The two beings only share a heart; their appearances, personalities, memories, emotions, injuries, and experiences remain completely independent and separate. Their body is a vessel that changes according to gender. Neither is aware of what the other does while in control of the body, forcing them to communicate through written notes.

The parents give the child the gender-neutral name Rajini. During the day, Rajini (female) receives a conventional upbringing, attends school and college, and develops a social life. In contrast, Rajini (male), who exists only at night, is homeschooled by his parents, receives only a basic education, and grows up isolated. As they grow, both come to dislike each other, believing the other's existence has deprived them of half of their lives. Their communication gradually evolves to text message conversations.

When Rajini is 23 years old, their parents die in a road accident. Rajini (female), who is present during the day, performs the funeral rites before the evening transformation. When Rajini (male) awakens that evening, he learns of their deaths only after seeing their photograph. Unable to bid farewell to his parents, he develops a deep resentment toward Rajini (female), blaming her for denying him a final goodbye to the only people he had known his entire life.

Following their parents' deaths, the two are forced to live independently. Rajini (female), due to her formal education, joins a biotechnology startup as a researcher, where she meets Karthik. Meanwhile, Rajini (male), lacking formal educational qualifications, takes a job as a bartender, where he befriends Raju, a steel plant owner, and Priya, a rich fashion designer. Rajini (female) falls in love with Karthik, while Rajini (male) develops feelings for Priya. After a series of misunderstandings and chance encounters, Karthik, Priya, and Raju discover Rajini's unique condition. Both Karthik and Priya accept the condition and continue their respective relationships. Raju begins considering Rajini (male) as his son.

After Rajini (female) has sex with Karthik, she gets her period for the first time and remains a woman continuously for the next five days, day and night, preventing Rajini (male) from emerging. After the 5 days, the previously fixed twelve-hour transformation cycle becomes unstable and unpredictable. Instead of changing precisely at 6:00 a.m. and 6:00 p.m., the transformations begin occurring unpredictably whenever their heart rate changes significantly due to emotions. The instability severely disrupts both relationships. As the unstable transformations continue, Rajini (female) and Rajini (male) begin experiencing fragments of each other's emotions for the first time. Their lifelong resentment gradually gives way to empathy and affection.

Due to an unexpected transformation at the startup where Rajini (female) works, security cameras capture the change. The company's founder discovers Rajini's secret and becomes fascinated and determined to study the phenomenon through unauthorized genetic experimentation. When his attempts to persuade Rajini to participate in his research fail, he kidnaps Rajini (female). During the confrontation, Rajini (female) deliberately triggers a transformation and becomes Rajini (male), who overpowers the attackers. In the ensuing fight, however, the founder fatally wounds their shared heart. Rajini (male) defeats and kills the founder but collapses from the injury. Using an exposed electrical wire, he delivers an electric shock directly to his heart and successfully restores its rhythm, though a faint one. At that moment, the transformation occurs once more, and Rajini (female) regains control of the body.

Priya arrives at the scene in time to rescue Rajini (female) and arranges emergency medical treatment with the help of her influential father. Doctors determine that the damaged heart cannot be saved, and Rajini (female) undergoes a heart transplant. Because the original heart was the only organ shared by both personalities, replacing it permanently severs the connection between them. Rajini (male) ceases to exist and never reappears, as it was Rajini (female) who received the new heart.

Rajini's (male) disappearance leaves Priya and Raju devastated. Accepting that Rajini (male) cannot return, Priya encourages Rajini (female) and Karthik to move forward with their lives. Rajini (female) and Karthik eventually marry, while Priya and Raju remain close friends with the couple. Some time later, Rajini (female) gives birth to her first child with Karthik. As Priya and Raju visit the newborn, it is revealed that the child has inherited the same extraordinary condition.

== Cast ==
- Santhosh as the male Rajini
  - Kenneth as young male Rajini
- Reshma Venkatesh as the female Rajini
  - Meher as young female Rajini
- Samyuktha Viswanathan as Priya
- Vinoth Kishan as Karthik
- VTV Ganesh as Raju Bhai
- Bagavathi Perumal as Dr. Rajiv
- Bose Venkat as Arunachalam, Rajini's father
- Vinodhini Vaidyanathan as Valli, Rajini's mother
- Khusbhu Sundar as Dr. Kushbu
- Vichu Vishwanath as Ramalingam
- Manushri as Lakshmi

== Production ==
Double Occupancy is the debut for Santhosh in a leading role. Production began in March 2025, and wrapped in February 2026.

== Music ==
The music was composed by Sam C. S. The audio rights were acquired by Saregama. The first single "Minnal Adikudhadi" was released in late March 2026. The second single "Uyire" was released that May.

Track listing
No.	Title	Lyrics	Singer(s)	Length
1.	"Minnal Adikudhadi"	Swetha Prabakaran	Adithya RK	4:03
2.	"Uyire"	Vidya Damotharan	Adithya RK	3:23
3.	"Vaaramai Oru Velicham"	Kaala	Sam C. S., Kaala	3:55
4.	"Maayoney"	Shalli C	Latha Krishnan	2:38
5.	"Naan Varuven"	Sam C. S.	Kapil Kapilan, Sanjana Kalmanje	3:21
Total length:				17:20

== Release ==
=== Theatrical ===
Double Occupancy was released in theatres on 12 June 2026. The film was distributed by Five Star K. Senthil in Tamil Nadu and Karnataka.

=== Home media ===
The post-theatrical streaming and satellite rights were reportedly acquired by Amazon Prime Video and Zee Tamil.

== Reception ==
Jayabhuvaneshwari B of Cinema Express called Double Occupancy an "imaginative fantasy is filled with clever world-building and charming performances", but felt it was "restrained at times by emotional over-occupancy". Abhinav Subramanian of The Times of India wrote, "Double Occupancy overreaches and wobbles for it, but the idea is fresh for our screens and there is enough wit and craft to make the gamble worth taking". The film was also reviewed by Baradwaj Rangan, Cinema Vikatan and Kalki Online.
