= Megha Burman =

Indian actress

- Born: Calcutta, West Bengal, India
- Occupation: Actress
- Years active: 2003–present

Megha Burman is an Indian actress working in Hindi and Tamil film industry.

== Career ==
She played the role of Razia in Sohan Roy's Dam, which may have been based on the Mullaperiyar Dam dispute between Tamil Nadu and Kerala. The DMK party chief M. Karunanidhi urged the Tamil Nadu chief minister J.Jayalalithaa to ban the movie for "people's safety". A day before its scheduled release on 25 November, the film was banned by the State Government on grounds that its release would disturb relations between Tamil Nadu and Kerala.

She played the lead role in Oru Modhal Oru Kadhal. Her film Ballad of Rustom was a qualifying feature for the Academy Awards in 2014. In 2020, she played the role of Nisha Das in the Hindi language sports drama film Panga.

== Filmography ==
=== Films ===
Year	Title	Role	Language	Refs.
2003	Paap	DCP's daughter	Hindi	
2008	Ankit, Pallavi & Friends	Pallavi	Telugu	
2011	Dam 999	Raziya	English	
2012	Ballad of Rustom		Hindi	
2013	Lattoo		Bengali	
2014	Oru Modhal Oru Kadhal	Anusha	Tamil	
2020	Panga	Nisha Das	Hindi	
2023	Kennedy	Anuradha	Hindi	

=== Television ===
Year	Show	Role	Notes
2013	The Suite Life of Karan & Kabir	Nia	
2016	24	Vaidehi	Season 2
2025	Black Warrant	Seema	Season 1
