= Van Devi Temple, Bihta =

Van Devi Temple
- Maa Van Devi Mandir
- Location within Bihar

Religion
- Affiliation: Hinduism
- Deity: Van Devi

Location
- Location: Bihta, Patna - 801103
- State: Bihar
- Country: India
- Coordinates: 25.537514083406723°N 84.87465263805241°E

Architecture
- Type: Hindu temple

Van Devi Temple, also known as Maa Van Devi Temple, is a Hindu temple near Bihta in Patna district, Bihar, India. The temple is dedicated to Van Devi, who is worshipped at the temple in the form of a sacred pind, a stone-like sacred object.

== History & legend ==
According to local tradition, the shrine is associated with Vindhyavasini Devi of Vindhyachal. A devotee from Raghopur, Vidyanand Mishra, is said to have worshipped at Vindhyachal but found it difficult to travel there in his old age. Local accounts say that he was instructed in a dream to establish a sacred pind near his village, which later became associated with the present shrine.

== Religious practices ==
The temple is said to be at least 400 years old, although the exact date of its establishment is not known. The surrounding area was formerly forested, and the temple remains associated with local beliefs about the forest and the goddess. The temple is visited by devotees from Bihta and nearby areas, particularly during Navratri. According to local belief, the temple is closed after sunset and the priest leaves the premises for the night.

== Location ==
The temple is located in Raghopur Kanchanpur village in Bihta block of Patna district, Bihar. It is situated about 32 km from Patna. The nearest airport is Jay Prakash Narayan Airport in Patna, which is about 30 km from Bihta. Bihta is the nearest railway station.

== In popular culture ==
The temple and its associated local legends gained wider attention in 2026 after reports linked them to the Hindi film The Vvaan: Force of the Forrest. The film's writer, Arunabh Kumar, visited the temple and spoke with local residents and priests while researching the story.
