= Chaari 111 =

2024 Telugu movie

- Theatrical release poster
- Directed by: TG Keerthi Kumar
- Written by: TG Keerthi Kumar
- Produced by: Aditi Soni
- Starring: Vennela Kishore; Murali Sharma; Samyuktha Viswanathan
- Cinematography: Kashish Grover
- Edited by: A. Richard Kevin
- Music by: Simon K. King
- Production company: Barkat Studios
- Release date: 1 March 2024
- Running time: 129 minutes
- Country: India
- Language: Telugu

Chaari 111 is a 2024 Indian Telugu-language action comedy film written and directed by TG Keerthi Kumar. The film stars Vennela Kishore in the titular role. Simon K. King scored the music.

== Cast ==
- Vennela Kishore as Brahmachaari a.k.a. Agent Chaari
- Murali Sharma as Major Prasad Rao, Chief of Rudranetra
- Samyuktha Viswanathan as Agent Esha
- Chaithanya Pasupuleti as Raavan
- Pavani Reddy as Agent Priya
- Satya as Rahul, Rudranetra’s tech-guy
- Thagubothu Ramesh as Bunty, Chaari’s admirer and assistant
- Brahmaji as Srinivas, Business Industrialist
- Rahul Ravindran as the CM GMR
- Subhalekha Sudhakar as the former-CM Vijay Reddy
- Priya Malik as Mahima, Raavan and Priya’s mother
- Goldie Nissy as Madhu, Prasad’s assistant
- Ajit Koshy as Scientist Krishnan
- Prabhakaran Mogan as Agent Beedi Thatha

== Soundtrack ==
The soundtrack was composed by Simon K. King.

Track listing
No.	Title	Lyrics	Singer(s)	Length
1.	"Theme Of Chaari 111"	Ramajogayya Sastry	Sanjeeta Bhattacharya	3:09
2.	"Love Song"	Akshitha	Akshitha	0:57
3.	"Beedi Thatha"	Niranj Suresh	Niranj Suresh	1:38
Total length:				5:44

== Reception ==
A critic from The Times of India wrote that "Chaari 111 attempts to carve a niche within the spy comedy genre, offering a blend of espionage and humour. While it shines in performances and genre fusion, the film's comedic elements require a sharper edge to truly resonate with its audience". Abhilasha Cherukuri of Cinema Express wrote, "The film’s plot has more holes than a slice of cheese, and its treatment is no less odorous. [...] Chaari 111 shifts from comedy to drama to comedy in ways that only seem to reflect poor writing and decision-making." A critic from Telugucinema.com rated the film 2/5 and wrote, "As a concept, “Chaari 111″—in which Vennela Kishore plays a humorous agent—sounds interesting, and at first, it even provides some decent comedy. However, the film eventually falls flat as the story unfolds."
