= Space Gen: Chandrayaan =

Indian Hindi-language series

- Genre: Drama
- Created by: Arunabh Kumar
- Written by: Shubham Sharma; Nitin Tiwari
- Directed by: Anant Singh 'Bhaatu'
- Starring: Nakuul Mehta; Shriya Saran
- Music by: Rohan-Rohan
- Country of origin: India
- Original language: Hindi
- No. of seasons: 1
- No. of episodes: 5

Production
- Executive producer: Vijay Koshy
- Producers: Premsheela Kumar; N. Kumar
- Cinematography: Shreedutta Namjoshi
- Editor: Farooq Hundekar
- Running time: 45–50 minutes
- Production company: The Viral Fever

Original release
- Network: JioHotstar
- Release: 23 January 2026

Space Gen: Chandrayaan is a 2026 Hindi-language Indian television series created by Arunabh Kumar and produced by Premsheela Kumar and N. Kumar under the banner of The Viral Fever. Written by Shubham Sharma and Nitin Tiwari and directed by Anant Singh ‘Bhaatu’, the series stars Nakuul Mehta and Shriya Saran in lead roles.

Based on India’s Chandrayaan lunar exploration programme, the series dramatizes the period between the failure of the Chandrayaan-2 mission in 2019 and the successful soft landing of Chandrayaan-3 near the Moon’s south pole. It premiered on JioHotstar on 23 January 2026. The series received mixed reviews from critics, with praise directed towards its intent, performances, and emotional grounding, while criticism focused on its narrative depth, pacing, and execution.

== Synopsis ==
Space Gen: Chandrayaan dramatizes events surrounding the Indian Space Research Organisation’s (ISRO) lunar exploration programme, focusing on the period between the failure of the Chandrayaan-2 lander in 2019 and the successful soft landing of Chandrayaan-3 near the Moon’s south pole. The series opens with the loss of the Vikram lander during the Chandrayaan-2 mission, depicting the immediate aftermath, including public scrutiny, internal evaluation, and the emotional impact on scientists and officials involved in the programme.

Across its five episodes, the narrative follows a group of ISRO scientists as they address organisational challenges, resource limitations, and the additional disruptions caused by the COVID-19 pandemic. As the team works to redesign and rebuild the lunar lander, the series portrays the process of refining mission protocols, managing setbacks, and maintaining morale, highlighting both the technical demands of space exploration and the human effort behind the mission.

The final episode centres on the critical hours leading up to the Chandrayaan-3 mission’s soft-landing sequence. It depicts the tense descent of the lander and the eventual confirmation of a successful touchdown at Shiv Shakti Point on the Moon’s south pole. The series concludes by underscoring themes of resilience, collective determination, and incremental progress following earlier failure.

== Cast ==
- Nakuul Mehta as Arjun Verma
- Shriya Saran as Yamini Mudaliar
- Prakash Belawadi as Sudarshan Ramaiah
- Danish Sait as Jairam Shetty
- Amruta Khanvilkar as Madhvi
- Gopal Dutt as Rakesh Mohanty
- Meiyang Chang as Rohan Tamang
- Shreya Singh as Shaheen
- Vishwajeet Pratap Yadav as Pramod
- Saurabh Dwivedi as News Anchor
- Krishna Solgama as Lady News Anchor
- Ishita Sharma as Meenal
- Awais Ahmed as Awais Ahmed
- Taba Reema as Tara Wangchu
- Uday Mahesh as Sankaran Nair
- Meenal Kapoor as Ratna Verma
- Pratik Gandhi as Aakash Bhutani

== Episodes ==
No.	Title	Directed by	Written by	Original release date	Length
1	"Finding Vikram"	Anant Singh 'Bhaatu'	Shubham Sharma, Nitin Tiwari	23 January 2026	35 minutes
2	"Man vs Machine"	Anant Singh 'Bhaatu'	Shubham Sharma, Nitin Tiwari	23 January 2026	32 minutes
3	"Science Finds a Way"	Anant Singh 'Bhaatu'	Shubham Sharma, Nitin Tiwari	23 January 2026	27 minutes
4	"Make in India"	Anant Singh 'Bhaatu'	Shubham Sharma, Nitin Tiwari	23 January 2026	27 minutes
5	"Where the Mind is Without Fear"	Anant Singh 'Bhaatu'	Shubham Sharma, Nitin Tiwari	23 January 2026	33 minutes

== Release ==
The series premiered on JioHotstar on 23 January 2026.

== Reception ==
Yatamanyu Narain of News18 rated the series 3.5 out of 5 stars, stating that “Space Gen: Chandrayaan leaves you with a particular kind of uplift: not the loud kind, but the earned kind, built from failure, humiliation, second chances, and stubborn competence.” Similarly, The Times of India critic Archika Khurana also awarded it 3.5 out of 5 stars, writing that “It is a respectful, engaging watch that leaves you not with awe alone, but with renewed appreciation for the people who quietly make history possible.”

Abhishek Srivastava of Moneycontrol gave the series 3 out of 5 stars, observing that “Space Gen: Chandrayaan is neither a perfect series nor a poor one. It succeeds in capturing the spirit of the people who made India proud in space exploration.” Divya Nair of Rediff.com, who rated it 2.5 out of 5 stars, remarked that “TVF deserves credit for breaking its mould of picking and sticking to favourable and comfortable genres. Space Gen could serve as a launch pad for more exciting content to come.” Vinamra Mathur of Firstpost echoed a similar sentiment with a 2.5 star rating, stating that “Space Gen: Chandrayaan could be a leap for TVF... They have always shone in telling stories about the ground realities of the nation. With their new show, they aim for the skies.”

Cinema Express reviewer BH Harsh rated the series 2 out of 5 stars, noting that “Except Prakash Belawadi’s sincere performance, there is very little to root for in TVF’s latest series.” Aishwarya Vasudevan of OTTplay, also giving it 2 out of 5 stars, wrote that “Space Gen: Chandrayaan humanises ISRO’s journey but suffers from a rushed, one-dimensional execution. Despite Nakuul Mehta’s strong acting, the series lacks depth and feels largely forgettable.” Rahul Desai of The Hollywood Reporter India was particularly critical, observing that “The TVF series dramatising ISRO’s landmark lunar mission is steeped in a lack of curiosity, craft and wonder.”

Writing for India Today, Shweta Keshri described the series as uneven, stating, “It’s a decent watch if you’re curious about India’s space journey, but it never fully takes off. TVF shows are known for keeping it real but this time they seem to have missed the mark.” Upma Singh of Navbharat Times rated the series 2 out of 5 stars and wrote that “overall, the series fails to do justice to its impressive subject.” Similarly, Kiran Jain of Amar Ujala also awarded it 2 out of 5 stars, stating that “the story lacks the depth it should have, and in some places, things feel rushed.”

== See also ==
- List of productions by The Viral Fever
