= Malli Modalaindi =

Indian Telugu romantic comedy

- Release poster
- Directed by: TG Keerthi Kumar
- Written by: TG Keerthi Kumar
- Produced by: K. Rajashekhar Reddy
- Starring: Sumanth; Naina Ganguly
- Cinematography: G. R. N. Shiva
- Edited by: Pradeep E. Ragav
- Music by: Anup Rubens
- Production company: Red Cinemas
- Release date: 11 February 2022
- Running time: 126 minutes
- Country: India
- Language: Telugu

Malli Modalaindi (transl. Started once again) is a 2022 Indian Telugu Language romantic comedy film directed by TG Keerthi Kumar and produced by K. Rajashekhar Reddy. The film stars Sumanth and Naina Ganguly in the lead roles. It was edited by Pradeep E Ragav and the soundtrack was composed by Anup Rubens.

It released directly in ZEE5, on 11 February 2022, to negative reviews from the critics.

== Plot ==
Vikram, a self-centred man and chef by profession, has a troublesome marriage with Nisha. He was unable to give time to his wife and cannot bear the torture any longer. Nisha asks for a divorce and is supported by Vikram. After the divorce, Vikram feels attracted to Pavithra, who is Nisha's lawyer. He enrolls the services of Pavithra's new company, Reset, a matrimonial platform for divorcées. Vikram and Pavithra spend time together, slowly falling in love with each other. Pavithra introduces Vikram to her parents, hoping to marry him. But Vikram faints at that moment and is rushed to the hospital.

Vikram still thinks that he is not ready for another marriage, yet. He remembers his marital problems with Nisha, and shares them with Pavithra. Pavithra assures him that she will not rush things with him, and will only get married, when he feels ready. Later, Nisha tells Vikram that she will soon get married. Vikram attends her engagement. Vaishnavi, Vikram's friend, kisses him during the ceremony and tells him that she wants to be with him, which is seen by Pavithra. Vikram soon realizes that Pavithra is the right person for him. However, Vaishnavi, upset with Vikram, reunites with her ex-boyfriend.

Pavithra sends a video clip to Vikram, stating that she is going through a register marriage. Vikram goes to the marriage registry to stop the wedding, however, in a hilarious turn of events, it is revealed that it was just a prank played by Pavithra to test Vikram, to know if he is ready to get married, again. After coming to an understanding between each other, the two get married at the registry and share a happy life together.

== Cast ==
- Sumanth as Vikram
  - Aakash Srinivas as Young Vikram
- Naina Ganguly as Adv. Pavithra (voice-over by Chinmayi)
- Varshini Sounderajan as Nisha
- Posani Krishna Murali as Mr. Kutumbarao
- Pavani Reddy as Vaishali
- Suhasini Maniratnam as Sujatha, Vikram's mother
- Prudhvi Raj as Judge
- Annapurna as Vikram's grandmother
- Vennela Kishore as Kishore
- Manjula Ghattamaneni as therapist
- Thagubothu Ramesh
- Goldie Nissy as Pavithra’s friend

== Release ==
The film was directly released on ZEE5 on 11 February 2022.

== Reception ==
Neeshita Nyayapati of The Times of India gave the film a rating of 2.5/5 and wrote "Malli Modalaindi had the potential to be a poignant, fun tale of a man who has an aversion to marriage but not commitment. Vikram and his squad definitely deserved better".

Sangeetha Devi Dundoo of The Hindu stated "A well-intentioned drama that could have benefitted with some zing in writing".
