= Gram Chikitsalay =

2025 Indian television series

- Promotional release poster
- Genre: Comedy drama
- Written by: Arunabh Kumar; Deepak Kumar Mishra; Shreya Srivastava; Vaibhav Suman
- Directed by: Rahul Pandey
- Starring: Amol Parashar; Anandeshwar Dwivedi; Vinay Pathak
- Music by: Rohit Sharma
- Country of origin: India
- Original language: Hindi
- No. of seasons: 2
- No. of episodes: 10

Production
- Producer: Arunabh Kumar
- Cinematography: Girish Kant
- Editor: Chandrashekhar Prajapati
- Camera setup: Multi-camera
- Running time: 31-40 minutes
- Production company: The Viral Fever

Original release
- Network: Prime Video
- Release: 9 May 2025 – present

Gram Chikitsalay is an Indian Hindi-language comedy drama television series directed by Rahul Pandey and created by Deepak Kumar Mishra and Arunabh Kumar. Produced by under TVF, it stars Amol Parashar, Anandeshwar Dwivedi and Vinay Pathak. The series premiered on 9 May 2025 on Prime Video.

== Synopsis ==
The young, brilliant, and idealistic Dr. Prabhat takes over a neglected Primary Health Centre in a remote village called Bhatkandi in Jharkhand, determined to bring about much-needed change—only to discover that he must first transform himself before he can transform anything else.

== Cast ==
- Amol Parashar as Dr. Prabhat Sinha
- Vinay Pathak as Chetak Kumar
- Anandeshwar Dwivedi as Diwakar Singh "Phutani"
- Akash Makhija as Gobind
- Garima Vikrant Singh as Indu
- Akansha Ranjan Kapoor as Dr. Gargi
- Santoo Kumar as Sudhir
- Kumar Saurabh as Manjay
- Aayush Tiwari as Chanesar
- Amul Mishra as Suraj Singh
- Kartikay Raj as Dhelu

=== Season 2 ===
- Durgesh Kumar as Bhushan Sharma "Banrakas"
- Ashok Pathak as Binod
- Dinesh Lal Yadav as Babu Sahab
- Laxmi Rawat Surana as Adarsh PHC Jury
- Himani sharma as Vandana, wife of Gobind.

== Release ==
The trailer was released on 30 April 2025

The series was made available to stream on prime Video on 9 May 2025.

The series was renewed for a second season which was released on 23 June 2026.

== Reception ==
Abhishek Srivastav writing for The Times of India gave the series 4 out of 5 stars. and said "The series captures, with sharp detail and humour, the everyday workings of the village and its overlap with the under-resourced health facility." Shubhra Gupta of The Indian Express awarded the series 2 1/2 out of 5 stars and said "The TVF stamp is clear, and the mandate appears to be the same -- give the viewers yet another slice of ruralcore where the clash between city and village is laid out in slow-paced easily digestible chunks." Nandini Ramnath of Scroll.in observed that " Gram Chikitsalay is barely engaging, bereft as it is of Panchayat’s strong writing and staging. It isn’t enough to surround the outsider hero with insiders who jabber away in vehemently colloquial Hindi and act out capitalised eccentricity."

Rahul Desai of The Hollywood Reporter India said in his review that "If you reheat a dinner long enough, however, even the original taste begins to fade. Three seasons in, Panchayat itself would finish as the runner-up in a Panchayat-lookalike contest; Gram Chikitsalay is the sort of imitation that would sit in a corner, join the applause, but take the stage only after the contest." Deepa Gahlot of Rediff.com gave 2.5 stars out of 5 and said "Even though this season of Gram Chikitsalay is way short of expectations from a TVF production, Amol Parashar's earnestness makes one care enough for him to see where his journey takes him." Santanu Das of Hindustan Times gave 3 stars out of 5 and said that " Gram Chikitsalay suffers from a case of narrative inertia, where the show thinks through every detail but rarely acts upon it with a stricter gaze."

Shweta Keshri of India Today gave 3.5 stars and said that "the show beautifully captures the challenges and hope. It also highlights the real need for a change in the neglected healthcare sector." Shubham Kulkarni of OTT Play gave 2.5 stars and writes that "The Amol Parashar-starrer is a good idea with a beating heart, but that is not all it takes to build a stellar show. The glue to bind multiple plots is missing in Gram Chikitsalay, and that dilutes the impact of this potent story." Vinamra Mathur of Firstpost rated 3/5 stars and said "Gram Chikitsalay resides on its sharp sense of observation. It spoofs the melodrama of the village life Hindi cinema of the 80s was replete with."

Devesh Sharma of Filmfare rated this show 3/5 stars and said "It’s a worthy watch for fans of rural dramas, but one that leaves you wishing it had taken a few more risks."
