= Hostel Daze =

2019 Indian adult comedy drama TV series

- Official Poster
- Genre: Comedy drama
- Created by: Saurabh Khanna; Abhishek Yadav
- Screenplay by: Saurabh Khanna; Harish Peddinti; Suprith Kundar
- Directed by: Raghav Subbu (S 1); Amir Musanna (S 2); Sangram Naiksatam (S 2); Abhinav Anand (S3-S4); Sachin Negi (S 3)
- Starring: Nikhil Vijay; Ahsaas Channa; Shubham Gaur; Adarsh Gourav; Luv Vispute
- Country of origin: India
- Original language: Hindi
- No. of seasons: 4
- No. of episodes: 21

Production
- Producer: Arunabh Kumar
- Cinematography: Chetan Jagannath Shinde; Ashwin Kadamboor; Bibartan Ghosh; Hari K. Vedantam
- Running time: 30 minute
- Production company: The Viral Fever

Original release
- Release: 13 December 2019 – present

Related
- Engga Hostel

Hostel Daze is an Indian Hindi-language comedy drama television series created by Saurabh Khanna and written by Abhishek Yadav, Suprith Kundar, Harish Peddinti, Talha Siddhiqui. Directed Raghav Subbu, it stars Adarsh Gourav, Luv Vispute, Shubham Gaur, Nikhil Vijay and Ahsaas Channa in lead roles. Hostel Daze premiered on Amazon Prime Video on 13 December 2019. The series contains four seasons, with a total of 21 episodes of approximately 30 minutes each. Season 2 premiered on 23 July 2021, Season 3 premiered on 16 November 2022 and Season 4 premiered on 27 September 2023.

== Premise ==
The series follows four hostel friends in their first year: Jhantoo (Nikhil Vijay), Ankit (Adarsh Gourav), Chirag (Luv), and Jaat (Shubham Gaur). They are new students on campus who become roommates.

== Characters ==
The cast include:

- Nikhil Vijay as Jatin Kishore aka "Jhantoo", who has been in college for a very long time and is currently the General Secretary of Hostel Affairs (G.S.H.A.).
- Shubham Gaur as Rupesh Bhati aka "Jaat", who got admission in college by the large donation from his father
- Adarsh Gourav/Utsav Sarkar as Ankit Pandey, Akanksha's Boyfriend and "DOPA" of the college.
- Luv Vispute as Chirag Bansal, a shy and over-eager kid, who prefers cleanliness in contrast to his roommates.
- Ahsaas Channa as Akanksha Pechkas Thakur, Ankit's girlfriend
- Harsha Chemudu as Ravi Teja
- Ayushi Gupta as Nabomita Bharadwaj aka "Nabo", Ankit's lab partner, Chirag's girlfriend
- Sahil Verma as Rakhi, Jhantoo's sidekick and eventually junior
- Ranjan Raj as Lolly (Season 1)
- Shivankit Singh Parihar as PhD student 4 (Season 1) and as Cricket Coach (Season 2)
- Sameer Saxena as Hostel Manager (Season 1)
- Nidhi Bisht as Teaching Assistant (Season 1)
- Sanat Sawant as Freshie (Season 1)
- Chandan Roy as Santosh, Dhobiwala (Season 2)
- Ashutosh priyadarshi as Campus tea shop owner
- Sugandha Mishra
- Deven Bhojani
- Vedant Sharan as Entrepreneur

== Reception ==
Jessica Xalxo, writing for RollingStone India observed: "Instead of confronting the very real issues that students are faced with, Hostel Daze trivializes them to the point of tradition, normalization and acceptance. And in its portrayal of the truth lies an endorsement that feels both endemic and dangerous, beyond the trappings of the genre."

== Remake ==
Viral Fever remade the series in Tamil as Engga Hostel in January 2023 and in Telugu as Hostel Days in July 2023 which are also available on Amazon Prime Video.
