= Saas Bahu Achaar Pvt. Ltd. =

2022 Indian drama web television series

- Promotional poster
- Genre: Comedy drama
- Written by: Abhishek Srivastava; Swarnadeep Biswas
- Directed by: Apoorv Singh Karki
- Starring: Amruta Subhash; Anup Soni; Yamini Das; Anjana Sukhani; Manu Bisht; Nikhil Chawla; Shreyansh Kaurav
- Music by: Nilotpal Bora
- Country of origin: India
- Original language: Hindi
- No. of seasons: 1
- No. of episodes: 6

Production
- Executive producers: Vijay Koshy; Shreyansh Pandey
- Producer: Arunabh Kumar
- Cinematography: Arjun Kukreti
- Editor: Sumeet Kotian
- Running time: 20–45 minutes
- Production company: The Viral Fever

Original release
- Network: ZEE5
- Release: 8 July 2022 – present

Saas Bahu Achaar Pvt Ltd is an Indian Drama web-series created by Arunabh Kumar and Apoorv Singh Karki under The Viral Fever for ZEE5. Directed by Karki and produced by Kumar, the series features Amruta Subhash, Anup Soni, Yamini Das, Anjana Sukhani, Manu Bisht, Nikhil Chawla, and Shreyansh Kaurav in prominent roles. The series premiered on 8 July 2022.

== Plot ==
Based in the historic lanes of Chandni Chowk, Old Delhi, ‘Saas Bahu Aachar Pvt. Ltd.’ revolves around Suman who constantly struggles to set up an achaar business and kickstart her entrepreneurial journey with a pure-hearted intent to get her kids back from her ex-husband, Dilip. In this struggle, her support system is her ex mother in-law.

== Cast ==
- Amruta Subhash as Suman Shrivastava: Dilip's ex-wife; Juhi and Rishi's mother and Shukla Ji's partner.
- Yamini Das as Dadi: Dilip's mother; Juhi, Rishi, Vivaan's grandmother and Suman's mother-in-law
- Anandeshwar Dwivedi as Shukla Ji: Suman's partner.
- Anup Soni as Dilip Shrivastava: Suman's ex-husband, Manisha's husband and Juhi, Rishi and Vivaan's father
- Anjana Sukhani as Manisha Srivastava: Dilip's second wife, Vivaan's mother and Juhi & Rishu's step-mother.
- Manu Bisht as Juhi: Suman and Dilip's daughter, Rishu's sister and Vivaan's half-sister.
- Nikhil Chawla as Rishi: Suman and Dilip's son, Juhi's brother and Vivaan's half-brother.
- Shreyansh Kaurav as Vivaan: Manisha and Dilip's son, Juhi and Rishu's half-brother.
- Nisha Jindal as Komal.
- Priya Gupta as Sadhna.
- Ankit Motghare as Reporter.
- Salim Siddiqui as Rohan Joshi
