= Stardust Award for Breakthrough Performance – Male =

Film award in India

The Stardust Breakthrough Performance Award (Male) is given as a part of the Stardust Awards, which are held annually to recognise upcoming talent in Bollywood. This award is given to the actor who has made his impact felt that particular year, by his performance thus resulting in a successful breakthrough in his career. Here is a list of the award winners and the films for which they won. The first award in this category was given in 2005. As of 2015, it has been changed to Stardust Award for Breakthrough Supporting Performance - Male.

The winners of this award are:

Year	Actress	Film
2005	Ritesh Deshmukh	Masti
2006	Shiney Ahuja	Hazaaron Khwaishein Aisi
2007	Kunal Kapoor	Rang De Basanti
2008	Shreyas Talpade	Om Shanti Om
2009	Prateik Babbar	Jaane Tu... Ya Jaane Na
2010	Abhimanyu Singh	Gulaal
2011	No Award	No Award
2012	Vidyut Jamwal	Force
2013	Sidharth Malhotra and Varun Dhawan	Student of the Year
2014	No Award	No Award
2015	Sidharth Shukla	Humpty Sharma Ki Dulhania
2017	Ajay Devgn	Shivaay
2018	Arjun Kapoor	Mubarakan
