= The Vvaan: Force of the Forrest =

2026 Indian film by Deepak Kumar Mishra

- Theatrical release poster
- Directed by: Deepak Kumar Mishra
- Written by: Arunabh Kumar
- Dialogues by: Anandeshwar Dwivedi
- Produced by: Ekta Kapoor; Shobha Kapoor; Niraj Kothari; Arunabh Kumar
- Starring: Sidharth Malhotra; Tamannaah Bhatia; Anup Soni; Sunil Grover; Shweta Tiwari; Maniesh Paul
- Cinematography: Manu Anand
- Edited by: Nitin Baid
- Music by: Songs: Tanishk Bagchi; Vishal Mishra; Amit Trivedi; Sam C. S. Yash Narvekar; Raahi; Score: Sandeep Shirodkar
- Production companies: Balaji Motion Pictures; TVF Motion Pictures; 11:11 Productions
- Distributed by: Pen Marudhar
- Release date: 25 September 2026
- Running time: 136 minutes
- Country: India
- Language: Hindi
- Budget: ₹80–150 crore (Note: Quoting The Free Press Journal, "Reports have estimated the production budget at around Rs 80 crore to Rs 100 crore, while some estimates put the overall cost, including production and promotional expenses, at approximately Rs 150 crore."; Cinema Express has reported the budget as ₹80 crore.)
- Box office: ₹75.84 crore

The Vvaan: Force of the Forrest is a 2026 Indian Hindi-language fantasy thriller film directed by Deepak Kumar Mishra and produced by Shobha Kapoor, Ekta Kapoor, Niraj Kothari, and Arunabh Kumar under Balaji Motion Pictures, TVF Motion Pictures and 11:11 Productions. The film stars Sidharth Malhotra in a dual role as Rishi Kumar and Veer, alongside Tamannaah Bhatia, Anup Soni, Sunil Grover, Shweta Tiwari and Maniesh Paul. It is inspired by Van Devi Temple and its folklore. The film was theatrically released on 25 September 2026.

== Plot ==
For centuries, Vvaan Devi has protected a village, where entering the forest after sunset is strictly forbidden. Legend says that anyone who witnesses what happens in the darkness becomes prey to the Goddess’s tiger.

During Chhath Puja, Rishi, his wife Mamta, and their friend VP return to the village. When plans to develop the sacred forest spark a family dispute, Rishi defies tradition by entering it after dark. But when his nephew Phinish and VP venture into the forest to uncover its secrets, chaos engulfs the village, forcing Rishi to risk everything to save them.

== Cast ==
- Sidharth Malhotra in a double role as
  - Rishi Kumar
  - Veer
- Tamannaah Bhatia as Mamta Kumar, Rishi's wife
- Anup Soni as Shashi Kumar
- Shweta Tiwari as Shushila Kumar
- Sulabha Arya as Chachi (Shashi's Neighbour)
- Sunil Grover as Deepak
- Maniesh Paul as Ved Prakash aka VP
- Milind Gunaji as Priest
- Avtar Gill as Sarpanch
- Durgesh Kumar as Patrkaar
- Sundip Ved as King Vikramaditya
- Akshaan Sehrawat as Ricky
- Ajay Raju as Bus Conductor
- Aniket Sanghavi as Brash Man 1

== Production ==
The film was announced in November 2024 under the working title Vvan: Force of the Forrest. The project developed from a creative partnership between Balaji Motion Pictures and The Viral Fever (TVF).

== Music ==
The Vvaan

Soundtrack album by Tanishk Bagchi, Vishal Mishra, Amit Trivedi, Sam C. S., Yash Narvekar and Raahi
- Released: 25 September 2026
- Genre: Feature film soundtrack
- Length: 29:46
- Language: Hindi
- Label: Zee Music Company
External audio
- The Vvaan – Full Album on YouTube
- The Vvaan – Extended Full Album on YouTube

The music of the film was composed by Tanishk Bagchi, Vishal Mishra, Amit Trivedi, Sam C. S., Yash Narvekar and Raahi with lyrics written by Manoj Muntashir, Kumaar, Kaushal Kishore, Shabbir Ahmed, Tanishk Bagchi, Aniket Shukla and The Shloka.

Track listing
No.	Title	Lyrics	Music	Singer(s)	Length
1.	"Samjho Na"	Manoj Muntashir	Tanishk Bagchi	Jubin Nautiyal, Suvarna Tiwari	4:13
2.	"Thummak Thummak"	Shabbir Ahmed, Tanishk Bagchi	Tanishk Bagchi	Dev Negi, Akasa Singh	2:45
3.	"Chhathi Maiya"	Kaushal Kishore	Vishal Mishra	Vishal Mishra	5:02
4.	"Koi Hai"	Kumaar	Amit Trivedi	Arun Kamath, Janvi Jain	3:24
5.	"Chal Bhawani"	Aniket Shukla	Yash Narvekar	Yash Narvekar	3:29
6.	"Namo Namo Shakti"	The Shloka	Sam C. S.	Deepak Blue	3:21
7.	"Aigiri Nandini"	Traditional	Raahi	Devashri Manohar	2:30
8.	"Chhathi Maiya" (Palak Muchhal Version)	Kaushal Kishore	Vishal Mishra	Palak Muchhal	5:02
Total length:					29:46

== Release ==
Initially scheduled for a late 2025 theatrical release date, coinciding with the Hindu festival of Chhath, The Vvan: Force of the Forrest underwent multiple postponements. The release date was postponed to 15 May 2026, and later 28 August 2026. Following these changes, a definite theatrical release date of 25 September 2026. The film is set to stream on Amazon Prime Video from November 6, 2026.

== Reception ==
=== Box office ===
The Vvaan grossed ₹75.4 crore (US$8.1 million) worldwide. It grossed ₹71.76 crore (US$7.7 million) in India and ₹3.64 crore (US$390,000) in overseas market.

On its opening day, the film earned ₹7.25 crore (US$770,000) crore domestically.

=== Critical response ===
On the review aggregator website Rotten Tomatoes, 21% of 19 critics' reviews are positive, with an average rating of 4.6/10.

Chirag Sehgal of News18 gave the film 3 stars out of 5, concluding, "The Vvaan has an interesting idea at its core and deserves credit for attempting to bring Indian folklore and fantasy together. It is entertaining in parts, with smart dialogues, some genuinely funny moments and committed performances from its cast. However, an inconsistent screenplay, forced humour and unnecessary songs prevent it from becoming a consistently engaging experience." Rishabh Suri of Hindustan Times gave the film 2.5 stars out of 5. He had praise for Bhatia, who, "lends the film its emotional core and channels her character's longing to become a mother," Paul's comic timing, dialogues, and Soni, Tiwari and Grover, calling the latter's casting, "a smart casting choice." However, he noted, "choppy editing does little to hold the film together." He also had criticism for including "too many songs", and found Malhotra 'watchable', VFX 'average,' and music 'nothing remarkable.' A critic at Bollywood Hungama gave the film 2 stars out of 5 and concluded, "On the whole, The Vvaan rests on an interesting premise that blends devotion, mythology, horror and humour. However, a messy screenplay, weak villain track, several illogical developments and a haphazard climax severely dent the film's impact."

Saibal Chatterjee of NDTV gave 2/5 stars and wrote "The Vvaan: Force of the Forrest is a film lost in the woods. It never makes its way out." Jaya Dwivedie of India TV gave 2/5 stars and wrote "A scattered screenplay, inconsistent tone, limited character development, weak comedy and a climax that fails to leave the desired impact overshadow the film's better elements." Shubhra Gupta of The Indian Express gave the film a 0.5 star out of 5, and said, "Some films are bad. Some are terrible. And some are pure torture. The Vvaan falls neatly into that third category, in which I struggled to find a single redeeming feature, and failed spectacularly."
