= Param Sundari (film) =

2025 Indian film by Tushar Jalota

- Theatrical release poster
- Directed by: Tushar Jalota
- Written by: Tushar Jalota; Gaurav Mishra; Aarsh Vora
- Produced by: Dinesh Vijan
- Starring: Sidharth Malhotra; Janhvi Kapoor
- Cinematography: Santhana Krishnan Ravichandran
- Edited by: Manish Pradhan
- Music by: Sachin–Jigar
- Production company: Maddock Films
- Distributed by: Pen Marudhar
- Release date: 29 August 2025
- Running time: 136 minutes
- Country: India
- Language: Hindi
- Budget: ₹60 crore
- Box office: est. ₹85.83 crore

Param Sundari is a 2025 Indian Hindi-language romantic comedy film directed by Tushar Jalota and produced by Dinesh Vijan under Maddock Films. The film stars Sidharth Malhotra and Janhvi Kapoor in lead as the titular roles. The story follows Param, a North Indian boy from Delhi, who searches for his soulmate through an AI app, which leads him to Sundari, a South Indian girl from Kerala.

Initially slated to release on 25 July 2025, the film was released on 29 August 2025. It received mixed-to-negative reviews from critics with praise for the soundtrack and cinematography; mixed reviews about performances and chemistry between the lead pair and criticism for the story and screenplay. It also received controversy involving its stereotypical portrayal of Kerala and Malayali people.

== Plot ==
Param is a young man from a wealthy family who enjoys investing his father’s money in new startups. While searching for a unique investment opportunity, he discovers an app called Soulmates, which uses advanced technology to find one’s perfect match. To prove a point to his father, Param tests the app and is matched with Thekkepattu Sundari Damodharan Pillai, a homestay owner in Kerala who runs her ancestral Tharavad (family house) along with her uncle, Bhargavan Nair, a practitioner of Kalaripayattu. As Param and Sundari meet and their worlds collide, their lives begin to intertwine in unexpected ways as they navigate cultural differences and explore the possibility of love.

== Cast ==
- Sidharth Malhotra as Param Sachdev
- Janhvi Kapoor as Thekkepattu "Sundari" Damodharan Pillai
- Sanjay Kapoor as Parmeet Sachdev, Param's father
- Renji Panicker as Bhargavan Nair
- Siddhartha Shankar as Venu Nair
- Manjot Singh as Jaggi
- Abhishek Banerjee as Shekhar
- Inayat Verma as Ammu, Sundari’s sister
- Tanvi Ram as Parvathy

== Production ==
The film was first reported to be in development in November 2024. It was officially announced on 24 December 2024 by Maddock Films. The film's title was inspired from famous song of the same name by A. R. Rahman from Mimi, which also producer by Maddock Films.

=== Filming ===
The Kerala schedule began on 19 January 2025 and wrapped on 18 February 2025.

== Soundtrack ==
Param Sundari

Soundtrack album by Sachin–Jigar
- Released: 25 August 2025
- Recorded: 2024–2025
- Genre: Feature film soundtrack
- Length: 21:33
- Language: Hindi
- Label: Universal Music India

Sachin–Jigar chronology
Maalik (2025)	Param Sundari (2025)	Thamma (2025)

The film's soundtrack is composed by Sachin–Jigar while the lyrics are written by Amitabh Bhattacharya. The audio rights of the film were acquired by Universal Music India. The first single titled "Pardesiya" was released on 30 July 2025. The second single titled "Bheegi Saree" was released on 8 August 2025.

Track listing
No.	Title	Singer(S)	Length
1.	"Pardesiya"	Sonu Nigam, Krishnakali Saha, Sachin–Jigar	3:51
2.	"Bheegi Saree"	Shreya Ghoshal, Adnan Sami, Sachin–Jigar	3:22
3.	"Danger"	Vishal Dadlani, Parvathi Meenakshi, Sachin–Jigar	2:47
4.	"Sunn Mere Yaar Ve"	Aditya Rikhari, Sachin–Jigar	3:12
5.	"Chand Kagaz Ka"	Vishal Mishra, Sachin–Jigar	4:16
6.	"Sundari Ke Pyar Mein"	Sumonto Mukherjee, Sachin–Jigar	4:05
Total length:			21:33

== Marketing ==
The first look of the film was unveiled on 24 December 2024. The film's teaser trailer was released on 29 May 2025. The film's trailer was released on 12 August 2025.

== Release ==
The film was originally set to release on 25 July 2025 however it was postponed to 29 August 2025.

=== Home media ===
The post-theatrical streaming rights of the film were acquired by Amazon Prime Video, while the satellite rights were bagged by Sony Max The film began streaming on Amazon Prime Video from 24 October 2025.

== Reception ==
=== Box office ===
The film grossed ₹10.36 crore worldwide on its opening day.

=== Critical response ===
Param Sundari received mixed to negative reviews from critics. On the review aggregator website Rotten Tomatoes, 7% of 15 critics' reviews are positive, with an average rating of 3.9/10.

Bollywood Hungama rated the film 3.5 stars out of 5 and wrote, "On the whole, PARAM SUNDARI makes for a pleasant Bollywood rom-com. The story may follow a familiar template, yet the treatment ensures a breezy, light-hearted watch that connects well with the youth through its mix of emotions, romance, music, and drama. At the box office, the film is likely to open decently and has the potential for a healthy theatrical run." Yatamanyu Narain of News18 rated the film 3.5 stars out of 5 and wrote "In the end, Param Sundari is a comfort food cinema. Paneer Butter Masala, idli-sambar, choose your metaphor. Familiar, yes, but warm, fragrant, and deeply satisfying. It may not aspire to gourmet innovation, but it fills the heart with the uncomplicated sweetness of first love, and the nostalgia of a genre once adored but now endangered. It leaves you smiling, maybe even believing, however briefly, in the miracle of soulmates, algorithm or no algorithm."

Tanmayi Savadi of Times Now rated the film 3 stars out of 5 and wrote "Param Sundari is a visual and musical treat. Pardesiya is already a chartbuster, and it sounds even better in theatres. Kerala’s beauty is breathtaking and the cinematography is on point. At 2 hours and 16 minutes, Param Sundari is a balanced film. If you’re a fan of rom-coms, without stressing much on its legacy, Param Sundari is a decent one-time watch." Dhaval Roy of The Times Of India rated the film 3 stars out of 5 and wrote "What works in the film's favour are the picturesque Kerala backdrops, tender moments, and Sachin-Jigar's music-particularly Pardesiya, Danger, and Sundari Ke Pyaar Mein. The humour is light in parts, though not every gag works equally well."

Radhika Sharma of NDTV rated the film 3 stars out of 5 and wrote "Though a must-watch for all Sidharth Malhotra and Janhvi Kapoor fans, Param Sundari is not serving anything new in the romantic comedy genre. While it never promised to be a Saiyaara (a film set in the same umbrella genre of romance but not an intense drama), this new film is not as engaging." Vineeta Kumar of India Today rated the film 2.5 stars out of 5 and wrote "Rom-coms are meant to be a guilty pleasure, the kind you sneak back to when you want comfort. 'Param Sundari', unfortunately, is the kind you forget about the moment the lights come back on. If a love story can’t sell love, what exactly is it selling?"

Taher Ahmed of Deccan Herald gave the film 2 out of 5 stars, describing it as "old wine in a new bottle" filled with stereotypes, and added that the film lacked substance and the performances fell flat. Amar Ujala, writing in Hindi, gave the film 2 out of 5 stars and stated that "Param Sundari was good only till the trailer, dull story and Sidharth's fake expressions will give you trouble", while also noting that the film's strength lies in its music. Lachmi Deb Roy of Firstpost rated the film 2 stars out of 5 and wrote "The film has its heart in the right place as it addresses multiple issues especially how today’s generation decides everything on the basis of AI and algorithms and doesn’t listen either to their heart or head. But towards the end the film does get overtly exhausting with its so-called forced cuteness and simplicity." Shubra Gupta of The Indian Express rated the film 1.5 stars out of 5 and wrote "Sidharth Malhotra-Janhvi Kapoor film struggles to find both rom and com", saying there is no sizzle between Sidharth and Janhvi while also mentioning that the writing was bland and full of bumper-sticker lines.

Kartik Bhardwaj of Cinema Express rated the film 1.5 out of 5, writing that "Sidharth Malhotra and Janhvi Kapoor’s rom-com goes south from the get go", calling it an unoriginal and dated idea, and opining that Malhotra and Kapoor lacked good chemistry. Rishabh Suri of Hindustan Times rated the film 0.5 stars out of 5 and wrote "Overall, if rom-coms are meant to sweep you off your feet, Param Sundari barely manages a polite handshake. Sometimes, technology may help you find a soulmate, but no algorithm can save a film that forgets to make you feel." Debanjan Dhar of Outlook India rated the film 0.5 stars out of 5 and wrote, "Sidharth Malhotra And Janhvi Kapoor Are The Year’s Dullest Duo In Kerala-Tourism-Ad Disaster", opining that in the film, the north-south India chasm is called up for silly, flat comedy and that Siddharth and Janhvi shared the most leaden chemistry. Rahul Desai of The Hollywood Reporter India in his review wrote "The culture-clash romcom, starring Sidharth Malhotra and Janhvi Kapoor, has no identity of its own" , opining it to be a soulless and derivate romcom and called the love triangle witless.
