= Cubicles (web series) =

Hindi-language web series

- Genre: Drama
- Written by: Avinash Singh; Vijay Narayan Verma; Gaurav Sharma
- Directed by: Chaitanya Kumbhakonum (Season 1-2,4); Divyanshu Malhotra (Season 3)
- Starring: Abhishek Chauhan; Badri Chavan; Ayushi Gupta
- Country of origin: India
- Original language: Hindi
- No. of seasons: 4

Production
- Producer: Arunabh Kumar

Original release
- Network: YouTube (Season 1); SonyLIV (Season 2-4)
- Release: 10 December 2019-Present

Cubicles is an Indian Hindi-language web series created by The Viral Fever, starring Abhishek Chauhan, Arnav Bhasin, Shivankit Singh Parihar, and Badri Chavan, among others. The show revolves around the relatable story of Piyush's everyday hustles in an IT company, followed by friendships, relationships, keeping up with the work-life balance and at the same time, staying ahead of everyone on the corporate ladder.

Directed by Divyanshu Malhotra, the first season of Cubicles premiered on TVF Play App and YouTube on 10 December 2019, and the second season on Sony LIV on 29 January 2021.

The third season released on 5 January 2024 and the fourth season on 20 December 2024 on Sony LIV.

== Cast ==
- Abhishek Chauhan as Piyush Prajapati
- Badri Chavan as Gautam Batra
- Ayushi Gupta as Sunaina Chauhan
- Nidhi Bisht as Megha Asthana
- Shivankit Parihar as Angad Waghmare
- Sameer Saxena as Mahendra Dhume
- Niketan Sharma as Naveen Shetty
- Ketaki Kulkarni as Neha Kelkar
- Nimit Kapoor as Vikram Malhotra
- Khushbu Baid as Supriya

== Plot ==
Cubicles follows Piyush Prajapati's journey in his first job at Synnotech Innovations, portraying the highs, lows, and the whirlwind of experiences as he navigates work-life balance, friendships, and challenges in the corporate world like every Indian IT employee.

=== Season 1 ===
The 22-year-old techie, Piyush Prajapati, enters the corporate world at Synotech Innovations. As he grapples with the demands of his new job, the season unravels a series of episodes that delve into the daily challenges, friendships, and intricacies of the workplace. From navigating office politics to forging bonds with colleagues-turned-friends, Piyush's journey unfolds, showcasing the highs, lows, and humorous moments within the IT company's cubicles.

=== Season 2 ===
Piyush's journey continues amidst the challenges and evolution within Synotech Innovations. From battling monotony and seeking change to confronting critical decisions between job opportunities, the complexities of workplace dynamics are further explored. Piyush wrestles with personal growth, balancing loyalty to his current workplace against the allure of new opportunities, while maneuvering through friendships, unexpected situations, and the ever-changing landscape of corporate life.

=== Season 3 ===
After hustling to strive in the corporate world, Piyush is all set to take on new challenges as the Team Lead. Enthusiastic about this opportunity, Piyush constantly struggles between his boss's expectations and the chaos that unfolds behind the cubicles with his team - or rather, his best friends.

=== Season 4 ===
Piyush has grown into a more confident and capable team lead, handling challenges with greater ease than before. The company, Synotech, is being acquired by PIC, leading to uncertainty among employees, some of whom begin applying for jobs elsewhere. Piyush and his team have their first interaction with the tough yet charismatic Tester, Colonel Dhwani, with whom Piyush gradually forms a connection. Amidst office dynamics, old tensions resurface, resulting in small quarrels within the team. In the season finale, Piyush receives an onsite offer for a position in the US. However, valuing his relationships with his friends and team, he decides to recommend his friend Kalpesh for the opportunity instead of accepting it himself, showcasing his loyalty to those around him.

== Series overview ==
Season	Episodes	Originally released		
Season	Episodes	First released	Last released	Network
1	5	December 10, 2019	January 7, 2020	YouTube
2	5	January 7, 2022		Sony LIV
3	5	January 5, 2024		Sony LIV
4	5	December 20, 2024		Sony LIV

== Episodes ==
=== Season 1 (2019) ===
No. overall	Episode	Title	Directed by	Written by	Date of Broadcast
1	1	"Access Denied"	Chaitanya Kumbhakonum	Amit Golani, Avinash Singh, Vijay Narayan Verma	10 December 2019
Piyush is super excited for his first day at Synnotech Technologies. He believes that in order to ensure that this new chapter in his life is a memorable one, it is imperative to have a great first day. However, he finds out that it might not be in his control.
2	2	"CTC"	Chaitanya Kumbhakonum	Amit Golani, Avinash Singh, Vijay Narayan Verma	17 December 2019
The memory of what you did with your first official salary is something most, if not all, remember. Piyush explains it to Kalpesh, it's like losing your financial virginity so it has to be special. He has his eyes set on a special treat for himself. However, the best-laid plans often go awry.
3	3	"Stand By"	Chaitanya Kumbhakonum	Amit Golani, Avinash Singh, Vijay Narayan Verma	24 December 2019
Nowadays, people may forget their own birthdays and anniversaries but a long weekend is something everyone has marked on their calendars right at the start of the year. Some have preset plans while others try to desperately figure something out at the last minute. Look at how Piyush plans for his perfect long weekend and what he actually ends up doing.
4	4	"Reconfiguration"	Chaitanya Kumbhakonum	Amit Golani, Avinash Singh, Vijay Narayan Verma	31 December 2019
In offices, resources from teams are often exchanged on a temporary basis depending on project requirements. In one such transfer, Piyush is made to join a team on a different floor for a month.
5	5	"System Down"	Chaitanya Kumbhakonum	Amit Golani, Avinash Singh, Vijay Narayan Verma	7 January 2020
At the office, the internet goes down for the entire floor because of some construction work outside accidentally cutting off their fiber cable. Without the internet everything is at a standstill so the entire floor tries to pass time by playing games like dumb charades and Taboo etc. revealing some things about each person which otherwise would never be shared.

=== Season 2 (2022) ===
No. overall	Episode	Title	Directed by	Written by	Date of Broadcast
6	1	"Monday Blues"	Chaitanya Kumbhakonum	Arunabh Kumar, Amit Golani, Avinash Singh, Vijay Verma, Siddhartha Tiwari	7 January 2022
Things are not so great with Piyush at Synnotech. Boredom, mundanity and Monday blues weigh him down. As the day goes by, Piyush sees it as an opportunity to change his status quo.
7	2	"Code Phat Gaya"	Chaitanya Kumbhakonum	Arunabh Kumar, Amit Golani, Avinash Singh, Vijay Verma, Siddhartha Tiwari	7 January 2022
A distracted and insecure Piyush manages to goof up on an important project deliverable. In the process of fixing the code, Piyush figures that he needs to fix the code of his life.
8	3	"The Bell Curve"	Chaitanya Kumbhakonum	Arunabh Kumar, Amit Golani, Avinash Singh, Vijay Verma, Siddhartha Tiwari	7 January 2022
It is the day of Appraisal in the office but Piyush has bigger fish to fry, a do or die situation and worst of all Piyush needs to convince Angad to help him out.
9	4	"The Pink Slip"	Chaitanya Kumbhakonum	Arunabh Kumar, Amit Golani, Avinash Singh, Vijay Verma, Siddhartha Tiwari	7 January 2022
It's the D-Day as mass lay-offs are happening at Synnotech. One of the not-so-favorite employees, RDX has to go, but Piyush has a surprise planned for him.
10	5	"From Cubicle To Cabin"	Chaitanya Kumbhakonum	Arunabh Kumar, Amit Golani, Avinash Singh, Vijay Verma, Siddhartha Tiwari	7 January 2022
Piyush has an interview lined up with an IT giant that is offering a huge pay jump. However, back at Synnotech, he is offered a nice promotion. Piyush has to pick one.

=== Season 3 (2024) ===
No. overall	Episode	Title	Directed by	Written by	Date of Broadcast
11	1	"System Upgrade"	Divyanshu Malhotra	Avinash Singh, Vijay Narayan Verma, Gaurav Sharma	5 January 2024
Piyush has been promoted to become a team lead and he is blessed to have his friends by his side. What’s even better is that in front of his boss - Vikram, the client - Jefferson - expresses confidence in Piyush. However, as he tries to find his place as a team lead, he realizes that he was excited for the change but not prepared for the challenges.
12	2	"Insert (New Value)"	Divyanshu Malhotra	Avinash Singh, Vijay Narayan Verma, Gaurav Sharma	5 January 2024
After the initial debacle, Piyush makes a bold decision to hire a new resource in his team. After suffering a frustrating ordeal while interviewing a bunch of candidates, Piyush finally succeeds in finding the right fit. However, Piyush gets pushback from his team and it makes him question whether he made the right decision or not.
13	3	"Machine Learning"	Divyanshu Malhotra	Avinash Singh, Vijay Narayan Verma, Gaurav Sharma	5 January 2024
Piyush gets a reality check upon receiving negative feedback from his team, and he decides on an aggressive approach that succeeds in the desired outcome but ends up sabotaging his relationship with his team. He tries to repair it with a team dinner but instead, everyone shows up at Khyati’s bash. Then the upset Piyush goes to his old friend Kalpesh for a heart-to-heart talk over drinks.
14	4	"Compilation Error"	Divyanshu Malhotra	Avinash Singh, Vijay Narayan Verma, Gaurav Sharma	5 January 2024
Piyush needs to mend his relationship with his team. Meanwhile, the pressure of upcoming deliverables further complicates the situation. What follows is a shocking revelation: one of his team members has been moonlighting for another team during the time allocated for their project. Adding to that, his most trusted mates, Gautam and Gambhir, don't deliver on their modules. After a major debacle in the deliverables, Piyush rises to the occasion and takes a bullet for the team.
15	5	"If/Else"	Divyanshu Malhotra	Avinash Singh, Vijay Narayan Verma, Gaurav Sharma	5 January 2024
Just when Piyush has been able to win back the confidence of his team, he faces the hardest challenge as a team lead. He has to fire one of his teammates. To make matters worse, he has to come to a decision during the weekend trip with the team.

=== Season 4 (2024) ===
No. overall	Episode	Title	Directed by	Written by	Date of Broadcast
16	1	"99.9%"	Chaitanya Kumbhakonum	Avinash Singh, Vijay Verma, Adarsh Jaunpuri, Chetan Dange, and Anurag Shukla	20 December 2024
-
17	2	"Compliance"	Chaitanya Kumbhakonum	Avinash Singh, Vijay Verma, Adarsh Jaunpuri, Chetan Dange, and Anurag Shukla	20 December 2024
-
18	3	"Firewall"	Chaitanya Kumbhakonum	Avinash Singh, Vijay Verma, Adarsh Jaunpuri, Chetan Dange, and Anurag Shukla	20 December 2024
-
19	4	"Breach"	Chaitanya Kumbhakonum	Avinash Singh, Vijay Verma, Adarsh Jaunpuri, Chetan Dange, and Anurag Shukla	20 December 2024
-
20	5	"Restart"	Chaitanya Kumbhakonum	Avinash Singh, Vijay Verma, Adarsh Jaunpuri, Chetan Dange, and Anurag Shukla	20 December 2024
-

== Soundtrack ==
=== Season 1 ===
No.	Title	Lyrics	Singer(s)	Length
1.	"Mann Mein Shor"	-	Karthik Rao, Noxious D	1:36
2.	"Socha Na Tha"	-	Karthik Rao, Shilpa Surroch	2:58
3.	"Pal Wahi Hai"	-	Karthik Rao, Noxious D	4:32
4.	"How Do You Know"	-	Karthik Rao	1:25
5.	"Main Kaun Hoon"	-	Karthik Rao	2:44
6.	"Murshid"	-	Karthik Rao	2:44
Total length:				16:01

=== Season 2 ===
No.	Title	Lyrics	Singer(s)	Length
1.	"Kahin Thor Dikhe Na"	-	Anurag Saikia, Varun Jain	4:08
2.	"Roothi Parchaiyaan"	-	Anurag Saikia, Vivek Hariharan	3:01
3.	"Eco"	-	Anurag Saikia	1:47
4.	"CMC"	-	Anurag Saikia	1:39
5.	"Saturday"	-	Anurag Saikia	1:57
6.	"A New Day"	-	Anurag Saikia	1:27
7.	"Its a Match"	-	Anurag Saikia	1:36
8.	"Hope"	-	Anurag Saikia	1:16
9.	"RDX Was Here"	-	Anurag Saikia	1:25
10.	"Greetings from Goa"	-	Anurag Saikia	1:31
11.	"Cabin vs Cubicle"	-	Anurag Saikia	1:55
12.	"Resignation Letter"	-	Anurag Saikia	2:05
13.	"Reflection"	-	Anurag Saikia	1:44
Total length:				25:31

=== Season 3 ===
No.	Title	Lyrics	Singer(s)	Length
1.	"Daayein Baayein"	-	Vivek Hariharan, Arabinda Neog, Dipakshi Kalita, Divyanshu Malhotra	2:59
2.	"Chalo Chalein"	-	Ankur Jyoti, Arabinda Neog, Bhargav Kateliya	2:25
Total length:				5:24

== Reception ==
=== Season 1 ===
Film Companion wrote "This whole series is trying to put a gilded, almost floral filter on the corporate space, trying to show how people seek value from their work. But this value is not just satisfaction at the end of the day i.e. your job as your vocational soul-mate."

=== Season 2 ===
Times of India wrote "Director & his team of writers successfully portray the little moments in the life of a corporate employee, from the Monday blues to bell curve gyaan on appraisal days to the pink slip, through the eyes of the protagonist." reviews are positive, with an average critics rating of 3.0/5.

=== Season 3 ===
Times of India wrote "With its relatable humor, endearing characters, and heartwarming moments, 'Cubicles 3' offers a welcome escape from the mundane."

=== Season 4 ===
Times of India wrote "Cubicles S4 Introduces fresh conflicts and characters, these elements often feel underdeveloped. Issues are resolved too quickly, robbing them of emotional weight and leaving the narrative feeling convenient and stagnant compared to earlier seasons. This lack of progression prevents the show from reaching the dramatic heights it aspires to."

Ananda Bazar Patrika wrote "If you've ever worked in an office environment, this series will speak to you on a personal level. It’s an honest and refreshing portrayal of workplace dynamics.."

Times Now News wrote "Cubicles 4 is like a perfectly brewed cup of chai during a work break. It is comforting, refreshing, and just what you need to get through the chaos of life. Whether you’ve been in the corporate world or just love a good laugh with relatable characters, this season will keep you hooked."

== See also ==
- List of productions by The Viral Fever
