= Arunabh Kumar =

Indian web series director (born 1982)

Arunabh Kumar (born 26 November 1982) is an Indian entrepreneur, producer, director, screenwriter, and an actor. He is the founder of streaming platform, The Viral Fever (TVF). His shows are often characterized by parody, lightheartedness, youth oriented, and competitive exams in India.

== Early life and career ==
Arunabh Kumar was brought up in Muzaffarpur in Bihar. After completing his B.Tech. in Electrical Engineering from IIT Kharagpur, he joined Shah Rukh Khan's production house Red Chillies Entertainment as an assistant's position under Farah Khan. He was the assistant director for the movie Om Shanti Om.

MTV rejected his creation Engineer's Diary which led to the launching of The Viral Fever.

== Personal life ==
Arunabh Kumar was born on 26 November 1982 in Muzaffarpur, Bihar, India. He completed a Bachelor of Technology degree in electrical engineering from the Indian Institute of Technology Kharagpur. In May 2022, Kumar married his long-time partner, Shruti Ranjan, following a relationship of approximately ten years.

Kumar has been featured in business and media listings, including Fortune India's “40 Under 40” list in 2015 and 2016.

In 2017, multiple allegations of sexual harassment were made against Kumar. A first information report (FIR) was filed in Mumbai, following which Kumar stepped down from his executive role at TVF and was later granted bail. In December 2022, a Mumbai court acquitted Kumar of all charges, citing insufficient evidence and delay in the filing of the complaint.

== Sexual misconduct allegations ==
In March 2017, Kumar was accused of sexual harassment in a Medium post by someone using the pseudonym "Indian Fowler". In the post titled "The Indian Uber — That is TVF", she wrote that she was propositioned and sexually harassed by Kumar on multiple occasions and that it had become "routine". After the anonymous blog post, nine more women came forward and made allegations of sexual misconduct against Kumar. After almost three days, there were varying claims of 6 or 50 additional women who accused him of sexual harassment.

On 29 March 2017, Kumar was booked for molestation after a woman filed a police complaint in Mumbai. Following day, a second FIR was filed against him on charges of sexual harassment. The first complainant was a 26-year-old woman who worked for a production house and was also a writer. The incident, she alleged, took place at TVF's office in May 2016, when she interacted with Kumar over some project. TVF denied all the allegations and said that they would "leave no stone unturned to find the author of the article and bring them to severe justice for making such false allegations.".

Following the allegations, Kumar was arrested on 22 April 2017 but was released on bail the same day after paying a bond of Rs. 10,000. On 16 June 2017, Kumar who was accused in multiple sexual harassment cases, stepped down as TVF CEO and gave the charge to Dhawal Gusain.

After a hiatus of 3 years, Kumar rejoined TVF (The Viral Fever) as a mentor. On 28 December 2022, Mumbai court acquitted Kumar of all the charges. This was 5 years after he faced charges for sexual misconduct. The court said that the case, which had been filed based on the blog post, was filed three years after the alleged incidents and this was an "unexplained and unreasonable" delay. The court determined that the case did not have "concrete evidence" and was not proven beyond a reasonable doubt, due to the fact that it could have been filed due to a business rivalry since all witnesses worked in the same industry.

== Filmography ==
=== Films ===
Year	Title	Role	Note(s)
2007	Om Shanti Om	Transgender auditioning for Shantipriya's role	Uncredited; also assistant director
2020	Such is Life	—N/a	Producer only; Short film
2022	Chhath Mahaparv	—N/a	Producer only; Short film
2024	Powder	—N/a	Producer only; Kannada film
2026	The Vvaan: Force of the Forrest	—N/a	Writer and Producer

=== Television ===
Year	Title	Creator	Director	Writer	Producer	Note(s)
2014-2023	Permanent Roommates	Yes			Yes	
2015-2022	TVF Pitchers	Yes	Yes	Yes	Yes	Also portrayed Yogendra Kumar "Yogi" Pandey
2015	Barely Speaking with Arnub		Yes			
2016	F.A.T.H.E.R.S				Yes	
2016-2023	Humorously Yours			Yes	Yes	
2016-2022	TVF Tripling				Yes	
2016-present	The Aam Aadmi Family	Yes				
2017-present	TSP's Rabish ki Report				Yes	
2017	Bisht, Please!				Yes	
2017	Office v Office				Yes	
2018-2022	Girls Hostel				Yes	
2018-2021	Engineering Girls				Yes	
2018-present	Flames				Yes	
2018-2024	Yeh Meri Family				Yes	
2018-2023	College Romance				Yes	
2019-present	Cubicles				Yes	
2019-present	ImMATURE				Yes	
2019-present	Kota Factory	Yes		Yes	Yes	
2019-present	Gullak				Yes	
2019-2023	Hostel Daze				Yes	
2020	CommitMental				Yes	Telugu language show
2020-present	Panchayat	Yes			Yes	
2021-present	Aspirants	Yes			Yes	
2021	The Interns				Yes	
2022	NCR Days				Yes	
2022	Bade Chote Jasoos				Yes	
2022	Sixerr	Yes			Yes	
2022	Bachelors vs the World				Yes	
2022	Sisters				Yes	
2022	Sonu Beauty Parlour				Yes	
2022	Baap Beta Aur Office				Yes	
2022	Dadugiri				Yes	
2022	Saas Bahu Achaar Pvt. Ltd.	Yes			Yes	
2022	The Winning Secrets				Yes	
2022	Who's your Gynac				Yes	
2023	Half CA	Yes		Yes	Yes	
2023	Kaalkoot	Yes		Yes		
2023	SK Sir ki Class				Yes	
2023	Angrezi Mat Jhad				Yes	
2023	Engga Hostel				Yes	Tamil language show
2023	Arranged Couple				Yes	
2023	The Talent Manager				Yes	
2023	Hostel Days				Yes	Telugu language show
2023	Sandeep Bhaiya				Yes	
2023	Builders				Yes	
2023	Sapne vs Everyone				Yes	
2023	Mom @ Work				Yes	
2024	Very Parivarik	Yes			Yes	
2024	Sisterhood				Yes	
2024	Industry				Yes	
2025	Gram Chikitsalay	Yes			Yes	
2026	Space Gen: Chandrayaan	Yes				

== Awards and achievements ==
He was included in the list of The Economic Times 40 under Forty list for 2016, Fortune Top 40 under 40 list for 2015, GQ's List of Most Influential Young Indians for 2015 and 2016, "Entrepreneur" List of 10 Geniuses Redefining Creativity of 2016. He was also awarded Man's World - Men of the Year in 2014, and AFAQs- "Newsmaker of the Year" in 2014.
