= Engga Hostel =

- Release poster
- Genre: Comedy-drama
- Directed by: Sathish Chandrasekaran
- Starring: Sacchin Nachiappan; Avinaash Ramesh; Saranya Ravichandran; Samyuktha Viswanathan; Goutham Raj; Dravid Selvam; Sreelal; Chu Khoy Sheng; Vidur; Poojitha Selvam
- Country of origin: India
- Original language: Tamil
- No. of seasons: 1
- No. of episodes: 5

Production
- Producer: Arunabh Kumar
- Cinematography: Balaji K Raja
- Running time: 30–35 minutes
- Production company: The Viral Fever

Original release
- Network: Amazon Prime Video
- Release: 27 January 2023

Related
- Hostel Daze

Engga Hostel (transl. Our Hostel) is a 2023 Indian Tamil-language comedy drama television series, which is an official remake of the Hindi-language series Hostel Daze. The series was directed by Sathish Chandrasekaran for Amazon Prime Video under the banner of The Viral Fever.

== Cast ==
- Sacchin Nachiappan as Ajay
- Avinaash Ramesh as Cithappu
- Samyuktha Viswanathan as Ahaana
- Saranya Ravichandran as Rajathilagam
- Goutham Raj as Senthil
- Dravid Selvam as Jaya Veera Paandian
- Sreelal as Jana
- Chu Khoy Sheng as Chang
- Abinash as Ramesh
- Idhaya as Suresh
- Seshu as Janitor
- Muruganatham as Boys Hostel Warden
- Vidur as Yuvaraj
- Jayakumar as Moorthy Sababathy
- Sharmila as Sumathy (Girls Hostel Warden)
- Swetha Kumara Ghuru as Aparna
- Arulmitha as Ranjani
- Poojitha Selvam as Revathi

=== Guest appearance ===
- Vaiyapuri as Security guard
- Rama

== Episodes ==
=== Season 1 ===
Series	Episodes	Originally released
1	5	26 January 2023

No. overall	No. in season	Title	Directed by	Original release date
1	1	"Rough Beginnings"	Sathish Chandrasekaran	26 January 2023
2	2	"Identity ‘Cry’sis"	Sathish Chandrasekaran	26 January 2023
3	3	"Kadhal Complications"	Sathish Chandrasekaran	26 January 2023
4	4	"Make a Wish"	Sathish Chandrasekaran	26 January 2023
5	5	"Final Exams"	Sathish Chandrasekaran	26 January 2023
