= 2020 Filmfare OTT Awards =

Annual OTT awards in India

- Awarded for: Excellence in OTT content
- Date: 19 December 2020
- Venue: Mumbai
- Country: India
- Presented by: Filmfare

Highlights
- Most awards: Paatal Lok & The Family Man (5)
- Most nominations: Paatal Lok (11)
- Best Drama Series: Paatal Lok
- Best Comedy Series: Panchayat
- Best Film - Web Originals: Raat Akeli Hai
- Best Non - Fiction Original (Series): Times of Music
- Best Series (Critics): The Family Man
- Website: 2020 Filmfare OTT Awards

2020 Filmfare OTT Awards, the first edition of OTT awards were held on 19 December 2020 in Mumbai and it included the films and web series released between August 1, 2019 and July 31, 2020. These awards honour artistic and technical excellence in original programming on over-the-top streaming media in Hindi-language. Nominations were announced by Filmfare on 16 December 2020.

Paatal Lok led the ceremony with 11 nominations, followed by Breathe: Into the Shadows and Special Ops with 8 nominations each, and Aarya, Panchayat and The Family Man with 7 nominations each.

Paatal Lok and The Family Man won 5 awards each, with the former winning Best Drama Series, Best Director in a Drama Series (for Avinash Arun and Prosit Roy) and Best Actor in a Drama Series (for Jaideep Ahlawat), and the latter winning Best Series (Critics), Best Director in a Series (Critics) (for Raj & DK), Best Actor in a Drama Series (Critics) (for Manoj Bajpayee) and Best Actress in a Drama Series (Critics) (for Priyamani), thus becoming the most-awarded series at the ceremony.

== Winners and nominees ==
Sources: nominations

Sources: winners

- Winners denoted in **boldface**

=== Popular awards ===
Drama Series
Best Series	Best Director
**Paatal Lok –** Amazon Prime Video; Aarya – Hotstar; Asur – Voot; Special OPS – Hotstar; The Family Man – Amazon Prime Video	**Avinash Arun and Prosit Roy – Paatal Lok**; Neeraj Pandey and Shivam Nair – Special OPS; Oni Sen – Asur; Raj & DK – The Family Man
Best Actor (Male)	Best Actor (Female)
**Jaideep Ahlawat – Paatal Lok as Haathiram Chaudhary**; Abhishek Bachchan – Breathe: Into the Shadows as Dr. Avinash Sabharwal/J; Arshad Warsi – Asur as Dhananjay Rajput; Kay Kay Menon – Special OPS as Himmat Singh; Manoj Bajpayee – The Family Man as Srikant Tiwari	**Sushmita Sen – Aarya as Aarya Sareen**; Jennifer Winget – Code M as Monica Mehra; Kirti Kulhari – Four More Shots Please! (Season 2) as Anjana Menon; Nithya Menen – Breathe: Into the Shadows as Abha Sabharwal; Priyamani – The Family Man as Suchitra Iyer Tiwari
Best Supporting Actor (Male)	Best Supporting Actor (Female)
**Amit Sadh – Breathe: Into the Shadows as Kabir Sawant**; Abhishek Banerjee – Paatal Lok as Vishal "Hathoda" Tyagi; Ishwak Singh – Paatal Lok as Imran Ansari; Pankaj Tripathi – Sacred Games (Season 2) as Khanna Guruji; Sharib Hashmi – Asur as Lolark Dubey	**Divya Dutta – Special OPS as Sadiya Qureshi**; Gul Panag – Paatal Lok as Renu Chaudhary; Maya Sarao – Aarya as Maya; Merambam Ronaldo Singh – Paatal Lok as Mary Lyngdoh; Swastika Mukherjee – Paatal Lok as Dolly Mehra
Comedy Series
Best Series
**Panchayat –** Amazon Prime Video; Amit Tandon: Family Tandoncies – Netflix; Little Things (Season 3) – Netflix; Rohan Joshi: Wake and Bake – Amazon Prime Video
Best Actor (Male)	Best Actor (Female)
**Jitendra Kumar – Panchayat as Abhishek Tripathi**; Dhruv Sehgal – Little Things (Season 3) as Dhruv Vats; Gulshan Devaiah – Afsos as Nakul; Mukul Chadda – The Office as Jagdeep Chadda; Ranvir Shorey – Metro Park as Kalpesh Patel	**Mithila Palkar – Little Things (Season 3) as Kavya Kulkarni**; Maanvi Gagroo – Four More Shots Please! (Season 2) as Siddhi Patel; Purbi Joshi – Metro Park as Payal Patel; Rinku Rajguru – Hundred as Netra Patil; Sumukhi Suresh – Pushpavalli (Season 2) as Pushpavalli Parsuraman
Best Supporting Actor (Male)	Best Supporting Actor (Female)
**Raghubir Yadav – Panchayat as Brij Bhushan Dubey**; Hrishikesh Joshi – Breathe: Into the Shadows as Prakash Kamble; Rahul Dev – Who's Your Daddy as Prem Singh; Shrikant Sharma – Breathe: Into the Shadows as Jai Prakash	**Neena Gupta – Panchayat as Manju Devi**; Ahsaas Channa – Hostel Daze as Akanksha; Samriddhi Dewan – The Office as Pammi Goel; Trupti Khamkar – Hum Tum Aur Them as Gauri
Web Originals
Best Film
**Raat Akeli Hai –** Netflix; Barot House – ZEE5; Bulbbul – Netflix; Chintu Ka Birthday – ZEE5; Choked – Netflix
Best Actor (Male)	Best Actor (Female)
**Nawazuddin Siddiqui – Raat Akeli Hai as Inspector Jatil Yadav**; Amit Sadh – Barot House as Amit Barot; Aparshakti Khurana – Kanpuriye as Jaitun Mishra; Manoj Bajpayee – Bhonsle as Ganpath Bhonsle; Vinay Pathak – Chintu Ka Birthday as Madan Tiwary	**Triptii Dimri – Bulbbul as Bulbbul**; Kiara Advani – Guilty as Nanki Dutta; Radhika Apte – Raat Akeli Hai as Radha; Saiyami Kher – Choked as Sarita Patil; Sayani Gupta – Posham Pa as Regha Sathe
Best Supporting Actor (Male)	Best Supporting Actor (Female)
**Rahul Bose – Bulbbul as Indranil/Mahendra**; Aditya Srivastava – Raat Akeli Hai as Munna Raja; Gurfateh Pirzada – Guilty as Vijay “VJ” Pratap Singh; Roshan Mathew – Choked as Sushant Pillai; Vijay Raaz – Kanpuriye as Lampat Harami	**Seema Pahwa – Chintu Ka Birthday as Nani**; Akansha Ranjan – Guilty as Tanu Kumar; Heeba Shah – Ghost Stories as Shanti; Shivani Raghuvanshi – Raat Akeli Hai as Vasudha Singh; Surekha Sikri – Ghost Stories as Mrs. Malik
Writing Awards
Best Original Story (Series)	Best Unscripted Original (Series)
**Sudip Sharma, Sagar Haveli, Hardik Mehta and Gunjit Chopra – Paatal Lok**; Chandan Kumar – Panchayat; Gaurav Shukla – Asur; Mayank Sharma, Vikram Tuli, Bhavani Iyer and Arshad Sayed – Breathe: Into the Shadows; Raj & DK and Suman Kumar – The Family Man	**Times of Music – MX Player**; Amit Tandon: Family Tandoncies – Netflix; Go Fun Yourself – Voot; Kenny Sebastian: The Most Interesting Person In The Room – Netflix; One Mic Stand – Amazon Prime Video
Best Screenplay	Best Dialogues
**Sudip Sharma, Sagar Haveli, Hardik Mehta and Gunjit Chopra – Paatal Lok**; Chandan Kumar – Panchayat; Mayank Sharma, Vikram Tuli, Bhavani Iyer – Breathe: Into the Shadows; Raj & DK and Suman Kumar – The Family Man; Trishant Srivastava, Nishank Verma – Jamtara – Sabka Number Ayega	'Raj & DK'**, Sumit Arora and Suman Kumar – The Family Man**; Chandan Kumar – Panchayat; Mayank Sharma, Vikram Tuli, Bhavani Iyer and Arshad Sayed – Breathe: Into the Shadows; Sudip Sharma, Sagar Haveli, Hardik Mehta and Gunjit Chopra – Paatal Lok; Trishant Srivastava, Nishank Verma – Jamtara – Sabka Number Ayega
Music Awards
Best Background Music (Series)	Best Original Soundtrack (Series)
**Alokananda Dasgupta – Sacred Games (Season 2)**; Advait Nemlekar – Special OPS; Kartik Shah – State of Siege: 26/11; Pritam Das – Bard of Blood; Vishal Khurana – Aarya	**Advait Nemlekar – Special OPS**; Kingshuk Chakravarty for "Kuch Iss Tarah" – Hum Tum and Them; Vishal Khurana – Aarya; Vishal Mishra for "Teri Hogiyaan" – Broken But Beautiful

=== Critics' Choice Awards ===
Best Series	Best Director (Series)
**The Family Man – Amazon Prime Video**	**Raj & DK – The Family Man**
Best Actor (Male): Drama	Best Actor (Female): Drama
**Manoj Bajpayee – The Family Man as Srikant Tiwari**	**Priyamani – The Family Man as Suchitra Iyer Tiwari**
Best Actor (Male): Comedy	Best Actor (Female): Comedy
**Dhruv Sehgal – Little Things (Season 3) as Dhruv Vats**	**Sumukhi Suresh – Pushpavalli (Season 2) as Pushpavalli Parasuraman**

=== Technical awards ===
Best Art-Direction (Series)	Best Cinematographer (Series)
**Rajneesh Hedao – The Forgotten Army - Azaadi Ke Liye**; Amit Waghchaure, Vishwanath Mistry – State of Siege: 26/11; Anna Ipe – Aarya; Sandeep Sharad Ravade – Special OPS; Sunil Nigvekar – Bard of Blood	**Sylvester Fonseca and Swapnil S. Sonawane – Sacred Games (Season 2)**; Chirantan Das – Bard of Blood; Richard Henkels – State of Siege: 26/11; Tanay Saatam – Betaal; Will Humphris – Taj Mahal 1989
Best Costume	Best Editor
**Ayesha Khanna – The Forgotten Army - Azaadi Ke Liye**; Ashima Belapurkar – Sacred Games (Season 2); Falguni Thakore – Special OPS; Preeti Sharma – The Verdict – State vs Nanavati; Theia Tekchandani – Aarya	**Praveen Kathikuloth – Special OPS**; Abhijeet Deshpande and Sangeeth Varghese – Betaal; Khushboo Raj and Abhimanyu Chaudhary – Aarya; Manish Jaitley – She; Nitin Baid, Antara Lahiri and Sangeeth Varghese – Bard of Blood

== Superlatives ==
=== Nominations and wins by program ===
Nominations by program
Nominations	Program	Streaming Media
11	Paatal Lok	Amazon Prime Video
8	Breathe: Into the Shadows	Amazon Prime Video
8	Special Ops	Hotstar
7	Aarya	Hotstar
7	Panchayat	Amazon Prime Video
7	The Family Man	Amazon Prime Video
5	Asur	Voot
5	Raat Akeli Hai	Netflix
3	Bulbbul	Netflix
3	Chintu Ka Birthday	ZEE5
3	Choked	Netflix
3	Guilty	Netflix
3	Little Things (Season 3)	Netflix
3	Sacred Games (Season 2)	Netflix
2	Amit Tandon: Family Tandoncies	Netflix
2	Bard of Blood	Netflix
2	Barot House	ZEE5
2	Four More Shots Please! (Season 2)	Amazon Prime Video
2	Ghost Stories	Netflix
2	Hum Tum Aur Them	ZEE5
2	Jamtara – Sabka Number Ayega	Netflix
2	Kanpuriye	Hotstar
2	Metro Park	Eros Now
2	The Forgotten Army - Azaadi Ke Liye	Amazon Prime Video
2	The Office	Hotstar

Wins by program
Wins	Program	Streaming Media
5	Paatal Lok	Amazon Prime Video
5	The Family Man	Amazon Prime Video
4	Panchayat	Amazon Prime Video
3	Special Ops	Hotstar
2	Bulbbul	Netflix
2	Little Things (Season 3)	Netflix
2	Raat Akeli Hai	Netflix
2	Sacred Games (Season 2)	Netflix
2	The Forgotten Army - Azaadi Ke Liye	Amazon Prime Video

=== Nominations and wins by streaming media ===
Nominations by streaming media
Nominations	Streaming Media
41	Amazon Prime Video
31	Netflix
20	Hotstar
12	ZEE5
6	Voot
2	Eros Now
2	MX Player

Wins by Streaming Media
Wins	Streaming Media
18	Amazon Prime Video
8	Netflix
4	Hotstar

== See also ==
- Filmfare Awards
- 2021 Filmfare OTT Awards
