= Oho Enthan Baby =

2025 Tamil film by Krishnakumar Ramakumar

- Theatrical release poster
- Directed by: Krishnakumar Ramakumar
- Written by: Mukesh Manjunath; Sarada Ramanathan
- Story by: Mukesh Manjunath
- Produced by: Vishnu Vishal; Raahul; KV Durai; Javid
- Starring: Rudra; Vishnu Vishal; Mithila Palkar
- Cinematography: Harish Kannan
- Edited by: RC Pranav
- Music by: Jen Martin; Ved Shankar
- Production companies: Vishnu Vishal Studioz; Romeo Pictures; Good Show
- Release date: 11 July 2025
- Running time: 130 minutes
- Country: India
- Language: Tamil

Oho Enthan Baby (transl. Oh my baby) is a 2025 Indian Tamil-language coming-of-age romantic comedy drama film directed by Krishnakumar Ramakumar in his directorial debut and written by Mukesh Manjunath and Sarada Ramanathan, starring Rudra and Mithila Palkar in the lead roles, marking their acting debut and Tamil debut respectively. The film also features Rudra's cousin Vishnu Vishal as himself, who jointly produced the film under his Vishnu Vishal Studioz alongside Raahul's Romeo Pictures and KV Durai's Good Show. The film also features Anju Kurian, Mysskin, Redin Kingsley, Karunakaran, Geetha Kailasam, Kasthuri, Nivaashiyni Krishnan and Vaibhavi Tandle in supporting roles.

Oho Enthan Baby was released in theatres on 11 July 2025.

== Plot ==
Ashwin, an aspiring filmmaker, meets with actor Vishnu Vishal to narrate his debut film story, "Vidiyale Vaa," a spoof thriller and psycho killer tale. However, the actor suggests that Ashwin come back with a better story. The actor's manager, King, recommends a love story suitable for the actor's image. So, Ashwin decides to narrate a love story based on his past relationships with three different women in his life. He begins with his first love story, set when he was in the 9th standard. Growing up in a dysfunctional family, where his father is a firm believer in astrology, leaves his government job to pursue a business venture, while his mother works as a bank employee. Ashwin finds solace in his paternal uncle Murali, a theater manager, and escapes into the world of cinema.

Idealized cinematic portrayals shape Ashwin's perception of love, and he develops feelings for his school senior, Raveena, who also happens to be his neighbor in their apartment. Raveena secretly meets Ashwin on the terrace, and they share a kiss. Ashwin's friend Rakesh "Rasna" Narayanan tells him that Raveena loves him, but Ashwin later discovers that Raveena's true love is actually someone else named Christopher. Heartbroken, Ashwin confronts Raveena, who rejects him, making it clear she's not interested in him romantically. Next, Ashwin intentionally skips mentioning his second love story and jumps to his third, where he falls for Meera, his best friend Anjali's cousin. Rasna is set to marry Anjali, and Ashwin accompanies Meera to Goa for the bachelorette party.

As Rasna and Anjali spend time together, Meera and Ashwin grow closer, and Ashwin is drawn to Meera's pragmatic nature. Despite their three-year age difference, Ashwin believes he's found his perfect partner in Meera. Meera mentions her past relationship with her ex-boyfriend, Gopal "Gops," and Ashwin shares his second love experience in college. He had been infatuated with a girl who seemed interested in him, but it turned out she was a lesbian who was actually in love with Anjali and was using Ashwin to get close to her. Meera, touched by Ashwin's innocence, kisses him. However, Meera is shocked by Ashwin's aggressive behavior when Ashwin gets into a road rage incident on their way back from the trip, which reminds her of her uncle's ruggedness. She shouts at him, but later apologizes. When Ashwin asks if she loves him, Meera confirms her feelings with a kiss.

Under her guidance, Ashwin starts working as an assistant director to Mysskin. However, Ashwin's father disapproves of his son's career choice, leading to Ashwin moving out and staying with Murali. Meera tries to console Ashwin, but his anger makes her uncomfortable, causing her to leave. Meera's uncle exploits her father's property, beats her mother, and prevents them from moving to the USA, subjecting Meera to torture at home. In desperation, Meera reaches out to Ashwin, but he ignores her calls. Their relationship deteriorates due to unresolved trauma, culminating in a heated argument where Meera accuses Ashwin of being self-centered. Ashwin's aggression frightens Meera, eventually leading to a breakup.

After learning that the story is based on Ashwin's real life, Vishnu Vishal encourages Ashwin to meet Meera and document their real-life reunion for the film's second half, insisting on a genuine and non-fictional ending. Ashwin's ego is hurt, but Vishnu Vishal is keen on collaborating if Ashwin delivers a true-to-life conclusion. Years after their breakup, Ashwin is now working as an assistant director to Mysskin, where the film's storyline has the lead character Vayamma, played by Vishnu Vishal, renouncing violence for his love for Padma, a role played by Anju Kurian, resonates with Ashwin. Mysskin asks him to put aside his ego and meet Meera again, and he decides to go meet Meera in Manipal.

Ashwin finds that Meera is now engaged to her ex-boyfriend Gops, and they are planning to move to the USA soon. Though Ashwin apologizes to Meera for his immature behavior during their breakup, their reunion doesn't lead to a romantic rekindling, and Vishnu Vishal asks Ashwin to write another story. Meanwhile, Meera discovers that Gops only wanted to marry her to gain a visa to the USA, and she breaks up with him. Ashwin focuses on fixing his family issues and decides to separate his parents. Ashwin's father, who had been missing his wife, begins to realize his mistakes. Ashwin learns that Meera's mother got locked in a room at Anjali's home and rushes to rescue her. However, he slips on a wet floor and gets hospitalized. Meera misunderstands that Ashwin came to Manipal only for his movie and not to apologize.

After watching a video of Vishnu Vishal talking about Ashwin's reluctance to make their love story into a film to protect Meera's peaceful life, her perception of Ashwin changes, and she decides to meet him in Chennai. At the film shoot, Meera unknowingly walks into a scene where a bomb blast is planned. Ashwin rushes to safeguard her, and although he gets caught in the blast, Meera rescues him. She apologizes for misunderstanding him and regrets her past actions. With Ashwin and Meera reunited, Vishnu Vishal agrees to proceed with the film based on their love story. The filming commences successfully, and Ashwin's parents, who have put aside their differences, visit the set to witness the filming.

== Cast ==
- Rudra as Ashwin
- Vishnu Vishal as Himself
- Mithila Palkar as Meera
- Anju Kurian as Herself
- Mysskin as Himself
- Redin Kingsley as King
- Karunakaran as Murali, Ashwin's uncle
- Geetha Kailasam as Raji, Meera's mother
- Balaji Sakthivel as Bhojaraj, Anjali's father
- Sujatha Babu as Anjali's mother
- Nirmal Pillai as Rakesh "Rasna" Narayanan, Ashwin’s friend and Anjali’s husband
- Nivaashiyni Krishnan as Anjali Bhojaraj, Meera’s cousin, Ashwin's friend and Rasna’s wife
- Arun Kurian as Gopal "Gops", Meera's ex-boyfriend
- Niharika Patro as Dr. Sharada, Meera's friend
- Vijayasarathy as Ashwin's father
- Kasthuri as Ashwin's mother
- Vaibhavi Tandle as Raveena, Ashwin's ex-lover
- Ajith Koshy as Meera's uncle
- Aarya Lakshmi as Varsha AD
- Nikhila Shankar as Padma's sister
- Aroul D. Shankar as Padma's father
- Muthulakshmi as Padma's mother
- Nandita as Lalitha, Raveena's mother
- Moses as Raveena's father
- Dipshi Blessy as Vishnu Vishal's interviewer
- Krishnakumar Ramakumar as an Astrologer (uncredited)

== Production ==
On 11 February 2024, actor Vishnu Vishal announced his next production venture titled Oho Enthan Baby starring his cousin Rudra in the lead role. The film marks the acting debut of Rudra, alongside Little Things (2016), Karwaan (2018) and Chopsticks (2019) fame Mithila Palkar as the female lead, in her Tamil debut. The title of the film is a callback to the song of the same name from the 1961 film Thennilavu composed and sung by A. M. Rajah alongwith S. Janaki. The film is written and directed by Krishnakumar Ramakumar, who last directed an episode Kaadhal Enbadhu Kannula Heart Irukkura Emoji, starring Ritu Varma in the anthology series, Modern Love Chennai (2023), while it is produced jointly produced by Vishnu under his Vishnu Vishal Studioz, along with Raahul's Romeo Pictures and KV Durai's Good Show.

The first schedule of the principal photography planned for about two weeks to be shot across Chennai and Goa began on 11 February 2024. On 14 February 2025, Mithila announced that she had completed shooting for her portions in the film.

== Music ==
Oho Enthan Baby

Soundtrack album by Jen Martin and Ved Shankar
- Studios: JM Records; 20db Sound Studio, Chennai
- Genre: Feature film soundtrack
- Language: Tamil
- Label: Think Music
- Producers: Jen Martin; Ved Shankar

Jen Martin chronology
| Then Chennai (2024) | Oho Enthan Baby (2025) | Kiss (2025) |

Singles from Oho Enthan Baby
- 1. "Natchathira" Released: 17 June 2025; 2. "Oho Enthan Baby - Title Track" Released: 23 June 2025

The film has music composed by Jen Martin and Ved Shankar. The first video single "Natchathira" was released on 17 June 2025. The title track was released on 23 June 2025.

Track listing
| No. | Title | Lyrics | Music | Singer(s) | Length |
|---|---|---|---|---|---|
| 1. | "Oho Enthan Baby - Title Track" | Ashique AR | Jen Martin | Sid Sriram | 3:45 |
| 2. | "Natchathira" | Karthik Netha, Ashique AR | Jen Martin | Priya Mali, Abishek Suresh, Sathya Narayanan | 3:04 |
| 3. | "Konji Pesi" | Ashique AR | Jen Martin | Jen Martin | 3:16 |
| 4. | "Kadhal Ettipaka" | Vishnu Edavan | Jen Martin | Leon James, Jen Martin | 2:44 |
| 5. | "Cute 'u' Ponnu" | Vishnu Selvan | Jen Martin | Jen Martin, Lavita Lobo | 2:09 |
| 6. | "Vaada Rascolu" | Mani Amudhavanan | Ved Shankar | Anthony Daasan | 3:40 |
| Total length: | | | | | 18:38 |

== Release ==
Oho Enthan Baby released in theatres on 11 July 2025. The post-theatrical streaming rights have been acquired by Netflix.

== Reception ==
=== Critical response ===
M Suganth of The Times of India gave 3/5 stars and wrote "Oho Enthan Baby's plot developments do make us say, 'Oh so familiar, baby' and the resolutions it offers are too neat for characters who are flawed and scarred, but there is enough freshness in the filmmaking to keep us engaged and overlook the convenient writing." Janani K of India Today gave 2.5/5 stars and wrote "'Oho Enthan Baby' is a great attempt at crafting a love story that reflects this age's love story. The film delivered what it promised, but it's only half-baked." Akshay Kumar of Cinema Express gave 2/5 stars and wrote "Oho Enthan Baby is another film that promises much and delivers less. It had a pretty decent start for an emotional love story, only to lose itself in the woods. The lack of proper alignment between the characters and their motivations unhooks us from the narrative and lets it stay that way."
