= Mukul Chadda =

Indian actor

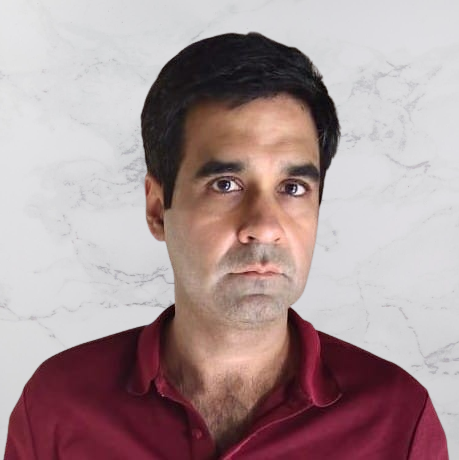
- Born: Madras, Tamil Nadu, India
- Other name: Mukul Chadha
- Education: IIM Ahmedabad
- Occupation: Actor
- Years active: 2012–present
- Known for: The Office; Sherni
- Spouse: Rasika Dugal (m. 2010)

Mukul Chadda is an Indian actor who works in Hindi cinema.

== Early life and education ==
Mukul was born in Madras (now Chennai), in the state of Tamil Nadu. He completed a bachelor's in Mathematics at the prestigious St Stephen's College, Delhi and is an MBA graduate from IIM Ahmedabad. It was after working in a bank in New York City that he decided to take his passion for acting forward.

== Personal life ==
Mukul has been married to actress Rasika Dugal since 2010 after dating for 3 years.

== Filmography ==
=== Films ===
Year	Title	Role	Notes	Refs.
2012	Ek Main Aur Ekk Tu	Karan Sharma		
2012	Ek Bahut Choti Si Love Story		Short film	
2013	I, Me Aur Main	Adil		
2013	Satyagraha	Harinath		
2014	Shuruaat Ka Interval	Lawyer		
2014	Butnama	Rinku	Short film	
2015	Island City	Insurance MC		
2015	Best Friends Forever	Parichit	Short film	
2016	Gurgaon	Kalra	Released on Amazon Prime Video	
2017	Pressure Cooker		Short film	
2020	Banana Bread	Neighbour	Short film; also writer, cinematographer	
2021	Sherni	Pawan	Released on Amazon Prime Video	
2024	Fairy Folk	Mohit	Released on Amazon Prime Video	
2025	Dhoom Dhaam	Sanjay Reberio	Released on Netflix	

=== Web series ===
Year	Title	Role	Platform	Ref.
2018	Zero KMS	Shyam	Zee5	
2019	The Insiders	Roy Uncle	MX Player	
2019	The Office	Jagdeep Chadda	Hotstar	
2020	Bicchoo Ka Khel	Babu Shrivastav	Alt Balaji	
2021	Sunflower	Mr. Ahuja	Zee5	
2023	Rana Naidu	Eijaz Sheikh	Netflix	
2023	Made in Heaven (TV Series)	Rohit Ahuja	Amazon Prime Video	
2024	Big Girls Don't Cry	Vipin Ahuja	Amazon Prime Video	
2025	Search: The Naina Murder Case	Bheesham	JioHotstar	

== Awards and nominations ==
Year	Award Show	Award	Show	Result	Ref(s)
2019	Gold Awards	Best Actor in a comic role – Male	The Office	Nominated	
2019	iReel Awards	Best Actor Male (Comedy)	The Office	Nominated	
2020	Filmfare OTT Awards	Best Actor (Comedy Series)	The Office	Nominated	
2020	E4M Streaming Media Awards	Best Actor in a Comic Role	The Office	Won	
2021	IWM Digital Award	Most popular Actor in a Comic Role in a web Series	The Office Season 2	Nominated	
2021	FOI Online Award	Best Performance by an Ensemble Cast (Sherni)	Sherni	Nominated	
2022	Yellowstone International Film festival	Outstanding Performance in a Feature Film (Lead Male)	Fairy Folk	Won	
2022	Indian Telly Streaming Awards	Fan Favourite Villain	Sunflower	Nominated	
2024	FOI Online Award	Best Actor in a Leading Role	Fairy Folk	Nominated	
