= Tripling =

Tripling may refer to:

- Multiplication – multiplying a number by 3
- Rule of three (writing) – creating an expression with three parts to make it more effective
- TVF Tripling – an Indian web series
