= Single Papa =

2025 Indian television series

- Promotional release poster
- Genre: Comedy drama
- Created by: Neeraj Udhwani; Ishita Moitra
- Showrunner: Shashank Khaitan
- Written by: Neeraj Udhwani; Ishita Moitra; Shruti Madan
- Directed by: Shashank Khaitan; Hitesh Kewalya; Neeraj Udhwani
- Starring: Kunal Khemu; Prajakta Koli; Manoj Pahwa; Ayesha Raza Mishra
- Composer: Aman Pant
- Country of origin: India
- Original language: Hindi
- No. of seasons: 1
- No. of episodes: 6

Production
- Executive producer: Shashank Khaitan
- Producers: Aditya Pittie; Samar Khan
- Cinematography: Pratik Deora
- Editor: Manann A Sagar
- Camera setup: Multi-camera
- Running time: 32–45 minutes
- Production company: Juggernaut Productions

Original release
- Network: Netflix
- Release: 12 December 2025 – present

Single Papa (lit. 'Single Dad') is a 2025 Indian Hindi-language comedy-drama television series created by Neeraj Udhwani and Ishita Moitra for Netflix. It features Kunal Khemu as Gaurav Gehlot, a lovable, confused man-child learning fatherhood after an unexpected adoption, alongside Manoj Pahwa, Ayesha Raza Mishra and Prajakta Koli.

== Premise ==
The series follows Gaurav "GG" Gehlot, whose life takes an unexpected turn when he adopts a baby soon after his divorce. His decision disrupts the dynamics of the Gehlot family, leading to a mix of conflicts, adjustments and emotional growth as they navigate the challenges of sudden parenthood.

== Cast ==
- Kunal Khemu as Gaurav Gehlot
- Prajakta Koli as Namrata, Gaurav's sister
- Manoj Pahwa as Jatin Gehlot, Gaurav's father
- Neha Dhupia as Romilla Nehra
- Ayesha Raza Mishra as Poonam Gehlot, Gaurav's mother
- Ankur Rathee as Anand "Goldie" Aggarwal
- Isha Talwar as Aparna Gehlot, Gaurav's ex-wife
- Dayanand Shetty as Parbat Singh
- Suhail Nayyar as Pawan, Gaurav's best friend
- Aisha Ahmed as Shreya Aggarwal
- Hami Ali as Amul
- Ishitta Arun as Meenu Minocha
- Azinkya Mishra as Shlok
- Priyam Galav as Sharanya
- Tuhina Das as Saoni Ghosh
- Naresh Gosain as Mishra Ji
- Sahil Shroff as Ayaan
- Tanaya Sachdeva as Inara

== Episodes ==
No.	Title	Directed by	Written by	Original release date
1	"Dekho, Mujhe Kya Mila?"	Shashank Khaitan	Neeraj Udhwani, Ishita Moitra	12 December 2025
2	"Love Nahi, Lovest!"	Hitesh Kewalya	Neeraj Udhwani, Ishita Moitra	12 December 2025
3	"Dikha Denge Apni Power!"	Neeraj Udhwani	Neeraj Udhwani, Ishita Moitra, Shruti Madan	12 December 2025
4	"Asli Single Papa"	Neeraj Udhwani, Hitesh Kewalya	Neeraj Udhwani, Ishita Moitra	12 December 2025
5	"Chattan Nahi, Parbat!"	Neeraj Udhwani, Hitesh Kewalya	Neeraj Udhwani, Ishita Moitra	12 December 2025
6	"Papa Bola!"	Shashank Khaitan, Hitesh Kewalya	Ishita Moitra, Neeraj Udhwani	12 December 2025

== Soundtrack ==
Single Papa

Soundtrack album
- Released: 11 December 2025
- Length: 23:53
- Language: Hindi
- Label: T-Series

Official audio
- Single Papa (Audio Jukebox) on YouTube

Track listing
No.	Title	Lyrics	Music	Singer(s)	Length
1.	"GG Ki Ghaintness"	Shubh Khillari	Aman Pant	Aman Pant	2:21
2.	"Single Papa Title Track"	Kunal Khemu	Kunal Khemu, Raghav Meattle, Khwaab	Kunal Khemu	2:42
3.	"Ib Na Jaane"	Akhil Tiwari, Aman Pant	Aman Pant, Soumya M, Shobin Shaji Joy	Aman Pant	2:44
4.	"Ajab Yeh Ishq"	Shashank Khaitan, Akhil Tiwari	Neil Andrew	Saaj Bhatt	3:35
5.	"Chura Loon Saare Taare"	Akhil Tiwari	Aman Pant, Shobin Shaji Joy	Amant Pant	3:36
6.	"Tu Hi Sahiba"	Dridha, Aman Pant	Aman Pant, Neil Andrew, Shobin Shaji Joy	Dridha, Saaj Bhatt	3:35
7.	"Ghotala"	Akhil Tiwari	Aman Pant	Aman Pant, Siddharth Sen, Akhil Tiwari	2:31
8.	"Ajab Yeh Ishq (Reprise)"	Shashank Khaitan, Akhil Tiwari	Aman Pant	Saaj Bhatt	2:49
Total length:					23:53

== Release ==
The trailer was released on 2 December 2025, and the series premiered on 12 December 2025 on Netflix.

== Reception ==
Lachmi Deb Roy of Firstpost rated the series 3.5/5 stars and wrote, "Despite a few loose ends, Single Papa is indeed an enjoyable ride. Sometimes, the show does get loud trying to portray the lavish Gurugram culture, but at the end of the day it is thoughtful entertainment." Shreyas Pande of The Hindu wrote, "There is a fun, feel-good and festive vibe to the show, even though the sets and production design carry a sense of plasticity. It is a Netflix series after all and the grandness is up for show."

Sana Farzeen of India Today rated the series 3/5 stars and wrote, "It’s messy, stretched, sometimes clumsy. But it has its heart in the right place. And in a world where we’re still arguing over who should change the diaper, a show that spotlights men nurturing, crying, softening – and still being strong – feels like a conversation worth having." Shubhra Gupta of The Indian Express gave it 2.5/5 stars and wrote, "The premise of Kunal Kemmu show is interesting, and the setting is ripe for excavating societal hypocrisies revolving around parenthood, and while it’s at it, hoovering up issues like adoption, women’s rights, and of course, patriarchy."

Rahul Desai of The Hollywood Reporter India observed that "Despite a fun cast, the six-episode Netflix comedy is happy to be a rehashed portrait of single parenthood." A critic of Bollywood Hungama rated it 3.5/5 stars and said that "On the whole, SINGLE PAPA is a rare, clean, family-friendly web show that impresses thanks to its subject, performances, comic dialogues and emotional moments." Deepa Gahlot of Rediff.com gave 3 stars out of 5 and noted out that "In the midst of crime and cop shows all over, a family comedy comes as a relief."

Nandini Ramnath of Scroll.in said that "The sitcom-like humour is haphazard by design as well as without meaning to be. Single Papa is all over the place, but sharp casting, committed actors who have some great lines, and an excellent lead actor keep the show on the rails." Troy Ribeiro of Free Press Journal rated 3.5/5 stars and said that "Single Papa is not groundbreaking, but it is undoubtedly heartwarming. It offers a fresh Indian twist on single-parenting stories, blending melodrama with humour and emotion in equal measure.
