= Jijivisha =

- Directed by: Swechha
- Release date: 2005
- Country: India

Jijivisha is a documentary on the river Yamuna made in 2005 by Swechha with contributions from Kuber Sharma, Ishita Moitra, Shirley Abraham, Charulatha Menon and Amit Madheshia.

The film traces the journey of the river from Yamunotri to Allahabad through cities such as Delhi and Agra.

It was directed by Vimlendu Jha, Amit Madhesia, Charulatha Menon and Ishita Moitra. Vimlendu Jha also produced the film.
