= Amol Parashar =

Indian actor (born 1986)

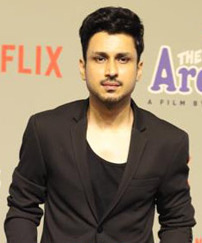
- Parashar in 2023
- Born: 17 September 1986 (age 39); New Delhi, India
- Education: Indian Institute of Technology Delhi
- Occupation: Actor
- Years active: 2009–present

Amol Parashar (born 17 September 1986) is an Indian actor, best known for his versatile portrayals of popular characters across web shows and films. His most famous character is of Chitvan Sharma in the web series TVF Tripling and playing the legendary Indian Freedom Revolutionary Bhagat Singh in Shoojit Sircar's acclaimed Sardar Udham.

He has also starred in films like Dolly Kitty Aur Woh Chamakte Sitare opposite Konkona Sen Sharma, and Traffic opposite Manoj Bajpayee, Hindi remake of a Malayalam thriller film. Parashar was last seen in the comedy caper Cash in his first lead role, produced by Vishesh Bhatt.

Amol also starred in It Happened in HongKong opposite Aahana Kumra.

== Education ==
Parashar graduated from Indian Institute of Technology Delhi as a Mechanical engineer and later quit his job at ZS Associates to join the arts.

== Awards ==
Best Actor (Comedy) Award at News18 India's iReel Awards 2019 for TVF Tripling

== TV commercials ==
Throughout his acting career, Parashar has been the face of many national and international brands. Some of those brands include Pepsi, Cadbury, Tanishq, Mentos, Wild Stone amongst many others.

== Filmography ==
Films

Year	Title	Role	notes
2009	Rocket Singh: Salesman of the Year	Sai	
2014	Babloo Happy Hai	Rohan	
2014	Dombivli Return	Sridhar Velankar	Marathi film
2015	Mili	Arun Iyyer	Malayalam film
2016	Traffic	Rajeev	
2018	Gabru: Hip Hop Ke Shehzaade	MC Money	
2018	Ready2Mingle	Nirav	
2020	Dolly Kitty Aur Woh Chamakte Sitare	Osman Ansari	
2021	Sardar Udham	Bhagat Singh	
2021	Cash	Armaan Gulati	Hotstar film
2022	36 Farmhouse	Harry	ZEE5 film
2025	Sweet Dreams	Kenny	Hotstar film

Web series

Year	Title	Role	Note
2016	TVF Tripling	Chitvan	
2017	TVF Bisht Please	Soham	
2018	It Happened in Hong Kong	Amol	Viu Web series
2018	Home	Vansh	ALT Balaji series
2019	TVF Tripling Season 2	Chitvan	Web series
2019	Parchhayee	Rahul	Zee5 Web series
2020	A Viral Wedding	Rishabh Sinha	Eros Now Miniseries
2021	Feels Like Ishq	Jay	Netflix Series; S01E01:"Save the da(y)te"
2025	Gram Chikitsalay	Dr. Prabhat Sinha	Prime Video Web series
2025	Kull: The Legacy of the Raisingghs	Abhimanyu Raisinggh	Web series on JioHotstar
