= News18 Reel Awards =

Annual Indian award show

- Awarded for: Excellence in Films and Web Series
- Country: India
- Presented by: News 18
- First award: 2018
- Website: Official website

The News18 Reel Awards, formerly known as iReel Awards, is an annual Indian award ceremony, presented by News 18 to honour excellence in Indian cinema and the OTT industry. Winners are decided through online voting.

== History ==
In August 2018, News18.com announced iReel Awards 2018, a web series specific awards in India. The first event was held on 6 September 2018 at JW Marriott, Juhu in Mumbai.

== Ceremonies ==
Date	Ceremony	Reference
6 Sep 2018	1st iReel Awards	
23 Sep 2019	2nd iReel Awards	

== Categories ==
=== Best Actor (Drama) ===
Year	Actor	Role	Program	Network
2018	Nawazuddin Siddiqui	Ganesh Gaitonde	Sacred Games	Netflix
2018	Rajkummar Rao	Subhas Chandra Bose	Bose: Dead/Alive	ALTBalaji
2018	R. Madhavan	Danny Mascarenhas	Breathe	Amazon Prime
2018	Rithvik Sahore	Aakash	Laakhon Mein Ek	Amazon Prime
2018	Anshuman Malhotra	Siddharth	Class of 2017	ALTBalaji
2019	Pankaj Tripathi	Akhandanand Tripathi	Mirzapur	Amazon Prime
2019	Nawazuddin Siddiqui	Ganesh Gaitonde	Sacred Games 2	Netflix
2019	Ronit Roy	SP Prithvi Singh	Hostages	Hotstar
2019	Vikrant Massey	Aditya Sharma	Criminal Justice	Hotstar
2019	Arjun Mathur	Karan Mehra	Made in Heaven	Amazon Prime

=== Best Actress (Drama) ===
Year	Actor	Role	Program	Network
2018	Nimrat Kaur	Shikha Sharma	The Test Case	ALTBalaji
2018	Tridha Choudhury	Sana Sanyal	Spotlight	Viu
2018	Nia Sharma	Aliyah Mukherjee	Twisted	YouTube
2018	Karishma Sharma	Ragini	Ragini MMS: Returns	ALTBalaji
2018	Patralekha Paul	Nandi	Bose: Dead/Alive	ALTBalaji
2019	Shefali Shah	DCP Vartika Chaturvedi	Delhi Crime	Netflix
2019	Supriya Pilgaonkar	Vandana Sethi	Home	ALTBalaji
2019	Sobhita Dhulipala	Tara Khanna	Made in Heaven	Amazon Prime
2019	Dia Mirza	Kainaaz Akhtar	Kaafir	ZEE5
2019	Shweta Tripathi	Dr. Shreya Pathare	Laakhon Mein Ek 2	Amazon Prime

=== Best Actor (Comedy) ===
Year	Actor	Role	Program	Network
2018	Bhupesh Singh	Hariman Singh	Shaitaan Haveli	Amazon Prime
2018	Kanchan Porgare	Gangu	Shaitaan Haveli	Amazon Prime
2018	Biswapati Sarkar	Sanjay	Mr. and Mrs.	YouTube
2018	Sukant Goel	Rishi	The Better Half/Dolly Ki Shaadi	YouTube
2018	Zeishan Quadri	Akki	Akki Vikki Te Nikki	YouTube
2019	Amol Parashar	Chitvan Sharma	Tripling 2	YouTube
2019	Mukul Chadda	Jagdeep Chadda	The Office	Hotstar
2019	Kunaal Roy Kapur	Kunaal Roy Kapur	Side Hero	Eros Now
2019	Dhruv Sehgal	Dhruv Vats	Little Things 2	Netflix
2019	Ranvir Shorey	Kalpesh Patel	Metro Park	Eros Now

=== Best Actress (Comedy) ===
Year	Actor	Role	Program	Network
2018	Sumukhi Suresh	Pushpavalli	Pushpavalli	Amazon Prime
2018	Kriti Garg	Menka	Azad Parindey	YouTube
2018	Mansi Parekh	Meera	Bin Bulaye Mehmaan	YouTube
2018	Archita Agarwal	Kiara	Virgin Woman Diary	YouTube
2018	Mukti Mohan	Kay	InMates	YouTube
2019	Mithila Palkar	Kavya Kulkarni	Little Things 2	Netflix
2019	Srishti Shrivastava	Anandi "Jo" Joshi	Girls Hostel	Netflix
2019	Purbi Joshi	Payal Patel	Metro Park	Eros Now
2019	Maanvi Gagroo	Chanchal Sharma	Tripling 2	YouTube
2019	Geetanjali Kulkarni	Shanti Mishra	Gullak	SonyLIV

=== Best Supporting Actor ===
Year	Actor	Role	Program	Network
2018	Jitendra Joshi	Constable Katekar	Sacred Games	Netflix
2018	Naseeruddin Shah	Guru	Zero Kms	ZEE5
2018	Tanuj Virwani	Vayu Raghavan	Inside Edge	Amazon Prime
2018	Ashish Verma	Madhav	InMates	YouTube
2018	Karamvir Lamba	Sundeep	Karenjit Kaur	ZEE5
2019	Divyendu Sharma	Phoolchand Tripathi	Mirzapur	Amazon Prime
2019	Jackie Shroff	Mustafa	Criminal Justice	Hotstar
2019	Rajesh Tailang	Inspector Bhupendra Singh	Delhi Crime	Netflix
2019	Brijendra Kala	Satendra Sharma	The Aam Aadmi Family	YouTube
2019	Jim Sarbh	Adil Khanna	Made in Heaven	Amazon Prime

=== Best Supporting Actress ===
Year	Actor	Role	Program	Network
2018	Aahana Kumra	Shahana Vasishtha	Inside Edge	Amazon Prime
2018	Dipannita Sharma	Nishqa S. Bajaj	Bewafaa sii Wafaa	ALTBalaji
2018	Grusha Kapoor	Balwant Kaur Vohra	Karenjit Kaur	ZEE5
2018	Meenakshi Sethi		Dolly Ki Shaadi	YouTube
2018	Akanksha Thakur	Richa	InMates	YouTube
2019	Amruta Subhash	Kusum Devi	Sacred Games 2	Netflix
2019	Grusha Kapoor	Balwant Kaur Vohra	Karenjit Kaur 2	ZEE5
2019	Rasika Dugal	Beena Tripathi	Mirzapur	Amazon Prime
2019	Shivani Raghuvanshi	Jaspreet "Jazz" Kaur	Made in Heaven	Amazon Prime
2019	Lubna Salim	Mrs. Madhu Sharma	The Aam Aadmi Family	YouTube

=== Best Drama Series ===
Year	Series	Platform
2018	Sacred Games	Netflix
2019	Delhi Crime	Netflix
2019	Sacred Games 2	Netflix
2019	Made in Heaven	Amazon Prime
2019	Mirzapur	Amazon Prime
2019	Kota Factory	Netflix
2019	Typewriter	Netflix

=== Best Comedy Series ===
Year	Series	Platform
2018	Pushpavalli	Amazon Prime
2019	Little Things 2	Netflix
2019	Metro Park	Eros Now
2019	Girls Hostel	Netflix
2019	Gullak	SonyLIV
2019	The Office	Hotstar
2019	Tripling 2	YouTube

=== Best Writing (Drama) ===
Year	Series	Recipient	Platform
2018	Sacred Games	Varun Grover; Smita Singh; Vasant Nath	Netflix
2019	Delhi Crime	Richie Mehta	Netflix
2019	Typewriter	Sujoy Ghosh, Suresh Nair	Netflix
2019	Made in Heaven	Reema Kagti; Zoya Akhtar; Alankrita Shrivastava	Amazon Prime
2019	Kota Factory	Saurabh Khanna	Netflix
2019	Laakhon Mein Ek 2	Shweta More	Amazon Prime

=== Best Writing (Comedy) ===
Year	Series	Recipient	Platform
2018	Mr. and Mrs.	Preksha Khanna; Pradyot Mokashi	YouTube
2019	Gullak	Nikhil Vijay	YouTube
2019	Booo Sabki Phategi	Farhad Samji; Tasha Bhambra, Sparsh Khetrapal	ALT Balaji
2019	Girls Hostel	Shreyasi Sharma,	Netflix
2019	Side Hero	Nipun Dharmadhikari	Eros Now
2019	Tripling 2	Akarsh Khurana, Sumeet Vyas	YouTube

=== Best Music ===
Year	Show	Recipient	Platform
2019	Sacred Games 2	Alokananda Dasgupta	Netflix
2019	RejctX	Sneha Khanwalkar	ZEE5
2019	Made in Heaven	Tarana Marwah, Gaurav Raina	Amazon Prime
2019	Rangbaaz	Bhav Dhulia	ZEE5
2019	Four More Shots	Mikey McCleary	Amazon Prime

=== Best Non-fiction Show ===
Year	Show	Platform
2019	Comicstaan 2	Amazon Prime
2019	Roar of the Lions	Hotstar
2019	Cricket Fever	Netflix

=== Best Ensemble ===
Year	Show	Platform	Result
2018	Mirzapur	Amazon Prime	Won

== See also ==
- List of Asian television awards
