= Dhruv Sehgal =

Indian actor and writer

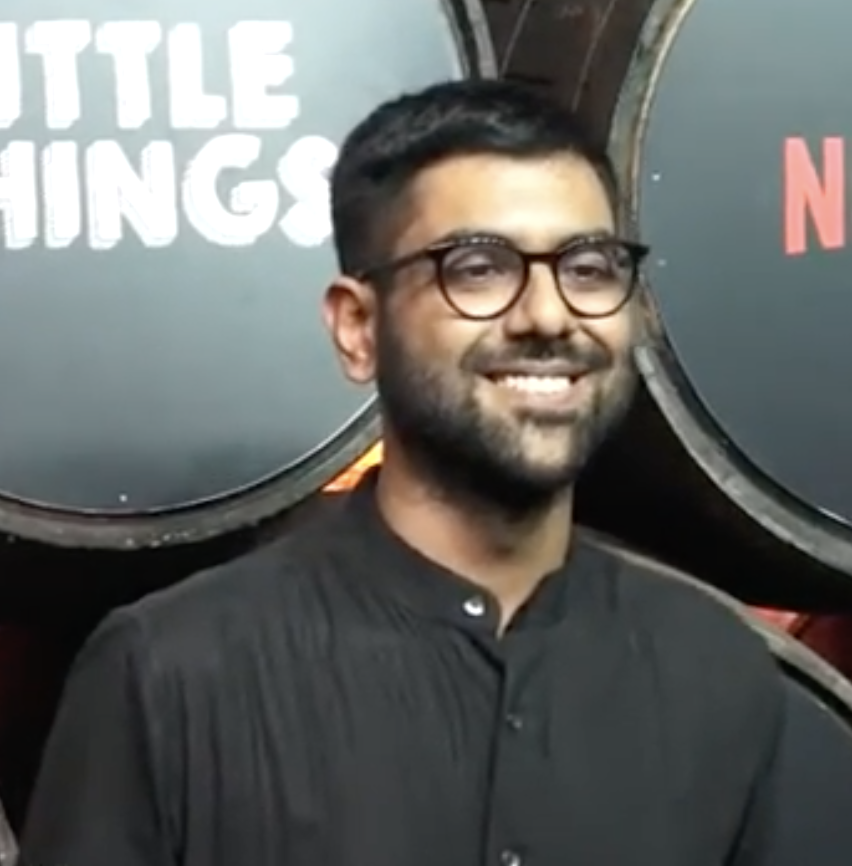
- Sehgal in 2021
- Born: 19 March 1990 (age 36); Delhi, India
- Education: Symbiosis Institute of Media and Communication
- Occupations: Writer, actor
- Spouse: Kannagi Khanna (m. 2021)
- Awards: MTV IWMBuzz Digital Awards (2019): Filmfare OTT Award

Dhruv Sehgal (born 19 March 1990) is an Indian actor, writer and director. He is best known for his work in Dice Media's and Netflix romantic comedy series Little Things, where he portrayed Dhruv Vats alongside Mithila Palkar.

== Life and career ==
Sehgal is from Delhi. After completing his school in London, he studied at Symbiosis Institute of Media and Communication, Pune. Sehgal worked as an associate director and co-editor for the documentaries Baavra Mann (2013) and I Am Offended! (2015). His short film Kunal won the Golden Gateway Dimensions Mumbai Award at the Mumbai Film Festival, 2016 and was selected for the Mumbai International Film Festival. He has written, acted and directed comedy sketches for Filter Copy and conceptualised three of Dice Media's webseries. He took the lead in the series Little Things, opposite Mithila Palkar, beginning in 2016. Sehgal is the creator and head writer of the series.

He married Kannagi Khanna, his college girlfriend.

Work	Award	Category	Result	Ref
Little Things (TV series)	MTV IWMBuzz Digital Awards 2019	Storyteller of The Year	Won	
Little Things (TV series)	MTV IWMBuzz Digital Awards 2019	Best Youth Show	Won	
Little Things (TV series)	Critics Choice Shorts & Series Awards 2019	Best Writing (Comedy/ Romance)	Won	
Little Things (TV series)	Critics Choice Shorts & Series Awards 2019	Best Actor in Comedy/ Romance (share with Vikrant Massey)	Won	
Little Things (TV series)	Critics Choice Shorts & Series Awards 2019	Best Series (Comedy/ Romance)	Won	
Little Things (TV series)	IReel Awards 2019	Best Actor in Comedy Series	Nominated	
Little Things (TV series)	2020 Filmfare OTT Awards	Best Comedy Series	Nominated	
Little Things (TV series)	2020 Filmfare OTT Awards	Best Actor in Comedy Series	Nominated	
Little Things (TV series)	2020 Filmfare OTT Awards	Critics Best Actor in Comedy Series	Won	

== Recognition ==
- Best Short Film at MAMI-2016 for Kunal.
