= Sweet Dreams (2025 film) =

- Release poster
- Directed by: Victor Mukherjee
- Written by: Victor Mukherjee
- Produced by: Jyoti Deshpande; Neha Anand; Pranjal Khandhdiya
- Starring: Amol Parashar; Mithila Palkar
- Cinematography: Hanoz V.K.
- Edited by: Manikandan Nayakam
- Music by: Dewal Prashar
- Production companies: Jio Studios; Mango People Media
- Distributed by: Disney+ Hotstar
- Release date: 24 January 2025
- Running time: 109 minutes
- Country: India
- Language: Hindi

Sweet Dreams is a 2025 Indian Hindi-language romantic drama film written and directed by Victor Mukherjee. Produced under Jio Studios and Mango People Media, the film stars Amol Parashar and Mithila Palkar. The film premiered on 24 January 2025 on Disney+ Hotstar.

== Cast ==
- Amol Parashar as Kenny
- Mithila Palkar as Dia
- Meiyang Chang as Ishant
- Sauraseni Maitra as Roop

== Production ==
The film was announced by Jio Studios. An Indian adaptation of the 2014 Canadian film In My Dreams. Amol Parashar and Mithila Palkar was cast to appear in the film. The trailer of the film was released on 20 January 2025.

== Music ==
Sweet Dreams

Soundtrack album by Mukund Suryawanshi, Akashdeep Sengupta
- Released: 2025
- Genre: Feature film soundtrack
- Length: 6:58
- Language: Hindi
- Label: Worldwide Records

The songs were composed by Mukund Suryawanshi, and Akashdeep Sengupta.

Track listing
No.	Title	Lyrics	Music	Singer(s)	Length
1.	"Naina Lage"	Anjali Khandelwal	Mukund Suryawanshi	Mukund Suryawanshi	3:19
2.	"Tu Behja"	Shloke Lal, Akshay The One (Rap)	Akashdeep Sengupta	Shruti Pathak, Akshay The One (Rap)	3:39
Total length:					6:58

== Reception ==
Vineeta Kumar of India Today rated the movie 2.5/5. Shaheen Irani of OTTplay gave 2.5 out of 5 stars.
