= Mithila Palkar =

Indian actress (born 1993)

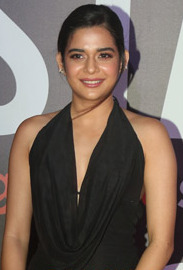
- Palkar in 2023
- Born: 11 January 1993 (age 33); Mumbai, Maharashtra, India
- Education: M. M. K. College
- Occupations: Actress; singer
- Years active: 2014–present

Mithila Palkar (born 11 January 1993) is an Indian actress known for her work in Hindi films and web series. She has received several awards, including a Filmfare Award Marathi and two Filmfare OTT Awards.

Palkar made her acting debut with the Marathi short film Majha Honeymoon (2014) and then expanded to Hindi films Katti Batti (2015). Palkar then rose to prominence with her Marathi version of the "cup song". She is best known for her role in the television show Girl in the City (2016–2021) and the web series Little Things (2016–2021). The latter earned her Filmfare OTT Awards for Best Actress – Comedy Series and Best Actress Critics – Comedy Series. She earned the Filmfare Award for Best Female Debut – Marathi for her performance in Muramba (2017). Her other notable films include Karwaan (2018) and Tribhanga (2021).

== Early life ==
Palkar was born on 11 January 1993 into a Marathi family. She initially lived in Vasai with her parents but she and her sister later moved to live in Dadar with her maternal grandparents due to inconveniences of daily commute. She comes from a family with no actors, and her grandfather initially did not approve of her decision to act. Her sister holds a PhD in Neuroscience and lives in Los Angeles. Palkar first acted while in Class VII in an inter-school drama competition. She admits being a "nerd" but was always active in dramatics, dancing and singing during her school days at IES's Modern English School, Dadar. She pursued science in higher secondary but chose to pursue a Bachelors of Mass Media (BMM) at MMK College, Bandra, after that to be involved with films and theatre. After graduating in 2013, Palkar gave her first audition to Quasar Padamsee of Quasar Theatre Productions (QTP). The audition did not get her the role but Quasar gave her a job backstage, managing their theatre festival, Thespo. Palkar has previously trained in Hindustani classical music (by the Marathi singer Varsha Bhave), in Kathak, and took a crash course in acting at the Stella Adler Studio of Acting in Los Angeles.

== Career ==
Palkar made her acting debut in the 2014 Marathi short film Majha Honeymoon, which was showcased at the 16th Mumbai International Film Festival. Her first success in the Indian film industry was in June 2014, when she successfully auditioned for the role of Imran Khan's sister in Katti Batti. The film did not do well

Meanwhile, Dhruv Sehgal, who met Palkar at Thespo (QTP's annual theatre festival), asked her to audition for Filter Copy's new satire show on YouTube called News Darshan. She not only succeeded in that audition but also went on to do her first web series called Girl in the City in 2016 for Bindass and a number of YouTube videos for Pocket Aces. One of these is a web series called Little Things alongside Sehgal since 2017, which has achieved a lot of popularity and was also published as a book by Penguin Random House. Netflix purchased the franchise of Little Things in 2018 and its second season premiered on Netflix on 5 October 2018. The third season of Little Things premiered on 9 November 2019. The fourth and final season of Little Things premiered on 15 October 2021.

In 2017, she appeared in two plays, Tunni Ki Kahani (a children's musical) and Aaj Rang Hai (a Hindustani musical) with the theatre group called Aarambh. Later that year, Palkar made her debut in Marathi cinema with the film Muramba, alongside Amey Wagh. 2018 saw Palkar playing her first lead role in a Hindi film called Karwaan, alongside Irrfan Khan, Dulquer Salmaan and Kriti Kharbanda. The film released on 3 August 2018.

In 2019, she acted in Chopsticks, a Netflix original film, directed by Sachin Yardi. In the film, she played role of an under-confident girl named Nirma (after the washing powder brand) whose life changes when she meets a con man, played by Abhay Deol. She later acted with Dhruv Sehgal in Taco Bell's digital campaign for their new product Quesalupa (a crossover between a chalupa and a quesadilla that is filled with cheese) titled #TheCheesyPull. Palkar's next project was the Netflix film Tribhanga, directed by Renuka Shahane, featuring Tanvi Azmi and Kajol. The film began shooting in October 2019.

== Other work and media image ==
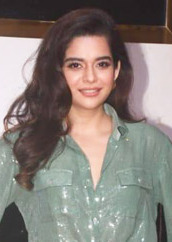
Palkar at an event

Palkar grew popular overnight in March 2016 with her version of the "cup song", inspired by Anna Kendrick's cup song from Pitch Perfect. The video featured her performing the popular Marathi song "Hi Chal Turu Turu" (sung originally by Jaywant Kulkarni) in the cup song style. Mithila's cup song went viral on YouTube with more than 6 million views. She had previously attempted another version of the cup song, performing "Can't Take My Eyes Off You" and receiving more than 22,000 views. She later sang a song called "Maharashtra Desha" in association with Bharatiya Digital Party (BhaDiPa), which was released on 1 May 2016 on YouTube on the occasion of Maharashtra Day.

Palkar is a celebrity endorser for brands such as Maggi, Tata Tea and Zomato. Forbes India named Palkar in their 30 Under 30 list of young achievers in 2018.

== Filmography ==
=== Films ===
Year	Title	Role	Language	Notes	Ref.
2014	Majha Honeymoon	Rujuta	Marathi	Short film	
2015	Katti Batti	Koyal Kabra	Hindi		
2017	Muramba	Indu	Marathi		
2018	Karwaan	Tanya	Hindi		
2019	Chopsticks	Nirma Sahastrabudhe	Hindi		
2020	A Babysitter's Guide to Monster Hunting	Babysitter from India	English	Cameo appearance; American film	
2021	Tribhanga	Masha	Hindi; English; Marathi	Trilingual film	
2022	Ori Devuda	Anu Paulraj	Telugu		
2025	Sweet Dreams	Dia	Hindi		
2025	Saale Aashiq	Gudia	Hindi	TV movie	
2025	Oho Enthan Baby	Meera	Tamil		
2026	Happy Patel: Khatarnak Jasoos	Rupa	Hindi		
2026	Bhooth Bangla	Meera Acharya	Hindi		
TBA	Ikroop †	TBA	Hindi	Filming	

=== Television ===
Year	Title	Role	Language	Notes	Ref.
2016–2021	Girl in the City	Meera Sehgal	Hindi	3 seasons	
2016–2021	Little Things	Kavya Kulkarni	Hindi	4 seasons	
2016	Official Chukyagiri	Mili	Hindi		
2020	Pretty Fit	Herself	Hindi		
2020	Masaba Masaba	Herself	Hindi	Season 1; cameo appearance	
2026	Super Subbu	Swathi	Telugu		

=== Theatre ===
Year	Title	Group	Ref.
2017	Tunni Ki Kahani	Aarambh	
2017	Aaj Rang Hai	Aarambh	
2018–present	Dekh Behen	Akvarious Productions	

== Awards and nominations ==
Year	Award	Category	Work	Result	Ref.
2017	Filmfare Marathi Awards	Best Female Debut – Marathi	Muramba	Won	
2018	Zee Chitra Gaurav Puraskar	Best Playback Singer – Female	Muramba	Nominated	
2019	IReel Awards	Best Actress - Comedy	Little Things	Won	
2019	Critics' Choice Television Awards	Best Actress in Comedy / Romance	Little Things	Won	
2020	Filmfare OTT Awards	Best Actress - Comedy Series	Little Things	Won	
2021	Filmfare OTT Awards	Best Supporting Actress - Web Originals	Tribhanga	Nominated	
2022	Filmfare OTT Awards	Best Actress - Comedy Series	Little Things	Nominated	
2022	Filmfare OTT Awards	Best Actress Critics - Comedy Series	Little Things	Won	
2022	Indian Film Festival of Melbourne	Best Actress in a Series	Little Things	Nominated	
2023	Bollywood Hungama Style Icons	Most Stylish Digital Entertainer (Female)	—N/a	Nominated	
2023	South Indian International Movie Awards	Best Female Debut – Telugu	Ori Devuda	Nominated	
