= Pyari Behna =

1985 film directed by Bapu

- Promotional Poster
- Directed by: Bapu
- Produced by: B. Loganathan
- Starring: Mithun Chakraborty; Padmini Kolhapure; Vinod Mehra
- Cinematography: Baba Azmi
- Edited by: Anil Malnad
- Music by: Bappi Lahiri
- Release date: 12 July 1985
- Running time: 130 minutes
- Country: India
- Language: Hindi

Pyari Behna (transl. Dear sister) is a 1985 Indian Hindi-language drama film directed by Bapu, starring Mithun Chakraborty, Padmini Kolhapure, Vinod Mehra, Deven Verma, Shakti Kapoor and Tanvi Azmi in her film debut. The film is a remake of the 1978 Tamil film Mullum Malarum.

== Plot ==
Kaali and his sister Seeta live in a shanty house. Kaali is an assistant to Engineer Vinay. Seeta's friend Mangala falls in love with Kali and they get married. When Kali meets with an accident and loses his left hand he blames Vinay for the accident. Vinay has fallen in love with Seeta, but Kaali is against their relationship. How the brother-sister love trumps this resentment forms the rest of the story.

== Cast ==
- Mithun Chakraborty as Kalicharan "Kali"
- Vinod Mehra as Vinay Verma
- Padmini Kolhapure as Mangala
- Tanvi Azmi as Seeta
- Deven Verma as Makhan Singh
- Shakti Kapoor as Nekiram Chaturvedi
- Huma Khan as Banjaran
- Nirmala as Champa
- Meenakshi as Chameli
- Nalini as Bijli
- Asha Shah as Mangala's Mother
- Ajay Devgn (credited as Master Chotu) as young Kali

== Soundtrack ==
The soundtrack was composed by Bappi Lahiri.

| Song | Singer |
|---|---|
| "Baahon Mein" | Kishore Kumar |
| "Jal Gaye Jal Gaye" | Kishore Kumar, Asha Bhosle |
| "Shaadi Ka Matlab" | Kishore Kumar, Asha Bhosle |
| "O Meri Behna" - 1 | S. P. Balasubrahmanyam |
| "O Meri Behna" - 2 | S. P. Balasubrahmanyam |
| "Rakhi Ke Din" | Chandrani Mukherjee |
