= Tanvi Azmi =

Indian television actress

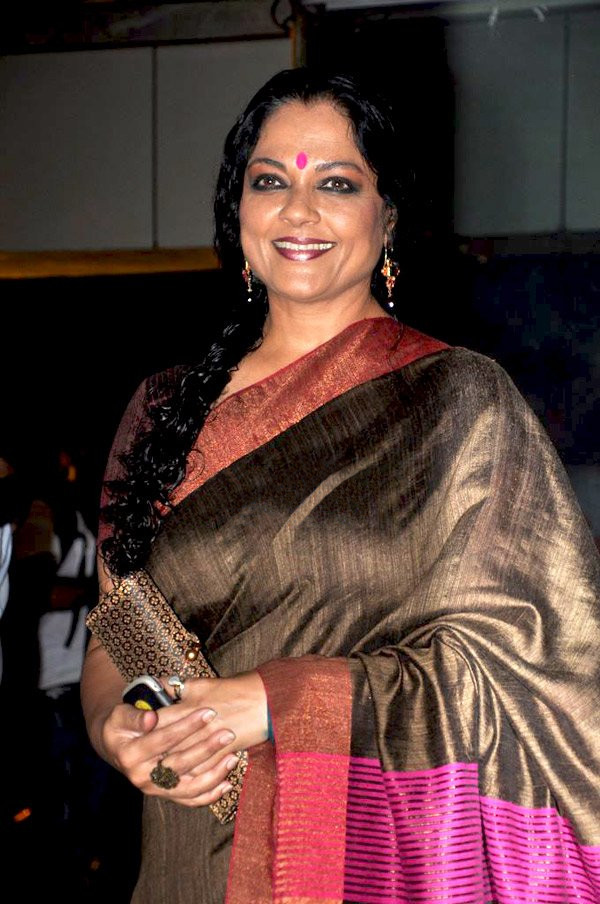
- Azmi at the 2011 Maee Film Bash
- Occupation: Actor
- Years active: 1985–present
- Spouse: Baba Azmi
- Mother: Usha Kiran
- Relatives: Saiyami Kher (niece)

Tanvi Azmi is an Indian film and television actress. She is known for her roles in Akele Hum Akele Tum (1995), Bajirao Mastani (2015), Thappad (2020) and Tribhanga (2021).

== Early life and career ==
She was born to Marathi-Hindi actress Usha Kiran and Manohar Kher.

Azmi portrayed a troubled doctor in the tele-series Jeevanrekha and a young widow in the telefilm Rao Saheb (1986) directed by Vijaya Mehta. She also acted in the Malayalam language film Vidheyan (1993), directed by Adoor Gopalakrishnan.

She received her first nomination for the Filmfare Award for Best Supporting Actress for her performance in the drama Pyari Behna (1985).

Her supporting role in the romantic drama Akele Hum Akele Tum (1995), starring Aamir Khan and Manisha Koirala, received critical acclaim and earned her a second nomination for the Filmfare Award for Best Supporting Actress.

The psychological thriller Dushman (1998), starring Kajol and Sanjay Dutt, in which she played Dr. Poornima Sehgal, a psychologist, earned her a third nomination for the Filmfare Award for Best Supporting Actress.

In 2015, she appeared alongside Ranveer Singh, Deepika Padukone and Priyanka Chopra in Sanjay Leela Bhansali's historical romantic drama Bajirao Mastani. She portrayed Radhabai, the mother of Bajirao I. played by Singh. She had to go bald for her role in the film. The film and her performance received widespread critical acclaim, and earned her a National Film Award for Best Supporting Actress, in addition to her fourth nomination for the Filmfare Award for Best Supporting Actress and her first nomination for the IIFA Award for Best Supporting Actress.

In 2017, she acted in And TV’s Vani Rani.

Her performance in the domestic drama Thappad (2020) received high critical acclaim and earned her a fifth nomination for the Filmfare Award for Best Supporting Actress.

Azmi next starred in Tribhanga (2021), a Netflix original film directed by Renuka Shahane. Co-starring Kajol and Mithila Palkar, the film received critical acclaim for the performance of the lead trio, earning Azmi a nomination for the Filmfare OTT Award for Best Supporting Actress (Web Original Film).

== Personal life ==
Azmi is married to Baba Azmi, cinematographer and brother of Shabana Azmi, thus connected with the Akhtar-Azmi film family.

== Filmography ==
=== Films ===
Film performances
Year	Title	Role	Notes
1985	Pyari Behna	Seeta	
1985	Rao Saheb	Radhika	
1993	Vidheyan	Sarojakka	Malayalam film
1993	Darr	Poonam Awasthi	
1994	English, August	Malti Srivastava	English language film
1995	Akele Hum Akele Tum	Farida	
1998	Dushman	Poornima Sehgal	
2000	Mela	Gopal's mother	
2000	Dhai Akshar Prem Ke	Simran Grewal	
2000	Raja Ko Rani Se Pyar Ho Gaya	Meera Kumar	
2001	Aks	Madhu Pradhan	
2002	11'09"01 September 11	Talat Hamdani	segment "India"
2009	Delhi-6	Fatima	
2009	Pal Pal Dil Ke Ssaat	Makhan Singh	
2010	Anjaana Anjaani	Doctor	
2011	Aarakshan	Mrs. Anand	
2011	Mod	Gayatri Garg	
2011	Bubble Gum	Sudha Rawat	
2013	Aurangzeb	Veera Singh	
2013	Yeh Jawaani Hai Deewani	Bunny's step-mother	
2014	Dekh Tamasha Dekh	Fatima	
2014	Bobby Jasoos	Kausar Khaala	
2014	Lai Bhaari	Sumitra Devi	
2015	Bajirao Mastani	Radhabai	
2017	Guest iin London	Sazia Ghan	
2019	377 AbNormal	Chitra Palgaokar	Zee5 film
2020	Thappad	Sulekha Sabharwal	
2021	Tribhanga	Nayantara Apte	Netflix film
2024	Ole Aale	Dr. Pallavi	Marathi film
2024	Do Patti		Netflix film

=== Television ===
Television performances
Year	Title	Role(s)	Notes
1988	Mirza Ghalib	Umrao Begum	
1991	Kahkashan		
1998-1999	Family No.1	Shalini Potia	
2005	Sinndoor Tere Naam Ka	Kavita Raizada	
2017	Vani Rani	Vani/Raani	Double role
2022	Jugaadistan	Kamala Reddy	
2024	Maamla Legal Hai	Judge Bainsla	
2024	Dil Dosti Dilemma	Naani	

== Awards and nominations ==
Year	Award	Category	Work	Result
Major awards
1986	Filmfare Awards	Best Supporting Actress	Pyari Behna	Nominated
1996	Filmfare Awards	Best Supporting Actress	Akele Hum Akele Tum	Nominated
1999	Filmfare Awards	Best Supporting Actress	Dushman	Nominated
2016	Filmfare Awards	Best Supporting Actress	Bajirao Mastani	Nominated
2021	Filmfare Awards	Best Supporting Actress	Thappad	Nominated
2021	Filmfare OTT Awards	Best Supporting Actress (Web Original Film)	Tribhanga	Nominated
2016	IIFA Awards	Best Supporting Actress	Bajirao Mastani	Nominated
2016	National Film Awards	Best Supporting Actress	Bajirao Mastani	Won
Other awards
2016	FOI Online Awards	Best Supporting Actress	Bajirao Mastani	Won
2016	Producers Guild Film Awards	Best Actor in a Negative Role	Bajirao Mastani	Nominated
2016	Producers Guild Film Awards	Best Actress in a Supporting Role	Bajirao Mastani	Won
2016	Screen Awards	Best Actor in a Negative Role	Bajirao Mastani	Nominated
2016	Times of India Film Awards	Best Supporting Actress	Bajirao Mastani	Nominated
2016	Zee Cine Awards	Best Actor in a Supporting Role – Female	Bajirao Mastani	Nominated
