= Fairy Folk =

- Theatrical release poster
- Directed by: Karan Gour
- Written by: Karan Gour
- Produced by: Annukampa Harsh; Karan Gour; Siddharth Bhatia; Tejash Shah
- Starring: Mukul Chadda; Rasika Dugal; Nikhil Desai
- Cinematography: Abhinay Khoparzi
- Edited by: Karan Gour
- Music by: Karan Gour
- Production companies: Empatheia Films; Bala Wala Cinema; Awe Studios; Timbuktu Films; Triforce Cinemas and Entertainment; Accord Equipment
- Release date: 1 March 2024 (India)
- Running time: 100 minutes
- Country: India
- Language: Hindi

Fairy Folk is a 2024 Hindi-language fantasy drama film written and directed by Karan Gour and produced by Annukampa Harsh, Siddharth Bhatia, Karan Gour, and Tejash Shah. It stars Rasika Dugal and Mukul Chadda. It was screened at several film festivals including the Sydney Film Festival, Chicago International Film Festival and MAMI. It was released in India theatrically on 1 March 2024.

== Cast ==
- Mukul Chadda as Mohit
- Rasika Dugal as Ritika
- Nikhil Desai as a strange being
- Asmit Pathare as Hansa
- Chandrachoor Rai as Kabir
- Ankit Challa as Ankit
- Annukampa Harsh as Ritika 2
- Geetika Vidya Ohlyan as Geet
- Jankee Parekh as Isha
- Alekh Sangal as Maher
- Avinash Verma as Avinash
- Shaan Vyas as Shaan

== Release ==
Fairy Folk was released theatrically on 1 March 2024.

== Reception ==
Saibal Chatterjee of NDTV rated this film four out of five stars and said "Watch Fairy Folk. It is unlike anything you would have seen before." Anuj Kumar of The Hindu said "Fairy Folk begins like an urban fantasy that demands suspension of disbelief but, by the end, you feel like wanting to willingly surrender to its discomforting spell of magic realism that lingers."

Toshiro Agarwal of Times Now said "Karan Gour’s attempt to blend reality with fantasy is truly praiseworthy. The film, despite its evidently limited budget, features really high quality of production and a well-researched script."

Rohit Bhatnagar of The Free Press Journal said "The film raises certain questions about modern-day relationships, people, and their alter egos. Away from big stars and big-budget marketing campaigns, Fairy Folk is a silent and honest film."

Rahul Desai of Film Companion stated in his review that "Evidently, Fairy Folk is a weird film. But it’s a poignant and funny kind of weird. The parables fly thick and fast."

Sreeparna Sengupta of The Times of India said "'Fairy Folk' is worth seeing for its original concept and methodology alone, as much as the impromptu, moving performances."

Mayur Sanap of Rediff.com said "The premise is incredibly wacky and yet simple, and thus, smart writing, direction, and acting are necessary for the film to be convincing. It certainly is, thanks to Gour's skillful hold on the subject matter."
