= Little Things (TV series) =

Indian web TV series

- Genre: Romantic comedy
- Created by: Dhruv Sehgal
- Directed by: Ajay Bhuyan; Ruchir Arun
- Starring: Mithila Palkar; Dhruv Sehgal
- Theme music composer: Prateek Kuhad
- Composer: Neel Adhikari
- Country of origin: India
- Original languages: Hindi; English
- No. of seasons: 4
- No. of episodes: 29

Production
- Executive producers: Aditi Shrivastava; Anirudh Pandita; Ashwin Suresh
- Production location: Mumbai
- Cinematography: Aniruddha Patankar
- Editor: Saumya Sharma
- Running time: 15-40 minutes
- Production company: Dice Media

Original release
- Network: Dice Media (season 1); Netflix (seasons 2–4)
- Release: 25 October 2016 – 15 October 2021

Little Things is an Indian romantic comedy television series, created by Dhruv Sehgal, who also starred in the lead role along with Mithila Palkar. The series were directed by Ajay Bhuyan and Ruchir Arun and produced by Aditi Shrivastava, Anirudh Pandita and Ashwin Suresh of Dice Media. Its first season was premiered through the official YouTube channel of Dice Media, from 25 October 2016, to 22 November. Netflix later purchased the franchise and its second season premiered on 5 October 2018 and its third season on 9 November 2019. Its fourth and the final season was released on 15 October 2021.

== Premise ==
The story revolves around Kavya Kulkarni (Palkar) and Dhruv Vats (Sehgal), a couple in a live-in relationship in Mumbai. The series progresses with everyday life explored through conversation between the couple. The language used is English, with a few sentences in Hindi (used mostly in slang).

== Cast ==
=== Main ===
- Mithila Palkar as Kavya Kulkarni
- Dhruv Sehgal as Dhruv Vats

=== Recurring ===
- Abhishek Bhalerao as Murthy
- Navni Parihar as Ila Kulkarni, Kavya's mother
- Rishi Deshpande as Satish Kulkarni, Kavya's father
- Asheesh Kapur (Season 2 & 3)
- Vikram Kochhar as Dhruv's friend (Season 2 & 3)
- Lovleen Mishra as Dhruv's mother (Season 3)
- Aman Bhagat as Karan (Season 1)
- Veer Rajwant Singh as Akash (Season 1)
- Palvi Jaiswal as Sana (Season 1)
- Sanjay Gurbaxani as Kavya's boss (Season 1)
- Bharat Pahuja as visitor (Season 1)
- Paresh Pahuja as Raunak (Season 2)
- Kanak Raju as coaching teacher (Season 2)
- Priyanka Arya as Sushmita (Season 3)
- Ashish Bhatia as Amey (Season 3)
- Chandrakant as old watchman (Season 3)
- Shikha Chowdary as Anmol (Season 3)
- Dhruvin Doshi as Suraj (Season 3)
- Sainika Ghaises as Nupur (Season 3)
- Martin Jishil as Sandeep (Season 3)
- Aakash Khemchandani as Piyush (Season 3)
- Hitesh Shejpai as Shenoy (Season 3)
- Sarla Shah as Mrs. D'Mello (Season 3)
- Vivaan Shah (Season 3)
- Abhay Verma (Season 3)
- Ayush Sehgal as Omkar (Season 4)
- Tamara as Ishu (Season 4)
- Shiv Tandon as Sanket Lalwani (Season 3 & 4)
- Eisha Chopra as Nandini (Season 2 & 4)

== Episodes ==
Series	Episodes	Originally released		
Series	Episodes	First released	Last released	Network
1	5	25 October 2016	22 November 2016	Dice Media
2	8	5 October 2018		Netflix
3	8	9 November 2019		Netflix
4	8	15 October 2021		Netflix

=== Season 1 (2016) ===
No. overall	No. in season	Title	Directed by	Written by	Original release date
1	1	"FOMO"	Ajay Bhuyan	Dhruv Sehgal	25 October 2016
Dhruv and Kavya are on course to have a lazy plain Sunday even though they try their best to make it exciting. The fear of missing out on all the fun that they see their friends are having on social media makes Kavya spice up their day.
2	2	"Have a Nice Day"	Ajay Bhuyan	Dhruv Sehgal	1 November 2016
The morning rush to go to work leads to a tussle between Dhruv and Kavya, spoiling both their moods for the rest of the day. As the irony of relationships goes, however, they still have each other to help fix a bad day.
3	3	"Good Night"	Ajay Bhuyan	Dhruv Sehgal	8 November 2016
A sleepless night thanks to mosquitoes turns into a discovery that Kavya's ex-boyfriend is getting married, and a long conversation about exes follows.
4	4	"Thank You!"	Ajay Bhuyan	Dhruv Sehgal	15 November 2016
It is a weeknight and Dhruv and Kavya's plan to have a good dinner at an Iranian restaurant gets canned. Kavya convinces Dhruv to attend her friend Shifa's house party and in the end, they end up having a late night out at a nearby fair.
5	5	"Here We Go!"	Ajay Bhuyan	Dhruv Sehgal	22 November 2016
Fresh air and wine do wonders for Dhruv and Kavya as they open up like never before. Nestled in the middle of a vineyard, Kavya speaks her heart out to Dhruv about how she doesn't know what she wants to do with her life.

=== Season 2 (2018) ===
No. overall	No. in season	Title	Directed by	Written by	Original release date
6	1	"Milk Cake"	Ruchir Arun	Dhruv Sehgal	5 October 2018
When an old friend comes to visit from Delhi, Dhruv is struck by how much has changed between them since their childhood.
7	2	"Back Seat"	Ruchir Arun	Dhruv Sehgal	5 October 2018
After Kavya gets a big work promotion and Dhruv makes a difficult professional decision, they attend the housewarming party of a well-to-do couple.
8	3	"Cheeti Aur Haathi"	Ruchir Arun	Dhruv Sehgal	5 October 2018
Kavya gets busier at work while managing a big project. Feeling restless at home, Dhruv struggles to find ways to bring in some income.
9	4	"Mumbai Darshan"	Ruchir Arun	Dhruv Sehgal	5 October 2018
When Kavya's mother comes to visit, Dhruv takes her out for the afternoon and learns more about the person behind the parent.
10	5	"Leicester City F.C."	Ruchir Arun	Dhruv Sehgal	5 October 2018
When Kavya hits it off with another man on a work trip, she begins questioning whether her relationship with Dhruv is good enough for the long haul.
11	6	"Bed & Breakfast"	Ruchir Arun	Dhruv Sehgal	5 October 2018
With Kavya feeling under the weather, weekend plans are cancelled in favour of a day at home, where she and Dhruv chill, chat and occasionally quarrel.
12	7	"Baalti Aur Magga"	Ruchir Arun	Dhruv Sehgal	5 October 2018
While attending a friend's wedding, a moment of intimacy between Kavya and Dhruv devolves into a full-blown argument about where they stand.
13	8	"Where Are We?"	Ruchir Arun	Dhruv Sehgal	5 October 2018
Following their fight, Kavya and Dhruv return home from the wedding, stopping at a familiar place for a heart-to-heart talk.

=== Season 3 (2019) ===
No. overall	No. in season	Title	Directed by	Written by	Original release date
14	1	"Migration"	Sumit Aroraa	Dhruv Sehgal	9 November 2019
A research stint takes Dhruv to Bangalore. As Kavya helps him settle in, unease over their upcoming months apart affects their remaining hours together.
15	2	"Today of all Days"	Sumit Aroraa	Dhruv Sehgal, Garima Pura Patiyaalvi	9 November 2019
Dhruv quickly takes to his new surroundings and makes instant friends. Kavya struggles with loneliness at home and vulnerability at work.
16	3	"Rectangles"	Ruchir Arun	Dhruv Sehgal, Abhinandan Sridhar	9 November 2019
Dhruv and Kavya grow accustomed to their individual lives. As Dhruv's fellowship ends, an awkward conversation stirs unease about his return to Mumbai.
17	4	"Senior Citizens"	Sumit Aroraa	Dhruv Sehgal, Nupur Pai	9 November 2019
While visiting her hometown in Nagpur, Kavya's interactions with her ageing parents and childhood friends spark both concern and nostalgia.
18	5	"Vertical Housing"	Ruchir Arun	Dhruv Sehgal	9 November 2019
Dhruv visits Delhi to help his mother pack up his childhood home, but pressure to marry and family tensions have him feeling frustrated and detached.
19	6	"Jet Lag"	Sumit Aroraa	Dhruv Sehgal	9 November 2019
The couple is finally reunited, but life seems out of sync as Dhruv compares Mumbai to Bangalore and feels replaced by Kavya's new friendships.
20	7	"The Sum of our Past"	Ruchir Arun	Dhruv Sehgal, Garima Pura Patiyaalvi, Abhinandan Sridhar	9 November 2019
Flashbacks illuminate each of Dhruv's and Kavya's early encounters with relationships and marriage. In the present day, a wedding ring triggers tension.
21	8	"Migration II"	Ruchir Arun	Dhruv Sehgal, Nupur Pai	9 November 2019
Dhruv envies a friend's accomplishment. As sad news compels Kavya to consider transferring to Nagpur, the couple reflect on their evolving relationship.

=== Season 4 (2021) ===
No. overall	No. in season	Title	Directed by	Written by	Original release date
22	1	"Circles"	Sumit Aroraa	Dhruv Sehgal	15 October 2021
Reunited after 14 months, Kavya and Dhruv reflect on their time apart, wondering if the physical distance created an emotional disconnection, too.
23	2	"Family Holiday"	Sumit Aroraa	Dhruv Sehgal, Garima Pura Patiyaalvi	15 October 2021
On their Kerala holiday, Kavya talks a reluctant Dhruv into taking a bus tour, but the day trip isn’t without a few bumps in the road.
24	3	"Fort Kavya"	Ruchir Arun	Dhruv Sehgal, Abhinandan Sridhar	15 October 2021
When Dhruv is unable to get out of a work commitment on Kavya’s 30th birthday, she spends the occasion in her own company, exploring and soul-searching.
25	4	"Air Quality Index"	Sumit Aroraa	Dhruv Sehgal, Nupur Pai	15 October 2021
Kavya makes a brave career move. A meetup with Dhruv’s friends from Finland sparks questions about the future and why Dhruv really moved back to India.
26	5	"Business Class"	Ruchir Arun	Dhruv Sehgal	15 October 2021
While setting up their new home in Mumbai, Dhruv and Kavya discuss the pros and cons of marriage. An accident leads to a disappointing setback.
27	6	"Got Your Back"	Sumit Aroraa	Dhruv Sehgal	15 October 2021
With Kavya listless at home and Dhruv struggling at work, three weeks pass before they realize the toll these things have taken on their relationship..
28	7	"What's This Party For?"	Ruchir Arun	Dhruv Sehgal, Garima Pura Patiyaalvi, Abhinandan Sridhar	15 October 2021
While both sets of parents are visiting, Kavya and Dhruv host a gathering at home with friends — but no one is quite sure what the occasion is.
29	8	"Full Circle"	Ruchir Arun	Dhruv Sehgal, Nupur Pai	15 October 2021
In a merry mood, the couple enjoys a late night out, taking a pause to celebrate the present moment as they stand on the cusp of big things to come.

== Production ==
Dhruv Sehgal, started writing for the new series in late 2015, featuring Mithila Palkar who have previously acted in short videos by Dice Media and Filter Copy, and have known each other since Palkar's time working at Thespo (Quasar Theatre Productions' annual theatre festival). Sehgal had asked her to audition for Filter Copy's new satire show on YouTube called News Darshan. The series' first season was directed by Ajay Bhuyan and had an episode runtime of 15 minutes each. The series is produced by Aditi Shrivastava, Anirudh Pandita and Ashwin Suresh. The second and third season was directed by Ruchir Arun, who is a National Award winner.

== Themes ==
The series explores multiple themes, related to everyday life and the problems and challenges faced in it. Season 1 explored themes like a fear of missing out (FOMO) caused by social media and late-night cravings for food. Season 2 explored more serious themes like personal and professional crises. Dhruv is seen reconnecting with an old friend and realising that they have grown apart. He is later seen quitting his job due to a loss of interest. Dhruv is then seen as being "aimless" while Kavya has received a promotion and a pay hike, which leads to fights as they realise the differences between them. Other themes explored in the second season include Kavya getting attracted to a biker on an office trip, homophobia and the possibility of considering one's parents as friends.

Season 3 further explores Dhruv and Kavya's relationship (which had hit a rough patch at the end of Season 2) with them venturing into a long-distance relationship. They thus begin to face loneliness (due to staying apart from one another) and learn to deal with it. They eventually realize that they can also be happy with other people. The two of them also have additional responsibilities and pity themselves. They reconnect with childhood friends and Kavya faces the fear of losing a loved one, her neighbour's dog, Kaju. They both discuss the possibility of marriage and their views on the topic are explored through an episode consisting of flashbacks. While visiting their parents, they realize that they are growing old. Additionally, the season explores the social structures of the big cities, commenting on how the urbanisation results in a loss of humanity.

== Soundtrack ==
The music and background score is composed by Neel Adhikari, and the series features a theme song composed by Prateek Kuhad specially for it.

Season 1

- "Song for Survival" - Neel Adhikari, Mithila Palkar
- "Food for Thought" - Neel Adhikari
- "Hot or Cold Down There" - Neel Adhikari
- "Luca's Lullaby" - Neel Adhikari
- "Mountaintop Two" - Neel Adhikari
- "Pots N' Pans" - Neel Adhikari, Clovis Soo
- "RocknRolla" - Neel Adhikari

Season 2

- "Musalsal" - Neel Adhikari
- "I Forgive You" - Neel Adhikari
- "Surprise" - Neel Adhikari
- "Okay" - Neel Adhikari
- "Parchai" - Neel Adhikari

== Release ==
The first season of the series was premiered through Dice Media's YouTube channel, from 25 October 2016 to 22 November 2016. It became a thundering success, with the first episode, which premiered on 25 October, gained over 15 million views, upon its initial release. Later, Netflix collaborated with Dice Media, to acquire the rights for the second season, which was released on 5 October 2018. Netflix announced that the show would be renewed for a third season, with a release date of 9 November 2019.

== Reception ==
Rohan Naahar of Hindustan Times gave it a rating of 4/5 and went on to write "[The show] relies more heavily on performances than most others". Soumya Rao, writing for Scroll.in, called the show "frequently charming, often relatable and never boring". Prakhya Nair of The Red Sparrow rated it 3.5 stars and recommended it to "anyone who wants to delve in a real relationship for a while". Anvita Singh, writing for The Indian Express, opines that "[The show] would have worked better if it had four episodes of 15 minutes each, instead of the eight episodes, each over 22 minutes long" and also critiqued that the second season lacked the show's "sweet-natured relatability".

== Other media ==
Season 1 of the series was published as a book by Penguin Random House in August 2017. A 20-episode prequel audio series Little Things: Jab Dhruv Met Kavya narrated by Sehgal and Palkar was released on Audible in September 2022.

== Awards ==
Award	Category	Recipient	Result	Ref
MTV IWMBuzz Digital Awards 2019	Most Popular Actress in a Web Series	Mithila Palkar	Won	
MTV IWMBuzz Digital Awards 2019	Best Cinematography	Aniruddha Patankar	Won	
MTV IWMBuzz Digital Awards 2019	Storyteller of The Year	Dhruv Sehgal	Won	
MTV IWMBuzz Digital Awards 2019	Best Youth Show	Little Things 2	Won	
IReel Awards 2019	Best Actor in Comedy Series	Dhruv Sehgal	Nominated	
IReel Awards 2019	Best Actress in Comedy Series	Mithila Palkar	Won	
IReel Awards 2019	Best Comedy Series	Little Things 2	Won	
Critics Choice Shorts & Series Awards 2019	Best Writing Series (Comedy/ Romance)	Dhruv Sehgal	Won	
Critics Choice Shorts & Series Awards 2019	Best Actor in Comedy/ Romance	Dhruv Sehgal (share with Vikrant Massey)	Won	
Critics Choice Shorts & Series Awards 2019	Best Actress in Comedy/ Romance	Mithila Palkar	Won	
Critics Choice Shorts & Series Awards 2019	Best Series (Comedy/ Romance)	Little Things Season 2	Won	
2020 Filmfare OTT Awards	Best Comedy Series	Little Things 3	Nominated	
2020 Filmfare OTT Awards	Best Actor in Comedy Series	Dhruv Sehgal	Nominated	
2020 Filmfare OTT Awards	Best Actress in Comedy Series	Mithila Palkar	Won	
2020 Filmfare OTT Awards	Critics Best Actor in Comedy Series	Dhruv Sehgal	Won	
