= TVF Tripling =

Indian web series

- Promotional poster for TVF Tripling: Season 2
- Genre: Drama
- Developed by: Sameer Saxena
- Written by: Akarsh Khurana; Sumeet Vyas
- Directed by: Rajesh A Krishnan; Sameer Saxena; Neeraj Udhwani
- Starring: Sumeet Vyas; Maanvi Gagroo; Amol Parashar
- Composer: Amar Mangrulkar
- Country of origin: India
- Original language: Hindi
- No. of seasons: 3
- No. of episodes: 15

Production
- Producer: Arunabh Kumar
- Cinematography: G. Srinivas Reddy
- Editors: Anand Subaya; Tamojit Das
- Running time: 21 minutes
- Production company: The Viral Fever Media Labs

Original release
- Network: TVFPlay; YouTube
- Release: 28 August – 7 October 2016
- Network: SonyLIV
- Release: 5 April 2019
- Network: ZEE5
- Release: 21 October 2022

TVF Tripling is an Indian Hindi-language web series created by The Viral Fever. It was developed by Sameer Saxena and written by Akarsh Khurana and Sumeet Vyas. The series star Vyas, Maanvi Gagroo and Amol Parashar in lead roles, along with Kunaal Roy Kapur, Nidhi Bisht, Kumud Mishra, and Shernaz Patel. It traces the story of three siblings, who together start a hilarious journey to find themselves and their relations. The first season has music and background score composed by Amar Mangrulkar, with cinematography and editing done by G. Srinivas Reddy, Anand Subbaiya and Tamojit Das respectively.

TVF Tripling: Season 1 was premiered simultaneously in the company's media streaming platform TVF Play and in YouTube, from 28 August 2016 to 7 October, with five consecutive episodes were aired every week. The show received positive response from audience and along with some other contributions, the series has won several awards, including the Asian Television Award. It was recognised as one of the best web-series of 2016 and also a benchmark of success in Indian branded content and has since developed a cult status.

Following the success of TVF Tripling, the makers renewed for a second season with Sameer Saxena directing the series, and retaining the same technical crew, with the exception of music composer Mangrulkar, who worked in the first season, as he was replaced by Nilotpal Bora, whereas the cinematographer and editors were same. The series aired through Sony Liv on 5 April 2019, and unlike that of the first season, it received mixed reviews from critics.

The show was renewed for a third season in 2021 and moved to ZEE5 as the streaming platform. The third season premiered on October 21, 2022. The season is written by Sumeet Vyas and directed by Neeraj Udhwani. In this season the three siblings find out that their parents are getting a divorce. It received positive reviews from critics.

== Cast ==
Character	Portrayed by	Description	Appearances		
Character	Portrayed by	Description	Season 1	Season 2	Season 3
Chandan Sharma	Sumeet Vyas	Chinmay and Charu's elder son, Chanchal and Chitvan's elder brother	Main	Main	Main
Chanchal Sharma	Maanvi Gagroo	Chinmay and Charu's daughter, Chandan and Chitvan's sister, Pranav's wife	Main	Main	Main
Chitvan Sharma	Amol Parashar	Chinmay and Charu's younger son, Chandan and Chanchal's younger brother, Sheetal's boyfriend	Main	Main	Main
Pranav	Kunaal Roy Kapur	Chanchal's husband, Nirmala's brother-in-law	Recurring	Recurring	Recurring
Nirmala	Nidhi Bisht	Pranav's sister-in-law	Recurring	Recurring	
Chinmay Sharma	Kumud Mishra	Charu's husband, Chandan, Chanchal and Chitvan's father	Recurring	Recurring	Main
Charu Sharma	Shernaz Patel	Chinmay's wife, Chandan, Chanchal and Chitvan's mother	Recurring	Recurring	Main
Nawab Sikandar Khan	Gajraj Rao	Zainab's husband		Recurring	
Begum Zainab	Shweta Tripathi	Sikandar Khan's wife		Recurring	
Sheetal	Kubbra Sait	Chitvan's girlfriend, Cheetah's mother		Recurring	
Hari Bhai	Mushtaq Khan	—N/a		Recurring	
Payal	Mahnaz Damania	—N/a	Recurring		
Shoshana	Kallirroi Tziafeta	Chinmay and Charu's tenant	Recurring		
Detective Byomkesh Bakshi Satyanweshi	Rajit Kapoor	Detective in Pranav's missing case		Recurring	
Himself	Jitendra Kumar	Onscreen Chitvan in the film		Recurring	

== Series overview ==
Season	No. of episodes	Originally broadcast (India)	
Season	No. of episodes	First aired	Last aired
1	5	28 August 2016	7 October 2016
2	5	5 April 2019	
3	5	21 October 2022	

== Episodes ==
=== Season 1 ===
No.	Title	Directed by	Written by	Original release date
1	"Toh Chalein"	Rajesh Krishnan	Sumeet Vyas, Akash Khurana	28 August 2016
Chandan, recently divorced, returns to Mumbai to meet his brother, Chitvan, a DJ. Chitvan, running from debt collectors, drags him to Jodhpur, to meet their sister, Chanchal, who is married into a royal family and pregnant.
2	"Ab Kidhar?"	Rajesh Krishnan	Sumeet Vyas, Akash Khurana	14 September 2016
Chanchal reveals to her siblings that she is not actually pregnant. Following the fight between the siblings and Chanchal's husband, Pranav, they unceremoniously leave the palace.
3	"Right, Left Ya Seedha?"	Rajesh Krishnan	Sumeet Vyas, Akash Khurana	21 September 2016
Chandan, Chanchal and Chitvan leave Jodhpur to hit the road. On their journey they find themselves lost in the desert. They meet a group of Israeli girls who steal their car.
4	"Aage Tiraaha Hai"	Rajesh Krishnan	Sumeet Vyas, Akash Khurana	30 September 2016
On the road to find their stolen car, the siblings reach Bathinda, where they fight with the local car stealer and manage to reclaim their car with the help from Pranav.
5	"Pahunch Gaye Kya?"	Rajesh Krishnan	Sumeet Vyas, Akash Khurana	7 October 2016
The siblings reach their parents’ home in Manali to find surprises.

=== Season 2 ===
No.	Title	Directed by	Written by	Original release date
1	"Mada Faka"	Sameer Saxena	Sumeet Vyas, Akarsh Khurana	5 April 2019
Time flies! Chandan is now the author of the bestselling book Tripling. Chitvan is the star of the book & excited about the book being adapted into a movie. But seems like Chanchal doesn't feel the same way and being exasperated with Chandan, tortures them.
2	"Phir Se Tripling"	Sameer Saxena	Sumeet Vyas, Akarsh Khurana	5 April 2019
The trio is back together and have hit the road. Chandan, being annoyed and Chitvan, unapologetic tries to help Chanchal find her husband Pranav who is missing and saving her from the police and media.
3	"Kabootar Ja Ja Ja"	Sameer Saxena	Sumeet Vyas, Akarsh Khurana	5 April 2019
Chanchal, Chandan and Chitvan are now on a road trip with a purpose to find Pranav's whereabouts. They happen to meet Prince Alexander and his gorgeous Begum Zainab.
4	"Bandhu Re"	Sameer Saxena	Sumeet Vyas, Akarsh Khurana	5 April 2019
The siblings have managed to thread the clues and connect some dots to reach Kolkata. They meet a Samaritan detective who sent them to Sikkim.
5	"Rasta Jahaan Le Chale"	Sameer Saxena	Sumeet Vyas, Akarsh Khurana	5 April 2019
It's always about the journey. The destination only makes it sweeter.

=== Season 3 ===
No.	Title	Directed by	Written by	Original release date
1	"Back Home"	Neeraj Udhwani	Sumeet Vyas	October 21, 2022
The siblings find out that the parents are separating. The more they try to understand this, the more mysterious it gets. The parents are happy and yet separating. The last shock hits them when they get to know that their childhood home is being sold.
2	"Raaita Fail Gaya"	Neeraj Udhwani	Sumeet Vyas	October 21, 2022
The family organizes a brunch, but it is ruined when a young woman comes to house and announces her plans for changing the house in a hotel. It all turns to extreme chaos with arrival of Pranav.
3	"Ghar Hai Wahi"	Neeraj Udhwani	Sumeet Vyas	October 21, 2022
The family finds itself at a crazy party in the hills. drunk and confused they have to rush back home when they get to know that the cousin of Pranav has arrived and challenged him to duel till death.
4	"Happily Married"	Neeraj Udhwani	Sumeet Vyas	October 21, 2022
The siblings plan a trek as a last resort to solve the issue of parents’ separation. Everything goes wrong from the word Go.
5	"Jude Hai Hum"	Neeraj Udhwani	Sumeet Vyas	October 21, 2022
Heart broken, the siblings try to accept the inevitable separation of parents but they decided to save the home.

== Soundtrack ==
For the soundtrack album of TVF Tripling: Season 1, Rajesh Krishnan chose Amar Mangrulkar, who earlier composed background music for the 2014 film Hasee Toh Phasee to work on the series. This marked Mangrulkar's maiden collaboration with The Viral Fever, as the company previously collaborated with Vaibhav Bundhoo for Permanent Roommates and TVF Pitchers. The soundtrack album consists of 13 songs which was composed, produced and programmed by Mangrulkar, who also wrote lyrics for the songs along with the series' director Krishnan, Kapil Sawant, Vaibhav Modi, Rajnigandha Shekhawat and Jaspreet Jasz. It also features a traditional folk song "Kesariya Balam" which is based on Rajasthani music and "Amma Puchchadi" which is originated from Himachali music.

For the second season of TVF Tripling, The Viral Fever associated with Sony Music India in their maiden collaboration, and Mangrulkar was eventually replaced by Nilotpal Bora as the composer. The eight-song soundtrack has lyrics written by Hussain Haidry, Rahul Dey Das and Varun Likhate. Arup Jyoti Barua composed one song "Mon Chole Re" based on a poem written by Rahul Dey Das, which had two versions in the original soundtrack album. Bora recreated the song "Mada Faqa" from the first season composed by Mangrulkar and titled it as "Mada Faqa 2.0". The song had rap versions crooned, written and additionally composed by Varun Likhate.

=== Track listing ===
TVF Tripling: Season 1

Soundtrack album by Amar Mangrulkar
- Released: 10 October 2016
- Recorded: 2016
- Genre: Soundtrack
- Length: 31:51
- Label: The Viral Fever
- Producer: Amar Mangrulkar

TVF Tripling: Season 1 (Music from the Original Series)
No.	Title	Lyrics	Singer(s)	Length
1.	"Mada Faqa"	Kapil Sawant, Amar Mangrulkar	Amar Mangrulkar, Shaaze Merchant	1:59
2.	"Kesariya Balam"	Traditional	Vijay Prakash, Mahati Vijay Prakash	2:44
3.	"The Gone Gone Song"	Rajnigandha Shekhawat, Amar Mangrulkar	Surya Raguunathan, Rajnigandha Shekhawat, Amar Mangrulkar	2:42
4.	"Mera Sapna"	Kapil Sawant	Vivek Hariharan	3:34
5.	"Rascals"	Rajesh Krishnan	Rajesh Krishnan, Hamsika Iyer, SHaaze Merchant, Amar Mangrulkar	2:06
6.	"Baambu"	Kapil Sawant	Rajesh Krishnan	1:48
7.	"Amma Puchchadi"	Traditional	Vivek Hariharan	2:51
8.	"Jee Le Zindagi"	Kapil Sawant	Shaaze Merchant	1:45
9.	"Albela Ghoda"	Kapil Sawant	Amar Mangrulkar, Shaaze Merchant, Supati Ranjan	1:40
10.	"Ni Mannja"	Jaspreet Jasz	Jaspreet Jasz	2:28
11.	"Going Home"	Amar Mangrulkar	Shaaze Merchant	2:35
12.	"Paheliyan"	Vaibhav Modi	Paroma Dasgupta	3:54
13.	"Tripling Theme"	–	Instrumental	1:45
Total length:				31:51

TVF Tripling: Season 2

Soundtrack album by Nilotpal Bora
- Released: 19 April 2019
- Recorded: 2018–2019
- Genre: Soundtrack
- Length: 27:55
- Labels: The Viral Fever; Sony Music India
- Producer: Nilotpal Bora

TVF Tripling: Season 2 (Music from the Original Series)
No.	Title	Lyrics	Singer(s)	Length
1.	"Rasta Jahaan Le Chale"	Hussain Haidry	Papon	3:05
2.	"Tu Kahaan Hai"	Hussain Haidry	Zubeen Garg	3:39
3.	"Phans Gayo"	Hussain Haidry	Swaroop Khan	2:28
4.	"Ishq Ka Hafiz"	Hussain Haidry	Nilotpal Bora	3:54
5.	"Patang"	Hussain Haidry	Nilotpal Bora	4:45
6.	"Mon Chole Re"	Rahul Dey Das	Arup Jyoti Baruah	4:13
7.	"Mada Faka 2.0"	Varun Likhate, Amar Mangrulkar, Kapil Sawant	Varun Likhate, Sampriti Goswami, Ritrisha Sharma, Madhusmita Borthakur, Nilotpal Bora	1:39
8.	"Mon Chole Re" (Baul Rock Version)	Rahul Dey Das	Arup Jyoti Baruah	4:12
Total length:				27:55

== Release ==
The Viral Fever released the first trailer of the series on 25 August 2016. As a part of the promotional purpose, TVF partnered with Tata Motors for the project to promote the newly launched Tata Tiago. The first season of TVF Tripling was scheduled to be released on 28 August 2016, with its first episode being released simultaneously through TVF's media streaming platform TVF Play, and also through its official YouTube channel. The season finale premiered on 7 October.

Following the success of the first season, The Viral Fever renewed for a second season of TVF Tripling, with the teaser and trailer eventually released on 7 and 15 March 2019, respectively. The digital rights of the second season was sold to SonyLIV and the series was released on 5 April 2019.

For the third season, the series moved to ZEE5. The teaser for the season was released on 3 October 2022.

== Accolades ==
Year	Award	Category	Recipient(s)	Result	Ref.
2017	Asian Television Awards	Best Scriptwriting - Web series	Sumeet Vyas & Akarsh Khurana	Won	
2019	IReel Awards	Best Actor (Comedy)	Amol Parashar	Won	
2019	IReel Awards	Best Actress (Comedy)	Maanvi Gagroo	Nominated	
2019	IReel Awards	Best Comedy Series	Tripling 2	Nominated	
2019	IReel Awards	Best Writing (Comedy)	Sumeet Vyas & Akarsh Khurana	Nominated	
2023	Filmfare OTT Awards	Best Series - Comedy	Tripling 3	Nominated	
2023	Filmfare OTT Awards	Best Actor - Comedy	Amol Parashar	Nominated	
2023	Filmfare OTT Awards	Best Actress - Comedy	Maanvi Gagroo	Won	
2023	Filmfare OTT Awards	Best Supporting Actor - Comedy	Kumud Mishra	Nominated	
2023	Filmfare OTT Awards	Best Supporting Actress - Comedy	Shernaz Patel	Won	
