= Ishita Moitra =

Indian screenwriter

- Born: 8 August 1983 (age 43); Bareilly, Uttar Pradesh, India
- Occupation: Screenwriter
- Spouse: Neeraj Udhwani (m. 2016)

Ishita Moitra is an Indian screenwriter who works in Hindi films. She has written films such as Half Girlfriend (2017), Rocky Aur Rani Kii Prem Kahaani (2023), Bad Newz (2024) and Sunny Sanskari Ki Tulsi Kumari (2025). In 2026, she was included in the Forbes India W-Power list of self-made women."W-Power 2026". Forbes India. 2026.

== Filmography ==
=== Film ===
Year	Title	Screenplay	Dialogues	Notes
2009	Kambakkht Ishq	Yes	No	
2011	Always Kabhi Kabhi	Yes	Yes	
2013	Mere Dad Ki Maruti	No	Yes	
2014	Ragini MMS 2	No	Yes	
2017	Noor	No	Yes	
2017	Half Girlfriend	No	Yes	
2017	Bank Chor	Yes	Yes	
2020	Shakuntala Devi	No	Yes	
2023	Rocky Aur Rani Kii Prem Kahaani	Yes	Yes	
2024	Bad Newz	Yes	Yes	
2025	Nadaaniyan	Yes	Yes	
2025	Sunny Sanskari Ki Tulsi Kumari	Yes	Yes	
2026	Alpha	No	Yes	

=== Television ===
- Dekha Ek Khwaab (2011–2012)
- Bade Achhe Lagte Hain (2011–2014)
- Khotey Sikkey (2011)
- Ajeeb Daastaan Hai Ye (2014–2015)
- Bepannaah (2018)

=== Web series ===
- The Test Case (2017–2018)
- Four More Shots Please! (2019–present)
- Call Me Bae (2024)
- Single Papa (2025)

== Awards and nominations ==
Year	Award	Category	Result	Ref.
2024	Filmfare Awards	Best Screenplay	Nominated	
2024	Filmfare Awards	Best Story	Nominated	
2024	Filmfare Awards	Best Dialogue	Won	
2024	IIFA Awards	Best Dialogue	Won	
