= ZS Associates =

American management consulting firm

ZS

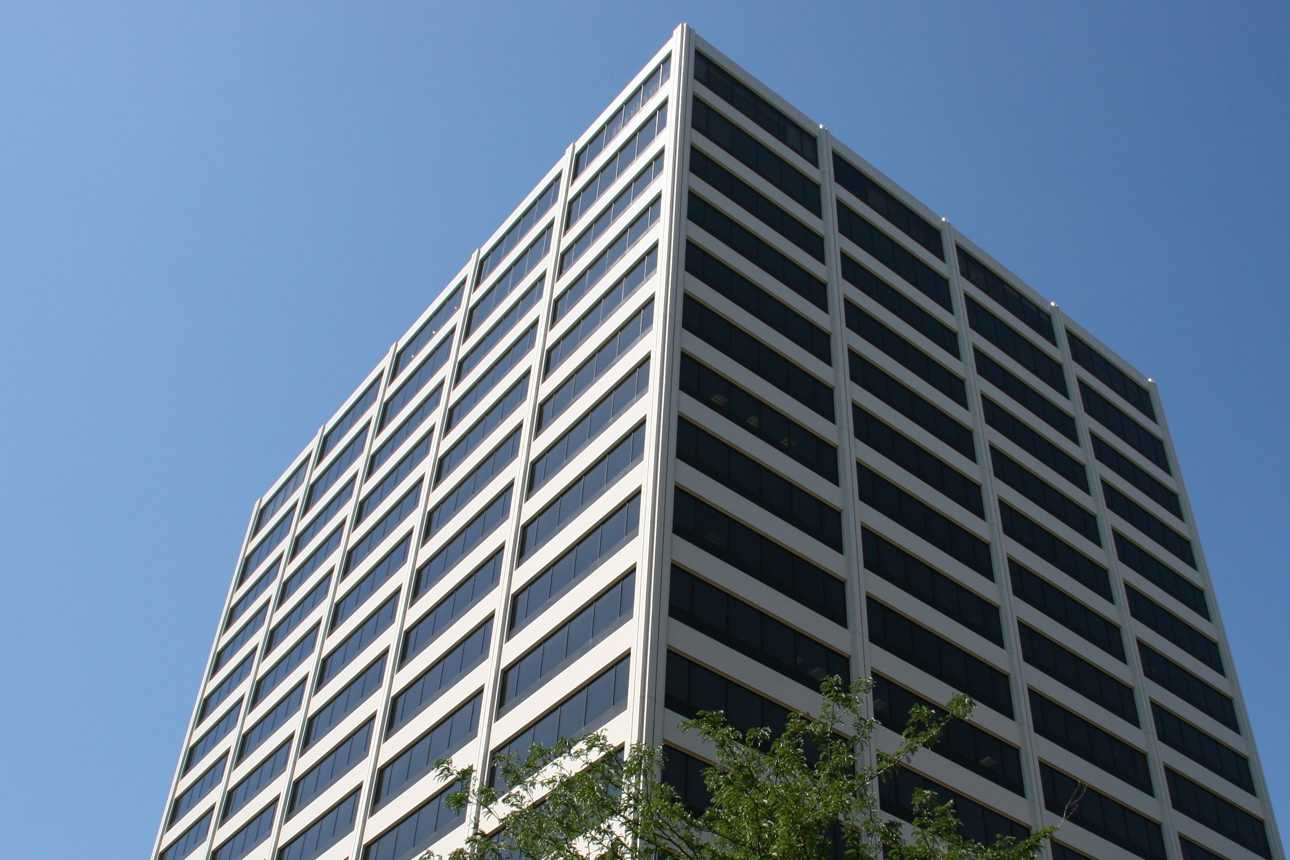
- Headquarters in Evanston, Illinois, United States
- Type: Private
- Industry: Consulting, Analytics, AI
- Founded: 1983; 43 years ago
- Headquarters: Evanston, Illinois
- Area served: Worldwide
- Key people: Pratap Khedkar (CEO) Prabhakant Sinha (Co-Founder) Andris Zoltners (Co-Founder)
- Number of employees: 13000
- Website: www.zs.com

ZS Associates is a management consulting and professional services firm focusing on consulting, software, and technology. Headquartered in Evanston, Illinois, it provides healthcare, private equity, and technology services. The firm was founded in 1983 by two professors at Northwestern University who developed sales force alignment models using the world's first personal-computer-aided territory mapping system.

The firm employs more than 13,000 employees in 35 offices in North America, South America, Europe and Asia.

The company was chosen by Forbes magazine as one of America's best management and consulting firms in 2019 and has been awarded for its company culture by Consulting magazine for several years in a row. The Human Rights Campaign Foundation has also been recognized the company for earning 100 percent on their Annual Corporate Equality Index for LGBTQ workplace equality.

== History ==
ZS Associates was founded in 1983 by Andris (Andy) Zoltners, Frederic Esser Nemmers, Distinguished Professor Emeritus of Marketing at the Kellogg School of Management, and Prabhakant (Prabha) Sinha, a former associate professor of marketing at the Kellogg School of Management. At Kellogg, Sinha and Zoltners developed a side business advising companies on sales and marketing, which evolved into ZS Associates.

In 1982, Zoltners and Sinha presented their sales force sizing and territory alignment models to their academic colleagues, demonstrating the world's first personal-computer-aided territory mapping system. In 1983, Sinha joined Zoltners at Northwestern, and the pair founded ZS Associates in their off hours, offering companies increased sales force efficiency using their now-proven territory mapping software. In its first three years, ZS had helped eight of the 10 largest pharmaceutical companies in the world, including Pfizer, align territories and resize their sales forces. By that time, the 25-member team worked on 100 or more projects in a dozen countries—including the United States, Canada and many European countries.

Through the 1990s, ZS continued to develop its capabilities, adding data warehousing, market forecasting, market research and analytical services for their clients. The firm also began sales force incentive compensation program auditing, design and implementation during these years.

== Acquisitions ==
ZS purchased the assets of BASES Pharmaceuticals Forecasting from Nielsen. In 2021, ZS acquired Medullan. In 2022, ZS acquired Intomics. In 2023, ZS acquired Trials.ai. In 2024, ZS acquired Digital Additive. In 2025, ZS acquired Torrent Consulting.

== Industries ==
ZS operates as a strategic, long-term advisor to its clients, in the following incomplete list of industries:

- Pharmaceuticals and Biotech
- Healthcare
- Medical Technology
- Health Plans
- Travel and Hospitality
- Industrials and Business Services
- High-Tech and Telecommunications
- Financial Services
- Private Equity
