= Times of Music =

Indian Reality Show

Times of Music is an Indian Hindi-Language reality show and MX Player original series created and developed by K G Ramnarayan and Vaibhav Modi and produced by Victor Tango Entertainment Pvt. Ltd. And Wobble Creative & Content LLP.

The concept of the show was to get Indian Music Directors together and paired to recreate each other's songs, with due credit and acknowledgement.

The show was hosted by music director Vishal Dadlani. It was released on MX Player on 20 June 2020; each weekend airing 2-3 episodes.

The theme song 'Sajda Karoon' was composed by Papon, written by Vaibhav Modi and the video shows a montage of all the music composers involved in the show performing the song.

Reviews of the show were positive from both fans and critics.

== Composers ==
The 20 composers paired episode-wise are as follows:

- Pyarelal Sharma (Laxmikant–Pyarelal) and Salim–Sulaiman
- Viju Shah and Mithoon
- Anandji Shah (Kalyanji-Anandji) and Ajay–Atul
- Bappi Lahiri and Vishal–Shekhar
- Anand–Milind and Sajid–Wajid
- Euphoria (Palash Sen) and Sachin–Jigar
- Agnee and Amit Trivedi **
- Shantanu Moitra and Amaal Mallik
- Indian Ocean and Sneha Khanwalkar
- Rajesh Roshan and Himesh Reshammiya

** the two episodes featuring these composers were tribute to composers Jaidev, S.D Burman and R.D Burman. Agnee or Amit Trivedi did not recreate each other's songs.
