= Chopsticks (film) =

Indian Hindi-language comedy drama on Netflix

- Poster
- Directed by: Sachin Yardi
- Written by: Sachin Yardi
- Produced by: Ashvini Yardi
- Starring: Abhay Deol; Mithila Palkar; Vijay Raaz
- Cinematography: Kedar Gaekwad
- Edited by: Unnikrishnan P. P
- Music by: Score: Pradeep Mukhopadhyay
- Production company: Viniyard Productions
- Distributed by: Netflix
- Release date: 31 May 2019
- Running time: 100 minutes
- Country: India
- Languages: English; Hindi

Chopsticks is an Indian Hindi-language comedy drama film directed by Sachin Yardi and produced by Ashvini Yardi. It stars Abhay Deol and Mithila Palkar in the lead roles. The film is a story of a woman who is referred to an enigmatic con man who agrees to help recover her stolen car from a thug for free, and how it brings about change in their lives. It was released on 31 May 2019 worldwide on Netflix.

== Plot ==
Nirma Sahastrabuddhe (Mithila Palkar), naive and unconfident, is a Mandarin translator who works at a travel agency. She wants to move up in her job, but her boss thinks she is too incompetent and hesitant for any job besides being a tour guide at Dharavi. One day she buys her own car and is very excited about it. On the very same night, her car gets stolen. She reports the theft to cops, but they don't help her. She meets a newly arrested thief, who tells her that those useless police will never find her car. He also lets her know that she has to find the car within three days, or her car will either be transported out of the city or be taken apart for spare parts. He suggests that she visit a man called “Artist” for help, a legendary conman.

She meets Artist (Abhay Deol) the next day, a conman who can break any lock, but who is also passionate about cooking. Artist agrees to help her. Using his broad connections, he easily finds the whereabouts of the car. Nirma and Artist form a bond of comradeship, and Artist is charmed by Nirma's naive nature. Artist also teaches her an important life motto: there is always another option.

Unfortunately, when Nirma and Artist arrive to collect her car, they find it has already been taken apart, leaving Nirma heartbroken. However, they later find out that the thief had lied to them and given them the wrong information. Nirma's car was not destroyed, but with a gangster called Faiyaz Bhai (Vijay Raaz).

Nirma goes to the police to inform them, but the police refuse to take action. Nirma tells Artist they have to bring back the car themselves, but Artist does not want to entangle himself or Nirma with a gangster. Eventually, Nirma manages to persuade him, showing how she has gained more confidence over the course of their journey.

Faiyaz Bhai has a pet goat named Bahubali whom he loves and cherishes. Nirma and Artist come up with the idea of kidnapping Bahubali. They want to use Bahubali as a bargaining chip so he would return her car in exchange for Bahubali. They later successfully carry out the plan.

However, Faiyaz Bhai quickly finds out Artist and Nirma's whereabouts. Artist also learns they have been exposed, so he and Nirma run from Faiyaz Bhai's men. Later, Nirma willingly returns Bahubali to Faiyaz Bhai and apologizes to him. She says she just wanted to make Faiyaz Bhai realize how much it hurts when something you love gets stolen; but she herself realized it was wrong to kidnap Bahubali as he is not an object, but Faiyaz Bhai's child. Faiyaz Bhai is moved by Nirma's statement and returns Nirma's car to her. He also decides to stop Bahubali from doing animal fights as a form of betting.

In the post credit scenes, Nirma is shown as a more confident and lively person. Even her boss is impressed with her. On the other hand, Artist is now competing as a startup chef in a cooking competition show.

== Cast ==
- Abhay Deol as Artist, a con man and a chef
- Mithila Palkar as Nirma Sahastrabuddhe, a Mandarin translator
- Abhishek Bhalerao as Siddhivinayak Cop
- Vijay Raaz as Faiyaz Bhai
- Benafsha Soonawalla as Ananya
- Achint Kaur as Zacharia
- Narendra Khatri as Farooq, a caterer
- Arun Kushwath as Udan Khatola aka UK, the head of beggars
- Abhilash Joshi as Wifi Guy

== Marketing and release ==
A teaser of the film was released in the first week of May. It introduced the protagonist of the film. The trailer was released later in May by Netflix. Cast by Paragg Mehta.

== Reception ==
Rohan Naahar of the Hindustan Times rates the film with two out of five stars. He feels it has muddled story which is low on comedy, and writes, "Like the inconvenient cutlery it is named after, there’s little reason to try it if there are alternatives to be found." Shrishti Negi of the News18 also rates the film with two out of five stars and opines that the film never rose to its true potential. Anupama Chopra of Film Companion opines that the humour inherent in a sitcom has not come out as the film scenes are preposterous. Akash of High On Films wrote, "Despite having so much talent in the acting department, the script hardly seems to have any direction or a sense of purpose."
