= Neeraj Udhwani =

Indian screenwriter

- Born: Mumbai, Maharashtra, India
- Occupations: Screenwriter, film director
- Years active: 2006–present
- Notable work: Maska (2020 film), Dil Toh Baccha Hai Ji, TVF Tripling
- Spouse: Ishita Moitra (m. 2016)

Neeraj Udhwani is an Indian screenwriter and film director.

== Career ==
In 2006, Udhwani started his career as a writer for The Great Indian Comedy Show for Star Plus. In 2011, he wrote his first film Dil Toh Baccha Hai Ji and later in 2013, he wrote the screenplay and story of Mere Dad Ki Maruti. His work in television involves Webbed for Mtv, Yeh hai Aashiqui for BBC, and Gumrah for Channel V. He also wrote Inside Edge for Prime Video and Home for ALT Balaji in digital platforms.

Udhwani directed Maska as his debut film, which released on Netflix on 27 March 2020. He also directed the web series TVF Tripling. In 2025, Udhwani co-created and co-produced the Netflix comedy-drama series Single Papa with Ishita Moitra, and served as one of its directors.

== Personal life ==
Udhwani resides in Mumbai. He is married to scriptwriter Ishita Moitra.
