= The Office (Indian TV series) =

Indian TV series

- Official poster
- Genre: Sitcom; Mockumentary; Cringe comedy
- Created by: Rajesh Devraj
- Based on: The Office by: Ricky Gervais; Stephen Merchant; and; The Office (American TV series)
- Directed by: Rohan Sippy; Debbie Rao; Bumpy
- Starring: Mukul Chadda; Gopal Datt; Sayandeep Sengupta; Samridhi Dewan; Abhinav Sharma; Gauahar Khan; Gavin Methalaka
- Country of origin: India
- Original language: Hindi
- No. of seasons: 2
- No. of episodes: 27

Production
- Executive producers: Siddharth Khaitan; Rajesh Chada; Soniya Kulakarni; Dixita Thakur
- Producers: Sameer Nair; Deepak Segal; Myleeta Aga
- Production location: India
- Running time: 22–26 minutes
- Production companies: BBC Studios India; Applause Entertainment

Original release
- Network: Hotstar
- Release: 28 June – 15 September 2019

Related
- The Office

The Office is an Indian television sitcom streaming on Hotstar. It is an adaptation of the original BBC series of the same name, although it follows the American remake more closely. It was co-produced by Applause Entertainment in association with BBC Studios India for Hotstar's new label Hotstar Specials.

== Plot ==
The show is an adaptation of the original British sitcom, based in a branch of Wilkins Chawla. It depicts a 9 to 5 workplace where the boss, Jagdeep Chaddha (played by Mukul Chadda), desperately tries to keep his employees' morale high. He is an overly familiar boss who tells his employees to consider him one of their pals, but unfortunately his weak jokes and failed attempts at camaraderie fail to impress his colleagues, who are perennially bored.

== Production ==
=== Development ===
In January 2019, Applause Entertainment entered partnership in which they will develop the Indian versions of hit series such as The Office and Criminal Justice. The Office team set to adapt the entirety of the British version with episode count being 28 for the adaptation.

=== Casting ===
By June 2018, the casting for the show was complete for the lead roles, with continued casting for recurring and guest roles.

== Cast ==
- Mukul Chadda as Jagdeep Chadha, branch manager (based on Michael Scott). The Manager of Wilkins Chawla Faridabad. He is a self-proclaimed "funjabi" boss who, despite the opinions of his workers, finds himself funny. He finds unique ways to bond with his staff. His age is 42, and is unmarried. His primary love interests are Riya and Geeta.
- Gopal Datt as Triveni Prasad Mishra, assistant to the branch manager (based on Dwight Schrute). Triveni Prasad (more commonly referred to as T.P. by his colleagues) is the assistant to the branch manager at Wilkins Chawla Faridabad. He is an obsequious employee who is often found with Jagdeep Chadha. He is a Swadeshi person and often shows his hate towards Western culture by using Ayurvedic products like asafoetida candy, masala cola, and carom seed tea. He is the prime target of Amit's pranks. He is engaged in wrestling at his akhada in Faridabad Sector 3. In the second season, he develops a secret love interest for Anjali.
- Sayandeep Sengupta as Amit Sharma, salesman (based on Jim Halpert). A salesman at the Wilkins Chawla Faridabad branch. He loves to play pranks in the office, especially with T.P., and with Pammi being his partner in crime. Some of his pranks include shifting T.P.'s desk into the gentleman's toilet, selling his office items on online shopping sites, and many more. He has had a crush on Pammi for a long time, but since Pammi was engaged to be married, he had left the thought of Pammi as his crush but he remained friends with her. He was in a brief relationship with Loveleen, the Office dietician but broke up with her. In Second's last episode before taking a transfer to Wilkins Chawla Gurugram Branch, he opens up his heart and feelings to Pammi about her and kisses her.
- Samridhi Dewan as Pammi Goel, the receptionist (based on Pam Beesley). Pammi is the receptionist at The Wilkins Chawla Faridabad Branch. She is Amit's partner in playing pranks on T.P. She is also the source of news in the office. She is engaged to be married to Parmeet who works in Wilkins Chawla Faridabad branch's warehouse. She wanted to be a graphic designer but left her dreams as Parmeet disapproves it. She considers Amit as her best friend but later even she falls in love with him.
- Abhinav Sharma as Sapan Gill, the intern (based on Ryan Howard). Sapan is an intern working in Wilkins Chawla Faridabad branch. He is often seen with his headphones and always attends high society parties among the Delhi elite. He is also preparing for the Common Admission Test (CAT) examinations and wants to get into IIM. In the second season, Kitty falls in love with him but he breaks up with her but soon patches up with her. T.P. thinks that Sapan is a spoilt rich brat from Defence Colony.
- Gavin N. Methalaka as Kutty, accountant (based on Kevin Malone). Kutty is an accountant working in Wilkins Chawla Faridabad Branch. He is often seen sitting at the corner of the accountant's corner with a reputation of known closet pervert watching questionable content on his computer. He is also known for being to himself while he indulges with food or table games with Rinchin. He is a big, chubby, and fun-loving guy.
- Preeti Kochar as Sarla Bansal, saleswoman (based on Phyllis Vance). Sarla is the only saleswoman in Wilkins Chawla Faridabad Branch. She is an expert in knitting and sewing. She always calls young employees "putar" ("child" in Punjabi). She is a calm person but occasionally angry either when Prem Chopra is in the office or when T.P. tries to enter the ladies' washroom. Sarla used to be a kabaddi champion in her childhood days but she wasn't included in the Office kabaddi team due to Chadda's sexist policy.
- Priyanka Setia as Anjali, accountant (based on Angela Martin). Anjali is the only female accountant in Wilkins Chawla Faridabad Branch. She is high on Indian values just like T.P. Mishra. She does not participate in any antics of the office like Wilkins Olympics (The Office Olympics), script reading, etc. She is also the first employee in the office to discover Amit and Pammi's relationship is more than just friendship. She is always part of various celebration committees and always prepares Sattvic snacks like sabudana vada and laddu. She also hates Western values just like T.P. Mishra. In the second season, she develops a romantic interest with T.P. Mishra.
- Sunil Jetley as Saleem Ghiani, salesman (based on Stanley Hudson). Saleem Ghiani is the senior-most male employee at the Wilkins Chawla Faridabad branch. He is mostly referred as Saleemji by many colleagues but Chadda refers him as Saleem Sahab. He is often stereotyped by Chadda as a typical Muslim man who likes biryani and Urdu poems but on the contrary he doesn't indulge in Urdu poems and hates biryani. He usually doesn't indulge in many office antics and is irritated by Chadha's actions.
- Chien Ho Liao as Rinchin, accountant (based on Oscar Martinez).
- Spruha Joshi as Geeta, a real-estate broker (based on Carol Stills)
- Mallika Dua as Kitty Kataria, customer relations executive (based on Kelly Kapoor) (since season 2).

=== Recurring ===
- Gauahar Khan as Riya Pahwa (based on Jan Levinson).
- Nehpal Gautam as Bhadoria Peon (loosely based on Creed Bratton).
- Ankit Gulati as Bhandari, HR executive.
- Kunal Pant as Parmeet, Pammi's fiancé (based on Roy).
- Mayur Bansiwal as Madhukar, HR (based on Toby Flenderson).
- Manpreet Singh as Rajinder, warehouse foreman (based on Darryl Philbin)
- Anandita Pagnis as Loveleen, Amit's girlfriend (based on Amy Adams' character Katy Moore). Amit broke up with her post-Jim Corbett office trip.
- Ranvir Shorey as Prem Chopra, traveling salesman (based on Todd Packer)

== Episodes ==
=== Season 1 (2019) ===
No. overall	No. in season	Title	Directed by	Written by	Original release date
1	1	"Anekata Diwas"	Debbie Rao	Chirag Mahabal	28 June 2019
After employees complain against their 'Fun'jabi Boss'Jagdeep Chaddha for his offensive humour, the head office assigns Madhukar, The HR Representative of Faridabad Branch to organise a workshop on racial tolerance and diversity.
2	2	"Cost Cutting"	Debbie Rao	Arshad Syed	28 June 2019
When asked to come up with a cost-cutting strategy, Chaddha puts TP in charge who goes out to cut all employee benefits & reimbursement vouchers angering the employees, whereas Chaddha struggles to find incentives to keep employees happy amid the cost-cutting. When Ria finds out that Chaddha had left TP in charge of cost-cutting, she telephones him & asks him to redo TP's work forcing Chaddha to work post office hours to reimburse claims & vouchers
3	3	"A Secret Alliance"	Debbie Rao	Chirag Mahabal	28 June 2019
Otherwise at loggerheads, Amit and TP join hands to fight downsizing. Meanwhile, Chaddha organises a birthday party for Sarla-ji (whose birthday is one month ahead) to dispel the fears of downsizing among the employees.
4	4	"Kabbadi Kabbadi"	Rohan Sippy	Chirag Mahabal	28 June 2019
Chaddha's newest goals - push for overtime and unite the teams. Solution? A 'kabaddi' match between the godown staff and office team, with the losers having to work extra hours & attend office on the weekends.
5	5	"Who's That New Girl?"	Debbie Rao	Chirag Mahabal, Rajesh Devraj, Anurag Pandey	28 June 2019
Loveleen, a hot beauty & fitness consultant has come to the office, and the male employees are trying really hard to win her attention. Meanwhile, the Head Office asks Chaddha to organize an incentive plan for the sales staff but Chaddha gives away the incentive reward (an electronic juice maker) to impress Loveleen but finally, Amit asks her out & successfully manages to seek her attention.
6	6	"The Chaddies"	Debbie Rao	Chirag Mahabal	28 June 2019
It's that time of the year when Chaddha organizes Chaddies - the annual awards night at Wilkins Chawla. The Head Office refuses to fund Chaddha's Awards Night as there is a limited budget for office parties which was already spent by him on another party. Chaddha feels worried about the awards night as there is no group tab for drinks. At the awards night, everyone is bored to death due to Chaddha's boring impressions only Pammi has a good time & kisses Amit due to her intoxication.
7	7	"P.O.S.H."	Rohan Sippy	Shruti Madan	28 June 2019
Madhukar is asked to conduct a sexual harassment workshop at the office after a recent sexual harassment scandal at Wilkins Chawla's Mumbai Head Office involving the CFO Sable. Meanwhile, Chaddha has a WhatsApp Group consisting of the male employees of the office where he shares sexist & offensive jokes. During the workshop, Chaddha visits the godown to share his sexist jokes with the godown staff but he himself becomes the butt of the joke. As usual, Chaddha creates tantrums in Madhukar's workshop which is seen by Ria leading to her intervention.
8	8	"Winkins Olympics"	Rohan Sippy	Sumit Roy	28 June 2019
While the cat's away, the mice will play! As Chaddha steps out of office with TP, Amit and Pammi find a chance to organise impromptu Olympics in the office.
9	9	"Emergency Alert!"	Rohan Sippy	Adhir Bhat	28 June 2019
A fire breaks out in the office, and the employees are asked to evacuate. Chaddha feels that the time is right to impress Sapan, while the team finds an interesting way to kill time.
10	10	"Dandiya Downsize"	Debbie Rao	Arshad Syed	28 June 2019
It's Navratri and the employees are in full dandiya mood. However, Chaddha isn't happy as he has to fire someone today. Who will he choose?
11	11	"Dangal"	Rohan Sippy	Arshad Syed	28 June 2019
Amit tricks Chaddha into challenging TP in a 'dangal'. Chaddha cheats and wins, leaving TP disappointed. To make up for it, he plans a surprise for TP.
12	12	"The Deal"	Rohan Sippy	Adhir Bhat	28 June 2019
Chaddha and Riya are out to meet a client, where he wins more than just the contract. Elsewhere, Pammi and Amit spend some time together.

=== Season 2 (2019) ===
No. overall	No. in season	Title	Directed by	Written by	Original release date
13	1	"Appraisal Time"	Rohan Sippy	Sruthi Madan	15 September 2019
It's appraisal time at Wilkins Chawla, but Chaddha is losing sleep over his "relationship" with Riya. Meanwhile, a new client relations executive has joined the team.
14	2	"The Nosy Boss"	Rohan Sippy	Sruthi Madan	15 September 2019
When Chaddha begins to monitor the team's emails, he doesn't like what he finds. Elsewhere, Pammi suspects romance brewing between an unlikely pair in the office
15	3	"Diwali Dhamaka"	Bumpy	Arshad Syed	15 September 2019
Diwali celebration at Wilkins Chawla is in full swing and Chaddha suggests the team to play a weird game.
16	4	"The Hunter"	Bumpy	Chirag Mahabal	15 September 2019
Chaddha takes the team to Jim Corbett National Park for a motivational session where a series of events make Amit realise that he can't let Pammi go.
17	5	"The Accident"	Rohan Sippy	Sumit Roy	15 September 2019
When Chaddha burns his foot at home, TP volunteers to help, but lands in trouble. However, we see a new side of TP's personality.
18	6	"It's a Secret"	Rohan Sippy	Sruthi Madan	15 September 2019
Now that Chaddha knows Amit's secret, the latter is on tenterhooks. Meanwhile, a suspicious TP spies on Rinchin and a truth is revealed.
19	7	"The Hooligan"	Bumpy	Adhir Bhat	15 September 2019
Someone has vandalised Chaddha's office and he suspects the employees of foul play.
20	8	"Riya v Chadda"	Bumpy	Sruthi Madan	15 September 2019
Riya is at the Faridabad branch to lead a seminar for the women. Feeling ignored, Chaddha tries to bond with the menfolk in the office and the warehouse.
21	9	"Hearts and Roses"	Bumpy	Arshad Syed	15 September 2019
Chaddha is off to meet the new CFO of Wilkins Chawla on Valentine's Day. During the trip, he spills the beans about Riya and him to other branch managers, one of whom uses the information to his advantage.
22	10	"Top Salesman"	Bumpy	Sruthi Madan	15 September 2019
Being the top salesman of the year at Wilkins Chawla, TP has to address the salesmen's convention. Finding him nervous, Amit offers to help.
23	11	"Welcome Kids"	Bumpy	Arshad Syed	15 September 2019
It's kids' day and the employees get their children to work. Chaddha, of course, has a gala time. Amid the fun, Saleem's teenage daughter develops a crush on Sapan and Kitty runs interference.
24	12	"Chadda's Birthday"	Bumpy	Chirag Mahabal	15 September 2019
Chaddha is excited about his birthday but the staff isn't. They are worried about Kutty's impending medical test reports.
25	13	"'Joint' Effort"	Bumpy	Arshad Syed	15 September 2019
TP finds a leftover joint in the parking lot, and tries to find the owner. When no one confesses, he schedules a drug test for all. Worried, Chaddha puts forth a weird demand to TP.
26	14	"Employee Grievances"	Bumpy	Adhir Bhat	15 September 2019
Chaddha learns that employee conflicts that are registered with Madhukar have not been resolved. He takes the matter in his own hands and creates a mess.
27	15	"Founder's Day"	Bumpy	Chirag Mahabal	15 September 2019
Chaddha organises a Founder’s Day party for charity, but inadvertently ends up inviting both Riya and Geeta. Post party, Amit opens up to Pammi.

== Release ==
The first season with episode count of 13 was slated to release on June 28, 2019. The second season which was filmed with first season itself was slated to release on September 15, 2019.

=== Promotion ===
The trailer was released by Hotstar on various platforms on 4 June 2019. The team engaged mainly in social media promotions as they poised the series towards younger generations. The promotion for Season 2 was started in early September revealing the release date.

== Special ==
In May 2020, the cast reprised their roles for a special episode that was created during the COVID-19 pandemic. The episode was released on YouTube

== International broadcast ==
The show is available to stream in Pakistan on TapMad and in the US on Hulu.

== Reception ==
The series received mixed reviews. Firstpost reviewed it, saying, "Good performances, apt casting make Hotstar's lazily-written remake watchable". New Indian Express had a more mixed view, summarizing it as, "Brownie points for accuracy, but magic lost in translation". Raja Sen from Livemint described it as, "decent, not special". Rohan Nahaar from Hindustan Times rated it 2/5 and called it an "unfunny, unnecessary carbon copy of the American classic".

== Accolades ==
Year	Award	Category	Recipient	Result
2019	iReel Awards	Best Comedy	The Office	Nominated
2019	iReel Awards	Best Actor, Male (Comedy)	Mukul Chadda	Nominated
2019	Gold Awards	Best Actor in a Comic Role (Male)	Mukul Chadda	Nominated
2019	Critics Choice Awards	Best Actor (Comedy/Romance)	Mukul Chadda	Nominated
2020	Spott Awards	Best Actor	Mukul Chadda	Won
2020	E4M Media Streaming Awards	Best Actor in a Comic Role (Male)	Mukul Chadda	Won
2020	Filmfare OTT Awards	Best Actor - Comedy Series	Mukul Chadda	Nominated
