= Aisha Ahmed =

Indian actress

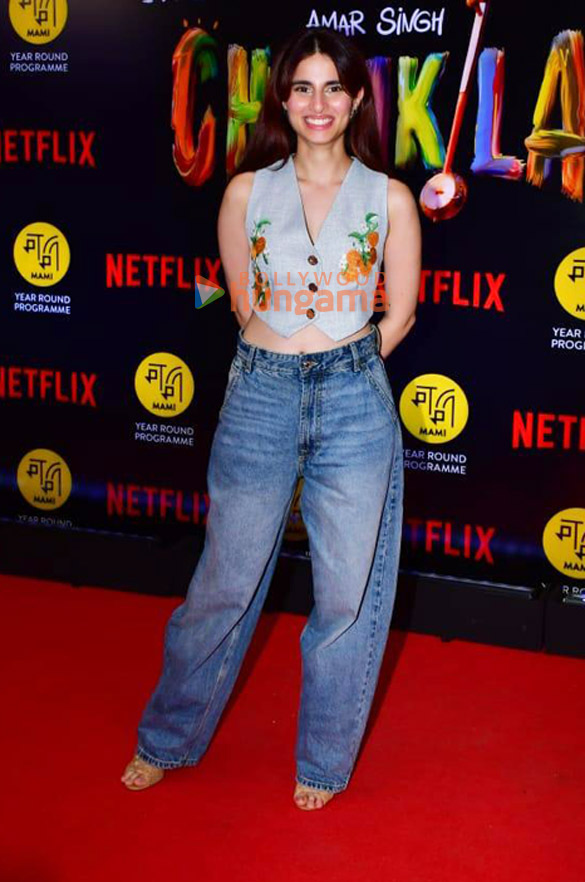
- Ahmed in 2024
- Born: 8 May 1996 (age 30); Mumbai, Maharashtra, India
- Occupation: Actress
- Years active: 2016–present
- Mother: Rukhsar Rehman

Aisha Ahmed is an Indian actress. Daughter of the actress Rukhsar Rehman, she is best known for playing leading roles in several popular streaming series, including Adulting (2018) and Minus One (2019). She also entered films with the thriller 3 Storeys in 2018.

== Career ==
Ahmed had a minor role in the film Tum Bin 2 (2016). She made her debut in Arjun Mukerjee's 3 Storeys (2018). In a positive review, Devesh Sharma of Filmfare praised Ahmed's chemistry with co-star Ankit Rathi. The same year, she appeared as Nikhat Rizvi in Jessica Sadana's series Adulting, alongside Yashaswini Dayama. Her performance was well received.

In 2019, Ahmed featured opposite Ayush Mehra in the romantic comedy Minus One. The show had a second season, titled New Chapter, released in 2023 on Lionsgate Play. Ahmed has also played leading roles in the MX Player series Balcony Buddies (2021; opposite Amol Parashar) and Zoya Parvin's short film Clean (2021). In 2022, she played a supporting character in the Shubham Yogi-film Kacchey Limbu.

In 2024, Ahmed starred in the music video "Nadaaniyan", alongside singer Akshath Acharya.

== Personal life ==
Aisha is the daughter of actress Rukhsar Rehman and Rehman's first husband Asad Ahmed. Director Faruk Kabir used to be Aisha's stepfather.

== Filmography ==
=== Films ===
Year	Title	Role	Notes	Ref.
2016	Tum Bin 2	Sharanpreet	Debut film	
2018	3 Storeys	Malini Mathur		
2021	Clean	Meher	Short film	
2022	Kacchey Limbu	Sara	JioCinema film	

=== Web series ===
Year	Title	Role	Notes	Ref.
2018	Adulting	Nikhat Rizvi		
2019	Minus One	Ria		
2021	Balcony Buddies	Sunanda		
2025	Single Papa	Dr. Shreya Aggarwal	Netflix series	

=== Music video appearances ===
Year	Title	Singer	Ref.
2019	"Sage"	Ritviz	
2020	"Sukoon"	Taaruk Raina	
2024	"Nadaaniyan"	Akshath Acharya	
