= Neeraj Pandey (writer) =

Indian writer (born 1989)

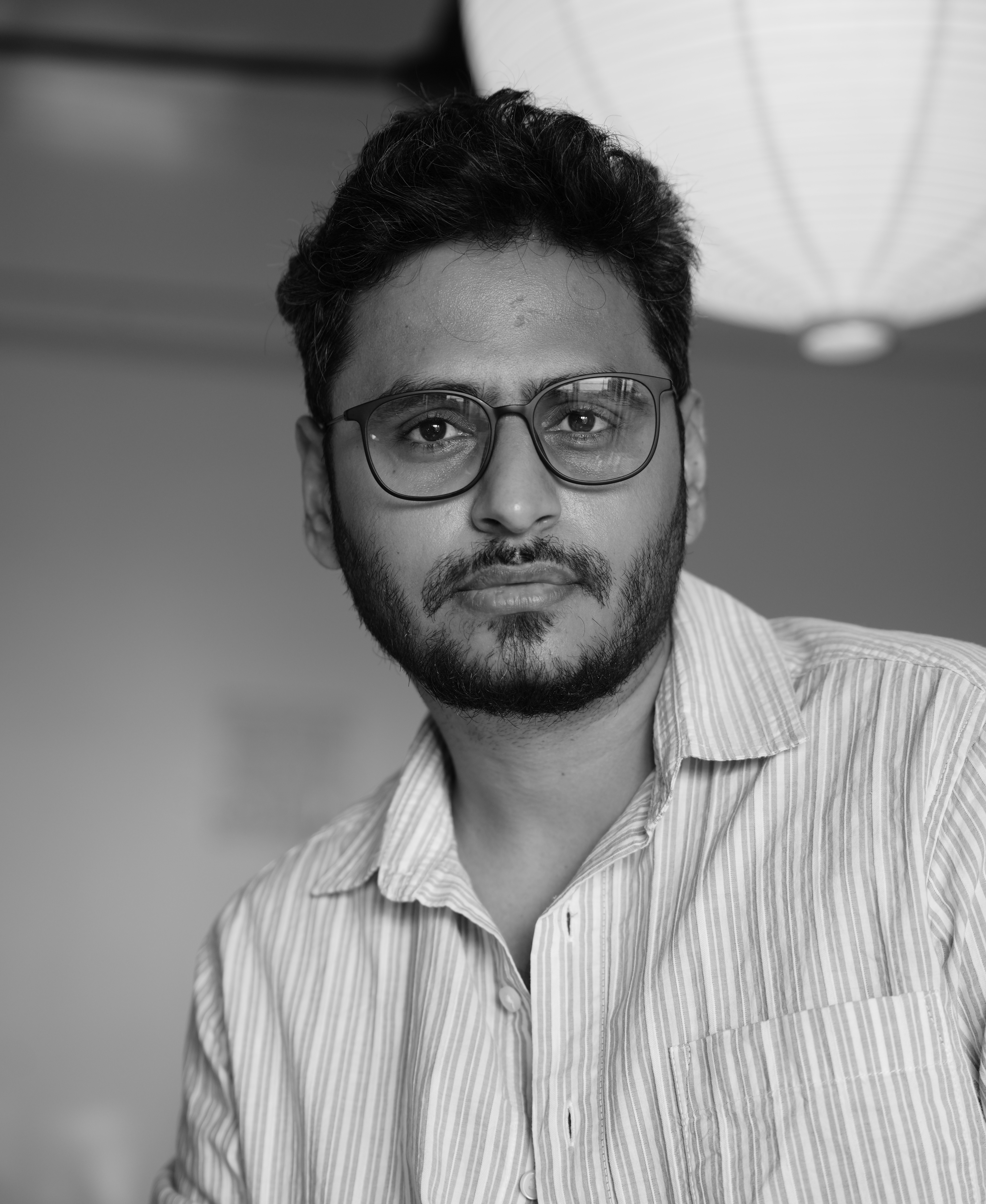
- Pandey in 2025
- Born: 9 March 1989 (age 37); Buxar, Bihar, India
- Occupations: Novelist; Screenwriter; Lyricist
- Writing career
- Years active: 2017—present
- Notable works: Mrs., Hasmukh, Ramprasad Ki Tehrvi, Kaamyaab

Neeraj Pandey (born 9 March 1989) is an Indian novelist, screenwriter, and lyricist who works in Hindi cinema.

Pandey has written lyrics for Ramprasad Ki Tehrvi, Kaamyaab, and Mrs.. He has written dialogues for Hasmukh and Kacchey Limbu, and also co-written the second season of Your Honor. He has written the novels Door Aasmaan Mein and Kahin Aur Par Kahan. He has also co-produced the film Aani Maani.

== Early life and education ==
Pandey was born in the village of Naya Bhojpur in the Buxar district and grew up in Bhabua.

== Career ==
In 2015, after working for seven years in the gaming and animation industries, Pandey moved to Mumbai to become a full time writer. In 2023, he released his first novel, Door Aasmaan Mein.

== Filmography ==
Year	Title	Screenplay	Dialogue	Lyrics	Ref.
2017	Sameer	Yes	Yes		
2018	Galti Se Mis-Tech	Yes	Yes		
2018	Kaamyaab			Yes	
2019	Moothon (The Elder One)			Yes	
2019	Minus One (Season 2): New Chapter			Yes	
2019	Ramprasad Ki Tehrvi			Yes	
2020	Hasmukh		Yes		
2021	Tryst With Destiny		Yes		
2021	Your Honor (Season 2)	Yes	Yes		
2022	Kacchey Limbu		Yes		
2024	Little Thomas			Yes	
2025	Mrs.			Yes	
2026	Happy Patel: Khatarnak Jasoos			Yes	

== Books ==
- Door Aasmaan Mein (2023), Pankti Prakashan
- Kahin Aur Par Kahan (2025), Unbound Script
