= Dhaaak =

2024 Indian Hindi-language film

- Directed by: Anees Barudwale
- Screenplay by: Anees Barudwale; Nisar Akhtar (dialogues)
- Story by: Anees Barudwale
- Produced by: M.H. Mullanavar
- Starring: Mohd Saleem Mullanavar; Sheena Shahabadi; Pradeep Singh Rawat
- Cinematography: Mukesh Sharma
- Edited by: Shadap Memon; Irfan Ishak Shaikh
- Music by: Vardan Singh; Meet Handa; Sahajahn Shaikh Sagar
- Production company: I M King Films International
- Release date: 19 April 2024
- Running time: 127 Minutes
- Country: India
- Language: Hindi

Dhaaak is Indian Hindi-language film, written and directed by Anees Barudwale. The film stars Mohd Saleem Mullanavar, Sheena Shahabadi and Pradeep SIngh Rawat in lead roles.

== Cast ==
- Mohd Saleem Mullanavar
- Sheena Shahabadi
- Pradeep Singh Rawat
- Avinash Wadhawan
- Ruslaan Mumtaz
- Vaishnavi Macdonald
- Prithvi Vazir
- Hemant Choudhary
- Rajendra Shisatkar

== Production ==
The film is mostly shot in Mumbai, Maharashtra, India. The film would be released in cinemas on April 19, 2024, worldwide. Besides Hindi, the film will also be released in Tamil and Telugu.

== Soundtrack ==
Dhaaak

Soundtrack album by Vardan Singh Meet Handa Sahajahn Shaikh Sagar
- Released: 5 February 2024
- Recorded: 2023–2024
- Genre: Feature film soundtrack
- Length: 8:30
- Language: Hindi
- Label: Lokdhun
External audio
- Video on YouTube

The music of the film is composed by Vardan Singh, Meet Handa and Sahajahn Shaikh Sagar while sung by singers including Vardan Singh, Richa Sharma, Swati Sharma and others.

No.	Title	Lyrics	Music	Singer(s)	Length
1.	"Jaikara"	Sahil Sultanpuri	Vardan Singh	Vardan Singh	-
2.	"Peer Fakeer"	-	Vardan Singh; Meet Handa; Sahajahn Shaikh Sagar	-	-
3.	"Tum Mil Gaye"	SahilSultanpuri	Vardan Singh; Meet Handa; Sahajahn Shaikh Sagar	-	-
4.	"Khwaab Poore Huye"	Sahil Sultanpuri	Vardan Singh	Swati Sharma	-
Total length:					8:30

== See also ==
- Music launch Video on YouTube
