= Rajbeer Singh =

Indian television actor

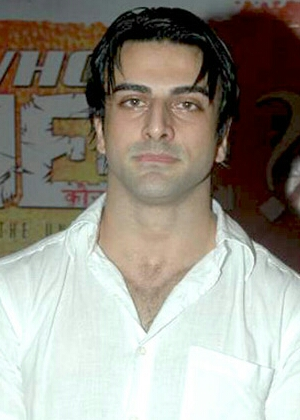
- Born: Pathankot, Punjab, India
- Occupations: Actor; model
- Years active: 2009–2016

Rajbeer Singh is an Indian actor and model who works in Hindi film and television. He appeared in the Hindi horror film Who's There? as Sunny Malhotra. Singh made his television debut on the STAR Plus reality show Perfect Bride. From 2013 to 2014, he played the lead role of Hatim on the Life OK series The Adventures of Hatim.

== Career ==
Singh made his television debut on the STAR Plus reality show Perfect Bride. He also played an episodic role on Rishta.com. From 2013 to 2014, Singh played the lead role of Hatim on the Life OK series The Adventures of Hatim. He then performed as Azaad, the lead male role in Zee TV's Qubool Hai Season 4, from August 2015 to November 2015. In Qubool Hai, Singh acted as a half-vampire opposite female lead Surbhi Jyoti.

== Filmography ==
=== Television ===
- 2009 Perfect Bride as himself
- 2010 Rishta.com
- 2013–2014 The Adventures of Hatim as Hatim
- 2015 Qubool Hai as Azaad Iqbal Khan

=== Films ===
- 2011 Who's There?
- 2016 Ishq Junoon
- 2016 Club Dancer
