= Bebaak (film) =

2019 Indian short film

- Directed by: Shazia Iqbal
- Written by: Shazia Iqbal
- Produced by: Anurag Kashyap
- Starring: Sana Pathan; Sheeba Chaddha; Sarah Hashmi; Vipin Sharma; Nawazuddin Siddiqui
- Cinematography: Sachin Gadankush
- Edited by: Dipika Kalra, Jabeen Merchant
- Music by: Alokananda Dasgupta
- Production company: Jar Pictures
- Release date: 23 May 2019 (India)
- Running time: 20 minutes
- Country: India
- Languages: Hindi, Urdu

Bebaak (Dying wind in her hair) is a Hindi and Urdu language short film written and directed by Shazia Iqbal in 2019 and produced by Jar Pictures. This film is based on a true tale about a young woman named Fatin who was publicly reprimanded for being a woman at a scholarship interview by a religious leader.

== Plot ==
Based on a real-life incident, Bebaak examines the patriarchal idea of male agency over female bodies, which is based on a systematic theological notion that demands women cover up in order to be "more humble, respectful, and acceptable" by society. It tells the tale of Fatin, a young woman from a low-income family who encounters chauvinism and is reprimanded by a religious leader during a scholarship interview.

== Cast ==
- Sana Pathan
- Sheeba Chaddha
- Sarah Hashmi
- Vipin Sharma
- Nawazuddin Siddiqui

== Awards ==
Year	Award	Category	Recipients	Result
2019	São Paulo International Short Film Festival	Audience Favourite	Bebaak	Won
2019	São Paulo International Short Film Festival	Best Debut Director	Shazia Iqbal	Won
2019	New York Indo-American Arts Council Film Festival	Best Short Fiction	Shazia Iqbal	Won
2019	Los Angeles Indian Film Festival	Best Short Film	Bebaak	Won
2019	Chicago South Asian Film Festival	Best Short Film	Bebaak	Won
2020	Filmfare Awards	Best Actress in a Short Film	Sarah Hashmi	Won
2020	Filmfare Awards	Best Short Film (Fiction)	Shazia Iqbal	Won
2021	Critics’ Choice Shorts and Series Awards, India	Best Short Film	Bebaak	Won

== Reception ==
- Bebaak views freedom as a network of connected crackers rather than a single spark that, when lighted, can burn the ground. It doesn't exhibit this hurry or lack of determination. The conclusion of a movie with significant themes revolves upon a little girl and her gaze, yearning, and anticipation.
- The film's script is incisive and to the point, highlighting the ridiculousness of the religious pressure placed on women to wear a certain manner, especially in an environment as modern as India.

== Controversy ==
The scandal surrounding Anurag Kashyap stems from his alleged negligence in a sexual assault accusation against his former business partner Vikas Bahl, and it has stained a short film he made on his own. The Kashyap and Jar Films-produced film Bebaak, starring Shazia Iqbal, has been removed from this month's Mumbai Film Festival.
