= Operation MBBS =

Indian TV show

- Genre: Comedy Drama
- Written by: Puneet Batra
- Story by: Ayesha Nair; Puneet Batra; Dr. Pravin Yadav
- Directed by: Amrit Raj Gupta
- Starring: Ayush Mehra; Anshul Chauhan; Sarah Hashmi
- Music by: Karthik Rao; Arabinda Neog
- Country of origin: India
- Original language: Hindi
- No. of seasons: 2
- No. of episodes: 10

Production
- Producers: Aditi Shrivastava; Ashwin Suresh; Anirudh Pandit
- Editor: Divyajot Singh
- Production company: Pocket Aces

Original release
- Release: 22 February 2020

Operation MBBS is an Indian Hindi-language medical drama–comedy web series directed by Amrit Raj Gupta and written by Puneet Batra, Ayesh Nair and Praveen Yadav for Dice Media. It shows the story of three MBBS students played by Ayush Mehra, Anshul Chauhan and Sarah Hashmi.

== Premise ==
Operation MBBS explores the life of three medical students who come from different backgrounds, in a MBBS college. It follows a growing friendship between the three main characters and hardships of aspiring doctors.

== Cast ==
- Ayush Mehra as Nishant Singh
- Anshul Chauhan as Sakshi
- Sarah Hashmi as Huma
- Geetanjali Kulkarni as Dean Sadhna
- Prateek Pachauri as Ketan Chorai "KC"
- Sagar Kale as Aakash's father
- Deepak Simwal as Aakash
- Aditi Sanwal as Lata
- Rahul Tewari as Pravin
- Shushant Shetty as Yash
- Mohit Doultani as Jugal
- Momita Aisi
- Sachin Kathuria
- Priya Tandon as Chaaru
- Karan Thakur as Professor
- Ajay Jadav as Dr Nikkam
- Nazneen Madan as Dr Kulkarni

== Episodes ==
=== Series overview ===
Overview of Operation MBBS seasons
Series	Episodes	Originally released		
Series	Episodes	First released	Last released	Network
1	5	22 February 2020	21 March 2020	YouTube, Prime video, MX Player
2	5	15 March 2021	7 April 2021	YouTube, Prime video, MX Player

=== Season 1 ===
There are total 5 episodes in season 1 of Operation MBBS.

No. overall	No. in season	Title	Directed by	Written by	Original release date
1	1	"Infection"	Amrit Raj Gupta	Puneet Batra, Ayesha Nair, Pravin Yadav	22 February 2020
2	2	"Diagnosis"	Amrit Raj Gupta	Puneet Batra, Ayesha Nair, Pravin Yadav	29 February 2020
3	3	"Complications"	Amrit Raj Gupta	Puneet Batra, Ayesha Nair, Pravin Yadav	7 March 2020
4	4	"Surgery"	Amrit Raj Gupta	Puneet Batra, Ayesha Nair, Pravin Yadav	14 March 2020
5	5	"Recovery"	Amrit Raj Gupta	Puneet Batra, Ayesha Nair, Pravin Yadav	21 March 2020

=== Season 2 ===
Season 2 of Operation MBBS was released 1 year after the 1st season on 15 March 2021. It explores the 2nd year of MBBS of Nishant, Sakshi and Huma.

No. overall	No. in season	Title	Directed by	Written by	Original release date
6	1	"Honeymoon Period"	Amrit Raj Gupta	Puneet Batra, Ayesha Nair, Pravin Yadav	15 March 2021
7	2	"Donning"	Amrit Raj Gupta	Puneet Batra, Ayesha Nair, Pravin Yadav	20 March 2021
8	3	"Patient Zero"	Amrit Raj Gupta	Puneet Batra, Ayesha Nair, Pravin Yadav	25 March 2021
9	4	"Lockdown"	Amrit Raj Gupta	Puneet Batra, Ayesha Nair, Pravin Yadav	30 March 2021
10	5	"Critical Condition"	Amrit Raj Gupta	Puneet Batra, Ayesha Nair, Pravin Yadav	7 April 2021
