= Ishq Junoon =

2016 Indian film directed by Vikramjit Singh

- Theatrical release poster
- Directed by: Sanjay Sharma
- Screenplay by: Pankaj Trivedi
- Story by: Satya Prakash
- Produced by: Anuj Sharma; Vinay Gupta
- Starring: Rajbeer Singh; Divya Singh; Akshay Rangshahi
- Cinematography: R. Sanket
- Edited by: Mukesh Thakur
- Music by: Vardan Singh; Jeet Gannguli; Ankit Tiwari(Uncredited); Anjjan Bhattacharya; Sanjeev–Darshan
- Production companies: Shantketan Entertainments, Vinr Films
- Release date: 11 November 2016
- Running time: 103 minutes
- Country: India
- Language: Hindi

Ishq Junoon (transl. Obsessive Love) is a 2016 Indian Hindi-language erotic romance film written and directed by Sanjay Sharma and produced by Anuj Sharma and Vinay Gupta under their banners Shantketan Entertainments and Vinr Films respectively. It stars Rajbeer Singh, Divya Singh, Akshay Rangshahi, Raj Aryan and Reshad Delawar Khan. The film was released on 11 November 2016.

Vardan Singh, Ankit Tiwari, Jeet Gannguli, Anjjan Bhattacharya and Sanjeev–Darshan were announced as the composers of the soundtrack. Vardan Singh got the first chance in this movie. His song "Kabhi Yun Bhi" reached 10th place in the UK's top 10 music, a notable achievement for Hindi cinema. Vardan Singh's song got a popular response online in just 24 hours.

== Plot ==
Pakhi (Divya Singh) is an engaged girl who can do anything for money and wants to become an air hostess. Her fiancé Ranjeet (Raj Aryan) is a kindhearted man and convinces his and Pakhi's parents to let Pakhi go to training for air hostess. Pakhi gets drunk and goes to a club where some guys try to rape her but she is saved by Raj (Rajbeer Singh) who also drops her to the hostel. Raj is an extremely rich man and when Pakhi's friends tells her about him she becomes his girlfriend. Raj then asks Pakhi to go with him to his farmhouse and she lies to her parents who have sent Ranjeet to take her home. Pakhi refuses and reveals to Ranjeet that Raj is her boyfriend. Raj then takes Pakhi to his farmhouse where they spend a night and the next morning Veer (Akshay Rangshahi) who is Raj's close friend and also he is the one who help Raj become rich. Veer falls in love with Pakhi and Raj spend another night together and the next morning Raj goes missing. Pakhi asks Veer about Raj who then checks the cameras and finds nothing about Raj. Veer than goes to horse riding with Pakhi who is surprised to see the huge amount of land owned by Veer. She then sleeps with him. The next morning Raj sees her sleeping with Veer and asks Pakhi to marry them both.

Raj then reveals that 15 years ago Raj and Veer were both in an orphanage when a man and a woman comes to adopt a child who can do labor as it is an excuse to adopt them and their real motive is to take someone for child labor. They choose Raj who says he'll only go if they take Veer with him, so they adopt them both. The woman was a cougar and she then sleeps with young Raj and Veer. The man sees the trio and tries to kill them but Raj hits the man in the head while he is trying to kill his wife and Veer. The man dies of his injuries and the Police Commissioner who comes to investigate is seduced by the woman who makes a deal that the Policeman will only charge Raj and Veer for the murder. Raj and Veer sees this and they kill the Policeman and woman both and bury them. In the present it is also revealed that Veer tried to dance with Pakhi when she was drunk at the party earlier and Raj manipulated Pakhi so Veer can get close to Pakhi. It is also revealed that Ranjeet came to pick Pakhi but he was framed by Delawar (Reshad Delawar Khan) who is Raj and Veer's caretaker. Pakhi tries to escape while Raj and Veer are sleeping. She is caught by Raj and Veer. She then tries to escape a second time while Raj and Veer are out but Delawar is watching over her. She then seduces him and they both escape together but encounter Raj and Veer on the way. Raj and Veer fight with Delawar and kill him and Pakhi lies that Delawar tried to take her without her consent.

Pakhi than agrees to marry Raj and Veer and on the marriage day she throws sindoor on Raj and Veer's eyes and runs and disables all the cameras and runs into the jungle. Meanwhile, Ranjeet frees himself and reaches Pakhi and helps her escape and Ranjeet jumps on Veer and tries to kill him but Raj shoots Ranjeet. Raj and Veer try to take Pakhi with them but Ranjeet hits a rock on Veer's head who dies and Raj is unable to bear the loss and kills himself. In the end, Pakhi and Ranjeet reconcile.

== Cast ==
- Divya Singh as Pakhi
- Rajbeer Singh as Raj
- Akshay Rangshahi as Veer
- Raj Aryan as Ranjeet
- Reshad Delawar Khan as Delawar

== Music ==
Five composers – Vardan Singh, Jeet Gannguli, Ankit Tiwari (uncredited), Anjjan Bhattacharya and Sanjeev–Darshan have been named as creators of the film's music.

Track #	Song	Singer(s)	Lyrics	Composer(s)
1	"Kabhi Yun Bhi"	Vardan Singh	Azeem Shirazi	Vardan Singh.
2	"Ishq Junoon" Title Track	Yasser Desai	Sanjeev Chaturvedi	Jeet Gannguli
3	"Tu Hi Toh Meri Khawaishyan"	Mohammed Irfan	Sanjeev Chaturvedi	Jeet Gannguli
4	"Ishq Junoon" Unplugged	Unknown	Sanjeev Chaturvedi	Jeet Gannguli
5	"Tu Hi Mera Rab Hai"	Ankit Tiwari and Sukriti Kakar	Sanjeev Chaturvedi	Ankit Tiwari (Uncredited)
6	"Re Naseeba"	Rekha Bhardwaj	Sanjeev Chaturvedi	Sanjeev Darshan
7	"Sirf Tu..."	Anjjan feat. Mohit Chauhan	Sanjeev Chaturvedi	Anjjan Bhattacharya
