= Vir Das =

Indian comedian and actor (born 1979)

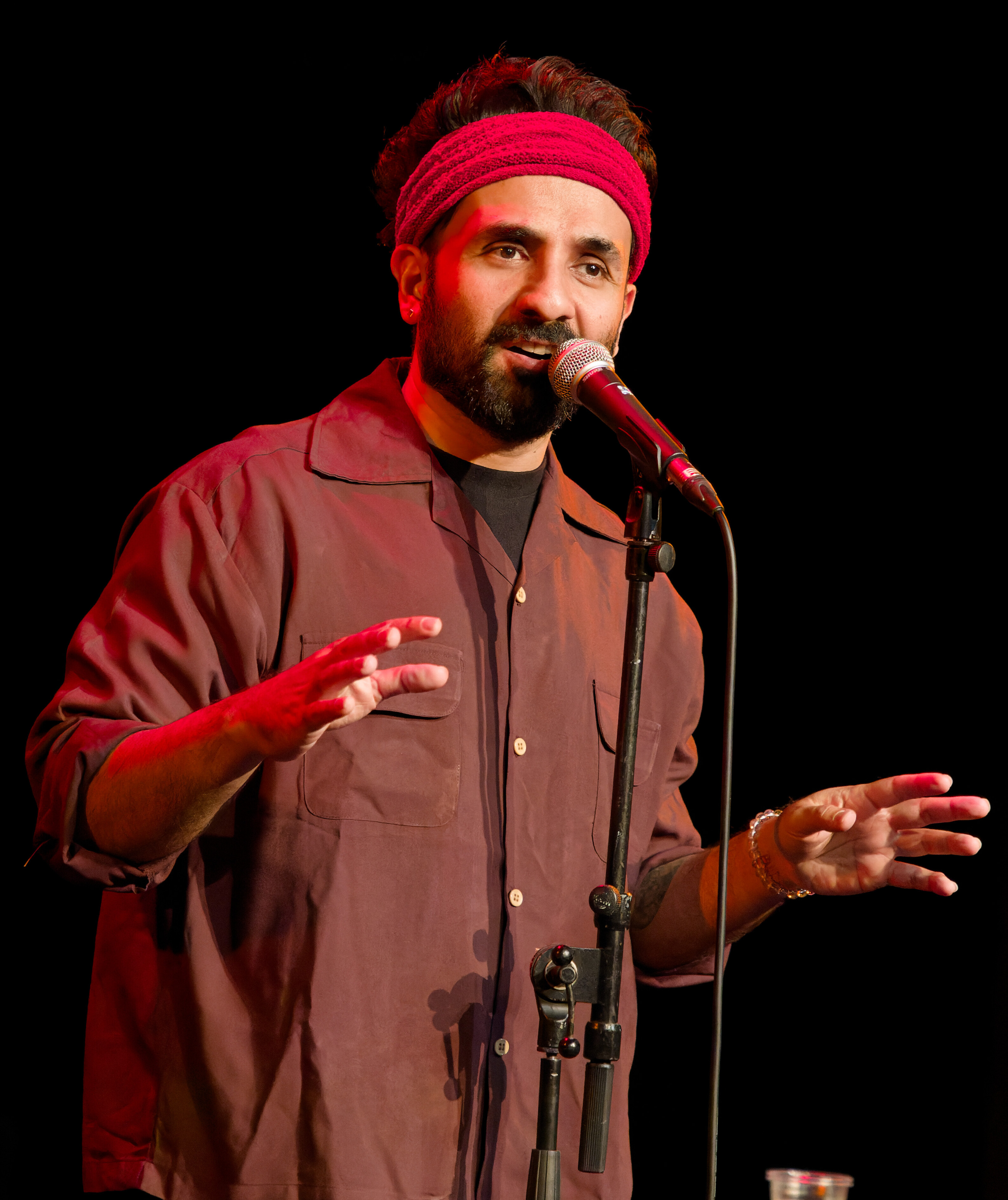
- Das at the 2024 Edinburgh Festival Fringe
- Born: 31 May 1979 (age 47); Dehradun, Uttar Pradesh (now in Uttarakhand), India
- Education: Knox College (Illinois) (BS Economics and Theatre); Moscow Art Theatre - Harvard University (Stanislavsky Program)
- Occupations: Comedian; actor; comedy musician
- Years active: 2005–present
- Spouse: Shivani Mathur (m. 2014)
- Relatives: Brajbir Saran Das (grandfather)
- Awards: International Emmy Awards 2023 in Comedy
- Website: www.virdas.in

Vir Das (born 31 May 1979) is an Indian comedian, actor and musician. After beginning a career in standup comedy, Das moved to Hindi cinema starring in films like Badmaash Company (2010), Delhi Belly (2011), and Go Goa Gone (2013) in supporting roles. In 2017, he performed the Netflix special Abroad Understanding. Das has appeared in approximately 35 plays, over 100 stand-up comedy shows, 18 films, eight TV shows and six comedy specials. He has written comedic columns for Femina, Maxim, Exotica, DNA and Tehelka. In 2019, he made his debut in American television with the television series, Whiskey Cavalier. He won the 2023 International Emmy Award for Best Comedy Series for the Netflix comedy special Vir Das: Landing.

== Biography ==
Vir Das was born to Ranu Das and Madhur Das in Dehradun on 31 May 1979. He was raised in Nigeria and India. In Nigeria, he attended the Indian Language School in Lagos, Nigeria. In India, he attended The Lawrence School, Sanawar and Delhi Public School, Noida. After 18 months at Sri Venkateswara College, University of Delhi he went to the United States. There he obtained a bachelor's degree from Knox College, Galesburg, Illinois in Economics and Theatre with a concentration in performance. After graduating from Knox, Das was accepted to Harvard University and Moscow Arts Theatre for their joint Stanislavsky Program. He has a sister Trisha, who is four years elder to him and is a published author and a documentary filmmaker. His grandfather Brajbir Saran Das was a Padma Shri awardee from Bengal. He married his girlfriend after five years of relationship, Shivani Mathur, in October 2014.

== Career ==
Das returned to India in 2003 and performed a stand-up show at the India Habitat Centre in New Delhi, which he later described as a turning point in his career. He subsequently hosted the Times Food Guide Awards and, in 2005, began hosting television programmes on Zoom, including Is Route Ki Sabhin Linein Maast Hain and the late-night stand-up show Ek Rahin Vir. He became a corporate comedian before leaving the profession in 2007 to pursue stand-up full-time, writing and performing "Walking on Broken Das", at one of New Delhi's most premier hotels. In 2009, his production company Weirdass Productions launched Ham-ateur Nights, an open-mic series intended to provide a platform for emerging comedians; the shows were initially held at BlueFrog in Mumbai and were later planned for other Indian cities. The series was later described as an important meeting point for comedians who went on to become prominent figures in Indian stand-up, including Rohan Joshi, Varun Thakur and Tanmay Bhat.

Das was the host of News on the Loose, his own news comedy show on CNBC-TV18. News on the Loose was given its own weekly half-hour special News On The Loose — Weekend on CNBC-TV18.

Das was cast as the comic relief in The Curse of King Tut's Tomb, a Hallmark mini-series filmed in India. He began filming for his first two Bollywood roles in early 2006. He played a small role Vipul Shah's 2007 movie Namastey London.

Vir Das has also worked with Ashvin Gidwani Productions-AGP on stand-up shows like Walking on Broken Das, Battle of Da Sexes, and History of India: VIRitten, which he wrote and directed.

He performed at Edinburgh Festival Fringe in 2011, 2022 and 2024.

On 25 April 2017, Das's Netflix special Abroad Understanding was released, in the process becoming the first Indian comedian with a comedy special on the platform. In December 2018, Das released his second Netflix comedy special, entitled Losing It. In 2019, Das released his travel-cum-comedy show Jestination Unknown where he explores how Indians see humour along with a couple of other stand-up comedians and celebrities.

He starred opposite Preity Zinta in a Fresh Off the Boat episode titled "The Magic Motor Inn". He plays the patriarch of an Indian family. Das's onscreen family was slated to be at the centre of the plot of the official spin-off of the same show. However, the show was not picked up by networks.

During the lockdown in 2020 he was on Netflix in a one-hour special called Vir Das: Outside In.

A petition was filed against Das' 2020 show, Hasmukh, in the Delhi High Court, by two lawyers, who claimed that the series "maligned the legal profession". The plea for an interim injunction against the show was subsequently dismissed by the court, as it observed that "the very essence of democracy is that a creative artist is given the liberty to project the picture of the society in a manner he perceives". In 2021, in an interview with DeadAnt, Das revealed that the court had also officially defined the job of a stand-up comedian in its ruling, stating, "The job of a comedian is to take it to ridiculous places, to make it absurd, any resemblance it is not to be taken seriously, doesn’t warrant legal action".

On 12 November 2021, Das performed a monologue titled "Two Indias" at the Kennedy Center in Washington. He contrasted India's rich and poor, criticised politicians and democratic backsliding, and noted divisions over Bollywood films and cricket teams. On the topic of women, he remarked: "I come from an India where we worship women during the day and gang-rape them at night." The performance received a standing ovation, but Indian politicians filed seven police complaints against Das, including for insulting India on foreign soil.

In November 2022, Mumbai police issued a first information report against Das, two other people, and online streaming platform Netflix on charges of copyright rules violation, following a complaint by theatre producer Ashvin Gidwani of AGP World that Das had re-used material from his previous show in his Netflix special.

On 29 January 2023, Das appeared on the Conan O'Brien Needs a Friend podcast and discussed faking appendicitis as a child, the first laugh he ever got on stage, the controversy over his "Two Indias" monologue, and his new special Vir Das: Landing.

He hosted the 52nd International Emmy Awards in 2024.

In December 2025, he announced his directorial debut titled Happy Patel: Khatarnak Jasoos, produced by Aamir Khan Productions, which stars Das himself, Mona Singh, Mithila Palkar, Imran Khan and a cameo appearance by Aamir Khan. It released on 16 January 2026, to mixed-to-positive reviews.

== Works ==
=== Film ===
Key
| † | Denotes films that have not yet been released |

| Year | Film | Role | Notes |
|---|---|---|---|
| 2007 | Namastey London | Prospective Groom No. 2 | Guest appearance |
| 2007 | Mumbai Salsa | Rajeev | |
| 2009 | Love Aaj Kal | Shonty | |
| 2010 | Badmaash Company | Chandu | |
| 2011 | Delhi Belly | Arup | Nominated - Filmfare Award for Best Supporting Actor |
| 2013 | Go Goa Gone | Luv | |
| 2013 | Sooper Se Ooper | Ranvir | |
| 2014 | Shaadi Ke Side Effects | Manav | |
| 2014 | Revolver Rani | Rohan Kapoor | |
| 2014 | Amit Sahni Ki List | Amit Sahni | |
| 2016 | Mastizaade | Aditya Chotia | |
| 2016 | Santa Banta | Banta | |
| 2016 | 31st October | Devender Singh | |
| 2016 | Raakh | Protagonist | |
| 2016 | Shivaay | Wahab | |
| 2017 | Patel Ki Punjabi Shaadi | Monty Tondon | |
| 2022 | The Bubble | Ronjon | American film |
| 2026 | Happy Patel: Khatarnak Jasoos | Happy Patel | Directorial debut, also writer and producer |

=== Television ===
| Year | Show | Role | Notes |
|---|---|---|---|
| 2006 | The Curse of King Tut's Tomb | Jabari | |
| 2008 | Mumbai Calling | Call Centre Operator | Seven episodes |
| 2017 | Conan | Guest | |
| 2019 | Whiskey Cavalier | Jai Datta | Main Cast |
| 2019 | Koffee with Karan | Himself | Episode: Koffee Awards 2019 |
| 2020 | Fresh Off the Boat | DC | Episode: "The Magic Motor Inn" |

=== Web ===
| Year | Name | Platform | Notes |
|---|---|---|---|
| 2014 | Canvas Laugh Factory | YouTube | |
| 2017 | Abroad Understanding | Netflix | Stand-up special |
| 2018 | Losing It | Netflix | Stand-up special |
| 2019 | Jestination Unknown | Amazon Prime Video | Comedy series |
| 2020 | Hasmukh | Netflix | Writer and an actor |
| 2020 | For India | Netflix | Stand-up special |
| 2020 | Vir Das: Inside Out | Virdas.in | Stand-up special |
| 2020 | Vir Das: Outside In | Netflix | Stand-up special |
| 2022 | Vir Das: Landing | Netflix | Stand-up special |
| 2024 | Call Me Bae | Amazon Prime Video | Essayed the role of Satyajit Sen |
| 2025 | Vir Das: Fool Volume | Netflix | Stand-up special |

=== Books ===
- Das, Vir (2025). The Outsider: A Memoir for Misfits. New York: Simon & Schuster. ISBN 978-1668066324.

== See also ==
- List of Indian comedians
- List of stand-up comedians
