= Hasmukh =

- Genre: Crime; Dark comedy
- Written by: Nikkhil Advani; Vir Das; Nikhil Gonsalves; Suparn Verma; Anshul Singhal; Amogh Ranadive; Neeraj Pandey
- Directed by: Nikhil Gonsalves
- Starring: Vir Das; Ranvir Shorey; Manoj Pahwa
- Country of origin: India
- Original language: Hindi
- No. of seasons: 1
- No. of episodes: 10

Production
- Producers: Monisha Advani; Madhu Bhojwani; Nikkhil Advani; Vir Das; Sameer Nair
- Cinematography: Akash Agarwal
- Editors: Ninad Khanolkar; Arjun Srivastava
- Production companies: Emmay Entertainment; Applause Entertainment

Original release
- Network: Netflix
- Release: 17 April 2020

Hasmukh is an Indian dark comedy television series directed by Nikhil Gonsalves. Co-created and written by Nikkhil Advani and Vir Das, the series stars Das, Ranvir Shorey, Inaamulhaq, Amrita Bagchi, Ravi Kishan, and Manoj Pahwa. The story follows a small-town comedian who becomes a serial killer. Hasmukh premiered on Netflix on 17 April 2020.

== Cast ==
- Vir Das as Hasmukh
- Ranvir Shorey as Jimmy
- Amrita Bagchi as Promila
- Deeksha Sonalkar as Rhea
- Ravi Kishan as Mr. Sinha
- Manoj Pahwa as Gulati
- Raza Murad as Jameel Indori
- Suhail Nayyar as KK

== Episodes ==
No.	Title	Directed by	Written by	Original release date
1	"Pakodey Thande The"	Unknown	Unknown	17 April 2020
Hasmukh (Vir Das) is a comedy student working under a famous comedian Gulati (Manoj Pahwa) who has promised to give the former his break in stand up comedy but refuses to do so. Gulati is an alcoholic and fights with Hasmukh at a show which leads to Hasmukh eventually killing Gulati. A frightened Hasmukh goes to stage to do the show in place of Gulati and finds in himself a new fright and confidence and does the show very well. Gulati's manager, Jimmy (Ranvir Shorey) smells something wrong and goes to check on Gulati to find him dead. Jimmy fakes Gulati's death and instead becomes the manager of Hasmukh by wiping out the evidence of Gulati's murder.
2	"Ek Tha Azmat, Ek Thi Kismat"	Unknown	Unknown	17 April 2020
Now Jimmy starts taking shows for Hasmukh but both are a failure at the standups. Meanwhile, Hasmukh faces an oppressed life back at home where his uncle usually beats him up and his aunt is sexually attracted to him. After a lot of failed shows, Jimmy thinks that Hasmukh needs his 'Viagra' or the medicine for a perfect performance. Jimmy feels it's killing and so he orders in goat to be killed at a must perform show. Jimmy is being tortured by a local goon to make up money that has to be returned while Hasmukh is unable to think of a way to give a performance. Hasmukh's mind clicks when his uncle comes to mock him in his room. Hasmukh kills his uncle and gives an amazing performance on the stage. On the other side Jimmy stages that Hasmukh's uncle has run away and throws away his body in the furnace. Hasmukh then vows to not kill any good and innocent soul in order to give his stndup performances. Hasmukh next kills the PA of a corrupt evil politician, and that show goes viral on the internet...and attracts the eyes of a news channel named Alankar in Mumbai.
3	"Jimmy The Maker"	Unknown	Unknown	17 April 2020
The news channel owner (Ravi Kishan) gives a few days time to his workers to find a good eyecatcher for his show Comedy Baadshaho...the standup comedy show. Promila(Amrita Bagchi), one of the producers of the show lays her eyes on Hasmukh and how viral has gone. She decides to bring him in as a Wild Card Entry to the show, much to the dismay of Ajinkya, the other producer. Hasmukh is approached and he thinks that this is his chance to let his dreams come true. He leaves for Mumbai with his mentor and manager, Jimmy...while Jimmy starts pronouncing himself as the one who saw talent in Hasmukh and dubs himself as Jimmy, The Maker. After a fortunate accident, both negotiate to a 15lakhs per episode contract on contrary to the 25000 they were expecting. Both become really happy and throw a party to Ajinkya where a drunk Jimmy tells about their misunderstanding and the fortunate mistake to Ajinkya much to Hasmukh's dismay but Promila's right hand comes to their rescue. Jimmy later on tells Hasmukh to forget his past and move on in his life and to learn to live in the city of wicked, Mumbai. Next day on show Hasmukh is revealed as the Wild Card Entry much to the dismay of KK(Suhail Nayyar) who needs to win the show in order to repay some loans. It is shown in the end that KK has Ajinkya by his side as his sidekick.
4	"Bambai Main Bambu"	Unknown	Unknown	17 April 2020
The Alankar Channel Producer, Mr.Sinha(Ravi Kishan) holds a press conference to publicly apologize for molestation of a lady done by one of his actors. After the lady accepts the apology, Mr.Sinha rushes to his room along with his co-worker and lover whom he had been lusting for a lot of time. Meanwhile, Mrs.Sinha comes by and Promila rushes to rescue Mr.Sinha. On the other hand, Ajinkya is trying to get Jimmy and Hasmukh sign a contract of 5 lakh per episode instead of discussed 15 lakh per episode and adjoining Ajinkya is a lawyer named Shastri. After Promila rescues Mr.Sinha, Mrs.Sinha doubts her husband of having an affair, and orders a heavy jewellery for him to repent. Promila goes to rescue Hasmukh as well and realises Hasmukh of being forced to accept jokes written by someone else. He and Jimmy mock off Shastri after the contract signing. Mr.Sinha throws a party later that evening in honour of Hasmukh and both of them are introduced to a spoiled rich brat who had killed a few men in a drunken state by driving over them on footpath. They choose him to be their target for the first show on Comedy Baadshaho. On the other hand, a hurt Shastri vows to seek revenge, but is percepted [sic?] by goons of Jameel Indori, a don whom he has to pay money back. Shastri calls Jimmy and Hasmukh a few moments before their first show to an empty building and threatens Hasmukh to make him his manager under gunpoint. Hasmukh manages to kill Shastri and reach for show on time. He goes to the stage and begins the show on a high note where everyone likes his performance. His rival KK is upset about it while Promila is happy about it. But the end does not go well as Hasmukh is distracted from his joke, which is about contract signing. The performance ends at a low note making KK happy and Promila not satisfied. Also, there is a budding romance between Riya and Jimmy.
5	"Case Closed"	Unknown	Unknown	17 April 2020
Although Hasmukh wins the round by just one point, Promila and Mr.Sinha are not happy with the performance. Promila blackmails Mr.Sinha into giving one more chance to Hasmukh. Meanwhile, police investigates the death of Shastri and gets a lead towards Hasmukh. Although the senior police officer is confirmed that the murder has been committed by Jameel Indori. Jimmy and Riya share romantic feelings while Hasmukh buds some romance with Riya's roommate. But Hasmukh has hauntings of Jameel Indori's men coming to kill them as they lied to police. Hasmukh also has a haunting of the man he hates the most, Gulati. He decides in his mind to leave Mumbai. And tells about it to Jimmy. Later in the day, they witness KK begging for mercy from some person. Riya tells it's Jameel Indori (Raza Murad) and tells horrifying stories about him. Jimmy and Hasmukh decide to kill him for the next show and so they go to meet him. But instead finds him to be a very good man who is very much against women harassment and treats everyone equally involved in the crime. Hasmukh kills the actor who had been harassing the woman and devotes his performance to women empowerment. He wins everyone's heart on the show and is confirmed of winning. The episode ends when police comes to Hasmukh telling him that they have caught his lies as Indori's men were in Hyderabad on the day of murder.
6	"Hum Acche Aadmi Nahin Hain"	Unknown	Unknown	17 April 2020
7	"Machalte Huye Hormones"	Unknown	Unknown	17 April 2020
8	"Peti Killer"	Unknown	Unknown	17 April 2020
9	"Ek Writer Ki Maut"	Unknown	Unknown	17 April 2020
10	"Sab Samay Ka Khel Hai"	Unknown	Unknown	17 April 2020

== Controversy ==
A petition was filed against the show in the Delhi High Court, by two lawyers, who claimed that the series "maligned the legal profession". The plea for an interim injunction against the show was subsequently dismissed by the court, as it observed that "the very essence of democracy is that a creative artist is given the liberty to project the picture of the society in a manner he perceives". Das expressed his gratitude towards the court in a statement and claimed that the show had become the "subject of 'close to 10 legal notices', a lawsuit, as well as down-voting campaigns on IMDb organised by political pages".

In 2021, in an interview with DeadAnt, Das revealed that the court had also officially defined the job of a stand-up comedian in its ruling, stating, "The job of a comedian is to take it to ridiculous places, to make it absurd, any resemblance it is not to be taken seriously, doesn’t warrant legal action".
