= The Adventures of Hatim =

Television series

- Genre: Action; Adventure; Fantasy
- Created by: Nikhil Sinha
- Written by: Sarang Mahajan Yashwant mahilwar
- Directed by: Ismail Umar Khan, J.P. Sharma
- Starring: Rajbeer Singh; Pooja Banerjee; Krishna Singh Bisht
- Theme music composer: Bharat/Saurabh
- Opening theme: "Hatim"
- Country of origin: India
- Original language: Hindi
- No. of episodes: 68

Production
- Executive producer: Sohanna Sinha
- Producer: Nikhil Sinha
- Production location: India
- Editor: Randhir Jha
- Running time: 42–90 minutes
- Production company: Triangle Films Company

Original release
- Network: Life OK
- Release: 28 December 2013 – 31 August 2014

The Adventures of Hatim is an Indian fantasy television series which was premiered on 28 December 2013. The story revolves around the popular folktales of Hatim al-Tai, as a Prince of Yemen, who goes on a journey to solve 7 riddles in order to destroy the evil sorcerer Zargam. The series stars Rajbeer Singh, Pooja Banerjee and Krishna Singh Bisht.

== Cast ==
- Rajbeer Singh as Hatim Tai
- Pooja Banerjee as Perizaad
- Krishna Singh Bisht as Kasim
- Chandan K Anand as General Zargam of Arzaan
- Ashish Dixit as Jangal ka Shikari Veerbhadra
- Manoj Kolhatkar as Lakha the hunchback
- Dolly Sohi as Queen Shazia of Yaman
- Pracheen Chauhan as Prince Hassan of Yaman
- Nausheen Ali Sardar as Queen Ruda
- Sachin Tyagi as King Hubal
- Anjali Abrol as Queen Khwaish of Ashkaar
- Riyanka Chanda as Naaz Pari
- Khalid Siddiqui as King Naushwerwaan of Ashkaar
- Alihassan Turabi as Khabees
- Narayani Shastri as Neena
- Kishwer Merchant as vampiress Zelna
- Reena Aggarwal as Safina
- Anang Desai as King Nomaad of Ishtiyaar
- Anil Rastogi as prisoner in Forest of Death
- Jay Thakkar as Rakhban
- Devesh Ahuja as Prince Rustom
- Kamya Panjabi as Chudail Rihana
- Akanksha Juneja as Princess Gull
- Kalyani Badeka as Maya
- Ananya Agarwal as Princess
- Deepali Muchrikar as Witch Haseena
- Neena Cheema as Witch Afsana
- Pooran Kiri as Jurgaal
- Akhil Mishra as Amaan's father
- Amit Behl as Surebo
- Jasveer Kaur as Mundra
- Jiten Lalwani as Bilmus
- Deepshikha Nagpal as Witch Khilkhil
- Manish Khanna as Shaitan Groban
- Sara Khan as Roshni
- Nigaar Khan as Witch Mallika
- Rajesh Khera as Akaa

== Episode list ==
Episode number	Episode title	Air date
1	Zargam kills Nausherwan	28 December 2013
2	Hatim defeats Kaala Saaya	29 December 2013
3	Zargam orders Hatim's killing	4 January 2014
4	Hatim to avenge Hasan's death	5 January 2014
5	Hatim vows to take revenge	11 January 2014
6	A fakir demands Hatim's tawiz	12 January 2014
7	Hatim enters World of Truth	18 January 2014
8	Hatim confronts a werewolf	19 January 2014
9	Hatim kills Zelna	26 January 2014
10	Hatim decides to save the Akaara	1 February 2014
11	Perizaad, Shambhak fall off cliff	2 February 2014
12	Hatim rescues Perizaad	8 February 2014
13	Hatim, Perizaad spend time	9 February 2014
14	Hatim confronts Zargam	15 February 2014
15	Zargam holds Perizad as captive	16 February 2014
16	Zargam challenges Hatim	22 February 2014
17	Zargam, Hatim were bothers	23 February 2014
18	Hatim defeats Koiba	1 March 2014
19	Hasan tries to kill Hatim	2 March 2014
20	Laka separates Hatim and Perizaad	8 March 2014
21	Tauzar kidnaps Perizaad and Kasim	9 March 2014
22	Hatim arrives at Tehelkanaaz	15 March 2014
23	Hatim finds Rakhbir's den	16 March 2014
24	Hatim defeats Kirtaf	22 March 2014
25	Rakhbir gifts Hatim a book	23 March 2014
26	Will Hatim reach Ilaha's buddh?	29 March 2014
27	Hatim defeats Tahimir	30 March 2014
28	Buddh-E-Ilaha for Tahimir	5 April 2014
29	Hatim answers questions	6 April 2014
30	Rehana confronts Zargam	12 April 2014
31	Rehana for fruit of Ibnehashi	13 April 2014
32	Hatim saves Kasim from Bilbis	19 April 2014
33	Hatim rescues King Afroz	20 April 2014
34	Hatim defeats Rehana	26 April 2014
35	The secret of Vadi-E-Babuniya	27 April 2014
36	A devil attacks Hatim and Kasim	3 May 2014
37	Haseena and Afsana capture Kasim	4 May 2014
38	Haseena enslaves Kasim	10 May 2014
39	Hatim regains his eyesight	11 May 2014
40	King Auran captures Hatim	17 May 2014
41	Perizaad defeats Sulsula	18 May 2014
42	Sultan gives Aina-E-Zindagi	24 May 2014
43	Princess Gul becomes Khabooshi	25 May 2014
44	Jumman tries to save Hatim	1 Jun 2014
45	Hatim finds the fourth answer	8 Jun 2014
46	Hatim was Arsalan in past life	14 Jun 2014
47	Hatim gets a boon of self-healing	15 Jun 2014
48	Kasim and Perizaad get captured	21 Jun 2014
49	Zargam had killed his parents	22 Jun 2014
50	Zargam for Zulm-E-Tabahi	29 Jun 2014
51	Hatim destroys Zargam	5 July 2014
52	Hatim destroys the dacoits	6 July 2014
53	Hatim finds Ergan's treasure	12 July 2014
54	Hatim helps the Lilliputs	13 July 2014
55	Hatim saves Sarjil from Surebo	19 July 2014
56	Hatim kills Queen Mundra	20 July 2014
57	Hatim confronts the witches	26 July 2014
58	Hatim confronts Bilmoos	27 July 2014
59	Hatim goes on a mission	2 August 2014
60	Hatim rescues Rooba from Khilkhil	3 August 2014
61	Hatim is kidnapped	9 August 2014
62	Hatim defeats Kutila	10 August 2014
63	Hatim turns into a child	16 August 2014
64	Hatim saves the princess	17 August 2014
65	A witch turns children into dolls	23 August 2014
66	Hatim rescues Aks’ soul	24 August 2014
67	Hatim fights Zargam	30 August 2014
68	Hatim jumps into a volcano	31 August 2014
