= Ninad Kamat =

Indian Bollywood film actor

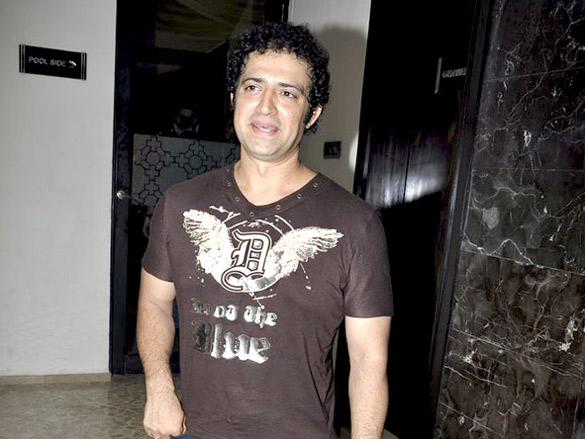
- Ninad Kamat in 2011
- Born: Mumbai, Maharashtra, India
- Occupations: Actor, Dubbing Artist
- Years active: 1994–present

Ninad Kamat is an Indian actor who works in Hindi films. Some of his films include Parineeta (2005), Lage Raho Munnabhai (2006), Laaga Chunari Mein Daag (2007) and Jai Gangaajal (2016). He is also a dubbing artist and has dubbed for Amitabh Bachchan, Sachin Tendulkar, Will Smith, and Jim Carrey.

== Filmography ==
=== Films ===
Year	Film	Role
1997	Tunnu Ki Tina	
1998	Doli Saja Ke Rakhna	Peter
1999	Sangharsh	Abu
2005	Zeher	James
2005	Parineeta	Ajit
2005	7½ Phere	
2005	Dus	Roy
2005	Viruddh	Sahil
2006	Shiva	Bollywood
2006	Lage Raho Munna Bhai	Advocate
2006	Shoonya	Ashwin
2007	Laaga Chunari Mein Daag	Karan
2007	Dhamaal	Host
2008	Chamku	Lyndoh
2010	Dus Tola	Bholenath
2011	Force	Vasu
2011	Ra.One	Game instructor (voice-over)
2012	Bachelor Party	Suri
2016	One Night Stand	David
2016	Airlift	Kurien
2016	Jai Gangaajal	Dabloo Pandey
2017	Behen Hogi Teri	Jaydev
2019	Upstarts	Kapil's boss
2019	Ramprasad Ki Tehrvi	Manoj
2022	Maja Ma	Moolchand Adhia
2023	Friday Night Plan	SI Sunhas Pingale
2026	Candy and the Pizza Ggirl	

=== Television ===
Year	Serial	Role
1994	Campus	Shakti
1994	Grihalakshmi Ka Jinn	
1996-1997	Gopaljee	Somu
1995-1998	Sailaab	Ashish
1998-1999	Gudgudee	Raghu
1995-1997	Imtihaan	
2005	Home Sweet Home	Sandy
2019	Criminal Justice	Sunil Bhandarkar
2023	Scoop	Jagmohan Guha
2025	Saare Jahan Se Accha: The Silent Guardians	Nirmal Raibhan Adhikari

=== As playback singer ===
Year	Film	Song
2019	Ramprasad Ki Tehrvi	''Ek Adhura Kaam Hai''
2008	One Two Three	''Lakshmi Narayan''
2006	Shiva	''Police Police''
2003	Darna Mana Hai	''Darna Mana Hai'' and ''Darna Mana Hai Remix''

== Dubbing ==
=== Animated series ===
Program	Original voice(s)	Character(s)	No. of episodes	Dub language	Original language	Original airdate	Dub airdate	Notes
The Mask: Animated Series	Rob Paulsen	Stanley Ipkiss / The Mask	54	Hindi	English	August 12, 1995 – August 30, 1997		

=== Live action films ===
Film title	Actor(s)	Character(s)	Dub language	Original language	Original Year release	Dub Year release	Notes
The Mask of Zorro	Antonio Banderas	Alejandro Murrieta / Zorro	Hindi	English	1998	1998	Rajesh Khattar dubbed this character in The Legend of Zorro
Mission: Impossible	Jean Reno	Franz Krieger	Hindi	English	1996	1996	
Mission: Impossible 2	Anthony Hopkins	Mission Commander Swanbeck (uncredited cameo)	Hindi	English	2000	2000	
The Phantom	Treat Williams	Xander Drax	Hindi	English	1996	1996	
Stuart Little	Chazz Palminteri	Smokey (voice)	Hindi	English	1999	1999	
Men in Black	Will Smith	James Darrell Edwards III / Agent J	Hindi	English	1997	1997	
Men in Black II	Will Smith	James Darrell Edwards III / Agent J	Hindi	English	2002	2002	Amar Babaria dubbed this character in next film.
xXx	Vin Diesel	Xander Cage / xXx	Hindi	English	2002	2002	Sharad Kelkar dubbed this character in next film.
Guardians of the Galaxy Vol. 2	Bradley Cooper	Rocket (voice)	Hindi	English	2017	2017	Ashiesh Roy dubbed this character in previous film.
Avengers: Infinity War	Josh Brolin	Thanos	Hindi	English	2018	2018	Ninad had voiced 2 characters in the Hindi dub.
Avengers: Infinity War	Bradley Cooper	Rocket (voice)	Hindi	English	2018	2018	Ninad had voiced 2 characters in the Hindi dub.
Avengers: Endgame	Josh Brolin	Thanos	Hindi	English	2019	2019	Ninad had voiced 2 characters in the Hindi dub.
Avengers: Endgame	Bradley Cooper	Rocket (voice)	Hindi	English	2019	2019	Ninad had voiced 2 characters in the Hindi dub.

=== Live-Action series ===
Program	Original voice(s)	Character(s)	No. of episodes	Dub language	Original language	Original airdate	Dub airdate	Notes
Spider-Noir	Nicolas Cage	Ben Reilly/The Spider	8	Hindi	English	28-5-2026	28-5-2026	Streaming on Prime Video.
