= Vir Das: Landing =

- Genre: Stand-up comedy
- Written by: Vir Das
- Starring: Vir Das
- Country of origin: India
- Original languages: Hindi; English

Production
- Cinematography: Jay Oza; Seamus Tierney
- Production company: Rotten Science

Original release
- Network: Netflix
- Release: 26 December 2023

Vir Das: Landing is a stand-up comedy special directed and written by the Indian actor and comedian Vir Das. The show is available for streaming on Netflix.

The special won the International Emmy Award for Best Comedy Series at the 51st International Emmy Awards. This was Das's second nomination and first win, as he shared the trophy with the British sitcom Derry Girls.

== Synopsis ==
Vir Das is an Indian comedian, actor, and musician. In this stand-up show filmed in New York, he reflects on his childhood in India, controversies and his move to America.

== Release ==
Vir Das: Landing premiered on Netflix on 26 December 2022.

== Critical reception ==
Suchin Mehrotra, from Hindustan Times, wrote that "Vir Das: Landing is an uneven but heartfelt mix of fun and emotion that will break your heart in the most rewarding way (...) and [Vir Das] proves that he’s at his best, not when he’s provoking laughs, but when they stop".
