= Shazia Iqbal =

Indian filmmaker

- Born: 1984 (age 41–42); Patna, Bihar, India
- Education: MetFilm School
- Years active: 2010–present
- Notable work: Bebaak, Dhadak 2

Shazia Iqbal (born 1984) is an Indian filmmaker.

== Early life and education ==
Shazia was born in Patna, Bihar, in 1984 to a Muslim family. She graduated as an architect, then later attended MetFilm School.

== Career ==
Shazia worked in advertising before entering film industry. She started her career in the film industry as production designer. Her debut short film as director was Bebaak. It won the Best Short Film (Fiction) award in 65th Filmfare Awards. It also won the Audience Choice Award for Best Short at the Indian Film Festival of Los Angeles. Her first feature film is Dhadak 2.

== Filmography ==
| Year | Film | Credited as | | | Notes |
| Year | Film | Director | Writer | Production Designer | Notes |
|---|---|---|---|---|---|
| 2010 | Rishta.com | | | ✓ | TV series |
| 2011 | Dum Maaro Dum | | | ✓ | |
| 2012 | Housefull 2 | | | ✓ | |
| 2014 | Kuku Mathur Ki Jhand Ho Gayi | | | ✓ | |
| 2017 | Mukkabaaz | | | ✓ | |
| 2018 | Lust Stories | | | ✓ | Anthology film |
| 2018 | Sacred Games | | | ✓ | TV series |
| 2019 | Bebaak | ✓ | ✓ | | Short film |
| 2024 | Love Storiyaan | ✓ | ✓ | | Documentary series |
| 2025 | Dhadak 2 | ✓ | ✓ | | |
