= Kaamyaab =

2018 Indian film by Hardik Mehta

- Theatrical release poster
- Directed by: Hardik Mehta
- Written by: Radhika Anand
- Story by: Hardik Mehta
- Produced by: Gauri Khan; Manish Mundra; Gaurav Verma
- Starring: Sanjay Mishra; Deepak Dobriyal; Isha Talwar; Nasirr Khan
- Cinematography: Piyush Puty
- Edited by: Prashanth Ramachandran Jayalaxmi
- Music by: Rachita Arora
- Production companies: Red Chillies Entertainment; Drishyam Films
- Distributed by: Zee Studios
- Release dates: 5 October 2018 (Busan); 6 March 2020
- Running time: 120 minutes
- Country: India
- Language: Hindi

Kaamyaab (transl. Successful, English title: Round Figure) is a 2018 Indian Hindi-language drama film directed and written by Hardik Mehta, and produced by Red Chillies Entertainment and Drishyam Films. The film stars Sanjay Mishra and Deepak Dobriyal with Isha Talwar, Nasirr Khan and Sarika Singh appearing in supporting roles. It is the story of a washed up “side-actor” of Hindi movies, who wants to make a comeback with a memorable role so that he can complete a record figure of acting in 500 films.

== Plot ==
Kaamyaab is the journey of Sudheer, a washed up side actor from the heyday of Bollywood. Years after his retirement, he realises that he ‘retired’ on the verge of accomplishing a unique record. He decides to come out of his retirement to complete the round figure of 500 and get that one substantial role for which he will be remembered forever.

== Cast ==
- Sanjay Mishra as Babulal Chandola / Sudheer
- Deepak Dobriyal as Gulati
- Isha Talwar as Isha
- Nasirr Khan as Director Barot
- Sarika Singh as Bhavna, Babu's daughter
- Avtar Gill as Himself
- Viju Khote as Himself
- Manmauji as Himself
- Guddi Maruti as Herself
- Anil Nagrath as Himself
- Birbal as Himself
- Lilliput as Himself
- Devas Dixit as Casting Assistant
- Akashdeep Arora as Shibu Sunder Das
- Devika Vatsa as Casting Assistant
- Kaurwakee Vasistha as Anu
- Shehzad Khan as Himself
- Vikas Verma as Rahul Chopra

== Soundtrack ==
Kaamyaab

Soundtrack album by Rachita Arora
- Released: 26 February 2020
- Recorded: 2018–19
- Genre: Feature film soundtrack
- Length: 11:54
- Language: Hindi
- Label: Zee Music Company
External audio
- Official Audio Jukebox on YouTube

The film's songs are composed by Rachita Arora, with lyrics written by Neeraj Pandey.

Track listing
No.	Title	Lyrics	Singer(s)	Length
1.	"Tim Tim Tim"	Neeraj Pandey	Bappi Lahiri	4:32
2.	"Paaon Bhaari"	Neeraj Pandey	Ash King	4:29
3.	"Sikandar"	Neeraj Pandey	Hariharan	2:53
Total length:				11:54

== Marketing and release ==
The official announcement for Har Kisse Ke Hisse... Kaamyaab was made by Red Chillies Entertainment on 31 January 2020. Presented by Red Chillies Entertainment, a Drishyam Films production, the film is produced by Gauri Khan, Manish Mundra and Gaurav Verma, and directed by Hardik Mehta.

The film had its world premiere at the 23rd Busan International Film Festival on 5 October 2018. It was released theatrically in India on 6 March 2020.

The film was made available for streaming on Netflix on 3 May 2020.

== Reception ==
=== Critical response ===
On the review aggregator website Rotten Tomatoes, 100% of 5 critics' reviews are positive, with an average rating of 6.3/10.

Pallabi Dey Purkayastha of Times of India gave 4.5/5 rating and termed it as an 'ode to Bollywood'. She found the tonality of the narrative light, subtle, funny and emotional. Praising writer-director Hardik Mehta for his writing, and the ensemble cast for their performance she concluded that the film was about ability to fulfill dreams, even when the things are not going your way.

=== Awards and nominations ===
Year	Award	Category	Recipient(s)	Result	Ref.
2021	Filmfare Awards	Best Film (Critics)	Hardik Mehta	Nominated	
2021	Filmfare Awards	Best Story	Hardik Mehta	Nominated	
2021	Filmfare Awards	Best Actor (Critics)	Sanjay Mishra	Nominated	
