= Kacchey Limbu =

2022 Indian sports drama film

- Official release poster
- Directed by: Shubham Yogi
- Written by: Shubham Yogi; Sharanya Rajgopal; Sukanya Subramaniyan; Neeraj Pandey
- Produced by: Jyoti Deshpande; Pranjal Khandhdiya; Neha Anand
- Starring: Radhika Madan; Rajat Barmecha; Ayush Mehra
- Cinematography: Piyush Puty
- Edited by: Mitesh Soni
- Music by: Anshul Takkar
- Production companies: Jio Studios; Mango People Media
- Distributed by: JioCinema
- Release dates: 12 September 2022 (Toronto); 19 May 2023 (India)
- Running time: 106 minutes
- Country: India
- Language: Hindi

Kacchey Limbu (transl. Unripe Lemons) is a 2022 Indian Hindi-language sports drama film written and directed by Shubham Yogi on his directorial debut. It stars Radhika Madan, Rajat Barmecha, and Ayush Mehra in the lead roles. The film explores the lives of siblings-brother and sister-who are cricket crazy and their bond.

The film premiered at the 2022 Toronto International Film Festival and received rave reviews. The film was also screened at the World Film Festival of Bangkok and the International Film Festival of Kerala. The film began streaming on JioCinema on 19 May 2023.

== Synopsis ==
Aditi, who has grown up in the shadow of her brother who was often sidelined earlier due to social norms and restrictions for a typical Indian girl. Meanwhile, Aditi initially wanted to be a fashion designer, but her father wanted her to study medicine and a become doctor. Aditi makes a challenge to his elder brother Aakash, which eventually is going to decide the future pathway of his life, as Aditi bets that if she wins against him in the gully cricket tournament, Akash has to obey his father's wish of attending regular corporate job interviews thereby putting his cricket dream away. Initially, Akash got the green light from his father who encouraged him to take up the sport from childhood but later opposed it as he gave up the hope that his son wouldn't be better if he chose to stick with gully cricket and forced Akash to attend job interviews. Akash clearly had one goal in his life which was to play for the Indian cricket team one day.

Hence, the challenge is set to be a make or break moment for Akash and he accepts to play against his sister in the gully cricket tournament, with perspective-altering results. Aditi somehow manages to assemble a team of rookies and new faces to battle in the gully cricket league against her brother. Aditi even pulls one of his brother's former teammates to form her team, and she names her team Kacchey Limbu. Initially, the Kacchey Limbu team looked clueless and thin on paper but eventually became a competent team, which gave a run for its money to other teams in the league.

== Cast ==
- Radhika Madan as Aditi Nath, Aakash's younger sister
- Rajat Barmecha as Aakash Nath, Aditi's elder brother
- Ayush Mehra as Kabir Saini
- Mahesh Thakur as Ajit Nath, Aakash and Aditi's father
- Purva Parag as Anjali Nath, Aakash and Aditi's mother
- Jaywant Wadkar as Sudhakar Uncle
- Faiz Khan as Zakir
- Vedaansh Jaju as Yuvi
- Aisha Ahmed as Sara
- Sukhita Aiyar as Kavita Ma'm
- Shreya Kapoor as Charvi
- Tanushree Das as Ira
- Pradeep Nigam as building secretary and commentator

== Critical reception ==
On the review aggregator website Rotten Tomatoes, 67% of 6 critics' reviews are positive, with an average rating of 6/10.
