= Indian Language School =

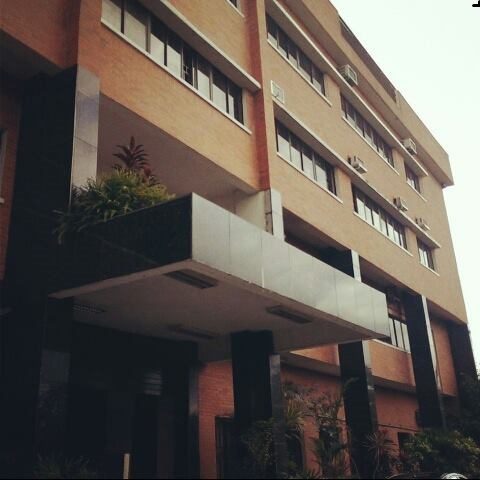
- The Main entrance to Indian Language School, established in 1982

Location
- Ilupeju, Lagos, Nigeria; 6.55188°N 3.36416°E

Information
- School type: Private school
- Established: 1982

The Indian Language School was established in Lagos, Nigeria in 1982 in light of the growing Indian community in the city. The school is under the Indian high commission in Nigeria and managed by a Board of Trustees made up of prominent businesspeople.

It was originally set up in a residential neighborhood at 11 Johnson Street, Illupeju, Lagos. The school began as converted residences — with three floors, a playground, a football court, a basketball court, and a volleyball court. Over the past few years, the school has expanded significantly, acquiring nearby properties, thus catering to the large number of students that enroll with the school each year. This is currently the only Indian school in Lagos and offers education till 12th standard. It has classes from LKG to 12 and has been holding CBSE Board Examinations for Grades 10 and 12, since the late 1980s.

In 2024, allegations arose on social media that the school only accepted Indian nationals as students and did not allow Nigerians to be admitted; a correspondent from The Punch visited to confirm the claims and was denied entry by a receptionist and a security guard, who asked if the children he was seeking admission for had an Indian relative. The Lagos state government announced that it would investigate the matter, while a representative of the Indian high commission stated that the staff who denied the journalist entry would be sanctioned.

== Organization ==
Approximately 3,000 students are registered. The school follows the Central Board of Secondary Education curriculum and helps Indian students residing in Lagos the most populated city in Nigeria to transition into higher education programs. The current principal of the school is Sonali Rajan-Gupta. The former principal, Ms Suman Kanwar was principal from 1985 to 2013.

== Alumni ==
- Vir Das – Indian actor and comedian

== See also ==
- India–Nigeria relations
