= Ramprasad Ki Tehrvi =

2019 Indian film by Seema Pahwa

- Theatrical release poster
- Directed by: Seema Pahwa
- Written by: Seema Pahwa
- Produced by: Jio Studios; Drishyam Films
- Starring: Naseeruddin Shah; Vinay Pathak; Vikrant Massey; Konkona Sen Sharma; Vineet Kumar; Manoj Pahwa; Parambrata Chattopadhyay; Supriya Pathak; Deepika Amin; Ninad Kamat
- Cinematography: Sudip Sengupta
- Edited by: Dipika Kalra
- Music by: Sagar Desai
- Production companies: Drishyam Films; Jio Studios
- Distributed by: UFO Moviez
- Release dates: 17 October 2019 (Mumbai Film Festival); 1 January 2021 (India)
- Running time: 113 minutes
- Country: India
- Language: Hindi
- Box office: 0.27 crore

Ramprasad Ki Tehrvi is a 2019 Indian Hindi-language family drama film directed by Seema Pahwa and produced by Jio Studios and Drishyam Films. It features an ensemble cast of Naseeruddin Shah, Vikrant Massey, Konkona Sen Sharma, Parambrata Chatterjee, Vinay Pathak, Supriya Pathak, Manoj Pahwa, and Vineet Kumar. The film also marks the directorial debut for actress Seema Pahwa, who also wrote the film, based on her own play, Pind Daan.

The film premiered at the Mumbai Film Festival on 17 October 2019. It was released theatrically on 1 January 2021.

== Synopsis ==
Ramprasad's entire family gathers at their ancestral home in Lucknow for 13 days after his death, to perform Pind Daan an after-life ritual that is performed after someone's demise and observe the Hindu traditions and death rituals called the tehrvi. During the course, the family's dynamics, politics, and insecurities come out, and then they realise that the importance of people and things are only evident in retrospect.

== Cast ==
- Naseeruddin Shah as Ramprasad Bhargava (Bauji)
  - Parambrata Chattopadhyay as Young Ramprasad Bhargava
- Supriya Pathak as Amma (Mrs. Bhargava - Ramprasad's wife)
  - Sanah Kapur as Young Amma
- Konkona Sen Sharma as Seema Bhargava (Nishant's wife)
- Parambrata Chattopadhyay as Nishant Bhargava aka Neetu (Ramprasad's youngest son)
- Vikrant Massey as Rahul Bhargava (Gajraj's son)
- Manoj Pahwa as Gajraj Bhargava (Ramprasad's eldest son)
- Ninad Kamat as Manoj Bhargava (Ramprasad's second son)
- Vinay Pathak as Pankaj Bhargava (Ramprasad's third son)
- Deepika Amin as Sushma Bhargava (Gajraj's wife)
- Divya Jagdale as Sulekha Bhargava (Manoj's wife)
- Sadiya Siddiqui as Pratibha Bhargava (Pankaj's wife)
- Anubha Fatehpura as Rani (Ramprasad's elder daughter)
- Sarika Singh as Dhaani (Ramprasad's younger daughter)
- Brijendra Kala as Prakash (Rani's husband)
- Shrikant Verma as Basant (Dhaani's husband)
- Rajendra Gupta as Tauji (Mr. Bhargava - Ramprasad's elder brother)
- Pushpa Joshi as Bua Ji (Ramprasad's elder sister)
- Vineet Kumar as Mamaji (Amma's brother)
- Alka Kaushal as Sheila (neighbour)
- Manukriti Pahwa as Bitto (Sheila's daughter)
- Sawan Tank as Samay Bhargava (Manoj's son)
- Neivan Ahuja as Saksham
- Yamini Das as Mamiji
- Mahesh Sharma as Vinod Bhargava (Tauji's son, who also drives him around)

== Release ==
The film premiered at Mumbai Film Festival in Mumbai on 17 October 2019.

The film was released theatrically on 1 January 2021.

== Soundtrack ==
Ramprasad Ki Tehrvi

Soundtrack album by Sagar Desai
- Released: 28 December 2020
- Recorded: 2019–20
- Genre: Feature film soundtrack
- Length: 16:20
- Language: Hindi
- Label: Jio Studios

The film's soundtrack was composed by Sagar Desai, while lyrics were written by Neeraj Pandey.

All lyrics are written by Neeraj Pandey.

No.	Title	Lyrics	Singers	Length
1.	"Bulawa Aaya Re"	Neeraj Pandey	K. Mohan, Abhigyan Dasgupta, Sagar Desai	4:47
2.	"Aisa Hai Kyun"	Neeraj Pandey	Neeraj Pandey, Rachita Arora	3:47
3.	"Ek Adhoora Kaam"	Neeraj Pandey	Arnab Chakraborty, Ninad Kamat	3:36
4.	"Jo Ghum Hua Ha"		Sapna Sand	4:10
Total length:				16:20

== Critical reception ==
On the review aggregator website Rotten Tomatoes, 78% of 9 critics' reviews are positive, with an average rating of 6.1/10.

== Awards and nominations ==
Year	Award	Category	Recipient(s)	Result	Ref.
2022	Filmfare Awards	Best Film	Drishyam Films, Jio Studios	Nominated	
2022	Filmfare Awards	Best Film (Critics)	Seema Pahwa	Nominated	
2022	Filmfare Awards	Best Director	Seema Pahwa	Nominated	
2022	Filmfare Awards	Best Debut Director	Seema Pahwa	Won	
2022	Filmfare Awards	Best Story	Seema Pahwa	Nominated	
2022	Filmfare Awards	Best Actress (Critics)	Supriya Pathak	Nominated	
2022	Filmfare Awards	Best Supporting Actress	Konkona Sen Sharma	Nominated	
