= Perfect Bride =

Indian reality TV series

- Genre: Reality show
- Country of origin: India
- Original language: Hindi
- No. of seasons: 1

Original release
- Network: StarPlus
- Release: 12 September – 12 December 2009

Perfect Bride is an Indian reality show that aired on STAR Plus adapted from the American show Momma's Boys. It premiered on 12 September 2009, and follows five bridegrooms as they choose their brides from a panel of eleven potential candidates. The winning girl and her choice of partner would win a monetary prize. Hitesh Chauhan and Rumpa Roy won the show on 12 December 2009.

== Cast ==
- Romit Raj: Host
- Shekhar Suman: Judge (Rishton ke paarkhi)
- Amrita Rao: Judge (Rishton ke paarkhi)
- Malaika Arora: Judge (Rishton ke paarkhi)
- Rajbeer Singh: Contestant (the groom)
- Manik Goswami
