= Mrs. (film) =

2023 Indian film by Arati Kadav

- OTT Release Poster
- Directed by: Arati Kadav
- Screenplay by: Harman Baweja; Anu Singh Choudhary
- Based on: The Great Indian Kitchen by Jeo Baby
- Produced by: Harman Baweja; Pammi Baweja; Smitha Baliga; Abdul Aziz Makani; Jyoti Deshpande
- Starring: Sanya Malhotra; Nishant Dahiya; Kanwaljit Singh
- Cinematography: Pratham Mehta
- Edited by: Prerna Saigal
- Music by: Sagar Desai; Faizan Hussain
- Production companies: Jio Studios; Baweja Studios
- Distributed by: ZEE5
- Release dates: 17 November 2023 (BNFF); 7 February 2025
- Running time: 111 minutes
- Country: India
- Language: Hindi

Mrs. is an Indian Hindi-language drama film directed by Arati Kadav. It is a remake of the 2021 Malayalam film The Great Indian Kitchen, and stars Sanya Malhotra as a newly-wed woman who has to navigate regressive patriarchal traditions.

Mrs. premiered at the 2023 Tallinn Black Nights Film Festival., next it was screened at 2024 Indian Film Festival of Melbourne and was also screened at the New York Indian Film Festival. It was released directly on OTT platform ZEE5 on 7 February 2025. The film received positive reviews from critics with praise for Malhotra's performance.

== Plot ==
Richa, an educated dancer, finds herself in an arranged marriage to Diwakar, a doctor in a very traditional and patriarchal family. While her domestic routine begins in the sweet bliss of a new marriage, things begin to go south. The drudgery of the kitchen and its many unpleasantries — cleaning, utensils and leaking taps — are left to the women while the men mostly indulge themselves with their phone or yoga. The family is so patriarchal that her mother-in-law hands the toothbrush to the father-in-law, while he is lounging by the verandah. The men eat their meals first and leaves the place a mess without concern for how the women can eat food after them. Despite her initial adjustments to the duties of the kitchen, little does Richa know that the real trouble would begin once her mother-in-law is compelled to leave for some time.

Diwakar's attitude towards Richa has also slowly begun to change; while he once adored her for her "kitchen smell", he ignores her pleas for repair work in the kitchen and later, when forcibly trying to have sex with her in order to get her pregnant, he rebuffs her demands for intimacy. Her father-in-law forbids her from finding employment, citing that a woman in the house brings prosperity to the family. When she gets her periods, she is appalled to discover that the family's beliefs regarding menstruation are extremely regressive, but enjoys her time alone. She is left alone to handle guests, their backhanded patriarchal comments and the trauma of being away from all her life used to be.

Shortly after Diwakar asks her to delete her dance videos from her social media accounts, Richa wonders if being in this marriage is worth it. During a birthday party for her father-in-law, she eventually broods over the burden of it and finally decides to avenge the trauma by serving guests the dirty leakage water from the kitchen sink as a beverage. Diwakar strides towards the kitchen in anger with his father right behind him, only for Richa, who is ready with the bucket of leakage water, to fling it onto Diwakar in frustration as she storms out of the house without the guests noticing, implying she would divorce him. The film ends with a scene showing Richa as an independent dance teacher portraying her pains through a dance routine while Diwakar is married again and the second wife seems happy to serve them, blissfully unaware of the horrors that await her.

== Cast ==
- Sanya Malhotra as Richa Sharma
- Nishant Dahiya as Diwakar Kumar
- Kanwaljit Singh as Dr. Ashwin Kumar, Diwakar's father
- Aparna Ghoshal as Meena Kumar, Diwakar's mother
- Nitya Moyal as Saavi
- Viraj Mundkar as Vedprakash
- Varun Badola as Tunnu Bhaiya
- Loveleen Mishra as Nirjala, Diwakar's aunt
- Harshika Kewalramani as Bubbles
- Mrinal Kulkarni as Richa's mother
- Girish Dhamija as Richa's father
- Gulsita as Saavi's mother
- Aaryan Arora as Richa's brother

== Production ==
Mrs. is a remake of the 2021 Malayalam film The Great Indian Kitchen by Jeo Baby. Director Arati Kadav wished to make the original accessible to North Indian audiences.

== Soundtrack ==
Mrs.

Soundtrack album by Sagar Desai and Faizan Hussain
- Released: 28 January 2025
- Genre: Feature film soundtrack
- Length: 12:15
- Language: Hindi
- Label: Zee Music Company

Official audio
- Mrs. Full Album on YouTube

The music of the film is composed by Sagar Desai and Faizan Hussain while lyrics are written by Neeraj Pandey, Arun Kumar, Pallavi Bhardwaj Hussain, and Arun Kumar.

Track listing
No.	Title	Lyrics	Music	Singer(s)	Length
1.	"Rukte Rukte Chali Re"	Neeraj Pandey	Sagar Desai	Suraj Jagan	3:37
2.	"Humsafar"	Arun Kumar, Pallavi Bhardwaj Hussain	Faizan Hussain	Vidhya Gopal	2:29
3.	"Bar Bar"	Neeraj Pandey	Sagar Desai	Palak Muchhal	3:12
4.	"Majbooriyan"	Arun Kumar	Faizan Hussain	Rehaa	2:57
Total length:					12:15

== Release ==
Mrs. has been making rounds of various international film festivals. It premiered at the 2023 Tallinn Black Nights Film Festival. The teaser was unveiled in November 2023. The film was selected as the closing film at the 2024 New York Indian Film Festival, where Arati Kadav was nominated for the Best Director category. The film made Asia premiere at the 55th IFFI 2024 on November 22, 2024, as well as in the 14th Indian Film Festival of Melbourne (IFFM), 2024. It was released directly on ZEE5 OTT platform on 7 February 2025.

Malhotra bagged the Best Actress award for her performance in the film at the 2024 New York Indian Film Festival.

== Reception ==
On the review aggregator website Rotten Tomatoes, 86% of 14 critics' reviews are positive, with an average rating of 6.3/10.

Saibal Chatterjee of NDTV rated the film 3/5 stars and observed that "Sanya Malhotra lives the role and director Arati Kadav orchestrates her resources with striking efficiency."

Sukanya Verma of Rediff.com rated 4/5 stars and notes "Mrs. succeeds in riling you up for all the right reasons. And without resorting to high-pitched drama."

Shubhra Gupta of The Indian Express gave 3 stars out of 5 and said that "For those who haven't watched the Malayalam original, this Sanya Malhotra-starrer has enough merit. This is just the kind of film, with a clutch of effective performances and important messaging, which should be made mandatory viewing for couples."

A critic for Bollywood Hungama rated the film 3 stars out of 5 and wrote, "Mrs. is a faithful remake and is laced with yet another memorable performance by Sanya Malhotra."

Nandini Ramnath of Scroll.in said that about the film that "Mrs. communicates the reality behind delicious hand-churned meals and elaborate preparations. It involves a woman bent over a flame or a sink, glorified as the perfect housewife but often no better than an unpaid maid."

Sana Farzeen of India Today gave 3.5 stars and writes in her review that "Mrs. is an unsettling reflection of a reality many women silently endure, making it an important watch. While it may not fully capture the unfiltered rawness of The Great Indian Kitchen, it still delivers a gut-wrenching portrayal of systemic patriarchy. "

Film Critic Sucharita Tyagi praises the film, saying, "Mrs. is too faithful a remake. Barring some (ineffective) song and dance, every beat is nearly identical to the original. Even if one hasn't watched Jeo Baby's film, the Bollywood sheen, texture, and overall voice in Mrs. is so overwhelming and complete in, one can pretty accurately predict where each scene is headed."
