= Ayush Mehra =

Indian actor

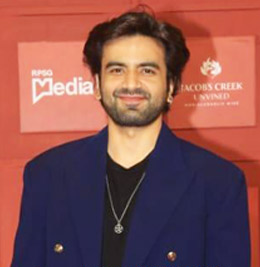
- Mehra in 2025
- Born: 7 November 1992 (age 34); Mumbai, Maharashtra
- Occupations: Actor; host
- Years active: 2010–present
- Partner: Aashna Vijay

Ayush Mehra (born, 7 November 1992), is an Indian actor who primarily works in Hindi films and web shows. He made his debut in the film Isi Life Mein...! (2010) and his television debut in Love By Chance (2014). He made his web debut with Mom and Co and hosted Myntra Fashion Superstar, both in 2019.

Mehra went onto establish himself with successful web shows including Minus One, Please Find Attached and Operation MBBS and the television show Life Lafde Aur Bandiyan.

== Personal life ==
Since 2006, Mehra is in a relationship with Aashna Vijay.

== Career ==
=== Debut and early career (2010-2018) ===
Mehra made his acting debut in 2010 with the Hindi film Isi Life Mein...! portraying Sunil. He then portrayed Raj in the 2012 Hindi film Bittoo Boss.

He made his television debut in 2014 with Love By Chance portraying Dhruv opposite Shivangi Joshi. In 2015, he appeared in the final episode of the show, portraying Onil Chakravarty opposite Priya Chauhan.

In 2015 and 2016, he portrayed Aditya and Aarav in Yeh Hai Aashiqui respectively, both opposite Shrishti Ganguly Rindani. The same year, he portrayed Rishabh Bhalla in his first fiction show Life Lafde Aur Bandiyan.

=== Breakthrough and success (2019-2021) ===
The year 2019 proved as a major turning point in his career. He first worked as an assistant director in Uri: The Surgical Strike. He then made his web debut with Mom and Co portraying Aditya Joshi alongside Neelima Azeem.

Mehra appeared in other web shows the same year including, Love On The Rocks portraying Nikhil and When You Meet Your Ex portraying Karan opposite Shreya Gupto. He also hosted Myntra Fashion Superstar.

Since 2019, Mehra is seen portraying Varun in Minus One opposite Aisha Ahmed and is seen portraying Shaurya Singh in Please Find Attached opposite Barkha Singh.

In 2020, he portrayed Dhruv Singh in the short film Phone Call. From 2020 to 2021, he portrayed Nishant Singh in Operation MBBS alongside Anshul Chauhan and Sarah Hashmi.

In 2021, he appeared in Call My Agent: Bollywood portraying Mehershad. He was also seen in Life Love Siyaapa portraying Rishab opposite Shanice Shrestha.

=== Recent work (2022-present) ===
In 2022, Mehra portrayed Akash in the reel series How To Fall In Love opposite Tanya Maniktala. He then portrayed Pranav in the short film Recommended For You.

Mehra made next his film debut with Kacchey Limbu opposite Radhika Madan. The film premiered at the 47th Toronto International Film Festival.

He also appeared in the second season of Minus One.

== Filmography ==
Key
| † | Denotes films that have not yet been released |

=== Films ===
| Year | Title | Role | Notes | Ref. |
|---|---|---|---|---|
| 2010 | Isi Life Mein...! | Sunil | | |
| 2012 | Bittoo Boss | Raj | | |
| 2019 | Uri: The Surgical Strike | —N/a | Assistant director | |
| 2020 | Phone Call | Dhruv Singh | Short film | |
| 2022 | Recommended For You | Pranav | Short film | |
| 2023 | Kacchey Limbu | Kabir Saini | | |

=== Television ===
| Year | Title | Role | Notes | Ref. |
|---|---|---|---|---|
| 2014 | Love By Chance | Dhruv | Episode: "Boys Not Allowed" | |
| 2015 | Love By Chance | Onil Chakravarty | Episode: "Desi VS Videshi" | |
| 2015 | Yeh Hai Aashiqui | Aditya | Episode: "Best Friends Forever" | |
| 2016 | Yeh Hai Aashiqui | Aarav | Episode: "Heartly Yours" | |
| 2016 | Life Lafde Aur Bandiyan | Rishabh Bhalla | | |

=== Web series ===
| Year | Title | Role | Notes | Ref. |
|---|---|---|---|---|
| 2019 | Mom and Co | Aditya Joshi | | |
| 2019 | Love On The Rocks | Nikhil | Episode: "Doodho Nahao Pooto Phalo" | |
| 2019 | Minus One | Varun | | |
| 2019 | Myntra Fashion Superstar | Host | Season 1 | |
| 2019–2021 | When You Meet Your Ex | Karan | | |
| 2019–2022 | Please Find Attached | Shaurya Singh | 3 seasons | |
| 2020–2021 | Operation MBBS | Nishant Singh | 2 seasons | |
| 2021 | Call My Agent: Bollywood | Mehershad | | |
| 2021 | Life Love Siyaapa | Rishab | | |
| 2022 | How To Fall In Love | Akash | | |
| 2025 | Oops! Ab Kya? | Vishal Mehra | Season 1; Episode 7 | |

== Awards and nominations ==
| Year | Award | Category | Work | Result | Ref. |
|---|---|---|---|---|---|
| 2022 | Indian Television Academy Awards | Popular Actor - OTT | Call My Agent: Bollywood | Nominated | |
| 2022 | Indian Television Academy Awards | Popular Actor - OTT | Please Find Attached 3 | Nominated | |
| 2023 | Filmfare OTT Awards | Best Supporting Actor in a Web Original Film (Male) | Kacchey Limbu | Nominated | |
