= Sarah Hashmi =

Indian film actor

- Born: Delhi, India
- Occupation: Actress
- Years active: 2013–present

Sarah Hashmi is an Indian actress known for her award-winning role in the short film Bebaak (2019) and for her performance as Huma in the Dice Media web series Operation MBBS (2020–present).

== Early life and background ==
Hashmi was born in Delhi. She is the niece of the late Safdar Hashmi, a noted playwright and political theatre activist. She trained in performing arts through workshops at the National School of Drama and participated in college theatre productions.

== Career ==
=== Short films ===
Hashmi gained critical acclaim for her role as Fatin in Bebaak (2019), directed by Shazia Iqbal and produced by Jar Pictures and Anurag Kashyap. The film explores themes of gender, patriarchy, and religious orthodoxy. Her portrayal of a young woman facing discrimination during a scholarship interview was praised for its emotional depth and realism.

For her performance in Bebaak, she won the Filmfare Short Film Award for Best Actress in 2020.

=== Web series ===
In 2020, Hashmi played Huma Sheikh in Dice Media’s medical-drama web series Operation MBBS. She described building the character using elements from her role in Bebaak as well as inspiration from Harry Potter character Hermione Granger.

She reprised her role in Season 2, which addressed the emotional and academic challenges medical students faced during the COVID-19 pandemic.

=== Other appearances ===
Hashmi has also had minor roles in feature films such as Dil Dhadakne Do (2015) and Bombay Talkies (2013).

== Critical reception ==
Hashmi has been praised for portraying strong yet vulnerable female characters. Critics have highlighted her ability to express inner conflict with subtlety. Her performance in Bebaak was described by The Times of India as “inspiring and powerful.”

== Filmography ==
Year	Title	Role	Notes
2013	Bombay Talkies	Unknown	Minor role (uncredited)
2015	Dil Dhadakne Do	Divya	Cameo
2018	Happy Phirr Bhag Jayegi	Luvleen	
2019	Bebaak	Fatin	Short film
2020 - 2021	Operation MBBS	Huma	Web series
2025	Jolly LLB 3	Varsha Solanki	

== Awards ==
- Filmfare Short Film Award for Best Actress – for Bebaak (2020)
