= Meghan Allen =

American model and reality show personality (born 1980)

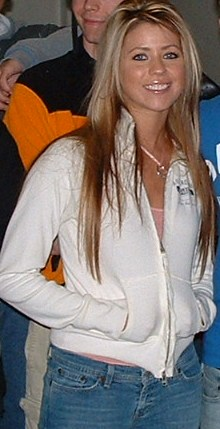
- Meghan in 2005
- Born: November 12, 1980 (age 45); Meadville, Pennsylvania, U.S.
- Occupations: Model, reality show contestant
- Years active: 2004–present
- Known for: Fear Factor contestant, Playboy Cybergirl, Momma's Boys contestant
- Height: 5 ft 4 in (1.63 m)
- Spouse: Devin Harris (m. 2013)
- Children: 2

Meghan Allen (born November 12, 1980, in Meadville, Pennsylvania) is an American softcore model and reality show contestant. She was Playboy Cybergirl of the Month for January 2008. Meghan first appeared on the NBC reality show Fear Factor in 2004. Together with James Wise, her boyfriend at the time, she competed in the Couples edition, doing eight episodes of the show altogether. In 2008, Allen was a participant in the reality show Momma's Boys on NBC. In 2013, Allen married NBA player, Devin Harris. They have 2 children.

== Modeling career ==
=== Women of Fear Factor ===
In February 2005, Meghan posed nude for Playboy, together with six other female contestants from the reality show Fear Factor. Later that year, she was featured in Playboy's DVD Women of Fear Factor.

=== Playboy Cybergirl ===
In September 2007, Allen appeared nude in a Playboy Cyber Club pictorial as a Cybergirl of the Week. She later became Cybergirl of the Month in January 2008, doing five softcore videos and several pictorials.

Originally appearing with natural size 32B breasts in Women of Fear Factor she received augmentation in October 2006 and became a 34C. The reason for this choice was that she wanted her "clothing to fit better".

== Other public appearances ==
=== The Howard Stern Show ===
On January 15, 2009, she appeared on The Howard Stern Show to play "Dumb as a Rock", where she revealed that she was dating NBA All-Star Devin Harris. They married in 2013 and have two children together.

=== Corrie and Meaghan's Party for a Purpose '09 ===
In 2009, she hosted a fundraiser for ovarian cancer alongside reality show star Corrie Loftin.

She also took part in the Bay Beatdown EFC (Extreme Fight Club) Fight as a guest ring girl where she passed out t-shirts and other goodies for fans with the two ring girls, and the two aspiring ring girls Lulu Kramer and Dianna.

In 2008, Allen was a participant in the reality show Momma's Boys on NBC.
