= 3 Storeys =

2018 Indian film by Arjun Mukerjee

- Theatrical release poster
- Directed by: Arjun Mukherjee
- Written by: Althea Delmas Kaushal
- Produced by: Ritesh Sidhwani; Farhan Akhtar; Priya Sreedharan
- Starring: Renuka Shahane; Sharman Joshi; Pulkit Samrat; Masumeh; Richa Chadda; Sonal Jha; Aisha Ahmed; Ankit Rathi
- Cinematography: William Humphris
- Edited by: Arindam Ghatak
- Music by: Clinton Cerejo
- Production companies: Excel Entertainment; B4U Motion Pictures; Open Air Films
- Distributed by: AA Films
- Release date: 9 March 2018
- Running time: 100 minutes
- Country: India
- Language: Hindi

3 Storeys is a 2018 Hindi-language thriller drama film directed by Arjun Mukherjee starring Renuka Shahane, Sharman Joshi, Pulkit Samrat, Masumeh, Richa Chadda, Sonal Jha, Aisha Ahmed, Ankit Rathi and produced by Priya Sreedharan, Ritesh Sidhwani and Farhan Akhtar. The film was released on 9 March 2018.

== Plot ==
Mayanagar is a three-story chawl in Mumbai. Flory Mendonca, a Catholic widow, wants to sell part of her house but struggles to find buyers due to its high price. Eventually, Vilas, eager for a home near the station, buys it. In the same building, Varsha endures daily abuse from her unemployed, alcoholic husband while still harboring feelings for her past lover, Shankar. She bonds well with a neighbor and takes care of her young son. Suhail and Malini, from different faiths, fall in love, much to their parents' dismay. On the ground floor lives glamorous Leela, who exudes a seductive aura towards the men around. The lives of Mayanagar’s residents are filled with hidden secrets, revealed at the end when it's disclosed that Leela authored all three stories.

In the first part, Flory attends to a prospective buyer, Vilas, frustrated by his search for accommodation in Mumbai. Vilas doesn’t hesitate at the high price. As she goes to make tea, Vilas examines family photos and learns about her son’s troubled past and his fatal involvement in a robbery. As Vilas listens, he becomes anxious and starts gulping his tea, sweating. Flory reveals she never met the accomplice who escaped and informed the police about her son's location, but she knew he would come for the hidden diamonds. Vilas is the accomplice, and Flory has poisoned his tea. Vilas dies, and Flory buries him in her house, avenging her son. Now, she can leave her wretched home.

The story then shifts to Varsha, a woman tortured by her husband. Before marriage, Varsha loved Shankar and asked him to propose. Her father warned her that if Shankar didn’t come, he would marry her off. Shankar didn't show up. Varsha forms a close bond with a sympathetic neighbor, only to discover her husband is Shankar. They clear up a misunderstanding about their past, and Flory leaves her plot to Varsha, who begins a new, independent life.

Next, we follow Suhail, from a Muslim family, and Malini, the daughter of a pitiful mother. They elope but are soon caught. Malini’s mother seeks help from Suhail’s family, revealing Suhail and Malini share the same father. This revelation devastates them.

The narrative, filled with suspense and surprise, reveals Leela, the author of these stories, as a simple woman in a wheelchair, reading a newspaper about her anonymously published story. The headlines praise the captivating tale of Mayanagar's residents. Leela shows how she crafted a fictional narrative from the dark realities of human intimacy and love.

== Cast ==
- Renuka Shahane as Flory Mendonca
- Sharman Joshi as Shankar Varma
- Pulkit Samrat as Vilas Naik
- Masumeh as Varsha Atre (Joshi)
- Richa Chadda as Leela
- Sonal Jha as Malini's mother
- Aisha Ahmed as Malini Mathur
- Ankit Rathi as Suhail Ansari
- Laksh Singh as Dominic
- Himanshu Malik as Policeman Ganpatrao

== Soundtrack ==
3 Storeys

Soundtrack album by Clinton Cerejo and Amjad Nadeem
- Released: 27 February 2018
- Genre: Feature film soundtrack
- Length: 16:56
- Language: Hindi
- Label: Zee Music Company
External audio
- Audio Jukebox on YouTube

Singles from 3 Storeys
- 1. "Bas Tu Hai" Released: 14 February 2018; 2. "Raasleela" Released: 21 February 2018; 3. "Azaadiyaan" Released: 27 February 2018; 4. "Zaroori Bewakoofi" Released: 27 February 2018

The music of the film has been composed by Clinton Cerejo and Amjad Nadeem while lyrics are penned by Puneet Krishna, Alaukik Rahi, Amjad Nadeem, Shellee and Pushaan Mukherjee. The first song of the film Bas Tu Hai which is sung by Arijit Singh and Jonita Gandhi was released on 14 February 2018 on the occasion of Valentine's Day. The second track of the film titled as Raasleela which is sung by Sumedha Karmahe was released on 21 February 2018. The third song to be released was Azaadiyaan which is sung by Clinton Cerejo and Bianca Gomes was released on 27 February 2018. The soundtrack album of the film consists of 4 songs and was officially released by Zee Music Company on 27 February 2018.

Track listing
No.	Title	Lyrics	Singer(s)	Length
1.	"Bas Tu Hai"	Puneet Krishna	Arijit Singh, Jonita Gandhi	4:23
2.	"Raasleela" (Music by: Amjad Nadeem)	Alaukik Rahi, Amjad Nadeem	Sumedha Karmahe	4:07
3.	"Azaadiyaan"	Shellee	Clinton Cerejo, Bianca Gomes	4:22
4.	"Zaroori Bewakoofi"	Pushaan Mukherjee	Mohit Chauhan	4:04
Total length:				16:56

== Critical reception ==
Lasyapriya Sundaram of The Times of India gave the film a rating of 3.5 out of 5 saying that, "3 Storeys cleverly demonstrates the art of skillfully telling a story wherein all the loose ends of a plot are tied together into a neat whole." Saibal Chatterjee of NDTV praised the performances of the actors specially Renuka Shahane but found the conclusion of the story to be weak. The critic gave the film a rating of 2.5 out of 5 and said that, "For all its flaws, 3 Storeys is still worth watching because it seeks to engage with the audience in a manner that is anything but run of the mill." Rajeev Masand of News18 gave the film a rating of 2.5 out of 5 saying that "it's a half-baked experiment with a few shining moments." Sweta Kausal of Hindustan Times gave the film a rating of 2.5 out of 5 saying that, "It is a film that weaves together thriller, love story, social issues, realities and life all in one package, without being too messy. The actors' brilliant performances are added bonus."

Shubhra Gupta of The Indian Express gave the film a rating of 2.5 out of 5 saying that the movie "comes off nice in bits but uneven overall. Everyone plays it quite competently, despite the predictable beats." Rohit Bhatnagar of Deccan Chronicle was impressed with the performances of all actors and felt Renuka Shahane's act was "flawless." The critic gave the film a rating of 3 out of 5 and said that, "With predictable moments scattered all over the film, debutant director Arjun Mukherjee still takes a brave attempt of making an unconventional thriller." Udita Jhunjhunwala of Live Mint reviewed the film saying that, "Arjun Mukherjee's film has some convincing performances but is tonally inconsistent." Suparno Sarkar of IBTimes gave the film a rating of 3 out of 5 saying that, "3 Storeys is an unconventional drama that could have been much better."
