= Happy Patel: Khatarnak Jasoos =

2026 Indian film by Vir Das & Kavi Shastri

- Theatrical release poster
- Directed by: Vir Das; Kavi Shastri
- Written by: Vir Das; Amogh Randive
- Produced by: Aamir Khan; Aparna Purohit; Vir Das; Kavi Shastri
- Starring: Vir Das; Mithila Palkar; Mona Singh; Sharib Hashmi; Shrushti Tawade
- Cinematography: Himman Dhamija
- Edited by: Daanish Shastri
- Music by: Songs: See soundtrack Score: Shalom Benjamin; Nirmit Shah; Parth Pandya
- Production company: Aamir Khan Productions
- Distributed by: PVR Inox Pictures (India); AA Films (International)
- Release date: 16 January 2026
- Running time: 121 minutes
- Country: India
- Language: Hindi
- Box office: ₹6.84 crore

Happy Patel: Khatarnak Jasoos (transl. Happy Patel: Dangerous Spy) is a 2026 Indian Hindi-language spy action comedy film directed by Vir Das and Kavi Shastri, written by Das and Amogh Ranadive, and produced by Aamir Khan, Aparna Purohit, Das and Shastri under Aamir Khan Productions, with Zazu Productions as a shadow banner. The film stars Das as the titular secret agent, with Mithila Palkar, Mona Singh, Sharib Hashmi and Srushti Tawade in pivotal roles. Featuring Aamir and Imran Khan in cameos, it also marks Imran's comeback roughly ten years after he last starred in Katti Batti (2015).

== Plot ==
Happy Patel, the adopted son of two gay British secret agents, who aspired to follow his fathers' footsteps, and join the MI7 covert agency, but failed, soon learns that he is of Indian origin. He is assigned to Goa, on a mission, to rescue and retrieve a white woman who is being forced to work in a factory on developing a formula for a fairness cream by local Don Mama, who houses an inter-generational enmity with Happy, and is eager to settle scores.

== Cast ==
- Vir Das as Happy Patel
  - Krishiv Bhandari as young Happy
- Mithila Palkar as Rupa
- Mona Singh as Mama
- Sharib Hashmi as Geet
- Srushti Tawade as Roxy
- Simon Feilder as Sebastian Paisley
- Benedict Garrett as Kenneth Mole
- Jemima Dunn as Mary Wilkins
- Hella Stichlmair as Aunty
- Aamir Khan as Jimmy Mario (cameo appearance)
- Imran Khan as Milind Morea (cameo appearance)
- Sanjeev Kapoor as himself (cameo appearance)
- Meiyang Chang as himself (cameo appearance)
- Ash King as himself (special appearance in song "Banda Tere Liye")
- Sumukhi Suresh as Sakhubai Patel (cameo appearance)
- Ashwin Mushran as Instructor
- Mayank Parakh as Peter
- Vishwanath Kulkarni as Shailesh

== Soundtrack ==
Happy Patel: Khatarnak Jasoos

Soundtrack album by Vir Das, Parth Parekh, Ajay Jayanthi, Akshay, IP Singh, Shalom Benjamin, Manan Mehta, Achint Thakkar, Nirmit Shah, Kaizad Gherda, Sidd Coutto, Shalom Benjamin and Alien Chutney
- Released: 13 January 2026
- Recorded: 2025
- Genre: Feature film soundtrack
- Length: 28:24
- Language: Hindi
- Label: Zee Music Company
External audio
- Official Audio Jukebox on YouTube

The soundtrack is composed by Vir Das, Parth Parekh, Ajay Jayanthi, Akshay, IP Singh, Shalom Benjamin, Manan Mehta, Achint Thakkar, Nirmit Shah, Kaizad Gherda, Sidd Coutto, Shalom Benjamin and Alien Chutney with lyrics written by Das, Mxrzi, Neeraj Pandey, Singh, Mehta, Suchita Shirke and Benjamin.

Track listing
No.	Title	Lyrics	Music	Singer(s)	Length
1.	"Banda Tere Liye"	Vir Das, Mxrzi & Neeraj Pandey	Parth Parekh, Ajay Jayanthi	Ash King, Ajay Jayanthi, Mxrzi	2:46
2.	"Phukt Apan"	Vir Das, Mxrzi	Vir Das, Parth Parekh	Mxrzi	2:30
3.	"Chaanta Tera"	IP Singh	Akshay, IP Singh	IP Singh, Nupoor Khedkar	2:57
4.	"Alpha Male"	Vir Das	Vir Das, Shalom Benjamin	Shalom Benjamin	1:10
5.	"Dushman"	Vir Das	Vir Das, Manan Mehta	Ajay Jayanthi	2:05
6.	"Kill Kill Dil"	Vir Das, Manan Mehta	Vir Das, Manan Mehta	Manan Mehta	1:23
7.	"Cous Cous"	Vir Das	Vir Das, Parth Parekh	Vir Das	0:38
8.	"Legend of Jimmy Mario"	Vir Das	Achint Thakkar, Vir Das	Siddharth Basrur, Achint Thakkar	2:31
9.	"Goa Aaja"	Vir Das	Vir Das & Parth Parekh	Vir Das	1:09
10.	"Dhuaan"	Vir Das	Vir Das, Nirmit Shah	Shreya Bhattacharya	1:16
11.	"Hindustani Hoon"	Vir Das	Kaizad Gherda, Vir Das	Vir Das	2:46
12.	"Rest in Peace Mario"	Vir Das	Sidd Coutto, Vir Das	Samantha Edwards	2:12
13.	"Ikde Naach"	Vir Das, Suchita Shirke	Parth Parekh, Vir Das	Devashri Manohar	0:33
14.	"Yummy Yummy"	Shalom Benjamin	Shalom Benjamin	Shalom Benjamin	0:48
15.	"Sajna Dilruba"	Vir Das	Nimrit Shah, Vir Das, Alien Chutney, Akshay, IP Singh	Nimrit Shah, Vir Das, Alien Chutney, Akshay, IP Singh	3:40
Total length:					28:24

== Release ==
=== Theatrical ===
Happy Patel: Khatarnak Jasoos was theatrically released on 16 January 2026.

=== Home media ===
The film is available to stream on Netflix from 1 April 2026.

== Reception ==
The film received mixed reviews from critics. On the review aggregator website Rotten Tomatoes, 45% of 11 critics' reviews are positive, with an average rating of 5/10.

Deepa Gahlot of Rediff.com gave 2.5/5 stars and wrote "Happy Patel is not supposed to make sense, and doesn't even pretend to. But most of the time, it is trying too hard -- which ruins any comedy -- and the jokes fall flat. Still, the silliness is layered with such good cheer that it does get some laughs".

Shubhra Gupta of The Indian Express gave 2/5 stars and said that "the film has too many ideas and jokes, tries to talk about everything at once, and as a result the comedy and emotions don’t land properly. A few performances and cameos are fun, but overall the movie feels messy and unfocused". Rahul Desai of The Hollywood Reporter India observed that "The Vir Das-starring comedy about a bumbling NRI spy in Goa is unapologetically crazy, clumsy and contagious and It is a Sparkling Comedy With No Inhibitions".

Rishabh Suri of Hindustan Times rated 2.5/5 stars and wrote "Happy Patel must have sounded terrific on paper, largely because the film never intends to take itself seriously. Every character is given a quirk. The trouble is, it plays out like that friend in the group who is blissfully unaware of how half their jokes are unfunny. But one doesn't have the heart to tell them."

Sana Farzeen of India Today gave 3.5/5 stars and says that "the film successfully breaks the macho spy stereotype, is loud, absurd and self-aware, delivers genuine laughs, and works well if you don’t expect depth—just fun".

Radhika Sharma of NDTV gave 3/5 stars and states that "the film is silly, self-aware and chaotic fun—it doesn’t always make sense, but it delivers laughs, breaks the macho spy image, and is worth watching if you enjoy absurd humour".

Nandini Ramnath of Scroll.in stated that "So silly that it’s juvenile and sometimes so anarchic that it almost escapes notice, the 121-minute Happy Patel takes refuge behind its conceit. This is a film about nothing pretending to be about something."
