= Momma's Boys =

- Created by: Ryan Seacrest
- Opening theme: "Hot n Cold" by Katy Perry
- Country of origin: United States
- No. of seasons: 1
- No. of episodes: 6

Production
- Executive producers: Ryan Seacrest; Andrew Glassman
- Running time: 60 minutes
- Production companies: Ryan Seacrest Productions; Glassman Media

Original release
- Network: NBC
- Release: December 16, 2008 – January 19, 2009

Momma's Boys is an American reality television series that aired on the NBC network, executive produced by Ryan Seacrest and Andrew Glassman, which centers on a group of mothers who must help choose the perfect woman for their sons. Ultimately, the series poses the question: "Who really is the most important woman in a man's life?" The show ran a single season of six episodes, from December 2008 to January 2009.

At the beginning of the series, 32 single women are contestants seeking romance with any of three single men (firefighter/paramedic Michael Sarysz, real estate broker Robert Kluge, or college student Jojo Bojanowski). The men's mothers are brought in to live in a house with the female contestants while the sons are housed in a nearby condominium.

Throughout the series, the female contestants participate in competitions and are selected by the men for dates, with some of the contestants being eliminated at various intervals. Each woman receives a text message of "yes" if any of the men want to keep her in contention or "no" if none of them want to keep her in contention. If the men are undecided, they send a text message for the woman to meet them at the house's swimming pool, where the men have an additional opportunity to talk to her before deciding whether she should stay or go.

The men make the decisions whether each woman should stay or go, but the mothers actively seek to influence their sons as to those decisions.

Some of the female contestants were nude models for Playboy or Penthouse, namely Erica Ellyson, Meghan Allen, Brittany Fuchs, and Stacy Fuson. Megan Albertus is an actress who appeared in film prior to her time on the show. Camilla Poindexter later appeared on Bad Girls Club season 8.

In December 2008, Luftu Murat Uckardesler sought an injunction to prevent the airing of the show for 45 days. Uckardesler has a reality show The Perfect Bride that is a hit in Turkey, Italy and the Middle East. Uckardesler claims a trademark on Perfect Bride and a copyright to a "reality television format centering on mothers and sons and their attempts to find the 'Perfect Bride.'" NBC used the phrase "Perfect Bride" in its advertising for Momma's Boy. The court did not issue the injunction.

On March 13, 2009, it was confirmed that the series had been canceled and would not be returning for a second season.

== Elimination chart ==
Michael, Rob and JoJo's callout order
Order	Starting Group of Ladies	Episodes						
Order	Starting Group of Ladies	1	2		3	4	5	6
1	Amanda	Amanda	Nikki	Camilla	Mindy^{4}	Lauren	Camilla^{6}	Lauren^{6}
2	Amy	Amy	Liz	Stacy	Amanda	Camilla	Lauren	Amanda
3	Brittany	Brittany	Carina	Cara	Lauren^{6}	Nikki	Amanda^{5}	Mindy
4	Callie	Callie	Michelle	Brittany^{4}	Erica	Erica^{5}	Erica	Erica^{5}
5	Camilla	Camilla	Maisha	Julie	Julie	Amanda	Mindy^{4}	Camilla
6	Cara	Cara	Meghan	Meghan	Meghan	Meghan^{5}	Julie	
7	Carina	Carina	Amanda	Jessica C.	Camilla	Julie	Nikki	
8	Donna	Donna	Camilla	Misty	Maisha	Mindy	Meghan^{5}	
9	Erica	Erica	Callie	Mindy	Liz	Maisha		
10	Jamie	Jamie	Stacy	Liz	Misty	Liz		
11	Jessica B.	Jessica B.	Misty	Erica	Nikki ^{3}	Misty^{4}		
12	Jessica C.	Jessica C.	Lauren	Maisha	Michelle ^{3}	Michelle		
13	Julie	Julie	Mindy	Nikki	Brittany^{3}			
14	Lauren	Lauren	Myaa	Amanda^{6}	Cara			
15	Liz	Liz	Erica	Michelle^{5}	Jessica C.^{5}			
16	Lynette	Lynette	Jessica C.	Lauren ^{3}	Carina^{5}			
17	Madeline	Madeline	Julie	Carina^{3}	Stacy			
18	Maisha	Maisha	Brittany	Megan^{3}				
19	Megan	Megan	Payten	Vita				
20	Meghan	Meghan	Megan^{3}	Callie				
21	Michelle	Michelle	Cara ^{3}	Myaa				
22	Mindy	Mindy	Vita ^{3}	Payten				
23	Misty	Misty	Lynette^{3}					
24	Myaa	Myaa	Madeline^{3}					
25	Natalie	Natalie	Jessica B.					
26	Nikki	Mikki	Amy					
27	Payten	Payten	Simone					
28	Rana Lyn	Rana Lyn	Rochelle					
29	Rochelle	Rochelle	Jamie					
30	Simone	Simone	Donna					
31	Stacy	Stacy	Natalie					
32	Vita	Vita	Rana Lyn					

^{1} Contestants are listed alphabetically by first name because no contestants were eliminated in this episode.
^{2} In this episode, contestants received a "yes," "no," or "maybe" text message. "Yes" and "no" indicated that the woman was saved or eliminated, respectively. Women receiving a "maybe" text were saved or eliminated in a face-to-face poolside ceremony.
^{3} The contestant received a "maybe" text.
^{4} The contestant went on a date with Jojo
^{5} The contestant went on a date with Michael
^{6} The contestant went on a date with Rob
The contestant won Momma's Boys by Michael's choice
The contestant won Momma's Boys by Rob's choice.
The contestant won Momma's Boys by JoJo's choice.
The contestant won the suitability challenge and was immune from elimination.
The contestant was going to be eliminated, but due to another contestant quitting, they were allowed to stay.
The contestant was eliminated.
The contestant quit the competition.

- Contestants are arranged in the order they were called to stay in the game.
- Contestants are arranged alphabetically in Episode 1 because there were no eliminations.

== Episode summaries ==
=== Episode 1 ===
There were no contestants eliminated in Episode 1.

=== Episode 2 ===
Episode 2 was two hours long and included two separate rounds of eliminations. In the first elimination round, Jessica B., Amy, Simone, Rochelle, Jamie, Donna, Natalie, and Rana Lyn were eliminated by text message. Lynette and Madeline were eliminated after being called down to the pool. Megan, Cara, and Vita were called down to the pool but kept in the competition.

Camilla, Stacy, Cara, and Brittany won a suitability challenge and were immune from elimination in the second elimination round. In the second elimination round, Vita, Callie, Mya, and Payten were eliminated by text message. Lauren, Carina, and Megan were called down to the pool, at which time Lauren was kept in the competition and Megan quit. Carina would have been eliminated but was kept in due to Megan's departure.

=== Episode 3 ===
When the episode began, a box was brought in. It contained files about each woman's personal details. In this episode's challenge Food Network chef Tyler Florence divided the women into groups to Michael, Rob, or Jojo their favorite food. Jojo's mom cried since no one chose to prepare her son's favorite food (catlase and grape leaves). The chef asked Julie to make his food, and she did. Some of the women elected to prepare their own personal favorite recipes, as Meghan and Amanda cooked a stuffed pepper dish instead; Erica made a chicken casserole. After the women prepared the meals, the sons and chef judged each of the meals. The winners were Amanda, Meghan, Julie, and Erica, who were exempted from having their files opened in this episode.

After this round, the mothers opened the files. Lorraine chose Michelle. Esther chose Lauren in order to see how good she was. Khalood chose Brittany.

Although they went on dates with Michael in that episode, Carina and Jessica C. were both eliminated. Stacey and Cara both received a no via text message, and Cara threw a tantrum upon her exit. The next elimination was to decide the fates of Nikki, Michelle, and Brittany, and Brittany was eliminated at the pool.

=== Episode 4 ===
The episode began with a specific focus on family holiday traditions. With the assistance of a priest and a rabbi, the women were given 2 hours to prepare either a Christmas morning or a Hanukkah party along the men and their mothers. Following the festivities, Erica and Michael had their first date, followed by Jojo and Misty. During her son's date, Khalood demanded to the producers that she be taken to her son's location. When she was taken by helicopter to his date, she was distraught when she caught the pair embracing.

The next round of the series would continue in the U.S. Virgin Islands. The men would be allowed to select two women to accompany them, and their mothers would choose one. Rob first chose Camilla and then Amanda, however, Amanda declined the invitation from Rob. Rob then picked Nikki to go with him. Esther picked Lauren to attend as well. Michael selected Erica and Meghan to go with him, and specifically rejected Michelle. Lorraine chose Amanda as her pick. Jojo refused Misty citing that she did not respect his mother, and he chose both Julie and Mindy to come with him. However, his mother, feeling that none of the women were an appropriate match for him, tore up the remaining ticket. The two remaining girls, Liz and Maisha, were therefore also eliminated.

=== Episode 5 ===
In the U.S. Virgin Islands, the men had individual dates with one of the women chosen to go. Rob and Camilla, Michael and Amanda, and Jojo and Mindy had a date.

For the eliminations, the mothers were allowed to select the women they felt was most compatible with their son. In return, that woman would be both spared from elimination and allowed to accompany the man on the final date. Esther again chose Lauren, Lorraine selected Erica, and Khalood denied both Mindy and Julie the final date. Finally, the men were forced to eliminate one girl. Nikki, Meghan, and Julie were asked to leave.

=== Episode 6 ===
In the season finale (which also became the series finale), the men went on a final date. Having selected neither Julie or Mindy to attend the final date, Khalood accompanied her son instead. Rob and Lauren shared another date, and during her date with Michael, Erica revealed to both him and Lorraine her status as the 2008 Penthouse Pet of the Year. The men would then have to make a final decision, and the winning pair would receive an extended vacation. For the final selection, Rob chose Lauren over Camilla. Michael picked Amanda, and Jojo picked Mindy over his mother. In the epilogue, Rob left after one day, and without Lauren. Khalood refused counseling, and that following the expiration of her contract, Erica visited Lorraine in Florida.

== International versions ==
Country	Name	Host	Network	Date premiered
Hungary	ÖsszeEsküvők; Esküdj!	Attila Till and Mariann Peller; Majka	TV2, FEM3, PRO4	September 2011
India	Perfect Bride	Megha Gupta and Vishal Malhotra	STAR Plus	September 12, 2009
Italy	La sposa perfetta	Cesare Cadeo and Roberta Lanfranchi	Rai 2	2007
Sweden	Mammas pojkar	Angelica Wallgren	TV4	October 8, 2009
Turkey	Gelinim Olur musun	Ebru Akel	Show TV	2004
