= Coat (film) =

- Release poster
- Directed by: Akshay Ditti
- Written by: Kumar Abhishek; Akshay Ditti
- Produced by: Kumar Abhishek; Arpit Garg; Pinnu Singh
- Starring: Sanjay Mishra; Vivaan Shah; Sonal Jha; Pooja Pandey
- Cinematography: Yogesh M. Koli
- Edited by: Sanjay Sankla
- Music by: Vardan Singh; Hriju Roy
- Production companies: Arpit Garg and Brandex Entertainment perfect Time Pictures; Black Panthers Movies LTD.
- Release date: 26 May 2023
- Running time: 123 minutes
- Country: India
- Language: Hindi

Coat is a 2023 Indian Hindi-language drama film directed by Akshay Ditti. Produced by Pinnu Singh, Arpit Garg, Kumar Abhishek and Shiv Aryan, the film stars Sanjay Mishra, Vivaan Shah, Pooja Pandey and Sonal Jha. The film was released theatrically on 26 May 2023.

== Plot ==
Madho and his father are pig farmers, of a low caste, and are not respected by the other villagers. One day he sees a foreigner being respected and because of his expensive coat. Determined Madho tries to acquire a coat that he cannot afford.

== Cast ==
- Sanjay Mishra as Mohan
- Vivaan Shah as Madho
- Sonal Jha as Sahamuni
- Pooja Pandey as Sakshi
- Hare Krishn as Umesh
- Badal Rajpoot as Naval
- Harshita Pandey as Saraswati
- Abhishek Chauhan as Kannu
- Aarohi Nanda
- Deepak Singh Yadav
- Navin Prakash as Akshay
- Gagan Gupta

== Production ==
=== Filming ===
Principal photography of the film commenced on 18 November 2018 and On 24 April 2019, entire shooting of the film has been wrapped up

== Reception ==
=== Critical response ===
Archika Khurana of The Times of India wrote "This 123-minute film manages to capture the essence of hope, perseverance, and self-discovery, depicting the struggles and aspirations of a young boy determined to overcome societal limitations and earn the respect he rightfully deserves". Sakshi Pandey of Amar Ujala says "If such films are promoted and released properly, then definitely the audience can come to watch the film in cinema houses". A critic from Nava Bharat wrote "Akshay Ditti's direction is amazing. He has effectively presented every scene. Coat is a cinema to watch, a cinema to learn from".
