= Sonal Jha =

Indian film and television actress (born 1971)

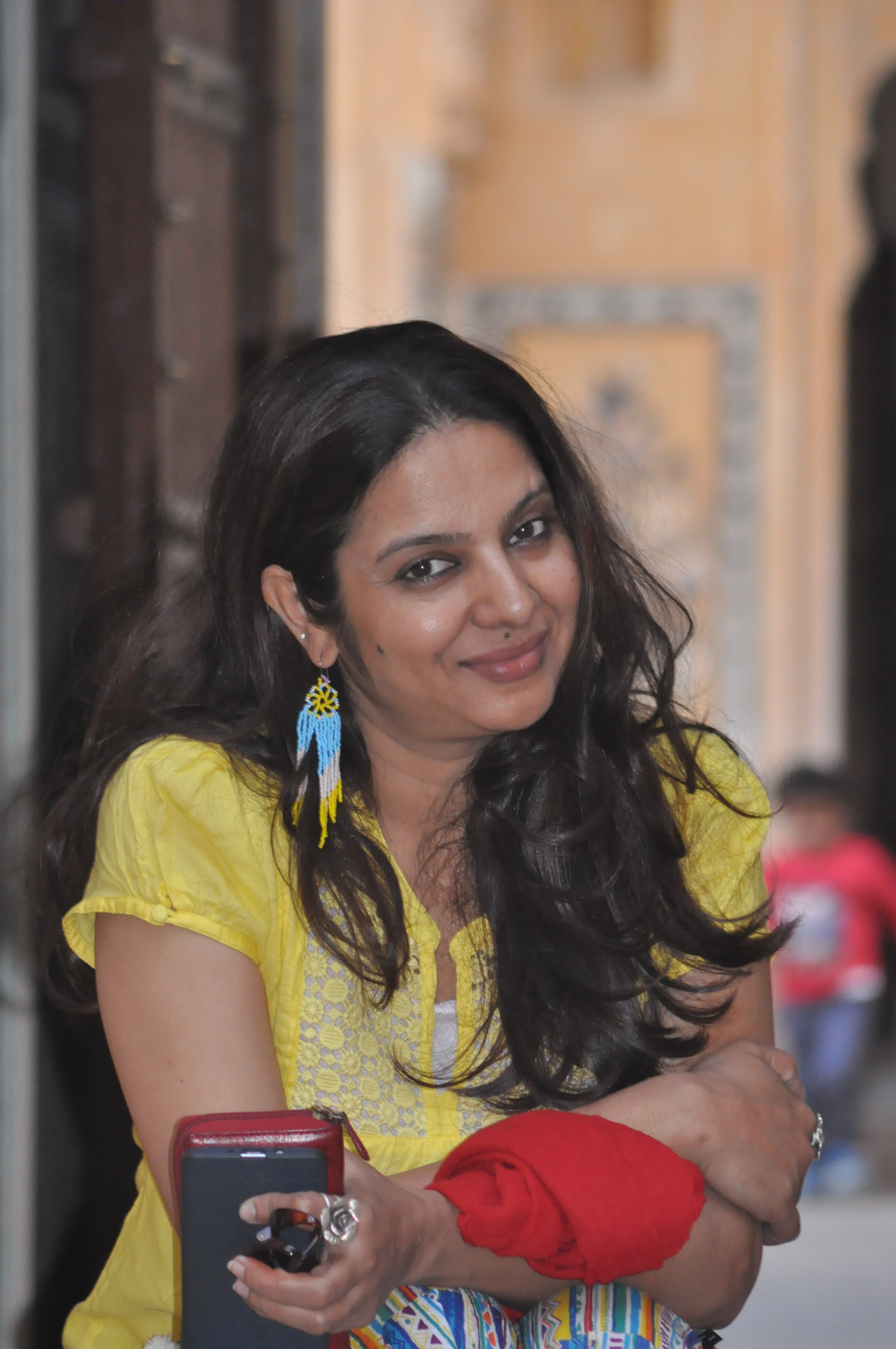
- Jha in 2016
- Born: 29 July 1971 (age 55); Patna, Bihar, India
- Education: Delhi University (MA) Ithaca College (MS)
- Occupation: Actress
- Years active: 2006–present

Sonal Jha (born 29 July 1971) is an Indian film and television actress. Sonal Jha is best known for her roles in films such as Lipstick Under My Burkha, 3 Storeys, Chillar Party and TV Serials such as Na Aana Is Des Laado and Balika Vadhu.

== Personal life ==
Sonal Jha was born in Bihar, Patna and has been involved in theatre since her childhood. In Patna, she performed as an actress and singer for 15 years. Jha later moved to Delhi to pursue her postgraduate education, receiving her master's degree in history from Delhi University.

== Acting career ==
Jha became a member of Ekjute Theater Group, learning from personalities such as Nadira Babbar and acting in several plays throughout India. Eventually, [Prakash jha] hired Jha for his regional (Bhojpuri), in which she played the mother of Bahubali. She rose to fame as Indian soap opera's sensitive and charming mother while playing Irawati in Balika Vadhu. That made her a household name after playing equally important roles in Sapno Ke Bhanwer Main and Na Aana Is Des Laado. Her short film MAD was a Perfect 10 winner at The Mumbai Film Festival.

== Filmography ==
Year	Title	Role	Note
2006	Return to Rajapur	-	English film
2006	Kya Tum Ho	-	
2011	Aarakshan	Shanti Bua	
2011	Chillar Party	Encyclopedia's Mother	
2016	Ishq Forever	Mother	
2017	Lipstick Under My Burkha	Leela's Mother	
2017	MAD	Mother	Short film
2017	Aao Khele Gulli Danda	-	
2018	3 Storeys	Malini's mother	
2019	Malaal	Rajni Tripathi	
2023	Coat	Sahamuni	
2023	Agra	Aunty ji	
2026	Nayyi Navelli	Sumitra Tai	
2026	Ramayana: Part 1	Sumitra	

== Television ==
Year	Title	Channel	Production	Role	Language
2007	Bombay Lawyers	NDTV India	Mr Satyajeet Bhatkal	Lawyer	Hindi
2008	Bahubali	Mahua	Prakash Jha	Mother of Bahubali	Bhojpuri
2008	Hum Ladkiyan	Sony	Emotion Pictures	Subhadra; Alka's mother	Hindi
2009	Na Aana Is Des Laado	Colors	Shakuntalam Telefilms	Sheela Chachi	Hindi
2011	Sapno Ke Bhanwer Main	Life OK	B.A.G. Films & Media	Mother	Hindi
2008-2013	Balika Vadhu	Colors	Viacom 18, Nova television	Irawati, MIL of Anandi	Hindi
2012	Upanishad Ganga	DD National	Chandraprakash Dwivedi	-	Hindi
2016	Ek Rishta Saajhedari Ka	Sony	Rajshri Productions	Chandra Bua	Hindi

== Web series ==
Year	Title	Role	Language	Platform	Ref
2017	The Test Case	Captain Shikha's Mother			
2021	Sunflower	Mrs. Iyer	Hindi	ZEE5	
2023	Jehanabad	Kasturi's Mother	Hindi	Sony Liv	
2024	Dil Dosti Dilemma	Afroz	Hindi	prime video	
2024	Murder In Mahim	Shaheen	Hindi	JioCinema	
2025	Bhay: The Gaurav Tiwari Mystery	Gaurav's Mother	Hindi	Amazon MX Player	
2026	The Pyramid Scheme	Kanchan Chauhan	Hindi	Prime Video	

== Theatre ==
Year	Show	Director	Production	Role	Language
1982-1992	IPTA	-	Patna	-	Hindi
2010	Bali Aur Shambhu	Manav Kaul	-	-	Hindi
2011	Teen Ekant	Sheikh Shami	-	-	Hindi
2014	Pagla Ghoda	Vijay Kumar	-	-	Hindi
2014	Sakharam Binder	Vijay Kumar	-	Champa	Hindi
2015	Tumhara Vincent	Satyabrata Raut	-	Christine	Hindi
2016	CanServive	Vandana Vasist	-	Kamal	Hindi
2016	Mughal-e-Azam (musical)	Feroz Abbas Khan	Shapoorji Pallonji Group	Maharani Jodha	Hindi
