= Minus One (TV series) =

Indian streaming television series

- Genre: Romantic comedy
- Created by: Shubham Yogi; Sidhantha Mathur
- Starring: Ayush Mehra; Aisha Ahmed
- Country of origin: India
- No. of seasons: 2
- No. of episodes: 12

Original release
- Release: 2019

Minus One is an Indian streaming television series created for Lionsgate Play, by Shubham Yogi and Sidhantha Mathur. It is produced by Writeous Studios and stars Ayush Mehra and Aisha Ahmed.

The first season of Minus One was released on YouTube in 2019. The second season, titled New Chapter, premiered on Lionsgate Play on 14 February 2023, which received positive-to-mixed reviews from the critics. Mehra and Ahmed's on-screen chemistry was praised.

== Cast ==
- Ayush Mehra as Varun
- Aisha Ahmed as Ria
- Kira Narayan
- Kusha Kapila as Nayantara

== Production ==
Yogi got the idea of creating this series from his own past relationship where he continued living with his ex-girlfriend as a roommate even after their breakup.

Mehra and Ahmed attended a 15-day intimacy workshop and a 15-day acting workshop for their respective roles.

== Reception ==
Zinia Bandhyopadhyay of India Today rated the second season three out of five, noting Shubham Yogi's evolution as a creator, "deftly mov[ing] from a fun series to something that is more nuanced and delves deeper into human emotions". Shaheen Irani of OTT Play also rated the second season three out of five, praising the performances of Mehra and Ahmed, particularly the latter: "She is brilliant in her role this time around. Her graph is the best you can see in the series." Irani, however, found the series to be "a long journey into nothingness".
