= Lionsgate+ =

International Streaming service by Lionsgate

- Company type: Subsidiary
- Website type: OTT platform
- Available in: Arabic, Urdu, English, Indonesian, Korean, Mandarin, Malayalam, Tamil, Telugu, Kannada, Hindi, Marathi, Bengali, Bhojpuri
- Headquarters: United States, {{{location_country}}}
- Area served: Australia, Belgium, United States, Brazil, Canada, Chile, Colombia, Finland, France, Germany, Italy, Mexico, Netherlands, Poland, Spain, Sweden, United Kingdom, Indonesia, India, Pakistan, New Zealand, Philippines, Saudi Arabia, South Africa, Bangladesh, Yemen, Djibouti, Abu Dhabi, Kuwait, Nepal, Bhutan, Maldives, Sri Lanka, Malaysia
- Owner: Starz Entertainment
- Products: Video streaming
- Website: www.lionsgateplus.com starzplay.com lionsgateplay.com
- Commercial: Yes
- Users: 2.5 Million for Starzplay (As of 2026); 14.8 Million for Lionsgate+ (As of 2026); 37 Million for Lionsgate Play (As of 2023)
- Launched: April 2, 2015; 11 years ago
- Current status: Active

Lionsgate+ (previously Starzplay), or also known as Starz (in the United States of America and Canada), Starzplay Arabia & Starz On (in the MENA region), Lionsgate Play (in the Southeast Asia region) is an International subscription video on-demand over-the-top streaming television service owned by Starz Entertainment for viewers outside North America.

== History ==
=== Development and Launch ===
Starzplay logo

The original incarnation of Starzplay was a website and mobile app that featured original programming and feature film content from Starz available for streaming in standard or high definition. It was available to Starz subscribers of Verizon FIOS, AT&T U-verse, Cox Communications, Xfinity by Comcast and DirecTV until it was merged with Starz.com on April 5, 2016. The former incarnation of the Starzplay online service (which is structured as a TV Everywhere-style service) was launched on October 8, 2012, with the release of the iPad, iPhone and iPod Touch app until they were merged with Starz.com on April 5, 2016.

The Starzplay name was borrowed from a prior service offered in conjunction with Netflix. It was created in 2008 after the subscription streaming service struck an agreement with Starz Entertainment to allow Netflix to sub-license rights to films from distributors that maintain output deals with the linear Starz channel for online viewing – in lieu of acquiring the digital distribution rights on its own, due to the expense of acquiring newer film titles – as Netflix was considered to be merely a "content aggregator". Because Netflix chose to sub-license digital rights through Starz instead of negotiating with the studios, Walt Disney Studios Motion Pictures threatened not to renew its output deal with Starz unless it either discontinued its deal with Netflix or paid Disney a licensing fee for digital streaming rights to its films (Netflix ended up assuming rights to most film releases by Walt Disney Studios from Starz in 2016).

Starzplay (as a Netflix service) was first made available to Starz subscribers of the Verizon FiOS television service. Starz content (including most of its original programming and series content that the channel acquired through domestic and foreign distributors) was made available on Netflix's "Watch Instantly" platform. It was the third subscription video-on-demand online streaming service operated by Starz: Starz Ticket operated from 2004 to 2006, under a joint venture between Starz Entertainment and RealNetworks. Starz launched Vongo, a separate online movie service for subscribers, which operated from 2006 until it was discontinued on September 30, 2008.

On September 1, 2011, Starz announced that it would not renew its streaming agreement with Netflix, which ended on February 28, 2012; movie titles that are available on DVD from Sony Pictures, Disney and other studios that maintain pay-TV distribution deals with Starz were not affected and can be acquired from Netflix by this method. With the expiration of the Netflix deal, film content from studios with which Starz maintains broadcast rights were no longer available for online streaming, particularly as Netflix and certain similar services such as Vudu did not have separate streaming rights to films from these individual studios. Prior to the beta launch of its Starz Online service (which became Starzplay upon its official launch), Starz announced on November 18, 2011, that it was developing a streaming application for mobile devices, allowing the network's subscribers – and in early reports, speculation that possibly non-subscription television subscribers would be allowed as well – to view Starz's series and film content. The app was released on October 9, 2012, for Apple's iPad, iPhone and iPod Touch, and on May 7, 2013, for Android devices. An app for authenticated subscribers for the Xbox 360 was released on December 3, 2013, followed by a similar app for the Xbox One on August 5, 2014.

=== Launch of Starzplay Arabia, international expansion and rebranding ===
Starzplay Arabia was the first Starz-branded service to be localized outside the United States, launching in collaboration with Peter Ekelund's Parsifal International on April 2, 2015, in 17 countries in the Middle East and North Africa (MENA) region, breaching those territories before its biggest competitor in media streaming being Netflix. Starzplay Arabia remains available even as the U.S. version of the service has been discontinued. In 2018, the service became available in Pakistan, as a joint venture between Cinepax, a cinema chain in Pakistan, and Lionsgate's StarzPlay Arabia. In 2019, Starzplay was launched in Brazil and Europe (France, Germany, Ireland, Spain and the United Kingdom). In 2020, it became available in Argentina, Chile, and Italy. In March 2022, a 57% majority stake in Starzplay Arabia was acquired by a consortium, led by e& (formerly known as Etisalat) and the Abu Dhabi-based investment group ADQ. The deal was valued at $420m. In January 2021, Starzplay Arabia signed a deal with Abu Dhabi Media, which allows subscribers to watch UFC fights and events live.

In several countries, the service has been provided through partnerships with cable services, such as Vodafone in Spain, Movistar TV in Argentina, IndiHome in Indonesia and PLDT Home in the Philippines or within Apple TV as well.

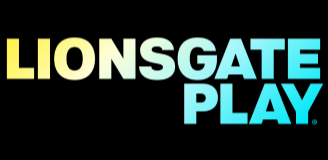
Lionsgate Play logo

On September 28, 2022, Lionsgate announced the international Starzplay service would be rebranded as Lionsgate+ the following day in most countries, eliminating much of the conflict between Lionsgate and Disney's Star brand. The Starzplay Arabia and Lionsgate Play services would not be affected at that time, while Starz in the U.S. and Canada merely rebranded with a new version of the "STARZ" logo.

In November 2022, it was announced that Lionsgate+ was ending operations in the markets of France, Germany, Italy, Spain, Benelux, the Nordics, and Japan before the end of the company's fiscal year.

In August 2023, Lionsgate announced that Lionsgate+ would leave Latin America on December 31, 2023. In November, the shutdown date was changed to December 11, 2023, while customers who have accessed Lionsgate+ through Amazon Prime Video would have continued to access streaming until February 9, 2024.

On November 4, 2023, Lionsgate announced that Lionsgate+ would cease its operations in the UK in early 2024. On December 19, it was confirmed that the shutdown date would be on February 29, 2024.

On November 14, 2024, Lionsgate+ became available in New Zealand as an add-on subscription via Amazon Prime Video.

On January 13, 2026, Lionsgate sold Lionsgate Play's Indian and Southeast Asian operations to the streaming service's president Rohit Jain for an undisclosed sum. As part of the transaction, Jain left Lionsgate and secured a multi-year licensing agreement to use the Lionsgate name for the service as well as access to catalog content for the streamer.

On April 9, 2026, Lionsgate+ became available in the United States as an add-on subscription via Amazon Prime Video.

== Programming ==
=== Lionsgate+ original programming ===
Title	Genre	Premiere	Seasons	Runtime	Exclusive region(s)	Language
Express	Thriller	January 16, 2022	2 seasons, 16 episodes	60 min	Spain & Latin America (Note: Season 2 only aired in Latin America.)	Spanish
Señorita 89 (Note: Co-production with Pantaya.)	Drama	February 27, 2022	1 season, 8 episodes	40–45 min	Latin America	Spanish
All Those Things We Never Said (Note: Co-production with Canal+.)	Comedy drama	December 15, 2022	1 season, 10 episodes	30 min	Europe and Latin America	French
Nacho	Biopic dark comedy	March 3, 2023	1 season, 8 episodes	50 min	Latin America	Spanish

==== Starzplay Arabia original programming ====
Title	Genre	Premiere	Seasons	Runtime	Exclusive region(s)	Language
Kaboos	Horror drama	9 February 2023	1 season, 5 episodes	24 min	MENA	Arabic
The Chamber	Psychological drama	22 June 2023	1 season, 13 episodes	44–54 min	MENA	Arabic
Million Dollar Listing: UAE	Reality show	15 September 2023	2 seasons, 21 episodes	48–54 min	MENA	Arabic
Carz on Starz	Reality show	18 December 2023	1 season, 6 episodes	48–54 min	MENA	Arabic
The Promise	Historical drama	11 January 2024	1 season, 8 episodes	48–54 min	MENA	Arabic
Unstoppable: The Italian Dream	Reality show	28 November 2024	1 season, 7 episodes	48–54 min	MENA	Arabic
Coffeecature	Animation	1 March 2025	2 seasons, 61 episodes	1 min	MENA	Arabic
Kharej An Al Maalof	Drama	20 August 2025	1 season, 8 episodes	40 min	MENA	Arabic
Hareem Al Jarrah	Drama	21 September 2025	1 season, 11 episodes	40 min	MENA	Arabic
Maa Joelle	Reality show	20 February 2026	1 season, 30 episodes	40 min	MENA	Arabic

==== Starzplay by Cinepax original programming ====
Title	Genre	Premiere	Seasons	Runtime	Exclusive region(s)	Language
Khel Tamasha	Comedy drama	14 May 2021	1 season, 5 episodes	38–40 min	Pakistan	Urdu
Karachi Division	Action drama	21 September 2021	1 season, 6 episodes	38–40 min	Pakistan	Urdu
Mumkin	Action drama	18 March 2022	1 season, 9 episodes	38–40 min	Pakistan	Urdu

==== Lionsgate Play original programming ====
Title	Genre	Premiere	Seasons	Runtime	Exclusive region(s)	Language
Hiccups and Hookups	Comedy drama	26 November 2021	1 season, 8 episodes	38–40 min	India	Hindi
Jugaadistan	Comedy drama	4 March 2022	1 season, 8 episodes	40 min	India	Hindi
Feels Like Home	Comedy drama	10 June 2022	2 seasons, 12 episodes	40 min	India	Hindi
Minus One	Romantic comedy	14 February 2023	2 seasons, 12 episodes	32 min	India	Hindi
