= Vardan Singh =

Indian playback singer

- Born: 19 May 1983 (age 42); Jaunpur, Jaunpur District, Uttar Pradesh, India
- Occupations: Playback singer Performer
- Years active: 2005-present
- Label: Zee Music Company
- Spouse: Anshika Singh (m. 2008)

Vardan Singh (born 19 May 1983) is an Indian Playback singer and music director. He first gained popularity for his song Kabhi Yun Bhi from the movie Ishq Junoon.

== Early life and education ==
Vardan Singh was born to a business family in Jaunpur, the district of Uttar Pradesh. He was brought up in Lucknow, Nawabon Ka Shahar. Vardan did his schooling from Lucknow. He is graduated from University of Lucknow. Vardan Singh is trained in classical music from Late Pandit Ganesh Prasad Mishra who is a well known 'A' grade artist in Hindustani Classical music.

== Career ==
Vardan started his career as a background musician. He first sang for Anjaan movie, directed by Hansal Mehta. He got popularity when he sang for Bollywood film Ishq Junoon. The song Kabhi Yun Bhi. from Ishq Junoon broken many records and got the place in UK top 10 music list.

== Filmography ==
=== Singing ===
Key
†	Denotes films that have not yet been released

Year	Film	Song	Notes
2005	Anjaan	-	Directed by Hansal Mehta
2010	Rakta Charitra	Karma Dharma	Released
2010	Rann	Sikkon Ki Bhookh	Released
2013	War Chhod Na Yaar	Ishq Mein	Released
2016	Ishq Junoon	Kabhi Yun Bhi	A great response by audience
2019	Mushkil		
2023	Coat (film)		

=== Background music ===
- Shaadi Se Pehle-2006
- Apna Sapna Money Money-2006
- Kaafila-2007
- Heroes
- Main Aurr Mrs Khanna-2009
- Yamla Pagla Deewana-2011
- Chaar Din Ki Chandni- 2012
- All Is Well- 2015
