= 2021 Filmfare OTT Awards =

Annual OTT film awards in India

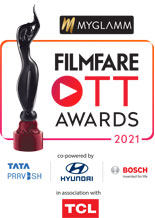
- Awarded for: Excellence in OTT content
- Date: 9 December 2021
- Venue: Mumbai
- Country: India
- Presented by: Filmfare
- First award: 19 December 2020

Highlights
- Most awards: Scam 1992: The Harshad Mehta Story (12)
- Most nominations: Mirzapur (Season 2) & Scam 1992: The Harshad Mehta Story (14)
- Best Drama Series: Scam 1992: The Harshad Mehta Story
- Best Comedy Series: Gullak (Season 2)
- Best Film - Web Originals: Serious Men
- Best Non - Fiction Original (Series): Bad Boy Billionaires: India
- Best Series (Critics): Mirzapur (Season 2)
- Website: 2021 Filmfare OTT Awards

2021 Filmfare OTT Awards, the second edition of awards show was held on 9 December 2021 in Mumbai. These awards honour artistic and technical excellence in original programming on over-the-top streaming media in Hindi-language. Web original shows or films released across OTT platforms between 1 August 2020 and 31 July 2021 were eligible for Awards. Nominations were announced by Filmfare on 2 December 2021.

Mirzapur (Season 2) and Scam 1992: The Harshad Mehta Story led the ceremony with 14 nominations each, followed by The Family Man (Season 2) with 12 nominations and Grahan with 10 nominations.

Scam 1992: The Harshad Mehta Story won 12 awards, including Best Drama Series, Best Director in a Drama Series (for Hansal Mehta and Jai Mehta) and Best Actor in a Drama Series (for Pratik Gandhi), thus becoming the most-awarded series at the ceremony.

== Winners and nominees ==
Sources: nominations

Sources: winners

- Winners denoted in **boldface**

=== Popular awards ===
Drama Series
Best Series	Best Director
**Scam 1992: The Harshad Mehta Story –** SonyLIV; Aashram (Season 2) – MX Player; Criminal Justice: Behind Closed Doors – Hotstar; Grahan – Hotstar; Mirzapur (Season 2) – Amazon Prime Video; The Family Man (Season 2) – Amazon Prime Video	**Hansal Mehta and Jai Mehta – Scam 1992: The Harshad Mehta Story**; Gurmeet Singh and Mihir Desai – Mirzapur (Season 2); Prakash Jha – Aashram (Season 2); Raj & DK and Suparn S Varma – The Family Man (Season 2); Ranjan Chandel – Grahan; Rohan Sippy and Arjun Mukerjee – Criminal Justice: Behind Closed Doors
Best Actor (Male)	Best Actor (Female)
**Pratik Gandhi – Scam 1992: The Harshad Mehta Story**; Anshumaan Pushkar – Grahan; Atul Kulkarni – City Of Dreams (Season 2); Bobby Deol – Aashram (Season 2); Manoj Bajpayee – The Family Man (Season 2); Pankaj Tripathi – Criminal Justice: Behind Closed Doors	**Samantha Ruth Prabhu – The Family Man (Season 2)**; Huma Qureshi – Maharani; Kirti Kulhari – Criminal Justice: Behind Closed Doors; Shreya Dhanwanthary – Scam 1992: The Harshad Mehta Story; Shweta Tripathi – Mirzapur (Season 2); Zoya Hussain – Grahan
Best Supporting Actor (Male)	Best Supporting Actor (Female)
**Sharib Hashmi – The Family Man (Season 2)**; Ali Fazal – Mirzapur (Season 2); Chandan Roy Sanyal – Aashram (Season 2); Divyenddu Sharma – Mirzapur (Season 2); Naseeruddin Shah – Bandish Bandits; Pankaj Tripathi – Mirzapur (Season 2)	**Amruta Subhash – Bombay Begums**; Anjali Barot – Scam 1992: The Harshad Mehta Story; Anupriya Goenka – Criminal Justice: Behind Closed Doors; Shahana Goswami – Bombay Begums; Sheeba Chaddha – Bandish Bandits
Comedy Series
Best Series / Special
**Gullak (Season 2)** – SonyLIV; Aalas Motapa Ghabraahat – Amazon Prime Video; College Romance (Season 2) – SonyLIV; Hostel Daze (Season 2) – Amazon Prime Video; Masaba Masaba – Netflix; Metro Park (Season 2) – Eros Now
Best Actor (Male)	Best Actor (Female)
**Jameel Khan – Gullak (Season 2)**; Adarsh Gourav – Hostel Daze (Season 2); Naveen Kasturia – Runaway Lugaai; Ranvir Shorey – Metro Park (Season 2); Sunil Grover – Sunflower; Vijay Verma – OK Computer	**Geetanjali Kulkarni – Gullak (Season 2)**; Kani Kusruti – OK Computer; Masaba Gupta – Masaba Masaba; Ruhi Singh – Runaway Lugaai
Best Supporting Actor (Male)	Best Supporting Actor (Female)
**Vaibhav Raj Gupta – Gullak (Season 2)**; Nikhil Vijay – Hostel Daze (Season 2); Sanjay Mishra – Runaway Lugaai	**Sunita Rajwar – Gullak (Season 2)**; Grusha Kapoor – Hey Prabhu! (Season 2); Neena Gupta – Masaba Masaba; Purbi Joshi – Metro Park (Season 2)
Web Originals
Best Film
**Serious Men** – Netflix; Ajeeb Daastaans – Netflix; Kaagaz – Zee5; Mee Raqsam – Zee5; Ray – Netflix; State of Siege: Temple Attack – Zee5
Best Actor (Male)	Best Actor (Female)
**Nawazuddin Siddiqui – Serious Men**; Bobby Deol – Class Of '83; Manav Kaul – Ajeeb Daastaans; Manoj Bajpayee – Ray; Naseeruddin Shah – Mee Raqsam; Pankaj Tripathi – Kaagaz	**Konkona Sen Sharma – Ajeeb Daastaans**; Aditi Sharma – Mee Raqsam; Kajol – Tribhanga; Ratna Pathak Shah – Unpaused – Segment: Chand Mubaarak; Richa Chadha – Unpaused – Segment: Apartment; Sanya Malhotra – Pagglait
Best Supporting Actor (Male)	Best Supporting Actor (Female)
**Ashutosh Rana – Pagglait**; Aakshath Das – Serious Men; Bhupendra Jadawat – Class of '83; Roshan Mathew – Choked; Satish Kaushik – Kaagaz	**Radhika Madan – Ray**; Gauhar Khan – 14 Phere; Mithila Palkar – Tribhanga; Sayani Gupta – Pagglait; Tanvi Azmi – Tribhanga
Best Non – Fiction Original (Series)
**Bad Boy Billionaires: India** – Netflix; Fabulous Lives Of Bollywood Wives – Netflix; LOL – Hasee Toh Phasee – Amazon Prime Video; Secrets Of Sinauli – Discovery+; Vande Bharat Flight IX 1344: Hope To Survival – Discovery+
Writing Awards
Best Original Story (Series)	Best Dialogues
**Raj & DK** **and Suman Kumar – The Family Man (Season 2)**; Amritpal Singh Bindra and Anand Tiwari – Bandish Bandits; Habib Faisal – Aashram (Season 2); Puneet Krishna and Vineet Krishna – Mirzapur (Season 2); Subhash Kapoor and Nandan Singh – Maharani	**Sumit Purohit, Saurav Dey, Vaibhav Vishal and Karan Vyas – Scam 1992: The Harshad Mehta Story**; Manan Mehta and Anshul Gupta – Mirzapur (Season 2); Shan Mohammed – Grahan; Sumeet Kotian – The Family Man (Season 2); Sushant Mishra and Shailendra Vyas – JL50
Best Original Screenplay	Best Adapted Screenplay
**Raj & DK'**, Suman Kumar and Suparn S Verma – The Family Man (Season 2)'; Amritpal Singh Bindra and Lara Chandni – Bandish Bandits; Deepesh Sumitra Jagdish – Aspirants; Kuldeep Ruhil – Aashram (Season 2); Puneet Krishna and Vineet Krishna – Mirzapur (Season 2); Subhash Kapoor, Nandan Singh and Umashankar Singh – Maharani	**Sumit Purohit and Saurav Dey – Scam 1992: The Harshad Mehta Story**; Apurva Asrani – Criminal Justice: Behind Closed Doors; Jaya Misra and Surbhi Saral – The Married Woman; Kunal Marathe – Indori Ishq; Prateek Payodhi, Vibha Singh and Shailendra Jha – Grahan
Music Awards
Best Background Music (Series)	Best Original Soundtrack (Series)
**Achint Thakkar – Scam 1992: The Harshad Mehta Story**; Anurag Saikia – Gullak (Season 2); Daniel B. George – Grahan; John Stewart Eduri – Mirzapur (Season 2); Soumil Shringarpure – Bandish Bandits	**Achint Thakkar – Scam 1992: The Harshad Mehta Story**; R. Rajesh, Sachin–Jigar, Fiddlecraft, Bindhumalini, Mahesh Shankar and Harpreet – The Family Man (Season 2); Rohit Sharma and Nilopal Bora – Aspirants; Shankar–Ehsaan–Loy – Bandish Bandits; Simran Hora – Gullak (Season 2)

=== Critics' Choice Awards ===
Best Series	Best Director (Series)
**Mirzapur (Season 2) – Amazon Prime Video**	**Raj & DK** **– The Family Man (Season 2)**
Best Actor (Male): Drama	Best Actor (Female): Drama
**Manoj Bajpayee – The Family Man (Season 2) as Srikant Tiwari**	**Huma Qureshi – Maharani as Rani Bharti**
Best Actor (Male): Comedy	Best Actor (Female): Comedy
**Sunil Grover – Sunflower as Sonu Singh**	**Kani Kusruti – OK Computer as Monalisa Paul**

=== Technical awards ===
Technical Awards
Best Editor
**Kunal Walve, Sumit Purohit – Scam 1992: The Harshad Mehta Story**; Gazal Dhaliwal, Aarsh Vora and Sunayana Kumari – Mismatched; Gourav Gopal Jha – Gullak (Season 2); Puneet Krishna and Vineet Krishna – Mirzapur (Season 2); Raj & DK, Suman Kumar, Suparn S Verma and Manoj Kumar Kalaivanan – The Family Man (Season 2); Saurabh Khanna, Suprith Kundar and Harish Peddinti – Hostel Daze (Season 2)
Best Production Design	Best Cinematographer
**Payal Ghose and Tapan Shrivastava – Scam 1992: The Harshad Mehta Story**; Rakesh Yadav – High; Saini S. Johray – The Family Man (Season 2); Sonam Singh and Abhijit Gaonkar – Mirzapur (Season 2); Udai Prakash Singh – Aashram (Season 2); Wasiq Khan – Grahan	**Pratham Mehta – Scam 1992: The Harshad Mehta Story**; Cameron Eric Bryson – The Family Man (Season 2); Chandan Kowli – Aashram (Season 2); Jayesh Nair – The Last Hour; Kamaljeet Negi – Grahan; Sanjay Kapoor – Mirzapur (Season 2)
Best Costume	Best VFX
**Arun J. Chauhan – Scam 1992: The Harshad Mehta Story**; Hazel Paul – Bandish Bandits; Maxima Basu and Ajay KMR – Grahan; Neelanchal Ghosh and Darshan Jalan – Mirzapur (Season 2); Smiti Kaur – Gullak (Season 2)	**Raghav Rai – Scam 1992: The Harshad Mehta Story**; Imagery Pictures – OK Computer; Nitesh Sharma and Nitesh Kumar – JL50; Resonance Digital – Chhatrasal

== Superlatives ==
=== Nominations and wins by program ===
Nominations by program
Nominations	Program	Streaming Media
14	Mirzapur (Season 2)	Amazon Prime Video
14	Scam 1992: The Harshad Mehta Story	SonyLIV
12	The Family Man (Season 2)	Amazon Prime Video
10	Grahan	Hotstar
9	Gullak (Season 2)	SonyLIV
8	Aashram (Season 2)	MX Player
7	Bandish Bandits	Amazon Prime Video
6	Criminal Justice: Behind Closed Doors	Hotstar
5	Hostel Daze (Season 2)	Amazon Prime Video
3	Kaagaz	ZEE5
3	Maharani	SonyLIV
3	Masaba Masaba	Netflix
3	Mee Raqsam	ZEE5
3	Metro Park (Season 2)	Eros Now
3	OK Computer	Hotstar
3	Pagglait	Netflix
3	Ray	Netflix
3	Runaway Lugaai	MX Player
3	Serious Men	Netflix
3	Tribhanga	Netflix
2	Aspirants	TVF Play
2	Bombay Begums	Netflix
2	Class of '83	Netflix
2	JL50	SonyLIV
2	Unpaused	Amazon Prime Video

Wins by program
Wins	Program	Streaming Media
12	Scam 1992: The Harshad Mehta Story	SonyLIV
6	The Family Man (Season 2)	Amazon Prime Video
5	Gullak (Season 2)	SonyLIV
2	Serious Men	Netflix

=== Nominations and wins by streaming media ===
Nominations by streaming media
Nominations	Streaming Media
43	Amazon Prime Video
29	SonyLIV
26	Netflix
20	Hotstar
15	MX Player
10	ZEE5
3	Eros Now
2	Discovery+
2	TVF Play

Wins by Streaming Media
Wins	Streaming Media
18	SonyLIV
7	Amazon Prime Video
7	Netflix

== See also ==
- Filmfare Awards
- 67th Filmfare Awards
