= Urvi Ashar =

Indian voice actress

- Born: Mumbai, Maharashtra, India
- Occupation: Voice actress
- Years active: 1998-Current
- Spouse: Gaurang Sampat (m. 2010)

Urvi Ashar is an Indian voice-dubbing actress who speaks English, Hindi, Kutchi, Gujarati, and Marathi. She has been active in the voice acting business since 1998.

== Filmography ==
=== Commercials ===
Year	Promo	Language
2008	Barbie-n-Me Barbie Style	English
2010	Fisher-Price Stride to ride Lion	English

=== Animated films ===
Year	Film title	Role	Language	Notes
2014	Manav	Kanta	Hindi	

== Career ==
Ashar has voiced television commercials. She specializes in dubbing for young boys, teenage girls, and young women.

She is also known as the official Hindi-dubbing voice for south Indian actresses like Tamannaah Bhatia, Shruti Haasan, Kajal Agarwal, and Hansika Motwani in most of their Telugu and Tamil films.

== Dubbing roles ==
=== Live action series ===
Title	Actress	Role	Dub language	Original language	Episodes	Original airdate	Dubbed airdate	Notes
Drake & Josh	Allison Scagliotti	Mindy Crenshaw	Hindi	English	56	11 January 2004 - 16 September 2007		
Power Rangers Zeo	Catherine Sutherland	Katherine "Kat" Hillard/Zeo Ranger I - Pink	Hindi	English	50	April 20, 1996 - November 27, 1996	Unknown	Based on Japanese Tokusatsu, Chouriki Sentai Ohranger.
Power Rangers Turbo	Catherine Sutherland	Katherine "Kat" Hillard/Pink Turbo Ranger	Hindi	English	45 (19 dubbed)	April 19, 1997 - November 24, 1997	Unknown	Based on Japanese Tokusatsu, Gekisou Sentai Carranger.

=== Animated series ===
Program title	Original voice	Character	Dub language	Original language	Number of episodes	Original airdate	Dubbed airdate	Notes
Phineas and Ferb	Ashley Tisdale	Candace Flynn	Hindi	English	222	8/17/2007-6/12/2015	6/1/2008-6/28/2015	
Adventure Time	Hynden Walch Niki Yang	Princess Bubblegum BMO	Hindi	English	283	April 5, 2010 – September 3, 2018		
Gravity Falls	Kristen Schaal	Mabel Pines	Hindi	English	40	June 15, 2012 – February 15, 2016		
Transformers: Prime	Sumalee Montano	Arcee	Hindi	English	65	November 29, 2010 – July 26, 2013		
Dragon Ball Z	Miki Itō (JP); Meredith McCoy (EN)	Android 18	Hindi	Japanese	291	4/26/1989- 1/31/1996	2001-2008	The Hindi dub of the series was based on the edited 1995 Funimation Entertainment-Saban Entertainment-Ocean Productions English dub.
Naruto	Junko Takeuchi	Naruto Uzumaki	Hindi	Japanese	220	10/3/2002- 2/8/2007	2008 (stopped)	cartoon network version
Pokémon	Kaori (JP); Veronica Taylor (Seasons 6–8); Michele Knotz (Seasons 9) (EN)	May (Haruka)	Hindi	Japanese	1000+	4/1/1997-Current	5/12/2003-2015	
Ninja Hattori-kun	Yūko Mita	Shinzo Hattori	Hindi	Japanese	694	9/28/1981- 12/25/1987		Airs on Nickelodeon India.
Tsurupika Hagemaru	Yoshino Takamori	Miss Sakura	Hindi	Japanese	58	3/3/1988-6/10/1989		It was released as Hagemaru in India
Atashinchi	Masayo Kurata	Nohara	Hindi	Japanese	330	4/19/2002- 9/19/2009		
Kid vs. Kat	Kathleen Barr	Millie Burtonburger	Hindi	Canadian	52	25/10/2008- 4/6/2011	2017 (stopped)	Aired on Disney XD India
Ghost Stories	Kumi Sakuma	Momoko Koigakubo	Hindi	Japanese	20	10/22/2000- 3/25/2001		Aired on Nickelodeon India.
Rapunzel's Tangled Adventure	Eden Espinosa	Cassandra	Hindi	English		2017-18	2017-18	The Singing Voice in the song I've Got This is done by Rashi Rautela and in the song Ready as I'll Ever Be the singing voice is done by Ayushi Gupta.

=== Live-action films ===
==== Foreign language films ====
Film title	Actor	Character	Dub language	Original language	Original year release	Dub year release	Notes
The Lord of the Rings: The Fellowship of the Ring	Liv Tyler	Arwen Undómiel	Hindi	English	2001	2002	
The Lord of the Rings: The Two Towers	Liv Tyler	Arwen Undómiel	Hindi	English	2002	2003	
The Lord of the Rings: The Return of the King	Liv Tyler	Arwen Undómiel	Hindi	English	2003	2004	
Man of Steel	Amy Adams	Lois Lane	Hindi	English	2013	2013	Performed alongside Ashiesh Roy who voiced Michael Shannon as General Zod, Shakti Singh who voiced Russell Crowe as Jor-El in Hindi version.
Batman v Superman: Dawn of Justice	Amy Adams	Lois Lane	Hindi	English	2016	2016	
Justice League	Amy Adams	Lois Lane	Hindi	English	2017	2017	
Ben 10: Alien Swarm	Alyssa Diaz	Elena Validus	Hindi	English	2009	2009	Performed alongside Sanket Mhatre who voiced Ryan Kelley as Ben Tennyson in Hindi version.
Captain America: The Winter Soldier	Emily VanCamp	Sharon Carter / Agent 13	Hindi	English	2014	2014	Performed alongside Joy Sengupta who voiced Chris Evans as Steve Rogers / Captain America in Hindi.
Captain America: Civil War	Emily VanCamp	Sharon Carter / Agent 13	Hindi	English	2016	2016	
The Monkey King 2	Gong Li	Bai Gu Jing	Hindi	Chinese	2016	2016	
Sky High	Danielle Panabaker	Layla Williams	Hindi	English	2005		Aired by Disney
V for Vendetta	Natalie Portman	Evey Hammond	Hindi	English	2006	2012	Voiced for the UTV Software Communications in-house production Hindi dub that aired on UTV Action.
Life of Pi	Shravanthi Sainath	Anandi	Hindi	English	2012	2012	
Spider-Man: Homecoming	Laura Harrier	Liz Allan	Hindi	English	2017	2017	
The Bounty Hunter	Jennifer Aniston	Nicole Hurley	Hindi	English	2010	2010	Performed with Saptrishi Ghosh who voiced Gerard Butler as Milo Boyd in Hindi.

==== Indian films ====
Film title	Actor	Character	Dub language	Original language	Original year release	Dub year release	Notes
Zindaggi Rocks	Kim Sharma	Joy	Hindi	Hindi	2006		
Go Goa Gone	Puja Gupta	Luna	Hindi	Hindi	2013		
Nautanki Saala!	Pooja Salvi	Nandini Patel	Hindi	Hindi	2013		
Andhrudu	Gowri Pandit	Archana	Hindi	Telugu	2005	2005	The Hindi dub was titled: Loha - The Ironman.
Enthiran	Unknown	Artificial Intelligence Museum Guide	Hindi	Tamil	2010	2010	The Hindi dub was titled: Robot.
Parugu	Sheela Kaur	Meenakshi	Hindi	Telugu	2008	2010	The Hindi dub was titled: Veerta: The Power. Performed alongside Sanket Mhatre who voiced Allu Arjun as Krishna in Hindi.
Simha	Sneha Ullal	Janaki	Hindi	Telugu	2010	2011	
Oosaravelli	Tamannaah Bhatia	Niharika	Hindi	Telugu	2011	2012	The Hindi dub was titled: Mar Mitenge. Performed alongside Sanket Mhatre who voiced Jr. NTR as Tony in Hindi.
Brindavanam	Kajal Aggarwal	Bhoomi	Hindi	Telugu	2010	2012	The Hindi dub was titled: The Super Khiladi. Performed alongside Sanket Mhatre who voiced Jr. NTR as Krish and Pooja Punjabi who voiced Samantha Akkineni as Indu in Hindi.
Annayya	Soundarya †	Devi	Hindi	Telugu	2000	2012	The Hindi dub was titled: Khoon Ka Rishta.
Julai	Ileana D'Cruz (voice in original version dubbed by Haritha)	Madhu	Hindi	Telugu	2012	2013	The Hindi dub was titled: Dangerous Khiladi; Performed alongside Sanket Mhatre who voiced Allu Arjun as Ravindra Narayan (Ravi) in Hindi.
Gabbar Singh	Shruti Haasan	Bhagyalakshmi	Hindi	Telugu	2012	2013	The Hindi dub was titled: Policewala Gunda.
Dhada	Kajal Aggarwal	Rhea (Priya in Hindi version)	Hindi	Telugu	2011	2013	Performed alongside Sanket Mhatre who voiced Naga Chaitanya as Viswa in Hindi.
Darling	Kajal Aggarwal	Nandini	Hindi	Telugu	2010	2013	The Hindi dub was titled: Sabse Badhkar Hum.
Shadow	Taapsee Pannu	Madhubala	Hindi	Telugu	2013	2013	The Hindi dub was titled: Meri Jung: One Man Army.
Singam II	Hansika Motwani (voice in original version dubbed by Savitha Reddy)	Sathya (Sania in Hindi version)	Hindi	Tamil	2013	2013	The Hindi dub was titled: Main Hoon Surya Singham II.
Businessman	Kajal Aggarwal	Chitra Bhardwaj	Hindi	Telugu	2012	2013	The Hindi dub was titled: No. 1 Businessman. Performed alongside Sanket Mhatre who voiced Mahesh Babu as Surya Bhai in Hindi.
Chirutha	Neha Sharma	Sanjana	Hindi	Telugu	2007	2013	Performed alongside Sanket Mhatre who voiced Ram Charan as Charan in Hindi.
Naayak	Kajal Aggarwal	Madhu	Hindi	Telugu	2013	2014	The Hindi dub was titled: Double Attack. Performed alongside Sanket Mhatre who voiced Ram Charan as Siddharth and Cherry in Hindi.
Chakram	Asin Thottumkal	Lakshmi	Hindi	Telugu	2005	2014	
Magadheera	Kajal Aggarwal	Mithravinda Devi/Indu	Hindi	Telugu	2009	2014	Performed alongside Sanket Mhatre who voiced Ram Charan as Kala Bhairava and Harsha in Hindi.
Veeram	Tamannaah Bhatia	Koppuram Devi (Gopi Devi in Hindi version)	Hindi	Tamil	2014	2014	The Hindi dub was titled: Veeram - The Powerman.
Rebel	Tamannaah Bhatia	Nandini	Hindi	Telugu	2012	2014	The Hindi dub was titled: The Return Of Rebel.
7 Aum Arivu	Shruti Haasan	Subha Srinivasan (Sudha in Hindi version)	Hindi	Tamil	2011	2014	The Hindi dub was titled: Chennai v/s China. Performed alongside Sanket Mhatre who voiced Suriya as Bodhidharma and Aravind in Hindi.
Mr. Perfect	Kajal Aggarwal	Priya	Hindi	Telugu	2011	2014	The Hindi dub was titled: No. 1 Mr. Perfect.
Balupu	Shruti Haasan	Shruti	Hindi	Telugu	2013	2014	The Hindi dub was titled: Jani Dushman.
1: Nenokkadine	Kriti Sanon	Sameera	Hindi	Telugu	2014	2014	The Hindi dub was titled: 1: Ek Ka Dum. Performed alongside Sanket Mhatre who voiced Mahesh Babu as Gautham in Hindi.
Racha	Tamannaah Bhatia	Chaitra	Hindi	Telugu	2012	2014	The Hindi dub was titled: Betting Raja. Performed alongside Sanket Mhatre who voiced Ram Charan as Raj in Hindi.
Jilla	Kajal Aggarwal	Shanthi	Hindi	Tamil	2014	2014	The Hindi dub was titled: Policewala Gunda 2.
Vedam	Anushka Shetty	Saroja (Saroj in Hindi version)	Hindi	Telugu	2010	2014	The Hindi dub was titled: Antim Faisla.
Power	Hansika Motwani	Nirupama (Second Dub)	Hindi	Telugu	2014	2014	The Hindi dub was titled: Power Unlimited.
Padikkadavan	Tamannaah Bhatia	Gayathri	Hindi	Tamil	2009	2014	The Hindi dub was titled: Meri Taaqat Mera Faisla 2. Performed alongside Sachin Gole who voiced Dhanush as Radhakrishnan "Rocky" in Hindi.
Race Gurram	Shruti Haasan	Spandana (Bhavna in Hindi version)	Hindi	Telugu	2014	2014	The Hindi dub was titled: Main Hoon Lucky: The Racer. Performed alongside Sanket Mhatre who voiced Allu Arjun as Lucky in Hindi.
Gangotri	Aditi Agarwal	Gangotri	Hindi	Telugu	2003	2014	Performed alongside Sanket Mhatre who voiced Allu Arjun as Simhadri in Hindi
Rudhramadevi	Nithya Menen	Muktamba	Hindi	Telugu	2015	2015	
Lion	Trisha Krishnan	Guggilla Mahalakshmi / Manjula	Hindi	Telugu	2015	2015	The Hindi dub was titled: Ek Tsunami - Jwalamukhi.
Rabhasa	Pranitha Subhash	Bhagyam	Hindi	Telugu	2014	2015	The Hindi dub was titled: The Super Khiladi 2. Performed alongside Sanket Mhatre who voiced Jr. NTR as Karthik and Arranya Kaur who voiced Samantha Akkineni as Indu in Hindi.
Arrambam	Nayanthara	Maya	Hindi	Tamil	2013	2015	The Hindi dub was titled: Player - Ek Khiladi.
Aagadu	Tamannaah Bhatia	Saroja	Hindi	Telugu	2014	2015	The Hindi dub was titled: Encounter Shankar. Performed alongside Sanket Mhatre who voiced Mahesh Babu as Shankar in Hindi.
Thuppakki	Kajal Aggarwal	Nisha	Hindi	Tamil	2012	2015	The Hindi dub was titled: Indian Soldier: Never On Holiday.
Kandireega	Hansika Motwani	Shruthi	Hindi	Telugu	2011	2015	The Hindi dub was titled: Dangerous Khiladi 4.
Yevadu	Shruti Haasan (voice in original version dubbed by Sowmya Sharma)	Manju	Hindi	Telugu	2014	2015	Performed alongside Sanket Mhatre who voiced Ram Charan as Charan and Satya in Hindi.
Cameraman Gangatho Rambabu	Tamannaah Bhatia	Ganga	Hindi	Telugu	2012	2016	The Hindi dub was titled: Mera Target. Performed alongside Rajesh Khattar who voiced Pawan Kalyan as Rambabu in Hindi.
Govindudu Andarivadele	Kajal Aggarwal	Satya	Hindi	Telugu	2014	2016	The Hindi dub was titled: Yevadu 2. Performed alongside Sanket Mhatre who voiced Ram Charan as Abhiram in Hindi.
Ishq	Nithya Menen	Priya	Hindi	Telugu	2012	2016	The Hindi dub was titled: Bhaigiri. Performed alongside Sanket Mhatre who voiced Nithiin as Rahul in Hindi.
Temper	Kajal Aggarwal	Shanvi	Hindi	Telugu	2015	2016	Performed alongside Sanket Mhatre who voiced Jr. NTR as Daya in Hindi.
Luv U Alia	Sangeeta Chauhan	Alia	Hindi	Kannada	2016	2016	
Tadakha	Tamannaah Bhatia	Pallavi	Hindi	Telugu	2013	2016	Performed alongside Sanket Mhatre who voiced Naga Chaitanya as Karthik in Hindi.
Vedalam	Shruti Haasan	Swetha	Hindi	Tamil	2015	2016	
Endukante... Premanta!	Tamannaah Bhatia	Sravanthi (Sharmila in Hindi version) / Srinidhi	Hindi	Telugu	2012	2016	The Hindi dub was titled: Dangerous Khiladi 5. Performed alongside Sanket Mhatre who voiced Ram Pothineni as Ram and Krishna in Hindi.
Jil	Rashi Khanna (voice in original version dubbed by Savitha Reddy)	Savithri (Sonali in Hindi version)	Hindi	Telugu	2015	2016	
Yennai Arindhaal	Trisha Krishnan	Hemanika	Hindi	Tamil	2015	2016	The Hindi dub was titled: Satyadev - The Fearless Cop.
Bengal Tiger	Tamannaah Bhatia	Meera	Hindi	Telugu	2015	2016	

=== Animated films ===
Film title	Original voice(s)	Character(s)	Dub language	Original language	Original year release	Dub year release	Notes
Barbie as Rapunzel	Chantal Strand	Kelly	Hindi	English	2002	2004	Kelly's character "Princess Katrina" in this film, was Hindi dubbed by Prachi Save Sathi.
Barbie of Swan Lake	Chantal Strand	Kelly	Hindi	English	2003	2004	Hindi dub released on VCD/DVD and aired on Television.
Barbie as the Island Princess	Kathleen Barr	Tiny	Hindi	English	2007	2007	
Barbie Mariposa	Tabitha St. Germain	Willa	Hindi	English	2008	2008	
Barbie and the Diamond Castle	Maryke Hendrikse Chantal Strand	Melody Stacie	Hindi	English	2008	2008	Only dialogues were dubbed with the original English songs. The Hindi dubbing credits were shown after the original staff credits and she was credited as: Urvi Asher.
Barbie: The Princess and the Popstar	Ashleigh Ball (speaking); Tiffany Giardina (singing)	Keira	Hindi	English	2012	2012	Barbie portrays as both Tori and Keira in this film.
Barbie in the Pink Shoes	Katie Crown	Hailey	Hindi	English	2013	2013	
Barbie: Mariposa and the Fairy Princess	Maryke Hendrikse Tabitha St. Germain	Princess Catania Willa	Hindi	English	2013	2013 (TV version)	Urvi Ashar has voiced for two characters in the TV version that aired on September 5, 2013, on Pogo. A VCD/DVD release had a different Hindi dubbing cast which was released before it on September 4, 2013.
Phineas and Ferb the Movie: Across the 2nd Dimension	Ashley Tisdale	Candace Flynn	Hindi	English	2011	2011	Aired on Disney Channel India on September 20, 201 and Disney XD India on October 2, 2011.
Transformers Prime Beast Hunters: Predacons Rising	Sumalee Montano	Arcee	Hindi	English	2013	2013	Television film
The Lego Movie	Elizabeth Banks	Lucy / Wyldstyle	Hindi	English	2014	2014	Hindi dub only created for the Home media release.

== See also ==
- Dubbing (filmmaking)
- List of Indian Dubbing Artists
