= No Average Angel =

Studio album by Tiffany Giardina
- Released: January 20, 2009
- Recorded: 2008
- Genre: Pop rock, bubblegum pop, pop punk
- Length: 42:08
- Label: 785
- Producer: Steve Walsh, PJ Bianco, and JP Rande

Tiffany Giardina chronology
We've Got Christmas (2005)	No Average Angel (2009)	Paper Made Hearts (2010)

Singles from No Average Angel
- 1. "Hurry Up and Save Me" Released: August 28, 2008; 2. "No Average Angel" Released: 2009

No Average Angel is the second studio album by American singer Tiffany Giardina. The album was released on January 20, 2009 through 785 Records and sold 2,400 copies in its first week. The singles, "Hurry Up and Save Me" and "No Average Angel" were also included on the Another Cinderella Story soundtrack.

== Composition ==
Recording sessions began in 2008. When asked about her album, Giardina responded "It’s basically just about being yourself and not being afraid to be who you are." In an interview with "Artist Direct", she talked about the songs on the album, saying "Every song has a different story, experience and vibe to it. I'm so excited for this album to come out. I really got involved in every aspect, from the writing to the artwork. It's very personal for me, and I couldn't be happier with it." She stated that her role-model is Audrey Hepburn. The closest song from the album for Giardina is "Falling Down", stating "The song's about persevering. If you're having a bad day, keep moving forward. If you're falling down, pick yourself back up and move on." When asked why she chose to cover "Eternal Flame" she said "It's one of my favorite songs! I had to do a cover of it. I totally wanted to sing it on the record. The president of my label is really into rock music, and that's one of his favorite songs too. That was everyone's choice for a cover." She also stated that she gets excited when she hears her songs on the radio by saying "The first time I heard 'No Average Angel' on the radio I freaked out. I was driving around blasting it, It's about being yourself, not being afraid to be different.

== Critical reception ==
Professional ratings
Review scores
Source	Rating
Artist Direct	3/5 stars
Allmusic	(D−)

"No Average Angel" gained mixed reviews. Amy Sciarretto, from Artist Direct, gave the album 3 out of 5 stars and wrote "On her debut album, the 15-year-old, New York City-reared songstress exudes bucketfuls of sass, tossing her long, curly tendrils and singing in a high pitch that will magnetically attract rebellious tweeners to her music." and "Giardina will certainly appeal to the pre-teen set in a way that Britney Spears no longer can. No Average Angel is a fluffy, frothy collection of bubblegum pop in a day and age where blowing bubbles is still fun!"

Farnaz Youshei from Campus Circle gave the album a D− writing "The 16-year-old, whose music has been featured in Another Cinderella Story and Disney's Tinker Bell, sounds like any other Disney-produced teen pop star. It is true that Giardina is not signed to the Disney label, however, it is hard not to notice the similarities between her resonance and those of Disney productions like Miley Cyrus. No Average Angel is just a regular one."

== Promotion ==
Giardina performed "No Average Angel" at the 2008 UBS Parade Spectacula in Stamford, Connecticut. On January 18, 2009, Giardina had a release party for her album at FYE in Port Chester, New York where she performed some of the songs off the album. A TV commercial aired on Nickelodeon and Disney Channel to promote the album which features a male announcer. She also performed songs from the album at the 2009 Bamboozle in New Jersey.

== Singles ==
The first single off the album was "Hurry Up and Save Me" and the second was "No Average Angel". Both music videos was shot in New York City. The videos have Tiffany running around New York City. She's clumsy and she runs into people. She finds herself in these weird scenarios. She ends up in Times Square singing to her friends. Both videos were directed by Andrew Bennett. Both singles were also on a miniature EP, also called "No Average Angel". It was only available for a limited edition. It was released November 25, 2008 only at FYE.

== Track listing ==
No.	Title	Writer(s)	Producer(s)	Length
1.	"No Average Angel"	Richard Hammond, Jill Walsh and Steve Walsh	S. Walsh	2:57
2.	"Sparks Fly"	Denise Rich, J. Walsh and S. Walsh	S. Walsh	3:07
3.	"Onto You"	PJ Bianco, JP Rende and Rich	Bianco and Rande	2:54
4.	"Make My Day"	David Mead, J. Walsh and S. Walsh	S. Walsh	2:59
5.	"Eternal Flame"	Susanna Lee Hoffs, Tom Kelly and William E. Steinberg	S. Walsh	3:32
6.	"You Haven't Asked Me Yet"	Bianco, Rende, J. Walsh and S. Walsh	S. Walsh	2:58
7.	"Candy (Mandy Moore cover)"	Anthony Battaglia, David Katz, Denny Keliman and Rich	Bianco and Rende	3:06
8.	"Don't Want to Let It Go"	Bianco, Tiffany Giardina and Rende	Bianco and Rende	2:49
9.	"Road to Anywhere"	Jason Lehning, J. Walsh and S. Walsh	S. Walsh	3:40
10.	"Falling Down"	Bianco, Janice Giardina, T. Giardina and Rende	Bianco and Rende	3:32
11.	"Summertime"	Jeff Franzel, Jill Walsh, and Steve Walsh	Steve Walsh	3:07
12.	"This Is My Life"	Hammond, J. Walsh and S. Walsh	S. Walsh	3:10
13.	"Lollipop"	Julius Dixon and Beverly Ross	Bianco and Rende	2:02
14.	"Hurry Up and Save Me"	Antonina Armato, Ralph Churchwell and Michael Nielsen	Churchwell and Nielsen	3:52

Tiffany Giardina Bonus DVD
No.	Title	Length
1.	"No Average Angel (music video)"
2.	"Hurry Up and Save Me (music video)"

Notes

- Song lengths, writing credits and producing credits taken from the No Average Angel liner notes.
- The first 1,000 copies of the album includes a DVD with the music videos for "No Average Angel" and "Hurry Up and Save Me".

== Personnel ==
Credits for No Average Angel adapted from Artist Direct.

- Tiffany Giardina - Lead Vocals
- Brian Malouf - Mixing
- Sean Hurley - Bass
- Dennis Leeflang - Drums on tracks 3, 7, 10, 13
- Mark Eichner - Executive Producer, A&R
- Jeff Franzel - Composer
- Jason Lehning - Piano, Fender Rhodes, Engineer, Composer
- Mike Beck - Organ, Engineer, Producer
- Beverly "Ruby" Ross - Composer
- Cynthia Cochrane - Production Coordination
- Ralph Churchwell - Composer, Producer
- Antonina Armato - Composer
- Denise Rich - Composer
- Julius Edward Dixon - Composer
- John Deaderick - Piano, Organ (Hammond), Wurlitzer
- David Mead - Composer
- Tal Herzberg - Mixing
- Kathryn Raio - Vocals (Background)
- Tim Marks - Bass
- Jimmy Farkas - Guitar
- Jill Walsh - Composer, Vocals (Background), Producer
- Kyle Ford - Engineer
- Tiffany Giardina - Composer
- Chris Decocco - Engineer
- James Frazee - Assistant Engineer
- Anthony Battaglia - Composer
- David Katz - Composer
- Ted Jensen - Mastering

== Charts ==
Chart (2009)	Peak position
Billboard Heatseekers Albums	8
Billboard Independent Albums	34
Billboard Top Internet Albums	214
