= Danish Husain =

Indian actor

- Other names: Dan Husain, Murtaza Danish Husain
- Occupations: Actor, thespian

Murtaza Danish Husaini, credited by his stage name Danish Husain, is an Indian actor, storyteller, poet and theatre director.

== Early life, family and education ==
Murtaza Danish Husaini was born into a Muslim family. His mother was a professor of Persian literature at Delhi University. His father was an economist.

Danish graduated from Delhi University with degrees in economics and management.

== Career ==
Husain's early career was in banking, but, dissatisfied, he turned to the performing arts when he was about 30 years old.

Husain joined Mahmood Farooqui (who began in 2005) to help revive Urdu storytelling, Dastangoi, and in 2016 developed Qissebaazi, multilingual storytelling. His theatre company in Mumbai is The Hoshruba Repertory.

He has performed in many feature films, including Dhobi Ghat (2010), Peepli Live (2010), Newton (2017), and Soorma (2018). He has also acted in televisions series, such as Taj Mahal 1989 (2020), Mai Hero Boll Raha Hu (2021) and Bard of Blood (2019).

== Personal life ==
Husain resides in Mumbai.

Advocacy and positions

In late 2012, Hussain (appearing in petition records under his formal name, Murtaza Danish Hussaini) Joined over 200 civil society signatories-including writers, filmmakers, and academics-in a clemency appeal addressed to President of India, Pranab Mukherjee. The petition appealed against the execution of 2008 Mumbai attacks convict Ajmal Kasab, advocating for his death penalty to be commuted to life imprisonment as part of principled opposition to capital punishment.

== Filmography ==
=== Films ===
| Year | Title | Role | Notes |
|---|---|---|---|
| 2010 | Peepli Live | Vijay Ranjan Prasad | |
| 2010 | Dhobi Ghat | Salim | |
| 2013 | Ankhon Dekhi | Gopi | |
| 2015 | Welcome 2 Karachi | Pakistani Minister | |
| 2017 | Newton | DIG of Police | |
| 2018 | Soorma | Kartar Singh | |
| 2019 | Baazaar | Dubey | |
| 2020 | Mee Raqsam | Salim | |
| 2020 | Jai Mummy Di | Gurpal Bhalla | |
| 2021 | Bansuri: The Flute | Albert Rozario | |
| 2022 | Dasvi | Rai Bareli | Film released on Netflix |
| 2022 | Ariyippu | Kailash | Film released on Netflix; Malayalam film |
| 2023 | Tiger 3 | General Riaz | |
| 2025 | Lucca's World | Doctor Kumar | |
| 2025 | The Sadist | News Anchor | |
| 2025 | Haq | Maulvi Basheer Anwer | |
| 2026 | Patriot | | Malayalam film |
| 2026 | Everybody Loves Sohrab Handa | Kumar | |

=== Web series ===
| Year | Title | Role | Notes |
|---|---|---|---|
| 2019 | Bard of Blood | Mullah Khalid | |
| 2019 | Taj Mahal 1989 | Sudhakar Mishra | |
| 2020 | Hostages | Arjun Bhasin | |
| 2021 | Bombay Begums | Naushad Irani | |
| 2022 | Tanaav | Shabbir Malik | |
| 2025 | Crime Beat | Amir Akhtar | |
