= Taj Mahal 1989 =

2020 Indian television series

- Genre: Comedy; Drama; Romance
- Written by: Pushpendra Nath Misra
- Directed by: Pushpendra Nath Misra
- Starring: Neeraj Kabi; Geetanjali Kulkarni; Danish Husain
- Theme music composer: Amar Mangrulkar
- Country of origin: India
- Original language: Hindi
- No. of seasons: 1
- No. of episodes: 7

Production
- Executive producers: Pushpendra Nath Misra, Sonali Bhatia, Kanchan Marathe
- Producer: Divyaa Iyer
- Cinematography: Will Humphris
- Editor: Pushpendra Nath Misra
- Running time: 33 minutes

Original release
- Network: Netflix
- Release: 14 February 2020

Taj Mahal 1989 is an Indian comedy drama romance television series directed and written by Pushpendra Nath Misra. The series stars Neeraj Kabi, Geetanjali Kulkarni, Sheeba Chaddha and Danish Husain. It is set in Lucknow in 1989 India and revolves around characters with different takes on love. It was released on Netflix on 14 February 2020.

== Plot ==
Lucknow, 1989. A pre-Internet age, where finding love was difficult, but sustaining it, even more so. Taj Mahal 1989 follows the intersecting lives of a Lucknow University professor couple, their students, a long-lost friend and his lover, and a schoolgirl in love with an older boy. Through the daily struggles and triumphs of the characters, the series explores the different shades of love across the ages as it mutates and matures.

== Episodes ==
=== Episode 1 ===
Lucknow University professors Sarita and Akhtar, are a married couple often in conflict. Rashmi and Dharam, the university power couple, are best friends with Angad, who doesn't believe in love. Dharam’s uncle, Sudhakar, despairs over him and Angad slacking off. Meanwhile, schoolgirl Sunaina is secretly dating Shalin, a young man from Bombay. Their lives begin to intersect as Akhtar runs into Sudhakar and his partner, Mumtaz, at a poetry symposium.

=== Episode 2 ===
Akhtar brings Sudhakar and Mumtaz home for dinner, which upsets Sarita. Rashmi, meanwhile, is miffed when Angad refuses to help her with the adaptation of a play, Hayavadana. Angad celebrates his birthday party at his friend, Shontu’s, farmhouse. He promises to help Shontu woo Mamta, the girl he likes, even as Rashmi continues to ignore Angad. Akhtar begrudgingly agrees to watch a film with Sarita, but brings Sudhakar along. The crack in Sarita-Akhtar's marriage begins to deepen.

=== Episode 3 ===
Sarita meets her friend, Prabha, and contemplates what it would be like to be a divorcée. Wanting power, Dharam joins Babbu Bhaiya, a local goon, who convinces him to contest the university elections from their party. Akhtar learns of Sarita’s decision to get divorced. Angry and hurt, he gets drunk at Sudhakar’s house, where Sudhakar reveals the truth behind his relationship with Mumtaz. Dharam's involvement in politics starts to damage his relationship with Rashmi.

=== Episode 4 ===
Shontu, with Angad's help, is able to impress Mamta. She nominates him as the presidential candidate from her Communist party for the university elections. When sparks fly between Angad and Mamta after they have a heated debate, Angad is forced to rethink his decision to help Shontu. Mumtaz gets into a public argument, and is humiliated; Sudhakar tries to comfort her. Meanwhile, the tension between Akhtar and Sarita reaches a boiling point, resulting in an explosive fight.

=== Episode 5 ===
Shontu is kidnapped, resulting in panic at the University. Over the days, Mamta steps up as presidential candidate, while Sarita and Akhtar decide to finalize their divorce after returning from a honeymoon in Agra. Seeing Mamta's rise in popularity, Dharam takes his goons along with him to threaten her into backing down. Sudhakar rushes to the hospital to meet an injured Mumtaz, and the two make a decision regarding their future.

=== Episode 6 ===
Dharam's obsession with power causes his relationships to fall apart, and even angers Babbu Bhaiya. Desperate to regain favour with him, Dharam agrees to help Sunaina run away with Shalin. Rashmi realizes she is in love with Angad and decides to confess. Sarita and Akhtar spend quality time in Agra, but the impending divorce still looms large. Meanwhile, Sudhakar and Mumtaz move to Barabanki to start over, but Mumtaz's past returns to haunt her.

=== Episode 7 ===
The lives of Akhtar and Sarita, Rashmi and Angad, Sunaina and Shalin, Mamta, and Dharam intersect in Agra. The Agra railway station witnesses a brawl, while the police station witnesses a showdown. Some couples come together, while others are torn apart. Life goes on, and love continues to be a mutating virus.

== Cast ==
The series features the following casts

- Neeraj Kabi as Akhtar Baig
- Geetanjali Kulkarni as Sarita
- Danish Husain as Sudhakar Mishra
- Sheeba Chaddha as Mumtaz
- Anud Singh Dhaka as Angad Trivedi
- Anshul Chauhan as Rashmi Malik
- Paras Priyadarshan as Dharam Awasthi
- Middat Khan as Budhai
- Shirin Sewani as Mamta Roy Choudhary
- Vasundhara Rajput as Sunaina
- Raj Singh as Babbu Bhaiya
- Varun Tamta as Jindal
- Ravi Kumar as Piyush
- Jashn Kohli as Shontu
- Yash Bhojwani as Deepu
- Mihir Ahuja as Shalin
- Oroon Das as Steve
- Priyank Srivastav as Sudhir
- Kavita Srivastava as Binita

== Soundtrack ==
Track listing
No.	Title	Lyrics	Music	Performer(s)	Length
1.	"Suniyo Kahiyo"	Pushpendra Nath Misra	Amar Mangrulkar	Sharmistha Chatterjee
2.	"Tum Jo Kabhi"	Pushpendra Nath Misra	Amar Mangrulkar	Kshitij Wagh
3.	"Har Su Tu Hai"	Pushpendra Nath Misra	Amar Mangrulkar	Tarun Srivastava
4.	"Saare Puraane Zakhm"	Pushpendra Nath Misra	Amar Mangrulkar	Narayan Parasuram
5.	"Love Doctor"	Amar Mangrulkar	Amar Mangrulkar	Amar Mangrulkar
6.	"Toofan"	Amar Mangrulkar	Amar Mangrulkar	Amar Mangrulkar, Zeenia Roy
7.	"Jaane Kya Dhoondu"	Pushpendra Nath Misra	Amar Mangrulkar	Zeenia Roy
8.	"Meri Nazar"	Pushpendra Nath Misra	Amar Mangrulkar	Smita Jain
9.	"Kehna Nahi Aata"	Pushpendra Nath Misra	Amar Mangrulkar	Amar Mangrulkar
10.	"Kya Karoon Fariyaad"	Pushpendra Nath Misra	Amar Mangrulkar	Amar Mangrulkar
11.	"Jahaan Sirf Tum Ho"	Pushpendra Nath Misra	Amar Mangrulkar	Zeenia Roy
12.	"Tum jo kabhi"	Pushpendra Nath Misra	Amar Mangrulkar	Kshitij Wagh
13.	"Lehenga pada mehenga"	Pushpendra Nath Misra	Amar Mangrulkar	Tripty Sinha

== Release ==
Taj Mahal 1989 was released on 14 February 2020 on Netflix.

== Reception ==
Karishma Upadhyay of Firstpost wrote in her review "Poetic writing, attention to detail make this Netflix Original rise above its low production value". Rohan Naahar from Hindustan Times praised the show by writing "Neeraj Kabi and Sheeba Chadha are excellent in this wistful and wise Netflix India original.". Roktim Rajpal wrote a positive review in Deccan Herald and said that Taj Mahal 1989 "is a simple and effective attempt at storytelling that satisfies the target audience.". In The News Minute Saraswati Datar wrote that the show is "an enjoyable must watch".
