= OK Computer (TV series) =

Indian Sci-Fi comedy series

- Official Poster
- Genre: Science fiction Philosophical fiction Absurdist fiction Comedy
- Created by: Pooja Shetty; Neil Pagedar
- Written by: Neil Pagedar; Pooja Shetty; Anand Gandhi
- Directed by: Pooja Shetty; Neil Pagedar
- Starring: Vijay Varma; Radhika Apte; Kani Kusruti; Jackie Shroff
- Composer: Gabriel Prokofiev
- Country of origin: India
- Original language: Hindi
- No. of seasons: 1
- No. of episodes: 6

Production
- Executive producers: Pooja Gupta; Nikhil Madhok; Avani Saxena; Zain Memon; Abhijit Ghatak
- Producers: Anand Gandhi; Pooja Shetty; Neil Pagedar
- Production location: India
- Cinematography: Diego Guijarro
- Editor: Charu Takkar
- Production company: Memesys Culture Lab

Original release
- Network: Disney+ Hotstar
- Release: 26 March 2021

OK Computer is an Indian absurdist science fiction comedy television series on Disney+ Hotstar created and directed by Pooja Shetty and Neil Pagedar, who co-wrote the script along with Anand Gandhi. Gandhi and his team also produced the series through the studio Memesys Culture Lab. The series stars Radhika Apte, Vijay Varma, Rasika Dugal, Jackie Shroff, Kani Kusruti, and Ullas Mohan and began streaming on Disney+ Hotstar from 26 March 2021.

The title is a reference to a line from the Douglas Adams' novel, The Hitchhiker's Guide to the Galaxy, with the phrase OK Computer being popularized by the English rock band Radiohead.

== Synopsis ==
Set in the year 2031, OK Computer takes place in a technologically advanced India featuring holographic infrastructure and drone-operated highways. When a self-driving taxi is hacked and used to kill a pedestrian, cybercrime detective Saajan Kundu is pulled out of retirement to investigate.

Reluctantly partnering with Laxmi Suri, an artificial intelligence specialist and his former colleague, Saajan traces the case to Goa. Their investigation leads them to Ajeeb, a government-funded humanoid robot with a seemingly benign disposition.

As the inquiry unfolds, the team confronts philosophical and legal dilemmas: Is Ajeeb capable of intent or violence? Can an artificial intelligence be held accountable if manipulated by another? Could a human be orchestrating events from behind the scenes? The series explores these questions while examining the ethical boundaries of AI and its role in future society.

== Cast ==
- Vijay Varma as Saajan Kundu
- Radhika Apte as Laxmi Suri
- Kani Kusruti as Monalisa Paul
- Ullas Mohan as Ajeeb
- Neil Pagedar as Ajeeb's voice
- Jackie Shroff as Pushpak Shakur
- Sarang Sathaye as Ashfaq Auliya
- Vibha Chibber as DCP DCP
- Ratnabali Bhattacharjee as Trisha Singh
- Rasika Dugal as Satoshi Mondal
- Alok Ulfat as Nigel Paudwal

== Production ==
Pooja Shetty, Neil Pagedar and Anand Gandhi worked extensively through its research for three years and the team spent seven years for the work, with four years on developing the script which is touted to be an "entire universe of sequels, prequels, gaming, feature film, animation script and episodic content with multiple seasons".

The team filmed most of the series by March 2020 before the COVID-19 pandemic lockdown was announced, and in April 2020, the team reported the primary cast members Radhika Apte and Vijay Varma first to the news. They also planned to enter post-production which was delayed due to lockdown restrictions. The team spent four months for post-production as it features heavy visual effects. By early February 2021, the team had completed the post-production works.

== Release ==
The series was showcased to the officials of Disney+ Hotstar who eventually agreed for its distribution rights. On 8 March 2021, the first poster of the series was unveiled through social media platforms, followed by the trailer on 10 March 2021. The series was unveiled on Disney+ Hotstar on 26 March 2021 in Hindi and was dubbed in Tamil, Telugu, Malayalam, Kannada, Bengali and Marathi languages.

== Accolades and awards ==
OK Computer was the first series to be screened at the Bright Future's section at the International Film Festival of Rotterdam 2021 and one of the only series to be screened in theatres at the New Zealand International Film Festival 2021.

Film Festivals and Awards
Award	Category	Recipients	Result
International Film Festival Rotterdam, 2021	Bright Future	Pooja Shetty, Neil Pagedar	Official entry
New Zealand International Film Festival, 2021	Main Competition	Pooja Shetty, Neil Pagedar	Official entry
Filmfare OTT Awards, 2021	Best Actor Male (Comedy)	Vijay Varma	Nominated
Filmfare OTT Awards, 2021	Best Supporting Actor Female (Comedy)	Kani Kusruti	Won
Filmfare OTT Awards, 2021	Best VFX	Imagery Pictures	Nominated

== Episodes ==
No.	Title	Directed by	Written by	Original release date
1	"Autopilot"	Pooja Shetty; Neil Pagedar	Pooja Shetty; Neil Pagedar; Anand Gandhi	26 March 2021
When a self-driving car kills a pedestrian, prickly Cyber Cell detective Saajan Kundu teams up with his estranged partner Laxmi Suri to investigate. But was this an accident?
2	"Making of a Messiah"	Pooja Shetty; Neil Pagedar	Pooja Shetty; Neil Pagedar; Anand Gandhi	26 March 2021
Cyber Cell reminisces Ajeeb the robot's meteoric rise as a saviour of humankind. However, when it's brought in as the chief murder suspect, it seems to be a bumbling shadow of its former self.
3	"Ctrl + Ajeeb + Del"	Pooja Shetty; Neil Pagedar	Pooja Shetty; Neil Pagedar; Anand Gandhi	26 March 2021
Cult leader Pushpak Shakur confesses to the murder, and the case comes to a sudden close. But when he wants to talk to Ajeeb in lieu of his cooperation, Saajan smells a rat.
4	"Save Progress"	Pooja Shetty; Neil Pagedar	Pooja Shetty; Neil Pagedar; Anand Gandhi	26 March 2021
The search for Satoshi takes Saajan and Ajeeb into a virtual-reality game built by bots in the dark web. Meanwhile, Laxmi visits ZIP only to discover something disturbing.
5	"The Robot Condition"	Pooja Shetty; Neil Pagedar	Pooja Shetty; Neil Pagedar; Anand Gandhi	26 March 2021
Saajan makes a breakthrough with the case. A surprising testimony from Laxmi seals the deal and secures a verdict in court, but the game might not be over just yet.
6	"Hello World"	Pooja Shetty; Neil Pagedar	Pooja Shetty; Neil Pagedar; Anand Gandhi	26 March 2021
Saajan and Laxmi learn that sorrows come not as singular mercenaries but as invading battalions. However, in a quiet corner of the city, truth is resurrected and finally revealed.

== Reception ==
Saibal Chatterjee of NDTV gave three out of five to the series, reviewing "OK Computer, made up of six episodes roughly 40 minutes each, is itself an extended cathartic joke. Persuasive and pulpy in the same sweep, it thrives on contradictory pulls. Sometimes uneven but always intriguing, it is programmed to blend piffle and tongue-in-cheek punditry in an unbridled flight of fancy." Nandini Ramanath of Scroll.in stated "OK Computer struggles in the wonderment department, but is perfectly at home tinkering with software and hardware and concluding that there is no better programme than human intelligence." Rohan Naahar of Hindustan Times stated "Besides adopting an absurdist tone that will alienate virtually all kinds of audiences, the new Hotstar series wastes its trump card Jackie Shroff." Ektaa Malik of The Indian Express gave three out of five stars stating "Even for those who like sci-fi, this Vijay Varma-Radhika Apte starrer would take some getting used to. But tide it out, as it is worth it." Pradeep Menon of Firstpost gave three out of five stating "Ok Computer is still immensely gripping, because you just never know what to expect. Some of the punchlines are so good yet so subtle, they’ll fly past you before you notice they were there. It also means that it is the kind of show that might be best appreciated with repeat viewings; because you’re absolutely missing a ton of stuff the first time around, so rapid are its mood swings."
