= The Sadist (2024 film) =

Indian short film

- Directed by: Kundan Shashiraj
- Written by: Kundan Shashiraj
- Produced by: SudhaNshu Kumar, Danish Husain, Vipin Sharma, Shishir Sharma
- Starring: Vipin Sharma, Danish Husain, Vineet Kumar, and Shishir Sharma
- Cinematography: Shashank Kumar Harsh
- Edited by: Sahil Tanveer
- Music by: Mannan Munjal
- Production companies: Dashmani Media Private Limited and Qissebaaz LLP
- Release date: October 2024
- Running time: 30 minutes
- Country: India
- Language: Hindi

The Sadist is a 2024 Indian short film written and directed by Kundan Shashiraj. The 30-minute film, categorized as a news and drama short, explores themes of societal shifts toward violence and the role of media manipulation in shaping collective morality. It features a cast including Danish Husain, Vipin Sharma, Shishir Sharma, and Vineet Kumar. The film was produced by Dashmani Media Private Limited, Qissebaaz LLP, Sudhanshu Kumar, and actor Vipin Sharma.

== Plot ==
The Sadist centers on a prime-time news anchor and examines how media narratives can influence societal attitudes, leading to the celebration of violence and cruelty. The story delves into the psychological transformation of individuals and society, posing questions about the impact of manipulative media tactics on collective morality.

== Cast ==
- Danish Husain
- Vipin Sharma
- Shishir Sharma
- Vineet Kumar

== Production ==
The film was written and directed by Kundan Shashiraj, with production handled by Dashmani Media Private Limited, Qissebaaz LLP, Sudhanshu Kumar, and actor Vipin Sharma. Specific details about the filming process, such as shooting locations or duration, have not been publicly disclosed.

== Themes ==
The film addresses the societal trend of normalizing violence and cruelty, focusing on the role of media in shaping public perception. It critiques how manipulative news narratives can alter collective morality, encouraging reflection on humanity's response to violent acts.
