= Nautanki Saala! =

2013 film by Rohan Sippy

- Directed by: Rohan Sippy
- Screenplay by: Charudutt Acharya; Rohan Sippy; Nipun Dharmadhikari
- Story by: Benoit Graffin; Pierre Salvadori
- Produced by: Bhushan Kumar; Krishan Kumar Dua; Ramesh Sippy; Roopa de Choudhury
- Starring: Ayushmann Khurrana; Pooja Salvi; Kunaal Roy Kapur; Evelyn Sharma; Gaelyn Mendonca
- Cinematography: Manoj Lobo; Sudhakar Reddy Yakkanti
- Edited by: Aarif Sheikh
- Music by: Songs: Falak Shabir; Mikey McCleary; Rashid Khan; Ayushmann Khurrana; Rochak Kohli; Anand–Milind; Ilaiyaraaja; Lakshmikant-Pyarelal; Background Score: Mikey McCleary
- Production companies: T-Series Films; Ramesh Sippy Entertainment
- Release date: 12 April 2013
- Country: India
- Language: Hindi
- Box office: ₹223 million (US$2.3 million)

Nautanki Saala! (transl. Dramatic scamp!) is a 2013 Indian Hindi-language romantic comedy-drama film directed by Rohan Sippy, starring Ayushmann Khurrana and Kunaal Roy Kapur along with Pooja Salvi, Evelyn Sharma and Gaelyn Mendonca. Abhishek Bachchan appears in a cameo role, continuing his association with the director. The story is based on the 2003 French comedy film Après Vous.

The film was produced by Ramesh Sippy, Bhushan Kumar, Krishan Kumar and Roopa de Choudhury under the banner of T-Series Films. in association with R.S. Entertainment. The first look of Nautanki Saala! was released on 2 October 2012. The movie was released on 12 April 2013. Upon release, Bhushan Kumar declared the movie a "winner in all the aspects."

== Plot ==
The story is about the friendship and bonding between RP and Mandar and how they face problems and solve them.

Ram Parmar, a.k.a. RP, is in a meeting with a psychiatrist for problems he's experiencing due to three breakups in the last three months. The film runs in a narrative mode. RP is a successful theater artist portraying the role of Raavan. One day, while returning home, he witnesses Mandar Lele attempting suicide. He saves him and brings him home. Mandar is devastated by his breakup with Nandini and attempts suicide because he thinks he is worthless. As Ram is a helping guy, he tries to solve Mandar's problems and probes into his life. He offers him the role of Lord Ram in his theater play. He finds Nandini and tries reuniting her with Mandar. While doing this, he lies many times to his close friend Sita and girlfriend Chitra. The latter ultimately breaks up with him. During this, Ram falls for Nandini, who reciprocates his feelings. Meanwhile, Mandar is coming back to normal. Ram feels he is cheating on his friend; he breaks off with Nandini and makes arrangements so that Nandini and Mandar meet. Unfortunately, all this is revealed to Mandar and Nandini. Ram ultimately loses his girlfriend, his love, and his friend.

Returning to the present day, the psychiatrist suggests RP to apologise to all three, which may suffice in resolving the problems. Mandar returns to RP's play in the role of Hanuman and unites Nandini with RP. After doing so, he lives with Sita.

== Cast ==
- Ayushmann Khurrana as Ram Parmar a.k.a. R.P.
- Kunaal Roy Kapur as Mandar Lele
- Pooja Salvi as Nandini Patel (voice dubbed by Urvi Ashar)
- Gaelyn Mendonca as Chitra Singh
- Sanjeev Bhatt as Chandra
- Evelyn Sharma as Sita
- Rufy Khan as Loki
- Sulabha Arya as Mandar's grandmother
- Purva Naresh as Ram's psychiatrist
- Abhishek Bachchan in a Special Appearance

== Production ==
=== Development ===
In early 2012, Bhushan Kumar and Rohan Sippy announced their first collaboration of working together to give out a romantic comedy film. Later in June 2012, Rohan and Bhushan Kumar announced that the lead actors of the movie to be Ayushmann Khurrana, in his second film after Vicky Donor and Kunaal Roy Kapur, who was last seen in Delhi Belly.

The leading ladies of the movie are Pooja Salvi, Evelyn Sharma and Gaelyn Mandonca. Nautanki Saala! became Gaelyn's and Pooja's debut, while Evelyn's fifth Bollywood film to release.

=== Filming ===
The shoot went on floors on 22 July 2012 and the movie was entirely shot in Mumbai with major part of the movie being night sequences. The first look and announcement of the movie was made in October 2012 by T-Series. Bhushan Kumar wanted a longer campaign of eight weeks for promotion. The first promo of Nautanki Saala! was attached with Special 26.

== Soundtrack ==
Nautanki Saala!

Soundtrack album by Falak Shabir Ayushmann Khurrana Rochak Kohli Anand–Milind Ilaiyaraaja Mikey McCleary Laxmikant-Pyarelal Rashid Khan
- Released: 25 February 2013
- Recorded: 2013
- Genre: Film soundtrack
- Length: 50:28
- Language: Hindi
- Label: T-Series
- Producer: Bhushan Kumar

The soundtrack for the film is composed by Falak Shabir, Ayushmann Khurana, Rochak Kohli, Mikey McCleary, and Rashid Khan, with Anand–Milind and Laxmikant–Pyarelal being credited for the recreations of "Dhak Dhak" and "So Gaya Yeh Jahan" from Beta and Tezaab, respectively.

Post Khurana's successful singing debut in Vicky Donor, Bhushan Kumar and Rohan Sippy decided on making Khurana sing in this movie as well. Ayushmann has sung two songs, Saadi Galli Aaja and Tu Hi Tu, in the movie.

Track-List
No.	Title	Lyrics	Music	Singer(s)	Length
1.	"Mera Mann Kehne Laga"	Falak Shabir	Falak Shabir	Falak Shabir	3:46
2.	"Saadi Galli Aaja"	Ayushmann Khurrana, Rochak Kohli, Gurpreet Saini	Ayushmann Khurrana, Rochak Kohli	Ayushmann Khurrana, Neeti Mohan	4:14
3.	"Dhak Dhak"	Sameer	Anand–Milind, Ilaiyaraaja, Mikey McCleary	Saba Azad, Geet Sagar, Bruno Carvalo, Santosh Sawant	3:39
4.	"Tu Hi Tu"	Kausar Munir	Mikey McCleary	Ayushmann Khurrana	3:59
5.	"Draamebaaz"	Kausar Munir	Mikey McCleary	Geet Sagar	3:24
6.	"Sapna Mera Toota"	Kausar Munir	Rashid Khan	Rahat Fateh Ali Khan, Hashim Sabri, Aftab	5:52
7.	"Dil Ki Toh Lag Gayi"	Kausar Munir	Mikey McCleary	Saba Azad	4:11
8.	"So Gaya Yeh Jahan"	Javed Akhtar	Laxmikant–Pyarelal, Mikey McCleary	Nitin Mukesh	3:46
9.	"Mera Mann Kehne Laga" (Reprise)	Falak Shabir	Falak Shabir, Abhijit Vaghani	Falak Shabir	4:20
10.	"Saadi Galli Aaja" (Unplugged)	Ayushmann Khurana, Gurpreet Saini	Ayushmann Khurrana, Mikey Mcleary	Ayushmann Khurrana	3:22
11.	"Mera Mann Kehne Laga" (Female)	Falak Shabir	Falak Shabir	Tulsi Kumar	4:24
12.	"Saadi Galli Aaja" (Remix)	Ayushmann Khurrana, Rochak Kohli, Gurpreet Saini	Ayushmann Khurrana, Rochak Kohli	Ayushmann Khurrana, Neeti Mohan	3:26
13.	"Mera Mann Kehne Laga" (Remix)	Falak Shabir	Falak Shabir	Falak Shabir	4:39
Total length:					50:28

== Release ==
=== Critical reception ===
The film received generally mixed reviews. Sukanya Verma for Rediff.com wrote that the plot of Nautanki Saala! "seems better-suited for a sitcom episode." Anupama Chopra on Hindustan Times gave it a rating of 2 and a half saying "Nautanki Saala! has all the ingredients of a peppy, amiable comedy but this soufflé doesn't quite rise."

Professional ratings
Review scores
Source	Rating
Rediff.com	2.5/5 stars
Hindustan Times	2.5/5 stars

== Box office ==
Nautanki Saala! opened slowly while picked up at evening especially at multiplexes on day one and collected around ₹30 million (US$310,000) nett. The film raked ₹113 million (US$1.2 million) over its first weekend. During its first week, the movie grossed around ₹165 million (US$1.7 million).
