= Geetanjali Kulkarni =

Indian actress

- Born: Mumbai, Maharashtra, India
- Education: National School of Drama
- Occupation: Actor
- Years active: 2014–present
- Known for: Gullak
- Spouse: Atul Kulkarni (m. 1996)

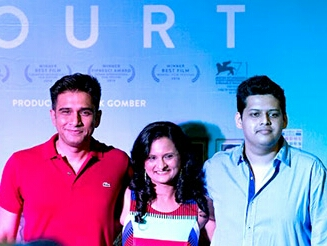
Vivek Gomber, Chaitanya Tamhane, and Geetanjali Kulkarni at the trailer launch of Court.

Geetanjali Kulkarni (born Geetanjali Moreshwar Sherikar) is an Indian actress who works in Marathi Cinema and in Hindi cinema. She has received several awards including two Filmfare Awards Marathi and three Filmfare OTT Awards. She has starred in many plays, most notably a rollicking rendition of Twelfth Night in Hindi, called Piya Behrupiya.

== Accolades ==
Year	Award	Category	Work	Result	Ref
2015	Filmfare Awards Marathi 2015	Critics Award Best Actress	Court	Won	
2021	2021 Filmfare OTT Awards	Best Actress (Comedy Series)	Gullak	Won	
2021	2021 Filmfare Marathi Awards	Best Supporting Actress	Karkhanisanchi Waari	Won	
2022	2022 Filmfare OTT Awards	Best actress (Comedy Series)	Gullak	Won	
2024	2024 Filmfare OTT Awards	Best Actress in a (Comedy Series)	Gullak season 4	Won	

== Filmography ==
Year	Series	Role	Notes
2004	Aga Bai Arrecha!	Ranga's colleague	Marathi film
2014	Ragini MMS 2	Witch / Ghost	Hindi film
2014	Court	Public Prosecutor Nutan	Filmfare Critics Award for Best Actress – Marathi
2015	P Se PM Tak	Anandibai	
2016	Hotel Salvation	Lata	
2018	Selection Day	Geeta	TV series
2018	Sir	Laxmi	
2019	Photograph	Rampyaari	
2019	Anandi Gopal	Vimaltai	
2019	Bombay Rose	Flower Seller	Voice over
2019-24	Gullak	Shanti Mishra	SonyLIV
2020	Vegali Vaat	Deshmukh Madam	
2020	Taj Mahal 1989	Sarita Baig	Netflix
2020	Operation MBBS	Dean Sadhana Sharma	Web-series
2021	Karkhanisanchi Waari	Sadhana Karkhanis	
2021–Present	Aarya	Sushila Shekhar	
2022	Unpaused: Naya Safar	Sangeeta Waghmare	Anthology film
2022	Humble Politician Nograj	Ms. Dalal	
2022	Cobalt Blue	Sharada Dixit	
2022	Minimum	Rukhsana	
2022	Rangbaaz Darr Ki Rajneeti	Ahilya Devi	
2025	Mu. Po. Bombilwaadi	Varvante Kaku	
2025	Khauf	Constable Ilu Mishra	
2026	Maa Behen	Mrs. Gupta	
