= Rohena Gera =

Indian screenwriter and film director

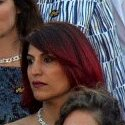
- Rohena Gera at the 2018 Cannes Film Festival
- Born: 1973 (age 52–53); India
- Education: Stanford University, Sarah Lawrence College
- Occupations: Director, screenwriter, producer
- Notable work: What's Love Got to Do with It? (2013); Sir (2018)
- Spouse: Rohan Sippy (div. 2003)
- Relatives: Ramesh Sippy (father-in-law)

Rohena Gera, born in 1973, is an Indian director, screenwriter and producer.

== Biography ==
Rohena Gera studied at Stanford University and Sarah Lawrence College. She works as a scriptwriter for Indian cinema. She also engages in non-profit campaigns to defend peace and equality.

Gera was married to Rohan Sippy, who also went to Stanford and is now a screenwriter. They got divorced in 2003.

== Works ==
In 2003, Rohena Gera made her screenwriting debut for the first season of the Indian comedy-drama television series Jassi Jaissi Koi Nahin on Sony Entertainment Television.

In 2003 she independently produced the public service advertisements featuring 16 celebrities including Zakir Hussain, Amitabh Bachchan, Sachin Tendulkar, Aamir Khan, Ashutosh Gowariker, and M.F. Husain, all coming together to say "Stop the hatred" and to fight hate propaganda after the Gujarat riots.

In 2013, Rohena Gera wrote and directed her first documentary What's Love Got to Do with It? The film shows a funny representation of urban and privileged Indians who reconcile with expectations about love, marriage, happiness and tradition. The story mixes the stories of eight unlikely candidates who are each in line for an arranged marriage, playing with the rules that often reinforce the status quo of class, caste and gender. The director takes an intimate look at the human quest for love and happiness, capturing social obligations or pressures within the Indian family. The documentary is selected at the Mumbai Film Festival.

Rohena Gera presented her film Sir (Monsieur) during the Cannes Film Festival 2018, in the selection of La Semaine de la Critique. The story is about a servant, Ratna who is working in the luxurious house of Ashwin and dreams of independence. Ratna and Ashwin fall in love but Ratna breaks the relationship foreseeing it unacceptable to the society. Two opposing worlds will have to live together. The film is supported by the Gan Foundation for Cinema, whose Broadcast Award supports the first works of young filmmakers.

== Filmography ==
=== Director ===
- 2013 : What's Love Got to Do with It ?
- 2018 : Sir

=== Writer ===
- Jassi Jaissi Koi Nahin (season 1)
- Kuch Naa Kaho (2003)
- Thoda Pyaar Thoda Magic (2008)
- What's Love Got to Do with It ? (2013)
- Sir (2018)

== Awards ==
- Cannes film festival, Semaine de la critique, Gan foundation award, SIR (Monsieur)
- Grand Jury award, International film festival of Saint Jean de Luz (execo), SIR (Monsieur)
- Audience favourite award, International film festival of Saint Jean de Luz, SIR (Monsieur)
- Best film, New York Indian Film Festival, SIR
- Best actress, New York Indian Film Festival, Tillotama Shome (SIR)
- Mill Valley Film Festival, California, Audience Favorite Gold (World cinema independent), Sir
- Birmingham Indian Film Festival (UK), Audience Favourite Award (Sir)
- Braunschweig Film Festival (Germany): Audience Choice Award SIR (Die Schneiderin der Traume)
- World Cinema Amsterdam Festival, Audience Choice Award, SIR
- Cabourg Film Festival (France), Audience Choice Award SIR (Monsieur)
- Best Film, Dallas Fort Worth South Asian Film Festival, SIR
- Best Director, Dallas Fort Worth South Asian Film Festival, Rohena Gera (Sir)
- Best Actor, Dallas Fort Worth South Asian Film Festival, Vivek Gomber (Sir)
- Brussels International Film Festival, Best Actress, Tillotama Shome (Sir)
- Festival Version Originale (France): Audience Favourite Award SIR (Monsieur)
- Festival du Cinéma de la FOA (France): Audience Favourite Award SIR (Monsieur)
- Filmfare award for Best Screenplay (India)
- Filmfare award for Best Actress, Critics Choice (India) for Tillotama Shome
