= Jameel Khan =

Indian actor

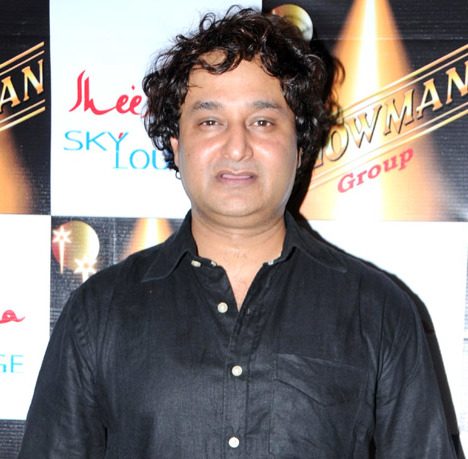
- Khan in 2013
- Born: 26 November 1974 (age 51); Bhadohi, Uttar Pradesh, India
- Occupation: Actor
- Years active: 1999–present
- Known for: Gangs of Wasseypur; Gullak

Jameel Khan is an Indian actor known for his TV series Gullak for which he won two Filmfare O.T.T Awards in category of Best Actor in a Comedy Series. He is also widely known for his roles in several other independent film productions.

== Early life and career ==
Born in Bhadohi, Uttar Pradesh, Khan was educated at Sherwood College, Nainital and Aligarh Muslim University. He moved to Mumbai to pursue his acting career, and has acted in films such as Asambhav, Gangs of Wasseypur, Goliyon Ki Rasleela Ram-Leela and Baby. He also acted in Beneath the Sea of Lights starring Academy Award Nominee Barkhad Abdi and Jim Sarbh.

He attained further recognition for his role in TVF's Gullak as Santosh Mishra, and received the award for Best Actor (Comedy Series) twice, in 2021 and 2022, for the same.

== Filmography ==
Key
†	Denotes films that have not yet been released

=== Films ===
Year	Title	Role	Notes
1999	Hum Dil De Chuke Sanam	Nimesh	
2003	Chalte Chalte	Traffic Policeman	
2004	Asambhav	Atul Bhatnagar	
2007	Loins of Punjab Presents	Mr. Bokade	
2007	Cheeni Kum		
2008	Rock On!!	Tolani	
2010	Badmaash Company	Archie	
2010	24 Hrs	Salim	
2011	Jo Dooba So Paar: It's Love in Bihar!	Gangster	
2012	Gangs of Wasseypur	Asghar Khan	
2012	Oass	Baadu	
2013	Goliyon Ki Rasleela Ram Leela	Vanka	
2015	Guddu ki Gun	Marwadi Don	
2015	All Is Well	Police Officer	
2015	Bloody Moustache	Sundar	Short Film
2015	Baby	Taufiq	
2015	Phantom	Wedding Singer	
2017	Tiger Zinda Hai		
2017	Theeran Adhigaram Ondru	Police Informer	
2017	Firangi	Hakeem	
2018	Phamous	Amay	
2019	Setters		
2019	Blank		
2019	Pagalpanti	Panditji	
2019	The Desert Son		Short film
2020	Das Capital- Gulamon ki Rajdhani	BDO Officer	
2020	Beneath A Sea Of Lights	Vinay	
2021	Pagglait	Ghanshyam	
2021	14 Phere	Amay	
2023	Mission Raniganj	Pasu	
2023	Safed	Guru Maa	
2023	Ganapath	Kaizad	
2024	Srikanth	A. P. J. Abdul Kalam	

=== Television ===
Year	Title	Role	Notes
1998	CID (Indian TV series)	Dev	Episodes 19-20
2001-2002	Parsai Kehate Hain		Based on the stories by prolific Hindi Writer Shri Harishankar Parsai
2019 – present	Gullak	Santosh Mishra	5 seasons on Sony Liv
2025	Bada Naam Karenge	Lalit Gupta	SonyLIV
2025	Mandala Murders	Jimmy Khan	Netflix
2026	Taskaree	Suresh Kaka	Netflix series

== Accolades ==
Year	Award	Category	Work	Result
2013	Screen Awards	Best Actor in a Supporting Role	Gangs of Wasseypur	Nominated
2021	2021 Filmfare OTT Awards	Best Actor (Comedy Series)	Gullak	Won
2022	2022 Filmfare OTT Awards	Best Actor (Comedy Series)	Gullak	Won
