= Sir (2018 film) =

2018 Hindi-language romance drama film

SIR
- Promotional poster
- Directed by: Rohena Gera
- Screenplay by: Rohena Gera
- Produced by: Rohena Gera; Brice Poisson
- Starring: Tillotama Shome; Vivek Gomber
- Cinematography: Dominique Colin
- Edited by: Jacques Comets; Baptiste Ribrault
- Music by: Ragav Vagav
- Production company: Platoon One Films
- Distributed by: PVR Pictures
- Release dates: 14 May 2018 (Cannes); 20 September 2018 (Netherlands); 13 November 2020 (India)
- Running time: 100 minutes
- Countries: France; India
- Language: Hindi
- Box office: US$1.3 million

Is Love Enough? - Sir is a 2018 Indian Hindi-language romantic drama film directed by Rohena Gera. The film stars Tillotama Shome and Vivek Gomber and was produced by Rohena Gera and Brice Poisson. Sir had an initial release at the Cannes Film Festival followed by theatrical release in European countries in 2018. The film was theatrically released in India on 13 November 2020.

== Plot ==
Ratna is an on premise maid employed by Ashwin and his girlfriend, Sabina.

Ashwin has recently returned to Mumbai from New York, leaving behind his dream to be a writer, after learning his brother is not well. He stays back to support his family emotionally when his brother dies. Ratna is an independent person with self-respect. However, as a widow from a small village her prospects are extremely limited. She is working in Mumbai to be self-sufficient and also financially helps her family, and encourages her sister to study. It was her dream to study which she could not fulfill because of marriage and now she wants her sister to get educated. She also nurtures a dream to become a fashion designer.

The movie opens with Ratna being called back for work as Ashwin has left his to-be wife, Sabina on their wedding day and has come back home. From the conversations with his friends and family we learn that Sabina had cheated on him and he wasn't really in love with her. He stays low spirited for days until Ratna, not able to see him unhappy, narrates her story of losing her husband after just 4 months when she was 19 years old but now she is an independent woman who is supporting her family. She says "life never stops", implying we should move on with our life whatever may come. She stays back to work at his house, defying the possibility of gaining a bad reputation for living with a man alone.

We gradually learn that Ashwin is a nice person who does not care about class differences and respects Ratna like any other person in his life. He speaks up for her when an acquaintance of his scolds Ratna for accidentally spilling a drink on her. Over time Ashwin learns about Ratna's dream to become a fashion designer when Ratna asks Ashwin's permission to go to tailoring classes and expresses her wish to become a fashion designer. Ashwin initially thinks light of her desire, but immediately corrects himself and apologises to Ratna, saying 'everyone has the right to dream'. Ratna empathises with Ashwin as he is stuck in Mumbai for his family, and is not able to follow his dream to write. They sync emotionally.

Ratna gifts Ashwin a handmade shirt for his birthday. He wears the shirt to work that same day, agreeing to Ratna's request not to tell anyone she made it for him. Meanwhile, Ratna learns that her sister is getting ready for marriage before completing her diploma. She is disappointed to know her sister is more enthusiastic to come to Mumbai than to complete her studies. But Ashwin consoles her by saying that the groom might be a good person, who wants his wife to be independent. He gives her some money as a gift for her sister's wedding even though she resists. He calls her when she is away for the wedding to check in with her. The attention makes her uncomfortable, and emotionally confused.

Upon her return to work for Ashwin, the dynamic changes between them. Ashwin becomes enamoured with Ratna. He also gives Ratna a sewing machine as a gift. Soon after, on the day of Ganesh Chaturthi, Ashwin returns home to find a carefree Ratna dancing with a crowd of people celebrating the festival. After a silent but charged elevator ride up to his apartment, Ashwin expresses his feelings. Ratna allows Ashwin's advances for a moment while they share a kiss, then strongly expresses her will against any possible relationship. When Ashwin asks her to go out with him, she takes him to the building rooftop where they share some thoughts and have a conversation. Ashwin discourages her from calling him 'sir' while Ratna asks him to forget about their encounter that night. When Ashwin's friend learns of his feelings, he discourages him from being in a relationship with a maid and reminds him of the social repercussions of such a relationship. He says that for Ratna's sake, he should not act on his feelings. The next day, Ratna, as the maid, is asked to cook for a party at Ashwin's mother's place. Ashwin unintentionally makes Ratna uncomfortable by asking if he should wait for her to go back home, provoking mockery from other household employees.

When they return to Ashwin's apartment, Ratna makes it clear that they cannot be in a relationship as she will not be welcome among his family and friends, and vice-versa, and that if her family came to know of their relationship, she would be forced to return to a restrictive village life. When he insists on being together, she decides to quit her job and leaves, despite Ashwin's request that he might help her in any way even if she no longer wants to be in the house. She tells him not to worry for her or contact her. Ratna moves to her sister's house, while Ashwin tells his father that he is in love with Ratna and will be moving back to New York. After some time, we see Ratna getting hired by Ashwin's friend who is a fashion designer, through Ashwin's recommendation. Ratna rushes off to Ashwin's house to see him but finds the door bolted and the flat vacant. Dejected, she goes to the rooftop, where she unexpectedly receives a call from Ashwin. Finally, understanding his insistence on seeing her as an equal, she reconciles with her identity crisis and responds to his call by addressing him by his first name "Ashwin". This also indicates that despite social differences, there can be love.

== Cast ==
- Tillotama Shome as Ratna
- Vivek Gomber as Ashwin
- Divya Seth as Ashwin's mother
- Dilnaz Irani as Nandita (Ashwin's sister)
- Anupriya Goenka as Ankita
- Rashi Mal as Sabina
- Bachan Pachera as Tailor Mastar
- Geetanjali Kulkarni as Laxmi
- Ahmareen Anjum as Devika
- Rahul Vohra as Haresh, Ashwin's father
- Saharsh Kumar Shukla as Sabina's Driver

== Soundtrack ==
Sir

Soundtrack album by Ragav Vagav
- Released: 13 November 2020
- Recorded: 2018
- Genre: Feature film soundtrack
- Length: 6:05
- Language: Hindi
- Label: Zee Music Company

Official audio
- Sir - Full Album on YouTube

The film's music was composed by Ragav Vagav; the lyrics were written by Mohit Chauhan.

Track listing
No.	Title	Singer(s)	Length
1.	"Jeene Mein Kya Jaata Hai"	Suvarna Tiwari	3:01
2.	"Zindagi Ka Feel"	Nakash Aziz	3:04
Total length:			6:05

== Reception ==
=== Critical response ===
On the review aggregator website Rotten Tomatoes, 86% of 22 critics' reviews are positive, with an average rating of 6.8/10. The website's consensus reads: "As it paints its humanistic portrait of Indian society, Sir crafts a delicately told love story with dazzling imagery and an irresistibly optimistic spirit."

Baradwaj Rangan of Film Companion gave the film 4 out of 5, writing, "Sir is a simple film, but deceptively so. It is an accumulation of small moments that build gradually." Jordan Mintzer of The Hollywood Reporter gave a positive review, calling the film "a modest yet effective tale of love and class."

Coversely, Gaspar Zimerman of Clarín gave the film a negative review, writing, "The director Rohena Gera manages to draw attention to characteristics of Indian society, opening the door to a medieval world in which the caste system still seems to have a decisive weight, the lower class seems slave to the upper class and, in rural areas, machismo is law. Too bad she doesn't get them to work in favor of the narrative."

=== Accolades ===
Award (Note: Awards, festivals and organizations are in alphabetical order.)	Date of ceremony (Note: Date is linked to the article about the awards held that year, wherever possible.)	Category	Recipient(s)	Result	Ref.
Cannes Film Festival	8–19 May 2018	Critics' Week Grand Prize	Rohena Gera	Nominated	
Cannes Film Festival	8–19 May 2018	Gan Foundation Award	Rohena Gera	Won	
Filmfare Awards	27 March 2021	Best Film (Critics)	Rohena Gera	Nominated	
Filmfare Awards	27 March 2021	Best Story	Rohena Gera	Nominated	
Filmfare Awards	27 March 2021	Best Screenplay	Rohena Gera	Won	
Filmfare Awards	27 March 2021	Best Actress (Critics)	Tillotama Shome	Won	
Filmfare Awards	27 March 2021	Best Editing	Jacques Comets and Baptiste Ribrault	Nominated	
