= Pooja Salvi =

Indian film actress and model

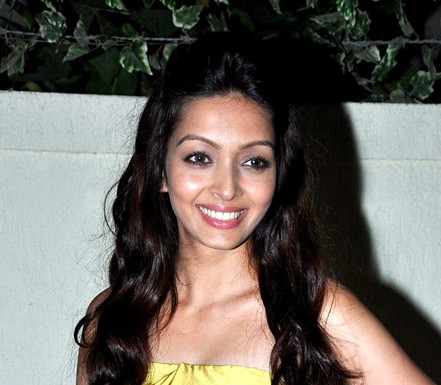
- Pooja Salvi in 2018
- Occupations: Actress and model
- Years active: 2013–present
- Notable work: Nautanki Saala!

Pooja Salvi is an Indian actress and model. In 2013, Pooja made her Bollywood debut in Rohan Sippy's romantic comedy Nautanki Saala!.

== Career ==
Pooja Salvi modeled for LUX along with Aishwarya Rai Bachchan in a commercial which was directed by Rohan Sippy. She then appeared in commercials for brands like Cadbury, Tata Sky and Francis Alukkas.

== Filmography ==
Year	Film	Role	Co-artist(s)	Notes
2013	Nautanki Saala	Nandini Patel	Ayushmann Khurrana	
