= 785 Records =

785 Records is a record label located in New York, United States, founded in 2005 by songwriter Denise Rich. The label's first release was the charity single Come Together Now, written by Rich, Sharon Stone, Mark Feist and Damon Sharpe from which the proceeds went to benefit the victims of Hurricane Katrina.

Marc Eichner, a senior executive at RCA/BMG, joined the label as president in August 2006. The label built a $1 million recording studio in Rich's Fifth Avenue penthouse in Manhattan overlooking Central Park in 2007.

== Bands/Artists under the label ==
- Article A
- Tiffany Giardina
- At First Blush!

== See also ==
- Record Label
- List of record labels

List of record labels
A–H	I–Q	R–Z	0–9
