= Stalking Gia =

American singer

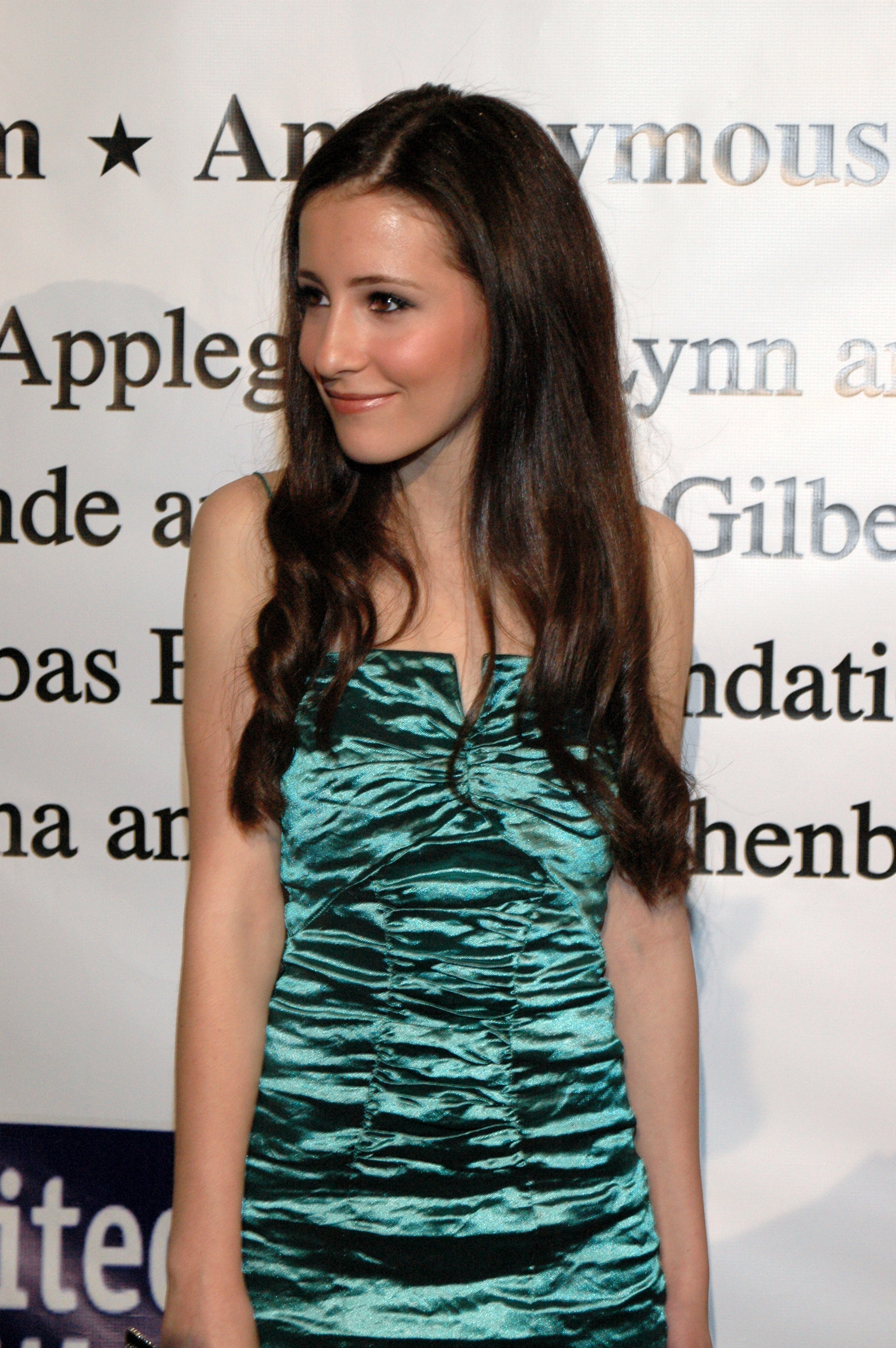
- Gia in 2009

Background information
- Also known as: Tiffany Gia
- Born: Tiffany Kathryn Giardina; November 4, 1993 (age 32); New York City, U.S.
- Genres: Electropop; indie pop; pop rock (early)
- Occupation: Singer
- Years active: 1999–present
- Labels: Epic (2020–); 785 (2005–2010)
- Website: www.stalkinggia.com

Tiffany Kathryn Giardina (born November 4, 1993), known by her stage name Stalking Gia, is an American singer from New York. She has been a recording artist since 2005, and performing under the stage name Stalking Gia since 2014. In 2020, she signed to Epic Records, releasing the single "The Kindest Thing" in April. Her newest single "Worship" was released on February 12, 2021, as part of an ongoing EP, Season 1.

== Early life and career ==
Born Tiffany Kathryn Giardina, Gia was raised Waccabuc, New York. She started on Broadway at the age of five and performed as Molly in Annie as well as roles in Peter Pan and The Sound of Music. She was featured in television commercials for Cheerios and Major League Baseball. She also appeared in comedy sketches on Saturday Night Live and the Late Show with David Letterman. In 2006, she took part in the "62nd Annual Columbus Day Parade" in New York City.

At age 13, in 2005, Gia was signed by 785 Records. She released her debut studio album, No Average Angel, in 2009. The singles "No Average Angel" and "Hurry Up and Save Me" from the album were then featured on the soundtrack for the film, Another Cinderella Story. Giardina's song, "Shine", was also featured on the soundtrack for Disney's Tinker Bell. She also performed as the singing voice for the character of Keira in the 2012 animated film, Barbie: The Princess & the Popstar.

== Stalking Gia ==
In 2014, she changed her stage name to Stalking Gia, taking her longstanding World of Warcraft persona as her new artist name. She said, "Being an artist is basically saying, 'Hey world, feel free to stalk me.'" At the same time, she began releasing music independently. In 2020, she signed to Epic Records and released the single "The Kindest Thing" in April of that year. She is due to release an EP entitled Season 1 later in 2020, but has been since been pushed back to sometime in 2021.

== Discography ==
=== Albums ===
List of studio albums with selected details
Title	Details	Peak chart positions	
Title	Details	US Heat	US Indie
We've Got Christmas	Released: November 8, 2005; Label: 785 Records; Formats: Digital download, CD	—	—
No Average Angel	Released: January 20, 2009; Label: 785 Records; Formats: Digital download, CD	8	34
"—" denotes a title that did not chart, or was not released in that territory.

=== Extended plays ===
Title	Details
Paper Made Hearts	Release date: September 7, 2010; Label: 785 Records; Formats: Digital download
PTSD	Release date: November 23, 2018; Label: Self-released; Formats: Digital download
Season 1	Release date: 2021; Label: Epic; Formats: Digital download

=== Singles ===
Year	Title	Album
2005	"Sure Don't Feel Like Christmas"	We've Got Christmas
2006	"Dream Away"	Non-album single
2008	"Hurry Up and Save Me"	No Average Angel
2008	"No Average Angel"	No Average Angel
2010	"Life is a Fairytale"	Barbie: A Fashion Fairytale
2010	"I'm Not Crazy"	Non-album single
2014	"War Paint"	Non-album single
2016	"Second Nature"	Non-album single
2016	"Young Diana"	Non-album single
2017	"Siren"	Non-album single
2018	"PTSD"	PTSD
2018	"Miracles"	PTSD
2020	"The Kindest Thing"	Season 1
2021	"Worship"	Season 1

==== As featured artist ====
Title	Year	Album
"Purple Brick Road" (Raekwon ft. Stalking Gia & G-Eazy)	2017	The Wild

=== Other appearances ===
Title	Year	Album
"Hurry Up and Save Me"	2008	Another Cinderella Story
"No Average Angel"	2008	Another Cinderella Story
"Shine"	2008	Tinker Bell
"Shut Up & Dance" (Show Me The Skyline ft. Tiffany Giardina)	2011	Perfect for Me
"Here I Am / Princesses Just Wanna Have Fun" (with Jennifer Waris)	2012	Barbie: The Princess & the Popstar
"I Wish I Had Her Life" (with Jennifer Waris)	2012	Barbie: The Princess & the Popstar
"To Be a Princess / To Be a Popstar" (with Jennifer Waris)	2012	Barbie: The Princess & the Popstar
"Perfect Day" (with Jennifer Waris)	2012	Barbie: The Princess & the Popstar
"Look How High I Can Fly"	2012	Barbie: The Princess & the Popstar
"Princess & Popstar Finale Medley" (with Jennifer Waris)	2012	Barbie: The Princess & the Popstar
"Here I Am (Keira Version)"	2012	Barbie: The Princess & the Popstar
"Talking to Myself" (Soysauce ft. Stalking Gia)	2015	Lunch Money – EP
"Without a Trace" (Kill the Noise ft. Stalking Gia)	2015	OCCULT CLASSIC
"wish u the best" (blackbear ft. Stalking Gia)	2017	digital druglord
