= Apurva Asrani =

Indian filmmaker

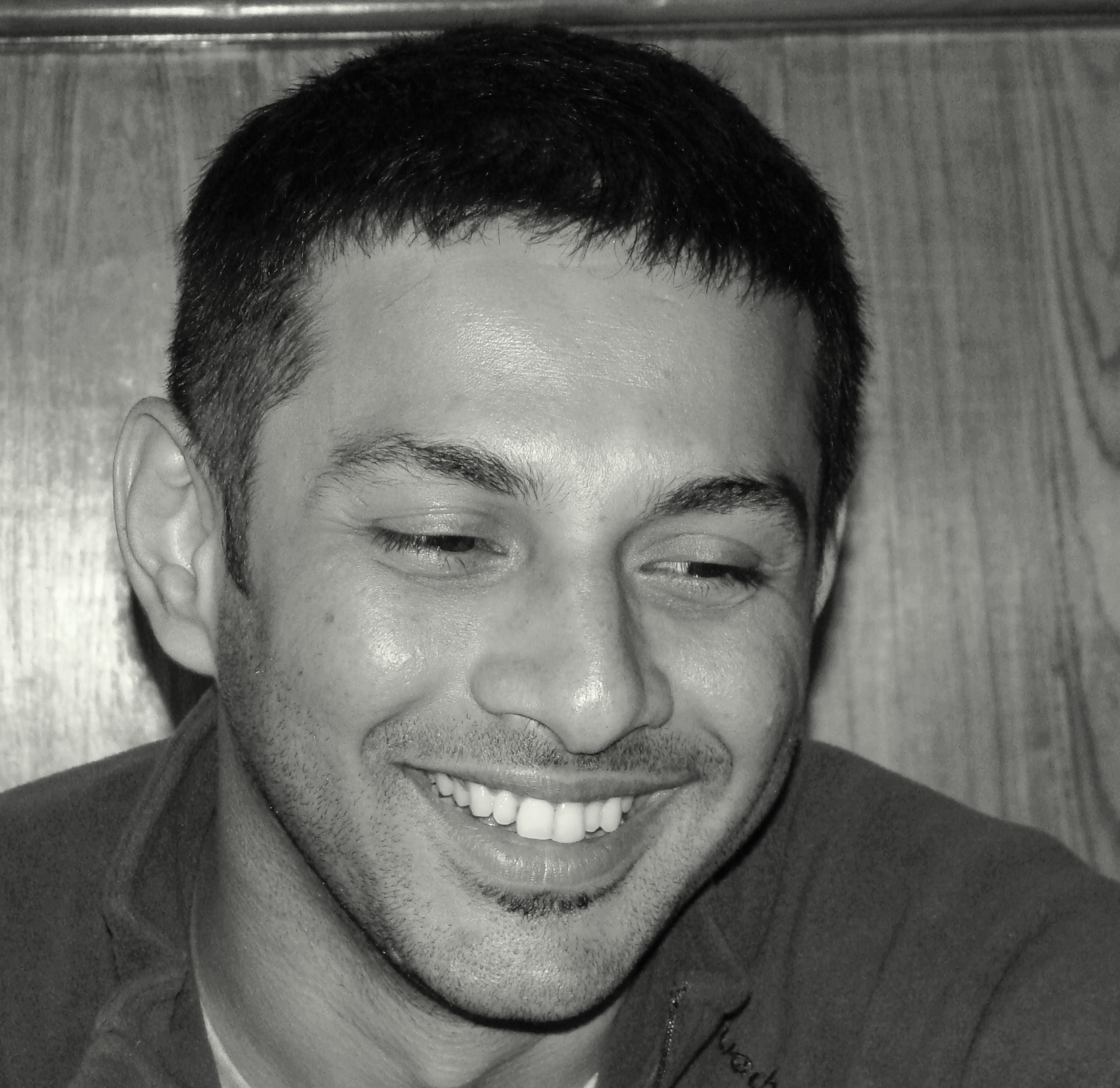
- Born: Apurva M Asrani; 21 March 1978 (age 48)
- Occupations: Film editor; screenwriter; director
- Years active: 1995–present

Apurva Asrani (born 21 March 1978) is an Indian filmmaker. He has written the human rights drama Aligarh (2016), the courtroom drama Criminal Justice: Behind Closed Doors (2020), has co-written and edited the film Shahid (2013), has edited the gangster film Satya (1998) and also the webseries Made in Heaven (2019).

He also the director of the Tera Mera Pyar (2005) music videos for Sony Music India.

Apurva made his webseries writing debut with the 2021 Disney Hotstar show Criminal Justice: Behind Closed Doors. The show starring Pankaj Tripathi, Kirti Kulhari, Anupriya Goenka & Dipti Naval received glowing reviews and garnered record viewership for Disney Hotstar.

In August 2021, Criminal Justice: Behind Closed Doors became the first Indian series to win 'Best Drama Series' in South Asia at the Content Asia Awards in Singapore. Apurva was subsequently nominated for a Filmfare Award for 'Best Adapted Screenplay' and for a Critics Choice Award by the Film Critics Guild for 'Best Writing'.

== Career ==
=== Satya and early career ===
Apurva began his career in 1995 as an assistant on the popular Bollywood countdown show Bpl Oye! on Channel [V]. At 19 he became a film editor on the film Satya, directed by Ram Gopal Varma. His frenetic narrative device was celebrated by critics and audiences alike and he went on to win the Filmfare Award for Best Editor for it. He was also the youngest ever recipient of that award. He then went on to edit Sunhil Sippy's bilingual comedy Snip (film).

Apurva's other work includes the gang war film Chhal directed by Hansal Mehta. Critic Subhash K Jha wrote in his review 'The real hero of Chhal is Apurva Asrani's editing'. Apurva edited Anupam Kher's directorial debut Om Jai Jagadish and also collaborated with Nagesh Kukunoor on his Akshay Kumar starrer Tasveer 8x10 as supervising editor and as film editor on Aashayein, starring John Abraham.

In 2005, Apurva directed the music videos of Sony Music India's album Tera Mera Pyar and launched actress Nimrat Kaur in it. The title track, "Tera Mera Pyar", was sung by Kumar Sanu; "Yeh Kya Hua" was sung by Shreya Ghosal and composed by UK-based artists Partners in Rhyme. Tera Mera Pyar won album of the year at the Sahara Music Awards in San Francisco.

In March 2006, Apurva represented India in Editing Fashion, a multimedia experiment for UK-based showstudio.com. Apurva's short film Imperfect Moon was showcased along with the films of Oscar nominated British director, Mike Figgis and Wong Kar Wai's editor William Chang.

On the UK stage, Apurva has collaborated with a British theatre company RIFCO Arts to write dialogue for three successful UK touring productions: Bollywood: Yet Another Love Story (2000/2003), The Deranged Marriage (2006) and There’s Something About Simmy (2007).

He is the editor and additional screenplay writer of the film Shahid and is also the writer and editor of the internationally acclaimed Aligarh.

=== Shahid ===
Apurva edited Hansal Mehta's Shahid (2012) that was produced by Siddharth Roy Kapur & UTV. The film is based on the true story of slain lawyer Shahid Azmi who fought several pro-bono cases in India. Shahid world-premiered at the Toronto International Film Festival on 9 September 2012 and went on to win the 'Silver Prize' at the Mumbai International Film Festival (MAMI). Director Hansal Mehta had this to say about Apurva's contribution to the film – 'Apurva, besides editing the film also shaped the narrative into a seamless, linear progression for which I have credited him for screenplay. If the film communicates a compelling story a lot of credit for it goes to Apu'.

=== CityLights, Children of War, Waiting ===
In 2014, Apurva edited Fox Star Studios & Vishesh Films CityLights starring Rajkummar Rao & Manav Kaul. The film received glowing reviews from leading critics.

Rahul Desai in his Mumbai Mirror review of Citylights said: Mehta and writer-editor Asrani pull off a rare feat here. They not only choose the right film to adapt—based solely on its theme and universal topicality—but build upon the original, without being overambitious.

In the same year, Apurva also edited Mrityunjay Devvrat's Children of War (formerly titled 'The Bastard Child'), a stark portrayal of the Bangladesh genocide of 1971. The film ran for a record-breaking 12 weeks in Bangladesh and is the only foreign produced film in history to have won a Bangladeshi National Award.

In 2015, Apurva edited Viacom 18's 'Dharam Sankat Mein', an adaptation of the British hit The Infidel.

In 2016, Apurva co-edited Waiting produced by Manish Mundra, directed by Anu Menon. The film starring Naseeruddin Shah & Kalki Koechlin received extremely positive reviews.

=== Aligarh ===
In 2016, Apurva made his debut as a full-fledged screenwriter by writing the screenplay and dialogues of Aligarh a human rights biopic.

The film premiered at the Busan International Film Festival and UK premiered at the BFI London Film Festival. It was the first Indian film to open Jio MAMI (Mumbai International Film Festival) in 16 years.

The film was among the best reviewed films of the year. Shubhra Gupta in her Indian Express review of the film wrote 'Like in 'Shahid', Hansal Mehta and scriptwriter Apurva Asrani have come up with a lead character and a film which shines with authenticity and emotional heft, and which leaves you thinking.'

Anupama Chopra in her Hindustan Times review of the film wrote 'Hansal and writer Apurva Asrani have mined from real events but their dramatisation of Siras' tragedy isn't shrill or militant.' Stutee Ghosh in her review in The Quint wrote 'Aligarh is an assiduously made piece of brilliance.'

Apurva was also the editor of the film.

=== Simran ===
In 2017, Apurva wrote the screenplay & dialogues of Simran. The film told the story of a desi girl in the US who turns into a bungling bank robber, and had actress Kangana Ranaut playing the titular role. But before its release itself, Simran made news for a controversy regarding sharing of writing credits between Kangana & Apurva.

Uday Bhatia in his Livemint review of the film said 'Having watched Simran I can understand why they’d squabble over the writing credits (officially, Apurva is story, screenplay and dialogue; Kangana is additional story and dialogue). Praful is a fantastically etched character, all quirks and hard edges and nervous energy, like a '40s screwball comedienne crossed with Gena Rowlands.'

=== Made in Heaven ===
Apurva made his foray into the digital space by editing the drama-comedy series Made in Heaven by Zoya Akhtar and Reema Kagti. The show, which premiered on Amazon Prime on 8 March 2019, is a bitter-sweet behind-the-scenes look at the big fat Indian wedding and features a leading character who is gay. The show garnered superlative reviews from leading critics. Rahul Desai in his Film Companion review said 'there's something to be said about the monumental manner in which homosexuality is normalized, especially in the bedroom. I don't remember when sex or affection between two men, or in fact two humans in general, was last shot with such disarming sensitivity'.

Ankur Pathak in his Huffington Post review said 'After decades of suffering regressive soap-operas on Indian television, we finally have a show that inverts every trope we’ve seen on Indian TV and makes a powerful commentary about the vulgar exhibition of power and wealth and its intersection with gender and class to piece together an impeccably feminist masterpiece.' Raja Sen in his Livemint review called Made in Heaven 'possibly the best Indian web series so far'.

Apurva edited the first four episodes of the nine part series. The first two were directed by Zoya Akhtar and the other two were directed by show runner Nitya Mehra.

== Awards ==
Apurva shared the Filmfare Award for Best Editing with Bhanodaya for their edit of Satya at the Filmfare Awards held in 1999.

In 2001, Apurva won the National Film Award for Best Editing for Snip!, a bilingual comedy directed by Sunhil Sippy. The National Awards citation read, "For creating an evocative rhythm enhancing the pace of the narrative while aesthetically maintaining the unit of form and content."

He was also nominated for a Zee Cine Award for his edit of Hansal Mehta's Chhal (film) in 2001.

In 2013 Apurva won the Life Ok Screen Award for Best Screenplay for Shahid which he shared with director Hansal Mehta.

In 2017, Apurva was nominated for 'Best Editing' & 'Best Original Screenplay' for Aligarh at the South African International Film Festival, also known as the RapidLion Awards.

In 2019, Apurva was nominated in the 'Best Editing' category for Made in Heaven at the Critics Choice Awards by the Film Critics Guild.

For his work on Criminal Justice: Behind Closed Doors, Apurva was nominated for a Filmfare Award in 2021 and for a Critics Choice Award in 2022 in the 'Best Writing' category.

== Filmography ==
Year	Title	Role	Notes
1998	Satya	Film Editor	Filmfare Award for Best Editing
2000	Snip!	Film Editor	National Film Award for Best Editing
2001	Chhal	Film editor	Zee Cine Award for Best Editing (Nominated)
2002	Om Jai Jagadish	Film editor	
2003	Kyon? (film)	Film editor & Additional screenplay	
2003	Out of Control	Co-director	
2008	Mukhbiir	Film editor	
2009	8 x 10 Tasveer	Supervising editor	
2010	Aashayein	Film editor	
2012	Jalpari-The Desert Mermaid	Film editor	
2012	Shahid	Film Editor	Life Ok Screen Award for Best Screenplay (Won)
2014	Children of War	Film editor	
2014	CityLights	Film editor & Script advisor	
2015	Dharam Sankat Mein	Film editor	
2015	Waiting	Film editor	
2015	Aligarh	Story/Screenplay/Dialogue & Editing	Rapid Lion Awards 'Best Original Screenplay' & "Best Editing' (Nominated)
2017	Simran	Co-Writer	
2019	Made in Heaven	Series editor	Critics Guild Award for Best Editing (Nominated)
2020	Criminal Justice: Behind Closed Doors	Adapted Story, Screenplay, Dialogue	Filmfare Award for Best Screenplay (Nominated)
