= Criminal Justice: Behind Closed Doors =

Indian web series (2020)

- Promotional poster
- Genre: Crime; Legal drama Thriller
- Written by: Apurva Asrani
- Directed by: Rohan Sippy; Arjun Mukerjee
- Starring: Pankaj Tripathi; Jisshu Sengupta; Kirti Kulhari; Khushboo Atre; Anupriya Goenka; Mita Vashisht; Pankaj Saraswat
- Composer: Sameer Phaterpekar
- Country of origin: India
- Original language: Hindi
- No. of seasons: 1
- No. of episodes: 8

Production
- Executive producers: Siddharth Khaitan; Rajesh Chadha
- Producers: Sameer Nair; Deepak Segal
- Production location: India
- Running time: 41-60 minutes
- Production companies: BBC Studios India; Applause Entertainment

Original release
- Network: Hotstar
- Release: 24 December 2020

Related
- Criminal Justice (2019)

Criminal Justice: Behind Closed Doors is an Indian Hindi-language legal drama web series for Hotstar Specials written by Apurva Asrani and directed by Rohan Sippy and Arjun Mukerjee. The series stars Pankaj Tripathi, Kirti Kulhari, Jisshu Sengupta and Khushboo Atre, and was released through Disney+ Hotstar on 24 December 2020.

== Cast ==
- Pankaj Tripathi as Advocate Madhav Mishra
- Jisshu Sengupta as Advocate Bikram Chandra, Anuradha's husband
- Deepti Naval as Vijaya "Vijji" Chandra, Bikram's mother
- Kirti Kulhari as Anuradha "Anu" Verma Chandra, Bikram's wife
- Anupriya Goenka as Nikhat Hussain, Mandira's former assistant
- Mita Vashisht as Mandira Mathur, Corporate lawyer
- Ashish Vidyarthi as Dipen Prabhu, Public Prosecutor
- Ayaz Khan as Dr. Moksh Singhvi
- Shilpa Shukla as Ishani Nath
- Padma Damodaran as Justice Alka Sharma
- Vibhavari Deshpande as Mukta Tai
- Adrija Sinha as Rhea Chandra, Anuradha and Bikram's daughter
- Khushboo Atre as Ratna Mishra, Madhav's wife
- Nilofar Gheshwat as Pushpa
- Ajeet Singh Palawat as Sub-Inspector Harsh Pradhan; Gauri's husband
- Kalyanee Mulay as Asst. Sub-Inspector Gauri Pradhan; Harsh's wife
- Pankaj Saraswat as DCP Raghu Salian

== Episodes ==
No.	Title	Directed by	Written by	Original release date
1	"A Perfect Family"	Rohan Sippy	Apurva Asrani	24 December 2020
Bikram Chandra is a high profile lawyer in Mumbai. He is seen fighting a case for a family without many means. His wife Anuradha is at home, and is seen contemplating over her medication, before discarding it. She doesn't pick up Bikram's phone and goes to see Moksh, a reputed psychiatrist in town, who is also a family friend. Bikram calls Anu a number of times, but she does not pick up his calls. Later, she calls Bikram from a super market. Bikram meets Mandira after that and also recommends to give case to Nikhat, who was her assistant in the first season of Criminal Justice. Once home, Bikram checks Anu's phone and notes an unlisted number on her call list. After putting their daughter Rhea to bed, he joins Anu in bed. He tries to make love to her, but she is not in a mood. He asks her to get vaseline from downstairs, Anu picks up a knife, crawls into bed and stabs Bikram. She leaves the house as if in a daze after phoning a Hospital. Rhea is woken from her sleep and enters her parents' bedroom to find her father stabbed. She pulls the knife out of her father's side and calls her grandma. The police takes Rhea with them and arrests Anu from the Hospital. Anu confesses to stabbing Bikram. Knowing that no lawyer will defend someone who has attacked Bikram, DCP Salian calls Madhav Mishra, to find if he would be interested in this case. Madhav just married in Patna leaves his newly wed wife and takes a flight for Mumbai on his first night.
2	"Open and Shut"	Rohan Sippy	Apurva Asrani	24 December 2020
Harsh and Gauri Pradhan, husband and wife and SI's working together investigate the case. Harsh, Gauri and Madhav Mishra interview the Chandra house staff and discover new information. Harsh convinced that Anu is to solely blame manipulates her to confess to the murder without a lawyer present. He further manipulates Anu, promising her access to Rhea, if she affirms her confirmation in court. Despite Madhav's advice, Anu affirms her confirmation in court.
3	"A Reasonable Doubt"	Rohan Sippy	Apurva Asrani	24 December 2020
In jail, Anu meets Ishani who takes her under her wing. However Ishani later shows her true colours and starts misbehaving with Anu. Outside, Madhav convinces Nikhat to meet Anu and manages to pass on a message to Rhea, her daughter. Due to which Rhea demands to meet with Anu, which makes Anu really happy for the first time.
4	"Murder"	Rohan Sippy	Apurva Asrani	24 December 2020
Harsh is determined to record Rhea's statement before she meets Anu, by blackmailing the CWC in charge. Getting wind of this, Madhav stakes out Vijji’s house, where he is able to take pictures of people present in the house (prosecutor, Mandira, Harsh, Gauri) during the statement recording of Rhea as a prime witness. Using this, Madhav gets Nigam thrown out as prosecutor and Mandira looks for a new public prosecutor. Meanwhile, Vijji gets a call from the hospital that Bikram is awake and when they all reach to the hospital, Bikram takes his last breath.
5	"Broken Dreams"	Arjun Mukerjee	Apurva Asrani	24 December 2020
Seven months have passed, and Mandira and Vijji have engaged a new hotshot prosecutor, Prabhu who is quite confident in his capabilities to win the case and determine to prove Anu a murderer both in the eyes of the court and Public through media. In the meantime, Madhav and Nikhat delve into Anu's past, which sheds new light on Bikram. As both meets Anu's father who tells them he was always in contact of Bikram and who also paid bills during his surgery 2 years back, while also claiming to both the father and daughter individually that another one doesn't wish to see them, creating distances. Bikram also seem to cut Anu's all the links with the outside world, keeping her away from her close friends as well.
6	"The Truth is Born"	Arjun Mukerjee	Apurva Asrani	24 December 2020
Madhav and Nikhat's suspicions about Bikram mount when they record Rhea's statement, where they get to know that Bikram used Rhea to keep an eye on her mother, who she talks to and what she does on the pretext that Anu is depressed.. In the jail, A woman named Sudha befriends Anu, and following her son being taken away to an adoption house after six years in jail, Sudha commits suicide, urging Anu to get out before the same happens with her. At the same time, a DNA test due to request of Harsh, reveals a shocking new twist, that Anu's newborn child is not Bikram's, but her psychiatrist Moksh's. On one side Gauri and on the other side Nikhat and Madhav examine pictures taken on Bikram's camera of Anu's closet, underwear drawer and makeup on her dresser trying to figure out their purpose.
7	"The Trial Begins"	Arjun Mukerjee	Apurva Asrani	24 December 2020
The trial begins, and Prabhu paints Anu as a scheming villainess whereas Madhav slowly begins to reveal Bikram as a controlling husband who was mentally abusing his wife. Due to the vital nature of Rhea's testimony, Madhav shrewdly suggests that Nikhat should take the lead on the case. When Nikhat pushes Rhea on the stand, both Rhea and Anu crumble and Anu begins to reveal to her lawyers the hell her marital life was.
8	"Out in the Open"	Arjun Mukerjee	Apurva Asrani	24 December 2020
Gauri re-examines the CCTV showing Anu wandering on the street after stabbing Bikram. Finding a vital clue, Salian gives the footage to Madhav, who with the help of his wife, sees that Anu dumped a bottle of vaseline in the garbage. Rhea finally blurts out the truth about her dad. Anu reveals that Bikram had total control on her life and anally raped her as a form of punishment. Initially thinking of committing suicide, a pregnant Anu decided to stab Bikram instead. The court finds Anu guilty of culpable homicide and sentences her to 2 years including time served which effectively sentences her to a year in prison. Vijji and Rhea show up at the prison to take Anu's baby home. Gauri finds that she is pregnant but decides that she does not want to be with Harsh. Madhav takes his wife on a long delayed honeymoon.

== Production ==
=== Development ===
On 12 February 2020, Sameer Nair, CEO of Aditya Birla Group's content studio Applause Entertainment and BBC Studios India, announced for the sequel of Criminal Justice, which will be adapted from the second season of the 2008 British original series. Sameer Gogate, business head of production at BBC Studios India said "The success of season one has shown what good content can achieve, and we hope the second season will be equally loved by the audiences." While Pankaj Tripathi, Anupriya Goenka and Mita Vashisht were reported to reprise their roles from the first season, the makers did not reveal about the new cast and crew, including the director.

In April 2020, the makers announced that Kirti Kulhari will appear in the new season, with Apurva Asrani roped in as the screenwriter and Rohan Sippy and Arjun Mukherjee were roped in to helm the series. On 3 December 2020, the makers announced the new title as Criminal Justice: Behind Closed Doors.

=== Filming ===
Principal shooting of the series took place in March 2020, but was immediately stopped due to the COVID-19 pandemic lockdown in India. The shoot was resumed in July 2020, with the makers following the safety guidelines imposed by the government in order to curb COVID-19 spread. The entire season is shot at three locations spanning over 60-70 working days. Shooting of the series was completed in September 2020.

== Release ==
The series was initially scheduled for a release in November 2020, before being postponed to December. On 8 December 2020, the makers unveiled character posters of the series, with the trailer being unveiled on 10 December 2020. The series released on Disney+ Hotstar on 24 December 2020 in Hindi, Tamil, Telugu, Malayalam, Kannada, Bengali and Marathi languages.

== Reception ==
Ektaa Malik, writing for The Indian Express gave three out of five and said, "Criminal Justice: Behind Closed Doors is a gripping morality tale, that is not to be missed". Divyanshi Sharma of India Today, gave three-and-a-half out of five and stated, "Criminal Justice is an important show, if not the most perfect one. And with every episode ending at a point where you want to know what happens next, it comes across as a successful thriller. The show ends on a bittersweet note, reminding us that no matter how much it rains, the sun will always shine." Saibal Chatterjee of NDTV gave three-and-a-half out of five and said, "As a legal drama, Criminal Justice S2 is pretty close to being top-notch. But it is its sharp-eyed exploration of women seeking equality in life and at work that elevates the series to a higher plane". Tatsam Mukherjee from Firstpost stated "Criminal Justice: Behind Closed Doors flirts with the notorious brand of 'realistic' that traverses the line of exploitative and vulgar." Nandini Ramnath from Scroll.in wrote " Kirti Kulhari’s heartrending performance is especially laudable considering her frustrating passiveness for the part. By reserving Anu’s transformation until the very end, the series reveals how hard it is for women to publicly admit to violence."

== Sequel ==
Further information: Criminal Justice: Adhura Sach

The third installment was released on 26 August 2022 with Pankaj Tripathi and Shweta Basu Prasad in the lead roles. Pankaj Tripathi and Khushboo Atre would be reprising their roles from previous 2 seasons, whereas Purab Kohli, Swastika Mukherjee, Adinath Kothare, Kalyanee Mulay, Aaditya Gupta, Deshna Dugad and Aatm Prakash Mishra are new addition to the cast.
