= Barbie: The Princess & the Popstar =

2012 animated film by Zeke Norton

Barbie: The Princess & The Popstar
- DVD cover
- Directed by: Zeke Norton
- Written by: Steve Granat; Cydne Clark
- Based on: The Prince and the Pauper by Mark Twain Barbie as the Princess and the Pauper
- Produced by: Shelley Dvi-Vardhana; Shawn McCorkindale
- Starring: Kelly Sheridan; Ashleigh Ball; Lauren Lavoie; Allison Warnyca; Ellie King; Leala Selina; Ashlyn Drummond; Christopher Gaze; Adrian Petriw; Peter Kelamis
- Edited by: Treg Brown
- Music by: Rebecca Kneubuhl; Gabriel Mann
- Production companies: Rainmaker Entertainment; Barbie Entertainment
- Distributed by: Universal Studios Home Entertainment
- Release date: September 11, 2012
- Running time: 75 minutes
- Countries: United States; Canada
- Language: English

Barbie: The Princess & The Popstar is a 2012 CGI-animated musical fantasy film produced by Rainmaker Entertainment and released by Universal Studios Home Entertainment. It is the twenty-third installment in the Barbie film series and the second to be based on Mark Twain's 1881 novel The Prince and the Pauper (after Barbie as the Princess and the Pauper).

Featuring the voices of Kelly Sheridan, Jennifer Waris, Ashleigh Ball, Tiffany Giardina, Ellie King and Peter Kelamis, the plot follows two teenage girls, Keira, a world-famous popstar, and Tori, princess of Meribella (both portrayed by Barbie) who meet and discover they both have the magic to swap places. It was released to DVD on September 11, 2012, and made its television debut on Nickelodeon on November 16, 2012.

== Plot ==
The kingdom of Meribella celebrates its 500th anniversary. Famous popstar Keira is giving a series of concerts to commemorate the event; behind the scenes, she is overwhelmed, between being unable to write new songs and dealing with her overeager manager, Seymour Crider. Meanwhile, the fun-loving Princess Tori is pressured by her domineering aunt, Duchess Amelia, and her royal responsibilities. Both girls wish they could trade lives with the other and take it easy.

At a royal reception, Keira and Tori meet each other and become fast friends. Using Keira's magic microphone that allows her to change outfits, and Tori's magic hairbrush that allows her to change hairstyles, the girls convincingly disguise themselves as each other, but their necklaces stay the same. Tori shows Keira the royal family's secret magic gardenia plant which grows diamond-encrusted flowers. The girls take two small diamonds from the plant and attach them to their necklaces. Crider finds out about the diamond gardenia and plans to steal it.

Using the magic microphone and hairbrush, the girls plan to switch places for a day and educate one another on their respective lives and routines. While Keira struggles with Tori's royal duties, playing with Tori's little sisters inspires her to write music again. Meanwhile, Tori is having fun rehearsing as Keira, but when freely exploring the kingdom, she discovers how badly the ongoing drought has affected the people. The girls decide to extend the switch for another day and make Keira's final concert a free one so more people can afford to attend.

The following night, when the girls are supposed to switch back, Keira is locked in the Princess's bedroom by the Duchess because of a commemorative speech Tori has been procrastinating. Though hesitant at first, Tori is forced to go onstage as Keira and manages to perform. Keira escapes Tori's bedroom through a secret passageway.

While the rest of the royal family is at the concert, Crider and his assistant Rupert sneak into the castle to steal the diamond gardenia. They uproot the gardenia, causing the rest of the kingdom's plants to wilt. Tori notices this and rushes back to the castle, where she and Keira change back and intercept Crider. Crider attempts to escape with the plant in a wingsuit, but the girls stop him by using the microphone and hairbrush to change his outfit; however, in the process, Crider drops the gardenia into the sea.

Using the diamonds from their necklaces, the girls plant them in the garden, where they instantly grow into a new diamond gardenia and magically revitalize the kingdom's plant life. The girls rush back to the concert where Keira and Tori perform a spectacular finale together; while sometime later, Tori is shown giving her speech, promising to use her voice to help the kingdom's less fortunate.

== Cast ==
- Kelly Sheridan (speaking) and Jennifer Waris (singing) as Princess Victoria "Tori" Bethany Evangeline Renee (played by Barbie), the fun-loving princess of Meribella, who dreams of becoming a popstar like Keira, and often shirks her royal duties to play with her younger sisters.
- Ashleigh Ball (speaking) and Tiffany Giardina (singing) as Keira (also played by Barbie), a famous popstar who dreams of being a princess, and is overwhelmed by her workload.
- Ellie King as Duchess Amelia, Tori's strict and domineering aunt.
- Peter Kelamis as Seymour Crider, a bitter former child soprano and Keira's manager.
- Jo Frost as Rupert, Crider's bumbling assistant.
- Allison Warnyca as Nora, Keira's organizer.
- Christopher Gaze as King Frederick, Tori's father and the king of Meribella.
- Lauren Lavoie as Princess Meredith, Tori's younger sister.
- Ashlyn Drummond as Princess Trevi, Tori's youngest sister.
- Adrian Petriw as Prince Liam, the prince of "Stuffinsburg" who was visiting Meribella. He falls for Keira when she is disguised as Tori.
- Leala Selina as Vanessa Victoria Fluffypie, Tori's snooty King Charles Cavalier Spaniel.
- Adrian Petriw as Riff, Keira's playful bulldog.

== Music ==
Barbie: The Princess and The Popstar (Soundtrack)

Soundtrack album by Jennifer Waris and Tiffany Giardina
- Released: August 28, 2012
- Recorded: 2012
- Genres: Pop rock, teen pop, country pop, dance-pop
- Label: Mattel, Inc.

A soundtrack album was released on August 28, 2012. Available on iTunes, it contains nine tracks, all featured in the film.

No.	Title	Writer(s)	Length
1.	"Here I Am / Princesses Just Want to Have Fun" (Tiffany Giardina and Jennifer Waris)	Amy Powers, Gabriel Mann, Rob Hudnut and Robert Hazard	3:34
2.	"I Wish I Had Her Life" (Giardina and Waris)	Powers, Mann and Hudnut	2:30
3.	"To Be a Princess / To Be a Popstar" (Giardina and Waris)	Powers, Mann and Hudnut	3:19
4.	"Perfect Day" (Giardina and Waris)	Tim James and Antonina Armato	3:29
5.	"Look How High We Can Fly" (Giardina)	Powers, Mann and Hudnut	3:08
6.	"Here I Am (Tori Version)" (Waris)	Powers, Mann and Hudnut	3:34
7.	"Princess & Popstar Finale Medley" (Giardina and Waris)	Powers, Mann, Hudnut, James and Armato	3:22
8.	"Princesses Just Want to Have Fun" (Waris)	Hazard	1:29
9.	"Here I Am (Keira Version)" (Giardina)	Powers, Mann and Hudnut	2:57

=== Here I Am ===
"Here I Am (Keira Version)"

Promotional single by Tiffany Giardina

from the album Barbie: The Princess and The Popstar (Soundtrack)
- Released: August 28, 2012
- Genre: Pop rock
- Length: 2:57
- Label: Mattel, Inc.
- Songwriters: Amy Powers, Gabriel Mann and Rob Hudnut

"Here I Am (Keira Version)" is a song recorded by American singer Tiffany Giardina for the 2012 CGI-animated movie Barbie: The Princess and The Popstar. It was released on iTunes on August 28, 2012 as a promotional single from the album. This is the second song that is featured in the film's credits.

== See also ==
- List of Barbie films
