= Gullak =

Indian web series by The Viral Fever

- Promotional poster
- Genre: Drama; Comedy
- Created by: Shreyansh Pandey
- Developed by: Shreyansh Pandey
- Written by: Nikhil Vijay (S1); Durgesh Singh (S2)
- Directed by: Amrit Raj Gupta (S1); Kamal nath jha(S2&3); Shreyansh Pandey(S4)
- Starring: Jameel Khan; Geetanjali Kulkarni; Vaibhav Raj Gupta; Harsh Mayar; Helly Shah; Anant Joshi
- Narrated by: Shivankit Singh Parihar
- Composers: Anurag Saikia; Simran Hora
- Country of origin: India
- Original language: Hindi
- No. of seasons: 5
- No. of episodes: 27

Production
- Executive producer: Sameer Saxena
- Producer: Arunabh Kumar
- Cinematography: Shree Namjoshi(S 1); lalit yadav(laliya films)(S 2)
- Editors: Amit Kulkarni(S 1); Gourav Gopal Jha(S 2)
- Running time: 19–46 minutes
- Production company: The Viral Fever Media Labs

Original release
- Network: TVFPlay; SonyLIV
- Release: 27 June 2019
- Network: SonyLIV
- Release: 15 January 2021 – present

Gullak (transl. Piggy Bank) is an Indian web series created by Shreyansh Pandey for the streaming service SonyLIV under the banner of The Viral Fever (TVF). The series revolves around the Mishra family, comprising Santosh and Shanti Mishra and their sons Anand "Annu" Mishra and Aman Mishra and features Jameel Khan, Geetanjali Kulkarni, Vaibhav Raj Gupta (seasons 1-4), Anant Joshi (season 5), and Harsh Mayar in the respective mentioned lead roles, with Sunita Rajwar as their neighbour.

The first season premiered on the TVF's streaming platform TVF Play and on Sony Liv, on 27 June 2019, with all episodes aired on the same day. The show received positive response from audience.

The program was renewed for a second season with mostly new crew members. Palash Vaswani directed the series, Durgesh Singh was the primary writer and Anurag Saikia and Simran Hora composed the soundtrack. The second season aired through Sony Liv on 15 January 2021, and unlike the first season, it received mixed reviews from critics. The series was then renewed for third season.

The trailer of Gullak Season 3 was released in March 2022 and received positive response from the audience. The third season was released on 7 April 2022 on SonyLIV.

The series was renewed for a fifth season, which premiered on 5 June 2026. and ended on 19 June 2026.

== Cast ==
| Character | Portrayed by | Appearances | | | |
| Character | Portrayed by | Season 1 | Season 2 | Season 3 | Season 4 |
|---|---|---|---|---|---|
| Santosh Mishra (Papa) | Jameel Khan | Main | Main | Main | Main |
| Shanti Mishra (Mummy) | Geetanjali Kulkarni | Main | Main | Main | Main |
| Anand Mishra (Annu) | Vaibhav Raj Gupta / Anant Joshi | Main | Main | Main | Main |
| Aman Mishra | Harsh Mayar | Main | Main | Main | Main |
| Dr. Preeti Singh | Helly Shah | | | | Recurring |
| Gullak/Narrator | Shivankit Singh Parihar | Recurring | Recurring | Recurring | Recurring |
| Bittu ki Mummy | Sunita Rajwar | Recurring | Recurring | Recurring | Recurring |
| Tyagi Ji | Deepak Kumar Mishra | | Recurring | Recurring | Recurring |
| Lucky | Saad Bilgrami | | Recurring | Recurring | Recurring |

== Episodes ==
=== Series overview ===
| Season | No. of episodes | Originally broadcast (India) | |
| Season | No. of episodes | First aired | Last aired |
|---|---|---|---|
| 1 | 5 | 27 June 2019 | |
| 2 | 5 | 15 January 2021 | |
| 3 | 5 | 7 April 2022 | |
| 4 | 5 | 7 June 2024 | |
| 5 | 7 | 5 June 2026 | 19 June 2026 |

=== Season 1 ===
| No. | Title | Directed by | Written by | Original release date |
|---|---|---|---|---|
| 1 | "Tehri" | Amrit Raj Gupta | Nikhil Vijay | 27 June 2019 |
Anand "Annu" Mishra is constantly in a tiff with his mother, Shanti, who fusses about his joblessness and services examination results.
| 2 | "Hum Do Humare Do" | Amrit Raj Gupta | Nikhil Vijay | 27 June 2019 |
Annu and his younger brother Aman start fighting due to the volume of the television. Aman urges Shanti to convince Annu to draw the chart for his board practical exam, which eventually starts another argument.
| 3 | "Itwaar" | Amrit Raj Gupta | Nikhil Vijay | 27 June 2019 |
Early on a Sunday morning, Shanti wakes up as her husband Santosh's alarm rings. It is a Sunday and most middle class families try to make it a special day. How would the Mishra family make this Sunday special?
| 4 | "Batti Aa Gayi" | Amrit Raj Gupta | Nikhil Vijay | 27 June 2019 |
Aman enquires about Annu who hasn't returned home late, while Santosh is quite relaxed and also waiting for him. Annu returns home only to demand a scooty, making excuses for being late.
| 5 | "Tyohaar" | Amrit Raj Gupta | Nikhil Vijay | 27 June 2019 |
It is Raksha Bandhan for which Shanti being sick yet has to work for whole day. Annu's exam results have been declared; he shares news of his failure with Aman, so he suggests him to run away due to the poor grades. Shanti falls unconscious when she hears the results, but she and Santosh pardon him after she regains consciousness.

=== Season 2 ===
| No. | Title | Directed by | Written by | Original release date |
|---|---|---|---|---|
| 1 | "Bijli Ka Bill" | Palash Vaswani | Durgesh Singh | 15 January 2021 |
Santosh is worried about the extraneous electricity bill and tries to get an illegal electricity supply for himself. However, he contemplates not doing so.
| 2 | "Cheeni Kam Paani Jyada" | Palash Vaswani | Durgesh Singh | 15 January 2021 |
Ahead of a kitty party, Shanti discovers that she is diabetic. Santosh eggs her on for physical exercise, while taking up the reins of the kitty party preparation in his hands, aided by Annu and Aman.
| 3 | "Saparivaar" | Palash Vaswani | Durgesh Singh | 15 January 2021 |
Santosh is miffed to notice that he has been excluded from a wedding card for Shanti's niece Ranu's wedding. Ranu's father Pinky has long been at loggerheads with him, and his reaction causes a change in everyone else's wedding plans.
| 4 | "Kal Board Ka Paper Hai" | Mohsin Khan | Durgesh Singh | 15 January 2021 |
Aman feels distracted by an India-Pakistan cricket match ahead of his board examinations. This results in a controversial moment where Annu is shamefaced on seeing Aman at a venue for a live telecast of the match.
| 5 | "Kiraana" | Palash Vaswani | Durgesh Singh | 15 January 2021 |
Annu is interrupted by Shanti and coaxed to buy groceries with Aman despite being late for a meeting where he would be able to work in a gas agency with help from the local leader Prinsu Bhaiya and his personal assistant Tyagi. Aman, too, is scared about his exam results.

=== Season 3 ===
| No. | Title | Directed by | Written by | Original release date |
|---|---|---|---|---|
| 1 | "Mission Admission" | Palash Vaswani | Durgesh Singh | 7 April 2022 |
The Mishra family has gotten older, wiser, and more at ease. When Annu's dreams and wants collide, he recognises that some ambitions must be put on hold for the family.
| 2 | "LTA" | Palash Vaswani | Durgesh Singh | 7 April 2022 |
Santosh Mishra, like every other middle-class family, returns home and wishes to utilise the much-awaited LTA.
| 3 | "Agua" | Palash Vaswani | Durgesh Singh | 7 April 2022 |
Santosh Mishra, as a young man, was an expert at arranging marriages. As an ex-Agua, he is urged to arrange a marriage for a young girl.
| 4 | "Satyanarayan Vrat Katha" | Mohsin Khan | Durgesh Singh | 7 April 2022 |
Sometimes, things don’t happen as planned and the Mishra family takes it upon themselves to change their kismat.
| 5 | "Izzat Ki Chamkaar" | Palash Vaswani | Durgesh Singh | 7 April 2022 |
The Mishra Parivar faces a health scare. Some members come to profound realisations, change their previously held beliefs, and mature.

=== Season 4 ===
| No. | Title | Directed by | Original release date |
|---|---|---|---|
| 1 | "'Kaaran Batau' Notice" | Shreyansh Pandey | 7 June 2024 |
Annu faces a demanding new boss, while the Mishra family battles corruption, navigating the treacherous path between integrity and desperation in their struggle to save their home.
| 2 | "Chinaiti" | Shreyansh Pandey | 7 June 2024 |
Shanti Mishra's trip to the temple turns tragic when a chain snatching incident traumatises her. Annu, Aman and Santosh have differing opinions regarding the incident.
| 3 | "Ghar Ka Kabaad" | Shreyansh Pandey | 7 June 2024 |
The Mishra family embarks on clearing out the clutter from their home. The arrival of the scrap dealer in Mishra Nivas creates amusing challenges for the family that's divided on what to sell and what to retain.
| 4 | "Teesra Pahiya" | Shreyansh Pandey | 7 June 2024 |
Annu faces challenges at work while Aman prepares to be the third wheel on Surya Narayan's date with a girl. Meanwhile, Santosh and Shanti are concerned about Aman's behaviour changing for the worse.
| 5 | "Pita, Putra aur Prempatra" | Shreyansh Pandey | 7 June 2024 |
Annu navigates work pressures, while Aman's rebellion leads to a family conflict.

== Reception ==
The series gained critical acclaim for its emotional and nostalgic elements.

Archika Khurana of The Times Of India said, "The beauty of the series lies in its narrative, which is as promising as its prequels and easy to relate to."

The show was said to be, "An old-world charm of the modern Indian nuclear family." by Troy Ribeiro of IANS.

RJ Divya Solgama gave the series a 4/5 saying, "'The Most Lovable Family On OTT Are Back With Thrice Amount Of Love & Cuteness."

Desi Martini’s Mahima Pandey, with 4.5/5 said, "Mishra Parivaar is back with another perfect season; life gets tough but they still make us smile."

Sunidhi Prajapat of OTTPlay rated the series 4/5 and praised the show, "The new installment of the Mishra family’s adventures takes you on a rollercoaster ride of emotions."

Abhimanyu Mathur of Hindustan Times said "Gullak's third season does get more dramatic and darker this time. The themes tackled are more serious than the previous two seasons. The stakes, at times, seem higher. The show isn't as light as it once was. But it is still well made. Even if it tackles serious issues, it does not get preachy or judgemental. It preserves the freshness."

Saibal Chatterjee of NDTV criticised the third season, saying that "The Writing Isn't As Impeccable This Time Around But Acting Is Absolutely Top-Notch."

Pankaj Shukl, writing in Amar Ujala, rated its third season at a 3.5/5 praising the series cast.
