= Mee Raqsam =

2020 Hindi drama film

- Promotional poster
- Directed by: Baba Azmi
- Written by: Safdar Mir; Husain Mir
- Produced by: Baba Azmi
- Starring: Naseeruddin Shah; Aditi Subedi; Danish Husain; Shraddha Kaul; Rakesh Chaturvedi Om
- Cinematography: Mohsin Khan Pathan
- Edited by: Pooraj Kapoor
- Music by: Ripul Sharma
- Production company: AZMI Pictures Pvt Ltd.
- Distributed by: ZEE5
- Release date: 21 August 2020
- Running time: 95 minutes
- Country: India
- Language: Hindi

Mee Raqsam is an Indian drama produced and directed by Baba Azmi. Written by Safdar Mir and Husain Mir, the film tells the story of a young Muslim girl who wants to become a dancer. It stars Naseeruddin Shah, Aditi Subedi, Danish Husain, Shraddha Kaul and Rakesh Chaturvedi Om in lead roles. Mee Raqsam was released on ZEE5 on 21 August 2020.

== Plot ==
The film shows a moving bond between father-daughter. Classical dance is the love of the girl's life and also becomes a weapon that defeats restrictive forces of society.The courage of a traditional Muslim who chooses his daughter's desire over obedience to his traditional minded elders. Mee Raqsam was filmed in Kaifi Azmi's native village of Mijwan in Azamgarh district.

== Cast ==
- Naseeruddin Shah as Hashim Seth
- Aditi Subedi as Mariam
- Danish Husain as Salim
- Shraddha Kaul as Zehra Khala
- Rakesh Chaturvedi Om as Mr. Jai Prakash
- Vikas Kumar Yadav as Chandu Bhaiya

== Reception ==
Shubhra Gupta of The Indian Express called it an "important film, whose heart is firmly in the right place, lighter on its feet." Soumya Srivastava of Hindustan Times mentioned that ‘'It's heart is in the right place'’ and some parts of the movie are going to stay with us for a long time." Nandini Ramnath of Scroll.in mentioned that "even though the conflict isn't particularly novel, Azmi's interpretation has given it layers".
