= Rohan Sippy =

Indian filmmaker

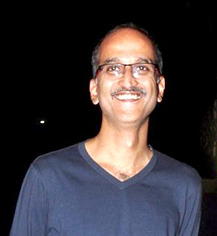
- Sippy in 2015
- Occupations: Film director; producer; screenwriter
- Spouses: Rohena Gera (div. 2003); Roopa Sippy (m. 2009)
- Children: 1
- Parent: Ramesh Sippy (father)
- Relatives: G. P. Sippy (grandfather)

Rohan Sippy is an Indian film director and producer, he worked as a director in films like Kuch Naa Kaho (2003), Bluffmaster! (2005), Dum Maaro Dum (2011) and Nautanki Saala (2013).

== Early life ==
He is the son of Ramesh Sippy, the director of the Hindi blockbuster film Sholay, and grandson of producer G. P. Sippy. Sippy studied at the Aiglon College in Switzerland and pursued his undergraduate degree at Stanford University.

== Personal life ==
Rohan Sippy was married to Rohena Gera, who also went to Stanford and is now a screenwriter. They got divorced in 2003. He then married Roopa in 2009. They had a baby girl named Inaya on 27 November 2012.

== Career ==
His latest directorial venture was Nautanki Saala! starring Ayushmann Khurrana and Kunaal Roy Kapur was released on 12 April 2013, in India.

== Filmography ==
Year	Film	Director	Producer	Writer	Notes
1995	Zamaana Deewana	No	Executive	No	
2003	Kuch Naa Kaho	Yes	No	No	
2005	Bluffmaster!	Yes	No	No	
2006	Taxi No. 9211	No	Yes	No	
2009	Chandni Chowk to China	No	Yes	No	
2009	The President Is Coming	No	Yes	No	
2011	Dum Maaro Dum	Yes	No	No	
2013	Nautanki Saala	Yes	No	Yes	
2013	Sonali Cable	No	Yes	No	
2016	Prime Time: How Tolerant Is India	Yes	Yes	Yes	Short film
2019	Junglee	No	No	Story	
2020	Shimla Mirchi	No	Yes	No	

=== Television ===
Year	Title	Director	Producer	Writer	Creator	Notes
2018	Side Hero	Yes	Yes	No	No	8 episodes
2018	Khan: No. 1 Crime Hunter	Yes	Yes	No	No	
2019	The Office	Yes	No	No	No	10 episodes
2020	Wakaalat From Home	Yes	Yes	No	Yes	10 episodes
2020	Criminal Justice: Behind Closed Doors	Yes	No	No	No	4 episodes only
2020	Sandwiched Forever	Yes	No	No	No	15 episodes
2021	Aranyak	No	Yes	Yes	Yes	Co-created with Charudutt Acharya
2022	Mithya	Yes	No	No	No	6 episodes
2022	Criminal Justice: Adhura Sach	Yes	No	No	No	
2023	Duranga	Yes	No	No	No	Season 2
2025	Criminal Justice: A Family Matter	Yes	No	No	No	8 episodes
2025	Search: The Naina Murder Case	Yes	No	No	No	
