= Pilgaonkar =

Pilgaonkar is a Konkani surname. Notable people with the surname include:

- Sachin Pilgaonkar (born 1957), Indian actor
- Shriya Pilgaonkar (born 1989), Indian actress
- Supriya Pilgaonkar (born 1967), Indian actress, wife of Sachin
