= Shriya Pilgaonkar =

Indian actress (born 1989)

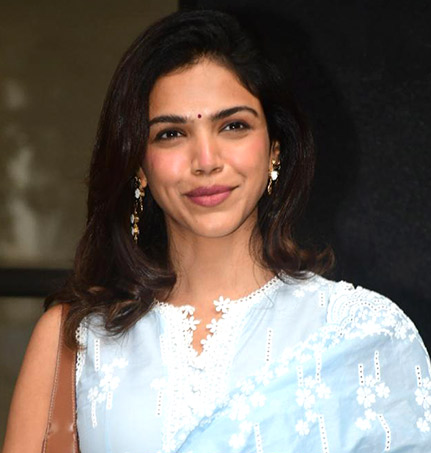
- Pilgaonkar in 2025
- Born: Shriya Sachin Pilgaonkar; 25 April 1989 (age 37); Bombay, Maharashtra, India
- Education: St. Xavier's College, Mumbai
- Occupation: Actress
- Years active: 2013–present
- Parents: Sachin Pilgaonkar (father); Supriya Pilgaonkar (mother)

Shriya Pilgaonkar (born 25 April 1989) is an Indian actress who primarily works in Hindi films and web series. Born to actors Sachin Pilgaonkar and Supriya Pilgaonkar, she made her acting debut with the Marathi film Ekulti Ek (2013), for which she earned the Maharashtra State Film Award for Best Debut.

Following her Hindi film debut with Fan (2016), Pilgaonkar went onto establish herself with successful web series such as Mirzapur (2018), Guilty Minds (2022), The Broken News (2022) and Taaza Khabar (2023). For Guilty Minds and the film Ishq-e-Nadaan (2023), she received nominations at the Filmfare OTT Awards. She has also acted in and directed various plays.

== Early life ==
Pilgaonkar was born on 25 April 1989 in Mumbai and is the only child of famed actors Sachin Pilgaonkar and Supriya Pilgaonkar. As a child, Pilgaonkar trained to become a professional swimmer and won several medals while in school. Believing that she might become a translator or a linguist when she grew up, Pilgaonkar also took classes in Japanese when she was a child. Later deciding to take a different route, Pilgaonkar completed her bachelor's degree in Sociology at St. Xavier's College in Mumbai. Pilgaonkar also learned Kathak as a child.

== Career ==
=== Early work (2012–2017) ===
At the age of five, Pilgaonkar first appeared on television in the Hindi serial Tu Tu Main Main, playing a boy named Bittu. Pilgaonkar made her stage debut in 2012 with her performance in Karan Shetty's 10-minute short play Freedom Of Love. The play was a part of the NCPA's Short and Sweet Festival. In the play, she acted, sang, and danced.

Pilgaonkar made her big screen debut with the 2013 Marathi film Ekulti Ek. In the film, she plays the role of Swara. She was offered the role of Swara by her father (Sachin Pilgaonkar) who wrote, directed, and produced the film. Pilgaonkar said, "He has been credited for launching many a talent, including my mother. When he offered me the film, I didn't want a favour. But he corrected me, saying, 'I am not stupid to invest resources without reason'." This movie led her to win many awards, including Maharashtra State Film Award for Best Debut Actress. A critic of The Times of India stated, "It's the perfect launch for his (Sachin Pilgaonkar) daughter Shriya into films and she does not disappoint."

Following her role in Ekulti Ek, she starred in plays, Internal Affairs and Common People. She then worked in the French film Un plus une, helmed by Oscar-winning director Claude Lelouch. In the film, she played the role of Ayanna, an Indian dancer, and actor.

Pilgaonkar made her Bollywood debut in the 2016 film Fan. Pilgaonkar was selected for her role from the audition of 750 girls conducted by Maneesh Sharma, and she considered getting a role alongside Shah Rukh Khan a big breakthrough. In the film, she plays the role of Neha, a Delhi-based call center girl, and Gaurav's friend. After the release of Fan, Pilgaonkar was overwhelmed by the response. Taran Adarsh from Bollywood Hungama termed her "wonderful".

=== Breakthrough (2018–2020) ===
Pilgaonkar played a strong and independent woman Sweety Gupta opposite Ali Fazal, in the series Mirzapur. Saraswati Datar of The News Minute noted, "Shriya as Sweety put in a great performance, but her role is woefully underwritten and unidimensional." The series was a massive success, and became a breakthrough for her, however she later confirmed that her character wouldn't be returning after the first season. In 2019, she did the film House Arrest with Fazal.

In 2020, she first played Nimmo alongside Sunny Kaushal in Bhangra Paa Le, which received negative reviews. In the same year, she played a social media influencer, Suhani in the first season of The Gone Game and a RAW agent Divya in Crackdown. She received positive response for both the series, and India Today stated that she "impresses" as Divya aka Mariam. Her only work in 2021, was the bilingual film Kaadan.

=== Career progression (2022–present) ===
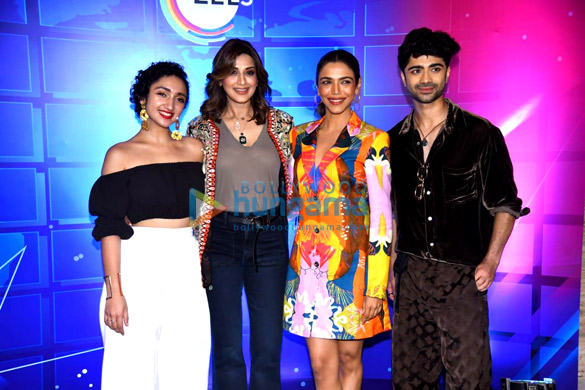
Pilgaonkar at The Broken News trailer launch

Pilgaonkar had four web releases in 2022. She first played Advocate Kashaf in Guilty Minds, alongside Varun Mitra, which won her critical acclaim. Saibal Chatterjee of NDTV stated, "Shriya Pilgaonkar is mesmerising as the honest-to-a-fault advocate." She then appeared in the second season of The Gone Game and hosted the web reality show, The Great Indian Bride. In her final role of the year, she played an investigative journalist Radha in The Broken News. Namrata Thakker from Rediff.com noted, "Shriya Pilgaonkar as Radha steals the show as the fiery, righteous journalist. She has flaws despite being an ethical journalist and that makes her character more humane."

In 2023, Pilgaonkar first played the titular role in the short film, Sita. She then played a sex worker Madhubala in Taaza Khabar, with Bhuvan Bam. Manik Sharma of Firstpost termed her "consistently good" and added that she played the role with "confidence". For this, she won the ITA Award for Best Actress Comedy - OTT. Pilgaonkar later played an independent pregnant woman Siya alongside Mrinal Dutt and Suhail Nayyar in the film Ishq-e-Nadaan. In her final work of the year, she played an outspoken wife Nirmala, in Dry Day opposite Jitendra Kumar. Rahul Desai from Film Companion said, "Shriya Pilgaonkar is underutilised in a narrative that's driven by her character's tenacity."

In her first web release of 2025, Pilgaonkar played Devika, a police officer in Chhal Kapat. Mayur Sanap of Rediff.com noted, "Despite the shaky proceedings, Pilgaonkar holds her own and shows the same spunk as her lead turn in Guilty Minds." She then played Rukmini, a mandala cult founder in Mandala Murders. Rahul Desai of The Hollywood Reporter India stated that she "nails her" role as the leader of the ambiguous cult.

== Other work and media image ==
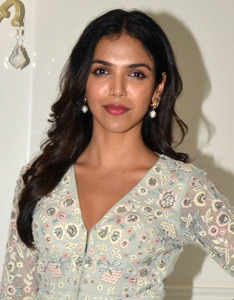
Pilgaonkar in 2018

Filmfare's Tanisha Bhattacharya noted, "Pilagonkar's performances in shows from diverse genres have raised the bar of what she has to offer as a gifted artist." Udita Jhunjhunwala of Scroll.in stated, "Shriya has evolved into one of the most dependable actors in web series." Pilgaonkar was placed at the 40th position in Times's 50 Most Desirable Women List of 2020. Pilgaonkar has modelled and is also known in the advertisement world. She has worked with celebrities such as Shahid Kapoor and Vikrant Massey, in advertisements. She has been a celebrity endorser of brands such as Rin, Vivel and Mom's Magic, with her mother Supriya Pilgaonkar.

In addition to being an actress, Pilgaonkar is also a director and a producer of short films. In 2012, she went to Harvard University for summer school, which led her to work on her own short films. In an interview with Mumbai Mirror, she said, "Once I felt confident, I directed Painted Signal, a short film, and Panchgavya", a documentary which she co-directed with Hana Kitasei. It examines the plight of cows as they wander around Bikaner in Rajasthan. She also co-directed and edited the short film Dresswala with Siddharth Joglekar, which was an official selection at the 2012 Mumbai Film Festival. Both Painted Signal and Dresswala received average responses from critics and were screened at international film festivals.

== Filmography ==
Key
†	Denotes films / dramas that are not yet released

=== Films ===
Year	Title	Role	Language	Notes	Ref.
2013	Ekulti Ek	Swara Deshpande	Marathi		
2015	Un plus une	Ayanna	French	Screened at 2015 Toronto International Film Festival	
2016	Fan	Neha Singh	Hindi		
2017	Jai Mata Di	Anu	Hindi	Short film	
2019	House Arrest	Saira	Hindi		
2020	Bhangra Paa Le	Nimmo	Hindi		
2021	Kaadan	Arundhati	Tamil	Trilingual film	
2021	Aranya	Arundhati	Telugu	Trilingual film	
2021	Haathi Mere Saathi	Arundhati	Hindi	Trilingual film	
2023	Sita	Sita	Hindi	Short film	
2023	Ishq-e-Nadaan	Siya	Hindi		
2023	Dry Day	Nirmala	Hindi		
2024	Navra Maza Navsacha 2	Herself	Marathi	Special appearance	
2026	Mirzapur: The Movie	Swaragini "Sweety" Gupta		Hindi	
2026	Haiwaan	Naina		Hindi	
TBA	Abhi Toh Party Shuru Hui Hai†	TBA		Hindi	

=== Television ===
Year	Title	Role	Notes	Ref.
1994	Tu Tu Main Main	Bittu		
2015	Stupid Cupid	Ishanvi		
2017	Crime Patrol	Unknown	Various episodes	
2019	Beecham House	Chanchal	British television series	

=== Web series ===
Year	Title	Role	Notes	Ref.
2018	13 Mussoorie	Aditi Bisht		
2018	Mirzapur	Swaragini "Sweety" Gupta	Season 1	
2020	Murder in Agonda	Sarla Salelkar		
2020	Crackdown	Divya Shirodkar / Mariam		
2020-2022	The Gone Game	Suhani Gujral	2 Seasons	
2022	Guilty Minds	Kashaf Quaze		
2022	The Broken News	Radha Bhargav	2 Seasons	
2022	The Great Indian Bride	Host		
2023-2024	Taaza Khabar	Madhubala "Madhu"	2 seasons	
2025	Chhal Kapat	SP Devika Rathore	Season 1	
2025	Mandala Murders	Rukmini		

=== Theatre ===
- All plays are in English unless otherwise noted.

Year	Title	Role	Notes	Ref.
1996	Freedom Of Love	—N/a		
2012	The Painted Signal	Director and producer	Short film	
2013	Dresswala	Director and producer	Short film	
2014	Internal Affairs	Rhea		
2014	Common People	Maya		
2015	Panchgavya	Director, producer and writer	Documentary film	
2016	Bombay Dying	—N/a		

== Awards and nominations ==
Year	Award	Category	Work	Result	Ref.
2013	Maharashtra State Film Awards	Best Debut Actress	Ekulti Ek	Won	
2013	Maharashtracha Favourite Kon?	Favourite Actress	Ekulti Ek	Nominated	
2022	Filmfare OTT Awards	Best Actress in a Drama Series	Guilty Minds	Nominated	
2022	Indian Film Festival of Melbourne	Best Actress in a Series	Guilty Minds	Nominated	
2022	Indian Film Festival of Melbourne	Best Actress in a Series	The Broken News	Nominated	
2023	Filmfare OTT Awards	Best Supporting Actress - Web Original Film	Ishq-e-Nadaan	Nominated	
2023	Indian Television Academy Awards	Best Actress - Comedy (OTT)	Taaza Khabar	Won	

== See also ==
- List of Hindi film actresses
- List of Indian film actresses
