= Home (Indian TV series) =

2018 Hindi web series

- Cover photo of HOME
- Genre: Drama
- Created by: Ekta Kapoor
- Based on: Campa Cola Compound Case
- Developed by: Ekta Kapoor
- Written by: Neeraj Udhwani
- Directed by: Habib Faisal
- Creative directors: Nimisha Pandey (ALTBalaji); Karishmaa Oluchi
- Starring: see below
- Country of origin: India
- Original languages: Hindi, English
- No. of seasons: 1
- No. of episodes: 12

Production
- Producers: Pintoo Guha; Rupali Guha
- Editor: Abhijit Deshpande
- Camera setup: Multi-camera
- Running time: 18-23 minutes
- Production company: Film Farm India

Original release
- Network: ALT Balaji
- Release: 29 August 2018

Home is a 2018 Hindi web series created by Ekta Kapoor for her video on demand platform ALTBalaji. The series stars a stellar cast comprising Annu Kapoor,Supriya Pilgaonkar, Amol Parashar, Parikshit Sahni, and Chetna Pandey and is directed by Habib Faisal. The web series revolves around the bond of a family and their fight against the system due to which they have to empty their 'Home'.

The series is available for streaming on the ALT Balaji App and its associated websites since its release date.

== Plot ==
The series revolves around a fictional middle-class Sethi family. The series explores how the family hold on to their values and finds happiness in little things. But their world comes crashing down when they are served an eviction notice by the authorities. The series explores how they fight the authorities, corporations and government to save their home.

== Cast ==
- Annu Kapoor as Himansh Brijmohan Sethi, father of Vansh & Hina
- Supriya Pilgaonkar as Vandana Himansh Sethi, Mother of Hina
- Amol Parashar as Vansh Himansh Sethi
- Parikshit Sahni as Brijmohan Sethi, Father of Himansh & Hriday
- Chetna Pande as Hina Rishi Shah, Himansh & Vandana Sethi's Elder Daughter
- Himani Shivpuri as Nirmala Manchanda
- Paritosh Sand as Hriday Brijmohan Sethi
- Pankaj Kalra as Mr.Motwani
- Avinash Kunte as Me. Gehi
- Fahmaan Khan as Rishi Shah, Hina's husband
- Sunny Hinduja as Mohsin
- Khalida Jan as Zulfiya, Mohsin's wife
- Ankit Shah as Pawan Gehi
- Sumit Suri as Karan Bajaj
- Amal Sehrawat as Vaibhav Suman

== Awards ==
| Year | Award | Category | Recipient | Result |
|---|---|---|---|---|
| 2018 | Streaming Awards - September Edition | Best Actor | Annu Kapoor | Won |
| 2018 | Streaming Awards - September Edition | Best Director | Habib Faisal | Won |
| 2018 | Indian Television Academy Awards | Best Story | Neeraj Udhwani | Nominated |
| 2018 | Indian Television Academy Awards | Best Dialogues | Neeraj Udhwani | Nominated |
| 2018 | Indian Television Academy Awards | Best Title Music | Hitesh Modak | Nominated |
| 2018 | Indian Television Academy Awards | Best Web Series | | Nominated |
| 2018 | Indian Television Academy Awards | Best Actor - Webseries | Annu Kapoor | Won |
| 2018 | Indian Television Academy Awards | Best Actress - Webseries | Supriya Pilgaonkar | Won |
| 2018 | Indian Television Academy Awards | Best Director - Webseries | Habib Faisal | Won |

== Reception ==
Supriya from The Quint writes "Though Home is among the better offerings of Balaji Telefilms, the demolition-themed web series could have done with some trimming of its own."
