= Kapuskonda =

2026 Marathi-language family drama film

- Directed by: Sachin Mohite
- Written by: Sachin Mohite; Ganesh Pandit; Hrishikesh Turai
- Produced by: Kumar Mangat Pathak; Abhishek Pathak; Murlidhar Chhatwani; Sachin Mohite; Snehal Mohite; Deepak Prabhu; Aniruddha Andhorikar
- Starring: Sachin Pilgaonkar; Madhurani Gokhale; Akshata Padgaonkar; Janhavi Tambat
- Cinematography: Sachin Patekar
- Edited by: Afzal Shaikh
- Music by: Songs: AV Prafullachandra; Score: Abhijeet Hegdepatil
- Production companies: Jaasvand Entertainments Pvt. Ltd.; Storywalla Film; VP Mauli Group of Companies
- Distributed by: Panorama Studios
- Release date: 23 October 2026
- Running time: 130 minutes
- Country: India
- Language: Marathi

Kapuskonda (transl. Cotton Husk) is a 2026 Indian Marathi-language family drama film written and directed by Sachin Mohite, and produced by Jaasvand Entertainments, Storywalla Film and VP Mauli Group of Companies. The film stars Sachin Pilgaonkar, Madhurani Gokhale, Akshata Padgaonkar and Janhavi Tambat in the lead roles. Billed as "A Family Dog Film" and inspired by a true incident, it tells the story of a retired postmaster who is afraid of dogs and gradually forms a bond with a puppy brought home by his daughter.

The film reunites Pilgaonkar and Gokhale 22 years after Navra Maza Navsacha (2004). It was released theatrically on 23 October 2026.

== Plot ==
Hamid is a postmaster who has a deep fear of dogs. He lives with his wife Nusrat and their two daughters, Sheena and Heena. On the day Hamid retires, Heena brings home a puppy. Hamid is at first unwilling to let the animal stay, but over time he grows close to it. Their bond is tested when the dog is seriously injured in a road accident, and Hamid sets out to save it.

== Cast ==
- Sachin Pilgaonkar as Hamid
- Madhurani Gokhale as Nusrat, Hamid's wife
- Janhavi Tambat as Sheena, Hamid's elder daughter
- Akshata Padgaonkar as Heena, Hamid's younger daughter
- Bhushan Patil as Keshav
- Bhau Kadam (voice)

== Production ==
The title role of Kapuskonda is played by a dog, which the makers promoted as the film's "hero". Pilgaonkar said that he had never worked on a story like it before, while Gokhale, who made her return to films with the project, said she was drawn to the story as soon as Mohite narrated it to her.

Most of the film was shot in Andhori, a village in Latur district, Maharashtra, chosen to suit the needs of the story.

== Soundtrack ==
Kapuskonda

Soundtrack album by AV Prafullachandra
- Released: 2026
- Genre: Feature film soundtrack
- Length: 10:33
- Label: Panorama Music Marathi

AV Prafullachandra chronology
Bol Bol Rani (2026)	Kapuskonda (2026)

The songs were composed by AV Prafullachandra, while the background score was composed by Abhijeet Hegdepatil.

Track listing
No.	Title	Lyrics	Singer(s)	Length
1.	"A Kapuskoondya"	AV Prafullachandra	Avadhoot Gupte	2:22
2.	"Thodi Tu Jaga De"	AV Prafullachandra	Padmanabh Gaikwad	2:47
3.	"Vitthal Vitthala"	Vaibhav Deshmukh	Ravindra Khomne	2:24
Total length:				7:33

== Marketing ==
A motion poster introducing the title character was released on social media on the occasion of Akshaya Tritiya in April 2026. The first look of the film was unveiled on Raksha Bandhan in August 2026, along with the announcement of the release date. A teaser was released next, followed by the official trailer in October 2026.

== Release ==
On 26 August 2026, Panorama Studios International announced that it had signed an agreement with Jaasvand Entertainments and Storywalla Film for the worldwide theatrical and non-theatrical rights to the film in perpetuity.

Kapuskonda was released in theatres on 23 October 2026. It was one of six Marathi films released that day, alongside Lagna Aani Barach Kahi, Dashami, Magazine, Mrutyuchakra and Sarpanch – The Power Man.

== Reception ==
Kapil Deshpande of Mumbai Tarun Bharat called it a "touchy story" and wrote, "The subject itself was actually bold. But Sachin Mohite is to be congratulated for the way he presented this subject on screen!"
