= Navra Maza Navsacha 2 =

2024 film by Sachin Pilgaonkar

- Theatrical release poster
- Directed by: Sachin Pilgaonkar
- Written by: Story and Screenplay: Sachin Pilgaonkar; Dialogues: Santosh Pawar
- Produced by: Sachin Pilgaonkar
- Starring: Sachin Pilgaonkar; Supriya Pilgaonkar; Hemal Ingle; Swapnil Joshi; Ashok Saraf; Nirmiti Sawant; Siddharth Jadhav; Vaibhav Mangle
- Cinematography: Parag Deshmukh; Nitin Bandekar
- Edited by: Faizal Mahadik
- Music by: Jitendra Kulkarni; Raviraj Vijay Koltharkar
- Production company: Sushriya Chitra
- Release date: 20 September 2024
- Running time: 143 minutes
- Country: India
- Language: Marathi
- Budget: ₹5–8 crore
- Box office: ₹25 crore

Navra Maza Navsacha 2 is a 2024 Indian Marathi-language comedy-drama film directed and produced by Sachin Pilgaonkar. A sequel to the 2004 film Navra Maza Navsacha, it features Hemal Ingle and Swapnil Joshi as the daughter and son-in-law of Sachin and Supriya Pilgaonkar. The film also stars Ashok Saraf, Siddharth Jadhav, and Nirmiti Sawant in supporting roles.

The film was theatrically released on 20 September 2024, the film earned ₹25 crore and emerged as the second highest-grossing Marathi film of 2024.

== Plot ==
Twenty years after fulfilling their sacred vow, Vakratund, also known as Vacky, and Bhakti are living a peaceful life with their daughter, Shraddha. Every year, the family follows a cherished family tradition of immersing a Ganesh idol on the shores of Ganpatipule. Shraddha, now deeply in love with Lambodar, also known as Lamby, has their relationship blessed by her parents. Vacky and Bhakti, wishing to include Lamby in their family customs, request him to continue the yearly Ganesh idol immersion after marriage. However, Lamby, an atheist, refuses to do so, leaving Vacky and Bhakti heartbroken. This decision causes tension, with Shraddha contemplating ending their relationship, but unexpected events compel Lamby to reconsider his stance. As tensions ease, Shraddha reveals that she, just like her mother, had made another vow. This vow requires Lamby to make a pilgrimage to the temple of Ganpatipule, but under the shocking condition that he must go unclothed. As this revelation unfolds, the situation spirals into chaos during their Konkan Railway train journey from Mumbai to Ganpatipule. Unbeknownst to them, Sabu Kaalia, the notorious younger brother of smuggler Babu Kaalia, and his gang are tracking their every move, due to the fact that they have stolen valuable diamonds worth ₹1800 crore from the Government of India and hidden them inside the family's Ganesh idol. What follows is a series of unexpected twists that turn their spiritual journey into a thrilling adventure.

== Cast ==
- Sachin Pilgaonkar as Vakratund (Vacky)
- Supriya Pilgaonkar as Bhakti
- Hemal Ingle as Shraddha
- Swapnil Joshi as Lambodar (Lamby)
- Ashok Saraf as Ticket checker in train
- Vaibhav Mangle as Sabu Kaalia / Devrukhkar (fake)
- Nirmiti Sawant as Lamby's mother (Special Appearance)
- Charudutt Patole as CID Inspector Pradyumna Ranade / Randy Cha
- Siddharth Jadhav as Yede-Patil (politician in train)
- Vijay Patkar as Inspector Haatware (Special appearance)
- Harish Dudhade as Ranga (Sabu Kaalia's henchman)
- Jaywant Wadkar as Yede-Patil's personal assistant
- Santosh Pawar in a special appearance
- Lilliput as Krishnamoorthy Radhamoorthy (a South Indian train passenger in a special appearance)
- Shriya Pilgaonkar in a special appearance in "Dum Dum Dum Dum Damroo Vaaje" song
- Ali Asgar as Laundry man (special appearance)
- Johnny Lever as Bahadur, special appearance in "Nako Na Gade" song
- Sonu Nigam as Himself, special appearance in "Nako Na Gade" song

== Production ==
On 5 February 2024, Sachin Pilgaonkar officially announced the sequel. Filming commenced on 7 February 2024 in Konkan, Maharashtra. The release date for the sequel was revealed on 20 July 2024. Production and dubbing were concluded in July 2024. Navra Maza Navsacha 2 was shot in Ratnagiri and various other locations within Konkan, Maharashtra. Siddharth Jadhav and Swapnil Joshi completed their dubbing sessions in July 2024.

== Music ==
The first single, "Dam Dam Dam Dam Damru Vaje," was released on 12 August 20, sung by Adarsh Shinde. The second track, "Supari Phutali", came out on 7 September 2024, featuring vocals by Sonu Nigam, Janavi Prabhu Arora, and Sandeep Ubale. The lyrical video of "Bharud" is released on 20 September 2024.

Track listing
| No. | Title | Lyrics | Music | Singer (s) | Length |
|---|---|---|---|---|---|
| 1. | "Dum Dum Dum Dum Dumroo Vaje" | Traditional folk, Pravin Danave | Raviraj Vijay Koltharkar | Sachin Pilgaonkar, Adarsh Shinde | 5:07 |
| 2. | "Supari Phutli" | Vaibhav Joshi | Jitendra Kulkarni | Sonu Nigam, Janvee Prabhu Arora, Sandeep Ubale, Chorus | 3:59 |
| 3. | "Bharud" | Santosh Pawar | Authentic Folk of Maharashtra (Bharud), Raviraj Vijay Koltharkar (arrangement) | Siddharth Jadhav | 2:29 |
| 4. | "Nako Na Gade" | Avadhoot Gupte | Avadhoot Gupte | Avadhoot Gupte, Sonu Nigam, Johnny Lever, Janhavi Prabhu Arora | 4:23 |

== Release ==
The film is scheduled to be theatrically released on 20 September 2024 across Maharashtra and Amazon Prime on 11 November 2024 The film was released outside Maharashtra in Hyderabad, Bangalore, and Belgaum. Additionally, with support from the North American Film Association, it premiered in the US, Canada, Australia, and New Zealand.

=== Marketing ===
The first poster was launched on 5 August 2024. A promo featuring Ashok Saraf was released on 19 July 2024 with the release date being announced the next day. The release date was announced on 20th July. The teaser was released on 15 August 2024, coinciding with Independence Day.

== Reception ==
=== Critical reception ===
Mihir Bhanage of The Times of India rated 3.0/5 and highlights that Navra Maza Navsacha 2 is a lighthearted, family-oriented comedy that leans heavily on situational humor and punchlines, reminiscent of classic Marathi comedies. Chinmay Jagtap of Sakal rated 2.5/5 and pointed out that Navra Maza Navsacha 2 is a highly anticipated family comedy that succeeds primarily due to its strong performances from a talented cast. He notes that the film tells a relatable story about a vow, featuring the nostalgic element of traveling by Konkan Railway.

=== Box office ===
The film earned ₹2.25 crore on its opening day and worldwide grossed ₹9.5 crore over its first weekend, while the India net collection is ₹7.84 crore. On its tenth day, the film collections totaled ₹18.57 crore. The film had grossed ₹24 crore by its fourth week and ultimately finished its theatrical run with a total gross of over ₹25 crore.
