= Mandala Murders =

2025 Indian TV series

- Poster
- Genre: Crime thriller Mystery; Supernatural horror
- Created by: Gopi Puthran
- Written by: Gabe Gabriel; Matt Graham; Avinash Dwivedi; Chirag Garg; Gopi Puthran
- Directed by: Gopi Puthran; Manan Rawat
- Starring: Vaani Kapoor; Vaibhav Raj Gupta; Surveen Chawla; Raghubir Yadav; Shriya Pilgaonkar
- Composers: Sanchit Balhara; Ankit Balhara
- Country of origin: India
- Original language: Hindi
- No. of seasons: 1
- No. of episodes: 8

Production
- Executive producers: Aditya Chopra; Uday Chopra; Yogendra Mogre; Akshaye Widhani
- Production locations: Uttar Pradesh, India
- Cinematography: Shaz Mohammed
- Editors: Mitesh Soni; Meghna Manchanda Sen
- Running time: 39–49 minutes
- Production company: YRF Entertainment

Original release
- Network: Netflix
- Release: 25 July 2025 – present

Mandala Murders is a 2025 Indian Hindi-language crime thriller series that premiered on Netflix on 25 July 2025. Created and co-directed by Gopi Puthran, alongside Manan Rawat, the series is produced by YRF Entertainment and is based on the novel The Butcher of Benares. Set in the fictional town of Charandaspur, Uttar Pradesh, it blends mystery, supernatural horror, and psychological thriller elements. The series follows detectives Rea Thomas and Vikram Singh as they investigate ritualistic murders linked to a secret cult, the Aayastis, and a mythical entity called Yast.

The series stars Vaani Kapoor, Vaibhav Raj Gupta, Surveen Chawla, Raghubir Yadav, and Shriya Pilgaonkar in key roles. Spanning eight episodes, it explores themes of faith vs science and love vs sacrifice, combining modern police procedural with occult practices. Reviews have been mixed, with praise for its atmospheric world-building, cinematography, and performances, but criticism for uneven pacing and narrative complexity.

== Plot ==
Set in the fictional Charandaspur, Uttar Pradesh, Mandala Murders follows CIB officer Rea Thomas (Vaani Kapoor) and suspended cop Vikram Singh (Vaibhav Raj Gupta) as they investigate ritualistic murders orchestrated by the Aayastis, a cult seeking to resurrect a god-like entity, Yast, using human body parts arranged in a mandala pattern. The narrative alternates between the present and 1950s flashbacks, revealing the cult’s origins through Rukmini (Shriya Pilgaonkar), its founder, and Rea’s grandmother, who opposed it. As the detectives uncover personal ties to the cult, they confront political figure Ananya Bhardwaj (Surveen Chawla), who drives its modern revival. The investigation leads to a climactic showdown in underground chambers, where Rea disrupts the final ritual, though the cult’s influence lingers.

== Cast ==
- Vaani Kapoor in a dual role as
  - Rea Thomas, a determined CIB officer
  - Nandini Pant, a particle physicist
- Vaibhav Raj Gupta as Vikram Singh, a suspended cop with a traumatic past
- Surveen Chawla as Ananya Bhardwaj, a politician
- Aman Vasishth as Anupam, CIB agent
- Raghubir Yadav as Kaivalya, a cryptic figure with cult knowledge
- Shriya Pilgaonkar as Rukmini, the cult’s 1950s founder
- Aaditi Pohankar as Moksha
- Monica Chaudhary as Kavita Bhardwaj, Vikram's love interest and Ananya's sister
- Piloo Vidyarthi as Kalindi
- Azzy Bagria as Constable
- Jameel Khan as Jimmy Khan, a local aiding the investigation
- Sharat Sonu as SHO Pramod Sahni, Vikram’s friend
- Manu Rishi as Vishwanath Singh, Vikram’s father
- Sukhita Aiyar in a chitti
- Anang Desai as Giyasuddin Khan
- Kiran Karmarkar as Naveen Desai
- Aakash Dahiya as Abhishek Sahay
- Utkarsha Naik as Leela Yadav
- Siddhanth Kapoor as Ajay Yadav
- Rahul Bagga as Sujoy Yadav
- Leena Balodi as Maithili
- Saad Baba as Mallick
- Edward Sonnenblick as Robert MacCauley
- Ipshita Chakraborty Singh as Vasudha Singh
- Ishan Saxena as Awdesh
- Saurabh Dubey as Vaitarni
- Yogendra Vikram Singh as Vyankat
- Ekanthika Brahmne as Noor
- Rati Shankar Tripathi as Pratap Singh
- Sunny Hinduja as Anant Pant
- Rahul Singh as Jairaj
- Sambhavna Seth as Hema

== Production ==
=== Development ===
Developed by YRF Entertainment, Mandala Murders is the studio’s second major web series after The Railway Men. Created by Gopi Puthran, known for Mardaani 2, it adapts The Butcher of Benares into a mythological-crime thriller. Puthran co-directed with Manan Rawat, with writing by Gabe Gabriel, Matt Graham, Avinash Dwivedi, Chirag Garg, and Puthran.

=== Filming ===
Filmed across five cities in Uttar Pradesh, the series depicts Charandaspur with a dark, atmospheric aesthetic. Shaz Mohammed’s cinematography captures the town’s dusty lanes and the eerie Varuna Forest, contrasting modern and historical timelines.

== Release ==
Mandala Murders premiered on Netflix on 25 July 2025, with all eight episodes released simultaneously. Promoted as a "mythological-crime thriller," its trailer was shared on Netflix’s platforms.

== Episodes ==
The first season consists of eight episodes, released on 25 July 2025.

No.	Title	Directed by	Written by	Original release date
1	"Chapter 1"	Gopi Puthran	Gopi Puthran, Avinash Dwivedi	25 July 2025
In 1950s Charandaspur, a ritual fails. In 2025, Vikram Singh discovers a torso-less corpse, launching a murder investigation tied to his past.
2	"Chapter 2"	Manan Rawat	Chirag Garg, Gabe Gabriel	25 July 2025
Rea Thomas arrives in Charandaspur, meeting Ananya Bhardwaj. Vikram confronts a figure from his past, deepening the mystery.
3	"Chapter 3"	Gopi Puthran	Matt Graham, Gopi Puthran	25 July 2025
Shastri, a shadow worshipper, warns Rea of a dark prophecy. Vikram learns about the mandala symbol’s significance.
4	"Chapter 4"	Manan Rawat	Avinash Dwivedi, Chirag Garg	25 July 2025
Haunted by his past, Vikram teams with Rea to decode eight mandalas linked to the murders, aiming to prevent an attack.
5	"Chapter 5"	Gopi Puthran	Gabe Gabriel, Matt Graham	25 July 2025
Rea searches for the princess’s identity, sharing her fears with Vikram. Jimmy Khan cracks a code, while Ananya asserts control.
6	"Chapter 6"	Manan Rawat	Chirag Garg, Gopi Puthran	25 July 2025
Ancient texts at Monalisa Curio reveal the cult’s history, pushing Rea and Vikram closer to the truth.
7	"Chapter 7"	Gopi Puthran	Avinash Dwivedi, Matt Graham	25 July 2025
Vyankat’s revelations shock Vikram. Rea races to save a child from becoming the next victim.
8	"Chapter 8"	Gopi Puthran	Gopi Puthran, Gabe Gabriel	25 July 2025
Vikram is kidnapped for the Yast ritual. Rea confronts Ananya in the underground chambers, disrupting the resurrection.

== Reception ==
Mandala Murders received mixed reviews. Critics praised its atmospheric world-building, Shaz Mohammed’s cinematography, and performances, particularly Vaani Kapoor’s commanding OTT debut and Vaibhav Raj Gupta’s emotional depth. The depiction of Charandaspur and the Varuna Forest was lauded for its gothic atmosphere. However, the series was criticised for uneven pacing, a convoluted narrative, and excessive exposition. Hindustan Times described it as “tiresome” due to a patchy screenplay, noting it only gained momentum by episode seven. The Times of India recommended it for lore-heavy thriller fans, despite its complexity.

Hardika Gupta of NDTV gave 2.5 stars out 5 and said that "It's a fascinating mess, occasionally brilliant, often frustrating and always drenched in blood and questions." Bollywood Hungama gave it 3 stars and said that "Overall, *Mandala Murders* is an engaging and ambitious thriller that boldly ventures into new storytelling territory with its haunting atmosphere, multi-layered narrative, and a chilling cult subplot that lends it a compellingly dark twist. Yet, the show isn’t flawless—its intricate plot and large ensemble cast can become a bit too much to keep track of, and some lapses in logic might challenge the audience's willingness to go along with it."

Lachmi Deb Roy of Firstpost gave it 3.5 stars out of 5 and observed that "the blend of sci-fi with mythology is what makes Mandala Murders different. Binge-watch it or just watch it at one go, the way I did, but don’t give it a miss." Sukanya Verma of Rediff.com rated 1/5 stars and said that "There's an obvious attempt to startle with its gruesome imagery of severed heads skewered on chopped limbs and peeled-off faces but it's too tacky to elicit any real dread." Deepa Gahlot writing for Scroll.in said that "Mandala Murders aims to blend sci-fi with mythology but makes a hash of it. The sci-fi is laughable – a particle physicist builds a wish-fulfilling machine that looks like a cartoon robot and demands the sacrifice of a thumb (for what?). The mythology is mostly mumbo-jumbo.

Rahul Desai of The Hollywood Reporter India observed that "It remains distant, like an academic paper aiming to impress, not art hoping to express. As a result, Mandala Murders gets hard to watch after the first few episodes — a curious case of ambition going through an existential crisis. It’s the cinematic equivalent of a talented guy who lowers his intellect around his friends only to realise that he’s lost the ability to be sharp and dreamy." Aishwarya Vasudevan of OTT Play gave 2.5 stars and writes "Mandala Murders blends horror, history, and mystery with chilling ambition. Though flawed and slow-burning, its eerie intrigue and layered storytelling keep you hooked till the haunting end." Suchin Mehrotra of The Quint rated it 1/5 stars and said that "In the end, Mandala Murders is eight episodes of characters we barely know and feel for, doing things we don't understand, for agendas and motives that are poorly explained, building to revelations that barely make sense, peppered with twists that happen because they can. It doesn't even work on most basic levels of a violent, pulpy thriller along the lines of Asur, which appears to be a clear inspiration here."
