= Sharmaji Namkeen =

Hindi film directed by Hitesh Bhatia

- Official release poster
- Directed by: Hitesh Bhatia
- Written by: Supratik Sen; Hitesh Bhatia
- Produced by: Farhan Akhtar; Ritesh Sidhwani; Honey Trehan; Abhishek Chaubey
- Starring: Rishi Kapoor; Paresh Rawal; Juhi Chawla; Suhail Nayyar; Isha Talwar; Sulagna Panigrahi
- Cinematography: Piyush Puty; Harendra Singh
- Edited by: Bodhaditya Banerjee
- Music by: Sneha Khanwalkar
- Production companies: Excel Entertainment; MacGuffin Pictures
- Distributed by: Amazon Prime Video
- Release date: 31 March 2022
- Running time: 119 minutes
- Country: India
- Language: Hindi

Sharmaji Namkeen (transl. Sharmaji's Savoury Snacks) is a 2022 Indian Hindi-language comedy drama film written and directed by debutante Hitesh Bhatia, co-written by Supratik Sen, and produced by Ritesh Sidhwani and Farhan Akhtar under Excel Entertainment as well as Honey Trehan and Abhishek Chaubey under MacGuffin Pictures. Marking the first instance in Hindi film history of two actors playing the same character simultaneously, it stars Rishi Kapoor (in his posthumous final film appearance) and Paresh Rawal as the titular character, with Juhi Chawla, Satish Kaushik, Sheeba Chaddha, Isha Talwar, Suhail Nayyar and Taaruk Raina in supporting roles.

The film began production in January 2020 but filming was halted due to Rishi Kapoor's death on 30 April 2020. Paresh Rawal was cast to finish Kapoor's remaining scenes. The film premiered on Amazon Prime Video on 31 March 2022.

== Plot ==
Brij Gopal Sharma a.k.a. Sharmaji, a middle-class widower, is asked to retire by his company Madhuban Home Appliances at the age of 58, much to his annoyance. A healthy and lively man, he lives with his sons Sandeep "Rinku" Sharma and Vinayak "Vincy" Sharma at his rather small home in Subhash Nagar, West Delhi. Rinku is in a relationship with his colleague Urmi Kaul, and the two of them plan on buying a flat in Gurgaon after they get married. Vincy is a final year B.Com student who is passionate about dance. Sharmaji is averse to the idea of moving away from his home of the past many years, causing Rinku to hide the fact that he is finalizing his apartment deal.

Seeking to overcome boredom, Sharmaji decides to venture into other hobbies, and also applies for a few jobs. After looking into Zumba classes, property brokerage, and various other small jobs, he reluctantly agrees, at the suggestion of his childhood friend Chaddha, to cook for kitty parties after an acquaintance of the latter, Manju Gulati, thanks him for a cooking job done well. During a second such party, he befriends Veena Manchanda, a boutique owner whose husband died in a car crash three years ago. He is warmly welcomed by the members of the kitty and soon caters to many occasions. At one such party, he meets Veena's dear friend Robbie Sachdeva, a politician, and he cooks for a religious meeting at the latter's place.

On his birthday, Rinku invites their extended family over, and someone comes across a video of Sharmaji dancing at a kitty party. Rinku and Vincy are humiliated and furious at this and an argument ensues between the three of them, wherein Vincy reveals that Rinku is moving out and Rinku blurts out that Vincy failed his exams. Sharmaji is distraught at this but nevertheless, he continues to follow his passion.

Veena and Sharmaji bond over the parties, and soon become close friends. One day, Sharmaji and Vincy overhear Rinku fighting with the developer, a certain Mr. Jain. He tells them that all is well. That night, they meet Urmi's parents, where Sharmaji finds out that Urmi's father knows more about the flat than he does. On the way back, he confronts Rinku, who confesses that Jain is delaying the possession of the flat and that he paid 15 lakh rupees (₹1,500,000) as token money (deposit). Sharmaji is devastated to learn that his son spent so much money without even informing him, and decides to stop his catering hobby to focus more on affairs back home.

Rinku is informed at a municipal office that Jain has constructed the flats on illegal land, and is advised to get his token money back and get out of the deal. At a lunch with Urmi, he has a disagreement with her which leads to her leaving. When Jain refuses to answer his calls, a drunk Rinku arrives at Jain's office and attempts to go in. After being blocked by the security guards at Jain's office, he attacks them and is arrested. Sharmaji is at a final kitty party when he gets the call from the station that his son has been arrested. He rushes to the police station with the ladies, and a comical turn of events ensues. The police is revealed to be in cahoots with Jain. Sharmaji is put behind bars along with his son, while the ladies are made to sit in a corner. Unbeknownst to the constable, Sharmaji has a phone inside the cell. Veena communicates with Sharmaji, using hand signals, to call Robbie who uses his power as the Mayor of West Delhi to release them. While Sharmaji learns that Robbie is Veena's brother-in-law, Robbie asks Rinku to meet Jain later to retrieve his money.

While being driven back home, Rinku realizes his mistake and apologizes to his father for not being a good son. Sharmaji accepts his apology, and they all go back home.

== Cast ==
- Rishi Kapoor as Brij Gopal Sharma a.k.a. Sharmaji
  - Paresh Rawal appears as Sharmaji in scenes not featuring Kapoor, which were filmed after his demise
- Juhi Chawla as Veena Manchanda
- Ashok Chhabra as Mrs. Gulati's father-in-Law
- Suhail Nayyar as Sandeep "Rinku" Sharma, Sharmaji's elder son
- Isha Talwar as Urmi Kaul
- Taaruk Raina as Vinayak "Vincy" Sharma, Sharmaji's younger son
- Satish Kaushik as K. K. Chaddha, Sharmaji's friend
- Sulagna Panigrahi as Aarti Bhatia
- Sheeba Chaddha as Manju Gulati
- Ayesha Raza Mishra as Rupali Dhingra
- Parmeet Sethi as Mayor Robbie Sachdeva, Veena's brother-in-law
- Gufi Paintal as Rajender Sharma
- Shishir Sharma as Mr. Kaul, Urmi's father
- Suparna Marwah as Mrs. Kaul, Urmi's mother

Additionally, Ranbir Kapoor is featured in a pre-film message. He, along with Aadar Jain, Alia Bhatt, Tara Sutaria, Ananya Panday, Arjun Kapoor, Aamir Khan, Vicky Kaushal, Farhan Akhtar, Kareena Kapoor and Siddhant Chaturvedi, appeared in a special tribute to Rishi Kapoor.

== Soundtrack ==
Sharmaji Namkeen

Soundtrack album by Sneha Khanwalkar
- Released: 24 March 2022
- Genre: Feature film soundtrack
- Length: 13:07
- Label: Zee Music Company
- Producers: Farhan Akhtar; Ritesh Sidhwani

Sneha Khanwalkar chronology
Raat Akeli Hai (2020)	Sharmaji Namkeen (2022)	TBA

Official audio
- Sharmaji Namkeen - Full Album on YouTube

The film's music is composed by Sneha Khanwalkar with lyrics written by Gopal Datt.

Track listing
No.	Title	Singer(s)	Length
1.	"Ye Luthrey"	Jasbir Jassi	3:26
2.	"Laal Tamatar"	Kanika Kapoor, Sneha Khanwalkar	3:34
3.	"Boom Boom"	Kailash Kher, Raja Mushtaq	3:06
4.	"Aaram Karo"	Gopal Datt	3:01
Total length:			13:07

== Reception ==
The film received positive reviews from critics and audience with praise for its performances and direction. On the review aggregator website Rotten Tomatoes, 92% of 12 critics' reviews are positive, with an average rating of 6.3/10.

Renuka Vyavahare of The Times Of India gave the film a rating of 4/5. Sukanya Verma of Rediff gave the film a rating of 4/5 and wrote, "Sharmaji Namkeen is Rishi Kapoor's swansong and show. His cinematic memories are coloured in liveliest hues of celebration and happiness."

Simran Singh of Dna India gave the film a rating of 3.5/5 and wrote, "Sharmaji Namkeen is a perfect ode to Rishi Kapoor, and this feel-good cinema is a fun-filled, emotional rollercoaster ride for the family." Shubham Kulkarni of Koimoi gave the film a rating of 3.5/5 and wrote, "It marks the end of an era of Indian cinema and maybe the beginning of many good things." Prateek Sur of Outlook India gave the film a rating of 3.5/5 and wrote, "Actor Rishi Kapoor's last film is a sweet and simple tale about parents after their retirement." Pratikshya Mishra of The Quint gave the film a rating of 3.5/5 and stated, "'Sharmaji Namkeen' is a fitting send off to Rishi Kapoor's skill and stature." Saibal Chatterjee of NDTV gave the film a rating of 3/5 and wrote, "In what is obviously an unusual experiment, Paresh Rawal steps into the breach in several key scenes, including the crucial climactic ones." Anna M. M. Vetticad of Firstpost gave the film a rating of 3/5 and wrote, "The single-role-divided-between-two-actors experiment is perfectly sewed by the naturalism in Hitesh Bhatia's storytelling, and the decision not to overtly manipulate our emotions either." Taran Adarsh of Bollywood Hungama gave the film a rating of 3/5 and wrote, "Despite its shortcomings, SHARMAJI NAMKEEN is a heartwarming film and will leave viewers smiling."

Shubhra Gupta of Indian Express gave the film a rating of 2.5/5 and wrote, "Rishi Kapoor is truly namkeen in this film, showing us how it is done, light on his feet, light in his eyes, a will to live. Jeena isi ka naam hai." Tushar Joshi of India Today stated, "The story of Sharmaji Namkeen, Rishi Kapoor's last film, is not new but is a reminder that we've lost a terrific actor." Monika Rawal Kukreja of Hindustan Times stated, "Rishi Kapoor and Paresh Rawal seamlessly share the story of an endearing retiree."
