= Aetbaar =

2004 Indian film by Vikram Bhatt

- Movie poster for Aetbaar
- Directed by: Vikram Bhatt
- Screenplay by: Robin Bhatt; Sanjeev Duggal
- Dialogues by: Girish Dhamija
- Story by: Vikram Bhatt; Robin Bhatt
- Produced by: Ratan Tata; Jatin Kumar; Khushroo Bhadha; Mandeep Singh
- Starring: Amitabh Bachchan; John Abraham; Bipasha Basu; Supriya Pilgaonkar
- Cinematography: Pravin Bhatt
- Edited by: Kuldip K. Mehan
- Music by: Rajesh Roshan
- Production company: Tata Infomedia
- Distributed by: Cutting Edge Entertainment
- Release date: 23 January 2004
- Running time: 156 minutes
- Country: India
- Language: Hindi
- Budget: ₹95 million
- Box office: ₹80 million

Aetbaar (transl. 'Trust') is a 2004 Indian Hindi-language romantic psychological thriller film directed by Vikram Bhatt and produced by Ratan Tata. The film stars Amitabh Bachchan, John Abraham, Bipasha Basu and Supriya Pilgaonkar. Aetbaar was inspired by the 1996 American film Fear.

Indiagames also released a mobile video game based on the film.

== Plot ==
Dr. Ranveer is extremely protective of his college-going daughter, Ria, as a result of his son's death many years prior due to a car accident. One night, while walking home from college, she is run over by a rickshaw gang. She yells at them until one of the members helps her pick up her notebooks.

Ria and her friends go to a nightclub, and the same man who helped Ria walks up to her. She is surprised to see him again and is shocked when he tells her that he hasn't stopped thinking about her ever since that night. He forces her to dance with him, making her feel uncomfortable. Dr. Ranveer arrives to collect Ria. The man introduces himself as Aryan before she leaves. Aryan and his friends go to a brothel where a prostitute, Saira, teases Aryan when he refuses to sleep with her. He takes her to a room where she believes they are going to have sex, but Aryan brutally beats her. Dr. Ranveer is called to the hospital to treat her.

The next morning, Aryan walks into one of Ria's classes and takes her to his apartment, where he shows her a portrait he made of her. When she tells him the portrait is beautiful, he proceeds to light it on fire and tells her that nothing in the world is more beautiful than her. She runs out of his apartment terrified, but realizes that she has fallen in love with him. The pair begin to spend more time with each other. Ria's parents plan a surprise vacation. They arrive at the cabin, and Ria thinks about Aryan. While cleaning the cabin, Ria sees Aryan waiting outside. Dr. Ranveer stops them together and asks Ria to invite him over for lunch. When Aryan comes over, he makes a good first impression on her mother but fails to impress Dr. Ranveer.

Aryan attempts to steal a car along with his friends. In the process, one of his friends gets injured, and they take him to the hospital. Dr. Ranveer tells Saira that her wounds would eventually heal. She sees Aryan and identifies Aryan as her attacker.

While trying to find a colleague's number, Dr. Ranveer finds an old article where he learns that Aryan had killed his own father, and he informs Ria and his wife. Ria confronts Aryan, who reveals that his father was an alcoholic who killed his wife. To avenge her death, he burnt his father alive. Ria apologizes and makes up with Aryan. She tries to explain Aryan's innocence to her parents. Ria yells at her father, calling him overprotective as a result of his son's death. Ria's mother slaps her, and she lets them know that she hates them.

Dr. Ranveer decides to learn more about Aryan's past and learns that Aryan's mother is still alive, and the reason behind why Aryan killed his father was because Aryan was madly in love with his college teacher Sanjana. She gets married and leaves for America, but before she leaves, Aryan comes to her house and attempts to kill her. His father calls the police, and Aryan is locked away in his room. Sanjana thanks Aryan's father and leaves, but Aryan sets his room on fire. His father bursts into his room, and Aryan pushes him into the fire, killing him.

Dr. Ranveer devises a plan to lure Aryan into believing that Sanjana is in fact alive to haunt him. Ria feels guilty about trusting and loving Aryan, and Aryan gets arrested for Sanjana's attempted murder.

Sometime later, Dr. Ranveer receives a call from the police and finds out that Aryan has escaped from prison. Ria informs her parents that Aryan knows their whereabouts and will hunt them down. Aryan and his friends break into the cabin, and Aryan attempts to kidnap Ria. Dr. Ranveer had earlier setup a trap that instantly killed him.

== Cast ==
- Amitabh Bachchan as Dr. Ranveer Malhotra, a doctor from Goa who is very protective of his daughter Ria but failed to protect his son Rohit.
- John Abraham as Aryan Trivedi, a deadly and obsessed man who is madly in love with Ria.
- Bipasha Basu as Ria Malhotra, a young college student who is also Sheetal & Ranveer's daughter.
- Supriya Pilgaonkar as Sheetal Malhotra, Ranveer's wife and Ria's mother.
- Ali Asgar as Deepak, Ria's friend
- Ramona Sunavala as Natasha, Ria's friend
- Amardeep Jha as Mrs. Trivedi, Aryan's mother.
- Tom Alter as Dr. Freddie, Ranveer's friend.
- Pramod Moutho as Police Commissioner Lalit Mohan Tiwari
- Shruti Ulfat as Sanjana, Aryan's college teacher who left for America to get married.
- Prithvi Zutshi as Dev Trivedi, Aryan's father, who was burnt alive.
- Deepak Shirke as Police Inspector

== Soundtrack ==
Aetbaar

Soundtrack album by Rajesh Roshan
- Released: 20 October 2003
- Recorded: 2003
- Genre: Feature film soundtrack
- Label: Sony Music India

The entire soundtrack is available on Sony Music.

| # | Title | Singer(s) | Lyricist(s) |
|---|---|---|---|
| 1 | "Tum Mujhe Bas Yun Hi" | Kumar Sanu, Madhushree | Nasir Faraaz |
| 2 | "Aetbaar" | Abhijeet, Alka Yagnik | Dev Kohli |
| 3 | "Chhodo Chhodo" | Udit Narayan, Sunidhi Chauhan | Ibrahim Ashq |
| 4 | "Jeena Hai Kis Liye" | Amitabh Bachchan | Chandrashekhar Rajit |
| 5 | "Na Nazron Ka" | Babul Supriyo, Shweta Pandit | Maya Govind |
| 6 | "Saansein Ghulne Lageen" | Sonu Nigam, Shreya Ghoshal | Chandrashekhar Rajit |
| 7 | "The Feel of Aetbaar" (Instrumental) | | |
