= Madhurani Gokhale =

Indian actress

Madhurani Gokhale-Prabhulkar
- Born: Madhurani Gokhale; 2 March 1976 (age 50); Bhusawal, Maharashtra, India
- Occupation: Actress
- Years active: 2000–present
- Spouse: Pramod Prabhulkar (m. 2003)
- Children: 1

Madhurani Gokhale-Prabhulkar (née Gokhale; born 2 March) is an Indian actress, singer and Music composer. She known for her performance in Aai Kuthe Kay Karte!

== Career ==
She started her career at the age of 16 and won the Purushottam Award for her own scripted play. She started her own film production course. She showed off her skills as a singer in the celebrity show Sa Re Ga Ma Pa and got a film Sundar Maze Ghar. She made her first breakthrough from Indradhanushya series on Zee Marathi. In 2004, she produced the film God Gupit. She also acted in Tumcha Aamcha Same Asta. In 2004, she did a supporting role in Navra Maza Navsacha. Currently, she is playing a lead role in Aai Kuthe Kay Karte!

== Filmography ==
=== Films ===
Year	Show	Role	Ref.
2000	Lekru	Madhavi	
2004	Navra Maza Navsacha	VJ Candy	
2006	Namdar Mukhyamantri Ganpya Gawde	TV Host	
2009	Sundar Maze Ghar	Gauri	
2010	Mani Mangalsutra	Gauri	
2016	Jithun Padlya Gathi	Ashwini Barve	
2018	Bhabhipedia	Mrs. Banerjee	
2019	Arohan	Aditi	
2026	Kapuskonda	Nusrat	

=== Television ===
Year	Serial	Role
2003	Indradhanushya	Shraddha
2007	Yanda Kartavya Aahe	Host
2007	Hich Mazi Maitrin	Host
2008	Sa Re Ga Ma Pa	Contestant
2007–2009	Asambhav	Poonam Shastri
2012-2014	Ambat Goad	
2019–2024	Aai Kuthe Kay Karte!	Arundhati Kelkar
2022	Aata Hou De Dhingana	Contestant
2026	Mi Savitribai Jotirao Phule	Savitribai Phule
