= House Arrest (2019 film) =

Indian Hindi-language comedy on Netflix

- Film poster
- Directed by: Samit Basu; Shashanka Ghosh
- Written by: Samit Basu
- Starring: Ali Fazal; Shriya Pilgaonkar; Jim Sarbh; Barkha Singh
- Production company: India Stories
- Distributed by: Netflix
- Release date: 15 November 2019
- Running time: 104 minutes
- Country: India
- Language: Hindi

House Arrest is a 2019 Indian comedy film directed by Samit Basu and Shashanka Ghosh and written by Samit Basu. It released on 15 November 2019 through Netflix.

== Plot ==
In this comedy of errors, a betrayed man on voluntary self-confinement faces the simultaneous arrival of a peculiar package, and a curious journalist.

After being betrayed by his wife, Karan quits his regular job and locks himself in. He only receives daily groceries via the neighbourhood caretaker. Even stepping out induces extreme anxiety within him.

One evening, a neighbour, Pinky, drops off a packaged cabinet at his place and asks him to take care of it. He later discovers it's something deadly. At the same time, a young journalist who has heard of his isolation comes to interview him. They hit it off while he constantly tries to keep her from seeing the package.

Trouble ensues when the neighbour, the package, the journalist, everything comes crashing down all at once.

== Cast ==
- Ali Fazal as Karan, a man in a self-imposed house arrest
- Shriya Pilgaonkar as Saira, the journalist
- Jim Sarbh as Jamshed Daneja (JD), Karan's best friend
- Barkha Singh as Pinky, Karan's friend who gives him a package for safekeeping
- Sunil Kumar as Rambo, Pinky's bodyguard
