= Ishq-e-Nadaan =

2023 Indian drama film

- Official release poster
- Directed by: Avishek Ghosh
- Written by: Sudeep Nigam
- Produced by: Jyoti Deshpande; Avishek Ghosh
- Starring: Lara Dutta; Neena Gupta; Shriya Pilgaonkar; Suhail Nayyar; Mohit Raina; Kanwaljeet Singh
- Cinematography: Gairik Sarkar
- Edited by: Dnyanada Samarth
- Music by: Raja Narayan Deb; Gulraj Singh
- Production companies: Jio Studios; AVMA Media
- Distributed by: JioCinema
- Release date: 14 July 2023
- Running time: 106 minutes
- Country: India
- Language: Hindi

Ishq-e-Nadaan (transl. Innocent Love) is a 2023 Indian Hindi-language romantic drama film directed by Avishek Ghosh on his directorial debut. It stars Lara Dutta, Neena Gupta, Shriya Pilgaonkar, Mohit Raina, Kanwaljeet Singh, Suhail Nayyar and Mrinal Dutt with an ensemble cast.

The film premiered directly at JioCinema on 14 July 2023.

== Plot ==
"The heartwarming romance story, situated in a bustling city, follows the experiences of its characters through friendship and unwavering love." The film is a culmination of three parallel stories with the common theme of unconventional love and Mumbai city itself.

A luxury hotel front-desk staff, Ashutosh, is a single father who falls in love for a successful businesswoman, Ramona, who frequently stays in the hotel. Even though his new developing feelings don't find reciprocation, as Ramona turned out to be lesbian and was using the hotel to secretly meet her lover, Ashutosh understands there situation and encourages Ramona to be more open about her love to the world. Between all this, he applies for a lucky draw organised by the hotel chain and wins a trip to Rome to try Gelato and see if life still has any surprise left for him.

The second story is of a pregnant girl, Siya, who returns to Mumbai from US after leaving her partner and architecture firm based job. She stumbles upon Piyush, a well mannered boy, and his mother after fainting due to pregnancy and Mumbai heat . He goes for arranged dates every weekend and gets rejected, when he tells how he is frustrated with the rat-race of corporate life and would be happy to be a house husband. With time, Siya and Piyush get closer and he proposes. The father of the child arrives and some misunderstandings take place. Eventually, she gets in labour and both the guys come to the hospital. The conflict resolves and she and Piyush stay together.

The third story is of an old woman, Charulata from Indore who visits her daughter in Mumbai, and finds a eccentric filmmaker, Subhash residing in the same complex. Initially hesitant by his behaviour, she gradually starts enjoying his company. She shares to him that once she visited Rome with her husband and met a man, whom she shared everything in her heart in a cafe. Even though they never meet again, she continues to receive a poem from him every year on her birthday. Convinced by Subhash, she sets on to find the man, who she learns has died four years ago and instructed her daughter to continue sending the letters.

The stories connect in a way such that Ashutosh was that man who sent the poems after his trip to Rome to Charulata, and his daughter grew up to be the pregnant girl from the second story, Siya.

== Cast ==
- Lara Dutta as Ramona Singh
- Neena Gupta as Charulata
- Shriya Pilgaonkar as Siya
- Mohit Raina as Ashutosh
- Suhail Nayyar as Piyush
- Kanwaljeet Singh as Subhash Kapoor
- Mrinal Dutt as Raghav
- Samvedna Suwalka as Meenakshi Acharya
- Anshu Varshney
- Deepika Amin as Rekha
- Gaurav Sharma as Mahesh Acharya
- Pankhuri Gidwani
- Manmeet Singh Sawhney as Satpal Singh

== Production ==
The film started in 2021 and was wrapped in June 2022.
