= Aai Kuthe Kay Karte! =

Indian Marathi television series

- Genre: Drama
- Developed by: Leena Gangopadhyay
- Written by: Mugdha Godbole
- Story by: Magic Moments Motion Pictures
- Directed by: Ravindra Karmakar
- Starring: Madhurani Gokhale
- Opening theme: Aarya Ambekar
- Composer: Avadhoot Gupte
- Country of origin: India
- Original language: Marathi
- No. of episodes: 1491

Production
- Producer: Rajan Shahi
- Cinematography: Rajesh Mohite
- Editor: Hemant Talawadekar
- Camera setup: Multi-camera
- Running time: 22 minutes
- Production company: Director's Kut Productions

Original release
- Network: Star Pravah
- Release: 23 December 2019 – 30 November 2024

Related
- Sreemoyee

Aai Kuthe Kay Karte! (transl. What Does a Mother Ever Do!) is an Indian Marathi-language drama series airing on Star Pravah. It is based on the Bengali series Sreemoyee. The show premiered on 23 December 2019 and ended its 4-year run on 30 November 2024. One of the longest running Marathi television soap opera, the series starred Madhurani Gokhale in the title role of Arundhati. The show is produced by Rajan Shahi's Director's Kut Productions.

== Plot ==
A middle-aged housewife, Arundhati, has dedicated her life to her husband and children. Her husband Anirudh has an affair with his colleague, Sanjana. Arundhati's elder son, Abhishek marries Ankita while her younger son, Yash falls in love with Sanjana's niece, Gauri.

Arundhati's friend, Devika tells her that her family takes her for granted. The family plans a remarriage of Arundhati and Anirudh, to mark their 25th anniversary. Sanjana tries to marry Anirudh on his wedding day with Arundhati but in vain. In anger, she comes to tell Arundhati the truth about her and Anirudh's affair on their wedding day. However, Anirudh stops her and expresses his love for her in his bedroom and Arundhati sees. Arundhati breaks down and decides to retaliate against Anirudh for his betrayal.

Arundhati changes herself and learns all the things that she remains to learn. Soon, Anirudh and Sanjana's relationship is exposed to the Deshmukh family, while Anirudh proposes to Sanjana on her birthday. The Deshmukhs blame Anirudh, who later moves to Sanjana's house. Later, Arundhati's daughter, Isha becomes depressed, which makes Anirudh return to his family.

Anirudh and Arundhati finally get divorced. Sanjana divorces Shekhar and marries Anirudh. Sanjana continuously taunts Arundhati, trying to humiliate her and fails in her attempts to turn the family against her. Arundhati's college friend, Ashutosh, enters and gives Arundhati moral support. Abhishek divorces Ankita and decides to marry his fiancée, Anagha. But before their marriage Anagha's obsessive lover, Girish, arrives and disrupts their lives, but Yash goes to try to get him to stop, later coming to fist blows. He even attempts Yash, Anagha and Arundhati's murders but is caught in the act by Ashutosh. The couple gets married. Later Arundhati leaves the Samridhhi Mansion due to repetitive character assassination by Kanchan, Aniruddh, Abhishek and Sanjana while Yash also decides to leave with her. They move to a rented house while Sanjana tricks everyone into signing property papers on her name.

This action of Sanjana causes a lot of rift in her and Anirudh's relationship. Anirudh wants to divorce Sanjana, but he is unable to do so. Anirudh's true face comes out to Sanjana, while the Deshmukh family stands firmly behind Sanjana and Sanjana realizes her mistakes, she supports Arundhati.

Later Anagha gets pregnant and gives birth to a girl whom the family name Janaki ("Chakuli"). The family learns about Abhishek's extra marital affair but forgive him later when he reforms himself. Isha and Anish (Ashutosh's nephew) fall in love. Arundhati and Ashutosh realise their love for each other and decide to get married. Anirudh tries everything to break Arundhati's marriage, but all of his efforts go in vain and finally Arundhati and Ashutosh get married happily.

== Cast ==
=== Main ===
- Madhurani Gokhale as Arundhati Kelkar (née Joglekar) – Vidya's daughter; (2019–2024)
- Omkar Govardhan as Ashutosh "Ashu" Kelkar – Sulekha's son; (2021–2024) (Dead)
- Milind Gawali as Aniruddh Deshmukh – Vinayak and Kanchan's elder son; (2019–2024)
- Deepali Pansare/Rupali Bhosale as Sanjana Deshmukh – Rajni's sister; (2019–2020) / (2020–2024)

=== Recurring ===
- Abhishek Deshmukh as Yash Deshmukh – Arundhati and Aniruddh's younger son; (2019–2024)
- Kaumudi Walokar as Aarohi Deshmukh – Yash's wife; (2023–2024)
- Gauri Kulkarni as Gauri Karkhanis – Rajni's daughter; (2020–2023)
- Ashwini Mahangade as Anagha Deshmukh – Asha and Pradeep's daughter; (2020–2024)
- Niranjan Kulkarni as Dr. Abhishek "Abhi" Deshmukh – Arundhati and Aniruddh's elder son; (2019–2024)
- Apurva Gore as Isha Deshmukh Kelkar – Arundhati and Aniruddh's daughter; (2019–2024)
- Sumant Thakre as Anish Kelkar – Vijay and Vineeta's son; (2023–2024)
- Kishore Mahabole as Vinayak "Appa" Deshmukh – Kanchan's husband; (2019–2024)
- Archana Patkar as Kanchan "Ajji" Deshmukh – Tatya and Sulu's sister; (2019–2024)
- Twisha Ayare/Janki Kalekar as Janaki "Chakuli" Deshmukh – Anagha and Abhishek's daughter (2022–2023) / (2023–2024)
- Jaanvi Harisinghani as Manasvi "Manu" Kelkar – Maya's daughter; (2023–2024)
- Poonam Chandokar as Vishakha Deshmukh – Vinayak and Kanchan's daughter; (2020–2024)
- Ashish Kulkarni as Kedar – Vishaka's husband (2020–2024)
- Shantanu Moghe as Avinash Deshmukh – Vinayak and Kanchan's younger son; (2021–2022)
- Sheetal Kshirsagar as Nilima Deshmukh – Avinash's estranged wife (2020–2021)

=== Others ===
- Ila Bhate as Sulekha Kelkar – Ashutosh and Veena's mother; (2021–2024)
- Khushboo Tawde as Veena Kelkar – Ashutosh's sister; (2023)
- Hitendra Upasani as Vijay Kelkar – Ashutosh and Veena's cousin; (2023)
- Rasikraj as Nitin Shah – Arundhati and Ashutosh's business partner and friend (2021–2024)
- Leena Athavale Datar as Vineeta Kelkar – Vijay's wife; (2023)
- Seema Ghogale as Vimal – Deshmukh's domestic help (2019–2024)
- Radha Kulkarni as Dr. Ankita Kulkarni – Revati and Pramod's daughter; (2019–2022)
- Advait Kadne as Sahil Salvi – Isha's ex-fiance (2020–2022)
- Medha Jambotkar as Vidya Joglekar – Arundhati and Sudhir's mother; (2019–2024)
- Kedar Shirsekar as Sudhir Joglekar – Vidya's son; (2020–2024)
- Mayur Khandage as Shekhar Dixit – Sanjana's ex-husband; (2020–2022)
- Parth as Nikhil Dixit – Sanjana and Shekhar's son; (2020–2021; 2023)
- Sushma Murudekar as Rajni Karkhanis – Sanjana's sister; (2020–2021)
- Pooja Pawar/Reshma Polekar as Revati Kulkarni – Pramod's wife; (2019–2020)
- Sanjay Kshemkalyani as Pramod Kulkarni – Revati's husband; (2019–2020)
- Radhika Deshpande as Devika – Arundhati's best friend (2020–2024)
- Ragini Samant as Sulu – Kanchan and Tatya's sister (2019–2020)
- Jayant Savarkar as Tatya – Kanchan and Sulu's brother (2020)
- Mugdha Godbole-Ranade as Vasudha Sardesai – Arundhati's gynecologist; (2020–2021)
- Swarangi Marathe as Anushka – Ashutosh's friend (2022–2023)
- Akshaya Gurav as Maya – Manasvi's mother (2024)
- Rishi Saxena as Mihir Sharma (2024)

=== Cameo appearance ===
- Nilesh Moharir as himself. He recorded Arundhati's first commercial song produced by Ashutosh (2022)
- Paras Kalnawat as Samar Shah, Guest appearance from Anupamaa (2020)
- Rupali Ganguly as Anupamaa, Guest appearance from Anupamaa, Arundhati's Friend (2020)

== Production ==
=== Development ===
Rajan Shahi, who produces the series, decided to remake it in Hindi as Anupamaa for StarPlus stating, "This interesting concept around a mother's journey has been so inspirational that Star wants to bring it in Hindi too."

The production and broadcasting of the series was halted in late March 2020 due to the COVID-19 pandemic in India. After more than 3 months, the filming resumed in late June 2020 and the broadcast resumed on 13 July 2020. On 13 April 2021, Chief Minister of Maharashtra, Uddhav Thackeray announced a sudden curfew due to increased Covid cases, while the production halted from 14 April 2021 in Mumbai. Hence, the production location was soon shifted temporarily to Silvassa.

=== Casting ===
Madhurani Gokhale is cast as the lead role. Milind Gawali, Gauri Kulkarni, Deepali Pansare, Rupali Bhosale, Mayur Khandage, Kishore Mahabole, Archana Patkar, Poonam Chandokar, Apurva Gore, Seema Ghogale, Abhishek Deshmukh, Niranjan Kulkarni, Ashish Kulkarni and Radha Kulkarni were also cast. It was post COVID-19 pandemic lockdown when production resumed in June 2020. Deepali Pansare quit the series because of the pandemic and was replaced by Rupali Bhosale. In November 2021, Omkar Govardhan entered the show as the new main lead Ashutosh Kelkar.

== Reception ==
In November 2020 and December 2020, the show was one of the most watched Indian Marathi television programs.
