= Vimal Khanna =

2026 Indian thriller TV series

- Promotional poster
- Genre: Survival; Thriller
- Based on: Vimal Series by Surender Mohan Pathak
- Written by: Uddeept Dutt Gaur
- Story by: Surender Mohan Pathak
- Directed by: Abhhinav Pareek
- Starring: Sunny Hinduja; Isha Talwar
- Composer: Vikaas Vishwakarma
- Country of origin: India
- Original language: Hindi
- No. of seasons: 1
- No. of episodes: 9

Production
- Executive producer: Mohit Bhagat
- Producer: Piyush Dinesh Gupta
- Cinematography: Subhransu Das
- Editor: Kamesh Karna
- Production company: NMKH Productions

Original release
- Network: Amazon MX Player
- Release: 15 May 2026

Vimal Khanna is a 2026 Indian Hindi-language crime thriller television series adapted from Vimal series by author Surender Mohan Pathak. It is directed by Abhhinav Pareek and written by Uddeept Dutt Gaur for Amazon MX Player. It stars Sunny Hinduja in the titular role alongside Isha Talwar.

== Cast ==
- Sunny Hinduja as Vimal Khanna
- Isha Talwar as Amrita Das
- Tara Alisha Berry as Jyoti
- Akshay Anand as Nishant Das
- Piloo Vidyarthi as Martha
- Palle Singh as Roshan
- Mahir Pandhi as Bosco
- Surjasikha Das as Alice
- Shakti Singh as Dr. Kashyap
- Sonnal Singh as Shalini
- Suyash Kukreia
- Lagan Maheswari as Arushi, Daughter of Nishant
- Vinodh Suryawanshi as Raja Rao aka Anna

== Episodes ==
No.	Title	Directed by	Written by	Original release date
1	"Kismat Ka Khel"	Abhhinav Pareek	Uddeept Dutt Gaur	15 May 2026
2	"Kastaa Shikanjaa"	Abhhinav Pareek	Uddeept Dutt Gaur	15 May 2026
3	"Kuch Raaz"	Abhhinav Pareek	Uddeept Dutt Gaur	15 May 2026
4	"Chakravyuh"	Abhhinav Pareek	Uddeept Dutt Gaur	15 May 2026
5	"Aur Phir Achanak"	Abhhinav Pareek	Uddeept Dutt Gaur	15 May 2026
6	"Bhoot Aur Vartmaan"	Abhhinav Pareek	Uddeept Dutt Gaur	15 May 2026
7	"Makadjaal"	Abhhinav Pareek	Uddeept Dutt Gaur	15 May 2026
8	"Shikar Ya Shikari"	Abhhinav Pareek	Uddeept Dutt Gaur	15 May 2026
9	"Maut Ka Khel"	Abhhinav Pareek	Uddeept Dutt Gaur	15 May 2026

== Release ==
Vimal Khanna began streaming on Amazon MX Player from 15 May 2026.

== Reception ==
Abhishek Srivastava of The Times of India gave 3 stars out of 5 and said that "‘Vimal Khanna’ Season One settles into being an average but watchable thriller because it often chooses surface-level storytelling over layered elements. It delivers enough suspense and a dependable central performance to satisfy viewers looking for an uncomplicated crime drama, though it rarely aims higher than that."
