= Saare Jahan Se Accha (2025 TV series) =

- Promotional poster
- Created by: Gaurav Shukla
- Written by: Bhavesh Mandalia; Gaurav Shukla; Meghna Srivastava; Abhijeet Khuman; Shivam Shankar; Kunal Kushwah; Ishraq Shah
- Directed by: Sumit Purohit
- Starring: Pratik Gandhi; Sunny Hinduja; Suhail Nayyar; Kapil Radha; Kritika Kamra; Tillotama Shome; Rajat Kapoor; Anup Soni
- Music by: Ketan Sodha
- Country of origin: India
- Original languages: Hindi; Urdu; Punjabi
- No. of seasons: 1
- No. of episodes: 6

Production
- Producer: Bombay Fables
- Cinematography: Dmytro Nedria; Debojeet Ray; Jay I. Patel
- Editor: Aarif Sheikh

Original release
- Network: Netflix
- Release: 13 August 2025

Saare Jahan Se Accha is an Indian Hindi-language action thriller spy television series created by Gaurav Shukla. The series was developed by Netflix and released on 13 August 2025. A resilient Indian spy must defeat his counterpart across the border in Pakistan, in a battle of wits and tradecraft to sabotage its nuclear program.

== Plot ==
In 1960s, after India has endured two conflicts within a space of five years, renowned Indian nuclear physicist, Dr. Homi J. Bhabha, makes a public statement advocating India to become a nuclear power. This draws the attention of the CIA, which begins covert operations to sabotage India's nuclear program.

A junior operative in Indian Intelligence Bureau, Vishnu Shankar uncovers the classified details about Bhabha's travel plans having been leaked to American agents, he races to thwart an impending assassination plot. Despite his efforts, Bhabha dies when his flight to Geneva explodes in 1966, effectively stalling India's nuclear program. This event leads to creation of Research & Analysis Wing, India's specialised espionage organisation in enemy territories, headed by R. N. Kao.

In 1972, in the aftermath of the Shimla Agreement, Pakistan's Prime Minister Zulfikar Ali Bhutto decides to scale up his country's nuclear program. Kao gets this intelligence from his counterpart in Mossad, and sends his intelligence officer, Vishnu Shankar to Islamabad on a covert mission to sabotage Pakistan's nuclear program. Once in Islamabad, Vishnu gets to work in finding out where Pakistan is building its nuclear facilities.

Meanwhile, Murtaza Malik, head of ISI, has taken on the task of cleaning out foreign secret operatives in Pakistan. He is brother-in-law and colleague of brigadier Naushad Ahmed, a high ranking official in the Pakistani Army. Naushad is an informant to R&AW under duress, and supplies the crucial information to Vishnu Shankar that Pakistan is buying nuclear reactors instead of creating them from scratch as previously assumed. Soon after, Naushad is caught and killed by Murtaza.

Naushad's intel changes the focus of Vishnu's mission to tracking down who Pakistan is buying the reactors from. Through his covert operatives, Sukhbir (operating under the false identity of Karachi Stock Trader, Rafiq) and Vikram operating in Paris, he figures out that Pakistan is making secret payments to a French company, HGN, to secure these reactors. Vikram, collaborates with his Mossad counterpart, Maria, and two other R&AW agents in Paris to track and murder the ISI agent in charge overseeing these payments.

In Islamabad, Vishnu seeks to fill the void left by Naushad's death. He recruits Fatima Khan, the Editor of Haqeeqat newspaper who is critical of the ongoing regime and is the niece of Munir Khan, the nuclear physicist leading Pakistan's nuclear mission. With Fatima's intel, Vishnu obtains the time and location of the incoming shipment from France that contains disassembled nuclear reactor, and blows up the ship, losing four Indian agents and several Pakistani soldiers in the process.

The end credits chronicle that India tested its first nuclear weapon shortly afterwards, in 1974, and Pakistan in 1998 - 24 years later.

== Cast ==
- Pratik Gandhi as Vishnu P. Shankar, under official cover senior R&AW officer working at High Commission of India, Islamabad
- Sunny Hinduja as Ali Murtaza Malik, Director-General of ISI, Pakistan
- Rajat Kapoor as R. N. Kao, Secretary of R&AW, India
- Suhail Nayyar as Sukhbir/Rafiq, R&AW agent, disguised as a stock broker in Pakistan
- Tillotama Shome as Mohini Shankar née Nath, Vishnu's wife
- Ninad Kamat as Nirmal Raibhan Adhikari, R&AW officer at High Commission of India, Islamabad
- Kritika Kamra as Fatima Khan, editor journalist at Haqeeqat Newspaper, Pakistan
- Anup Soni as Brigadier Naushad Javed Ahmed, Pakistan Army, brother in law of Ali Murtaza
- Nakul Roshan Sahdev as Ghulam
- Atul Kumar as Munir Ahmad Khan, Pakistani nuclear physicist working on making of Pakistan's first atomic bomb
- Kunal Mann as Junaid Bawa
- Hemant Kher as Zulfikar Ali Bhutto, President and Prime Minister of Pakistan
- Rajesh Khera as Bilal Jahangir Baweja, arms dealer for the ISI, Pakistani in the UK
- Scott Alexander Young as Henry Kissinger, 56th United States Secretary of State
- Satyen Chaturvedi as Brotherly Leader Colonel Muammar Gaddafi, Ruler of Libya
- Vivek Tandon as Homi Jehangir Bhabha, Indian Nuclear Physicist
- Kunal Thakur as Vikram Sarabhai, Indian Physicist
- Avantika Akerkar as Prime Minister Indira Gandhi
- Tibor Kákonyi as Ben Adler, Director of Mossad
- Stephanie Schlesser as Marya, a Mossad agent, supporting a group of agents of R&AW in Paris
- Kunal Thakur as Vikram, a R&AW agent in Paris
- Diksha Juneja as Naseem Q. Siddiqui
- Kapil Radha as Rizwan Ahmad Anwar

== Production ==
The series features several true events in its storyline during the nuclear tensions between Indian and Pakistan in 1960s and 1970s, including:

- Dr. Homi J. Bhabha's claims to build India's nuclear weapons within 18 months and his death in a plane crash in 1966, and the allegations of assassination.
- Creation of R&AW in 1968.
- The Shimla Agreement in 1972.
- Zulfikar Ali Bhutto's establishment of Project 706, which brought over several Pakistani nuclear physicists living abroad including Munir Ahmad Khan.

== Reception ==
Deepa Gahlot of Rediff.com gave 3.5 stars and observed that "The always dependable Pratik Gandhi finds a match in Sunny Hinduja and they are surrounded by a top notch supporting cast." Shubhra Gupta of The Indian Express gave 2.5 stars out of 5 and said that "The best thing about the handsomely-mounted show is that it steers clear of vicious jingoism while waving the flag. You wish it didn’t peter off towards the end." Lachmi Deb Roy of Firstpost rated 3.5/5 stars and said that "The show may be wanting in many departments, but it mostly gets everything right and that’s what makes it a must-watch."

Anuj Kumar of The Hindu observed that "Despite strong performances and a powerful premise, the six-episode espionage drama ‘Saare Jahan Se Accha’ feels like a mission that has been compromised." Rashmi Vasudeva of Deccan Herald rated it 3/5 stars and said that "It has got quite the perfectly-timed release. Although far from perfect, it is atmospheric in parts and largely engaging." Sana Farzeen of India Today gave 3.5 stars outof 5 and said that "In the end, 'Saare Jahan Se Accha' works because it's not the story of any James Bond but regular-looking, Indian family men, who believe serving their country is their only duty. It also understands that espionage is not just about pointing guns or indulging in mindless killings."

Rahul Desai of The Hollywood Reporter India commeneted that "The six-episode spy thriller is compromised by its own mixed identity". Shreyanka Mazumdar of News 18 rated 3.5/5 stars and said that "A sharp, edge-of-the-seat political thriller driven by powerhouse performances. You will want to watch it in one go." Aishwarya Vasudevan of OTT Play rated 2.5/5 stars and said that "Saare Jahan Se Accha boasts strong performances by Pratik Gandhi and Sunny Hinduja, but safe execution, predictable plot, & lack of real thrills keep this espionage drama from reaching its potential."

Dhaval Roy of The Times of India gave 3.5 stars out of 5 and commented that "The spy drama is a must-watch for its pulse-pounding tension, taut narrative, and stellar performances that leave a lasting impression." Subhash K Jha of News 24 gave rated it 2/5 stars and said that "Everyone tries to look involved and busy. But the lame execution of the plot fells any lofty aspirations. The lack of funds is visible everywhere: Islamabad looks like Chandni Chowk on a dry day." Nandini Ramnath of Scroll.in observed that "Saare Jahan Se Accha goes into fantasy mode at times to assert RAW’s Mossad-like prowess. The factor of doubt over the human cost of espionage survives the imperative to show Pakistan on the back foot yet again."
