= Nikita Roy =

2025 Indian film by Kussh S. Sinha

- Theatrical release poster
- Directed by: Kussh S. Sinha
- Written by: Pavan Kirpalani
- Produced by: Nicky Bhagnani; Vicky Bhagnani; Prakash Bijlani; Kinjal Ghone; Dinesh Gupta; Ankur Takrani
- Starring: Sonakshi Sinha; Paresh Rawal; Arjun Rampal; Suhail Nayyar
- Cinematography: Anshul Chobey
- Edited by: Ritesh Soni
- Music by: Abhinav Shekhar; Rameez Sohail
- Production companies: Nicky Vicky Bhagnani Films; Kratos Entertainment; Nikita Pai Films LTD
- Release date: 18 July 2025
- Running time: 112 minutes
- Country: India
- Language: Hindi

Nikita Roy is a 2025 Indian Hindi-language mystery horror film directed by Kussh S. Sinha in his directorial debut. The film stars Sonakshi Sinha in the titular role alongside Paresh Rawal, Arjun Rampal, and Suhail Nayyar. The film was released theatrically on 18 July 2025. Nikita Roy did not recoup its budget and is considered a box office failure. Critical reviews of the film were mixed.

== Plot ==
Nikita Roy is a celebrated author and rationalist based in London. She is a member of the International Rationalist Committee (IRC) and specializes in debunking myths, superstitions, and "godmen." Her brother, Sanal Roy, is her mentor and a fellow rationalist who is investigating a powerful spiritual guru named Amar Dev.

Sanal goes missing while investigating Amar Dev's cult, the "Tru Faith Foundation." He is eventually found dead, and the police rule it a suicide. Nikita refuses to believe her brother—a man of logic and science—would kill himself. She is convinced Amar Dev murdered him to protect his secrets.

Nikita arrives in London to take over Sanal's investigation. She is aided by Jolly , her ex-boyfriend and fellow investigator. Amar Dev is a calm, menacing figure who claims to heal people by absorbing their "darkness." When Nikita confronts him, he issues a challenge: If she can prove he is a fraud within a specific timeframe (often cited as a few days/a week), he will surrender. If not, she will face the consequences of her skepticism. As Nikita digs deeper, her reliance on logic begins to crumble. She starts experiencing unexplainable, paranormal events—visions of her brother, eerie noises, and shadowy figures. She tracks down an informant named Freya, who was a mole inside the cult, but Freya commits suicide in a gruesome manner right in front of them, seemingly driven mad by a "curse."

In the finale, Nikita confronts Amar Dev at his ashram. The film reveals that Sanal didn't just die; he was psychologically broken by Amar Dev's methods. Nikita finds herself falling into the same "trap" as her brother, a mix of hallucinations and reality distortion engineered by the cult. Nikita sought to expose the "Book of Darkness" (the metaphorical or literal secrets of the cult), the darkness (fear and irrationality) consumed her just as it did her brother. The film closes with the unsettling idea that faith—or the manipulation of it—can be more powerful than logic.

== Cast ==
- Sonakshi Sinha as Nikita Roy
- Paresh Rawal as Amar Dev
- Arjun Rampal as Sanal Roy
- Suhail Nayyar as Jolly
- Kallirroi Tziafeta as Freya
- Supreet Bedi as Tina
- Kumall Grewal as Krishnan
- Paul Coster as Inspector Brian
- Beau Baptist as Inspector James
- Adi Chugh as Sameer; IRC member
- Calin Bleau as Luca
- Zara Zaidi as Rosemary

== Production ==
The film marks the directorial debut of Kussh Sinha, son of actor Shatrughan Sinha and brother of Sonakshi Sinha, who also plays the lead role. The project was announced in 2022 and was filmed primarily in the United Kingdom, including locations in Watford, Hertfordshire.

== Soundtrack ==
Nikita Roy

Soundtrack album by Abhinav Shekhar and Rameez Sohail
- Released: 17 July 2025
- Genre: Feature film soundtrack
- Length: 13:45
- Language: Hindi
- Label: Saregama

Official audio
- Nikita Roy Full Album on YouTube

The music of the film is composed by Abhinav Shekhar and Rameez Sohail while lyrics are written by Abhinav Shekhar and Kaushik Vikas.

Track listing
No.	Title	Singer(s)	Length
1.	"Kaali Raatein"	Abhinav Shekhar, Pratiksha Vashishtha	2:37
2.	"Soona Soona"	Saumya Upadhyay	3:24
3.	"Satyamev Jayate"	Abhinav Shekhar, Pallavi Chaudhary, Saumya Upadhyay, Arth Kumaa	3:25
4.	"Sun Sada" (Music by Rameez Sohail and lyrics by Kaushik Vikas)	Javed Ali	3:19
5.	"Soona Soona" (Unplugged)	Saumya Upadhyay	1:00
Total length:			13:45

== Release ==
It was theatrically released in India on 18 July 2025.

== Reception ==
=== Critical response ===
Vinamra Mathur from Firstpost gave the film 2 stars out of 5, stating the film reeked of pretence from beginning to end, and the potential in the story was further marred by fake accents and faulty dubbing.

Sarika Sharma of Moneycontrol gave 3/5 stars, appreciating its attempt to explore the clash between rationalism and superstition. She wrote, "Sonakshi Sinha carries the film with conviction, and the atmospheric cinematography creates a haunting vibe. Yet, the narrative feels rushed, leaving some emotional beats underdeveloped."

Renuka Vyavahare of The Times of India awarded the film 3/5 stars, stating, "The film’s strength lies in its restrained approach to the horror-thriller genre, avoiding clichés of mainstream Bollywood. However, the hurried investigation sequences and lack of character depth prevent it from reaching its full potential. A decent watch for fans of mystery and suspense."

Bollywood Hungama gave the film 1.5 stars out of 5, remarking that while the original story and adapted story held a lot of promise, the screenplay was lackluster and the direction was not up to the mark.
