= Ella (film) =

Indian thriller mystery film

- Theatrical release poster
- Directed by: Roshan Fernandes
- Written by: Roshan Fernandes
- Produced by: Prateek Shetty; Kishore Kumar Puttur; Wolsey Tauro; Uday Kumar Shetty
- Starring: Isha Talwar; Makarand Deshpande
- Cinematography: Jerin James
- Edited by: Shantanu Dutt
- Music by: B. Ajaneesh Loknath
- Release date: 8 November 2024
- Country: India
- Language: Hindi

Ella is a Hindi thrilling mystery film directed by Roshan Fernandes, marking his directorial debut. The film stars Isha Talwar, Makarand Deshpande, Manish Sharma, and Joy Bhattacharya in pivotal roles. The story follows a nine-year-old girl named Ella, who goes missing while searching for her pet, leading her through a world of danger, crime, and supernatural elements. The film was released on 8 November 2024.

== Plot summary ==
The story revolves around a nine-year-old girl named Ella, who goes missing under mysterious circumstances. Her journey to find her beloved pet, a star tortoise, leads her through a world filled with danger, crime, and supernatural elements. Ella's resilience and determination to save her pet form the heart of the narrative.

== Cast ==
=== Main cast ===
- Isha Talwar as Ella
- Makarand Deshpande as a police officer
- Manish Sharma
- Joy Bhattacharya

=== Supporting cast ===
- Saranya Sharma as a mystic
- Shivangi Mehra
- Riya Chanda
- Vikram Shetty
- Jainish Mehta
- Thammana Shetty
- Shakeel Sayni
- Mahil Singh
- Sharan Bhat
- Joy Bhattacharya
- Barkha Saxena

== Production ==
The story of Ella was conceptualized in 2019, with initial plans to shoot in Goa and Mumbai. Due to financial constraints, director Roshan Fernandes faced delays in moving forward with the project. By the time production was set to begin, crowdfunding was no longer feasible. Fernandes, along with filmmaker Basil Alchalakkal and other collaborators, changed the filming locations to Mulki, Udupi, and Mangaluru. The shooting was originally scheduled in two phases. However, after completing over half of the film, production was halted by the COVID-19 pandemic, delaying the final phase by nearly two years. The team resumed and completed the film after pandemic restrictions were lifted.

== Critical reception ==
Sushmita Dey of Times Now awarded the film 3 out of 5 stars, highlighting "its unexpected twists, emotional depth, and eerie atmosphere as key elements that make it an engaging watch, particularly for fans of crime and supernatural mysteries."

Film Information reviewed the movie, stating that "Roshan Fernandes’ direction is ordinary. B. Ajaneesh Loknath's music and background score are nothing to dance about. Mandar Pathak's lyrics are okay. Jerin James does an average job of the camerawork. Chetan Kulal and Yash Acharya's art direction is functional. Shantanu Dutt's editing is loose."

Jyothi Venkatesh of Cine Blitz also gave the film 3 out of 5 stars and noted that as a "newbie filmmaker, with no backing, this was the best start possible for Roshan." She added, "As far as the performances of the actors in the film, all I can say is that Saranya Sharma has lived her difficult role of the eight-year-old smart little Ella while Makarand Deshpande has done more than ample justice to his role as the mentor of Ella. As the grown-up Ella, Isha Talwar does well."
