= Isha Talwar =

Indian actress (born 1987)

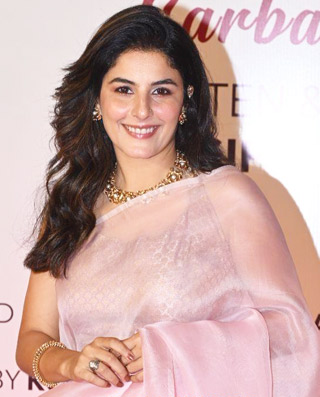
- Talwar in 2024
- Born: 22 December 1987 (age 38); Mumbai, Maharashtra, India
- Education: St. Xavier's College, Mumbai
- Occupation: Actress
- Years active: 2012–present

Isha Talwar (born 22 December 1987) is an Indian actress who predominantly works in Malayalam and Hindi films. Talwar started her career as a model, and made her film debut with the Malayalam film Thattathin Marayathu (2012), winning SIIMA Award for Best Female Debut – Malayalam. She is known for her role in Gunde Jaari Gallanthayyinde (2013), Bangalore Days (2014), Maine Pyar Kiya (2014) and Article 15 (2019). Talwar is also known for her portrayal in the series Mirzapur (2020-present), Saas, Bahu Aur Flamingo (2023) and Indian Police Force (2024).

== Early life and background ==
Isha Talwar was born on 22 December 1987 to film director Vinod Talwar and Suman. She was born and brought up in Mumbai, and is a graduate in Economics from St. Xavier's College, Mumbai.

Talwar joined choreographer Terence Lewis's dance school in 2004, where she learned various dance forms like ballet, jazz, hip-hop, and salsa and went on to become a tutor in the dance studio. She stated that her choreographer, Terence Lewis, was "one person who changed me completely."

== Career ==
Talwar worked as a model and appeared in more than 40 commercials for brands like Pizza Hut, Vivel Fairness Cream, Kaya Skin Clinic, Dulux Paints, and Dhatri Fairness Cream, besides a music video with Hrithik Roshan for the Just Dance competition. She says she spent two years preparing for her film debut. Although she had worked as a child actress in the 2000 Bollywood film Hamara Dil Aapke Paas Hai, her full-length film debut was with the Malayalam film Thattathin Marayathu, for which she took a four-month voice training class, went through a course to learn the language, and learned to play the guitar. The film which saw her play Aisha, a Muslim girl who falls in love with a Hindu boy, became a blockbuster and was listed by Rediff.com in their "Top five Malayalam films of 2012" list. Critics noted that she "looked beautiful", but had "nothing much to do" in the film. In a later interview, she stated that the role of Aisha had given her "a lot of recognition" and that she was "really happy with" her girl next-door image from the film. Her second film I Love Me by B. Unnikrishnan had her playing the female lead alongside Asif Ali and Unni Mukundan. She said that her character in the film Samantha had "shades of grey".

In 2013, she had two releases – her Telugu debut, Gunde Jaari Gallanthayyinde, which opened to a positive response, and her Tamil debut, Thillu Mullu, a remake of the same-titled 1981 Tamil comedy film which was also a commercial success. In 2014, she was seen in the Malayalam films, Balyakalasakhi, Utsaha Committee, God's Own Country, and Anjali Menon's Bangalore Days. She has shot for an "extended cameo role" in Siddique's Bhaskar the Rascal. She has also been shooting for the Tamil remake of Thattathin Marayathu, reprising her own role. She made her Bollywood debut in the Hindi movie Tubelight alongside Salman Khan. She also appeared alongside Saif Ali Khan in Kaalakaandi. In 2020, she appeared in the Amazon Prime web series Mirzapur. In 2023, she worked on Hotstar web series Saas, Bahu aur Flamingo.

== Media image ==
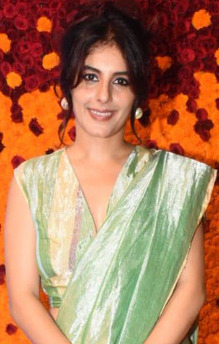
Talwar in 2023

Talwar was named the Kochi Times Most Desirable Women of 2014. In the same list, she was placed 2nd in 2013, 6th in 2015 and 8th in 2018.

== Filmography ==
Key
†	Denotes films that have not yet been released

=== Films ===
Year	Film	Role	Language	Notes
2000	Hamara Dil Aapke Paas Hai	Preeti's youngest sister	Hindi	Child artist
2012	Thattathin Marayathu	Aysha Rehman	Malayalam	Debut film in a leading role
2012	I Love Me	Samantha	Malayalam	
2013	Gunde Jaari Gallanthayyinde	Shruti	Telugu	
2013	Thillu Mullu	Janani	Tamil	
2014	Balyakalasakhi	Suhra	Malayalam	
2014	Ulsaha Committee	Rosemary	Malayalam	
2014	God's Own Country	Asha	Malayalam	
2014	Bangalore Days	Meenakshi	Malayalam	
2014	Maine Pyar Kiya	Shalini	Telugu	
2015	Bhaskar the Rascal	Rani Kabeer	Malayalam	Cameo appearance
2015	Two Countries	Simran	Malayalam	
2016	Raja Cheyyi Vesthe	Chaitra	Telugu	
2016	Meendum Oru Kadhal Kadhai	Aysha	Tamil	
2017	Tubelight	Maya	Hindi	
2017	Crossroad	Gaya Parameshwaran	Malayalam	
2018	Kaalakaandi	Rakhi	Hindi	
2018	Ranam	Seema	Malayalam	
2019	Article 15	Aditi Ranjan	Hindi	
2019	Roam Rome Mein	Parul	Hindi	
2020	Kaamyaab	Isha	Hindi	
2020	Ginny Weds Sunny	Neha Gulati	Hindi	Cameo appearance
2022	Sharmaji Namkeen	Urmi Kaul	Hindi	
2022	Theerppu	Mythili Ram Kumar	Malayalam	
2023	Run Baby Run	Priyanka	Tamil	
2024	Shahkot	Aisha	Punjabi	
2024	Durga	Archana	Odia	
2024	Ella	Ella	Hindi	
2025	Oru Jaathi Jaathakam	Thathri kutty	Malayalam	
2025	Kaushaljis vs Kaushal	Kiara Meena Bansal	Hindi	

=== Television ===
Year	Series	Role	Language	Notes
2010	Rishtey		Hindi	Episode 46: "Itni Chhoti Baat, Itni Lambi Raat"
2011	Just Dance		Hindi	Music video
2014	Comedy Stars	Celebrity judge	Malayalam	
2015	D 4 Dance	Celebrity guest	Malayalam	
2016	Laughing Villa	Guest	Malayalam	
2017	Comedy Super Night 3	Dancer	Malayalam	In the title song
2018	Kasthooriman	Herself	Malayalam	Episode 91, 92, 95, 96
2019	Home Sweet Office	Shagun Agarwal	Hindi	Dice Media, Pocket Aces
2019	Parchhayee	Hameeda	Hindi	ZEE5 originals
2020	Swaha		Hindi	Flipkart
2020	Mirzapur	Madhuri Yadav Tripathi/Madhuri Yadav	Hindi	Amazon Prime Video
2021	Roz Roz	Dancer	Hindi	Sony India
2023	Saas, Bahu Aur Flamingo	Bijli	Hindi	Disney+ Hotstar
2023	Chamak	Jazz	Hindi	SonyLIV
2024	Indian Police Force	Rashmi Malik	Hindi	Amazon Prime Video
2025	Single Papa	Aparna Gehlot	Hindi	Netflix series
2026	Teen Kauwe †	TBA	Hindi	Amazon Prime Video series
2026	Vimal Khanna	Amrita Das	Hindi	Amazon MX Player series

== Awards ==
- 2013: Amrita TV Film Award for Best Pair – Thattathin Marayathu
- 2013: Asiavision Award for New Sensation in Acting – Thattathin Marayathu
- 2013: Indian Movie Award in Qatar For Best Debutant Actress – Thattathin Marayathu
