= Santosh Pawar =

Indian poet, musician, actor, dramatist, theatre director, script writer

Santosh Padmakar Pawar (born 1972) is an Indian poet Marathi language. He is best known for his long poem "Bhramisthacha Jahirnama" from 2005, and for his 2010 play Yadaa Kadachit.

== Biography ==
Santosh Pawar is a teacher and lecturer in Marathi literature. He served as a lecturer in Annasaheb Awate Arts, Commerce & Hutatma Babu Genu Science College.

== Works ==
Pawar's poems have been included in several anthologies, and are also included in the curriculum of several Indian universities. His comedy drama Yadaa Kadachit, based on stories from the Ramayana and the Mahabharata was critically acclaimed. The play was the target of heavy criticism from religious fundamentalist groups who saw it as disrespectful, and who threatened the playwright and the actors, creating violent disturbances during several performances. Yadaa Kadachit nevertheless continued to be a popular play, which had been performed more than 4500 times by 2018.

Pawar has also performed as actor, director, producer and script writer in several movies. He has done designing work for several Bollywood movies like Om Shanti Om, Queen and Thalaivi.

== Awards and recognition ==
- 2022 : Jibanananda Das Award for English translation of Pawar's poetry by Santosh Rathod

== Major works ==
=== Drama scripts ===
- Amhi Saare Lekurwaale
- Jalubhai Halu
- Yadaa Kadachit
- Radha Hi Kabri Babri
- Lage Raho Rajabhai
- Haus Majhi Poorvaa
- Yada Kadachit Returns
- Baap Kunacha Taap Kuna

=== Acting ===
- Navra Maza Navsacha (Movie)
- Fu Bai Fu (Television)
- Ek Unaad Diwas (Drama)
- Tu Tu Mi Mi (Drama)
- Raja Navacha Gulaam (Drama)
- Navra Maza Navsacha 2 (Movie)

=== Direction ===
- Hich Tar Family Chi Gammat Aahe
