= Navra Maza Navsacha =

2004 Indian Marathi slapstick film by Sachin Pilgaonkar

- Directed by: Sachin Pilgaonkar
- Screenplay by: Sachin Pilgaonkar; Santosh Pawar
- Story by: Sachin Pilgaonkar
- Produced by: Sachin Pilgaonkar
- Starring: See below
- Cinematography: Sanjay K. Memane
- Edited by: Aasif Khan
- Music by: Jitendra Kulkarni
- Production company: Kittu Films
- Distributed by: Video Palace
- Release date: 2004
- Running time: 140 minutes
- Country: India
- Language: Marathi
- Budget: ₹80 lakh
- Box office: ₹5 crore

Navra Maza Navsacha is a 2004 Indian Marathi-language slapstick film directed and produced by Sachin Pilgaonkar, is considered as cult classic in Marathi cinema. The film stars Sachin Pilgaonkar, Supriya Pilgaonkar and Ashok Saraf. The film portrays the journey of the couple from Mumbai to Ganpatipule to fulfill a vow.

The plot of the movie is based on the 1972 Hindi film Bombay to Goa, which itself was a remake of 1966 Tamil Film Madras to Pondicherry. The sequel of the film Navra Maza Navsacha 2 was released on 20 September 2024.

== Plot ==
Vakratund (Sachin Pilgaonkar) and Bhakti (Supriya Pilgaonkar) are a couple who have married against Bhakti's parents wishes. Vakratund, also known as Vacky, is an artist but does not have commercial success. Even after 10 years of marriage, the couple is not blessed with children. Bhakti gets to know from Vacky's aunt (Nirmiti Sawant) that Vacky's father had vowed to God that if his child is born healthy, he will bring his child to Ganpatipule naked. This vow was left unfulfilled as Vacky's parents died soon. Bhakti tries to persuade Vacky to go to Ganpati Pule naked, but he does not agree to it. Vacky and his friend Kishore (Atul Parchure) then hire a small time actor as a sage, who advises them to take a mannequin dressed as Vacky secretly in a public transport to Ganapti Pule to fulfill the vow. Vacky and his friend Kishore manage to sneak the mannequin into a state transport bus the previous night of the travel to Ganapati Pule. However, they are unaware that after their departure from the bus at night, an international smuggler named Babu Kaalia (Pradeep Patwardhan) who has just escaped from prison and has stolen diamonds worth 80 crore entered the bus and hid the bag filled with diamonds in a hollow of the mannequin.

Hilarity ensues as the remaining story has the highs and the lows that the couple face while travelling in the bus and the different lives of the passengers, including the bus conductor Lalu (Ashok Saraf) and the bus driver Prasad (Sunil Tawde). However, on reaching Ganpati Pule, they and the passengers are confronted by police as they have an evidence that Babu Kaalia is travelling in the bus to flee to Dubai from Ganpati Pule port. The whole time in the bus from Mumbai to Ganpati Pule, Vacky was drawing the portrait of Babu Kaalia with the help of a fellow passenger (Jaywant Wadkar) who knew Babu Kalia. As soon as they complete the sketch, Babu Kaalia springs up to his true identity and threatens Vacky and passengers for his diamonds or to kill them all. However, Bhakti asks Vacky to take the mannequin to the temple. Vacky reveals that the sage Bhakti met was fake and he had planned this to avoid going naked to Ganpati Pule. However, Vacky still takes away the mannequin to the temple while others run behind him tearing his clothes. By the time he reaches the temple he is completely naked. He completes the vow and the couple are rewarded with 8 crore for catching the gangster and they live happily thereafter.

== Cast ==
- Sachin Pilgaonkar as Vakratund "Vacky" Deshpande
- Supriya Pilgaonkar as Bhakti Vakratund Deshpande
- Ashok Saraf as Bus Conductor Lalu
- Vijay Patkar as Undercover Cop
- Pradeep Patwardhan as Smuggler Babu Kaalia
- Kuldeep Pawar as Police Inspector
- Nirmiti Sawant as Aatya (Vacky's aunt)
- Atul Parchure as Kishore (Vacky's friend)
- Jaywant Wadkar as Snoring passenger
- Vikas Samudre as Chiplun passenger
- Priyanka Mungekar as Chiplun passenger
- Satish Tare as Ughade Baba (Kishore's actor friend)
- Sunil Tawde as Bus Driver Prasad
- Madhurani Gokhale as Video Jockey Candy
- Macchindra Kambli as Master
- Pradeep Kabre as Tamasha group owner
- Vicky Dhaiphule as Passenger without Helmet
- Vaibhav Mangle as Passenger with Helmet
- Chatura Motta as Passenger with Helmet
- Shefali Soman as Mandakini
- Rajan Chincholkar as Mandakini's co-passenger
- Mahesh Subhedar as Army passenger
- Madhavi Dabholkar as Babu Kalia's sidekick
- Sheetal Mhatre as Babu Kalia's second sidekick
- Seema Lad as Picnic passenger
- Madhuri Sinkri as Picnic passenger
- Jay Bendre as Picnic passenger
- Mohan Loke as Elder passenger
- Master Hardik as Helmet passenger's son
- Vinod Kulkarni as Inspector from Konkan Police
- Siddheshwar Zadbuke as Nachya

=== Guest appearances ===
- Reema Lagoo as Sheila Raje
- Johnny Lever as Bahadur; Nepali Passenger
- Kishori Shahane as Dancer Shevanta
- Sonu Nigam as Himself in "Hirwa Nisarg Ha Bhavtine"
- Ali Asgar as Film director
- Vinay Yedekar as Tommy
- Santosh Pawar as Employee on bus depot
- Anand Abhyankar as Priest in Ganesh Mandir

== Production ==
=== Development ===
In 1982, Sachin thought of this film, but he dropped the idea because of the budget. After 21 years, he wanted to make the film again. This time, he asked Santosh Pawar to write the script. The initial title for the film was Chala Na Gade, but later Santosh suggested the title Navra Maza Navsacha.

=== Casting ===
Sachin originally did not choose himself for the role of Vakratund; Bharat Jadhav was selected for the part. Supriya Pilgaonkar was cast for the cameo of Sheila Raje. However, one of Sachin’s friends suggested that both he and Supriya should take the lead roles. As a result, Sachin and Supriya were chosen to play Vakratund and Bhakti, while Reema Lagoo took over the cameo role of Sheila Raje. Ashok Saraf was the first choice for the role of conductor Lalu, and he accepted it. Laxmikant Berde was initially selected for the role of Babu Kalia, but due to his poor health, the role was given to Pradeep Patwardhan. Madhurani Gokhale was chosen for the role of VJ after auditioning. Her character has a brush, which she believes is a microphone. Interestingly, she got that brush from Dadar.

=== Filming ===
The entire film was shot in Konkan. Several portions were shot in Film City and on Kurla bus depot.

== Soundtrack ==
The music composed by Jitendra Kulkarni and lyrics written by Jagdish Khebudkar.

No.	Title	Lyrics	Singer(s)	Length
1.	"Vedshastramaji"	Traditional	Anuradha Paudwal	04:06
2.	"Hirwa Nisarg Ha Bhavtine"	Jagdish Khebudkar	Sonu Nigam	04:53
3.	"Chala Jejurila Jau"	Jagdish Khebudkar	Uttara Kelkar	04:11
4.	"Chala Na Gade"	Jagdish Khebudkar	Anuradha Paudwal; Sachin Pilgaonkar	04:29

== Remakes ==
The film was remade in Kannada as Ekadantha starring Vishnuvardhan, Prema and Ramesh Aravind in the lead roles.
