= Tu Tu Main Main =

Indian television series

- Genre: Sitcom
- Created by: Nirja Guleri
- Written by: Sajeev Kapoor
- Directed by: Sachin Pilgaonkar
- Starring: See below
- Theme music composer: Gaurishankar Sharma
- Opening theme: "Tu Tu Main Main" by Sachin Pilgaonkar
- Country of origin: India
- Original language: Hindi
- No. of episodes: 169

Production
- Executive producers: Shrey Guleri; Sahil Guleri
- Producer: Nirja Guleri
- Cinematography: Randev Bhaduri
- Running time: 24 minutes
- Production company: Prime Channel

Original release
- Network: DD Metro (1994–1995); StarPlus (1996–2000)
- Release: 26 July 1994 – 9 October 2000

Related
- Kadvee Khattee Meethi

Tu Tu Main Main (transl. Squabble) is an Indian television sitcom which originally aired on DD Metro and later StarPlus directed by Sachin Pilgaonkar. The series first premiered on DD Metro in 1994 till 1996 before it moved to StarPlus and the series went on to become the first show to launch the STAR Plus Hindi Band in October 1996.

A sequel series titled Kadvee Khattee Meethi with the same theme and an extended cast, also directed by Sachin, aired on Star One in 2006.

== Plot ==
The story is about the arguments, love and hate between daughter-in-law and mother-in-law. The male lead does a balancing act between mother and wife.

== Cast ==
=== Main ===
- Reema Lagoo as
  - Devki Gopal Verma (Season 1- Tu Tu Main Main)
  - Yashoda Gopal Verma (Season 2- Kadvee Khatee Meethi)
- Supriya Pilgaonkar as
  - Radha Ravi Verma (Season 1- Tu Tu Main Main)
  - Rukmini Sooraj Verma (Season 2- Kadvee Khatee Meethi)
- Mahesh Thakur as
  - Ravi Gopal Verma (Season 1- Tu Tu Main Main)
  - Sooraj Verma (Season 2- Kadvee Khatee Meethi)
- Kuldeep Pawar as
  - Gopal Verma (Season 1- Tu Tu Main Main)
  - Govind Verma (Season 2- Kadvee Khatee Meethi)
- Ali Asgar as Karan Verma (Season 2- Kadvee Khatee Meethi)
- Sucheta Khanna as Madhu Karan Verma (Season 2- Kadvee Khatee Meethi)
- Swapnil Joshi as Arjun Verma (Season 2- Kadvee Khatee Meethi)

=== Recurring ===
- Bhavna Balsavar as Roopa Verma (Season 1- Tu Tu Main Main)
- Shammi as Saasu Ma, Roopa's mother-in-law (Season 1- Tu Tu Main Main)
- Nayantara as Padma Maasi (Season 1- Tu Tu Main Main)
- Jayati Bhatia as
  - Kumud (Season 1- Tu Tu Main Main) - replaced Medha Jambotakar
  - Kusum (Season 2- Kadvee Khatee Meethi)
- Sachin Pilgaonkar as
  - Chandan (Season 1- Tu Tu Main Main)
  - Jinni (Season 2- Kadvee Khatee Meethi)
- Nirmiti Sawant as Prema Buaji (Season 1- Tu Tu Main Main)
- Rekha Rao as various characters (Season 1- Tu Tu Main Main, Season 2- Kadvee Khatee Meethi)
- Vijay Patkar as various characters (Season 1- Tu Tu Main Main, Season 2- Kadvee Khatee Meethi)
- Sudhir as various characters (Season 1- Tu Tu Main Main)

=== Guest appearance ===
- Shubha Khote as Buaji, Gopal's paternal Aunt
- Surbhi Tiwari as Twins
- Rita Bhaduri as Radha's mom
- Resham Tipnis as Guddie
- Sudha Chandran as Sudha: the Dancer
- Rishabh Shukla as Kishan (Lord Krishna)
- Nayana Apte as Kalpana Mausi
- Anirudh Agarwal as Dracula Navela
- Seema Shinde as various characters.
- Suchita Trivedi
- Grusha Kapoor
- Laxmikant Berde
- Rakesh Bedi
- Ashok Saraf
- Neelam Mehra
- Dinesh Hingoo
- Lilliput
- Bharati Achrekar

== See also ==
- List of Hindi comedy shows
