= Suhail Nayyar =

Indian actor (born 1989)

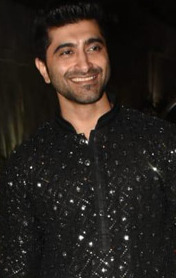
- Nayyar in 2023
- Born: 24 November 1989 (age 36); New Delhi, India
- Education: Films and Television Institute of India
- Occupation: Actor
- Years active: 2016–present

Suhail Nayyar (born 24 November 1989) is an Indian actor who works in hindi films and web series. He started his career with the comedy series Life Sahi Hai and had a supporting role in the acclaimed crime drama film Udta Punjab (2016). Nayyar has since starred in the romantic drama series Jee Karda, the murder mystery film Murder Mubarak (2024) and the action spy series Saare Jahan Se Accha: The Silent Guardians (2025).

== Early life and career ==
Nayyar was born on 24 November 1989 in Delhi, India. Before travelling to Mumbai to pursue a career in acting, he studied film and acting at the Film and Television Institute. He made his debut as a supporting role of Jassi in the crime drama filmUdta Punjab (2016) where his performance as the aforementioned character is "applauded". He made a cameo appearance in Vidyut Jammwal starred Commando 2. Following that, he played Abdullah in Hotel Mumbai, a 2018 American-Australian thriller directed by Anthony Maras and based on the 26/11 Mumbai attacks. About playing Abdullah in Hotel Mumbai, he said, "This is one of the difficult characters I have ever played. The amount of blood and sweat that has gone into creating ‘Abdullah’ is immeasurable". In 2022, he starred as Sandeep Sharma in the comedy drama Sharmaji Namkeen.

In 2025, Nayyar starred in the action spy thriller series Saare Jahan Se Accha: The Silent Guardians as Sukhbir/Rafiq. Writing for The Times of India Dhaval Roy commented that "The spy drama is a must-watch for its pulse-pounding tension, taut narrative, and stellar performances that leave a lasting impression."

== Filmography ==
=== Films ===
Year	Title	Role	Notes	Ref.
2016	Udta Punjab	Jassi		
2017	Commando 2	Dishank Chowdhary	Cameo appearance	
2019	Hotel Mumbai	Abdullah		
2020	Ginny Weds Sunny	Nishant Rathee		
2022	Sharmaji Namkeen	Sandeep "Rinku" Sharma		
2023	Ishq-e-Nadaan	Piyush		
2024	Murder Mubarak	Yash Batra		
2025	Nikita Roy	Jolly Hans		
2026	Udta Teer	Dhruv		

=== Web series ===
Year	Title	Role	Ref.
2016–2018	Life Sahi Hai	Jasjit "Kukki" Singh	
2018	The Test Case	Captain Manit Verma	
2020	Hasmukh	Krishna "KK" Kumar	
2023	Jee Karda	Rishabh Rathore	
2025	Saare Jahan Se Accha: The Silent Guardians	R&AW agent Sukhbir/Rafiq	
2025	Single Papa	Pawan	

== See also ==
- List of Indian film actors
