= Supriya Pilgaonkar =

Indian actress (born 1967)

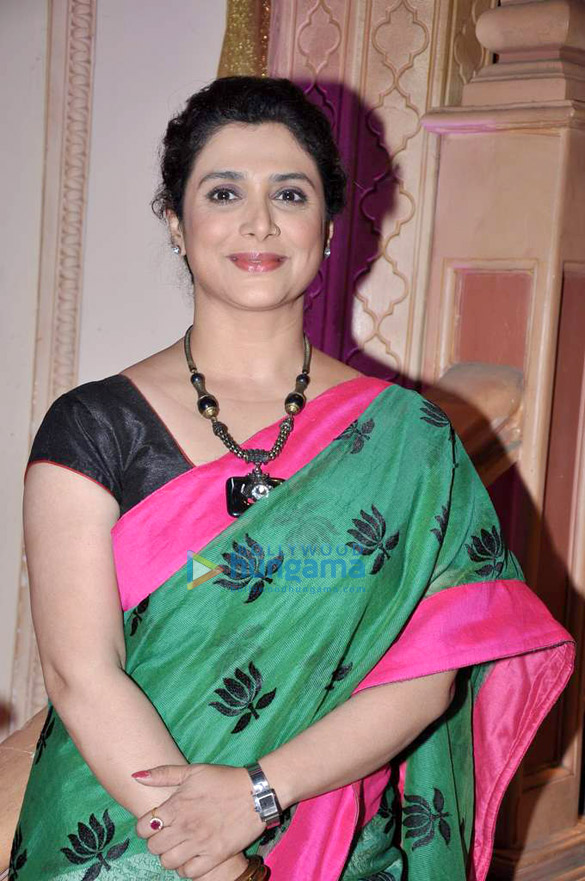
- Supriya Pilgaonkar in 2012
- Born: Supriya Sabnis; 16 August 1967 (age 59); Bombay, Maharashtra, India
- Occupations: Actress; producer
- Years active: 1983–present
- Spouse: Sachin Pilgaonkar (m. 1985)
- Children: Shriya Pilgaonkar (daughter)
- Father: Arun Sabnis

Supriya Pilgaonkar (née Sabnis; born 16 August 1967) is an Indian actress and producer known for her work in Marathi films and Hindi television, in a career spanning over four decades. Over the years, she has established herself as a versatile performer with acclaimed roles in both comedic and dramatic formats, earning numerous awards including a Maharashtra State Film Awards, a Filmfare Awards Marathi, three Indian Television Academy Awards and two Indian Telly Awards.

Born into a culturally rich family, she began her career as a theatre artist and gained early recognition with her debut in the Marathi film Navri Mile Navryala (1984). She is also known for her long-standing collaboration with her husband, actor-director Sachin, in acclaimed projects namely Ashi Hi Banwa Banwi and Maza Pati Karodpati (both 1988). Pilgaonkar gained nationwide fame with the sitcom Tu Tu Main Main (1994–2000), where her portrayal of a witty daughter-in-law, became iconic in Indian television history. She went on to deliver acclaimed performances in shows such as Sasural Genda Phool (2010–2012), Kuch Rang Pyar Ke Aise Bhi (2016–2017), and Home (2018), the latter earning her an ITA Award for her web debut.

In addition to her television success, she has acted in popular Hindi films such as Awara Paagal Deewana (2002), Tujhe Meri Kasam (2003), Aetbaar (2004) and Suraj Pe Mangal Bhari (2020). Among her notable Marathi film roles are Aamhi Satpute (2008), Navra Maza Navsacha (2004), and its sequel Navra Maza Navsacha 2 (2024), the first of which earned her the Maharashtracha Favourite Kon Award.

She married Sachin Pilgaonkar in 1985, and together they won the first season of Nach Baliye 1. Their daughter, Shriya Pilgaonkar, is also an actress active in films and on digital platforms.

== Early life ==
Pilgaonkar was born as Supriya Sabnis on 16 August 1967 into a Marathi family in Bombay (now Mumbai), Maharashtra.

== Career ==
=== Early Career in Theatre and Films (1983–1993) ===
Pilgaonkar made her foray into acting through theatre during her school years. Her first major commercial stage appearance was in the Marathi play Mahatare Arka Baiyit Garka in the mid-1980s. Around the same time, she was noticed by actor-director Sachin through her appearance on the television show Killbill. Impressed by her performance, he cast her in his second directorial venture, Navri Mile Navryala (1984), which also marked her film debut. At the time, Supriya was still in college, and her parents were initially reluctant to allow her to act in films. However, they eventually supported her decision to pursue the opportunity. Her performance in the film earned her the Best Actress Award at the Filmfare Marathi.

After a four-year hiatus, Pilgaonkar returned to the screen in 1988 with two films, both directed by and co-starring Sachin. In the comedy Maza Pati Karodpati, she portrayed a clever young woman who, driven by her dream of marrying a millionaire, disguises herself as a widow to win over a wealthy family through wit and theatrics. Her performance was widely appreciated and earned her the Maharashtra State Film Award for Best Actress. Her next release that year was the ensemble comedy Ashi Hi Banwa Banwi, produced by V. Shantaram Productions. In the film, she played a bubbly and strong-headed young woman, starring alongside Ashok Saraf, Laxmikant Berde, Siddharth Ray, Ashwini Bhave, Nivedita Joshi, and Priya Arun. Both films were well received, with Ashi Hi Banwa Banwi becoming a major box-office success. It grossed approximately ₹3 crore (US$320,000) worldwide, making it the highest-grossing Marathi film of its time, and has since achieved cult status.

In 1991, she appeared in the musical comedy Aayatya Gharat Gharoba, a Marathi remake of the 1972 Hindi film Dil Daulat Duniya. It is widely regarded as one of the most entertaining films in Marathi cinema, praised for its humor, music, and ensemble performances. The following year, she starred in Chor Chor, directed by Ramesh Deo, marking her first film not directed by Sachin. That same year, she made her television debut with the 13-episode series Kshitij Ye Nahi, which aired on DD National. She played the lead role of a young widow living with her daughter and father-in-law, who gradually finds love in her neighbor, starring alongside Tushar Dalvi, Vikram Gokhale, and Rajit Kapur.

=== Rise to Television Fame and Supporting Roles in Films (1994–2009) ===
Pilgaonkar portrayed a widowed nurse who marries a doctor, only to experience emotional upheaval when her presumed-dead husband reappears as a patient, in the 1994 family drama Kunku, opposite Ajinkya Deo. Also in that year, she gained widespread recognition on television with the sitcom Tu Tu Main Main, directed by Sachin, which humorously explored the love-hate relationship between a daughter-in-law and her mother-in-law. Supriya played the daughter-in-law opposite Reema Lagoo, who portrayed the mother-in-law. The show was a major success, running from 1994 to 2000, becoming one of the most iconic Hindi television comedies of its time, and earned Pilgaonkar the Best Actress in a Comic Role award at the Indian Television Academy Awards, along with a nomination for the Indian Telly Award in the same category in 2002.

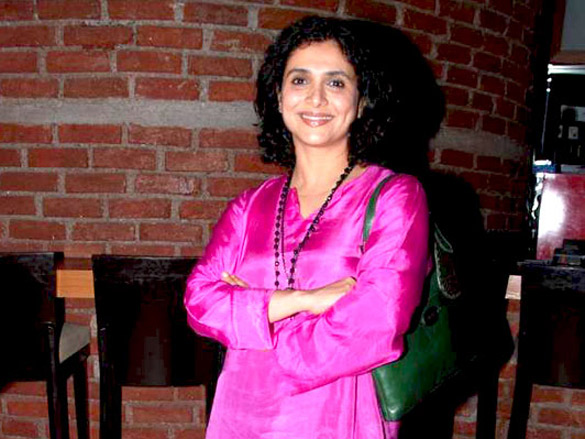
Pilgaonkar at the celebration of Sasural Genda Phool

Following the success of Tu Tu Main Main, she continued to play leading roles in various television shows across genres. In 1996, she appeared in the murder mystery series Mumkin, and later starred in the comedy-mystery Kabhi Biwi Kabhi Jasoos (2002–2003), portraying a wife who also works as a detective. In 2002, she appeared in Vikram Bhatt's Hindi film Awara Paagal Deewana, playing the role of a greedy wife to Paresh Rawal and mother to Amrita Arora. While the film received mixed reviews, her performance was appreciated, with Taran Adarsh of Bollywood Hungama calling it "first-rate." Subsequently, in 2003, she played a maid who acts as a cupid between the lead characters played by Riteish Deshmukh and Genelia D'Souza in the romantic drama Tujhe Meri Kasam.

In 2004, she reunited with Bhatt for the romantic psychological thriller Aetbaar, where she played the wife of Amitabh Bachchan in a story centered on a teenage girl who falls in love with a psychopath. While the film, notable for being the only production backed by Ratan Tata, was a commercial failure despite its high-profile cast, some critics noted that Pilgaonkar appeared too young to convincingly portray Bipasha Basu's mother. Furthermore, she played the lead in the Marathi slapstick comedy Navra Maza Navsacha, an ensemble film about the challenges faced by a couple during a bus journey from Mumbai to Ganpatipule to fulfill a religious vow. Inspired by the 1972 Hindi film Bombay to Goa, it earned both critical acclaim and commercial success, grossing around ₹5 crore (US$530,000) and becoming one of the highest-grossing Marathi films of 2004, while later achieving cult classic status. From 2006 to 2007, she played the lead in her home production sitcom Tu Tota Main Maina, and in the same year, reunited with Reema Lagoo for Kadvee Khattee Meethi (2006), a spiritual sequel to Tu Tu Main Main, in which she reprised a similar daughter-in-law role. The next year, took on supporting roles in several Hindi films, including Barsaat, Deewane Huye Paagal, and Bluffmaster!.

Her next Marathi release was the comedy-drama Aamhi Satpute, in which she played a compassionate woman who brings order and warmth to a chaotic household through discipline, care, and unwavering determination. Her performance earned her the Favourite Actress Award at the inaugural Maharashtracha Favourite Kon? awards, as well as the Favourite Jodi Award at the same ceremony. Around the same time, she also played the title role in the daily soap Radhaa Ki Betiyaan Kuch Kar Dikhayengi, which aired on Imagine TV and was produced by DJ's a Creative Unit. The show ran for a year and featured her as a strong matriarch guiding her daughters toward success.

=== Acclaimed Roles in Television (2010–2018) ===
Between 2010 and 2012, Pilgaonkar played the role of Badi Maa in the popular StarPlus drama Sasural Genda Phool, alongside Jay Soni and Ragini Khanna. She portrayed a woman who is abandoned by her husband and raises her children with resilience and grace. The show was one of the highest-rated series during its run, and her performance received critical acclaim. For her work, she won several accolades including the Indian Television Academy Award, Indian Telly Award, and Lions Gold Award in the Best Supporting Actress category, along with two Star Parivaar Awards for Favourite Saas.

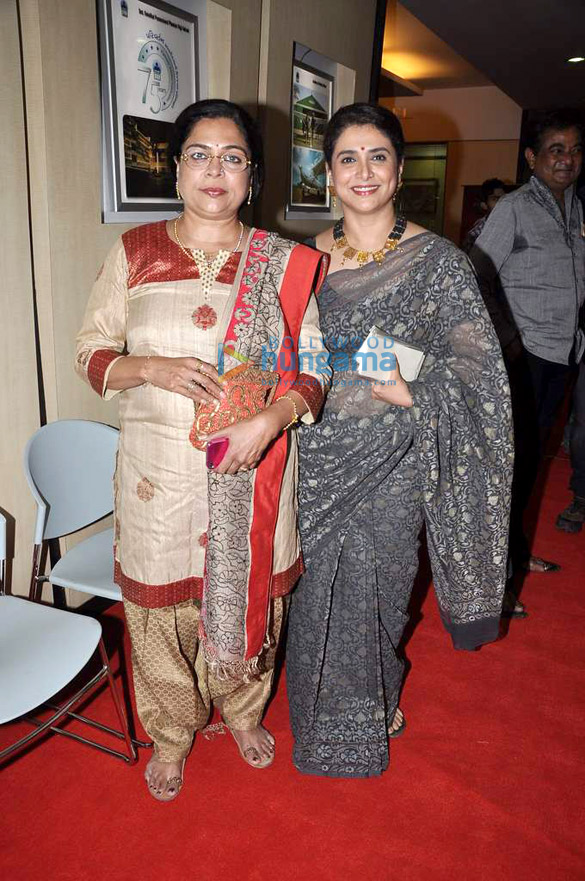
Pilgaonkar with Reema Lagoo at Sachin’s 50 years in cinema celebration, 2013

In 2013, she featured in the Marathi film Ekulti Ek, a drama centered on the relationship between a father and his daughter. The film was directed and produced by Sachin and also marked the acting debut of their daughter, Shriya Pilgaonkar. Ekulti Ek was well received by critics, with Ullas Shirke of Marathi Movie World noting, "It is Supriya Pilgaonkar, in those limited scenes to her share, who invites all the attention. She is simply superb in the radio interview session." The film performed moderately at the box office, and she earned a Maharashtracha Favourite Kon? Award nomination for Favourite Supporting Actress for her performance. Pilgaonkar's portrayal of a single, possessive mother in the romantic drama television series Kuch Rang Pyar Ke Aise Bhi was widely praised by both audiences and critics. Although the show did not consistently top television rating charts, it was well received online for its mature storytelling and nuanced performances. For her role, she won a Lions Gold Award and earned nominations at both the Indian Television Academy Awards and the Gold Awards.

Around this time, she appeared in a series of notable Hindi films, including Raj & DK's action-comedy A Gentleman (2017), Yash Raj Films' comedy-drama Hichki (2018), and Shree Narayan Singh's social drama Batti Gul Meter Chalu (2018). That same year, she made her web series debut with Home, an ALTBalaji production that revolved around the emotional bond of a middle-class family and their legal battle against a corrupt system that forces them to vacate their home. Her performance received widespread acclaim. Soumya Rao of Scroll.in wrote, "Pilgaonkar, especially, is in top form – and some heartwarming moments, most of them stemming from the Sethi family dynamic." A reviewer from The Quint praised her performance, stating, "Pilgaonkar steals the show. She perfectly fits into the role of the brave and resolute woman that this family needs in their time of financial hardship and emotional turmoil." For her role in Home, she won the Indian Television Academy Award for Best Actress Jury in a Web Series.

=== Recent Work and Navra Maza Navsacha 2 (2019–Present) ===
Next, Pilgaonkar appeared in the satirical comedy film Suraj Pe Mangal Bhari (2020), directed by Abhishek Sharma, where she played the mother of characters portrayed by Manoj Bajpayee and Fatima Sana Shaikh—despite being close in age to Bajpayee in real life. Nairita Mukherjee of India Today remarked, "Pilgaonkar as Madhu and Tulsi's mother (don't bother about the age difference between her and Manoj) is astounding, especially when she taunts her ageing son about budhapa, which is just two years away for him anyway." The film was released with only 50% occupancy due to the COVID-19 pandemic in India. In 2021, she played a no-nonsense judge at the Bombay High Court in the sports drama Rashmi Rocket. Ronak Kotecha of The Times of India wrote, "Pilgaonkar is believable as the judge." The film had a direct-to-digital release on ZEE5. Later that year, she reprised two of her most popular television roles: Ishwari in Kuch Rang Pyar Ke Aise Bhi: Nayi Kahaani, the third season of the romantic drama series, and Badi Maa in the second season of Sasural Genda Phool, which aired on Star Bharat. For the former, she won her second Indian Telly Award for Best Actress in a Supporting Role.

In 2024, she starred in the sequel to the 2004 hit Navra Maza Navsacha, reprising her role alongside the original cast, with the addition of Swwapnil Joshi and Hemal Ingle. While the film did not receive the same critical acclaim as its predecessor, the performances were appreciated. Mihir Bhanage of The Times of India noted, "Supriya has great screen presence." Despite mixed reviews, the film was a commercial success, grossing approximately ₹25 crore (US$2.7 million) worldwide and becoming the second highest-grossing Marathi film of the year.

== Personal life ==
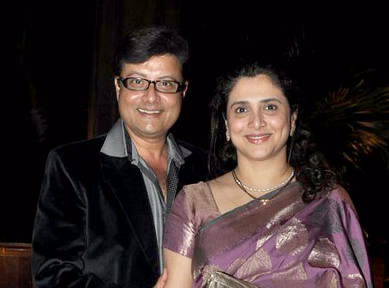
Pilgaonkar with husband Sachin in 2012

Pilgaonkar married fellow actor-director Sachin Pilgaonkar in December 1985, after they met on the set of her debut film Navri Mile Navryala in 1984. In 2005, the couple participated in and won the inaugural season of the celebrity dance reality show Nach Baliye. They have one daughter, Shriya Pilgaonkar, who is also an actress and has worked in films, television and digital platforms.

== Filmography ==
=== Films ===
Year	Work	Role	Language	Notes	Ref
1984	Navri Mile Navryala	Chameli	Marathi		
1988	Ashi Hi Banwa Banwi	Manisha	Marathi		
1988	Maza Pati Karodpati	Saudamini	Marathi		
1991	Aayatya Gharat Gharoba	Madhura	Marathi		
1992	Chor Chor		Marathi		
1994	Kunku	Madhvi Deshmukh	Marathi		
1996	Aisi Bhi Kya Jaldi Hai	-	Hindi	As casting director	
1999	Khoobsurat	Ratna Choudhary	Hindi		
2002	Awara Paagal Deewana	Paramjeet Patel	Hindi		
2003	Tujhe Meri Kasam	Sarro	Hindi		
2004	Aetbaar	Sheetal Malhotra	Hindi		
2004	Navra Maza Navsacha	Bhakti	Marathi		
2005	Barsaat	Supriya	Hindi		
2005	Deewane Huye Paagal	Sweety Aunty	Hindi		
2005	Bluffmaster!	Mrs. Malhotra	Hindi		
2008	Aamhi Satpute	Annapurna Satpute (Purna)	Marathi		
2010	Jaane Kahan Se Aayi Hai	Mrs. Parekh	Hindi		
2012	Krishna Aur Kans	Devaki	Hindi	Voice	
2013	Ekulti Ek	Nandini Deshpande	Marathi		
2017	Jai Mata Di	Jai Mata Di	Hindi	Short film	
2017	A Gentleman	Ramika Chetwani	Hindi		
2017	Vellipomakey		Telugu		
2018	Hichki	Sudha Mathur	Hindi		
2018	Batti Gul Meter Chalu	Beena Nautiyal	Hindi		
2019	Ashi Hi Aashiqui	-	Marathi	As producer	
2019	Family Of Thakurganj	Sumitra Devi	Hindi		
2019	Baatein	Suhasi Deshpande	Hindi	Short film	
2020	Suraj Pe Mangal Bhari	Rekha Rane	Hindi		
2021	Rashmi Rocket	Judge Savita Deshpande	Hindi		
2024	Ishq Vishk Rebound	Sanya's Mother	Hindi		
2024	Navra Maza Navsacha 2	Bhakti	Marathi		
2024	Kahan Shuru Kahan Khatam	Krishna's mother	Hindi		

=== Television ===
==== Fiction ====
Year	Show	Role	Network	Notes
1992–1993	Kshitij Ye Nahi	Nisha	DD National	
1994–2000	Tu Tu Main Main	Radha Verma / Shalu Verma	DD Metro	
1996	Mumkin	Shipra Sinha	DD National	
2002–2003	Kabhi Biwi Kabhi Jasoos	Sushma Jawahar Singh	Sony TV	
2006–2007	Tu Tota Main Maina	Maina	DD National	
2006	Kadvee Khattee Meethi	Rukmini Verma	Star One	
2008–2009	Radhaa Ki Betiyaan Kuch Kar Dikhayengi	Radha Sharma	NDTV Imagine	
2009	Basera	Manda Deshmukh	NDTV Imagine	
2010–2012	Sasural Genda Phool	Shailaja Kashyap	StarPlus	
2012	Lakhon Mein Ek	Kalpana	StarPlus	
2013–2014	Ek Nanad Ki Khushiyon Ki Chaabi...Meri Bhabhi	Amrit Zoravar Shergill	StarPlus	
2015	Dilli Wali Thakur Gurls	Mamta Laxminarayan Thakur	&TV	
2016–2017	Kuch Rang Pyar Ke Aise Bhi	Ishwari Dixit	Sony TV	
2018	Mere Sai – Shraddha Aur Saburi	Suhasini Bai	Sony TV	
2018	Ishqbaaaz	Nandini Dixit	StarPlus	Cameo appearance
2021	Kuch Rang Pyar Ke Aise Bhi: Nayi Kahaani	Ishwari Dixit	Sony TV	
2021	Janani	Savita	Ishara TV	
2021–2022	Sasural Genda Phool 2	Shailaja Kashyap	StarBharat	
2026	Mr. and Mrs. Parshuram	Bhargavi Kulkarni	Star Plus	

==== Non-fiction ====
Year	Title	Role	Network	Notes
1983	Killbill	Host	DD National	
2005	Nach Baliye 1	Contestant	Star One	Winner
2006	Popkorn Newz	Host	Zoom TV	
2009–2010	Maharashtracha Superstar 1	Judge	Zee Marathi	
2011	Comedy Ka Maha Muqabala	Contestant	Star Plus	

=== Play ===
- Mahatare Arka Baiyit Garka
- Khara Sangaycha Tar
- Time Pass

=== Web series ===
Year	Title	Role	Language	Platform	Notes
2018	Home	Vandana Sethi	Hindi	ALT Balaji	
2019	Pyaar Actually - Real Is Rare	Kanta	Hindi	Disney+ Hotstar	

== Awards and nominations ==
Year	Award	Category	Work	Result	Ref
1984	Filmfare Awards Marathi	Best Actress	Navri Mile Navryala	Won	
1988	Maharashtra State Film Awards	Best Actress	Maza Pati Karodpati	Won	
2002	Indian Television Academy Awards	Best Actress in a Comic Role	Tu Tu Main Main	Won	
2002	Indian Telly Awards	Best Actress in a Comic Role	Tu Tu Main Main	Nominated	
2009	Maharashtracha Favourite Kon?	Favourite Actress	Aamhi Satpute	Won	
2009	Maharashtracha Favourite Kon?	Favourite Jodi	Aamhi Satpute	Won	
2010	Indian Television Academy Awards	Best Supporting Actress	Sasural Genda Phool	Won	
2010	Indian Telly Awards	Best Supporting Actress – Popular	Sasural Genda Phool	Won	
2011	Lions Gold Awards	Favorite Supporting Actress	Sasural Genda Phool	Won	
2011	Star Parivaar Awards	Favourite Saas	Sasural Genda Phool	Won	
2012	Star Parivaar Awards	Favourite Saas	Sasural Genda Phool	Won	
2012	Indian Telly Awards	Best Supporting Actress – Popular	Sasural Genda Phool	Nominated	
2012	Indian Telly Awards	Best Supporting Actress – Jury	Sasural Genda Phool	Nominated	
2013	Maharashtracha Favourite Kon?	Favourite Supporting Actress	Ekulti Ek	Nominated	
2016	Gold Awards	Best Supporting Actress Critics	Kuch Rang Pyar Ke Aise Bhi	Nominated	
2017	Gold Awards	Best Supporting Actress Critics	Kuch Rang Pyar Ke Aise Bhi	Nominated	
2017	Lions Gold Awards	Best Supporting Actress	Kuch Rang Pyar Ke Aise Bhi	Won	
2017	Indian Television Academy Awards	Best Supporting Actress	Kuch Rang Pyar Ke Aise Bhi	Nominated	
2018	Indian Television Academy Awards	Best Supporting Actress	Kuch Rang Pyar Ke Aise Bhi	Nominated	
2018	Indian Television Academy Awards	Best Actress (Web Series)	Home	Won	
2019	iReel Awards	Best Actress – Drama	Home	Nominated	
2023	Indian Telly Awards	Best Supporting Actress – Popular	Kuch Rang Pyar Ke Aise Bhi	Won	

== See also ==
- List of Indian television actresses
- List of Hindi television actresses
- List of Indian film actresses
