= Sunny Hinduja =

Indian actor

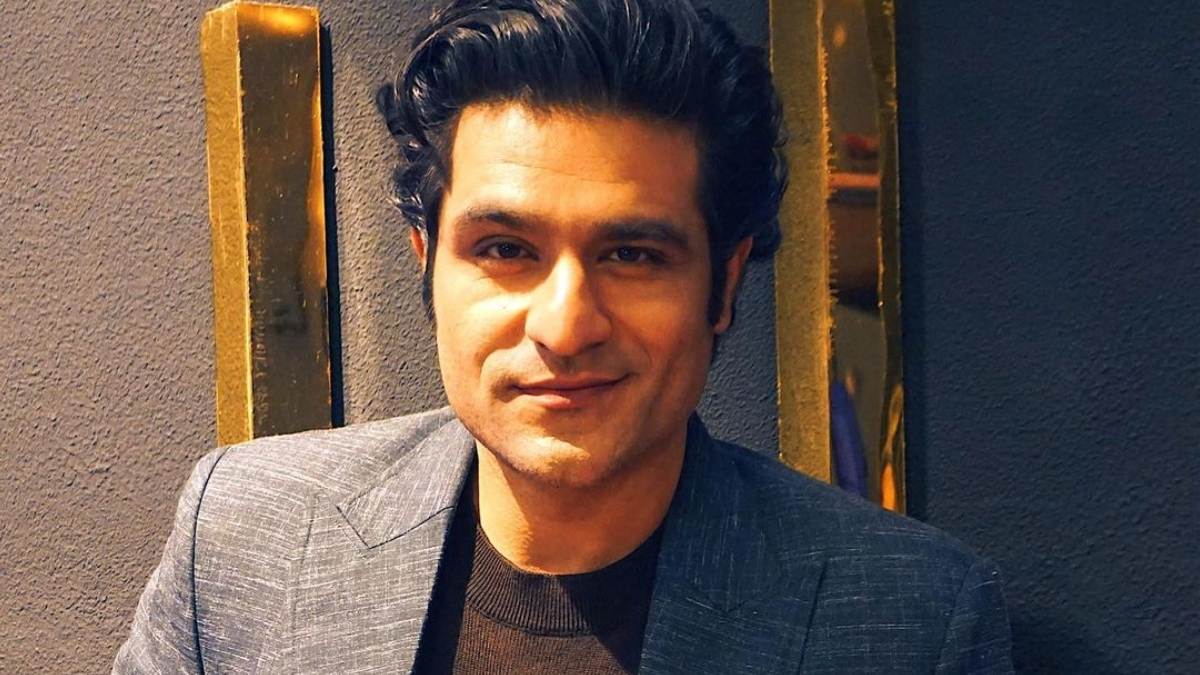
- Born: Sunny Hinduja; 25 November 1985 (age 40); Indore, Madhya Pradesh, India
- Education: Film and Television Institute of India (FTII), Pune.
- Occupation: Actor
- Years active: 2010–present
- Known for: TVF Aspirants
- Spouse: Shinjini Raval

Sunny Hinduja (born 25 November 1985) is an Indian actor. He is known for his work in the Hindi film and television industry. In 2021, he gained popularity among the audience by playing an important character of Sandeep Bhaiya in the TVF web series, Aspirants. He has also worked in TV series The Family Man (2019), Chacha Vidhayak Hain Humare Season 2 (2021), and Jamun (2021).

== Early life and education ==
Sunny Hinduja was born in a Sindhi family in Indore, Madhya Pradesh. His father's name is Satram Das Hinduja and his elder brother is Dhiraj Hinduja. He completed studies from Daly College of Indore, Madhya Pradesh and Birla Institute of Technology and Science, Pilani – Dubai Campus. Sunny received his actor training at the Film and Television Institute of India (FTII), Pune.

== Career ==
Sunny debuted with the film Shaapit: The Cursed in the year 2010. He also served as a theater artist at FTII and played several long and short plays. Sunny also starred in the movie Ballad of Rustom, in which he performed the lead role in Rustum. In 2012, Sunny was part of an international project led by 25 filmmakers worldwide, The Owner. He has appeared in several television ads such as Sprite, Continental Coffee, etc.

== Filmography ==
=== Films ===
Year	Title	Role	Notes
2008	Shaapit	Kuljeet Singh	
2011	Cycle Kick	Ali Mirza	
2018	Aasma	Usman	
2018	Pinky Memsaab	Santosh	
2019	The Tashkent Files	Raagini's neighbour	Deleted scene
2019	Mardaani 2	Viplav Beniwal	
2021	Jamun	Amar Jamun Prashad	Eros Now release
2022	Thai Massage	Mukesh Dubey	Netflix release
2023	Shehzada	Sarang Paul	
2024	Yodha	Rafiq	
2024	Hello Mummy	Aashabha	Malayalam film

=== Web-series ===
Year	Title	Role	Notes
2019–21	The Family Man	Milind Hinduja	Released on Amazon Prime Video
2020	Rasbhari	Pappu Tiwari	Released on Amazon Prime Video
2020	Bhaukaal	Farukh Qureshi	
2021	Inside Edge	Sultan Ali Khan	Released on Amazon Prime Video
2021–present	Aspirants	Sandeep	Released on TVFPlay, YouTube and Amazon Prime Video
2021	Chacha Vidhayak Hain Humare	Vicky Maheshwari	Released on Amazon Prime Video
2023	Sandeep Bhaiya	Sandeep	Released on TVFPlay and YouTube
2023	The Railway Men	Jagmohan Kumawat	Netflix
2025	Mandala Murders	Anant Pant	Netflix
2025	Saare Jahan Se Accha: The Silent Guardians	Ali Murtaza Malik, head of ISI	Netflix
2026	Vimal Khanna	Vimal Khanna	Premiered on Amazon MX Player

=== TV series ===
Year	Title	Role	Notes
2010	Seven	Shiven	Premiered on Sony TV (India)
2010	Rishta.com	Hemant Khosla	Premiered on Sony TV (India)
2011–2012	Chandragupta Maurya	Callisthenes	Premiered on Imagine TV (India)
2014	Adrishya	Ravindra Kaushik	Premiered on Epic TV (India)
2015	Reporters	Manav Gupta	Premiered on Sony Entertainment Television (India)
2019–2020	Mere Dad Ki Dulhan	Anurag Malhotra	Premiered on Sony Entertainment Television (India)
