= Sapne Vs Everyone =

Indian television series

- Release poster
- Genre: Drama
- Written by: Ambrish Verma
- Directed by: Ambrish Verma
- Music by: Akaash Mukherjee
- Original language: Hindi
- No. of seasons: 2
- No. of episodes: 10

Production
- Producer: Arunabh Kumar
- Cinematography: Georgy John
- Production company: The Viral Fever

Original release
- Network: YouTube; Amazon Prime Video
- Release: 8 December 2023 – present

Sapne Vs Everyone is an Indian Hindi-language drama television series produced by The Viral Fever (TVF). Written and directed by Ambrish Verma, it premiered on December 8, 2023, on TVF's YouTube channel and later on Amazon Prime Video. The series follows two dreamers, Prashant Narula (Paramvir) and Jimmy Mehta (Ambrish Verma), as they navigate societal expectations, morality, and personal ambitions in pursuit of their dreams in acting and real estate, respectively.

== Cast ==
- Paramvir Singh Cheema as Prashant Narula
- Ambrish Verma as Rajkumar "Jimmy" Mehta
- Naveen Kasturia as Sumit Sir
- Vijayant Kohli as Kukreja
- Abhishek Chauhan as Tony Kukreja
- Kirandeep Kaur
- Eklavey Kashyap as Samarth
- Jairoop Jeevan as Pandit Ji
- Sukhwinder Chahal as Grover Uncle
- Akshit Arora as Jatin
- Babla Kochar as Jimmy's Father
- Vaisakh Shankar as Shishir/ Tarun Pandey (Dual Role)
- Bhavya Sharma as Neetu
- Manjeet Malik as Dagar
- Neeta Mohindra as Prashant's Mother
- Ishan Anuan Singh as Chauhan
- Kirandeep Kaur Sran as Anjali
- Rajat Dahiya as Manish
- Akhil Kaimal as Ashvin
- Nidhi Shah as Vedha
- Daadhi R Pandey as Prashant's Father
- Khushali Kumar as Tripti
- Amit Behl as Malhotra

== Production ==
The series, consisting of five episodes in its first season, is produced by Arunabh Kumar, with music by Akaash Mukherjee and cinematography by Georgy John. It marks TVF’s venture into darker, more experimental storytelling, focusing on emotional struggles and complex characters.

== Reception ==
Sapne Vs Everyone received critical acclaim for its screenplay, performances, and emotional depth.

The series entered IMDb’s Top 250 TV Shows list globally and won the Best Branded Program at the Asian Academy Creative Awards in 2024.

== Future ==
Following its global success, a second season was announced in February 2024, with interest from multiple OTT platforms for distribution. Prime Video released the first look at the second season in March 2026.
