= Newton (film) =

2017 Indian comedy drama film

- Theatrical release poster
- Directed by: Amit V. Masurkar
- Screenplay by: Amit V. Masurkar; Mayank Tewari
- Produced by: Manish Mundra
- Starring: Rajkummar Rao; Pankaj Tripathi; Anjali Patil; Raghubir Yadav
- Cinematography: Swapnil S. Sonawane
- Edited by: Shweta Venkat Mathew
- Music by: Benedict Taylor; Naren Chandavarkar; Rachita Arora
- Production companies: Eros International; Drishyam Films; Colour Yellow Productions
- Distributed by: Eros International
- Release dates: 10 February 2017 (Berlinale); 22 September 2017 (India)
- Running time: 106 minutes
- Country: India
- Language: Hindi
- Budget: ₹10 crore
- Box office: ₹15 crore

Newton is a 2017 Indian Hindi-language black comedy-drama film directed and co-written by Amit V. Masurkar. The film stars Rajkummar Rao in the title role of a government servant who is sent to a politically sensitive area of central India on election duty. Pankaj Tripathi, Anjali Patil and Raghubir Yadav appeared in prominent roles. The film was produced by Manish Mundra under Drishyam Films, known for the 2015 film Masaan. The film is Amit Masurkar's second feature after his debut with Sulemani Keeda in 2013.

Newton had its world premiere in the Forum section of the 67th Berlin International Film Festival. The film secured eight nominations at the 63rd Filmfare Awards, including Best Film (Critics), Best Actor (Critics) for Rao and Best Supporting Actor for Tripathi, while winning Best Film and Filmfare Award for Best Story. Rao won the Asia Pacific Screen Award for Best Actor and the writers won the award for Best Screenplay. Newton was also awarded the National Film Award for Best Feature Film in Hindi. Pankaj Tripathi won a special mention at 65th National Film Awards. The film was selected as the Indian entry for the Best Foreign Language Film at the 90th Academy Awards.

== Plot ==
Nutan "Newton" Kumar, a rookie government clerk on reserve is sent on election duty to a Naxal-controlled town in the insurgency-ridden jungles of Chhattisgarh, India, when one of the main duty officers there is found to be facing heart problems. Faced with the apathy of the war-weary Central Reserve Police Force (CRPF) security forces, led by Assistant Commandant Aatma Singh, and the looming fear of guerrilla attacks by communist insurgents, he tries his best to conduct free and fair voting despite the odds stacked against him. He is disappointed when the voters do not turn up for the election. Later when a foreign reporter turns up at the polling station, the CRPF force the villagers from the constituency to turn up to cast their votes. When one of the villagers enters the polling booth, he is bewildered by the voting machine and does not understand how to operate it.

After talking to the villagers, Newton soon realizes that they have no idea what the election is about. Some thought they would earn money from this, while others asked hopelessly about getting paid sufficiently for their work. He desperately tries to educate them but to no avail. Taking the lead, a frustrated Aatma Singh cuts off Newton aside and shames the villagers by telling them that these officers have risked their lives for their vote, and they should not turn them away. He tells them that the voting machine is a toy; there are symbols of elephants, cycles, etc. and they could press any symbol they like (leaving them uneducated about the fact that those symbols represent respective political parties). So while they vote for their favorite symbol, instead of politicians they have never heard about, the foreign reporter gets a good news report about India's democracy.

Newton wants to sit at the polling booth for the stipulated time but is forced to flee due to a Naxal ambush, which he later realizes was actually staged by the CRPF. Upon learning this, he tries to outrun his escort team back to the polling booth, but gets caught on both sides, and is forcibly taken back to safety. On the way back, Newton decides to collect the votes of four villagers who suddenly turn up from deep inside the forest. Aatma Singh is reluctant to let them do so. Taking his duty very seriously, Newton steals Aatma Singh's rifle and holds the officer at gunpoint till the villagers cast their votes. Singh comments out of frustration that he did not want polling to be conducted in an area that was only secured by government forces 6 months ago, mentioning that there are still more landmines there than men. He tells Newton that he does not want to lose any more troops, especially when the government cannot even supply them with night vision goggles that they have been requesting for 2 years. Newton keeps him at gunpoint even after the voting for the remaining two minutes of his official duty (till 3 pm). The CRPF troops then beat him up out of frustration.

The film concludes with a shot of the area six months later, showing mining activity going on. Aatma Singh is shown shopping in civilian dress with his wife and daughter during holidays, suggesting he is a human and conditions in Naxal-affected areas made him a dispassionate and cynical person. Newton is shown in his office wearing a neck brace for his injury from the beating but otherwise happy, and keeping with his old ways. He is visited by the local election officer Malko who asks him what happened after she left as she is unaware of the events and Newton asks her to tell everything over tea, but only after five minutes, when Newton's scheduled lunch break begins.

== Cast ==
- Rajkummar Rao as Nutan “Newton” Kumar
- Pankaj Tripathi as Assistant Commandant Aatma Singh
- Anjali Patil as Malko Netam
- Raghubir Yadav as Loknath
- Danish Hussain as DIG of Police
- Mukesh Prajapati as Shambhu
- Krishna Singh Bisht as Krishna
- Pistak Gond as The Village Patel
- Sanjay Mishra in a special appearance as an Election Instructor
- Mukesh Nagar as Mangal Netam
- Bachan Pachera as Newton's Father
- Kirti Shreeyansh Jain as Newton's Mother
- Omkar Das Manikpuri as Lakhma
- Jyotsana Trivedi as Fiancé

== Soundtrack ==
Track listing
No.	Title	Lyrics	Music	Singer(s)	Length
1.	"Panchi Ud Gaya"	Varun Grover	Naren Chandavarkar and Benedict Taylor	Mohan Kannan	4:16
2.	"Chal Tu Apna Kaam Kar"	Irshad Kamil	Rachita Arora	Amit Trivedi	3:51
3.	"Chal Tu Apna Kaam Kar" (Version 2)	Irshad Kamil	Rachita Arora	Raghubir Yadav	3:34

== Reception ==
Newton was released to critical praise and was also a commercial success. On the review aggregator website Rotten Tomatoes, 94% of 18 critics' reviews are positive, with an average rating of 7.8/10. On the Indian film review aggregator website The Review Monk, Newton received a 7.5 out of 10 average score based on 23 reviews.

Rajeev Masand gave the film a rating of 4 stars out of 5 and said that, "Newton is relevant and timely without being boring or inaccessible. You could say it lays on its message too thick in the end, or that the pace occasionally slips. But these are minor nigglings that never dent the impact of its thrust." Neil Soans of The Times of India gave the film a rating of 4.5 stars out of 5, saying, "Newton has dared to take on an issue that our vast majority turns a blind eye to, and slaps us out of our blissful ignorance. Amidst laughing, it'll leave you thinking, which - and we need to be reminded of this - is what good cinema should do. Both your funny bone and your grey cells will thank you for watching it." Soans praised the performances of the cast - particularly that of Rao and Tripathi - and the screenplay by Masurkar and Tewari.

Suhani Singh of India Today gave the film a rating of 4 stars out of 5 and said that, "Newton is a dark comedy that gives you equal measures of dread and disillusionment and hope and hilarity. It makes you see the pitfalls of the democratic system but also tells you that it's the only one capable of positive change. This is reality at its finest, with credible performances and backdrops that immerse viewers into the world and where even the faces of the background characters leave a heartbreaking impression." Shubhra Gupta of The Indian Express gave the film a rating of 4 stars out of 5 saying that, "Director Amit V Masurkar and co-scriptwriter Mayank Tewari have crafted a strong black comedy. It is as sharp and subversive as the classic Jaane Bhi Do Yaaro, and even though it is entirely sobering, it leaves us feeling just a little better about ourselves." She also praised the performances of the actors saying, "Rajkummar Rao is enjoying a purple patch. After Bareilly Ki Barfi, here he is again stitching up a big performance full of small things: blinking, thinking, doing. He is at his most interesting when he is being quiet: he makes us watch. Pankaj Tripathi, as the head of the security detail, cynical yet doing the best he can, is lovely too. For once the talented Patil has been used well, and as for Raghubir Yadav, he gives us, after Peepli Live, another stand-out act, a lesson in How To Immerse Yourself Effortlessly In Your Role.

Rohit Vats of Hindustan Times gave the film a rating of 4 stars out of 5 and said that, "It is one of the finest political satires we have seen in the last couple of years. It refrains from taking sides and offers a humorous take on state versus the Maoists bloody battle. It raises questions on the importance of the electoral system we are so proud of. It takes us much beyond what we see. The team of Rajkummar Rao, Pankaj Tripathi, Raghuvir Yadav and Anjali Patil has come up with a top-notch performance."

Harish Wankhede calls Newton 'A new Dalit Hero' in the Indian Express review. He suggests that the most reviews of the film neglect the protagonist's social identity, while emphasising the film's creative aspects. "Newton, no doubt, is a refreshing entry in the genre of commercial art house cinema. However, more significantly, the director offers a new social imaginary to depict the film’s protagonist. A new Dalit hero is offered to the audience through the subtle use of certain symbolic gestures and social codes."

Newton received a warm response at its premiere at the Berlin Film Festival. It also won the CICAE Award for best film in the Forum Section. The Huffington Post wrote "Newton is a touching, personal and very human film about the strength of one very resolute rookie election clerk to uphold the democratic process in a rebel-threatened area."

Newton was India's official entry for the 90th Academy Awards; it was also the first Indian film to receive a grant of Rs 1 crore from the Central Government.

== Release ==
Newton had its world premiere at the Berlin International Film Festival held from 9–19 February 2017 in Berlin, Germany while in India it got released on 22 September 2017.

=== Box office ===
Newton grossed Rs 11.75 crore net in the first week in India. The film grossed Rs 3.75 crore in its second weekend, taking the total to Rs 15.50 crore. It was a box office success.

== Controversy ==
After the film's release and its selection as India's entry for the Oscars, Newton was criticized for its striking similarities with the Iranian movie Secret Ballot. In defense, film-maker Anurag Kashyap voiced his support to the team of Newton, stating "Newton is as much a copy of Secret Ballot, The Avengers is of Watan Ke Rakhwale".

The producer and director of Secret Ballot further clarified that Newton is not a copy of his film. Anurag Kashyap started an online chat with the producer of Secret Ballot Marco Müller, and he stated that "There's not even a hint of plagiarism". Kashyap then asked for his permission and shared a screenshot of the conversation on his Facebook account. Subsequently, the director of the Iranian film Babak Payami stated in an online interview that he "saw the film and there is no sign of plagiarism. These are completely different films."

Other commentators have noted a similarity between the film's official poster and that for Satyajit Ray's film Ganashatru.

== Awards and nominations ==
Date of ceremony	Award	Category	Recipient(s) and nominee(s)	Result	Ref
2017	Berlin International Film Festival	International Federation of Art Cinemas (CICAE) award	Newton	Won	
2017	Hong Kong International Film Festival	Young Cinema Competition Jury Award	Newton	Won	
2017	International Film Festival of Kerala	FIPRESCI Award: Best International Film	Newton	Won	
2017	International Film Festival of Kerala	NETPAC Award: Best Asian Film	Newton	Won	
2017	Asia Pacific Screen Awards	Best Actor	Rajkummar Rao	Won	
2017	Asia Pacific Screen Awards	Best Screenplay	Amit V Masurkar, Mayank Tewari	Won	
4 December 2017	Star Screen Awards	Best Film (Critics)	Newton	Won	
4 December 2017	Star Screen Awards	Best Actor (Critics)	Rajkummar Rao	Won	
4 December 2017	Star Screen Awards	Best Director	Amit V Masurkar	Nominated	
4 December 2017	Star Screen Awards	Best Supporting Actor	Pankaj Tripathi	Nominated	
4 December 2017	Star Screen Awards	Best Supporting Actress	Anjali Patil	Nominated	
30 December 2017	Zee Cine Awards	Best Film (Jury's Choice)	Amit V Masurkar	Nominated	
30 December 2017	Zee Cine Awards	Best Actor – Male (Jury's Choice)	Rajkummar Rao	Nominated	
20 January 2018	Filmfare Awards	Best Film (Critics)	Newton	Won	
20 January 2018	Filmfare Awards	Best Actor (Critics)	Rajkummar Rao	Nominated	
20 January 2018	Filmfare Awards	Best Supporting Actor	Pankaj Tripathi	Nominated	
20 January 2018	Filmfare Awards	Best Editing	Shweta Venkat Mathew	Nominated	
20 January 2018	Filmfare Awards	Best Original Story	Amit V Masurkar	Won	
20 January 2018	Filmfare Awards	Best Screenplay	Amit V Masurkar, Mayank Tewari	Nominated	
20 January 2018	Filmfare Awards	Best Dialogue	Amit V Masurkar, Mayank Tewari	Nominated	
20 January 2018	Filmfare Awards	Best Cinematography	Swapnil S Sonawane	Nominated	
6 March 2018	Bollywood Film Journalists Awards	Best Feature Film	Newton	Won	
6 March 2018	Bollywood Film Journalists Awards	Best Actor	Rajkummar Rao	Won	
17 March 2018	Asian Film Awards	Best Film	Newton	Nominated	
17 March 2018	Asian Film Awards	Best Actor	Rajkummar Rao	Nominated	
17 March 2018	Asian Film Awards	Best Screenplay	Amit V Masurkar, Mayank Tewari	Won	
20 March 2018	News18 Reel Movie Awards	Best Director	Amit V Masurkar	Won	
20 March 2018	News18 Reel Movie Awards	Best Supporting Actor	Pankaj Tripathi	Won	
20 March 2018	News18 Reel Movie Awards	Best Editing	Shweta Venkat Mathew	Won	
20 March 2018	News18 Reel Movie Awards	Best Film	Newton	Nominated	
20 March 2018	News18 Reel Movie Awards	Best Cinematography	Swapnil S Sonawane	Nominated	
20 March 2018	News18 Reel Movie Awards	Best Sound	Niraj Gera	Nominated	
20 March 2018	News18 Reel Movie Awards	Best Screenplay	Amit V Masurkar, Mayank Tewari	Nominated	
20 March 2018	News18 Reel Movie Awards	Best Dialogues	Amit V Masurkar, Mayank Tewari	Nominated	
3 May 2018	National Film Awards	Best Feature Film (Hindi)	Producer: Drishyam Films Director: Amit V Masurkar	Won	
3 May 2018	National Film Awards	Special Mention (Actor)	Pankaj Tripathi	Won	
22 June 2018	International Indian Film Academy Awards	Best Editing	Shweta Venkat Mathew	Won	
22 June 2018	International Indian Film Academy Awards	Best Film	Newton	Nominated	
22 June 2018	International Indian Film Academy Awards	Best Director	Amit V Masurkar	Nominated	
22 June 2018	International Indian Film Academy Awards	Best Story	Amit V Masurkar	Won	
22 June 2018	International Indian Film Academy Awards	Best Actor	Rajkummar Rao	Nominated	
22 June 2018	International Indian Film Academy Awards	Best Supporting Actor	Pankaj Tripathi	Nominated	

== See also ==
- List of submissions to the 90th Academy Awards for Best Foreign Language Film
- List of Indian submissions for the Academy Award for Best Foreign Language Film
