= Blouse (disambiguation) =

A blouse is a loose-fitting upper garment.

Blouse may also refer to:

- Blouse (band), an American alternative rock band
- Blouse (short film), a 2014 Indian Hindi film
- "Blouse" (song), a 2021 single by Clairo
- Blouse jacket or blouson, an outer garment
- Sasha Blouse, a character in the Japanese manga series Attack on Titan
