= Ronjini Chakraborty =

American actress and model

- Born: 24 February 1992 (age 34); Kolkata, India
- Occupations: Actress; Model
- Years active: 2011 – present
- Notable work: Tumbbad, Article 15 and TVF Pitchers
- Spouse: Ashish Verma

Ronjini Chakraborty (born 24 February 1992) is an Indian actress and model. She has established her career in Hindi and Bengali films.

== Personal life ==
Ronjini was born in a middle-class Bengali family on 8 December 1992 in Kolkata. She has been trained in the Indian Classical Music for 7 years during her adolescence. Her mother wanted her to be a singer, but her preference was acting. That's why she chose acting as her career. She started her acting journey while she was in college. She joined a theatre group named “Theatrecian” and did several theatre plays like ‘The Lesson’ directed by Eugene Ionesco, ‘No Exit’ directed by Jean-Paul Sartre, ‘The Home Coming’ directed by Harold Pinter, ‘The Goat’ directed by Edward Albee, and ‘The Comedy Kitchen’ adopted by Dhruv Mukherjee. Then, she joined the FTII (Film and Television Institute of India) in Pune to do an acting course and to enhance her acting skills. After the completion of her training, she came back to Kolkata.

== Career ==
After doing several Bengali films including Tears of Nandigram and Trayadashi, she shifted to Mumbai. There, she started giving auditions and got selected for TV ads. She did several advertisements including Cadbury Celebration, Sony Mix Channel, Bharat Nirman, Yebhi.com, and 7Up.

In 2011, Ronjini was shortlisted for a Colors TV daily soap, “Na Bole Tum Na Maine Kuch Kaha,” but she couldn't be a part of the show as she got an offer for a movie, From Sydney with Love at the same time. From both choices, she opted for the movie. In 2013, she made her appearance in a sitcom of Channel V named Paanch 5 Wrongs Make A Right She has also appeared in short films such as ‘A Perfect Day’ by Abhinandan Gupta (2011), ‘Just Friends’ by Arun Sukumar (2013), and ‘Blouse’ by Vijayeta Kumar (2014). She has appeared in various films, like Autohead (2016), Tumbbad (2018), Simmba (2018), and Article 15(2019). She has acted in many Hindi TV series, including ‘Man's World’ (2015), Stories by Rabindranath Tagore (2015), ‘Not Out’ (2016), ‘PA Gals’ (2017), ‘Lalbazaar’ (2020), Raktanchal (2020).

The Great Indian Murder(2022) and TVF Pitchers(2022).

== Filmography ==
=== Films ===
Year	Title	Role	Language
2011	Abosheshey	Rai	Bengali
2012	From Sydney with Love	Sneha	Hindi
2012	I. D.	Party girl	Hindi
2014	Blouse	Kanta	Hindi
2014	Tears of Nandigram		Bengali
2016	Autohead	Roopa	Hindi
2017	Sesh Katha	Kinkini	Bengali
2018	Tumbbad	Vinayak's mistress	Hindi
2018	Simmba	Poornima	Hindi
2019	Chippa	Newspaper Girl	Hindi
2019	Article 15	Dr. Malti	Hindi

=== TV/Web Series ===
Year	Title	Role	Platform	Notes
	Crime Patrol	Various Characters	Sony Entertainment Television	
2013–2014	Paanch 5 Wrongs Make A Right	Zara Ahmed Khan	Channel V India	
2015	Man's World	Chhaya	Y-Films	Web series
2015	Stories by Rabindranath Tagore	Giribala	Hoichoi	Web series
2016	Not Fit	Landlord	Dice Media	Single Episode
2017–2018	PA Gals	Sonali Mukherjee	Girliyapa (The Viral Fever)	Web series
2020	Overtime	Ramya	YouTube	Web series
2020	Raktanchal	Seema	MX Player	Web series
2020	Lalbazaar	Farzana	ZEE5	Web series
2022	The Great Indian Murder	Champi	Disney+ Hotstar	Webseries
	TVF Pitchers	Aparajita	ZEE5	Webseries
