= Happily Ever After (2020 TV series) =

Indian web series

- Genre: Drama; Comedy
- Written by: Navjot Gulati
- Story by: Navjot Gulati; Nishant Goyal
- Directed by: Navjot Gulati
- Starring: Naveen Kasturia; Harshita Gaur; Shivankit Singh Parihar; Gurpreet Saini; Shruti Das
- Music by: Gaurav Chatterji
- Country of origin: India
- Original language: Hindi
- No. of seasons: 1
- No. of episodes: 8

Production
- Producers: Firdaus S. Sayed; Farhan P. Zamma; Jitendra Singla
- Production company: Salt Media

Original release
- Network: The Zoom Studio; YouTube
- Release: 1 February – 21 March 2020

Happily Ever After is an Indian Hindi-language web series created by The Zoom Studios. Written and directed by Navjot Gulati, it stars Naveen Kasturia and Harshita Gaur with Shivankit Singh Parihar, Gurpreet Saini and Shruti Das. It traces the story of a couple, Roneet and Avni who struggle to achieve their dream of having a perfect wedding because of a limited budget.

Happily Ever After directed by Navjot Gulati, premiered simultaneously in the company's media streaming platform The Zoom Studio and in YouTube, on 1 February 2020 and it received positive response from audience.

== Cast ==
Character	Portrayed by	Description	Appearance
Character	Portrayed by	Description	Season 1
Roneet Bagchi	Naveen Kasturia	Avni's boyfriend and later husband	Main
Avani Mehndiratta	Harshita Gaur	Roneet's girlfriend and later wife	Main
Manny	Shivankit Singh Parihar	Roneet's friend, Megha's boyfriend	Recurring
Rishi	Gurpreet Saini	Roneet's friend, Surbhi's boyfriend and later husband	Recurring
Surbhi	Shruti Das	Roneet's friend, Rishi's girlfriend and later wife	Recurring
Shankar Mehndiratta "Tauji"	Rajiv Khanna	Avni's elder paternal uncle	Recurring
Prema Masi	Meenal Kapoor	Roneet's maternal aunt, Jaya's sister	Recurring
Badi Bua	Ramna Wadhawan	Avni's eldest paternal aunt	Recurring
Choti Bua	Meenakshi Sethi	Avni's younger paternal aunt	Recurring
Jaya Bagchi	Shabnam Vadhera	Roneet's mother, Prema's sister	Recurring
Ragini Mehndiratta	Shivani Saluja	Avni's sister-in-law	Recurring
Megha	Ravina Sharma	Roneet's cousin, Manny's girlfriend	Recurring
Kishanchand Mehndiratta	Sanjay Bhatia	Usha's husband, Avni's father	Recurring
Usha Mehndiratta	Priti Shrivastav	Kishanchand's wife, Avni's mother	Recurring
Riva	Yoshita Gandhi	Roneet's cousin	Recurring
Geeta Udeshi	Nimmo Mehndiratta "Taiji"	Avni's elder paternal aunt	Recurring
Jay	Pratyush Uday	Roneet and Avni's wedding planner	Recurring
Prakash Fufa	Girish Thapar		Recurring
Vishnu Chacha	Raj Naini	Avni's paternal uncle	Recurring
Mausaji	Dalip Gulati	Avni's maternal uncle	Recurring
Mausiji	Garima Agarwal	Avni's maternal aunt	Recurring
Gautam	Vivaan Soni	Avni's friend	Recurring
Vikram	Deependra Kumawat		Recurring
Saaransh	Mannit Tanna	Avni's nephew	Recurring
Deven Chacha	Aditya Bhattarcharya		Recurring
Jagdish	Amit Srivastava		Recurring
Shubhash	Lokendra Soghani		Recurring
Ishani	Anju Gaur		Recurring
Rahul Chaudhary	Samar		Recurring
Sanjay Sharma	Deepak Sharma	Receptionist at Kumbalgarh Palace	Recurring
Zainab	Tanvie Kishore	Roneet's fling	Recurring
Dad	Ramesh Joshi	Zainab's father	Recurring
Ashwin	Arjun Satam		Recurring
Ashima	Jahaan Kaur	Surbhi's aunt, a wedding planner	Recurring
Upasana	Sweety D'souza		Recurring
Pandit	Om Prakash Tiwari	Roneet and Avni's wedding pandit	Recurring
Client	Siddharth Maitreya	Avni's client	Recurring
Siddharth	Sanket Pawar	Groom at the wedding crashed by Roneet and Avni	Recurring
Sonia	Nupur Paneri	Bride at the wedding crashed by Roneet and Avni	Recurring
Yasmin	Sakshi Benipuri	Prostitute hired by Manny for Roneet	Recurring
Staff Member	Aman Acharya	Hotel staff of Kumbalgarh	Recurring
Banker	Kunal Patel	Roneet's bank's manager	Recurring
Young Roneet	Ansh Mehta	Roneet in school flashback	Recurring
Young Avni	Vrishti Chawda	Avni in school flashback	Recurring
Young Manny	Varun Buddhadev	Manny in school flashback	Recurring
Teacher	Seema Dusane	Teacher in school flashback	Recurring

== Production ==
Naveen Kasturia was cast as Roneet Bagchi. While, Harshita Gaur was cast as Avani Mehndiratta. A major portion of the series was shot at the hotels and palaces in Kumbalgarh. The show has managed to get the largest ensemble cast of 54 characters under one roof.

== Release ==
Happily Ever After was released on 1 February 2020 on Zoom Studio's official YouTube page. It is also digitally available on ZEE5 and MX Player.

== Episodes ==
No.	Title	Directed by	Written by	Original release date
1	"Vada Karo"	Navjot Gulati	Navjot Gulati	1 February 2020
From meeting for the first time to planning their wedding, Roneet and Avni has had a whirlwind romance. Avni convince Roneet to have a destination wedding. Will they be able to have a big, fat Indian wedding as they are short on budget.
2	"Buenas Noches"	Navjot Gulati	Navjot Gulati	9 February 2020
Making up your mind to get married is the easiest thing to do. The tough part is getting approvals from your insane friends and family. Roneet and Avni's set out to seek their family and friends approval. They also begin their wedding preparations.
3	"I Hate You (Like I Love You)"	Navjot Gulati	Navjot Gulati	15 February 2020
There's no day without night. There's no yin without yang. And there's no pyaar without takraar. Roneet and Avni go on their infamous break post their fight. While Avni is still invested in their relationship, Roneet ends up cheating on her.
4	"Ladyfingers"	Navjot Gulati	Navjot Gulati	22 February 2020
Either go big or go home. Roneet tries to make up with Avni but fails each time. Manny shares an idea with Roneet, while he shares his ladyfingers recipe. But, Avni ends up kissing Manny to make Roneet taste his own medicine.
5	"Game Over"	Navjot Gulati	Navjot Gulati	29 February 2020
Emotions and budgets are very hard to control. And no one knows this better than Roneet and Avani. Roneet finally realize that he messed up and took Avani for granted. While, they struggle to keep their wedding budget under control.
6	"Begin Again"	Navjot Gulati	Navjot Gulati	7 March 2020
Every end comes with a new beginning. Roneet and Avni finally patch up after Avni realises that Roneet is guilty for what he did. While, Roneet and Avni are eagerly for their D-day, a tragedy strikes at the wedding, leading to more chaos.
7	"Rise And Fall"	Navjot Gulati	Navjot Gulati	14 March 2020
When Avni sees Roneet's surprise, she proposes marriage toh him. Post the tradegy, the completely broke, crazy families persuade an exhausted and upset couple to get married. What will Roneet and Avni decide?
8	"The Finale"	Navjot Gulati	Navjot Gulati	21 March 2020
Our duo has been through a crazy adventure while planning their wedding. They cancel their destination wedding. After 6 months, Roneet and Avni get married in the presence of their closed ones and finally have their Happily Ever After.
