= Waah Zindagi =

Indian film directed by Dinesh S. Yadav

- Release poster
- Directed by: Dinesh S Yadav
- Written by: Suryapal Singh (Dialogues), Dinesh S Yadav, Ruhin (Screenplay).
- Produced by: Ashok H Choudhary
- Starring: Naveen Kasturia; Plabita Borthakur; Vijay Raaz; Sanjay Mishra; Ramnath Choudhary; Dharmesh Vyas; Manoj Joshi; Nakul Tiwadi
- Cinematography: Yogesh Koli
- Edited by: Paresh Kamdar
- Music by: Paag Chhabra
- Production companies: Shivazza Films & Entertainment
- Distributed by: ZEE5
- Release date: 31 December 2021
- Running time: 107 minutes
- Country: India
- Language: Hindi

Waah Zindagi (lit. 'Wow Life') is a 2021 Indian Hindi-language comedy drama film starring Naveen Kasturia, Plabita Borthakur, Vijay Raaz, Sanjay Mishra, Ramnath Choudhary, Dharmesh Vyas, Manoj Joshi, Lalit Sharma and Nakul Tiwadi. The film is based on the concept of 'Make in India'. The film premiered on 31 December 2021 on ZEE5.

== Plot ==
Besides a quirky and unconventional love story, Waah Zindagi is a journey of a destitute farmer's son struggling hard to become an entrepreneur to win his childhood sweetheart. His achievements are ravaged into failures by the mass dumping of Chinese products in the Indian Markets ruining all the Indian industries and businesses including his own. Devastated and dejected in love he gathers courage to fight and stand against China to redeem his love ending up in the Make in India initiative.

== Cast ==
- Naveen Kasturia as Ashok
- Plabita Borthakur as Reena
- Vijay Raaz as Banna
- Sanjay Mishra as Grandfather Ramkaran
- Ramnath Choudhary As Algoja Player with Nose
- Manoj Joshi as Jagat Shah
- Teetu Verma as Nanku naai
- Dharmesh Vyas as Sajjan Singh
- Lalit Sharma as Rajesh
- Nakul Tiwadi as Desai

== Filming ==
The filming was on location in Morbi village in Gujarat, rural Rajasthan, rural part of Madhya Pradesh and rural part of Maharashtra as well.

== Soundtrack ==
Waah Zindagi

Soundtrack album by Parag Chhabra
- Released: 4 November 2020
- Recorded: 2017–18
- Genre: Feature film soundtrack
- Length: 17:00
- Language: Hindi
- Label: Zee Music Company

Official audio
- Waah Zindagi - Full Album on YouTube

The film's music was composed by Parag Chhabra, while lyrics were written by Manoj Yadav and Shellee.

Track listing
No.	Title	Lyrics	Singer(s)	Length
1.	"Bhaari Bhaari"	Manoj Yadav	Mohan Kanan, Shadaab Faridi, Parag Chhabra	6:00
2.	"Jindhadi"	Shellee	Nikhita Gandhi, Parag Chhabra, Rossh	3:34
3.	"Patanga"	Shellee	Suvarna Tiwari, Gulraj Singh, Parag Chhabra	3:58
4.	"Naino"	Shellee	Jonita Gandhi, Devender Pal Singh, Parag Chhabra	3:28
Total length:				17:00

== Release ==
Initially projected to release in March 2019 by the filmmakers, the film is set to be released on over-the-top media services.
