= Autohead =

- Directed by: Rohit Mittal
- Written by: Rohit Mittal
- Produced by: Rohit Mittal, Amit Verma
- Cinematography: Sunny Banerjee
- Edited by: Avinendra Upadhyay
- Release dates: 26 March 2016 (Hong Kong International Film Festival); 4 September 2019 (India)
- Country: India
- Language: Hindi

Autohead is a 2016 film directed by Rohit Mittal.

== Cast ==
- Sampat Deepak as Narayan
- Ronjini Chakraborty as Roopa
- Vikrant Singh
- Jhanvi Dwivedi as Amma
- Ajay Mishra as Ajay
- Rohit Mittal as Director
- Sunny Banerjee as Camera Man
- Ravi Dev Singh as Sound Man
- Shivesh Dwivedi as Chaiwala / Tea Seller
- Muskan Bhamre
- Umesh Jagtap
- Adamya as Junkie
- Kamal Seth
- Falguni Rajani
- Karan Mody
- Jayant Gadekar
- Suresh Wadkar
