= The Viral Fever =

Internet video on demand service

- Company type: Subsidiary; YouTube Channel
- Website type: OTT streaming platform
- Available in: Hindi; English
- Headquarters: Mumbai
- Area served: Worldwide
- Owner: Contagious Online Media Network Private Limited
- Founder: Arunabh Kumar
- Key people: Vijay Koshy (President); Ronit Agarwal (Talent cast); Manish Saini (Executive Director)
- Industry: Entertainment; Mass media
- Products: Streaming media; Video on demand; TVFPlay
- Website: theviralfever.com
- Commercial: Yes
- Registration: Required
- Launched: 3 August 2010; 16 years ago
- Current status: Active

The Viral Fever, abbreviated to TVF, is an Indian video on demand and over-the-top media service and YouTube channel started by TVF Media Labs in 2010, and currently owned and operated by Contagious Online Media Network Private Limited. According to the founder Arunabh Kumar, the thought behind starting TVF was to reach out to the younger generation who seldom watch television entertainment.

The Viral Fever was one of the early arrivals on the Indian digital entertainment segment with videos covering a range of topics on Indian politics, movies, lifestyle, and emerging social concepts. The Viral Fever was the pioneer of web series in India with cult hits like Permanent Roommates, Hostel Daze, TVF Pitchers and TVF Tripling.

The company runs the app and website TVFPlay to host their videos. TVF conceptualised the idea of promoting movies through the creation and distribution of original digital content. The Ishq Wala song series is one such venture.

Their first web series, Permanent Roommates, debuted in 2014. It was the second most-viewed long-form web series in the world by June 2015. A second original series titled TVF Pitchers was released in June 2015. It portrays engineers at different companies who quit their jobs to create a startup company. Owing to its growing popularity, with both TVF Pitchers and Permanent Roommates being watched by millions around the globe, the company received $10 million in funding from Tiger Global in February 2016.

== Background ==
=== Early days ===
After graduating from IIT Kharagpur, Arunabh Kumar quit his job as a consultant for Red Chillies Entertainment to try his hand at production jobs, including assisting Farah Khan on Om Shanti Om.

Kumar, along with long-time friends and fellow IIT alumni, Amit Golani, and Biswapati Sarkar began pitching shows targeting young people to MTV. Faced with rejection, The Viral Fever was founded when the group came together and released a video titled Rowdies on YouTube starring Deepak Kumar Mishra and Naveen Kasturia. The runaway success of the video prompted Arunabh to create the YouTube-focused video company, The Viral Fever, in 2012.

After a few years of creating "viral videos", The Viral Fever released India's first web series, Permanent Roommates, in 2014.

TVF debuted their own platform, TVFPlay, releasing the final two episodes of Pitchers. The platform saw 10 lakh (1 million) hits in the first two days and crashed for 3 hours. In early 2016, venture capital firm Tiger Global invested $10 million into TVF, acquiring a 20% stake in the company.

== Content ==
=== The Making Of... (2014) ===
Focused on the making of entertainment products in India, ranging from a blockbuster movie to a decade long TV soap. The first season of The Making Of... comprised five episodes, with a standalone episode released for Season 2 in 2016.

=== Permanent Roommates (since 2014) ===
Permanent Roommates is an Indian web series created by TVF and Biswapati Sarkar. This series revolves around a young couple, Tanya and Mikesh, who after being in a long-distance relationship for 3 years, face the prospect of marriage. The first season was released on YouTube on 31 October 2014.

=== Barely Speaking with Arnub (since 2014) ===
Barely Speaking with Arnub returned for a shortened season two in 2016. The show has been on hold as writer Biswapati Sarkar focuses on writing web series including the sequel to TVF Pitchers.

=== TVF Pitchers (2015-present) ===
TVF Pitchers is an Indian web series created by TVF and developed by Arunabh Kumar single-handedly with assisting efforts from others. The first season consists of five episodes and premiered online on TVFPlay on 10 June 2015. A week later, on 17 June, it premiered on YouTube. The season finale premiered on TVFPlay on 30 August 2015. It follows four friends, Naveen, Jitu, Yogi and Mandal, who quit their jobs in order to develop their own start-up company.

In 2016, TVF announced December 2017 as the projected release of Season 2 of Pitchers with the last scene of Permanent Roommates, but it failed to materialise later. Later, TVF hinted at the release of the second season of TVF Pitchers by uploading a scene in their YouTube video "Shows From The House Of TVF | 2021".

=== TVF Tripling (2016–2022) ===
TVF Tripling is an Asian television award-winning Indian web series created by TVF. It traces the story of three siblings Chandan, Chanchal & Chitvan. Together they start a hilarious journey, to find themselves and their relations. Starring Sumeet Vyas, Maanvi Gagroo and Amol Parashar, and written by Sumeet Vyas and Akarsh Khurana, along with some other contributions, the series has won several awards, including a Kyoorius Blue Elephant. TVF partnered with Tata Motors for the project to promote the newly launched Tata Tiago. TVF Tripling was recognised as one of the best web-series of 2016 and is a benchmark of success in Indian branded content. The second season of the series was released on 5 April 2019 aired through SonyLIV, followed by the third season which premiered on 21 October 2022, as a ZEE5 exclusive.

=== Tech Conversations With Dad (since 2014) ===
An ongoing TVF series about Jeetu (Jitendra Kumar) and his conversations with his father (Gajraj Rao), often about technology, relationships, and families in India. This is TVF's longest-running digital title with 10 videos in 4 years.

=== Humorously Yours (since 2016) ===
Long-time TVF writer, and stand-up comic Vipul Goyal featured in a semi-autobiographical story about the life of a stand-up comic. The show furthered TVF's reputation for story-telling in the Indian context. Humorously Yours was renewed for a second season, released in 2019. The show returned for a third season as a part of ZEE5 original programming. It premiered in December 2023.

=== F.A.T.H.E.R.S. (2017) ===
A Tech Conversations with Dad spin-off, Fathers features three veterans of the Indian television screen, Brijendra Kala, Gajraj Rao, and Atul Srivastava, playing three fathers trying to keep up with the times.

=== Bachelors (since 2016) ===
Bachelors is a show about four bachelors who live together and encounter hilarious situations as they face the world after college. In 2016, TVF released a pilot episode of Bachelors, featuring popular YouTube star Bhuvan Bam. The success of the pilot led to a 4-episode extension with Bam and over 25 million views. Bachelors was picked up for Season 2, released in late 2017, with Jitendra Kumar replacing Bhuvan Bam as the lead. Season 2 has also crossed 25 million views since release and was listed among the best web-series of 2017 by FilmCompanion and The Indian Express, and was applauded by various sects of audience for its satirical timing, and spoofs of popular Bollywood movies such as Dangal, Bahubali and Chak De! India among many others.

=== The Aam Aadmi Family (2016) ===
The Aam Aadmi Family is a project released from TVF's sister channel The Timeliners. It is an album of moments from the life of a middle-class family based in Delhi. It has garnered an average of 8 million views across 3 seasons.

=== Flames (2018) ===
Flames is another project from TVF's sister channel The Timeliners. It is the story of a young romance unfolding as a chemical reaction. Studious Rajat falls for Ishita, the new girl in the tuition. Rajat's friends, Pandey & Anusha's friendship is beginning to turn into a relationship. The equations of friendships evolve in the first season of this teenage romance. This series has already garnered an average of 5 million views.

=== Yeh Meri Family (2018) ===
Yeh Meri Family is a mini-series released by TVF. It is about a nuclear-middle-class family living in the height of fad of the 1990s. The story revolves around a 13-year-old boy who is average at academics and is constantly being bullied and blackmailed by his elder brother. It is a mixture of the drama and thrills of being a teenager.

=== ImMature (2018) ===
ImMature is a TVF original released in 2019. It stars Omkar Kulkarni, Rashmi Agdekar, Chinmay Chandranushush and Visshesh Tiwari in the lead roles. The show follows a one-conflict-per-episode format that ties into the protagonist Dhruv's larger quest to befriend his love interest Chhavi.

=== Kota Factory (2019-present) ===
Kota Factory is a TVF original released in 2019. The series moves around the IIT and Medical entrance coaching industry of Kota, a small town in Rajasthan state of India. It focuses on the life of Vaibhav, who leaves his home town and arrives in Kota to pursue coaching for the preparation of IIT Exam. The series portrays the life of an IIT aspirant during his preparation phase, and also focuses on the different sides of the 'Kota Coaching Industry'. It has been directed by Saurabh Khanna. Kota Factory is one of the first Indian black-and-white web series on YouTube.

=== Gullak (2019-present) ===
Gullak is a web series that revolves around the life stories of the "Mishra Family", talking tales relatable to a common man's everyday life. The series was created by Shreyansh Pandey. The first season, released on 27 June 2019 on TVF Play and SonyLIV was directed by the critically acclaimed director of many popular web stories, Amrit Raj Gupta. The second season was directed by Palash Vaswani and was aired on the OTT platform SonyLIV in 2021. The third season starring the same star-cast released in April 2022 to wide critical acclaim. The show was renewed for a fourth season in 2024 on the OTT platform SonyLIV. This series features Jameel Khan, Geetanjali Kulkarni, Vaibhav Raj Gupta and Shivankit Singh Parihar.

=== Cubicles (2019-present) ===
Cubicles is centered around the life of Piyush, a fresh entrant into the corporate world. The show follows his work life and moments like his very first salary, working weekends, and failures and successes that are a part of anyone's corporate journey. Simultaneously, the series attempts to integrate fundamental concepts of investing and mutual funds into the story. Created by Amit Golani and directed by Chaitanya Kumbhakonum, the series stars Abhishek Chauhan, Nidhi Bisht, Arnav Bhasin, Shivankit Singh Parihar, and Badri Chavan, among others.

=== Hostel Daze (2019–2023) ===
Hostel Daze was created by TVF, and is a compilation of stories depicting the lifestyle and fun of undergraduates who live in a hostel, along with the bullying of seniors being one of their many experiences with the hostel and its residents. The series was released on Amazon Prime Video on 13 December 2019. The entire series was shot in the campus and hostel of Symbiosis International University, Pune. The series was written and created by Saurabh Khanna and Abhishek Yadav, and was directed by Raghav Subbu, critically acclaimed for directing TVF's series Kota Factory. The series features Adarsh Gourav, Shubham Gaur and LUV in key roles of three freshers, and also casts Nikhil Vijay, Badri Chavan and Harsha Chemudu among many others.

=== Panchayat (2020-present) ===
Panchayat is a web series produced by TVF, released on Amazon Prime on 3 April 2020. This critically acclaimed web series revolves around the Panchayat of a village called Phulera in Ballia district of Eastern Uttar Pradesh, The series features Jitendra Kumar, who plays the role of a young graduate and the secretary of the Panchayat of the village, who is constantly at war with himself, trying to adapt himself to the lifestyle of the villagers, while keeping his dream of cracking the CAT. The series also features veteran actors like Raghubir Yadav and Neena Gupta. The series marked the debut for Chandan Roy as an actor, playing the role of assistant secretary of the Panchayat. His work is being praised by many cinema critics.

On 28 April 2022, the second season was announced after the completion of the production. On 2 May 2022, it was announced that the second season will premiere on 20 May 2022. However, Prime Video released all the episodes on 18 May 2022, two days earlier than its actual premiere date.

Deepak Kumar Mishra revealed to social media that there would be a third season of Panchayat. It was later confirmed that season 3 would involve eight episodes and would be released in late 2023 on Amazon Prime Video. This was further delayed to early 2024. On 28 May 2024, the third season was released.

On 3 April 2025, marking the fifth anniversary of the series, the makers announced that its fourth season will premiere on 24 June 2025.

=== Chosen Few (2020) ===
A short film following the story of Abhay Joshi, a fearless cop and a NGO runner give their effort to rescue underage girls from the filthy mud of human trafficking with help of Sani, who is rescued by the cop. It was released on 21 April 2020 on YouTube and TVFPlay.

=== TVF Aspirants (2021-present) ===
TVF Aspirants is a web series that depicts the life of UPSC aspirants who are living in Rajender Nagar, Delhi. This series features Naveen Kasturia, Shivankit Parihar, Abhilash Thapliyal and Sunny Hinduja in the lead roles, along with Namita Dubey and Bijou Thaangjam. It is the most rated IMDB webseries of India The show was created by Arunabh Kumar and Shreyansh Pandey, written by Deepesh Sumitra Jagdish, and directed by Apoorv Singh Karki.

=== Engga Hostel (2023) ===
Engga Hostel is a web series produced by TVF, released on Amazon Prime on 27 January 2023. It is an official Tamil-language remake of the Hindi-language series Hostel Daze.

=== SK Sir Ki Class (2023) ===
SK Sir Ki Class is a 3-episode spinoff series that follows the character Shwetketu "SK" Jha from Aspirants. It features Abhilash Thapliyal and Gagan Arora as main characters. It premiered on Youtube on 21 February 2023.

=== Sandeep Bhaiya (2023) ===
Sandeep Bhaiya is a 5-episode spinoff series that follows the character of Sandeep Singh Ohlan from Aspirants. It features Sunny Hinduja as the titlular character. It premiered on YouTube on 30 June 2023, and the final episode aired on 14 July 2023.

=== Half CA (2023-present) ===
The series revolves around the challenges and experiences faced by Chartered Accountancy students in India. It sheds light on the struggles, aspirations, and intricate lives of these students, as they navigate through the demanding journey of becoming a Chartered Accountant. It mainly focus on the lives of Neeraj and Archie and the challenges faced by them as CA students. It premiered on Amazon miniTV on 25 July 2023.

=== Very Parivarik (2024-2025) ===
The show revolves around a couple that shifts to the fast-paced city of Mumbai and deals with the complexities of living with their parents after they move in with them. Because of its ubiquitous themes and relatable scenarios, the TVF show has earned praise from viewers nationwide.

=== Space Gen: Chandrayaan (2026) ===
It is an Indian web series, that dramatizes the real-life events behind India's lunar exploration program.

=== Hello Bachhon (2026) ===
Hello Bachhon, a 5-episode biographical web-series directed by Pratish Mehta, featuring Vineet Kumar Singh in the titular role of Alakh Pandey, premiered on March 6, 2026, on Netflix.

=== The Vvaan: Force of the Forrest (2026) ===
The film, directed by Deepak Kumar Mishra, features Sidharth Malhotra and Tamannaah Bhatia in lead roles. The film is co-produced by Balaji Motion Pictures and 11:11 Productions.

== Members ==
As of 2023, the TVF Group has a total team of more than 150 members in Mumbai and Delhi. However, per credible media reports, some of the key members from the core team of TVF walked out in August 2020. Some of the notable members are:

- Arunabh Kumar
- Shivankit Singh Parihar

== Controversy ==
In March 2017, Arunabh Kumar found himself in the middle of a sexual harassment claim that was posted anonymously via Medium. Several women have come out with similar stories of harassment. TVF released a press release via Medium refuting the claims.

Mumbai's Versova Police registered a second FIR against Kumar after another woman filed a complaint against him over an incident she said took place in 2014. On 16 June 2017, Kumar stepped down as TVF CEO. Dhawal Gusain now leads the company as CEO, with Karan Chaudhry stepping in as COO and Sameer Saxena, the creator of Permanent Roommates & Tripling, appointed as CCO.

== See also ==
- East India Comedy
- All India Bakchod
- Amazon Prime Video
- Sony Liv
