= Dus June Kii Raat =

Indian TV series

- Promotional release poster
- Genre: Drama
- Created by: Ekta Kapoor
- Screenplay by: Ranveer Pratap Singh
- Story by: Vibhuti Upadhyay
- Directed by: Tabrez Khan
- Starring: Tusshar Kapoor; Priyanka Chahar Choudhary Shaan Groverr
- Composer: Sanchit Choudhary
- Country of origin: India
- Original language: Hindi
- No. of seasons: 2
- No. of episodes: 23

Production
- Producers: Sachin Mohite; Ekta Kapoor
- Cinematography: Sachin Patekar
- Running time: 30 minutes
- Production companies: Balaji Telefilms; Jaasvand Entertainment

Original release
- Network: JioCinema
- Release: 4 August 2024

Dus June Kii Raat is an Indian Hindi-language crime drama television series directed by Tabrez Khan. Produced by Jaasvand Entertainment and Balaji Telefilms, starring Tusshar Kapoor and Priyanka Chahar Choudhary. It premiered on JioCinema on 4 August 2024. The second season premiered on 30 October 2024, with the cast reprising their roles

== Synopsis ==
A tale of Panauti, a hapless young man with notorious bad luck, and his quest to reopen his father's theatre. Packed with hilarious misadventures and colorful characters, his journey with cousin Battu for love and luck is a hilarious journey of fun, laughter and unintended consequences.

== Cast ==
- Tusshar Kapoor as Panauti
- Priyanka Chahar Choudhary as Puppy
- Shaan R. Grover as Battu
- Sumit Arora
- Bijou Thaangjam as Gogoi
- Rohit Gill
- Ravi Chauhan as Jacky

== Production ==
The principal photography of the series commenced in January 2024. The filming of the series concluded in March 2024. The trailer of the series was released on 26 July 2024.

== Reception ==
Archika Khurana of The Times of India rated the series 2/5 stars. Mimansa Shekhar of Times Now gave the series 2/5 stars.
