= Bijou Thaangjam =

Indian actor, lyricist, art director and chef

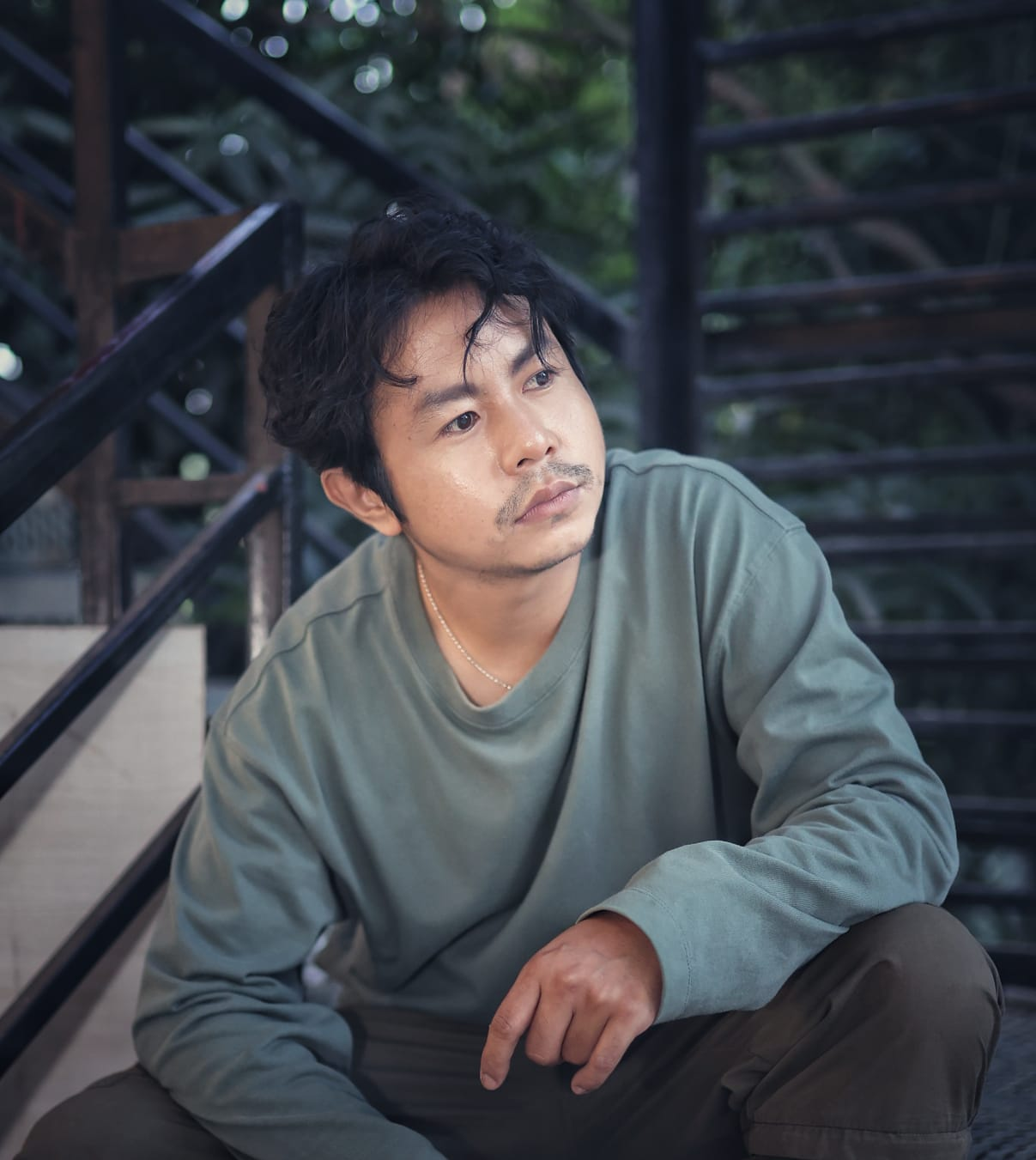
- Born: Thangjam Biju Singh; 24 March 1986 (age 40); Imphal, Manipur, India
- Occupations: Actor, Lyricist, Art Director & Chef
- Years active: 2011-present

Bijou Thaangjam (born Thangjam Biju Singh) is an Indian actor, lyricist, art director, chef and entrepreneur. He is of Meitei descent originally from Imphal, Manipur. He was one of the contestants on the reality cooking competition MasterChef India 2. He is known for his role in the film Mary Kom and Shivaay.

== Masterchef India ==
Bijou Thaangjam competed on the Star Plus reality cooking competition, Masterchef India. He was one of the Top 50 contestants of Masterchef India 2011.

== Career ==
Bijou Thaangjam first appeared as a contestant on the reality cooking competition MasterChef India 2. He later debuted as an actor and a lyricist in Omung Kumar's Mary Kom (film) (2014) starring Priyanka Chopra as Mary Kom.

He played the role 'Kancha' in Shivaay (2016) which is a Hindi film directed and produced by Ajay Devgan.

He was also seen in successful films like Jagga Jasoos, Paltan, Happy Phirr Bhag Jayegi, Vodka Diaries, III Smoking Barrels and Penalty.

He also debuted as an Art Director in III Smoking Barrels which earned him a nomination for Best Art Director in Prag Cine Awards 2018.

He has also worked in films like Om The Battle Within and Rocketry: The Nambi Effect which is set for commercial release later in 2022.

Beside films, he acted in web series for various companies like ALT Balaji where he worked in a series The Test Case (web series). Apart from that, he was seen in Netflix show Typewriter directed by Sujoy Ghosh and Bi-Lingual Webseries Kark Rogue for Zee5 and Flesh (web series) for Eros Now.

In 2021 he was seen in a Sony Liv web series Love J Action, Disney+ Hotstar's 1962: The War In The Hills and TVF Original TVF Aspirants.

== Filmography ==
=== Film ===
Year	Title	Role	Refs
2014	Mary Kom	Naobi	
2016	Shivaay	Kancha	
2017	Jagga Jasoos		
2018	Vodka Diaries		
2018	Happy Phirr Bhag Jayegi	Chinese Agent	
2018	Paltan	Chinese Army	
2018	III Smoking Barrels	Drug Dealer	
2019	Penalty	Bijou	
2019	Made in China	Chinese Official	
2021	Jamun	Dr. Lama	
2021	Zindagi inShort	Singer	
2021	Swaaha	Singer	
2022	Rocketry: The Nambi Effect	Studio Personnel	
2022	Rashtra Kavach Om	Militant Boss	
2022	Lembi Leima	Nando	
2022	Lakadbaggha	Shopkeeper	
2023	Ouraiyu	The Man	
2024	Bade Miyan Chote Miyan	Chinese Reporter	
2024	Chilli Chicken	Khaba Meitei	

=== Television ===
Title	Role	Channel
MasterChef India	Contestant	Star Plus
Superstar Santa	Himself	UTV Stars
Dil Dosti Dance	Karma Wangchuk's Brother	Channel V India
TRAFFIC	Joseph	MTV India
Code Red	Raghav	Colors TV

=== Web series ===
Year	Title	Role	Platform
2018	The Test Case	Tej Bahadur Thapa	ALT Balaji
2019	Typewriter	Sushant Singh	Netflix
2020	Kark Rogue	Max	Zee5
2020	The Forgotten Army - Azaadi Ke Liye	Japanese Soldier	Amazon Prime
2020	Flesh	Bali	Eros Now
2021	1962: The War in the Hills	Chinese Soldier	Disney Plus Hotstar
2021	Love J Action	Chang Man	SonyLIV
2021	TVF Aspirants	Pema Rijiju	TVF
2022	Mukhbir - The Story of a Spy	Junior Officer	Zee5
2024	Dus June Kii Raat	Gogoi	JioCinema

=== As producer ===
Year	Title	Role	Cast	Platform
2022	Roll The Dice	Music Video	Naveen Jagbir Sandhu, Rima Khaidem	YouTube
2022	Bewafa	Music Video	Prateek Balhara, Raju Kumar Mukhiya	YouTube
2022	Lembi Leima	Short Film	Bijou Thaangjam, Bala Hijam, Naveen Jagbir Sandhu	
2023	Bit Of Heaven	Short Film	Naveen Jagbir Sandhu	
2023	Ouraiyu	Short Film	Bijou Thaangjam	YouTube
2024	Before I Leave You Again	Short Film	Rohit Giri, Angobi Chanu	
2025	The Taste Of Dreams	Short Film	Luwang Yumlembam, Atila Lairikyengbam, Edhou	
2025	The Last Step	Short Film	Rabina Kolom, Daina Laitonjam	YouTube
2025	Chalk & Chain	Short Film	Avi Khundrakpam, Bobo Hayum	

== Awards and nominations ==
Year	Film	Award	Category	Result
2018	III Smoking Barrels	Prag Cine Awards	Best Art Director	Nominated
2022	Lembi Leima	Kollywood International Film Festival, KIFF	Best Supporting Actor	Won
2022	Lembi Leima	Athvikvaruni International Film Festival, AIFF	Best Supporting Actor	Won
2022	Lembi Leima	Sitannavasal International Film Festival, SIFF	Best Supporting Actor	Won
2022	Lembi Leima	Northeast India International Film Festival, NIIFF	Best Supporting Actor	Nominated
2023	Lembi Leima	Madras Independent Film Festival, MIFF	Best Supporting Actor	Nominated
