= Mithya (TV series) =

Indian drama web series

- Promotional Poster
- Genre: Psychological thriller; Drama
- Created by: Gabby Hull
- Based on: Cheat by Gaby Hull
- Written by: Purva Naresh
- Directed by: Season 1: Rohan Sippy; Season 2: Kapil Sharma
- Starring: Huma Qureshi; Avantika Dassani; Parambrata Chatterjee
- Music by: Nirmal pandya S2 & Ripul sharma S1
- Country of origin: India
- Original language: Hindi
- No. of seasons: 2
- No. of episodes: 12 (list of episodes)

Production
- Producers: Goldie Behl; Shradha Behl Singh
- Cinematography: Sirsha Ray
- Production companies: Applause Entertainment; Rose Audio Visuals

Original release
- Release: 18 February 2022 – present

Mithya is an Indian Hindi-language, psychological thriller drama web series streaming on ZEE5. It is directed by Rohan Sippy and produced by Applause Entertainment and Rose Audio Visual Production. The series, which is originally based on Web series Cheat 2019, was released on 18 February 2022 and stars Huma Qureshi, Avantika Dassani, Parambrata Chatterjee, Rajit Kapur and Samir Soni in pivotal roles. The series is adapted from the British television show Cheat! Avantika Dassani made her acting debut with this series. The drama was exclusively shot in St. Paul's School, Darjeeling. Following the conclusion of the first season, a second season, titled Mithya: The Darker Chapter, was announced in October 2024 and premiered on 1 November 2024. Actor Naveen Kasturia joined the cast in a pivotal role.

== Plot ==
=== Season 1 ===
Set against the picturesque backdrop of Darjeeling, this is a dark and twisted tale of truth and deception laced with numerous secrets and lies. It all starts when Juhi Adhikari, a righteous Hindi Literature professor, accuses her student, Rhea Rajguru of plagiarism in her Literature essay.

Rhea, who is the daughter of one of the top college benefactors doesn’t take this well and sets out on a journey of vengeance and violence, destroying everything in her path. What happens when an obsessed and impulsive Rhea turns Juhi’s world upside down is what follows the rest of the story.

=== Season 2 ===
Rhea, played by Avantika Dassani, continues her quest for revenge. Discovering that Anand Tyagi is her father, she sets out to win his approval.

When Rhea finally meets Anand, she attempts to prove she's not as bad as he might think. She explains that she wasn’t actually kidnapping Yash, Juhi’s son, but was instead trying to rescue him from danger.

== Cast ==
- Huma Qureshi as Juhi Adhikari, Hindi professor
- Avantika Dassani as Rhea Rajguru, student
- Parambrata Chatterjee as Neil Adhikari, Juhi's husband
- Rajit Kapur as Anand Tyagi, Juhi's father
- Avantika Akerkar as Sudha, Juhi's mother
- Samir Soni as Rajguru, Rhea's father
- Indraneil Sengupta as Vishal
- Naina Sareen as Sharmistha

=== Season 2 ===
- Naveen Kasturia as Amit Chaudhary
- Anindita Bose as Mansi Mehra
- Rushad Rana as Vikas
- Krishna Bisht as Arun aka Ronnie
- Mahendra Bagda as Jeth Bahadur

== Release ==
ZEE5 announced the launch of a trailer on 8 February 2022 and the series was released on 18 February 2022. The second season was released on ZEE5 on 1 November 2024.

== Series overview ==
Series	Episodes	Originally released
1	6	18 February 2022
2	6	1 November 2024

== Episode list ==
=== Season 1 (2022) ===
No. overall	No. in season	Title	Directed by	Written by	Original release date
1	1	"Maine Dekhi Hai Uski Mrityu"	Rohan Sippy	Purva Naresh	18 February 2022
Juhi, Rhea's Hindi literature professor, has suspicions about Rhea cheating on her term essay and ultimately decides to fail her. In a twist, Rhea cunningly persuades Arun, the hostel security guard, to reveal Juhi's address for her own purposes.
2	2	"Nishaane Pe Sirf Main Thi"	Rohan Sippy	Purva Naresh	18 February 2022
Juhi and Neil's relationship starts to unravel, creating tension between them. Meanwhile, Juhi and Rhea's rivalry escalates and becomes widely known after Juhi intentionally embarrasses Rhea during class. In an unexpected turn, Rhea decides to visit Juhi's house, where she encounters Neil.
3	3	"Sach Ke Kai Pehlu"	Rohan Sippy	Purva Naresh	18 February 2022
Juhi's suspicions about Rhea intensify when she discovers that her wedding ring is missing. To her shock, she sees Rhea wearing the very ring she thought lost. Fueled by anger, Juhi confronts Rhea aggressively at the Founder’s Day party. This explosive incident leads to a significant confrontation between Juhi and Neil, resulting in a major argument between the two.
4	4	"Sach Ki Tarah Log Bhi Complex Hote Hain"	Rohan Sippy	Purva Naresh	18 February 2022
Juhi experiences profound emotional turmoil and turns to her parents for support during this difficult time. Meanwhile, Anand drops by to see Rhea, who takes advantage of the situation. While Juhi is preoccupied at her parents' anniversary party, Rhea slyly seduces Neil, further complicating the already strained relationships.
5	5	"Hum Sab Mein Ek Cheat Hota Hai"	Rohan Sippy	Purva Naresh	18 February 2022
Neil reveals to Juhi a picture he found in his pocket, prompting her to confront Anand about its origins. During this confrontation, Anand admits the truth about Rhea, unveiling secrets that leave Juhi reeling. Meanwhile, Rhea takes the opportunity to share her past with Neil, deepening their connection. When Juhi returns home, she is met with a shocking sight that forces her to confront the turmoil in her life head-on.
6	6	"Tum Phool Si, Main Kaante Si"	Rohan Sippy	Purva Naresh	18 February 2022
Sunanda becomes convinced that there’s more to Rhea’s story and decides to investigate further into her life. In a tense confrontation, Anand successfully gets Rhea to confess to her wrongdoing. Meanwhile, Rhea, desperate to make amends, attempts to reach out to Juhi. However, her efforts are met with disappointment as Juhi rejects her, leaving Rhea’s hopes for reconciliation in tatters.

=== Season 2 (2024) ===
No. overall	No. in season	Title	Directed by	Written by	Original release date
7	1	"Chehre Pe Chehra"	Kapil Sharma	Purva Naresh, Nishank Verma, Nisarg Mehta, Aparna Nadig	1 November 2024
Amit Chaudhary accuses Juhi of plagiarism, and Juhi suspects Rhea is the one behind it. At the same time, Rhea’s hopes of inheriting the Rajguru estate are threatened. Meanwhile, Anand is on the verge of discovering a startling truth.
8	2	"We Are Family"	Kapil Sharma	Purva Naresh, Nishank Verma, Nisarg Mehta, Aparna Nadig	1 November 2024
Amit sends Juhi a legal notice through Anand. When Anand tries to meet with Amit to settle the issue, his efforts only make things worse. Meanwhile, Rhea uncovers details about Juhi's past with Vishal.
9	3	"The Darkest Hour"	Kapil Sharma	Purva Naresh, Nishank Verma, Nisarg Mehta, Aparna Nadig	1 November 2024
Juhi discovers that Anand confessed to Amit about the plagiarism. To shield him, she publicly takes the blame. Overcome with guilt, Anand apologizes to both Juhi and Rhea before making a drastic decision.
10	4	"I Will Never Stop"	Kapil Sharma	Purva Naresh, Nishank Verma, Nisarg Mehta, Aparna Nadig	1 November 2024
Juhi investigates the truth behind the plagiarism allegations, while Rhea looks for Yash's biological father. When Yash goes missing, Juhi becomes suspicious of Rhea and brings the police to the Rajguru estate.
11	5	"Jo Karna Tha, Mujhe Karna Tha"	Kapil Sharma	Purva Naresh, Nishank Verma, Nisarg Mehta, Aparna Nadig	1 November 2024
Arun's obsession puts Yash in danger, prompting Rhea and Amit to confront him. After hearing about Yash's death, Juhi is admitted to a mental health facility. Meanwhile, Amit grows increasingly wary of Rhea's ambitions.
12	6	"Tum Aur Main Alag Nahi"	Kapil Sharma	Purva Naresh, Nishank Verma, Nisarg Mehta, Aparna Nadig	1 November 2024
Amit informs Juhi that Yash is alive and with Rhea. Juhi then deceives Rhea into searching for Yash at the Rajguru estate. In a final confrontation, Juhi manages to turn the tables on Rhea.

== Reception ==
=== Critical reviews ===
==== Season 1 ====
The series opened to mixed to positive reviews. Archika Khurana of The Times of India has given 3/5 stars stating that Huma Qureshi and Avantika Dassani's intense performances make this psychodrama an addictive thriller. All the actors made justice with their characters in terms of performance. The Darjeeling's picturesque grandeur, with overcast rains, weather, and the greenery of the Himalayan foothills, added beauty to the screenplay. The background score is effective.

Devarsi Ghosh of Hindustan Times stated that the web series should have been a tight little naughty 90-minute murder mystery. Instead of a stretched 180-minute which is the nearly same length as the British series Cheat. Series direction was in a state of nervous excitement, and anything with emotional gravity will drag Sippy down. It is watchable because of the actors' performances.

Shubhra Gupta of The Indian Express stated that Huma Qureshi and Avantika Dassani thriller locks in long-term guilt, and a burning desire for revenge makes it great companions for a story like this one. The tale of fatal attractions leaves us poised on an uneasy cliff-hanger and interested for another season.

==== Season 2 ====
Yatamanyu Narain of News 18 rated it three out of five stars noting that "As a psychological thriller, the series excels in depicting the darker impulses of its characters, painting the bonds of family and ambition in shadowed hues."

Kunal Kothari of iwmbuzz also gave three out of five and wrote that "It delivers on its promise of mystery and intrigue, offering a solid continuation of the original story with a fresh twist on familiar themes. While some of the plot’s shocking moments may not have the intended effect, and the pacing could use tightening, the suspenseful plot, the beauty and mystery of Darjeeling, and the powerful performances make it a worthwhile watch for fans of psychological thrillers."

Rahul Desai of Hollywood Reporter India stated that "Mithya: The Darker Chapter is a grand celebration of mediocrity, a lost marble that masquerades as a fiery planet barrelling through the cinematic solar system in defiance of gravity and logic."
