= Vipul Goyal =

Indian stand up comedian

- Education: IIT Bombay
- Spouse: Nancy Gupta Goyal

Comedy career
- Years active: 2012–present
- Medium: Stand-Up Comedy
- Genres: Satire, observational comedy, improvisational comedy

Vipul Goyal is an Indian stand-up comedian and actor. He is counted among the top comedy performers in India and also plays the main protagonist in the web-series Humorously Yours. The show is produced by The Viral Fever and depicts a semi-autobiographical account of his life interspersed with standup clips. Vipul is the only Indian comedian with a dedicated show of his own, with more than 70 million views on his online videos across various platforms (as of August 2017). The show revolves around his struggles of becoming a comedian and season 2 depicts the life after his success. He is often called the Indian Seinfeld as he does some observational comedy.

== Early life ==
Vipul was born in Falna Pali Marwar in Rajasthan, India. He studied electrical engineering at the Indian Institute of Technology Bombay. He has been involved in theatre during college life. He was also a part of "Love in December", along with Nitin Gupta. He was greatly inspired by Indian stand-up comedian of The Great Indian Laughter Challenge fame, Sunil Pal.

== Career ==
Goyal is a pioneer of clean comedy and his content is based on topics like Indian dads, Facebook, engineering, Sachin Tendulkar, Indian trains, dating, management, and politics.

He is regularly invited to media forums for discussions on the Indian standup scene or his hilarious takes on current affairs.

He regularly performs at colleges and companies all over the country and went on his first official tour starting in late 2016 which continued into 2017.
