= Faadu (TV series) =

Hindi language romance-drama web series

- Genre: Drama
- Written by: Saumya Joshi
- Directed by: Ashwiny Iyer Tiwari
- Starring: Pavail Gulati; Saiyami Kher; Abhilash Thapliyal
- Music by: Santhosh Narayanan
- Country of origin: India
- Original language: Hindi
- No. of seasons: 1
- No. of episodes: 11

Production
- Producer: Indranil Chakraborty
- Editor: Chandrashekhar Prajapati
- Production companies: Clockwork Films; Studio NEXT

Original release
- Network: SonyLIV
- Release: 9 December 2022

Faadu is an Indian Hindi language romance-drama web series, directed by Ashwiny Iyer Tiwari and produced by StudioNext. It is written by Saumya Joshi and is based on the journey of a man rising from poverty to lead an extraordinary life, while tackling many questions that life throws at him. The show stars Pavail Gulati and Saiyami Kher.

The show was streaming exclusively on SonyLIV.

== Cast ==
- Pavail Gulati as Abhay, Manjiri's husband
- Saiyami Kher as Manjiri, Abhay's wife
- Abhilash Thapliyal
- Gunjan Joshi
- Daya Shankar Pandey
- Ajay Raju as Chawl Boy

== Summary ==
Faadu is a story of a man belonging to progressive India who lies in the middle of choices that need validation. He is stuck between the fabric of economic upgrade and true love. Abhay is an angry poet and dreamer who aspires to be the hero of his rags-to-riches story, in no time. In this ambitious journey of need and greed, he falls in love with Manjiri, a poet with a different life philosophy. In an era of people running behind their ambitious selves, will Abhay choose love and simplicity or lean towards money and complexity? Faadu attempts to answer this very quest of mankind - ‘It does not matter where you are born. Your destiny lies in your hands.' But what if our self-written destiny goes completely wrong and you want to return to where it all started?

== Episodic synopsis ==
No.	Title	Episode Synopsis	Originally aired
1	Diamond In The Rough	Abhay from a cramped ghetto in Mumbai meets Manjiri from Konkan in college. An unknown poetic love story journey begins.	9 December 2022
2	Starry Night	A fearless Abhay runs behind his uncertain dreams and his appetite for risky plans overwhelms Manjiri when he meets Ratan Kinkhwabwala.	9 December 2022
3	The Dice	Abhay is enamored by Ratan's personality and makes a drastic plan confronting his brother Roxy. Manjri succumbs to Abhay's chaotic passion and experiences Ratan's world which unravels a contrasting story.	9 December 2022
4	A Crossing	Manjiri navigates an unknown journey with Abhay as he makes a bold plan to win at Ratan's gambling den. In the crossfire of love and ambition, a life lesson jolts Abhay.	9 December 2022
5	Like A Sore Thumb	Manjri witnesses Abhay's entrepreneurial hunger in the most unexpected situation as he carefully plans an accident and gets his first big client. Glory and battle await.	9 December 2022
6	First Blood	Abhay's passion is fueled when he earns his first cheque from Businessman Dhirendra Patel. Manjri witnesses his undying dream becoming a reality and also a fear.	9 December 2022
7	Familiar Stranger	Abhay and Manjiri explore and adjust changing personalities in an upgraded life. Abhay accidentally meets Rohington Udeshi who paves way to his bigger goals. The dominos effect begins.	9 December 2022
8	Sunset Point	Abhay manipulates his way to reach Anant Udeshi. His fervent quest to become super-rich and Manjiri's idealistic way of life creates an unfamiliarity between them; An overwhelming revelation scars Manjiri to take a decision.	9 December 2022
9	Daisies In The Desert	In the quietness of Konkan, Manjiri processes the present connection with Abhay who encounters a dilemma to choose his loyalty between dissolute Anant Udeshi and his trusted friend Tukaram.	9 December 2022
10.	Dizzy At The Mountain Top	Manjiri and Abhay reconvene in Konkan; Manjiri finds her answer in self-reflection and Abhay leaves with haunting unanswered questions.	9 December 2022
11.	End Of The Tunnel	After a tragic event, Abhay reevaluates his self-destructive, complicated life. He takes a bold step against Anant Udeshi and vows to return stronger for the sake of Manjri.	9 December 2022

== Reception ==
Firstpost opines Faadu as a brilliant study of love, poetry, ambition, and more, with Pavail and Saiyami being beyond brilliant in their roles. Director Ashwini Iyer Tiwari is receiving applauds for her "artful creation", and Saumya Joshi for his "exceptionally evocative" writing. The music of the show as well as the supporting cast have gathered special mentions and rightly so.

Scroll acclaims the show as a clutter-breaker and calls it "a soaring tale of vaulting ambition". It lauds the direction of Ashwini Iyer Tiwari against the beautifully captured landscape and a "true-to-meter" script by Saumya Joshi, with exceptional performances by the leads and a few noticeable characters.

The show has received a 4-star rating from DNA, and acclamations have poured in for director Ashwini Iyer Tiwari for the “honesty and conviction” - the series reflects. Every character leaves an impact in this "thought-provoking and touching" love story.
