= Sulemani Keeda =

- Directed by: Amit V Masurkar
- Written by: Amit V Masurkar
- Produced by: Datta Dave; Chaitanya Hegde; Deepa Tracy; Sailesh Dave; Suresh Mhatre
- Starring: Naveen Kasturia; Mayank Tewari; Aditi Vasudev; Karan Mirchandani
- Cinematography: Surjodeep Ghosh
- Edited by: Khushboo Agarwal Raj
- Music by: Arfaaz-Anurag
- Production companies: Tulsea Pictures; Mantra/Runaway Entertainment
- Distributed by: PVR Director's Rare
- Release dates: 22 October 2013 (Mumbai); 5 December 2014
- Running time: 89 minutes
- Country: India
- Language: Hindi

Sulemani Keeda (transl. A crazy urge) is a 2013 Indian independent Hindi-language slacker comedy film directed by Amit V Masurkar and produced by Tulsea Pictures in association with Mantra/Runaway Entertainment. It was first screened at the Mumbai Film Festival in 2013. The film is distributed by PVR Director's Rare and was released in Mumbai, NCR-Delhi, Bangalore, Pune, Ahmedabad and Kolkata on 5 December 2014. TVF is the online partner for the movie.

== Plot ==
In this slacker bro-mantic comedy, writing partners Dulal and Mainak dream of shaking up the Bollywood film industry in India with their script Sulemani Keeda (Hindi street slang for "Pain in the Ass"). When they're being rejected by producers who refuse to read their script, they lurk around bookstores and poetry slams shamelessly hitting on girls. They find some hope when the drug-addled, cat-obsessed Gonzo Kapoor, the son of a famous B-movie producer, hires them to write an arthouse film billed as "Tarkovsky with orgies" for his directorial debut. All seems well until Dulal meets Ruma, a beautiful photographer who makes him question his choice to sell out.

== Cast ==
- Naveen Kasturia as Dulal
- Mayank Tewari as Mainak
- Aditi Vasudev as Ruma
- Karan Mirchandani as Gonzo
- Krishna Singh Bisht as Pokhriyal
- Rukshana Tabassum as Oona from Poona
- Dilip Prabhavalkar as Nene
- Razak Khan as Sweety Kapoor
- Rohini Ramanathan as Rohini
- Mahesh Bhatt as himself
- Amrita Rao as herself
- Anil Sharma as himself

== Soundtrack ==
Sulemani Keeda

Soundtrack album
- Released: 20 November 2014
- Genre: Feature film soundtrack
- Language: Hindi
- Label: Tulsea Pictures

The music is composed, arranged and produced by Arfaaz & Anurag.

No.	Title	Lyrics	Singer(s)/ Composer	Length
1.	"Desi Opera (Pa pa pa)"	Amit Masurkar	Namit Das & Pia Sukanya	1:19
2.	"How We're Hangin Out"	Arfaaz & Anurag	Arfaaz Kagalwala & Nisha Idicula	3:26
3.	"Sarangi Blues"		Composition and performance : Yuji Nakagawa	1:56
4.	"Fall of Dulal"		Accordion: Charles Srinivasan Guitar: Anurag Shanker	2:12
5.	"Sewri Capella"		Arfaaz Kagalwala	1:48
6.	"The Colaba Song"	Neeraj Rajawat	Namit Das, Arfaaz Kagalwala	2:56
7.	"Journey Through The Village"		Hammered Dulcimer: Max ZT	1:02
8.	"Juhu"		Trumpet: Agnelo Picardo Guitar, Piano: Anurag Shanker	1:35
9.	"Ice Cream"		Trumpet: Agnelo Picardo; Guitar, Bass, Piano: Anurag Shanker	2:07
10.	"Cocaine Surfin'"		Guitar: Anurag Shanker	0:43
11.	"Duurr"	Satyanshu and Devanshu Singh	Siddharth Basrur	4:12
12.	"Satellite"	Arfaaz Kagalwala	Arfaaz Kagalwala & Bass: Anurag Shanker	2:55

== Critical reception ==
The film has overall positive reviews. Farhan Akhtar mentions "Contemporary filmmaking at its best! Watch it!” The co-writer of Pulp Fiction, Roger Avary watched the film in Los Angeles and emailed, "[Sulemani Keeda] reminds me of my early years with Quentin Tarantino! A free-wheeling, manic comedy about how the folly of ambition can alter a friendship."

Deborah Young reviewing the film in The Hollywood Reporter writes, "The film's brash, open-hearted spirit is full of giggly jokes that get the audience on the boys' side. There's much to appreciate in the inventive mise-en-scene and creative editing."

Firstpost.com puts Sulemani Keeda in 2014's "Most Awaited Films" list alongside biggies like Anurag Kashyap's Bombay Velvet and Vishal Bharadwaj's Haider.

Sulemani Keeda has been featured in India Today's list of films to watch out for in 2014.

In an article featuring the film in The Indian Express, journalist Sankhayan Ghosh writes, "Sulemani Keeda is a universal story. It takes the narrative path of a slacker comedy, a popular film genre. It is light-hearted and funny with the director's assured touches, for instance, an animated set-piece that shows a pet cat snort cocaine and kill itself in a fish bowl."

In the words of critic Elvis D'Silva: "You have to be as exhausted by Bollywood romance as I am to appreciate exactly how surprising and wonderful that is… For me, the real star of the movie was the blossoming romantic relationship between Dulal and Ruma. Kudos to Mr. Masurkar for pulling off a depiction of youthful attraction without ever being loud or boisterous."

Arnesh Ghose writes, "While Tewari steals the show with his frolicking comic timing and dialogue delivery, Masurkar should be applauded for a crisp screenplay and dialogues… the all-pervading irreverence and we-don’t-give-a-fuck attitude makes it an intimate story of Mumbai's film-dreaming strugglers."

Mayank Shekhar writes about Sulemani Keeda "Slacker Comedy at its Best- An outsider's take, like Sulemani Keeda, requires only putting a camera before two strugglers and everything just becomes so naturally funny!"

Ahead of its 5 December theatrical release, the film was screened for Press Preview at PVR in Juhu, a western Mumbai suburb. Several celebrities, actors, writers and other associates turned up for the event packing a full house. Press preview burgeoned into 'Premier' with the crowd enthusiastically turning up and making it huge. Amrita Rao, Ranvir Shorey, Kanu Behl (of Titli fame) and Vikramaditya Motwane had all the praises for young writers slack comedy.

Arnab Banerjee of Firstpost rightly puts across "The film echoes sentiments and experiences of all screenplay writers worldwide, whether in Bollywood or Hollywood. That must be the reason for the young film’s instant connection with moviegoers in the festival circuit wherever it has been screened so far. This is their story, just padded with some caricature and prettiness."

Hindustan Times critic Rohit Vats justifies Sulemani Keeda in the title as "Ordinary people, Extraordinary show"

Rediff.com says, "The duo's (Naveen and Mayank) prowess as actors becomes obvious in a brilliant scene that depicts one of their writing sessions in black and white, without any words.Every other actor in the film has given it their 100% too – from Krishna Singh Bisht's manchild Pokhriyal, Karan Mirchandani's cocaine-snorting, cat-loving Gonzo and the lovely Aditi Vasudev as Ruma."

Rachit Gupta for Filmfare.com:says "A special mention to the CGI scene where Karan’s character snorts cocaine. This particular scene belongs in such memorable movies as Pineapple Express and This Is The End. This is beyond hilarious. It will give you a stomachache. A thousand likes to Masurkar for deviating from the norm and having the audacity to try something different."

"The film is peppered with cinematic references, deftly treated with equal parts devout worship and irreverent satire. It follows an episodic structure much like their script in the film that never sees the light of day, but whatever it lacks in action it makes up for in wordplay. Though some might say that Sulemani Keeda can be best described in one of its own closing lines, (“Dialogues acche thhe, film theek thi,”) I'll say it's definitely worth a watch for some zany comedy, break-out performances and a peppy soundtrack that you'll surprisingly find yourself humming on the way back home."Dipika Bhatia summarises for Business Standard.

Shubha Shetty Saha analyses the casting and editing as follows on Mid-day "Casting is good, editing (Khushboo Agarwal) is fantastic. Naveen and Mayank fit into their roles pretty well and do a commendable job. A special mention has to be made of Aditi who carried her role with remarkable ease and she is pretty easy on the eye, too. Hope this girl gets more roles to prove her mettle further."

Sonal Chopra for Sify.com writes "Director Amit V Masurkar's indie slacker comedy hits home for the most part as it gives [sic] us these deeply flawed, real characters that we laugh at and laugh with. We emotionally invest in their everyday tragedies and smile at their comical solutions. In that sense, the film is as rich, complex, and tragicomic as life itself. Go for it!"

Rajeev Masand wrote, " Slickly shot, capturing a real, lived-in feel of the city, this is a charming little indie that manages to say something important, while never forgetting to make you laugh. I'm going with three out of five for Sulemani Keeda. Give it a chance."
