= Yudh (TV series) =

Indian television miniseries

- Genre: Psychological thriller
- Developed by: Mrinalini Khanna
- Written by: Bijesh Jayarajan; Manu Warrier; Dialogues; Anukalp Goswami; Bijesh Jayarajan
- Screenplay by: Bijesh Jayarajan
- Story by: Bijesh Jayarajan
- Directed by: Ribhu Dasgupta; Dipti Kalwani
- Creative director: Anurag Kashyap
- Starring: See below
- Composer: Vinayak Netke
- Country of origin: India
- Original language: Hindi
- No. of episodes: 20

Production
- Executive producer: Miriam Joseph
- Producer: Ramesh Pulapaka
- Production location: India
- Cinematography: Tribhuvan Babu Sadineni; Nilip Deb
- Editor: Nishant Radhakrishnan
- Camera setup: Multi-camera
- Running time: Approx. 38-42 minutes
- Production companies: Endemol India; Saraswati Creations

Original release
- Network: Sony Entertainment Television
- Release: 14 July – 14 August 2014

Yudh (transl. War) is an Indian television psychological thriller miniseries directed by Ribhu Dasgupta and Dipti Kalwani. It stars Amitabh Bachchan, Sarika, Zakir Hussain, Mona Wasu, Nawazuddin Siddiqui and Kay Kay Menon. This show is Bachchan's debut fiction television show. Produced by Endemol India and Saraswati Creations, Yudh premiered on Sony TV on 14 July 2014.

== Plot ==
Yudhisthir Sikarwar (Amitabh Bachchan) is an elite businessman who owns a conglomerate company known as the Shanti Group which consists of Shanti Constructions and Shanti Mining in Ghaziabad, Uttar Pradesh. He wishes to venture into the mining industry but he is diagnosed with Huntington's disease, an incurable neuropsychological disorder, which leaves him with a few years to live.

== Cast ==
- Amitabh Bachchan as Yudhisthir Sikarwar
- Sarika as Gauri Shekhar
- Ayesha Raza Mishra as Nayantara Sikarwar
- Pavail Gulati as Rishikesh Sikarwar
- Aahana Kumra as Taruni Sikarwar
- Avinash Tiwary as Advocate Ajatshatru
- Mona Wasu as Mona Shekhar
- Zakir Hussain as Anand Upadhyay
- Tigmanshu Dhulia as Home Minister Bharat Choudhary
- Kay Kay Menon as Municipal Commissioner
- Nawazuddin Siddiqui as Sanjay Kumar Mishra
- Anurag Kashyap as Mr. Sikarwar
- Yusuf Hussain as Gautam Dev
- Shaiza Kashyap as taker
- Siddharth Chandra as Rahul Mehra
- Himesh Choudhary as Chhotu
- Inder Kumar as Raju

== Reception ==
DNA India praised the light use of background music, casting and the unobtrusive camera work, but stated that the production values were lacking for a project where each episode cost an estimated ₹ 3 crores, stating that the sets were "tacky" and the sound quality was poor.
