= Pavail Gulati =

Indian actor

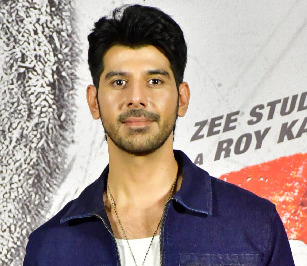
- Gulati in 2025
- Born: 14 September 1987 (age 39); New Delhi, India
- Occupation: Actor
- Years active: 2010–present

Pavail Gulati is an Indian actor who primarily works in Hindi films and series. He is best known for his roles in the films Thappad (2020) and Dobaaraa (2022), and the series Yudh (2014) and Faadu (2022).

== Early life ==
Gulati was born 14 September 1987 in Delhi. He went to the Bluebells School International while attending summer workshops at the National School Of Drama. He also learnt dance with Shiamak Davar.

At the age of 18, Gulati moved to Mumbai in 2006 with the aspiration of studying acting.

== Career ==
Pavail started his career as an assistant casting director in My Name Is Khan and made his acting debut with the film Hide & Seek in 2010. He then made his TV debut with Yudh in 2014 portraying Amitabh Bachchan's son. He then appeared in the short film Queen of Hearts in 2016.

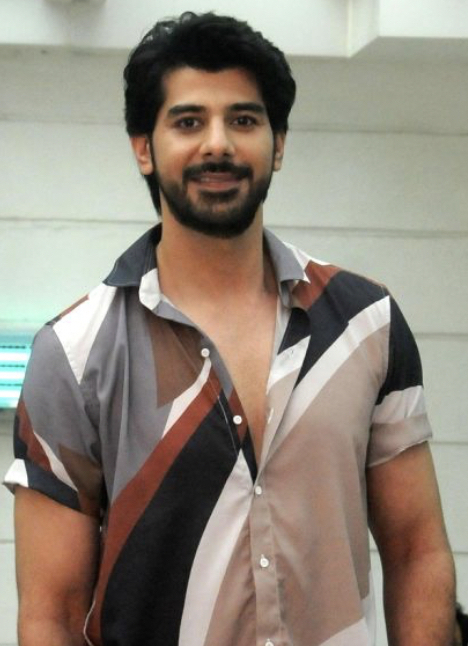
Gulati in 2022

In 2017, he made his web debut with Pyaar on the Rocks and also appeared in the film Ittefaq opposite Sonakshi Sinha. He then appeared in Imtiaz Ali's short film The Other Way opposite Shreya Chaudhary and in the web series Haq Se opposite Parul Gulati in 2018.

Gulati portrayed a journalist in Kalank and appeared in an episode of Made in Heaven, both in 2019. In 2020, he appeared in Anurag Kashyap's Segment in Ghost Stories and portrayed an Army Officer in the web series Avrodh: The Siege Within.

Gulati portrayed Taapsee Pannu's husband in the 2020 film Thappad. The film based on domestic violence, proved as a major turning point in his career. It received positive reviews from critics.

In 2022, he appeared in the short film Flow, in Dobaaraa as Anay opposite Pannu, in Goodbye alongside Rashmika Mandanna and Bachchan, and in web series Faadu opposite Saiyami Kher.

In 2023, he was seen in JioCinema's thriller I Love You alongside Rakul Preet Singh.

== In the media ==
Gulati ranked 19th in The Times Most Desirable Man List of 2020.

== Filmography ==
Key
†	Denotes films that have not yet been released

=== Films ===
Year	Title	Role	Notes	Ref.
2010	My Name Is Khan	—	Assistant casting director	
2010	Hide & Seek	Abhimanyu Jaiswal		
2016	Queen of Hearts	Mehta's son	Short film	
2017	Ittefaq	Chirag		
2018	The Other Way	Arjun	Short film	
2019	Kalank	Aditya Khanna		
2020	Ghost Stories	Ansh's father	Anurag Kashyap's segment	
2020	Thappad	Vikram Sabharwal		
2022	Flow	Kabir	Short film	
2022	Dobaaraa	Anay Anand		
2022	Goodbye	Karan Bhalla		
2023	I Love You	Rakesh "RO" Oberoi		
2025	Deva	ACP Rohan D'Silva		
2025	Kaushaljis vs Kaushal	Yug Kaushal		

=== Television ===
Year	Title	Role	Notes	Ref.
2014	Yudh	Rishikesh Sikarwar		
2017	Pyaar on the Rocks	Rahul		
2018	Haq Se	Tabish "Azi" Azad		
2019	Made in Heaven	Angad Roshan	Episode: "All That Glitters Is Gold"	
2020	Avrodh: The Siege Within	Major Rishabh Sood		
2022	Faadu	Abhay		
2026	Teen Kauwe †	TBA	Amazon Prime Video series	

=== Music videos ===
Year	Title	Singer(s)	Ref.
2021	"Naa Dooja Koi"	Jyotica Tangri, Arko Pravo Mukherjee	
2023	"Jee Bhar Ke Tum"	Shreya Ghoshal	
2026	Hathras		
