= TVF Pitchers =

2015 Indian web series

- Genre: Comedy drama
- Created by: Arunabh Kumar
- Developed by: Arunabh Kumar
- Written by: Biswapati Sarkar; Shubham Sharma; Prashant Kumar; Arunabh Kumar; Talha Siddiqui
- Story by: Arunabh Kumar
- Directed by: Amit Golani
- Starring: Naveen Kasturia; Arunabh Kumar; Jitendra Kumar; Abhay Mahajan; Maanvi Gagroo; Ronjini Chakraborty; Riddhi Dogra; Sikandar Kher
- Composer: Vaibhav Bundhoo
- Country of origin: India
- Original language: Hindi
- No. of seasons: 2
- No. of episodes: 10

Production
- Executive producer: Arun Kumar
- Producer: The Viral Fever Media Labs
- Cinematography: Vaibhav Bundhoo
- Editor: Prashant Machhar
- Running time: 30–57 minutes
- Production company: The Viral Fever Media Labs

Original release
- Network: TVFPlay YouTube (Season 1); ZEE5 (Season 2)
- Release: 10 June 2015 – present

TVF Pitchers is an Indian Hindi-language streaming television series created by The Viral Fever (TVF) and developed by Arunabh Kumar. It features Naveen Kasturia, Arunabh Kumar, Jitendra Kumar and Abhay Mahajan along with Maanvi Gagroo and Riddhi Dogra.

The first season, which went on to receive much acclaim, was written by Biswapati Sarkar and was directed by Amit Golani. The story follows four friends, Naveen, Jitu, Yogi and Mandal, who quit their jobs in order to develop their own start-up company. The season consisted of five episodes and premiered online on TVF's content portal TVFPlay on 10 June 2015. A week later, on 17 June, it premiered on YouTube. The season finale premiered on TVFPlay on 30 August 2015. The show was highly appreciated and has since developed a cult status.

For the second season, the series moved to ZEE5 as a part of its original programming. The series has been written by Arunabh Kumar, Prashant Kumar, Shubham Sharma and Talha Siddiqui. It has been directed by Vaibhav Bundhoo and Arunabh Kumar. The story is set years after the end of season 1 and traces the story of the same startup that was founded by the four friends. It premiered on 23 December 2022.

== Premise ==
Four friends — Naveen Bansal, Jitendra "Jitu" Maheshwari, Yogendra "Yogi" Kumar and Saurabh Mandal — enter the business world by launching their own start-up company. Naveen becomes angry for not getting a project from the company in which he works, gets drunk and resigns. He faces a dilemma when he is offered a position in a branch office located in Beijing. He leaves for the airport but upon reaching there he realizes that he is not destined for routine jobs. At the same time, he receives news of his "B-Plan" reaching the final of the NASSCOM start-up conclave. This sets off a chain of events in which the four again finds what they really want in life, and face challenges in getting their start-up idea off the ground.

== Cast ==
| Portrayed by | Character | Appearances | |
| Portrayed by | Character | Season 1 | Season 2 |
|---|---|---|---|
| Naveen Kasturia | Naveen Bansal, the one who has the start-up idea and was earlier working as executive regional manager at MOKART | Main | Main |
| Jitendra Kumar | Jitendra "Jitu" Maheshwari, who was working at Infocrat Technologies as a senior developer | Main | |
| Arunabh Kumar | Yogendra Kumar "Yogi" Pandey, who was probably operational in-charge at EliteCore technologies | Main | Main |
| Abhay Mahajan | Saurabh Mandal, who was a senior consultant marketing head at a company and also an MBA graduate | Main | Main |
| Maanvi Gagroo | Shreya, Naveen's girlfriend | Main | Guest |
| Riddhi Dogra | Prachi Meena, Pragati's (firm) investor and board member | | Main |
| Sikandar Kher | Prabhash Mehta, CEO and co-founder of Alpha 1, a competitor of Pragati | | Main |
| Aakanksha Thakur | Saumya Maheshwari, wife of Jitu | Recurring | |
| Abhishek Banerjee | Bhati | Recurring | Recurring |
| Pranav Bhasin | Dungeon_Master | Recurring | Recurring |
| Gopal Datt | Ravi Ram Rastogi ("RRR") | Recurring | Recurring |
| Jaimini Pathak | Rajat Khanna, the CEO of MOKART | Recurring | |
| Rajesh Sharma | Gary Bhujiawala (2 episodes) | Recurring | |
| Biswapati Sarkar | Puneet | Recurring | |
| Sameer Saxena | Ankit Bhardwaj | Recurring | |
| Ashish Vidyarthi | Kishen Charan Desai | | Guest |
| Ronjini Chakraborty | Aparajita "Appu" | | Recurring |
| Neena Kulkarni | Naveen's mother | | Guest |

== Production ==
After the release of the first trailer, the show's premise was compared to that of the American TV show Silicon Valley. However, when the pilot premiered, viewers realized this was not the case. Arunabh Kumar, founder and CEO of The Viral Fever, told The Huffington Post that if there's an American TV show that did inspire Pitchers – not in content but in spirit – it is the HBO drama Entourage about a young Hollywood star on the rise.

== Episodes ==
| Series | Episodes | Originally released | | |
| Series | Episodes | First released | Last released | Network |
|---|---|---|---|---|
| 1 | 5 | 10 June 2015 | 30 August 2015 | TVFPlay; YouTube |
| 2 | 5 | 23 December 2022 | | ZEE5 |

=== Season 1 (2015) ===
| No. overall | Episode | Title | Directed by | Written by | Date of Broadcast |
|---|---|---|---|---|---|
| 1 | 1 | "Tu Beer Hai" | Amit Golani | Biswapati Sarkar | 10 June 2015 |
Naveen is upset with his company for not letting him lead a project for which he'd worked really hard. His mentor Bhati asks him a very fundamental question: "What are you?" Naveen and his friends discover the answer to the question in different ways.
| 2 | 2 | "And Then There Were Four" | Amit Golani | Biswapati Sarkar | 1 July 2015 |
While the startup is the idea of the three friends – Naveen, Jitu and Yogi – Naveen's roommate and IIM graduate Saurabh Mandal wants to join, and needs to convince the trio that they need him.
| 3 | 3 | "The Jury Room" | Amit Golani | Biswapati Sarkar | 22 July 2015 |
With all four members on board, the guys look for investors and are overwhelmed by the plethora of start-ups. Also, Jitu needs to convince his father to allow him to join the start-up.
| 4 | 4 | "Bulb Jalega Boss" | Amit Golani | Biswapati Sarkar | 12 August 2015 |
Continuing from the previous episode, Naveen, Mandal and Yogi are determined to succeed at the event under any circumstances, while Jitu has his own agenda to take care of at home. The events unfold parallel to each other.
| 5 | 5 | "Where Magic Happens" | Amit Golani | Biswapati Sarkar | 30 August 2015 |
The gang is one step away from their seed fund, but one innocent mistake might take it all away. Naveen's love life is also tested.

=== Season 2 (2022) ===
| No. overall | Episode | Title | Directed by | Written by | Date of Broadcast |
|---|---|---|---|---|---|
| 6 | 1 | "The Valley" | Arunabh Kumar & Vaibhav Bundhoo | Arunabh Kumar, Prashant Kumar, Shubham Sharma and Talha Siddiqui | 23 December 2022 |
The pitchers are on the verge of a breakthrough as they await major funding. To close their next round, they must convince KC Enterprises, an offline player in the same sector, to partner with them. While initially they get no response from KC Enterprises, however after a viral Twitter thread, they finally get a meeting. Do they succeed?
| 7 | 2 | "The Pivot" | Arunabh Kumar & Vaibhav Bundhoo | Arunabh Kumar, Prashant Kumar, Shubham Sharma and Talha Siddiqui | 23 December 2022 |
After the deal's failure, Naveen decides a change of approach is needed, but Prachi is reluctant to accept as she finds it a desperate move. At last, she presents a new condition to support the change - find a new CTO in 3 days.
| 8 | 3 | "The Sprint" | Arunabh Kumar & Vaibhav Bundhoo | Arunabh Kumar, Prashant Kumar, Shubham Sharma and Talha Siddiqui | 23 December 2022 |
The company goes on a sprint to finish a product within 30 days. But their sprint seems to have gone wrong because just three days before the launch most of the employees decide to resign.
| 9 | 4 | "The North Star Metric" | Arunabh Kumar & Vaibhav Bundhoo | Arunabh Kumar, Prashant Kumar, Shubham Sharma and Talha Siddiqui | 23 December 2022 |
Post the product launch, the three pitchers chase their own North Star Metrics: valuation, money in the bank, and employee satisfaction. Where does this search lead them?
| 10 | 5 | "The Term Sheet" | Arunabh Kumar & Vaibhav Bundhoo | Arunabh Kumar, Prashant Kumar, Shubham Sharma and Talha Siddiqui | 23 December 2022 |
The Pitchers engage in a heated argument over the tax allegation issue. Pragati is on the verge of shutdown. Alpha1 owner gives a proposal to acquire Pragati. Pitchers accept the offer or not.

== Soundtrack ==
TVF Pitchers

Soundtrack album by Vaibhav Bundhoo
- Released: 5 September 2015
- Genre: Soundtrack
- Length: 39:09
- Label: The Viral Fever
- Producer: Vaibhav Bundhoo

Vaibhav Bundhoo chronology
| Permanent Roommates (Season 1) (2014) | TVF Pitchers (2015) | Permanent Roommates (Season 2) (2016) |

For the original soundtrack for TVF Pitchers, The Viral Fever roped in Vaibhav Bundhoo who was a part of the media's previous series Permanent Roommates, after the overwhelming reception of the series. It consists of 15 original compositions created, produced and mixed by Bundhoo and was released in a separate jukebox format on YouTube on 5 September 2015. However the music album for the original series was released on 2 February 2017, as it took more time for mastering the tracks for streaming platform.

All music is composed by Vaibhav Bundhoo.

Track listing
| No. | Title | Length |
|---|---|---|
| 1. | "The Relevant Sound" (Pitchers Theme) | 0:51 |
| 2. | "The Relevant Sound" | 4:05 |
| 3. | "How You Want To Leave" | 3:28 |
| 4. | "Historical Intersections" | 3:38 |
| 5. | "Bounce" | 3:11 |
| 6. | "I Cannot Wait" (End Title Credits) | 2:25 |
| 7. | "I Cannot Wait" (Sad Version) | 0:49 |
| 8. | "The Heist" | 1:14 |
| 9. | "Bulb Jalega Boss" | 3:07 |
| 10. | "Aage Peeche" (End Titles) | 3:32 |
| 11. | "Jitu Destroys" | 1:43 |
| 12. | "Mandal Speech" | 2:52 |
| 13. | "The Cheque" | 1:09 |
| 14. | "Mere Sapnon" | 4:06 |
| 15. | "One Step at a Time" | 2:59 |

== Release ==
Arunabh Kumar, who co-starred in TVF Pitchers and also the founder of TVF, announced that the series will be released in May 2015. The official teaser was released on 3 April 2015, confirming the said date. However, the 4-minute teaser trailer of the series, which released on 27 May 2015, announced a new release date of 10 June 2015.

The first episode of the series was released on The Viral Fever's official media streaming platform TVF Play, and a week later, on 17 June 2015, it was uploaded on YouTube. Each episode was released within a three-week window so as to upload simultaneously in TVF Play and YouTube. TVF Pitchers is the first ever web series to be released directly through TVF Play with its inception in early 2015. The last episode of the series was unveiled on TVF on 30 August 2015 and on YouTube a day later.

After The Viral Fever announced a new Tamil streaming platform titled TVF Machi, in order to cover the audience across the regional market, the makers released the dubbed Tamil version of the series on 6 October 2017. In late 2016, it was reported that the second season of the series was reported to be in the process, however was not confirmed officially.

In February 2021, TVF released a video to announce their lineup for 2021 on their YouTube channel. The video consists of clips from the upcoming TVF series as well as old clips from the existing series hinting at their further seasons. The climax of the video shows archive footage from the first season of TVF Pitchers teasing the possibility of a second season.

In June 2021, the OTT platform ZEE5 announced a content partnership with TVF to exclusively stream its upcoming shows including the second season of TVF Pitchers.

Season 2 was officially announced on 5 December 2022 and the trailer was released on 13 December 2022. The second season of the show premiered on 23 December 2022 on ZEE5.

== Reception ==
=== Season 1 ===
The first season of TVF Pitchers has been well received by the internet audience The first episode has more than 7.7 million views.

=== Season 2 ===
The second season received a largely positive response. "Pitchers 2 is a worthy sequel, thanks to its true-to-life characters and themes of start-up business challenges," noted the Times of India. The Hindustan Times wrote, "And when it comes to getting it right, Pitchers season 2 doesn’t shy away from serving bitter reality without a sweetener.".

== See also ==
- List of productions by The Viral Fever
