= Bose: Dead/Alive =

Indian historical drama web television miniseries about Subhas Chandra Bose

- Genre: Historical period drama
- Created by: Ekta Kapoor
- Based on: India's Biggest Cover-Up by Anuj Dhar
- Developed by: Ekalavya Bhattacharya; Jyoti Kapur Das
- Written by: Reshu Nath
- Directed by: Pulkit
- Creative directors: Ekalavya Bhattacharya; Nimisha Pandey; Jyoti Kapur Das
- Starring: Rajkummar Rao; Naveen Kasturia; Edward Sonnenblick; Anna Ador; Alexx O'Nell
- Narrated by: Naveen Kasturia
- Theme music composer: Neel Adhikari
- Opening theme: "Bose Title Track" by Neel Adhikari, MC Todfod & Qaushiq Mukherjee
- Ending theme: "Bose Title Track" by Neel Adhikari, MC Todfod & Qaushiq Mukherjee
- Composers: Neel Adhikari; Andrew T. Mackay
- Country of origin: India
- Original languages: Hindi; English
- No. of seasons: 1
- No. of episodes: 9

Production
- Executive producers: Hansal Mehta (creative producer); Suman Sengupta
- Producer: Indranil Chakraborty
- Production locations: Kolkata; Bolpur; Mumbai; Ladakh; Thailand; Poland
- Cinematography: Kumar Saurabh
- Editor: Yasha Ramchandani
- Running time: 20-29 minutes
- Production company: BIG Synergy Media

Original release
- Network: ALT Balaji
- Release: 20 November 2017

Bose: Dead/Alive is an Indian historical drama streaming television miniseries based on the 2012 book India's Biggest Cover-up by activist Anuj Dhar that was released on ALTBalaji on 20 November 2017. The show stars Rajkummar Rao portrays the titular protagonist, based on the life of Netaji Subhas Chandra Bose, with supporting roles including Naveen Kasturia as Darbari Lal, Edward Sonnenblick as Stanley Allen, and Anna Ador as Emilie Schenkl.

== Premise ==
On 18 August 1945, after his overloaded Japanese plane crashed in Japanese-occupied Formosa (now Taiwan), Netaji Subhas Chandra Bose (Rajkumar Rao) is presumed dead. However, his family in Kolkata receive a telegram from Mahatma Gandhi to not conduct his last rites. It then begins with speculation about his death and other characters who suggest how he has vanished in the past as well, with all of them suggesting his possible return.

== Cast ==
- Rajkummar Rao as Netaji Subhas Chandra Bose
- Naveen Kasturia as Darbari Lal
- Edward Sonnenblick as Stanley Allen, IG Calcutta Police
- Anna Ador as Emilie Schenkl
- Alexx O'Nell as David Anderson
- Chinmoy Das as Sarat Chandra Bose, elder brother of Subhas Chandra Bose
- Nondini Chatterjee as Bhibhavati Devi
- Abhijit Lahiri as Janakinath Bose, father of Subhas Chandra Bose
- Praveena Deshpandey as Prabhavati Devi, mother of Subhas Chandra Bose
- Manoj Mehra as Hemanta Kumar Sarkar
- Patralekha as Nandani
- Surendra Rajan as Mahatma Gandhi
- Sanjay Gurbaxani as Jawaharlal Nehru
- Mariusz Daszczynski as Adolf Hitler
- Akash Sinha as Habib ur Rahman
- Agnelo Chang as Nakamura
- Sanjay Nath as Dr. Mathur
- Sunil Kumar Palwal as Hayat Khan
- Victoria Ansell Gauvin as Lydia
- Andy von Eich as Prince of Wales
- Mir Sarwar as Rehmat Khan / Bhagat Ram Talwar

== Episodes ==
- Episode 1: Dead Or Alive
- Episode 2: Bane of the British Raj
- Episode 3: Catch me if you can
- Episode 4: The Japanese Connection
- Episode 5: The Gold Traile
- Episode 6: Hide And Seek
- Episode 7: Lost And Found
- Episode 8: Escape To Afghanistan
- Episode 9: The End Game

== Awards ==
Year	Award	Category	Recipient	Result
2018	iReel Awards	Best Drama Series	Bose: Dead/Alive	Nominated
2018	iReel Awards	Best Actor (Drama)	Rajkumar Rao	Nominated
2018	iReel Awards	Best Actress (Drama)	Patralekha	Nominated
2018	iReel Awards	Best Writing (Drama)	Reshu Nath & Anuj Dar	Nominated
