= Amit V. Masurkar =

Indian film director and screenwriter

Amit V Masurkar
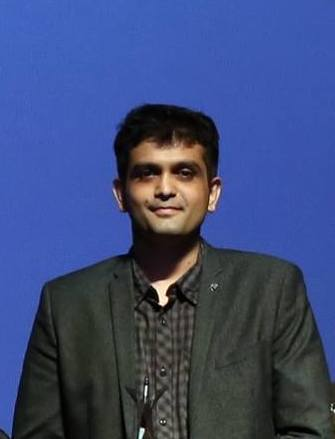
- Born: Amit V Masurkar
- Education: B.A. History
- Alma mater: Manipal Institute of Technology
- Occupations: Film Director; Screenwriter
- Notable work: Newton (film)

Amit V Masurkar is an Indian film director and screenwriter.

He directed the independent comedy film Sulemani Keeda. His second feature film, Newton was selected as the Indian entry for the Best Foreign Language Film at the 90th Academy Awards. He also won the Asia Pacific Screen Award for Best Screenplay for this film.

== Early life and education ==
Masurkar dropped out of an engineering course at Manipal Institute of Technology at the age of 20 to pursue filmmaking. He later acquired a BA degree in history from Mumbai University.

== Filmography ==
Films

Year	Title	Director	Screenplay	Story	Note
2011	Murder 3	No	Yes	No	additional screenplay
2013	Sulemani Keeda	Yes	Yes	Yes	
2017	Newton	Yes	Yes	Yes	
2021	Sherni	Yes	No	No	also Producer
