= Kaushaljis vs Kaushal =

Hindi-language family drama

- Official poster
- Directed by: Seemaa Desai
- Written by: Seemaa Desai
- Produced by: Jyoti Deshpande; Umesh Shukla; Ashish Wagh; Parag Desai
- Starring: Ashutosh Rana; Sheeba Chaddha; Pavail Gulati; Isha Talwar; Ashish Chaudhary
- Cinematography: Prasad Bhende
- Edited by: Mayur Hardas
- Music by: Saurabh Bhalerao
- Production companies: Jio Studios; Merry Go Round Studios; Mumbai Talkeez
- Distributed by: Disney+ Hotstar
- Release date: 21 February 2025
- Country: India
- Language: Hindi

Kaushaljis vs Kaushal is a 2025 Indian Hindi-language family drama film directed by Seemaa Desai. Produced by Jio Studios, the film premiered on the Disney+ Hotstar on 21 February 2025. It stars Ashutosh Rana, Sheeba Chaddha, Pavail Gulati, and Isha Talwar in lead roles, with Brijendra Kala and Grusha Kapoor and Ashish Chaudhary (which marks his 14 year comeback since Double Dhamaal) in supporting roles. The story centers on a middle-aged couple whose decision to separate following their son's suggestion leads to upheaval in the family.

== Plot ==
Sahil Kaushal is a small-town accountant who enjoys qawwali music, while his wife Sangita is a homemaker with a passion for perfume making. Their son, Yug, has settled in Delhi for his career. During an argument, Yug casually suggests his parents separate if they are unhappy. Unexpectedly, the Kaushals take the suggestion seriously and file for divorce, creating turmoil in the family and then Yug's boss Vicky Maurya.

As the news spreads, Yug’s relationship with his girlfriend Kiara, who values traditional family structures, begins to strain. Meanwhile, Sahil and Sangita explore their individual identities apart from each other. The narrative follows both couples as they navigate misunderstandings, rediscover themselves, and confront evolving views on love and commitment.

== Cast ==
- Ashutosh Rana as Sahil Kaushal
- Sheeba Chaddha as Sangita Kaushal
- Pavail Gulati as Yug Kaushal
- Isha Talwar as Kiara Meena Bansal
- Deeksha Joshi as Reet Kaushal, Yug's sister
- Brijendra Kala as Aseem
- Grusha Kapoor as Sheila
- Ashish Chaudhary as Vicky Maurya, Yug's boss
- Neha Panda as Yug's colleague

== Production ==
Directed by Seemaa Desai, the film was produced by Jyoti Deshpande, Umesh Shukla, Ashish Wagh, and Parag Desai under Jio Studios, Merry Go Round Studios, and Mumbai Talkeez. The film was shot in Kannauj and Noida, with the script incorporating elements of local culture such as traditional perfume-making and qawwali music.

== Reception ==
Kaushaljis vs Kaushal received positive reviews. Firstpost called it "a beautifully crafted, deeply moving film." India Today rated the film 3.5 out of 5, praising the performances and the director’s approach. The Times of India gave it 3 out of 5 stars, calling it an "earnest and heartwarming" portrayal of a family facing emotional changes. Rishabh Suri of Hindustan Times wrote "Ashutosh Rana and Sheeba Chadha steal the show in this light, breezy watch about an older couple divorcing."
