= Naveen Kasturia =

Indian actor (born 1985)

- Born: 26 January 1984 (age 42); Otukpo, Benue State, Nigeria
- Education: Netaji Subhas Institute of Technology
- Occupation: Actor
- Years active: 2009–present
- Spouse: Shubhanjali Sharma (m. 2024)

Naveen Kasturia (born 26 January 1985) is an Indian actor who primarily works in Hindi films and web series. Kasturia is best known for his portrayal in the web series TVF Pitchers, Bose: Dead/Alive, Happily Ever After, Aspirants and Breathe: Into the Shadows. He has appeared in films such as Sulemani Keeda (2014) and Waah Zindagi (2019).

== Early life ==
Kasturia was born in Otukpo, Nigeria in a Hindu family. His family moved back to India when he was a year old. He was brought up in a joint family in Delhi. He did his schooling from Birla Vidya Niketan and engineering in Manufacturing Process & Automation from Netaji Subhas Institute of Technology (now NSUT) in Delhi.

== Career ==
=== Debut and early recognition (2009–2020) ===
Naveen Kasturia started his career as an assistant director and made his acting debut in 2012 with Shanghai. In 2013, he made his web debut with Chai Sutta Chronicles. Kasturia then appeared in two films in 2014: Tigers and Sulemani Keeda. In Sulemani Keeda, he played a writer. The film met with positive reviews and Paloma Sharma of Rediff.com stated, "The duo's prowess as actors becomes obvious in a brilliant scene that depicts one of their writing sessions in black and white, without any words." Rajeev Masand was appreciative of him for being "natural on screen", while Rachit Gupta stated, "Naveen’s performance with the subliminal nervous energy and the totally gullible personality is good."

Kasturia's had his career breakthrough in 2015 with TVF Pitchers, where he played a budding start-up owner opposite Maanvi Gagroo. The first season was a success and earned him recognition. The series had its second season premiere in 2022. Ruchi Kaushal took note of his "believable performance" in the series.

=== Success and acclaim in streaming projects (2021–present) ===
Kasturia is widely recognised for his portrayal of an UPSC aspirant and later an IAS officer in the series Aspirants opposite Namita Dubey. The first season was released in 2021 and the second season in 2023. Sukanya Verma noted, "Kasturia does well to overcome his character's inherent cynicism with his desire to do good." Archita Kashyap of Firstpost stated, "Kasturia has succeeded in making Abhilash a convincing IAS officer. He plays the character with subtle body language touches like a suppressed smile and a touch of repressed arrogance." The series success further established his career. In 2021, he also appeared in the series Aapkey Kamrey Mein Koi Rahta Hai, Pati Patni Aur Panga opposite Adah Sharma, Runaway Lugai opposite Ruhi Singh and Kota Factory 2.

In 2022, Kasturia first appeared in the short film Tasalli Se. He then played an asylum's former patient in the second season of Breathe: Into the Shadows. Abhimanyu Mathur noted, "Kasturia leaves a mark though. As the unpredictable Victor, he is the show’s lost energy and one of the few highlights." In 2023, he first appeared in SK Sir Ki Class and then played a teacher in Sapne Vs Everyone. In 2024, he played a small-time writer in the second season of Mithya. Yatamanyu Narain of News 18 stated, "Kasturia’s portrayal of Amit as a disillusioned underdog brings a realism that grounds the role."

== Personal life ==
Kasturia married his longtime girlfriend Shubhanjali Sharma on 3 December 2024, in a traditional Hindu wedding ceremony in Udaipur.

== Filmography ==
Key
†	Denotes films / dramas that are not yet released

=== Films ===
Year	Title	Role	Notes	Ref.
2009	Jashnn	—N/a	Assistant director	
2010	Love Sex Aur Dhokha	—N/a	Assistant director	
2012	Shanghai	Ranjan	Assistant director	
2014	Tigers	—N/a	Assistant director	
2014	Sulemani Keeda	Dulal		
2016	Loveshhuda	Kunal		
2018	Hope Aur Hum	Nitin		
2018	Turtle	—N/a		
2019	Waah Zindagi	Ashok		
2022	Tasalli Se	Ranjan	Short film	

=== Web series ===
Year	Title	Role	Notes	Ref.
2013	Chai Sutta Chronicles	Siddharth		
2015–present	TVF Pitchers	Naveen Bansal		
2015	Man's World	Bus passenger	Special appearance	
2017	Social Series	Prithvi		
2017	Bose: Dead/Alive	Darbari Lal		
2018	The Good Vibes	Lakshya Tripathi		
2019	Fuh se Fantasy	Sushil	Episode: "Nyotaimori"	
2019	Thinkistan	Amit		
2019	Happily Ever After	Roneet Bagchi		
2019	Parchhayee	Jimmy		
2021	Aapkey Kamrey Mein Koi Rahta Hai	Subbu		
2021	Pati Patni Aur Panga	Romanchak Arora		
2021–present	TVF Aspirants	Abhilash Sharma IAS		
2021	Runaway Lugai	Rajnikant Sinha		
2021–present	Kota Factory	Dhruv		
2022	Breathe: Into the Shadows	Victor Bahl	Season 2	
2023	SK Sir Ki Class	Abhilash Sharma IAS	Special appearance	
2023	Sapne Vs Everyone	Sumit		
2024	Mithya: The Darker Chapter	Amit Chaudhary	Season 2	
2025	Guri-Dhairya Ki Love Story	Abhilash Sharma IAS	Special appearance	
2025	Salakaar	Adhir Dayal	Season 1	
2026	Adarsh Baal Vidyalaya	Mukul Degla	Season 1	

== Awards and nominations ==
Year	Award	Category	Work	Result	Ref.
2021	Filmfare OTT Awards	Best Actor – Comedy Series	Runaway Lugaai	Nominated	
