= Blurr =

2022 Indian horror thriller film by Ajay Bahl

- Official release poster
- Directed by: Ajay Bahl
- Written by: Ajay Bahl; Pawan Soni
- Based on: Julia's Eyes by Guillem Morales and Oriol Paulo
- Produced by: Vishal Rana; Taapsee Pannu; Pranjal Khandhdiya; Tony D'souza; Pradeep Sharma; Manav Durga
- Starring: Taapsee Pannu; Gulshan Devaiah
- Cinematography: Sudhir K. Chaudhary
- Edited by: Manish Pradhan
- Music by: Aditya Pushkama; Rishi Dutta; Shivangi Bhayana
- Production companies: Zee Studios; Outsiders Films; Echelon Productions
- Distributed by: ZEE5
- Release date: 9 December 2022
- Running time: 126 minutes
- Country: India
- Language: Hindi

Blurr is a 2022 Indian Hindi-language horror thriller film. It has been directed by Ajay Bahl and jointly produced by Zee Studios, Outsiders Films and Echelon Productions. The film features Taapsee Pannu, Abhilash Thapliyal, and Gulshan Devaiah in the leading roles. This is Taapsee Pannu's first project as a producer.

The film premiered on 9 December 2022 on ZEE5.

== Cast ==
- Taapsee Pannu as Gayatri/Gautami
- Gulshan Devaiah as Neel
- Kruttika Desai Khan as Mrs. Radha Solanki
- Abhilash Thapliyal as Chander Solanki
- Sorabh Chauhan as Bipin Nath
- Nitya Mathur as Ira
- Sumit Nijhawan as Mahendra Chandel

== Plot ==
The film is the official Hindi remake of Spanish film Julia's Eyes, written by Guillem Morales and Oriol Paulo.

The story is about one woman, Gayatri, finding about the untimely death of her twin sister, who was visually impaired. She then tries to uncover the mystery behind the death while struggling with her own eyesight..

Gayatri's twin sister gautami is murdered. The former sets out to identify the killer, but becomes blind in the process. Gayatri is stressed after knowing the death of gautami and tells her husband Gulshan that gautami was waiting for surgery for her eye disease so this suicide cannot happen but gulshan suspect this all gayatri's tension exaggerating character . Gayatri identifies her blindness disease also getting uncovered with each stressful emotional condition and goes to a doctor who tells need eye rest and surgery to eyes . Gayatri comes to know of a stranger visited gautami frequently and starts in search of the stranger, each person who knows the stranger gets killed and the CCTV disc gets stolen as she visits the CCTV room and finally Gulshan also gets killed as found hanging one day. Later gayatri gets hospitalised when she drives and gets blind . In the hospital one male stranger takes care of her and helps her. Gayatri gets invited to his home and gayatri discovers the killer in him as he confess that he killed her for his love rejection and now tries to kill gayatri who is blinded but manages to knock him down and call the police , as police comes the stranger cuts his throat and kills himself. Later gayatri seen at hospital recover her eye health after the doctor opens the eye bandage. The eye donor was her husband Gulshan. Gayatri weeps at Gulshan body in mortuary telling she didn recognize his love for her when he was alive.

== Production ==
The principal photography of the film began in July 2021. The film was wrapped up on 31 August 2021.

Since the protagonist of the film is visually impaired, Taapsee Pannu shot part of the film blindfolded to get the character right.

== Promotions ==
The teaser of the movie was released on 20 November 2022. As a part of the promotion, the movie was screened for a visually impaired audience.

== Soundtrack ==
Blurr

Soundtrack album by Aditya Pushkarna, Rishi Dutta and Shivangi Bhayana
- Released: 12 December 2022
- Recorded: 2021–2022
- Genre: Feature film soundtrack
- Length: 6:06
- Language: Hindi
- Label: Zee Music Company
External audio
- Audio Jukebox on YouTube

The music of the film is composed by Aditya Pushkarna, Rishi Dutta and Shivangi Bhayana while the lyrics are written by Srushti Tawade and Akshay The One.

Track listing
No.	Title	Lyrics	Music	Singer(s)	Length
1.	"Nishaana"	Srushti Tawade	Aditya Pushkarna	Srushti Tawade	2:24
2.	"Blurr Title Track" (Male Version)	Akshay The One	Rishi Dutta, Shivangi Bhayana	Mellow D, Shivangi Bhayana	1:51
3.	"Blurr Title Track" (Female Version)	Akshay The One	Rishi Dutta, Shivangi Bhayana	Dee MC, Shivangi Bhayana	1:51
Total length:					6:06

== Critical reception ==
On the review aggregator website Rotten Tomatoes, 80% of 5 critics' reviews are positive, with an average rating of 5.5/10.

Anna M. M. Vetticad of Firstpost rated the film one out of five stars, and upset with the atmospherics, camera work and Taapsee Pannu's performance. She wrote, "The larger message Blurr is aiming at gives it an interesting additional layer, even though it is not fully realised". Roktim Rajpal for India Today wrote "Taapsee puts her worst foot forward and excels in a few inherently intense scenes. That said, one gets the feeling that she does not get enough scope to internalise the characters". Tanul Thakur of The Wire wrote, "But Blurr resists the easy temptations, finding wrong ways to divulge personality, solidify tension, spring surprise". It also earned negative review from Saibal Chatterjee who wrote,"The film loses sight of its primary purpose - delivering a thriller that makes the most of its resources while staying within its chosen parameters".

== Remake ==
The film was remade in South Korea as The Eyes (2026). Also Tamil remake Unparvayil also has the same story
