= Aspirants =

2021 Indian web series by TVF

- Poster of third season of Aspirants
- Also known as: TVF Aspirants
- Genre: Coming-of-age; Drama
- Created by: Arunabh Kumar; Shreyansh Pandey; Deepesh Sumitra Jagdish
- Developed by: Arunabh Kumar
- Story by: Deepesh Sumitra Jagdish; Ashutosh Pankaj
- Directed by: Apoorv Singh Karki (Season 1 & 2); Deepesh Sumitra Jagdish (Season 3)
- Starring: Naveen Kasturia; Shivankit Singh Parihar; Abhilash Thapliyal; Sunny Hinduja; Namita Dubey
- Music by: Rohit Sharma; Tusshar Mallek; Nilotpal Bora; Sangeet Haldipur; Siddharth Haldipur
- Country of origin: India
- Original language: Hindi
- No. of seasons: 3
- No. of episodes: 15

Production
- Executive producers: Arun Kumar; Shreyansh Pandey; Vijay Koshy
- Producer: Arunabh Kumar
- Cinematography: Georgy John; Arjun Kukreti; Sreechith Vijayan Damodar
- Editor: Tushar Manocha
- Running time: 37–60 minutes
- Production company: The Viral Fever Media Labs

Original release
- Network: TVF Play; YouTube; Amazon Prime Video
- Release: 7 April 2021 – present

Aspirants is an Indian Hindi-language coming-of-age drama web series produced by The Viral Fever (TVF) and created by Arunabh Kumar and Shreyansh Pandey, written by Deepesh Sumitra Jagdish and directed by Apoorv Singh Karki. It stars Naveen Kasturia, Shivankit Parihar, Abhilash Thapliyal, Namita Dubey and Sunny Hinduja. The story follows three friends, Abhilash, Guri and SK who are preparing for the UPSC exam at Rajinder Nagar, Delhi.

The series began streaming on 7 April 2021, with five episodes have been premiered online on TVF's YouTube Channel and TVF Play. The season finale aired on 8 May 2021.

In October 2023, TVF announced the second season of the series, which premiered on Amazon Prime Video on 25 October 2023.

The third season of the series is scheduled to premiere on 13 March 2026 on Amazon Prime Video.

== Premise ==
TVF Aspirants is about the past and present of three friends, Abhilash, Guri and SK, who are UPSC aspirants. The past explains their UPSC aspirant life in Old Rajinder Nagar, Delhi and their struggle to crack the examination, while the present examines their lives outside Rajinder Nagar as adults.

The series is set in Old Rajinder Nagar, a locality in Delhi that is home to several coaching centers and hostels for UPSC aspirants. The story revolves around Abhilash, Guri, and SK, three friends who are preparing for the UPSC exam. The series portrays the ups and downs of their lives, their personal and professional struggles, and their relationships with each other and with their families.

== Cast ==
=== Main ===
| Portrayed by | Character | Season 1 (2021) | Season 2 (2023) | Season 3 (2026) |
|---|---|---|---|---|
| Naveen Kasturia | Abhilash Sharma IAS, District Magistrate of Rampur | Main | Main | Main |
| Shivankit Singh Parihar | Gurpreet "Guri" Singh | Main | Main | Main |
| Abhilash Thapliyal | Shwetketu "SK" Jha | Main | Main | Main |
| Sunny Hinduja | Sandeep Ohlan "Sandeep Bhaiya" | Main | Main | Main |
| Namita Dubey | Dhairya Singh | Main | Main | Main |
| Tengam Celine | Deepa Nabam, IPS officer | | Recurring | Main |
| Jatin Goswami | Pawan Kumar, DM of Sambhal | | | Main |

=== Recurring ===
- Kuljeet Singh as Walia Uncle, Abhilash's landlord in Rajinder Nagar
- Bijou Thaangjam as Pema Rijiju, SK's friend and a rapper
- Neetu Jhanjhi as Walia Aunty, Abhilash's landlord in Rajinder Nagar
- Nupur Nagpal as Pragati, Guri's ex-girlfriend; a PSC officer
- Abhishekh Sonpaliya as Abhilash's PA
- Darius Chinoy as Abhilash's former boss
- Preeti Agarwal Mehta as Anuradha Tiwari IAS
- Sandeep Sharma as Manohar Prakash, Abhilash's former UPSC coach in Rajinder Nagar
- Jaspal Sharma as S. Chandrakant, Head of Accounting at Abhilash's former UPSC coaching center in Rajinder Nagar
- Salim Siddiqui as Xen Officer

== Episodes ==
=== Series overview ===
| Series | Episodes | Originally released | | |
| Series | Episodes | First released | Last released | Network |
|---|---|---|---|---|
| 1 | 5 | 7 April 2021 | 8 May 2021 | TVF Play; YouTube |
| 2 | 5 | 25 October 2023 | | Amazon Prime Video |
| 3 | 5 | 13 March 2026 | | Amazon Prime Video |

=== Season 1 ===
| Episode | Title | Directed by | Written by | Date of Broadcast |
|---|---|---|---|---|
| 1 | "UPSC - Optional Me Kya Hai?" | Apoorv Singh Karki | Deepesh Sumitra Jagdish | 7 April 2021 |
Abhilash entered the Old Rajinder Nagar, Delhi, to prepare for his UPSC CSE, which is famous for Coaching institutes of Civil service examinations. He is trying to change his optional subject but the things become difficult as it is his last attempt.
| 2 | "Teacher Sahi Hona Chahiye" | Apoorv Singh Karki | Deepesh Sumitra Jagdish | 14 April 2021 |
Abhilash became dissatisfied with his teacher in the institute eventually decided to leave his coaching institute as he is worried about his examination.
| 3 | "Positive Approach Rakh Yaar" | Apoorv Singh Karki | Deepesh Sumitra Jagdish | 21 April 2021 |
After being taunted regarding his negative approach, Abhilash went to study at the library, where Dhairya enters his life after which things turn positive.
| 4 | "Plan B Kya Hai?" | Apoorv Singh Karki | Deepesh Sumitra Jagdish | 28 April 2021 |
Finally, Abhilash realises that cracking UPSC is difficult, no matter how determined a candidate is. He also realises that he needs a backup plan.
| 5 | "UPSC - Pre...Mains aur Life." | Apoorv Singh Karki | Deepesh Sumitra Jagdish | 8 May 2021 |
IAS Abhilash Sharma struggles when the past meets the present. Things took turn when Sandeep Bhaiya, his mentor cum friend from the past, returns as a colleague and advise him as he used to do

=== Season 2 ===
| Episode | Title | Directed by | Written by | Date of Broadcast |
|---|---|---|---|---|
| 1 | "Self Study" | Apoorv Singh Karki | Deepesh Sumitra Jagdish, Ashutosh Chaturvedi, Pankaj Mavchi | 25 October 2023 |
Abhilash shares his ambitious vision for Rampur, but businessman Dayanidhi Joshi challenges his administration, while SK and Guri are surprised by Abhilash's unexpected return to ORN in the past
| 2 | "Strategy" | Apoorv Singh Karki | Deepesh Sumitra Jagdish, Ashutosh Chaturvedi, Pankaj Mavchi | 25 October 2023 |
Sandeep Bhaiya's measures against a factory owner present the first roadblock in DM Abhilash's vision. Guri and SK debate whether or not to ask any favour from Abhilash for a crucial project.
| 3 | "Murphy's Law" | Apoorv Singh Karki | Deepesh Sumitra Jagdish, Ashutosh Chaturvedi, Pankaj Mavchi | 25 October 2023 |
Abhilash confronts the striking employees, to which Sandeep registers his objection. Meanwhile, young Abhilash goes through the challenges of the MAINS exam and a painful fight with his old friend SK.
| 4 | "Mock Interview" | Apoorv Singh Karki | Deepesh Sumitra Jagdish, Ashutosh Chaturvedi, Pankaj Mavchi | 25 October 2023 |
DM Abhilash's action against Sandeep threatens to derail their friendship with SK siding with Sandeep. Guri wins back the tender after an anonymous letter disqualifies the previous bidder.
| 5 | "Final Interview" | Apoorv Singh Karki | Deepesh Sumitra Jagdish, Ashutosh Chaturvedi, Pankaj Mavchi | 25 October 2023 |
Dhairya confronts Abhilash and convinces him to bury the past ghosts and move on in life while Sandeep casts allegations regarding Guri's tender which could bring down DM Abhilash.

=== Season 3 ===
| Episode | Title | Directed by | Written by | Date of Broadcast |
|---|---|---|---|---|
| 1 | "Waapsi" | Deepesh Sumitra Jagdish | Deepesh Sumitra Jagdish, Anurag Goswami, Anurag Ramesh Shukla | 13 March 2026 |
Abhilash, who once planned to become an IRS officer, is questioned by his mentor Radha Rajesh about his career choice. In the present, he faces an inquiry after allegations made by ALC Sandeep Ohlan. At the same time, he struggles to fix his friendship with SK but fails, leaving him upset. Later, Dhairya reveals something that makes the investigation even more troubling for Abhilash.
| 2 | "Santulan" | Deepesh Sumitra Jagdish | Deepesh Sumitra Jagdish, Anurag Goswami, Anurag Ramesh Shukla | 13 March 2026 |
While preparing for his final IAS attempt in Mukherjee Nagar, Abhilash realizes that his preparation lacks emotional stability. In the present, he faces a difficult situation when his former rival Pawan, now the DM of Sambhal, competes with him for the Education Town project. Meanwhile, both Abhilash's and Deepa's parents pressure them to proceed with their marriage without further delay.
| 3 | "Manovaigyanik Baadhayein" | Deepesh Sumitra Jagdish | Deepesh Sumitra Jagdish, Anurag Goswami, Anurag Ramesh Shukla | 13 March 2026 |
In Mukherjee Nagar, both Abhilash and Pawan help Hindi-medium aspirants with English, syllabus planning, and exam strategy, which further intensifies their rivalry. In the present, Abhilash faces difficulties in acquiring land for the Education Town project, allowing Pawan to move ahead in the competition for the project.
| 4 | "The Cut Off" | Deepesh Sumitra Jagdish | Deepesh Sumitra Jagdish, Anurag Goswami, Anurag Ramesh Shukla | 13 March 2026 |
In Mukherjee Nagar, aspirants discuss the expected cutoff for the prelims examination. Meanwhile, IPS officer Deepa Nabam is hospitalized after a police encounter, and Abhilash, with support from SK, Guri, and Dhairya, looks after her while dealing with official responsibilities. At the same time, ALC Sandeep Ohlan attempts to make a deal with Abhilash to secure the Education Town project for Pawan.
| 5 | "De Mauka Zindagi" | Deepesh Sumitra Jagdish | Deepesh Sumitra Jagdish, Anurag Goswami, Anurag Ramesh Shukla | 13 March 2026 |
During their UPSC days, the rivalry between Abhilash and Pawan reaches its peak on the final day of the mains examination. In the present, Abhilash refuses to withdraw from the Education Town project in Rampur, leading Pawan to openly question the system. Abhilash then takes a strong decision regarding the matter.

== Soundtrack ==
Aspirants: Season 1 (Music From the TVF Original Series)

Soundtrack album by Rohit Sharma, Tushar Mallek, Nilotpal Bora
- Released: 7 May 2021
- Genre: Soundtrack
- Length: 27:09
- Language: Hindi
- Label: Contagious Online Media Network Pvt Ltd
- Producer: Tushar Mallek

The series' soundtrack features 11 songs composed by Rohit Sharma, Tushar Mallek, and Nilotpal Bora and written by Deepesh Sumitra Jagdish, Avinash Chouhan, and Hussain Haidry. The track "Dhaaga" which is originally from TVF's previous series Yeh Meri Family (2018) was reused in the series.

| No. | Title | Lyrics | Music | Singer(s) | Length |
|---|---|---|---|---|---|
| 1. | "Aspirants Theme" | — | Tushar Mallek | Instrumental | 1:40 |
| 2. | "De Mauka Zindagi" | Avinash Chouhan | Nilotpal Bora | Nilotpal Bora | 2:47 |
| 3. | "Beparwaah" | Deepesh Sumitra Jagdish | Rohit Sharma | Arnab Dutta | 2:11 |
| 4. | "Mohbhang" | Deepesh Sumitra Jagdish | Rohit Sharma | Parul Mishra | 1:46 |
| 5. | "Dhaaga" | Hussain Haidry | Nilotpal Bora | Nilotpal Bora | 3:52 |
| 6. | "Bairagi" | Deepesh Sumitra Jagdish | Rohit Sharma | Rohit Sharma | 3:00 |
| 7. | "Phod De Ya Chhod De" | Deepesh Sumitra Jagdish | Rohit Sharma | Noxious D | 2:25 |
| 8. | "Guiding Light" | — | Tushar Mallek | Instrumental | 2:32 |
| 9. | "Positive Shift" | — | Tushar Mallek | Instrumental | 1:58 |
| 10. | "Triumph" | — | Tushar Mallek | Instrumental | 2:05 |
| 11. | "Aspirants Theme (Extended)" | — | Tushar Mallek | Instrumental | 2:53 |
| Total length: | | | | | 27:09 |

== Spin-offs ==
=== SK Sir Ki Class ===
- The first spin-off named SK Sir Ki Class was released on 21 February 2023. It focuses on SK, his life as UPSC teacher in Old Rajinder Nagar and his struggles to make one of his students Ashish Arora (Gagan Arora) prepare for the UPSC exams, even though Ashish doesn't want to.

=== Sandeep Bhaiya ===
- The second spin-off Sandeep Bhaiya was premiered on Youtube on 30 June 2023. It follows the early life struggles and passion of Sandeep Singh Ohlan (Sandeep Bhaiya) and his life after becoming a PCS officer.

=== Guri-Dhairya Ki Love Story ===
- The third spin-off Guri Dhairya Ki Love Story, written by Abhinandan Sridhar, Gunjan Saxena and Sonal Sheopori, was released on YouTube with the first episode aired on 25 March 2025. The series focuses on the period after quitting preparation for UPSC, Guri returns to his hometown to join his father's dairy firm and by chance, he meets Dhairya in his town, and later how they develop a love relationship between them.

== See also ==
- List of productions by The Viral Fever
