= Blouse (film) =

Indian short film

- Directed by: Vijayeta Kumar
- Written by: Sanjay Chandwara
- Produced by: Times Music
- Starring: Sumeet Vyas
- Cinematography: Arjun Sorte
- Edited by: Pranav Mistry
- Release date: 7 May 2014
- Country: India
- Language: Hindi

Blouse is an Indian Hindi short film based on an submissive school teacher, Shyam, and directed by Vijayeta Kumar. Shyam wants to give a special gift to his wife, Roopa, on the occasion of Karwa Chauth, but he loses her blouse measurements.

In this film, Shyam's role is played by Sumeet Vyas, Roopa is played by Preeti Hansraj Sharma, Kanta is played by Ronjini Chakraborty, and Babu Tailor is played by Imran Rasheed. In the New York Indian Film Festival, it won the Best Short Film Award. It also won Best Script at the Jaipur International Film Festival.

== Cast ==
- Sumeet Vyas as Shyam
- Preeti Hansraj Sharma as Roopa
- Ronjini Chakraborty as Kanta
- Imran Rasheed as Babu Tailor
