= Abhilash Thapliyal =

Indian actor and radio host

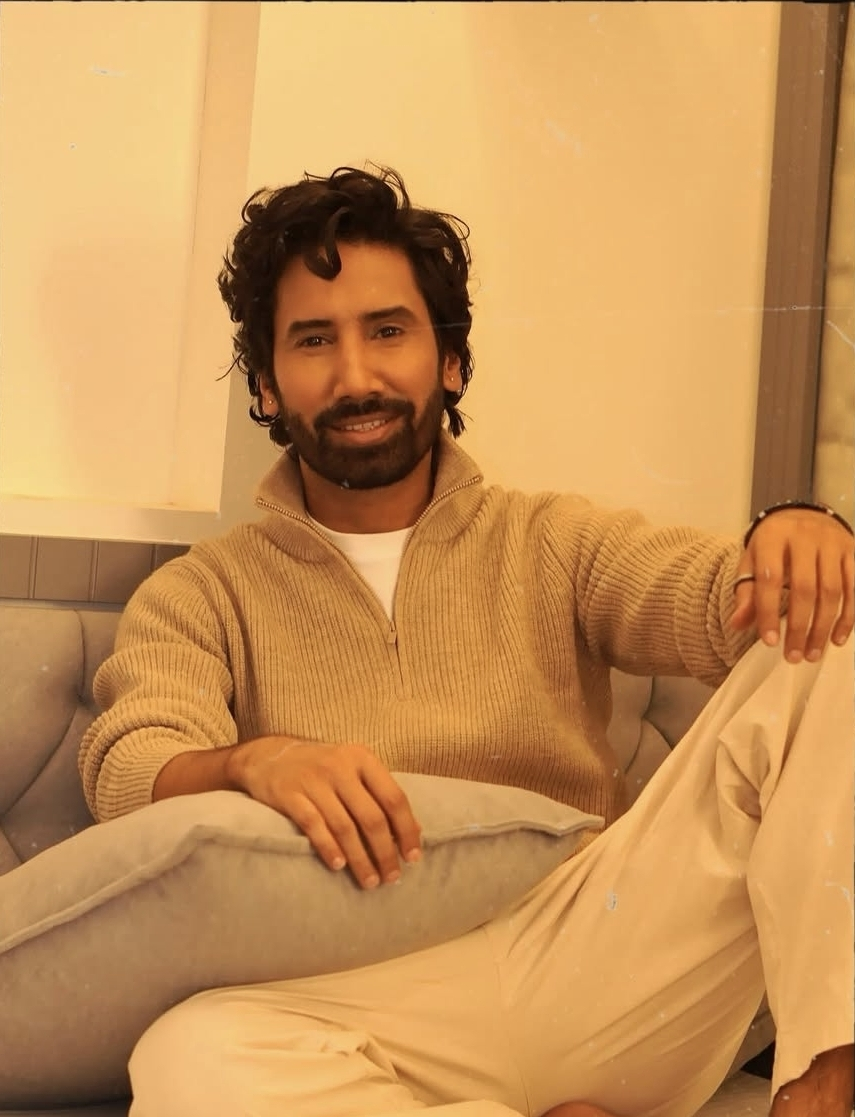
- Born: Abhilash Thapliyal; 24 November 1987 (age 38); India
- Occupations: Actor, radio jockey, television host
- Years active: 2006–present
- Spouse: Anubhooti Panda

Abhilash Thapliyal (born 24 November) is an Indian film actor, radio jockey and TV host. He is known for his prominent roles in 'Aspirants (2021)' as Shwetketu (SK), 'Kennedy (2023)' as Chandan, 'TVF Inmates (2017)' as Sukesh, 'Faadu - A Love Story (2022)' as Roxy and 'Raksha Bandhan (2022)' as Swapnil. He has been associated with a few Indian and global radio stations, as well as a few television channels as a voice actor. After being a part of Red FM, Abhilash took a break as a Radio Jockey, and appeared in Aleya Sen Sharma's directorial debut film, Dil Juunglee, alongside Taapsee Pannu and Saqib Saleem.

The film Kennedy, directed by Anurag Kashyap, premiered at the Cannes Film Festival in 2023.

== Early life and education ==
Thapliyal belongs to Pauri Garhwal in Uttarakhand.

His father served as an officer in the Indian Army while his mother is a homemaker.

He completed his schooling at Army Public School and Kendriya Vidyalaya and later graduated in journalism and mass communication from the University of Delhi.

== Career ==
=== Radio career ===
Thapliyal began his career in radio while studying at Delhi University.

He worked with radio stations including Radio Tarang, Radio One, Fever 104 FM and Red FM 93.5.

Between 2010 and 2015 he hosted the radio show Dilli Ke Do Dabangg on Fever 104 FM.

With an evening drive time slot on 92.7 Big FM, he is known as the Mumbai Ka Sabse Bada Struggler with a dedicated listener-ship base of more than 2 million everyday.

=== Acting career ===
Thapliyal made his Hindi film debut in Dil Juunglee (2018) alongside Taapsee Pannu and Saqib Saleem. He gained recognition for portraying Shwetketu “SK” Jha in the web series Aspirants (2021). He later appeared in films including Raksha Bandhan and Blurr in 2022. In 2023 he appeared in Kennedy, directed by Anurag Kashyap, which premiered at the Cannes Film Festival. He later appeared in the sports drama film Maidaan (2024) starring Ajay Devgn.

=== Aspirants Season 3 ===
In 2026 he reprised his role as Shwetketu “SK” Jha in the third season of Aspirants, which premiered on Amazon Prime Video.

== Filmography ==
=== Film ===
Year	Title	Role
2018	Dil Juunglee	Prashant
2022	Raksha Bandhan	Swapnil
2022	Blurr	Chander
2023	Kennedy	Chandan
2024	Maidaan	Dev Matthew

=== Web series ===
Year	Title	Role
2017	TVF Inmates	Sukesh
2021–present	Aspirants	Shwetketu “SK” Jha
2022	Faadu – A Love Story	Roxy
2023	Shehar Lakhot	Antariksh Tyagi
2023	SK Sir Ki Class	Shwetketu “SK” Jha

=== Television ===
Year	Title	Role
2014	World Kabaddi League (Sony Six)	Host
2016	He Thand Rakh (MTV)	Actor
2018	Entertainment Ki Raat (Colors TV)	Actor
2018	Comedy Circus (Sony Entertainment Television)	Actor
2019	Apna News Aayega (Sony SAB)	Actor
2022	The Kapil Sharma Show	Guest

=== Radio ===
Year	Station	Role
2006	BIG FM 92.7	RJ Hunt finalist
2007	Radio Tarang	Radio jockey
2008–2010	UTV	Voice actor
2010	Radio One	Creative writer / promo producer
2010–2015	Fever 104 FM	Radio jockey
2016–2017	Red FM 93.5	Radio jockey
2019–present	BIG FM 92.7	Radio jockey

== Awards and recognition ==
Year	Award	Organisation	Notes
2013	New York Festivals Award	Fever 104 FM	Radio programming
2014	New York Festivals Award	Fever 104 FM	Radio programming
2015	Abby Award	Goa Fest	Radio
2017	Promax Award	MTV India	Actor
2018	Vdonxt Award	The Quint	Digital performance
2025	State recognition for contribution to entertainment	Government of Uttarakhand	Actor
