= Namita Dubey =

Indian actress

- Born: Lucknow, Uttar Pradesh, India
- Education: La Martinière College; Lady Shri Ram College; Delhi University
- Occupation: Actress
- Years active: 2013–present
- Known for: Bade Bhaiyya Ki Dulhania; Bepannah; Aspirants

Namita Dubey is an indian actress who mainly works in Hindi television and series. She is best known for playing Meera Raizada in Bade Bhaiyya Ki Dulhania, Pooja Mathur Hooda in Bepannah and Dhairya Singh in Aspirants.

== Early life ==
Dubey was born and brought up in Lucknow. She completed her education from Lucknow's La Martinière College.

== Filmography ==
=== Films ===
Year	Title	Role	Notes	Ref.
2014	Main Tera Hero	Unnamed	Cameo appearance	
2016	Lipstick Under My Burkha	Namrata		
2019	Ek Aur Chai	Sana	Short film	
2021	How to be A Good Girl	Girl	Short film	
2021	Rashmi Rocket	Priyanka Kapoor		

=== Television ===
Year	Title	Role	Notes	Ref.
2013	MTV Webbed	Zohra		
2013	Gumrah: End of Innocence	Shreya		
2014	Yeh Hai Aashiqui	Srinita Nair		
2015	Yeh Hai Aashiqui	Simran	Season 2	
2016	Yeh Hai Aashiqui	Pammi	Season 4	
2016	Bade Bhaiyya Ki Dulhania	Meera Raizada		
2018	Bepannah	Pooja Mathur		
2018	Zindagi Ke Crossroads	—N/a		

=== Web series ===
Year	Title	Role	Notes	Ref.
2020	Zebra Candy	Taish		
2021-2026	Aspirants	Dhairya Singh	3 seasons	
2022-2024	Sisters	Antara		
2024	Butterflies 5	Suhani	Episode: "To Suhani, From Disha"	
2026	Made In India: A Titan Story	Rajni Desai		
