= Filmfare OTT Award for Best Director Series =

Annual Indian television award

Filmfare OTT Awards for Best Director Series
- Country: India
- Presented by: Filmfare
- First award: 2020
- Currently held by: Vikramaditya Motwane, Satyanshu Singh, Arkesh Ajay, Ambiecka Pandit, Rohin Raveendran – Black Warrant (2025)
- Website: https://www.filmfare.com/

The Filmfare OTT Award for Best Director Series is one of the major categories of the Filmfare OTT Awards. The category primarily recognizes drama series directors released on over-the-top (OTT) platforms and is also known as Best Director Drama Series.

== Winners and nominees ==
Year	Director(s)	Series	Ref.
2020	Avinash Arun and Prosit Roy	Paatal Lok	
2020	Oni Sen	Asur	
2020	Neeraj Pandey and Shivam Nair	Special OPS	
2020	Raj & DK	The Family Man	
2021	Hansal Mehta and Jai Mehta	Scam 1992: The Harshad Mehta Story	
2021	Prakash Jha	Aashram (Season 2)	
2021	Rohan Sippy and Arjun Mukerjee	Criminal Justice: Behind Closed Doors	
2021	Ranjan Chandel	Grahan	
2021	Gurmeet Singh and Mihir Desai	Mirzapur (Season 2)	
2021	Raj & DK and Suparn S Varma	The Family Man (Season 2)	
2022	Abhay Pannu	Rocket Boys	
2022	Prakash Jha	Aashram (Season 3)	
2022	Shefali Bhushan	Guilty Minds	
2022	Nikkhil Advani and Nikhil Gonsalves	Mumbai Diaries 26/11	
2022	Ajitpal Singh	Tabbar	
2022	Ashish Shukla	Undekhi (Season 2)	
2022	Vinay Waikul	The Broken News	
2023	Vikramaditya Motwane	Jubilee	
2023	Reema Kagti and Ruchika Oberoi	Dahaad	
2023	Raj & DK	Farzi	
2023	Hansal Mehta	Scoop	
2023	Randeep Jha	Kohrra	
2023	Prashant Nair	Trial by Fire	
2023	Abhay Pannu	Rocket Boys (Season 2)	
2023	Avinash Arun	School of Lies	
2023	Tanuj Chopra	Delhi Crime (Season 2)	
2024	Sameer Saxena And Amit Golani	Kaala Paani	
2024	Raj & DK	Guns & Gulaabs	
2024	Sanjay Leela Bhansali	Heeramandi	
2024	Abhishek Chaubey	Killer Soup	
2024	Pratish Mehta	Kota Factory (Season 3)	
2024	Shiv Rawail	The Railway Men	
2024	Nikkhil Advani	Mumbai Diaries (Season 2)	
2025	Vikramaditya Motwane, Satyanshu Singh, Arkesh Ajay, Ambiecka Pandit, Rohin Raveendran	Black Warrant	
2025	Nagesh Kukunoor	The Hunt: The Rajiv Gandhi Assassination Case	
2025	Nikkhil Advani	Freedom at Midnight	
2025	Pushkar Sunil Mahabal	Black, White & Gray - Love Kills	
2025	Pankaj Kumar and Surya Balakrishnan	Khauf	
2025	Avinash Arun	Paatal Lok (Season 2)	
2025	Anubhav Sinha	IC 814: The Kandahar Hijack	
