= 2022 Filmfare OTT Awards =

2022 OTT film awards in India

- Awarded for: Excellence in OTT content
- Date: 21 December 2022
- Country: India
- Presented by: Filmfare
- Hosted by: Gauahar Khan; Maniesh Paul
- First award: 19 December 2020

Highlights
- Most awards: Rocket Boys & Tabbar (8)
- Most nominations: Rocket Boys (15)
- Best Drama Series: Tabbar
- Best Comedy Series: Gullak (Season 3)
- Best Film - Web Originals: Dasvi
- Best Non - Fiction Original (Series): House of Secrets: The Burari Deaths
- Best Series (Critics): Tabbar
- Website: 2022 OTT Awards

2022 Filmfare OTT Awards, the third edition of awards were presented to honour artistic and technical excellence in original programming on over-the-top streaming media in Hindi-language. Web original shows or films released across OTT platforms between 1 August 2021 and 31 July 2022 were eligible for Awards. Nominations were announced by Filmfare on 14 December 2022. Hosted by Gauahar Khan and Maniesh Paul, the ceremony was held on 21 December 2022 in Mumbai.

Rocket Boys led the ceremony with 15 nominations, followed by Panchayat (Season 2) with 13 nominations, Tabbar with 11 nominations and Mumbai Diaries 26/11 with 10 nominations.

Rocket Boys and Tabbar won 8 awards each, with the former winning Best Drama Series, Best Director in a Drama Series (for Abhay Pannu) and Best Actor in a Drama Series (Critics) (for Jim Sarbh), and the latter winning Best Series (Critics), Best Director in a Series (Critics) (for Ajitpal Singh), Best Actor in a Drama Series (for Pavan Malhotra), Best Supporting Actor in a Drama Series (for Gagan Arora) and Best Supporting Actress in a Drama Series (for Supriya Pathak), thus becoming the most-awarded series at the ceremony.

== Winners and nominees ==
Sources: nominations

Sources: winners

- Winners denoted in **boldface**

=== Popular awards ===
Drama Series
Best Series	Best Director
**Rocket Boys** – SonyLIV; Aashram (Season 3) – MX Player; Apharan (Season 2) – Voot; Guilty Minds – Amazon Prime Video; Mumbai Diaries 26/11 – Amazon Prime Video; Tabbar – SonyLIV	**Abhay Pannu – Rocket Boys**; Ajitpal Singh – Tabbar; Ashish Shukla – Undekhi (Season 2); Nikkhil Advani and Nikhil Gonsalves – Mumbai Diaries 26/11; Prakash Jha – Aashram (Season 3); Shefali Bhushan – Guilty Minds; Vinay Waikul – The Broken News
Best Actor (Male)	Best Actor (Female)
**Pavan Malhotra – Tabbar**; Bobby Deol – Aashram (Season 3); Ishwak Singh – Rocket Boys; Jim Sarbh – Rocket Boys; Mohit Raina – Mumbai Diaries 26/11; Varun Mitra – Guilty Minds; Viineet Kumar – Rangbaaz (Season 3)	**Raveena Tandon – Aranyak**; Amruta Subhash – Saas Bahu Achaar Pvt. Ltd.; Madhuri Dixit – The Fame Game; Sakshi Tanwar – Mai; Shefali Shah – Human; Shriya Pilgaonkar – Guilty Minds; Sushmita Sen – Aarya (Season 2)
Best Supporting Actor (Male)	Best Supporting Actor (Female)
**Gagan Arora – Tabbar**; Ashutosh Rana – The Great Indian Murder; Chandan Roy Sanyal – Aashram (Season 3); Piyush Mishra – Illegal (Season 2); Rajesh Tailang – Rangbaaz (Season 3); Vishal Jethwa – Human	**Supriya Pathak – Tabbar**; Konkona Sen Sharma – Mumbai Diaries 26/11; Regina Cassandra – Rocket Boys; Shabana Azmi – The Empire; Shweta Tripathi – Escaype Live; Sonali Bendre – The Broken News
Comedy Series
Best Series / Special
**Gullak (Season 3)** – SonyLIV; Ghar Waapsi – Disney+ Hotstar; Home Shanti – Disney+ Hotstar; Kota Factory (Season 2) – Netflix; Little Things (Season 4) – Netflix; Panchayat (Season 2) – Amazon Prime Video
Best Actor (Male)	Best Actor (Female)
**Jameel Khan – Gullak (Season 3)** as Santosh Mishra (Papa); Bhuvan Bam – Dhindora; Dhruv Sehgal – Little Things (Season 4); Jitendra Kumar – Kota Factory (Season 2); Jitendra Kumar – Panchayat (Season 2); R. Madhavan – Decoupled	**Geetanjali Kulkarni – Gullak (Season 3)** as Shanti Mishra (Mummy); Anushka Kaushik – Ghar Waapsi; Masaba Gupta – Masaba Masaba (Season 2); Mithila Palkar – Little Things (Season 4); Supriya Pathak – Home Shanti; Surveen Chawla – Decoupled
Best Supporting Actor (Male)	Best Supporting Actor (Female)
**Raghubir Yadav – Panchayat (Season 2)**; Chandan Roy – Panchayat (Season 2); Faisal Malik – Panchayat (Season 2); Harsh Mayar – Gullak (Season 3); Manoj Pahwa – Home Shanti; Ranjan Raj – Kota Factory (Season 2)	**Neena Gupta – Panchayat (Season 2)**; Neena Gupta – Masaba Masaba (Season 2); Sanvikaa – Panchayat (Season 2); Sunita Rajwar – Gullak (Season 3); Sunita Rajwar – Panchayat (Season 2)
Web Originals
Best Film
**Dasvi** – Netflix; A Thursday – Disney+ Hotstar; Jaadugar – Netflix; Kaun Pravin Tambe? – Disney+ Hotstar; Looop Lapeta – Netflix; Meenakshi Sundareshwar – Netflix; Thar – Netflix
Best Actor (Male)	Best Actor (Female)
**Abhishek Bachchan – Dasvi**; Abhimanyu Dassani – Meenakshi Sundareshwar; Harshvardhan Kapoor – Thar; Kartik Aaryan – Dhamaka; Shreyas Talpade – Kaun Pravin Tambe?; Vikrant Massey – Forensic	**Taapsee Pannu – Looop Lapeta**; Fatima Sana Shaikh – Thar; Radhika Apte – Forensic; Sanya Malhotra – Meenakshi Sundareshwar; Yami Gautam – A Thursday
Best Supporting Actor (Male)	Best Supporting Actor (Female)
**Anil Kapoor – Thar**; Abhishek Banerjee – Helmet; Atul Kulkarni – A Thursday; Javed Jaffrey – Jaadugar; Jitendra Joshi – Thar	**Mita Vashisht – Chhorii**; Amruta Subhash – Dhamaka; Neha Dhupia – A Thursday; Pranutan Bahl – Helmet; Shreya Dhanwanthary – Looop Lapeta
Best Non – Fiction Original (Series)
**House of Secrets: The Burari Deaths** – Netflix; Break Point – ZEE5; Comicstaan (Season 3) – Amazon Prime Video; Koffee with Karan (Season 7) – Disney+ Hotstar; One Mic Stand (Season 2) – Amazon Prime Video; Shut Up Sona – ZEE5
Writing Awards
Best Original Story (Series)	Best Dialogues
**Harman Wadala, Sandeep Jain and Mr. Roy – Tabbar**; Abhay Pannu, Abhay Koranne – Rocket Boys; Ameya Sarda, Deepak Segal – Undekhi (Season 2); Chandan Kumar – Panchayat (Season 2); Prakash Jha – Aashram (Season 3); Siddharth Sengupta, Umesh Padalkar, Anahata Menon – Apharan (Season 2)	**Chandan Kumar – Panchayat (Season 2)**; Durgesh Singh – Gullak (Season 3); Kausar Munir, Abhay Pannu – Rocket Boys; Saurabh Khanna, Abhishek Yadav, Puneet Batra, Manoj Kalwani – Kota Factory (Season 2); Tatsat Pandey, Bharat Misra – Ghar Waapsi; Varun Badola – Yeh Kaali Kaali Ankhein
Best Screenplay	Best Adapted Screenplay
**Abhay Pannu and Shiv Singh – Rocket Boys**; Atul Mongia, Tamal Sen, Amita Vyas – Mai; Chandan Kumar – Panchayat (Season 2); Charudutt Acharya – Aranyak; Harman Wadala, Sandeep Jain and Mr. Roy – Tabbar; Tatsat Pandey, Bharat Misra – Ghar Waapsi	**Nikhil Gonsalves, Anushka Mehrotra and Yash Chetija – Mumbai Diaries 26/11**; Sambit Mishra – The Broken News; Sanyuktha Chawla Shaikh, Anu Singh Choudhary – Aarya (Season 2); Tigmanshu Dhulia, Vijay Maurya, Puneet Sharma – The Great Indian Murder
Music Awards
Best Background Music (Series)	Best Original Soundtrack (Series)
**Sneha Khanwalkar – Tabbar**; Achint Thakkar – Rocket Boys; Anurag Saikia – Gullak (Season 3); Anurag Saikia – Panchayat (Season 2); Sagar Desai – Guilty Minds; Tusshar Mallek – Ghar Waapsi	**Shivam Sengupta and Anuj Danait – Yeh Kaali Kaali Ankhein**; Achint Thakkar – Rocket Boys; Raghu Dixit – "Title Song" – The Great Indian Murder; Ram Sampath – "Raat Rani" – Modern Love Mumbai; Simran Hora, Vaibhav Bundhoo – Kota Factory (Season 2); Vishal Bhardwaj – "Raat Bhar" – Modern Love Mumbai ("Mumbai Dragon")
Technical Awards
Best Editing
**Parikshhit Jha – Tabbar**; A. Sreekar Prasad – Modern Love Mumbai ("Mumbai Dragon"); Maahir Zaveri – Mumbai Diaries 26/11; Maahir Zaveri – Rocket Boys; Nikhill Parihar – Rangbaaz (Season 3); Yasha Ramchandani – Aranyak
Best Production Design	Best Cinematographer
**Meghna Gandhi – Rocket Boys**; Anna Ipe – Aarya (Season 2); Priya Suhas – Mumbai Diaries 26/11; Priya Suhas – The Empire; Vikram Singh – Guilty Minds; Vipin Kamboj – Tabbar	**Harshvir Oberai – Rocket Boys**; Arun Kumar Pandey – Rangbaaz (Season 3); Arun Kumar Pandey – Tabbar; Kaushal Shah – Mumbai Diaries 26/11; Saurabh Goswami – Aranyak; Tassaduq Hussain – Modern Love Mumbai ("Mumbai Dragon")
Best Costume Design	Best VFX
**Biju Antony and Uma Biju – Rocket Boys**; Priyadarshini Mujumdar – Panchayat (Season 2); Radhika Mehra – Human; Sheetal Sharma – Mumbai Diaries 26/11; Sheetal Sharma – The Empire; Theia Tekchandaney – Aarya (Season 2)	**Variate Studio – Rocket Boys**; Anibrain – Aranyak; Futureworks – Mumbai Diaries 26/11; Futureworks – The Empire; One Line VFX – Escaype Live

=== Critics' Choice Awards ===
Best Series	Best Director (Series)
**Tabbar** – SonyLIV	**Ajitpal Singh – Tabbar**
Best Actor (Male): Drama	Best Actor (Female): Drama
**Jim Sarbh – Rocket Boys as Dr. Homi J. Bhabha**	**Sakshi Tanwar – Mai as Sheel Chaudhary**
Best Actor (Male): Comedy	Best Actor (Female): Comedy
**Jitendra Kumar – Panchayat (Season 2) as Abhishek Tripathi**	**Mithila Palkar – Little Things (Season 4) as Kavya Kulkarni**

== Superlatives ==
=== Nominations and wins by program ===
Nominations by program
Nominations	Program	Streaming Media
15	Rocket Boys	SonyLIV
13	Panchayat (Season 2)	Amazon Prime Video
11	Tabbar	SonyLIV
10	Mumbai Diaries 26/11	Amazon Prime Video
7	Gullak (Season 3)	SonyLIV
6	Guilty Minds	Amazon Prime Video
5	Aashram (Season 3)	MX Player
5	Aranyak	Netflix
5	Ghar Waapsi	Disney+ Hotstar
5	Kota Factory (Season 2)	Netflix
5	Thar	Netflix
4	A Thursday	Disney+ Hotstar
4	Aarya (Season 2)	Disney+ Hotstar
4	Modern Love Mumbai	Amazon Prime Video
4	Rangbaaz (Season 3)	ZEE5
4	The Empire	Disney+ Hotstar
3	Home Shanti	Disney+ Hotstar
3	Human	Disney+ Hotstar
3	Little Things (Season 4)	Netflix
3	Looop Lapeta	Netflix
3	Meenakshi Sundareshwar	Netflix
3	The Broken News	ZEE5
3	The Great Indian Murder	Disney+ Hotstar
2	Apharan (Season 2)	Voot
2	Dasvi	Netflix
2	Decoupled	Netflix
2	Dhamaka	Netflix
2	Escaype Live	Disney+ Hotstar
2	Forensic	ZEE5
2	Helmet	ZEE5
2	Jaadugar	Netflix
2	Kaun Pravin Tambe?	Disney+ Hotstar
2	Mai	Netflix
2	Masaba Masaba	Netflix
2	Undekhi (Season 2)	SonyLIV
2	Yeh Kaali Kaali Ankhein	Netflix

Wins by program
Wins	Program	Streaming Media
8	Rocket Boys	SonyLIV
8	Tabbar	SonyLIV
4	Panchayat (Season 2)	Amazon Prime Video
3	Gullak (Season 3)	SonyLIV
2	Dasvi	Netflix

=== Nominations and wins by streaming media ===
Nominations by streaming media
Nominations	Streaming Media
40	Netflix
36	Amazon Prime Video
35	SonyLIV
34	Disney+ Hotstar
14	ZEE5
5	MX Player
2	Voot

Wins by Streaming Media
Wins	Streaming Media
19	SonyLIV
9	Netflix
6	Amazon Prime Video

== See also ==
- Filmfare Awards
- 67th Filmfare Awards
- 2021 Filmfare OTT Awards
