= Anushka Kaushik =

Indian actress

- Born: July 21, 1999 (age 27); Saharanpur, Uttar Pradesh, India
- Occupation: Actress
- Years active: 2018–present
- Known for: Crash Course, Ghar Waapsi, Patna Shuklla

Anushka Kaushik (born 21 July 1999) is an Indian actress who appears in Hindi-language films and web series. She is known for her performance in the Amazon Prime Video series Crash Course (2022), for which she was nominated for Best Actress (Drama Series) at the 2022 Filmfare OTT Awards, and for her role in the Disney+ Hotstar series Ghar Waapsi (2022). She also played a parallel lead role in a Hindi film Patna Shuklla (2024).

== Early life and education ==
Kaushik hails from Saharanpur, Uttar Pradesh. She moved to Delhi for higher education and was active in dramatics during her college years before relocating to Mumbai to pursue acting.

== Career ==
Kaushik began her career by acting in short videos.

In 2022, she appeared in the Amazon Prime Video series Crash Course, portraying Vidhi Gupta, a student navigating the competitive coaching world in Kota. The same year, she played a lead role in the Disney+ Hotstar family drama Ghar Waapsi, which earned her a nomination for Best Actress (Drama Series) at the Filmfare OTT Awards.

In 2023, Kaushik starred in Garmi, a political thriller on Sony LIV, directed by Tigmanshu Dhulia. In 2024, she played a parallel lead alongside Raveena Tandon in the courtroom drama film Patna Shuklla, a role for which the actress worked on her Bhojpuri accent.

In 2024, she also appeared in the youth-oriented web series Namacool, alongside Hina Khan and Abhishek Bajaj.

== Filmography ==
=== Films ===
- Ujda Chaman (2019) – Apsara’s sister
- Thar (2022) – Supporting role
- Patna Shuklla (2024) - Rinki Kumari – Parallel lead

=== Web series ===
- Who's Your Daddy? (2020) –
- Ghar Waapsi (2022) – Suruchi Dwivedi
- Crash Course (2022) – Vidhi Gupta
- Garmi (2023) – Ruchita
- Maharani Season 2 (2022) - Shilpa Agarwal – Supporting role
- Lust Stories 2 (2023) – Rekha
- Namacool (2024) - Minty – Lead
- Jamnapaar (2025) – Princy

== Awards and nominations ==
Kaushik was nominated for Best Actress (Drama Series) at the 2022 Filmfare OTT Awards for her performance in Ghar Waapsi.
