= Human (TV series) =

Indian Television Series

- Genre: Medical thriller
- Written by: Season 1: Ishani Banerjee; Arjun Bhandegaonkar; Aasif Moyal; Stuti Nair; Nishchal Shome; Darshan Prakaash Aka Abhishek Pandey; Mozez Singh
- Directed by: Season 1: Vipul Amrutlal Shah; Mozez Singh
- Starring: Shefali Shah; Kirti Kulhari; Vishal Jethwa; Ram Kapoor; Mohan Agashe; Seema Biswas; Aditya Srivastav; Gaurav Dwivedi
- Country of origin: India
- No. of seasons: 1
- No. of episodes: 10

Production
- Producers: Season 1: Vipul Amrutlal Shah; Aashin Shah
- Cinematography: Sirsha Ray
- Editor: Zubin Sheikh

Human is an Indian 2022 medical thriller television series released on 14 January 2022 on Disney+ Hotstar, which portrays the underbelly of human drug testing and the world of medical scams and aims to expose the nexus between pharmaceutical companies, large private hospitals, and government officials who exploit the poor in human trials for new drugs.

At the 2022 Filmfare OTT Awards, Human received 3 nominations, including Best Actress in a Drama Series (Shah) and Best Supporting Actor in a Drama Series (Jethwa).

== Cast ==
- Shefali Shah as Dr. Gauri Nath
- Kirti Kulhari as Dr. Saira Sabharwal
- Vishal Jethwa as Mangu
- Riddhi Kumar as Deepali
- Indraneil Sengupta as Neil
- Shruti Bapna as Sucheta Shekhawat
- Seema Biswas as Roma
- Aditya Srivastav as Ashok Vaidya
- Aasif Khan as Omar Pervez
- Atul Kumar as Dr. Snehal Shindey
- Ram Kapoor as Pratap Munjal
- Rahul Tiwari Adhiyari as Balram
- Mohan Agashe as Mohan Vaidya
- Sandeep Kulkarni as Pramod Ahuja
- Ansha Sayed as Shalini
- Siddhanth Karnick as Ravish
- Pranali Ghogare as Meena
- Rishi Deshpande as Dr. Akash Swarup
- Purnima Rathod as Sulochana Nath
- Jagat Rawat as Saira's Father
- Shabnam Vadhera as Saira's Mother
- Abhijit Lahiri as Nathu Lal
- Govind Pandey as Chandrakant Shankar
- Gaurav Dwivedi as Dr. Vivek Shekhawat
- Sushil Pandey as Mangu's Father
- Shadab Siddiqui as Dr. Deepak
- Rama Krishna Dixit as Raghav Chandra
- Mark Bennington as Dr. Ross
- Hansa Singh as Dr. Gul Goyal
- Jitendra khilnani as Mangu's friend

== Accolades ==
| Year | Award ceremony | Category | Nominee / work | Result | Ref. |
|---|---|---|---|---|---|
| 2022 | Filmfare OTT Awards | Best Actress in a Drama Series | Shefali Shah | Nominated | |
| 2022 | Filmfare OTT Awards | Best Supporting Actor in a Drama Series | Vishal Jethwa | Nominated | |
| 2022 | Filmfare OTT Awards | Best Costume Design (Series) | Radhika Mehra | Nominated | |
