= Aranyak (TV series) =

Indian television series

- Release poster
- Genre: Crime; thriller; mystery
- Written by: Charudutt Acharya; Rohan Sippy
- Directed by: Vinay Waikul
- Starring: Raveena Tandon; Parambrata Chatterjee; Ashutosh Rana; Taneesha Joshi; Anna Ador; Zakir Hussain; Meghna Malik
- Country of origin: India
- Original language: Hindi
- No. of seasons: 1
- No. of episodes: 8

Production
- Producers: Siddharth Roy Kapur; Ramesh Sippy; Rohan Sippy
- Cinematography: Saurabh Goswami
- Editor: Yasha Ramchandani
- Running time: 37–48 minutes
- Production companies: Ramesh Sippy Entertainment; Roy Kapur Films

Original release
- Network: Netflix
- Release: 10 December 2021

Aranyak is a 2021 Indian Hindi-language Netflix crime thriller television series created by Charudutt Acharya and Rohan Sippy, directed by Vinay Waikul, and starring Raveena Tandon, Parambrata Chatterjee, Ashutosh Rana, Taneesha Joshi, Anna Ador, Zakir Hussain, and Meghna Malik.

At the 2022 Filmfare OTT Awards, Aranyak received five nominations, including Best Original Screenplay (Series) for Charudutt Acharya. Raveena Tandon won Best Actress in a Drama Series.

== Synopsis ==
In the fictional Himachal Pradesh town of Sironah and Cyberabad, Hyderabad, two morally upright officers, both battling their own inner demons, try to find the person responsible for the alleged rape and murder of a teenage girl who had ostensibly come to spend the holidays with her mother, a foreign national, in the picturesque town.

== Cast and characters ==
- Raveena Tandon as Kasturi Dogra
- Parambrata Chatterjee as Angad Malik
- Ashutosh Rana as Mahadev Dogra
- Taneesha Joshi as Nutan Dogra
- Anna Ador as Aimee Baptiste
- Zakir Hussain as Kuber Manhas
- Meghna Malik as Jagdamba Dumal
- Indraneil Sengupta as Ravi Parashar
- Breshna Khan as Julie Baptiste
- Priyanka Sethi as Nilima Manhas
- Milind Shinde as Nandan

== Release ==
Aranyak was released on Netflix on 10 December 2021.

== Reception ==
Ronak Kotecha of The Times of India reviewed the series, stating: "Raveena & Parambrata's nuanced chemistry powers this whodunit"

Anuj Kumar of The Hindu wrote: "Aranyak season one review: Raveena Tandon aces Netflix whodunit, aided by the fantastic writing"

Shubhra Gupta of The Indian Express stated, "Raveena Tandon is unafraid of appearing uncouth and crude, and is able to toughen up and soften when the occasion demands, even if the unsophisticated accent slips."

Outlook reviewed the series positively, writing, "Netflix's recently released drama thriller has all those typical elements one would find in a drama thriller, yet the writers have left a few loops open, to keep the viewers guessing if a second season might be on the cards as well."

Saraswati Datar of The News Minute called it "an engaging crime thriller".

Praising the performance of the cast, NDTV stated that "Ashutosh Rana, as a former cop determined to prove himself all over again, is splendidly low-key and yet high on impact. Zakir Hussain, Meghna Malik, Indraneil Sengupta and Breshna Khan, too, make noteworthy contributions on the acting front."

== Accolades ==
Year	Award ceremony	Category	Nominee / work	Result	Ref.
2022	Filmfare OTT Awards	Best Actress in a Drama Series	Raveena Tandon	Won	
2022	Filmfare OTT Awards	Best Original Screenplay (Series)	Charudutt Acharya	Nominated	
2022	Filmfare OTT Awards	Best Editing (Series)	Yasha Ramchandani	Nominated	
2022	Filmfare OTT Awards	Best Cinematographer (Series)	Saurabh Goswami	Nominated	
2022	Filmfare OTT Awards	Best VFX (Series)	Anibrain	Nominated	
