= A Thursday =

2022 Indian film by Behzad Khambata

- Theatrical release poster
- Directed by: Behzad Khambata
- Written by: Behzad Khambata
- Story by: Ashley Michael Lobo; Behzad Khambata
- Dialogues by: Vijay Maurya
- Produced by: Ronnie Screwvala; Premnath Rajagopalan
- Starring: Yami Gautam; Atul Kulkarni; Neha Dhupia; Dimple Kapadia; Karanvir Sharma
- Cinematography: Anuj Rakesh Dhawan; Siddharth Vasani
- Edited by: Sumeet Kotian
- Music by: Rooshin Dalal; Kaizad Gherda
- Production companies: RSVP Movies; Blue Monkey Films
- Distributed by: Disney+ Hotstar
- Release date: 17 February 2022
- Running time: 129 minutes
- Country: India
- Language: Hindi

A Thursday is a 2022 Indian Hindi-language psychological thriller film written and directed by Behzad Khambata. The film stars Yami Gautam, Atul Kulkarni, Neha Dhupia, Dimple Kapadia, and Karanvir Sharma. It premiered on Disney+ Hotstar on 17 February 2022. It received mixed reviews from critics, although Gautam's performance was praised. The story follows a mentally unstable woman who seizes sixteen children, triggering a tense hostage negotiation. As the standoff intensifies, two investigating officers uncover a disturbing truth: the woman knows them from a traumatic event in her past, and they may be directly tied to the situation.

At the 2022 Filmfare OTT Awards, A Thursday received 4 nominations – Best Web Original Film, Best Actress in a Web Original Film (Gautam), Best Supporting Actor in a Web Original Film (Kulkarni) and Best Supporting Actress in a Web Original Film (Dhupia).

== Plot ==
Naina Jaiswal, a teacher at the Little Tots play school in Colaba, Mumbai, who had been on leave for three weeks, unexpectedly returns a week early. The school is located in front of the property owned by Rohit Mirchandani, Naina's fiancé, where Rohit & Naina live. Parents drop off their children, and Naina asks one of the female parents to send a cake for her daughter Niharika's birthday, delivered by the parent's driver. After setting up a cartoon for the kids to watch, Naina calls the police station and informs them that she has taken 16 children as hostages. Niharika's driver arrives with a cake and Savitri, the helper, returns to the school after forgetting her phone; both are taken hostages.

The police suspect it is a hoax, until Naina fires shots in the air. ACP Catherine Alvarez contacts her, but Naina says that she will negotiate only with officer Javed Khan. Javed is brought to the scene, and she tells him that she will free one child for every demand he meets, or else she will kill each child in alphabetical order, starting with Aakash. Her first demand is for a transfer of ₹5 crore to her bank account. Catherine and Javed, who shared a romantic history, are incompatible when working together. Catherine sends armed police inside, against Javed's will. Enraged, Naina kills Aakash while being live on national television. The Commissioner of Police places Javed in charge and assigns Catherine to research about Naina.

Naina's second demand is to speak to the Prime Minister, Maya Rajguru. Rajguru talks to Naina on the phone, but Naina urges her to meet her in person. Naina then tells Javed to find and bring Rakesh Mathur and Charan Kumar, from a school in Goregaon. The police capture Rakesh, but are unable to locate Charan.

During a background check, Catherine learns that Naina has been taking antidepressants and seeing a psychiatrist, Dr. Juneja, since she was 16. She searches Naina's house and finds receipts for medication prescribed by Dr. Juneja. Catherine contacts her, and Javed gets hold of Naina's mother Kusum, whose revelation comes across as a brutal shock to Javed; Naina was raped when she was 16, and Javed and Catherine were then officers in charge of the case. They neglected Naina's case, since they were pursuing a high-profile case to gain recognition. After begging them to help for two years, Kusum became resigned to their indifference; in the present, she blames Javed for being the root cause of the drama due to his and Catherine's inaction.

Rajguru decides to meet Naina in person, accompanied by Javed, after Naina releases Savitri along with Aakash, whom she had spared. Naina brings up the Protection of Children from Sexual Offenses Act, which protects children below the age of 18 from sexual offenses. Naina asks Rajguru why is there no protection for people over 18, and demands that her rapists face the death penalty. Rajguru tells her that legislation is a complex task that requires time, but her rapists are found and imprisoned.

It is revealed that the driver is actually Charan, who had raped Naina as a child, while Rakesh restrained her. Naina had plotted to kidnap him when he reveals that he is Niharika's driver while holding her hand, much to Naina's shock. She shoots him dead in the presence of Rajguru and Javed. Armed Commandos enter the school and arrest Naina. She is taken to prison, and later, is assigned a teacher for the female inmates, while Rajguru makes an announcement that the capital punishment for rapists will be a death penalty.

== Cast ==
- Yami Gautam as Naina Jaiswal
- Atul Kulkarni as Javed Khan, ex-husband of Cathy
- Neha Dhupia as ACP Catherine "Cathy" Alvarez, ex-wife of Javed
- Dimple Kapadia as Prime Minister Maya Rajguru
- Karanvir Sharma as Rohit Mirchandani, Naina's fiancé
- Maya Sarao as Shalini Guha, Naina's friend Yash's mother
- Sukesh Anand as Lokhande
- Kalyanee Mulay as Savitri, Naina's maid
- Boloram Das as Charan Kumar, Naina's rapist and Niharika's family driver
- Shubhangi Latkar as Kusum Jaiswal, Naina's mother
- Adi Irani as Police Commissioner
- Divjyot Kaur as Renuka Dubey
- Micky Makhija as Rohit's father
- Sanjeev Jotangia as Malcolm
- Sulagna Chatterjee as Aakash's mom
- Bhavin Hirani as Aakash's dad
- Raj Kumar sharma as Home Minister
- Asim Sharma as PM PR REP
- Hardika Sharma as Niharika (play school student)
- Prachi Hada as journalist

== Production ==
Principal photography began on 12 March 2021, and wrapped in July of that year.

== Reception ==
On the review aggregator website Rotten Tomatoes, 13% of 8 critics' reviews are positive, with an average rating of 4.9/10.

Cyril of India Today gave the film a rating of four out of five and wrote, "Yami Gautam's A Thursday is the kind of thriller that has been missing from Indian screens for a while." Renuka Vyavahare of The Times of India rated it three out of five and wrote, "Despite a rather predictable backstory, A Thursday redeems itself with its powerful emotional arc and social commentary in the latter half. It touches upon a relevant issue that will resonate with women across the globe."

Pradeep Menon of Firstpost gave the film a rating of 2.75 out of five and wrote, "A Thursday strives to be urgent, relevant and cool, but succeeds only partially, because it stops to make a point far too often." Shubhra Gupta of The Indian Express rated the film 1.5 out of five and wrote, "The chief problem with Yami Gautam's film is that we do not take any of this seriously, whether it is Naina brandishing a gun, or snarling and cooing at her hostages."

== Accolades ==
Year	Award ceremony	Category	Nominee / work	Result	Ref.
2022	Filmfare OTT Awards	Best Web Original Film	A Thursday	Nominated	
2022	Filmfare OTT Awards	Best Actress in a Web Original Film	Yami Gautam	Nominated	
2022	Filmfare OTT Awards	Best Supporting Actor in a Web Original Film	Atul Kulkarni	Nominated	
2022	Filmfare OTT Awards	Best Supporting Actress in a Web Original Film	Neha Dhupia	Won	

== Soundtrack ==
A Thursday

Soundtrack album by Rooshin Dalal and Kaizad Gherda
- Released: 24 February 2022
- Recorded: 2021
- Genre: Feature-film soundtrack
- Length: 42:51
- Language: Hindi
- Label: RSVP Movies
- Producers: Rooshin Dalal, Kaizad Gherda

Official audio
- A Thursday - Full Album on YouTube

The soundtrack to A Thursday contains twenty-one instrumental compositions used in the film score, curated and composed by Rooshin Dalal and Kaizad Gherda.

Track listing
No.	Title	Length
1.	"Naina theme song"	1:50
2.	"The first call"	1:37
3.	"The Playschool"	1:17
4.	"The Quite"	0:43
5.	"Demand"	1:06
6.	"Wash your hands"	0:58
7.	"A for Akash"	2:06
8.	"Alvarez and Khan"	0:53
9.	"Back off Javed"	2:10
10.	"Naina's Mind"	1:03
11.	"Phir se bolna"	0:56
12.	"Maya Rajguru"	1:38
13.	"Rock a Bye Baby" (Sung by Deelraz Bunshah)	3:47
14.	"The interview"	3:30
15.	"Birthday Cake"	2:07
16.	"Case"	2:04
17.	"A Thursday"	6:28
18.	"Let go"	2:34
19.	"Do you know what it feels like"	3:23
20.	"Stand off"	1:31
21.	"The Last shot"	1:10
Total length:		42:51
