= Rocket Boys (TV series) =

Indian Hindi-language biographical series

- Genre: Drama
- Created by: Nikkhil Advani
- Written by: Dialogues: Kausar Munir; Abhay Pannu
- Screenplay by: Abhay Pannu
- Story by: Abhay Koranne
- Directed by: Abhay Pannu
- Starring: Jim Sarbh; Ishwak Singh; Regina Cassandra; Arjun Radhakrishnan; Saba Azad; Dibyendu Bhattacharya; Rajit Kapur
- Music by: Achint Thakkar
- Country of origin: India
- Original language: Hindi
- No. of seasons: 2
- No. of episodes: 16

Production
- Executive producers: Malvika Khatri; Rameshchandra Yadav
- Producers: Siddharth Roy Kapur; Monisha Advani; Madhu Bhojwani
- Cinematography: Harshvir Oberai
- Editor: Maahir Zaveri
- Running time: 35–40 minutes
- Production companies: Roy Kapur Films; Emmay Entertainment

Original release
- Network: SonyLIV
- Release: February 4, 2022 – March 16, 2023

Rocket Boys is an Indian Hindi-language biographical streaming television series on SonyLIV based on the lives of Homi J. Bhabha and Vikram Sarabhai. It is directed by Abhay Pannu and produced by Siddharth Roy Kapur with Monisha Advani, and Madhu Bhojwani under the banners Roy Kapur Films and Emmay Entertainment, respectively. The series stars Jim Sarbh and Ishwak Singh along with Regina Cassandra.

The web series was released on 4 February 2022 exclusively on SonyLIV.

Rocket Boys Season 2 was released on 16 March 2023, exclusively on Sony LIV. The first look for the second season was unveiled on 15 August 2022, on the 75th Indian Independence Day, while the second teaser was released on 12 February 2023. The second teaser focuses on how imperative it was for India to become a nuclear nation amidst imminent global threats of war resulting in India's first nuclear test also known as Pokhran I in 1974. The series will cover the incredible journey of India's greatest scientists as they shape a new era where no one dared to challenge their country's sovereignty. Jim Sarbh earned a Best Actor nomination at 51st International Emmy Awards for his role as Dr. Homi J. Bhabha.

== Synopsis ==
=== Season 1 ===
Rocket Boys is a story of two extraordinary men Dr. Homi J. Bhabha and Dr. Vikram Sarabhai. The story is set around the three crucial decades (1940-60s) in the history of India and how the nation is moving towards being a strong, brave, and independent nation. It is the story of Independent India's formative years in the field of science.

With their dream and visions in their mind, Dr. Homi J. Bhabha engineered India's Nuclear Programme and Dr. Vikram Sarabhai established the Indian Space Programme and many other institutes. Their journey also involves Mrinalini Sarabhai, Dr. A. P. J. Abdul Kalam, who pioneered modern Indian aerospace and nuclear technology, Parvana Irani a close friend of Dr. Bhabha, Raza Mehdi (not a real person but a fictional character scripted as an antagonist for dramatization), a scientist, and Pandit Jawaharlal Nehru who supported them at every step.

The season depicts their friendship, sacrifice, and determination leading to India's first rocket launch. The story is presented as emblematic of the journey of India as the country emerges into a new, post-war world.

=== Season 2 ===
The second season of Rocket Boys takes place during the early years of independent India when the nation was experiencing political unrest, internal power shifts, and international organizations keeping a close watch on its aspirations. The series continues the account of the extraordinary lives and times of Dr. Homi J. Bhabha, Dr. Vikram Sarabhai, and Dr. A.P.J. Abdul Kalam as they navigate obstacles in their quest to make India a nuclear power.

== Cast ==
- Jim Sarbh as Dr. Homi J. Bhabha
- Ishwak Singh as Dr. Vikram Sarabhai
- Regina Cassandra as Mrinalini Sarabhai
- Saba Azad as Parvana Irani "Pipsy"
- Rajit Kapur as Jawaharlal Nehru
- T.M. Karthik as C. V. Raman
- Dibyendu Bhattacharya as Raza Mehdi
- Namit Das as Prosenjit Dey
- Arjun Radhakrishnan as Dr. A. P. J. Abdul Kalam
- K.C. Shankar as Vishwesh Mathur
- Neha Chauhan as Kamla Chowdhry
- Abhinav Grover as Atulya Mohan
- Rajeev Kachroo as JRD Tata
- Darious Shroff as Jehangir Bhabha
- Anahita Uberoi as Mehreen Bhabha
- Mark Bennington as Robert Crowley
- Arjun Dwivedi as Lt Col Sabharwal
- Ed Robinson as Agent Miller
- Benedict Garrett as William Colby
- Charu Shanker as Indira Gandhi
- Swattee Thakur as Mallika Sarabhai
- Grace Girdhar as young Mallika Sarabhai
- Rahul Dev Shetty as Raja Ramanna
- Nilanjan Datta as Pranab Rebatiranjan Dastidar
- Vijay Kasyap as Lal Bahadur Shastri

== Production ==
The Hari Mahal Palace in Jaipur was used as a location of the "Retreat", the Sarabhai family house. The art team met Mallika Sarabhai, daughter of Sarabhai, for detailed information about their home, culture, environment and lifestyle. Every piece of technology had to be meticulously reconstructed down to details like radios, typewriters and scientific equipment.Homi bhabha's home "Mehrangir" was recreated in a studio bungalow in Naigaon, on the outskirts of Mumbai. The architecture shown in the series had to change to reflect the change in time period as a result of which the scenes taking place in the '40s take place in rooms that are well drenched by sunlight compared to the scenes taking place in the '60s where conversations between characters are set in the dark gloom of dawn, dusk and nighttime, reflecting not only the change in time period but also the "mood" of that period.

The Apsara nuclear reactor and control room were the most daunting challenge for the art team. The crew looked at a number of reference photographs and videos sent to them by the Films Division located in Mumbai, studying each frame carefully to observe minute details and minimize chances of error, which meant that every piece of gear on the reactor such as the levers and switches had to be present for a purpose and function perfectly. The Thumba equatorial rocket launching station(TERLS) too was reconstructed similarly containing an exact scale replica of the original rocket which weighed over 200 kilograms.

== Episodes ==
=== Season 1 ===
No.	Title	Directed by	Written by	Original release date
1	"War and Peace"	Abhay Pannu	Abhay Pannu, Kausar Munir	4 February 2022
With a difference of opinion related to the ongoing war, Dr. Homi Bhabha and Dr. Vikram Sarabhai look back at the time when they first met each other.
2	"It's Like Gravity"	Abhay Pannu	Abhay Pannu, Kausar Munir	4 February 2022
As Homi and Vikram's friendship grows, an unexpected roadblock leads them to meet a few people who will alter the course of their lives.
3	"The Greater Good"	Abhay Pannu	Abhay Pannu, Kausar Munir	4 February 2022
Homi and Vikram set out on their individual paths in hopes to achieve their dreams.
4	"A Tryst with Destiny"	Abhay Pannu	Abhay Pannu, Kausar Munir	4 February 2022
Emerging as an Independent country, Homi and Vikram share their vision for the country. A new face comes to light while a threat lurks in the shadow.
5	"The Outsider"	Abhay Pannu	Abhay Pannu, Kausar Munir	4 February 2022
Homi and Vikram face a backlash both at personal and professional life.
6	"A Democratic Process"	Abhay Pannu	Abhay Pannu, Kausar Munir	4 February 2022
Their ideas and ambitions are challenged by a fierce rebellion. They must choose a path that they deem fit.
7	"We are at War"	Abhay Pannu	Abhay Pannu, Kausar Munir	4 February 2022
While India gets ready to take its first step in Nuclear science, another dream gets into acceleration, but an impending war threatens to tear it all down.
8	"A New Dawn"	Abhay Pannu	Abhay Pannu, Kausar Munir	4 February 2022
As the country starts to heal the wound from the war, the great men come together for one final showdown to do the impossible.

=== Season 2 ===
No.	Title	Directed by	Written by	Original release date
1	"Lift Off"	Abhay Pannu	Abhay Pannu, Kausar Munir	16 March 2023
Dr. Vikram Sarabhai is getting ready to launch a rocket when he finds out that the entire space programme might be in danger. On the other hand, Dr. Homi J. Bhabha is juggling between his aspirations and threats to his life.
2	"Burden Of Proof"	Abhay Pannu	Abhay Pannu, Kausar Munir	16 March 2023
Vikram's ambition falters prior to taking off. Mrinalini makes a daring move to assert her right as he tries to make progress. Homi's deeds in the meantime drive the enemy to act. Is he prepared to take part in battle despite being invited?
3	"A Lasting Legacy"	Abhay Pannu	Abhay Pannu, Kausar Munir	16 March 2023
As political vultures close ranks, the nation experiences a severe loss and a change in power is organised. Vikram and Homi are compelled to choose a side. Would they continue to put their country before themselves in the face of an uncertain future?
4	"The Price Of War"	Abhay Pannu	Abhay Pannu, Kausar Munir	16 March 2023
While Homi fights for his life in a race against the clock, Indira tries to emerge from her father's enormous shadow. While the nation is under threat of a new war, Vikram and Mrinalini fight on the home front.
5	"Behind Enemy Lines"	Abhay Pannu	Abhay Pannu, Kausar Munir	16 March 2023
Homi disregards caution and engages the adversary head-on as India's nuclear future is on the line. The distance between Vikram and Homi is widening as he mulls over forgiving him.
6	"Power Over Peace"	Abhay Pannu	Abhay Pannu, Kausar Munir	16 March 2023
Vikram assumes a new role that is directly opposed to all he holds dear. He is compelled to face the past and the truths hidden in it even as he has hope for the future.
7	"The Last Guard"	Abhay Pannu	Abhay Pannu, Kausar Munir	16 March 2023
While Homi's plans for the future of the nation's nuclear programme begin to take shape, a wonderful new chapter in India's satellite programme begins. But an unexpected tragedy upsets the balance.
8	"Smiling Buddha"	Abhay Pannu	Abhay Pannu, Kausar Munir	16 March 2023
India and its experts have just eight hours to accomplish an impossibly difficult task in the world's greatest race against time.

== Reception ==
=== Season 1 ===
The show received positive reviews from critics and audience, with praise for the performances, direction, writing and other technical aspects.

The Times of India gave a rating of 3.5 and stated that Jim Sarbh and Ishwak Singh's show is a glowing tribute to India's scientific luminaries. Further, they also said that the show is captivating from the start. Anuj Kumar of The Hindu mentioned that the lead actors Jim Sarbh and Ishwak Singh head a fantastic ensemble cast that gloriously brings to life the achievements of the scientific community in launching India's atomic and space programs. Shefali Deshpande of The Quint gave 4.5/5 stars and said that Rocket Boys is the kind of story that the Oscars and the people at BAFTA look for. In addition to this they also stated that the top-notch acting, storytelling, direction, and music, with actual footage from back in the day and audio to go along with it, this show is here to win slow, steady, and big. Moneycontrol said in their article that Roy Kapur Films, Emmay Entertainment, and SonyLIV together put up a brilliant show that is unmissable. Shubhra Gupta of The Indian Express mentioned Rocket Boys is an absorbing state-of-the-nation saga and both Jim Sarbh and Ishwak Singh are excellent. Hindustan Times expressed Rocket Boys as one of the web series with the most well-crafted, earnestly performed, and tightly written scenes. Moreover, it also said that the show is a shining star on the streamer's roster. The Scroll.in wrote that Rocket Boys is fuelled by vaulting ambition on the screen and beyond, and it's a heady mix of research and creative liberty, pop quiz-level trivia, and a flair for drama. NDTV Gadgets 360 said that Abhay Pannu's Rocket Boys delivers in spades with the story of Homi Bhabha and Vikram Sarabhai and mentioned India comes of age in SonyLIV's terrific new series. NDTV gave a 3.5 rating to Rocket Boys and further said that The series gets the science of blending fact and fiction absolutely right and delivers a viewing experience that is a marked remove from generic shows. ThePrint featured Rocket Boys as a unique blend of science and the everyday, personal and political, fact and fiction, that makes science less elite, more accessible, more awe-inspiring while being grounded. Priya Hazra of ScoopWhoop said praised the show by saying that it is an on-point casting & brilliant storytelling that makes 'Rocket Boys' a biopic Bollywood could learn from. It further added that witnessing the historic event unfold, even on the screen, was an overwhelming and proud moment, and given the earnestness with which it was played out made it even better. Pinkvilla gave 4/5 stars and stated that Jim Sarbh and Ishwak Singh fabulously bolster India's empirical history. It also mentioned that Rocket Boys treads a measured pace and gradually develops a story and its characters to make the bigger picture more interesting and entertaining. While the writing, casting, and acting are on point, the show also scores big on its background music and production music. Outlook gave a rating of 4 and said that Jim Sarbh, Ishwak Singh shines in this humanized tale of India's greatest scientists and makes it a wonderful biopic drama that never stops inspiring. Arré's thoughts on Rocket Boys were that the series did a good job of visualizing and explaining technical details to a layperson in a cinematic way. In addition to this, it also said that "Rocket Boys" is an important watch to reflect on the dreams of India's OG scientific pioneers and hopefully inspire young minds. Rediff gave a rating of 4 and stated that Rocket Boys is a soaring tribute to the two pillars of India's science world.

Shekhar Gupta of The Print criticized in his article titled 'Rocket Boys’ crime on history: Inventing Muslim villain, stealing Meghnad Saha's identity' saying "That he [Meghnad Saha] was from a lower caste, and has mostly been forgotten in our popular memory since (on his centenary in 1993, the Narasimha Rao government issued a postage stamp), probably made it more convenient to bury his character in what pretends to be a “true” history and give him a mostly evil, dark, Muslim avatar. In our book, this is a crime on not just history but on all the ideals so dear to people like Saha, Bhabha and Sarabhai. Remember, those incredible scientists were freedom fighters too."

Amrita Shah, author of Vikram Sarabhai – A Life criticised the series for distorting history with fictionalized events, puerile depiction of India's technological programmes in space and nuclear energy and egregious misrepresentation of Sarabhai's character that diminishes his significance and lacks depth without any nuance. Journalist Gita Aravamudan (wife of Ramabhadran Aravamudan and co-author of ISRO: A Personal History) found the series reducing iconic Indian scientists into Bollywood stereotypes, falsifying major events and dates and concocting a fake version of A. P. J. Abdul Kalam that suits the script. She adds that real story of Indian nuclear and space programs is far more richer than fictionalized screen version which ignores scientific and technical aspects of their journey.

=== Season 2 ===
The second season of Rocket Boys received positive reviews from critics as well as the audience.

Archika Khurana of The Times of India called the series a ‘Factual and thrilling drama about Indian scientists.’ Sanyukta Thakare from Mashable said that the series ‘Remains true to its heroes.’ India Today’s Roktim Rajpal called the second season an ‘engaging narrative.’ Dainik Jagran stated the second season is a ‘beautiful portrayal of ambitions.’ The Quint praised the lead actors, saying, ‘Jim and Ishwak confidently carry Homi and Vikram on their shoulders, making us root for their friendship even as they don't see eye to eye on many things.’

Firstpost mentioned that the new season is denser and more conflicted this time.’ The Print called it a ‘heady mix of fact and fiction.’ The New Indian Express noted that the series is ‘A love letter to India and its men of science.’

India Forums said, ‘With impeccable performances, fine writing, and crackling music, this season also cannot be missed out on.’ Peeping Moon said, ‘Rocket Boys is hailed as one of the best shows to come out of India and it retains the title with sheer honesty.’ Movie Talkies stated, ‘Every episode ends on an exciting note, which leaves you curious to know what happens next.’

Koimoi’s Shubham Kulkarni stated that the series is ‘more about politics and personal battles than just accolades where the horizon broadens to serve yet another spectacle.’ Pooja Darade from Leisure Byte said that the second season is ‘emotional and thrilling at the same time.’

=== Public Reception ===
Rocket Boys received commercial acclaim for its compelling storytelling, impeccable performances and the writing. While the internet was flooded with audiences appreciating Rocket Boys, the series was also among the Top 5 most-liked Hindi shows on the Ormax Power Rating (OPR) 2022. In the same year, Rocket Boys made it to the Top 5 on IMDb's Most Popular Web Series list. Praises were received from actors Hrithik Roshan, and Arjun Kapoor. Amul India used its mascot in honor of the show. In 2022, the show garnered over 30 award wins in prominent categories like Best Actor, Best Actress, Best Director and Best Series, among various others in the Filmfare OTT Awards 2022, Indian Telly Streaming Awards 2022 amongst others.

Following the release of Rocket Boys 2 on 16 March 2023, the show received an 8.9 rating on IMDb.

== Promotion ==
For season 1, Sony LIV ran an innovative jacket advertisement on India's leading daily, The Times Of India, by taking its readers back to the original headlines covering the day of India's first rocket launch. The advertisement featured a landmark page, taken from the archives.

For season 2, the Sony LIV team used another innovative jacket advertisement on India's leading daily, The Times Of India. The advertisement recreated headlines covering the success of the nuclear test in 1974 and highlighted the milestones leading up to the success of the test. Additionally to promote Season 2, Sony LIV partnered with popular delivery platforms such as Swiggy India and Zepto to reach a wider audience.

== Soundtrack ==
The theme, soundtrack and the score of both the seasons was composed by Achint Thakkar. The score has as interesting mix of orchestral music infused with Indian melodies.

== Awards and nominations ==
Year	Awards	Winner	Category	Ref
2022	Filmfare OTT Awards 2022	Abhay Pannu	Best Director, Series	
2022	Filmfare OTT Awards 2022		Best Series	
2022	Filmfare OTT Awards 2022	Jim Sarbh	Best Actor, Critics Drama	
2022	Filmfare OTT Awards 2022	Harshveer Oberai	Best Cinematographer, Series	
2022	Filmfare OTT Awards 2022	Abhay Pannu	Best Original Screenplay, Series	
2022	Filmfare OTT Awards 2022	Meghna Gandhi	Best Production Design, Series	
2022	Filmfare OTT Awards 2022	Biju & Uma	Best Costume Design, Series	
2022	Filmfare OTT Awards 2022	Variate Studio	Best VFX, Series	
2022	Indian Telly Streaming Awards 2022		Best Story	
2022	Indian Telly Streaming Awards 2022		Best Series - Hindi	
2022	Indian Telly Streaming Awards 2022	Jim Sarbh	Best Actor - Hindi Series	
2022	Indian Telly Streaming Awards 2022	Harshvir Oberai	Best D.O.P - Hindi Series	
2022	Indian Television Academy Awards 2022 (ITA)	Abhay Pannu	Best Director	
2022	Indian Television Academy Awards 2022 (ITA)		Best Web Series	
2022	Indian Television Academy Awards 2022 (ITA)	Abhay Pannu, Abhay Korane	Best Story	
2022	Indian Television Academy Awards 2022 (ITA)	Jim Sarbh	Best Actor Web Series	
2022	Indian Television Academy Awards 2022 (ITA)	Maahir Zaveri	Best Editor	
2022	Indian Television Academy Awards 2022 (ITA)	Variate Studio	Best VFX	
2022	SPOTT Awards 2022		Drama Show on Web	
2022	SPOTT Awards 2022		Web Series - Hindi Fiction Show	
2022	SPOTT Awards 2022	Abhay Pannu	Director of the year	
2022	SPOTT Awards 2022	Maahir Zaveri	Editor of the year	
2022	SPOTT Awards 2022	Jim Sarbh	Performance in a leading role ( Male)	
2022	SPOTT Awards 2022	Regina Cassandra	Performance in a leading role ( Female)	
2022	SPOTT Awards 2022	Saba Azad	Performance in a supporting role ( Female)	
2022	SPOTT Awards 2022	Harshvir Oberai	Cinematographer of the year	
2022	Yellowstone International Film Festival Awards 2022 (YIFF)	Jim Sarbh	Outstanding Performances in a show (Male)	
2022	Yellowstone International Film Festival Awards 2022 (YIFF)	Ishwak Singh	Outstanding Performances in a show (Male)	
2022	Promax Asia 2022		Best Drama Promo (Gold)	
2022	Promax Asia 2022		Best Launch Campaign (Silver)	
2022	Digital ReInvent 2022		Best Trailer Programme - (Gold)	
2023	Hitlist OTT Awards Season 4	Ishwak Singh	Best Actor - Male	
2023	Critics Choice Awards		Best Web Series	
2023	Critics Choice Awards	Jim Sarbh	Best Actor	
2023	Critics Choice Awards	Abhay Pannu, Kausar Munir	Best Writing	
