= Industry (miniseries) =

- Promotional poster
- Genre: Drama
- Created by: Navjot Gulati; Shreyansh Pandey
- Directed by: Navjot Gulati
- Starring: Gagan Arora; Ankita Goraya; Asha Negi; Lakshya Kochhar; Chunky Pandey
- Country of origin: India
- Original language: Hindi
- No. of seasons: 1
- No. of episodes: 5

Production
- Producer: Arunabh Kumar
- Production company: The Viral Fever

Original release
- Network: Amazon miniTV
- Release: June 19, 2024

Industry is a 2024 Indian Hindi-language drama miniseries created by Navjot Gulati and Shreyansh Pandey. Produced by The Viral Fever, the series stars Gagan Arora, Ankita Goraya, Asha Negi, Lakshya Kochhar, and Chunky Pandey. It premiered on Amazon miniTV on 19 June 2024.

== Plot summary ==
The series centres on Aayush Verma, an aspiring screenwriter who moves to Mumbai to pursue a career in the Hindi film industry. He attempts to have his script, ''Dhoom Dhadaka'', produced while facing multiple rejections. The storyline depicts his professional efforts alongside his personal relationships, illustrating the challenges faced by newcomers seeking to establish themselves in Bollywood.

== Cast and characters ==
- Gagan Arora as Ayush Verma
- Ankita Goraya as Gayatri Shah
- Asha Negi as Sanya Sen
- Lakshya Kochhar as Rocky Wadhwani
- Chunky Pandey as Rakesh Raman
- Jitendra Singh Rajput as Romil Jha
- Siddharth Mishra as Rupesh Sinha
- Satchit Puranik as K
- Rajendra Sethi as Jaggi
- Samarth Shandilya as Arjun Shandilya
- Ajay Sharma as Jayesh
- Amitesh Raj as Chotu Rocky's Pa
- Prithvi Hatte as Ira Bajaj

== Release ==
The series premiered on Amazon miniTV on 19 June 2024, with five episodes.

== Reception ==
Industry received mixed reviews from critics. Archika Khurana of The Times of India rated the series 2.5/5, noting "Despite some flaws, ‘Industry’ offers an authentic glimpse into the intricacies of showbiz duniya through the eyes of an aspiring screenwriter, making it a one-time watch. Sadly, this show about the writers lacks support from their core writing department."

Soumyabrata Gupta of Times Now rated it 3 out of 5 and commended "the show’s unique perspective on the lives of aspiring Bollywood artists, but felt it did not fully capitalise on its premise due to uneven pacing and narrative inconsistencies." Devansh Sharma of Hindustan Times wrote "Navjot Gulati's show on the Bollywood dream is raw, familiar yet rooted, lived-in."

Yemen of The Lallantop rated it 2.5 out of 5 and wrote "The only complaint is that it could have been much better. The writing of the show is to blame for this. At one point, the stories of the characters become too long. There are many such scenes which are not working to take the story forward." Swetha+Ramakrishnan of OTTPlay rated 3/5 and wrote "Ambitious and heart-warming, Industry is steeped in Hindi film industry references, with a romanticisation of the struggle of “making it big."
