= The Waking of a Nation =

Indian 2025 web series by Ram Madhvani

- The Waking of a Nation Poster
- Genre: History; Thriller
- Screenplay by: Shantanu Srivastava; Shatrujeet Nath; Ram Madhvani
- Directed by: Ram Madhvani
- Starring: Taaruk Raina; Sahil Mehta; Bhawsheel Singh Sahni; Nikita Dutta
- Music by: Sameer Uddin
- Country of origin: India
- Original languages: Hindi; English
- No. of episodes: 6

Production
- Executive producers: Udayan Baijal; Ankita Batra
- Producers: Amita Madhvani; Ram Madhvani
- Cinematography: Kavya Sharma; Dhawalika Singh
- Editors: Abhimanyu Chaudhary; Amit Karia
- Production company: Ram Madhvani Films

Original release
- Network: SonyLIV
- Release: 7 March 2025

The Waking of a Nation is a 2025 Indian Hindi-language historical drama web series streaming on SonyLIV based on the events leading to the Jallianwala Bagh massacre in 1919. It was directed by Ram Madhvani and produced by Amita Madhvani and Ram Madhvani, under banner of Ram Madhvani Films.

It starred Taaruk Raina, Sahil Mehta, Bhawsheel Singh Sahni and Nikita Dutta in main roles. The series was released on SonyLIV on 7 March 2025. Various critics rated the show with 2 to 3 stars out of 5.

== Plot ==
On 13 April 1919, a British army officer, Brigadier-General Reginald Dyer, ordered his troops to shoot at a crowd of unarmed and peaceful Indians that had assembled at Jallianwala Bagh in Amritsar to protest against the Rowlatt Act. The firing lasted for roughly five minutes, during which 1,650 rounds were fired. The number of casualties is still debated, but the British Government later accepted that nearly 400 Indians had been killed in the shooting.

A textbook example of the tyranny of the British Raj, the Amritsar Massacre – later known as the Jallianwala Bagh Massacre – became a watershed moment in India’s freedom movement, galvanizing the entire nation to rise against its colonial master and setting India’s struggle for independence in motion.

The massacre at Jallianwala Bagh caused such public outrage that the British Government was compelled to set up the Disorders Inquiry Committee to investigate the incident. The findings of the inquiry divided the Commission along racial lines, with its British members refusing to view the massacre as a symptom of systemic racialism, while its Indian members insisted that race relations and white supremacy lay at the core of the violence. The Hunter Commission’s report singularly blamed Brigadier-General Dyer for the massacre, and as a consequence, the general was stripped of his rank and asked to resign.

What circumstances led General Dyer to march into Jallianwala Bagh on 13 April 1919 and open fire on the gathering? How were the disturbances that had taken place in Amritsar on 10 April, three days earlier, connected to the events of the massacre? What role did the arrest and deportation of Dr. Satyapal and Dr. Kitchlew, two prominent and respected Gandhian leaders in Amritsar, play in the unfolding situation? Furthermore, what part did Punjab’s Lieutenant-Governor, Michael O’Dwyer, play in the events leading up to and following the massacre?

Most importantly, was Brigadier-General Dyer singularly responsible for the massacre, or was he acting on specific orders?

Waking of a Nation: Jallianwala Bagh is a web series that explores the frictions and triggers behind the Jallianwala Bagh massacre through the eyes of Kantilal Sahni, a fictitious member of the Hunter Commission. Putting the events surrounding the massacre under a microscope, the series uncovers a deep conspiracy rooted in the colonial notion of white superiority. The show reimagines history based on the Hunter Commission’s inquiry, and deals with issues like racism, prejudice, whitewashing, half-truths and the redaction of history. Waking of a Nation: Jallianwala Bagh also looks at how India became India.

== Cast ==
- Taaruk Raina as lawyer Kantilal Sahni
- Sahil Mehta as Ali Allahbaksh
- Bhawsheel Singh Sahni as Hari Singh Aulakh
- Nikita Dutta as Poonam Aulakh
- Paul McEwan as Michael O’Dwyer
- Jamie Alter as Colonel Morgan
- Carl Wharton as Lord William Hunter
- Raymond Bethley as Commissioner Kitchin
- Alex Reece as General Dyer
- Tómas Howser as Deputy Commissioner Miles Irving
- Ant Wright as Plomer
- Matt Metcalfe
- Mark Brailsford
- Ikhlaque Khan
- Adhyay Bakshi
- Rita Sigmond
- Leda Hodgson
- Robbie Boyle
- Jake James Harrison
- Baljinder Singh Darapuri

== Release and reception ==
The Waking of a Nation premiered on 7 March 2025, on OTT Platform SonyLIV.

Hardika Gupta of NDTV gave 2 stars out of 5 and said that "Unlike other portrayals of this historical event - such as Sardar Udham or Rang De Basanti - director Ram Madhvani does not dwell on the bloodshed itself." Deepa Gahlot of Rediff.com gave 2.5 stars and writes that "Ram Madhvani's series is all over the place and also boring to watch". Rahul Desai The Hollywood Reporter India said that "Ram Madhvani period drama lacks the technical finesse to explore the Jallianwala Bagh massacre." Alaka Sahani of The Indian Express rated 2/5 stars and said "The Ram Madhvani-directed middling historical drama based on the events leading to Jallianwala Bagh massacre is too verbose and lacks dramatic tension". Nandini Ramnath of scroll.in said about the weries that "In its effort to slap viewers out of their perceived stupor, The Waking of a Nation does itself a huge disservice. The desired impact could have been achieved without jumbling the timeline or working overtime to prove a conspiracy that isn’t exactly one – history rather than hysteria."

Sana Farzeen of India Today gave 3 stars out of 5 and writes in her review that " For history buffs, the six-episode show is going to be a decent weekend watch. But if you’re expecting a stirring dose of patriotism or an emotionally gripping tale, you may walk away disappointed." Devesh Sharma of Filmfare rated 2.5/5 stars and said that "It takes us to the aftermath of the Jallianwala Bagh massacre but sluggish pace and inconsistent writing mar the impact". Aishwarya Vasudevan of OTT Play gave 2.5 stars out of 5 and observed that "The Waking of a Nation explores the Jallianwala Bagh Massacre through a courtroom drama but falters with repetitive flashbacks. Taaruk Raina shines, yet the series struggles to stay engaging." Abhinav Singh of Mashable India said "The Waking of a Nation is a show that’s skippable only because it spends more time pandering to emotions rather than hooking the viewers." Archika Khurana of The Times of India gave 2.5 stars out of 5 and writes that "The Waking of a Nation is an ambitious but inconsistent historical drama that struggles to balance its engaging premise with effective storytelling."
