= College Romance =

Indian web series

- Genre: Drama; Comedy
- Written by: Kunal Aneja; Abhishek Srivastava; Akash Ahuja; Sidhant Mago; Manan Madaan; Pankaj Mavchi; Ashutosh Chaturvedi
- Directed by: Simarpreet Singh; Apoorv Singh Karki; Parijat Josh
- Starring: Keshav Sadhna; Apoorva Arora; Manjot Singh; Gagan Arora; Shreya Mehta
- Country of origin: India
- Original language: Hindi
- No. of seasons: 4
- No. of episodes: 20

Production
- Executive producers: Arun Kumar; Vijay Koshy; Shreyansh Pandey
- Producer: Arunabh Kumar
- Production company: The Viral Fever Media Labs

Original release
- Network: TVFPlay, YouTube (season 1); SonyLIV (seasons 2-4)
- Release: 7 August 2018 – 14 July 2023

College Romance is an Indian Hindi-language web series created by The Viral Fever and developed by Arunabh Kumar. It stars Keshav Sadhna, Apoorva Arora, Manjot Singh, Gagan Arora and Shreya Mehta. It follows three best friends Karan, Naira, and Trippy's look for love, laughs, and some lifelong memories while attending college together.

College Romance Season 1 directed by Simarpreet Singh, premiered simultaneously on the company's media streaming platform TVF Play and in YouTube, on 7 August 2018 and it received a positive response from the audience. Following the success of the first season, the makers renewed for a second season directed by Apoorv Singh Karki, that aired through Sony LIV on 29 January 2021.

The third season directed by Parijat Joshi released on Sony LIV on 16 September 2022. The 4th and final season of the series released on 14 July 2023

== Cast ==
Character	Portrayed by	Description	Appearances			
Character	Portrayed by	Description	Season 1	Season 2	Season 3	Season 4
Karan	Keshav Sadhna	Deepika's ex-boyfriend, Naira and Trippy's best friend, Dhatrapriya's boyfriend	Main	Main	Main	Main
Naira	Apoorva Arora	Bagga's girlfriend, Karan, and Trippy's best friend	Main	Main	Main	Main
Trippy	Manjot Singh	Raveena's ex-boyfriend, Karan, and Naira's best friend	Main	Main		Guest
Bagga	Gagan Arora	Naira's boyfriend	Main	Main	Main	Main
Deepika	Shreya Mehta	Karan's ex-girlfriend	Main	Main	Main	Main
Raveena Patel	Hira Ashar	Trippy's ex-girlfriend	Main			
Dhatrapriya	Nupur Nagpal	Karan's girlfriend		Recurring	Main	Main
Harry	Eklavey Kashyap	Karan and Bagga's roommate			Main	Main
Rawi	Jahnvi Rawat	Bagga's sister			Main	Main
Anshuman	Ambrish Verma	Raveena's ex-boyfriend	Recurring			
Naina	Geetika Budhiraja	—	Recurring	Recurring		
Birju	Ankit Motghare	—	Recurring			
—	Sahil Verma	Bagga's friend	Recurring	Recurring		Recurring
Anika	Shreya Singh	—	Recurring			
Munjal Sir	Shiva Kumar	Karan, Naira, and Trippy's teacher	Recurring	Recurring		Recurring
Karishma	Samriddhi Mehra	—		Recurring		
Raveena Mishra	Surabhi Mehra	Trippy's second girlfriend		Recurring		Guest
Bhati	Ankur Pathak	Bagga's enemy turned accomplice		Recurring	Recurring	Guest
Kabir	Darius Chinoy	College Guidance Counsellor		Recurring		
Pauranik Katha	Shivankit Singh Parihar	—		Recurring		
Hippy	Aishwarya Chaudhary	—		Recurring		
Manager	Lucky Gupta	Bagga's friend		Recurring		

== Series overview ==
Season	No. of episodes	Originally broadcast (India)	
Season	No. of episodes	First aired	Last aired
1	5	7 August 2018	7 September 2018
2	5	29 January 2021	
3	5	16 September 2022	
4	5	14 July 2023	

== Accolades ==
Year	Award	Category	Recipient	Result	Ref.
2021	Filmfare OTT Awards	Best Comedy Series	Arunabh Kumar	Nominated	
