= Son of Sardaar 2 =

2025 Indian film by Vijay Kumar Arora

- Theatrical release poster
- Directed by: Vijay Kumar Arora
- Written by: Jagdeep Singh Sidhu; Mohit Jain
- Based on: Aile Arasında by Ozan Açıktan
- Produced by: Ajay Devgn; Jyoti Deshpande; N.R. Pachisia; Pravin Talreja
- Starring: Ajay Devgn; Mrunal Thakur; Ravi Kishan; Neeru Bajwa; Sanjay Mishra; Deepak Dobriyal; Sahil Mehta
- Cinematography: Aseem Bajaj
- Edited by: Ninad Khanolkar
- Music by: Songs: Jaani; Tanishk Bagchi; Harsh Upadhyay; Lijo George - DJ Chetas; Tejwant Kittu; Jay Mavani; Sunny Vik; Score: Amar Mohile; Salil Amrute
- Production companies: Jio Studios; Devgn Films; YRV Studios
- Distributed by: PVR Inox Pictures
- Release date: 1 August 2025
- Running time: 147 minutes
- Country: India
- Language: Hindi
- Budget: ₹150 crore
- Box office: est. ₹60.90 crore

Son of Sardaar 2 is a 2025 Indian Hindi-language comedy film directed by Vijay Kumar Arora and jointly produced by Ajay Devgn, Jyoti Deshpande, N.R. Pachisia and Pravin Talreja. A standalone sequel to the 2012 film Son of Sardaar and a remake of the 2017 Turkish comedy Aile Arasında, it stars Devgn, Mrunal Thakur, Ravi Kishan, Sanjay Mishra and Sahil Mehta, with Mukul Dev posthumously making his final film appearance. In the film, a man fakes being a war hero to assist a couple in gaining their parents' approval for their marriage.

Principal photography began in July 2024 and took place in Edinburgh, London, and Chandigarh, India. Initially scheduled to release on 25 July 2025, the film was released on 1 August 2025. It received mixed to negative reviews from critics. The film was a box office disaster.

== Plot ==
Jassi Singh Randhawa, a cheerful and well-meaning man, has spent over a decade in India awaiting a visa to join his wife, Dimple in Scotland. When he finally receives the visa, he arrives in the UK, only to be met with the shocking news that Dimple wants a divorce. Heartbroken but determined, Jassi decides to stay and mend their relationship with the help of Rabia.

However, things take an unexpected turn when Jassi becomes entangled in a complex situation involving a young woman named Saba, who is in love with Goggi, the son of the influential and patriotic businessman-turned-gangster Raja Sandhu. Raja is adamant about his son marrying into a respectable family and is opposed to Saba's relationship due to her background.

To help Saba, Jassi and Rabia concoct a plan where Jassi pretends to be a retired war hero and Rabia poses as his Indian wife. Their goal is to impress Raja and gain his approval for Saba and Goggi's marriage. This leads to a series of comedic and chaotic events, as Jassi and Rabia navigate the challenges of maintaining their ruse while dealing with the suspicions of Raja's brothers, Titu and Tony, who are determined to expose Jassi's deception.

As the story unfolds, Jassi and Rabia's relationship evolves, and they are forced to confront their past and present feelings for each other.

During the wedding, Saba's real father, who had duped the group, returns and sees his daughter getting married. Meanwhile, Dimple also returns to apologise to Jassi, revealing that her boyfriend was only after her property and she broke up with him. As Jassi and Rabia unsuccessfully try to cover up the matter by saying that they were involved in extra-marital long-distance affairs with Dimple and Danish respectively, Bantu Pandey, who is revealed to be Goggi's biological father shows up. Raja confronts Premlata and she reveals that Goggi was born out of wedlock and instead, she was forced to marry Raja due to family pressure. Raja eventually accepts Saba. As the celebrations are about to resume, a chandelier falls on top of Dimple, instantly killing her. A heartbroken Jassi walks out of the wedding.

A few days later, Jassi shows up to Rabia's home and proposes. She agrees and they reconcile.

== Cast ==
- Ajay Devgn as Jaswinder "Jassi" Singh Randhawa – Dimple's ex-husband; Rabia's love interest
- Mrunal Thakur as Rabia Akhtar – Zeenat's sister; Danish's ex-wife; Saba's adoptive mother and aunt; Jassi's love interest
- Ravi Kishan as Raja – Ranjit Singh's son; Premlata's husband; Goggi's stepfather; Tony and Tittu's half brother
- Neeru Bajwa as Dimple – Jassi's ex-wife; Robin's girlfriend
- Deepak Dobriyal as Gul – Rabia's friend and roommate
- Kubbra Sait as Mehwish – Rabia's friend and roommate
- Chunky Panday as Danish – Zeenat's widower; Rabia's ex-husband; Saba's father
- Sharat Saxena as Ranjit Singh – Raja, Tony and Titu's father
- Mukul Dev as Tony – Ranjit Singh's son; Raja's half brother; Tittu's brother
- Vindu Dara Singh as Tittu – Ranjit Singh's son; Raja's half brother; Tony's brother
- Roshni Walia as Saba / Simran – Danish and Zeenat's daughter; Rabia's adoptive daughter and niece; Goggi's wife
- Sanjay Mishra as Bantu Pandey – Goggi's biological father
- Ashwini Kalsekar as Premlata – Raja's wife and Goggi's mother
- Sahil Mehta as Goggi – Premlata and Raja's son; Saba's husband
- Dolly Ahluwalia as Bebe – Jassi's mother
- Nalneesh Neel as Keshav
- Shrikant Verma as Tyagi
- Guru Randhawa as himself in "The Po Po Song" (special appearance)
- Rohit Shetty as himself (cameo appearance)

== Production ==
=== Casting ===
Ajay Devgn reprises his role from the prequel. Mrunal Thakur was chosen as the female lead. Sanjay Dutt was initially meant to reprise his role, however he was unable to join the UK schedule due to his visa being rejected by the UK. He was replaced by Ravi Kishan. Vijay Raaz was signed but was later dropped from the project.

=== Filming ===
Principal photography began in Edinburgh in July 2024 with a filming schedule taking place across 50 days. Filming later took place in the UK in London and at the Firth of Forth. Filming also took place in Punjab, India. In April 2025, Kubbra Sait completed her dubbing.

== Soundtrack ==
Son of Sardaar 2

Soundtrack album by Jaani, Tanishk Bagchi, Harsh Upadhyay, Lijo George - DJ Chetas, Tejwant Kittu, Jay Mavani and Sunny Vik
- Released: 18 July 2025
- Recorded: 2024–2025
- Genre: Feature film soundtrack
- Length: 22:58
- Language: Hindi
- Label: T-Series
External audio
- Son of Sardaar 2 - Full Album on YouTube

The songs of the film are composed by Jaani, Tanishk Bagchi, Harsh Upadhyay, Lijo George - DJ Chetas, Tejwant Kittu, Jay Mavani and Sunny Vik while the background score is composed by Amar Mohile and Salil Amrute. The first single titled "Son of Sardaar 2 (Title Track)" was released on 1 July 2025. The second single titled "Pehla Tu Duja Tu" was released on 7 July 2025. The third single titled "Nachdi" was released on 14 July 2025. The fourth single titled "The Po Po Song" was released on 17 July 2025. The fifth single titled "Nazar Battu" was released on 24 July 2025.

The songs "Son of Sardaar 2 - Title Track," "The Po Po Song" from the 2012 film Son of Sardaar was recreated for the film.

Track listing
No.	Title	Lyrics	Music	Singer(s)	Length
1.	"Pehla Tu Duja Tu"	Jaani	Jaani	Vishal Mishra	3:51
2.	"Son of Sardaar 2 (Title Track)"	Shabbir Ahmed, Khara, Sukriti Bhardwaj	Harsh Upadhyay	Romy, Sudhir Yaduvanshi, Sukriti Bhardwaj	3:45
3.	"The Po Po Song"	Armaan Sharma	Tanishk Bagchi	Guru Randhawa	2:43
4.	"Nazar Battu"	Pranav Vatsa	Harsh Upadhyay, Jay Mavani	Jubin Nautiyal	3:33
5.	"Kali Ainak"	Kumaar	Lijo George - DJ Chetas	Romy, Lijo George	3:15
6.	"Rabba Sanu"	Khara	Sunny Vik	Vikas Maan	3:14
7.	"Nachdi"	Albel Brar	Tejwant Kittu	Neha Kakkar	2:37
Total length:					22:58

== Release ==
=== Theatrical ===
The film was originally scheduled to release on 25 July 2025, however it was postponed to 1 August 2025.

=== Home media ===
The film began streaming on Netflix from 26 September 2025.

== Reception ==
=== Box office ===
The film has grossed ₹60.9 crore (US$6.3 million) at box office.

=== Critical response ===
Son of Sardaar 2 received mixed reviews from critics. On the review aggregator website Rotten Tomatoes, 15% of 13 critics' reviews are positive, with an average rating of 4/10. Lipika Verma of Deccan Chronicle gave it a 3.5/5 rating praising it as a perfect family film- A story with fresh comedy, action and emotions, with the ingredients matching, while also praising the cast, music, cinematography and direction. Dhaval Roy from The Times of India gave the film 3 stars out of 5, noting the film delivered hilarity regularly, while finding the plot tangled and overstuffed with characters and comic tracks, the song-and-dance sequences further dragging on without advancing the plot, and the climax convoluted, predictable, and over‑dramatised. Rishabh Suri from Hindustan Times also gave the film 3 stars out of 5, praising the performances and calling it a light-hearted comedy with a simple screenplay and engaging characters.

Nishad Thaivalappil from CNN-News18 awarded a similar rating of 3 stars out of 5, praising the performances while feeling the film lacked good humour. Devesh Sharma from Filmfare gave it 3/5 stars saying it is fun and games - a loud, loony, live-action cartoon which gleefully chucks logic out of the window and asks you bring along your funny bone. Piya Roy of The Telegraph wrote that Son of Sardaar 2 starts out in the first half as genuinely funny and keeps the viewer's interest high, but felt that some elements in the second half added unnecessary baggage to it, while also mentioning that the complex issue of Indo-Pakistan dynamics is handled in the film in a "humorous and clever way". Anuj Kumar from The Hindu wrote that this film is a stereotypical Punjabi entertainer, a goofy comedy with strong performances (in particular Deepak Dobriyal and Ravi Kishen) and jokes that land, but also said that there are passages which make you cringe.

Vineeta Kumar from India Today gave the film 2.5 stars out of 5, remarking that while the film mixed India–Pakistan banter and awkward romance, it lacked the original's charm, and Devgn and Mrunal Thakur's chemistry felt forced and unconvincing. Bollywood Hungama gave the film 2 stars out of 5, finding the story promising and praising the background score, cinematography and production design, while feeling the music was not up to the mark and the humour was limited. Shubhra Gupta from The Indian Express also gave the film 2 stars out of 5, praising Dobriyal's portrayal of a trans character, while feeling the film wanted to be a laugh-a-minute, madcap caper, but kept slackening.

Saibal Chatterjee from NDTV gave the film 1.5 stars out of 5, labelling it a comedy in which neither the whole nor the sum of its parts added up to much, while finding Kishan sporadically funny and praising the cinematography. Lachmi Deb Roy of Firstpost similarly gave the film 1.5 stars out of 5 and praised the performances of Kishan and Dobriyal, while finding the storyline bogus and the film poorly executed. Shreyas Pande from Cinema Express gave the film 1 star out of 5, remarking that while it was promoted as a family entertainer, parents will uncomfortably squirm on their seats watching the film continuously make bottom line derogatory jokes. Rahul Desai from The Hollywood Reporter India found the film more progressive and less performative than a majority of mainstream Hindi cinema, while also feeling the film blurred the lines between unintentional and intentional humour.
