= Raksha Bandhan (film) =

2022 Indian film by Aanand L. Rai

- Theatrical release poster
- Directed by: Aanand L. Rai
- Written by: Himanshu Sharma; Kanika Dhillon
- Produced by: Alka Hiranandani; Aanand L. Rai; Himanshu Sharma
- Starring: Akshay Kumar; Bhumi Pednekar; Sadia Khateeb; Sahil Mehta; Sahejmeen Kaur; Smrithi Srikanth; Deepika Khanna
- Narrated by: Sadia Khateeb
- Cinematography: K. U. Mohanan; Anshuman Mahaley
- Edited by: Abhijeet Parekh
- Music by: Score: Ishaan Chhabra; Songs: Himesh Reshammiya
- Production companies: Cape of Good Films; Colour Yellow Productions
- Distributed by: Zee Studios
- Release date: 11 August 2022
- Running time: 108 minutes
- Country: India
- Language: Hindi
- Budget: ₹70 crore
- Box office: est. ₹61.61 crore

Raksha Bandhan (lit. 'Raksha Bandhan'; transl. The bond of protection) is a 2022 Indian Hindi-language family comedy-drama film directed by Aanand L. Rai and written by Himanshu Sharma and Kanika Dhillon. A remake of the 2005 Bengali film Dadar Adesh, the film stars Akshay Kumar, Bhumi Pednekar, Sadia Khateeb, Sahil Mehta, Sahejmeen Kaur, Smrithi Srikanth and Deepika Khanna.

The film was theatrically released on 11 August 2022, coinciding with Raksha Bandhan and Independence Day. It received mixed-to-positive reviews from critics, but emerged as a box office failure.

== Plot ==
In Old Delhi, Lala Kedarnath, the eldest and only brother of four sisters—Gayatri, Durga, Laxmi, and Saraswati—runs a chaat shop, Premlata Chat Bhandar, founded by his grandfather. He manages it with his loyal helper, Gaffar. On his frail mother's deathbed, Lala promises that he will marry only after settling his sisters into suitable homes. His attempts to arrange their marriages are repeatedly frustrated by social prejudice: Laxmi's dark complexion, Durga's weight, and Saraswati's masculine behaviour make it difficult to find suitable grooms. His devotion to his sisters also prevents him from marrying his childhood love, Sapna.

Understanding Lala's commitment, Sapna agrees to wait, but her father, Harishankar, continually pressures her to marry. Lala eventually raises ₹18 lakh (US$19,000) for Gayatri's dowry, enabling her marriage. It is then revealed that Lala is not the sisters' biological brother: their mother adopted him after his own mother died near a temple. To fund Durga and Laxmi's marriages, Lala sells one of his kidneys. However, Gayatri's husband and in-laws demand additional dowry. Unwilling to burden Lala further, Gayatri keeps this from him and ultimately commits suicide by drinking poison. Realising the devastating consequences of the dowry system, Lala vows to make his remaining sisters self-sufficient so that they can choose their own husbands and marry without dowry.

Lala ends his relationship with Sapna and asks her to marry the man chosen by her father. On Sapna's wedding day, however, Harishankar recognises that she still loves Lala and asks her to call off the marriage. Sapna breaks off the alliance and decides to wait for Lala. Her former fiancé, Swapnil, later falls in love with Laxmi and marries her 12 years later.

Durga completes her graduation and becomes an advocate. She eventually has Gayatri's husband imprisoned on dowry charges before marrying one of her classmates. Saraswati becomes a police officer and marries her colleague. Having fulfilled his mother's wish and ensured that all four sisters are settled, Lala finally marries Sapna at the age of 60.

== Cast ==
- Akshay Kumar as Lala Kedarnath Agarwal
- Bhumi Pednekar as Sapna Gupta
- Sadia Khateeb as Gayatri Agarwal–Mishra
- Deepika Khanna as Durga Agarwal
- Smrithi Srikanth as Laxmi Agarwal–Verma
- Sahejmeen Kaur as Saraswati Agarwal
- Seema Pahwa as Shanoo Sharma
- Neeraj Sood as Harishankar Gupta
- Sahil Mehta as Gaffar
- Abhilash Thapliyal as Swapnil Verma
- Manu Rishi as Maternal Uncle
- Karan Puri as Sunil Mishra
- Salim Siddiqui as Neelu's Husband
- Bullet Prakash as Siddiqui (Uncredited)

== Production ==
=== Development ===
The film was officially announced on 3 August 2020 to mark the occasion of Raksha Bandhan. Akshay Kumar stated that it is the quickest film he has signed in his career, and dedicated the film to his sister Alka Hiranandani who also serves as co-producer. Originally this film was scheduled to release on 13 December 2021.

=== Filming ===
Principal photography for the film commenced on 23 January 2021. In April 2021, K.U Mohanan replaced Anshuman Mahaley as a Cinematographer due to scheduling conflicts. First schedule ended in July 2021 at Mumbai. The film was wrapped up in Delhi in December 2021.

== Music ==
Raksha Bandhan

Soundtrack album by Himesh Reshammiya
- Released: 6 August 2022
- Recorded: 2021
- Genre: Feature film soundtrack
- Length: 48:55
- Language: Hindi
- Label: Zee Music Company
- Producer: Himesh Reshammiya

Himesh Reshammiya chronology
| Middle Class Love (2021) | Raksha Bandhan (2022) | Bad Boy (2023) |

Official audio
- Raksha Bandhan - Full Album on YouTube

The songs were composed by Himesh Reshammiya while film score was composed and produced by Ishaan Chhabra. Irshad Kamil has written the lyrics. The first song of the album "Tere Sath Hoon Main", sung by Nihal Tauro was released on 29 June 2022. The second song "Kangan Ruby", sung by Reshammiya himself was released on 6 July 2022. The third song titled "Done Kar Do", sung by Navraj Hans was released on 18 July 2022 and it was the first song from an Indian film to have an international release, being launched in the UK. The fourth song "Dhaagon Se Baandhaa", sung by Shreya Ghoshal and Arijit Singh was released on 28 July 2022.

Track listing
| No. | Title | Singer(s) | Length |
|---|---|---|---|
| 1. | "Tere Saath Hoon Main" | Nihal Tauro | 5:45 |
| 2. | "Dhaagon Se Baandhaa" | Arijit Singh, Shreya Ghoshal | 4:45 |
| 3. | "Kangan Ruby" | Himesh Reshammiya | 4:02 |
| 4. | "Done Kar Do" | Navraj Hans, Jyotica Tangri | 3:48 |
| 5. | "Kangan Ruby" (House Mix) | Himesh Reshammiya, Akasa Singh, Akshay The One | 4:33 |
| 6. | "Raksha Bandhan" | Shreya Ghoshal | 4:43 |
| 7. | "Raksha Bandhan" (Reprise) | Shreya Ghoshal, Stebin Ben | 5:27 |
| 8. | "Bidaai" | Romy | 5:44 |
| 9. | "Bidaai" (Reprise) | Nooran Sisters, Romy | 5:44 |
| 10. | "Tu Bichhde Toh" | Nihal Tauro | 4:24 |
| Total length: | | | 48:55 |

== Marketing ==
The cast of Raksha Bandhan was on a promotional spree, visiting different cities across India, ahead of its release. The team, including Akshay Kumar, Aanand L Rai, Sadia Khateeb, Smrithi Srikanth, Sahejmeen Kaur and Deepika Khanna, visited Dubai, Pune, Indore and Hyderabad. On 7 August 2022, the team of Raksha Bandhan film visited Hyderabad to attend a press conference at a multiplex. Akshay took his on-screen sisters to the famous MG Road at Durga Gold and Silver (Durga Jewellers), for some pearl shopping and continued the tradition of gifting.

== Controversy ==
Right wing Hindu nationalists started a Twitter campaign to boycott the film, the campaign was against the film's screenwriter Kanika Dhillon for her old allegedly anti-Hindu tweets with offensive references to gomutra and tweets where she had mocked the Modi government; these Tweets were later deleted.

== Release ==
=== Theatrical ===
The film was theatrically released on 11 August 2022, coinciding with Raksha Bandhan and Independence Day.

=== Home media ===
The digital streaming rights of the film were acquired by ZEE5. The film digitally was released on ZEE5 from 5 October 2022.

== Reception ==
=== Box office ===
Raksha Bandhan earned ₹8.20 crores at the domestic box office on its opening day. On the second day, the film collected ₹6.40 crore. On the third day, the film collected ₹6.51 crore. On the fourth day, the film collected ₹7.05 crore taking a total domestic weekend collection to ₹28.16 crore.

As of 8 September 2022, the film grossed ₹52.82 crore (US$5.5 million) in India and ₹8.76 crore (US$910,000) overseas, for a worldwide gross collection of ₹61.58 crore (US$6.4 million).

=== Critical response ===
The film received mixed to negative reviews from critics. On the review aggregator website Rotten Tomatoes, 18% of 11 critics' reviews are positive, with an average rating of 2.8/10.

A critic for Bollywood Hungama rated the film 3.5 out of 5 stars and wrote, "The Akshay Kumar starrer Raksha Bandhan is a touching family saga, with a highly emotional second half that uplifts the film." Aman Wadhwa of DNA India rated the film 3 out of 5 stars and wrote, "Akshay Kumar's heartfelt and earnest performance is the biggest strength of Raksha Bandhan." Archika Khurana of The Times of India rated the film 2.5 out of 5 stars and wrote, "This highly emotional drama doesn't fail to touch you, but it had the potential to be a far more entertaining watch." Zinia Bandyopadhyay of News 18 rated the film 2.5 out of 5 stars and wrote, "it is one of those films that you can watch with the entire family, as they come together for Raksha Bandhan. Moreover, it will make you laugh and cry in equal parts."

In contrast, Nandini Ramnath of Scroll.in rated the film 2 out of 5 stars and wrote, "Raksha Bandhan harps away on the evils of the bride price practice before concluding that in an ideal world, women should be the ones demanding dowry." Shubhra Gupta of The Indian Express rated the film 1.5 out of 5 stars and wrote, "Do the filmmakers truly believe that such low-rent family dramas, with their uneasy mix of humour and crassness, is the way out for a beleaguered Bollywood?" Saibal Chatterjee of NDTV rated the film 1 out of 5 stars and wrote, "It is hard to believe that anybody would make a film such as this in 2022. The girls of Raksha Bandhan, like the film itself, are caught in a time warp." Monika Rawal Kukreja of The Hindustan Times stated, "Akshay Kumar's films delivers a strong message on dowry without trivialising the issue while managing to be an entertaining watch."
