= Tabbar =

Indian Hindi-language thriller streaming television series

- Genre: Thriller
- Created by: Harman Wadala
- Written by: Harman Wadala; Sandeep Jain; Mr. Roy
- Directed by: Ajitpal Singh
- Starring: Supriya Pathak; Pavan Malhotra; Sahil Mehta; Ranvir Shorey; Kanwaljit Singh
- Music by: Sneha Khanwalkar
- Country of origin: India
- Original languages: Hindi; Punjabi
- No. of seasons: 1
- No. of episodes: 8

Production
- Executive producer: Samir Khurana
- Producer: Ajay G. Rai
- Cinematography: Arun Kumar Pandey
- Editor: Parikshhit Jha
- Running time: 32-47 minutes
- Production company: Jar Pictures

Original release
- Network: SonyLIV
- Release: 15 October 2021

Tabbar (transl. Family) is an Indian Hindi-Punjabi language thriller streaming television series created and written by Harman Wadala, directed by Ajitpal Singh and produced by Ajay G. Rai for SonyLIV, and premiered on 15 October 2021. It stars Pavan Malhotra, Supriya Pathak, Gagan Arora, Sahil Mehta, Kanwaljit Singh and Ranvir Shorey in lead roles.

At the 2022 Filmfare OTT Awards, Tabbar received 11 nominations, including Best Drama Series and Best Director in a Drama Series (Singh), and won a leading 8 awards, including Best Series (Critics), Best Director in a Series (Critics) (Singh), Best Actor in a Drama Series (Malhotra), Best Supporting Actor in a Drama Series (Arora) and Best Supporting Actress in a Drama Series (Pathak).

== Cast ==
- Pavan Malhotra as Omkar Singh
- Supriya Pathak as Sargun Kaur
- Gagan Arora as Happy
- Sahil Mehta as Tegi
- Ranvir Shorey as Ajeet Sodhi
- Kanwaljit Singh as Inderji
- Paramvir Singh Cheema as Lucky
- Swairaj Sandhu as Jagtar Singh, Lucky's father
- Anita Shabdeesh as Ranjeet Kaur, Lucky's mother
- Nupur Nagpal as Palak Mahajan
- Babla Kochhar as Suneel Mahajan, Palak's father
- Seema Kaushal as Tanu Mahajan, Palak's mother
- Rachit Bahal as Maheep Sodhi, Ajeet's brother
- Ali Mughal as Multan, Ajeet's henchman
- Varun Narang, Doctor

== Synopsis ==
The story centers around Omkar Singh, a Punjab Police retiree who lives in Jalandhar with his wife and two sons. Upon return from Delhi, the elder son (Happy) accidentally exchanges a similar-looking bag with another passenger's (Maheep Sodhi) at the train station. When Maheep, who is the younger brother of a businessman-turned-politician (Ajeet Sodhi) arrives at their home to reclaim his bag, a fateful incident occurs that puts Omkar and his family in a precarious predicament. The story of Tabbar follows the lengths Omkar will go to protect his family whilst navigating a web of deception and inquisition.

== Reception ==
Tabbar received positive reviews from the viewers and the critics. The Times of India stated it to be an "Engrossing and intense family drama". "The story keeps one hooked on to it," said Dainik Jagran. ABP called it to be an "Enthralling thriller with amazing performances".

MoneyControl stated, "the storytelling is so compelling that you will watch as the lies and blood keep mounting."

KoiMoi said, "Pavan Malhotra-led thriller is as dark as it gets without a minute of ease."

Prathyush Parasuraman of Firstpost wrote, The tension rarely slips, and the acting, aided by Sneha Khanwalkar’s moody melodies, ground you to a world you begin to care enough to be devastated for.

Shweta Keshri of India Today wrote, Tabbar boasts of some great performances. Pavan Malhotra is exceptionally good in the thriller, who gets into his character of Omkar Singh with ease.

== Episodes ==
=== Series 1 ===
No. overall	No. in season	Title	Directed by	Written by	Original release date
1	1	"Karam Din"	Ajitpal Singh	Harman Wadala; Sandeep Jain; Mr. Roy	15 October 2021
2	2	"Jhooth"	Ajitpal Singh	Harman Wadala; Sandeep Jain; Mr. Roy	15 October 2021
3	3	"Sach"	Ajitpal Singh	Harman Wadala; Sandeep Jain; Mr. Roy	15 October 2021
4	4	"Tureya Ja"	Ajitpal Singh	Harman Wadala; Sandeep Jain; Mr. Roy	15 October 2021
5	5	"Kaala"	Ajitpal Singh	Harman Wadala; Sandeep Jain; Mr. Roy	15 October 2021
6	6	"Ishq"	Ajitpal Singh	Harman Wadala; Sandeep Jain; Mr. Roy	15 October 2021
7	7	"Hanera"	Ajitpal Singh	Harman Wadala; Sandeep Jain; Mr. Roy	15 October 2021
8	8	"Birha"	Ajitpal Singh	Harman Wadala; Sandeep Jain; Mr. Roy	15 October 2021

== Accolades ==
Year	Award ceremony	Category	Nominee / work	Result	Ref.
2022	Filmfare OTT Awards	Best Drama Series	Tabbar	Nominated	
2022	Filmfare OTT Awards	Best Series (Critics)	Tabbar	Won	
2022	Filmfare OTT Awards	Best Director in a Drama Series	Ajitpal Singh	Nominated	
2022	Filmfare OTT Awards	Best Director in a Series (Critics)	Ajitpal Singh	Won	
2022	Filmfare OTT Awards	Best Actor in a Drama Series	Pavan Malhotra	Won	
2022	Filmfare OTT Awards	Best Supporting Actor in a Drama Series	Gagan Arora	Won	
2022	Filmfare OTT Awards	Best Supporting Actress in a Drama Series	Supriya Pathak	Won	
2022	Filmfare OTT Awards	Best Original Story (Series)	Harman Wadala, Sandeep Jain and Mr. Roy	Won	
2022	Filmfare OTT Awards	Best Original Screenplay (Series)	Harman Wadala, Sandeep Jain and Mr. Roy	Nominated	
2022	Filmfare OTT Awards	Best Background Music (Series)	Sneha Khanwalkar	Won	
2022	Filmfare OTT Awards	Best Production Design (Series)	Vipin Kamboj	Nominated	
2022	Filmfare OTT Awards	Best Cinematographer (Series)	Arun Kumar Pandey	Nominated	
2022	Filmfare OTT Awards	Best Editing (Series)	Parikshhit Jha	Won	
