= Guilty Minds =

Indian Hindi-language legal drama television series

- promotional poster
- Genre: Legal drama
- Created by: Shefali Bhushan
- Written by: Shefali Bhushan; Manav Bhushan; Deeksha Gujral; Jayant Digambar Somalkar
- Directed by: Shefali Bhushan; Jayant Digambar Somalkar
- Starring: Shriya Pilgaonkar; Varun Mitra; Sugandha Garg; Satish Kaushik; Namrata Seth; Kulbhushan Kharbanda
- Music by: Sagar Desai
- Country of origin: India
- Original language: Hindi
- No. of seasons: 1
- No. of episodes: 10

Production
- Executive producer: Shefali Bhushan
- Producer: Karan Grover
- Cinematography: Siddharth Srinivasan
- Editor: Navnita Sen
- Running time: 45–50 minutes
- Production company: A Singro Media Innovation PVT LTD Production

Original release
- Network: Amazon Video
- Release: 22 April 2022

Guilty Minds is an Indian Hindi-language legal drama television series on Amazon Prime Video. The series is written and directed by Shefali Bhushan and Jayant Digambar Somalkar. This series stars Shriya Pilgaonkar, Varun Mitra, Sugandha Garg, Kulbhushan Kharbanda and Satish Kaushik in lead roles.

At the 2022 Filmfare OTT Awards, Guilty Minds received 6 nominations, including Best Drama Series, Best Director in a Drama Series (Bhushan), Best Actress in a Drama Series (Pilgaonkar) and Best Actor in a Drama Series (Mitra).

== Plot ==
The story revolves around Kashaf Quaze, Deepak Rana and Vandana Kathpalia, three law school friends who are often put opposite each other in the court of law. Kashaf and Vandana run a law centre where they take up class action and humanitarian cases while Deepak is a partner at Khanna & Khanna Associates, a popular law firm with rich clients. Each episode in the series dwells with issues such as rape, artificial intelligence, water shortage and how those issues interact with the lives and principles of the characters.

== Episodes ==
No.	Title	Directed by	Written by	Original release date
1	"Mine or Yours"	Unknown	Unknown	April 20, 2022
Film star Mala Kumari accuses renowned filmmaker Divendu Khanna of molesting her at the start of her career. Kahsaf represents Mala while Deepak defends Divendu using female advocate Neela Raghunandan and main counsel.
2	"Finisher"	Unknown	Unknown	April 22, 2022
3	"Water"	Unknown	Unknown	April 22, 2022
4	"Sperma"	Unknown	Unknown	April 22, 2022
5	"Aalaap"	Unknown	Unknown	April 22, 2022
6	"EHNO"	Unknown	Unknown	April 22, 2022
7	"Deep Waters"	Unknown	Unknown	April 22, 2022
8	"Plan Your Baby"	Unknown	Unknown	April 22, 2022
9	"Alola"	Unknown	Unknown	April 22, 2022
10	"Guilt"	Unknown	Unknown	April 22, 2022

== Cast ==
- Shriya Pilgaonkar as Kashaf Quaze, Munawwar's daughter
- Varun Mitra as Deepak Rana
- Sugandha Garg as Vandana Kathpalia
- Namrata Sheth as Shubhangi Khanna, L. N. Khanna's grand-daughter
- Satish Kaushik as Tejinder Bhalla
- Kulbhushan Kharbanda as L. N. Khanna
- Benjamin Gilani as Munawwar Quaze, Kashaf's father
- Pranay Pachauri as Shubhrat Khanna, Shubhangi's cousin and L. N. Khanna's grand-son
- Diksha Juneja as Riya Singh, Shubhrat's girlfriend
- Sadhana Singh as Mumtaz
- Deepak Kalra as Kitu Bhalla, Tejinder's son and Deepak's best friend
- Chitrangada Satarupa as Sunanda Bose
- Virendra Saxena as Vishwambar Chauhan
- Karishma Tanna as Mala Kumari
- Suchitra Krishnamurthy as Neela Raghunandan
- Dinker Sharma as Hasan
- Akshay Baghel as Abhijeet
- Vasundhara Kaul as Antara
- Arun Kalra as Shamsher Khanna
- Meet Vora as Prateek Malhotra
- Hans Dev Sharma as Dilrah Khanaa
- Atul Kumar as Diveyendu Khurana
- Suhita Thatte as Justice Shukla
- Shakti Kapoor as Anwar (Episode-5 Aalaap)

== Reception ==
Guilty Minds received positive to mixed reviews.

Shubhra Gupta from The Indian Express writes, "This is a well-done, well-acted show. My only quibble is the banal title ‘Guilty Minds’, which feels un-nuanced for a show which says everyone is innocent until they are proved guilty, and maybe not even then. Just by virtue of the fact that one of the lead characters is Muslim, whose unresolved childhood trauma can belong to anyone– religion, caste, creed no bar– makes it a big win, given our times."

Abhimanyu Mathur from Hindustan Times writes that "It is refreshing to see the courtrooms of India depicted as how they are, and hats off to showrunner Shefali Bhushan for that."

== Accolades ==
Year	Award ceremony	Category	Nominee / work	Result	Ref.
2022	Filmfare OTT Awards	Best Drama Series	Guilty Minds	Nominated	
2022	Filmfare OTT Awards	Best Director in a Drama Series	Shefali Bhushan	Nominated	
2022	Filmfare OTT Awards	Best Actress in a Drama Series	Shriya Pilgaonkar	Nominated	
2022	Filmfare OTT Awards	Best Actor in a Drama Series	Varun Mitra	Nominated	
2022	Filmfare OTT Awards	Best Background Music (Series) nom	Sagar Desai	Nominated	
2022	Filmfare OTT Awards	Best Production Design (Series) nom	Vikram Singh	Nominated	
