= Gagan Arora =

Indian actor

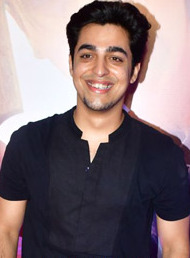
- Arora in 2023
- Occupation: Actor
- Years active: 2018–present
- Spouse: Muditaa (m. 2022)

Gagan Arora is an Indian actor best known for his roles in the shows College Romance (2018-present), and the Sony Liv drama series Tabbar (2021) for which he won a Filmfare OTT Award for Best Supporting Actor in a Drama Series.

== Personal life ==
Arora completed his graduation in Delhi. After graduation, he moved to Mumbai to pursue a career in acting.

In February 2022, Arora tied the knot with his longtime girlfriend Muditaa.

== Career ==
Before his acting debut, Arora worked as an assistant director on Amar Kaushik's 2018 film Stree. He made his acting debut with The Viral Fever's College Romance (2018), for which he received praise from critics and the audience. He subsequently starred in The Viral Fever's series Girls Hostel (2018–2021), Basement Company (2020) and 4 Thieves (2020). In 2019, he starred in a short film titled Padh Le Basanti, which is directed by Sangram Naiksatam.

He made his film debut with Ujda Chaman (2019) in a supporting role, which was directed by Abhishek Pathak. The film was about a balding 30-year-old bachelor who is in search of a wife and is given a deadline to find one or remain celibate forever. The film starred Sunny Singh and Maanvi Gagroo.

In 2021, Arora reprised his role of Bagga in College Romance 2. The show was well received by critics and audience. In October 2021, he appeared in Sony LIV's Tabbar, directed by Ajitpal Singh. The show starred Pavan Malhotra, Supriya Pathak, Ranvir Shorey and Kanwaljeet Singh. The show received positive reviews, from critics and audiences.

In 2022, he appeared in Madhuri Dixit starrer Netflix's The Fame Game.

== Filmography ==
=== Films ===
Year	Title	Role	Notes
2018	Stree	—N/a	Assistant director
2019	Padh Le Basanti	Dj Kabir Singh	Short film
2019	Ujda Chaman	Goldy	
2025	Jewel Thief – The Heist Begins	Avi Roy	

=== Web series ===
Year	Title	Role	Notes
2018–2023	College Romance	Bagga	
2018–2021	Girls Hostel	Aarav	
2020	4 Thieves	Vicky	
2020	Basement Company	Raj Chadda	
2021	Tabbar	Happy	
2022	The Fame Game	Madhav	
2023	SK Sir Ki Class	Ashish Arora	
2024	Industry	Ayush Verma	
2025	Khauf	Nakul	

== Awards and nominations ==
Year	Award	Category	Work	Result	Ref.
2022	Filmfare OTT Awards	Best Supporting Actor in a Series (Male): Drama	Tabbar	Won	
2023	Critics' Choice Awards	Best Supporting Actor (Series)	Tabbar	Nominated	
2023	Filmfare OTT Awards	Best Actor in a Series (Male): Comedy	College Romance	Nominated	
