= Sahil Mehta (actor, born 1997) =

Indian film actor (born 1997)

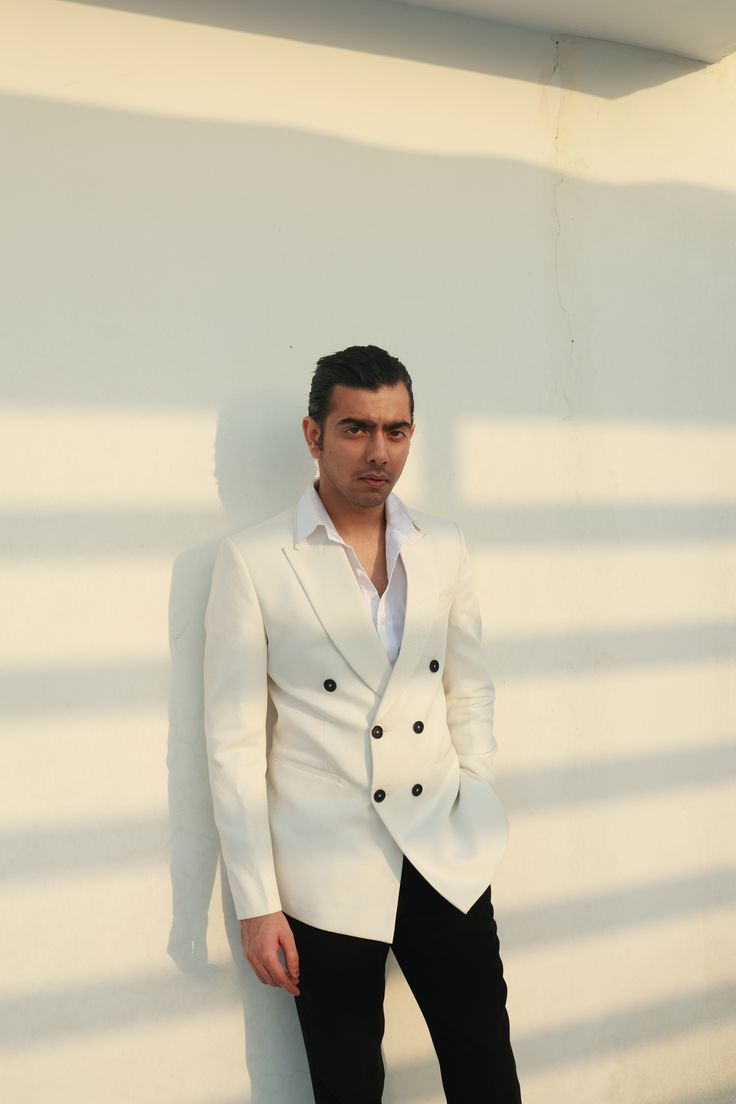
- Born: 6 August 1997 (age 29); New Delhi, India
- Occupation: Actor
- Years active: 2019–present
- Website: sahilmehta.in

Sahil Mehta (born 6 August 1997) is an Indian film actor known for roles in Tabbar (2021), Good Luck Jerry (2022), Raksha Bandhan (2022), Farrey (2023), The Waking of a Nation (2025), Loot Kaand (2025) and Son of Sardaar 2 (2025).

== Early life and education ==
Sahil Mehta was born in Delhi, India and graduated in 2018 with a BSc (Honours) in Biochemistry from Shivaji College, University of Delhi. While at college, he was active in the Dramatic Society, Vayam.

== Career ==
Mehta made his first on-screen appearance with a blink-and-miss role in the 2017 film Hindi Medium, starring Irrfan Khan. He appeared briefly in a flashback sequence during the song ‘Hoor.’ In an interview with Filmfare, Mehta described it as his first on-set experience in a feature film.

Mehta’s breakout role came in the web‑series Tabbar (2021), in which he portrayed Tegi.

In 2022, Mehta appeared in the film Good Luck Jerry alongside Janhvi Kapoor, directed by Siddharth Sen. According to News18, Mehta’s performance in Good Luck Jerry was considered “one of the highlights of the film.” Later, he appeared in Raksha Bandhan, directed by Aanand L. Rai and starring Akshay Kumar.

In 2023, Mehta appeared in the student‑heist thriller Farrey, directed by Soumendra Padhi and produced by Salman Khan.

Birha, a short film starring Sahil Mehta, won Best Short Film at the 2023 New York Indian Film Festival.

In 2025, Mehta appeared in the web series Loot Kaand, directed by Ruchir Arun, alongside Tanya Maniktala. Later in 2025, he played the role of Ali Allahbaksh in the period drama series The Waking of a Nation, directed by Ram Madhvani and released on SonyLIV.

In 2025, he appeared in the comedy franchise film Son of Sardaar 2, directed by Vijay Kumar Arora.

== Filmography ==
=== Feature films ===
| Year | Title | Role | Director | Production | Platform | Ref. |
|---|---|---|---|---|---|---|
| 2020 | Guilty | Arnab Mitra | Ruchi Narain | Dharmatic Entertainment | Netflix | |
| 2022 | Good Luck Jerry | Jigar | Siddharth Sen | Colour Yellow Productions | Disney+ Hotstar | |
| 2022 | Raksha Bandhan | Gaffar | Aanand L Rai | Colour Yellow Productions | Zee5 | |
| 2023 | Farrey | Aakash | Soumendra Padhi | Salman Khan Films | Zee5 | |
| 2025 | Son of Sardaar 2 | Goggi | Vijay Kumar Arora | Devgn Films | Netflix | |

=== Web series ===
| Year | Title | Role | Director | Production | Platform | Ref. |
|---|---|---|---|---|---|---|
| 2021 | Tabbar | Tegi | Ajitpal Singh | JAR Pictures | SonyLIV | |
| 2025 | Loot Kaand | Palash | Ruchir Arun | Drishyam Films | Amazon MX Player | |
| 2025 | The Waking of a Nation | Ali Allahbaksh | Ram Madhvani | Ram Madhvani Films | SonyLIV | |

=== Short films ===
| Year | Title | Role | Director | Platform | Ref. |
|---|---|---|---|---|---|
| 2022 | Birha: The Journey Back Home | Inder | Puneet Prakash | Disney+ Hotstar | |
| 2023 | Gair (Pariah) | Rahul | Nishant Roy Bombarde | Released | |
