= Good Luck Jerry =

2022 film directed by Sidharth Sen

- Official release poster
- Directed by: Siddharth Sen
- Written by: Pankaj Matta
- Based on: Kolamaavu Kokila by Nelson Dilipkumar
- Produced by: Subaskaran Allirajah; Aanand L. Rai; Mahaveer Jain
- Starring: Janhvi Kapoor; Sahil Mehta; Jaswant Singh Dalal; Mita Vashisht; Samta Sudiksha; Deepak Dobriyal; Neeraj Sood
- Cinematography: Rangarajan Ramabadran
- Edited by: Prakash Chandra Sahoo; Zubin Sheikh
- Music by: Score: Aman Pant; Songs: Parag Chhabra
- Production companies: Lyca Productions; Mahaveer Jain Films; Colour Yellow Productions
- Distributed by: Disney+ Hotstar
- Release date: 29 July 2022
- Running time: 119 minutes
- Country: India
- Language: Hindi

Good Luck Jerry is a 2022 Indian Hindi-language black comedy crime film directed by debutant Siddharth Sen, written by Pankaj Matta and produced by Subaskaran Allirajah, Aanand L. Rai and Mahaveer Jain of Mahaveer Jain Films. A remake of the 2018 Tamil film Kolamaavu Kokila written and directed by Nelson Dilipkumar, it stars Janhvi Kapoor as the titular lead alongside Deepak Dobriyal, Sahil Mehta, Mita Vashisht, Neeraj Sood, Saurabh Sachdeva, Sushant Singh and debutant Samta Sudiksha in pivotal roles. The film premiered on 29 July 2022 on Disney+ Hotstar.

== Plot ==
Jaya Kumari alias Jerry lives in a small town in Punjab with her mother, Sharbati, and younger sister, Chhaya (Cherry). Working as a masseuse, Jerry struggles to support her family. Their lives are turned upside down when Sharbati is diagnosed with lung cancer and requires ₹25 lakh for treatment. Desperate for money, Jerry becomes involved with a drug trafficking gang led by Timmy and Daler after accidentally crossing paths with them. Although initially frightened, she gradually becomes an efficient drug courier and earns enough money to fund her mother's treatment while hiding the truth from her family.

As Jerry becomes trapped in the dangerous criminal world, she faces betrayal, violence, and constant threats to her family's safety. After escaping an assault by Timmy, she tries to leave the business, but her mother and sister are taken hostage and she is forced into one final massive drug delivery. Using her intelligence and quick thinking, Jerry repeatedly deceives the gang by replacing most of the cocaine with harmless substances such as salt, sugar, and flour. With the help of her family, friends, and a police inspector, she eventually outsmarts the criminals, leading to the destruction of the drug cartel. In the end, Jerry secures her family's safety, keeps control of the hidden drugs, and walks away free, realizing that surviving life's challenges requires courage, determination, and a bit of luck.

== Cast ==
- Janhvi Kapoor as Jaya "Jerry" Kumari
- Samta Sudiksha as Chhaya "Cherry" Kumari
- Deepak Dobriyal as Rinku Khanna
- Mita Vashisht as Sharbati Kumari
- Younus Howlader
- Neeraj Sood as Anil Mehra
- Sushant Singh as Daler
- Sahil Mehta as Jigar
- Saurabh Sachdeva as Ram Malik
- Sandeep Nayak as Jagdish
- Shubham Raj as Drug peddler
- Jaswant Singh Dalal as Timmy
- Mohan Kamboj as Mahinder Singh Chandal a.k.a. Daddu
- Tashi Kalden as Tenzin

== Production ==
Principal photography commenced on 11 January 2021 in Punjab. The film was wrapped up on 20 March 2021.

== Soundtrack ==
Good Luck Jerry

Soundtrack album by Parag Chhabra
- Released: 17 June 2022
- Recorded: 2021
- Genre: Feature film soundtrack
- Length: 19:29
- Label: Zee Music Company

Official audio
- Good Luck Jerry - Full Album on YouTube

Distributed and released by Zee Music Company, the soundtrack of Good Luck Jerry is composed entirely by Parag Chhabra in his first solo venture, with lyrics by Raj Shekhar. Aman Pant composed the background score.

Track listing
No.	Title	Singer(s)	Length
1.	"Mor Mor"	Deedar Kaur, Gurlej Akhtar, Vivek Hariharan, Parag Chhabra, Pinky Maidasani	2:59
2.	"Paracetamol"	Jubin Nautiyal, Parag Chhabra, Soom T, Shehnaz Akhtar, Sahil Akhtar	4:04
3.	"Jogan"	Romy, Rupali Jagga, Nikhita Gandhi, Parag Chhabra	4:13
4.	"Jhand Ba"	Madhubanti Bagchi, Parag Chhabra	3:41
5.	"Cutie Cutie"	Nakash Aziz, Parag Chhabra, Gary Misquitta, Rishikesh Karmerkar, Keshia Braganza, Suzanne D'Mello	2:56
6.	"Jhand Ba (Sad)"	Madhubanti Bagchi, Parag Chhabra	1:36
Total length:			19:29

== Reception ==
On the review aggregator website Rotten Tomatoes, 86% of 7 critics' reviews are positive, with an average rating of 5.6/10.

Dishya Sharma of News 18 rated the film 3.5 out of 5 stars and wrote, "Good Luck Jerry is chaotic and fun, bringing back memories of simple comedies such as Hungama and Tanu Weds Manu. I did wish this was a theatrical release." Dhaval Roy of The Times of India rated the film 3.5 out of 5 stars and wrote, "Good Luck Jerry is a hilarious and entertaining fare that would have been perfect if it were a tad shorter." Rohit Bhatnagar of The Free Press Journal rated the film 3.5 out of 5 stars and wrote, "Good Luck Jerry is the perfect weekend binge with a runtime of 119 minutes. Watch it for Janhvi's performance and dark humour." Shubham Kulkarni of Koimoi rated the film 3.5 out of 5 stars and wrote, "Janhvi Kapoor is proving herself film after film. I hope she only gets better at her craft. The film as a whole is a fun watch and has its own amazing moments."

A critic for Bollywood Hungama rated the film 3 out of 5 stars and wrote, "GOOD LUCK JERRY rests on a wellwritten script, strong performances and good humour." A critic for Pinkvilla rated the film 3 out of 5 stars and wrote, "Good Luck Jerry is an entertaining ride despite some hiccups in the narrative. It's a film made for the OTT, and this section of the audience should embrace the dark comedy space with open arms." Shubhra Gupta of The Indian Express rated the film 2.5 out of 5 stars and wrote, "Despite a few slack patches, this Janhvi Kapoor-starrer never loses sight of the fact that it needs to be a caper." Saibal Chatterjee of NDTV rated the film 2.5 out of 5 stars and wrote, "The film benefits from the effort that Janhvi puts and the support that she gets from the rest of the cast, made up mostly of actors who definitely deserve to be busy and popular."
