= Manoj Kumar Khatoi =

Indian film cinematographer

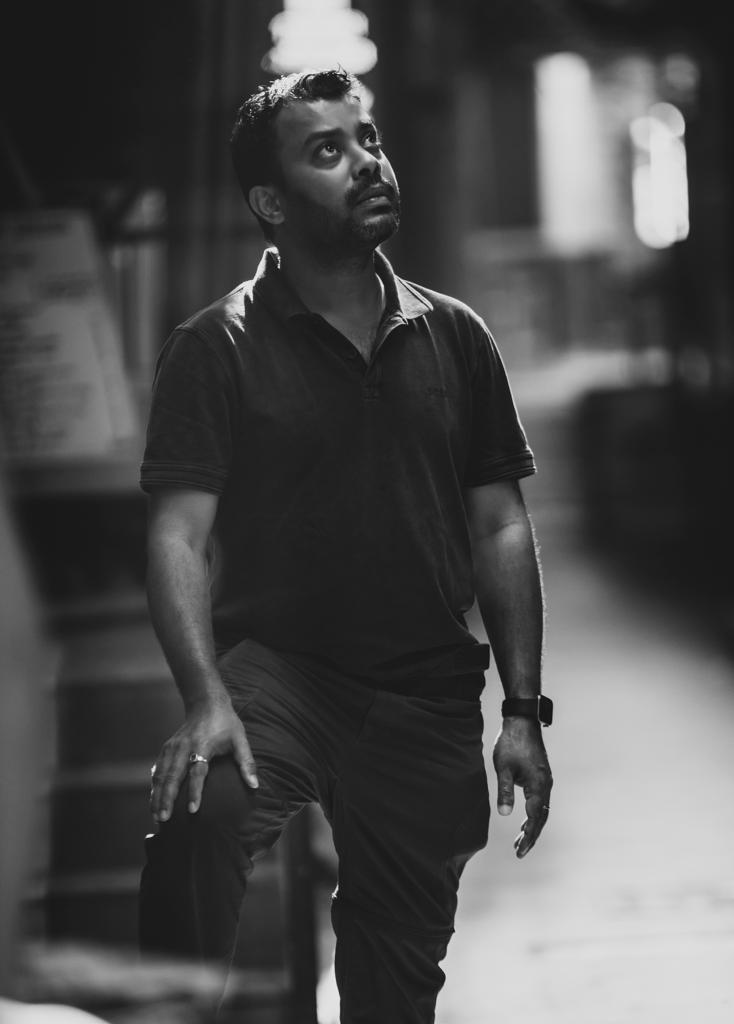
- Khatoi in 2022, Delhi
- Born: Konark, Odisha, India
- Occupation: Cinematographer
- Years active: 2013 - present
- Known for: Notebook (2019 film), Jawaani Jaaneman, The Fame Game, Budhia Singh – Born to Run and Mitron

Manoj Kumar Khatoi is an Indian cinematographer from Odisha. He is best known for the films Yeh Prem Mol Liya, Notebook (2019 film), Jawaani Jaaneman, The Fame Game, Budhia Singh – Born to Run and Mitron.

== Early life and career ==
Manoj Kumar Khatoi was raised in Konark, Odisha, India and completed his course from Biju Pattanaik Film and Television Institute of Odisha. His movie Budhia Singh – Born to Run starring Manoj Bajpayee has won National Film Award. He filmed for the movie Notebook in 2019. In 2022, he did a web series The Fame Game on Netflix starring Madhuri Dixit. Manoj has also worked in other popular films like Jawaani Jaaneman, Mitron, B.Tech and Classmates to name a few.

In 2022, Manoj worked as a Cinematographer for notable films The Fame Game, Mismatched season 2 and Uunchai.

In 2023 and 2024 he shot the films Trial Period and Akshay Kumar starrer Khel Khel Mein.

In 2025, Manoj has worked as a Cinematographer in Arjun Kapoor and Bhumi Pednekar starrer Mere Husband Ki Biwi.

In June 2025, Manoj Kumar Khatoi started his own production house "HM Studios" along with his partner Hema Manoj Khatoi.

== Selected filmography ==
=== As cinematographer ===
Key
†	Denotes films that have not yet been released

Year	Film	Language	Notes
2013	Silence	Malayalam	
2014	Vegam	Malayalam	
2014	Shutter	Marathi	
2015	Classmates	Marathi	
2016	Paroksh	Hindi	
2016	Budhia Singh – Born to Run	Hindi	
2016	Photocopy	Marathi	
2018	B.Tech	Malayalam	
2018	Mitron	Hindi	
2019	Notebook	Hindi	
2019	Parchhayee	Hindi	Television series on ZEE5
2020	Jawaani Jaaneman	Hindi	
2020	Khayali Pulao	Hindi	Short film
2022	The Fame Game	Hindi	Television series on Netflix
2022	Mismatched	Hindi	Television series on Netflix; Season 2
2022	Uunchai	Hindi	
2023	Trial Period	Hindi	
2024	Khel Khel Mein	Hindi	
2024	He	Hindi	TV series
2025	Mere Husband Ki Biwi	Hindi	
2026	Yeh Prem Mol Liya †	Hindi	
