= Loot Kaand =

2025 Indian television series

- Promotional poster
- Genre: Action; Drama
- Written by: Ritu Shri. Aman Mannan. Ruchir Arun. Saurav Dey. Anurag Ramesh Shukla.
- Story by: Aman Mannan. Shamik Sengupta. Saurav Dey
- Directed by: Ruchir Arun
- Starring: Tanya Maniktala; Sahil Mehta; Gyanendra Tripathi
- Music by: Rajarshi Sanyal
- Country of origin: India
- Original language: Hindi
- No. of episodes: 6

Production
- Producer: Raghav Gupta
- Camera setup: Multi-camera
- Running time: 34–41 mins
- Production companies: Drishyam Films; N2O Films

Original release
- Network: Amazon MX Player
- Release: 20 March 2025

Loot Kaand (transl. Robbery Scandal) is a 2025 Indian Hindi-language action drama television series directed by Ruchir Arun. Produced under Drishyam Films and N2O Films, it stars Tanya Maniktala, Sahil Mehta and Gyanendra Tripathi. The series premiered on 20 March 2025 on Amazon MX Player.

== Cast ==
- Tanya Maniktala as Latika Mitra
- Sahil Mehta as Palash Mitra
- Gyanendra Tripathi as Pinaki Dev
- Saad Bilgrami as Toofan
- Brij Bhushan Shukla as Gangster Burman
- Akash Sinha as Batool
- Manwendra Tripathy as Munna
- Lima Das as Suparna Chatterjee
- Ronjini Chakraborty as Paro
- Prashansa Sharma as SI Mithu Roy
- Mihika Vasavada as Soni
- Nitin NS Goel as Saket Dhar
- Ruma Mondal as Bharoti Mitra
- Chanda Karanji as Charulata Basu

== Production ==
The series was announced on Amazon MX Player. The trailer of the series was released on 13 March 2025.

== Music ==
Loot Kaand

Soundtrack album by Rajarshi Sanyal
- Released: 21 March 2025
- Genre: Soundtrack
- Length: 29:55
- Language: Hindi
- Label: Amazon MX Player

Tracklisting
No.	Title	Length
1.	"Haath Jodi"	2:36
2.	"Loot Kaand Title Track"	1:00
3.	"Palash ka Dimaag"	1:51
4.	"Plan Kya hai?"	1:57
5.	"Paheliyaan"	1:24
6.	"Chori"	1:43
7.	"Pinaki and Batul"	1:53
8.	"Pa Dha Ni Sa"	1:20
9.	"Car Chase"	1:24
10.	"Toofan's Theme"	1:20
11.	"Fight"	2:22
12.	"Latika-Palash's Theme"	1:08
13.	"Bhediya"	1:38
14.	"The Story Part 1"	1:35
15.	"The Story Part 2"	1:09
16.	"Chor Police"	2:12
17.	"Death"	1:51
18.	"Raaz"	1:32
Total length:		29:55

== Release ==
The series was made available to stream on Amazon MX Player on 20 March 2025.

== Reception ==
Deepa Gahlot of Rediff.com awarded the series 2/5 stars and said that Loot Kaand tries to concoct a crime drama that arouses some curiosity but is instantly forgettable". Vinamra Mathur of the Firstpost gave the series 3 stars out of 5 and satated that "Loot Kaand is like that dish that satiates the appetite but leaves you wondering if you’d like to have it again when hunger arrives at your doorstep.". Archika Khurana of The Times of India rated it 3/5 stars and said that "If you’re looking for a crime drama with an unconventional heist at its center, 'Loot Kaand' is worth a watch."

Shaheen Irani of OTT Play rated it 3/5 stars and siad that "Loot Kaand takes time but gets interesting in bits-and-pieces. While it is not a series that demands all of your attention, this one can be streamed because of its cliffhanger endings." Nandini Ramnath of Scroll.in observed that "Loot Kaand merrily gallops from one twist to the next, hoping that nobody will notice how contrived it is." Troy Ribeiro of Free Press Journal rated it 3.5/5 stars and commented that it is a "Grit And Guns In A Promising Crime Drama."
