= Garmi (TV series) =

Indian-Hindi language political thriller show

- Genre: Thriller
- Created by: Tigmanshu Dhulia
- Written by: Tigmanshu Dhulia; Kamal Pandey
- Directed by: Tigmanshu Dhulia
- Starring: Vyom Yadav; Puneet Singh; Disha Thakur; Pankaj Saraswat; Ashish Virendra Chowdhary; Mukesh Tiwari; Vineet Kumar; Pravesh Rana; Jatin Sarin
- Country of origin: India
- Original language: Hindi
- No. of seasons: 1
- No. of episodes: 9

Production
- Producers: Swaroop Sampat; Hemal Thakkar
- Cinematography: Shailesh Awasthi
- Editor: Sourabh Prabhudesai
- Production company: Playtime Creationn

Original release
- Network: Sony LIV
- Release: 21 April 2023

Garmi is a 2023 Indian-Hindi language political thriller TV Series on Sony LIV. The series is directed by Tigmanshu Dhulia and produced by Swaroop Sampat and Hemal Thakkar. It stars Vyom Yadav, Puneet Singh, Veeneet Kumar, Jatin Goswami, Pankaj Saraswat, Anushka Kaushik, Ashish Virendra Chowdhary, Jatin Sarin ,Deepraj Rana, Mukesh Tiwari and Disha Thakur in key roles.

The show's teaser premiered on 30 March 2023, while the trailer launched on 17 April 2023. The series was exclusively released on Sony LIV on 21 April 2023. It received mixed reviews.

== Cast ==
- Vyom Yadav as Arvind Shukla
- Puneet Singh as Bindu Singh
- Disha Thakur as Surabhi
- Pankaj Saraswat as Jaiswal
- Mukesh Tiwari as Dilbag Singh
- Pravesh Rana as Dickey Singh
- Anurag Thakur as Govind Maurya
- Vineet Kumar as Bairagi Baba
- Shankar A Mishra as Aggarwal Contractor
- Anushka Kaushik as Ruchita
- Dheerendra Gautam as Ajay
- Jatin Goswami as Mrityunjay Singh
- Jatin Sarin as Latif
- Ashish Virendra Chowdhary as Vishwas
- Reetik Raj Ambsta as Brijesh Bambaaj
- Chandrahas Pandey as Umesh
- Abhishek Singh Rajput as Paritosh
- Aditya Pandey as shankar dada

== Synopsis ==
Garmi is the story of Arvind Shukla, a young man who aspires to become a civil servant but gets entangled in the world of college politics, powerplay and crime.

== Episodes ==
=== Season 1 ===
No.	Title	Directed by	Written by	Original release date
1	"Hello I am Arvind... Arvind Shukla"	Tigmanshu Dhulia	Tigmanshu Dhulia & Kamal Pandey	21 April 2023
Arvind Shukla reluctantly enrolls at Trivenipur University, where he is given preference by the college student president, Bindu Singh, for a hostel room. He realises that he has joined an institution that is well known for the student politics and rivalry between Govind Maurya and Bindu Singh.
2	"Feels Like Hell"	Tigmanshu Dhulia	Tigmanshu Dhulia & Kamal Pandey	21 April 2023
Arvind is welcomed by his seniors and gets the chance to adjust to the raging atmosphere of the college, where he makes new friends and understands the dynamics of student politics.
3	"Say Hello to The Devil"	Tigmanshu Dhulia	Tigmanshu Dhulia & Kamal Pandey	21 April 2023
Arvind experiences a brand-new emotion: love. He starts to revamp his personality and pick up new hobbies to be near his beloved. At the same time, he gradually begins to sink in the swamp of the college political system.
4	"End of Innocence"	Tigmanshu Dhulia	Tigmanshu Dhulia & Kamal Pandey	21 April 2023
Arvind’s life is shattered in no time when he sees something horrific done by the college president, Bindu Singh.
5	"Everything is Fair in Love and War"	Tigmanshu Dhulia	Tigmanshu Dhulia & Kamal Pandey	21 April 2023
The mastermind of the political power struggle persuades Arvind and Govind Maurya to form an alliance. Arvind is projected as guilty of a crime he did not commit. He, therefore, seeks the help of his best buddy Ajay, along with Govind, to get revenge.
6	"Welcome to Politics"	Tigmanshu Dhulia	Tigmanshu Dhulia & Kamal Pandey	21 April 2023
Blinded by vengeance, Arvind commits a crime. Police officer Mritunjay Singh, deeply enraged, takes up the task of to punish Arvind. In order to save himself from Mritunjay, Arvind takes refuge in student politics.
7	"Blood VS Books"	Tigmanshu Dhulia	Tigmanshu Dhulia & Kamal Pandey	21 April 2023
Govind Maurya lays out his nefarious plans for gains. All the odds are brought together to get Arvind out of jail. In an attempt to secure his release from prison, Arvind becomes entangled in a scheme and creates a new enemy while inside.
8	"What’s Brewing"	Tigmanshu Dhulia	Tigmanshu Dhulia & Kamal Pandey	21 April 2023
Govind Maurya’s jealousy toward Arvind leads him to make a serious blunder that costs him his chance to contest the student election for president.
9	"Hello I am Arvind Shukla…REBOOTED"	Tigmanshu Dhulia	Tigmanshu Dhulia & Kamal Pandey	21 April 2023
Arvind Shukla's situation unexpectedly improves. He receives a lot of political backing, which makes others envious of him. However, a sudden and unexpected turn in the game exposes him to greater dangers.

== Reception ==
Saibal Chatterjee of NDTV rated the series 3 stars out of 5 and wrote "Garmi is set in a world dominated by men, but the handful of girls who jostle their way in are no pushovers."

Deepa Gahlot of Rediff.com rated 2.5 stars out of 5 and wrote in her review "There is a lip-smacking indulgence to the way gruesome violence is filmed, and it is done without taking a stance against the amorality."

Anindita Mukherjee for India Today wrote "The show sensitively portrays how casteism is prevalent in certain parts of India to date."

Sanchita Jhunjhunwala for Zoom TV wrote "College, Crime, Caste, Politics, you name it and you will find those intertwining further with each episode."
