= R. Aravamudan =

Indian space scientist and engineer (1936–2021)

- Born: 7 October 1936; Madras, British Raj
- Died: 4 August 2021 (aged 84); Bangalore, Karnataka, India
- Occupation(s): Space scientist and engineer

Ramabhadran Aravamudan (7 October 1936 – 4 August 2021) was an Indian space scientist and engineer who was associated with the Indian space programme from its initial days in 1962. Through his career he served as the director of the Thumba Equatorial Rocket Launching Station, Satish Dhawan Space Centre, and the ISRO Satellite centre. He was a recipient of the 2009 Aryabhata Award from the Astronautical Society of India.

== Early life ==
Aravamudan was born into a middle-class family in Madras in the then-undivided India. He obtained a degree in electronics engineering from the Madras Institute of Technology, where he was a first-rank holder.

== Career ==
Aravamudan started his career with the Department of Atomic Energy (DAE) at the Trombay Reactor Control Division. He was amongst the first to join the Indian Space Research Organisation (ISRO), then known as the Indian National Committee for Space Research (INCOSPAR), when he quit his job at the DAE in 1962 to move to Trivandrum to work with Vikram Sarabhai, considered the father of India's space research. During this time, he also trained at NASA's Goddard Space Flight Center on assembling and launching small rockets for collecting scientific data. When he was working with ISRO's rocket launching station at Thumba, some of the most historic images of the rocket launch programme were captured by the French street photographer, Henri Cartier-Bresson. Aravamudan documented the early days of the Indian space programme in a book, ISRO: A Personal History, that he co-authored with his wife Gita Aravamudan. In the book, he writes about the conceptualisation of the programme, including selection of the launch site, the telemetry systems, and how the organisation worked with meagre resources owing to international embargoes and sanctions.

In the early 1970s, he served as the director of Thumba Equatorial Rocket Launching Station. In the 1980s, he became the associate director of Vikram Sarabhai Space Centre. In 1989, he took over as the director of Satish Dhawan Space Centre and in 1994, he moved to Bangalore as the director of ISRO Satellite Centre. He retired from ISRO in 1997.

Aravamudan was a recipient of the Aryabhata Award from the Astronautical Society of India in 2009 and the award for Outstanding Achievement from the Indian Space Research Organisation in 2010.

== Personal life ==
Aravamudan was married to Gita Aravamudan, a journalist. The couple had two sons.

Aravamudan died on 4 August 2021, at his house in Bangalore. He was aged 84. He had been diagnosed with kidney failure a year earlier.

== Books ==
- ISRO: A Personal History co-authored with his wife, Gita ISBN 978-9-3526-4363-9

== Awards ==
- The Aryabhata Award from The Astronautical Society of India (2009)
- Outstanding Achievement Award of ISRO (2010)
