= The Fame Game (TV series) =

Indian Hindi-language series

- Genre: Drama; Mystery; Thriller
- Created by: Sri Rao
- Directed by: Bejoy Nambiar; Karishma Kohli
- Starring: Madhuri Dixit; Sanjay Kapoor; Manav Kaul; Lakshvir Saran; Muskkan Jaferi
- Composers: Song : Salim-Sulaiman
- Country of origin: India
- Original languages: Hindi; Marathi
- No. of seasons: 1
- No. of episodes: 8

Production
- Executive producers: Karan Johar; Sri Rao
- Producers: Karan Johar; Somen Mishra
- Cinematography: Manoj Kumar Khatoi
- Editor: Monisha R. Baldawa
- Running time: 45–50 minutes
- Production company: Dharmatic Entertainment

Original release
- Network: Netflix
- Release: 25 February 2022

The Fame Game is an Indian mystery family drama television series on Netflix created by Sri Rao and directed by Bejoy Nambiar and Karishma Kohli. Produced by Karan Johar and Somen Mishra under the banner Dharmatic Entertainment, the series stars Madhuri Dixit as Anamika Anand, a famous Bollywood actress, with Sanjay Kapoor, Manav Kaul, Suhasini Mulay, Lakshvir Saran and Muskkaan Jaferi in pivotal supporting roles.

The series revolves around a Bollywood actress named Anamika Anand who suddenly goes missing one day. It premiered on Netflix on 25 February 2022.

== Premise ==
Anamika Anand is a Bollywood star who has a glamorous career and a seemingly idyllic family - but there is more to her personal life than meets the eye. She is physically and verbally abused by her husband, Nikhil More. While her daughter Amara aspires to be a great star like her mother, highlighting nepotism in the current Bollywood industry, her son Avinash has his own issues to face including his sexuality. Additionally, Anamika’s mother consistently berates her and other members of the family and uses manipulative techniques to achieve her goals. Her only solace is Manish Khanna, her frequent co-star and past lover. Anamika's sudden disappearance puts her personal life in the limelight and thus begins the quest to find her and the person behind her disappearance, which leads to the unveiling of many dark secrets.

== Cast ==
- Madhuri Dixit as Anamika Anand/Vijju Joshi, Nikhil's wife, Avinash and Amara's mother.
- Sanjay Kapoor as Nikhil More, Anamika's husband, and Amara's father.
- Manav Kaul as Manish Khanna, Anamika's co-star and lover and Avinash's father.
- Suhasini Mulay as Kalyani Anand, Anamika's mother.
- Rajshri Deshpande as Shobha Trivedi, Police officer investigating Anamika's case.
- Lakshvir Saran as Avinash (Avi), Anamika’s son.
- Muskkaan Jaferi as Amara, Anamika and Nikhil's daughter, Madhav's girlfriend.
- Gagan Arora as Madhav, Amara's boyfriend, Anamika's obsessed fan.
- Danish Sood as Samar, Avinash's boyfriend.
- Kashyap Shangari as Billy, Anamika's makeup artist.
- Shubhangi Latkar as Lata, the housekeeper
- Makarand Deshpande as Harilal, the movie poster painter.
- Ayesha Kaduskar as Tabitha Khanna, Manish Khanna and Sneha's daughter
- Harpreet Vir Singh as Financer PK Sharma
- Sanjay Dutt as cameo appearance from Kalank, when Amara tries to re-enact Anamika's role in the movie.

== Soundtrack ==
The Fame Game (Music from the Netflix Series)

Soundtrack album by Salim-Sulaiman
- Released: 25 February 2022
- Recorded: 2021
- Genre: Feature film soundtrack
- Length: 2:59
- Language: Hindi
- Label: Maisi Music Publishing
External audio
- Official Video Song on YouTube

The official song video "Dupatta Mera" focuses on the dance performance of Madhuri Dixit, while the promotional video also features Varun Dhawan, Siddharth Malhotra, Ishaan Khatter, Riteish Deshmukh, Jackie Shroff and Johnny Lever.

All music is composed by Salim-Sulaiman.

Track listing
No.	Title	Lyrics	Singer(s)	Length
1.	"Dupatta Mera"	Shraddha Pandit	Sunidhi Chauhan, Additional Vocal by Raj Pandit	2:59
Total length:				2:59

== Production ==
=== Development ===
Announced in May 2020 with the title Finding Anamika, the show was eventually renamed as The Fame Game.

=== Release ===
The series consisting of eight episodes premiered on Netflix on 25 February 2022.

=== Casting ===
Madhuri Dixit was cast in the titular role, and was joined by Sanjay Kapoor and Manav Kaul as the leads. The cast also included Lakshvir Saran and Muskkaan Jaferi as Madhuri’s character’s children.

== Reception ==
The Fame Game received positive reviews from critics. India TV gave the series 3.5 stars out of five and wrote "Dixit and the ensemble cast delivers pitch-perfect family drama". It further added "The Fame Game on Netflix takes the dysfunctional family trope and packs it with suspense and drama, making it an enjoyable and binge-worthy series." Sukanya Verma of Rediff gave the series 3.5 stars and wrote "What The Fame Game showcases is the depth and marvels of Dixit as she switches between star and human, mother and woman."

Saibal Chatterjee of NDTV too gave it 3 stars and summarized his review of the series as "The Incandescence Of Madhuri Dixit - Dive Right In". He praised Dixit's performance by saying "Dixit gets into the skin of the protagonist with such dazzling panache that the line separating the character from the performer is frequently breached."
