= Ghar Waapsi =

Indian family drama television series

- Genre: Family drama; Drama
- Directed by: Ruchir Arun
- Starring: Vishal Vashishtha; Atul Shrivastava; Vibha Chibber; Anushka Kaushik; Saad Bilgrami; Ajitesh Gupta; Gyanendra Tripathi; Ahmad Harhash
- Composer: Tusshar Mallik
- Country of origin: India
- Original language: Hindi
- No. of seasons: 1
- No. of episodes: 06

Production
- Executive producer: Kartik Krishnan
- Producer: Dice Media
- Running time: 40–55 minutes
- Production company: Dice Media

Original release
- Network: Disney+ Hotstar
- Release: 22 July 2022

Ghar Waapsi is an Indian Hindi-Language family drama television series created by Dice Media and directed by Ruchir Arun.

'Ghar Waapsi' revolves around Shekhar (Vishal Vashishtha), who returns to his hometown of Indore after he is fired from his job in Bengaluru. However, he decides to keep it a secret from his family. His life changes forever as he finds a road to self-discovery.

== Cast ==
- Vishal Vashishtha as Shekhar Dwivedi
- Atul Shrivastava as Shekhar's father, Ratan Lal Dwivedi
- Vibha Chibber as Shekhar's mother, Madhuvanti Dwivedi
- Saad Bilgrami as Shekhar's younger brother, Sanju Dwivedi
- Anushka Kaushik as Shekhar's younger sister, Suruchi Dwivedi
- Ajitesh Gupta as Shekhar's friend, Darshan Bafna
- Gyanendra Tripathi as a cafe owner and Shekhar's mentor, Manish
- Akanksha Thakur as Shekhar's love interest, Riddhima
- Ahmad Harhash as Raj Singh Balwant friend, Darahan Bafna

== Episodes ==
Series	Episodes	Originally released
1	06	22 July 2022

=== Season 1 (2022) ===
No. overall	No. in season	Title	Directed by	Written by	Original release date
1	1	"Termination"	Ruchir Arun	Tatsat Pandey; Bharat Mishra	22 July 2022
Shekhar is laid off from his job and forced to move back to his hometown. He reconnects with his friends after two years, which leads to some shocking revelation.
2	2	"We’ll get back to you"	Ruchir Arun	Tatsat Pandey; Bharat Mishra	22 July 2022
To distract himself from his slump, Shekhar helps his father to discover Sanju's shenanigans and Suruchi's secrets. In between his problems, he finds solace in a long-lost friend.
3	3	"Work-Life Balance"	Ruchir Arun	Tatsat Pandey; Bharat Mishra	22 July 2022
Shekhar is shocked to learn about the latest developments in the family business and tries hard to stem the seemingly inevitable tide. Meanwhile, all is not well in Sanju's world.
4	4	"Main Kachra Hoon"	Ruchir Arun	Tatsat Pandey; Bharat Mishra	22 July 2022
Shekhar has to find a way to mend few broken hearts. Although he has another shot at his dream job, he has to make a tough choice for a loved one.
5	5	"Lay Off"	Ruchir Arun	Tatsat Pandey; Bharat Mishra	22 July 2022
Despite a business loss, Shekhar sows the seeds of hope in the Dwivedi family. With Sanju turning over a new leaf and Suruchi's secret still hidden, it's all sunny until it's not.
6	6	"Success"	Ruchir Arun	Tatsat Pandey; Bharat Mishra	22 July 2022
Although Shekhar has found a path to lead his dream life, something seems amiss. On the flip side, strife erupts between the Dwivedis. Can they find their 'happily ever after'?

== Reception ==
=== Critical response ===
Pratik Sur from Outlook India said, "The emotional connection that ‘Ghar Waapsi’ manages to bring forth is fantastic. It's this relatability in every young adult's life that audiences would be able to relate to. Leaving aside the technical glitches in the timelines, this Vishal Vashishtha show is definitely a Breezy Weekend Watch. I am going with 3.5 stars." Arushi Jain from Indian Express said, "It is a show that will bring you home or will make you take a break from your humdrum work schedule and sit with your parents and siblings for a little gupshup or maybe a game of Ludo."

Sreeju Sudhakaran from Latestly said, "There are certain movies and show where you start watching as an evaluator but end up being their joyful, smitten fan, looking desperate for the next person to share your opinion on the same.

Grace Cyril of India Today stated, "The performances in the series are all noteworthy" and "Ghar Waapsi's relatability in today’s times is what will touch your hearts.".
