= ISRO: A Personal History =

- ISRO: A Personal History
- Language: English
- Genre: Science
- Publisher: HarperCollins
- Publication date: February 2017
- Publication place: India
- Pages: 256
- ISBN: 9789352643639

ISRO: A Personal History by R. Aravamudan—a veteran of ISRO—and Gita Aravamudan—his spouse—is a personal historical account of the history of Indian Space Research Organization. "Overall, the book is a nice exposition of the space programme and provides an insight into the ‘ISRO Way’ of executing large and technologically challenging projects," wrote The Outlook Magazine in its review of the book.

== Summary ==
The book starts off in Trombay, where R. Aravamudan was working in 1962 and takes the reader through the TERLS, the various ISRO 'eras' in his own words—led by Vikram Sarabhai, Satish Dhawan, Udupi Ramachandra Rao—all the way till the Geosynchronous Satellite Launch Vehicle story.

== Adaptation ==
A television series, titled Rocket Science, based on the novel was being developed by Invar Studios as of February 2019.
