= Filmfare OTT Awards =

Annual Indian media awards

- Current: 2025 Filmfare OTT Awards
- Awarded for: Excellence in OTT content
- Country: India
- Presented by: Filmfare
- First award: 19 December 2020
- Final award: present
- Website: http://www.filmfare.com
- Related: Filmfare Awards

The Filmfare OTT Awards are annual awards that honour artistic and technical excellence in the Hindi-language original programming over-the-top space. The first edition of the awards were held on 19 December 2020.

== Categories ==
As of 2020, Filmfare OTT Awards have 32 categories.

=== Popular Awards ===
- Best Drama Series
- Best Director Series

=== Critics' Choice Awards ===
- Best Series (Critics)
- Best Director (Critics)
- Best Actor in a Drama Series (Critics)
- Best Actress in a Drama Series (Critics)
- Best Actor in a Comedy Series (Critics)
- Best Actress in a Comedy Series (Critics)

=== Writing Awards ===
- Best Screenplay (Series)
- Best Dialogue
- Best Original Story (Series)

=== Music Awards ===
- Best Background Music (Series)
- Best Original Soundtrack (Series)

=== Technical awards ===
- Best Cinematography (Series)
- Best Art-Direction (Series)
- Best Editing (Series)
- Best Costume Design (Series)

In 2021 another award was introduced:

- Best VFX

== Editions ==
=== 2020 ===
The 2020 edition of OTT awards were held on 19 December 2020 in Mumbai. It considered series released between 1 August 2019 and 31 July 2020, for the awards.

=== 2021 ===
The 2021 edition of awards show was held on 9 December 2021 in Mumbai. Nominations were announced by Filmfare on 2 December 2021.

=== 2022 ===
The 2022 edition of awards show was held on 21 December 2022 in Mumbai. Nominations were announced by Filmfare on 17 December 2022.

=== 2023 ===
The 2023 edition of awards show was held on 26 November 2023 in Mumbai. Nominations were announced by Filmfare on 22 November 2023.

=== 2024 ===
The 2024 edition of awards show was held on 28 November 2024 in Mumbai. Nominations were announced by Filmfare on 1 December 2024.

== See also ==
- Filmfare Awards
- Over-the-top media service in India
