= Kota Factory =

2019 Indian Hindi-language web series

- Official release poster
- Genre: Comedy drama
- Created by: Saurabh Khanna; Tamojit Das
- Directed by: Raghav Subbu; Pratish Mehta
- Starring: Mayur More; Ranjan Raj; Alam Khan; Jitendra Kumar; Revathi Pillai; Urvi Singh; Ahsaas Channa
- Composers: Karthik Rao; Simran Hora
- Country of origin: India
- Original language: Hindi
- No. of seasons: 3
- No. of episodes: 15

Production
- Executive producer: Sameer Saxena
- Cinematography: Jerin Paul
- Editor: Gourav Gopal Jha
- Running time: 30–45 minutes
- Production company: The Viral Fever

Original release
- Network: TVFPlay; YouTube
- Release: 16 April – 14 May 2019
- Network: Netflix
- Release: 24 September 2021 – 20 June 2024

Kota Factory is an Indian Hindi-language television series created by Saurabh Khanna, directed by Raghav Subbu and produced by Arunabh Kumar for The Viral Fever. The story is set in Kota, Rajasthan, an educational hub famous for its coaching centres. The show follows the life of 16-year-old Vaibhav (Mayur More) who moves to Kota from Itarsi. It shows the life of students in the city, and Vaibhav's efforts to get into an Indian Institute of Technology (IIT) by cracking the Joint Entrance Examination. It also stars Jitendra Kumar, Ahsaas Channa, Alam Khan, Ranjan Raj, Revathi Pillai, Priyanshu Raj and Urvi Singh in prominent roles.

Saurabh Khanna, the creator of the show, said that he aims to change the popular narrative surrounding Kota and preparation for IIT-JEE & NEET in Indian pop culture to a more positive one via the show. The series premiered simultaneously on TVFPlay and YouTube from 16 April to 14 May 2019. The series received a generally positive response from critics, praising its black & white setting, realism, and the major technical aspects of the series.

On 30 August 2021, Netflix announced that the series would be renewed for a second season, which was released on 24 September 2021. On 26 September 2021, Raghav Subbu confirmed that the third season was in the works. It was confirmed in Feb 2024 when Netflix dropped a first look teaser on their Instagram page. It was released on 20 June 2024.

== Cast ==
=== Main ===
- Mayur More as Vaibhav Pandey
- Ranjan Raj as Balmukund Meena
- Alam Khan as Uday Gupta
- Jitendra Kumar as Jeetu Bhaiya, Founder of AIMERS Institute
- Ahsaas Channa as Shivangi Ranawat
- Revathi Pillai as Vartika Ratawal
- Urvi Singh as Meenal Parekh

=== Recurring cast ===
- Naveen Kasturia as Dhruv
- Vipul Singh as Mahesh (interviewer)
- Rohit Sukhwani as Rohit
- Arun Kumar as Deepak
- Harish Peddinti as Bablu, CEO of AIMERS
- Sanyam Bafna as Aayush
- Loveleen Mishra as PG Aunty
- Jasmeet Singh Bhatia as Parminder sir
- Shivankit Singh Parihar as Awasthi sir
- Gaurav Mishra as Batla sir
- Visshesh Tiwari as Piyush
- Jyoti Gauba as Vaibhav's mother
- Amitabh Krishna Ghanekar as Vaibhav's father
- Saurabh Khanna as Vice Principal Mehta, Modern Heart School
- Deepak Kumar Mishra as Autowala
- Sameer Saxena as Maheshwari sir
- Vaibhav Thakkar as Shushrut Patel
- Abhaya Sharma as Vernali
- Rajesh Kumar as Gagan Rastogi
- Tillotama Shome as Pooja Aggarwal

== Episodes ==
=== Series overview ===
Overview of Kota Factory seasons
Series	Episodes	Originally released		
Series	Episodes	First released	Last released	Network
1	5	16 April 2019	14 May 2019	TVFPlay; YouTube
2	5	24 September 2021		Netflix
3	5	20 June 2024		Netflix

=== Season 1 (2019) ===
No. overall	No. in season	Title	Directed by	Written by	Original release date	Viewers (millions)
1	1	"Inventory"	Raghav Subbu	Abhishek Yadav	16 April 2019	58
Vaibhav joins Prodigy classes in Kota mid-academic year, assigned to the struggling A10 batch after Maheshwari classes reject him. At his homestay, Meena advises against joining A10. Vaibhav appeals to Deepak, Prodigy's Head Manager, but is denied a batch transfer. Determined, Vaibhav meets Jeetu Bhaiya, Physics lecturer, who gives him a 50-question challenge to complete overnight. With Meena and Uday's help, Vaibhav solves 42 questions by copying solutions. However, he struggles with the remaining 8. The next day, Jeetu Bhaiya exposes Vaibhav's cheating, but impressed by his effort, offers a second chance. Despite the infraction, Jeetu Bhaiya promotes Vaibhav to the elite A5 batch, recognising his hard work and potential.
2	2	"Assembly Line"	Raghav Subbu	Saurabh Khanna & Abhishek Yadav	23 April 2019	36
Vaibhav struggles to sleep, eat food at mess, drink water (which he finds salty) and study for long hours at Kota. Uday and Meena try to help their new friend but all in vain. One day, Jeetu Bhaiya acknowledges about his problems and helps him with the solutions. Eventually, within 21 days, Vaibhav has all the struggles sorted with all the help he has.
3	3	"Optimization"	Raghav Subbu	Abhishek Yadav & Sandeep Jain	30 April 2019	41
Vaibhav is not able to cope up with Inorganic Chemistry and blames the teachers who teach the subject. But even after changing 3 teachers for the subject, he bursts out all his anger and frustration in front of Meena, who then takes him to Jeetu Bhaiya. He advises Vaibhav to drop the subject.
4	4	"Shutdown"	Raghav Subbu	Saurabh Khanna, Abhishek Yadav	7 May 2019	36
Jeetu Bhaiya advises students to take a break from JEE studies and attend school practicals. Uday plans to explore Kota with Shivangi and invites Vaibhav and Vartika. Meena, initially planning to study with Vaibhav, changes his mind and joins Uday's outing instead. Vaibhav and Vartika study together, developing unspoken feelings. To be closer to Vartika, Vaibhav takes the Maheshwari exam, despite his reservations. They study together for 12th-grade exams. Meanwhile, Meena realises wandering Kota was pointless, developing feelings for Meenal. However, she reveals plans to move to the US, leaving Meena regretful for neglecting studies.
5	5	"Overhaul (Season Finale)"	Raghav Subbu	Abhishek Yadav	14 May 2019	34
Vaibhav is surprised to be selected for Maheshwari classes. Deepak, Batla Sir, and Jeetu Bhaiya address the selected students, including Vaibhav. Initially, Vaibhav refuses, having settled into Prodigy. However, Jeetu Bhaiya convinces him to join Maheshwari for its larger student body and better focus. Vaibhav consults his parents, following Uday's advice, and decides to make the switch. Bidding farewell to friends Shivangi, Meena, Uday, and Vartika, Uday drops him off at Maheshwari. Vaibhav is allotted to A3, where he meets Sushrut, a nervous student from A7.

=== Season 2 (2021) ===
No. overall	No. in season	Title	Directed by	Written by	Original release date
6	1	"Reasoning"	Raghav Subbu	Abhishesk Yadav, Saurabh Khanna	24 September 2021
Vaibhav prepares for his first day at Maheshwari classes, accompanied by his new friend Sushrut. During their journey, they notice a billboard featuring Jeetu Bhaiya. At the orientation, Mr. Maheshwari gives a demoralising introduction, followed by an oath. The Physics class is unengaging, with the teacher simply writing on the whiteboard while students mindlessly copy it down. Meanwhile, at Prodigy classes, Vaibhav's former friends learn that Jeetu Bhaiya has left the institute. Concerned about Sushrut's well-being, Vaibhav discovers that his friend is depressed and questioning the importance of appearing for the JEE exam. They seek help from other seniors and realise that many others share similar concerns. When they meet Jeetu, who is focused on building his own institute, Vaibhav's friends address Sushrut's concerns to him.
7	2	"Control System"	Raghav Subbu	Puneet Batra, Saurabh Khanna	24 September 2021
In Jeetu's class, Meena is absent, and Vaibhav finds his Chemistry class at Maheshwari engaging. Jeetu discusses concerns about the teaching abilities of the Physics faculty at Maheshwari, despite their qualifications. Vaibhav tries to attend Jeetu's classes during the day but is stopped by the guard. He convinces his Physics teacher to excuse him from attending the class. Jeetu secures funding for his institute from an old friend who is an investor. Shivangi addresses Meena's issues with females, introduces him to masturbation, and encourages Vaibhav to confront Mr. Maheshwari about his Physics class. Instead, he attempts bribing the security guard, Vaibhav ends up meeting with Mr. Maheshwari. Meena develops an addiction to masturbation and feels guilt and shame, and Jeetu Bhaiya helps him address it. Finally, Mr. Maheshwari allows Vaibhav to attend Jeetu's classes.
8	3	"Atmospheric Pressure"	Raghav Subbu	Manoj Kalwani, Saurabh Khanna	24 September 2021
At Maheshwari, many other students are now raising concerns about teaching abilities of the Physics Faculty. Jeetu hires a female teacher for teaching Chemistry, Mrs. Sarika. On facing difficulty to find a good maths teacher, Jeetu approaches Agarwal sir. Jeetu told him his problems. He suggested Gagan Rastogi (who teaches in Maheshwari Classes) for maths. Gagan sir told Jeetu his conditions to join the AIMERs and to make a contract bond for 2 years. Jeetu hesitates. Maheshwari sir approaches Jeetu to join Maheshwari classes, but he declined, as he made up his mind to start his own institute. Finally, Jeetu finalizes Gagan sir for teaching maths at AIMERS.
9	4	"Repair & Maintenance"	Raghav Subbu	Puneet Batra, Saurabh Khanna	24 September 2021
When a bout of jaundice slows Vaibhav down in his studying, Jeetu insists he calls his only hope to get well quickly: his mother. he recovers from Jaundice after some days but couldn't focus on study due to frequent interactions with his mother. Jeetu insists him to send her back. Vaibhav hesitates, but Jeetu encourages him to do. When he reaches his room, he is still hesitant, but he sees that his mother is preparing to go back home, since his younger brother has boards exams. Vaibhav relaxed and gave her goodbye.
10	5	"Packaging"	Raghav Subbu	Saurabh Khanna	24 September 2021
JEE results send Kota, especially Maheswari Classes, into celebration mode as the AIR 1 is from their institute. Prodigy gets highest rank around 100, Deepak asked his friend to get one student from top 50 ranks, for marketing of his institute. This celebration gives Vaibhav, Meena and Uday glimpses into their own futures. But the occasion comes with sad truths knowing they took more time to solve only class 11 questions. Sarika mam leaves AIMERS claiming to Jeetu for some personal issues, but Jeetu refused to talk to her when she tried to contact him again to reason him. Later, Gagan sir told Jeetu that she has joined Maheshwari, so he should have made that contract bond. Jeetu starts celebrating with his students, who couldn't make it to JEE Advanced, encouraging and motivating them. While celebrating, his colleague and CEO of AIMERS, Bablu informs Jeetu about suicide of his student, Varnali, which makes him extremely sad.

=== Season 3 (2024) ===
No. overall	No. in season	Title	Directed by	Written by	Original release date
11	1	"Mission Statement"	Pratish Mehta	Puneet Batra and Pravin Yadav	20 June 2024
Jeetu struggles to cope with the loss of a student to suicide. Vaibhav doubts his own path to success when everyone else starts celebrating his cricket-playing cousin getting selected to IPL.
12	2	"Fault Mitigation"	Pratish Mehta	Puneet Batra and Mahesh Chandwani	20 June 2024
Facing financial stress, Meena begins tutoring an eager student to earn extra cash. Vaibhav's attitude forces Vartika to find a new study partner and causes them to study separately.
13	3	"Benchmarking"	Pratish Mehta	Puneet Batra and Nikita Lalwani	20 June 2024
A clash with Gagan causes Jeetu to spiral. Shivangi feels the strain of the NEET preparation, while Vaibhav and Meena compete for ranks in a test series.
14	4	"Emergency Response"	Pratish Mehta	Puneet Batra and Mahesh Chandwani	20 June 2024
Jeetu receives an offer that affects the future of Aimers. Uday’s error in judgement leads to serious trouble. Exam pressure takes its toll on Vaibhav.
15	5	"Product Delivery"	Pratish Mehta	Puneet Batra and Pravin Yadav	20 June 2024
Prayers and prep take hold as the final countdown to the exam approaches. Jeetu makes a startling announcement to his students.

== Production ==
=== Development ===
The screenwriter Saurabh Khanna who worked on The Viral Fever's Yeh Meri Family, started the scriptwriting process of his another project for TVF, after the release of Yeh Meri Family in July 2018. It was reported that the series is based on a teenager who joins a coaching institute that prepares students for the Indian Institute of Technology entrance examination (JEE Advanced), and deals with intense academic pressure and a colourful hostel experience. While Khanna compared the script of the series to Biswa Kalyan Rath's Laakhon Mein Ek, a similar web show released in late 2017, and a documentary An Engineered Dream, by Hemant Gaba, Khanna stated that the script is distinctively different from both the works as this show is set in India's coaching hub of Kota in Rajasthan.

"The popular narrative surrounding Kota and IIT preparation in Indian pop culture is that parents torment their children by pushing them through the process and it’s a one-sided representation. It’s not like everyone is in Kota with a passion other than clearing the exam. There are also studious kids, but people who study aren’t celebrated in the country. We make films on mavericks, but never something like A Beautiful Mind. We have developed this tendency to portray people who study and get nine-to-five jobs as these drones whose passions have been sucked away. It’s like there’s not a story in their life unless they quit their jobs and climb the Himalayas."

— Saurabh Khanna in an interview with the Scroll.in about the scripting of Kota Factory.

=== Casting ===
Khanna drew the inspiration of the series as he and the creative team of TVF (Arunabh Kumar, Amit Golani, and Biswapati Sarkar) were IIT graduates. The series star Jitendra Kumar in a principal character as Jeetu Bhaiya, as like all the TVF series and sketches featuring Kumar. He was also an ex-IIT graduate studied in Kota, and his experience made them easier for him to work in the series. Khanna stated about his role, adding that, "Teaching is a very humble, underrated profession, where those who practice it are not that high up on the social ladder. That's not how it is in Kota. Teachers are heavily paid and they are, consequently, under pressure to extract the best from students. Jeetu is one such teacher, a well-to-do guy with a taste for fine things in life. He is a motivator, a friend, a guide, students' 'agony aunt' and does not do lip service to make a student feel good. When Vaibhav requests to be allowed to move up to the elite students’ batch, Jeetu snaps at him to not beg." One of the characters Uday, is played by Alam Khan, who also appeared in Laakhon Mein Ek, having the similar storyline and role as of Kota Factory, but Khanna conveyed it as unintentional.

=== Filming ===
Kota Factory was shot in colour and graded into monochrome later during post production (black-and-white). The shooting was kickstarted in January 2019 and ended within 30 days. After the announcement of the series' second season being renewed, the makers started their works of writing in July 2019. The team initially planned to shoot the series in March 2020, but the shooting was delayed indefinitely due to the COVID-19 pandemic lockdown in India. The makers later started the shooting process in September 2020, and was filmed across two to three months in and around Madhya Pradesh. The crew shot the series under the supervision of a special team designated as in order to observe the crew members abiding the COVID-19 protocol. In January 2021, the makers announced that the shooting of the series had been wrapped.

== Soundtrack ==
=== Season 1 ===
The first season's soundtrack is composed by Karthik Rao and Simran Hora, and was produced by Ankur Tewari. It features twelve original compositions with two songs "The Gentleman" sung and written by Simran Hora and "Main Bola Hey!" sung by Abhishek Yadav, Manish Chandwani and Karthik Rao. The soundtrack album was released on 23 May 2019, through media streaming platforms and in YouTube through the official channel of TVF, where the songs are independently released without launching a separate jukebox format. In addition to the original soundtrack, Kota Factory also features two songs composed by Ankur Tewari, Karsh Kale and his rock band The Ghalat Family, whereas the songs were written by Ankur Tewari. The songs were released as a part of the additional soundtrack released on 3 June 2019.

Kota Factory: Season 1 (Music from Tvf Original Series)

Soundtrack album by Karthik Rao, Simran Hora
- Released: 23 May 2019
- Recorded: 2018–2019
- Genre: Soundtrack
- Length: 25:01
- Language: Hindi
- Label: Contagious Online Media Network Pvt Ltd
- Producer: Ankur Tewari

Kota Factory: Season 1 (Music from Tvf Original Series)
No.	Title	Music	Singer(s)	Length
1.	"The Gentleman"	Simran Hora	Simran Hora	02:50
2.	"Main Bola Hey!"	Karthik Rao	Abhishek Yadav, Manish Chandwani, Karthik Rao	02:33
3.	"Nostalgia"	Karthik Rao	Instrumental	03:18
4.	"Jeetu Bhaiya"	Karthik Rao	Instrumental	01:07
5.	"Against the Flow"	Simran Hora	Instrumental	01:28
6.	"Hero's Journey"	Karthik Rao	Instrumental	03:05
7.	"21 Days"	Simran Hora	Instrumental	01:36
8.	"With the Flow"	Simran Hora	Instrumental	00:58
9.	"Practical Love"	Karthik Rao	Instrumental	01:52
10.	"Hi Gili Gili"	Karthik Rao	Simran Hora	00:50
11.	"Truth"	Simran Hora	Instrumental	02:15
12.	"The Dark Side of the Gentleman"	Simran Hora	Instrumental	03:09
Total length:				25:01

Kota Factory (Additional Soundtrack)
No.	Title	Music	Singer(s)	Length
1.	"Yaaron"	Ankur Tewari	Ankur Tewari	04:12
2.	"Mohabbat Zindabad"	Karsh Kale, The Ghalat Family	Ankur Tewari	03:29
Total length:				32:42

=== Season 2 ===
The second season's soundtrack is also composed by Karthik Rao and Simran Hora. It features nine original compositions with two songs "Tere Jaisa" sung by Vaibhav Bundhoo and Kamakshi Khanna and "Umbilical" sung by Jazim Sharma and written by Alok Ranjan Srivastava. The soundtrack album was released on 24 September 2021.

Kota Factory: Season 2 (Music from the Netflix Series)

Soundtrack album by Karthik Rao, Simran Hora
- Released: 24 September 2021
- Recorded: 2021
- Genre: Soundtrack
- Language: Hindi
- Label: Contagious Online Media Network Pvt Ltd

Kota Factory: Season 2 (Music from the Netflix Series)
No.	Title	Lyrics	Music	Singer(s)	Length
1.	"All India Rank 1"		Karthik Rao, Arpit Mehta, Simran Hora	Instrumental	02:12
2.	"21 Days Later"		Simran Hora	Instrumental	02:42
3.	"Pasara Pasara"		Simran Hora	Instrumental	00:43
4.	"Noire"		Simran Hora	Instrumental	02:38
5.	"Tere Jaisa"	Vaibhav Bundhoo	Vaibhav Bundhoo	Vaibhav Bundhoo, Kamakshi Khanna	05:11
6.	"The Gentleman (Orchestral)"		Simran Hora	Instrumental	02:48
7.	"Umbilical"	Alok Ranjan Srivastava	Simran Hora	Jazim Sharma	02:43
8.	"All India Rank 2"		Karthik Rao, Arpit Mehta, Simran Hora	Instrumental	02:12
9.	"The Gentleman (Rock)"		Simran Hora	Instrumental	02:22
Total length:					23:31

== Themes ==
Kota Factory drew inspiration from the life of aspiring engineering students, who join the coaching institute in Kota, to crack the IIT entrance exam. This plot has been found similar to the 2009 film 3 Idiots, the web series Laakhon Mein Ek and the docu-drama An Engineer's Dream. But, Tanul Thakur of the British magazine The Wire, deploys the realistic portrayals of the series as compared to the feature films based on the same theme. Thakur stated that the first half of the series is interesting due to the "intellectual curiosity about the city, and its people". He added that apart from the realistic portrayals, it also added the acceptance to abnormalities in the coaching life, as instead of critiquing the coaching institute. The series also has the theme of how the life of a student in Kota goes. It tells about the hardships of a student.

== Release ==
Kota Factory sponsored with Unacademy in order to promote the series, based on its storyline. In December 2018, TVF released the official teaser through its YouTube channel which received wide response from audiences. Later, the official trailer of the first season was unveiled on 28 March 2019. The series consisting of five episodes was released simultaneously through TVF Play and YouTube from 16 April 2019, with each episode being aired per week. The series finale premiered on 14 May 2019.

After the second season being renewed Netflix acquired the distribution rights of the series; an official announcement regarding Season 2 was made on 3 March 2021, where Netflix released several other original contents in their 2021 slate. This marked TVF's second collaboration with the platform after Yeh Meri Family. On 30 August 2021, Netflix announced that the second season of the series will premiere on 24 September 2021.

On 26 September 2021, Raghav Subbu confirmed that the third season was in the works. It was confirmed in Feb 2024 when Netflix dropped a first look teaser on their Instagram page. It was released on 20 June 2024.

== Reception ==
Devasheesh Pandey of News18 praised the cinematography, art direction, sound design as well as the acting performances of the show and gave it a rating of 3.5 out of 5 saying that, "Kota Factory maintains an edge over other shows in the genre, courtesy of its on-point, deadpan humour and a relatably bittersweet aftertaste of existential battle that the protagonist is facing." Ishita Sengupta of The Indian Express found the show to be engaging and applauded it saying that, "The ingenuity of Kota Factory lies in its ability to deal with different narrative strands and coalesce them effortlessly." Ishita also felt that the performances of the actors, specially Mayur More and Ranjan Raj, add a lot of value to the show. Rahul Desai of Film Companion was impressed with the mature depiction of the subject at hand and praised the acting performances as well as the writing of the show saying that, "Kota Factory’s biggest asset is its writing which somehow maintains a semi-dramatic progression without compromising on the factual tone of the series."

Gautam Batra of Koimoi praised the direction and the acting performances of the show and gave it a rating of 4 out of 5 saying that, "the web series has taken a very less dramatic route to narrate the story which makes it extremely relatable watch." Priyanka Bansal of The Quint praised the show for presenting a fresh perspective on the education system in India. Impressed with the acting performances, production quality and music of Kota Factory, Priyanka gave the show a rating of 3.5 out of 5 and said that, "If you are looking for something worthwhile, The Kota Factory can be a nice watch that will make you think not about death and gloom but leave you with optimism." Tanul Thakur of The Wire praised the show for being realistic and relatable but felt that the show shies away from criticising the culture of coaching institutes prevalent in the Indian society. Dilip D'Souza writing for The Caravan praised the storytelling, as well.
