= Kanikka Kapur =

Indian actress (born 1995)

- Born: New Delhi, India
- Education: Journalism and public communication degree from Delhi University
- Occupations: Model, actress
- Years active: 2008–present

Kanikka Kapur is an Indian actress and model known for her work in television, films, and web series. She made a television debut as Suman Tiwari in Ek Duje Ke Vaaste 2 opposite Mohit Kumar produced by SonyTV and Bollywood debut in Dono (2023), produced by Rajshri Productions and Jio Studios.

She also known for ImMature and Tippu. She began her career in modeling and went on to win multiple beauty pageants, including Miss Asia 2015. Over the years, she has worked across different entertainment platforms, including television, films, and digital content.

== Career ==
Kapur passion for acting began at an early age, leading her to work in short films when she was just 13. She was also actively involved in theatre performances during her student years.

At the age of 18, she started her modeling career and quickly gained recognition, winning several pageants such as Miss Mood Indigo (2013), Femina Style Diva North (2014), and Manappuram Miss Queen of India (2015). Her biggest achievement in the pageant industry came in 2015 when she was crowned Miss Asia at Le Méridien, Kochi, winning a cash prize of ₹500,000.

Kanikka made her acting debut in 2015 with the Telugu film Tippu, where she played the role of Vaishnavi. In 2018, she participated in the reality TV competition India's Next Superstars, where she performed in front of renowned filmmakers Rohit Shetty and Karan Johar.

She later appeared in the Hindi film A Gift of Love: Sifar (2019) and the music video for Noor (2019).

Her television debut came in 2020 when she starred opposite Mohit Kumar in the drama series Ek Duje Ke Vaaste 2, where she played the lead role of Suman Tiwari. The show earned her widespread recognition and established her presence in the television industry.

Alongside TV, she has been part of popular web series such as ImMature (2019), Date with Senior Office Romance (2022), The Great Indian Stud (2022), and Modern Parivaar (Diwali Special) (2021).

Apart from films and television, Kanikka Kapur has also appeared in several music videos, showcasing her versatility as an actress. She featured in Noor, Aankhon Ke Darmiya, Itne Tum Zaroori Ho, Tujhe Dekha, Khabar, Krishna Sang Radha, and BEGANA.

In addition to acting, Kanikka has featured in several commercials for major brands like Samsung and Rexona.

In 2023, Kanikka made her Bollywood debut in Dono, produced by Rajshri Productions and Jio Studios. The film marked a significant step in her career, bringing her into mainstream Hindi cinema.

Most recently, she appeared opposite Mohit Kumar in the short web series Wrong Number Reboot, further expanding her presence in the digital space.

in March to May 2026, Kanikka made her TV comeback after 5 years by playing Taara Shekrawat in Starplus's "Taara" opposite Krushal Ahuja it ended in 7 may 2026 due to low TRP ratings.

== Filmography ==
=== Television ===
Year	Serial	Role	Notes	Ref
2018	India's Next Superstars	Contestant		
2020–2021	Ek Duje Ke Vaaste 2	Major Suman Tiwari	Debut Show; Lead Role	
2026	Kyunki Saas Bhi Kabhi Bahu Thi 2	Taara	Guest	
2026	Taara	Taara Shekhawat	Lead Role	

=== Films ===
Year	Film	Role	Language	Ref.
2015	Tippu	Vaishnavi	Telugu	
2019	A Gift of Love: Sifar	Ayesha	Hindi	
2023	Dono	Alina Jaisingh Kothari	Hindi	
2025	Murderbaad	Isabelle Sharma	Hindi	
2026	Batwara 1947	Nishat	Hindi	
2026	Meethe Mein Kya Hai	Tara	Hindi	

=== Webseries ===
Year	Webseries	Role	Platform	Ref.
2021	When You Invite Your Girlfriend on Diwali	Anshuka	YouTube	
2022	Date with Senior	Ruhi	YouTube	
2022	When Make Out Goes Wrong	Suhani	YouTube	
2023	Immature Season 2	Chaaya	Prime Video	
2022	The Diwali Proposal	Shweta	YouTube	
2022	Sarkari Shaadi	Neha	YouTube	
2023	When English Medium & Hindi Medium Are Neighbours	Aadhya	YouTube	
2023	Immature Season 3	Chaaya	Prime Video	
2024	When Doctor & Dentist are Neighbours	Riddhima	YouTube	
2024	North Indian & South Indian Are Colleagues	Shraddha	YouTube	
2024	When Alpha Male & Feminist Girl Are Neighbours	Samran	YouTube	
2024	Wrong Number Reboot	Adhira	YouTube	

=== Music Videos ===
Year	Title	Artist	Ref.
2019	Noor	Ahmad Shaad Safwi	
2020	Aankhon Ke Darmiya	Rishbh Tiwari	
2021	Itne Tum Zaroorii Ho	Deepp C	
2021	Tujhe Dekha	Nayan Shankar	
2022	Khabar	Twin Strings	
2023	Krishna Sang Radha	Hansika Pareek	
2025	BEGANA	Raghav Chaitanya	
2025	Fitratein	Arijit Singh	

== Awards ==
Event	Date
Miss Mood Indigo	2013
Femina Style Diva North	2014
Manappuram Miss Queen of India	2015
Miss Asia	2015
