= Nidhi Bisht =

Indian actress, casting director, and filmmaker

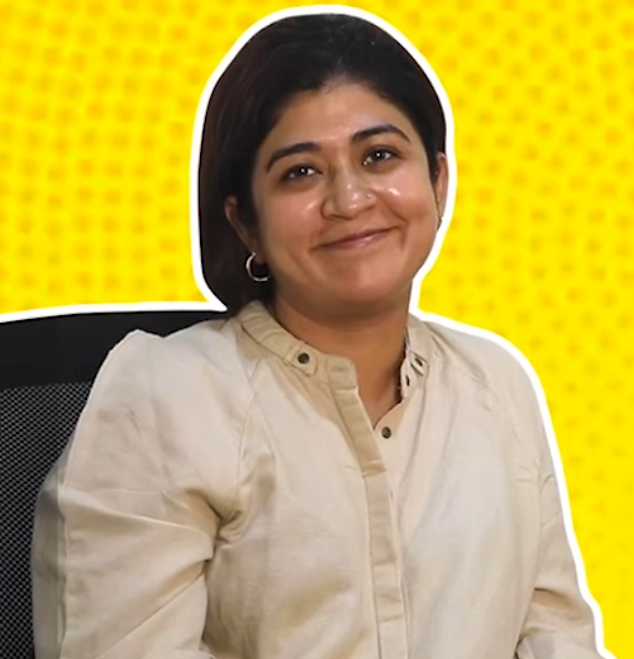
- Born: 21 October 1985 (age 40); India
- Education: Jamia Millia Islamia
- Occupations: Actress; filmmaker; lawyer
- Years active: 2009–present
- Known for: Entertainment

Nidhi Bisht (born 21 October 1985) is an Indian actress, filmmaker and lawyer. She is one of the earliest members of The Viral Fever. She worked with TVF (2013-2020) as a Creative Director and later as Creative Head for Girliyapa (2017-2020).

== Biography ==
Bisht studied at Delhi Police Public School and pursued LLB from Jamia Millia Islamia. After graduating, she began working at an IPR law firm. She practiced law at Delhi High Court for a year. In 2009 she gave up her job and decided to build a career in the entertainment arena. She acted in various plays like The City of Djinns, Chainpur ki Dastan, Shit Happens, once upon a Tiger, Dirty Talk, Holi, Shakespeare, Who, Ok Tata Bye among others.

She joined The Viral Fever in 2013. She is lone non IIT graduate in The Viral Fever.

Bisht acted in Chai Sutta Chronicles in 2013. She acted in Permanent Roommates in 2014. She acted in Umrika in 2015. She acted in Phillauri in 2017 with Anushka Sharma, Suraj Sharma and Diljit Dosanjh. She acted in Bisht, please! in 2017, a show about the misadventures of a good girl that she wrote with Biswapati Sarkar and Devanshi S. She acted in Bachelors. She acted in Kanika in 2018 which was a short film. She also acted in web series like TVF Tripling, ImMature and The Making of…. Her film Dream Girl was released on 13 September 2019 and was a blockbuster hit. Nidhi also played the role of Megha Asthana in the TVF original web series 'Cubicles' which was released in December 2019.

Bisht also involved in writing in Permanent Roommates (2016), PA-Gals (2017) and Bisht, please! (2017). She also worked as director in PA-Gals. She worked as casting director of TVF Pitchers and assistant director of Permanent Roommates.

== Filmography ==
Year	Film	Writer	Casting director	Director	Assistant PRP
2015	TVF Pitchers		Yes		
2016	Permanent Roommates	Yes			Yes
2017	Bisht, Please!	Yes			
2017	PA-Gals	Yes		Yes	
2022	Home Shanti	Yes			
2022	Phone Bhoot	Yes			

=== Actress ===
Year	Film	Role	Notes
2013	Thuppakki	Kidnapped girl	Tamil
2013	Chai Sutta Chronicles	Ipsa	Web series
2014	Permanent Roommates	Ritu	The Viral Fever
2015	Umrika	Pinky	
2016–19	TVF Tripling	Nirmala/Bhabhisha	The Viral Fever
2017	Phillauri	Amrit	
2017	Bisht, Please!	Neetu Bisht/Neetu	Web series
2017–18	Bachelors	Chewingami	The Viral Fever
2018	The Making Of...	Jamia Roy Sengupta, Argentina and Ekthi Kapoor	Web series
2018	Kanika	Mahima, a police officer	Short film
2019	ImMature	Aishwarya Miss	Amazon Prime Video
2019	Dream Girl	Roma	Hindi movie
2019	Hostel Daze	Chemistry lab assistant	Amazon Prime Video
2019–2022	Cubicles	Team lead - Megha Asthana	The Viral Fever
2020	Mr. & Mrs.	Madhu	Web series
2022	Home Shanti	SDM Aruna Tripathi	Web series
2022	Phone Bhoot	Lady Daayana	Hindi movie
2024-Present	Maamla Legal Hai	Sujata Negi	Netflix
