= Home Shanti =

2022 Indian comedy-drama web television series

- Official Release Poster
- Genre: Comedy Drama
- Story by: Nidhi Bisht; Akshay Asthana; Akanksha Dua; Mayank Pandey; Nikhil Sachan; Saurabh Khanna
- Directed by: Akanksha Dua
- Starring: Manoj Pahwa; Supriya Pathak; Chakori Dwivedi; Poojan Chhabra; Happy Ranajit
- Country of origin: India
- Original language: Hindi
- No. of seasons: 1

Production
- Executive producer: Sameer Saxena
- Producers: Amit Gilani; Biswapati Sarkar; Sameer Saxena; Saurabh Khanna
- Cinematography: Dhirendra Shukla
- Editor: Ashutosh Matela
- Camera setup: Multi-camera
- Production company: Posham Pa Pictures

Original release
- Network: Disney+ Hotstar

Home Shanti is an Indian Hindi-language family comedy drama series written and directed by Akanksha Dua. The series premiered on 6 May 2022 on Disney+ Hotstar. It stars Supriya Pathak, Manoj Pahwa, Chakori Dwivedi and Poojan Chhabra.

== Plot ==
A middle class Joshi family wants to build a house of their own in Dehradun area. The series talks about the ups and downs the family faces during the construction of their dream house.

== Reception ==
Reviewers praised the acting of Manoj Pahwa and Supriya Pathak, and called the series as a whole "relatable and mildly amusing" (Indian Express) and "trapped within the four walls of averageness" (NDTV).

== Cast ==
- Supriya Pathak as Sarla Joshi
- Manoj Pahwa as Umesh Joshi Sujan
- Chakori Dwivedi as Jigyasa Joshi
- Poojan Chhabra as Naman Joshi
- Happy Ranajit as Pappu Pathak
- Arnav Bhasin as inexperienced architect in Episode 2
- Nidhi Bisht as SDM in Episode 4
- Biswapati Sarkar as Corrupt government officer in Episode 4
- Rakesh Bedi in Episode 5
- Sameer Saxena as Poet Muradabadi in Episode 5
- Neha Tomar as Akshara Mehta
- Amarjeet Singh as Shankar Dhoni
- Neelu Dogra as Gulatan
- Yamini Singh as Mehtan

== Episodes ==
No.	Title	Directed by	Written by	Original release date
1	"Joshis ka Bhoomi Pujan"	Akanksha Dua	Mayank Pandey / Saurabh Khanna	6 May 2022
Sarla Joshi eagerly looks forward to the bhoomi pujan, thanks to her thorough planning. But her husband and children have other respective priorities. Sujan is more interested in watching a cricket match and their daughter is planning a camping trip for herself.
2	"Ghar ka Naksha"	Akanksha Dua	Mayank Pandey / Saurabh Khanna	6 May 2022
The floor planning of the new house goes for a toss as Sarla and Umesh demand a study. Naman demands a private gym and Jigyasa a personal attached bathroom. It is not possible that all of them cannot have their way.
3	"Deewaaron ki Taraai"	Akanksha Dua	Akshay Asthana	6 May 2022
4	"Ghar ka Lanter"	Akanksha Dua	Akshay Asthana / Saurabh Khanna / Nikhil Sachan	6 May 2022
5	"Budget ke Bahar Wale Interiors"	Akanksha Dua	Akshay Asthana / Saurabh Khanna	6 May 2022
6	"Happy Annisary"	Akanksha Dua	Akshay Asthana / Saurabh Khanna	6 May 2022
