= Shuruaat Ka Interval =

- Theatrical release poster
- Directed by: Aarti S. Bagdi, Amrit Raj Gupta, Atanu Mukherjee, Ankit Tripathi, Krishan Hooda, Palash Vaswani, Rukshana Tabassum, Shishir Jha
- Written by: Aarti S. Bagdi, Ankit Tripathi, Atanu Mukherjee, Biswapati Sarkar, Gautam Ved, Krishan Hooda, Palash Vaswani, Rukshana Tabassum, Shishir Jha
- Produced by: Humaramovie
- Release date: 15 August 2014
- Running time: 99 minutes
- Country: India
- Language: Hindi

Shuruaat Ka Interval is a 2014 Indian anthology feature film directed by eight filmmakers, namely Aarti S. Bagdi, Amrit Raj Gupta, Atanu Mukherjee, Ankit Tripathi, Krishan Hooda, Palash Vaswani, Rukshana Tabassum and Shishir Jha.

PVR Director's Rare & Humaramovie presented the short film anthology Shuruaat Ka Interval, which includes 8 shorts from various filmmakers, chosen and mentored by filmmakers Imtiaz Ali, Vikramaditya Motwane, Anand Gandhi & Vikas Bahl. All the films are based on one theme: Interval, which has been interpreted in a different, unique way by each filmmaker.

== Cast ==
- Sayani Gupta
- Jitendra Kumar
- Anil Mange
- Jim Sarbh
- Shivankit Parihar
- Rohan Shah
- Namya Saxena
- Sundip Ved
