= Dry day (disambiguation) =

Dry days are specific days when the sale of alcohol is not allowed in India.

Dry day may also refer to:

- Dry Day, an Indian comedy drama film
- "Dry Day", a song by The Stranglers, single B-side from the album Dreamtime
