= Arushi Sharma =

Indian actress (born 1992)

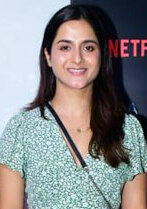
- Sharma in 2020
- Born: 18 November 1992 (age 33); Shimla, Himachal Pradesh, India
- Education: Jaypee University of Information Technology
- Occupation: Actress
- Years active: 2015–present
- Spouse: Vaibhav Vishant

Arushi Sharma (born 18 November 1992) is an Indian actress who works in Hindi films and series. She made her acting debut with a minor role in Imtiaz Ali's film Tamasha (2015) and received recognition for her work in Ali's Love Aaj Kal (2020). Sharma has since starred in the Netflix drama film Jaadugar (2022) and series Kaala Pani (2023).

== Early life ==
Sharma was born on 18 November 1995 in Shimla, Himachal Pradesh. Her parents are lawyers. She graduated in Information Technology from Jaypee University of Information Technology, Himachal Pradesh. She was working in Gurugram, before venturing into acting.

== Career ==
Sharma started her acting career in 2015 with Imtiaz Ali's Tamasha. She played Ranbir Kapoor's character's teacher and appeared as Samyukta in the song "Chali Kahani".

She then appeared in two short films, Catorce: Diminishing Returns with Dhruv Sehgal in 2017 and The Other Way with Pavail Gulati in 2018. Sharma appeared opposite Kartik Aaryan in Ali's Love Aaj Kal. Hindustan Times mentioned, "Arushi is subtle, simple and lets her expression and face impress more than her dialogues". Times of India noted that Sharma delivers quite effectively.

In 2022, Sharma appeared in Netflix's Jaadugar opposite Jitendra Kumar. She portrayed a doctor, Disha Chabbra, whose paths crosses with a magician, who is also a footballer. Rediff.com said, "Sharma goes with the flow and empowers Meenu's unhealthiest instincts with yet another demonstration of Bollywood's dangerously docile." India Today mentioned her performance as average. Sharma also starred in Netflix's series Kaala Pani (2023).

== Filmography ==
=== Films ===
Key
†	Denotes films that have not yet been released

Year	Title	Role	Notes	Ref.
2015	Tamasha	Samyukta		
2018	The Other Way	Hotel Staff	Short film	
2020	Love Aaj Kal	Leena Gupta		
2022	Jaadugar	Dr. Disha Chhabra	Netflix film	
2024	My Melbourne	Sakshi	Anthology film	

=== Television ===
Year	Title	Role	Notes	Ref.
2023	Kaala Pani	Jyotsana Dey		
