= Jab We Matched =

Indian television series

- Genre: Drama; Romance
- Created by: Sharanya Rajgopal
- Written by: Neil Chitnis; Raj Routh; Amrit Paul; Bhavya Raj; Ritu Mago
- Directed by: Srinivas Sunderrajan
- Starring: Mayur More; Abhishek Nigam; Shivangi Joshi; Prit Kamani; Priyank Sharma; Jasmin Bhasin; Revathi Pillai
- Country of origin: India
- Original language: Hindi
- No. of seasons: 1
- No. of episodes: 4

Production
- Producer: Anuj Gosalia
- Cinematography: Ihjaz Aziz
- Editors: Simranjeet Singh Malhotra; Vibhav Nigam
- Running time: 25-27 minutes
- Production company: Terribly Tiny Tales

Original release
- Network: Amazon miniTV
- Release: 10 February 2023

Jab We Matched (transl. When We Matched) is an Indian anthology streaming television series written by Raj Routh which premiered on 10 February 2023 on Amazon miniTV. The series features four stand-alone episodes directed by Srinivas Sunderrajan and stars Mayur More, Abhishek Nigam, Shivangi Joshi, Prit Kamani, Priyank Sharma, Jasmin Bhasin and Revathi Pillai.

== Cast ==
Episode 1: Dating algorithm

- Mayur More as Roshith
- Abhishek Nigam as Chirag

Episode 2: Sirf Ek Date

- Shivangi Joshi as Prachi
- Prit Kamani as Vicky

Episode 3: Jalkukde

- Priyank Sharma as Sunny
- Jasmin Bhasin as Payal

Episode 4: Formula Sheet

- Revathi Pillai as Reena

== Production ==
The series was announced by Sharanya Rajgopal on Amazon miniTV consisting of four episodes. Abhishek Nigam, Priyank Sharma, Mayur More, Prit Kamani, Shivangi Joshi, Jasmin Bhasin and Revathi Pillai were cast to appear in the series.

The trailer of the series was released in February 2023.

== Episodes ==
No.	Title	Directed by	Original release date
1	"Dating Algorithm"	Srinivas Sunderrajan	10 February 2023
2	"Sirf Ek Date"	Srinivas Sunderrajan	10 February 2023
3	"Jalkukde"	Srinivas Sunderrajan	10 February 2023
4	"Formula Sheet"	Srinivas Sunderrajan	10 February 2023

== Reception ==
Archika Khurana of The Times of India rated the series 3.9/5 and wrote "Jab We Matched' has enough drama, surprises, and convincing performances to make this dating experience worthwhile."

A reviewer for Bollywood Tadka gave 3.5 stars out of 5 praising the performance of Shivangi and Jasmin.
