= Babil Khan =

Indian actor (born 1998)

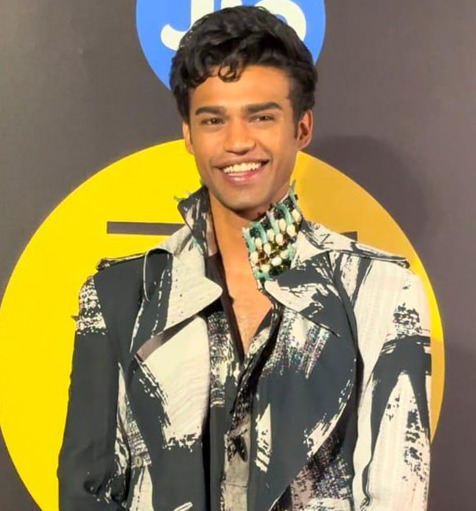
- Khan in 2023
- Born: 15 May 1998 (age 28); Mumbai, Maharashtra, India
- Education: University of Westminster
- Occupation: Actor
- Years active: 2022–present
- Father: Irrfan Khan

Babil Khan (born 15 May 1998) is an Indian actor. The son of actor Irrfan Khan, he began his career as a camera assistant, before making his acting debut in Hindi cinema with Qala (2022). He has since starred in the miniseries The Railway Men (2023).

== Early life and education ==
Babil Khan was born on 15 May 1998, in Mumbai to actor Irrfan Khan and writer Sutapa Sikdar. He has a younger brother, Ayaan Khan.

Khan completed his schooling at Tridha School, Mumbai and studied further at the University of Westminster, London.

== Career ==
After completing his studies, he started as a camera assistant in Bollywood film Qarib Qarib Single.

In 2022, he made his acting debut with Anvita Dutt's psychological drama Qala alongside Tripti Dimri.

In 2023, he was seen playing Juhi Chawla's son Siddharth Menon in a Netflix original film Friday Night Plan. He next starred in YRF's web series The Railway Men, a story on Bhopal Gas Tragedy, alongside Divyendu Sharma, Kay Kay Menon and R. Madhavan in pivotal roles.

He will also star in Shoojit Sircar's The Umesh Chronicles with Amitabh Bachchan.

== Personal life ==
In May 2024, Khan shared a series of photographs and emotional messages on Instagram about "moving on" and missing someone he had loved. The posts attracted media attention and were widely interpreted by fans and some media outlets as referring to a personal relationship, although Khan did not publicly confirm the nature of the relationship. Online speculation linked the posts to actress Medha Rana, Khan's co-star in Friday Night Plan, though no reliable source or official statement confirmed such claims. One of the posts also featured his friend Prakriti Pavani, but neither Khan nor Pavani confirmed any romantic involvement. The posts drew reactions from fans and comments from Khan's mother, Sutapa Sikdar.

== Filmography ==
=== Films ===
Year	Title	Role	Notes	Ref.
2017	Qarib Qarib Single	—N/a	Camera assistant	
2022	Qala	Jagan Batwal		
2023	Friday Night Plan	Siddharth Menon		
2025	Logout	Pratyush Dua		

=== Television ===
Year	Title	Role	Notes	Ref.
2023	The Railway Men	Imad Riaz	Miniseries	

=== Music videos ===
Year	Title	Singer	Ref.
2023	"Dastoor"	Jasleen Royal	

== Awards and nominations ==
Year	Award	Category	Work	Result	Ref.
2023	Zee Cine Awards	Best Male Debut	Qala	Won	
2023	Bollywood Hungama Style Icons	Most Stylish Breakthrough Talent (Male)	Qala	Nominated	
2023	IIFA Awards	Star Debut of the Year (Male)	Qala	Won	
2024	Filmfare OTT Awards	Best Supporting Actor in a Series (Male): Drama	The Railway Men	Nominated	
