= Jaadugar (2022 film) =

2022 Indian Hindi-language sports drama film directed by Sameer Saxena

- Official release poster
- Directed by: Sameer Saxena
- Written by: Biswapati Sarkar
- Produced by: Saurabh Khanna; Amit Golani; Sameer Saxena
- Starring: Jitendra Kumar; Arushi Sharma; Javed Jaffrey
- Cinematography: Soumik Mukherjee
- Edited by: Dev Rao Jadhav
- Music by: Nilotpal Bora
- Production company: Posham Pa Pictures
- Distributed by: Netflix
- Release date: 15 July 2022
- Running time: 167 minutes
- Country: India
- Language: Hindi

Jaadugar (transl. Magician) is a 2022 Indian Hindi-language sports drama film directed by Sameer Saxena and written by Biswapati Sarkar and produced under the banner of the newly established production company Posham Pa Pictures. The film features Jitendra Kumar and Arushi Sharma in the lead roles, alongside Jaaved Jaaferi.

== Premise ==
In a small football-loving town Neemuch in Madhya Pradesh, a small-time magician, Magic Meenu who has no athletic skill must help his team win a football trophy to marry his love interest, but the problem is that his team hasn't won a game in many years.

== Cast ==
- Jitendra Kumar as Meenu Narang
- Arushi Sharma as Dr. Disha Chhabra
- Javed Jaffrey as Pradeep Narang, Meenu's uncle
- Manoj Joshi as magician Chhabra, Disha's father
- Raj Qushal as Lalli
- Raksha Pannwar as Dipa
- Shoan Zagade as Riju George
- Sandeep Shikhar as Ramswaroop
- Rajiv Nema as Natkhat Nema, commentator
- Sameer Saxena as Doshi
- Rukshar Dhillon as Iccha
- Purnendu Bhattacharya as Avinash
- Dhruv Thukral as Shekhawat
- Shayank shukla as Hemu

== Production ==
The official announcement of the film was made in March 2021 by Netflix India YouTube channel.

== Release ==
The film was released worldwide on 15 July 2022 via Netflix in Hindi and dubbed versions in English, Tamil and Telugu.

== Critical reception ==
Archika Khurana of The Times of India rated the film 3/5 stars and wrote, "‘Jaadugar’ has enough moments that will draw you into Meenu's jaadugiri but fails to score that metaphorical goal." Anuj Kumar of The Hindu wrote, "An engaging slice-of-life cinema that sincerely tries to steer clear of the cliches, Jaadugar addresses complex issues of love and commitment with unvarnished charm."

Chandhini R of Cinema Express gave the film 2.5/5 stars and wrote, "Unlike the predominant sports dramas which have a set template of underdogs scripting miraculous history in the third act, Jaadugar stands apart for its rather rooted and justifiable climax". Tanushree Roy of India Today wrote, "Jaadugar is not about magic or sports, it's somewhere in between and, by the end, we are left with confused feelings. While Jeetu bhaiya is a must-watch, the film, not so much. Watch it for Jitendra's acting skills and some really cool magic tricks".

Sukanya Verma of Rediff rated the film 2/5 stars and wrote, "Jaadugar's aim to interconnect these two diverse circumstances at nearly three hours comes across as a feature film masquerading as an eight-part Web series." Saibal Chatterjee of NDTV wrote, "The film is about magic, football, love and an iteration of the Dronacharya-Eklavya myth all rolled into one. But the coalescence of the components is far from seamless."

Nandini Ramnath of Scroll.in wrote, "Jitendra Kumar does an admirable job of portraying a reptilian-blooded character who can’t see beyond his nose. [...] Jaadugar seems keen to avoid being another film about an underdog team that aims for glory. Yet, it’s the formula that wins, and the football that sticks." Suchin Mehrotra of Hindustan Times wrote, "Jitendra Kumar and Javed Jaafery-starrer sports comedy film is exhausting and confusing instead of being funny."
