= September 21 (film) =

2026 Indian Kannada language film

- Poster
- Directed by: Karen Kshiti Suvarna
- Written by: Raj Shekhar
- Dialogues by: Vinay Sandilya; Bhupendra Nandan
- Produced by: Ramesh Bhandari; Vijay Chaudhary; Srinivas Bettadapura
- Starring: Pravin Singh Sisodia; Priyanka Upendra
- Cinematography: Anil Kumar K
- Edited by: Nikhil Kadam
- Music by: Vinayy Chandraa
- Production companies: Visica Films; FMD Productions; Humaramovie; FilmsMax
- Release date: 22 May 2026
- Country: India
- Languages: Hindi; Kannada

September 21 is a 2026 Indian bilingual drama film directed by Karen Kshiti Suvarna. Shot simultaneously in Hindi and Kannada, the film stars Pravin Singh Sisodia, Priyanka Upendra, Zarina Wahab and Amit Behl. The film explores the lives of Alzheimer's disease patients and the emotional and psychological challenges faced by their caregivers.

== Cast ==
- Pravin Singh Sisodia as Raj Kumar
- Priyanka Upendra as Kamala
- Zarina Wahab as Sudha
- Amit Behi as Samuel
- Ricky Rudra as Kiran
- Sachin Patekar as Muniandi
- Vinnie as Anita
- Yuvin as Venu
- Umesh Sakkarenadu as Kumar
- Jayalaxmi Mulki
- Ankita Jayaram as Maya

== Reception ==
Dhaval Roy of The Times of India said that "Although the film lacks a proper story and mostly depicts day-to-day life, the narrative works well, despite its intermittent slow pace." A. Sharadhaa of the Cinema Express said that the film "suggests that Alzheimer's doesn't erase love; it rearranges it. By reminding us of this, the film gently shifts our focus to the caregivers, those who stand beside fading memories. September 21 finds its emotional anchor in performance, with its actors lending flesh and fragility to a story about memory and loss." Vinamra Mathur of the Firstpost said that the film "leaves a quiet yet powerful emotional impact. A sensitive film on Alzheimer's, fading memory, and unseen caregivers." Y. Maheswara Reddy of the Bangalore Mirror said that "Priyanka Upendra has acted well. Pravin Singh Sisodia walks away with all honours for his sterling performance."
