= Logout (film) =

- Theatrical release poster
- Directed by: Amit Golani
- Written by: Biswapati Sarkar
- Produced by: Kevin Vaz; Ajit Andhare; Sameer Saxena; Saurabh Khanna; Amit Golani; Biswapati Sarkar
- Starring: Babil Khan; Rasika Dugal; Gandharv Dewan; Nimisha Nair
- Cinematography: Pooja S Gupte
- Edited by: Atanu Mukherjee
- Music by: Haroon-Gavin
- Production companies: Viacom18 Studios; Posham Pa Pictures
- Distributed by: ZEE5
- Release date: 18 April 2025
- Running time: 108 minutes
- Country: India
- Language: Hindi

Logout is a 2025 Indian Hindi-language cyber thriller drama film starring Babil Khan, which is also a sharp critique on our dependence on smartphones. The cast also includes Rasika Dugal, Gandharv Dewan, and Nimisha Nair. Directed by Amit Golani, produced by Viacom18 Studios and Posham Pa Pictures and written by Biswapati Sarkar, Logout explores the dark side of digital fame and the psychological toll of life lived online. It was released on ZEE5 on 18 April 2025.

== Plot ==
Logout follows Pratyush Dua (Babil Khan), a popular social media influencer on the verge of reaching ten million followers. Charismatic and engaging, Pratyush has built his public image around a carefully curated digital persona. While his online success continues to rise, his sister expresses concern about his increasing obsession with fame and online validation.

His phone is stolen by an obsessed fan with the online handle of Pratmaniac1. Initially, she makes him believe that he left it in a taxi when he was drunk the previous night and pretends to communicate with the taxi driver to leave it at his house. However, when he uses Find my Phone to play a sound, it is revealed that she actually has the phone.

Enraged, Pratyush tries to bribe and threaten her to give his phone back. She refuses and he calls his manager JD to report this to the authorities and try and catch her. However, when she learns of this, she posts a picture on his social media of him eating chicken from KFC, even though he pretends to be vegan. He is initially scared of the pushback and thinks his followers will unfollow him and he won't reach 10 million. However, he discovers the controversy actually makes him gain followers.

He calls his manager JD and tells him not to contact the authorities, since he is still gaining followers and he is scared that if she learns of it, she will delete his account permanently. After that, he tries to figure out who she is. She gives him her initials "SK", using which he tries to figure out who she is. He searches for her on various websites, and finds the name of her father and the college he teaches at which he hastily notes down before he is interrupted by SK threatening him to share his screen on the call.

She lets him end the call so that he can eat lunch, and he installs a landline telephone to use for calls. He calls his ex-girlfriend and apologises for lying about her, and gets her to look on the college's website for SK's father. This search proves inconclusive as the name he had noted down was actually of a different professor who was female. He does not know what to do and repeatedly declines SK's call, in order to find out who her father actually is.

He watches the video he found of her father and learns his real name (Prof. Kishore). He then calls the number listed on the website, which SK's brother picks up. He reveals that SK's name is Sakshi and she suffers from an addiction to her phone – which her father tried to take away, so she stole his inhalers and ran away from home, thereby sending her father to the hospital. He begs Pratyush to ask Sakshi to return home and to tell her that all will be forgiven, since he thinks that Sakshi will listen to Pratyush.

Pratyush then accepts her call and explains to her that what she did was wrong, and that he wants her to go home and doesn't care about his follower count anymore. However, she is convinced that she wants a love story like Laila-Majnu (characters that Pratyush parodies on his channel), and she forces him to let her permanently delete his account or ruin his ex-girlfriend's life, whom Sakshi thinks was wrong for leaving him. Pratyush is not able to choose, so he breaks down in tears, due to which Sakshi ends the call.

Later, she cryptically sends him a message about his niece, due to which he frantically calls his sister and asks her to safeguard her daughter and stay in the house. He accepts Sakshi's call and asks her not to mess with his family. JD finds out where Sakshi is from the specific points in her latest post. Pratyush confirms this, and JD goes there with a gun. However, he doesn't find Sakshi, and instead finds Pratyush's phone, which he picks up and is immediately pushed off the ledge by Sakshi.

Sakshi takes JD's phone and pretends to be JD, telling Pratyush that she will be arrested soon and asks him to come to the building where she is. Reluctantly, Pratyush arrives and he finds Sakshi with JD's gun. She reveals to him that when he reaches 10 million followers, she will kill him and then herself.

Sakshi forces Pratyush to do a viral trend where the person has to pull down his pants and twerk. Pratyush doesn't want to do it, and during the live stream he breaks down. He tells them about what he had done to his father and asks them to unfollow him since his life is in danger. But the follower count keeps increasing, and Sakshi points the gun at Pratyush. Sakshi isn't able to shoot Pratyush because there is a safety lock on the gun. At this moment, Pratyush's mother calls, and he hears his phone ringing nearby. Pratyush finds his phone, and smashes it using a hammer. He doesn't harm Sakshi, but he informs the building's guards about her.

He subsequently goes to his niece's school for her Annual Day show, where he again breaks down upon meeting his father and apologises to him. Then, another influencer takes a photo of him at the event, and sees his likes increasing, showing the same obsession brewing inside him.

== Cast ==
- Babil Khan as Pratyush Dua, aka Pratman
- Rasika Dugal as Pratyush's Sister
- Gandharv Dewan as excitable manager JD
- Nimisha Nair as obsessive fan Sakshi Kishore aka SK
- Medha Rana as The Girl in the party
- Bhuvan Bam as Himself (cameo appearance)

== Production ==
The film was produced by Digital 18 Media Private Limited (formerly Viacom18 Studios) in association with Posham Pa Pictures. Prior to its streaming debut, the film was screened at several international film festivals in 2024, including the Indian Film Festival of Stuttgart, Indian Film Festival of Melbourne, and River to River Florence Indian Film Festival in 2024.

== Release ==
The official trailer was released on 8 April 2025, alongside the announcement of the release date. Logout was released on ZEE5 on 18 April 2025.

== Reception ==
Logout received largely positive reviews, with critics praising Babil Khan's performance as a social media influencer confronting cyberstalking, while opinions varied on the screenplay, pacing, and technical aspects. The film's focus on social media addiction, privacy, and isolation was noted, though some found the climax and narrative execution lacking.

Shilajit Mitra of The Hindu wrote that Khan's "magnetic performance anchors the cyberstalking thriller," but noted uneven pacing and a dramatic conclusion. Rishabh Suri from Hindustan Times noted the film as a "relatable take on smartphone-driven chaos," highlighting Khan's ability to lead the narrative. Udita Jhunjhunwala of Mint described it as a "watchable commentary on digital isolation," praising Khan but critiquing the inconsistent screenplay. Sukanya Verma from Rediff.com noted a "chilling digital descent," but said Rasika Dugal's role was underused. Shubhra Gupta of The Indian Express wrote that the film "raises questions about digital obsession but falters in improbability," citing plot conveniences. A reviewer for ABP Live noted that the thriller "offers a glimpse into influencer life," commending Khan but pointing to narrative gaps. Prachi Arya from India Today wrote that Khan "stands out in a tech-thriller," but highlighted technical flaws.

Vinamra Mathur of Firstpost noted Khan's "strong performance in a relevant thriller," though some elements felt uneven. Trisha Gaur from Koimoi wrote that Khan's "intense act echoes Shah Rukh Khan’s ‘Fan’," but criticized CGI and dubbing issues. Shreyanka Mazumdar of News18 described the film as "impactful yet inconsistent," praising Khan but noting tonal shifts. Pratikshya Mishra from The Quint noted that the film "explores the influencer-follower dynamic," but found the climax rushed. Rahul Desai from Hollywood Reporter India wrote that Khan "drives the screenlife thriller," but narrative inconsistencies persisted. Ronak Kotecha from The Times of India noted Khan's "gripping act in a digital obsession tale," but said metaphors felt forced. Aishwarya Vasudevan of OTTplay wrote that Khan "lifts a tale of isolation," though the screenplay faltered.

Sharva Srivastava from Times Now noted the film's "take on influencer culture," but said the screenlife format disrupted flow. Troy Ribeiro of The Free Press Journal wrote that the thriller "captures a digital descent," but the climax was predictable. Nandini Ramnath from Scroll.in noted that the film "comments on social media behaviour," but criticized its metaphors. Varsha Agarwal of DNA India wrote that the thriller "outshines ‘CTRL’," likening it to ‘Fan’ for its obsessive themes. Sulaya Singha from Sangbad Pratidin noted that Khan's act "lifts the film’s take on digital pressures," but pacing lagged. Dipti Mishra from Jagran wrote that the film "tackles internet obsession," driven by Khan's act. Pankaj Shukla of Amar Ujala noted a "take on digital fame," but said the resolution was rushed.
