= Humaramovie =

- Industry: Film production
- Founded: 2011; 15 years ago
- Key people: Vinay Mishra, Preety Ali, Pallavi Rohatgi and Raghavan
- Products: Films
- Website: www.youtube.com/humaramovie

Humaramovie, also occasionally stylized HumaraMovie, is an Indian YouTube channel and initiative that was launched in 2011 by Vinay Mishra, Preety Ali, Pallavi Rohatgi and Raghavan. The channel specializes in short film and is known for providing a platform for young filmmakers.

In 2014 Humaramovie launched the Shuruaat Ka Interval, a film festival that is hosted digitally and at PVR Cinemas, where the chosen films will be screened. Since then the channel has also launched Shor Se Shuruaat, a short-film mentoring program that would team eight participants with directors such as Shyam Benegal, Mira Nair, Zoya Akhtar, Imtiaz Ali, Sriram Raghavan, Nagesh Kukunoor and Homi Adajania.

== Filmography ==
=== Films produced and distributed ===
Year	Title	Notes	Ref.
2014	Shuruaat Ka Interval	—N/a	—N/a
2016	Shor Se Shuruaat	—N/a	—N/a
2016	Khamakha	Won People's Choice Award for Best Film at 62nd Filmfare Awards	
2026	September 21	A bilingual film shot and released in both Kannada and Hindi language.	—N/a
