= Kaala Paani =

Indian television series (2023)

- Genre: Survival drama Thriller
- Created by: Sameer Saxena
- Written by: Biswapati Sarkar; Nimisha Misra; Sandeep Saket; Amit Golani
- Directed by: Sameer Saxena; Amit Golani
- Starring: Mona Singh; Ashutosh Gowariker; Amey Wagh; Arushi Sharma; Vikas Kumar; Chinmay Mandlekar; Poornima Indrajith
- Composer: Rachita Arora
- Country of origin: India
- Original language: Hindi
- No. of seasons: 1
- No. of episodes: 7

Production
- Executive producer: Keval Shah
- Producer: Sameer Saxena
- Cinematography: Ewan Mulligan; Barny Crocker; Dhananjay Navagrah
- Editor: Dev Rao Jadhav
- Camera setup: Multi-camera
- Running time: 57–70 minutes
- Production company: Posham Pa Pictures

Original release
- Network: Netflix
- Release: 18 October 2023

Kaala Paani is an Indian Hindi-language survival drama thriller television series for Netflix, which was first streamed on 18 October 2023. It was created by Sameer Saxena and written by Biswapati Sarkar, Nimisha Misra, Sandeep Saket, and Amit Golani. It stars Mona Singh, Ashutosh Gowariker, Amey Wagh, Vikas Kumar, Chinmay Mandlekar, Sukant Goel, Arushi Sharma, Radhika Mehrotra, and Poornima Indrajith in lead roles.

At the 2024 Filmfare OTT Awards, Kaala Paani received 8 nominations, including Best Drama Series and Best Supporting Actor in a Drama Series (for Goel), and won 3 awards, including Best Director in a Drama Series (for Saxena and Golani).

On April 30, 2025, the series was cancelled after one season.

== Episodes ==
The first season of Kaala Paani comprises seven episodes, each approximately one hour.

No. overall	No. in season	Title	Directed by	Written by	Original release date
1	1	"Nature Wins"	Sameer Saxena, Amit Golani	Biswapati Sarkar	October 18, 2023
2	2	"The Switch"	Sameer Saxena, Amit Golani	Biswapati Sarkar, Amit Golani	October 18, 2023
3	3	"Garjen"	Sameer Saxena, Amit Golani	Biswapati Sarkar, Nimisha Misra	October 18, 2023
4	4	"Eraba Reta Mono"	Sameer Saxena, Amit Golani	Biswapati Sarkar, Sandeep Saket	October 18, 2023
5	5	"The Immortal Being"	Sameer Saxena, Amit Golani	Biswapati Sarkar	October 18, 2023
6	6	"Forefathers"	Sameer Saxena, Amit Golani	Biswapati Sarkar	October 18, 2023
7	7	"Darwin's Bay"	Sameer Saxena, Amit Golani	Biswapati Sarkar	October 18, 2023

== Cast ==
- Mona Singh as Dr. Soudamini Singh, Chief Medical Officer
- Ashutosh Gowariker as Lieutenant governor Zibran Qadri
- Amey Wagh as SDPO Ketan Kamat
- Vikas Kumar as Santosh Savla
- Sarika Singh as Gargi Savla
- Radhika Mehrotra as Dr. Ritu Gagra
- Chinmay Mandlekar as Dr. Shashi Mahajan, Deputy Chief Medical Officer
- Sukant Goel as Chiranjeevi "Chiru" Prabhu, Veenu's elder brother
- Priyansh Jora as Vinayak "Veenu" Prabhu, Chiru's younger brother
- Arushi Sharma as Jyotsna Dey, Veenu's best friend and crush
- Payash Jain as Parth Savla "Guchhu"
- Aradhya Ajana as Vidisha Savla "Kaddu"
- Poornima Indrajith as Swasti Shaw
- Rajesh Khattar as Saurabh Wani
- Kannan Arunchalam as SP Sivakumar
- Veena Nair as Parvathy Amma, Vinayak's mother
- Avinash Kuri as Rupak
- David Wurawa as Osei
- Desire Junior Binde as Enmae
- Dhaniram Prajapati as Nandan
- Parag Chadha as Prabhjyot
- Ali Asghar Shah as Ali
- Veerendra Saxena as Bunker Basu
- Ketan Karande as Rajbir / Kanchan, Saurabh's bodyguard
- Jagdish Rajpurohit as Chief Secretary Bhowmik

== Production ==
The series was announced by Netflix on 14 July 2023. Set in the Andaman and Nicobar Islands, the first teaser of the series was released on 20 September 2023. Filming of the series was concluded in early 2022.

The trailer of the series was released in early October 2023. Netflix renewed the series for a second season in November 2023.

== Release ==
Kaala Paani was released on 18 October 2023 on Netflix.

== Reception ==
=== Critical reception ===
On the review aggregator website Rotten Tomatoes, 77% of 13 critics' reviews are positive, with an average rating of 7.3/10.

Joel Keller for Decider wrote "Kaala Paani moves along nicely enough that it should keep viewers on the edge of their seats".

Shilajit Mitra of The Hindu wrote "The grim ecological backdrop of Kaala Paani is both leavened and reinforced by the small human moments in the fore, with its middle-class characters fuzzing over wafers and nicknames in the face of looming tragedy."

Saibal Chatterjee of NDTV stated "Kaala Paani situates numerous significant stories, contemporary and historical, in the collective and the personal in search of an answer to that question."

Shubhra Gupta of The Indian Express stated "Kaala Paani startles you, but it also tells you that the story-tellers are serious about their intent, that there will be no waffling, just cutting to chase."

Reviewing for Rediff.com, a critic Deepa Gahlot wasn't impressed by the series and stated "Kaala Paani has a lot going for it -- the scenic locations, the cast, and a problem of modern-day apathy towards the environment, that is putting all of humanity on a power keg waiting to explode".

The Free Press Journal opined "Effectively written by Saxena, Golani and Biswapati Sarkar, Kaala Paani stands as a fitting metaphor to a similar predicament that we all were in for a brief period."

Lachmi Deb Roy of Firstpost rated the series 4 out of 5 stars and stated "The script, the story, the editing is sharp and the screenplay is engaging. The back and forth storytelling makes Kaala Paani all the more engaging."

Pinkvilla praised the series and wrote "There's nothing in Kaala Paani that doesn't work. The show is a masterpiece and deserves to be watched by one and all."

The New Indian Express stated "Resultantly, Kaala Paani feels wonky in instances, taking too much time to arrive at a predictable point."

The Quint wrote "Kaala Paani could allude to a lot – to the name the Cellular Jail often goes by, to the murky waters that surround the islands, and even to the way seemingly dangerous water becomes a leitmotif in the film."

Scroll.in stated "Kaala Paani has some virtuous notes and themes, but overstuffing the series, and some illogical swings in the story, dissipate the thrill of a survival drama."

A critic from Zoom TV wrote "The most compelling aspects of Kaala Paani are the stories of resilience and survival."

=== Viewership ===
Kaala Paani debuted at number 8 in the Netflix Global Top 10 for Non-English TV with 11,700,000 hours viewed and 1,600,000 views.

== Accolades ==
Award	Date of the ceremony	Category	Recipients	Result	Ref.
Filmfare OTT Awards	1 December 2024	Best Drama Series	Kaala Paani	Nominated	
Filmfare OTT Awards	1 December 2024	Best Director in a Drama Series	Sameer Saxena And Amit Golani	Won	
Filmfare OTT Awards	1 December 2024	Best Supporting Actor in a Drama Series	Sukant Goel	Nominated	
Filmfare OTT Awards	1 December 2024	Best Original Story (Series)	Biswapati Sarkar	Won	
Filmfare OTT Awards	1 December 2024	Best Original Screenplay (Series)	Biswapati Sarkar	Nominated	
Filmfare OTT Awards	1 December 2024	Best Cinematographer (Series)	Ewan Mulligan, Barny Crocker, and Dhananjay Navagrah	Nominated	
Filmfare OTT Awards	1 December 2024	Best Editing (Series)	Dev Rao Jadhav	Nominated	
Filmfare OTT Awards	1 December 2024	Best Sound Design (Series)	Allwin Rego & Sanjay Maurya	Won	
