= ImMature =

Indian television series

- Poster of season 1
- Genre: Romantic comedy
- Written by: D. Krishna Prasad; Abhishek Yadav; Nishaad Zaveri; Suprith Kundar
- Directed by: Prem Mistry, Anant Singh
- Starring: Rashmi Agdekar; Omkaar Kulkarni; Chinmay Chandraunshuh
- Composer: Vaibhav Bundhoo
- Country of origin: India
- Original language: Hindi
- No. of seasons: 3
- No. of episodes: 15

Production
- Producer: Arunabh Kumar
- Cinematography: Jerin Paul
- Editor: Sahil Verma
- Production company: The Viral Fever

Original release
- Network: Amazon Prime Video
- Release: 20 February 2019 – present

ImMature (stylised as I'mMATURE) is an Indian Hindi-language coming-of-age romantic comedy television series produced by The Viral Fever. The show follows a one-conflict-per-episode format that ties into the protagonist Dhruv's larger quest to befriend his love interest Chhavi.

The music and background score for the series is composed by Vaibhav Bundhoo, with cinematography handled by Jerin Paul and Sahil Verma was the editor. It was premiered in April 2018 at the first edition of Canneseries International film festival, before being globally released on 20 February 2019 on Indian streaming platform MX Player as an original series. The series opened to positive response from audiences, and after the overwhelming reception, the makers announced for a renewal of the second season.

As of 2022, season 2 was available on Amazon Prime Video.

In December 2023, the 3rd season was released on Amazon Prime Video. In this same season during the last episode it was teased to viewers that fan-favourite character Chhavi would be returning in season 4. This also confirmed that the show had been renewed for a fourth season

== Cast ==
=== Main cast ===
- Omkar Kulkarni as Dhruv Sharma
- Rashmi Agdekar as Chhavi Upadhya
- Chinamay Chandraunshush as Kabir Bhuller
- Visshesh Tiwari (Season 1), Naman Jain (Season 2&3) as Master Susu
- Vikranth Thanikanti as God
- Kanikka Kapur as Chhaya (Season 2&3)
- Deepak Kumar Mishra as Lucky Bhaiya (Season 2)

=== Recurring cast ===
- Dilip Meralal as Golewala
- Komal Chhabaria as Dhruv's mom
- Sameer Saxena as Dhruv's dad (cameo)
- Paltu as Old lady on Walker
- Jitendra Kumar as Drama Teacher
- Vijay Rawal as Karan
- Sachin Negi as Nukkad
- Ranjan as Ranja
- Biswapati Sarkar as Hindi Teacher
- Nidhi Singh as Sonam Miss
- Himika Bose as Nandini/Natasha
- Gopal Datt as Vice Principal
- Nikhil Vijay as Shantanu Mehra
- Badri Chavhan as Waiter at the bar
- Nidhi Bisht as Aishwarya Miss
- Pradnya as kid with Shantanu
- Jaimin Panchal as student in class

== Episodes ==
=== Series overview ===
Season	Episodes	Originally released
1	5	February 20, 2019
2	5	August 26, 2022
3	5	December 15, 2023

=== Season 1 ===
No.	Title	Directed by	Written by	Original release date
1	"Daddy's Little Princess"	Prem Mistry	D.Krishna Prasad, Abhishek Yadav, Nishaad Zaveri, Suprith Kundar, D.Palia.	20 February 2019
Dhruv gets a new scooter as a surprise. But he expected a bullet bike from his parents. When they enter the 11th standard, Kabir asks Dhruv to get a bike in order to look cool in front of Chhavi. And excited Dhruv conveys the same to his parents and expects a new bullet bike. But things turn upside down for the young boy when the gift which he gets from his parents is nowhere close to his expectations.
2	"BeingHUMAyuN"	Prem Mistry	D.Krishna Prasad, Abhishek Yadav, Nishaad Zaveri, Suprith Kundarm & D.Palia.	20 February 2019
Dhruv participates in a school play with Chhavi. He thought to be the king but finds to be a brother, so he cancelled his role. On that same day he got to know about Chhavi's boyfriend Shantanu. He hatches a plan to get Ranjan ousted from the play so that he can play the lead role opposite Chhavi. Dhruv gives it all in order to impress Chhavi. But things take a turn for Dhruv when he gets the news that his character in the play is actually the rakhi brother of Chhavi's character.
3	"Pehla Pehla Pyaar, Pehla Pehla Bar"	Prem Mistry	D.Krishna Prasad, Abhishek Yadav, Nishaad Zaveri, & Suprith Kundar	20 February 2019
Dhruv goes to have wine with his friends and after that they together go to Shantanu's house to beat him. There they get to know about the break up of them.
4	"Unstable Equilibrium"	Prem Mistry	D.Krishna Prasad, Abhishek Yadav, Nishaad Zaveri, Suprith Kundar & D.Palia.	20 February 2019
Dhruv and Chhavi gets more closer to each other. Chhavi will have to go to Kota for two years for her entrance test. So they fixed their date.
5	"Triple H Versus The Rock (The Date)"	Prem Mistry	D.Krishna Prasad, Abhishek Yadav, Nishaad Zaveri, & Suprith Kundar	20 February 2019
After Natasha's words, Chhavi decides to friendzone Dhruv. But they both enjoyed the date and Dhruv gave her a farewell gift. Finally, Chhavi also composes her love for him. Dhruv fumbles a bit on his date with Chhavi, but in the end, he takes her running to the school. He gifts her a t-shirt displaying many memories: Her friends’ thoughts and farewells are scribbled on it, as she leaves for Kota for further studies. Finally, Chhavi kisses Dhruv, which he really wanted, but was hesitant to ask.

=== Season 2 ===
No.	Title	Directed by	Written by	Original release date
1	"Time for a Change"	Anant Singh	D. Krishna Prasad, Abhishek Yadav, Nishaad Zaveri, Suprith Kundar.	26 August 2022
2	"Sambhog Shastra"	Anant Singh	D. Krishna Prasad, Abhishek Yadav, Nishaad Zaveri, Suprith Kundar.	26 August 2022
3	"Roop Ki Rani Choron Ka Raja"	Anant Singh	D. Krishna Prasad, Abhishek Yadav, Nishaad Zaveri, Suprith Kundar.	26 August 2022
4	"Chhayajaal"	Anant Singh	D. Krishna Prasad, Abhishek Yadav, Nishaad Zaveri, Suprith Kundar.	26 August 2022
5	"A Night to Remember"	Anant Singh	D. Krishna Prasad, Abhishek Yadav, Nishaad Zaveri, Suprith Kundar.	26 August 2022

=== Season 3 ===
No.	Title	Directed by	Written by	Original release date
1	"It’s Complicated"	Anant Singh	D. Krishna Prasad, Abhishek Yadav, Nishaad Zaveri, Suprith Kundar.	15 December 2023
2	"All is Fair"	Anant Singh	D. Krishna Prasad, Abhishek Yadav, Nishaad Zaveri, Suprith Kundar.	15 December 2023
3	"Rumours"	Anant Singh	D. Krishna Prasad, Abhishek Yadav, Nishaad Zaveri, Suprith Kundar.	15 December 2023
4	"Week of Love"	Anant Singh	D. Krishna Prasad, Abhishek Yadav, Nishaad Zaveri, Suprith Kundar.	15 December 2023
5	"Is this how it ends?"	Anant Singh	D. Krishna Prasad, Abhishek Yadav, Nishaad Zaveri, Suprith Kundar.	15 December 2023

== Soundtrack ==
Immature

Soundtrack album by Vaibhav Bundhoo
- Released: 10 March 2019
- Genre: Soundtrack
- Length: 23:57
- Label: The Viral Fever
- Producer: Vaibhav Bundhoo

Immature's original soundtrack album from the series is composed and written by Vaibhav Bundhoo, who worked as the norm composer for the original projects of The Viral Fever. The soundtrack album featuring eight tracks were recorded by Bundhoo, Neha Rathod, Maria Roe Vincent, El Fé Choir and Pallak Ranka and was released on 10 March 2019.

All lyrics are written by Vaibhav Bundhoo.

Track listing
No.	Title	Singer(s)	Length
1.	"Duniya Kehti Hai – Opening Theme"	Vaibhav Bundhoo	0:46
2.	"The Golden Path"	Vaibhav Bundhoo	2:34
3.	"Our Own To Repair"	Vaibhav Bundhoo	2:35
4.	"They Ran Away"	Vaibhav Bundhoo	4:22
5.	"Starsign"	Vaibhav Bundhoo, Neha Rathod	2:36
6.	"Super Boy Super Girl"	Vaibhav Bundhoo, Maria Roe Vincent, El Fé Choir	4:27
7.	"Perfect Ending"	Vaibhav Bundhoo	3:32
8.	"Khoobsurat"	Vaibhav Bundhoo, Pallak Ranka	3:05
Total length:			23:57

Immature Season 2

Soundtrack album by Vaibhav Bundhoo, Prashanth Shrinivas
- Released: 31 August 2022
- Genre: Soundtrack
- Length: 29:31
- Label: The Viral Fever

ImMature Season 2 original soundtrack for the webseries was composed by Prashanth Srinivas. There are total 19 tracks with singers like Vaibhav Bundhoo, Sharanya Natrajan. The album was released on 31 August 2022.

All lyrics are written by Vaibhav Bundhoo.

Track listing
No.	Title	Singer(s)	Length
1.	"Milte Raho"	Vaibhav Bundhoo	4:11
2.	"Romedy"	Vaibhav Bundhoo	2:03
3.	"Strawberry Sugar"	Vaibhav Bundhoo	3:12
4.	"Making It Work"	Prashanth Shrinivas, Sharanya Natrajan	2:23
5.	"And We're Out of Control"	Prashanth Shrinivas	1:38
6.	"Still Immature"	Prashanth Shrinivas	0:50
7.	"Free Advice"	Prashanth Shrinivas	0:49
8.	"Study Groups"	Prashanth Shrinivas	0:57
9.	"Introspection"	Prashanth Shrinivas	1:37
10.	"Chavi Chats"	Prashanth Srinivas	1:13
11.	"Chhavi Chhavi Everywhere"	Prashanth Srinivas	1:41
12.	"Chaaya Chats"	Prashanth Srinivas	1:26
13.	"Mischief with Chaaya"	Prashanth Srinivas	1:23
14.	"Chaaya Can’t Relate"	Prashanth Srinivas	1:22
15.	"Meri Kavita"	Prashanth Srinivas	0:47
16.	"ImMature Picnic"	Prashanth Srinivas	0:39
17.	"ImMature Disco"	Prashanth Srinivas	0:49
18.	"Lucky Bhaiyya Ki Jai"	Prashanth Srinivas	1:01
19.	"Mischief Managed"	Prashanth Srinivas	1:22
Total length:			29:31

== Production ==
The show was shot at various locations in Mumbai (Including Hansraj Morarji Public School).

== Release ==
ImMature was premiered first on the Canneseries, an international series festival held at Cannes on 11 April 2018, thus becoming the first ever web series from The Viral Fever to be premiered at this festival. After several months, Sameer Saxena, the creative producer of TVF announced that the digital distribution rights of the film were sold to MX Player. The trailer for the series was released on 14 February 2019. MX Player released first two episodes on 18 February 2019, ahead of the scheduled date on 20 February, and the remaining episodes were released on the same date. In April 2019, it was announced that the makers had renewed for a second season.

== Reception ==
Sowmya Rao of Scroll.in reviewed "Immature's strong suit is its ability to tap into the elements that make adolescence ripe for dramatisation. This it does by looking at ordinary characters and trading glamour for a glimpse of school life that is far closer to reality [...] The series nails the endless catastrophising over small setbacks and worldview that's both self-centred and self-deprecating ... [It] is like an instant noodles formula: quick, easy, enjoyable but ultimately transient." Devasheesh Pandey of News18 wrote "The makers have effectively limited themselves to painting a target on frivolous boys, who eventually end up having their way. But in that there is a stark absence of a character that stands counter to the flippant story line. However, the performances of the lead actors are funny up to a point that it does not go overboard."
