= Revathi Pillai =

Indian actress (born 2002)

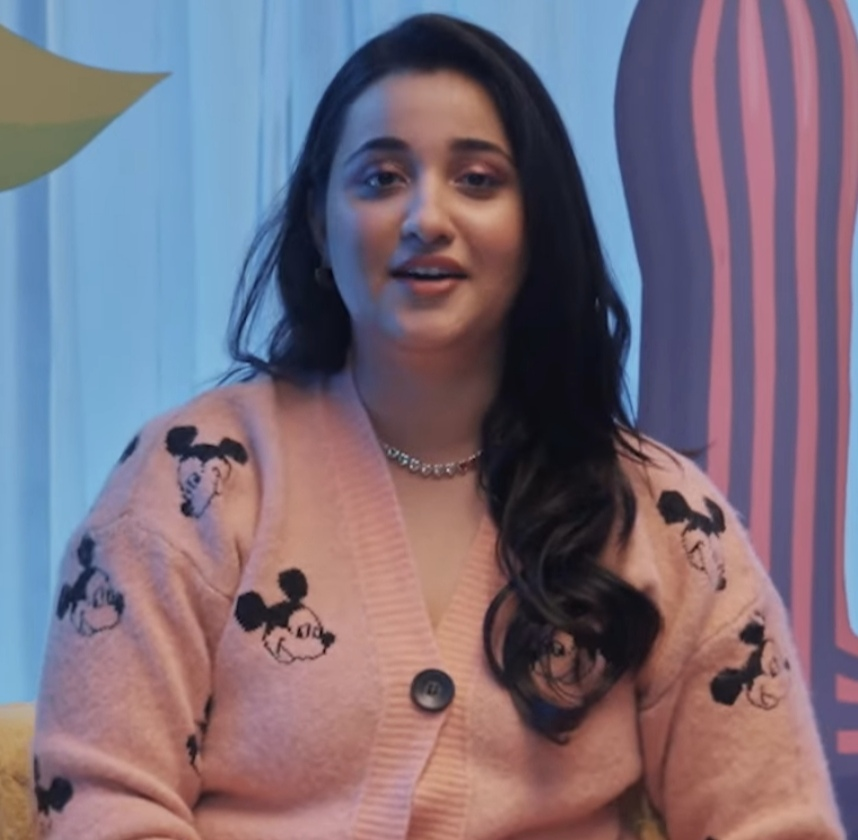
- Revathi Pillai
- Born: 5 June 2002 (age 24); Thane, Maharashtra, India
- Occupation: Actress
- Years active: 2019–present

Revathi Pillai (born June 5, 2002) is an Indian actress who primarily works in Hindi television. She has been part of several notable projects, including Yeh Meri Family (2018), Kota Factory (2019), Special Ops (2020) and Jab We Matched (2023). In 2025, Pillai made her film debut with Odum Kuthira Chaadum Kuthira.

== Early life ==
Revathi Pillai was born on June 5, 2002, in Thane, Maharashtra, into a Malayali Nair family. Her parents, Manoj Pillai and Sheeja Pillai, are originally from Kerala. She is the youngest of three siblings, Gayatri and Nivedya.

== Career ==
Pillai made her acting debut in 2018 with the series Yeh Meri Family. Her first recognition came with the 2019 series Kota Factory. Following this Pillai appeared in more series: Butterflies, Special Ops, The Interns, Special Ops 1.5: The Himmat Story, Jab We Matched and Dil Dosti Dilemma.

Pillai made her film debut in 2025 with the Malayalam film Odum Kuthira Chaadum Kuthira, starring alongside Fahadh Faasil and Dhyan Sreenivasan. The film failed at the box office.

== Filmography ==
Key
†	Denotes films that have not yet been released

=== Films ===
Year	Title	Role	Language	Ref.
2025	Odum Kuthira Chaadum Kuthira	Revathi	Malayalam	

=== Web series ===
Year	Title	Role	Notes	Ref.
2018	Yeh Meri Family	Vidhya M. Ranganath		
2019-2024	Kota Factory	Vartika Ratawal	3 seasons	
2020	Butterflies	Jenny		
2020-present	Special Ops	Pari		
2020	The Interns	Viveka Chaturvedi		
2021	Special Ops 1.5: The Himmat Story	Pari		
2023	Jab We Matched	Reena	Episode: "Formula Sheet"	
2024	Dil Dosti Dilemma	Naina Kariappa		

== See also ==
- List of Indian film actresses
- List of Hindi film actresses
