= Love Aaj Kal (2020 film) =

2020 Indian film by Imtiaz Ali

- Theatrical release poster
- Directed by: Imtiaz Ali
- Written by: Imtiaz Ali
- Produced by: Dinesh Vijan; Imtiaz Ali
- Starring: Kartik Aaryan; Sara Ali Khan; Randeep Hooda; Arushi Sharma
- Cinematography: Amit Roy
- Edited by: Aarti Bajaj
- Music by: Songs: Pritam; Score: Ishaan Chhabra
- Production companies: Maddock Films; Window Seat Films; Reliance Entertainment; Jio Studios
- Distributed by: Pen Studios
- Release date: 14 February 2020 (India)
- Running time: 141 minutes
- Country: India
- Language: Hindi
- Budget: ₹50 crore
- Box office: est. ₹52.6 crore

Love Aaj Kal (Note: Also known as Love Aaj Kal 2020) is a 2020 Indian Hindi-language romantic comedy-drama film directed by Imtiaz Ali and starring Kartik Aaryan and Sara Ali Khan in lead roles, with Randeep Hooda and Arushi Sharma in pivotal supporting roles. Principal photography began in the first half of March 2019 and ended in July 2019. It was released in India on Valentine's Day 2020.

It is the spiritual successor to the 2009 film of the same name also directed by Ali, starring Khan's father Saif Ali Khan and Deepika Padukone.

== Plot ==
Zoe and Veer meet at a bar. The two get attracted and agree for a One-night stand. Just as they were making out, Veer stops Zoe from continuing. He tells her that the time is not right. Zoe leaves infuriated. Veer keeps following Zoe, who finally confronts him and asks him not to follow her.

There is a flashback scene where Leena and Raghuvendra "Raghu" Singh have the same conversation back in Udaipur.

Back to the present day, Veer drops her for an interview at the office of the Mehta Group, and they slowly begin their relationship. Raj, who is affiliated with the Mehta Group, is an ex-medical student who ran away from Udaipur and now owns several restaurants in Delhi, including the café at which Zoe hangs out very often. Raj, who is good friends with Zoe, tells her the story of his childhood sweetheart, Leena, implying that he is a grown-up Raghu. He tells her that he used to behave with Leena just as Veer acts with Zoe, recites his childhood memories with Leena to Zoe, and tells her how he asked Leena for a dance together.

Again in a flashback, it is seen that Raghu and Leena used to meet each other secretly and how Raghu left everything for Leena and moved for her to Delhi, discontinuing his studies to be with Leena. Later, Zoe walks in on Raj and a woman, assuming she is Leena but realizes it's not the case. Raj now reveals that he left Leena for his big town fantasies. Her mother convinces Zoe that she can't possibly have both her love and career together. She goes to meet Veer's parents but leaves crying. Veer relays to Raj what Zoe did, and Raj, convinced that he influenced Zoe towards behaving this way, responds by getting her the job.

Some days later, Zoe sees Veer with another girl. Heartbroken, she hangs out with multiple people but doesn't happen to like any of them. She goes to a bar with a guy and gets drunk, but he refuses to drop her at her home. Veer picks her and drops her at her house. He says that he can't enter a relationship of compromises with Zoe and breaks up with her. The next day he informs her about a new job in the Himalayas and is leaving for two years, explaining that he has as much right to be focused on his career as does she, and bids her goodbye. Zoe gets a proposal from the Mehta family for marriage, but she refuses. When Zoe meets Raghu, he tells her that he met Leena one last time, when he realized he lost the person he was before with Leena and finds that she is pregnant. He leaves from there, gets into a cab, and goes to the airport. He adds that he still misses Leena but is helpless now. He starts crying, and Zoe comforts him. Raghu tells her that she shouldn't make the same mistake he made. Zoe leaves for the Himalayas to reunite with Veer. She sees Veer sleeping outside. She goes and lays on top of him. She says that she won't balance between love & work ever, but still, she wanted to be with him. Veer asks whether she will leap with him, to which she agrees, and they reunite.

== Cast ==
- Kartik Aaryan in a dual role as
  - Veer Taneja, Zoe's boyfriend
  - Raghuvendra "Raghu" Singh
    - Randeep Hooda as Raj, who in reality is revealed to be an adult Raghu
- Sara Ali Khan as Zoe Chauhan, Veer's girlfriend
- Arushi Sharma as Leena Gupta, Raghu's ex-love interest
- Siddharth Shaw as Mr. Rathore
- Simone Singh as Mrs. Chauhan, Zoe's mother
- Siddharth Kak as Harshwardhan Mehta
- Pranati Rai Prakash as Office Girl
- Kavita Ghai as Mrs. Taneja, Veer's mother
- Shataf Figar as Mr. Taneja, Veer's father
- Vedika Haralalka as Lily, Zoe's friend
- Monika Panwar as Sweety

== Production ==
On 17 January 2019, it was reported that Imtiaz Ali was considering his next venture (a romantic drama) with Kartik Aaryan and Sara Ali Khan. On 1 March 2019, it was confirmed that the pair has been teamed up in a directorial venture of Ali and the filming will start in Delhi.

The principal photography of the film began in the second week of March 2019, with Aaryan sharing a picture of Khan and him from the sets. Khan also shared the picture on her social media account. The first schedule of the film was wrapped on 25 March 2019. To inform about the conclusion of the schedule, Khan posted a video on her Instagram account to celebrate. The 20-day second schedule of the film began on 10 April in Udaipur. Filming was completed on 1 July 2019, after the final 66 days of shooting in Himachal Pradesh.

== Music ==
The film's songs are composed by Pritam, with lyrics written by Irshad Kamil and the album was well received by the audiences. Every soundtrack in the album has its own flavour and emotion which was used as the narrative.

The film score was composed by Ishaan Chhabra. The film variant of the reprise version of "Shayad" is sung by Jubin Nautiyal, released April 2021.

In the film credits the song "Aur Tanha" is entitled "Tanna Karta" and song "Shayad" sung by Arijit Singh for Pre-Interval and Jubin Nautiyal for Post-Interval.

The song "Shayad (Aaj Kal)" also sung by Pritam featuring Arijit Singh by title "Shayad (Aaj Kal) Lockdown Version" uploaded on Pritam's YouTube Channel. All songs under label Sony Music India.

== Release ==
Love Aaj Kal was released in India on 14 February 2020. The film was made available for streaming on Netflix on 28 April 2020.

== Reception ==
=== Critical response ===
On the review aggregator website Rotten Tomatoes, 20% of 15 critics' reviews are positive, with an average rating of 4/10.

Ronak Kotecha of the Times of India rated the film 3/5, stating that "the flashback story is interrupted way too many times to accommodate the film's non-linear narrative." Baradwaj Rangan of Film Companion wrote, "Despite its many imperfections, if there's one thing that gladdened me about LAK-2020, it's that IA hasn't lost his ability to write those great scenes we want (and expect) from him."

=== Box office ===
Love Aaj Kal earned ₹120 million (US$1.3 million) nett at the domestic box office on its opening day. On the second day, the film collected ₹70 million (US$750,000). On the third day, the film collected ₹7 crore (US$750,000), taking its total opening weekend collection to ₹260 million (US$2.8 million) nett.

As of 13 March 2020, with a gross of ₹417 million (US$4.5 million) in India and ₹109.8 million (US$1.2 million) in overseas, the film has a worldwide gross collection of ₹52.6 crore.
