= Odum Kuthira Chaadum Kuthira =

2025 Indian film by Althaf Salim

- Theatrical release poster
- Directed by: Althaf Salim
- Written by: Althaf Salim
- Produced by: Ashiq Usman
- Starring: Fahadh Faasil; Kalyani Priyadarshan; Revathi Pillai
- Cinematography: Jinto George
- Edited by: Nidhin Raj Arol
- Music by: Justin Varghese
- Production company: Ashiq Usman Productions
- Distributed by: Central Pictures; AP International
- Release date: 29 August 2025
- Running time: 151 minutes
- Country: India
- Language: Malayalam

Odum Kuthira Chaadum Kuthira (transl. Galloping Horse, Jumping Horse) is a 2025 Indian Malayalam-language comedy film written and directed by Althaf Salim. It stars Fahadh Faasil, Kalyani Priyadarshan, Revathi Pillai, Dhyan Sreenivasan, Lal, Vinay Forrt and Suresh Krishna. It was produced by Ashiq Usman under Ashiq Usman Productions. Justin Varghese composed the film's music.

The film was released on 29 August 2025 and received negative reviews from critics and audiences. It was a box office bomb.

== Plot ==
Aby, a young man who works in a furniture showroom. One day, he meets and falls in love with Nidhi, who has a strange habit of seeing dreams and they are engaged to get married. A midnight before their wedding day, Nidhi comes to his house and tells him she had a dream about him on a white horse, so she tells him to come to the wedding on a white horse. Everything goes according to plan and the next day, Aby comes to the wedding on a white horse and then his friend Anuraj tells him that the horse is little strange and tricky which is so angry and the horse made Aby fall on the ground which sent Aby to coma. After more than 300 days, he wakes up and the mystery unfolds in unexpected ways. The rest of the movie shows how Aby and Nidhi reunite and get married.

== Cast ==
- Fahadh Faasil as Aby Mathew (Jibin Kuriakose)
- Kalyani Priyadarshan as Nidhi Sudhish (Voice-over by Sayanora Philip)
- Revathi Pillai as Revathi
- Dhyan Sreenivasan as Itty
- Lal as Mathew Thalachirayil, Aby's father
- Vinay Forrt as Siby Mathew, Aby's elder brother
- Anuraj O. B. as Anuraj
- Saaf as Rishi, Nidhi's ex-fiancee and lover
- Raffi as Dr. Rafi Kuttikattil
- Lakshmi Gopalaswamy as Malini
- Noby Marcose as Principal
- Vineeth Vasudevan as Vineeth Viswan
- Amith Mohan Rajeshwari as Home nurse
- Suresh Krishna as Sudhish Menon, Nidhi's father
- Vineeth Thattil David as Sadashivan Nair
- Sudheer Karamana as Divakaran Potti
- Gopu Kesav as Vishwanathan, Vineeth's father
- Idavela Babu
- Stephen Samuel as Association Secretary
- Sreekanth Vettiyar as Gilfred Lopez
- Athira Niranjana
- Varsha Ramesh as Dr. Varsha
- Riyas Narmakala
- Ranjini George as Mini, Revathi's mother
- Sreeja Menon as Nimmy, Nidhi's mother
- Ala S. Nayana
- Eithal Evana Sherin

== Production ==
Principal photography began on 29 April 2024 in Ernakulam. The filming continues in Chennai. The final schedule shoot began on 9 December 2024 at Bengaluru. Film shooting in Bengaluru took place at Whitefield's Delhi Public School and Nexus Shantiniketan Mall.

== Release ==
=== Theatrical ===
Odum Kuthira Chaadum Kuthira was released on 29 August 2025 coinciding Onam festival.

=== Distribution ===
Central Films acquired the distribution of the film in Kerala and AP International bagged the rights for the rest of India release.

=== Home media ===
The post theatrical streaming rights of the film have been acquired by Netflix and started releasing on September 26th. The satellite rights of the film is owned by Asianet.

== Reception ==
The film received mostly negative reviews from critics.

The Times of India described the film as "an incohesive rom-com," criticising the lack of chemistry between the leads and noting that "every single character… seems to be written in with a mental disorder, without explanation." The reviewer rated it 1.5 out of 5. The Indian Express called it "2025’s most disappointing Malayalam film," arguing that Fahadh Faasil was ill-suited for the role and that his comedic attempts felt contrived. The review described the film as an "empty vessel" lacking emotional depth or chemistry.

India Today described the film as "an absurd romantic comedy that struggles to find its footing," stating that "even Fahadh Faasil isn't able to elevate it" and warning that it "bores you so much that you contemplate walking out of the theatre." The Week similarly criticised the film as "unfunny, disjointed and messy," stating that Fahadh Faasil was "miscast" in the lead role. The Hindu noted the film's attempt at absurdist comedy but found it ultimately unsuccessful, calling it a "quirky experiment that rarely lands."
