= Friday Night Plan =

2023 Indian drama film

- Official release poster
- Directed by: Vatsal Neelakantan
- Written by: Vatsal Neelakantan
- Produced by: Farhan Akhtar; Ritesh Sidhwani; Kasim Jagmagia
- Starring: Juhi Chawla; Babil Khan; Ninad Kamat
- Cinematography: Krish Makhija
- Edited by: Charu Takkar
- Music by: Songs: Dhruv Vishvanath; Skrat; When Chai Met Toast; Background Score: Rahul Pais; Nariman Khambata (The Jamroom)
- Production company: Excel Entertainment
- Distributed by: Netflix
- Release date: 1 September 2023
- Running time: 109 minutes
- Country: India
- Language: Hindi

Friday Night Plan is a 2023 Indian Hindi-language coming-of-age comedy-drama film written and directed by Vatsal Neelakantan. It was produced by Farhan Akhtar and Ritesh Sidhwani, under Excel Entertainment, along with Kasim Jagmagia. It starred Juhi Chawla along with Babil Khan, Amrith Jayan, Aadhya Anand, Ninad Kamat, Ria Chaudhary, Aditya Jain, and Medha Rana. It released directly on Netflix, on 1 September 2023 to mixed reviews.

== Synopsis ==
Two arguing brothers get together to attend the year's hottest party covertly before their mother returns from a business trip.

== Cast ==
- Juhi Chawla as Mrs. Menon, Sid and Adi's mother
- Babil Khan as Siddharth "Sid" Menon
- Amrith Jayan as Aditya "Adi" Menon
- Aadhya Anand as Nitya "Nits" Sabharwal
- Medha Rana as Natasha "Nat" Sabharwal
- Ninad Kamat as SI Suhas Pingale
- Ria Chaudhary
- Aditya Jain as Kabir
- Rishabh Joshi
- Abhishek Ranjan
- Vyom Vyas

== Soundtrack ==
Friday Night Plan

Soundtrack album by Dhruv Vishvanath Skrat When Chai Met Toast
- Released: 23 August 2023
- Recorded: 2022–2023
- Genre: Feature film soundtrack
- Length: 9:00
- Language: Hindi
- Label: Zee Music Company
External audio
- Video on YouTube

The music of the film is composed by Dhruv Vishvanath, Skrat and When Chai Met Toast while sung by singers including Piyush Kapoor, When Chai Met Toast and others. The soundtrack was curated by Music Supervisors Sandesh Rao and Rahul Kannan.

No.	Title	Lyrics	Music	Singer(s)	Length
1.	"Bahaane"	Siddhant Kaushal	Dhruv Visvanath	Rahul Pais	3:01
2.	"Pandora Ka Dabba"	Piyush Kapoor	Skrat	Piyush Kapoor	1:59
3.	"Mazey Mein"	Siddhant Kaushal	When Chai Met Toast	When Chai Met Toast	2:27
Total length:					9:00

== Reception ==
Professional ratings
Review scores
Source	Rating
CNBC TV18	NA
The Free Press Journal	2.5/5 stars
Hindustan Times	NA
The Indian Express	2.5/5 stars
India Today	2.5/5 stars
Leisure Byte	3/5 stars
NDTV	2.5/5 stars
News18	4/5 stars
The New Indian Express	2.5/5 stars
OTTPlay	3/5 stars
Pinkvilla	2.5/5 stars
Rediff.com	3/5 stars
Scroll.in	NA
The Hindu	NA
The Quint	3/5 stars
The Times of India	3/5 stars
The Tribune (Chandigarh)	3/5 stars
Times Now	4/5 stars

On the review aggregator website Rotten Tomatoes, 54% of 13 critics' reviews are positive, with an average rating of 5.6/10.
