= The Railway Men =

Indian streaming television series

- Genre: Historical; Disaster; Thriller
- Created by: Shiv Rawail
- Written by: Aayush Gupta
- Directed by: Shiv Rawail
- Starring: R. Madhavan; Kay Kay Menon; Divyenndu; Babil Khan
- Music by: Sam Slater
- Original language: Hindi
- No. of episodes: 4

Production
- Executive producers: Aditya Chopra; Uday Chopra; Yogendra Mogre; Akshaye Widhani
- Cinematography: Rubais
- Editor: Yasha Jaidev Ramchandani
- Running time: 51–65 minutes
- Production company: YRF Entertainment

Original release
- Network: Netflix
- Release: 18 November 2023

The Railway Men: The Untold Story of Bhopal 1984 is a 2023 Indian Hindi-language historical disaster thriller television miniseries about railway workers who saved many lives during the 1984 toxic gas leak at the chemical company Union Carbide India Limited's plant in Bhopal. It is produced by YRF Entertainment (the streaming division of Yash Raj Films) and stars R. Madhavan, Kay Kay Menon, Divyenndu and Babil Khan. Sunny Hinduja and Juhi Chawla play supporting roles.

Filmed from December 2021 to May 2022, all four episodes of the miniseries were released on Netflix on 18 November 2023.

== Premise ==
The Railway Men is based on railway workers who saved many lives during the 1984 gas tragedy at the chemical company Union Carbide India Limited's plant in Bhopal. The series is inspired by the efforts of station master Ghulam Dastagir and his team at the Bhopal Junction railway station on the night of the tragedy.

== Cast ==
=== Main ===
- R. Madhavan as Rati Pandey, the general manager of the Central Railway zone of the Indian Railways
- Kay Kay Menon as Iftekaar Siddiqui, the station master of the Bhopal Junction railway station
- Divyenndu as Balwant Yadav, a robber masquerading as a police constable
- Babil Khan as Imad Riaz, an inexperienced loco pilot

=== Recurring ===
- Sunny Hinduja as Jagmohan Kumawat, a journalist; the role is loosely inspired by Rajkumar Keswani, who played a key role in reporting the incident and its aftermath
- Juhi Chawla Mehta as Rajeshwari Janglay, a principled Railways Ministry bureaucrat, DG Personnel of Railways
- Dibyendu Bhattacharya as Kamruddin, a manager at Union Carbide
- Philip Rosch as Madsen, the American head of the plant
- Denzil Smith as railway minister
- Raghubir Yadav as a train guard
- Mandira Bedi as Rajbir Kaur, a Sikh woman
- Connor Keene as Alex Braun, a German scientist
- Sunita Rajwar as Vijaya, a cleaning woman
- Manish Wadhwa as Mirza
- Shrikant Verma as Ishwar Prasad
- Nivedita Bhargava as Imad's mother
- Annapurna Soni as Shazia, Ansari's widow
- Bhumika Dube as Nafisa, Kamruddin’s wife
- Thanu Khan as Markhand
- Aditya Shukla as Ratlu
- Priya Yadav as Sohini, Vijaya’s daughter
- Rahul Tewari as Benedict
- Mushtaq Khan as Railway Yard Man
- Abhinav Grover as Adil

== Episodes ==
No.	Title	Directed by	Written by	Original release date
1	"Episode 1"	Shiv Rawail	Aayush Gupta	18 November 2023
Employees at the Union Carbide India Limited work under negligible safety protocols. Imad Riaz, a former employee, talks to a journalist, Kumawat, about the death of his friend at the plant due to toxic gas inhalation. He says that the management took no action and fired him instead for complaining. A manager at the plant, Kamruddin, also tries to give information to Kumawat about the lack of safety at the crumbling plant. Meanwhile, Iftekaar Siddiqui is an idealistic station master of the Bhopal Junction railway station. A dacoit named Balwant Yadav intent on looting the station safe-house introduces himself to Iftekaar as a cop in pursuit of the dacoit. On the night of 2 December 1984, due to malfunctioning instruments and untrained workers at the plant, a highly toxic gas Methyl isocyanate (MIC) leaks into the atmosphere, instantly killing many workers, including Kamruddin.
2	"Episode 2"	Shiv Rawail	Aayush Gupta	18 November 2023
As the gas starts spreading into the highly populated Bhopal city, hordes of people begin to collapse in the streets, many of whom die. At Bhopal Junction station, Iftekaar and Balwant are initially confused by the chaos. They soon realise that people who were indoors were seemingly unharmed. They try to gather the crowds into the station waiting room. Due to incomplete cable repair work, communication systems are down, and Iftekaar has no way to reach nearby stations and warn them. Imad, who had begun a new job as a loco pilot, becomes aware of the gas leak due to his past history. He goes to the station to warn Iftekaar. Meanwhile, at Itarsi Junction, Rati Pandey, a general manager for the Indian Railways, becomes aware of the situation.
3	"Episode 3"	Shiv Rawail	Aayush Gupta	18 November 2023
Rati tries to persuade DG (Personnel) Rajeshwari Janglay to take action and send help to the people stranded in Bhopal. However, her pleas are neglected by her superiors. Rajeshwari entrusts Rati to disobey the orders and help them anyway. Rati inspires several railway workers to help him in the cause, and they set off towards Bhopal. At Bhopal Junction, Iftekaar, Imad, and Balwant find their own way to rescue people trapped at the station by putting them in a goods train. Meanwhile, Madsen, the American head of the plant, refuses to provide any help. A German scientist, Alex Brau, who seemingly has an antidote to MIC is thwarted in his effort by both the Indian Government and Union Carbide.
4	"Episode 4"	Shiv Rawail	Aayush Gupta	18 November 2023
Unable to warn them, a train with 1000 passengers makes its way towards Bhopal Junction. The train is delayed due to anti-Sikh rioters. Meanwhile, Rati and his workers make their way towards the junction as well. Iftekaar and Imad find a way to avoid a collision, but Imad dies due to inhalation. After helping the people board the rescue train, Iftekaar too seemingly dies. Balwant retrieves his key to steal money from the vault. Rati helps the survivors with medical supplies, and it is revealed that Rajeshwari and he are married. Meanwhile, Kumawat, appalled at the disaster, begins documenting the event through photographs. On the next day, rescue trains carry many survivors away from the city. At a makeshift graveyard, thousands of bodies are seen to be buried and burnt. Iftekaar, like a few others who were pronounced dead, wakes up. Balwant has a change of heart, and returns the money. In 1996, twelve years after the tragedy, Kumawat revisits Bhopal, and sees that long-term effects of the disaster are still being felt.

== Production ==
The Railway Men marked the directorial debut of Shiv Rawail, who was an assistant director at Yash Raj Films. It also marked the first streaming fiction series of the company, under their subdivision YRF Entertainment.

The series began filming on 1 December 2021 and wrapped on 11 May 2022.

== Soundtrack ==
No.	Title	Lyrics	Music	Singer(s)	Length
1.	"Nindiya"	Kausar Munir	Sanchit and Ankit Balhara	Supriya Pathak, Atharv Bakshi	3:47
2.	"Nindiya" (Reprise)	Kausar Munir	Sanchit and Ankit Balhara	Ayushmann Khurrana	3:50

== Release ==
Two former employees of Union Carbide India Limited, convicted in the gas leak case, filed a plea to prevent the release of the series; the Bombay High Court rejected their case.

The series was released on Netflix on 18 November 2023.

== Reception ==
Nandini Ramnath of Scroll.in found The Railway Men to be a "compelling saga of ordinary heroism"; she particularly praised the production design by Rajat Poddar for his "remarkably faithful recreations" of the era. Sonil Dedhia of News18 considered it a "passionate, emotionally resonant, and incredibly moving" tale of under-appreciated heroes, but felt that too many subplots and backstories prevented it from being a "taut thriller". Mayur Sanap of Rediff.com commended Rawail for handling the tragic event with "seriousness and respect without going overboard with the dramatic impact".

The Indian Express's Shubhra Gupta termed it "a worthy effort, which brings back an expansive, old-fashioned style of storytelling to a still-relevant event", and particularly praised the performances of Kay Kay Menon and Babil Khan. India Today's Zinia Bandyopadhyay considered Khan to be the "real star of the show". Saibal Chatterjee of NDTV wrote, "The Railway Men is buoyed by a clutch of laudable performances and storytelling that does not slide below a certain level of competence. But it could have been much, much more." Santanu Das of Hindustan Times believed that the series's handling of the tragedy was not at par with the handling of the Chernobyl disaster by the HBO miniseries Chernobyl (2019).
