= Dono (film) =

2023 film by Avnish Barjatya

- Theatrical release poster
- Directed by: Avnish S. Barjatya
- Written by: Avnish S. Barjatya; Manu Sharma
- Story by: Avnish S. Barjatya
- Produced by: Kamal Kumar Barjatya; Rajkumar Barjatya; Ajit Kumar Barjatya
- Starring: Rajveer Deol; Paloma Dhillon
- Cinematography: Chirantan Das
- Edited by: Shweta Venkat Mathew
- Music by: Songs: Shankar–Ehsaan–Loy; Background Score: George Joseph
- Production companies: Rajshri Productions; Jio Studios
- Distributed by: Pen Marudhar Entertainment; Yash Raj Films
- Release date: 5 October 2023
- Running time: 156 minutes
- Country: India
- Language: Hindi
- Box office: ₹70 lakh

Dono (transl. Both) is a 2023 Indian Hindi-language romantic drama film directed by debutant Avnish S. Barjatya, son of Sooraj R. Barjatya, and written by Avnish S. Barjatya and Manu Sharma. It is jointly produced by Rajshri Productions and Jio Studios. The film stars newcomers, Rajveer Deol and Paloma Dhillon.

The cinematography is done by Chirantan Das. The music is composed by Shankar–Ehsaan–Loy, and the lyrics are written by Irshad Kamil. The film was released on 5 October 2023.

== Plot ==
Dev Saraf is a Computer Software Engineer who runs his startup in Bengaluru. He is living a quiet but challenging life as the owner of a software startup in its initial tough phase, away from his family in Mumbai, where his mother and father live.

One day, Dev gets a phone call from his mother informing him of Alina Jaisingh's upcoming wedding, a destination wedding in Thailand. She says she will be at the wedding along with Dev's father and encourages Dev also to attend. Dev has known Alina since they were in high school. His close friendship, and a lot more than that, has lasted more than ten years. He has harbored deeply romantic feelings for her but has so far struggled to express them to her all these years. He is devastated by this news.

He is dismayed when Alina herself calls him and invites him. Hearing Dev’s lame excuse, Alina makes it clear that he is not allowed to skip her wedding under any pretext. She scolds him with love, warning him, “I won't even get married if you fail to show up'. Dev is numb at the realization that these invitations are genuine, and he does not know how to react. Coincidentally, right at that moment, he hears a famous TV talk show host, Anjali Malhotra, advising an unknown male listener in an identical situation, to “go and attend the wedding to get a 'closure' and move on”.

Dev is next seen at the airport to catch a flight to Bangkok.

Meghna Doshi is a twenty-something girl living with her parents, whose family gets an invitation to the same wedding. Meghna is in a similar, but not exactly one-sided, situation. She has just suffered a heartache having broken up with her boyfriend, Gaurav, after a six-year relationship. Gaurav is a close friend of the bridegroom, Nikhil Kothari, as well as the best man at the ceremony.

Meghna has to face Gaurav for the first time after their break-up! But unlike in Dev's situation, Meghna's parents know about her love, her break-up, and everything. They try to discourage her from attending since 'Gaurav will definitely be there'. But she refuses, saying that she is not a 'child' . Shortly Meghna is seen arriving at the same wedding.

Upon arrival, Dev finds himself surrounded by hundreds of wedding guests in nothing short of a ‘mini-Rajasthan’, recreated in a posh hotel by the beach in Hua Hin.

Dev's and Meghna's very first encounter at the hotel is literally with these words... "Hi I am Dev, a friend of the Dulhan... Hi I am Meghna, a friend of the Dulha".

Subsequently, the two find themselves being thrust by the elders on both sides into performing various roles in the wedding, even if they were too shy to offer themselves. The fairy-tale-like location and the magical multi-day pre-Shaadi ceremonies, activities such as ceremonially adorning Rajasthani turbans on the guests, and even the crazy Cricket match between the bride's side and the groom's side, all make them meet each other, again and again.

One of the fun events that the youngsters at the wedding secretly plan without the knowledge of the parents for a few hours, is a 'Proposal Event’. While on a taxi ride to that event, Meghna forgets her purse at the taxi and within it, is the ‘city permit’ to hold the event. Gaurav tries to humiliate Meghna, in front of everyone, apparently for forgetting to bring the permit in the taxi. But a few minutes later, Dev, who rode the same taxi, arrives and quickly defuses the situation and saves Meghna from humiliation.

This bitter incident and Dev’s help make them open to each other. They share their own crazy personal situations in the present context, viz, two people who have lacked the confidence to speak for themselves for years. Dev tells Meghna that she deserves better, and Dev's words mark a turning point for Meghna. They also discover something connecting each other.

Dev participates in a pre-Shaadi dance event featuring Alina and Nikhil, and he suffers a (cinematically) sudden, lack of confidence to continue to stay till the end of the wedding and asks his agent to book his return ticket. When returning to their respective rooms for the night, Meghna says good night asking him to meet her the next day at the Haldi ceremony. But Dev, fighting back emotions, says that he is leaving for India the same night! This time Meghna says, 'It is your courage that brought you here. Now show enough courage to continue to stay through this. Don't go!'.

Being wanted by a girl for the first time and being asked to stay on has a positive effect on Dev. An energized Dev is seen the next morning at the Haldi ceremony, enjoying himself as well as the new feelings for Meghna, who also reciprocates her feelings for him.

In the climax, as the bride and the groom take their steps around the sacred fire and everyone showers them with flower petals, Dev's and Meghna's hands are shown reaching for each other gently at first and later, tightly clutching.

In the epilogue, it is revealed that they are strongly committed to each other as well as their careers. They live in their respective cities for the time being, saving money for their wedding while maintaining a strong long-distance relationship. Dev’s business has picked up steam, and he is doing very well. They have a clear plan to get married and eventually live together in Bengaluru. They have discovered each other for life.

== Cast ==
- Rajveer Deol as Dev Saraf
  - Varun Buddhadev as Young Dev
- Paloma Dhillon as Meghna Doshi
- Aditya Nanda as Gaurav
- Kanikka Kapur as Alina Jaisingh Kothari
  - Muskan Kalyani as Young Alina
- Rohan Khurana as Nikhil Kothari
- Manik Papneja as Gopal "Gappu"
- Poojan Chhabra as Vilas Kothari
- Sanjay Nath as Jagmohan, Nikhil's father
- Micky Makhija as Dilip Saraf, Dev's father
- Mohit Chauhan as Ashok Jaisingh
- Tisca Chopra as Anjali Malhotra
- Gurdeep Punj as Shilpa Kothari

== Production ==
In March 2021, it was announced that Sooraj Barjatya's son Avnish Barjatya would be making his directorial debut with Dono. Rajveer Deol, son of actor Sunny Deol and Paloma Dhillon, daughter of actress Poonam Dhillon were cast as the leads, marking their acting debut.

== Soundtrack ==
Dono

Soundtrack album by Shankar–Ehsaan–Loy
- Released: 16 August 2023
- Recorded: 2022–2023
- Genre: Feature film soundtrack
- Length: 30:30
- Language: Hindi
- Label: Zee Music Company

Shankar–Ehsaan–Loy chronology
Samrat Prithviraj (2022)	Dono (2023)	Sam Bahadur (2023)

Official audio
- Dono - Full Album on YouTube

The songs are composed by Shankar–Ehsaan–Loy. The lyrics were written by Irshad Kamil. The film score is composed by George Joseph. The title track of the film was released by Salman Khan and Bhagyashree.

Track listing
No.	Title	Singer(s)	Length
1.	"Dono"	Armaan Malik	04:04
2.	"Aag Lagdi"	Siddharth Mahadevan, Lisa Mishra	3:19
3.	"Khamma Ghani"	Shivam Mahadevan, Shreya Ghoshal	2:52
4.	"Raangla"	Pratibha Singh Baghel, Shankar Mahadevan	4:31
5.	"Mann Mauji"	Javed Ali, Shrinidhi Gatate	3:43
6.	"Khatt Mitthiyaan"	Himani Kapoor	4:37
7.	"Lehenga Padd Gaya Mehenga"	Romy	3:20
8.	"Dono" (Reprise)	Armaan Malik, Shrinidhi Gatate	4:04
Total length:			30:30

== Release ==
=== Theatrical ===
It was released on 5 October 2023.

== Reception ==
A critic of Bollywood Hungama gave the film 3 out of 5 stars and noted, "Dono is a clean family entertainer and works due to its simplicity, relatable goings-on and some funny and emotional moments. At the box office, it’ll need a strong word of mouth to attract its target audience." Ganesh Aaglave of Firstpost gave the film 3 out of 5 stars and noted, "Dono is a modern-day love story, which works well because of its fresh writing. The story will find relevance among the youth but the stretched runtime of over two-and-a-half hours plays a bit spoiler. The film is visually appealing."

Sonil Dedhia of News18 India gave the film 3 out of 5 stars and noted, "With Dono, Avnish gives Bollywood romance a simple yet interesting love story. The film is much too long, though. There is a noticeable dip just before the interval and things tend to get convenient. The film delivers decent entertainment and leaves you with a smile at the end of it." Deepa Gahlot of Rediff.com gave the film 2 out of 5 stars and noted, "With Dono, Avnish has slowly dragged the story a few miles over the boundary into the territory of contemporary lifestyle. There are no great emotional highs or lows in the film. It is just made up of little moments of normal interactions between young people."
