= A Gift of Love: Sifar =

2019 film

- Directed by: Dhruv Sachdev
- Produced by: Durgesh Paul, Zero Begins Films
- Starring: Sudha Chandran; Mushtaq Khan; Anang Desai; Kanikka Kapur; Varun Narula
- Release date: 29 November 2019
- Country: India
- Language: Hindi

A Gift of Love: Sifar is a Hindi film, based on The Gift of the Magi by O Henry. Directed by Dhruv Sachdev and produced by Zero Begins Films in association with PvR Pictures. SIFAR went on to bag 30 awards in the festival circuit with 15 Best Picture Awards, 9 Best Director Awards and 3 Best Actress Awards.

== Cast ==
- Sudha Chandran
- Mushtaq Khan
- Anang Desai
- Kanikka Kapur
- Varun Narula
- Sanjay Deyali

== Plot ==
Ayesha is an author, having a dark past. She is in discussion with her therapist – Dr Roy who is curious to know more about Ayesha's past. During one of the therapy sessions, Ayesha agrees and narrates the love story of a gangster and a courtesan.

== Soundtrack ==
A Gift of Love: Sifar

Soundtrack album by Anurag Mohn
- Genre: Feature film soundtrack
- Language: Hindi

The soundtrack of A Gift of Love: Sifar consists of two songs both composed, programmed and sung by Anurag Mohn, the lyrics of which have been written by Shraddha Bhilave, Puneet Arjun Rai and Anurag Mohn.

Tracklist
No.	Title	Lyrics	Music	Singer(s)	Length
1.	"Aa Tujhe Odh Lun"	Puneet Arjun Rai	Anurag Mohn	Anurag Mohn	4.05
2.	"Sabse Buraa"	Shraddha Bhilave,Anurag Mohn	Anurag Mohn	Anurag Mohn	3:50
Total length:					18:03

== Awards and recognition ==
- Best Indie Feature at Los Angeles Film Awards
- Outstanding Achievement Award at Berlin Flash Film Festival
- Best Feature of the month at CKF International Film Festival May 2019
- Outstanding Achievement Award at Calcutta International Cult Film Festival August 2019
- Best Debut Filmmaker at Cult Critic The Film Magazine May 2019
- Outstanding Achievement Award at MWIFF Mahul Woods International Film Festival May 2019
- Best Debut Filmmaker at ’Age d’Or International Art-house Film Festival (LIAFF) May 2019
- Best Producer at Gold Movie Awards June 2019
- Feature Film at Miami Independent Film Festival June 2019
