= Dry Day =

2023 Indian film

- Official Release poster
- Directed by: Saurabh Shukla
- Written by: Saurabh Shukla
- Produced by: Nikkhil Advani; Monisha Advani; Madhu Bhojwani
- Starring: Jitendra Kumar; Shriya Pilgaonkar; Annu Kapoor
- Cinematography: Adri Thakur
- Edited by: Kunal Walve
- Music by: Protijyoti Ghosh; Javed–Mohsin
- Production company: Emmay Entertainment
- Distributed by: Amazon MGM Studios (via Amazon Prime Video)
- Release date: 22 December 2023
- Running time: 128 minutes
- Country: India
- Language: Hindi

Dry Day is a 2023 Indian Hindi-language comedy drama film written and directed by Saurabh Shukla. It stars Jitendra Kumar, Shriya Pilgaonkar and Annu Kapoor. It is produced by Nikkhil Advani Under Emmay Entertainment.

It released directly on Amazon Prime Video on 22 December 2023.

== Plot ==
Gannu, an alcoholic, protests against alcohol in his town after his wife threatens to abort their child. Despite his ties to a political figure, Dauji, Gannu gains support, turning Dauji into an adversary. In the chaos, Gannu discovers purpose in saving his unborn child.

== Cast ==
- Jitendra Kumar as Gannu
- Shriya Pilgaonkar as Nirmala
- Annu Kapoor as Dauji
- Jagdish Rajpurohit as Head master
- Abhishek Srivastava as Chainta
- Sakshi Malik as Chunnibai
- Sunil Palwal as Satto
- Padmesh Krishna Tiwari as Jagat
- Aditya Sinha as Kunne
- Akash Mahamana as Gajendra Singh
- Priyanka Meena as Manjali Bhabhi

== Reception ==
Dhaval Roy of The Times of India rated 3 stars out of 5 said The movie was enjoyable at times, but it might have been more captivating. Still, because of its unique vibe and the small-town setting it creates, it is a fun one-time viewing. Saibal Chatterjee of NDTV criticises the film and said Jitendra Kumar seems at ease with his surroundings. For him, it ought to have been an easy task. However, the writing gives him a limited number of cliches to work with, so all the part permits him to sell is meaningless babble.

Deepa Gahlot of Rediff.com gave 2.5 stars out of 5 and said "Dry Day has an appealing feeling of purpose and honesty.". Nandini Ramnath write in the Scroll.in that Jitendra Kumar comes to the rescue with a character that first captures the audience's attention but ultimately loses it, much like the film itself. He does this by using his talent at portraying obdurate, cussed males.
