= Jitendra Kumar =

Indian actor (born 1990)

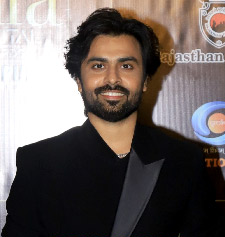
- Kumar in 2025
- Born: 1 September 1990 (age 36); Khairthal, Rajasthan, India
- Education: Indian Institute of Technology Kharagpur
- Occupation: Actor
- Years active: 2008–present

Jitendra Kumar (born 1 September 1990) is an Indian actor who primarily works in Hindi films and web series. Kumar is best recognised for his portrayal of Jitu in TVF Pitchers, Jeetu Bhaiya in Kota Factory and Abhishek Tripathi in Panchayat. His notable films include Shubh Mangal Zyada Saavdhan (2020), Jaadugar (2022) and Dry Day (2023). Kumar has received several awards including two Filmfare OTT Awards.

== Early life ==
Kumar was born on 1 September 1990 into a middle-class family in Khairthal town, of Alwar district (now in Khairthal-Tijara district) in Indian state of Rajasthan.

Kumar did his schooling until the ninth grade in his hometown, Khairthal. Later on, due to his father's job transfer, he did his tenth grade schooling in Sikar, where he topped the class. Then, he moved to Kota for two years for Joint Entrance Examination (JEE) preparation to secure admission in one of the Indian Institutes of Technology. He did his primary and secondary schooling in Hindi-medium schools. He cleared the JEE in Hindi also.

== Career ==
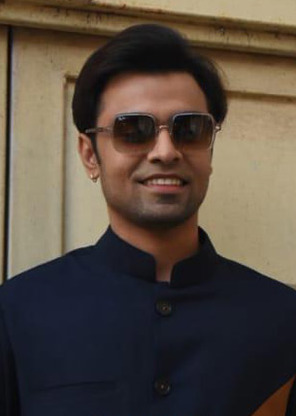
Kumar in 2020

While studying civil engineering at IIT Kharagpur, Kumar started liking acting. Jitendra Kumar has done many stage plays as the Governor of the Hindi Technology Dramatics Society at the IIT where he met Biswapati Sarkar, Executive Creative Director and Writer at The Viral Fever who eventually invited him to join TVF in 2012.

Kumar starred in Munna Jazbaati: The Q-tiya Intern in 2013 which instantly went viral and crossed 3 million views. Since then, he has portrayed several characters in TVF videos which includes Tech Conversations With Dad, A Day With, TVF Bachelors, Kota Factory and many others.

Apart from TVF videos on YouTube, Kumar has played a few significant roles in comedy sketches, movies and web series. He is predominantly famous for his character Jitendra Maheshwari, a frustrated corporate employee from TVF Pitchers, Gittu, a confused bridegroom from Permanent Roommates and Jeetu Bhaiya from Kota Factory. He made his film debut with Shuruat Ka Interval in 2014.

In 2020, he was seen as Aman Tripathi in Shubh Mangal Zyada Saavdhan opposite Ayushmann Khurrana and then he played Billu in Chaman Bahaar.

Kumar's most notable role came with the series Panchayat, where he portrayed Abhishek Tripathi, a young urban secretary of a Panchayat office in the village Phulera, Uttar Pradesh. The series has been expanded to four seasons and received positive responses. Tanisha Bagchi of The Quint noted, "It’s refreshing to see Jitendra Kumar on screen every time. Kumar portrays Abhishek’s frustration with such ease that we can’t help but feel for this young guy who had to leave a bustling metro and make a desolate and gloomy panchayat office his home." The series earned him Filmfare OTT Awards for Best Actor – Comedy Series and Best Actor Critics – Comedy Series.

== Filmography ==
Key
†	Denotes films that have not yet been released

=== Films ===
Year	Title	Role	Notes	Ref.
2014	Shuruaat Ka Interval	Laxman		
2019	Gone Kesh	Srijoy Roy		
2020	Shubh Mangal Zyada Saavdhan	Aman Tripathi		
2020	Chaman Bahaar	Prem "Billu" Kumar Yadav		
2022	Jaadugar	Meenu Narang		
2023	Dry Day	Gannu		
2024	Lantrani	Babu Kamar		
2025	Bhagwat: Chapter One – Raakshas	Sameer / Rajkumar / Suraj	ZEE5 film	
2026	Mirzapur	Vinay "Bablu" Pandit		
2026	Dalimb	Suraaj	Zee 5 film	

=== Web series ===
Year	Title	Role	Notes	Ref.
2014	Permanent Roommates	Prateek		
2015	TVF Pitchers	Jitendra "Jeetu" Maheshwari		
2017	TVF Bachelors	Jeetu	Season 2	
2017	Bisht, Please!	Girish Goyal		
2017	F.A.T.H.E.R.S.	Jeetu		
2018	Mr. & Mrs.	Viren	Season 1	
2019	ImMature	Drama Teacher		
2019	TVF Tripling	Himself	Season 2	
2019	Humorously Yours	RJ Mastikhor Mishra		
2019	Cheesecake	Neel		
2019–2024	Kota Factory	Jeetu Bhaiya		
2020–present	Panchayat	Abhishek Tripathi		
2025	Bada Naam Karenge	Santosh "Sunny" Khandelwal	Special appearance	

=== Music video ===
Year	Title	Singer	Ref.
2024	Tu Hi Tu	Mohammad Faiz	

== Awards and nominations ==
Year	Award	Category	Work	Result	Ref.
2020	Filmfare OTT Awards	Best Actor (Comedy Series)	Panchayat	Won	
2022	22nd Indian Television Academy Awards	Popular Actor - OTT	Panchayat	Nominated	
2022	22nd Indian Television Academy Awards	Popular Actor - OTT	Kota Factory	Nominated	
2022	Filmfare OTT Awards	Best Actor in a Series (Male): Drama	Kota Factory	Nominated	
2022	Filmfare OTT Awards	Best Actor in a Series (Male), Critics: Comedy	Panchayat	Won	
2023	Bollywood Hungama Style Icons	Most Stylish Emerging Icon	—N/a	Nominated	
2024	Filmfare OTT Awards	Best Actor in a Series (Male): Comedy	Panchayat	Nominated	
2024	Filmfare OTT Awards	Best Actor in a Series (Male): Drama	Kota Factory	Nominated	
