= Yeh Meri Family =

2018 Indian web series

- Promotional poster for season 1 released by TVF
- Genre: Drama; Comedy
- Created by: Sameer Saxena
- Written by: Saurabh Khanna
- Directed by: Sameer Saxena
- Creative directors: Saurabh Khanna; Anandeshwar Dwivedi
- Starring: Mehul Solnki; Mona Singh; Akarsh Khurana; Ahan Nirban; Ruhi Khan; Prasad Reddy; Rajesh Kumar; Juhi Parmar; Hetal Gada; Anngad Raaj; Veena Mehta
- Music by: Vaibhav Bundhoo; Rohit Sharma
- Opening theme: "Yeh Meri Family" by Vaibhav Bundhoo and Kavya-Kriti
- Country of origin: India
- Original language: Hindi
- No. of seasons: 4
- No. of episodes: 22

Production
- Executive producer: Arun Kumar
- Cinematography: Dhirendra Shukla
- Editor: Gourav Gopal Jha
- Running time: 25–42 minutes
- Production company: Contagious Online Media Network

Original release
- Network: TVF Play; Amazon Mini TV
- Release: 12 July 2018 – 16 August 2024

Yeh Meri Family (transl. This Is My Family) is an Indian comedy drama web series, created and directed by Sameer Saxena for The Viral Fever. The script was written by Saurabh Khanna, as his first writing project. The series follows the life of a 12-year-old Harshu Gupta, played by Vishesh Bansal, in Jaipur, Rajasthan in the late 1990s. It also stars Mona Singh, Akarsh Khurana, Ahan Nirban, Ruhi Khan, Prasad Reddy, as members of the Gupta family and their acquaintances.

The first season of the Yeh Meri Family, consisting of seven episodes, premiered on TVFPlay and YouTube on 12 July 2018; it has also been available on Prime Video and Amazon Mini TV.

The series was renewed for a second season, set in a different family and time, which streamed on Amazon Mini TV. It was further renewed for a third and fourth season, maintaining continuity from the settings of the second season. The fourth season premiered on 16 August 2024.

== Plot ==
The first season is set in Jaipur, Rajasthan in the year 1998, the series follows the story told from the point of view of the 12-year-old Harshu Gupta and his family, the various trials and tribulations experienced in their day-to-day lives.

The second season tells the story of 15-year-old Ritika amidst the chaos of the Awasthi family, with the following seasons continuing this plot.

== Cast ==
=== Season 1 ===
==== Main ====
- Vishesh Bansal as Harshal "Harshu" Gupta, the series' 12-year-old narrator.
- Mona Singh as Poorva Gupta, Harshu's mother.
- Akarsh Khurana as Devendra Gupta, Harshu's father.
- Ahan Nirban as Devansh "Dabbu" Gupta, Harshu's elder brother.
- Ruhi Khan as Dhwani "Chitti" Gupta, Harshu's younger sister.
- Prasad Reddy as Shanky, Harshu's best friend.

==== Other ====
- Revathi Pillai as Vidhya M. Ranganath, Harshu's love interest. Rivathi had also played as Varteeka in Kota Factory.
- Brij Bhushan Shukla as Verma Sir, Harshu's Hindi teacher.
- Nishaad Javeri as Rita Miss
- Mazda Taraporewala as Darpan
- Rajiv Kachroo as Vidhya's father
- Abhay Pannu as Laxy

=== Season 2–4 ===
==== Main ====
- Hetal Gada as Ritika Awasthi
- Anngad Raaj as Rishi Awasthi
- Rajesh Kumar as Sanjay Awasthi
- Juhi Parmar as Neerja Awasthi
- Veena Mehta as Ritika and Rishi's Grandmother

==== Other ====
- Sarwam Kulkarni as Vaibhav
- Avtar Vaishnani as Aashu Awasthi
- Supavitra Babul as IPS Vijay Awasthi
- Sangeetha Balachandran as Principal
- Pravin Waghmare as Rickshaw wala
- Nishkarsh Dixit as Dabloo

== Episodes ==
Season	Episodes	Originally released	
Season	Episodes	First released	Last released
1	7	July 12, 2018	July 20, 2018
2	5	May 19, 2023	
3	5	April 4, 2024	
4	5	August 16, 2024	

=== Season 1 (2018) ===
No. overall	No. in season	Title	Original release date
1	1	"Pukam Pukai"	July 12, 2018
Harshu intends to take full advantage of the summer holidays, but his plans for fun are derailed when his mother wants him to take Hindi tuitions.
2	2	"Vish Amrit"	July 12, 2018
Looking forward to heading out to celebrate his birthday with friends, Harshu is furious when his mother organizes a party at home instead.
3	3	"The 12th Man"	July 20, 2018
Worried that his dad is uncool, Harshu is embarrassed when he comes to school. During Dabbu’s cricket match, Harshu is in for a big surprise.
4	4	"Posham Pa"	July 20, 2018
Sick of playing second fiddle to Dabbu, Harshu discovers a secret that could finally taint his older brother's spotless record as the perfect son.
5	5	"Kacchi Ghodi"	July 20, 2018
A big fight between their parents leaves Harshu and Dabbu attempting to keep the peace at home, but chaos re-erupts when Chitti goes missing.
6	6	"Chupan Chupai"	July 20, 2018
Befuddled by Shanky’s pointers on wooing Vidhya, Harshu wants to take a more direct approach, but fears that rejection may be too much to handle.
7	7	"Chiddiya Ud"	July 20, 2018
With Dabbu leaving for college, Harshu can't wait to be the oldest kid at home, but not without a few last sibling spats and some brotherly love.

=== Season 2 (2023) ===
No. overall	No. in season	Title	Original release date
8	1	"Apna Kamra"	May 19, 2023
9	2	"Party"	May 19, 2023
10	3	"Cable TV"	May 19, 2023
11	4	"Parent Teacher Meeting"	May 19, 2023
12	5	"Blank Call"	May 19, 2023

=== Season 3 (2024) ===
No. overall	No. in season	Title	Original release date
13	1	"Same Pinch"	April 4, 2024
14	2	"Holi Hai"	April 4, 2024
15	3	"Tit for Tat"	April 4, 2024
16	4	"Happy Birthday"	April 4, 2024
17	5	"Moonchh"	April 4, 2024

=== Season 4 (2024) ===
No. overall	No. in season	Title	Original release date
18	1	"Independence Day"	August 16, 2024
19	2	"Manglu"	August 16, 2024
20	3	"Bhai Ho To Aisa"	August 16, 2024
21	4	"Heels"	August 16, 2024
22	5	"Dosti = Pyaar?"	August 16, 2024

== Production ==
The creator of The Viral Fever, Arunabh Kumar stated about the concept of making a family-drama series, as according to Arunabh, film and television shows had lacked a good concept of a family drama in the past 20 years, in which a story that everyone can relate to. He wanted to bring the dynamics of the quintessential India family, which was the main core concept of the show. It was set in the 1990s as Arunabh stated that the time period was very organic because "just like the family relationships, 90s had a certain innocence about them".

While Biswapati Sarkar, who worked in TVF's earlier projects was approached to write the script. The media's co-director Sameer Saxena, suggested Saurabh Khanna's name for the show. It was Saurabh's maiden attempt in writing. Mona Singh was approached to play the role of Vishesh Bansal's mother, while Akarsh Khurana made his acting debut with the series. Arunabh chose the background to be set in Jaipur as he found the city was neither too urban nor too rural. It's a very appropriate representation of the middle-class India, for which it gave the show a very suitable backdrop.

Arunabh also noted about directing with kids, as he stated "Before we went on floor, I was skeptical about shooting with the kids. I thought it would be very challenging. But to my surprise, all the kids were extremely hard working and dedicated. They always used to come on set all prepared with the lines and that made the shoot a lot easy. Rehearsing with them during the pre-production stage also helped to prepare them well for the shoot. Saxena said that he was skeptical about shooting with the kids before the show went on the floor."

== Soundtrack ==
Yeh Meri Family

Soundtrack album by Vaibhav Bundhoo, Rohit Sharma, Simran Hora, Nilotpal Bora, Ishan Das
- Released: 22 July 2018
- Genre: Soundtrack
- Length: 28:07
- Language: Hindi
- Label: The Viral Fever
External audio
- Audio Jukebox on YouTube

The series' soundtrack album is composed by Vaibhav Bundhoo, Rohit Sharma, Simran Hora, Nilotpal Bora and Ishan Das with lyrics written by Hussain Haidry, Vaibhav Bundhoo, Swapnil Tiwari and Manoj Kumar Nath.

Tracklist
No.	Title	Lyrics	Music	Singer(s)	Length
1.	"Aisi Hai Hawa"	Hussain Haidry, Vaibhav Bundhoo	Vaibhav Bundhoo	Udit Narayan	02:51
2.	"Yeh Meri Family"	Vaibhav Bundhoo	Vaibhav Bundhoo	Vaibhav Bundhoo, Kavya-Kriti	01:37
3.	"Bhoolein Na Hum"	Hussain Haidry	Vaibhav Bundhoo	Shashwat Singh	02:00
4.	"Maa"	Vaibhav Bundhoo	Vaibhav Bundhoo	Vaibhav Bundhoo, Archana Dosija, Nigah Mallya and Simran Hora	02:42
5.	"Devi(L) Maa"	Swapnil Tiwari	Rohit Sharma	Rinku Giri	02:20
6.	"Shararatein"	Swapnil Tiwari	Rohit Sharma	Arun Dev	03:00
7.	"Mere Mehram"	Manoj Kumar Nath	Simran Hora	Javed Ali	04:05
8.	"Dil Ki Baaton Mein"	Swapnil Tiwari	Rohit Sharma	Arun Dev	02:58
9.	"Dhaaga"	Hussain Haidry	Nilotpal Bora, Ishan Das	Nilotpal Bora	03:52
10.	"Yeh Khwaab Hai"	Vaibhav Bundhoo	Vaibhav Bundhoo	Vaibhav Bundhoo	02:39
Total length:					28:07

== Release ==
The Viral Fever announced four new series on 23 June 2018, with Yeh Meri Family being one of them. The official trailer was presented by TVF through their YouTube channel on 28 June 2018. The first two episodes of the series was released simultaneously through TVF Play and YouTube on 12 July 2018. The remaining episodes were later released on 20 July 2018. It has since been made available for streaming on Amazon Prime Video. The second season was released on Amazon miniTV on 18 May 2023. The third season released on 4 April 2024, with the fourth season releasing on 16 August 2024.

== Reception ==
Yeh Meri Family opened to positive response from critics, who appreciated the series' use of nostalgia and the performances of the cast. Firstpost critic Shreya Paul, wrote in her review stating that "With a strong cast and seemingly strong content, Yeh Meri Family may surprise audiences with its ordinary brilliance." Writing for Scroll.in, Sowmya Rao stated "Yeh Meri Family's strong point is the way it captures the essence of the ’90s, a time when India was on the cusp of economic, social and cultural change. That conflict between old and new infused an inter-generational dynamic exclusive to that era, which is aptly reflected in Harshu's relationship with his parents." Rahul Desai of Film Companion wrote "Yeh Meri Family becomes a series that doesn't demand our complete attention. It occasionally counts on the fact that we can drift away, recall similar observations from our own heydays and seamlessly return to the household as an organic extension of those memories."
