= Biswapati Sarkar =

Indian script writer (born 1988)

- Born: 22 September 1988 (age 38); Rourkela, Odisha
- Education: IIT Kharagpur, Delhi Public School, Rourkela
- Employer: Posham Pa Pictures
- Notable work: Kaala Paani; Fighter; Jaadugar; TVF Pitchers; Panchayat; Adarsh Baal Vidyalaya
- Spouse: Kalpana Garg

Comedy career
- Genres: comedy, drama

Biswapati Sarkar is an Indian screenwriter and producer working with Posham Pa Pictures, a production house he co-founded with Sameer Saxena, Amit Golani and Saurabh Khanna. Sarkar previously worked as the executive creative director and writer at The Viral Fever (TVF).

He is also known as 'Arnub' for of his parody of Arnab Goswami in his YouTube sketch series Barely Speaking with Arnub. In his series, various celebrities have been featured as guests, such as Shahrukh Khan, Ranveer Singh, Parineeti Chopra, Ali Zafar, Sunny Leone, Arvind Kejriwal, Nawazuddin Siddiqui, Anil Kapoor and Chetan Bhagat.

He is also the writer of web series such as Kaala Paani, TVF Pitchers and Permanent Roommates and films like Jaadugar and Fighter.

== Biography ==
Biswapati Sarkar was born in Rourkela, Odisha, to a Bengali family. He is an IIT Kharagpur, Statistics MSc graduate. He began his career working as a script writer and later became an integral part of TVF which was founded by his college senior Arunabh Kumar. He was the one who invited Jitendra Kumar to join TVF in 2012. His first video on TVF as a writer was "Rowdies - Sab Q-tiyapa hai!".

Sarkar was previously the executive creative director of TVF and was involved in the creation of most of their early work.

== Films and web series ==
| Year | Title | Worked as | Role | Notes |
|---|---|---|---|---|
| 2013 | Chai Sutta Chronicles | Actor | Self | Web series by TVF |
| 2014 | The Making Of.... | Writer & Director | | Web Series |
| 2014 | Permanent Roommates | Writer | | Web Series |
| 2014 | Shuruat Ka Interval | Writer | | Web Series |
| 2015 | Barely Speaking With Arnub | Writer & Actor | Arnub (spoof of Arnab Goswami) | Web Series |
| 2015 | TVF Pitchers | Writer & Actor | Puneet | Web Series |
| 2016 | Baaghi | Actor | Hari | Film |
| 2017 | Bisht Please! | Actor & Director & Writer | Vardhan | Web Series |
| 2017 | Son Of Abish | Actor | Self | Web Series |
| 2018 - 2020 | Mr & Mrs | Actor & Writer | Sanju | Web Series |
| 2018 | Ayan | Writer | | Short Film |
| 2018 | Kanika | | Cameo Role | Short Video |
| 2019 | Hostel Daze | Actor | Ram Kishor Chaubisi (The xerox shop owner) | Web series |
| 2019 | Cargo | Actor | Ramchandra Negi | Film |
| 2019 | Arjun Patiala | Actor | Editor | Film |
| 2019 | ImMature | Actor | Hindi Teacher | Web Series |
| 2020 | Panchayat | Actor | Prateek | Web Series |
| 2022 | Home Shanti | Producer | | Web Series |
| 2022 | Jaadugar | Writer & Producer | | Film |
| 2023 | Kaala Paani | Writer & Producer | | Web Series on Netflix |
| 2024 | Fighter | Additional Dialogue Writer | | Film |
| 2024 | Maamla Legal Hai | Producer | | Web Series on Netflix |
| 2025 | Logout | Writer | | Film |
| 2026 | Adarsh Baal Vidyalaya | Creator & Actor | Web Series | Amazon Prime |
| 2026 | Daayra | Commissioner Anand | Film | |
