= Pavan Sadineni =

Indian film director and screenwriter

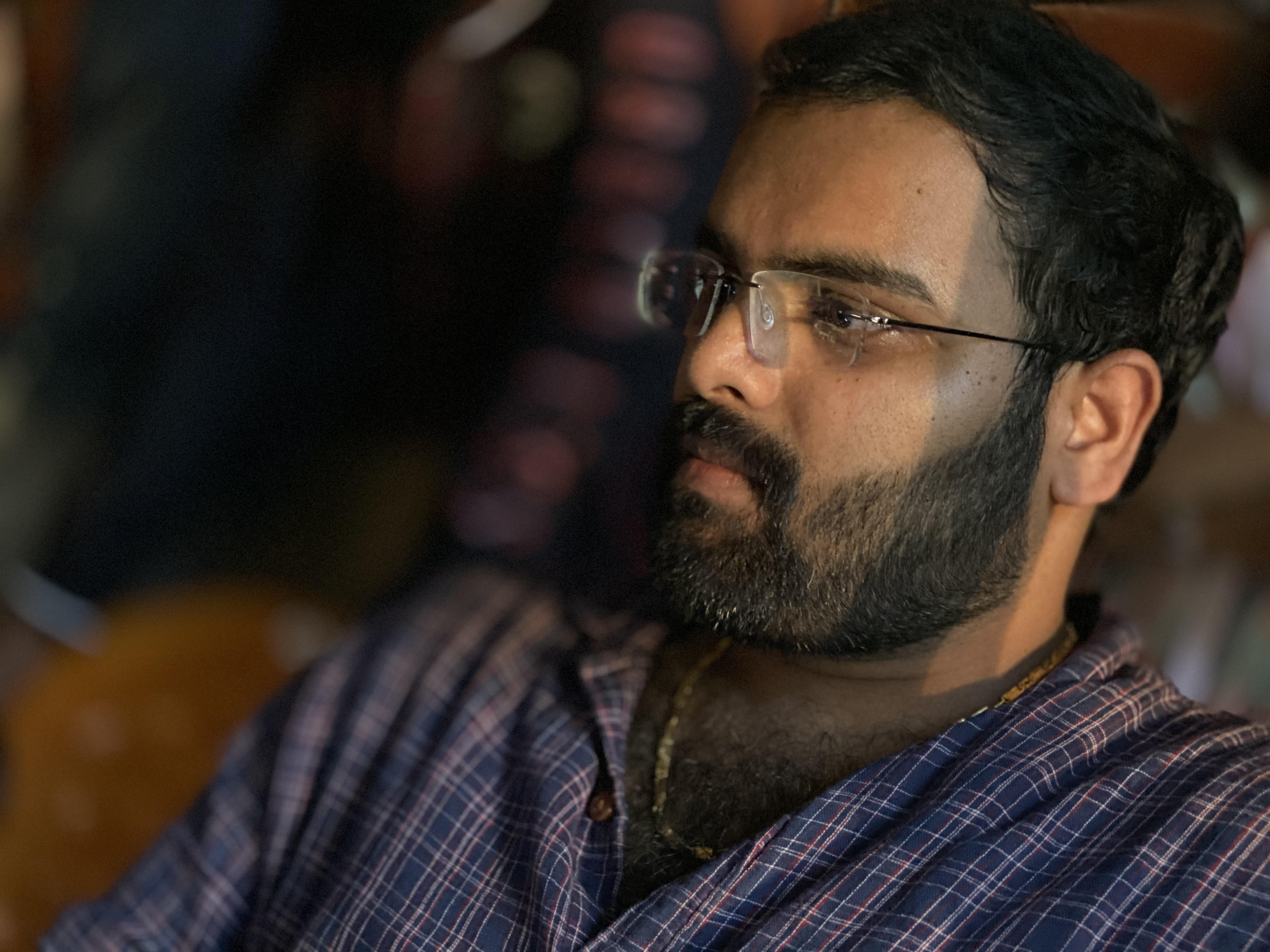
- Born: Pavan Kumar Sadineni; Vijayawada, Andhra Pradesh
- Education: M.S., Computer Science
- Occupations: Director, Writer
- Years active: 2013 - Present

Pavan Sadineni is a film director and screenwriter associated with Telugu cinema. His directorial credits include films Prema Ishq Kaadhal (2013), Savitri (2016) and Senapathi (2021). Additionally, he has directed web series PillA (2017), Ee Office Lo (2018), Commitmental (2020), and Dayaa (2023).

== Career ==
In the early stages of Sadineni's career, he directed several short films, including Interview, Love Formula 31 and Bewars. Pavan has directed a total of ten short films, with his debut work titled Toorpu Padamara.

In 2013, Sadineni directed the film Prema Ishq Kaadhal as his debut. It is a romantic comedy film, featuring Harshvardhan Rane, Harish Varma, Sree Vishnu, Ritu Varma, Vithika Sheru and Sree Mukhi in lead roles. In 2014, he directed Savitri featuring Nanditha and Nara Rohit. In 2017, he directed a mini web series titled PillA, a science fiction thriller starring Dhanya Balakrishnan.

In 2018, Pavan directed Ee Office Lo, a new-age drama with Chaitanya Krishna and Rakendu Mouli as leads.

In 2020, Pavan directed Commitmental, a romantic comedy and a remake of Hindi Web-series Permanent Roommates.

On 31 December 2021, Senapathi, directed by Sadineni, was released in Aha. This is a remake of the Tamil film 8 Thottakkal.

In 2023, he directed Dayaa, a remake of Taqdeer.

== Awards ==
Pavan was awarded Best Director of a Series by the OTT Play Awards 2023 for Dayaa.

== Filmography ==
=== As director ===
Films
Year	Title
2013	Prema Ishq Kaadhal
2016	Savitri
2021	Senapathi
2026	Aakasamlo Oka Tara

Web-Series
Year	Title
2017	PillA
2018	Ee Office Lo
2020	Commitmental
2023	Dayaa

=== As writer ===
Web-Series
Year	Title
2024	Paruvu

== Awards ==
=== For The Best Director ===
Year	Movie	Award
2023	Dayaa	OTT Play Awards
