= Alitho Saradaga =

Indian Telugu-language television talk show

- Genre: Talk-show
- Developed by: Ravi Nair
- Written by: Avinash Bandaru (season 1); Sarath (season 1); Manohar (season 1); Sarath Solo (season 2)
- Directed by: Kadiyala Anil
- Presented by: Ali (Note: Raghu Karumanchi have co-presented the episode 1–23 of season 1. Suma Kanakala hosted the 315th episode of season 1.)
- Voices of: RCM Raju
- Country of origin: India
- Original language: Telugu
- No. of seasons: 2
- No. of episodes: 317

Production
- Executive producer: Paindla Srinu
- Producer: Kadiyala Praveena
- Production locations: Hyderabad, India
- Cinematography: Vijay (season 1); Babu (season 1); Pachha Madhu (season 1); Sridhar Kollipara (season 2)
- Editors: Ramesh Ramayya (season 1); Naresh Jaavaaji (season 1–2)
- Camera setup: Multi-camera
- Running time: 35–59 minutes
- Production company: Gnapika Entertainments

Original release
- Network: ETV
- Release: 24 October 2016 – 21 May 2024

Alitho Saradaga (transl. Fun with Ali) was an Indian Telugu-language television talk show hosted by Ali and produced by Gnapika Entertainments. The show was primarily broadcast on ETV. The show premiered on the television on 24 October 2016. First season was ended on 19 December 2022. Second season was premiered on 5 March 2024 and was ended rather abruptly on 21 May 2024.

Kadiyala Praveena is the primary producer of the show. It was one of the popular and the longest-running talk-shows of Indian television.

== Season 1 (2016–2022) ==
=== 2016 ===
No. overall	No. in season	Guest(s)	Date of Broadcast	Ref.
1	1	Lakshmi Manchu	24 October	
2	2	Sunil	31 October	
3	3	Krishna Bhagavan, Raghu Babu	7 November	
4	4	Sumanth	14 November	
5	5	Priyamani	21 November	
6	6	Varun Sandesh, Vithika Sheru	28 November	
7	7	Allari Naresh	5 December	
8	8	Nikhil, Nandita Swetha	12 December	
9	9	Annapoorna, Sri Lakshmi	19 December	
10	10	Vandemataram Srinivas, Mano	26 December	

=== 2017 ===
No. overall	No. in season	Guest(s)	Date of Broadcast	Ref.
11	11	Ram Gopal Varma	2 January	
12	12	Uttej, Jhansi	9 January	
13	13	Sunitha	16 January	
14	14	Rajiv Kanakala, Sameer	23 January	
15	15	Babu Mohan, Y. Vijaya	30 January	
16	16	Posani Krishna Murali	6 February	
17	17	Suma Kanakala	13 February	
18	18	Jaya Prakash Reddy	20 February	
19	19	Kota Srinivasa Rao	27 February	
20	20	Prudhvi Raj, Rajitha	6 March	
21	21	Venu Madhav	13 March	
22	22	Santha Kumari	20 March	
23	23	Hema	27 March	
24	24	Meena	3 April	
25	25	Prema	10 April	
26	26	Varun Tej, Srinu Vaitla	17 April	
27	27	L. V. Revanth, Rohit	24 April	
28	28	Chandra Mohan, Rajya Lakshmi	1 May	
29	29	Murali Mohan	8 May	
30	30	Rallapalli Narasimha Rao, Jayalalita	15 May	
31	31	Aamani	22 May	
32	32	Bhanu Chander	29 May	
33	33	Anuradha, Abhinayasri	5 June	
34	34	Yamuna	12 June	
35	35	Satyanarayana	19 June	
36	36	Divyavani	26 June	
37	37	Giri Babu	3 July	
38	38	Geetanjali	10 July	
39	39	Shakeela	17 July	
40	40	Paruchuri Brothers	24 July	
41	41	S. P. Balasubrahmanyam (Part 1)	31 July	
42	42	S. P. Balasubrahmanyam (Part 2)	7 August	
43	43	Rakul Preet Singh	14 August	
44	44	Krishna Vamsi	21 August	
45	45	Raja Ravindra, Sithara	28 August	
46	46	Puri Jagannadh	4 September	
47	47	Sumalatha	11 September	
48	48	Khayyum, Siva Reddy	18 September	
49	49	Kavitha	25 September	
50	50	Geetha Madhuri, Nandu	2 October	
51	51	Venu, Dhanraj	9 October	
52	52	Ravi, Sreemukhi	16 October	
53	53	Hari Teja, Aadarsh Balakrishna	23 October	
54	54	Rajasekhar	30 October	
55	55	Rashmi Gautam	6 November	
56	56	Thagubothu Ramesh, Praveen	13 November	
57	57	Koti	20 November	
58	58	Swathi	27 November	
59	59	Gundu Hanumantha Rao, Ragini	4 December	
60	60	Saptagiri	11 December	
61	61	Jamuna	18 December	
62	62	R. P. Patnaik	25 December	

=== 2018 ===
No. overall	No. in season	Guest(s)	Date of Broadcast	Ref.
63	63	Catherine Tresa	1 January	
64	64	Chinna, Ramjagan & Subhalekha Sudhakar	8 January	
65	65	Namitha, Veerendra Chowdhary	15 January	
66	66	Brahmaji	22 January	
67	67	Archana Shastry	29 January	
68	68	Shruthi, Haritha	5 February	
69	69	Subhalekha Sudhakar, S. P. Sailaja	12 February	
70	70	Sundeep Kishan, Manjula Nigam	19 February	
71	71	Srikanth	26 February	
72	72	Sana Khan	5 March	
73	73	Indraja	12 March	
74	74	Rashi Khanna	19 March	
75	75	Raghu, Pranavi	26 March	
76	76	Roja Ramani	2 April	
77	77	Narasimha Raju	9 April	
78	78	Kousalya, Vijayalakshmi	16 April	
79	79	Suddala Ashok Teja	23 April	
80	80	Sangeeta	30 April	
81	81	Anita Chowdhary, Harsha Vardhan	7 May	
82	82	Tammareddy Bharadwaja	14 May	
83	83	Nalini	21 May	
84	84	Vedala Hemachandra, Sravana Bhargavi	28 May	
85	85	Sudha	4 June	
86	86	Pragathi	11 June	
87	87	Srinivasa Reddy, Siddhi Idnani	18 June	
88	88	Hyper Aadi, Getup Srinu	25 June	
89	89	Sanjjanaa Galrani	2 July	
90	90	Shakalaka Shankar, Sreedhar	9 July	
91	91	Rama Prabha	16 July	
92	92	Goreti Venkanna	23 July	
93	93	Mucherla Aruna	30 July	
94	94	Sushanth, Rahul Ravindran	6 August	
95	95	K. Sivasankar	13 August	
96	96	Supriya and Madhu Shalini	20 August	
97	97	Jayasudha	27 August	
98	98	Siva Krishna	3 September	
99	99	Varalakshmi	10 September	
100	100	Samantha Akkineni	17 September	
101	101	Anand	24 September	
102	102	Prabha	1 October	
103	103	Chitti Babu, Ananth Babu	8 October	
104	104	M. M. Srilekha	15 October	
105	105	Shiva Parvathi	22 October	
106	106	Manju Bhargavi	29 October	
107	107	Jyothi, Geetha Singh	5 November	
108	108	Ambika	12 November	
109	109	Krishnaveni	19 November	
110	110	Sulakshana	26 November	
111	111	Sundaram	3 December	
112	112	Mallikarjun, Gopika Poornima	10 December	
113	113	Latha	17 December	
114	114	Naresh	24 December	

=== 2019 ===
No. overall	No. in season	Guest(s)	Date of Broadcast	Ref.
115	115	Saritha	7 January	
116	116	Sneha	14 January	
117	117	Devadas Kanakala	21 January	
118	118	Subhashini	28 January	
119	119	Rohini	4 February	
120	120	Vijaya Lalitha	11 February	
121	121	Jayachitra	18 February	
122	122	Shekar	25 February	
123	123	Karate Kalyani, Rocket Raghava	4 March	
124	124	Prithvi Raj	11 March	
125	125	Priya Raman	18 March	
126	126	Ashok Kumar, Pradeep	25 March	
127	127	Malavika, N. C. Karunya	1 April	
128	128	Sampoornesh Babu	8 April	
129	129	Renu Desai	15 April	
130	130	Dubbing Janaki	22 April	
131	131	Preethi Nigam, Nagesh	29 April	
132	132	Raksha	6 May	
133	133	Sowcar Janaki	13 May	
134	134	Ramya Behara, Kalpana Raghavendar	20 May	
135	135	Vasuki (Assembly Rowdy fame 'Pakeezah')	27 May	
136	136	Vamsi Paidipally	3 June	
137	137	Sangeetha Krish	10 June	
138	138	Allari Subhashini, Suman Setty	17 June	
139	139	J. D. Chakravarthy	24 June	
140	140	Latha Sri	1 July	
141	141	S. P. B. Charan	8 July	
142	142	Teja	15 July	
143	143	Smitha	22 July	
144	144	Baba Bhaskar	29 July	
145	145	Naresh, Kartikeya Gummakonda	5 August	
146	146	Sumithra	12 August	
147	147	Raavi Kondala Rao	19 August	
148	148	Anantha Sriram	26 August	
149	149	L. B. Sriram	2 September	
150	150	Sanghavi	9 September	
151	151	Chalapathi Rao	16 September	
152	152	Laila	23 September	
153	153	Vineeth	30 September	
154	154	Jeevitha	7 October	
155	155	Ravi Babu	14 October	
156	156	Charan Raj	21 October	
157	157	K. Raghavendra Rao (Part 1)	28 October	
158	158	K. Raghavendra Rao (Part 2)	4 November	
159	159	Raasi	11 November	
160	160	Rahul Sipligunj, Punarnavi Bhupalam	18 November	
161	161	Chota K. Naidu	25 November	
162	162	Ramajogayya Sastry	2 December	
163	163	Sudigali Sudheer	9 December	
164	164	A. Kodandarami Reddy	16 December	
165	165	Sai Dharam Tej, Maruthi	23 December	
166	166	Kushboo Sundar	30 December	

=== 2020 ===
No. overall	No. in season	Guest(s)	Date of Broadcast	Ref.
167	167	Anjali	6 January	
168	168	Nandamuri Kalyan Ram	13 January	
169	169	Anil Ravipudi, Rajendra Prasad	20 January	
170	170	Suman	27 January	
171	171	Rajasree	3 February	
172	172	Varun Sandesh, Vithika Sheru	10 February	
173	173	B. Gopal	27 February	
174	174	Rekha Vedavyas	24 February	
175	175	Ravi Shankar	2 March	
176	176	Tulasi	9 March	
177	177	Pradeep Machiraju	16 March	
178	178	Sudheer Babu	23 March	
179	179	Kona Venkat	30 March	
180	180	Sivaji Raja	22 June	
181	181	Anup Rubens	29 June	
182	182	Suma Kanakala, Pradeep Machiraju	6 July	
183	183	Rashmi Gautam, Sudigali Sudheer	13 July	
184	184	Ram-Lakshman	20 July	
185	185	P. Sai Kumar, Aadi	27 July	
186	186	Jhansi, Sunitha Upadrashta	3 August	
187	187	K. S. Rama Rao	10 August	
188	188	Kasthuri	17 August	
189	189	Anasuya Bharadwaj	24 August	
190	190	Bandla Ganesh	31 August	
191	191	Priyadarshi Pulikonda	7 September	
192	192	Nikhil Siddharth	14 September	
193	193	Naveen Chandra	21 September	
194	194	S. V. Krishna Reddy	28 September	
195	195	Raj Tarun	5 October	
196	196	Satyadev	13 October	
197	197	V. V. Vinayak	19 October	
198	198	Varshini Sounderajan, Hyper Aadi	26 October	
199	199	Navdeep	2 November	
200	200	Himaja, Chalaki Chanti	9 November	
201	201	Archana	16 November	
202	202	Girish Pradhaan, Bhamidipati Sabita	23 November	
203	203	Kota Srinivasa Rao, Babu Mohan	30 November	
204	204	Suman, Bhanu Chander	7 December	
205	205	Raja	14 December	
206	206	Annapoorna, Y. Vijaya	21 December	
207	207	Sudha Chandran	28 December	

=== 2021 ===
No. overall	No. in season	Guest(s)	Date of Broadcast	Ref.
208	208	Tanikella Bharani	4 January	
209	209	Jackie, Haritha	11 January	
210	210	Siva Balaji, Madhumitha	18 January	
211	211	Shakeela, Anuradha	25 January	
212	212	Krishna Bhagavaan, Prudhvi Raj	1 February	
213	213	Suresh	8 February	
214	214	Hema, Sri Lakshmi	15 February	
215	215	Mumaith Khan	22 February	
216	216	Anand Sai, Vasuki Anand	1 March	
217	217	Jayalalita, Varalakshmi	8 March	
218	218	Sree Vishnu, Anil Ravipudi	15 March	
219	219	Naveen Polishetty, K. V. Anudeep (Cash Anudeep)	22 March	
220	220	Kartikeya Gummakonda, Lavanya Tripathi	29 March	
221	221	Banerjee, Jeeva	5 April	
222	222	Sekhar Kammula	12 April	
223	223	Dubbing Janaki, Krishnaveni	19 April	
224	224	Gautami	26 April	
225	225	Vishwak Sen	3 May	
226	226	Surekha Vani, Rajitha	10 May	
227	227	Paritala Nirupam, Paritala Manjula	17 May	
228	228	Navya Swamy, Srivani	24 May	
229	229	V. Vijayendra Prasad	31 May	
230	230	Baladitya, Kaushik	7 June	
231	231	Abhinaya Krishna, Auto Ram Prasad	14 June	
232	232	Preeti Nigam, Shruti	21 June	
233	233	Sadha	28 June	
234	234	Kamna Jethmalani	5 July	
235	235	Vijay Prakash, Mahathi	12 July	
236	236	Roja Ramani, S. Chakrapani	19 July	
237	237	S. Gopala Reddy	26 July	
238	238	K. S. Chithra	2 August	
239	239	Relangi Narasimha Rao	9 August	
240	240	Vanitha Vijayakumar	16 August	
241	241	Manchu Vishnu	23 August	
242	242	Indraja, Aamani	30 August	
243	243	Srinivas Avasarala	6 September	
244	244	Mano	13 September	
245	245	Chandrabose	20 September	
246	246	Mohan Babu (Part 1)	27 September	
247	247	Mohan Babu (Part 2)	4 October	
248	248	Prakash Raj	11 October	
249	249	Srinu Vaitla	8 November	
250	250	Nagineedu	15 November	
251	251	Niharika Konidela, Nikhil	22 November	
252	252	Brahmanandam (Part 1)	29 November	
253	253	Brahmanandam (Part 2)	6 December	
254	254	Srikanth, Poorna	13 December	
255	255	Aishwarya	20 December	
256	256	S. Thaman	27 December	

=== 2022 ===
No. overall	No. in season	Guest(s)	Date of Broadcast	Ref.
257	257	Tanikella Bharani (re-telecast of episode 208 as episode 257)	3 January	
258	258	Rajasekhar, Jeevitha	10 January	
259	259	Krithi Shetty, Kalyan Krishna	17 January	
260	260	Maheswari	24 January	
261	261	Sampath Raj	31 January	
262	262	Malavika	7 February	
263	263	Sriram	14 February	
264	264	Vinod Kumar Alva	28 February	
265	265	Venkat	7 March	
266	266	Satya Prakash	14 March	
267	267	Malashri	21 March	
268	268	Yamuna (Note: Additionally Varshika, Manoj and Bobby were also invited to promote their TV Series Mouna Poratam)	28 March	
269	269	Ali Reza, Amit Tiwari	4 April	
270	270	Subhashri	11 April	
271	271	Radhika Sarathkumar (Part 1)	18 April	
272	272	Radhika Sarathkumar (Part 2)	25 April	
273	273	Suma Kanakala	2 May	
274	274	Ram Gopal Varma, Naina Ganguly, Apsara Rani	9 May	
275	275	Adivi Sesh, Saiee Manjrekar	16 May	
276	276	Anil Ravipudi, Sunil	23 May	
277	277	Tharun Bhascker	30 May	
278	278	Sumanth Ashwin, M. S. Raju	6 June	
279	279	Akash Puri	13 June	
280	280	Kiran Abbavaram, Chandini Chowdary	20 June	
281	281	Gopichand, Maruthi	27 June	
282	282	Archana Shastry, Jagadeesh	4 July	
283	283	Regina Cassandra	11 July	
284	284	Venu Thottempudi, Sarath Mandava	18 July	
285	285	Jonnavittula Ramalingeswara Rao	25 July	
286	286	Suhas, Sandeep Raj	1 August	
287	287	Nikhil Siddhartha, Chandoo Mondeti	8 August	
288	288	Ashwini Dutt	15 August	
289	289	P. V. Sindhu	22 August	
290	290	Panja Vaisshnav Tej, Gireesaaya	29 August	
300	300	Singeetam Srinivasa Rao	5 September	
301	301	Sangeetha, Thiruveer, Kavya	12 September	
302	302	Muthyala Subbaiah	19 September	
303	303	Geetha	26 September	
304	304	Sonal Chauhan, Praveen Sattaru	3 October	
305	305	Allu Aravind (Part 1)	10 October	
306	306	Allu Aravind (Part 2)	17 October	
307	307	Prema, Narasimha Raju	24 October	
308	308	Santosh Sobhan, Faria Abdullah	31 October	
309	309	Allu Sirish	7 November	
310	310	Tulasi, Prabhas Sreenu	14 November	
311	311	Vakkantham Vamsi, Srividya	21 November	
312	312	Mani Sharma	28 November	
313	313	L. Vijayalakshmi	5 December	
314	314	Rahul Sipligunj, Syed Sohel	12 December	
315	315	Ali (Note: Host Suma Kanakala hosted this episode as a part of the finale. The main presenter, Ali was interviewed.)	19 December	

== Season 2 (2024) ==
=== 2024 ===
No. overall	No. in season	Guest(s)	Date of Broadcast	Ref.
316	1	Gopichand, A. Harsha	5 March	
317	2	Sivaji	12 March	
318	3	Pullela Gopichand, V. Chamundeswaranath	19 March	
319	4	Radha	26 March	
320	5	Murali Mohan, Maganti Roopa	2 April	
321	6	Anjali, Kona Venkat	16 April	
322	7	Venu Yeldandi, Dhanraj	23 April	
323	8	Kovai Sarala	7 May	
324	9	Kajal Aggarwal	14 May	
325	10	Laya	21 May	

== Home media ==
The show is primarily broadcast on ETV every Tuesday. It is also available on ''etvteluguindia'' YouTube channel. The show is available on ETV Win, a mobile app launched by ETV Network where all of its content is available.
