= Aakasamlo Oka Tara =

2026 Indian film by Pavan Sadineni

- Theatrical release poster
- Directed by: Pavan Sadineni
- Written by: Pavan Sadineni
- Screenplay by: Gunnam Gangaraju; Vasanth Jurru
- Story by: Pavan Sadineni; Vasanth Jurru
- Produced by: Sandeep Gunnam; Ramya Gunnam
- Starring: Dulquer Salmaan; Satvika Veeravalli; Shruthi Hassan
- Cinematography: Sujith Sarang
- Edited by: Praveen K. L.
- Music by: G. V. Prakash Kumar
- Production companies: Lightbox Media; Swapna Cinema; Geetha Arts
- Distributed by: Geetha Arts
- Release date: 20 November 2026
- Running time: 157 minutes
- Country: India
- Language: Telugu

Aakasamlo Oka Tara (transl. A star in the sky) or AOT is an 2026 Indian Telugu-language science fiction drama film directed by Pavan Sadineni and produced by Sandeep Gunnam and Ramya Gunnam, under Lightbox Media, while presented by Swapna Cinema and Geetha Arts. The film stars Dulquer Salmaan and debutant Satvika Veeravalli in the lead roles. The film has music composed by G. V. Prakash Kumar, cinematography handled by Sujith Sarang, and editing by Praveen K. L..

The film released theatrically on 20 November 2026 and received highly positive reviews from both critics and audience alike with praise for the cast performances (particularly Dulquer and Satvika), writing, G. V. Prakash Kumar's music, and technical aspects.

== Cast ==
- Dulquer Salmaan as Krishna
  - Aakash Srinivas as young Krishna
- Satvika Veeravalli as Kalpana
  - Maanyata Patnam as young Kalpana
- Shruti Haasan as Rohini
- Ruhani Sharma as Bijili
- Swasika as Saraswati, Krishna's sister
- Murali Sharma as Shankar Narayan
- Gautham Vasudev Menon as Dean Viswanath
- Nassar as Space Expo Teacher
- Praveen as Ramesh, Krishna’s friend
- Rajkumar Kasireddy as Vasu, Krishna’s friend
- Kota Jayaram as Kalpana’s father
- Manasi Sudhir as Kalpana’s mother
- Chaitanya Jonnalagadda as Madhavan, Rohini’s assistant
- Chinni Jayanth as Professor Prakash
- Vasu Inturi as College Broker
- Rajshri Nair as Aggarwal Foods Owner
- Madhunandan as School Teacher
- RJ Kajal as School Teacher
- Nandagopal as DRDO Officer
- Mahesh Achanta as Krishna’s co-driver
- Lavanya Reddy as Vimala, Vasu’s wife

== Production ==
The film was officially announced on 28 July 2024, coinciding with Dulquer Salmaan's 41st birthday, by production house Swapna Cinema. Pavan Sadineni, who previously directed films like Prema Ishq Kaadhal (2013), Savitri (2016), and the web series Dayaa, was signed on to direct the film. The film will be produced by Sandeep Gunnam and Ramya Gunnam.

In 2 February 2025, a puja ceremony was held in Hyderabad to launch the film's production, with Satvika Veeravalli confirmed to play the female lead.

== Release ==
Aakasamlo Oka Tara was theatrically released on 20 November 2026. The post-theatrical digital streaming rights of the film were acquired by Netflix.

== Reception ==
=== Critical response ===
Shreya Varanasi of The Times of India gave 3.5/5 stars and wrote "Despite its shortcomings, Aakasamlo Oka Tara makes for a satisfying watch, largely because of its performances and straightforward storytelling. Its simple tale of ambition, hope, dreams and quiet love offers a refreshing change of pace among recent Telugu cinema releases." 123telugu.com gave 3.5/5 stars and wrote "On the whole, Aakasamlo Oka Tara is a beautiful tale of aspirations, love, and sacrifice that is brought to life in full glory by the delightful performances of Dulquer Salmaan and debutant Satvika Veeravalli. There are plenty of lovely moments between the lead pair that leave a lasting impression. Well-written dialogues, good music, and neat direction are other assets of the film. The VFX work and limited exploration of the space portions are drawbacks in this otherwise solid and meaningful film. Go for it."

Latha Srinivasan of NDTV gave 3/5 stars and wrote "Of course, Pavan Sadineni's story is predictable and does not offer many surprises. Akasamlo Oka Tara is a family entertainer that celebrates the power of dreams and the emotional strength of relationships, reminding us that sometimes having someone believe in us can make all the difference." Sangeetha Devi Dundoo of The Hindu wrote "Starring Dulquer Salmaan, newcomer Satvika Veeravalli and Shruti Haasan, this underdog tale is told with enough conviction to make us root for its characters rather than dwell on its predictability. The writing, performances and technical craft come together to deliver one of the best Telugu films in recent times."

Sruthi Ganapathy Raman of The Hollywood Reporter India said in a review of the film, "Pavan Sadineni’s feel-good drama is well-intentioned in its aim to reach for the stars, even as a well-rounded emotional core remains just out of reach."
