= CommitMental =

Indian web series

- Genre: Comedy; Romance
- Based on: Permanent Roommates
- Developed by: Biswapati Sarkar
- Directed by: Pavan Sadineni
- Starring: Udbhav Raghunandan; Punarnavi Bhupalam
- Country of origin: India
- Original language: Telugu

Production
- Producer: Allu Aravind
- Production companies: The Viral Fever (TVF); Tamada Media

Original release
- Network: aha
- Release: 13 November 2020

CommitMental is an Indian Telugu-language romantic comedy web series created by The Viral Fever (TVF) for Aha. It is directed by Pavan Sadineni starring Udhbav Raghunanda and Punarnavi Bhupalam in lead roles. This series revolves around a young couple, Anu and Phani, who after being in a long-distance relationship for three years, face the prospect of marriage. It premiered on Aha on 13 November 2020. It is the remake of 2014–2016 Hindi-language web series Permanent Roommates.

== Plot ==
CommitMental follows the story of commitment-wary Anu, and Phani, her overeager long-distance boyfriend who returns to India from the United States of America to surprise Anu and to ask her to marry him. Acting upon the advice of her roommate and her own reluctance to marry someone who barely knows her, Anu refuses, but gives in to Phani's persistence. The two eventually strike a compromise, opting to move in together first. The subsequent events- a fallout, followed by a conciliation, and Anu's premarital pregnancy end in the two of them planning their wedding, with unforeseen consequences.

== Cast ==
- Punarnavi Bhupalam
- Udbhav Raghunandan
- Sivannarayana Naripeddi
- Vishnu Oi
- Venkatesh Kakumanu
- Namrata Tipirneni
- TNR
- Sai Swetha
- Jabardasth Apparao
- Raj Mudiraj
- Dinesh Koushika

== Episodes ==
Episode	Title	Directed by	Written by	Date of Broadcast
1	"The Proposal"	Pavan Sadineni	Biswapati Sarkar	13 November 2020
Phani returns to India from United States of America and puts across a marriage proposal towards Anu, with whom he's had a long distance relationship for the last three years, but Anu is still in two minds about accepting or rejecting his proposal.
2	"The Room"	Pavan Sadineni	Biswapati Sarkar	13 November 2020
Phani wants to marry Anu, but Anu believes he is rushing things. So both of them try to reach a conclusion by having a discussion with Brijmohan, Anu's father.
3	"The Couple"	Pavan Sadineni	Biswapati Sarkar	13 November 2020
Ritu and Anu's landlord doesn't approve of boys visiting and staying in their flat, so Laxman takes Phani to a new place to live, a house which is already being shared by eight men.
4	"The Surprise"	Pavan Sadineni	Biswapati Sarkar	13 November 2020
While house-hunting Phani and Anu come across Pathik who turns out to be Phani's childhood friend. Pathik is marrying his girlfriend Rashmi but both of them are developing cold feet as the marriage approaches. Phani and Anu try to resolve the conflict between Pathik and Rashmi but end up creating a conflict in their mind about the future of their own relationship.
5	"The Agreement"	Pavan Sadineni	Biswapati Sarkar	13 November 2020
Anu comes to the conclusion that since Phani and herself are never on the same page, it's better to move away from each other than leading a life filled with arguments and suffering.

== Production ==
In 2019, The Viral Fever (TVF) announced that it is going to remake Permanent Roommates in Telugu. They then announced that they are going to produce the remake along with Aha by naming the web series as CommitMental.

Popular YouTuber Udhbav Raghunanda and film actress Punarnavi Bhupalam were taken as lead actors and the series is directed by Pavan Sadineni, who previously directed Tollywood films Prema Ishq Kaadhal and Savitri.

== Reception ==
Hemanth Kumar writing for the Firstpost rated the series 2.5/5 and wrote, "Despite moments of genuine humour in CommitMental, we never get enough reasons to feel invested in the leads' romance or their challenges." On performances, Kumar added that "Punarnavi Bhupalam does a good job in her role as Anu, who’s confused about whether she wants Phani in her life or not. And Udbhav fits the role perfectly and his non-stop chatter really gets on to your nerves, which probably was his character brief too."

Neeshita Nyayapati of The Times of India rated the series two stars out of five and wrote "CommitMental has potential to be a relatable, cute series on paper. Sadly it doesn’t rise above the banal and fails to give the viewer enough insight into Anu and Phani’s relationship to feel invested."
