= Karthik Gattamneni =

Indian cinematographer and director born 1987)

- Born: 28 October 1987 (age 38); Anantapur, Andhra Pradesh, India
- Education: Institute of Aeronautical Engineering, Hyderabad, Telangana
- Occupations: Cinematographer, Director, and editor
- Years active: 2013 - present

Karthik Gattamneni is an Indian cinematographer and director known for his works in Telugu cinema. He made his debut as a cinematographer with Prema Ishq Kaadhal in 2013, and has worked on several films since his debut. He is also one of the key founders of Pondfreaks Entertainment, a short film production house.

== Early career ==
After graduating in Computer Science from the Institute of Aeronautical Engineering, Karthik aimed to become a director and tried to enter the Film and Television Institute of India in Pune, but could not make it. He then decided to try cinematography as an alternative and enrolled himself in Rajeev Menon's Mindscreen Institute for a year-long course. Later, he directed a short film titled Infinity, which featured Harshvardhan Rane in the lead role. It drew critical acclaim with celebrities like Farhan Akhtar appreciating Karthik's work. This appreciation resulted in him meeting Pavan Sadineni and both of them collaborated on Prema Ishq Kaadhal, which marked both of their feature film debuts.

== Filmography ==
Key
†	Denotes films that have not yet been released

Year	Film	Notes
2013	Prema Ishq Kaadhal	Debut as cinematographer
2014	Karthikeya	Cinematographer
2015	Surya vs Surya	Debut as director
2016	Express Raja	Cinematographer
2016	Premam	Cinematographer
2017	Ninnu Kori	Cinematographer
2017	Radha	Cinematographer
2018	Krishnarjuna Yudham	Cinematographer
2018	Awe	Cinematographer
2019	Chitralahari	Cinematographer
2020	Disco Raja	Cinematographer
2022	Bloody Mary	Cinematographer
2022	Dhamaka	Cinematographer
2022	Karthikeya 2	Cinematographer and editor; Nominated–SIIMA Award for Best Cinematographer – Telugu
2023	Kalyanam Kamaneeyam	Cinematographer
2024	Eagle	Director, writer, co-cinematographer, editor
2025	Chaurya Paatham	Writer
2025	Mirai	Director, writer, cinematographer; SIIMA Award for Best Cinematographer – Telugu
