= Dharmasthala Niyojakavargam =

2026 Indian Telugu-language film

- Theatrical release poster
- Directed by: Jai Jnana Prabha Thota
- Written by: Jai Jnana Prabha Thota; Aslam (dialogues)
- Produced by: Merum Bhaskar
- Starring: Sai Kumar; Suman; Nataraj Peri; Vithika Sheru; Rajeev Kanakala; Kasthuri
- Cinematography: Venkatahanuma Nariseti
- Edited by: Sai Babu Talari
- Music by: Mahavir Yallandar Rao
- Production company: Moving Dreams India Private Limited
- Distributed by: PVR Cinemas
- Release date: 4 September 2026
- Running time: 126 minutes
- Country: India
- Language: Telugu

Dharmasthala Niyojakavargam (lit. Dharmasthala Constituency) is a 2026 Indian Telugu-language political action drama film written and directed by Jai Jnana Prabha Thota in his directorial debut. Produced by Merum Bhaskar under Moving Dreams India Private Limited, the film stars Sai Kumar and Suman, with Nataraj Peri, Vithika Sheru, Rajeev Kanakala and Kasthuri in supporting roles.

The film was released theatrically on 4 September 2026.

== Plot ==
Bhairaj is a seven-time MLA of the Dharmasthala constituency who has done little for its development. A private college in the constituency, run by a couple, secretly supplies drugs to its students and turns many of them into addicts. Arundhati, a lecturer at the college, and a group of students including Bhadri begin to resist the racket. Bhadri, the son of tea-stall owner Eeswaraiah, is murdered.

Grief-stricken, Eeswaraiah enters politics and contests the election against Bhairaj. The film follows his campaign, the circumstances of Bhadri's death, and Arundhati's fight on behalf of the students, while addressing problems in the education system, drug abuse among young people, the importance of voting, and the role of money in politics. Eeswaraiah defeats Bhairaj and wins the seat.

== Cast ==
- Suman as Eeswaraiah
- Sai Kumar as Bhairaj
- Nataraj Peri as Bhadri
- Vithika Sheru as Arundhati
- Rajeev Kanakala as Vasudev
- Kasthuri Shankar as Kasthuri
- Varun Sandesh as Varun (cameo appearance)
- Rayancha Kokkura as Eesha
- Chandra Sekhar as Shekar
- Shafi as Kundan
- Raja Ravindra as Stalin
- Prabhakar as Prabhakar
- Shivakumar Ramachandravarapu as Vishwa
- Harika as Bhairaj's wife
- Anjali as the party president
- Prudhvi as Shivaramayya
- Satya Prakash as the circle inspector

== Production ==
=== Development ===
Dharmasthala Niyojakavargam is the first feature film directed by Jai Jnana Prabha Thota (also credited as Jai Gnana Prabha Thota), who also wrote its story and screenplay; dialogues were written by Aslam. According to the director, the script is fictional but was inspired by a real-life incident. The film was produced by Merum Bhaskar under the banner Moving Dreams India Private Limited.

=== Casting ===
Senior actors Sai Kumar and Suman were cast in the central roles of the incumbent MLA and the tea-stall owner who challenges him. The film marked the screen debut of Nataraj, who plays the student Bhadri. Kasthuri plays a negative role, which The Hans India described as her first.

=== Filming ===
Venkatahanuma Nariseti handled the cinematography, Sai Babu Talari edited the film, Bhargava Noundla served as art director, Nandu choreographed the action sequences and Srashti Varma choreographed the songs. The makers stated that filming was completed within the planned schedule. The first look was released on 1 January 2026, by which time filming had been completed and the film was in post-production.

== Music ==
The soundtrack and background score were composed by Mahavir Yallandar Rao. All five songs were written by Chandrabose, who reportedly wrote them without remuneration; vocalists include Sunitha and Sai Charan. The first single, "Dharmo Rakshati Rakshitah", was launched by director Krish Jagarlamudi and Chandrabose at an event at Prasad Labs, Hyderabad, in August 2026.

== Release ==
The makers initially planned a February 2026 release. A press meet was held in Hyderabad on 21 August 2026, and a pre-release event followed with director V. V. Vinayak as chief guest. The film was released theatrically worldwide on 4 September 2026, with PVR Cinemas handling distribution in the Telugu states.

== Reception ==
=== Critical response ===
Suhas Sistu of The Hans India rated the film 3/5, praising its socially conscious subject, its treatment of political and student issues without vulgarity or needless controversy, the lead performances, and the music and lyrics, while noting that it is not a conventional commercial entertainer. A reviewer for Deccan Chronicle described it as a socially minded commercial film with solid performances and a relevant theme, though with uneven editing in places.

Saketh U of 10TV rated it 2.75, praising Suman's performance across the character's two phases, Sai Kumar's negative role, Nataraj's debut and Vithika Sheru's performance, and calling the director's handling of the message-driven story competent; he found the second half engaging but the first half routine. A critic for Sakshi Post singled out Suman and Sai Kumar as the strongest performers and found the second half more engaging, but cited a predictable plot and slow first half as drawbacks. TeluguBulletin.com rated it 2.5/5, calling it a routine political drama with a relevant message; it praised Sai Kumar's performance and the climax but criticised the predictable screenplay and a runtime that could have been tighter.
