= Sa Re Ga Ma Pa The Next Singing Youth Icon =

- Season 16
- Showrunner: Putta Satish Babu
- Starring: Judges: Koti; Kasarla Shyam; S. P. Sailaja
- Presented by: Sreemukhi
- No. of contestants: 15
- Winner: Abhigna
- Runner-up: Meghana Naidu
- No. of episodes: 19

Release
- Original network: Zee Telugu
- Original release: 29 September 2024 – 9 February 2025

Season chronology
- ← Previous; Sa Re Ga Ma Pa Championship

Sa Re Ga Ma Pa The Next Singing Youth Icon is the 16th season of the Indian Telugu-language musical/singing reality television show Sa Re Ga Ma Pa Telugu. It premiered on Zee Telugu from 29 September 2024. Abhigna is the winner of the season.

== Production ==
Sreemukhi returned as the presenter after the 14th season. Koti and S. P. Sailaja returned as the judges from the previous season with Kasarla Shyam debuting in the show. D. Satya Sivakumar, Arun Kaundinya and Srikanth Ippili returned as the voice trainers of the show.

=== Auditions ===
Before conducting on-ground auditions, a digital version of the auditions were held in July 2024 soon after the announcement of the show. On-ground auditions of the show were held across ten cities in Andhra Pradesh and Telangana. Vizianagaram and Visakhapatnam auditions were held on 27 July 2024 and 28 July 2024 respectively. Rajahmundry and Vijayawada auditions were held on 3 August 2024 and 4 August 2024 respectively. Warangal and Karimnagar auditions were held on 10 August 2024 and 11 August 2024 respectively. Nellore, Tirupati and Kurnool auditions were held on 17 August 2024, 18 August 2024 and 19 August 2024 respectively. Hyderabad auditions were held on 25 August 2024.

== Judges ==
- Koti
- Kasarla Shyam
- S. P. Sailaja

== Mentors ==
Team	Mentor
City Classics	Ramya Behara
Metro Melodies	Anudeep Dev
Village Vocals	L. V. Revanth

== Guests ==
Guest	Episode(s) No.	Notes
Vijay Yesudas	1	Guest judge
Chinmayi Sripada	1	Support mentor for City Classics
Kayden Sharma	1	Support mentor for Metro Melodies
Penchal Das	1	Support mentor for Village Vocals
Srinivas	2	Guest judge
Sadha	5 and 6	Guest judge
Sadha	6	Guest judge
Kiran Abbavaram	6	To promote their film KA
Nayan Sarika	6	To promote their film KA
Tanvi Ram	6	To promote their film KA
Sri Krishna	8	To participate in the "Singing with Superstars" round
Sahithi Chaganti	8	To participate in the "Singing with Superstars" round
P V N S Rohit	8	To participate in the "Singing with Superstars" round
Harini Ivaturi	8	To participate in the "Singing with Superstars" round
Shiju Abdul Rasheed	8	To promote their television show Vikkatakavi
Naresh Agastya	8	To promote their television show Vikkatakavi
Ravi Teja Nannimala	8	To promote their television show Vikkatakavi
Tarak Ponnappa	8	To promote their television show Vikkatakavi
Pradeep Maddali	8	To promote their television show Vikkatakavi
Prudhvi Chandra	9	To participate in the "Singing with Superstars" round
Damini Bhatla	9	To participate in the "Singing with Superstars" round
Deepu	9	To participate in the "Singing with Superstars" round
Roll Rida	9	To participate in the "Singing with Superstars" round
Anantha Sriram	10 and 14–19	Guest judge
Priyadarshi Pulikonda	11	To promote their film Sarangapani Jathakam
Mohana Krishna Indraganti	11	To promote their film Sarangapani Jathakam
Roopa Koduvayur	11	To promote their film Sarangapani Jathakam
Ananya Bhaskar	12	To participate in "Maha Sangamam" round
Bharat Raj	12	To participate in "Maha Sangamam" round
Pavan Kalyan	12	To participate in "Maha Sangamam" round
Yuti Harshavardhana	12	To participate in "Maha Sangamam" round
Venkata Chaitanya	12	To participate in "Maha Sangamam" round
Sai Sri Charan	13	To participate in "Maha Sangamam" round
Daniel	13	To participate in "Maha Sangamam" round
Shivani	13	To participate in "Maha Sangamam" round
Dasari Parvathi	13	To participate in "Maha Sangamam" round
Sudhanshu	13	To participate in "Maha Sangamam" round
Nani	13	To promote the television premiere of their film Saripodhaa Sanivaaram
Priyanka Mohan	13	To promote the television premiere of their film Saripodhaa Sanivaaram
Tarun	17	
Naga Chaitanya	20	To promote their film Thandel
Sai Pallavi	20	To promote their film Thandel
Allu Aravind	20	To promote their film Thandel
Radha	20	
Mangli	20	Music performance
Satyam Rajesh	20	To promote their film Thala
Amma Rajasekhar	20	To promote their film Thala
Amma Raagin Raj	20	To promote their film Thala
Ester Noronha	20	To promote their film Thala
Vishwak Sen	20	To announce the winner and to promote his film Laila

== Contestants ==
Contestants who had selected in the premiere episode were placed in Top 15. The other contestants were in the "Hold" status.

=== Top 15 ===
Name	Home town	Team	Status	Position	Date
Abhigna	Virginia, US (Note: Born and native of Adilabad, TG)	City Classics	Winner	1st	9 February 2025
Meghana Naidu	Hyderabad, TG	Metro Melodies	1st runner-up	2nd	9 February 2025
Sathwik Rao		Metro Melodies	2nd runner-up	3rd	9 February 2025
Sri Vaishnavi	Atmakuru, AP	Village Vocals	2nd runner-up	3rd	9 February 2025
Manasa Sai	Hyderabad, TG	Metro Melodies	3rd runner-up	4th	9 February 2025
Mohan Kumar	Isakalapalem, AP	Village Vocals	3rd runner-up	4th	9 February 2025
Pratyusha	Kothagudem, TG	Village Vocals	Semi Finalist	5th	2 February 2025
Sahasra Behara		Metro Melodies	Semi Finalist	5th	2 February 2025
Sai Tushar	AP	City Classics	Semi Finalist	5th	2 February 2025
Soundarya Lahari	Visakhapatnam, AP	City Classics	Eliminated	6th	12 January 2025
Mani Yashwanth		City Classics	Eliminated	7th	1 December 2024
Mukesh	Dharmavaram, AP	Village Vocals	Eliminated	7th	1 December 2024
Manikanta	Hyderabad, TG	Metro Melodies	Eliminated	8th	20 October 2024
Sai Manoj	Reddipeta, AP	Village Vocals	Eliminated	8th	20 October 2024
Vishnupriya		City Classics	Eliminated	8th	20 October 2024

=== Other contestants ===
Name	Status
Vishwateja	Hold
Sravani	Hold
Sanjana Naidu	Hold
Shragvi	Hold
Sowmya Shubham Patra	Hold
Rajeshwar Prasad	Hold
Rammohan Rao	Hold
Srinivasa Vishnuteja	Hold
Kishore	Hold
Lakshmi Sri	Hold
Srirag	Hold
