= Konchem Touch Lo Unte Chepta =

- Genre: Talk show
- Presented by: Pradeep Machiraju
- Starring: Pradeep Machiraju
- Country of origin: India
- Original language: Telugu
- No. of seasons: 5
- No. of episodes: 113

Production
- Producer: Pradeep Machiraju
- Production locations: Hyderabad, Telangana, India
- Camera setup: Multi-camera
- Running time: 40 - 45 minutes
- Production company: Machiraju Entertainments

Original release
- Network: Zee Telugu
- Release: 27 September 2014 – present

Konchem Touchlo Unte Chepta (KTUC) is an Indian Telugu-language Television Talk show hosted by Pradeep Machiraju. The first episode of the first season of the show was aired on 27 September 2014.

== Regular segments ==
=== Heads Up ===
In this game, celebrities act out a word shown to them on a tab. Pradeep has to then guess the word and vice versa.

=== Super Six ===
In this round, celebrities give quick answers about other co-stars they have acted with.

== Season 1 ==
Season 1 began airing on 27 September 2014.

Episode Number	Guests
1	Kajal Agarwal
2	Naga Chaitanya
3	Samantha Akkineni
4	Samantha Akkineni - Part 2
5	Swathi and Allari Naresh
6	Tamannaah
7	Tamannaah - Part 2
8	Rana
9	Anjali
10	Nani
11	Avika Gor
12	Shriya
13	Charmee
14	Lakshmi Manchu
15	Navdeep
16	Nikhil Siddarth
17	Regina
18	Rajasekhar
19	Sharvanand
20	Suma
21	Rakul Preet Singh
22	Sundeep Kishan
23	Tarun
24	Rashi Khanna
25	Sai Dharam Tej
26	Naga Shourya
27	Sumanth Ashwin
28	Adah Sharma
29	Pranitha Subhash
30	Kriti Sanon

== Season 2 ==
Season 2 began airing on 8 November 2015.

Episode Number	Guests
1	Akhil
2	Nanditha
3	Sunitha
4	Anushka
5	Anushka - Part 2
6	Raj Tarun
7	Rahul Ravindran and Chinmayi
8	Ali
9	Ram
10	Shruti Haasan
11	Shruti Haasan - Part 2
12	Sudheer Babu
13	Manchu Manoj and Regina
14	Aadi and Adah Sharma
15	Sunil
16	Srikanth
17	Aadi Pinisetty and Nikki Galrani
18	Hebah Patel
19	Anasuya and Rashmi
20	Shraddha Das and Satyam Rajesh

== Season Super Sundays ==
Season Super Sundays began airing on 10 July 2016.

Episode Number	Guests
1	Rakul Preet
2	Sai Dharam Tej
3	Mahesh Babu
4	Raashi Khanna
5	Nara Rohit
6	Nani
7	Pragya Jaiswal
8	Rajasekhar, Jeevitha, Sivani and Sivathmika
9	Ravi Krishna and Chandana
10	Geetha Madhuri and Nandu
11	Allari Naresh and Sakshi Chaudhary
12	Lavanya Tripathi
13	Devi Sri Prasad
14	Ileana D'Cruz
15	Akshay Kumar and Ileana D'Cruz
16	Allu Sirish and Surbhi

== Season 3 ==
Season 3 started airing from 1 April 2017.

Episode Number	Guests
1	Rana Daggubati
2	Jagapati Babu
3	Nikhil Siddharth and Ritu Varma
4	Raashi Khanna and Lavanya Tripathi
5	Naga Chaitanya and Rakul Preet Singh
6	Raj Tharun and Hebah Patel
7	Anupama Parameswaran
8	Ritika Singh
9	Nani and Aadhi Pinisetty
10	Varun Tej
11	Mahesh babu
12	Gopichand
13	Rakul Preet Singh and Bellamkonda Sreenivas and Boyapati Srinu
14	Nivetha Thomas
15	Vedala Hemachandra and Sravana Bhargavi
16	Nithya Menen
17	Vijay Devarakonda
18	Ravi and Sreemukhi and Rashmi Gautam
19	Mehreen Pirzada
20	Shalini Pandey
21	Nagarjuna
22	Ravi Teja
23	Ram, Anupama Parameswaran and Lavanya Tripathi
24	Navdeep and Tejaswi Madivada
25	Rajasekhar, Jeevitha and family
26	Karthi and Rakul Preet Singh
27	L. V. Revanth, Lipsika and Ramya Behara
28	Sai Dharam Tej
29	Suhasini, Haritha and Anjana
30	Akhil Akkineni
31	Allu Sirish and Surbhi

== Season 4 ==
The first episode aired live from set with host thanking people and revealing what's in store for audience on 13 July 2019.

Episode Number	Guests
1	No Guests
2	Ram Pothineni, Nabha Natesh and Nidhhi Agerwal
3	Rashmika Mandanna
4	Amala Paul
5	Bellamkonda Sreenivas and Anupama Parameswaran
6	Rahul Ravindran and Rakul Preet Singh
7	Adivi Sesh and Regina Cassandra
8	Kartikeya Gummakonda and Payal Rajput
9	Anand Devarakonda and Sivathmika
10	Vishwak Sen
11	Nani
12	Varun Tej
13	Suriya and Sayyeshaa
14	Ohmkar, Aswin and Avika Gor
15	Hansika Motwani and Sundeep Kishan
16	Tharun Bhascker and Priyadarshi Pulikonda
