= Permanent Roommates =

Indian web series

- Genre: Comedy; Romance
- Created by: Arunabh Kumar
- Developed by: Biswapati Sarkar; Sameer Saxena
- Written by: Biswapati Sarkar
- Directed by: Sameer Saxena; Deepak Kumar Mishra
- Starring: Sumeet Vyas; Nidhi Singh; Deepak Kumar Mishra
- Composer: Vaibhav Bundhoo
- Country of origin: India
- Original language: Hindi
- No. of seasons: 3
- No. of episodes: 17

Production
- Executive producer: Arun Kumar
- Cinematography: Vaibhav Bundhoo
- Editors: Ashutosh Matela; Prashant Panda
- Running time: 30-60 minutes
- Production company: The Viral Fever

Original release
- Network: TVF Play; YouTube; Amazon Prime Video
- Release: 31 October 2014 – present

Permanent Roommates is an Indian romantic comedy web series produced by The Viral Fever Media Labs. It was created by Arunabh Kumar, the founder of TVF, who also worked as the executive producer of the series. Written and developed by Biswapati Sarkar along with Sameer Saxena, the series is directed by Saxena and Deepak Kumar Mishra. Starring Sumeet Vyas and Nidhi Singh, this series revolves around a young couple, Tanya and Mikesh, who after being in a long distance relationship for three years, face the prospect of marriage.

Permanent Roommates marked India's first web series to be released. The first season consisting of five episodes, had its premiere on YouTube on 31 October 2014 and ended on 12 December 2014. The makers renewed the series for a second season, which eventually was broadcast on The Viral Fever's premium online video streaming medium, TVF Play, from 14 February 2016 to 24 June 2016. A third season was released on 18 October 2023, on Amazon Prime Video.

The Viral Fever (TVF) and Aha jointly produced the remake version of Permanent Roommates in Telugu as CommitMental.

== Plot ==
Permanent Roommates follows the story of commitment-wary Tanya, and Mikesh, her overeager long-distance boyfriend who returns to India from the US to surprise Tanya and to ask her to marry him. Acting upon the advice of her roommate and her own reluctance to marry someone who barely knows her, Tanya refuses, but gives in to Mikesh's persistence. The two eventually strike a compromise, opting to move in together first. The subsequent events- a fallout, followed by a conciliation, and Tanya's premarital pregnancy end in the two of them planning their wedding, with unforeseen consequences.

== Cast and characters ==
=== Main cast ===
- Sumeet Vyas as Mikesh Chaudhary aka Miku / Mickey
- Nidhi Singh as Tanya Nagpal aka Tanu
- Rohit Sukhwani as Rohit
- Deepak Kumar Mishra as Purushottam
- Shishir Sharma as Brijmohan Nagpal, Tanya's father
- Asrani as Subhash Chaudhary, paternal grandfather of Mikesh
- Sheeba Chaddha as Lata Chaudhary, Mikesh's mother
- Darshan Jariwala as Mohanlal Chaudhary, Mikesh's father
- Ayesha Raza Mishra as Ila, Tanya's maternal aunt
- Manu Rishi as twin Dr. Mudhit, brother of Mikesh's mother
- Anandeshwar Dwivedi as Laxman aka LLeo

=== Guests ===
==== Introduced in Season 1 ====
- Jitendra Kumar as Pathik, childhood friend of Mikesh.
- Akanksha Thakur as Rashmi, fiancé of Pathik.
- Sameer Saxena as Bansal, landlord of Ritu and Tanya's house.
- Nidhi Bisht as Ritu
- Sudhir Chobeesy as Atul Choubey, the registrar

==== Introduced in Season 2 ====
- Divyendu Sharma as Agnivesh Chhabra
- Ratnabali Bhattacharjee as Seema Khatri
- Maanvi Gagroo as Shivani Chhabra
- Pradhuman Singh as Hemant
- Rasika Dugal as Avantika
- Anant Singh as Bulla

==== Introduced in Season 3 ====
- Sachin Pilgaonkar as Venkat Uncle

== Episodes ==
=== Season 1 (2014) ===
No. overall	Episode	Title	Directed by	Written by	Date of Broadcast
1	1	"The Proposal"	Sameer Saxena	Biswapati Sarkar	31 October 2014
Mikesh returns to India from United States of America and puts across a marriage proposal towards Tanya, with whom he's had a long distance relationship for the last three years, but Tanya is still in two minds about accepting or rejecting his proposal.
2	2	"The Father-in-Law"	Sameer Saxena	Biswapati Sarkar	5 November 2014
Mikesh wants to marry Tanya, but Tanya believes he is rushing things. So both of them try to reach a conclusion by having a discussion with Brijmohan, Tanya's father.
3	3	"The Bachelor Pad"	Sameer Saxena	Biswapati Sarkar	19 November 2014
Ritu and Tanya's landlord doesn't approve of boys visiting and staying in their flat, so Laxman takes Mikesh to a new place to live, a house which is already being shared by eight men.
4	4	"The Bridegroom"	Sameer Saxena	Biswapati Sarkar	26 November 2014
While house-hunting Mikesh and Tanya come across Pathik who turns out to be Mikesh's childhood friend. Pathik is marrying his girlfriend Rashmi but both of them are developing cold feet as the marriage approaches. Mikesh and Tanya try to resolve the conflict between Pathik and Rashmi but end up creating a conflict in their mind about the future of their own relationship.
5	5	"The Agreement"	Sameer Saxena	Biswapati Sarkar	12 December 2014
Tanya comes to the conclusion that since Mikesh and herself are never on the same page, it's better to move away from each other than leading a life filled with arguments and suffering.

=== Season 2 (2016) ===
No. overall	Episode	Title	Directed by	Written by	Date of Broadcast
6	1	"The Parents"	Deepak Kumar Mishra & Biswapati Sarkar	Biswapati Sarkar	14 February 2016
Tanya is apprehensive about meeting the parents of Mikesh, but before that happens Tanya receives a surprising news that ends up adding to her anxiousness.
7	2	"The Man"	Deepak Kumar Mishra & Biswapati Sarkar	Biswapati Sarkar	28 February 2016
Mikesh's parents want Tanya and Mikesh to marry as early as possible but Mikesh refuses to do so. What follows is a night of confusion and confessions where more secrets are revealed.
8	3	"The Event"	Deepak Kumar Mishra & Biswapati Sarkar	Biswapati Sarkar & Nidhi Bisht	13 March 2016
After returning from a business trip Tanya learns that Mikesh is planning an extremely expensive wedding for the two of them. Tanya refuses to wed in such a lavish manner but finds herself dumbstruck when she comes across Seema Khatri, the event manager of the wedding ceremony. While Tanya and Mikesh attempt to stop the marriage that has turned into a huge event, their parents end up creating a new problem for them to deal with.
9	4	"The Dinner"	Sameer Saxena	Biswapati Sarkar	8 April 2016
Dr. Mudhit invites Tanya and Mikesh along with two other couples to his house for dinner and puts across a puzzle for them to solve.
10	5	"The Memories"	Sameer Saxena	Biswapati Sarkar	22 May 2016
While returning home from the hospital Tanya and Mikesh end up losing their bag which contained the first ultrasound image of their unborn child. Tanya, Mikesh and their driver Purshottam narrate the entire incident from their own point of view to Dr. Mudhit, so as to solve the mystery of the missing bag.
11	6	"The Gift"	Sameer Saxena	Biswapati Sarkar	7 June 2016
When the entire family is busy preparing for the wedding, Mikesh and Tanya get a first hand experience of parenting as Purshottam leaves his younger brothers, who are twins, at their house for a few hours.
12	7	"The Attempt"	Sameer Saxena	Biswapati Sarkar	24 June 2016
In order to come out of the sad phase that has engulfed their life, Mikesh and Tanya decide to revisit their happy memories and search for answers about their future.

=== Season 3 (2023) ===
No. overall	Episode	Title	Directed by	Written by	Date of Broadcast
13	1	"Never Say No"	Shreyansh Pandey	Arunabh Kumar, Biswapati Sarkar, Shreya Srivastava & Vaibhav Suman	18 October 2023
When all of Mikesh's antics on their anniversary fail to cheer her up, Tanya decides on a life-changing career move. Mikesh, in his usual style, learns how to be "The Man".
14	2	"Paperwork"	Shreyansh Pandey	Arunabh Kumar, Biswapati Sarkar, Shreya Srivastava & Vaibhav Suman	18 October 2023
Having given Tanya the go-ahead for her idea of them moving abroad, Mikesh will now do anything to get her mind off it.
15	3	"All Is Bad That Ends Bad"	Shreyansh Pandey	Arunabh Kumar, Biswapati Sarkar, Shreya Srivastava & Vaibhav Suman	18 October 2023
When Tanya realises Mikesh is going to be of no help in their plans to move abroad, she takes matters into her own hands, leaving Mikesh very little to do.
16	4	"Catharsis"	Shreyansh Pandey	Arunabh Kumar, Biswapati Sarkar, Shreya Srivastava & Vaibhav Suman	18 October 2023
From the multiple reasons cited by Mikesh not to move abroad, Lata wants to know the real reason.
17	5	"Goodbyes"	Shreyansh Pandey	Arunabh Kumar, Biswapati Sarkar, Shreya Srivastava & Vaibhav Suman	18 October 2023
Lata leaves telling Mikesh and Tanya to confront what ails them. Mikesh rights all his wrongs till there is one last wrong to be righted.

== Soundtrack ==
The series' original soundtrack album is composed, written and performed by Vaibhav Bundhoo, which marked their first collaboration with The Viral Fever. Followed by the success of the Permanent Roommates, Bundhoo who worked as the composer and cinematographer of the series was also hired for other projects of TVF, as well as the second season of the series.

=== Season 1 ===
Permanent Roommates (Season 1)

Soundtrack album by Vaibhav Bundhoo
- Released: 17 December 2014
- Recorded: 2014
- Genre: Soundtrack
- Length: 19:57
- Label: The Viral Fever
- Producer: Vaibhav Bundhoo

All lyrics are written by Vaibhav Bundhoo.

No.	Title	Length
1.	"Hi Tanu"	3:51
2.	"Permanent Roommates Theme" (Background Score)	0:55
3.	"Brijmohan's Advice" (Background Score)	1:51
4.	"Lleo's Theme" (Background Score)	2:12
5.	"Jaane Do"	3:55
6.	"Chahe Kya Mann Mera"	3:50
7.	"Chamdi"	3:24

=== Season 2 ===
Permanent Roommates (Season 2)

Soundtrack album by Vaibhav Bundhoo
- Released: 1 July 2016
- Recorded: 2016
- Genre: Soundtrack
- Length: 28:15
- Label: The Viral Fever
- Producer: Vaibhav Bundhoo

All lyrics are written by Vaibhav Bundhoo.

No.	Title	Length
1.	"Pick Me Up" (Theme)	1:05
2.	"Tere Pyar Mein Paagal"	2:32
3.	"Yeh Kya Hua Humein"	3:28
4.	"Phir Bhi"	4:12
5.	"Khatri End Monologue"	4:28
6.	"Ishq Bin Kathin"	4:13
7.	"Lleo 2.0"	2:01
8.	"Tere Bina"	2:56
9.	"Pick Me Up" (PR Theme)	3:20

=== Season 3 ===
No.	Title	Lyrics	Singer(s)	Length
1.	"Bataa"	-	Osho Jain, Avinash Chouhan	3:37
2.	"Kahani Shuru"	-	Neeti Mohan, Rohan Rohan, Avinash Chouhan	3:26
3.	"Tere Pyaar Mein Ye Kho Gaya"	-	Vivek Hariharan, Rohan Rohan, Avinash Chouhan	2:31
4.	"Zaroori Hai"	-	Osho Jain, Vidhya Gopal	3:17
5.	"Saiyaanji Humri Baat Na Maane"	-	Rohan Rohan, Bhumi Pradhan	2:11
Total length:				15:02

== Release and reception ==
Permanent Roommates has been well received by the audience. The first episode, which premiered on 31 October 2014, has more than 4.5 million views. The series hosted on TVF's official YouTube channel, has since gathered over 1 million views for each episode. After the reception of the series, the makers unveiled the second season of the series through TVF's newly launched online platform TVF Play on 14 February 2016, which ended on 24 June 2016. On 6 October 2017, the series' dubbed Tamil version was released through TVF Machi, the media's first regional platform, with the first season being released.

== Spin-offs ==
=== Permanent Roommates: He Said, She Said ===
In March 2020, a 20-episode audio-book series titled Permanent Roommates: He Said, She Said was made available on Audible Suno (Indian version of the Amazon-owned Audible), with the original lead cast Sumeet Vyas and Nidhi Singh returning to voice their characters. The episodes bridge the story between the two seasons focusing on the lives of Mikesh and Tanya when they moved in together.

A second season was released on Audible (moved from Audible Suno) in October 2021, followed by a third season in February 2022.

=== Tankesh Diaries ===
In March 2023, a 3-episode mini-series titled Tankesh Diaries was released on TVF's YouTube channel, with Sumeet Vyas and Nidhi Singh reprising their roles as Mikesh and Tanya from the original series.

== Remake ==
In 2019, The Viral Fever (TVF) announced their foray into Telugu market, with the remake of this series in the language. It further announced that they will produce the remake along with Aha by naming the web series as CommitMental. Popular YouTuber Udhbav Raghunanda and film actress Punarnavi Bhupalam were taken as lead actors and the series is directed by Sadineni Pavan. It was released on 13 November 2020.

== See also ==
- List of productions by The Viral Fever
