= Bigg Boss (Telugu TV series) season 3 =

Reality TV game show – Telugu language

Bigg Boss
- Season 3
- Season 3 eye logo
- Presented by: Nagarjuna (Week 1–5, 7–15); Ramya Krishnan (Week 6)
- No. of days: 105
- No. of housemates: 17
- Winner: Rahul Sipligunj
- Runner-up: Sreemukhi
- No. of episodes: 106

Release
- Original network: Star Maa
- Original release: 21 July – 3 November 2019

Season chronology
- ← Previous; Season 2 Next → Season 4

Bigg Boss 3 is the third season of the Telugu-language version of the Indian reality television series Bigg Boss. It premiered on 21 July 2019 on Star Maa. Nagarjuna was the host of the season. Ramya Krishnan was guest host for Week 6 instead of Nagarjuna who was then in Spain for celebrating his 60th birthday.

The season concluded on 3 November 2019 after 105 days with Rahul Sipligunj winning the title along with ₹5,000,000 prize money while Sreemukhi emerged as the first runner-up.

== Production ==
=== Bigg Boss 3 Buzzz ===
Bigg Boss 3 Buzzz is an Indian Telugu-language Television talk show about the reality television series Bigg Boss Telugu. The host Tanish conducts the talk show with the evicted contestants of Bigg Boss 3 on every Monday, the show premiered on 22 July 2019 onwards on Star Maa Music. The unseen portions of episodes that were not aired on television are streamed on Disney+ Hotstar and aired on Star Maa Music as Bigg Boss 3 Buzzz.

=== Reception ===
The launch of season 3 opened with 17.9 TVR, which is bigger than the previous seasons. The grand finale of season 3 of duration four and half hours scored 18.29 TVR being the highest ever rating achieved by the Bigg Boss Indian franchise. The last hour of telecast, featuring Chiranjeevi as chief guest, alone garnered 22.4 TVR.

=== Bigg Boss 3 Voting Process ===
As the Bigg Boss 3 Telugu vote online process has been started, viewers can vote for their favorite contestant through Disney+ Hotstar or by giving a missed call.

== Housemates status ==
Sr	Housemate	Day entered	Day exited	Status
1	Rahul	Day 1	Day 105	Winner
2	Sreemukhi	Day 1	Day 105	1st Runner-up
3	Baba	Day 1	Day 105	2nd Runner-up
4	Varun	Day 1	Day 105	3rd Runner-up
5	Ali	Day 1	Day 49	Evicted
5	Ali	Day 68	Day 105	4th Runner-up
6	Jyothi	Day 1	Day 98	Evicted
7	Vithika	Day 1	Day 91	Evicted
8	Mahesh	Day 1	Day 84	Evicted
9	Punarnavi	Day 1	Day 77	Evicted
10	Ravi	Day 1	Day 70	Evicted
11	Himaja	Day 1	Day 63	Evicted
12	Shilpa	Day 43	Day 56	Evicted
13	Ashu	Day 1	Day 35	Evicted
14	Rohini	Day 1	Day 28	Evicted
15	Tamanna	Day 7	Day 21	Evicted
16	Jaffar	Day 1	Day 14	Evicted
17	Hema	Day 1	Day 7	Evicted

== Housemates ==
The participants in the order of appearance and entered in house are:

=== Original entrants ===
- Shiva Jyothi – Presenter.
- Ravi Krishna – Television actor.
- Ashu Reddy – Internet celebrity.
- Jaffar – Journalist.
- Himaja – Actress.
- Rahul Sipligunj – singer.
- Rohini Noni – Television Actress.
- Baba Bhaskar – Choreographer & director.
- Punarnavi Bhupalam – Actress.
- Hema Vani – Actress.
- Ali Reza – Actor & model.
- Mahesh Vitta – Actor.
- Sreemukhi – Actress & Television presenter.
- Varun Sandesh – Film actor
- Vithika Sheru –Actress.

=== Wild Card entrants ===
- Tamanna Simhadri – Actress and activist
- Shilpa Chakravarthy – Television presenter.
