= Crazy Uncles =

South Indian comedy movie

- Directed by: E Sathi Babu
- Written by: Darling Swamy
- Produced by: Boddu Ashok
- Starring: Sreemukhi; Raja Ravindra; Mano; Bharani Shankar; Posani Krishna Murali
- Cinematography: Bal Reddy
- Edited by: B. Nageshwara reddy
- Music by: Raghu Kunche
- Production companies: Good Cinema Group, Green metro Movies & Srivas 2 Creatives
- Release date: 19 August 2021
- Running time: 102 mins
- Country: India
- Language: Telugu

Crazy Uncles is a 2021 Indian Telugu-language comedy film written and directed by E Sathi Babu. It is produced by Boddu Ashok under the banners of Good Cinema Group, Green metro Movies & Srivas 2 Creatives. The film stars Sreemukhi, Raja Ravindra, Mano, Bharani Shankar, Posani Krishna Murali in supporting roles.

The music was composed by Raghu Kunche. It was released on 19 August 2021.

== Plot ==
Three friends—Reddy, Raju, and Rao—are unhappy in their marriages and look for excitement outside their relationships. They decide to try to win over a famous singer named Sweety. Each of them tries to impress her and hopes to spend a night with her, without knowing that the others are also trying to do the same. The story explores what happens when these friends attempt to woo Sweety and whether she ends up spending the night with any of them.

== Cast ==
Film cast:

- Sreemukhi as Sweety
- Raja Ravindra as Raju
- Mano as Reddy
- Bharani Shankar as Rao
- Posani Krishna Murali
- Giridhar
- Raghu Karumanchi
- Hema
- Gayatri Bharghavi
- Vijaya Murthy
- Vaajpai
- Mahendra Nath
- Madhuri
- Sindhuri
- Bandla Ganesh as Star Producer
- Praveen as Aspiring Director

== Release ==
=== Theatrical ===
Crazy Uncles was released on 19 August 2021 in Telugu language.
