= Sa Re Ga Ma Pa The Next Singing ICON =

Indian singing talent competition TV show

- Season 13
- Starring: Judges; Koti; S. P. Sailaja; Chandrabose
- Presented by: Pradeep Machiraju
- No. of contestants: 20
- Winner: Yasaswi Kondepudi
- Runner-up: Bharat Raj
- No. of episodes: 30

Release
- Original network: Zee Telugu
- Original release: 23 August 2020 – 21 March 2021

Season chronology
- Next → Sa Re Ga Ma Pa The Singing Superstar

Sa Re Ga Ma Pa The Next Singing ICON is the 13th season of Indian Telugu-language musical/singing reality television show Sa Re Ga Ma Pa Telugu. It premiered on Zee Telugu from 23 August 2020. Kondepudi Yasaswi is the winner of the season.

== Production ==
It started on 23 August 2020 with Pradeep Machiraju as the host. The show is directed by Shashi Kiran Goud and judged by Koti, S. P. Sailaja and Chandrabose. The final episode was aired on 21 March 2021.

== Judges ==
- Koti
- S. P. Sailaja
- Chandrabose
- Kalpana Raghavendar (Episodes 6 & 7; final episode special judge)
- Sunitha Upadrashta (final episode special judge)

== Jury ==
- Damini Bhatla
- Deepu
- Harika Narayan
- L. V. Revanth
- Prudhvi Chandra
- Raghuram
- Saketh
- Soni
- Sandeep

== Guests ==
| Guest | Episode(s) No. | Ref. |
|---|---|---|
| Rahul Sipligunj | 2 | |
| Sudigali Sudheer | 3 | |
| Ramya Krishnan | 4 & 5 | |
| Baba Bhaskar | 8 | |
| Jani Master | 8 | |
| Bithiri Sathi | 9 | |
| Sunitha Upadrashta | 14 & 15 | |
| Aadi | 24 & 25 | |
| Surbhi | 24 & 25 | |
| Arun Chiluveru | 24 & 25 | |
| Baba Sehgal | 30 | |
| Geetha Madhuri | 30 | |
| Sid Sriram | 30 | |
| Rana Daggubati | 30 | |
| Zoya Hussain | 30 | |

== Contestants ==
- Kondepudi Yasaswi (Winner)
- Bharat Raj (Runner-Up)
- Pavan Kalyan (Second Runner-Up)
- Venkata Chaitanya (Finalist)
- Pragna Nayani (Finalist)
- Ananya Bhaskar
- Abhilash Anand Katta
- Teja
- Lakshmi Gayathri
- Balaji
- Swapnika Kosuru
- Yuti Harshavardhana
- Sai Priya
- Ganesh
- Rana
- Sai Sameera
- Vikram
- Prathima Korada
- Rajeshwari

== Eliminations ==
| Contestant | Round |
|---|---|
| Ananya | Super Six |
| Yuti | Semi Finals-2 |
| Saipriya | Semi Finals-2 |
| Ganesh | Semi Finals-1 |
| Lakshmi Gayathri | Semi Finals-1 |
| Abhilash | Quarter Finals |
| Teja | Quarter Finals |
| Sai Sameera | Round 4 |
| Swapnika | Round 4 |
| Balaji | Round 4 |
| Vikram | Round 4 |
| Prathima Korada | Round 2 |
| Rajeshwari | Round 2 |
| Rana | Round 2 |
