= Senapathi =

2021 film by Pavan Sadineni

- Official release poster
- Directed by: Pavan Sadineni
- Written by: Hussain Sha Kiran; Vasant Jurru; Pavan Sadineni
- Based on: 8 Thottakkal by Sri Ganesh
- Produced by: Vishnu Prasad; Sushmitha Konidela
- Starring: Rajendra Prasad; Naresh Agastya; Gnaneswari Kandregula
- Cinematography: Vivek Kalepu
- Edited by: Goutham Nerusu
- Music by: Shravan Bharadwaj
- Production company: Gold Box Entertainment
- Distributed by: Aha
- Release date: 31 December 2021
- Running time: 143 minutes
- Country: India
- Language: Telugu

Senapathi (transl. General) is a 2021 Indian Telugu-language crime thriller film directed by Pavan Sadineni. It is a remake of the 2017 Tamil-language film 8 Thottakkal. The film features an ensemble cast including Rajendra Prasad, Naresh Agastya, and Gnaneswari Kandregula. Senapathi premiered on 31 December 2021 on the Telugu and Tamil streaming service Aha.

== Cast ==
- Rajendra Prasad as Krishna Murthy
- Naresh Agastya as Inspector Krishna
- Gnaneswari Kandregula as Satya
- Harsha Vardhan as Paramjyoti
- Satya Prakash as CI Purushotham
- Rakendu Mouli as Husain
- Josh Ravi as Raju
- A. Jeevan Kumar as Babloo Yadav
- Pavani Reddy as Mahalakshmi "Maha"
- Rocky as Siva

== Production and release ==
Director Pavan Sadineni, who is known for his 2013 romcom Prema Ishq Kaadhal, was signed to helm the remake of the crime thriller 8 Thottakkal. Sadineni, however, prefers it to be called a "semi-remake" because they added new characters and changed several aspects while retaining the crux of the original. The film marks the digital debut of veteran actor Rajendra Prasad. Filming began in September 2021 and took place in the neighbourhoods of Hyderabad including Kavadiguda, Sainikpuri, Moosapet, Quthbullapur and the Old City. Senapathi released digitally on 31 December 2021 on the streaming service Aha.

== Reception ==
Sangeetha Devi Dundoo of The Hindu appreciated the performances of Prasad and Agasthya and wrote: "Senapathi begins with the promise of an edge-of-the-seat crime drama but gradually becomes an emotional tale. The emotional portions feel lengthy and stretched; had it been shorter, it would have added to the slow-burn atmosphere of the crime drama." A reviewer from Eenadu appreciated the screenplay and stated that Sadineni had succeeded in adapting the Tamil film 8 Thottakkal to Telugu nativity. In another positive review, Rajitha Chanti of TV9 Telugu also echoed the same, praising the performances and direction. On technical aspects, Asianet News' Surya Prakash called Kalepu's cinematography a "highlight" while opining that Nerusu's editing could have been better. Production designed and score were also appreciated by Prakash.

== See also ==
- Remakes of films by Akira Kurosawa
