= 30 Rojullo Preminchadam Ela =

2021 film directed by Munna

- Theatrical release poster
- Directed by: Dhulipudi Phani Pradeep (Munna)
- Written by: Dhulipudi Phani Pradeep (Munna)
- Produced by: Babu S.V
- Starring: Pradeep Machiraju; Amritha Aiyer
- Cinematography: Dasaradhi Sivendra
- Edited by: Karthika Srinivas
- Music by: Anup Rubens
- Production company: SV Productions
- Distributed by: GA2UV
- Release date: 29 January 2021
- Country: India
- Language: Telugu
- Box office: est. ₹13 crore

30 Rojullo Preminchadam Ela (transl. How to fall in love within 30 days?), also known by the initialism 30RPE, is a 2021 Indian Telugu-language fantasy romance film directed by debutant Munna Dhulipudi, starring Pradeep Machiraju and Amritha Aiyer. Based on the theme of reincarnation and body swapping, the film marks Machiraju's debut in a lead role. The film was released on 29 January 2021 to mixed reviews.

== Plot ==
In 1947, Abbayi Gaaru and Ammayi Gaaru want to get married, but Abbayi gets killed in a fistfight, and Ammayigaru commits suicide. They are born again as Arjun and Akshara. Both get admission to the same Engineering college in Vizag. For some strange reason, they hate each other from the first sight itself. But the fate brings them to the same location where Abbai Garu and Ammayi Garu died. Here's the twist: they find themselves in each other's bodies. Arjun enters into Akshara's body, Akshara in Arjun's body. When they ask a swami how they can be turned back into their normal selves, he asks them to come back after 30 days. However, if this information is divulged, the effect might be permanent.

The next 30 days they make each other look like fools in front of their family and friends, which eventually leads to Akshara trying to commit suicide in Arjun's body, which Arjun prevents, they both promise to mend their behavior.

They go to meet the swami, but are shocked to learn that he died. Upon enquiring his pupil for the solution, he tells them he needs 30 more days to prepare for a ritual. Meanwhile, the ritual success might depend on them falling in love.

After spending time in each other's lives, they start to like each other, but Arjun needs to fight a kickboxing match against his rival. Akshara, having no idea of how to kickbox eventually enters the bout to fulfill Arjun's dream, as she gets badly beaten in Arjun's body, they realise their feelings for each other and kiss. The process is reversed, allowing Arjun to fight against his rival and win.

== Cast ==
- Pradeep Machiraju in a dual role as Arjun and Abbayigaru
- Amritha Aiyer in a dual role as Akshara and Ammayigaru
- Subhalekha Sudhakar as Swamiji
- Posani Krishna Murali as Posani Subba Rao, Akshara's father
- Sharanya Pradeep as Akshara's sister
- Pramod Gurram as Akshara's Brother-in-law ( Sharanya's Husband)
- Hema as Arjun's mother
- Harsha Chemudu as Nagarjuna, Arjun's friend
- Hyper Aadi as Arjun's friend
- Bhadram as Bhadram, Arjun's friend
- Sruthi as Mahalakshmi Akshara's friend
- Sivannarayana Naripeddi as Arjun's father
- Sameer Hasan as Arjun's coach
- Sudha as Doctor
- Anasuya in a special appearance in the song Wah Wah Mere Bawa
- Rashmi Gautam as in a special appearance in the song Wah Wah Mere Bawa
- Sreemukhi as in a special appearance in the song Wah Wah Mere Bawa

== Production ==
Amritha Aiyer was signed to play a role in the film after the director, Munna, saw a song from Padaiveeran. The film is produced by SV Babu who previously produced Keratam and Andamaina Manasulo. The film was shot in Rajahmundry and Kerala. The film was scheduled to release on Ugadi 2020, but was postponed due to the COVID-19 pandemic.

== Soundtrack ==
The film's sound track consists of three songs which were released through Lahari Music label. The song "Neeli Neeli Aakasam" became one of the biggest hits in the Telugu music. It topped the Telugu music charts and also hyped the film's promotions during its pre-release period.

30 Rojullo Preminchadam Ela

Soundtrack album by Anup Rubens
- Recorded: 2019–2020
- Genre: Feature film soundtrack
- Language: Telugu
- Label: Lahari Music; T-series
- Producer: Anup Rubens

Anup Rubens chronology
Orey Bujjiga (2020)	30 Rojullo Preminchadam Ela (2021)

All music is composed by Anup Rubens.

Track listing
No.	Title	Lyrics	Singer(s)	Length
1.	"Neeli Neeli Aakasam"	Chandrabose	Sid Sriram, Sunitha Upadrashta	4:43
2.	"Idera Sneham"	Chandrabose	Armaan Malik	3:54
3.	"Meeko Dhandam"	Chandrabose	Dhananjay, Mohana Bhogaraju	4:29
4.	"Amma Nannu Mallee Penchavaa"	Anantha Sriram	Rishon Rubens, Anup Rubens	4:40
5.	"Wah Wah Mere Bava" (Promotional)	Anup Rubens, Pradeep Machiraju	Rahul Sipligunj	3:46
Total length:				17:47

== Reception ==
=== Critical reception ===
Thadhagath Pathi of The Times of India stated that "30 Rojullo Preminchatam Ela has its heart in the right place but with too many gaps in its narrative, an outdated storyline and predictable plot, it doesn't have enough in it to draw people to the theatres amid the pandemic. Alas, this dish has been ruined by putting in too many ingredients that don't work well together." Viswanath Vijayanagaram from The New Indian Express wrote that "The film is jarring on so many levels. A friendship song plays between the lead pair just a few minutes after they stopped quarrelling like incorrigible muppets. Viva Harsha, who is deliberately named Nagarjuna, keeps receiving racist 'jokes'. This film doesn't work even as a college campus story. The jokes are all very unfunny. TV show host-turned-actor Pradeep makes a damp squib of a debut, with his comic timing testing your patience. Amritha Aiyer has the potential to deliver a good performance, provided the script is good, which this one isn't. All told, the song Neeli Neeli Aakasam, which comes just a few minutes into the movie, is the film's only bright spot".

Another reviewer from The Hans India wrote that "The movie starts off well and the love story in the flashback scenes is showcased well. However, the director has failed to grab the attention in the present sequences. The major twist before the interval is not that interesting and even the second half is extremely boring and the sloppy narration will irritate the audience. Despite having some plus points like performances, music, and comedy, the forced emotions, slow-paced narration, and boring screenplay became the biggest minus points of the film. On the whole, '30 Rojullo Preminchadam Ela' is just an average film and can be watched once."

=== Box office ===
The film collected a gross collection of ₹4 crore on its first day.
