= Institute of Aeronautical Engineering =

Institute in Hyderabad, Telangana, India

- IARE
- Motto in English: Education for Liberation
- Type: Private
- Established: 2000
- Academic affiliations: Jawaharlal Nehru Technological University, Hyderabad
- Chairman: M Rajashekar Reddy
- Location: Dundigal Road, Dundigal, Hyderabad, Telangana, 500043, India; 17.5999321°N 78.4155366°E
- Campus: Sub-urban
- Website: www.iare.ac.in
- Location within Telangana Location within India

Institute of Aeronautical Engineering (IARE) is a private engineering college in Hyderabad. The college offers postgraduate (master's) and undergraduate (bachelor's) courses in engineering and technology.

The college is located near Indian Air Force Academy, Dundigal in Hyderabad. It was established in 2000. Institute of Aeronautical Engineering is affiliated to Jawaharlal Nehru Technological University, Hyderabad and approved by AICTE.

== Degrees ==
- Bachelor of Engineering
- Aeronautical Engineering
- Mechanical Engineering
- Civil Engineering
- Computer Science and Engineering
- Electronics and Communication Engineering
- Electrical and Electronics Engineering
- Information Technology
- Computer Science and Engineering (Artificial Intelligence and Machine Learning)
- Computer Science and Engineering (Data Science)
- Computer Science and Engineering (Cyber Security)
- Computer Science and Information Technology
- Master of Business Administration
- M.Tech (Aerospace Engineering)
- M.Tech (CAD/CAM (Mechanical Engineering)
- M.Tech (Computer Science and Engineering)
- M.Tech (Embedded Systems)
- M.Tech (Electrical Power Systems)
- M.Tech (Structural Engineering)

== Departments ==
- Chemistry/Environmental Science Department
- English Department
- Mathematics Department
- Managerial Science Department
- Computer Science and Engineering Department
- Physics Department

== Rankings and affiliations ==
University and college rankings

Engineering – India
- NIRF (2024): 151-200

The National Institutional Ranking Framework (NIRF) ranked it between 151-200 among engineering colleges in 2024. Institute of Aeronautical Engineering is affiliated to Jawaharlal Nehru Technological University, Hyderabad and approved by AICTE. It is also recognised by the University Grants Commission (UGC).

== Sports ==
The campus has a playground which is available for basketball, kabaddi and indoor games, and also has a gym.

== See also ==
- Education in India
- Literacy in India
- List of institutions of higher education in Telangana
