= Dayaa =

2023 Indian fantasy comedy thriller miniseries

- Promotional poster
- Genre: Thriller; Drama
- Created by: Neamoth Ullah Masum; Syed Ahmed Shawki
- Written by: Pavan Sadineni; Vasant Kumar Jurru; Rakendu Mouli
- Directed by: Pavan Sadineni
- Starring: J. D. Chakravarthy; Babloo Prithiveeraj; Eesha Rebba; Remya Nambeesan; Kamal Kamaraju
- Music by: Shravan Bharadwaj
- Country of origin: India
- Original language: Telugu
- No. of seasons: 1
- No. of episodes: 8

Production
- Producers: Shrikant Mohta; Mahendra Soni; Naga Nandini Puli; Sivaramakrishnan KL; Shalini Nambu; Abhishek Daga
- Cinematography: Vivek Kalepu
- Editor: Viplav Nyshadam
- Camera setup: Multi-camera
- Running time: 28 minutes

Original release
- Network: Disney+ Hotstar
- Release: 4 August 2023

Dayaa is an Indian Telugu-language crime thriller television series written and directed by Pavan Sadineni. It stars J. D. Chakravarthy in titular role with Eesha Rebba, Remya Nambeesan, Babloo Prithiveeraj, Kamal Kamaraju and Josh Ravi in pivotal roles. The series was released on 4 August 2023, on Disney+Hotstar to widely positive reviews. The series is an Indian adaptation of Bangladeshi series Taqdeer created by Neamoth Ullah Masum and Syed Ahmed Shawki with Anuradha Raparla as content head.

== Plot ==
The series revolves around cold-storage van driver named Dayaa (played by J. D. Chakravarthy) whose whole life turns upside down when he finds a dead body inside his van. A trail of chaotic events follows which pushes Dayaa and his best friend into bigger difficulties.

== Cast ==
- J. D. Chakravarthy as Satya alias "Dayaa"
- Babloo Prithiveeraj as MLA Parasuramaraju
- Eesha Rebba as Alivelu, Dayaa's wife
- Remya Nambeesan as Journalist Kavitha Naidu
- Kamal Kamaraju as Kaushik Naidu, Kavitha's husband
- Vishnupriyaa Bhimeneni as Shabana
- Josh Ravi as Prabha
- Keshav Deepak as Inspector Dawood
- Mayank Parekh as ACP Harishchandra
- Nanda Gopal as Kabir Anna
- Gayathri Gupta
- Saibhanuteja Kadimisetyy
- Dasari Haribabu
- Manichandana Ayithi
- Sanaka Naveen
- Dasari Haribabu
- Pandit Goutham
- Srinivasa Naidu
- Gunturu Shankar
- Venkteswara Reddy

== Episodes ==
No.	Title	Directed by	Written by	Original release date
1	"The Blood Man"	Pavan Sadineni	Pavan Sadineni	4 August 2023
2	"The Grave"	Pavan Sadineni	Pavan Sadineni	4 August 2023
3	"Middle of Nowhere"	Pavan Sadineni	Pavan Sadineni	4 August 2023
4	"Who Are You ?"	Pavan Sadineni	Pavan Sadineni	4 August 2023
5	"The Twist"	Pavan Sadineni	Pavan Sadineni	4 August 2023
6	"The Evidence"	Pavan Sadineni	Pavan Sadineni	4 August 2023
7	"The Sorry"	Pavan Sadineni	Pavan Sadineni	4 August 2023
8	"The Saga"	Pavan Sadineni	Pavan Sadineni	4 August 2023
