= Pradeep Machiraju =

Indian television anchor and actor (born 1985)

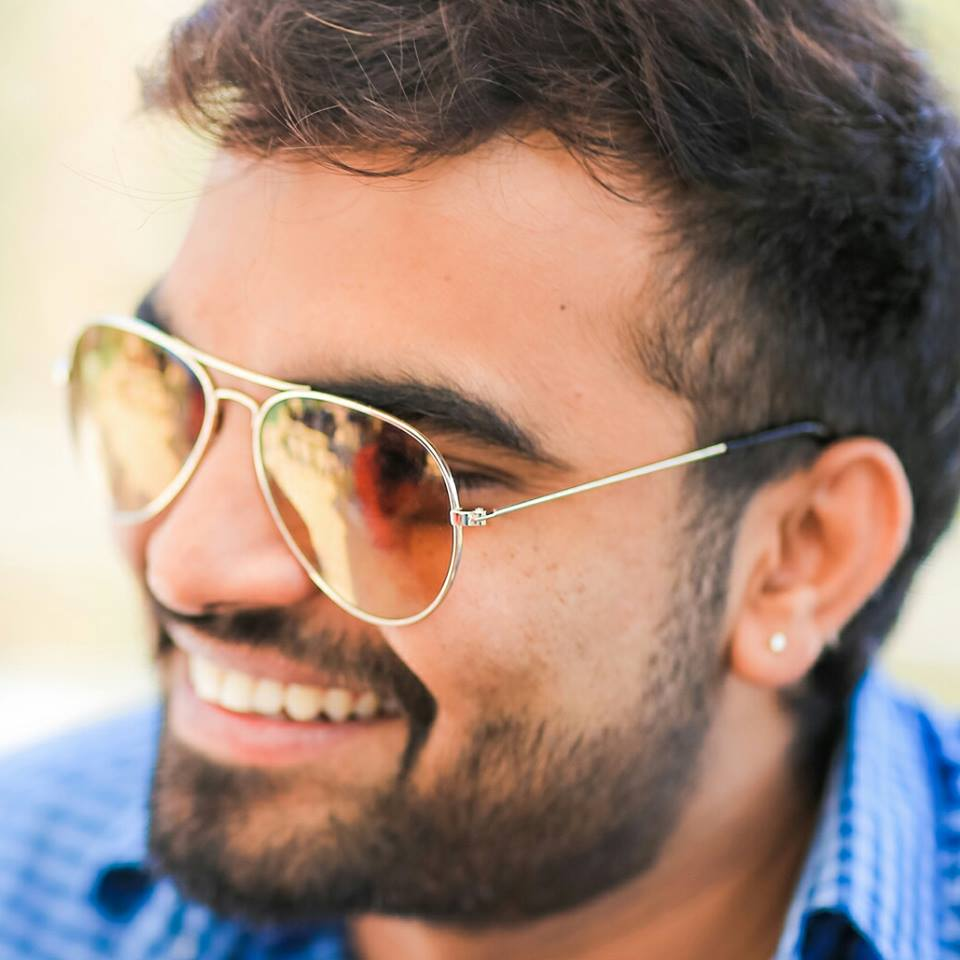
- Machiraju in 2016
- Born: Pradeep Machiraju; 23 October 1985 (age 40); Amalapuram, Andhra Pradesh, India
- Education: Vignan Institute of Technology and Science
- Occupations: Television presenter, actor
- Years active: 2010–present

Pradeep Machiraju (born 23 October 1985) is an Indian television presenter and actor who works in Telugu films and television. He is known for hosting shows such as Gadasari Atta Sogasari Kodalu and Konchem Touch Lo Unte Chepta. Machiraju won Nandi Award for Best Anchor in 2014. He made his debut as a lead actor with 30 Rojullo Preminchadam Ela (2021).

== Early life and education ==
Pradeep was born in Amalapuram, East Godavari district of Andhra Pradesh and brought up in Hyderabad. After studying at St. Alphonsa's High School, Hyderabad, he did his bachelor's degree in Electrical and electronics engineering from Vignan Institute of Technology and Science. He started his career as Radio Jockey at Radio Mirchi.

== Filmography ==
| Year | Title | Role(s) | Notes |
|---|---|---|---|
| 2010 | Varudu | Abhiram | |
| 2011 | 100% Love | Student | |
| 2012 | Julayi | Ravi's friend | |
| 2013 | Attarintiki Daredi | Shekhar's relative | |
| 2013 | Ramayya Vasthavayya | Ajay | |
| 2015 | Bham Bolenath | Rocky | |
| 2021 | 30 Rojullo Preminchadam Ela | Arjun / Abbayigaru | Debut as Lead role |
| 2025 | Akkada Ammayi Ikkada Abbayi | Krishna | |

=== Television ===
- Big Celebrity Challenge (Season 1 & 2) on Zee Telugu
- Gadasari Atha Sogasari Kodalu on Zee Telugu
- Adhurs on ETV
- Nartanasala on ETV
- Konchem Touch Lo Unte Chepta (Season 1–4) on Zee Telugu
- Express Raja on ETV Plus
- Dhee (Season 9–14) on ETV
- Pelli Choopulu on Star Maa
- Kick on ETV Plus
- Super Serial Championship (Season 2) on Zee Telugu
- Pradeep Darbar on Zee Telugu
- Drama Juniors (Season 1–3&5) on Zee Telugu
- Comedy Khiladeelu on Zee Telugu
- Local Gangs on Zee Telugu
- Lakshmi Devi Talupu Tadite on Zee Telugu
- Sa Re Ga Ma Pa The Next Singing ICON on Zee Telugu
- Super Serial Championship (Season 3) on Zee Telugu
- Super Queen on Zee Telugu
- Ladies and gentlemen on Zee Telugu
- Sarkaar (Season 1–3) on Aha
- BB Jodi (Season 2) on Star Maa
