= Savitri (2016 film) =

- Directed by: Pavan Sadineni
- Written by: Pavan Sadineni
- Produced by: Dr. V. B. Rajendra Prasad
- Starring: Nara Rohit; Nanditha Raj
- Cinematography: A. Vasanth
- Edited by: Goutham Nerusu
- Music by: Shravan Bharadwaj
- Production company: Vision Film Makers
- Release date: 1 April 2016
- Running time: 128 minutes
- Country: India
- Language: Telugu

Savitri is a 2016 Telugu action romantic-comedy film directed by Pavan Sadineni and starring Nara Rohit and Nanditha Raj in the lead roles.

It is a modern adaptation of the Indian folktale of Savitri and Satyavan.

== Plot ==
Savitri (Nanditha) is crazy about getting married right from her childhood days. In fact, she was born during her relative's marriage. With this being her sole aim, she convinces her family to find a suitable groom for her. Her family decides to get Savitri married to Rishi (Nara Rohit), although both of them are not aware of this decision. While on her way to Shiridi, Savitri meets Rishi, who instantly falls in love with her even though she is not interested. Due to some circumstances, both of them miss the train. During their journey to catch the train, Rishi tells his family that he is not interested in marrying the girl they chose as he is in love with someone now. Later Rishi finds out that Savitri was the one he was going to marry. He explains the mistake he made to Savitri's father who does not agree to the union. Rishi stays in the same village for a month and convinces Savitri's entire family and wins his love.

== Cast ==
- Nara Rohit as Rishi
- Nanditha Raj as Savitri
- Posani Krishna Murali
- Murali Sharma as Dora Babu
- Ajay as Dora Babu's brother
- Ravi Babu
- Jeeva
- Vennela Kishore as NRI
- Satyam Rajesh as Gayathri's husband
- Sreemukhi
- Dhanya Balakrishna as Gayathri
- Satya
- Madhunandan
- Pammi Sai as Pammi, Rishi's friend
- Prabhas Sreenu as Rishi's friend
- Shakalaka Shankar
- Rama Prabha

== Production ==
The film was launched on 27 June 2015 in Hyderabad.

== Soundtrack ==
Savitri

Soundtrack album by Shravan
- Released: 4 March 2016
- Genre: Film score
- Length: 24:11
- Label: Vel Records
- Producer: Shravan

Shravan chronology
Prema Ishq Kaadhal (2013)	Savitri (2016)	Meeku Mere Maaku Meme (2016)

Shravan, who worked with Sadineni in his previous directorial venture, Prema Ishq Kaadhal, was roped in to compose the soundtrack and background score. The soundtrack was released on 4 March 2016 at a glittering ceremony with Nandamuri Balakrishna as chief guest.

No.	Title	Lyrics	Singer(s)	Length
1.	"Anaganaga"	Krishna Chaitanya	Shravan	3:35
2.	"Fly Like A Bird"	Krishna Chaitanya	Yazin Nizar	3:26
3.	"Pillo O Pillo"	Kittu Vissapragada	Hemachandra, Lalitha Kavya	4.06
4.	"Teenmaar"	Krishna Chaitanya	Nara Rohith	3:15
5.	"Chitramainadi"	Krishna Chaitanya	K.S. Chitra, Sai Charan	4:02
6.	"Savitri"	Balaji	Sai Krishna	2:11
7.	"Pillo O Pillo (Remix)"	Kittu Vissapragada	Hemachandra	3:36
Total length:				24:11

== Release ==
A premiere of the film was held on 31 March 2016.

=== Reception ===
A critic from Filmfare wrote that "Apart from some sequences before the climax, even the second half doesn't evoke any interest. But it's worth watching".
