= Pondfreaks =

Indian film production company

Pondfreaks Entertainment
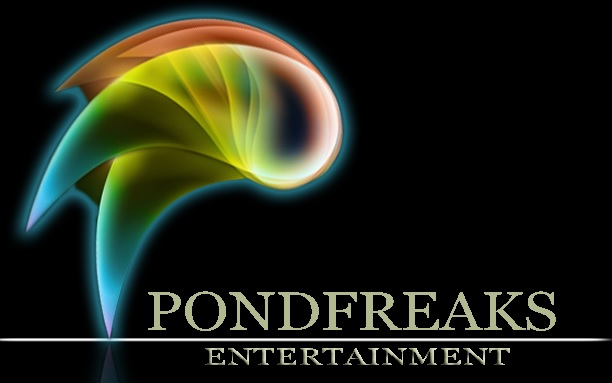
- Industry: Film production
- Founded: 2007
- Founder: Edward Stevenson Pereji, Karthik Gattamneni, Vijay Bhanu, Goutham Nerusu, Seshu Vardhan G, Vijay Kiran Varma, Ajay Kiran Varma and Lalith
- Headquarters: Hyderabad, Andhra Pradesh, India
- Key people: Karthik Gattamneni, Edward Stevenson Pereji, Vijay Bhanu, Seshu, Vijay Kiran Varma and Ajay Kiran Varma
- Products: Films, Short films
- Website: http://www.pondfreaks.com

Pondfreaks Entertainment is a short film production house from Hyderabad.

Pondfreaks Entertainment have formed one of the leading Short film studios in Andhra Pradesh & Telangana, India. The studio's activities span across creative development, production and marketing the short films.

The studio has produced short movies including Coin, Infinity, Invisible fish and Bewars.

== History ==
The Pondfreaks entertainment has started long back in 2007. The key initiators of the Studio are Karthik Gattamneni, Edward Sunny, Vijay Bhanu, Goutham Nerusu, Ajay Kiran Varma, Seshu, Vijay Kiran Varma, and Kunaal. Initially, the studio was named as "Eddykar Productions", but later it has been changed to "Pondfreaks entertainment".The team consists of alumni from Rajiv Menon MindScreen Film Institute, Satyajit ray Film & Television Institute, Annapurna College of Film and Media, ISB Hyderabad and BITS Pilani. Their filmography includes around 11 short films, which are critically acclaimed. In late 2011, Oklahoma Sooners Production (another shortfilm production studio) has merged with Pondfreaks entertainment to produce two movies and a music video: Infinity and Bewars (Films), Lost (Music Video).

== Making style ==
Initial stages almost every shortfilm from Pondfreaks Entertainment has been shot on a Sony handycam. Later it has been upgraded with 3CCD MiniDV camcorder. F&I is the first short film from Pondfreaks Entertainment to be shot on Canon EOS 7D. Pondfreaks is the first shortfilm studio in India to try underwater shots (in Invisible fish) with Canon EOS 7D.

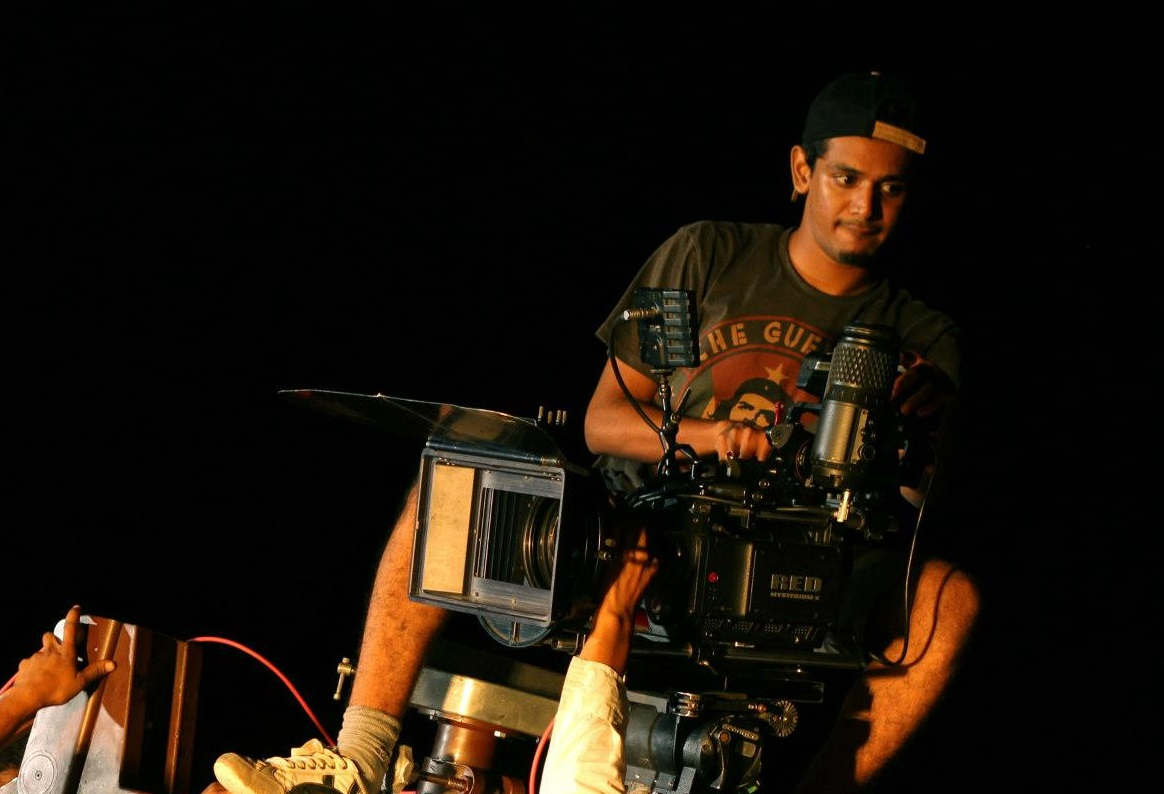
Cinematographer and Director Karthik Gattamneni

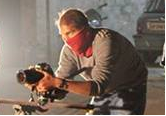
Cinematographer Vijay Bhanu

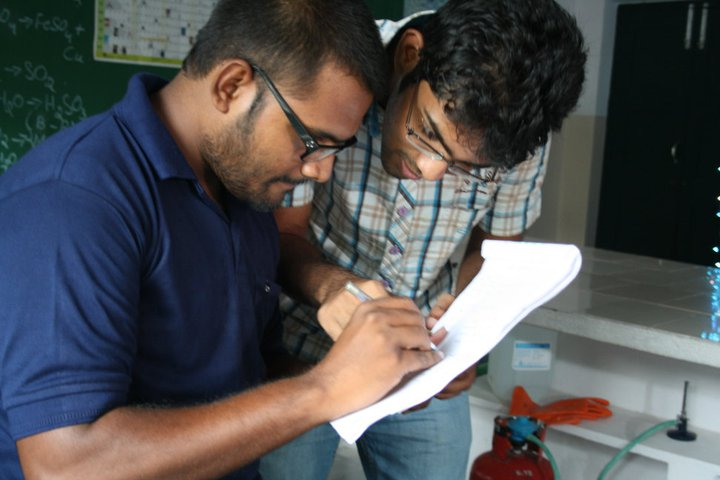
Executive Producer Edward doing a last minute check.

== Notable filmography ==
Year	Film	Notes
2006	Cinemawale	
2006	Highway	
2007	Alive	"Winner: Best short film award in various contests."
2007	Joy and Soul	
2008	Rebound	
2008	Swap	"Winner: Best short film award in various contests."
2008	4 pm	
2008	Clash	
2009	Closed doors	"Winner: Best short film award in various contests."
2010	Sunshine	"Critically acclaimed in FTII."
2010	Loco	
2010	Interviewing a film student	"Documentary"
2010	What's he upto in there!	
2011	Coin	"Winner: Best short film award in various contests."
2011	F&I	
2011	Invisible Fish	"First Indian short film to shoot underwater."
2011	Where's Kevin	
2012	My Past three Girlfriends	
2012	That boy this girl	
2012	Lost	"Music Video; First collaboration of Pondfreaks and Oklahoma Sooners"
2012	Infinity	"Winner: Best short film award in various contests."
2012	Bewars	"Produced by Oklahoma Sooners Production"

== Feature films ==
Year	Film	Notes
2013	Oopiri (Feature Film)	"Directed by Edward Stevenson Pereji; Produced by Raja Raveendar. Though the film was not released from Pondfreaks, Pondfreaks has extended its services in styling of trailer and many other aspects for the film."
2013	Prema Ishq Kaadhal (Feature Film)	"Released On 6 Dec 2013"
2014	Surya VS Surya (Feature Film)	"Production"
Unscheduled	MARIO	Shoot in Progress
