= Shekar =

Indian political cartoonist (1965–2014)

- Born: 16 July 1965
- Died: 19 May 2014 (aged 48)
- Education: Kakatiya University

Kambalapally Chandra Shekar (16 July 1965 – 19 May 2014) was an Indian cartoonist known for his political cartoons in English and in Telugu.

== Early life ==
He was born to a Telugu family in Suryapet, in the Nalgonda district of Andhra Pradesh. He completed his BSc degree in 1985 from Nagarjuna Government College in Nalgonda, followed by an MA in Telugu literature from Kakatiya University, Warangal.

== Career ==
He started his career with the Prajasakti, a left-wing newspaper, in 1989. He later worked for the New Indian Express and Andhra Jyothy. He also founded a forum for political cartoonists in Andhra Pradesh.

As of 2011, nearly 45,000 of Shekar's cartoons had appeared in English, Punjabi, Bengali, Kannada, and Marathi through his cartoon syndicate Shekartoons. His fourth book of cartoons, Gidee Telangana, was released in March 2010 in Hyderabad, India.

Shekar visited Washington DC, New York, Los Angeles, Ohio, Florida in June and July 2011 on IVLP programme on Political cartoonists among three from India. His last English cartoons book, Colours of India (2011), was launched in America and India too.

== Death ==
Shekar Kambalapally died on 19 May 2014 after a prolonged illness. He is survived by his wife Chandrakala and his children Nandu and Chetana.
