= Sa Re Ga Ma Pa The Singing Superstar =

- Season 14
- Starring: Judges; Koti; S. P. Sailaja; Smita; Ananta Sriram
- Presented by: Sreemukhi
- No. of contestants: 24
- Winner: Shruthika Samudhrala
- Runner-up: J.V. Sudhanshu
- No. of episodes: 25

Release
- Original network: Zee Telugu
- Original release: 20 February – 14 August 2022

Season chronology
- ← Previous; Sa Re Ga Ma Pa The Next Singing ICON Next → Sa Re Ga Ma Pa Championship

Sa Re Ga Ma Pa The Singing Superstar is the 14th season of the Indian Telugu-language musical/singing reality television show Sa Re Ga Ma Pa Telugu. It premiered on Zee Telugu from 20 February 2022. Shruthika Samudhrala is the winner of the season. J.V. Sudhanshu is the First Runner-up.

== Production ==
The show was officially announced in December 2021. In early-February 2022, a teaser trailer of the show was released revealing that Sreemukhi is returning as the presenter after the 13th season. Koti and S. P. Sailaja returned as the judges from the previous season with Smita making her comeback to television after Dance with Me and Ananta Sriram making his debut in the television as judge. Initially M. M. Srilekha was roped in as a judge, which marked her return to the show after a long time. As she is suffered from COVID-19 pandemic, S. P. Sailaja replaced her as one of the judges. D. Satya Sivakumar, Arun Kaundinya and Srikanth Ippili were hired as the voice trainers of the show.

=== Auditions ===
Before conducting on-ground auditions, a digital version of the auditions were held in early-December 2021 soon after the announcement of the show. On-ground auditions of the show were held across ten cities in Andhra Pradesh and Telangana. Khammam auditions were held on 12 December 2021. The next day Visakhapatnam auditions were held at Suryabagh, followed by the Tirupati auditions on 14 December 2021 and Vijayawada auditions on 15 December 2021. Hyderabad auditions were held on 23 December 2021 at Padmalaya Studios.

== Judges ==
- Koti
- S. P. Sailaja
- Smita
- Ananta Sriram

== Mentors ==
- Geetha Madhuri
- Sri Krishna
- Saketh Komanduri
- LV Revanth

== Guests ==
Guest	Episode(s) No.	Ref.
Pooja Hegde	1	
Sumanth	1	
Varshini Sounderajan	1	
Yuvan Shankar Raja	2	
Boney Kapoor	2	
Kartikeya Gummakonda	2	
Rajasekhar	4	
Jeevitha	4	
Anup Rubens	4	
Shruti Haasan	25	
Nithiin	25	
Krithi Shetty	25	
P. Susheela	25	
Deva Katta	25	

== Contestants ==
Contestant	Home town/place
Sudhanshu	Rajahmundry
Dasari Parvathi	Kurnool
Daniel	Konkuduru
Pranav Kaushik	United States
Vinod Sharma	Kadapa
Arjun Vijay	Alappuzha
Sai Sanvid	Hyderabad
Vinuthna	Kurnool
Charan Tej	Chikkaballapur
Sai Sri Charan	Hyderabad
Shivani	Hyderabad
Akhil	Hyderabad
Shruthika Samudhrala	Hyderabad
Astha	Mumbai
Shaik Rasool	Ipurupalem
Keerthana	Vijayawada
Kalyani	Warangal
Swaroop	Chennai
Satya Sri	Visakhapatnam
Harsha	Wanaparthy
Abhinav	Kakinada
Gayathri	Amalapuram
Myna	Warangal
Deepthi	Bangalore
