= Vithika Sheru =

Indian film actress (born 1994)

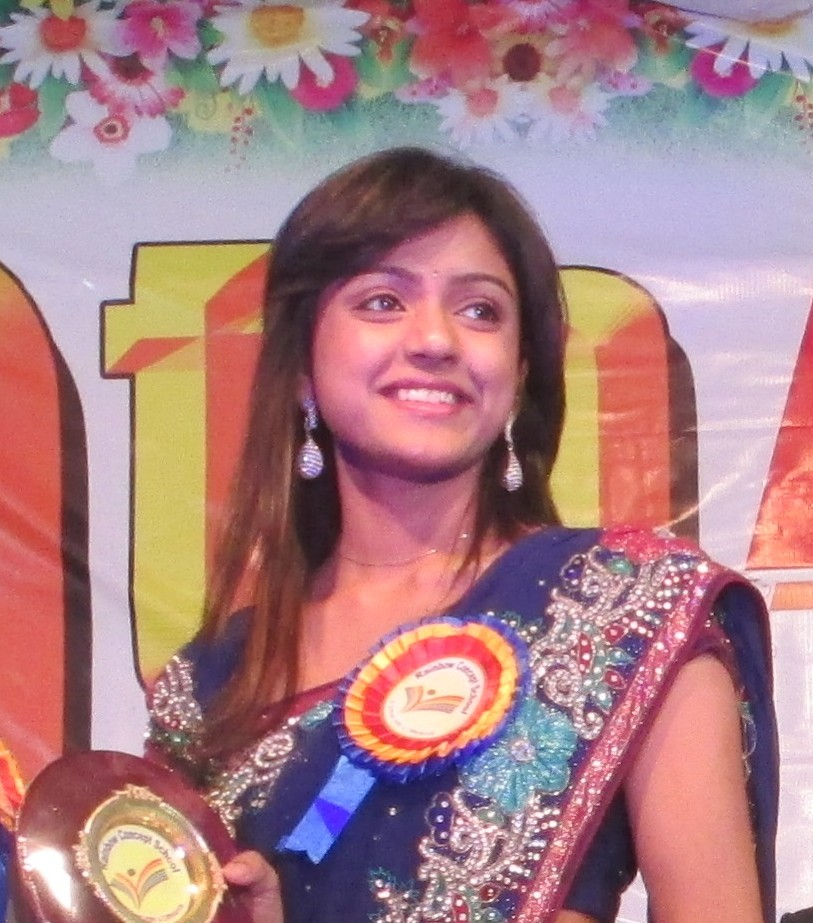
- Sheru in 2014
- Born: 2 February 1994 (age 32); Bhimavaram, Andhra Pradesh, India
- Other name: Keerthi
- Occupation: Actress
- Years active: 2008–present
- Spouse: Varun Sandesh

Vithika Sheru (born 2 February 1994) is an Indian actress who has appeared in Telugu, Tamil, and Kannada films. In 2019, she entered the reality TV show Bigg Boss Telugu 3 as a contestant.

== Early life ==
Vithika Sheru was born on 2 February 1994, in Bhimavaram, Andhra Pradesh. She completed her education in Mumbai and Hyderabad. She pursued a graduate diploma in fashion design from the Lakhotia Institute of Design, Abids, Hyderabad.

== Personal life ==
She is married to actor Varun Sandesh, her co-star in Paddanandi Premalo Mari (2015).

== Career ==
Sheru started acting as a child artist at age 11, appearing in Telugu television series and making her film debut at age 15 in the Kannada film Anthu Inthu Preethi Banthu. She stated that her Kannada debut happened by chance when she accompanied her aunt, who is a stylist, to the film sets where she was spotted and offered a role in the film. A remake of the Telugu film Aadavari Matalaku Ardhale Verule, she played the role that Swati Reddy played in the original, after which she appeared in another Kannada film Ullasa Utsaha.

She then went on to work in Telugu cinema. During 2008 and 2009, she starred under the name Keerthi in a few low-budget Telugu films like Preminchu Rojullo, Chalo 123 and My Name is Amrutha. She later worked as a supporting actress in the films Jhummandi Naadam and Bheemili Kabaddi Jattu, before landing a lead role in the Telugu film Prema Ishq Kaadhal. She played the role of a college student in the film, for which she also did the complete costume styling. In 2014, she made her Tamil film debut with the unreleased film Uyir Mozhi, in which she played a visually challenged girl. To prepare for the role, she said, she had to learn braille and was blindfolded for many days.

In 2015, she appeared as a lead in Paddanandi Premalo Mari directed by debutant Mahesh Upputuri. She played Shravani, a girl "who is both traditional and modern and changes her attitude depending on situations", and also designed her own costumes for the film. She has completed her second Tamil film Mahabalipuram. She also shot for a Tamil film titled Vedikkai along with Vidharth.

== Filmography ==
Year	Film	Role	Language	Notes
2008	Anthu Inthu Preethi Banthu	Neelambike	Kannada	
2009	Ullasa Utsaha	Geetha	Kannada	credited as Keerthi
2009	Preminche Rojullo	Keerthy	Telugu	credited as Keerthi
2010	Sandadi	Swathi	Telugu	credited as Keerthi
2010	Jhummandi Naadam	Balu's friend	Telugu	credited as Keerthi
2010	Bheemili Kabaddi Jattu	Suri's lover	Telugu	Uncredited
2013	Prema Ishq Kaadhal	Sarayu	Telugu	
2015	Paddanandi Premalo Mari	Shravani	Telugu	
2015	Mahabalipuram	Mahalakshmi	Tamil	
2021	Pelli SandaD	Janaki	Telugu	

== Television ==
Year	Title	Role	Channel	Language	Notes
2000	Chakravaakam	Child Artist	Gemini	Telugu	Daily Serial
2019	Bigg Boss Telugu 3	Contestant	Star Maa	Telugu	Reality TV series
2020	Sa Ma Ja Vara Ga Ma na	Host	ETV Telugu	Telugu	Music show
2022	Bigg Boss Telugu 6	Guest	Star Maa	Telugu	To support Keerthi Bhat; Reality TV series
2024	Bigg Boss Telugu 8	Guest	Star Maa	Telugu	Along with Punarnavi Bhupalam; Reality TV series
