= Punarnavi Bhupalam =

Indian actress

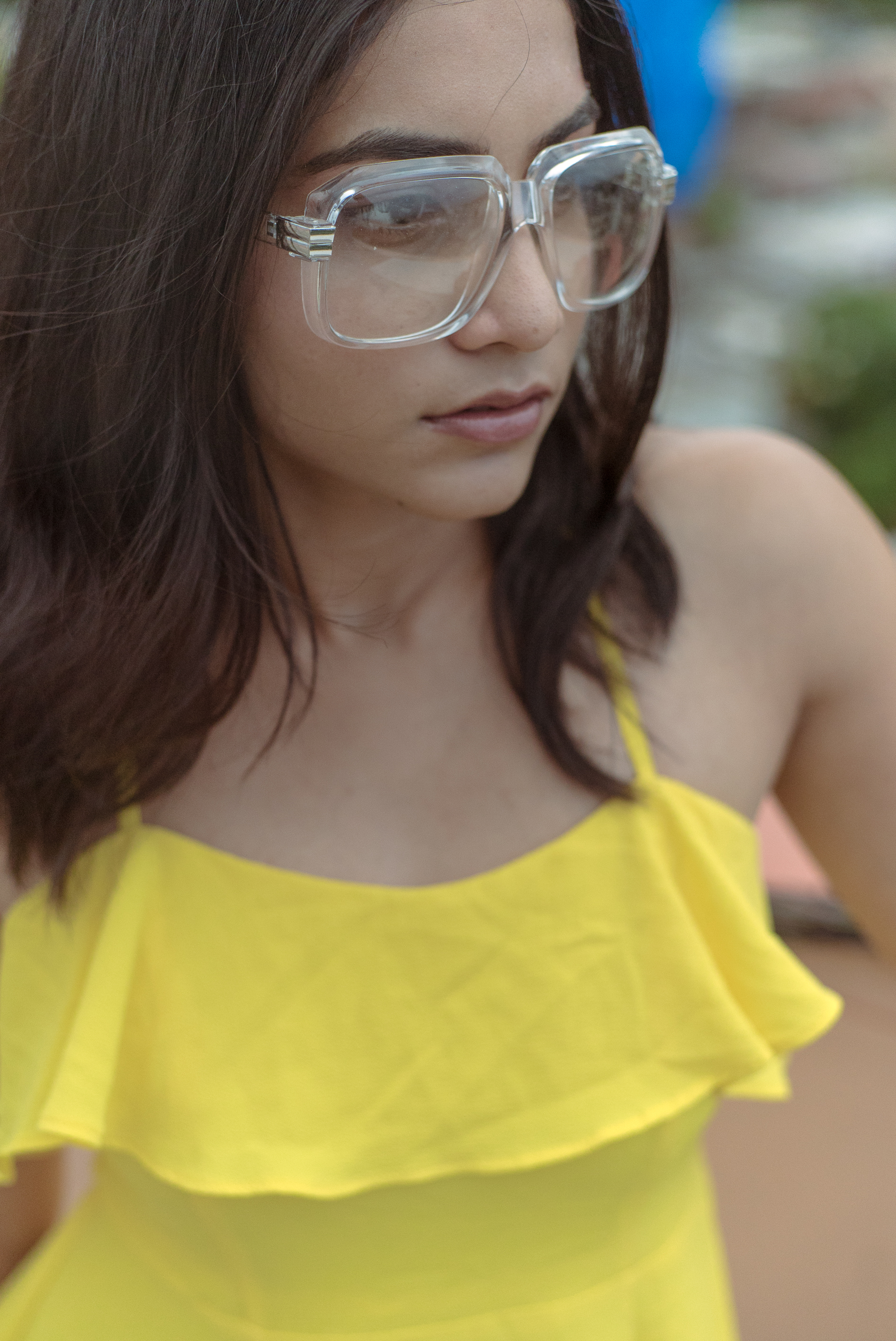
- Bhupalam in 2017.
- Born: 28 May 1996 (age 30); Tenali, Andhra Pradesh, India
- Occupation: Actress
- Years active: 2013 - Present

Punarnavi Bhupalam (born 28 May 1996) is an Indian actress who works in Telugu films and television. She was nominated for Filmfare Award as Best Supporting Actress – Telugu for her debut in Uyyala Jampala (2013).

== Early life ==
Punarnavi Bhupalam was born in Tenali, Andhra Pradesh to Bhagya Lakshmi and Nagesh Kumar. Her great-grandfather Bhupalam Subbarayudu Setty was a freedom fighter from Jammalamadugu, Cuddapah district, Andhra Pradesh. Her family is settled in Hyderabad. Bhupalam did her schooling in Vijayawada and Hyderabad, and graduated in psychology and journalism.

== Career ==
Bhupalam started as a theatre student and ended up in movies at the age 17, her debut as a supporting role in the movie Uyyala Jampala was nominated for Filmfare Award for Best Supporting Actress – Telugu.

== Filmography ==
| Year | Title | Role | Notes | Reference |
|---|---|---|---|---|
| 2013 | Uyyala Jampala | Sunitha | Debut film Nominated-Filmfare Award for Best Supporting Actress – Telugu | |
| 2015 | Malli Malli Idhi Rani Roju | Parvathi | | |
| 2015 | Ee Cinema Superhit Guarantee | Sirisha | | |
| 2016 | Pittagoda | Divya | | |
| 2018 | Manasuku Nachindi | Lalli | | |
| 2018 | Enduko Emo | Harika | | |
| 2020 | Oka Chinna Viramam | Maya | | |
| 2020 | Cycle | Charita | | |

== Television ==
| Year | Show | Role | Network | Notes | Ref(s) |
|---|---|---|---|---|---|
| 2019 | Bigg Boss 3 | Contestant | Star Maa | Reality TV Series | |
| 2019 | Alitho Saradaga | Guest | ETV | Talk Show | |
| 2020 | 2020 Anukunnadi Okati Ayyinadi Okati | Guest | ETV | Telefilm | |

== Web series ==
| Year | Series | Role | Network | Language | Ref(s) |
|---|---|---|---|---|---|
| 2020 | CommitMental | Anu | Aha | Telugu | |
