= Sreemukhi =

Indian actress and television presenter

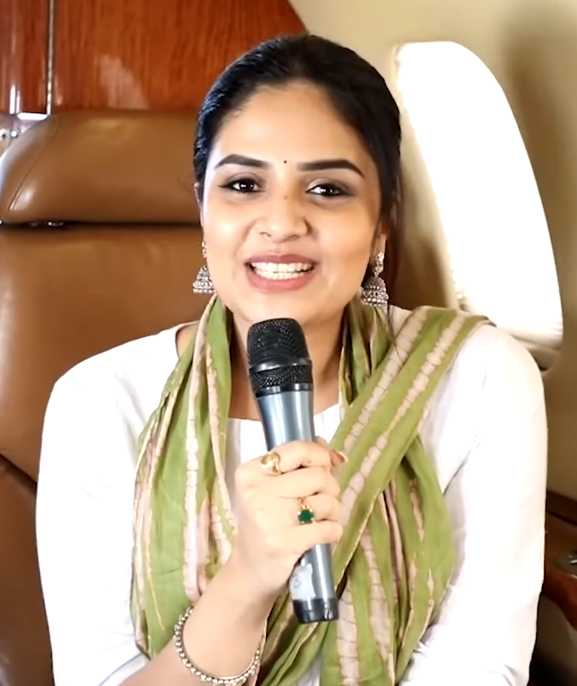
- Sreemukhi in 2022
- Born: 10 May 1993 (age 33); Nizamabad, India
- Occupations: Actress; television presenter
- Years active: 2012 – present

Sreemukhi (born 10 May 1993) is an Indian television presenter and actress who works in Telugu films and television. She was a contestant in Telugu Bigg Boss 3 and emerged as First Runner-up of the show. She started her career as a television host and made her film debut with a supporting role in Julai (2012). She later played the lead role in Prema Ishq Kaadhal (2013). Sreemukhi is one of the highest-paid personalities in Telugu television.

== Early life and career ==
Sreemukhi was born on 10 May 1993 in Nizamabad of present-day Telangana, India. She studied dentistry in her graduation. Before making her debut into films, Sreemukhi started her career with hosting a TV show Adhurs and also hosted the singing program Super Singer 9. Sreemukhi made her film debut as Raaji in Julai as Allu Arjun's sister under the direction of Trivikram Srinivas and Prema Ishq Kaadhal as lead actress in the direction of Pavan Sadineni. She also acted in Nenu Sailaja as the sister of Ram in movie as Swecha. The following year she did a small cameo in Sekhar Kammula's Life is Beautiful and was the lead actress in Dhanalakshmi Talupu Tadithey and Nara Rohit's Savitri. Along with these she also made her first feature film in Tamil, Ettuthikkum Madhayaanai paired opposite Sathya. Her 2015 Kannada–Telugu bilingual film Chandrika, marked her debut in Kannada cinema.

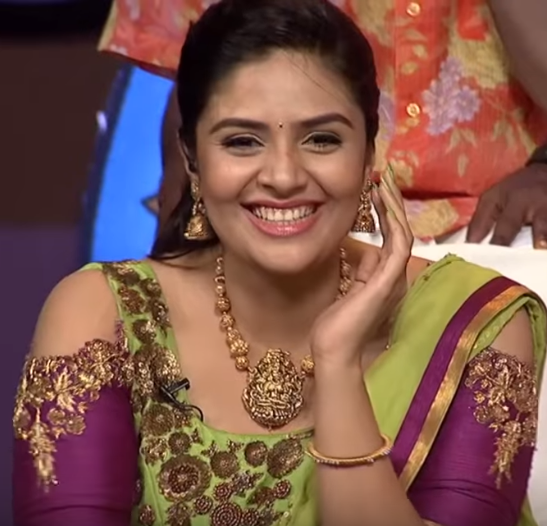
Sreemukhi in 2018 on the set of a TV show

In 2015, Sreemukhi co-hosted the South Indian International Movie Awards (SIIMA) in Dubai. She also hosted stand up comedy show Pataas for ETV Plus, Bhale Chance Le for Star Maa, and appeared in the film Gentleman. In 2019, she entered season 3 of Bigg Boss Telugu as a contestant where she finished as a runner up.

In 2021, Sreemukhi returned to cinema playing the lead in the film Crazy Uncles. A reviewer from The Times of India wrote, "Sreemukhi deserves better than a film that uses a ‘good message’ as an excuse to minimise her to nothing but a glam doll. She looks gorgeous as ever but the film offers her no scope to perform."

== Filmography ==
=== Films ===
- All films are in Telugu, unless otherwise noted.

Year	Title	Role	Notes	Ref.
2012	Julayi	Rajani aka Raji		
2012	Life Is Beautiful	Sonia		
2013	Prema Ishq Kaadhal	Shanthi	Debut film as lead actress	
2015	Ettuthikkum Madhayaanai	Sarah	Tamil film	
2015	Chandrika	Shilpa	Bilingual film (Kannada and Telugu)	
2015	Dhanalakshmi Talupu Tadithey	Chitra		
2015	Andhra Pori	Swapna		
2016	Nenu Sailaja	Swecha		
2016	Savitri	Baby		
2016	Gentleman	Nithya		
2016	Manalo Okkadu			
2017	Babu Baga Busy	Shobha N. T.		
2021	30 Rojullo Preminchadam Ela	Herself	Cameo in "Wah Wah Mere Bawa" song	
2021	Crazy Uncles	Sweety		
2021	Maestro	Lakshmi/Lucky		
2023	Bhola Shankar	Mahalaxmi's friend		
2026	Maa Inti Bangaaram	Anasuya		

== Television ==
Year	Title	Role	Notes	Ref.
2013	Adhurs	Host		
2013	Adhurs 2	Host		
2014	Money Money	Host		
2015	4th South Indian International Movie Awards	Host		
2015	Super Mom	Host		
2015	Pataas	Host		
2016	Super Serial Championship	Host		
2017	Super Singer 9	Host		
2017	Zee Saregamapa	Host		
2018	Joolakataka	Host		
2018	Joolakataka Double dose	Host		
2018	Bhale Chance le	Host		
2018	Comedy Nights	Host		
2018	Zee Saregamapa Little champs			
2018	Gold Rush			
2019	Bigg Boss 3	Contestant	Runner-up	
2019	Drama Juniors Championship	Host		
2019–present	Start Music Reloaded	Host		
2020–present	Celebrity Kabaddi League	Host		
2020–present	Bomma Adhirindi			
2020	Bigg Boss 4	Guest		
2021	Comedy stars	Host		
2021	Zee Mahotsavam	Host		
2021	Sravanamaasam Vachindamma	Host		
2021	Comedy Stars	Host		
2021	Ala Brundavanamlo	Host		
2021	Swamy Vaari Aambaralu	Host		
2021	Chef Mantra	Host		
2022	Sa Re Ga Ma Pa The Singing Superstar	Host		
2022	Dance Ikon	Co-producer, mentor		
2022– present	Aadivaram with Star Maa Parivaaram	Host		
2023	Super Singer	Host		
2024	Neethone Dance 2.0	Host		
2024	Kiraack Boys Khiladi Girls	Host		
2024	Sa Re Ga Ma Pa The Next Singing Youth Icon	Host		
2025	Kiraack Boys Khiladi Girls Season 2	Host		
