= Prema Ishq Kaadhal =

- Theatrical poster
- Directed by: Pavan Sadineni
- Screenplay by: Pavan Sadineni
- Produced by: Bekkam Venugopal
- Starring: Harshvardhan Rane; Sree Vishnu; Harish Verma; Vithika Sheru; Ritu Varma; Sreemukhi
- Cinematography: Karthik Gattamneni
- Edited by: Goutham Nerusu
- Music by: Shravan Bharadwaj
- Production company: Lucky Media
- Release date: 6 December 2013
- Country: India
- Language: Telugu

Prema Ishq Kaadhal (transl. Love, love, love) is a 2013 Telugu anthology romantic comedy film directed by Pavan Sadineni. The film was produced by Bekkam Venugopal of Lucky Media. The film stars Harshvardhan Rane, Sree Vishnu, Harish Verma, Vithika Sheru, Ritu Varma, and Sreemukhi. The music was composed by Shravan Bharadwaj with cinematography was handled by Karthik Gattamneni and editing by Gowtham Nerusu. The film released on 6 December 2013.

The film's title contains three words that mean "love" ("Prema" in Telugu, "Ishq" in Hindi & "Kaadhal" in Tamil), and the film simultaneously depicts three love failure stories.

== Plot ==
Story 1:

Ranadhir "Randy" (Harshvardhan Rane) is a musician who runs a band in his café. One day after his performance, Sarayu (Vithika Sheru) meets him to applaud his talent. Eventually, their encounter turns into love. Sarayu encourages Randy to perform onstage. Even though music is only a hobby for him, Randy performs for Sarayu on the stage. The concert becomes a huge success, and he becomes famous. He starts performing as a full-time musician. Due to his busy schedule, there is no time for personal life, which leads to distance in his relationship with Sarayu. Sarayu loses trust in Randy's love as he avoids her. She pressures him to leave the music industry. He hesitantly agrees on the condition that he gives one last performance, but Sarayu does not accept the condition and gives Randy an ultimatum to choose between her and music. Before Randy's concert, he goes to Sarayu's residence and pleads to allow his last performance, but she does not agree. Suddenly Sarayu's brother (Ravi Prakash) catches them and creates havoc. Sarayu lies to her brother that Randy is a wayward Romeo. Heartbroken, Randy leaves her, coming to terms with her selfishness. He realizes that music is his love and life and decides to move on from her.

Story 2:

Royal Raju (Sree Vishnu) is a carefree, good-for-nothing man from West Godavari district who comes to Hyderabad to woo a city girl. He wants to show off to his cousin that he can get a more beautiful girlfriend than his cousin's. He stays with his childhood friend. One night, a car crashes into a pole in front of Raju. Raju saves the driver, a drunk woman, and admits her to a hospital. She is Sameera (Ritu Varma), an ultra modern girl working as a stylist in the film industry. They both become friends. Though Raju tries to get Sameera's attention, Sameera ignores him. He manages to join as an assistant director in Millenium Star Mahanama's (Satyam Rajesh) film to get close to her as she is the stylist for the movie. Several comical circumstances ensue, and Mahanama asks Raju to get Sameera through the casting couch. Enraged, Raju slaps him, but Sameera, who does not know the context, misunderstands and avoids him. Raju tries to apologize to her, which results in her matrimonial matchmaking becoming a disaster. Eventually, Sameera realizes that he is innocent and apologizes for misunderstanding him. Later at a film function, both get drunk and make love at her home. The next day, Raju expresses his feelings for Sameera and proposes to her, but she rejects the proposal and says that their night together was just an accident. She mentions that she does not have any feelings for him. Even though he is a dumb country brute, she was only having fun with him. Heartbroken, Raju shares his pain with his friend and decides to aim big and find a purpose in life.

Story 3:

Arjun (Harish Varma), an RJ in Radio Mirchi, is a playboy. One day he meets an orthodox girl Shanti (Sreemukhi), an IT professional from Chennai, through his friend Snigda "Sid" (Snigdha). He tries to flirt with her, but aware of his nature, she ignores him. Eventually, she agrees but only on certain conditions. Arjun proposes to her, which she neither accepts nor rejects. After a few circumstances because of Arjun, Shanti's promotion is put on hold by her boss. She starts avoiding him, claiming that she is becoming close to her boss. Later in a parking lot, Arjun notices Shanti getting intimate with her boss in his car. He realizes that he loves her very much but also questions her character. Shanti blames him for her nature and mentions that she was inspired by him to flirt with her boss (who is also interested in her) to get the promotion. She says that if they both married each other, this would be the prime reason to get a divorce. She says goodbye to him and decides to go back to Chennai. Later, Sid questions Arjun and Shanti's morals. Arjun replies that he thought the girl who cheated on him does not have character, but after meeting Shanti, he realizes that he himself does not have character either. Finally, Arjun, now a changed man, decides to apologize to every girl whom he tricked into a physical relationship.

== Cast ==
- Harshvardhan Rane as Ranadhir "Randy"
- Sree Vishnu as Royal Raju
- Harish Varma as Arjun
- Vithika Sheru as Sarayu
- Ritu Varma as Sameera
- Sreemukhi as Shanti
- Satyam Rajesh as Millennium Star Mahanama
- Satya as Mahanama's assistant
- Snigdha as Snigdha "Sid"
- Ravi Prakash as Sarayu's brother
- Edward Stevenson Pereji
- Josh Ravi as Dolly
- Chandini Chowdary as one of Arjun's girlfriends (uncredited)

== Production ==
=== Development ===
The film was in pre-production stage from January 2012 to March 2013, where director Pavan Sadineni and producer Bekkam Venugopal were keen in developing the narrative of the motion picture. During the pre-production time, Sadineni had directed a short film Bewars, in which Karthik Gattamneni was the cinematographer and Vishnu Vardhan played the protagonist. Vardhan was cast to play in Prema Ishq Kaadhal, and Harshvardhan Rane was roped in to play a rockstar in the film. Vithika Sheru, who is paired opposite him also donned the hat of a stylist for the film, while Rane worked as the choreographer for the climax song.

Karthik Gattamneni, who is famous for cinematography and direction of short films from the studio Pondfreaks Entertainment, was the film's cinematographer.

=== Filming ===
The principal photography for the movie began on 9 April 2013, and the major scenes were shot in a special coffee shop set that was erected specially for this movie at Nanakramguda. The filming of the movie was expected to end in May 2013.

The producer planned to select 100 city students and record their responses to the film and carry out the changes they suggest. The film was shot in 50 days.

== Soundtrack ==
Prema Ishq Kaadhal

Soundtrack album by Various
- Released: 24 October 2013
- Genre: Score
- Label: Madhura Audio

Various chronology
Alias Jaanaki (2013)	Prema Ishq Kaadhal (2013)

The soundtrack with six songs, composed by Shravan was released on 24 October 2013 through Madhura Audio.

Track list
No.	Title	Lyrics	Singer(s)	Length
1.	"Prema Ishq Kaadhal"	Krishna Chaitanya	Shravan	4:30
2.	"Tulle Tulle"	Krishna Kanth	Sai Charan	4:04
3.	"Sammatame"	Krishna Chaitanya	Sai Krishna	4:21
4.	"Gundu Soodhi"	Krishna Chaitanya	Varun Madhav	3:48
5.	"Chetakaani"	Krishna Chaitanya	Shravan	5:08
6.	"Tulle Tulle (Remixed)"	Krishna Kanth	Shravan	3:55
Total length:				25:48
