= Danish Aslam =

Indian film director

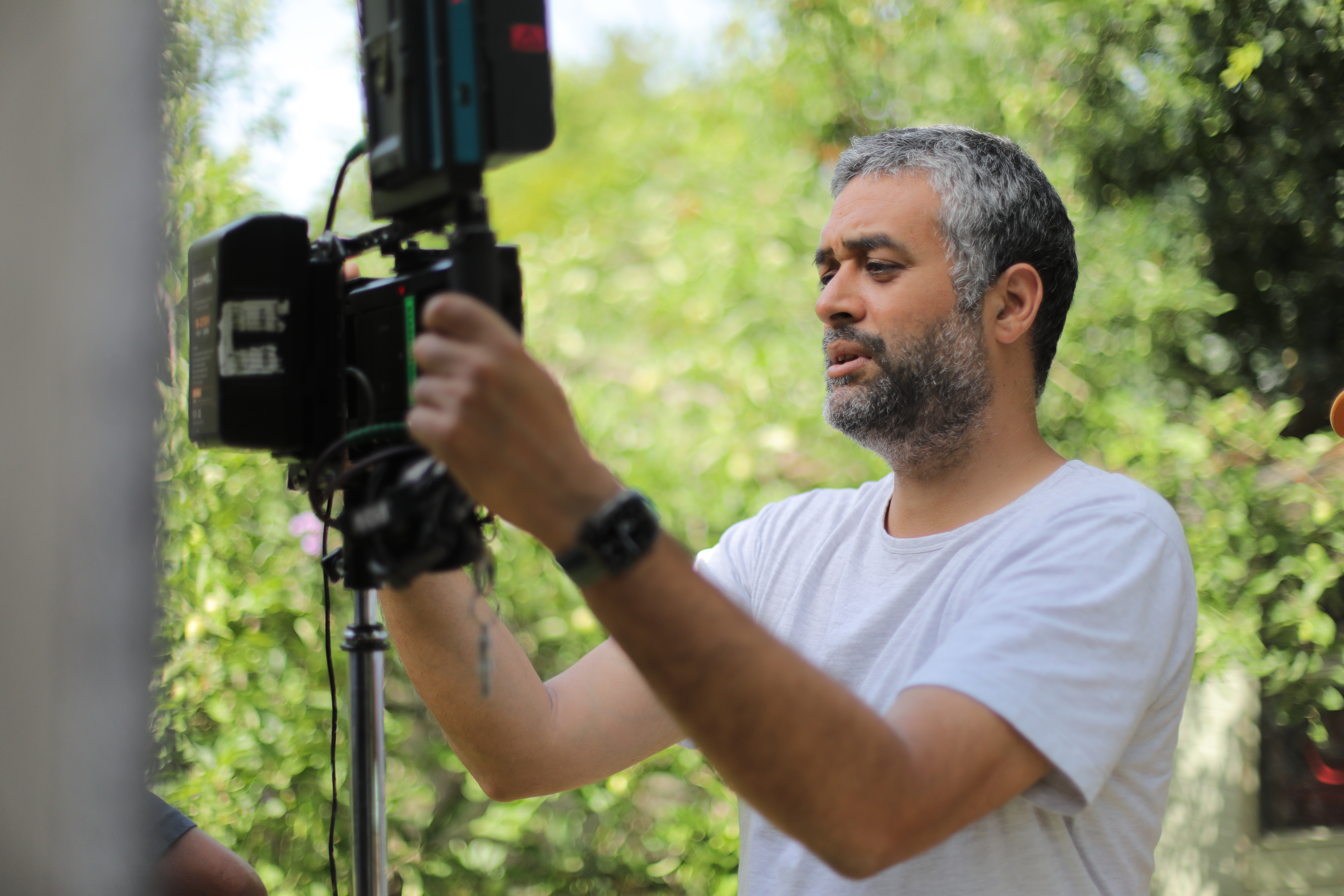
- Danish Aslam during the shoot of 'Khwaabon Ka Jhamela' in London, UK.
- Born: Hyderabad, India
- Education: The Mother's International School, New Delhi, Sri Venkateswara College and Jamia Millia Islamia
- Occupation: Filmmaker
- Years active: 2003–present
- Spouse: Shruti Seth (m. 2010)
- Children: 1

Danish Aslam is an Indian film director and screenwriter who works in Hindi film, television and streaming productions. After working as an assistant director on films including Lakshya, Swades, Salaam Namaste, Fanaa, Ta Ra Rum Pum and Thoda Pyaar Thoda Magic, he made his feature-film directing debut with the romantic comedy-drama Break Ke Baad (2010).

Aslam subsequently directed television and streaming series including It's Not That Simple, Time Out, Flesh, The Reunion – Chal Chalein Apne Ghar and an episode of the Netflix anthology Feels Like Ishq. His second feature film, Khwaabon Ka Jhamela, was released in 2024.

== Early life and education ==
Danish lived in Bangladesh and Delhi while growing up. He attended The Mother's International School in New Delhi, studied English at Sri Venkateswara College, and completed a master's degree in mass communication at Jamia Millia Islamia.

== Career ==
=== Early work and Break Ke Baad ===
Before becoming a director, Danish worked as an assistant director on films including Lakshya, Swades, Salaam Namaste, Being Cyrus, Fanaa, Ta Ra Rum Pum and Thoda Pyaar Thoda Magic. He initially intended to become a cinematographer before moving into direction.

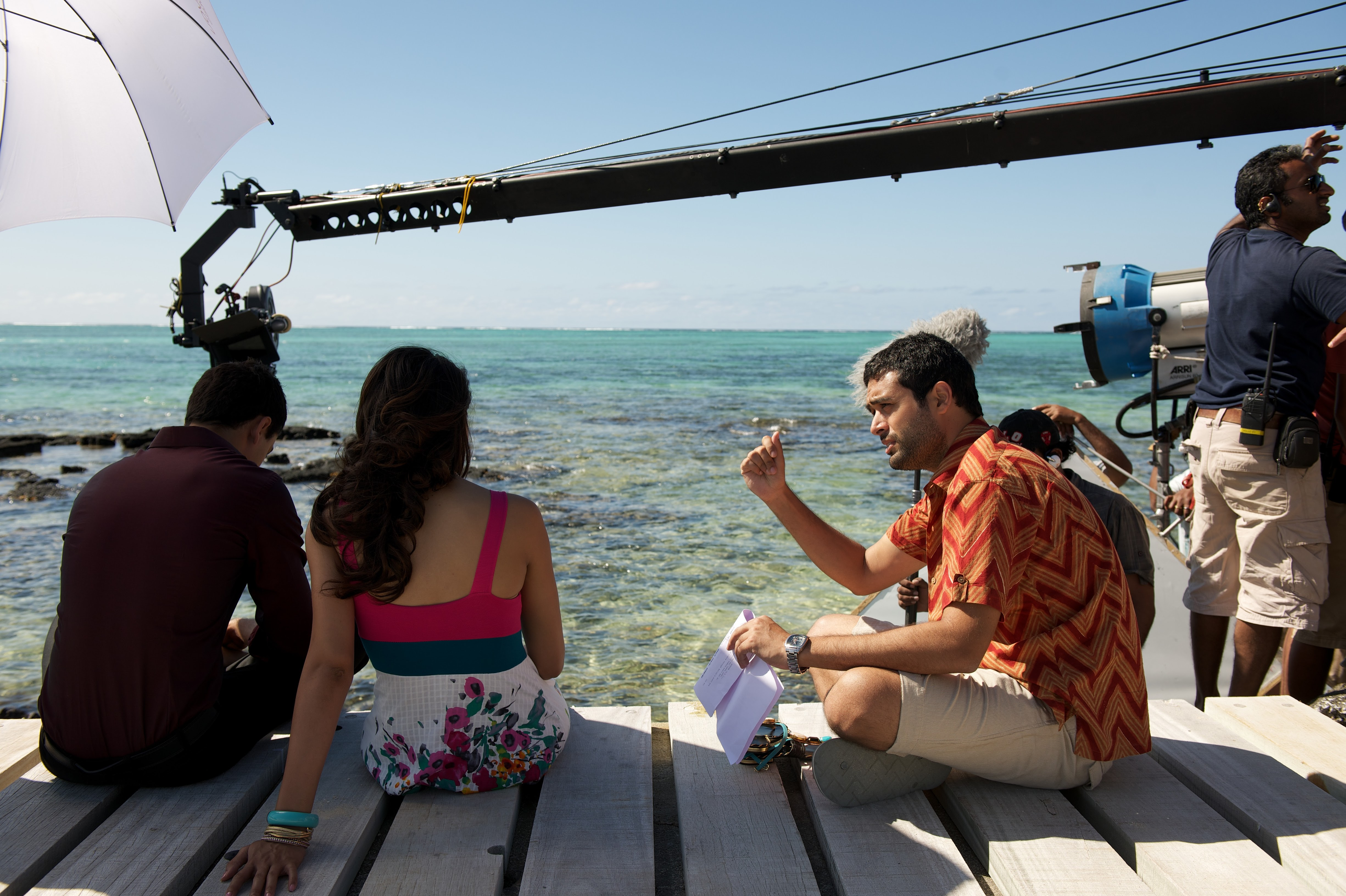
Danish rehearsing with Imran Khan and Deepika Padukone during the filming of Break Ke Baad in Mauritius.

Danish made his directorial debut with Break Ke Baad (2010), produced by Kunal Kohli. The project originated with an idea by Ankur Tewari. Danish developed a story draft and subsequently worked on the script with Renuka Kunzru, who wrote the screenplay and dialogue. Aniruddha Guha of DNA described the film as a "rom-com that gets it right". Michael Ordoña of the Los Angeles Times praised its modern relationships but criticised the later screenplay.

=== Television and streaming ===
Between 2013 and 2015, Danish directed several television shows for various networks.

- Yeh Hai Aashiqui (2013–2014): A romantic drama series for Bindass channel
- Love by Chance (2014): A series for Bindass channel
- Siyaasat (2014–2015): A historical drama series for Epic channel
- Kabhi Aise Geet Gaya Karo (2015): A mini-series for Disney channel

Danish entered streaming in 2016 with It's Not That Simple, a Voot series starring Swara Bhasker, and returned to direct its second season in 2018. His move came during an early expansion of India's streaming market: Netflix launched in India in January 2016 and Amazon Prime Video arrived later that year, while Voot launched in March. Reviewing the second season, The New Indian Express praised its "sharp writing and plotting curves" and the maturity of the performances.

In 2017, Danish directed Time Out, a Voot series starring Tahir Raj Bhasin and Sarah-Jane Dias. It was included in GQ India and Firstpost lists of the best web series of 2017.

Danish's 2020 series Flesh, an eight-part crime drama about human trafficking for Eros Now, starred Bhasker and Akshay Oberoi. The darker thriller was a departure from his relationship-centred work; Danish has described dysfunctional relationships as a recurring interest in his writing and directing. Gautam Batra of Koimoi called the direction "superb" and praised the "gripping and tight" screenplay. Pramit Chatterjee of Mashable India described Danish as "masterful of his direction and tone".

In 2021, Danish directed The Reunion – Chal Chalein Apne Ghar for The Zoom Studios and co-wrote it with Shyni Shetty. The series follows an estranged family reuniting after the mother's death. Archika Khurana of The Times of India called it "a well-told story of a dysfunctional family", while noting its slow pace.

That year, Danish also directed "She Loves Me, She Loves Me Not", an episode of the Netflix anthology Feels Like Ishq, starring Saba Azad and Sanjeeta Bhattacharya. Pratikshya Mishra of The Quint praised its treatment of the innocence and complications of a queer romance. Praveen Sudevan of The Hindu named it among the anthology's "stand-outs".

=== Music videos ===
Danish directed the music video for the song "Baadshah" (2017), performed by Pratyul Joshi and released by T-Series. The video was shot in Mauritius and features actress Pallavi Sharda alongside Joshi.

Danish also directed the music video for "Jiya Laage Na" (2024), a romantic single sung by Mohit Chauhan and Shilpa Rao, with music by Rochak Kohli, released by Universal Music India Pvt. Ltd. under their VYRL Originals label. The video features Parth Samthaan and Isha Malviya in a story of a newly married couple finding love in a joint family setting.

=== Return to feature films ===
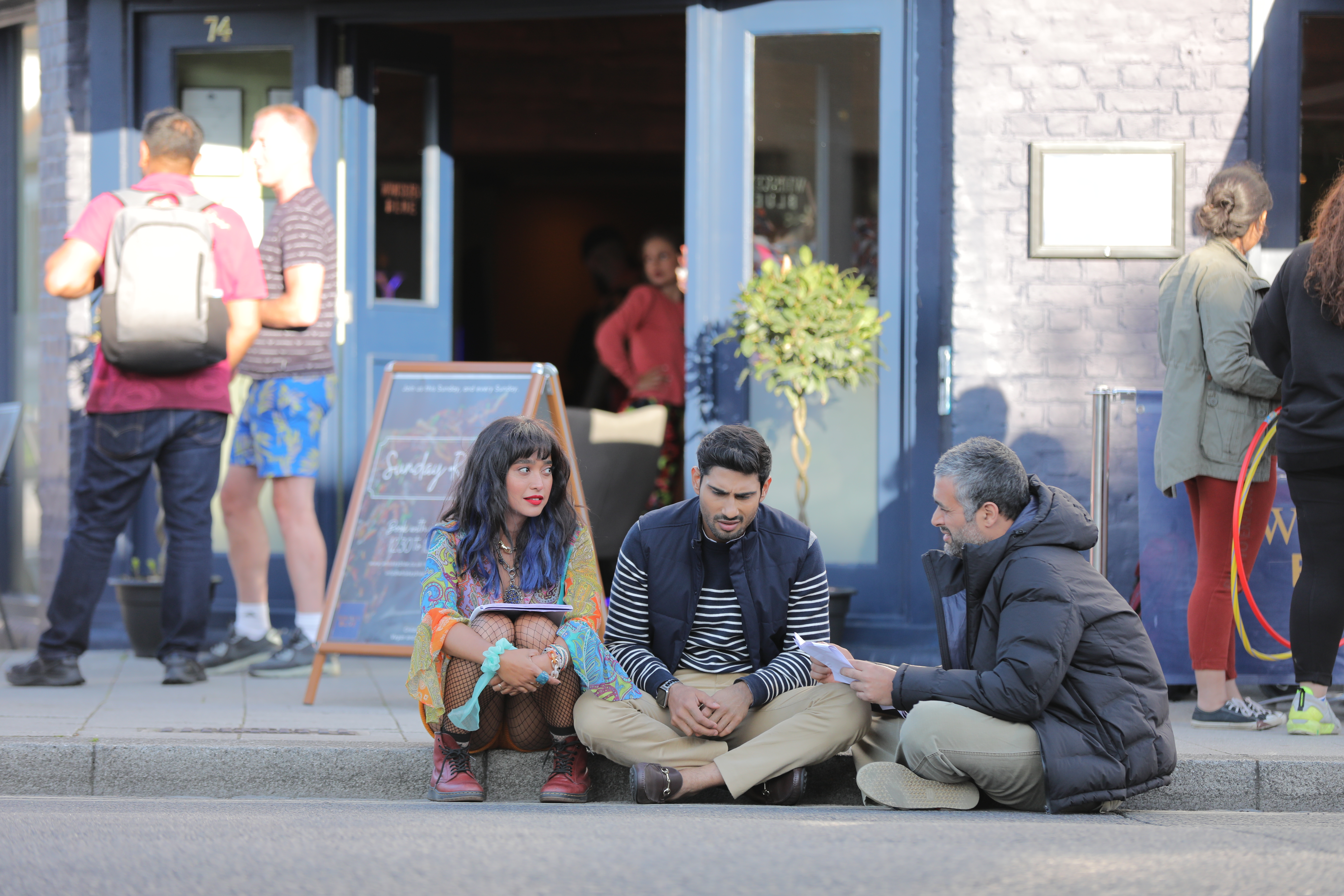
Danish with Prateik Babbar and Sayani Gupta during the filming of Khwaabon Ka Jhamela in Southampton.

Danish returned to feature films with Khwaabon Ka Jhamela, starring Prateik Babbar, Sayani Gupta and Kubbra Sait, released on JioCinema on 8 November 2024. Adapted from the Canadian film My Awkward Sexual Adventure, it was developed by producers Harman Baweja and Vicky Bahri. Danish worked on the screenplay with Arpita Chatterjee and wrote the dialogue. Troy Ribeiro of the Free Press Journal praised its visuals and performances, while finding that its whimsy sometimes outweighed its substance. Times Now also praised the performances. Archika Khurana of The Times of India found it engaging and praised its cast and visual appeal, while criticising its predictability and limited emotional depth.

Danish subsequently directed and co-produced Adhure Hum Adhure Tum, reuniting with Imran Khan, alongside Bhumi Pednekar and Gurfateh Pirzada. Principal photography took place in 2025, with additional filming in May 2026. In August 2026, Khan said that the film was in post-production and expected to be released on Netflix by the end of 2026.

== Themes ==
Relationships and changing social expectations recur in Aslam's work. Discussing the second season of It's Not That Simple, he said the series expanded beyond its central marriage to examine father–daughter relationships, young-adult couples, bisexual and lesbian characters, the MeToo movement and consent. His episode of Feels Like Ishq, centred on a queer romance, was described by The Hindu as one of the anthology's "stand-outs" and by The Quint as retaining "the innocence of a love story" while addressing the complications of an LGBTQ relationship.

== Filmography ==
=== Films ===
Year	Film	Role
2010	Break Ke Baad	Director, story development
2024	Khwaabon Ka Jhamela	Director, co-screenwriter, dialogue writer
TBA	Adhure Hum Adhure Tum	Director, co-producer; Post-prduction

=== Television and web series ===
Year	Title	Role
2013–2014	Yeh Hai Aashiqui	Director
2014	Love By Chance	Director
2014–2015	Siyaasat	Director
2015	Kabhi Aise Geet Gaya Karo	Director
2016, 2018	It's Not That Simple	Director, writer
2017	Time Out	Director, writer
2020	Flesh	Director, dialogue writer
2021	The Reunion – Chal Chalein Apne Ghar	Director, writer
2021	Feels Like Ishq	Director, writer

=== Music videos ===
Year	Song title	Artist	Production company
2017	Baadshah	Pratyul Joshi	T-Series
2024	Jiya Laage Na	Mohit Chauhan & Shilpa Rao	Universal Music India

=== Acting ===
Year	Project	Role	Notes
2023	Kaala	IB officer Himanshu Desai	
2008	Thoda Pyaar Thoda Magic	Young Ranbir's Teacher	Minor role
2007	Exitz	Ravina's brother	Minor role
2005	Salaam Namaste	Shopkeeper	Minor role

=== Assistant director ===
Year	Film
2004	Lakshya
2004	Swades
2005	Salaam Namaste
2006	Being Cyrus
2006	Fanaa
2007	Ta Ra Rum Pum
2008	Thoda Pyaar Thoda Magic
