= My Friend Pinto (soundtrack) =

Soundtrack album by Ajay–Atul, Shamir Tandon, Kavita Seth and Hitesh Sonik
- Released: 23 September 2011
- Recorded: 2011
- Genre: Feature film soundtrack
- Length: 14:19
- Language: Hindi; English
- Label: UTV; Sony Music; Saregama
- Producer: Ajay–Atul

My Friend Pinto is the soundtrack album to the 2011 film of the same name directed by Raaghav Dar and produced by Sanjay Leela Bhansali and UTV Motion Pictures, starring Prateik Babbar and Kalki Koechlin. The soundtrack featured six songs composed by the duo Ajay and Atul Gogavale, along with Shamir Tandon, Kavita Seth and Hitesh Sonik as guest composers. Amitabh Bhattacharya, Charan Jeet and Deepa Sheshadari wrote the lyrics for the songs. The soundtrack was released on 23 September 2011.

== Background ==
The film's music was composed by the duo of Ajay and Atul Gogavale. It was the duo's third Hindi project after Gayab (2004) and Viruddh (2005). Their unsuccessful stint in Hindi cinema and booming popularity in Marathi cinema, led to focusing towards the latter, where they received critical acclaim for their works. When Bhansali listened to their compositions for Jogwa (2009), which fetched them National Film Award for Best Music Direction, and impressed by it, Bhansali signed them to compose music for My Friend Pinto. It was actually the duo's first Hindi project they signed since 2005, but as Singham released first, My Friend Pinto became the duo's second to be released.

The duo recalled on following Bhansali's works, and his appreciation, prompted them to compose music for the film. Unlike their works in Marathi films, it was completely much different, where the vibe is totally Western and Bohemian, and influences of Spanish music. The duo extensively worked on jazz music to match the modern feel.

Amitabh Bhattacharya served as the primary lyricist, with the exception of the song "Intezaar" which featured both English and Hindi lyrics written by Charan Jeet and Deepa Sheshadari. Kunal Ganjawala, Gayatri Ganjawala, K.K., Sunidhi Chauhan, and the Nirmatee group variously served as vocalists for the tracks in the album. Hitesh Sonik who composed the background score, and Shamir Tandon and Kavita Seth guest composed one song each: "Tu" and "Intezaar".

== Release ==
The album was released on 23 September 2011 through UTV Music. Sony Music India acquired the licensing rights from UTV for the digital distribution, while Saregama handled the distribution for the physical copies in the market. The digital version excluded "Yaadon Ki Album", "Tu" and "Intezaar", having only three songs.

== Reception ==
Joginder Tuteja from Bollywood Hungama gave a mixed review, calling it as a "barely passable album". While he was appreciative of the tracks "Tu" and "Intezaar", Tuteja dismissed the other tracks, calling them "situational" and "barely average". Karthik Srinivasan of Milliblog criticized it as the "middling fourth Hindi outing by Ajay-Atul". Abid of Yahoo News wrote "Too much of a good thing is not good, so the album tends to get repetitive after a while." Jhunki Sen of News18, described the songs as "great", while Sanjukta Sharma of Mint criticized it as "ordinary".

== Track listing ==
| No. | Title | Lyrics | Music | Singer(s) | Length |
|---|---|---|---|---|---|
| 1. | "Take It Easy" | Amitabh Bhattacharya | Ajay–Atul | Kunal Ganjawala, Gayatri Ganjawala | 3:59 |
| 2. | "Yaadon Ki Album" | Amitabh Bhattacharya | Ajay–Atul | K.K. | 3:39 |
| 3. | "Intezaar" | Charan Jeet, Deepa Sheshadari | Shamir Tandon, Kavita Seth | Nirmatee | 2:56 |
| 4. | "Do Kabootar" | Amitabh Bhattacharya | Ajay–Atul | Kunal Ganjawala | 3:21 |
| 5. | "Tu" | Amitabh Bhattacharya | Hitesh Sonik | Sunidhi Chauhan | 3:19 |
| 6. | "Dhinchak Zindagi" | Amitabh Bhattacharya | Ajay–Atul | Kunal Ganjawala | 5:53 |
| Total length: | | | | | 14:19 |
