= Rohan Mehra =

Rohan Mehra may refer to:

- Rohan Mehra (born 1990), Indian actor
- Rohan Mehra (born 1991), Indian actor
