= Gurgaon (disambiguation) =

Gurgaon (now Gurugram) is a city in Haryana, India.

Gurgaon or Gurugram may also refer to:

== Places and divisions ==
- Gurgaon district, district in Haryana, India with Gurgaon as its capital
- Gurgaon Division, a division of Haryana, India
- Gurgaon (Lok Sabha constituency), Indian parliamentary constituency

== Art and entertainment ==
- Gurgaon (film), a 2017 Indian film

== See also ==
- Girgaon, Mumbai, India
- Goregaon, Mumbai, India
