= Khwaabon Ka Jhamela =

- Official release poster
- Directed by: Danish Aslam
- Written by: Danish Aslam; Arpita Chatterjee; Harman Baweja; Vicky Bahri
- Produced by: Jyoti Deshpande; Pammi Baweja; Harman Baweja; Vicky Bahri
- Starring: Prateik Babbar; Sayani Gupta; Kubbra Sait
- Cinematography: Anshuman Mahaley
- Edited by: Abhishek Seth
- Music by: Siddharth Basrur; Surya Ragunaathan; Chandan Raina; Subhi Khanna; Ed Geater
- Production companies: Jio Studios; Baweja Studios
- Distributed by: JioCinema
- Release date: 8 November 2024
- Running time: 113 minutes
- Country: India
- Language: Hindi

Khwaabon Ka Jhamela (transl. The Trouble Of Dreams) is a 2024 Indian Hindi-language romantic comedy film directed and written by Danish Aslam. Produced under the banner of Jio Studios and Baweja Studios, the film stars Prateik Babbar, Sayani Gupta and Kubbra Sait. It was released on JioCinema on 8 November 2024.

== Cast ==
- Prateik Babbar as Zubin Readymoney
- Sayani Gupta as Rubaiyat "Ruby"
- Kubbra Sait as Shehnaaz
- Lillete Dubey as Zubin's mother
- Kaizaad Kotwal as Zubin's father
- Danish Husain as Ruby's father
- Freddie Love as Quinn, Ruby's friend

== Plot ==
Zubin Readymoney, a young Parsi man, is rejected by his fiancée Shehnaz due to his lack of spontaneity and bedroom skills. Frustrated, he embarks on a solo trip to London that was originally planned for both of them. There, he meets Ruby, a film intimacy coordinator who gives him an unexpected crash course in spontaneity and seduction. In return, Zubin helps Ruby organize her chaotic finances. Together, they embark on a journey of self-discovery, blending fondness with mutual self-improvement

== Development ==
The film was produced by Harman Baweja and Vicky Bahri. Danish Aslam, who previously directed Break Ke Baad (2010), came on board after being offered the initial story, which was an Indian adaptation of the 2012 Canadian film My Awkward Sexual Adventure, directed by Sean Garrity. Danish made significant changes to the script, including removing some characters and altering the ending.

== Production ==
The film was announced by Jio Studios with Prateik Babbar and Sayani Gupta cast in lead roles.

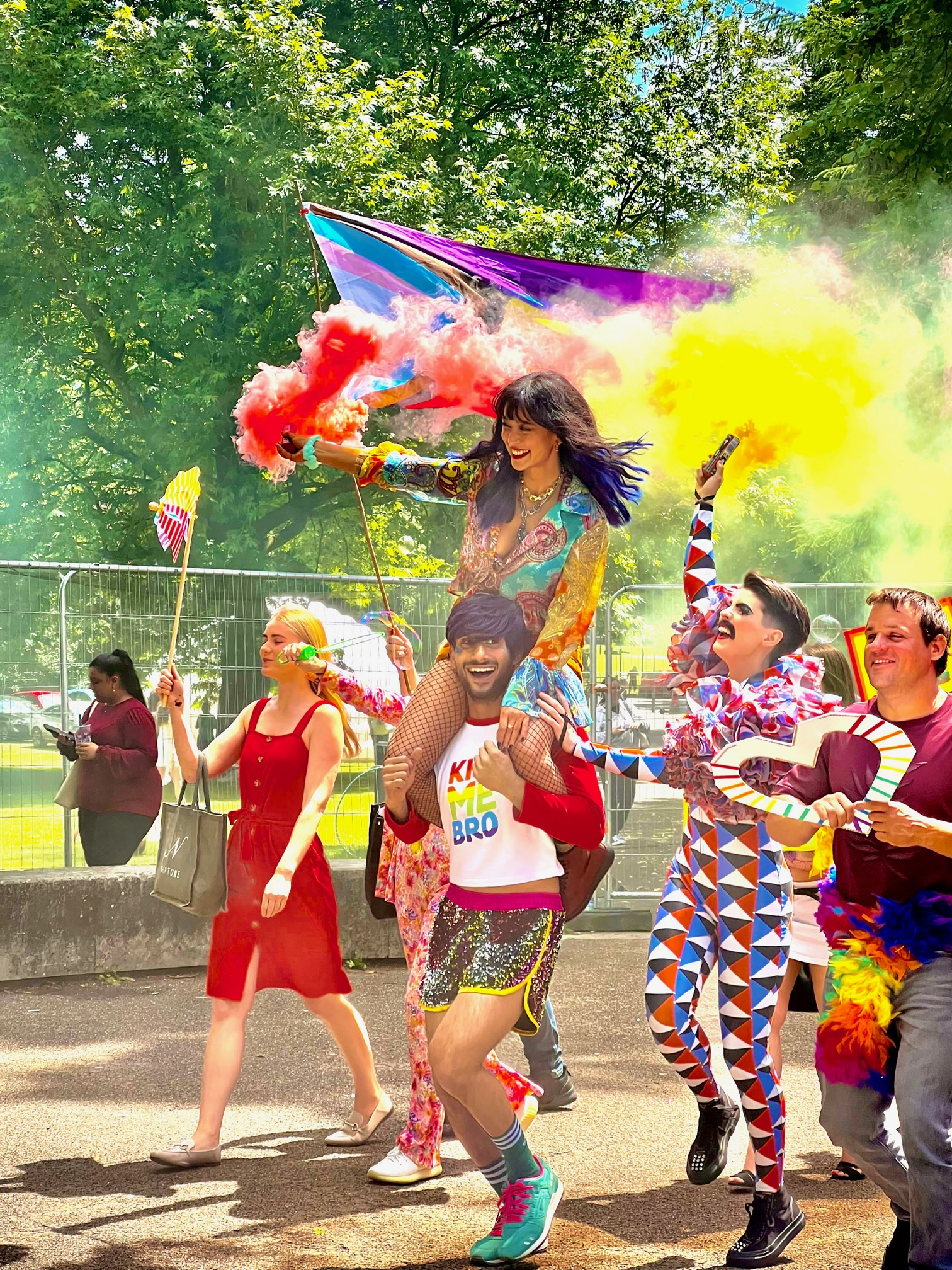
Prateik Babbar & Sayani Gupta during the shoot of the title song, which was shot during the Southampton Pride march in Southampton, UK in June 2022

The film was shot largely in the UK, in various locations ranging from London to Eastbourne. The title song was shot at Southampton Pride, with the actors joining the pride march. This was shot using multiple iPhones of various crew members (apart from the film camera) for maximum coverage since retakes were not going to be possible.

There was also one schedule in Mumbai, which included a set of Ruby's London apartment.

Kubbra Sait almost had to be recast due to an arm injury just before shooting began. Her scenes were filmed with her arm in limited positions to accommodate the injury. Throughout the movie, her left arm remains mostly static due to this injury.

The final title "Khwaabon Ka Jhamela" was inspired by a line from one of the film's songs, written by lyricists Chandan Raina and Surya Raghunaathan.

The filming was wrapped in July 2022. The trailer of the film was released on 30 October 2024.

== Music ==
Khwaabon Ka Jhamela

Soundtrack album
- Released: 4 November 2024
- Genre: Feature film soundtrack
- Length: 7:03
- Language: Hindi
- Label: Jio Studios

Track listing
No.	Title	Lyrics	Music	Singer(s)	Length
1.	"Khwaabon Ka Jhamela Title Track"	Surya Ragunaathan, Chandan Raina	Siddharth Basrur, Surya Ragunaathan, Chandan Raina	Siddharth Basrur, Surya Ragunaathan	04:28
2.	"Jee Le Tu"	Subhi Khanna	Subhi Khanna, Ed Geater	Shahzan Mujeeb	02:35
Total length:					07:03

== Reception ==
Khwaabon Ka Jhamela received generally positive reviews from critics, who praised its visual appeal, performances and its refreshing take on modern relationships.

The Times of India awarded the film 3 out of 5 stars, describing it as a "feel-good slice-of-life" movie that "forces you to think within, find happiness in your own self, and embrace your singlehood". The Free Press Journal highlighted the film's visual appeal and called it "lighthearted, visually stunning, and filled with likable performances". Times Now praised the movie's "remarkable cinematography, bright canvas, relatable jokes and lovely performances," calling it a "perfect weekend watch".
