= Teen Paheliyan =

2020 Indian Hindi-language anthology thriller film

- Directed by: Pratim D. Gupta; Arindam Sil; Sujoy Ghosh
- Written by: Pratim D. Gupta; Sujoy Ghosh
- Starring: See Cast
- Distributed by: Star Plus
- Release date: 22 April 2018
- Country: India
- Language: Hindi

Teen Paheliyan (transl. three riddles) is a 2018 Indian thriller/sci-fi anthology created by National award-winning filmmaker Sujoy Ghosh that aired on Star Plus on 22 April 2018. The anthology comprises three short stories titled Mirchi Malini, Copy, and Good Luck, starring Vikrant Massey, Surveen Chawla, Kunaal Roy Kapur, Tina Desai, Paoli Dam, Akshay Oberoi, Shraddha Das, and Rukhsar Rehman.

== Plot ==
Teen Paheliyan is a collection of three independently shot films having elements of suspense, excitement, anticipation, and thrill.

=== Good Luck ===
Written and directed by Sujoy Ghosh, Good Luck revolves around Jenny Saxena (played by Tina) who runs a cafe. She bumps into Peter Palekar (Kunal), a salesperson who sells Good Luck.

=== Copy ===
Helmed by Arindam Sil, Copy narrates the story of a young boy named Sid who hires a robot which is a replica of himself. But things soon begin to go wrong when the robot starts controlling his life. The story is about a conflicted mind that is striving to find a ground on who he wants to be and what the society wants him to be.

=== Mirchi Malini ===
Malini played by Paoli Dam, is a Gastrologer. She can tell a person's deepest darkest secret by tasting a spoon of their handmade dish.

== List of short films ==
Short films	Genre	Director	Writer(s)	Actors
Mirchi Malini	Thriller	Pratim D. Gupta	Pratim D. Gupta	Paoli Dam, Shraddha Das, Tara Alisha Berry, Akshay Oberoi
Copy	Sci-fi	Arindam Sil		Vikrant Massey, Surveen Chawla
Good Luck	Thriller	Sujoy Ghosh	Sujoy Ghosh	Kunaal Roy Kapur, Tina Desai, Darshan Jariwala

== Cast ==
Mirchi Malini

- Paoli Dam as Mirchi Malini
- Shraddha Das as Damini
- Tara Alisha Berry as Kusum
- Neha Chauhan as Monika
- Akshay Oberoi as Arjun
- Rukhsar Rehman as Rita Malik

Copy

- Vikrant Massey as Siddharth
- Surveen Chawla as Mamta
- Anupriya Goenka as Simona

Good Luck

- Tina Desai as Jenny Saxena
- Kunaal Roy Kapur as Peter Palekar
- Darshan Jariwala as Ritchie Selva
- Amrita Bagchi as Ava
