= Kaala (TV series) =

Indian Crime thriller television series

- Genre: Crime thriller
- Created by: Bejoy Nambiar
- Directed by: Bejoy Nambiar
- Starring: Avinash Tiwary; Rohan Vinod Mehra; Nivetha Pethuraj; Taher Shabbir; Hiten Tejwani
- Music by: Gaurav Godkhindi
- Country of origin: India
- Original language: Hindi
- No. of seasons: 1
- No. of episodes: 8

Production
- Producers: Bhushan Kumar; Krishan Kumar; Bejoy Nambiar
- Cinematography: Siddharth Srinivasan
- Editor: Priyank Prem Kumar
- Running time: 45 minutes
- Production company: T-Series Films

Original release
- Network: Disney+ Hotstar
- Release: 15 September 2023

Kaala is an Indian Hindi-language crime thriller television series created and directed by Bejoy Nambiar. Produced by Bhushan Kumar, Krishan Kumar and Bejoy Nambiar under the banner of T-Series Films, it deals with reverse hawala and stars Avinash Tiwary, Rohan Vinod Mehra, Nivetha Pethuraj, Taher Shabbir and Hiten Tejwani. It started streaming on 15 September 2023 on Disney+ Hotstar.

== Synopsis ==
The time is 2018 and there is a millionaire business tycoon ‘Naman Arya’ whose business is recycling but under its guise he carries out black business like Money Laundering and Hawala Works to convert black money into white money. IB Officer Ritwik Mukherjee is trying to stop those black businesses.

== Cast ==
- Avinash Tiwary as Kolkata IB officer Ritwik Mukherjee
- Rohan Vinod Mehra as Ex-Army officer Subhendu Mukherjee/Adinath Bagchi, Ritwik's father
- Jitin Gulati as Balwant Bir Rana/Shakti Arya, Naman's father/mother
- Nivetha Pethuraj as Kolkata IB officer Sitara "Tara", Ritwik's girlfriend
- Anil Charanjeett as Kolkata CBI officer Danish Khan
- Taher Shabbir as Naman Rana/Naman Arya
- Danish Aslam as Kolkata IB officer Himanshu Desai, Ritwik and Tara's superior officer
- Shruti Seth as Malini, Producer
- Hiten Tejwani as Bismil
- Darius Chinoy as Advocate Chinoy
- Salim Siddiqui as Chandraneil Gupta
- Mita Vashisht as Chief Minister Jyoti Sen alias "Didi"
- Sreelekha Mitra as Paromita Mukherjee, Ritwik's mother
- Saurabh Sachdeva as Colonel Himmat Singh Maan
- Elisha Mayor as Aaloka Bagchi, Subhendu's adopted daughter and Ritwik's step-sister
- Abhijit Sinha as CBI Director
- Siva Ananth as Delhi IB officer Mohan Sethuraman
- Shinjana Chakraborty as Reza, Shakti's aide
- Vinil Mathew as SJP, banker
- Alistar Bennis as Wilson, the assassin
- Shakti Kapoor in a special appearance as Ghulam
- Priyanka Bose in a special appearance as Vandana
- Ananddeep Dasgupta as Manas

== Production ==
In August 2023, the series was announced by T-Series Films for Disney+ Hotstar. Avinash Tiwary, Rohan Vinod Mehra, Nivetha Pethuraj, Taher Shabbir and Hiten Tejwani joined the cast. The principal photography of the series commenced in 2022. The launch event for the series was held on 31 August 2023.

== Reception ==
Ronak Kotecha of The Times of India rated 3 out of 5 star and wrote that " Despite its shortcomings, it consistently provides an engaging dose of excitement in a fictional narrative of power, politics, and the darker aspects of human desires, making it a watchable experience." Santanu Das of Hindustan Times stated that "unfortunately, emerges out of the many tendencies that takes place in Kaala in breakneck speed and style." The Hindu critic gave mixed reviews. NDTV critic rated 2 out of 5 and stated that "Kaala, all sound and fury, is a shot in the dark that misses the mark by a mile and a half."

== See also ==
- List of Disney+ Hotstar original programming
