= Shruti Seth =

Indian actress and video jockey (born 1977)

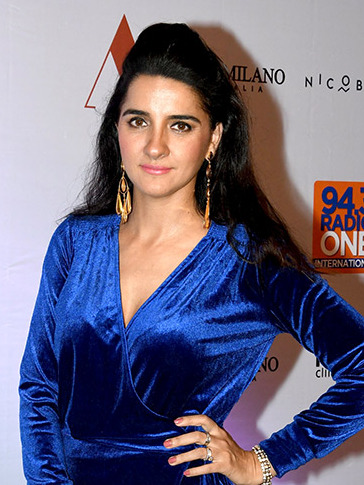
- Seth in 2018
- Born: Shruti S Seth; 1977 (age 48–49); Mumbai, Maharashtra, India
- Occupations: Actress, Model
- Years active: 2001–present
- Known for: The Suite Life of Karan & Kabir, Shararat (TV series)
- Spouse: Danish Aslam (m. 2010)
- Children: 1

Shruti Seth (born 1977) is an Indian actress and video jockey. Having begun her career as television show host, she gained wider recognition with her roles as comedian in several television shows and the Hindi film industry.

Born and brought up in Mumbai, Maharashtra, Seth graduated St. Xavier's College with a degree in economics. She ventured into a modelling career and began hosting television shows for Channel V. A significant turning point came in her career when she cast in the role of Jiya Malhotra, a teenage in Star Plus's comedy series Shararat (2003–06). The show's popularity grew over the years and Seth gained prominence for her performance.

Seth made her film debut in 2003 with Waisa Bhi Hota Hai Part II, and later earned praise for her supporting roles in top-grossing productions—Fanaa (2006) and Slumdog Millionaire (2008). Seth starred in Disney Channel's original series The Suite Life of Karan & Kabir and continued to host such television shows as the Comedy Circus series.

== Personal life ==
Seth attended Ashok Academy and graduated from St. Xavier's College, Mumbai with a degree in Economics and Commerce. She is married to film director Danish Aslam, and together they have a daughter named Alina. Seth is of Punjabi Hindu origin.

A controversy arose when Aslam commented on Twitter in critique of Indian Prime Minister Narendra Modi's #selfiewithdaughter campaign for women and girls, which he announced in his Mann Ki Baat radio address. After this she started to receive abuse through Twitter and social media. This resulted in members of the media and Bollywood defending her against the abuse.

== Career ==
=== Early roles and recognition with Shararat (2001-2006) ===
Seth started her career as a guest relation executive at the Taj Mahal Hotel, Bombay. She began modelling at the same time "to make some pocket money", and was soon offered guest roles in a few television shows. Seth then hosted such successful shows as First Day First Show and Junglee Jukebox on Channel V. She said, in a later interview, that it was her time as a video jockey and television presenter on the channel "that firmly put me on the map."

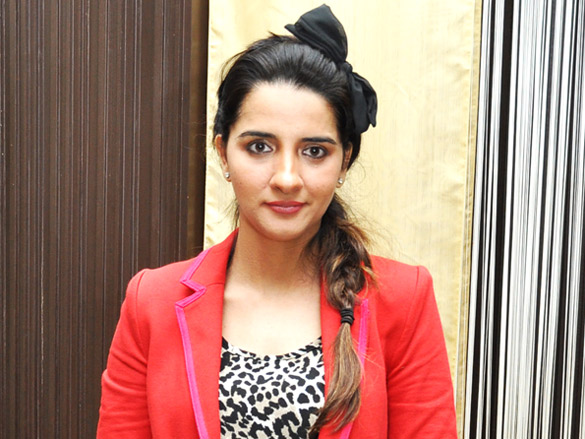
Seth in a promotional event in 2012.

Seth auditioned for a role in the Star Plus sitcom Shararat. Co-starring Farida Jalal and Eva Grover, the show followed the life of teenager who, on her eighteenth birthday, discovers she has magical powers. Seth was cast in the lead role as Kiya opposite Karanvir Bohra; her performance received positive response from critics and fans. The show was in itself a surprise success and ran for three years on the network.

Seth went on to star in other television show including Kyun Hota Hai Pyarrr, Des Mein Niklla Hoga Chand, and Rishta.com on Sony Entertainment Television. On Rishta.com, she said in an interview that, "They (the Yash Raj serials) haven't got any TRPs at all. But it's not for the people who are watching TV in the first place. The whole TRP game is very skewed. I don't believe that in a population of over a billion people, 15,000 households decide what the entire country wants to watch. This lot of Yash Raj was conceptualised for those who are not watching TV". She further said in the same interview that "All our loyal audience for my serial on TV is in London, America, South Africa, Australia. It's not that the Indians will not like it, it's just sad that they are not aware of it, because the publicity has been disappointing". She has also hosted several seasons of Comedy Circus on Sony Channel.

=== Film expansion (2007-2019) ===
Seth has starred in a few films. On moving from television to films, she stated that, "I haven't really moved on to anything. It's not that I would not do TV and only do films. Yes, more avenues have started opening for me. I am game for doing something exciting on any medium – stage, celluloid or TV".

Seth's first recognition in films came with her role of Fatima "Fatty" in Fanaa (2006) with Aamir Khan and Kajol. The film emerged as the sixth-highest grossing Hindi film of the year. She then starred in Tara Rum Pum, produced by Yash Raj Films and made an appearance in Prakash Jha's film Raajneeti in 2010. On her role in Rajneeti, she said in an interview that "I am hoping that my hard-hitting role in Rajneeti will change my being typecast, because it is the most unlikely character one would expect me to play".

Between 2012 to 2013, Seth earned praises for two television shows The Suite Life of Karan & Kabir and Baalveer; She first played a single mother to twins in The Suite Life of Karan & Kabir, and then played Rani Pari in Baalveer, replacing Karishma Tanna.

=== Streaming series and further work (2020-present) ===
Seth ventured into streaming series with the 2020 series The Forgotten Army – Azaadi Ke Liye, portraying Captain Lakshmi Swaminathan. She then appeared in such series as Mentalhood (2020), Bloody Brothers (2022), Kaala (2023), Dil Dosti Dilemma (2024), 36 days (2024) and Zindaginama (2024). The series Mentalhood revolved around different natures of mothers and showcases how they try their best to raise their children, where Seth played a prominent role. Reviewing 36 Days, where she was paired opposite Purab Kohli, Riya Sharma from DNA noted, "Purab Kohli and Shruti Seth impress with their performance as a couple with trust issues and problems."

== Filmography ==
Key
†	Denotes films that have not yet been released

=== Films ===
Year	Title	Role	Notes	Ref.
2003	Waisa Bhi Hota Hai Part II	Barista member	Special appearance	
2006	Fanaa	Fatima "Fatty" Ali		
2007	Ta Ra Rum Pum	Sasha		
2008	Slumdog Millionaire	Call Center Instructor		
2009	Anubhav	Antara		
2009	Aagey Se Right	Suhasi Mathur		
2010	Rajneeti	Party worker		
2011	My Friend Pinto	Suhani Sharma		
2019	Kadakh	Alka		
2026	Yeh Prem Mol Liya †	TBA		

=== Television ===
Year	Title	Role	Notes	Ref.
2001	Ssshhhh...Koi Hai	Anjali	Episode: "Khel Khel Mein"	
2001–2002	Maan	Khuswant "Khushi" Kaur Maan		
2002	Des Mein Niklla Hoga Chand			
2002–2004	Kyun Hota Hai Pyarrr	Ramya		
2003–2006	Shararat	Jiya Malhotra		
2003	Kuch Kar Dikhana Hai	Host		
2005	Mum Tum Aur Hum	Host		
2007–2008	Comedy Circus	Host		
2008	Dhak Dhak In Dubai	Sheetal Patel		
2008	Bollywood Club -- Kismat Ka Konnection	Host		
2009	Choo Lo Asmaan	Host		
2009	Mallika-E-Kitchen	Host		
2009	Comedy Circus 20 – 20	Host		
2010	Rishta.com	Isha Mirchandani		
2012	Kahani Comedy Circus Ki	Host		
2012–2013	The Suite Life of Karan & Kabir	Priti Jaiswal		
2013	Baalveer	Rani Pari		
2013	Comedy Circus Ke Ajoobe	Host		
2013–2014	Comedy Circus Ke Mahabali	Host		
2015	The Great Indian Family Drama	Various characters		
2015–2017	Comedy Nights Bachao	Herself		
2017	TV Biwi Aur Main	Priya Rajeev Gupta		
2019	Jestination Unknown	Herself		
2019	Apna News Ayega	Various characters		
2020	Dil Jaise Dhadke... Dhadakne Do	Bhavini Mishra		
2026–present	Queen	Akshara Singh Tomar		

=== Web series ===
Year	Title	Role	Notes	Ref.
2020	The Forgotten Army – Azaadi Ke Liye	Captain Lakshmi Swaminathan		
2020	Mentalhood	Diksha Shah		
2022	Bloody Brothers	Priya Grover		
2023	Kaala	Malini		
2024	Dil Dosti Dilemma	Arshiya Khalid		
2024	36 days	Radhika Jaykar		
2024	Zindaginama	Dr. Pavitra	Episode: "Purple Duniya"	
