= Adbhut =

- Official release poster
- Directed by: Sabbir Khan
- Written by: Sabbir Khan
- Produced by: Sabbir Khan
- Starring: Nawazuddin Siddiqui; Diana Penty; Shreya Dhanwanthary
- Cinematography: Binod Pradhan
- Edited by: Manan Sagar
- Music by: Julius Packiam
- Production companies: Sony Pictures International Productions; Sabbir Khan Films
- Distributed by: Sony Max
- Release date: 15 September 2024
- Running time: 120 minutes
- Country: India
- Language: Hindi

Adbhut is an 2024 Indian Hindi-language supernatural television horror film written and directed by Sabbir Khan. it stars Nawazuddin Siddiqui, Diana Penty and Shreya Dhanwanthary. The film was premiered directly on Sony Max on 15 September.

== Plot ==
The film starts with detective Gajraj Awasthy being honored by the Police department. In reply to a question regarding the most difficult case of his life, his memory takes him back by 5 years. He reminisces a case, which forms the story of the film. Dr. Aditya and Dr. Shruti Rawat come to stay in a house in hills. A mysterious force keeps disturbing the couple off and on once they move in. Gajraj is called in to investigate the mysterious happenings. His investigation leads him to Mary Mathews who is somehow linked to the disturbances that happens to Rawats.

It is then revealed that Dr. Aditya and Dr. Shruti Rawat killed a coma patient, Amy R Mathews and did a heart transplant to one Anjali Malhotra. The spirit of Amy goes into Anjali who becomes Mary Mathews. The Rawats confess their crime and go to jail while Amy's spirit is freed.

== Cast ==
- Nawazuddin Siddiqui as Detective Gajraj Awasthy
- Diana Penty as Mary Matthews / Anjali Malhotra
- Himanshi Parashar as Amy R. Matthews
- Shreya Dhanwanthary as Dr. Shruti Rawat
- Rohan Mehra as Dr. Aditya Rawat
- Pradeep Kumar as Engineer Pradeep Kumar
- Vikram Gokhale as Khan, Gajraj's repulsive colleague
- Sohila Kapur as Mrs. Mathews, Amy's mother
- Sanjay Gurbaxani as Priest
- Shashank Shende as Ramakant Yadav

== Production ==
The film was announced in October 2021. Nawazuddin Siddiqui, Diana Penty, Shreya Dhanwanthary and Rohan Mehra joined the cast. Principal photography commenced by October 2021. The film was mainly shot in Shimla before wrapping in May 2022.

== Release ==
The film premiered on Sony Max on 15 September 2024.

== Reception ==
Bollywood Hungama gave 2.5/5, saying "Sabbir Khan's story is decent though it gets clichéd at places", and "The scene where the fan comes flying towards Aditya and Shruti is terrifying. One might guess that the film will take a certain path. But it doesn’t and that makes the suspense unpredictable." Performances of all actors is praised.
