= Ek Kori Prem Katha =

- Theatrical release poster
- Directed by: Chinmay Purohit
- Written by: Saba Mumtaz
- Starring: Akshay Oberoi; Khanak Budhiraja; Raj Babbar; Poonam Dhillon; Darshan Jariwala
- Cinematography: Ricky MK; Pratap Rout
- Edited by: Aseem Sinha
- Music by: Vicky Prasad
- Production companies: Kenilworth Film Productions; Sughand Films
- Release date: 5 April 2024
- Country: India
- Language: Hindi

Ek Kori Prem Katha is a 2024 Indian Hindi-language drama film directed by Chinmay Purohit and written by Saba Mumtaz. Produced under Kenilworth Film Productions and Sughand Films, it stars Akshay Oberoi, Khanak Budhiraja, Raj Babbar, Poonam Dhillon and Darshan Jariwala. The film was theatrically released in India on 5 April 2024.

== Cast ==
- Akshay Oberoi as Laddu Singh
- Khanak Budhiraja as Sabhyata
- Raj Babbar as Thakur Ram Dev Singh
- Poonam Dhillon as Kanak Devi
- Darshan Jariwala as Naan Babu Singh, Sabhyata's father
- Ketki Dave as Laxmi Singh, Sabhyata's mother
- Mukesh Bhatt as Jhinku Singh

== Production ==
Principal photography commenced by May 2022. The film was mainly shot in Balrampur before wrapping in 2022.

== Music ==
Ek Kori Prem Katha

Soundtrack album by Vickey Prasad
- Released: April 1, 2024
- Genre: Feature film soundtrack
- Length: 9:51
- Language: Hindi
- Label: Zee Music Company

Official audio
- Ek Kori Prem Katha - Full Album on YouTube

The film has following tracks:

Track listing
No.	Title	Singer(s)	Length
1.	"Chand Ki Thali"	Vickey Prasad	3:16
2.	"Aigiri Nandini"	Vinay Kapadia	4:18
3.	"Kaccha Matka"	Suvarna Tiwari, Vickey Prasad	2:17
Total length:			9:51

== Release ==
The film was premiered on JioCinema from 25 July 2024.

== Reception ==
Dhaval Roy of The Times of India rated 3/5 stars. A critic from Times Now gave the film three out of five stars.
