= Flesh (TV series) =

Indian crime thriller web series

- Genre: Fiction; Crime thriller
- Written by: Pooja Ladha Sruti
- Story by: Siddharth Anand; Sagar Pandya
- Directed by: Danish Aslam
- Presented by: Eros Now
- Starring: Swara Bhaskar; Akshay Oberoi; Mahima Makwana; Vidya Malvade
- Music by: Manas Chaturvedi; Shikhar Chaturvedi
- Country of origin: India
- Original language: Hindi
- No. of seasons: 1
- No. of episodes: 8

Production
- Producers: Siddharth Anand; Mamta Anand; Ridhima Lulla
- Camera setup: Multi-camera
- Running time: 42 minutes
- Production company: MARFLIX Indie

Original release
- Network: Eros Now
- Release: 21 August 2020

Flesh is a 2020 Indian crime thriller web series written by Pooja Ladha Surti and directed by Danish Aslam. The story of this series is based on human trafficking and stars Swara Bhaskar in the lead role.

== Plot summary ==
The storyfollows ACP Radha Nautiyal, a tough and unorthodox cop, as she investigates the disappearance of a teenage girl, Zoya, which leads her into the horrifying underworld of human trafficking. As Radha unravels a deeply rooted and violent sex trafficking network operating between Mumbai and Kolkata, she encounters psychopathic criminals, systemic corruption, and the brutal exploitation of countless girls and children. The series also follows a parallel story of two abducted siblings, highlighting the widespread and inhumane nature of the trade. With raw storytelling, intense performances, and unflinching visuals, Flesh exposes the dark realities of trafficking while questioning privilege, justice, and the human cost of indifference.

== Cast ==
- Swara Bhaskar as ACP Radha Nautiyal
- Mahima Makwana as Zoya, a 16-year-old NRI teenage girl and daughter of Reba and Shekhar who goes missing.
- Akshay Oberoi as Taj, King-pin of human trafficking.
- Vidya Malvade as Reba Gupta, Zoya's mother
- Yudhishtir Urs as Shekhar Gupta, Zoya's father.
- Siddhant Behl as Naman, Assistant of ACP Radha and also a member of Anti-trafficking.
- Bijou Thaangjam as Bali, the care taker and Dog trainer of Taj
- Moinak Dutta
- Shashie Vermaa as ACP Bond
- Nataša Stanković as Paul Madam (NIA Agent)
- Rahoul Dutta as Simon
- Auroshikha Dey as Manda

== Production ==
The first motion poster featuring Mahima Makwana, Swara Bhaskar and Akshay Oberoi was launched on 10 August 2020 by Eros Now social handle. On 11 August 2020, the trailer of the show was released.

== Critical reception ==
Flesh received generally positive reviews from critics. Shubhra Gupta, one of the authors of The Indian Express, writes, "Flesh smartly manages to maintain that very tough balance, between showing us repulsive, depraved people doing repulsive, depraved things, and keeping us watching, despite ourselves." Saibal Chatterjee of NDTV particularly praised the performance of the lead actors, Swara Bhaskar and Akshay Oberoi.
