= G Kutta Se =

- Directed by: Rahul Dahiya
- Story by: Rahul Dahiya
- Produced by: Vinod Sharma
- Starring: Rajveer Ankur Singh; Neha Chauhan; Rashmi Singh Somvanshi; Vibha Tyagi; Nitin Pandit
- Cinematography: Sachin Kabir
- Edited by: Pranay Nillay; Sandeep Singh Bejeli
- Music by: Original Songs; Anjo John; Original Score; Peter Broderick; Rutger Zuydervelt
- Production companies: SFE International; Full Frame Entertainment Pvt. Ltd.
- Distributed by: Shiladitya Bora
- Release dates: 4 October 2015 (Chicago South Asian Film Festival); 16 June 2017 (India)
- Running time: 104 minutes
- Country: India
- Language: Hindi
- Box office: ₹90 lakh

G Kutta Se (transl. G, a wanton heart) is a 2015 Indian drama film made in Haryanvi and Hindi language. The film stars Rajveer Singh, Neha Chauhan, Rashmi Singh Somvanshi, and Nitin Pandit in leading roles. The film is based on a true story.

The film was scheduled for release in India in 2016 but, due to censorship, was delayed until June 16, 2017. G Kutta Se, which has been written and directed by Rahul Dahiya, takes place in Haryana, a state in northern India, and portrays gender roles in the region and the woes of women in a misogynistic society.

== Plot ==
G Kutta Se is the story of people who follow the desires of their hearts and the consequences that befall them for doing so.

== Cast ==
- Rajveer Ankur Singh as Vijender
- Neha Chauhan as Kiran
- Nitin Pandit as Dheer
- Rashmi Singh Somvanshi as Preeti
- Vibha Tyagi as Diksha
- Sandeep Goyat as Keku
- Parth Sharma as Sikander

== Production ==
=== Development ===
According to director Rahul Dahiya the genesis of this film traces back to 2012 when he learned of an honour killing in his mother's village Ikkas in Haryana where a young girl was electrocuted by her family members for being in love with someone.

The dead girl sitting up in a bullock cart, while her family members pretended everything is normal, was disturbing. I wished to be a filmmaker and wondered what can be more important than talking about this.

— Rahul Dahiya on the incident that sparked the idea of making this film.

The director believes that there is a lot of hypocrisy surrounding the concepts of love, desire and honour and through his film he wanted to bring it out in the open and show everyone that it is impossible for anyone to curb their natural instincts. The director says that, "My movie is more about parents and other members of a family taking the drastic step of killing a girl for falling in love. It was more important for me to show that there is no button to switch off their attraction towards the opposite sex."

=== Casting ===
Most of the cast members in G Kutta Se are non actors and were selected after several rounds of auditions held in Delhi, Chandigarh and Haryana. The director Rahul Dahiya says that after the selection process was over, "For more than a month, the cast rehearsed together in Delhi — trying to get the accent and nuances right".

== Release ==
G Kutta Se had its world premiere at the Chicago South Asian Film Festival (CSAFF) on 4 October 2015. G – A Wanton Heart was also screened at the 16th Annual New York Indian Film Festival on 12 May 2016. The release of G Kutta Se got delayed in India as the Central Board of Film Certification refused to certify the movie on the grounds that the language and visuals of the film were unsuitable for the viewers. After refusal by CBFC, the makers of the film approached Film Certification Appellate Tribunal who decided to give the movie an A certificate but also asked for a few changes to be made in the movie. Finally the movie got released on 16 June 2017 on 40 screens all over India.

== Controversy ==
After the trailer for the film was launched on YouTube on 17 May 2017, several videos and messages were posted on social media issuing threats to harm the people associated with the film. The reason for this hostility was the way girls from Haryana had been portrayed in the movie and a dialogue that was later removed from the film.

== Soundtrack ==
G Kunna Se

Soundtrack album by Anjo John
- Released: 13 June 2017
- Recorded: 2016–2017
- Genre: Feature film soundtrack
- Length: 7:34
- Languages: Hindi, Haryanvi
- Label: Times Music

Singles from G Kutta Se
- 1. "Raagani"

The soundtrack of G Kutta Se consists of two songs composed by Anjo John the lyrics of which were written by Rahul Dahiya and Danish Raza.

Tracklist
No.	Title	Lyrics	Singer(s)	Length
1.	"G Kutta Se"	Rahul Dahiya, Danish Raza	Akshay Gupta	03:11
2.	"Chillum Haath Mein"	Rahul Dahiya	Vikas Pashoria	04:23
Total length:				7:34

== Critical reception ==
Reza Noorani of The Times of India gave the film a rating of 3 out of 5 and said that, "The film does have the potential to overwhelm you, given its heavy subject matter. Still, the filmmaker keeps you engrossed by using humour, which is dark and bleak just like the setting of the film." Shubhra Gupta of The Indian Express gave the film a rating of 3 out of 5 and said that, "Dahiya’s gut-wrenching debut, with its cast of non-professional actors, has an urgent docu-feature feel. It is powerful because it shows rather than tells." Rahul Desai of Film Companion gave the film a rating of 3.5 out of 5 and said that the movie is a "kind of unrelenting, yet disturbingly clinical kick to the guts. We don’t just double over, but awkwardly keel over in slow motion." Namrata Joshi of The Hindu complimented the movie by saying that, "G Kutta Se is one of the most relentlessly horrifying films one has seen of late—from the first frame to the last—primarily because it presents the patriarchal reality of Haryana in an absolutely stark, straightforward and unadorned way."

Suparna Sharma of Deccan Chronicle gave the film a rating of 3.5 out of 5 and said that, "Debutant writer-director Rahul Dahiya’s G Kutta Se is a brutal film that is focused on making us culpable voyeurs to crimes we read about with stunning regularity and yet pretend these are tales from another time, another dimension." The critic also praised the acting performances of all actors saying that, "The acting in G Kutta Se could not have been more organic, real. Each and everyone is superb." Uday Bhatia of Live Mint reviewed the film saying that, "this is a sharp, pitiless look at a society governed by feudal minds overly concerned with women’s honour while utterly dismissive of their rights." Filmfare praised the film saying that, "This film is brilliantly crafted and it tells a visceral and disturbing story. It's definitely one of the most intense and relevant films of the year." and gave the film a rating of 4 out of 5.

Anna MM Vetticad of First Post gave the film a rating of 4 out of 5 and said that, "Far from downplaying the seriousness of the subject at hand, Dahiya’s matter-of-fact storytelling style and Sachin Kabir’s unobtrusive cinematography have the effect of further underlining the blazing intensity of their theme, so that every new development comes as a punch in the gut." The critic also praised the acting performances in the film specially Rajveer Singh and Neha Chauhan saying that, "Both deliver flawless performances". Letty Mariam Abraham of Mid-Day gave the film a rating of 3.5 out of 5 and said that, "The film rings alarm bells about the rise in honour killings, while leaving you unsettled. A must watch film, where the script more than makes up for the lack of stars." Business Standard gave the film a rating of 4.5 out of 5 and said that, "G Kutta S takes an unflinching, long and hard look at tradition-sanctioned violence against women making it one of the darkest films in living memory. Dahiya succeeds in making every episode seem so real and palpable, you will get the feeling of being there, though you would often wish you weren't."

== Awards and nominations ==
Award	Date of Ceremony	Category	Recipient(s) and nominee(s)	Result	Ref.
Filmfare Awards	20 January 2018	Best Original Story	Rahul Dahiya	Nominated	
Filmfare Awards	20 January 2018	Best Debutant Director	Rahul Dahiya	Nominated	

== See also ==
- List of Bollywood films of 2015
