= Jalebi Rocks =

2025 film directed by Cchinmay P Purohit

- Official Poster
- Directed by: Cchinmay P Purohit
- Written by: Cchinmay P Purohit
- Produced by: Cchinmay P Purohi; Alex Bhagat; Ramesh Bhagat; Nirmal Patel; Binita Dharmesh Shah; Apoorva Shah; Nonita Shah
- Starring: Vandana Pathak; Nimesh Diliprai; Manav Gohil; Gaurav Paswala; Manasi Rachh
- Cinematography: Shakil B. Khan
- Edited by: Jitendra Shah
- Music by: Vinay Kapadia
- Production companies: Goosebumps Studios; Aasman Productions; ANB Entertainers
- Distributed by: Rupam Entertainment Pvt. Ltd
- Release date: 27 June 2025
- Running time: 137 minutes
- Country: India
- Language: Gujarati

Jalebi Rocks is a 2025 Gujarati family drama, written and directed by Cchinmay P Purohit. Starring Vandana Pathak, Nilesh Diliprai, Manav Gohil, Gaurav Paswala and Manasi Rachh and others.

== Plot ==
Vidya Pathak, a 48-year-old housewife, strives to overcome multiple challenges while balancing her family life and personal ambitions.

== Cast ==
- Vandana Pathak as Vidya Pathak
- Nimesh Diliprai as Anirudh Pathak
- Manav Gohil as Lawyer Rohit Mehta
- Deepak Gheewala as Mr. Shukla (Vidya’s Father)
- Gaurav Paswala as Jimmy
- Manasi Rachh as Munni
- Bhavini Jani as Mrs. Shukla (Vidya’s Mother)
- Morli Patel as Radha Kaki
- Harsh Usdadiya as Nikhil Pathak (Vidya’s Son)
- Jiya Bhatt as Juhi Pathak (Vidya’s Daughter)
- Kaushambi Bhatt as Neelu
- Bansi Rajput as Monal Trivedi
- Bhavwini Gandhi as Canny Kapoor
- Deepak Dutta as Deven Trivedi
- Pooja Patel as Neelu’s Daughter
- Prashant Barot as Joshi Sir
- Mellisa Pais as Chitra Malhotra

== Production ==
The film was shot at various locations in Vadodara Gujarat. Javed Ali and Manhar Udhas has given their vocals for the film songs.

== Soundtrack ==
Javed Ali Mann Jeetva Maange sung by Javed Ali lyrics has written by Cchinmay Purohit and Lo Karu Koshish sung by Manhar Udhas, lyrics has written by Rajendra Shukla, Vinay Kapadia has composed all songs of the album.

Jalebi Rocks

Soundtrack album
- Released: 2025
- Genre: Feature film soundtrack
- Length: 13:45
- Language: Gujarati
- Label: Goosebumps Studios

=== Tracklist ===
Track listing
No.	Title	Lyrics	Music	Singer(s)	Length
1.	"Mann Jeetva Maange"	Cchinmay P Purohit	Vinay Kapadia	Javed Ali	08.09
2.	"Lo Karu Koshish"	Rajendra Shukla	Vinay Kapadia	Manhar Udhas	05.36
Total length:					13.45

== Marketing and Releases ==
The teaser of the film released on 30 May 2025 on social media. The trailer of the film released on 10 June 2025 on social media

== See also ==
- List of Gujarati films of 2025
