= Time Out (Indian TV series) =

Comedy-drama mini web series

- Genre: Comedy-drama
- Written by: Danish Aslam; Jaya Misra
- Directed by: Danish Aslam
- Starring: Tahir Raj Bhasin; Sarah-Jane Dias
- Country of origin: India
- Original language: Hindi
- No. of seasons: 1
- No. of episodes: 6

Production
- Producers: Danish Aslam; Rishab Seth
- Cinematography: Jay Bhansali
- Editors: Vinay Mandal; Sundiip Singh; Pravin Jahagirdar

Time Out is an Indian 2017 comedy-drama mini web series directed by Danish Aslam and produced by Voot, starring Tahir Raj Bhasin and Sarah-Jane Dias in the lead roles. It premiered on the video streaming platform Voot in 2017.

== Plot ==
The series deals with marriage issues in a comic and dramatic way. It is about a happily married couple Rahul (Tahir Raj Bhasin) and Radha (Sarah-Jane Dias). Their relationship is full of romance and going smooth and sound. Rahul and his spouse, Radha, who is trying to become pregnant, find their journey beginning when Rahul learns that his wife is expecting. And, reinforcing most of the male stereotypes out there, Rahul does not want a kid. He realizes he has been leading the life he is supposed to and not necessarily the one he wants to.

== Cast ==
=== Main ===
- Tahir Raj Bhasin as Rahul
- Sarah-Jane Dias as Radha
- Rohan Khurana as Zain
- Shishir Sharma as Rajat
- Sahil Vaid as Ashish
- Bikramjeet Kanwarpal as Bansal
- Rashi Mal as Kaya
- Jugal Hansraj as Ved
- Mansi Multani as Priya

== Release ==
Time Out had released on Voot on 27 November 2017. Its trailer ammased nearly 107,000 views on YouTube.

== Episodes ==
=== Season 1 ===
Series	Episodes	Originally released
1	6	27 November 2017

No. overall	No. in season	Title	Directed by	Original release date
1	1	"Can you hit pause on life?"	Danish Aslam	27 November 2017
2	2	"Baby or Bae?"	Danish Aslam	27 November 2017
3	3	"On a sabbatical, from marriage!"	Danish Aslam	27 November 2017
4	4	"It's official! We're on a break"	Danish Aslam	27 November 2017
5	5	"Collision course and collateral damage"	Danish Aslam	27 November 2017
6	6	"Will he, won't he?"	Danish Aslam	27 November 2017

== Reception ==
=== Critical reviews ===
Almas Khateeb of The Quint wrote "here really are no shades of grey with such shows. I do give it to Voot for coming up with Time Out. It does address issues like ‘urban poverty’, extra-marital affairs, unwilling parenthood, and more. What it doesn't do however, is execute them with any reality."

Rahul Desai from Film Companion said "Time Out is pretentious and silly because it tries to appear confident about its decorated sentiments and sanitized sinning. It's important someone like Tahir Raj Bhasin realises that he can be better than this. It's essential that the makers don't think they can continue creating myopic Riverdale worlds out of real-life experiences."

A reviewer for The Opinionated Indian reviewed the show more positively "Romcom aficionados will love this show. The show can be enjoyed by the Netflix drama loving audience as well. Do not watch it expecting to get an out of this world experience. It is a simple story, made complex by the life choices of the lead pair. It does have a message for all urban married couples, who have started off on their journey together."
