= Neha Chauhan =

Indian actress

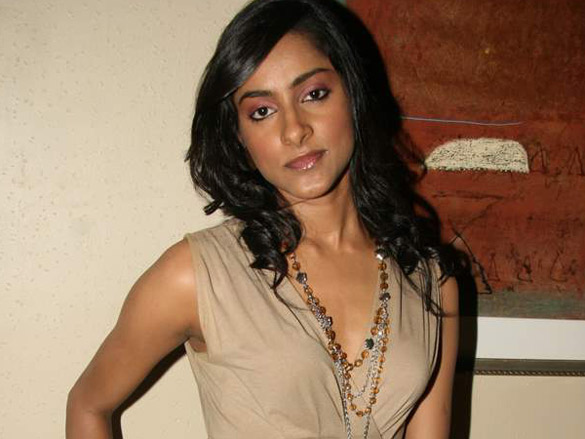
- Neha Chauhan at the Love Sex Aur Dhokha bash
- Born: Nigeria
- Occupation: Actress
- Years active: 2010–present

Neha Chauhan is an Indian actress who works in Hindi films. She is best known for her appearances in the found-footage drama Love Sex Aur Dhokha (2010) and the Haryanvi-Hindi drama G Kutta Se (2015).

== Early life ==
Neha was born in Nigeria and moved to Faridabad, India. Her father is from Bijnor and her mother is from Moradabad. She spent most of her life in Indore, Madhya Pradesh and moved to Mumbai to become a film director.

== Career ==
She debuted with the Bollywood film Love Sex Aur Dhokha (2010). She was cast after Dibakar Banerjee saw her in her brother's wedding video. Though Chauhan wanted to assist Banerjee, he chose her for the role of Rashmi. Besides, she also took on the role of assistant to the casting director of the film and auditioned her co-actors. She was nominated for the Screen Award for Best Supporting Actress for her performance.

She made her Tamil film debut in the movie Yaan (2014). She worked in the Haryanvi Hindi bilingual G Kutta Se (2015), which met with critical acclaim, praising her performance. She has appeared in the critically acclaimed English movie A Billion Colour Story (2014). She then starred in the web series It's Not That Simple (2016), Humorously Yours (2016), Shaitaan Haveli (2018), and Inside Edge (2019). She has also acted in the Telugu film Aaviri (2019).

She plays the role of Kalpana Kaul in the web series Maharani. Her highly acclaimed role came when she played Kamla Chowdhry in the web series Rocket Boys.

== Filmography ==
=== Films ===
Year	Title	Role	Language	Notes	Ref
2010	Love Sex Aur Dhokha	Rashmi	Hindi	Debut	
2013	Geek Out	The girl	English	Short	
2014	Yaan	Isha	Tamil	Tamil debut	
2014	Yudh	Aruna	Hindi	Sony TV Series	
2015	G Kutta Se	Kiran	Haryanvi; Hindi		
2016	A Billion Colour Story	Divya	English; Hindi		
2018	Teen Paheliyan	Monika	Hindi	anthology film Mirchi Malini	
2018	Hope Aur Hum	Auto girl	Hindi		
2019	Aaviri	Leena	Telugu	Telugu debut	
2021	Kaagaz	Journalist Sonia	Hindi		

=== Web series ===
Year	Title	Role	Language	Platform	Ref
2016	It's Not That Simple	Anika	Hindi	Voot	
2016	Humorously Yours	Prachi	English; Hindi	ZEE5	
2018	Shaitaan Haveli	Prarthana	Hindi	Amazon Prime Video	
2019	Inside Edge	Shikha	Hindi; English	Amazon Prime Video	
2021–present	Maharani	Kalpana Kaul	Hindi	SonyLIV	
2022–2023	Rocket Boys	Kamla Chowdhry	Hindi	SonyLIV	
2024	Moonwalk	Azmat	Hindi	Jiocinema	
