= Shaitaan Haveli =

- Genre: Horror; Comedy
- Created by: Varun Thakur
- Country of origin: India
- Original language: Hindi
- No. of seasons: 1
- No. of episodes: 8

Production
- Running time: 22 minutes

Original release
- Network: Amazon Prime Video
- Release: 5 January 2018

Shaitaan Haveli is an Indian horror comedy television series created by Varun Thakur directed by Ajay Singh and produced by OML Production. The show stars Bhupesh Singh, Varun Thakur and Neha Chauhan. Shaitaan Haveli premiered on 5 January 2018 on Amazon Prime Video.

== Episodes ==
No.	Title	Original release date
1	"India Ka Nolain"	5 January 2018
2	"Dracula Ka Sauda"	5 January 2018
3	"Zombie Ki Maut"	5 January 2018
4	"Horror Ki Ma Ki Shoot"	5 January 2018
5	"Janta Hai Mera Purvaj Kaun Hai"	5 January 2018
6	"Picchar Ka Hero"	5 January 2018
7	"Chandaal Chudail aur Who"	5 January 2018
8	"Climax"	5 January 2018
