= Manasi Rachh =

Indian film actress

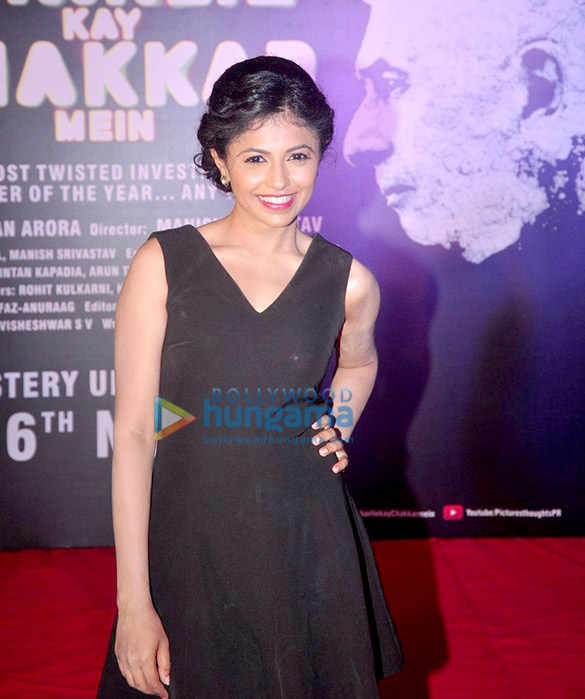
- Manasi Rachch at the screening of Charlie Kay Chakkar Mein
- Occupations: Actress; model
- Years active: 2011-present

Manasi Rachh is an Indian actress and model . She made her debut in 2011 with the film Mujhse Fraaandship Karoge and was noted for her performance in the Karan Johar movie Student of the Year. She is also noted for her ads as well as her work in theatre.

== Early life and career ==
Manasi Rachh was born and brought up in Mumbai, Maharashtra. She did her schooling at Little Angel’s High School in Maharashtra and finished her bachelor's in mass media. She debuted in Bollywood, portraying the role of the fierce Neha in Mujhse Fraaandship Karoge (2011). This performance made director Karan Johar notice her talent. So he auditioned her for the role of Shruti Pathak and won the role, alongside other debutants Sidharth Malhotra, Alia Bhatt, and Varun Dhawan, in Student of the Year (2012). Manasi continues to act in plays and films, on TV, and on the big screen. She appeared in a web series It's Not That Simple (2018) as Natasha (Nats) aired on Voot with other featured cast members Swara Bhaskar, Purab Kohli and Sumeet Vyas. She also played Maddy in season 2 of the Indian TV series 24 (2016).

== Filmography ==
=== Films ===
Year	Title	Role	Language	Notes	Refs
2011	Mujhse Fraaandship Karoge	Neha	Hindi	Debut	
2012	Student of the Year	Shruti Pathak	Hindi		
2015	Charlie Kay Chakkar Mein	Nina	Hindi	Lead Role	
2016	Khaatti Meethi Setting	Mehar	Gujarati	Lead Role	
2018	Storm in a Teacup	Aditi	Hindi	Short film	
2020	Vickida No Varghodo	Vidya	Gujarati	Lead role	
2020	My Sun Sets To Rise Again	Asha	English	Short film	
2021	Millennial Zindagi		Gujarati	Web film	
2023	Welcome Purnima		Gujarati	Lead role	
2025	Aachari Baa	Manorama	Hindi		
2025	Jalebi Rocks	Munni	Gujarati		

=== TV series ===
Year	Title	Role	Channel	Notes
2014	Love by Chance	Shaina	Bindass	
2016	24	Maddy	Colors TV	Season 2
2016	Yeh Hai Aashiqui	Aarohi	Bindass	Season 4
2017–present	Indian Martial Arts - Ek Itihaas	Anchor	Epic	
2023–present	Hu Tu Ane Hu Tu Tu Tu		Colours Gujarati	

=== Web series ===
Year	Title	Role	Platform
2018	It's Not That Simple	Natasha (Nats)	Voot
2018	Screwed Up	Ruha	
2018	Truth or Tamanna?	Jackie	Voot
2021	Hindmata	Sudha Nath	Eros Now
2022	Moh Maya Machine		Oho Gujarati
2023	Scoop	Neha Gupta	Netflix
