= Break Ke Baad =

2010 Indian film by Danish Aslam

- Poster
- Directed by: Danish Aslam
- Written by: Danish Aslam; Renika Kunzru
- Produced by: Kunal Kohli
- Starring: Imran Khan; Deepika Padukone
- Cinematography: Andre Menezes
- Edited by: Anand Subaya
- Music by: Songs: Vishal–Shekhar; Background Score: Hitesh Sonik
- Production company: Kunal Kohli Productions
- Distributed by: Reliance BIG Pictures
- Release date: 26 November 2010
- Running time: 1 hour 47 minutes
- Country: India
- Language: Hindi
- Budget: ₹180 million

Break Ke Baad (transl. After The Break) is a 2010 Indian Hindi-language romantic comedy film directed by Danish Aslam and produced by Kunal Kohli under Kunal Kohli Productions. The movie stars Imran Khan and Deepika Padukone, with a supporting cast of Shahana Goswami, Yudhishtr Urs, Sharmila Tagore, Navin Nischol, and Lillete Dubey.

Break Ke Baad received mixed-to-negative reviews. The film opened to an average response at the domestic box office and ultimately grossed approximately ₹28.41 crore worldwide against a reported budget of ₹18 crore (US$4.1 million). A mobile video game based on the film was released by Jump Games as part of its promotional campaign.

== Plot ==
Abhay Gulati (Imran Khan) and Aaliya Khan (Deepika Padukone) have been friends since childhood. Aaliya has always loved acting, since her mother is an actress. Her father left her and her mother. Abhay likes cooking but his father wants him to take care of his business. Eventually Abhay and Aaliya start dating but Aaliya does not want to marry. An opportunity comes for Aaliya to go to Australia for acting school which she takes. She goes to Australia where she has to live with her strict aunt. She then moves into a bungalow where a bunch of young people live for cheap. Abhay gets paranoid and comes to Australia, annoying Aaliya because she feels he doesn't trust her and they break up. Abhay opens a restaurant and it becomes a big hit. Aaliya and Abhay slowly become friends again. Aaliya finishes acting school and Abhay's father finds out about his restaurant. Abhay and Aaliya's mother, Ayesha (Sharmila Tagore) come for Aaliya's graduation. Aaliya gets an opportunity to work in a movie and signs the contract without telling her mother, thereby enraging her. Soon Abhay leaves Aaliya too, because she is selfish. Realizing she is wrong and that she can't go on without her mother's support, she quits the movie and rushes back to India to get back things on track with her mother. Soon, her mother realises that Aaliya is strong to face the world and can come to terms with her mistakes rather easily than her mother herself was capable of, so she allows her to act in the movie and sends her back again. However, soon she return to the same Australian city for shooting her movie, and meets Abhay, who tells her he still hasn't moved on. She apparently, convinces him to move on and get married. However, she is stunned when she comes to know from another friend that Abhay is going to be married. Puzzled as to why he didn't tell her first about the news, Aaliya rushes to Abhay's house and finds him getting ready to get married. Aaliya begs him to re-think his decision, proposing to him with the very ring he was considering for her once upon a time. She confesses her love to him and tells him that she is really in love with him. Abhay, realising Aaliya's regret and love for him, shows her his wedding invitation which has her name, implying he intended to marry her all along. She is happy and they embrace, making up. The end credits show that the two are married, and have a daughter named Sara.

== Cast ==
- Imran Khan as Abhay Gulati / Gelato
  - Namit Shah as Young Abhay
  - Parzaan Dastur as Teenage Abhay
- Deepika Padukone as Aaliya Khan / Aaliya Abhay Gulati aka Al
  - Ziyah Vastani as Young Aaliya
- Sharmila Tagore as Ayesha Khan, Aaliya's mother
- Shahana Goswami as Nadia "Nads"
- Yudhishtar Urs as Cyrus
- Lillete Dubey as Pammi Gulati, Abhay's aunt
- Naveen Nischol as Jeet Gulati, Abhay's father
- Suparna Marwah as Khaala, Ayesha's sister
- Divyaalakshmi as Preeti Gulati
- Rohan Mantri as Jai
- Neelu Kohli as Kamal Gulati, Abhay's mother
- Gaurav Nanda as Theatre Director
- Kamlesh Ojha as Rishabh Malhotra
- Nyesha Arora as Sara Gulati, Abhay and Aaliya's daughter

== Release ==
Break Ke Baad was released theatrically in India on 26 November 2010. The film was distributed by Reliance BIG Pictures.

== Reception ==
=== Box office ===
The film opened to a moderate response, earning ₹2.8 crore nett on its first day. Over its opening weekend, it collected ₹9.67 crore nett domestically and totaled to around ₹16.9 crore nett.

Internationally, the film garnered approximately US$690,000 on its first weekend and US$925,000
