= Baazaar =

2018 Indian financial thriller film directed by Gaurav K. Chawla

- Theatrical poster
- Directed by: Gauravv K. Chawla
- Written by: Story and Screenplay: Parveez Sheikh; Dialogues and Additional Screenplay: Aseem Arora
- Produced by: Nikhil Advani; Viacom18 Motion Pictures; Kyta Productions; Emmay Entertainment; B4U Movies
- Starring: Saif Ali Khan; Rohan Vinod Mehra; Radhika Apte; Chitrangada Singh; Denzil Smith
- Narrated by: Rohan Vinod Mehra
- Cinematography: Swapnil S. Sonawane
- Edited by: Maahir Zaveri; Arjun Srivastava
- Music by: Songs: Tanishk Bagchi; Yo Yo Honey Singh; Kanika Kapoor; Sohail Sen; Bilal Saeed; Score: John Stewart Eduri
- Production companies: Emmay Entertainment; Kyta Production; B4U Motion Pictures; Viacom18 Motion Pictures
- Distributed by: Anand Pandit Motion Pictures; Panorama Studios; Viacom18 Motion Pictures
- Release date: 26 October 2018
- Running time: 137 minutes
- Country: India
- Languages: Hindi; Gujarati

Baazaar (transl. Market) is a 2018 Indian Hindi-language financial thriller film directed by Gauravv K. Chawla and written by Parveez Sheikh and Aseem Arora. The film stars Saif Ali Khan, debutant Rohan Vinod Mehra, Radhika Apte and Chitrangada Singh in lead roles.

The film is set in the backdrop of money, power and business, largely based on the stock market. The film was released on 26 October 2018. The film received mixed reviews from critics.

== Plot ==
Small-town Allahabad-based stock trader Rizwan Ahmed arrives in Mumbai by flight. He is determined to work with his role model, the wealthy and ruthless Gujarati stock market leader Shakun Kothari, whom everyone calls as a "fraud". Rizwan bluffs his way into the city's largest trading firm and manages to convince them to give him a job. He ropes in a high-profile client, and with the help of his co-worker and girlfriend Priya Rai, he begins a successful career at the firm. When attending an event with Priya, he spots Shakun Kothari and gives stock advice that turns out to be correct. Kothari then hires him as his broker, warning that he may never lose any of his money. After his first trade with Kothari's funds ends badly, Rizwan is desperate not to lose Kothari's account and illegally uses insider information from Priya to recoup Kothari's losses.

Rizwan becomes close to Kothari and his wife Mandira, visiting Kothari's mansion and relaxing on his yacht with Priya. Meanwhile, Kothari offers Rizwan a chance to make even more money when he learns that the government is going to begin accepting bids from telecommunications companies for a new project. Kothari informs Rizwan that he has bribed a government minister to select an I-T company called Skycom, and the two can make a killing on the deal. Kothari gives Rizwan the money to buy Skycom, and Rizwan becomes the company's owner. Rizwan convinces his new brother-in-law Anwar to invest all of his savings to Skycom shares. However, Skycom's bid is rejected, and Rizwan is ruined when Kothari sells off all of his Skycom shares right before the announcement of the bid winner.

Rizwan discovers that Kothari deliberately set him up to take the fall for Skycom for Kothari's own personal monetary profit and that he arranged for Priya to influence him from the beginning. SEBI agents, led by Rana Dasgupta, detain Rizwan for insider trading, though their real target is Kothari. Rizwan convinces them that Shakun has been using old school methods which will not leave any evidence or trail behind. Using information from Mandira, Rizwan is able to prove that Kothari has been bribing government ministers with diamonds that are smuggled via the Surat-Mumbai Karnavati Express train. Shakun is arrested, and his family leaves him. After the numerous court hearings, Shakun is summoned as Priya gives in as a witness to the bribes. Rizwan questions her as to why she surrendered herself since Rizwan did not reveal her name, but she leaves Rizwan, saying she deserves this. Shakun comes out on bail after a month and returns to his empty house, his wife and kids gone. He calls his secretary and tells him, that the market (Baazaar) is open, returning to his deeds.

== Cast ==
- Saif Ali Khan as Shakun Kothari, main protagonist (loosely based on Harshad Mehta)
  - Varun Buddhadev as Child Shakun
- Rohan Vinod Mehra as Rizwan Ahmed
- Radhika Apte as Priya Rai
- Chitrangada Singh as Mandira Kothari
  - Miloni Kapadia as Young Mandira
- Raddheya Mahendru as Alisha Kothari
- Anika Malhotra as Nayantara Kothari
- Sonia Balani as Aamna Ahmed
- Pawan Chopra as Zulfiqar Ahmed
- Denzil Smith as Kishore Wadhwa
- Karan Singh Chhabra as stock exchange reporter
- Manish Choudhary as Rana Dasgupta
- Ravindra Singh Bakshi as Balwinder
- Deepak Gheewala as Gaganbhai
- Utkarsh Mazumdar as Chhedha
- Abhishek Gupta as Anwar
- Ajit Satbhai as Bipinbhai
- Jeniffer Piccinato as Business woman
- Danish Husain as Dubey
- Krunal Pandit as Mani Shankar
- Vikram Kapadia as Sandeep Talwar
- Vijay Tilani as Aashish
- Sai Gundewar as Suhas Sharma
- Gaurav Sharma as Sagar Malhotra
- Sahil Sangha as Vineet Mehra
- Elli Avram (special appearance in song "Billionaire")
- Raamdeo Agrawal as himself

== Soundtrack ==
Baazaar

Soundtrack album by Tanishk Bagchi, Honey Singh, Kanika Kapoor, Sohail Sen and Bilal Saeed
- Released: 26 September 2018
- Recorded: 2014–2015
- Genre: Feature film soundtrack
- Length: 21:47
- Language: Hindi
- Label: Times Music
External audio
- Official Audio Jukebox on YouTube

Tanishk Bagchi chronology
Badhaai Ho (2018)	Baazaar (2018)	Zero (2018)

Yo Yo Honey Singh chronology
Mitron (2018)	Baazaar (2018)

Bilal Saeed chronology
Baar Baar Dekho (2016)	Baazaar (2018)

Sohail Sen chronology
Happy Phirr Bhag Jayegi (2018)	Baazaar (2018)	Fraud Saiyaan (2019)

The music of the film was composed by Tanishk Bagchi, Honey Singh, Kanika Kapoor, Sohail Sen and Bilal Saeed. The lyrics were penned by Shabbir Ahmed, Honey Singh, Ikka, Jamil Ahmed, Singhsta, Hommie Dilliwala, and Bilal Saeed.

Bilal Saeed recreated his own song La La La, which was originally sung by Arjun Kanungo.

Track listing
No.	Title	Lyrics	Music	Singer(s)	Length
1.	"Kem Cho"	Shabbir Ahmed, Ikka	Tanishk Bagchi	Ikka, Jyotica Tangri	2:13
2.	"Billionaire"	Honey Singh, Singhsta, Hommie Dilliwala	Honey Singh	Honey Singh, Simar Kaur, Singhsta	3:35
3.	"Adhura Lafz"	Jamil Ahmed	Sohail Sen	Rahat Fateh Ali Khan, Pratibha Singh	4:20
4.	"La La La"	Bilal Saeed	Bilal Saeed	Bilal Saeed, Neha Kakkar	3:07
5.	"Chhod Diya"	Shabbir Ahmed	Kanika Kapoor	Arijit Singh	5:20
6.	"Chhod Diya" (Unplugged)	Shabbir Ahmed	Kanika Kapoor	Kanika Kapoor	3:12
Total length:					21:47

== Release ==
The first poster was released on 4 May 2017 depicting Khan in a suit. The poster read, "Yaha paisa Bhagwaan nahi, par Bhagwaan se kam bhi nahi" (Here money is not God, but also it is not less than God).

The official trailer for the film was released on 25 September 2018. The film itself was released on 26 October 2018.

== Reception ==
The film received mostly mixed reviews from critics, who cited its similarity to Oliver Stone's Wall Street, but praised Saif Ali Khan for his performance. On the review aggregator site Rotten Tomatoes, 27% of 11 critics' reviews are positive, with an average rating of 4/10.
