= Akshay Oberoi =

Indian-American film actor (born 1985)

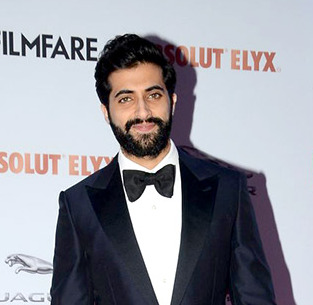
- Oberoi in 2016
- Born: 1 January 1985 (age 41); Morristown, New Jersey, U.S.
- Education: Johns Hopkins University
- Occupation: Actor
- Spouse: Jyothi Vynatheya (m. 2011)
- Children: 1
- Relatives: see Oberoi family

Akshay Oberoi (born 1 January 1985) is an American actor of Indian descent, who works in Hindi films. After making his acting debut as a child in the 2002 comedy-drama American Chai, Oberoi played his first leading role in Rajshri Productions film Isi Life Mein...! (2010). Oberoi has received critical acclaim for his work.

== Early life, family and education ==
Akshay Oberoi was born on 1 January 1985 in Morristown, Morris County, New Jersey, United States. He attended Newark Academy for middle school and high school and pursued a bachelor's degree in Theater Arts and Economics at Johns Hopkins University in Baltimore. He also completed acting training in Stella Adler in New York City and then Playhouse West in Los Angeles, where he learned the Meisner technique. During his education, he studied acting under John Astin from The Addams Family. He also studied ballet, jazz and hip-hop dance at Broadway Dance Center. He moved to India and did plays at the famous Prithvi Theatre and received training from Kishore Namit Kapoor.

Akshay's father, Krishan Oberoi, is the brother of the actor Suresh Oberoi and thus Akshay is the first cousin of Vivek Oberoi. He is of Punjabi descent.

== Career ==
Oberoi started his career by working at the famed Prithvi Theatre in Juhu with Makrand Deshpande. Starting with backstage work, Makrand later offered him a part in Miss Beautiful.

Oberoi then made his film debut in Sooraj Barjatya's Isi Life Mein. On its release the film failed to click at the box office. However, Oberoi was lauded by the critics for his work in the film. Taran Adarsh from Bollywood Hungama commented, "The only noteworthy aspect of the film is its lead pair. Akshay Oberoi is talented – no two opinions on that. He has good screen presence, but most importantly, he acts very well." Prathna Tiwari of BollySpice said, "The newcomers definitely are off to a good start. In particular Akshay Oberoi who has great screen presence, delivers his dialogues confidently and also proves to be eye candy for the ladies." Sarita Tanwar of Mid-Day noted, "Newcomer Akshay Oberoi is confident and delivers."

Oberoi moved to television work after the release of his first film. In 2012, he played the lead role in Bejoy Nambiar's MTV Rush. Nambiar, impressed with Oberoi's work on the show, offered him his second film, the Tamil remake of the suspense thriller Pizza. Pizza released on 18 July 2014, where Oberoi was once again praised by the critics. Renuka Vyavahare of The Times of India said, "Lead actor Akshay Oberoi does complete justice to the spine-chilling story with [his] compelling presence. We would like to see [this] actor more often on screen..." Taran Adarsh commented, "One witnesses a noticeable growth in Akshay Oberoi's performance, who interprets the challenging role with sincerity. The varied emotions that he gets to exhibit – anxiety, fright, vulnerability – come across well in several sequences" Sweta Kaushal of Hindustan Times noted, "An effortless performance by Akshay Oberoi make this horror flick worth a one-time watch." Subhash K. Jha said, "Akshay Oberoi's Kunal is a mixture of the timid and the defiant. He lets the character's confusions build up as the story progresses so that finally we see him as a victim in ways that we would never suspect otherwise. " Shubha Shetty-Saha of Mid-Day stated, "This remake...solely rests on the still young shoulders of newcomer Akshay Oberoi, who has to go through a range of emotions in the 120 plus minutes long duration of the film. A dream role for someone who's just about a film old, Pizza 3D has Oberoi in almost every frame and must say, he has done a decent job." Sneha May Francis of Emirates 24/7 noted, "Akshay Oberoi holds [the] fort impressively. He's impeccable as the timid Kunal, exploiting his insecurities and fears with maturity and restraint. For a bloke fresh on the Bollywood trail, that's bloody impressive..."

Oberoi has also received rave reviews for his work in Laal Rang and Gurgaon. Maggie Lee of Variety said of his work in Gurgaon, "Oberoi oozes bad-boy sexiness, injecting physical potency into Nikki's loose-canon behavior." and Film Campion's Rahul Desai said, "Oberoi's light-eyed cold-bloodedness lends credence to Gurgaon's volatility in a way that lets the film take any unresolved direction it chooses to." While Subhash K. Jha said, "it's Akshay Oberoi playing the outcast son who steals the thunder lighting and what-not. It's a big-bang performance, implosive and bursting at the seams with unspoken bitterness. Oberoi plays the truant son (a cliché in the crime genre) with much empathy and little compassion. In one sequence we see him brutally violate a prostitute in a bath tub. We know what levels of violence Nikki is capable of. Nikki doesn't disappoint."

== Media ==
Oberoi was ranked in The Times Most Desirable Men at No. 31 in 2020.

== Personal life ==
On 24 March 2011, Oberoi married Jyothi Vynatheya, a strategy consultant with Dalberg Global Development Advisors. Akshay first met Jyothi at Newark Academy. They have a son.

== Filmography ==
Key
†	Denotes films that have not yet been released

=== Films ===
Year	Title	Role	Notes
2002	American Chai	Neel	
2010	Isi Life Mein	Vivaan	
2014	Pizza	Kunal	
2015	Piku	Aniket	
2016	Fitoor	Mufti	
2016	Laal Rang	Rajesh	
2017	Gurgaon	Nikki	
2018	Kaalakaandi	Angad	
2019	Bombairiya	Abhishek	
2019	Gadhvi	Omkar	
2019	Ek Ladki Ko Dekha Toh Aisa Laga	Raza	Cameo appearance
2019	Junglee	Dev	
2021	Madam Chief Minister	Indramani "Indu" Tripathi	
2021	State of Siege: Temple Attack	Captain Bibek	
2022	Love Hostel	Diler	
2022	Thar	Arjun Singh	
2022	Judaa Hoke Bhi	Aman	
2023	Gaslight	Rana Jai Singh	
2023	I Love You	Vishal	
2024	Fighter	Squadron Leader Basheer "Bash" Khan	
2024	Chhote Nawab	Armaan	
2024	Ek Kori Prem Katha	Laddu Singh	
2024	Ghuspaithiya	Anshuman Singh	
2024	Kisko Tha Pata	Devansh	
2025	Sunny Sanskari Ki Tulsi Kumari	Param Singh	
2026	Toxic	Tony	Kannada-English bilingual film
2026	Love Lottery	Kartik Saxena	
2026	Gajab Raat	CBI officer Navin Madhok	
2026	King †	TBA	Filming
TBA	Varchasva †	Ajay	Filming
TBA	Two Zero One Four †	Firoz Masani	Filming

=== Web series ===
Year	Title	Role	Notes
2012	MTV Rush		1 episode
2015	Local Girlfriend	Dawal	
2016	It's Not That Simple	Sameer	6 episodes
2017	Bar Code	Sahil Chopra	10 episodes
2017	The Test Case	Captain Bilal Siddiqui	
2018	Selection Day	Anand Mehta	
2019	Hum Tum And Them	Yudi (Yudhistir)	
2020	Illegal	Akshay Jaitley	
2020	Flesh	Taj	
2020	High	Shiv Mathur	
2021	Illegal 2	Akshay Jaitley	
2021	Dil Bekaraar	Dlyan Shekhawat	
2021	Inside Edge	Rohit Shanbagh	Season 3
2022	Feels Like Home	Vicky	Cameo appearance
2024	Illegal 3	Akshay Jaitley	
2024	The Broken News 2	Ranjit Sabarwal	

=== Short films ===
Year	Title	Role	Notes
2016	Mama's Boys	Yudhishtir	
2016	The Virgins	Dhruv	
2017	Baby Steps	Dev	
2018	Mirchi Malini	Arjun	
2019	Masterpiece	Abheek	
2020	Smartphone	Vicky	Filmfare OTT Nomination Best Supporting Actor
