= It's Not That Simple =

Comedy-drama web series

- Genre: Comedy; Drama
- Written by: Danish Aslam; Charudutt Acharya; Jaya Misra
- Directed by: Danish Aslam
- Starring: Akshay Oberoi; Vivan Bhatena; Karan Veer Mehra; Swara Bhaskar; Sumeet Vyas; Purab Kohli; Manasi Rachh; Neha Chauhan; Rohan Shah; Devika Vatsa
- Country of origin: India
- Original language: Hindi
- No. of seasons: 2

Production
- Producers: Vaibhav Modi; Tabassum Modi
- Production company: Victor Tango Entertainment Pvt. Ltd.

Original release
- Release: 21 October 2016 – 14 December 2018

It's Not That Simple is a 2016 Indian comedy-drama web series starring Akshay Oberoi, Vivan Bhatena, Karan Veer Mehra, Swara Bhaskar, Sumeet Vyas, Purab Kohli, Manasi Rachh, Neha Chauhan, Rohan Shah and Devika Vatsa in the lead roles. It was written by Charudutt Acharya and directed by Danish Aslam. It originally premiered on Voot on 21 October 2016. Swara marked her web series debut with this and received praise for her performance.

== Cast ==
=== Main ===
- Akshay Oberoi as Sameer
- Vivan Bhatena as Rajiv
- Karan Veer Mehra as Jayesh
- Swara Bhaskar as Meera
- Sumeet Vyas as Dev
- Purab Kohli as Angad
- Manasi Rachh as Natasha
- Neha Chauhan as Anika
- Rohan Shah as Jassi
- Devika Vatsa as Tani
- Errol Peter Marks as Ronjoy
- Ishan Mishra as Mohit
- Jia Vaidya as Jhilmil
- Shobha Khote as Ajji
- Rumana Molla as Reha

== Episodes ==
=== Season 1 ===
Series	Episodes	Originally released
1	7	21 October 2016
2	7	14 December 2018

No. overall	No. in season	Title	Directed by	Original release date
1	1	"Machhli Ki Aankh"	Danish Aslam	21 October 2016
2	2	"War Cry #Trolls"	Danish Aslam	21 October 2016
3	3	"Risky Chemistry"	Danish Aslam	21 October 2016
4	4	"Clash Of The Ego"	Danish Aslam	21 October 2016
5	5	"Boardroom Vs Bedroom"	Danish Aslam	21 October 2016
6	6	"Hell Hath No Furry"	Danish Aslam	21 October 2016
7	7	"Rise Of The Phoenix"	Danish Aslam	21 October 2016

=== Season 2 ===
No. overall	No. in season	Title	Directed by	Original release date
1	1	"Season Premiere"	Danish Aslam	14 December 2018
2	2	"TwitterWar: Mira vs Angad"	Danish Aslam	14 December 2018
3	3	"4 kisses, 1 party and a 30-sec pitch"	Danish Aslam	14 December 2018
4	4	"Man vs Woman: The ego tussle"	Danish Aslam	14 December 2018
5	5	"The wounded tigress"	Danish Aslam	14 December 2018
6	6	"Kaun sahi kaun galat"	Danish Aslam	14 December 2018
7	7	"Sher ki sawari"	Danish Aslam	14 December 2018

== Release ==
The series was announced to consist of 7 episodes as part of the first season on 6 October 2016 and started airing on Voot on 21 October 2016. It was written by Charudutt Acharya. The second season was announced by Voot on 30 August 2018 along with 16 other new original series.

== Reception ==
=== Season 2 reviews ===
The series received mixed responses from critics. It was praised for its performances by Swara Bhaskar and Sumeet Vyas while it was criticised by some for its story.

Sreehari Nair of Rediff.com gave 2 stars, criticizing its plot while praising the performance of the cast "What holds the show together is the cast; performers who frequently rise above their stodgy lines to bring something personal to the table." She added "It's Not That Simple is, at its core, a speeded-up, foul-mouthed version of shows like Shanti and Swabhimaan -- those Doordarshan soaps where business magnates had secrets that only their slavish butlers knew about."

Soumya Rao of Scroll.in mentioned "Strong performances come to the rescue when the dialogue and plot fall flat. The surface-scratching observations about gender bias and stereotypes are complemented by a couple of genuinely strong moments."

A reviewer for Firstpost said "Performance wise, It's Not That Simple season 2 earns brownie points. Vivan oscillates perfectly between the obsessive friend and repulsed, homophobic lover. Sumeet is unsurprisingly on point. His predatory nature is well-fleshed out, all the while keeping it understated. Swara Bhasker does justice to a role tailor-made for her"

The Indian Express gave 3 stars, saying "the focus here is on Swara who looks svelte and gives her character a heft and heave that never seem manufactured. Some of the dialogues do sound like bumper sticker wisdom and WhatsApp forwards."
