= My Friend Pinto =

- Theatrical release poster
- Directed by: Raaghav Dar
- Written by: Raaghav Dar
- Produced by: Sanjay Leela Bhansali; Ronnie Screwvala
- Starring: Prateik Babbar; Kalki Koechlin
- Edited by: Shan Mohammed; Dipika Kalra
- Music by: Songs: Ajay–Atul; Guest Composers: Hitesh Sonik; Shamir Tandon; Kavita Seth; Score: Hitesh Sonik
- Production companies: UTV Motion Pictures; Sanjay Leela Bhansali Films; Prime Focus
- Distributed by: UTV Motion Pictures
- Release date: 14 October 2011
- Running time: 100 minutes
- Country: India
- Language: Hindi
- Budget: ₹ 90 million
- Box office: ₹ 18 million

My Friend Pinto is a 2011 Indian Hindi-language musical comedy film written and directed by Raaghav Dar, in his feature-length directorial debut. It stars Prateik Babbar as Michael Pinto, a well intentioned simpleton and follows his misadventures over the course of New Year's Eve in Mumbai. Produced by Sanjay Leela Bhansali and Ronnie Screwvala, and distributed by UTV Motion Pictures, it has elements of picaresque, slapstick comedy and multiple musical sequences. The film features Kalki Koechlin, Arjun Mathur, Shruti Seth, Makarand Deshpande, Rajendranath Zutshi and Divya Dutta in supporting roles.

Although Dar had written the script while working as an assistant director on Jaane Tu... Ya Jaane Na (2008), it was not until he met Bhansali that he began working on a proper screenplay. Conceived as a musical comedy, My Friend Pinto had multiple sequences choreographed by Longinus Fernandes, featuring Babbar and Koechlin primarily. Principal photography was done over a period of two and a half years in South Mumbai, mostly during night. The film's soundtrack was composed by the music director duo Ajay–Atul, while Hitesh Sonik composed the background score and a surplus song.

My Friend Pinto was released theatrically on 14 October 2011 to mixed responses from film critics. While the performances of the majority of the cast were favourably reviewed, the film drew criticism for its scattered screenplay and the several underdeveloped subplots. At the box-office, it collected a total of ₹18 million (US$190,000) in its entire theatrical run against the production costs of approximately ₹90 million (US$930,000).

== Plot ==
Michael Pinto is a well-intentioned simpleton born and brought up in a small Goan village. His world revolves around his doting mother and his passion for music. After his mother's sudden death, he decides to become a priest to fulfill her last wish. Before attending school, he plans to visit his childhood friend Sameer in Mumbai. At a train station, Michael unknowingly disrupts a meeting between Maggie, an aspiring dancer who instantly attracts his attention, and a crook who intends to sell her to a pimp in Delhi. Michael is left alone at Sameer and his wife Suhani's apartment when they leave for a party.

Michael accidentally locks himself out on the apartment's balcony. He escapes through a nearby drainage pipe but ends up in a music shop, where he encounters a local don, who is impressed by Michael's musical talent. The don heads a disorganised criminal organisation, which is responsible for a recent kidnapping. His assistant Mac plans to assassinate him to take over his position and blackmails two of the don's most loyal henchmen, Ajay and Vijay, into doing the job.

While stuck in traffic, Sameer and Suhani contemplate their relationship problems, which are mainly triggered by Suhani's workaholic nature and close relationship with her boss, Venky. Michael, meanwhile, continues to wander the streets of Mumbai: over the course of the night, he rescues a stray dog and helps a gambler win money to pay off his debts, only to have his wallet stolen soon after. He later spots Maggie on the top of a building, presumably attempting suicide, and comes to her rescue. He finds out that she was supposed to leave for Delhi with an agent who had promised to help her become a dancer (unaware of the man's true intentions). Michael, who is enamoured with Maggie's personality, finds out that she was supposed to leave for Delhi with an agent who had promised to help her become a dancer (unaware of the man's true intentions). He tries to cheer her up, and the two dance together in the rain. She tells him that she ran away from her house because her mother, despite being a dancer herself, was against her taking up the profession. In return, he tells her about his only dream, which is to be a good son. Maggie gives Michael her phone number before leaving.

Michael gets in an accident with a drunken female driver, Reshma, a yesteryear actress, and the don's girlfriend. He offers her a ride home, which she accepts. At her home, Reshma explains to him, in drunken stupor, that she suspects the don of infidelity. The don arrives at the house to declare his love for Reshma. Michael meanwhile daydreams about Maggie while playing a guitar in the backyard. The don invites him to his party, where Michael comes across Sameer and Suhani and everyone else that he had encountered over the night. He also briefly reunites with Maggie, who is performing at the party. She is taken hostage and put into a deep freeze refrigerator, alongside a dead body that Ajay and Vijay had been carrying around all night, as she overhears Mac's plan to assassinate the don. Unable to bring themselves to terms with killing their boss, Ajay and Vijay free Maggie and later surrender to the police.

Meanwhile, the don invites Michael onto the stage for a performance, and the latter obliges. Suhani berates Venky as he makes a pass at her and reconciles with Sameer. Michael sabotages Mac's plan to kill the don and ends his performance with a huge applause from the audience. Michael re-unites with Suhani and Sameer. As Michael glances across the crowd, he finds a smiling Maggie walking towards him and smiles back at her.

== Cast ==
The cast is listed below:

- Prateik Babbar as Michael Pinto
  - Meet Mukhi as Little Michael Pinto
- Kalki Koechlin as Maggie
- Arjun Mathur as Sameer
- Shruti Seth as Suhani
- Makarand Deshpande as Don
- Rajendranath Zutshi as Mac
- Divya Dutta as Reshma
- Shikha Talsania as Neha
- Shakeel Khan
- Adhir Bhatt as Venky
- Amin Hajee as Ajay
- Karim Hajee as Vijay
- Aseem Hattangady as Bhargava
- Faisal Rashid as Abhay
- Surendra Rajan as Omar Chacha
- Arjun Dhanraj as Nakul
- Milind Joshi as Father Simon

== Production ==
=== Development ===
Conceived as a musical comedy, My Friend Pinto was directed by Raaghav Dar in his directorial debut. He had previously worked as an assistant director under such directors as Mani Ratnam for the 2007 biographical romance drama film Guru and Abbas Tyrewala for the 2008 romantic comedy film Jaane Tu... Ya Jaane Na. It was while working on the latter that Dar devised the script for his first feature film. My Friend Pinto was produced by filmmaker Sanjay Leela Bhansali, in his first feature film production venture. He came across the script while he was working on an opera with Dar. Bhansali was impressed by the "fabulous and fascinating" script's humor, perspective and unusual characters. He was also drawn towards the project because it was unlike anything that he had previously done.

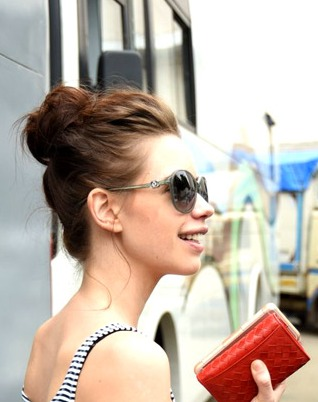
Koechlin was cast as the female lead for the film amidst rumours of other takers.

Pre-production work began after Bhansali agreed to produce the film. With assistance from him, Dar started work on adapting the first draft into a full-length screenplay. In an interview with Shilpa Jamkhandikar of the Daily News and Analysis, Bhansali said that he did not want to interfere with the film's creative process, and while present at the time of scripting and editing, he gave the film a certain space to grow. Reinstating his faith in Dar's abilities as a director, he said, "He has learnt a lot, has enough aptitude, has struggled and realised what it means to work here." Sahirr Sethhi worked as a script supervisor for Dar.

Prateik Babbar was cast in the title role of Michael Pinto, a dimwitted but well intentioned simpleton from Goa. He first met Dar during the filming of Jaane Tu... Ya Jaane Na. While working on the project, the two made an agreement that Babbar would star in Dar's film, if he was to direct one. Media reports in January 2010 suggested that Dar and Bhansali were auditioning for a newcomer to star opposite Babbar as the female lead for the film. Shraddha Kapoor was rumoured to be linked with the project during the early stages, but it was later confirmed that Kalki Koechlin had been selected for the role. Dar contacted Koechlin through Twitter after reading her post where she talked about being offered only "dark" roles. He then approached her with the film's script and suggested her to Bhansali, who eventually signed her for the role of Maggie, a naive Catholic girl form Mumbai and an aspiring dancer. Babbar and Koechlin learnt Charleston, a dance form named after the harbour city in South Carolina, for a musical sequence in the film.

Arjun Mathur and Shruti Seth co-starred as the unwilling hosts for the title character in the film. Seth said that she played a "superficial and disgruntled" character, who despite a successful career seemed to have lost faith in human relationships. Divya Dutta, who played the role of a failed actress, said that she signed up for the project because of its "lovely script". As most of the main cast members were oblivious to slapstick, they attended workshops where they worked on their comic timing, body language, and speech mannerism required for the roles. Makrand Deshpande, Raj Zutshi, Shakeel Khan, and Shikha Talsania play supporting roles in the film.

=== Filming and post-production ===
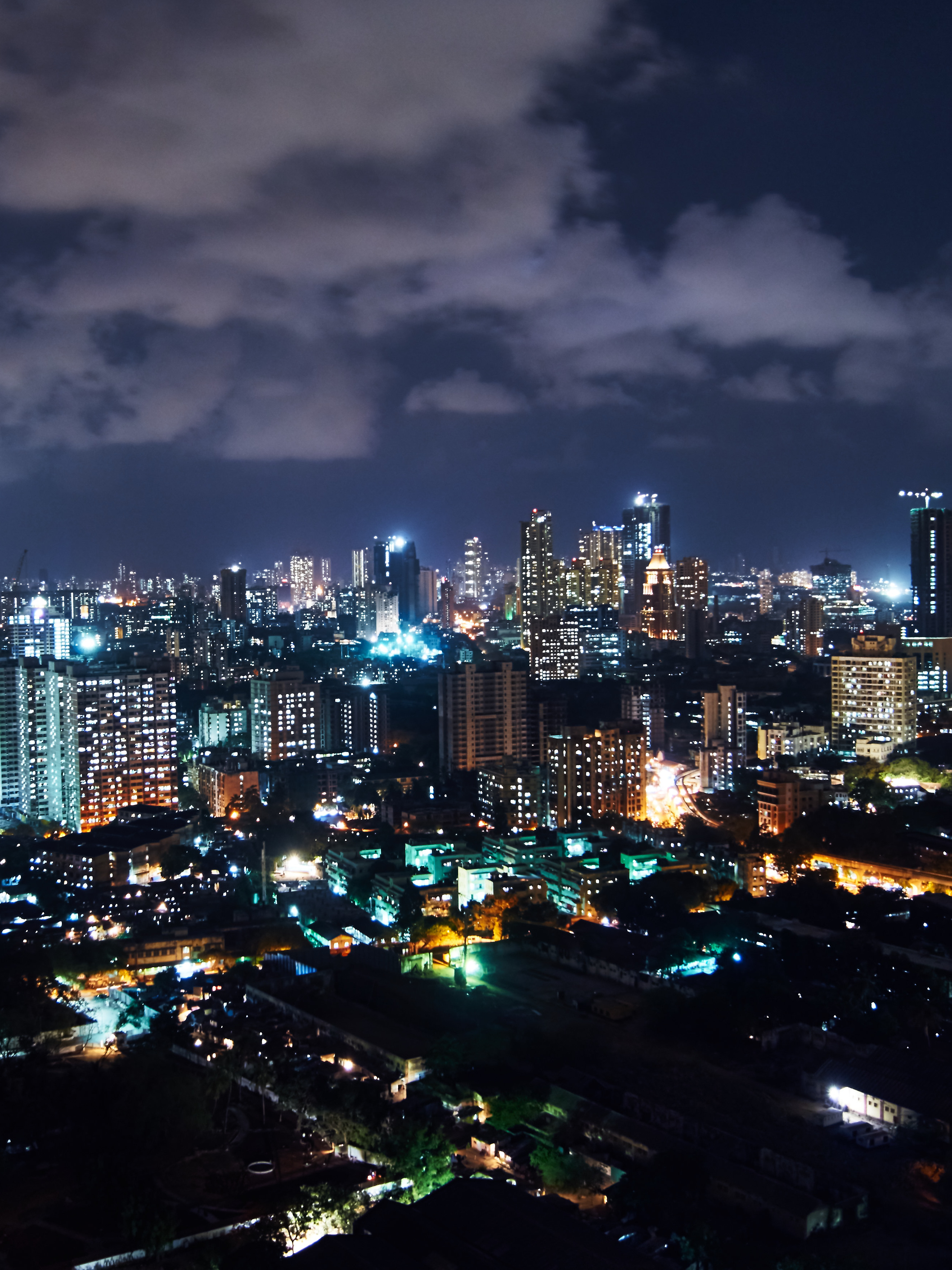
Filming took place in Mumbai, mostly at night.

Principal photography on the film was done on the streets of South Mumbai; it was shot in parts over a period of two-and-a-half years. Filming was especially difficult as it was done mostly during night-time and the crew's "sleeping schedule went for a toss". As most of the scenes were shot on the streets of Mumbai, the crew had problems managing the scenic design; on one occasion a cow entered the premises which stalled the filming for hours altogether. In an interview with Shibani Bedi of India Today, Babbar said that the entire crew used to have multiple discussions on various aspects of the film throughout the entire filming process. During the last schedule in September 2010, Babbar worked extra hours to complete filming for the project to carry through with other commitments. Sunny Kaushal served as associate director in the film.

My Friend Pinto had multiple musical sequences choreographed by Longinus Fernandes; the performers did not sing any songs during the sequences, but instead lip synced to previously recorded soundtracks. Aparna Raina and Sham Kaushal worked as the production designer and the action director respectively. Post-production work took place in the first half of 2011. The team of editors for the film was headed by Film and Television Institute of India alumni Shan Mohammed and Dipika Kalra. The film's final cut of the film ran for a total of 115 minutes Some scenes featuring Koechlin had to undergo additional dialogue replacement (ADR). The sound mixing, ADR, and foley was done by local sound engineer Stephen Gomes. The film was made on a total budget of around ₹90 million (US$930,000); its international distribution rights were acquired by UTV Motion Pictures.

== Soundtrack ==
The film's music was composed by composer duo of Ajay and Atul Gogavale. The lyrics were primarily written by Amitabh Bhattacharya, with the exception of the song "Intezaar" which featured both English and Hindi lyrics written by Charan Jeet and Deepa Sheshadari. Kunal Ganjawala, Gayatri Ganjawala, K.K., Sunidhi Chauhan, and the Nirmatee group variously served as vocalists for the tracks in the album. The complete album was released on 23 September 2011.

== Release ==
=== Marketing and release ===
The first look of My Friend Pinto featured a smiling Babbar wearing a diving mask and a swimfin, while playing a guitar. Another poster featuring Babbar and Koechlin was released alongside the first look; the former was dressed in a leisure suit, while the latter wore a Traje de flamenca (a flamenco dress). A two-and-a-half minute long trailer for the film was released on 14 April 2011 on UTV Motion Pictures' official YouTube channel. My Friend Pinto was released theatrically on 14 October 2011. The DVD for the film was released on 8 February 2012.

=== Box office ===
My Friend Pinto released theatrically in India in less than 400 screens and witnessed poor opening at the box office. It collected a meager sum of ₹2.4 million (US$25,000) on its opening day. The figures did not improve much over the next two days, and the film managed to collect a total of just ₹8.7 million (US$90,000) during its opening weekend. The film performed badly in rural territories as the film collected insignificant totals of ₹3.2 million (US$33,000) and ₹1 million (US$10,000) in parts of Rajasthan and Bihar respectively. Improved numbers in such urban markets as Mumbai and New Delhi, where the film collected ₹6.5 million (US$67,000) and ₹2.9 million (US$30,000) respectively, brought the first week gross to a total of ₹16.5 million (US$170,000). The film collected a total of around ₹18 million (US$190,000) in its entire theatrical run.

Despite being associated with big production houses like SLB Films and UTV Motion Pictures, the film failed to garner much attention prior to its release, and that eventually translated into the poor opening at the box office. Babbar was vocal about his disappointment regarding the manner in which the film was marketed, and criticised Bhansali's lack of involvement in promoting the project. However, the latter's spokesperson stated the contrary, saying that Bhansali had attended the promotional events in New Delhi and had given public interviews, something that he had not done for any of his previous ventures.

== Critical reception ==
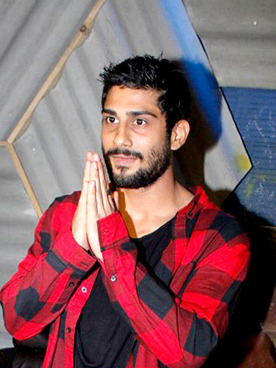
Babbar drew mixed response for his performance as the well-intentioned simpleton.

The film opened to mixed response from critics. Although the script drew criticism for its numerous subplots and inconsistent humour, the direction was mostly well received. The Indo-Asian News Service review was largely laudatory of the fiercely novel concept of the film that managed to deliver "tongue-in-cheek swipes at [...] Bollywood that we grew up watching and loving without knowing why we loved them in the first place." The reviewer also made note of the film's complex script, and asserted that although it was a difficult act to pull off on screen, Dar does it with "fluency and grace". Less impressed with the script was Preeti Arora of Rediff.com, who said that a simple quirky idea cannot guarantee a good film. She was also critical of the poor execution of the slapstick humor, which according to her needed an "edgy script, crisp repartee and laugh-a-minute gags" to work in the first place. News18's Jhunki Sen was also appreciative of the film's low-key humour, saying that the viewers would "leave the hall with a silly grin on your face".

Despite the overall mixed response, the film's cast, Koechlin and Dutta in particular, drew praise for their performances. Arora felt that Koechlin carried off her role effortlessly and took note of Dutta's appeal and "oomph factor", while adding that she was capable of doing much more with her character. In contrast, Mint's Sanjukta Sharma highlighted Dutta's power-packed performance as the best among the ensemble. In a mixed review for The Times of India a reviewer singled out the arc involving Koechlin as being as the only respite in the film where, "all the goodness seems lost in too many subplots". The reviewer commented negatively on the lack of screen time for Koechlin's character. Response to Babbar's performance in the film was polarised, with varying reviews calling him "visibly awkward" and "charismatic". He was also dubbed as an odd choice in the role by some critics. In her review for GQ, Megha Shah deemed him average and remarked that he, "isn’t as heartwarming [...] but doesn’t grate on your nerves either". Noting the "visceral" screen presence that Babbar showcased in the film, Mayank Shekhar of Hindustan Times wrote that it might, "not be enough to support an entire movie. But it’s endearing all right."
