= Gurgaon (film) =

2016 Indian neo-noir thriller film

- Theatrical release poster
- Directed by: Shanker Raman
- Written by: Vipin Bhati; Shanker Raman; Sourabh Ratnu
- Produced by: Alan McAlex; Ajay G. Rai
- Starring: Akshay Oberoi; Ragini Khanna; Pankaj Tripathi; Arjun Fauzdar; Tarun Foujdar
- Cinematography: Vivek Shah
- Edited by: Shan Mohammed
- Music by: Naren Chandavarkar; Benedict Taylor; Rachita Arora
- Production company: JAR Pictures
- Release dates: 9 December 2016 (IFFA Macao); 4 August 2017
- Country: India
- Languages: Hindi; Haryanvi
- Box office: ₹ 67 million (Weekend gross)

Gurgaon is a 2016 Indian neo-noir thriller film directed by Shanker Raman and produced by the award-winning JAR Pictures studios. The film stars Akshay Oberoi, Ragini Khanna, Pankaj Tripathi and Arjun Fauzdar and is set in the metropolis of Gurgaon, Haryana.

The film premiered at the 2016 International Film Festival & Awards in Macao and was later released on 4 August 2017 worldwide. It was reviewed positively by critics.

== Plot ==
Nikki Singh (Akshay Oberoi) is a boxer and the wayward son of real estate tycoon, Kehri Singh (Pankaj Tripathi). He is often sidelined in favour of his sister, Preet (Ragini Khanna), whom Kehri considers his lucky charm. Kehri shrewdly runs Preet Real Estate, successfully, in his daughter's name. Preet has just returned from France, after completing her course in architecture, and convinces her father to create a park, instead of a multi-billion real estate project on a land closer to a forest.

Nikki places a large bet and loses it. On their way to a concert out of frustration of losing it, they kidnap Murthy, a guitarist, who was about to perform. The dealer gives him 3 days to pay him 10 million, that Nikki owes to him. Nikki hatches a plan to kidnap Preet, to repay his debt. With the help of his friend Rajvir (played by Arjun Fauzdar), they hire a small-time crook, Jonty, to get Preet to a safe house, which turns out not to be empty, as they had expected. They have to change their plans and Jonty demands more money for the botch up. On their way to Rajvir's home, they are held up by at a toll booth. There Jonty gets enraged at a person who has held up the counter unnecessarily. Jonty tries to interfere when suddenly the driver takes out his gun & shoot the toll booth operator. The bullet grazes Jonty's ears & he lies there shell-shocked as Rajveer abandons him. Nikki's mother gets a ransom call from Rajveer who demands 30 million. Later Jonty calls from Preet's phone, which is answered by her father. He demands a ransom of half a million. Kehri is confused and they finally call his estranged brother Bhoopi to track his daughter.

Next, we are shown a flashback where decades ago Kehri and Bhoopi are about to bury his newborn girl child (unwanted in regressive families, who think that a girl would bring the burden of dowry whereas a boy would be an heir and take care of them in their old age). As they are about the bury her, the baby cries and Bhoopi resists burying her, but Kehri nonetheless buries her. Later a sage tells him that his fortunes would turn only if they have a girl child. As Kehri has already buried his daughter, the sage advises them to adopt one. Kehri adopts Preet. The moment he does that, his fortunes turn & he is given a good offer by a builder for his land.

Kehri's elder brother refuses to part his land so Kehri kills his elder brother. Further Kehri becomes a real estate baron & hence considers Preet his lucky charm. Back to the present, the partner of Kehri is bitter about Kehri's change of mind regarding the multi-billion real-estate project now planned to be a park on request of Preet. He knows about the betting & kidnapping mess that Nikki is into. He offers him a bailout from it if Nikki agrees to replace his father.

Bhoopi is able to track Jonty and through him the hideout of Nikki where Preet being held. Before anyone can arrive, Preet has already escaped with Murthy. There is a confrontation between Bhupi and Nikki, where Nikki kills Bhupi and injures his father. Next Nikki gets a call from Preet who is along with Murthy asks for a ride home. On their way back, Nikki shoots Murthy and there is a scuffle between Nikki and Preet, which results in a car accident. Nikki, Rajveer and Chintu get out of the car, while they allow the car to slip into the lake which results in the drowning of Preet with Murthy.

Later Nikki takes the control of his father's business and attends the foundation stone ceremony for the multi-billion project on the land which was earlier earmarked for the park by Kehri on Preet's request. Meanwhile, Kehri is resigned to the wheelchair and Nikki's mother is shell-shocked. As Nikki is trying to console her, the next thing we see is Nikki shot dead by his mother.

== Cast ==
- Akshay Oberoi as Nikki Singh, the troublesome son of the rich real estate tycoon Kehri Singh.
- Pankaj Tripathi as Kehri Singh, the cold blooded father of Nikki and Preet and a real estate tycoon.
- Ragini Khanna as Preet Singh, the daughter of Kehri on whose name their real estate business runs.
- Shalini Vatsa as Karma Devi, the mother of Nikki and Preet
- Aamir Bashir as Bhupi Hooda
- Srinivas Sunderrajan as Anand Murthy
- Anna Ador as Sophie
- Ashish Verma as Chintu, brother of Nikki Singh
- Arjun Fauzdar as Rajvir
- Suryansh kapoor as young nikki

== Production ==
The film is directional debut by National Film Award Winning cinematographer Shanker Raman and is produced by Ajay G. Rai and Alan McAlex of award-winning JAR Pictures studios who have previously produced critically acclaimed films Nil Battey Sannata, Gangs of Wasseypur, Liar's Dice among others. The film before its release was screened at Film Bazaar in Panaji, Goa in 2015. The film was shot on location in Gurgaon and Akshay Oberoi and other actors had to learn Haryanvi language for the film. The poster of the film was unveiled by Anurag Kashyap in July 2017.

== Release ==
Gurgaon was released throughout India in limited number of screens and grossed ₹67 million in its first three days.

== Critical reception ==
Despite receiving critical acclaim, the movie was not a commercial success.

== Awards ==
The film won Prasad DI Award at the National Film Development Corporation's Film Bazaar in 2015.
