= Rohan Mehra (born 1991) =

Indian actor

- Born: Rohan Vinod Mehra; 1991; Mombasa, Kenya
- Occupation: Actor
- Years active: 2018–present
- Parent: Vinod Mehra (father)
- Family: Soniya Mehra (sister)

Rohan Mehra (born 1991), also known as Rohan Vinod Mehra, is an Indian actor who primarily works in Hindi films. The son of actor Vinod Mehra, he made his acting debut with the 2018 financial thriller film Baazaar. Mehra has since starred in 420 IPC (2021), Kaala (2023), and Adbhut (2024).

== Early life and family ==
Mehra is the son of late actor Vinod Mehra and his wife Kiran Mehra. He was born in 1991, shortly after his father's death in October 1990. His elder sister Soniya Mehra is also an actress who made her debut with Victoria No. 203. He was raised in Mombasa and went to the United Kingdom for his higher education.

== Career ==
Mehra started his acting career with the short films Afterword, An Incomplete Tune and Hum. He also directed first and last of these and worked as an assistant director in Bajirao Mastani. Mehra made his film debut with the 2018 film Baazaar opposite Radhika Apte, where he played a stock trader. While India Today noted, "Rohan Mehra in his debut role has plenty of screen time but there's only that much impression he can make with a long-drawn drama." Mint stated, "Rohan's sincerity compensates for his inexperience."

In 2021, Mehra played a lawyer in 420 IPC. Times of India stated, "Rohan Mehra is earnest as Balbir Chaudhary." Pinkvilla wrote, "Rohan owned every scene he did and his preparation for the movie was visible." In 2022, he played Dhananjay Deshpande in Four More Shots Please! opposite Sayani Gupta.

In the 2023 Bejoy Nambiar's series Kaala, Mehra played an ex-army officer opposite Sreelekha Mitra. A critic of NDTV noted, "Rohan Mehra plays a steady hand amid the mayhem swirling around him."

Mehra then played a doctor in Shabbir Khan's 2024 direct to television release, Adbhut opposite Shreya Dhanwanthary. Bollywood Hungama stated that he delivered a "fine performance".

== Filmography ==
†	Denotes films that have not yet been released

=== Films ===
Year	Title	Role	Notes	Ref.
2015	Bajirao Mastani	—N/a	Assistant director	
2016	An Incomplete Tune	Siddharth Singh	Short film	
2018	Baazaar	Rizwan Ahmed		
2019	Hum	Vishal	Short film	
2021	420 IPC	Birbal Chaudhary		
2024	Adbhut	Dr. Aditya Rawat		

=== Web series ===
Year	Title	Role	Notes	Ref.
2022	Four More Shots Please!	Dhananjay Deshpande	Season 3	
2023	Kaala	Subhendu Mukherjee / Adinath Bagchi		

=== Other crew positions ===
Year	Title	Role	Notes
2013	Afterword	Director & writer	Short films
2019	Hum	Director & screenplay	Short films

== Awards and nominations ==
Year	Award	Category	Work	Result	Ref.
2019	Zee Cine Awards	Best Debut – Male	Baazaar	Nominated	
