= Prateik Smita Patil =

Indian actor (born 1986)

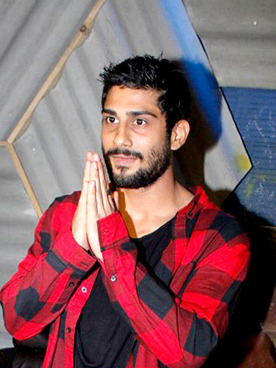
- Babbar in 2017
- Born: Prateik Babbar; 28 November 1986 (age 39); Mumbai, Maharashtra, India
- Occupation: Actor
- Years active: 2008–present
- Spouses: Sanya Sagar (m. 2019; div. 2023); Priya Banerjee (m. 2025)
- Parents: Raj Babbar (father); Smita Patil (mother)
- Relatives: See Babbar family

Prateik Smita Patil (born Prateik Babbar; 28 November 1986), is an Indian actor who predominantly appears in Hindi films. The son of late actress Smita Patil and former MP and actor Raj Babbar, he began his career as a production assistant before pursuing an acting career. Prior to his screen debut, Prateik appeared in television advertisements for a variety of products, including Nestle KitKat, on recommendation of the filmmaker Prahlad Kakkar. Since his debut in Bollywood, Patil has received accolades such as a Filmfare Award and a Stardust Award.

Patil made his screen debut with the 2008 coming of age drama Jaane Tu... Ya Jaane Na. He garnered nominations at various award ceremonies including the Filmfares, Screen Awards, and the Stardust Awards for best debut, winning the last of the three. Babbar played a variety of roles in 2011, appearing in commercially viable projects such as the crime thriller Dum Maaro Dum and the political drama Aarakshan, while drawing the attention of critics for his performances in independent films, including the drama Dhobi Ghat and the romantic comedy My Friend Pinto. Following a number of box-office failures, he had his biggest successes with the thriller Baaghi 2 (2018), the comedy Chhichhore (2019) and the action drama film Darbar (2020).

== Early life ==
Prateik was born on 28 November 1986 and is the son of the actor-politician Raj Babbar and the actress Smita Patil. His mother died due to complications in childbirth soon after Prateik was born. Prateik was raised by his maternal grandparents in Mumbai. He has said in interviews that he had a strained relationship with his father while growing up, as his father was "always busy with his other family". However, he also said that he and his father reconciled after Prateik grew into adulthood.

Prateik's stepmother is the actress Nadira Babbar and his paternal half-siblings are Arya Babbar and Juhi Babbar, also actors.

== Career ==
Prateik Babbar assisted advertisement filmmaker Prahlad Kakkar for a year as a production assistant. During this time Babbar was cast in advertisement films for several companies, including KitKat.

Prateik made his acting debut in the Aamir Khan production, Jaane Tu... Ya Jaane Na alongside Imran Khan and Genelia D'Souza. His portrayal of the annoying, attention-seeking brother of Genelia's character won him critical appreciation as well as numerous awards. At the 54th Filmfare Awards, Patil received a Special Jury certificate, as well as nominations for Best Male Debut and Best Supporting Actor. The film went on to become a major commercial success.

Following this initial success, he appeared in films that earned him little recognition. In 2011, Patil appeared in four films, the first of which was Kiran Rao's Dhobi Ghaat, which opened to positive reviews at film festivals worldwide. Patil also featured in the action-thriller Dum Maro Dum alongside Abhishek Bachchan and Rana Daggubati, and in the Prakash Jha-directed social drama Aarakshan with Amitabh Bachchan, Saif Ali Khan and Deepika Padukone. Also, in 2011, he acted opposite Kalki Koechlin in My Friend Pinto. His subsequent films include Ekk Deewana Tha and Issaq, both of which underperformed at the box office. In 2014, he made Bengali film debut in film titled Auroni Taukhon with Paoli Dam.

After gaining sobriety over substance abuse, he attended acting school taking up a course in method acting at the Jeff Goldberg Studio in 2016. Patil Babbar's first role after the course was in a short film entitled The Guitar. He made his feature film comeback with the comedy-drama Umrika, which opened at the 2015 Sundance Film Festival to a positive response. In 2017, he starred in a video titled "#DilSeAzaad", which highlighted the stigmas around addictions and addicts.

In 2018, he made a comeback with the film Baaghi 2, with Tiger Shroff in lead role, where Prateik for the first time portrayed an antagonist role as Sunny. He appeared in two more films; Anubhav Sinha's Mulk where he played Shahid Mohammed and Nitin Kakkar's Mitron.

In 2019, he appeared in a comedy-drama film, Chhichhore directed by Nitesh Tiwari and produced by Sajid Nadiadwala, a story of seven friends. He also appeared in the 2019 Tamil language action thriller film Darbar, written and directed by AR Murugadoss and produced by Allirajah Subaskaran starring Rajinikanth. The film was a major commercial success.

Patil later starred in Mumbai Saga (2021).

== Personal life ==
In 2011, during the filming of Ekk Deewana Tha, which is a remake of the Tamil-Telugu Bilingual film Vinnaithaandi Varuvaayaa/Ye Maaya Chesave, he began a relationship with Amy Jackson, a British actress. They broke up the following year.

Following a battle with substance abuse in 2013, a problem that Babbar had struggled with in the past, he went through rehab and counseling and has stayed sober since.

Babbar married film producer, Sanya Sagar, on 23 January 2019 after dating for quite a few years. The couple separated in 2020 and divorced in January 2023.

In January 2024, he got engaged to his girlfriend, actor Priya Banerjee. On 14 February 2025, they got married.

In March 2025, he changed his name from Prateik Patil Babbar to Prateik Smita Patil. Babbar stated that the reason behind this because his father was absent from his life.

== Filmography ==
=== Film ===
Key
†	Denotes films that have not yet been released

Year	Title	Role	Notes
2008	Jaane Tu... Ya Jaane Na	Amit Mahant	
2010	Dhobi Ghat	Zohaib "Munna" Shaikh	
2011	Dum Maaro Dum	Lawrence Gomes	
2011	Aarakshan	Sushant Seth	
2011	My Friend Pinto	Michael Pinto	
2012	Ekk Deewana Tha	Sachin Kulkarni	
2013	Issaq	Rahul Mishra	
2015	Umrika	Uday Rajkumar	
2017	Aroni Tokhon	Darshan Singh Mithaiwala	Bengali film
2018	Baaghi 2	Sunny Salgaonkar	
2018	Mulk	Shahid Mohammed	
2018	Mitron	Vikram Oberoi	
2019	Chhichhore	Raggie	
2019	Yaaram	Rohit Bajaj	
2020	Darbar	Ajay Malhotra	Tamil film
2021	The Power	Ranjeet Venkat Shankarnarayanan	
2021	Mumbai Saga	Arjun Rao	
2022	Bachchhan Paandey	Virgin	
2022	India Lockdown	Madhaw	
2022	Cobalt Blue	The paying guest (Note: Unnamed)	
2024	Khwaabon Ka Jhamela	Zubin Readymoney	
2025	Dhoom Dhaam	Arya	
2025	Sikandar	Arjun Pradhan	
2025	HIT: The Third Case	Alpha	Telugu film
2026	The Great Grand Superhero		

=== Television ===
Year	Title	Role	Notes
2014–2015	Box Cricket League 1	Contestant	
2016	Shockers	Karan	
2023	The Kapil Sharma Show	Guest	

=== Web series ===
Year	Title	Role	Platform	Notes
2019	Skyfire	Chandrashekhar	ZEE5	
2019–2025	Four More Shots Please!	Jeh Wadia	Amazon Prime Video	3 seasons
2021	Chakravyuh	Inspector Virkar	MX Original Series	1 Seasons
2021	Hiccups and Hookups	Akhil Rao	Lionsgate Play	

== Awards and nominations ==
Year	Film	Award	Category	Result	Ref.
2009	Jaane Tu... Ya Jaane Na	Filmfare Awards	Special Jury Award	Won	
2009	Jaane Tu... Ya Jaane Na	Filmfare Awards	Best Male Debut	Nominated	
2009	Jaane Tu... Ya Jaane Na	Filmfare Awards	Best Supporting Actor	Nominated	
2009	Jaane Tu... Ya Jaane Na	Screen Awards	Best Male Debut	Nominated	
2009	Jaane Tu... Ya Jaane Na	Stardust Awards	Breakthrough Performance – Male	Won	
2012	Dhobi Ghaat	Stardust Awards	Superstar of Tomorrow – Male	Nominated	
