= Rakhee Sandilya =

Indian writer and documentary filmmaker

Rakhee Sandilya is an Indian writer, and documentary filmmaker, who made her debut as a feature director with the film Ribbon (film).

== Career ==
She previously worked as an Assistant Director for the movie Main Aur Mr. Riight.

Sandilya studied in London and worked on various award-winning documentaries including ‘MY BABY NOT MINE’, ‘Heritage India’ and ‘Desi Folk’ for Epic Channel. Apart from movies, she has worked on many Television Commercials and corporate films.

In 2017, she co-wrote and directed Ribbon (film) that starred Kalki Koechlin and Sumeet Vyas.

== Filmography ==
Year	Film	Notes
2017	Ribbon (film)	As a Debut Director
2013	My Baby Not Mine	Documentary about Surrogate Mothers
	Heritage India	for Epic (TV channel)
	Desi Folk	Documentary
	Deadline	For EROS NOW
