= Kubbra Sait =

Indian actress and model (born 1983)

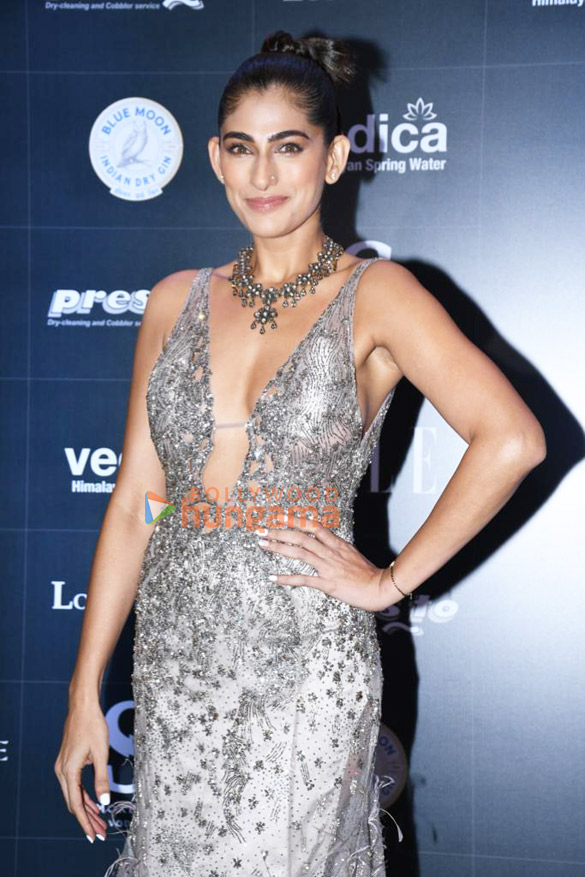
- Kubbra in 2023
- Born: 27 July 1983 (age 43); Bangalore, Karnataka, India
- Occupations: Actress; TV host; Model
- Years active: 2010–present
- Relatives: Azeez Sait (grandfather); Tanveer Sait (uncle); Danish Sait (brother)
- Website: kubbrasait.com

Kubbra Sait (born 27 July 1983) is an Indian actress, TV presenter and model. She gained widespread recognition for her performance as Kukoo on the first season of the Netflix original show Sacred Games (2018) and as Phara Keaen in the Apple TV+ show Foundation.

Sait has appeared in Hindi films such as Ready (2011), Sultan (2016), Gully Boy (2019), Deva (2025) and Son of Sardaar 2 (2025). Her roles in television include TVF Tripling (2016) as Sheetal on ZEE5/SonyLIV; RejctX (2019) as Anushka and The Verdict - State vs Nanavati (2019) as Mamie Ahuja on ZEE5; Farzi (2023) as Saira and Shehar Lakhot (2023) as Pallavi Raj on Amazon Prime Video; and The Trial (2023) as Sana on Disney+ Hotstar.

== Early life ==
Kubbra Sait was born on 27 July 1983 in Bangalore, Karnataka. Her parents are Zakariah Sait and Yasmin Sait. Her mother is from Mysore and father from Ooty. Her younger brother Danish Sait is a radio jockey and television host. Her uncle Tanveer Sait is a politician. Her grandfather Azeez Sait was a minister in Karnataka.

== Career ==
She started hosting shows when she was about thirteen years old. In 2005, she moved to Dubai after her graduation from National Institute of Information & Management Sciences, Bangalore with a degree in Finance and Marketing. Sait started her career as an accounts manager with Microsoft in Dubai, working at the company for three years before pursuing her career in the entertainment industry. She debuted in films with a minor role in the first Emirati feature film City of Life in 2009 and made her debut in Hindi cinema with a supporting role the 2011 Anees Bazmee film Ready, starring alongside Salman Khan and Asin. She continued with supporting roles in Hindi cinema with the films Jodi Breakers (2012), I Love NY (2015) by Radhika Rao and Vinay Sapru, Sultan (2016) by Ali Abbas Zafar again alongside Khan, Gully Boy (2019) by Zoya Akhtar, the Netflix film Dolly Kitty Aur Woh Chamakte Sitare (2019) by Alankrita Shrivastava; Jawaani Jaaneman (2020) by Nitin Kakkar, RK/RKay by Rajat Kapoor, Khwaabon Ka Jhamela by Danish Aslam, Deva (2025) by Rosshan Andrrews starring Shahid Kapoor and Son of Sardaar 2 by Vijay Kumar Arora.

In television she started with hosting Stars Ka Tadka (2011), a celebrity food show on Food Food, and Ring Ka King (2012), an Indian professional wrestling tournament. Sait's first television role was in the web series TVF Tripling (2016), created by The Viral Fever for ZEE5/SonyLIV. She then appeared in the web series Going Viral Pvt. Ltd. (2017) on Amazon Prime Video and Fourplay (2018) on Alt Balaji. Sait's breakthrough came with her role of a transgender woman named Kukoo in the Netflix show Sacred Games for which she received critical acclaim. The Netflix original was nominated under the Best Drama category at the 47th International Emmy Awards. Sait represented Sacred Games at the Emmy Awards, held on 25 November 2019. She won the Gold Award for Best Actress in a Supporting Role (OTT) for her role as Kukoo.

Sait in 2023

She continued appearing in web series including RejctX (2019) and The Verdict – State vs Nanavati (2019) on ZEE5, the latter a miniseries based on the infamous 1959 Indian court case K. M. Nanavati v. State of Maharashtra; Illegal - Justice, Out of Order (2020) on JioCinema; Farzi (2023) on Amazon Prime Video alongside Shahid Kapoor; The Trial (2023), an Indian adaptation of The Good Wife; and the Amazon Prime Video series Shehar Lakhot (2023) for which she won the Filmfare OTT Award for Best Supporting Actress - Drama for her role of Pallavi Raj.

She portrayed Phara Keaen in the Apple TV+ series Foundation, an adaptation of Isaac Asimov's classic science-fiction book series of the same name.

She participated in the reality television show Rise and Fall in 2025.

== Personal life ==
Sait in 2019

In 2022, Sait published her memoir, Open Book: Not Quite A Memoir, through HarperCollins India. In the book, she recounted experiencing sexual abuse over several years. She later revealed that she had initially been too frightened to speak about the abuse and that writing about her experiences had helped her begin the healing process.

Sait comes from a Muslim background, but has described religion as something that was not enforced in her family while growing up. Speaking about her religious practices in 2023, she revealed that she began offering namaz around two years ago and had since been doing so regularly. Also in 2023, she observed her first Ramadan fasts as an adult.

In October 2026, Sait revealed that she is in a relationship with banker Gautam Dhaliwal, whom she met on a dating app.

== Filmography ==
=== Films ===
Year	Title	Role	Notes	Ref.
2009	City of Life	Bollywood Fantasy Starlet		
2011	Ready	Sunaina		
2012	Jodi Breakers	Vinita		
2015	I Love NY	Vidya Saxena		
2016	Sultan	Herself (commentator)		
2019	Gully Boy	Scarlett		
2020	Jawaani Jaaneman	Rhea		
2020	Dolly Kitty Aur Woh Chamakte Sitare	Shazia		
2022	RK/RKay	Seema		
2024	Khwaabon Ka Jhamela	Shehnaaz		
2025	Deva	Dipti Singh		
2025	Son of Sardaar 2	Mehwish		
2026	Hai Jawani Toh Ishq Hona Hai	Dr. Smita		

=== Web series ===
Year	Title	Role	Platform	Notes	Ref.
2017	Going Viral Pvt. Ltd.	Natasha	Amazon Prime Video	8 episodes	
2018	Fourplay	Brinda	ALTBalaji	6 episodes	
2018	Sacred Games	Kukoo	Netflix	7 episodes	
2019	TVF Tripling	Sheetal	TVF; SonyLIV	3 episodes	
2019	RejctX	Anushka	ZEE5	10 episodes	
2019	The Verdict - State vs Nanavati	Mamie Ahuja	ALTBalaji; ZEE5	10 episodes	
2020	Illegal	Meher Salam	Voot	10 episodes	
2020	Waqalat From Home	Rajini Tacker	Amazon Prime Video	10 episodes	
2021	Foundation	Phara Keaen	Apple TV+	Season 1	
2022	Murder in Agonda	Waheeda	Amazon Prime Video		
2023	Farzi	Saira	Amazon Prime Video		
2023	The Trial	Sana	Disney+ Hotstar		
2023	Shehar Lakhot	Pallavi Raj	Amazon Prime Video		
2025	Rise and Fall	Contestant	MX Player	11th place	
2026	Sankalp	DCP Parveen Sheikh	MX Player	10 episodes	
