= Stupid Man, Smart Phone (Indian TV series) =

Indian adventure reality show

- Based on: British reality show, Stupid Man, Smart Phone
- Starring: Sumeet Vyas; Evelyn Sharma; Karan Kundrra; Sahil Khattar
- Country of origin: India
- Original language: Hindi
- No. of seasons: 1

Production
- Editor: Mahesh Ghanekar

Original release
- Release: 20 September 2017

Stupid Man Smart Phone is a 2017 adventure reality streaming television series produced by Voot and hosted by Sumeet Vyas. It premiered on Voot on 20 September 2017. It is an official Indian adaptation of a BBC Worldwide show by the same name.

== Cast ==
=== Main cast ===
- Sumeet Vyas
- Evelyn Sharma
- Karan Kundrra
- Sahil Khattar

== Reception ==
=== Critical reviews ===
Letty Mariam Abraham of Mid-Day gave 2.5 stars and wrote "Watch the show for Vyas and his quirky remarks; the rest offers nothing new."

Rajat Tripathi of Bollywood Life wrote "Beautiful locations, crisp editing, adventurous tasks make for a near perfect reality show only failed by the poor execution of the concept. Do check out the show if your are a Sumeet Vyas fan...you haven't seen this raw and real side of the talented actor."

Almas Khateeb of The Quint praises the editing, saying "Another thing that deserves a mention is the camera work on the show. The shots that pan into the wilderness are amazing and provide an immersive experience."
