= Sanaya Pithawalla =

Indian model and actress (born 1993)

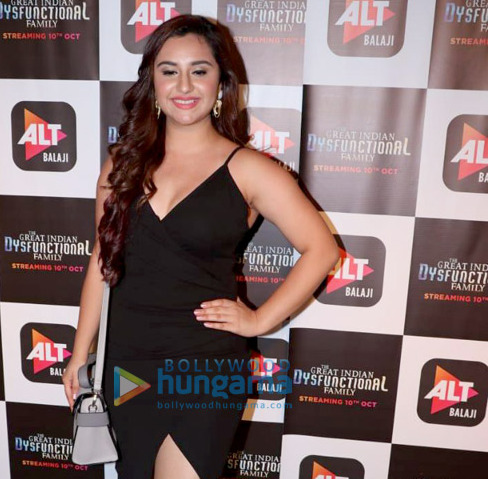
- Born: 4 October 1993 (age 32)
- Occupation: Actress
- Years active: 2015-present

Sanaya Pithawalla (born 4 August 1993) is an Indian model and actress. She is best known for her roles as Siyali Rajput in MTV's Warrior High (2015) and Aditi Ranaut in the Hindi web series The Great Indian Dysfunctional Family (2018). Her upcoming project with ALTBalaji is Dil Hi Toh Hai season 2. Recently she was seen opposite Anshuman Malhotra in Voot's Fuh Se Fnatasy.

== Early life ==
Sanaya Pithawalla did her schooling at St.Anthony's Girls' High School, Chembur, Mumbai. She started her modelling career at an early age. She started her career with the role of Siyali Rajput in Warriors High. Later she acted in the Indian television series Emotional Atyachar season 4 and Gumrah.

== Filmography ==
Year	Show	Role	Language	Notes	Ref(s)
2015	Warrior High	Siyali Rajput	Hindi	Debut	
2015	Emotional Atyachar		Hindi		
2018	The Great Indian Dysfunctional Family	Aditi Ranaut	Hindi		
2019	Fuh Se Fantasy	Sudha	Hindi		
2019-2020	Dil Hi Toh Hai	Shanaya Noon	Hindi		
