= Asur (TV series) =

2020 Hindi-language Indian mystery web series

- Genre: Crime; Psychological thriller
- Created by: Gaurav Shukla; Vibhav Shikdar
- Developed by: Ding Entertainment
- Written by: Gaurav Shukla; Niren Bhatt; Abhijeet Khuman; Chirag Salian; Abhishek Garg
- Directed by: Oni Sen (S1 & S2); Gaurav Shukla (S3)
- Starring: Arshad Warsi; Barun Sobti; Vishesh Bansal; Gaurav Arora; Anupriya Goenka; Riddhi Dogra; Amey Wagh; Sharib Hashmi; Meiyang Chang; Abhishek Chauhan
- Theme music composer: Dharam Bhatt
- Country of origin: India
- Original language: Hindi
- No. of seasons: 2
- No. of episodes: 16

Production
- Producers: Sejal Shah (S2); Bhavesh Mandalia (S2); Gaurav Shukla (S2)
- Cinematography: Sayak Bhattacharya
- Editors: Shadab Khan; Charu Takkar
- Camera setup: Multi-camera
- Running time: 34–66 minutes
- Production company: Ding Entertainment (season 1)

Original release
- Network: Voot (season 1); JioCinema (season 2)
- Release: 2 March 2020 – 7 June 2023

Asur (pronounced [ə.sʊɾ], Sanskrit: असुर, transl. Demon) is an Indian Hindi-language psychological crime thriller streaming television series. The first season was produced by Tanveer Bookwala and aired on Voot while the second season, produced by Bombay Fables, Sejal Shah, Bhavesh Mandalia, and Gaurav Shukla aired on JioCinema. The first season premiered on 2 March 2020 and the second season premiered on 1 June 2023. A third season has gone on floors in September 2026, and is set to wrap up in December 2026.

The series is about a team of forensic experts who must catch a serial killer who considers himself the incarnation of the asura Kali. Arshad Warsi and Barun Sobti star, alongside Anupriya Goenka, Riddhi Dogra, and Amey Wagh. Sharib Hashmi had a starring role in the first season, while Meiyang Chang and Abhishek Chauhan joined the main cast in the second season. Ahsaas Channa, Sandeepa Dhar and Shweta Basu Prasad joined the cast in the third season.

== Premise ==
Set against the backdrop of the mystical city of Varanasi, Asur follows Nikhil Nair, a forensic-expert-turned-teacher, who returns to his roots at the Central Bureau of Investigation, and along with his former mentor Dhananjay Rajpoot, finds himself caught in a cat and mouse game with a brutal serial killer.

== Cast and characters ==
Characters	Actors	Seasons	
Characters	Actors	1	2
Dhananjay Rajpoot "DJ"	Arshad Warsi	Main	Main
Nikhil Nair	Barun Sobti	Main	Main
Nusrat "Nus" Saeed	Ridhi Dogra	Main	Main
Naina Nair	Anupriya Goenka	Main	Main
Shubh Joshi (young)	Vishesh Bansal	Main	Main
Lolark Dubey	Sharib Hashmi	Main	
Rasool Shaikh/Balbir Subeir	Amey Wagh	Main	Main
Shashank Awasthi	Pawan Chopra	Main	Main
Kesar Bhardawaj/Mukund Agnihotri	Gaurav Arora	Main	Main
Shubh Joshi (adult)	Abhishek Chauhan		Main
Paul	Meiyang Chang		Main
Ishani Chaudhary	Adithi Kalkunte		Main
Raina Singh	Anvita Sudarshan	Recurring	Recurring
Samarth Ahuja	Nishank Verma	Recurring	Recurring
Aditya Jalan	Archak Chhabra	Recurring	Recurring
Neelkanth Joshi	Deepak Qazir	Recurring	Recurring
Shalini	Anurita Jha		Recurring
Jagdish Munda	Amit Anand Raut		Recurring
Vrinda Srivastav	Barkha Bisht Sengupta		Recurring
Moksh	Aditya Lal	Guest	Guest
Ankit Sharma	Bondip Sarma	Guest	Guest
Radhacharan Joshi	Jayant Raina	Guest	Guest
Lolark's Wife	Sunayna Baile	Guest	
Sajid Sheikh	Jay Zaveri	Guest	Guest
Anant	Atharva vishwakarma	Guest	Guest
Michelle	Suzanne Bernert		Guest

== Episodes ==
Series	Title	Episodes	Originally released		Network
Series	Title	Episodes	First released	Last released	Network
1	Asur: Welcome to Your Dark Side	8	2 March 2020		Voot
2	Asur 2: The Rise of the Dark Side	8	1 June 2023	7 June 2023	JioCinema

=== Season 1 (2020) ===
No.	Title	Directed by	Written by	Original release date
1	"The Dead Can Talk"	Oni Sen	Gaurav Shukla	2 March 2020
Opening in a flashback scene, it is shown that a young boy kills his father by poisioning. Presently, Forensic expert Nikhil Nair is a teacher of forensic science at the FBI in the US. He lives with his wife Naina and daughter Riya. Nikhil is not happy in teaching. He misses his days back in the CBI in India. For quite sometime, Nikhil has been receiving some coordinates from an unknown and he forwards it to his friend Lolark Dubey in the CBI. Later, bodies are found on these coordinates. Nikhil leaves for India and returns to the CBI after a five-year hiatus. He is assigned to a case involving serial killing of people in place of Dhananjay Rajput. Shockingly, the latest victim is the wife of his old mentor/teacher, Dhananjay Rajput DJ (with whom he had parted ways in the past due to some ethical issues). Suspicion for latest murder turns out to DJ himself.
2	"Rabbit Hole"	Oni Sen	Gaurav Shukla	2 March 2020
In flashback, the boy was insulted as an Asur(demon), rakshas by his father. The boy's mother died when he was born but he has extraordinary intelligence. He learns anything by just reading it once. Presently, Sandhya's murderer lal thanjana is also murdered in Dimapur, Nagaland. Based on circumstantial evidence provided by Nikhil and cyber expert Rasool DJ is arrested for murdering lal and setting up murder of Sandhya.
3	"Peek-a-boo"	Oni Sen	Gaurav Shukla	2 March 2020
The episode starts with a flashback to 18 years ago, when the young boy's grandfather takes him to a psychologist for counselling and gets informed that he is a special kid but he shouldn't be verbally or physically abused, given that calling him an "Asur" will mold his personality in a similar way. In the present day, DJ gets jailed and Nikhil receives three coordinates relating to three different murders. Nikhil and the CBI team tracks down the murders to Kolkata, Gurugram and Delhi. The man who was murdered in Kolkata was found to be dead because of Carbon monoxide poisoning in his car, the Gurugram location turns out to be a cemetery while the Delhi location is the shop of a coffin maker. Upon further investigation, Nikhil discovers that the owner of the shop, George is missing and has only 9 hours to live. He is found to be in the trunk of an abandoned car and the Nikhil realizes that there is a victim buried alive, inside one of the coffins in the cemetery and has only 45 minutes to live. Meanwhile, DJ deduces that the killer has a personal vendetta against them and that Nikhil is walking into a trap. He tries to warn Nikhil about it but Nikhil gets kidnapped when the CBI team finds the coffin and upon digging it up, the coffin releases incapacitating gas and shurikens. The killer walks out of the coffin and kidnaps Nikhil.
4	"Ashes from the Past"	Oni Sen	Gaurav Shukla	2 March 2020
In the flashbacks to 10 years ago, the boy, Shubh and his father perform the ceremonial rites for DJ's grandfather's funeral, on the day that Shubh murders his father. DJ sees the retrieved body, and concludes that he was poisoned. DJ notices the erratic behavior exhibited by Shubh upon seeing his father's body, and has his suspicions raised. In the present day, Nikhil wakes up captive in Shubh's lair and he is blackmailed into working with Shubh to kill his next victim, a neurobiologist, Dr. Abhilasha Chandran, in lieu of Nikhil's family's safety. Nikhil reluctantly agrees and gives Shubh the idea for the murder, when questioned about the methodology and the specifics. In the meantime, DJ has been working on the case with access to older case files and later realizes that Shubh's name isn't in any case file given that he was a minor 10 years ago. He is approached by Nusrat and Lolarkh regarding the body of Dr. Chandran found in a lake. The trio travel to the site of the lake and upon DJ examining the body, realizes that Nikhil is alive but that he was the one who plotted the murder of the victim, who's trying to send a message to DJ.
5	"The Devil Has a Face"	Oni Sen	Gaurav Shukla	2 March 2020
Shubh escapes from the CBI and goes on a killing spree. Nikhil and DJ race against time to stop him before he strikes again.
6	"The Firewall"	Oni Sen	Gaurav Shukla	2 March 2020
Lolark uncovers Shubh's dark past tied to the devil's birth. Dhananjay hacks into the NIC firewall, identifying Jalan as the next target. Despite their efforts, Jalan is killed during an engagement party, mirroring the killer's method.
7	"Let There be Darkness"	Oni Sen	Gaurav Shukla	2 March 2020
Dhananjay discovers a common factor among the victims and seeks Kesar's assistance. He prepares himself to confront the killer, prompting Naina to manipulate the NIC database. Meanwhile, Nikhil suspects Shubh as the kidnapper but is unable to communicate with him directly.
8	"End is The Beginning"	Oni Sen	Gaurav Shukla	2 March 2020
Nikhil discovers DJ framed evidence to send Shubh to prison, leading to Nikhil's resignation. Nikhil is assigned DJ as the next victim, and DJ plans to trap the killer in jail, but DJ ends up capturing the killer instead. Meanwhile, the discovery of multiple Shubhs and Kesar being the mastermind is made, and captives including journalists and preachers face a life-threatening situation.

=== Season 2 (2023) ===
No.	Title	Directed by	Written by	Original release date
1	"The Dance of Death"	Oni Sen	Gaurav Shukla	1 June 2023
A flashback 16 years ago shows Shubh preaching to three followers and killing one of them as he was "no longer needed in this journey". Dhananjay Rajpoot (DJ) is at a monastery in Dharamshala, struggling with his guilt at being responsible for so many deaths. Naina traces DJ and tries to enlist his help finding Swati, her daughter's killer. CBI chief Shashank Awasthi faces judicial pressure while trying to retain custody of Kesar Bhardawaj, who warns Awasthi that the apocalypse is coming. Ishani Chaudhary, a new CBI officer, has suspicions about Rasool Shaikh. Nikhil Nair is haunted by his decision, while being hailed a hero by the media for sacrificing his daughter to save three social workers. He receives new GPS coordinates that lead the CBI to an ice factory and another masked dead body. Naina pushes Nikhil to sign divorce papers. Rasool collaborates with a group in Dhaka to hack India's digital networks. The CBI team rushes to prevent a triple murder as The Asur chillingly broadcasts the event live. Nusrat completes Shubh's age progression. Rasool folds his hands in reverence as the Asur appears on the telecast as a shadow outline.
2	"The Past, the Present and the Future"	Oni Sen	Gaurav Shukla	1 June 2023
The flashback takes us 16 years back to Prayagraj. A teenaged Shubh challenges an elderly pandit in a theological debate, easily defeating the latter. Shubh's main argument is that self-sacrifice is a sin and insult to life itself. The impressed pandit invites Shubh to join his matha in Haridwar. He temporarily parts ways with his two followers, telling them to keep their goal in mind at all times. Amid media frenzy over the triple murders, Nikhil & Nusrat look into the dead bodies for clues. They visit Kesar in jail to ask about a watch piece they found in one of the corpses. Kesar taunts them saying "you still can't see what is right in front of you." Ishani continues to investigate Rasool. Naina and Nikhil's differences continue to grow. DJ and Naina pay a cold blooded visit to an unrepentant Swati who is hiding out in Shimla. DJ speaks with the Asur using Swati's phone and declares war. Naina insists on assisting him with this 'digital war'. In Dharamsala, a wise teenaged monk who had earlier counselled DJ, revives a fainted monk by touching his forehead. DJ travels to Varanasi to trace Shubh's steps after he escaped a jail fire with three other inmates, eventually learning that two of them are now dead; one of them was the kidnapper who had taken Nikhil hostage. The third one's name was Balveer Suber. The CBI team follows a lead to a suspect involved in the triple murder. He is long gone, and Nikhil is shocked to find his daughter's drawings in the suspect's home. A hidden message includes new coordinates.
3	"Burning the Forest"	Oni Sen	Gaurav Shukla	2 June 2023
The flashback sequence is from 12 years ago in Trilok dham, Haridwar. Shubh tends to the ailing pandit who tells him the matha is in danger. He wants Shubh to assume the responsibilities of running the monastery and fulfil his duty. Shubh refuses saying this monastery was just a stage of his life and his duty is to the entire world. The old man dies, seemingly from poison. We then see newspaper clippings about contaminated water killing 22 people at the ashram. The CBI team finds another body, dumped in a lake. In Kullu, the young monk Anant urgently stops a bus right before an avalanche, with the media dubbing him 'miracle boy' and social media posts calling him 'the saviour'. Paul (Meiyang Chang) arrives at the CBI office to take over the Asur case, much to the dismay of the team. When Kesar is released on bail, Paul asks Nusrat to fabricate evidence in the latest lake murder's report to implicate Kesar. DJ and Naina watch Kesar's portal and find a code probably being used by Asur cult members to communicate. DJ continues retracing Shubh's journey after the jail fire escape, from Prayagraj to Haridwar to Delhi where he meets a sculptor, Vrinda (Barkha Bisht Sengupta). She is blind and likens Shubh to Krishna and herself to a gopi. When DJ tells her what Shubh really is, she goes into denial and tells him to leave. DJ steals a book signed by Shubh while leaving her house. Finding an inscription on the book, Naina decodes the portal messages which refer to the next attack being on 'Ashwini Nakshatra'. Despite DJ's veto, Naina tips of CBI chief Awasthi anonymously about the forthcoming attack. Ishani shares her suspicions about Rasool with Nikhil, who initially advises her to never ignore her instincts. Surveilling Rasool, Ishani finds pictures & videos of herself on a pen drive in his apartment. When she shows these to Nikhil, he is noncommittal and asks her to focus on preventing the Ashwini Nakshatra attack. Meanwhile, she convinces a colleague to conduct a ballstics analysis on Lolark Dubey's death, off the record. While snooping on Rasool outside his residence, Ishani is captured. An unknown woman watches her as she is bound and gagged, with a noose around her neck. Nikhil insists on conducting Swati's autopsy and realizes this was DJ's work. Confronting DJ, Nikhil warns him not to turn into another Asur. DJ says he is unlike Asur but will go to any length ("burn down the forest") to kill the monster he created (when he falsified evidence to put teenaged Shubh in jail for murdering his father). Rasool alerts the cult about the CBI's awareness of the attack. All guest visitors are locked out of the portal, requiring facial recognition for sign-in. DJ enlists a former RAW agent, Ranvijay, to nab Kesar. Despite Paul's 24-house surveillance on Kesar, he evades the CBI team but is captured by masked men who bring him to DJ.
4	"Designing the future"	Oni Sen	Gaurav Shukla	3 June 2023
The episode begins with a flashback to Prayagraj, 12 years ago. At a library, Shubh overhears some scientists reaching a dead end while talking about neural networking. Shubh catches the attention of the lead scientist by sharing his knowledge and insight. While discussing human nature which the scientist finds unfathomable, Shubh says all humans are lowly, selfish and cruel, but no one wants to admit it. He also says that a predictive model can only be built when the past and the present are taken into consideration - just Lord Brahma viewed time in its stationary state. Impressed by his unconventional views, the scientist invites Shubh to join their research program on artificial intelligence. When asked by Shubh what he would do if he could see the future, the scientist says he'd prevent his assistant's suicice a few days ago. Unbeknownst to the scientist, one of Shubh's accomplishes had killed the assistant. Ishani meets her end after Rasool shows her his true colours over a video call. Recalling Ishani's suspicions, Nikhil lashes out at Rasool, who is cool under questioning. DJ & Naina use the captured Kesar's face to gain access to the portal, but are flooded with hundreds of hits. Kesar mocks DJ saying he'll never be able to stop the Asur's great deeds. The Asur hacks into DJ's control center and reveals his next victim. Anant helps find a missing boy, reinforcing media interest in his miracles. In an interview he urges people to help each other to end their struggles. DJ convinces Vrinda to help him understand Shubh, but the only helpful information she has is that Shubh met a professor and he was excited about the future. Nikhil's suspicions about Rasool reach DJ who is furious, because he considered Lolark his brother. His team digs deeper into Rasool's past, eventually finding DNA proof that Rasool is actually Balveer Suber, the third surviving accomplice who escapaed the jail fire with Shubh. The lake murder victim is identified as Shalini who was a coder. Her laptop has analytical algorithms typically used in AI; Nikhil enlists Naina's help in understanding them. The ballistic analysis Ishani ordered proves Rasool was lying about Lolark's death. DJ reaches out to the ATF taskforce with the DNA proof. Rasool goes underground and apologizes to a disappointed Asur for impulsively getting Ishani killed. Rasool calls DJ to taunt him and challenges him to save his favourite prodigy. A mysterious man (Asur?) delivers a package at the RBI, following which the RBI Governor resigns. Nusrat is lured to her car by a phone call about her mother's health, and is incapacitated by Ishani's murderer.
5	"The countdown begins"	Oni Sen	Gaurav Shukla	4 June 2023
Flashback: 10 years ago in Prayagraj, a young Kesar Bharadwaj, whose real name is Mukund Agnihotri, is heartbroken after his wife dies due to the drunk driving of a minister's son. He is thrashed by cops who threaten him to withdraw his case from the court. Defeated, he attempts to shoot himself but finds the gun empty. Shubh calls him at that moment encouraging him by saying he is not dead because his life's purpose has not been fulfilled. He was born to spread light amongst the oppressed. Shubh blows up the perpetrators' house while Mukund watches on video call and tells Mukund his death is mortgaged with him until his new life as Kesar Bharadwaj has served its purpose. The ATF team searches Nusrat's car for clues; Nikhil finds sand in the backseat. Rasool's credit card statement leads them to an underground control center in an abandoned dumpyard in Delhi. Their arrival alerts Rasool who initiates a file transfer. They call in Naina who manages to halt the transfer. The Asur calls Rasool, telling him to fix this fiasco he created and that "the ritual requires a great sacrifice". Rasool makes a conference call to the ATF team and DJ's team, offering Nusrat in exchange for Kesar and access to the file transfer. DJ is unwilling to budge despite caring for Nusrat, but Naina gives in to the demand. Nikhil learns of Naina's involvement in Swati's death and is horrified, but she has no regrets. CBI chief Awasthi tells Paul this case is indeed personal, and urges him and DJ to work together. However, Paul intends to arrest DJ after the exchange is over. The data Naina reviewed has a keyword appearing frequently - Ashwatthama. She also finds additional clues using the links from the portal they had accessed earlier. Combined with a lead Nikhil found from the soil in Nusrat's car, they manage to pinpoint the location she is being held. Nikhil rushes to save her. Nusrat's abductor forces her to choose between saving the life of an innocent stranger, and that of her sister who killed two innocent people while driving drunk. Crying, Nusrat chooses her sister and watches the innocent girl die. Nikhil arrives and captures the abductor. At the hostage exchange point, Rasool asks Naina to destroy all the hard drives as the data has been transferred; she manages to swap one of them and destroys a fake. Kesar is released and approaches Rasool; as soon as Nikhil conveys Nusrat's safety, DJ shoots Kesar coldly in the head. Rasool shoots himself as the Asur watches remotely. We finally see his face.
6	"The Domino Effect"	Oni Sen	Gaurav Shukla	5 June 2023
Shubh's plan is in motion, and the dominoes are starting to fall. The artificial intelligence is spreading, and people are starting to turn on each other. Nikhil and Dhananjay are fighting a losing battle, and it seems like Shubh is about to win.
7	"Birth of the New God"	Oni Sen	Gaurav Shukla	6 June 2023
Shubh's plan has succeeded, and he has created a new world order. He is now the most powerful being on Earth, and he is worshipped by his followers as a god. Nikhil and Dhananjay are the only ones who can stop him, but they are now on the run, and they are being hunted by Shubh's forces.
8	"The God's Dilemma"	Oni Sen	Gaurav Shukla	7 June 2023
Nikhil and Dhananjay have finally found a way to stop Shubh, but it comes at a high cost. They must make a choice that will determine the fate of the world.

== Reception ==
=== Season 1 ===
Pratishruti Ganguly of Firstpost gave the series 3.5 out of 5, writing, "With each passing episode, the concept of heroism corrodes to reveal the frailty and malleability of our protagonists. In an age of ultra-heroism of the police (the Rohit Shetty extended cop universe), where heroes are positioned as serial do-gooders, it is refreshing to see a narrative that questions the very basis of morality." Ruchi Kaushal of Hindustan Times reviewed the first two episodes and called the series a "mix of CID, Crime Patrol, and Sacred Games", she further wrote that "the web show doesn’t disappoint and performs well in the first two episodes."

Conversely, Tanisha Bagchi of The Quint gave the film 2 out of 5, writing, "From mythology, revenge, redemption, karma, to mystery, murder and human psychology, Asur tries to combine different aspects but gets entangled in its own web. Long monologues about tales of demons and gods, destiny and other philosophies take away the sense of urgency from the show."

=== Season 2 ===
Prateek Sur of Outlook India gave the series 4 out of 5, writing, "‘Asur 2’ very beautifully amalgamates the myths into a current-day geo-political scenario in India. Not for a moment in the show would you feel what they’re showing is so fictional that it can’t happen in today’s times. Its believability is what makes the mythological aspects come alive. The performances are decent. And it’s thrilling till the very last shot of the show. If you’re into thrillers or even just fans of mythology or historical fiction, you’ll definitely love this to the core. It’s a definite Must Watch. I am going with 4 stars." Shweta Keshri of India Today gave the second season 3 out of 5 and opined that "Season 2 has less of an impact. Season 1 was much more gripping, as the new installment seemed dragged in parts."

== See also ==
- List of web series
