= Fourplay (TV series) =

- Genre: Comedy
- Created by: Ekta Kapoor
- Developed by: Ekta Kapoor
- Directed by: Vandana
- Starring: Rajesh Khattar; Vandana Sajnani; Gaurav Chopra; Kashmera Shah; Kubbra Sait
- Country of origin: India
- Original languages: Hindi; English
- No. of seasons: 1
- No. of episodes: 6

Production
- Producers: Ekta Kapoor; Shobha Kapoor
- Production locations: Mumbai, India
- Camera setup: Multi-camera
- Running time: 15-18 minutes
- Production company: Balaji Telefilms

Original release
- Network: ALT Balaji
- Release: 15 January 2018

Fourplay is a 2018 Hindi short web series, created by Ekta Kapoor for her video on demand platform ALTBalaji. The web series is about the sexual life of two couples that takes an ugly turn when someone's letter reaches into their lives leading to misunderstandings and small fights.

The series is available for streaming on the ALT Balaji app and its associated websites since its release date.

== Plot ==
The series revolves around two upper class married couples Pooja-Raj and Brinda-Bobby whose married lives take a twist when a love letter intended for Brinda ends up in Pooja's house.

== Cast ==
- Rajesh Khattar
- Vandana Sajnani
- Gaurav Chopra
- Kashmera Shah
- Kubbra Sait
- Nitin Mirani

== List of episodes ==
- Episode 1: An Erotic Document
- Episode 2: The Contact Point
- Episode 3: Threesome
- Episode 4: The Break-up
- Episode 5: The Young Thingy
- Episode 6: Season Finale: The Climax
