= Eduruleni Manishi (2001 film) =

2001 film by D. Siva Prasad Reddy

- DVD cover
- Directed by: Jonnalagadda Srinivasa Rao
- Written by: Marudhuri Raja (dialogues)
- Screenplay by: Bhupathi Raja
- Story by: Bhupathi Raja
- Produced by: D. Sivaprasad Reddy
- Starring: Nagarjuna Akkineni; Soundarya; Shenaz Treasurywala
- Cinematography: Chota K. Naidu
- Edited by: Kola Bhaskar
- Music by: S. A. Rajkumar
- Production company: Kamakshi Movies
- Release date: 30 March 2001
- Running time: 143 mins
- Country: India
- Language: Telugu

Eduruleni Manishi (transl. The Unopposed Man) is a 2001 Indian Telugu-language action drama film produced by D. Siva Prasad Reddy under the Kamakshi Movies banner and directed by Jonnalagadda Srinivasa Rao. It stars Nagarjuna Akkineni, Soundarya and Shenaz Treasurywala, with music composed by S.A. Rajkumar.It was dubbed into Hindi as Pandit Ek Yodha and into Tamil as Rudhiran.

== Plot ==
Surya Murthy is the head of a village where he is highly respected by the entire village, except for the troublemaking Nazar. Surya Murthy stays with his grandfather and grandmother and a 6-year-old girl Rani. He has a younger look-alike brother Satyamurthy, aka Sathya in Hyderabad completing his engineering in computer science. Satya has a non-Telugu-speaking girlfriend Sri. Satya has a worrying factor now. His elder brother Surya Murthy has decided not to marry in his life. Hence, Satya starts looking for a suitable bride for his elder brother. There he meets Vasundhara at a temple and decides that she is the right choice for his elder brother. He approaches Vasundhara and asks her hand for marrying his elder brother. Later on, Vasundhara happens to observe the heroism and goodness in Surya Murthy when he comes to Hyderabad to meet Satya. Later on, Vasundhara learns that Surya Murthy and Satya are the younger brothers of the man who married her elder sister Bhavani. She tells Vasundhara that Surya Murthy played a villain role in their life and he was instrumental in her husband dying after prolonged boozing due to the compounding problems. She also tells that after her husband's demise, Surya Murthy forcibly took away her daughter Rani. After learning of her elder sister's flashback, Vasundhara decides to take revenge by marrying Surya Murthy and then slowly destroy the entire family. She accepts the proposal of Satya to marry his brother Surya Murthy. Then they start doing a drama by making Vasundhara stay in the village of Satya and creating situations where Vasundhara saves Rani from the perils. After the repetitive requests from his family members and Rani, Surya Murthy marries Vasundhara. The first step of Vasundhara after marriage was to postpone the first night by 22 days by bribing the priest. Then she transfers the money and jewelry to his sister's house with the help of a petty thief. But that thief runs away without giving jewelry to her sister and gets caught by the police. Meantime, Satya realizes the intentions of his sister-in-law Vasundhara and explains her the flashback of Rani and tells her that it was Bhavani who was a characterless lady. By the time Vasundhara realizes the fault in her, the thief was presented in the house of Surya Murthy and was interrogated as to who gave him jewelry. To save his sister-in-law, Satya behaves in a strange manner and tells Surya Murthy that he wants his partnership in the property. He says that he stole the jewelry and wants the thief to sell it so he can start his software business. With that incident, the brothers split. The rest of the film is about how the brothers get united and decimate the villain gang.

== Cast ==
- Nagarjuna Akkineni as (dual role)
  - Surya Murthy; Satya's brother; Vasundhara's husband
  - Satya Murthy; Surya's brother; Sri's husband
- Soundarya as Vasundhara; Surya 's wife
- Shenaz Treasurywala as Srilekha / Sri; Satya's wife
- Satyanarayana
- Nassar
- Kota Srinivasa Rao
- Brahmanandam
- Ali
- Chandra Mohan
- Venu Madhav
- L. B. Sriram
- Satya Prakash
- Ponnambalam
- Surya
- Kazan Khan
- Ranganath
- M.Balaiyah
- Achyuth as Surya Murthy's brother and Satya's elder brother, Bhavani's husband
- Prasad Babu
- Ananth
- Gundu Hanumantha Rao
- Gadiraju Subba Rao
- Chandra Mouli
- Vijaya Kumari
- Sudha
- Yamuna as Bhavani
- Baby Zeeba as Rani
- Ruthika

== Production ==
The film is the directorial debut of Jonnalagadda Srinivasa Rao. Jayabheri and Suryamurthy were originally considered as titles.

== Soundtrack ==
Eduruleni Manishi

Film score by S. A. Rajkumar
- Released: 2001
- Genre: Soundtrack
- Length: 27:16
- Label: Aditya Music
- Producer: S. A. Rajkumar

S. A. Rajkumar chronology
Simha Raasi (2001)	Eduruleni Manishi (2001)	Kalisi Naduddam (2001)

Music composed by S. A. Rajkumar. Music released on ADITYA Music Company

No.	Title	Lyrics	Singer(s)	Length
1.	"Enadaina Anukunnana"	Sirivennela Seetarama Sastry	Hariharan, Chitra	5:14
2.	"Nadumunu Chuste"	E. S. Murthy	Shankar Mahadevan, Anuradha Sriram	4:59
3.	"Manasannadhi Annadhi"	Pothula Ravi Kiran	Hariharan, Chithra	4:40
4.	"Dam Dama Dam Dam"	Chandrabose	S. P. Balasubrahmanyam, Shankar Mahadevan, Sujatha, Anuradha Sriram, Krishna Raj, P Rajani	4:59
5.	"Emaindamma Eenadu"	Sirivennela Seetarama Sastry	Hariharan	3:15
6.	"Are Eelakotti"	Chandrabose	Udit Narayan, Sujatha	4:09
Total length:				27:16

== Critical reception ==
Idlebrain wrote "Jonnalagadda Srinivasa Rao, the debutant director, did show his mettle in a few sentimental scenes and the portrayal of the character Surya Murthy. But he is insensible in handling class scenes. He tried to give a mass appeal to the film, which made this film lose its sophistication". Full Hyderabad wrote "This would have been a good movie if debutant director Jonnalagadda Srinivasa Rao had known how to handle a serious and sensitive subject. However, the comedy track essayed by Brahmanandam, Ali and L B Sriram manages to evoke laughter". Indiainfo wrote "Much hyped Eduruleni Manishi [..] unluckily it is a disappointing fare for the Nag's fans. The movie, which was very much talked about for the MTV anchor in it, is entertainment less. What does it have then? Hey, don't worry folks! It has a boring storyline, non-melodious songs and above all the irritating and scantily dressed Shehnaaz. Unfortunately Nagarjuna (who is very good in the movie) also has also not been able to save the movie". Telugu Cinema wrote "All looked well and in place before the release. A new young director on the hot seat and the hero willing to experiment a new get up. That led to a lot of hype. But the result is just another mass masala with anything hardly unique. This is another film where everything revolves around a majestic hero a la Chinarayudu, Pedarayudu, Maa Annaiah, etc. It’s strange that a new director comes up with such a stale kichidi particularly when the stakes on him were so high".
