= Choona =

2023 netflix Heist comedy series

- Genre: Heist comedy Thriller
- Created by: Pushpendra Nath Misra
- Directed by: Pushpendra Nath Misra
- Starring: Jimmy Shergill; Aashim Gulati; Vikram Kochhar; Namit Das; Chandan Roy; Gyanendra Tripathi; Monika Panwar; Niharika Lyra Dutt
- Narrated by: Arshad Warsi
- Music by: Dhruv Ghanekar
- Country of origin: India
- Original language: Hindi
- No. of seasons: 1
- No. of episodes: 8

Production
- Executive producers: Sonali Bhatia; Pushpendra Nath Misra
- Cinematography: Will Humphris; Aditya Kapur
- Editor: Aarti Bajaj
- Running time: 34–52 minutes
- Production company: Flying Saucer

Original release
- Network: Netflix
- Release: 29 September 2023

Choona is an Indian Hindi-language heist comedy thriller television series streaming on Netflix. Created, written and directed by Pushpendra Nath Misra and produced by Flying Saucer, the series stars Jimmy Shergill, Aashim Gulati, Vikram Kochhar, Namit Das, Chandan Roy, Gyanendra Tripathi, Monika Panwar and Niharika Lyra Dutt.

The series premiered on 29 September 2023.

== Premise ==
When an unlikely group of misfits discover a common enemy in the form of the ruthless yet superstitious politician, Avinash Shukla, they plot a heist to exact revenge.

== Cast ==
- Jimmy Shergill as Avinash Shukla, President of "Swacch Samaj Party"
- Aashim Gulati as Yakub Ansari Sheikh
- Vikram Kochhar as Contractor JP
- Monika Panwar as Bela
- Namit Das as Triloki
- Chandan Roy as Bishnu
- Gyanendra Tripathi as Baankey
- Niharika Lyra Dutt as Jhumpa
- Kishor Chandra as Shrivastav
- Atul Srivastava as Pandit Upadhyay
- Harpreet Bindra as Madan Singh
- Amit Sinha as Asthana
- Dheerendra Dwivedi as Sameer Kushwaha alias Mintu Grenade alias Mintu Bhai
- Vaibhav Mehta as Arunoday
- Jay Mukunda as Kishor Chaurasiya
- Arshad Warsi as The Narrator

== Production ==
=== Development ===
The series was officially announced in 2021 by Netflix media press release.

== Release ==
The series was premiered on 29 September 2023 on Netflix.

== Reception ==
"Choona" received mixed responses from the critics. Pratikshya Mishra from The Quint wrote in her review that "The underlying quirkiness of Choona occasionally detracts from the lengthy explication. I was unsure if the constant introduction of new characters would become old, but amazingly, it doesn't. In the great scheme of things, every narrative unfolds like a distinct set piece and is presented effectively. Choona is a programme whose setting is far more attractive than its finale".

Rahul Desai of Film Companion opined, "Choona takes the intriguing premise of a two-hour heist comedy and stretches it into an eight-episode drama on Netflix. This ambitious format shift offers both opportunities and challenges for storytelling".
