= Shehar Lakhot =

Indian drama series

- Genre: Drama
- Story by: Devika Bhagat; Navdeep Singh
- Directed by: Navdeep Singh
- Starring: Priyanshu Painyuli; Shruthy Menon; Chandan Roy Sanyal; Kubbra Sait
- Composer: Shivansh Jindal
- Country of origin: India
- Original language: Hindi
- No. of seasons: 1
- No. of episodes: 8

Production
- Producers: Khalil Bachooali; Navdeep Singh
- Cinematography: Vishal Vittal
- Editors: Nayan Bhadra; Suvir Nath
- Camera setup: Multi-camera
- Running time: 50 minutes
- Production company: Offroad Films

Original release
- Network: Amazon Prime Video
- Release: 30 November 2023

Shehar Lakhot is an Indian Hindi-language drama television series written and directed by Navdeep Singh. It was produced under the banner of Offroad Films, and stars Priyanshu Painyuli, Shruthy Menon, Chandan Roy Sanyal and Kubbra Sait. The series premiered on Amazon Prime Video on November 30, 2023, and has received mixed reviews from critics.

== Cast ==
- Priyanshu Painyuli as Devendra "Dev" Singh Tomar, Jay's younger brother and Vidushi's brother-in-law
- Shruthy Menon as Sandhya "Sandy", Dev's ex-girlfriend and love interest
- Chandan Roy Sanyal as Kairav
- Kubbra Sait as SI Pallavi Raj
- Manu Rishi Chadha as SHO Rajbir Singh Rangot
- Manjiri Pupala as Bhi Bhenno
- Sanjay Shiv Narayan as Bho Bhenno
- Chandan Roy as Vikas Kachdaar
- Shruti Jolly as Vidushi Tomar
- Abhilash Thapliyal as Antariksh Tyagi
- Vikas Bhakri as RP Singh
- Rishi Mehta as Ranga Singh
- Navdeep Singh Tomar as Sanju Yadav
- Lavina Sadhwani as Pinky
- Syed Mudassar Ali as Jamal Khan
- Kashyap Harsha Shangari as Jayendra "Jay" Singh Tomar, Dev's elder brother

== Production ==
The series was announced by Amazon Prime Video. The principal photography of the film started in mid-May 2022. Filming took place in Udaipur, Rajasthan, before wrapping up in November 2022. The trailer of the series was released on 13 September 2022. The series consisting of eight episodes premiered on Amazon Prime Video from 30 November 2023.

== Reception ==
Abhimanyu Mathur gave the series a two-star rating out of five in his review for DNA. In her review for Rediff.com, Deepa Gahlot rated the series a 2.5 out of 5 stars. Subhash K. Jha gave the series a three-star rating out of five in his review for Times Now.

The series was reviewed by various other media publications, such as Firstpost, Moneycontrol and WION.

== See also ==
- List of Amazon India originals
- List of Amazon Prime Video original programming
