= Jaanbaaz Hindustan Ke =

Indian Hindi-language web-series

- Created by: Samar Khan
- Directed by: Srijit Mukherji
- Starring: Regina Cassandra; Barun Sobti; Sumeet Vyas; Mita Vashisht
- Music by: Arko
- Country of origin: India
- Original language: Hindi
- No. of episodes: 8

Production
- Cinematography: Shanu Singh Rajput

Original release
- Network: ZEE5
- Release: 26 January 2023

Jaanbaaz Hindustan Ke is Hindi action thriller series starring Regina Cassandra, Barun Sobti, Sumeet Vyas, Mita Vashisht and Chandan Roy. It is produced by Juggernaut Productions and directed by National Film Award winner Srijit Mukherji.

== Plot ==
An edge-of-the-seat thriller, the story revolves around an IPS officer and single mother Kavya Iyer braving odds as she leads an investigation in an ISIS-K bomb attack case.

== Cast ==
- Regina Cassandra as NIA SP Kavya Iyer IPS
- Gayathrie as Thasleena
- Sumeet Vyas as Tariq
- Barun Sobti as Sameer Gupta IAS officer
- Deepika Amin as Sumithra Iyer, Kavya's Mother
- Jihan Hodar as Reyansh Gupta
- Anup Hazarika as Jason Wahlang
- Chien Ho Liao as Rupnath
- Mita Vashisht as Mahira Rizvi, NIA Chief
- Chandan Roy as Chandan Jha
- Sandeep Dhabale as Manas Shekhawat
- Manish Chaudhary as Abbas Rizvi
- Kunal Sharma as ACP Raj Singh Chaudhary
- Ranjeev lal Baruah as DIG Samuel Boruah
- Sharda Nand Singh as Inspector Mangalore

== Episodes ==
| No. | Title | Directed by | Written by | Original release date |
|---|---|---|---|---|
| 1 | "Grey Matters" | Srijit Mukherji | Karishmaa Oluchi | January 26, 2023 |
| 2 | "Hunch or Reality" | Srijit Mukherji | Karishmaa Oluchi | January 26, 2023 |
| 3 | "Resurrection" | Srijit Mukherji | Karishmaa Oluchi | January 26, 2023 |
| 4 | "Catfished" | Srijit Mukherji | Karishmaa Oluchi | January 26, 2023 |
| 5 | "Attack on Democracy" | Srijit Mukherji | Karishmaa Oluchi | January 26, 2023 |
| 6 | "The Story of Younus" | Srijit Mukherji | Karishmaa Oluchi | January 26, 2023 |
| 7 | "Truth of Uncle" | Srijit Mukherji | Karishmaa Oluchi | January 26, 2023 |
| 8 | "Fateh" | Srijit Mukherji | Karishmaa Oluchi | January 26, 2023 |

== Production ==
Jaanbaaz Hindustan Ke went on floors in September 2022 in Meghalaya. The show has been shot across Assam, Meghalaya, Maharashtra, Kerala and Rajasthan.

== Marketing ==
The teaser promo of Jaanbaaz Hindustan Ke was released on 3 January 2023. As a part of the promotions, Regina Cassandra met with police officers in Delhi's Connaught Place police station along with ex-cop Kiran Bedi to felicitate officers for their work.

== Reception ==
Writing for Rediff.com, Deepa Gahlot stated "The show is an earnest but mostly dull police procedural that shows in great detail how the cops find clues, chase suspects and protect the country."

Hindustan Times praised performance of Regina Cassandra and Mita Vashisht and wrote "Among the cast, Regina and Mita impress, even as the former stumbles in her dialogue delivery in certain scenes. But in the action sequences, Regina channels Kavya's ability to never back down. Sumeet and Gayathrie aren't as convincing as the main authors of the terror operation."

Archika Khurana of The Times of India rated the series 3.5 stars out of 5 and stated "The drama’s relentless pace adds to the thrill even as the villain constantly outwits the cops. Each episode is equally engaging, with the ‘Fateh’ song (by ARKO) interspersed to enhance the impact."

India Today gave negative opinion and wrote "Jaanbaaz Hindustan Ke just tries to sell old wine in a new bottle. However, the taste is bland. What disappoints us more is that a celebrated filmmaker like Srijit Mukherji has directed the series, and yet, could think of nothing out of the box."

A critic from Zoom TV wrote "From a gripping narrative and a captivating cat-and-mouse chase to well-shot action sequences and an effective emotional element, the show has a lot to offer."

Gautaman Bhaskaran for News18 wrote "The series swings from the North-east and Rajasthan to Kerala. Of course, it does not take much to guess how Jaanbaaz will end. However, Cassandra is interesting as a police officer who is posted on deputation to the NIA at Guwahati."

Firstpost wondered if the series was based on first female IPS from Assam Sanjukta Parashar serving at NIA as DIG or not, and wrote "During this phase, a bomb blast takes place in Guwahati, which leads to the assassination of the State CM and Kavya realizes that RDX in cement form is used in the blast. The case gets transferred to NIA (National Investigative Agency) under the supervision of Mahira Rizwi "
