= Varun Khandelwal =

Indian television actor

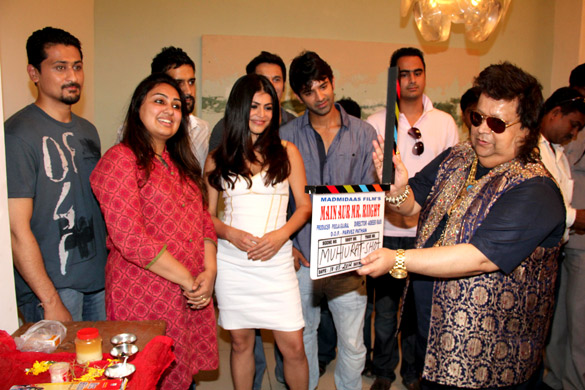
- Varun Khandelwal, Pooja Gujral, Kavi Shastri, Shenaz Treasuryvala, Barun Sobti, Bappi Lahiri at the launch of 'Main Aur Mr. Riight'
- Occupation: Actor
- Television: Kahaani Ghar Ghar Kii

Varun Khandelwal is an Indian television actor. He has played roles in many serials like Bhabhi, Kahaani Ghar Ghar Kii, Jyoti, Yahaaan Main Ghar Ghar Kheli, Diya Aur Baati Hum and "Sajan Ghar Jaana Hai".

== Television ==
| Serial |
|---|
| Kahaani Ghar Ghar Ki |
| Bhabhi |
| Special Squad |
| Bombay Talking |
| Meher |
| Doli Saja Ke |
| Aathvaan Vachan |
| Jyoti |
| Sajan Ghar Jaana Hain |
| Yahaaan Main Ghar Ghar Kheli |
| Diya Aur Baati Hum |
| Main Lakshmi Tere Aangan Ki |
| Crime Patrol |
| Nachle ve |
| Babul Ka Aangann Chootey Na |
| Yeh Hai Mohabbatein |

== Movies ==
- Zoop in India
- Main Aur Mr. Riight
