= Barun Sobti =

Indian actor (born 1984)

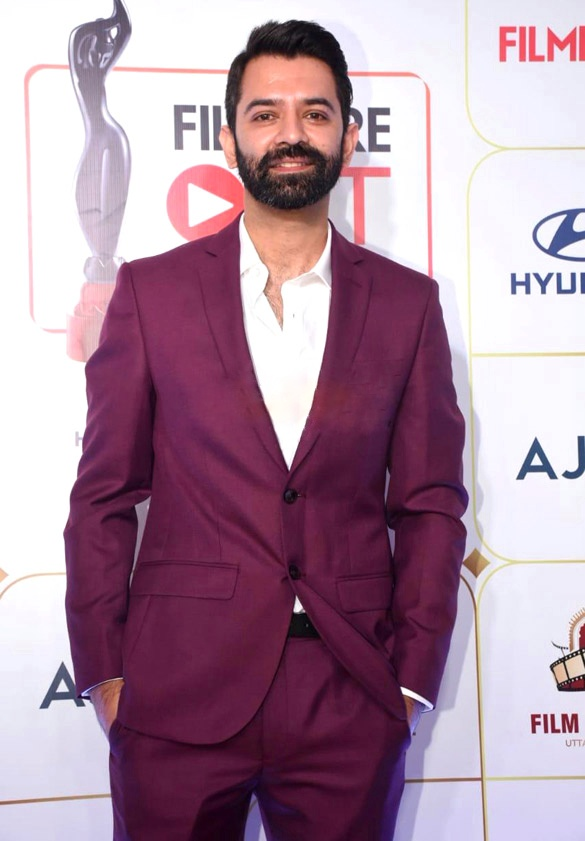
- Sobti at Filmfare OTT Awards 2023
- Born: 21 August 1984 (age 42); Delhi, India
- Occupations: Actor, writer
- Spouse: Pashmeen Manchanda (m. 2010)
- Children: 2

Signature
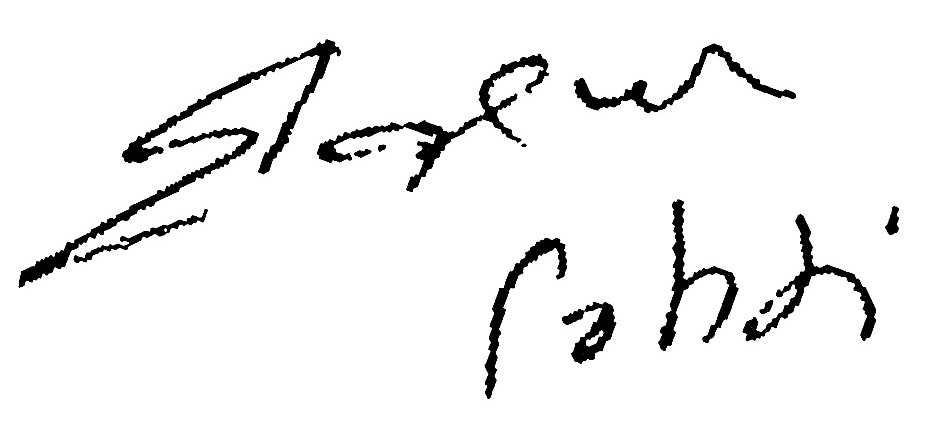

Barun Sobti is an Indian actor. He is known for his roles in Asur, Kohrra, Tu Hai Mera Sunday, Halahal, Raat Jawaan Hai, Tanhaiyan and Iss Pyaar Ko Kya Naam Doon. He has won the Filmfare OTT Award for Best Supporting Actor in a Drama Series for Kohrra in 2023 and for Best Actor in a Comedy Series for Raat Jawaan Hai in 2025 respectively.

== Career ==
Sobti made his television debut in 2009 as Swayam Khurana in Shraddha and subsequently appeared in a cameo role in Dill Mill Gayye. In 2010, he played Shravan Jaiswal in Baat Hamari Pakki Hai. He was well appreciated for his performance. He rose to prominence in 2011 with his portrayal of Arnav Singh Raizada in Iss Pyaar Ko Kya Naam Doon?, establishing himself as a leading television actor. In 2017, he headlined Iss Pyaar Ko Kya Naam Doon? 3, playing Arnav Singh Raizada.

Sobti made his film debut with Main Aur Mr. Riight (2014) and later appeared in the highly critically acclaimed Tu Hai Mera Sunday (2017). Sobti portrayed Arjun Anand, a reserved young man navigating friendship and love in Mumbai. His performance was noted for its naturalism and understated vulnerability, aligning with the film's slice-of-life tone. Directed by Milind Dhaimade, the film premiered at international festivals and received positive critical response.

In 2019, he featured in a short film “Derma” and the sports drama 22 Yards where he played a sports agent. The film premiered at the Bay Area South Asian Film Festival (BASAFF) in 2018, where he won the Best Actor Award for his performance.

Transitioning to digital platforms in parallel, he starred in Gul Khan's Tanhaiyan (2017) and The Great Indian Dysfunctional Family (2018) helmed by Ekta Kapoor.

In 2020, Sobti portrayed Nikhil Nair in Asur, a former CBI forensic expert drawn into investigating ritualistic killings rooted in mythology. Across two seasons, the psychological thriller explored faith, morality, and justice, with Nikhil at its core. His restrained, layered performance was widely praised for capturing the character's inner conflict and psychological strain. The series marked a significant milestone in his digital career.

Later in 2020, Sobti starred in Halahal, a crime drama that premiered on Eros Now. The film is loosely inspired by real-life events surrounding medical admission scams in India. Sobti portrayed Inspector Yusuf Qureshi, a morally ambiguous and street-smart police officer who becomes involved in the investigation of a medical student's suspicious death. His performance was noted for its restraint and layered portrayal of a conflicted officer navigating a flawed system.

Barun Sobti played a lawyer in Zee 5's 200 Halla Ho navigating a case rooted in caste oppression and gendered injustice. Set against the backdrop of marginalized Dalit women seeking justice, his character represents the legal system grappling with uncomfortable social realities. He also played a cameo role in Srijit Mukherji's web series Jaanbaaz Hindustan Ke. In 2023, he returned as Nikhil Nair in Asur 2. He further deepened the role, presenting a more conflicted and emotionally burdened Nair. The series went on to become a huge nationwide success, topping Ormax charts for months and becoming the most popular indian show on IMDB worldwide. He also starred in the Amazon Mini TV series Badtameez Dil, his second project with Ekta Kapoor.

In July 2023, he starred as Amarpal Garundi in the Netflix crime drama Kohrra, which received widespread critical acclaim, with particular praise for its writing, realism and performances. He won his first Filmfare OTT award for Kohrra.

In 2024, Sobti featured in Rakshak – India's Braves: Chapter 2 and the comedy-drama Raat Jawaan Hai, directed by Sumeet Vyas. His performance as Avinash, a stay-at-home dad, was well appreciated and Sobti won his second Best Actor Filmfare award for the series.

In February 2026, Sobti returned as Garundi in Kohrra 2, garnering positive reviews from critics yet again. The series was commended for its layered storytelling and character development, and Sobti's performance was noted for its restraint, emotional depth and consistency, further consolidating his reputation for portraying complex, grounded characters. Later in August 2026, he reunited with his Asur director, Oni Sen, as the commanding officer, Colonel Sartaj Singh, in Operation Safed Sagar, and with his Kohrra producer Sudip Sharma in Babita Singh Reporting. Although both roles had Sobti in cameos, his presence was felt and critically appreciated.

== Media image ==
Sobti gained worldwide popularity with the roaring success of Iss Pyaar Ko Kya Naam Doon?.

In November 2012, Sobti quit the show, citing personal reasons. This resulted in unprecedented backlash towards the producers and airing channel, Star Plus, by viewers who refused to watch the show with another male lead. Eventually, the show ended with Sobti's exit, with Star Plus releasing a disclaimer announcing that the show would not go on without him.

Times Of India noted that Sobti has redefined television stardom, making him "a huger star than the rest", for his exit caused the demise of a "TRP-tripping show". The show went on to be dubbed in 60+ countries, with Star Plus sending Sobti to several countries such as Turkey, Russia, Dubai, Indonesia, United Kingdom, Thailand and Uzbekistan for fan meet tours over the years.

In 2012, Eastern Eye ranked Sobti #10 in the Sexiest Asian Men list. In 2013, he ranked #3 behind only Hrithik Roshan and Ali Zafar. He consistently ranked amongst the top 6 until the last vote in 2016. Moreover, in 2012, he was the only Indian television actor to be officially featured in People Magazine's annual "20 Most Intriguing People" list.

Sobti tasted further international success after Iss Pyaar Ko Kya Naam Doon. His show Baat Hamari Pakki Hai was dubbed in Malayalam, Turkish and Arabic and Iss Pyaar Ko Kya Naam Doon? 3 in Tamil, Telugu, Malayalam, Turkish, Russian, Arabic, Bahasa Indonesia and Bahasa Malayu, to cater to his international audience.

His web series Asur was broadcast on Colors UK in December 2023 to early 2024. Sobti also bagged a prestigious international award, the Asian Television Awards, the most significant industry-voted honors for pan-Asian broadcasting, for Best Actor in a Supporting Role for his role in Asur.

In 2026, Kohrra 2 was nominated big at the Indian Film Festival of Melbourne (IFFM), including Sobti for Best Performance (Male) - Series

== Personal life ==
Barun Sobti married his high school sweetheart, Pashmeen Manchanda, on 12 December 2010, in a private ceremony in Gurudwara. They have two children, Sifat Sobti, born in June 2019, and Meer Sobti, born in April 2023.

== Filmography ==
=== Web releases ===
Year	Title	Role	Platform	Format
2015	Dry Dreams	Protagonist	YouTube	Short Film
2017	Tanhaiyan	Haider Ali Khan	Hotstar	Web Series
2018	The Great Indian Dysfunctional Family	Samar Ranaut	Alt Balaji	Web Series
2019	Derma	Anthony	JioCinema	Short Film
2020	Asur	Nikhil Nair	JioHotstar	Web Series
2020	Halahal	Inspector Yusuf Qureshi	Eros Now	Web Movie
2020	The Missing Stone	Sahir	MX Player	Web Series
2021	The Last Boy To Fall In Love	Amartya	Audible	Audiobook
2021	200 Halla Ho	Umesh Joshi	Zee5	Web Movie
2021	When a Man Loves a Woman	Peter	YouTube	Short Film
2023	Jaanbaaz Hindustan Ke	Sameer	Zee5	Cameo - Web Series
2023	Asur 2	Nikhil Nair	JioHotstar	Web Series
2023	Badtameez Dil	Karan Singh Rathod	Amazon MX Player	Web Series
2023	Kohrra	Amarpal Garundi	Netflix	Web Series
2024	Rakshak - India's Brave 2	Naib Subedar Sombir Singh	Amazon MX Player	Web Series
2024	Raat Jawaan Hai	Avinash	Sony Liv	Web Series
2026	Kohrra 2	Amarpal Garundi	Netflix	Web Series
2026	Lost & Found	Kush Ahuja	YouTube	Mini Series
2026	Operation Safed Sagar	Col. Sartaj Singh	Netflix	Web Series
2026	Babita Singh Reporting	Bansi Seni	Prime Video	Web Movie
2026	Welcome To Khoya Mahal †	Kanishk	Prime Video	Web Series
2026	Tumhari Khushboo †	Kamran	TBA	Short Film
2027	Pushpak Viman †	TBA	Netflix	Web Series
2027	Asur 3 †	Nikhil Nair	JioHotstar	Web Series
2027	A Trip So Far †	N.A.	N.A.	Web Movie

=== Television ===
Year	Title	Role
2009	Shraddha	Swayam Khurana
2010	Dill Mill Gayye	Dr. Raj Singh (Cameo)
2010–2011	Baat Hamari Pakki Hai	Shravan Jaiswal
2011–2012	Iss Pyaar Ko Kya Naam Doon?	Arnav Singh Raizada
2017	Iss Pyaar Ko Kya Naam Doon 3	Advay Singh Raizada/Dev Kashyap

=== Theatrical films ===
Year	Title	Role
2014	Main Aur Mr. Riight	Sukhwinder "Sukhi" Singh / Hridaan Dalmiya
2017	Tu Hai Mera Sunday	Arjun Anand
2019	22 Yards	Ronajith "Ron" Sen
2026	Hawks †	Jagadish

=== Music videos ===
Year	Title	Singer(s)
2021	Taqleefein	Amit Mishra, Ritika Raj Singh
2021	Tera Mera	Papon

== Awards and nominations ==
Year	Award	Category	Nominated work	Result	Ref.
2011	Star Guild Awards	Best Actor	Baat Hamari Pakki Hai	Nominated	
2012	People's Choice Awards India	Favorite Actor (Drama)	Iss Pyaar Ko Kya Naam Doon?	Won	
2012	People's Choice Awards India	Favorite Onscreen Couple	Iss Pyaar Ko Kya Naam Doon?	Won (Note: Shared with Sanaya Irani)	
2012	ITA Awards	Best Actor – Popular	Iss Pyaar Ko Kya Naam Doon?	Won (Note: Tied with Samir Soni)	
2012	Indian Telly Awards	Best Onscreen Couple	Iss Pyaar Ko Kya Naam Doon?	Won	
2012	Gold Awards	Best Couple	Iss Pyaar Ko Kya Naam Doon?	Won	
2012	Star Parivaar Awards	Favourite New Member (Male)	Iss Pyaar Ko Kya Naam Doon?	Won	
2012	Star Parivaar Awards	Favourite Stylish Member (Male)	Iss Pyaar Ko Kya Naam Doon?	Won	
2012	Star Parivaar Awards	Favourite Jodi	Iss Pyaar Ko Kya Naam Doon?	Won	
2012	Star Parivaar Awards	Favourite International Jodi	Iss Pyaar Ko Kya Naam Doon?	Won	
2020	Asian Television Awards	Best Supporting Actor	Asur	Won	
2023	Filmfare OTT Awards	Best Supporting Actor, Series (Male) – Drama	Kohrra	Won	
2023	ITA Awards	Best Actor Popular – OTT	Kohrra	Won	
2023	Critics' Choice Awards	Best Supporting Actor – Web Series	Kohrra	Nominated	
2025	Critics' Choice Awards	Best Actor – Web Series	Raat Jawaan Hai	Won	
2025	Filmfare OTT Awards	Best Actor, Series (Male) – Comedy	Raat Jawaan Hai	Won	
