= Voot =

Defunct Indian subscription video on demand service

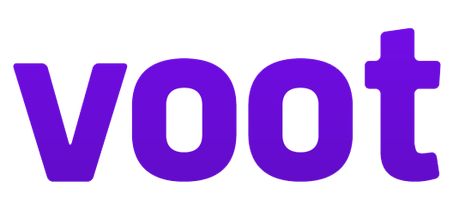
- Company type: Streaming
- Website type: OTT platform
- Available in: Hindi; English; Bengali; Marathi; Gujarati; Tamil; Telugu; Malayalam; Kannada
- Dissolved: 2023; 3 years ago
- Successor: JioCinema
- Headquarters: Mumbai, Maharashtra, India
- Area served: India; United Kingdom (Virgin Media only); United States (Sling TV only)
- Owners: Viacom18 (2016–2023)
- Industry: Entertainment; Mass media
- Products: Streaming media; Video on demand; Digital distribution
- Services: Film production; Film distribution; Television production
- Commercial: Yes
- Registration: Optional
- Launched: 2016; 10 years ago

Voot was an Indian subscription video-on-demand and over-the-top streaming service owned by Viacom18, a joint venture between Reliance Industries, Network18. The service was initially launched on 4 May 2016. It initially launched as an advertising-supported service, before introducing a subscription tier in 2020 under the Voot Select banner.

== History ==
Launched in March 2016, Voot initially operated as an advertising-supported service.

In February 2020, Voot introduced a paid subscription service known as Voot Select, offering exclusive original series, and early access to selected programmes before their television premiere.

In April 2022, Reliance Industries and Paramount Global announced additional financial backing from Uday Shankar and James Murdoch's Bodhi Tree Systems to expand their streaming business. This would include Reliance's competing JioCinema service being brought under Viacom18. The agreement was approved by the Competition Commission of India (CCI) in September 2022.

The two services initially co-existed, but Voot began to wind down and migrate its content to JioCinema in August 2023, beginning with sports rights such as the 2022 FIFA World Cup, and upcoming rights to the Indian Premier League. New series of Voot originals began premiering on JioCinema in June 2023.

In August 2023, Voot was shut down in favour of JioCinema.

== Programming ==
Voot had content from Colors TV, MTV, Nickelodeon, and other Viacom18-owned television channels. It also hosted Bollywood films for streaming. It had produced several 'Voot Originals' shows for streaming as well. In the children's segment, it worked on shows in Malayalam.

In March 2021, it was announced that Voot Select would add original programming from U.S. parent company Paramount Global's upcoming global streaming service Paramount+, as well as selected CBS and Showtime original series.

=== Original series ===
Title	Genre	Premiere	Cast(s)
Chinese Bhasad	Comedy	1 May 2016	
Soadies	Comedy drama	2016	Baba Sehgal, Anju Mahendru, Raghu Ram, and Rajiv
Sinskaari	Sex related Web-chat show	18 May 2016	Alok Nath
Badman	Mockumentary	8 July 2016	Gulshan Grover, Chunky Pandey
Shaadi Boys	Satirical Comedy-drama	22 July 2016	Aakash Ahuja
It's Not That Simple	Drama	6 October 2016	Swara Bhaskar, Akshay Oberoi, Karan Veer Mehra, Vivan Bhatena
Untag	Comedy drama	1 January 2017	Meiyang Chang, VJ Andy, Dipannita Sharma and Shiv Panditt
Yo Ke Hua Bro	Comedy	18 August 2017	Aparshakti Khurana, Gaurav Pandey, Ridhima Pandit, Sumeet Vyas and Shamita Shetty
Stupid Man Smart Phone	Travel show	20 September 2017	Sumeet Vyas
Time Out	Drama	27 November 2017	Tahir Raj Bhasin and Sarah-Jane Dias
Its Not That Simple 2	Drama	14 December 2018	Swara Bhaskar, Akshay Oberoi, Karan Veer Mehra, Vivan Bhatena
Shortcuts	Anthology Thriller	8 February 2019	
Fuh Se Fantasy	Anthology Romance	5 April 2019	
Marzi	Psychological thriller	2 March 2020	Rajeev Khandelwal and Aahana Kumra
Asur	Thriller	2 March 2020	Barun Sobti, Arshad Warsi, Anupriya Goenka, Ridhi Dogra, Sharib Hashmi, Amey Wagh
The Raikar Case	Crime thriller	9 April 2020	Ashwini Bhave, Atul Kulkarni, Kunal Karan Kapoor, Lalit Prabhakar, Neil Bhoopalam, Parul Gulati
Illegal - Justice, Out of Order	Political thriller	12 May 2020	Neha Sharma, Akshay Oberoi, Deepak Tijori, Piyush Mishra
The Gone Game	Crime thriller	20 August 2020	Sanjay Kapoor, Shweta Tripathi, Arjun Mathur, Shriya Pilgaonkar, Dibyendu Bhattacharya
Crackdown	Action thriller	23 September 2020	Saqib Saleem, Shriya Pilgaonkar, Rajesh Tailang
Candy	Thriller	September 2021	Richa Chadda, Ronit Roy, Manu Rishi, Gopal Datt
Bigg Boss OTT	Reality show	August 2021	Karan Johar, Divya Agarwal, Nishant Bhat, Pratik Sehajpal, Shamita Shetty
Ranjish Hi Sahi	Drama	January 2022	Tahir Raj Bhasin, Amala Paul, Amrita Puri
Apharan 2 - Sabka Katega Dobara	Action drama	18 March 2022	Arunoday Singh, Mahie Gill, Monica Chaudhary, Nidhi Singh, Varun Badola
London Files	Crime, thriller	21 April 2022	Arjun Rampal, Purab Kohli, Gopal Dutt, Sapna Pabbi, Medha Rana, Warren Palmer
Baked - The Bad Trip	Comedy	2 May 2022	Pranay Manchanda, Shantanu Anam, Manik Papneja, Kriti Vij
Aadha Ishq	Romantic, thriller	12 May 2022	Gaurav Arora, Aamna Sharif, Kunaal Roy Kapur, Pratibha Ranta
Code M Season 2	Crime, thriller	9 June 2022	Jennifer Winget, Tanuj Virwani
Cyber Vaar	Crime, thriller	10 June 2022	Mohit Malik, Sanaya Irani
The Great Weddings of Munnes	Comedy drama	4 August 2022	Abhishek Banerjee, Barkha Singh, Paresh Ganatra, Sunita Rajwar, Aakash Dabhade

== Closing ==
Voot was shut down in August 2023 and its content moved to JioCinema, which then merged with Disney+ Hotstar in early 2025 to form JioHotstar.

== See also ==
- Paramount+
- Discovery+
- HBO Max
- Peacock
- Disney+
- Disney+ Hotstar
- List of streaming media services
- Video on demand
