= Sankalp (TV series) =

2026 Indian television series

- Official Digital Release Poster
- Genre: Political Drama
- Written by: Reshu Nath; Prasad Kadam; Chandan Kumar
- Directed by: Prakash Jha
- Starring: Nana Patekar; Mohammed Zeeshan Ayyub; Kubbra Sait; Sanjay Kapoor; Neeraj Kabi
- Country of origin: India
- Original language: Hindi
- No. of seasons: 1
- No. of episodes: 10

Production
- Producers: Jyoti Deshpande; Dishaa Jhaa
- Cinematography: Chandan Kowli
- Camera setup: Multi-camera
- Production companies: Jio Studios; PJP Films

Original release
- Network: Amazon MX Player
- Release: 11 March 2026 – present

Sankalp is a 2026 Indian Hindi-language socio-political drama streaming television series directed by Prakash Jha and produced by Jyoti Deshpande and Dishaa Jha under the banner of Jio Studios and PJP Films. It stars Nana Patekar, Mohammed Zeeshan Ayyub, Kubbra Sait, Sanjay Kapoor and Neeraj Kabi. The series premiered on 11 March 2026 on Amazon MX Player.

== Synopsis ==
Sankalp is an Indian socio-political drama that explores how power is manufactured not through elections, but through mentorship and institutional control. Inspired by the ancient Chanakya-Chandragupta chronicles, the series reimagines political strategy for modern India, where classrooms replace battlefields and bureaucrats replace soldiers. In short, this 10-episode drama reimagines the Chanakya-Chandragupta (mentor-mentee) relation in an imagined situation in contemporary India.

The large part of the serial is based in Patna (Bihar), while there are references to Delhi as well.

The series starts in a slow manner and it remains so all through.

== Cast ==
- Nana Patekar as Kanhaiya Lal
- Mohammed Zeeshan Ayyub as SP Aditya Verma
- Kubbra Sait as DCP Parveen Sheikh
- Sanjay Kapoor as Prashant Singh, Chief Minister of Delhi
- Neeraj Kabi as Waqar Mapillah
- Meghna Malik as Suhasini
- Roop Durgapal as Madhuri
- Kranti Prakash Jha as Kasturi
- Tushar Pandey as Satyaveer Mishra
- Sheen Das as Jayanti Rai
- Paras Priyadarshan as Shashi Ranjan
- Gita Guha as Liluatiya
- Brij Gopal as Zakir Shaikh
- Anuradha Chandan as Sarla
- Ashok Kumar Beniwal as DIG Rudra Pratap
- Danish Iqbal as K C Majumdar
- Bhagwan Tiwari as Sankarshan
- Saurabh Goyal as Vasudev Gupta
- Tanmay Ranjan as Neeraj

== Episodes ==
=== Season 1 ===
Series	Episodes	Originally released
1	10	11 March 2026

No.	Title	Directed by	Original release date
1	"Sankalp"	Prakash Jha	11 March 2026
2	"Guru Dakshina"	Prakash Jha	11 March 2026
3	"Masterstroke"	Prakash Jha	11 March 2026
4	"Apmaan"	Prakash Jha	11 March 2026
5	"Sendh"	Prakash Jha	11 March 2026
6	"Vishwaasghaat"	Prakash Jha	11 March 2026
7	"Ant Kaa Aarambh"	Prakash Jha	11 March 2026
8	"Collateral Damage"	Prakash Jha	11 March 2026
9	"Check-Mate"	Prakash Jha	11 March 2026
10	"Punarsankalp"	Prakash Jha	11 March 2026

== Production ==
Prakash Jha announced a socio-political web series starring Nana Patekar and Sanjay Kapoor, which was initially reported under the working title "Laal Batti". The project marks Nana Patekar's debut in the OTT space and is set against a political backdrop, with the actor playing a lawyer-turned-politician while Sanjay Kapoor portrays his close associate. The series was officially unveiled by Jio Studios on 12 April 2023 during its large content slate announcement at the Jio World Convention Centre in Mumbai. Later in development, the show's title was changed and it is now known as "Sankalp".

== Release ==
The series primeired on 11 March 2026 on Amazon MX Player.

== Reception ==
Rahul Desai of The Hollywood Reporter India calls it a "A welcome return to basics," and as formulaic as Sankalp is, it's one of those uncannily sketched shows that mines a long-standing culture of reverence and obligation. Archika Khurana of The Times of India gave 3.5 stars out of 5 and said that "With its mix of strategy, ideology and personal conflict, Sankalp ultimately stands as a thought-provoking exploration of how power operates—not just in politics, but in the relationships that shape it."

Bollywood Hungama rated it 2.5/5 stars and writes that "SANKALP rests on a compelling storyline and strong performances by Nana Patekar and the other lead actors. However, the excessive length, silly goings-on and weak climax dilute the impact. Nevertheless, the show should manage to garner viewership due to its mass-appealing treatment and casting." BH Harsh of Cinema Express also gave 2.5 stars out of 5 and said that "The Prakash Jha series has its moments, but struggles to maintain momentum with its many subplots."

Deepa Gahlot of Rediff.com gave 3 stars out of 5 and noted that "'There is a fortune in stolen money, counterfeit notes floating around, and political skullduggery afoot, along with treachery, double dealing, kidnapping and all manner of wickedness packing the series so densely that the pace never flags and a profusion of twists keeps the story engaging even when it strains credibilit." Anuj Kumar of The Hindu observed that "The attempt at subversive social-political inquiry into mentorship and manipulation is diminished by overwriting and tiresome visual and creative contrivances."

Zinia Bandyopadhyay of Firstpost rated it 2.5/5 stars and said that "Sankalp is a show with ambition, ideas and a commanding central performance. But a sprawling narrative and uneven pacing dilute what could have been a far sharper political drama." Free Press Journal's Troy Ribeiro gave 3 stars out of 5 and said that "Sankalp is an engaging political thriller on mentorship, power and revenge, elevated by strong performances despite occasional narrative imbalance."

B H Harsh from the New Indian Express claimed that "Nana Patekar’s OTT debut lacks energy and coherence."
