= The Great Indian Dysfunctional Family =

Indian drama web series

- Genre: Drama
- Created by: Dipika Bajpai
- Developed by: Ekta Kapoor
- Written by: Dialogues; Shantanu Srivastava
- Screenplay by: Shantanu Srivastava
- Story by: Eisha Chopra
- Directed by: Rajlaxmi Ratan Seth
- Creative director: Nimisha Pandey
- Starring: see below
- Composer: Pranaay
- Country of origin: India
- Original language: Hindi
- No. of seasons: 1
- No. of episodes: 10

Production
- Executive producer: Vishal Manwar
- Production locations: Mumbai, India
- Cinematography: Abhimanyu Sengupta
- Editor: Ajay Sharma
- Camera setup: Multi-camera
- Running time: 18-23 minutes
- Production company: DING Entertainment

Original release
- Network: ALT Balaji
- Release: 10 October 2018

The Great Indian Dysfunctional Family is a 2018 Hindi web series created by Dipika Bajpai for video on demand platform ALTBalaji. The series stars Kay Kay Menon and Barun Sobtiband revolves around the relationships between the brothers and their families, heartbreaks and breakdowns.

The series is available for streaming on the ALT Balaji App and its associated websites since its release date.

== Plot ==
The series revolves around a Ranaut family and explores the estranged relationships between two brothers Samar Ranaut (Barun Sobti) and Vikram Ranaut (Kay Kay Menon). The story begins when Samar, Vikram's estranged brother returns home with his wife after having fled both from home and the army 8 years ago. After his return begins an unusual family reunion that escalates into a series of heartbreaks, betrayals, and emotional breakdowns, questioning the trust in every relationship.

== Cast ==
- Kay Kay Menon as Vikram Ranaut (Ex.Army Officer), Samar's elder brother
- Barun Sobti as Samar Ranaut, Vikram's younger brother
- Swaroop Sampat as Premlata Ranaut, mother of Vikram and Samar
- Shriswara as Geeta Ranaut, wife of Vikram Ranaut
- Eisha Chopra as Sonali Ranaut, wife of Samar Ranaut
- Sanaya Pithawalla as Aditi Ranaut (daughter of Vikram and Geeta Ranaut)
- Prithviraj Sarnaik as Mridual Ranaut (son of Vikram and Geeta Ranaut)

== Episodes ==
- Episode 1: Meet The Ranauts.
- Episode 2: The Wedding Fiasco.
- Episode 3: The Aftermath.
- Episode 4: A Deadly Secret.
- Episode 5: Wounds of the Past.
- Episode 6: It Happened One Night.
- Episode 7: Testing Times.
- Episode 8: The Beginning of the End.
- Episode 9: A Life Less Ordinary.
- Episode 10: A Glimmer of Hope.

== Reception ==
Nicole of The Quint writes "Beyond its contemporary packaging, TGIDF doesn’t reinvent the wheel. But it’s entertaining nonetheless much in a way that watching a mindless Bollywood flick is."
