= Halahal (film) =

2020 Hindi mystery thriller film

- Directed by: Randeep Jha
- Written by: Zeishan Quadri
- Screenplay by: Gibran Noorani
- Produced by: Eros Motion Pictures; Zeishan Quadri; Priyankka Bassi; Shalini Chaudhary
- Starring: Barun Sobti; Sachin Khedekar
- Cinematography: Piyush Puty
- Edited by: Nitesh Bhatia
- Music by: Sageesh Bhandari; Naman Adhikari; Abhinav Sharma; Arjun Bhaybhang
- Production company: Eros International
- Distributed by: Eros Now
- Release date: 21 September 2020
- Running time: 97 minutes
- Country: India
- Language: Hindi

Halahal is an Indian Hindi-language mystery thriller film which premiered on Eros Now on 21 September 2020. The film was written and produced by Zeishan Quadri and directed by Randeep Jha. Starring Barun Sobti and Sachin Khedekar in lead roles. This film is loosely based on Vyapam Scam.

== Plot ==
This film revolves with the journey of Doctor Shiv Shankar to find out the truth of his daughter's murder. His daughter Archana, was a medical student. After the murder her death is ruled as suicide by the higher authority. Her father then decides to investigate the case himself. Yusuf, a corrupt police inspector helps him to search the man behind the incident. When Shiv and Yusuf intrude deep in the case, it unravel a massive medical institutional racket which is politically powerful and systematically fixes rates for medical entrance exam seats.

== Cast ==
- Barun Sobti as Inspector Yusuf Qureshi
- Sachin Khedekar as Dr. Shiv Shankar Sharma
- Manu Rishi Chadha as Bhaisahab
- Enab Khizra as Archana Sharma
- Purnendu Bhattacharya as Acharya
- Archit Sharma as Sanaya
- Sanaya Bansal as Pooja
- Anuradha Mukherjee as Nandini
- Vijay Kumar Dogra as Manoj
- Chetan Sharma as Ashish
- Tilak Raj Joshi as Subhash
- Hurmat Ali Khan as Prakash Rao
- Dimple Kaur as Sunita
- Jitender Gaur as Hooda

== Reception ==
Archika Khurana of The Times of India gave the film two and a half out of five stars stating "The story is griping in the beginning but tends to get a bit draggy towards the end. However, the final nail in the coffin is its unrealistic climax."

Writing in News18 Rohit Vats states "Minor flaws overlooked, Halahal is engaging for sure, and its lead talents are quite impressive. With careful project selection, the director can offer much more."

The Free Press Journal gave the movie three stars out of five and Heer Kothari states "Impressive performances make this film watchable."
