= RK/RKay =

2021 Hindi film directed by Rajat Kapoor

RK/Rkay
- Theatrical release poster
- Directed by: Rajat Kapoor
- Written by: Rajat Kapoor
- Starring: Rajat Kapoor; Mallika Sherawat; Ranvir Shorey; Manu Rishi; Kubbra Sait
- Cinematography: Rafey Mehmood
- Edited by: Suresh Pai
- Music by: Sagar Desai
- Production companies: Nflicks Pvt Ltd; Priyanshi films Mithya Talkies
- Release dates: 14 May 2021 (United States); 22 July 2022 (India)
- Running time: 99 minutes
- Country: India
- Language: Hindi

RK/Rkay is a 2021 Indian Hindi-language comedy-drama film written and directed by Rajat Kapoor, starring himself with Mallika Sherawat, Kubbra Sait, Ranvir Shorey and Manu Rishi Chadha. The film appeared at international festivals, including Shanghai International Film Festival, Austin Film Festival.

== Cast ==
- Rajat Kapoor as RK/RKAY
- Mallika Sherawat as Gulabo/Neha
- Ranvir Shorey as KN Singh/Ranvir
- Kubbra Sait as Seema
- Chandrachoor Rai as Namit
- Manu Rishi Chadha as Goel
- Tara Sharma
- Kallirroi Tziafeta

== Release ==
The film appeared at several film festivals. and then was scheduled to release theatrically on 22 July 2022. It premiered in the US on 14 May 2021

== Critical response ==
RK/RKay received generally positive reviews.

On the review aggregator website Rotten Tomatoes, 83% of 18 critics' reviews are positive, with an average rating of 6.1/10.. Several critics praised the performances and the deeply rich whimsical script.

Renuka Vyavhare of Times of India gave 3/5 stars and called it "a delightful game of hide and seek between real and fiction."

Outlook went with 4/5 stars stating that it is "a thorough entertainer."

Tanul Thakur of The Wire adorned RK/RKay review by asserting, "'RK/RKay' Is a Genie of Genius Filmmaking – And Can't Be Caught in a Bottle."

Saibal Chatterjee of NDTV India gave 3/5 stars stating, "It might not exactly send you into paroxysms of delight, but the film thrives on a steady flow of wry wit and humour - and flashes of vitality."

Poulomi Das of News9Live gave 4/5 stars stating, "There are films that blow your mind and there are films that make you impossibly grateful for the medium. RK/RKay is both those films and so much more."

Nidhima Taneja of ThePrint gave 3.5/5 stars stating, "Rajat Kapoor’s RK/RKay is more than a film—it’s a genre-bending treat."

Suparana Sharma of Rolling Stone India gave 3/5 stars stating, "Rajat Kapoor’s new film toys with our mind, and is that rare sort of Bollywood movie that makes us think & At other times I thought RK/Rkay was bringing to life what Rajesh Khanna had said in Anand: “Hum sab toh rangmanch ki kathputhliyan hain jinki dor uparwale ke haath mein…” And during some scenes my mind drifted to strange thoughts – what if we are not watching the films, but the films are watching us."

Sabina Dana Plasse of Film Threat gave 8/10 stars stating, "RK/RKay presents a great appreciation for the artistry required to make a film."

Newsgram gave 4/5 stars saying that 'RK/RKay' is a delight for cinema lovers.

Jay Weissberg of Variety enunciated, "Rajat Kapoor's RK/RKay is enjoyable comedy set in the film world that makes for pleasant entertainment."

Udita Jhunjhunwala of Firstpost wrote, "RK/RKay is an enjoyable and whimsical film which is homage and wistful tribute to the meta world it inhabits."
