= Chandan Roy =

Indian actor (b. 1995)

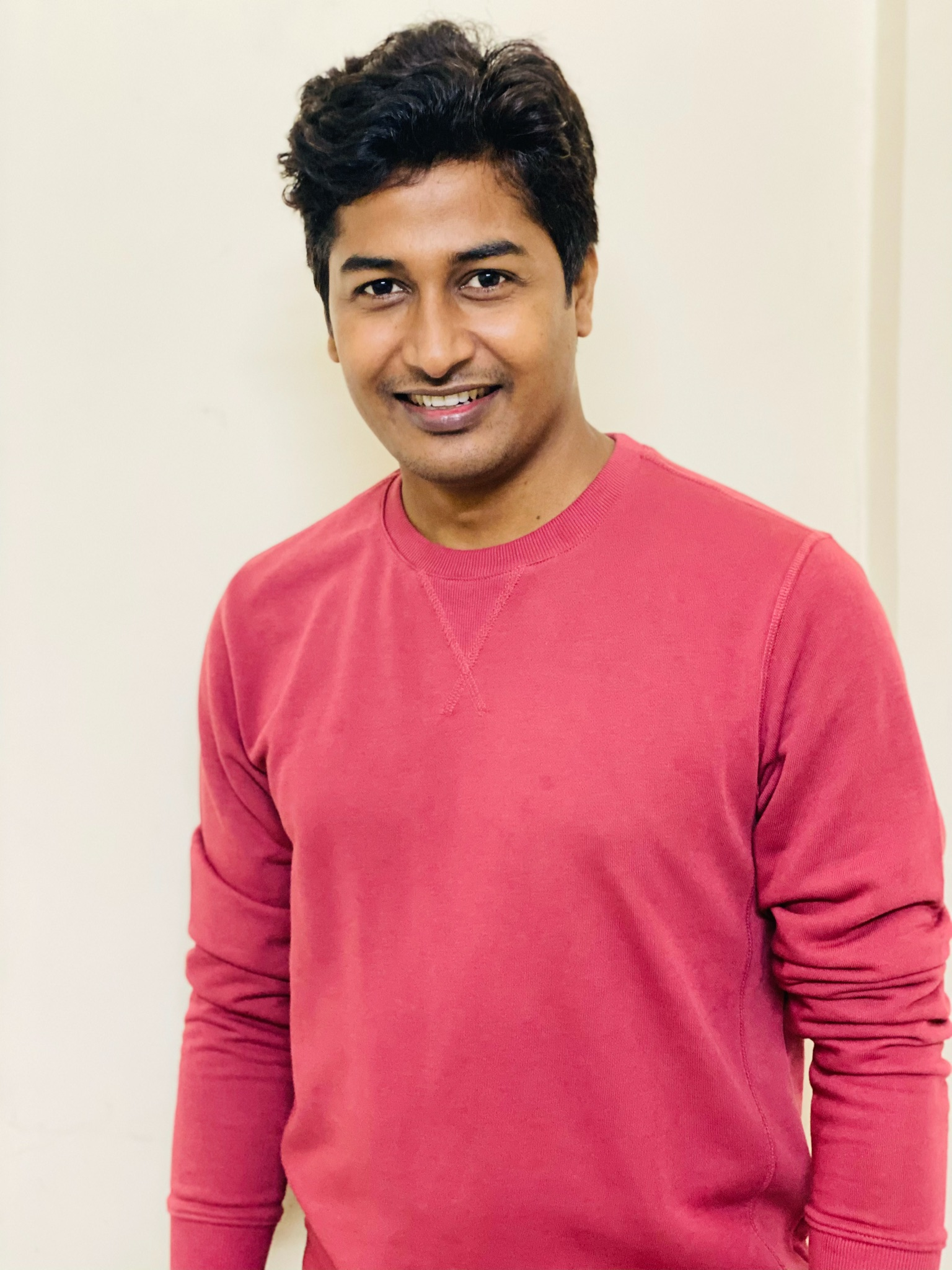
- Born: 20 December 1995 (age 30); Mahnar, Bihar, India
- Education: Patna University; Indian Institute of Mass Communication, Delhi
- Occupation: Actor

Chandan Roy (born 20 December 1995) is an Indian actor. He made his screen debut with Amazon Prime’s Panchayat. His other major works are Choona (2023), Shehar Lakhot (2023), Gulmohar (2023), Sanak (2021).

== Early life ==
Roy comes from a village in Mahnar, Bihar. Roy worked as a journalist for Dainik Jagran. However, during his days at IIMC in Delhi, he was involved with the Bahroop Theatre Group, Jawaharlal Nehru University, and the National School of Drama Repertory. After working with Jagran for two and a half years, Roy decided to quit his job and moved to Mumbai in 2017.

== Career ==
After arriving in Mumbai, Chandan initially took on small roles in Indian daily soaps. He struggled in Mumbai until he had a breakthrough with Amazon Prime's Web Series Panchayat (2020). In the series, he portrayed the character of a village simpleton Vikas Shukla, which earned him an appreciation for his heartwarming performance.

Since then, he has continued working with The Viral Fever, on Panchayat, Hostel Daze and TVF Pitchers. Chandan has made a mark in the India web series space with shows like Choona (2023) Shehar Lakhot (2023), Jaanbaaz Hindustan Ke (2023).

Furthermore, Roy gained recognition for his comic role in the action drama film Sanak (2021) and the family drama film Gulmohar (2023). He also starred in FTII diploma film Champaran Mutton, which represented India at the Student Academy Awards.

His forthcoming film 'Tirichh: Portrait of a Dying Man' is written & directed by Sanjeev K Jha who adapted a renowned story by Uday Prakash. The film explores themes of human relationships and societal disparities through the lens of an evocative narrative.

== Filmography ==
=== Films ===
Year	Film	Role	Notes	Ref.
2020	Jamun	Dinoo	Eros Now	
2021	State of Siege: Temple Attack	Mohsin	ZEE5	
2021	Sanak	Riyaz Ahmed	Hotstar	
2023	Gulmohar	Paramhans	Hotstar	
2023	Champaran Mutton	Ramesh	FTII Diploma Short Film	
2025	Aakhri Ride	Aman Kumar Yadav	short film	
2026	Gandhari	Somesh	Netflix	

=== Web Series ===
Year	Title	Role	Platform	Ref.
2020–present	Panchayat Season 1-4	Vikas Shukla	Amazon Prime Video	
2021	Hostel Daze Season 2	Santosh	Amazon Prime Video	
2022	TVF Pitchers Season 2	Broker	ZEE 5	
2023	Choona	Bishnu	Netflix	
2023	Shehar Lakhot	Vikas Kachadar	Amazon Prime Video	
2023	Jaanbaaz Hindustan Ke	Chandan Jha	ZEE 5	
