= 22 Yards =

2018 film by Mitali Ghoshal

- 22 Yards Poster
- Directed by: Mitali Ghoshal
- Screenplay by: Samrat
- Story by: Samrat Mukherjee (SRFTI)
- Produced by: Mitali Ghoshal, Surya Sinha
- Starring: Barun Sobti; Rajit Kapur; Panchi Bora; Rajesh Sharma
- Cinematography: Ranjan Palit; Amit Singh
- Edited by: Ajay Sharma
- Music by: Songs: Amartya Ray; Amartya Bobo Rahut; Score: Dharma Vish
- Distributed by: Platoon One Films; PVR Pictures
- Release dates: 22 September 2018 (BASAFF); 15 March 2019 (India)
- Country: India
- Language: Hindi

22 Yards is a 2018 Indian Hindi-language sports drama film starring Barun Sobti, Rajit Kapur, Panchi Bora and Rajesh Sharma. The film has been directed by sports journalist turned filmmaker Mitali Ghoshal. The film premiered at the 2018 Bay Area South Asian Film Festival and was released theatrically on 15 March 2019. The trailer of the film was launched by Sourav Ganguly.

== Plot ==
22 Yards is about a successful sports agent and his fall from grace. The film delves into the commercial aspects of sports. Barun Sobti plays the lead, a cricket enthusiast and a talent manager.

== Cast ==
- Barun Sobti as Ron Sen
- Amartya Ray as Shome Ray
- Panchi Bora as Shonali
- Rajit Kapur as Dr. Zahid Khan
- Rajesh Sharma as Ravi Khanna
- Chaiti Ghoshal as Trishna Ray
- Geetika Tyagi as Rica Sahay

== Release and reception ==
22 Yards had its world premiere at the inaugural Bay Area South Asian Film Festival (BASAFF 2018) where Barun Sobti bagged the Best Actor (Feature) award. The film was slated to release on 22 February 2019, but was then pushed back to 15 March 2019.

The official trailer of the film was released on 18 January 2019.

=== Critical response ===
Nandini Ramnath in Scroll.in writes, "Barun Sobti scores in a familiar cricketing tale of failure and redemption."

News 18 gave the movie two stars out of five and wrote 'an average film that gives a simplistic insight in to the crafty world of Cricket'.

== Soundtrack ==
22 Yards

Soundtrack album by Amartya Ray, Amartya Bobo Rahut
- Released: 15 February 2019
- Recorded: 2018
- Genre: Feature film soundtrack
- Length: 18:19
- Language: Hindi
- Label: Zee Music Company
External audio
- Official Audio Jukebox on YouTube

The music of the film has been composed by Amartya Ray and Amartya Bobo Rahut while the lyrics have been written by Amartya Ray and Siddhant Kaushal.

Track listing
No.	Title	Singer(s)	Length
1.	"Bande Daud"	Siddharth Mahadevan	3:58
2.	"Ruk Ja Nadeem"	Amit Mishra	5:11
3.	"Sanjheya"	Nikhita Gandhi and Pardeep Singh Sran	3:50
4.	"Ruk Ja Nadeem (Amartya Ray version)"	Amartya Ray	5:11
Total length:			18:19
