= Sanak =

2021 action thriller film by Kanishk Varma

- Official release poster
- Directed by: Kanishk Varma
- Written by: Ashish Prakash Verma
- Produced by: Vipul Amrutlal Shah; Aashin A. Shah
- Starring: Vidyut Jammwal; Rukmini Maitra; Neha Dhupia; Chandan Roy Sanyal
- Cinematography: Pratik Deora
- Edited by: Sanjay Sharma
- Music by: Songs: Chirantan Bhatt; Jeet Gannguli; Background Score: Saurabh Bhalerao
- Production companies: Zee Studios; Sunshine Pictures
- Distributed by: Disney+ Hotstar
- Release date: 15 October 2021
- Running time: 117 minutes
- Country: India
- Language: Hindi

Sanak (transl. Madness) is a 2021 Indian Hindi-language action thriller film directed by Kanishk Varma and produced by Zee Studios and Sunshine Pictures. It stars Vidyut Jammwal, Rukmini Maitra, Neha Dhupia and Chandan Roy Sanyal.

Principal photography began in January 2021.

Sanak was digitally released in Disney+ Hotstar on 15 October 2021 to mixed reviews from critics.

== Plot ==
Vivaan Ahuja, a skilled MMA trainer, learns that his wife Anshika Maitra's heart can stop at any time and an operation is required. The operation is successful. As Anshika recovers in the hospital, a terrorist group led by Saju Solanki attack the hospital to retrieve their illegal arms dealer and leader Ajay Pal Singh, who was actually responsible for the deaths of 18 INA soldiers due to his supply of faulty weapons and was moved to the hospital for emergency surgery after his pacemaker was tampered in prison. The hospital patients are taken hostage, including Anshika, while Ajay is unconscious under anesthesia after his surgery. ACP Jayati Bhargav and her team are tasked to free the hostages.

Vivaan, who is just leaving after visiting Anishka is in the hospital basement, oblivious to the invasion until he is attacked by one of the terrorists, where he manages to kill him. Shocked, Vivan takes the black pouch belonging to the terrorist, which contains a walkie talkie and a remote detonator and sneaks back into the hospital. Vivaan meets a hospital guard named Riyaz and a child named Zubin who had been hiding, and befriends them. Jayati is stunned to see that her daughter Aanya is being used by the terrorists, strapped to a bomb. Saju blackmails her, saying that he will blow up the hospital unless she supplies a chopper and a bus to them. Jayathi agrees, but secretly plans to attack them.

Vivaan learns about the hospital's layout with Riyaz's help and plans to attack the hospital's control room so that Saju can't see him coming. Vivan is attacked again but with Zubin's help, he kills the terrorist. The bodies of both terrorists are found and Saju orders Vivaan to be killed. Vivaan manages to contact Jayati intermittently and informs her about Saju. Vivan continues to kill and evade the terrorists stationed around each floor and is finally able to take control of the control room with Riyaz and Zubin. Vivan frees the patients held hostage on the ground floor. Saju, who is on the ninth floor realizes that Vivaan is related to one of the hostages and tries to figure out who it is. Unable to do so, Saju kills a nurse to force Vivaan out of hiding. Ajay wakes up and they plan for their escape.

Vivaan realizes during a conversation with Riyaz that Saju was lying to the police; he was never going to use the bus and chopper he had demanded, but rather escape through the sixth floor. He is actually planning to blow up the stairs and the elevator in order to erase evidence by killing the hostages. Vivaan relays this to Jayati, who decides to trust him and play by his information. Jayati and her team enter the hospital where they free Aanya and deactivate the bomb. Vivaan kills Saju's accomplice and finally defeats Saju, who is eventually killed after the falling elevator collapses on him, and Jayati shoots Ajay to death. Jayati thanks Vivaan for his help, remarking that he should be given a medal for his work, but respects his wish to keep his identity away from the media.

== Cast ==
- Vidyut Jammwal as Vivaan Ahuja
- Rukmini Maitra as Anshika Maitra, Vivaan's wife
- Neha Dhupia as ACP Jayati Bhargav, Aanya's mother
- Chandan Roy Sanyal as Captain Saju Solanki
- Chandan Roy as Riyaz Ahmed Motlekar
- Kiran Karmarkar as Ajay Pal Singh
- Sunil Kumar Palwal as Raman, Saju's right-hand man
- Daniele Balconi as Yuri
- Ivy Haralson as Taira
- Alois Knapps as Maksym
- Du Tran Au as Chad
- Harminder Singh Alag as Zubin
- Adrija Sinha as Aanya Bhargav, Jayathi's daughter
- Neha Pednekar as Anuradha
- Tanguy Guinchard as Gunnar
- Sefa Demirbus as Jesper
- Felix Fukoyoshi as Andy
- Dimitri Vujicic as KP
- Shreyal Shetty as Pasha
- Sanjay Kulkarni as Godbole
- Karthikesh as Parma
- Asif Ali Beg as Dr. Pajwani
- Arjun Ramesh as Aditya
- Sudhanva Deshpande as Dr. Sinha
- Karan Verma aa Raghav Chaturvedi
- Anand Alkunte as ASP Rakesh Jadhav

== Reception ==
=== Critical response ===
Sanak received mixed reviews from critics.

Bollywood Hungama gave 2.5/5 stars and wrote "Sanak majorly rests on Vidyut Jammwal's presence and the novel and exciting action scenes." Archika Khurana of The Times of India gave 2.5/5 stars and wrote "Overall, Vidyut Jammwal's slick kicks, punches and backflips raise the stakes of this action-packed drama." Shubham Kulkarni of Koimoi gave 2.5/5 stars and wrote "Vidyut Jammwal is the biggest reason to watch Sanak, but cannot be the only attention-grabbing point of the feature length film. Udita Jhunjhunwala of Firstpost gave 2/5 stars and wrote "Sanak over-emphasizes the action, leaving the story and the emotional core under-developed."

== Soundtrack ==
Sanak

Soundtrack album by Chirantan Bhatt and Jeet Gannguli
- Released: 12 October 2021
- Recorded: 2021
- Genre: Feature film soundtrack
- Length: 14:08
- Language: Hindi
- Label: Zee Music Company

Official audio
- Sanak - Full Album on YouTube

The film's music was composed by Chirantan Bhatt and Jeet Gannguli while lyrics written by Sameer Anjaan, Manoj Yadav and Rashmi Virag.

The song "O Yaara Dil Lagana" is a remake of the song of same name from the 1996 film Agni Sakshi sung by Kavita Krishnamurthy, composed by Nadeem–Shravan and written by Sameer Anjaan.

Track listing
No.	Title	Lyrics	Music	Singer(s)	Length
1.	"O Yaara Dil Lagana"	Sameer Anjaan, Manoj Yadav	Chirantan Bhatt	Stebin Ben, Deeksha Toor	3:34
2.	"Suna Hai"	Rashmi Virag	Jeet Gannguli	Jubin Nautiyal	3:13
3.	"Ankhein Mili"	Manoj Yadav	Chirantan Bhatt	Raj Barman	4:06
4.	"Suna Hai" (Female version)	Rashmi Virag	Jeet Gannguli	Shreya Ghoshal	3:15
Total length:					14:08
