= Manu Rishi =

Indian actor (born 1971)

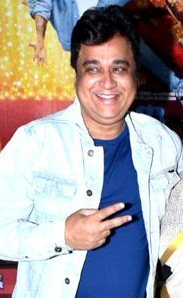
- Rishi at the special screening of Shubh Mangal Zyada Saavdhan
- Born: Manu Rishi Chadha; 3 January 1971 (age 55); New Delhi, India
- Education: Cambridge School, New Delhi
- Occupations: Script and dialogue writer, actor
- Years active: 2002-present
- Spouse: Roli Chaturvedi (m. 2013)
- Children: 2

Manu Rishi Chadha (born 3 January 1971) is an Indian actor, lyricist, script and dialogue writer who works in Hindi films. Rishi is trained under theatre director Arvind Gaur for six years. He won the Filmfare Best Dialogue Award in 2009 for Oye Lucky! Lucky Oye! He also won the IIFA Best Dialogue Award for Oye Lucky! Lucky Oye!.

== Career ==
Manu Rishi Chadha started his acting career in Delhi with the Asmita theatre group. He has acted in more than 40 plays with director Arvind Gaur. His major plays are Girish Karnad's Rakt Kalyan, Mahesh Dattani's Final Solutions, Swadesh Deepak's Court Martial, William Shakespeare's Julius Caesar, Dharamvir Bharati's Andha Yug, Dario Fo's Accidental Death of an Anarchist and Eugene O'Neill's Desire Under the Elms.

In 2001, he moved to Mumbai. His first film in Bollywood as an actor was Saathiya in which he played the role of a doctor. He has appeared in more than 25 films.

== Filmography ==
=== Films ===
Year	Title	Role	Contributed As	Notes & Awards
2002	Saathiya	Doctor	Actor	
2003	Raghu Romeo	Zahid	Actor	
2006	Mixed Doubles	Zoravar	Actor	
2007	Ek Chalis Ki Last Local	Jeetiya	Actor	
2008	Oye Lucky! Lucky Oye!	Bangali	Actor, Lyricist, Dialogues	Won - Filmfare Award for Best Dialogue Won - IIFA Award for Best Dialogue
2008	Mithya	Nayak	Actor	
2010	Chance Pe Dance	Tina's Friend	Writer, Additional Dialogues, Actor	
2010	Aisha		Dialogues	
2010	Band Baaja Baaraat	Inspector	Guest appearance	
2010	Phas Gaye Re Obama	Anandprakash "Anni" Rastogi	Actor	
2010	10 Ml Love	Hanuman in Ram Lila	Actor	
2011	Soundtrack	Doctor M.R. Chadha	Actor	
2012	Life Ki Toh Lag Gayi	A.C.P. Rajveer Singh Choutala	Actor	
2012	Ekk Deewana Tha	Anay	Actor, Dialogues	
2013	What The Fish	Ravi	Actor	
2013	Kirchiyaan	Minister	Actor, Dialogue	Short Film
2014	Kya Dilli Kya Lahore	Samarth Pratap Shastri	Actor, Dialogue, Writer	
2014	Ankhon Dekhi	Sharmaji	Actor	Screen Best Ensemble Cast Award
2014	Ekkees Toppon Ki Salaami	Shekhar Joshi	Actor	
2015	Tanu Weds Manu Returns	Manu's Lawyer	Actor	
2018	Nanu Ki Jaanu	Dabbu	Writer/Actor	
2018	Rajma Chawal	Mittal	Actor	
2019	Pati Patni Aur Woh	Inspector Mukhtar Singh	Actor	
2019	The Zoya Factor	Jogpal	Actor	
2019	Setters	Balam	Actor	
2020	Shubh Mangal Zyada Saavdhan	Chaman Tripathi	Actor	
2020	Doordarshan	Sunil Bhateja aka Chiku	Actor	
2020	Angrezi Medium	Bheluram Bansal	Actor	
2020	What Are The Odds	Rimpu	Actor	
2020	Laxmii	Deepak Rajput	Actor	Disney Plus Hotstar film
2020	Halahal	Randeep Jha	Actor	
2021	Hum Do Hamare Do	Dr. Sanjeev Mehra	Actor	Disney Plus Hotstar film
2022	Dasvi	Jailer Satpal Tomar	Actor	Netflix film
2022	RK/RKay	Goel	Actor	
2022	Raksha Bandhan	Maternal Uncle	Actor	
2022	Phone Bhoot		Actor	
2023	U-Turn	Indarjeet Singh Dhillon	Actor	Zee5 film
2023	Fukrey 3	Shunda Singh Ahluwalia	Actor	
2023	Bhagwan Bharose		Actor	film
2025	Jassi Weds Jassi	Kartar	Actor	
2026	Rahu Ketu	Churu Lal Sharma	Actor	

=== Web series ===
Year	Title	Role	Platform	Notes
2016	Permanent Roommates	Dr Mudit	YouTube	
2017	Inside Edge	Manoharlal Handa; businessman and owner of Haryana league cricket team	Amazon Prime Video	
2018	Mirzapur	Police IG Dubey	Amazon Prime Video	
2018	Babbar ka Tabbar	Mr. Babbar	ZEE5	
2019	Bhoot Purva	David;Purva's Father	ZEE5	
2021	Candy	Money Ranaut	Voot	
2022	Masoom		Disney+ Hotstar	
2023	United Kacche	Sajjad	ZEE5	
2023	Shehar Lakhot	Rajbir Rangot	Amazon Prime Video	
2025	Mandala Murders	Vishwanath Singh	Netflix	
2026	Operation Safed Sagar	General Pervez Musharraf	Netflix	
