= Raat Jawaan Hai =

- Genre: Comedy; Drama
- Written by: Khyati Anand Puthran
- Directed by: Sumeet Vyas
- Starring: Barun Sobti; Anjali Anand; Priya Bapat
- Country of origin: India
- Original language: Hindi
- No. of episodes: 8

Production
- Producer: Vicky Vijay
- Cinematography: Jay I Patel
- Editor: Namrata Rao
- Camera setup: Multi-camera
- Running time: 29-39 minutes
- Production company: Yamini Pictures Private Limited

Original release
- Network: SonyLIV
- Release: 11 October 2024

Raat Jawaan Hai (transl. The Night Is Young) is an Indian Hindi-language television series directed by Sumeet Vyas and written by Khyati Anand Puthran. Produced under Yamini Pictures Private Limited, starring Barun Sobti, Anjali Anand and Priya Bapat. It is premiered on SonyLIV on 11 October 2024.

== Premise ==
Three friends, Avinash, Suman and Radhika navigate the challenges of parenting and work-life balance in this slice-of-life wholesome comedy.

== Cast ==
- Barun Sobti as Avinash/Avi
- Anjali Anand as Radhika/Radz
- Priya Bapat as Suman
- Vikram Singh Chauhan as Satwinder Singh Gulati/Sattu, Suman's husband
- Priyansh Jora as Rishi, Radhika's husband
- Hasleen Kaur as Swadha, Avinash's wife
- Raayan Nikhil Kanchan as Rahi, Avinash and Swadha's son
- Jia Aman Yagnik as Kadambari, Radhika and Rishi's daughter
- Khushvik Sharma as Eshaan, Suman and Satwinder's son

== Episodes ==
No.	Title	Directed by	Written by	Original release date
1	"Film Dekhne Chalein?"	Sumeet Vyas	Khyati Anand-Puthran	October 11, 2024
2	"Baap ki Baapta"	Sumeet Vyas	Khyati Anand-Puthran	October 11, 2024
3	"Finding Sunita"	Sumeet Vyas	Khyati Anand-Puthran	October 11, 2024
4	"Abadaba Issues"	Sumeet Vyas	Khyati Anand-Puthran	October 11, 2024
5	"Jaale Toh Nahin Lag Gaye?"	Sumeet Vyas	Khyati Anand-Puthran	October 11, 2024
6	"Mercury Retrograde"	Sumeet Vyas	Khyati Anand-Puthran	October 11, 2024
7	"Worst Birthday Ever"	Sumeet Vyas	Khyati Anand-Puthran	October 11, 2024
8	"Sabudana Khichdi"	Sumeet Vyas	Khyati Anand-Puthran	October 11, 2024

== Production ==
The series was announced on SonyLIV. The principal photography of the series commenced in March 2024. A special screening of the series was held at Mumbai on 9 October 2024.

== Reception ==
The series opened to positive reviews, with Arpita Sarkar of OTTPlay rating the series 3/5 stars. Sonal Pandya of Times Now gave the series 4/5 stars. Nandini Ramnath of Scroll.in said in her review that "Fortunately, Raat Jawaan Hai doesn’t bite off more than it can chew, focusing on delivering a carefully prepared feast of laughs, frowns and tears." Troy Ribeiro of The Free Press Journal gave 3.5 stars and said that "If you’re looking for a heartfelt series that embraces the messiness of parenting with open arms, this one’s for you".
