= Shenaz Treasurywala =

Indian actress

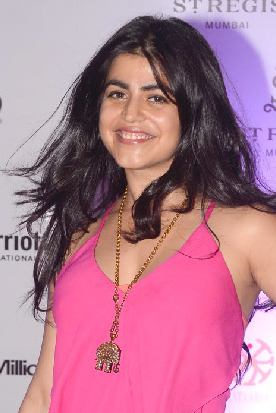
- Treasury in 2018
- Born: Shenaz Treasurywala; Mumbai, Maharashtra, India
- Education: St. Xavier's College, Mumbai
- Occupation: Actress
- Years active: 2001–2021

Shenaz Treasurywala is an Indian actress and travel vlogger.

== Career ==
Discovered by a photographer during her first year in college, her first modeling assignment was for the soft drink Gold Spot. She also did advertising work for Akai and Philips before MTV Networks Asia hired her to work as a VJ on the MTV's Most Wanted program.

Her acting debut was in the 2001 Telugu film Eduruleni Manishi, followed by the 2003 Bollywood film Ishq Vishk, which earned her a nomination for the best supporting actress award by the Filmfare Film Awards. With her lifelong love of travel, she wrote travel articles for Cosmopolitan, Elle, and Femina. As of the early 2010s, Treasurywala resides in Mumbai, India and serves as the host of Culture Shock on the Travel Channel. In 2011, she got a recurring role as Rama Patel on the American soap opera One Life to Live. A few months later, she signed a contract with the show until its cancellation in 2012 and then returned as a contract player when the show started airing its webisodes in 2013.

Treasury returned to India to visit her family and was offered a leading role in Ishq Vishk after meeting director Ken Ghosh at a Mumbai night club.

In 2009, she appeared in the films Aagey Se Right and Radio. She wrote the screenplay for and appeared in the 2011 movie Luv Ka The End. She also appeared in the movie Delhi Belly. She is part of the film Main Aur Mr. Riight.

During 2015, she was a contributor and occasional panelist on The Nightly Show with Larry Wilmore on Comedy Central in the United States.

In 2017, she appeared in the critically acclaimed indie film The Big Sick where she played Kumail Nanjiani's sister-in-law.

She has also hosted All Women Special Wrestling Event "WWE Evolution" on 28 October 2018. In addition to acting, she has now started to share her travel vlogs on YouTube and Instagram.

== Social activism ==
In December 2014, days before the release of her film Main Aur Mr. Riight (on 12 December), Shenaz Treasurywala wrote an open letter to the most powerful people of India including Narendra Modi, Sachin Tendulkar, Amitabh Bachchan, Salman Khan, Shah Rukh Khan, Aamir Khan and Anil Ambani on women's safety in India.

== Personal life ==
Her father is a merchant marine engineer, and she was born in a Parsi family. Treasurywala attended school and college in Mumbai, St. Xavier's College. In 2001, she moved to New York City where she studied method acting at the Lee Strasberg Theatre and Film Institute. While in New York, she also took a writing course at NYU.

== Filmography ==
=== Films ===
Year	Title	Role	Notes
2001	Eduruleni Manishi	Sri	Telugu film, credited as Shenaz
2003	Ishq Vishk	Alisha Sahay	credited as Shenaz
2004	Hum Tum	Shalini	
2006	Umar	Sapna P. Lakha	Credited as Shenaz Treasurywala
2009	Aagey Se Right	Pearl	Credited as Shenaz Treasurywala
2009	Radio	Shanaya Dhingra	Credited as Shenaz Treasurywala
2011	Luv Ka The End	Ms. Naaz	Credited as Shenaz Treasurywala
2011	Delhi Belly	Sonia Mehra	
2014	Main Aur Mr. Riight	Aliya Raj	
2017	The Big Sick	Fatima	
2017	Munna Michael	Anchor	
2018	Kaalakaandi	Ayesha	
2021	Americanish	Ameera	American film

=== Television ===
Year	Title	Role	Ref.
1999–2001	MTV Most Wanted	Herself (Host/VJ)	
2007	Culture Shock	Herself/host	
2011–2013	One Life to Live	Rama Patel	
2015	The Nightly Show with Larry Wilmore	Contributor	
2016	Brown Nation	Dimple Parikh	
2018	WWE Raw Sunday Dhamaal	Herself/host	
