= Ribbon (film) =

- Directed by: Rakhee Sandilya
- Screenplay by: Rajeev Upadhyay; Rakhee Sandilya
- Story by: Sudhakar Nilmani 'Eklavya'
- Produced by: Prakash Mondal; Swathi Mondal
- Starring: Kalki Koechlin; Sumeet Vyas; Hitesh Malhan
- Cinematography: Vikram Amladi
- Edited by: Rajeev Upadhyay
- Music by: Sagar Desai; Mikey McCleary
- Production company: Red Cart Films
- Release date: 3 November 2017
- Running time: 109 minutes
- Country: India
- Language: Hindi
- Box office: ₹5.3 million

Ribbon is a 2017 Indian Hindi-language drama film directed by Rakhee Sandilya in her feature film debut. It stars Kalki Koechlin and Sumeet Vyas in lead roles. The film was released on 3 November 2017.

== Plot ==
Ribbon tells the story of Sahana and Karan, a married couple navigating the challenges of an unplanned pregnancy. Sahana, an executive at a company, finds her career derailed when the pregnancy leads to her losing her job. After being demoted during her maternity leave, she is eventually fired when she requests just three days off. As the couple struggles to balance work and family life, they are confronted with a harrowing situation: their daughter is being abused by her bus driver. The film sheds light on the difficulties working parents face in managing their professional and personal lives.

== Cast ==
- Sumeet Vyas as Karan Mehra
- Kalki Koechlin as Sahana Mehra
- Hitesh Malhan as Sardar
- Baby Kierra Soni as Aashi
- Purnanand Wandekar as Shibu
- Kalyani Mulay as Usha

== Production ==
Filming for the project was completed in June 2017.

== Key Partners ==
- Music: T-Series
- Career: Sheroes
- Pregnancy App: Ango Health
- Digital Media: First Post

== Screenings ==
Special screening of the movie was arranged in Mumbai on 2 November 2017.

== Soundtrack ==
Ribbon

Soundtrack album by Mikey Mccleary & Sagar Desai
- Released: 1 November 2017
- Genre: Feature film soundtrack
- Length: 6:48
- Label: T-Series

Tracklist
No.	Title	Lyrics	Music	Singer(s)	Length
1.	"Charkha Ghoom Raha Hai"	Dr. Sagar	Mikey McCleary	Aniket Mangrulkar	03:08
2.	"Har Mod Par Umeed Hai"	Puneet Sharma	Sagar Desai	Jasleen Royal	03:40

== Reception ==
=== Critical response ===
Pallabi Dey Purkayastha of The Times of India gave the film a rating of 3 star out of 5 and said that, "All in all, Ribbon starts off with one storyline and ends with another, but fails to capture the gamut of both. Rakhee Sandilya has started a conversation on a less-spoken human emotion, very humanely. If only she had taken one route and explored it to its optimum level." Kriti Tulsiani of News 18 gave the film a rating of 3 stars out of 5 saying that, "At a time when Bollywood is journeying away from the usual potboilers, a film like Ribbon is more than welcome. It addresses subjects that Bollywood and even parents sometimes shy away from addressing to their children. So even if the film is a little bland and a little uneven per se, Ribbon makes for a better watch than most of the no-brainers today."

Sweta Kausal of Hindustan Times gave the film a rating of 2.5 stars out of 5 and said that "Ribbon rakes up a lot of issues that deserve at least a discourse in the current scenario, but instead, ends up only fleetingly touching these. Neither the characters nor the narrative take upon the evils and the evil-doers." Shubhra Gupta of The Indian Express gave the film a rating of 2.5 stars out of 5 and said that, "Koechlin leaves a mark as a harried professional, reluctant mom, and a good wife. Vyas is competent too. Some thorny issues are brought up: the troubles that women face at workplaces, the having to outsource child-care, the predators that lurk in the most unexpected places. But as often as the film astutely touches upon the tough choices, and the problems that can crop up, it leaves them, and us, hanging. You are left wanting a little more."
