= Main Aur Mr. Riight =

Main Aur Mr.Riight
- Official promotional poster
- Directed by: Adeeb Rais
- Produced by: Pooja Gujral
- Starring: Barun Sobti; Shenaz Treasury; Kavi Shastri; Varun Khandelwal; Danny Sura; Neha Gosain
- Music by: Bappi Lahiri
- Distributed by: Madmidaas Films
- Release date: 12 December 2014
- Running time: 130 minutes
- Country: India
- Language: Hindi

Main Aur Mr. Riight (transl. Me and Mr. Right) is a 2014 Indian romantic drama directed by Adeeb Rais. The film stars Shenaz Treasury and Barun Sobti as the lead pair. Main Aur Mr. Riight tells the story of a single girl in search of her Mr. Right. The film was released on 12 December 2014.

== Plot ==
Alia Raj is a popular casting director in Mumbai, who believes she has the perfect life, perfect friends, and perfect personality; therefore she needs the perfect guy, her own Mr. Right. All her friends, Rahul and Niyati, Abhay and Diya, and Shaunit and Bani are married, dating and engaged respectively. They constantly try to match make for her, and make fun of her nitpicking when it does not work out for frivolous reasons, as her standards are high. Sick of her friends trying to control her life, Alia decides to take things into her hands.

Enter Sukhwinder Singh a.k.a. Sukhi, born in Punjab and raised in Delhi, an aspiring actor who has not gotten his break in movies yet. He is a loud, dramatic, goofy but sweet boy who is a die-hard Salman Khan fan. Alia makes a deal with Sukhi; play the role of her fictional boyfriend, in exchange for money and a role in a movie. She trains and moulds him into her ideal version of Mr. Right, a fictional guy named Hridaan Dalmiya, to get her friends off her back for some time. Sukhi, who is actually the complete opposite of Alia's image of her ideal Mr. Right, takes some time to get into the role, but wins the heart of all of Alia's friends. Eventually Alia warms up to him as well and they become good friends.

As time goes by, Sukhi's authenticity makes Alia's friends slowly take cognizance of the cracks in their own respective relationships. During a drink-and-truth game at a bar, Diya, who is dating Abhay, reveals that she has fallen in love with Hridaan. Abhay leaves, furious. Alia confronts him, and he reveals that he has feelings for Alia. Alia decides to secretly start dating Abhay, as she feels he matches all traits of her perfect Mr. Right.

At Sukhi's farewell dinner, tensions arise as Rahul and Niyati's marriage is on the brink of breaking, and Shaunit reveals that he does not want to be a father to a pregnant Bani. After an incident with Sukhi's old friend who mistakenly calls him by his real name, revealing his original profession, Alia's friends realize that he is not Hridaan but Sukhi, hired by Alia as a make-believe boyfriend. Feeling betrayed and dismayed at how all their relationships have fallen apart since Sukhi's arrival into their lives, they all, except Abhay, storm off, abandoning Alia.

Sukhi, who has by now developed feelings for Alia, sees Abhay consoling Alia and realizes they are together. Heartbroken, he leaves, tearing his paycheck. All the friends drift apart. Over time, Alia realizes that she is not in love with Abhay and that she misses being her actual, non-curated self with Sukhi. She goes to visit him, confessing that she misses him, only to be dismissed by him. Disheartened, Alia breaks up with Abhay, thinking of giving up on her search for Mr. Right.

Eventually, she realizes she has also fallen in love with Sukhi. Alia and Sukhi reunite as he auditions for her movie. Finally, Alia reflects that Mr. Right is not found from a rigid checklist. He is simply the person who makes you happy and around whom you can freely be yourself.

== Cast ==
- Barun Sobti as Sukhwinder Singh a.k.a. Sukhi/Hridaan Dalmiya
- Shenaz Treasury as Alia Raj
- Varun Khandelwal as Rahul
- Kavi Shastri as Shaunit
- Danny Sura as Abhay
- Maia Sethna as Diya
- Anagha Mane as Bani
- Neha Gosain as Niyati

== Tracks ==
No.	Title	Artist(s)	Length
1.	"Yaar Bina Chain Kaha Re"	Bappi Lahiri & Hema Sardesai	2:16
2.	"Desi Daru"	Jasbir Jassi	1:37
3.	"Khuda Khair"	Shibani Kashyap	1:48
4.	"Bhool Na Jaana"	Farhan Saeed	4:19
5.	"Pyaon Pyaon"	Ravi Shukla & Mizee	4:13
6.	"Tatti Wao Na Laggayee"	Pooja Gujral	1:04

== Reception ==
Shubhra Gupta of The Indian Express gave the film 1.5 stars out of 5, writing, "Barun Sobti gets the hungry-actor look right, but the smiley Shenaz Treasurywala needed to be deeper". The Hindu wrote, "A livewire, Shehnaz has finally got a film to showcase her talent and she doesn’t disappoint as the prim and proper girl who feels she is sorted but is actually not. She fumbles when the character demands more depth but is consistently fun to watch. Barun is not bad either but they have been saddled with a material that has long lost its bite. Even the tribute to Anil Kapoor-Amrita Singh starrer "Yaar Bina Chain Kaha Re" (Saaheb) fail to generate goose bumps. It only makes you miss an era when even tripe was stirred well." Paloma Sharma of Rediff.com gave the film half star out of 5, writing, "Barun Sobti fares better than his costars in the acting department. Main aur Mr Riight is a tad too pretentiously philosophical to be taken seriously." Bollywood Hungama gave the film 1.5 stars out of 5, writing, "On the whole, Main aur Mr Riight can be avoided without any regrets.
