= Sumeet Vyas =

Indian actor

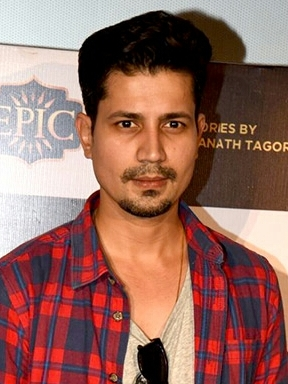
- Vyas in 2015
- Born: July 23, 1983 (age 43); Jodhpur, Rajasthan, India
- Occupations: Actor; screenwriter; film director
- Spouses: Shivani Tanksale (m. 2010; div. 2017) Ekta Kaul (m. 2018)
- Children: 1

Sumeet Vyas (born 27 July 1983) is an Indian actor, film director and screenwriter who works in Indian films and television. His breakthrough role was as Mikesh Chaudhary in TVF's 2014 web series Permanent Roommates. Vyas has since played supporting roles in films including English Vinglish, Parched and Guddu Ki Gun, and Veere Di Wedding. He had his first starring role in 2016 drama film Ribbon; his performance was well received by critics. Apart from acting in films and television programmes, Vyas also appears in theatre productions in India.

== Early life ==
Vyas was born in Jodhpur, Rajasthan to writer B.M Vyas and Sudha Vyas. He spent his initial years there before moving to Mumbai to pursue his passion for acting and writing. He has attended R.D. National College, Mumbai. During his school days, Sumeet aspired to become a pilot or a computer engineer. But, he had a passion for acting and writing also. Later, choosing the second option, he gave up his college studies and started working as an assistant editor in an editing studio in Mumbai.

== Career ==
Vyas made his acting debut with a small role in the Doordarshan television show Woh Huye Na Humare. He then starred in Rehna Hai Teri Palkon Ki Chhaon Mein as Kartik Pratapsingh, opposite Amrapali Dubey, which was his first success.

Vyas had his career breakthrough with the 2014 series Permanent Roommates, where he starred opposite Nidhi Singh. It tell the story about two people in long distance who eventually consider marriage. Permanent Roommates marked India's first web series to be released.

Vyas achieved critical acclaim and recognition with his portrayal of the eldest sibling Chandan, in the 2016 series TVF Tripling. Expanded over three seasons, the series set a benchmark of success in Indian branded content and has since developed a cult status. Vyas also worked as the co-writer for the series. Reviewing Season 2, Devki Nehra of Firstpost noted, "The lead actors' performances are the saving grace of the show. Vyas is adorable as the elder brother, the voice of reason for his younger siblings." He starred in a web campaign by BigRock in 2017.

Vyas made his debut as a director with Raat Jawaan Hai, in 2024. Nandini Ramnath stated, "Fortunately, the series doesn’t bite off more than it can chew, focusing on delivering a carefully prepared feast of laughs, frowns and tears, owing to Vyas’s attentiveness to the staging and performances." The series earned him a Filmfare OTT Award.

== Personal life ==
Vyas married actress Shivani Tanksale in 2010. After 7 years of marriage, the couple got divorced in 2017. Vyas married actress Ekta Kaul on 15 September 2018. They have a son, Ved, born in 2020.

== Filmography ==
=== Films ===
Year	Title	Role	Notes	Ref.
2007	Maamu Tension Nai Leneka	Prince Salim		
2009	Jashnn	Unknown		
2011	Aarakshan	Sunny Kantaprasad		
2012	English Vinglish	Salman Khan		
2013	Aurangzeb	S. I. Vishnu Sharma		
2013	Kajarya	Nikhil		
2014	Blouse	Shyam	Short film	
2015	Sabki Bajegi Band	Amit		
2015	All Is Well	Ronny		
2015	Parched	Kishan		
2015	Guddu Ki Gun	Laddoo		
2017	Maroon	Ashish Bharadwaj		
2017	Ribbon	Karan Mehra		
2018	Veere Di Wedding	Rishabh Malhotra		
2018	High Jack	Rakesh		
2019	Made in China	Devraj		
2020	Unpaused	Sahil Khanna	Segment: "Apartment"	
2023	Chhatriwali	Rishi Kalra		
2023	Mrs Undercover	The Common Man		
2023	Afwaah	Vikram Singh "Vicky Bana"		
2023	Sajini Shinde Ka Viral Video	Lalit Pandit		
2025	Detective Sherdil	Angad Bhatti		

=== Television ===
Year	Title	Role	Notes	Ref.
2006	Woh Hue Na Hamare	Sameer Damania		
2007–2008	Kasamh Se	Daksh Randheria		
2009–2010	Rehna Hai Teri Palkon Ki Chhaon Mein	Kartik Pratapsingh		
2011–2012	Chandragupta Maurya	Ambhi Kumar		
2015	Laut Aao Trisha	Advocate Vynavin "VK" Kumar		
2015	Stories by Rabindranath Tagore	Bihari	Episode: "Chokher Bali"	
2016	Comedy Nights Bachao	Himself	Guest appearance	

=== Web series ===
Year	Title	Role	Notes	Ref.
2014–2023	Permanent Roommates	Mikesh Chaudhary		
2015	Bang Baaja Baaraat	Choreographer Twisty	Also writer	
2016–2022	TVF Tripling	Chandan Sharma	Also writer	
2016	Official Chukyagiri	D-Sir		
2018	Official CEOgiri	Dilawar "D-Sir"		
2018	The Story	Himself		
2019	RejctX	Farhan Hussain		
2019	Parchhayee	Jayant		
2019	The Verdict – State vs Nanavati	Ram Jethmalani		
2020	Official Bhootiyagiri	Dilawar Rana		
2020	Wakaalat From Home	Sujin Kohli		
2020	Dark 7 White	Yudhveer Singh Rathore		
2021	Aapkey Kamrey Mein Koi Rahta Hai	Nikhil		
2021	1962: The War in the Hills	Jemadar Ram Kumar		
2022	Jugaadistan	Gaurav Bhati		
2022	Teerandaz	Aditya Dutta		
2023	Jaanbaaz Hindustan Ke	Tariq		
2023	Bambai Meri Jaan	Ganya Surve		
2023	Tankesh Diaries	Mikesh Chaudhary		
2024	Zindaginama	Keith Braganza	Episode: "Caged"	
2026	Chumbak	Aditya Khanna		
2026	Shaque: Trust No One	Dr. Bhaskar		

=== Other appearances ===
Year	Title	Director	Screenwriter	Notes	Ref.
2014	Haircut	Yes	Yes	Short film	
2016-2022	TVF Tripling	Yes	No		
2018	Love per Square Foot	No	Yes		
2024	Raat Jawaan Hai	Yes	No		

== Awards and nominations ==
Year	Award	Category	Work	Result	Ref.
2017	Asian Television Awards	Best Scriptwriting – Web Series	TVF Tripling	Won	
2019	IReel Awards	Best Writing – Comedy	TVF Tripling	Nominated	
2025	Critics' Choice Awards	Best Director – Series	Raat Jawaan Hai	Nominated	
2025	Filmfare OTT Awards	Best Comedy – Series	Raat Jawaan Hai	Won	
