= Bhumi Pednekar =

Indian actress (born 1989)

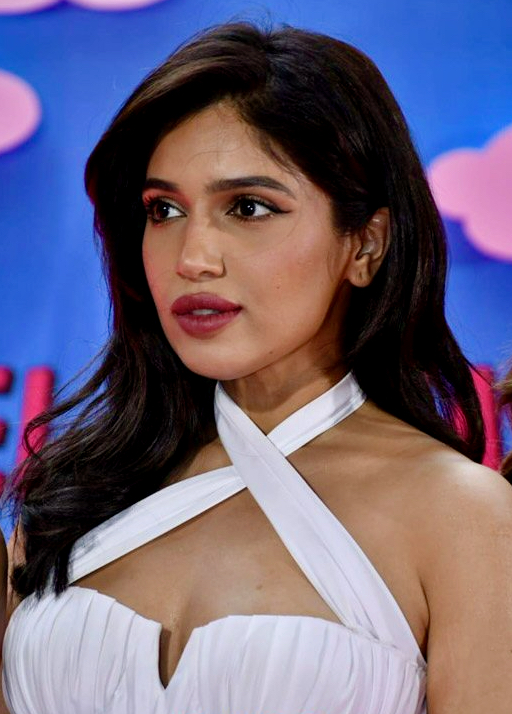
- Pednekar in 2023
- Born: 18 July 1989 (age 37); Bombay, Maharashtra, India
- Occupation: Actress
- Years active: 2015–present
- Father: Satish Pednekar
- Awards: Full list

Bhumi Satish Pednekar (Hindi pronunciation: [bʱuːmɪ peːɖneːkər] born 18 July 1989) is an Indian actress who works in Hindi films. Known for her portrayals of headstrong small-town women, she is the recipient of several awards, including three Filmfare Awards.

After working as an assistant casting director at Yash Raj Films for six years, she made her film debut as an overweight bride in the company's romantic comedy Dum Laga Ke Haisha (2015), which earned her the Filmfare Award for Best Female Debut. She rose to prominence starring in the commercially successful films Toilet: Ek Prem Katha (2017), Shubh Mangal Saavdhan (2017), Bala (2019), and Pati Patni Aur Woh (2019). For her performances as the septuagenarian sharpshooter Chandro Tomar in Saand Ki Aankh (2019) and a closeted lesbian in Badhaai Do (2022), she twice won the Filmfare Critics Award for Best Actress. She has since starred in the social dramas Bheed (2023), Afwaah (2023), and Bhakshak (2024). Her subsequent theatrical releases have all failed commercially.

Off-screen, Pednekar is an environmentalist, and as of 2023, raises awareness on climate change for the United Nations Development Programme.

== Early life ==
Pednekar was born in Bombay (now Mumbai) on 18 July 1989, Her father Satish Pednekar, a Konkani with ancestral roots in Pernem, Goa was an MLA and Home and Labour Minister of Maharashtra. Her mother Sumitra Hooda Pednekar, a Haryanvi, worked as an anti-tobacco activist after the death of her husband from oral cancer. Bhumi has a younger sister named Samiksha, who is a lawyer and a model. She did her schooling from Arya Vidya Mandir in Juhu. At the age of 15, her parents took out a study loan for her to study acting at Whistling Woods International, but she was expelled due to poor attendance. Within a year and a half, she joined Yash Raj Films as an assistant casting director, and paid off the loan. She went on to work with the company for six years under Shanoo Sharma.

== Career ==
=== Early work and recognition (2015–2019) ===
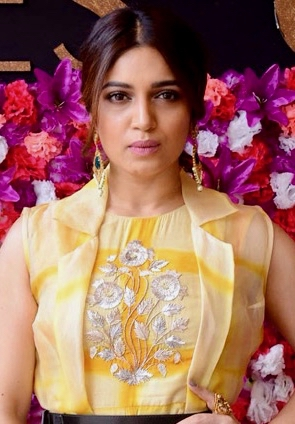
Pednekar in 2017

Pednekar's acting debut came as the overweight wife of Ayushmann Khurrana's character in the Yash Raj Films-produced and Sharat Katariya-directed romantic comedy Dum Laga Ke Haisha (2015). In preparation, she gained almost 12 kg body weight. Rajeev Masand reviewed, "Pednekar steals the film with an assured turn, effortlessly making you care for Sandhya, without ever reducing her to a slobbering, self-pitying caricature." After filming, she began losing weight and shared methods and tips of the process through her social media. A commercial success, Dum Laga Ke Haisha won the National Film Award for Best Feature Film in Hindi and earned Pednekar the Filmfare Award for Best Female Debut. That year she was featured in Y-Films's four part mini web series Man's World. Based on the subject of gender inequality, it digitally premiered on YouTube.

Two years later, Pednekar was cast in the satire Toilet: Ek Prem Katha (2017) as a young woman in rural India who insists on the eradication of open defecation, opposite Akshay Kumar. Despite disliking the story, Saibal Chatterjee of NDTV praised her for "flesh[ing] out a refreshingly relatable college topper who becomes the principal catalyst for a mini-revolution". With a worldwide gross of over ₹3 billion (US$32 million), it emerged as one of the highest-grossing Hindi films of the year and Pednekar's biggest grosser. Later that year, her performance opposite Khurrana in Shubh Mangal Saavdhan, a satire on erectile dysfunction, earned Pednekar her first nomination for the Filmfare Award for Best Actress. Reviewing the film for The Indian Express, Shubhra Gupta wrote that Pednekar "once again reminds us just how convincing she can be as a real honest-to-goodness young woman in search of love", but bemoaned that she was being typecast in such roles. Shubh Mangal Saavdhan grossed ₹700 million (US$7.5 million) worldwide. Zoya Akhtar's segment in the Netflix anthology film Lust Stories marked Pednekar's sole screen appearance of 2018; she played a maid who has an affair with her employer. Writing for NDTV, Raja Sen considered Akhtar's segment to be the best in the anthology, and found Pednekar "hauntingly good" in it.

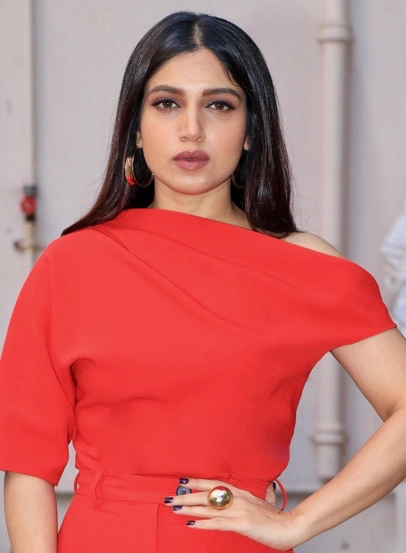
Pednekar in 2019

Abhishek Chaubey's crime drama Sonchiriya was Pednekar's first release of 2019. She played a young housewife on the run in rural Chambal, alongside Sushant Singh Rajput and Manoj Bajpayee. In preparation, she underwent two and a half months of physical training to portray her character's mannerism and gait; she also learned to fire a gun. Rahul Desai of Film Companion praised the subtlety in the film and its performances, and credited Pednekar for "lend[ing] an inevitable sense of womanhood to the silenced". She next starred as the septuagenarian sharpshooter Chandro Tomar in Tushar Hiranandani's biographical film Saand Ki Aankh, opposite Taapsee Pannu who played her sister-in-law Prakashi Tomar. In preparation, Pannu and Pednekar spent time with the two women and trained in shooting a gun. She suffered from skin allergies from filming in the heat wearing prosthetic make-up. Udita Jhunjunwala of Mint wrote, "Pannu and Pednekar are wonderful and spunky and embrace their parts even though their body language and posture is variable". Both actresses were jointly awarded the Screen Award and Filmfare Critics Award for Best Actress.

Continuing her portrayals of headstrong small-town women, Pednekar starred in Bala and Pati Patni Aur Woh (both 2019). The former marked her third collaboration with Khurrana, in which she played a dark-skinned woman who faces prejudice due to her skin colour. Controversy arose for casting a fair-skinned woman in the role, but Pednekar defended herself by saying that an actor should be allowed to play any part. Pati Patni Aur Woh, a remake of a 1978 film of the same name and co-starring Kartik Aaryan and Ananya Panday, featured her as a housewife with a philandering husband. Anupama Chopra wrote that "it's Bhumi Pednekar's spirited Vedika who lifts the material up a notch. Bhumi has an intelligence that rescues some of the silliest scenes in this film, especially in the climax." Both Bala and Pati Patni Aur Woh were commercially successful, each grossing over ₹1 billion (US$11 million) worldwide.

=== Commercial struggles and streaming projects (2020–present) ===
Dolly Kitty Aur Woh Chamakte Sitare, directed by Alankrita Shrivastava and co-starring Konkona Sen Sharma, was screened at the 24th Busan International Film Festival in 2019 and released on Netflix later in 2020. Nandini Ramnath of Scroll.in wrote that despite doing a "fine job", Pednekar had been overshadowed by her co-star Sen Sharma. Nonetheless, both actresses received nominations for the Filmfare Critics Award for Best Actress. She next had brief roles in the comedy-drama Shubh Mangal Zyada Saavdhan and the horror film Bhoot – Part One: The Haunted Ship. In the same year, Pednekar starred in a remake of the horror film Bhaagamathie, named Durgamati, which was released on Amazon Prime Video. In a scathing review, Rohan Naahar of Hindustan Times disliked the film and Pednekar's performance.

After a year-long absence from the screen, Pednekar starred alongside Rajkummar Rao as gay individuals in a lavender marriage in the comedy-drama Badhaai Do (2022). She was pleased with the opportunity of playing the vulnerable character of a closeted lesbian, as it marked a departure from the strong-willed women she typically played. Rachana Dubey of The Times of India praised the film's handling of LGBT themes and found Pednekar's performance to be "sensitive, nuanced, and on point". She won another Filmfare Critics Award for Best Actress (shared with Tabu for Bhool Bhulaiyaa 2), in addition to her second nomination for the Filmfare Award for Best Actress. She reteamed with Akshay Kumar in Aanand L. Rai's family film Raksha Bandhan. The film was panned for its regressive storytelling and it emerged as a box office bomb. She then appeared in Shashank Khaitan's comic thriller Govinda Naam Mera, co-starring Vicky Kaushal and Kiara Advani, which released on Disney+ Hotstar. Mid-Day's Hiren Kotwani found her "over-the-top" portrayal to be the best performance in a disappointing film.

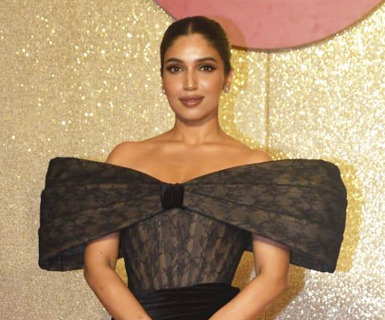
Pednekar in 2023

In 2023, Pednekar reteamed with Rajkummar Rao in Anubhav Sinha's Bheed, a drama in black-and-white about the COVID-19 lockdown in India. Reviewers for Scroll.in and Rediff.com complimented her for ably supporting Rao's performance. She then starred alongside Nawazuddin Siddiqui in Sudhir Mishra's Afwaah, a thriller about fake news. Both Bheed and Afwaah had controversial political themes; they received a limited theatrical release and had poor box office returns. Her next release, the sex comedy Thank You for Coming, premiered at the 2023 Toronto International Film Festival. It marked her first project in which she was cast in an urban setting, but she found it challenging to play a character that came close to her own personality, saying that it required "a lot of [my] own demons [...] to be examined". Comparing her "vibrant comedic performance" to that of stars Carole Lombard and Goldie Hawn, IndieWire's Marya E. Gates found Pednekar's "irrepressible charm" and "overwhelming beauty" to be the highlight in a mediocre film. Though another box office bomb, she received another Best Actress nomination at Filmfare. She then starred opposite Arjun Kapoor in the thriller The Lady Killer. The film was released without principal photography being completed and was only given a small release without any marketing. It became one of the biggest box office bombs of Indian cinema, earning less than ₹1 lakh against a production budget of ₹45 crore.

Pednekar portrayed a journalist in the crime drama Bhakshak, which released on Netflix in 2024. Filmed in 39 days, it is based on the Muzaffarpur shelter case. She described the role as "one of my most mature", causing her to "question my empathy and how I had become so numb towards somebody else’s pain". Shubhra Gupta described her as "earnest" and "believable" in a movie that lacked "basic story-telling". In 2025, Pednekar played a woman with retrograde amnesia in the romantic comedy Mere Husband Ki Biwi, co-starring Arjun Kapoor and Rakul Preet Singh. Sana Farzeen of India Today felt that her "fiery Punjabi character, though fun initially, becomes overbearing after a point". It emerged as Pednekar's seventh consecutive box-office bomb. She next starred as a headstrong business owner who falls in love with a prince (played by Ishaan Khatter) in the romantic drama series The Royals, for Netflix. The series was panned by critics who criticised the chemistry between Pednekar and Khatter. NDTV's Hardika Gupta felt that Pednekar's performance was particularly disappointing as she has shown previously that "she is capable of far more textured performances". In 2026, she led the thriller series Daldal for Amazon Prime Video, which Anuj Kumar of The Hindu termed "an emotionally exhausting slog", where he noted Pednekar to be "emotionally inert".

== Other work and media image ==
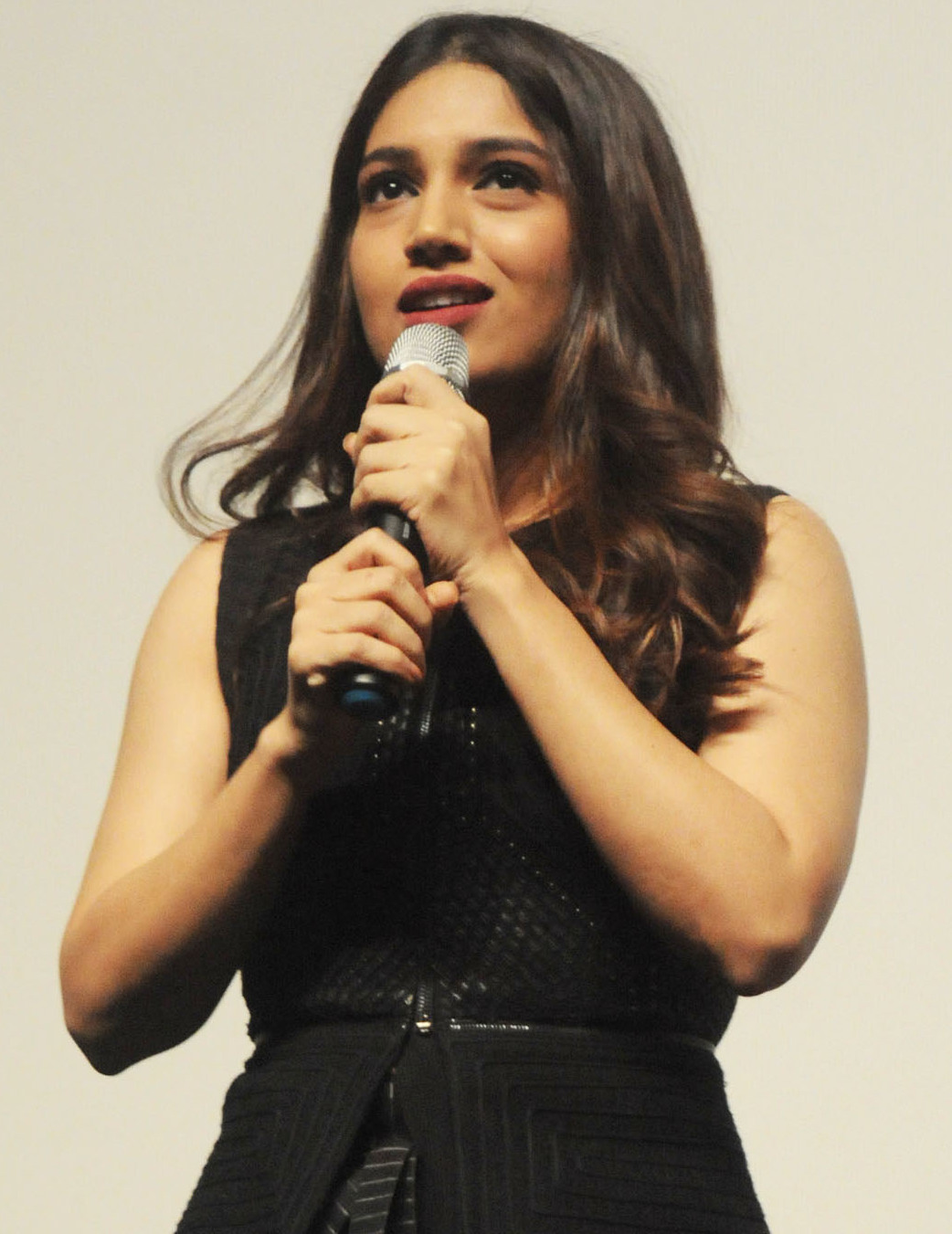
Pednekar in 2017

The journalist Priyanka Roy of The Telegraph wrote in 2019 that Pednekar specialises in playing "women of fortitude with a strong moral fibre, mostly hailing from small towns". She was featured by Forbes India in their 30 Under 30 list of 2018. Pednekar ranked 5th in Rediff.com's "Best Bollywood Actresses" list of 2020. She was featured various times in Times' 50 Most Desirable Women list. She ranked 40th in 2019 and 39th in 2020.

In 2019, Pednekar began a campaign named Climate Warrior to raise awareness on environmental protection and global warming. She is also vocal about issues such as pay parity and has spoken out about the gender pay gap in Bollywood, calling it "insulting" and "heartbreaking". In 2020, she teamed with MTV India for their Nishedh campaign, which aims to create awareness about health issues, including reproductive health, among the youth. She was appointed as the brand ambassador of Nykaa in 2022. In 2023, she was named by the United Nations Development Programme as India's first National Advocate for Sustainable Development Goals, to raise awareness on climate change on social media.

== Controversy ==
In 2026, Pednekar received widespread backlash after criticising the language used by protestors questioning whether abusive language represented India's culture, during the 2026 Delhi Jantar Mantar protests. Internet users reprimanded her for focusing on the language of protesters while remaining silent on the violence they faced during the protests.

== Filmography ==
=== Films ===
†	Denotes films that have not yet been released

Year	Film	Role(s)	Notes	Ref.
2015	Dum Laga Ke Haisha	Sandhya Verma		
2017	Toilet: Ek Prem Katha	Jaya Joshi		
2017	Shubh Mangal Saavdhan	Sugandha Joshi		
2018	Lust Stories	Sudha Maheshwari	Zoya Akhtar's segment	
2019	Sonchiriya	Indumati Tomar		
2019	Saand Ki Aankh	Chandro Dadi		
2019	Bala	Latika Trivedi		
2019	Pati Patni Aur Woh	Vedika "Guddi" Tripathi		
2020	Shubh Mangal Zyada Saavdhan	Devika Bhatt		
2020	Bhoot	Sapna Prakashan	Special appearance	
2020	Dolly Kitty Aur Woh Chamakte Sitare	Kajal "Kitty" Yadav		
2020	Durgamati	Chanchal Chauhan IAS / Durgamati		
2022	Badhaai Do	Suman "Sumi" Singh		
2022	Raksha Bandhan	Sapna Gupta		
2022	Govinda Naam Mera	Gauri Waghmare		
2023	Bheed	Renu Sharma		
2023	Afwaah	Nivedhita "Nivi" Singh		
2023	Thank You for Coming	Kanika Kapoor		
2023	The Lady Killer	Jansey Burman		
2024	Bhakshak	Vaishali Singh		
2024	Khel Khel Mein	Sandhya	Voice appearance	
2025	Mere Husband Ki Biwi	Prabhleen Kaur Dhillon		

=== Television ===
Year	Film	Role(s)	Notes	Ref.
2019	Pyaar Actually	Shreya	Anthology series	
2025	The Royals	Sophia Kanmani Shekhar		
2026	Daldal	DCP Rita Ferreira		
