= Manish Chaudhari =

Indian actor (born 1969)

Manish Prakash Chaudhari
- Other name: Manish Prakash
- Education: M. A. (English)
- Alma mater: University of Delhi
- Occupation: Actor
- Years active: 2003–present
- Spouse: Shruti Mishra

Manish Prakash Chaudhari is an Indian actor who is best known for his character of Sunil Puri in Rocket Singh: Salesman of the Year. He made his film debut in the 2003 Indian film Rules: Pyaar Ka Superhit Formula. He was also seen in the 2021 web-series Aarya and Bombay Velvet (2015).

== Career ==
Chaudhari discovered his passion for acting as a 15-year-old school boy attending St. Paul's School, Darjeeling. After school, while he was completing his B. A. Hons. (English) at Kirori Mal College, Delhi University, he joined the College Theatre Society. In 1995, Chaudhari left Delhi and went to Mumbai, looking for a career in Hindi cinema. Chaudhari was also seen in the web series Aarya as Shekhawat on Disney Plus Hotstar Bombay Begums, directed by Alankrita Shrivastava. Starring Pooja Bhatt, Amruta Subhash, and Plabita Borthakur.

== Filmography ==
=== Films ===
Key
| † | Denotes films that have not yet been released |

| Year | Movie | Role | Notes |
|---|---|---|---|
| 2003 | Rules: Pyaar Ka Superhit Formula | Jogi | |
| 2005 | Socha Na Tha | Viren's Elder Brother | |
| 2005 | 7 1/2 Phere: More Than a Wedding | Nimit Joshi | |
| 2009 | Bachelor Party | Anand | |
| 2009 | Rocket Singh: Salesman of the Year | Sunil Puri | |
| 2010 | Lafangey Parindey | Inspector K.K. Sethna | |
| 2010 | Band Baaja Baaraat | Sidhwani | |
| 2011 | Stand By | John Williams | |
| 2011 | Lanka | Tyagi | |
| 2012 | Blood Money | Dharmesh Zaveri / Rajan Zakaria | |
| 2012 | Jannat 2 | Mangal Singh Tomar | |
| 2012 | Raaz 3 | Tara Dutt / evil spirit ghost | |
| 2013 | Maazii | Gulab Singh | |
| 2013 | Ankur Arora Murder Case | Defense Lawyer Rajeev Malini | |
| 2013 | Mickey Virus | ACP Siddhanth Chauhan | |
| 2015 | Bombay Velvet | Jimmy Mistry | |
| 2015 | Uvaa | Lawyer Pramod Mittal | |
| 2016 | Zubaan | Gurucharan Sikand (Lion of Gurudaspur) | |
| 2016 | Sanam Teri Kasam | Saru's father | |
| 2016 | Mohenjo Daro | The Priest | |
| 2017 | Aby | GK Menon | Malayalam film |
| 2017 | Noor | Shekhar Das | |
| 2018 | Satyameva Jayate | Commissioner Manish Kumar Shukla | |
| 2018 | Baazaar | Rana Dasgupta | |
| 2019 | Bypass Road | Inspector Himanshu Roy | |
| 2019 | Batla House | Joint CP Jaivir Singh | |
| 2022 | The Ghost | Lala | Telugu film |
| 2023 | Gandeevadhari Arjuna | Rana | Telugu film |
| 2024 | Bade Miyan Chote Miyan | General Karan Shergill | |
| 2025 | Aap Jaisa Koi | Bhanu Tripathi | |
| 2025 | Murderbaad | Suryakant Maheshwari | |
| 2025 | Kingdom | Vishwa Singh | Telugu film |
| 2026 | Kartavya | SP Keshav | Netflix film |
| 2026 | Chand Mera Dil | Aarav's Father | |

=== Television ===
| Year | Serial | Role | Notes |
|---|---|---|---|
| 1987 | Kauwwa Chale Hans ki Chaal | boy with guitar | Television film |
| 2010 | Powder | Usmaan Ali Malik | |
| 2014 | Everest | Brigadier Jagat Singh Rawat | |
| 2015 | Code Red Umeed | Dr. Prashant Bhaskar | |
| 2016–2017 | P.O.W. - Bandi Yuddh Ke | Major Vikram Singh | |
| 2018 | Yeh Pyaar Nahi Toh Kya Hai | Krishna Kanth "K.K." Reddy | |
| 2020 | Aarya | Shekhawat | Hotstar series |
| 2021 | Akkad Bakkad Rafu Chakkar | Gopal Tandon | Prime Video series |
| 2021 | Bombay Begums | Deepak Sanghvi | Netflix series |
| 2022 | Shoorveer | Group Captain Ranjan Mallik | Disney+ Hotstar series |
| 2023 | Jaanbaaz Hindustan Ke | NIA Chief Mahira's Husband | ZEE5 series |
| 2023 | Kohrra | Satwinder 'Steve' Dhillon | Netflix series |
| 2025 | The Ba***ds of Bollywood | Freddy Sodawallah | Netflix series |
