= Bombay Begums =

Indian drama series

- Genre: Drama
- Written by: Alankrita Shrivastava; Bornila Chatterjee; Iti Agarwal
- Directed by: Alankrita Shrivastava; Bornila Chatterjee
- Starring: Pooja Bhatt; Shahana Goswami; Amruta Subhash; Plabita Borthakur; Aadhya Anand
- Narrated by: Aadhya Anand
- Theme music composer: Sunny Dutta
- Composer: Anand Bhasker
- No. of seasons: 1
- No. of episodes: 6

Production
- Executive producer: Alankrita Shrivastava
- Cinematography: Akshay Singh
- Editors: Charu Shree Roy; Omkar Uttam Sakpal
- Production companies: Endemol Shine India; Chernin Entertainment

Original release
- Network: Netflix
- Release: 8 March 2021

Bombay Begums is an Indian drama television series for Netflix created by Alankrita Shrivastava, who also co-wrote the script along with Bornila Chatterjee and Iti Agarwal. The series was directed by Shrivastava and Chatterjee, and produced by the Los Angeles–based Chernin Entertainment and Endemol Shine Group. The cast features Pooja Bhatt, Shahana Goswami, Amruta Subhash and Plabita Borthakur in the lead roles, and was narrated by Aadhya Anand. The series marks the comeback of actress Pooja Bhatt. It explores the lives of five ambitious women from various walks of life navigating through their dreams, desires and disappointments, from boardrooms to society's margins, in modern-day Mumbai. It was released on Netflix on 8 March 2021.

== Plot ==
Set in contemporary urban India, five women, across generations, wrestle with desire, ethics, personal crises and vulnerabilities to own their ambition. Rani is the CEO of a bank who takes great effort in hiding the bank's problems. Fatima, who works under Rani, does everything possible to please her husband. Lily, who lives in a chawl, has previously been a bar dancer and is now scamming her way to a better life for herself and her son. Ayesha is bisexual and is from a small town (Indore) and is new to the city of Mumbai. The series explores drug abuse, blackmail, broken dreams, and aspirations of these characters.

== Cast ==
- Pooja Bhatt as Rani Singh Irani, CEO of Royal Bank of Bombay
- Shahana Goswami as Fatima Warsi
- Amruta Subhash as Lakshmi "Lily" Gondhali
- Plabita Borthakur as Ayesha Agarwal
- Aadhya Anand as Shai Irani
- Manish Choudhary as Deepak Sanghvi
- Rituraj Singh as Sanjay Puri
- Sanghmitra Hitaishi as Chithra Parasarthy
- Rahul Bose as Mahesh Rao
- Imaad Shah as Ron Fernandes
- Vivek Gomber as Arijai, Fatima's husband
- Danish Husain as Naushad Irani, Rani's husband
- Nauheed Cyrusi as Piya
- Vivek Tandon as Cyrus Dastur
- Deepak Soni as Raj Parkar
- Ekavali Khanna as Devyani Oniyal, Rani's former colleague at Royal Bank of Bombay who now works at FCB Asia Bank

== Episodes ==
No.	Title	Directed by	Written by	Original release date
1	"Women Who Run With The Wolves"	Alankrita Shrivastava	Alankrita Shrivastava	8 March 2021
Newly appointed bank CEO Rani tries to thwart a potential scandal. A promotion offer has Fatima torn. Ayesha attempts to forge ahead after a mistake.
2	"Love"	Alankrita Shrivastava	Iti Agarwal, Alankrita Shrivastava	8 March 2021
Helping Lily towards her goals, Ayesha mulls over her own unspoken desires. Rani and Fatima clash over business while navigating their deeper demons.
3	"The Colour Purple"	Bornila Chatterjee	Bornila Chatterjee, Alankrita Shrivastava	8 March 2021
New layers of Rani’s complicated marriage are revealed. Fatima juggles tough personal and professional decisions. Ayesha’s home hunting takes a detour.
4	"The Bell Jar"	Bornila Chatterjee	Bornila Chatterjee, Alankrita Shrivastava	8 March 2021
After an unwanted advance, Ayesha is conflicted about next steps. A leaked video puts Rani in a crisis. An enemy blocks Lily from starting her factory.
5	"The Golden Notebook"	Bornila Chatterjee	Iti Agarwal, Alankrita Shrivastava	8 March 2021
Ayesha speaks her truth, but is met with troubling reactions. A stifled Fatima continues to seek solace. Another setback disrupts Lily’s brief respite.
6	"A Room Of One's Own"	Alankrita Shrivastava	Alankrita Shrivastava	8 March 2021
Betrayals, confessions and shattered illusions propel Rani, Ayesha, Fatima, Lily and Shai to take the reins on their lives and make some big decisions.

== Production ==
=== Origin ===
Alankrita Shrivastava recalled in an interview that she had watched the 1991 film Dil Hai Ke Manta Nahin directed by Mahesh Bhatt, which saw his daughter Pooja Bhatt's acting into fruition, at least 21 times. She insisted to make a new project with Bhatt in the leading role. Titled Bombay Begums, Bhatt initially disagreed to accept the script although she liked the synopsis narrated by Shrivastava, but later changed her decision and gave her nod to the script. The series marked Pooja Bhatt's comeback in acting career after she made a cameo appearance in Sadak 2 (2020).

=== Development ===
The inspiration for Bombay Begums originated in 2012, when Shrivastava found herself wondering about the double lives of urban Indian women who join the corporate workforce and excel at their jobs but still have to confront gendered expectations back at home, citing the examples of her past life. She initially conceived of Bombay Begums as a television show and started writing the script, but she could not find the right producers for the series. After the release of Lipstick Under My Burkha in 2017, the Los Angeles-based Chernin Entertainment expressed interest in Bombay Begums and Netflix came on board soon after. Like her previous outings Lipstick Under My Burkha and Dolly Kitty Aur Woh Chamakte Sitare, Bombay Begums revolves around women who are in a state of transition – personal and professional – examining the illusion of freedom afforded to them in modern India.

=== Filming ===
Shrivastava started the creation of the series while working on the Prime original Made in Heaven. She and her co-team members Iti Agarwal and Bornila Chatterjee worked on the writing and direction of Bombay Begums. The principal shooting of the series took place in late 2019 and was completed in March 2020, weeks prior to the COVID-19 pandemic lockdown in India. The team undertook post-production activities in July 2020 and it was completed within two months.

== Soundtrack ==
Bombay Begums

Soundtrack album by Anand Bhasker, Chetan Dominic Awasthi and Tarana Marwah
- Released: 14 March 2021
- Genre: Soundtrack
- Length: 48:11
- Language: Hindi
- Label: Netflix
- Producers: Anand Bhasker; Tarana Marwah; Gaurav Raina; Chetan Dominic Awasthi

The soundtrack album of Bombay Begums featured seven songs composed by Tarana Marwah, one song by Chetan Dominic Awasthi and four songs by Anand Bhaskar. Gaurav Raina of the electronic group MIDIval Punditz mixed and mastered the soundtrack and also performed the theme music of the series. Raina also composed and written the song along with Tarana Marwah, who worked in the Amazon Prime Video series Made In Heaven. The album was released through YouTube on 14 March 2021.

Track listing
No.	Title	Lyrics	Music	Singer(s)	Length
1.	"Begum's Theme"	Tarana Marwah	Tarana Marwah	Tarana Marwah, Gaurav Raina	1:17
2.	"This Love"	Tarana Marwah	Tarana Marwah	Tarana Marwah	3:08
3.	"Watching"	Tarana Marwah	Tarana Marwah	Tarana Marwah	7:19
4.	"You Do You"	Tarana Marwah	Tarana Marwah	Tarana Marwah	4:16
5.	"Haunted"	Tarana Marwah	Tarana Marwah	Tarana Marwah	3:01
6.	"House Of Cards"	Tarana Marwah	Tarana Marwah	Tarana Marwah	4:28
7.	"Still I Feel"	Tarana Marwah	Tarana Marwah	Tarana Marwah	6:48
8.	"Favourite Sin"	Chetan Dominic Awasthi	Chetan Dominic Awasthi	Chezin	4:19
9.	"Harjaayi"	Ginny Diwan	Anand Bhaskar	Madhubanti Bagchi	3:24
10.	"Ishq Khumaari"	Ginny Diwan	Anand Bhaskar	Isheeta Chakrvarty	4:21
11.	"Jawaani"	Shraddha Sehgal	Anand Bhaskar	Shilpa Surroch	4:12
12.	"Khel"	Anand Bhaskar	Anand Bhaskar	Keka Ghoshal	4:08

== Release ==
Even before the announcement of the Netflix original slate on 3 March 2021, the team released the first poster of the series on 10 February 2021. On 18 February 2021, the official trailer of the series was unveiled through YouTube. The series was unveiled on 8 March 2021 through Netflix, which coincided the occasion of International Women's Day.

== Reception ==
=== Critical response ===
The series opened to mixed to positive responses from critics. Sayan Ghosh of The Hindu stated "Director Alankrita Shrivastava’s ability to navigate through various layers of suppressed anger and the emotional volatility of her characters make for a most engaging watch". Shubhra Gupta of The Indian Express stated "The most powerful element in Alankrita Srivastava's films is the recognition of women's desire, and how its absence can create permanent hollowness." Saibal Chatterjee of NDTV gave three-and-a-half out of five to the series and reviewed "Bombay Begums, created by Alankrita Shrivastava (Lipstick Under My Burkha), who shares screenwriting and directorial responsibilities with Bornila Chatterjee (The Hungry), strikes an instant chord because it strings together relatable, rooted stories."

Saraswati Datar of The News Minute gave a review "Bombay Begums is an entertaining watch, but don't expect to feel moved or empowered after watching it." Rohan Naahar of Hindustan Times stated "Terrific performances by Pooja Bhatt, Amruta Subhash, Plabita Borthakur, Shahana Goswami and Manish Chaudhary smooth out the creases." Swetha Ramakrishnan of Firstpost gave three-and-a-half out of five, reviewing, "With crisp episodes (even though clocking in at 50 minutes each), the series is fairly easy to sit through despite its imperfections."

=== Government censorship ===
India's National Commission for Protection of Child Rights sent notice to Netflix to stop streaming the series in March 2021. The notice quoted complaints from two Twitter users over content portraying the drug use of minors and themes of sexuality, saying it would "not only pollute the young minds of the children, and may also result in the abuse and the exploitation of children". The commission called on Netflix to "take extra precaution while streaming any content in respect of the children or for the children and shall also refrain themselves from getting into such things".

== Awards and nominations ==
Year	Award	Category	Recipient	Result	Ref.
2021	Asian Academy Creative Awards	Best Actress in a Supporting Role	Amruta Subhash	Won	

== See also ==
- Cuties, 2020 film with a similar controversy
