= List of awards and nominations received by Bhumi Pednekar =

Bhumi Pednekar awards and nominations
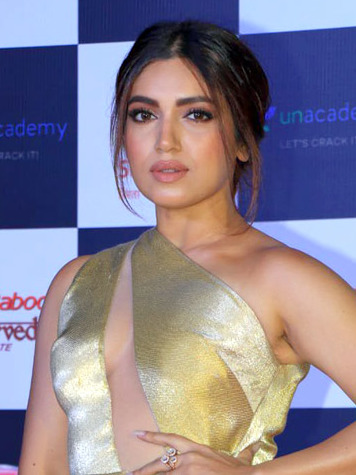
- Pednekar during Screen Awards in 2019
Awards and nominations
Award	Wins	Nominations
Filmfare Awards	3	8
Filmfare OTT Awards	0	1
International Indian Film Academy Awards	1	2
BIG Star Entertainment Awards	1	1
Nickelodeon Kids' Choice Awards	1	1
Screen Awards	2	3
Stardust Awards	1	1
Zee Cine Awards	2	5
Indian Film Festival of Melbourne	2	4
Producers Guild Film Awards	1	1
Times of India Film Awards	1	1
Asiavision Awards	1	1
ETC Bollywood Business Awards	1	1
Others	9	—

Totals (Note: Certain award groups do not simply award one winner. They acknowledge several different recipients, have runners-up, and have third place. Since this is a specific recognition and is different from losing an award, runner-up mentions are considered wins in this award tally. For simplification and to avoid errors, each award in this list has been presumed to have had a prior nomination.)
- Wins: 26
- Nominations: 38

Bhumi Pednekar is an Indian actress who works in Hindi films. Pedneker has received 26 accolades to her credit including three Filmfare, and two each from the Screen Awards and Zee Cine Awards, and one each from the Producers Guild Film Awards and International Indian Film Academy Awards.

== Filmfare Awards ==
Year	Category	Film	Result	Ref.
2016	Best Female Debut	Dum Laga Ke Haisha	Won	
2017	Best Actress	Shubh Mangal Saavdhan	Nominated	
2020	Best Actress (Critics)	Saand Ki Aankh	Won	
2020	Best Actress (Critics)	Sonchiriya	Nominated	
2021	Best Actress (Critics)	Dolly Kitty Aur Woh Chamakte Sitare	Nominated	
2023	Best Actress (Critics)	Badhaai Do	Won	
2023	Best Actress	Badhaai Do	Nominated	
2024	Best Actress	Thank You for Coming	Nominated	

== Filmfare OTT Awards ==
Year	Category	Film	Result	Ref.
2024	Best Actor in a Web Original Film – Female	Bhakshak	Nominated	

== IIFA Awards ==
Year	Category	Film	Result	Ref.
2016	Star Debut of the Year – Female	Dum Laga Ke Haisha	Won	
2017	Best Actress	Shubh Mangal Saavdhan	Nominated	

== Screen Awards ==
Year	Category	Film	Result	Ref.
2016	Best Female Debut	Dum Laga Ke Haisha	Won	
2017	Best Actress	Shubh Mangal Saavdhan	Nominated	
2020	Best Actress (Critics)	Saand Ki Aankh	Won	

== Zee Cine Awards ==
Year	Category	Film	Result	Ref.
2016	Best Female Debut	Dum Laga Ke Haisha	Won	
2017	Best Actor – Female (Viewer's Choice)	Toilet: Ek Prem Katha	Nominated	
2017	Best Actor – Female (Jury's Choice)	Toilet: Ek Prem Katha	Nominated	
2020	Best Supporting Actress	Bala	Won	
2020	Best Actor – Female (Jury's Choice)	Saand Ki Aankh	Nominated	

== Indian Film Festival of Melbourne ==
Year	Category	Film	Result	Ref.
2015	Best Actress	Dum Laga Ke Haisha	Won	
2017	Best Actress	Badhaai Do	Nominated	
2023	Disruptor of the Year	—N/a	Won	
2023	Best Actress	Bheed	Nominated	

== Jagran Film Festival ==
Year	Category	Film	Result	Ref.
2015	Best Actress	Dum Laga Ke Haisha	Won	

== Producers Guild Film Awards ==
Year	Category	Film	Result	Ref.
2016	Best Female Debut	Dum Laga Ke Haisha	Won	

== Stardust Awards ==
Year	Category	Film	Result	Ref.
2016	Superstar of Tomorrow – Female	Dum Laga Ke Haisha	Won	

== BIG Star Entertainment Awards ==
Year	Category	Film	Result	Ref.
2016	Most Entertaining Actor in a Social Role – Female	Dum Laga Ke Haisha	Won	

== Times of India Film Awards ==
Year	Category	Film	Result	Ref.
2016	Best Debut Female	Dum Laga Ke Haisha	Won	

== ETC Bollywood Business Awards ==
Year	Category	Film	Result	Ref.
2016	Highest Grossing Debut Female	Dum Laga Ke Haisha	Won	

== Asiavision Awards ==
Year	Category	Film	Result	Ref.
2017	Best Actress	Toilet: Ek Prem Katha	Won	

== News 18 Reel Awards ==
Year	Category	Film	Result	Ref.
2017	Best Actress	Shubh Mangal Saavdhan	Nominated	

== Nickelodeon Kids' Choice Awards ==
Year	Category	Film	Result	Ref.
2019	Jodi Kamaal Ki	Saand Ki Aankh (Tied with Taapsee Pannu)	Won	

== Other awards and recognition ==
Year	Award / Organisation	Category	Result	Ref.
2017	Filmfare Glamour And Style Awards	Emerging Face of Fashion	Won	
2018	Lokmat Stylish Awards	Stylish Rising Star Female	Won	
2020	Lion Gold Awards	Versatile Lead Actress	Won	
2022	GQ Men of The Year Awards	Creative Force	Won	
2023	Pinkvilla Style Icons Awards	Presents Stylish Pathbreaker – Female	Won	
2023	Bollywood Hungama Style Icons	Most Stylish Social Warrior	Won	
2023	Grazia Millennial Awards	Star on the Rise	Won	
2023	Elle Beauty Awards	Gamechanger of the Year	Won	
2023	Elle Beauty Awards	Champion of the Year	Won	
