= Ek Se Badhkar Ek: Chota Packet Bada Dhamaka =

- The "Chota Packet Bada Dhamaka" logo.
- Created by: UTV Software Communications
- Opening theme: "Chota Packet Bada Dhamaka"
- Country of origin: India
- No. of episodes: Total 30 + Grand Finale

Production
- Running time: 52 minutes

Original release
- Network: Zee TV
- Release: 20 September 2008 – 3 January 2009

Related
- Ek Se Badkhkar Ek - Jalwe Sitaron Ke

Ek Se Badhkar Ek - Chota Packet Bada Dhamaka sibi is a Hindi television reality show that aired on Zee TV channel, starting from 20 September 2008 until 3 January 2009. The show is an extension of Ek Se Badhkar Ek - Jalwe Sitaron Ke, and will be based on popular Hindi television 'Kids'. The show is a unique because it has both singing and dancing in a one platform.

== Concept ==
The show features popular Kids from Indian television industry who are best dancers & best singers. As its first season, this season also features 8 pairs – a singer and a dancer who are divided into teams to participate and earn points with their individual / respective skills. The finale took place on 3 January 2009. The winning jodi (team) was the team of Vasundhara and Ayush, votes being counted as 50% by the audience and 50% by the judges. The scholarship of 25 Lakh Rupees was the grand prize for the winning team. Amir/Ehsaas achieved 2nd place and Rohanpreet/Chinky achieved 3rd place. The best singer from the eliminated teams was awarded to Smita whereas the best dancer was awarded to Adrita; this decision was evaluated by the judges.

=== Host ===
- Swapnil Joshi (Indian comedian)

=== Judges ===
- Kunal Kohli (Bollywood director/producer)
- Annu Kapoor (Indian television presenter)
- Rakhi Sawant (Bollywood dancer)
- vinay ramani {Bollywood hiro }

=== Contestants ===
- Ayush Tandon / Vasundhara Raturi - Winners
- Anamika Choudhari / Adrita Das
- Rohanpreet Singh / Chinky - 2nd Runner Up
- Tanmay Chaturvedi / Khushi Dubey
- Smita Nandi / Dhairya
- Vaishali Raikwar / Dwij
- Aamir Hafeez / Apurva - 1st Runner Up
- Vibhor Parashar / Ahsaas Channa

=== Wildcard Entries ===
- Armaan / Ananya
- Amir Hafeez / Ahsaas Channa - 1st Runner Up

=== Eliminated ===
- Vaishali Raikwar / Dwij
- Aamir Hafeez / Apoorva
- Vibhor Parashar / Ehsaas Channa
- Smita Nandi / Dhairya
- Armaan / Ananya
- Tanmay Chaturvedi / Khushi Dubey
- Anamika Choudhari / Adrita Das
- VINAY RAMANI / KRUPA SENGHANI
