= Pyaar Testing =

Indian romantic comedy series

- Genre: Romantic comedy
- Directed by: Shiva Varma; Saptaraj Chakraborty
- Starring: Satyajeet Dubey; Plabita Borthakur; Neelu Dogra; Gaurav Sikri
- Country of origin: India
- Original language: Hindi
- No. of seasons: 1

Production
- Cinematography: Shanu Singh Rajput
- Editor: Vinay Malu
- Camera setup: Multi-camera

Original release
- Network: ZEE5
- Release: 14 February 2025

Pyaar Testing is a 2025 Indian Hindi-language romantic comedy series directed by Shiva Varma and Saptaraj Chakraborty. It stars Satyajeet Dubey and Plabita Borthakur, known for her role in Lipstick Under My Burkha, in the lead roles. Set in Rajasthan, the series follows the relationship of a young couple. The supporting cast includes Neelu Dogra and Gaurav Sikri. It is scheduled for release on 14 February 2025, on ZEE5.

== Plot summary ==
Set in Rajasthan, Pyaar Testing follows Dhruv Pratap Rathore (Satyajeet Dubey), an architect and water conservationist, and Amrita Singh Chauhan (Plabita Borthakur), an animal rights activist and vegan café owner. Their arranged marriage takes an unconventional turn when Amrita suggests a two-month platonic live-in relationship to assess their compatibility before committing to marriage. The decision creates tensions within their traditional Rajput families, leading them to confront societal expectations.

The plot is very similar to the 2017 Marathi movie 'Chi va Chi Sau Ka', though no credit seems to be given.

== Cast ==
- Satyajeet Dubey as Dhruv
- Plabita Borthakur as Amrita
- Neelu Dogra as Sunaina chauhan
- Gaurav Sikri as Narendra Rathore

== Release ==
The series is scheduled to premiere on 14 February 2025, on ZEE5. The official trailer was released on 3 February 2025.

== Episodes ==
No.	Title	Directed by	Original release date
1	"Rishta Confirmed Ya Rejected?"	Shiva Varma, Saptaraj Chakraborty	14 February 2025
Dhruv and Amrita cross paths while assisting their best friends in running away together. Fate brings them back into each other's lives when their families set them up for an arranged marriage. While Dhruv is open to the idea, Amrita presents an unexpected condition.
2	"Shaadi Pending, Live-In Trending"	Shiva Varma, Saptaraj Chakraborty	14 February 2025
Amrita nearly breaks off the engagement when she discovers Dhruv's unwavering love for non-vegetarian food. To keep the peace, Dhruv agrees to give up meat during their live-in period, seemingly resolving the conflict. But beneath the surface, tensions linger—will this compromise truly be enough?
3	"Bach Gaye, Par Phas Gaye"	Shiva Varma, Saptaraj Chakraborty	14 February 2025
Amrita and Dhruv successfully clear their names and reassure their parents of their innocence. Upon returning home, they stumble upon a startling secret about Dadi, leaving them both surprised. Amid the chaos, they finally share a moment of genuine connection.
4	"Pyaar Ka Double Shot"	Shiva Varma, Saptaraj Chakraborty	14 February 2025
Dhruv’s day takes a difficult turn, but Amrita steps in to support him. Later, he bonds with Amrita’s family, and the evening seems to unfold smoothly. However, just as things fall into place, Dadi’s long-hidden secret is unexpectedly revealed, shaking everyone.
5	"Dil Ya Deal?"	Shiva Varma, Saptaraj Chakraborty	14 February 2025
On a challenging day, Dhruv makes a reckless choice and unintentionally breaks a crucial rule from their agreement. As guilt weighs on him, he struggles with the decision—should he come clean to Amrita, or risk keeping it a secret forever?
6	"Kya Pyaar Abhi Baaki Hai?"	Shiva Varma, Saptaraj Chakraborty	14 February 2025
A heated argument between Amrita and Dhruv brings their contract to an abrupt end. As they attempt to move on, Amrita accepts a new marriage proposal, seemingly closing the chapter on their story. But is this truly the end, or does fate have other plans?
7	"T&C Removed, Pyaar Approved"	Shiva Varma, Saptaraj Chakraborty	14 February 2025
Amrita and Dhruv come to understand that true love thrives without restrictions or conditions. Their families, too, acknowledge that the trial period wasn’t such a bad idea after all. With newfound clarity, will this realization bring them closer than ever?

== Critical reception ==
Sonal Verma of Times Now rated the series 3.0 out of 5 starts, noting that while Plabita Borthakur and Satyajeet Dubey effectively portray the complexities of relationships, the series delivers an engaging blend of drama, comedy, and heartfelt moments that keep viewers entertained.

Siddartha Toleti of M9 News described the show as offering "Familiar Comfort, but lacking Novelty".

Shaheen Irani of OTTPlay gave it 2 out of 5 stars and stated "There's very little that Pyaar Testing has to offer. If you can settle for mediocre acting and a story that had potential but is not tapped into fully, then you can watch this one. Otherwise it is worth a skip rather than stream."
