= Ayush =

Ayush may refer to:

- Ministry of Ayush, a department of state in India
- Ayush Badoni (born 1999), Indian cricketer
- Ayush Tandon (born 1998), Indian actor
