= Turning 30 =

Turning 30!!!
- Theatrical release poster
- Directed by: Alankrita Shrivastava
- Story by: Alankrita Shrivastava
- Produced by: Prakash Jha
- Starring: Gul Panag; Tillotama Shome; Anita Kanwar; Purab Kohli; Siddharth Makkar
- Cinematography: Akshay Singh
- Edited by: Santosh Mandal
- Music by: Siddharth-Suhas
- Production company: Prakash Jha Productions
- Release date: 14 January 2011
- Running time: 121 minutes
- Country: India
- Languages: English; Hindi

Turning 30!!! is a 2011 Indian romance film produced by Prakash Jha and is also the directorial debut of Alankrita Shrivastava, a longtime assistant of Jha.

The movie features Gul Panag, Siddharth Makkar and Purab Kohli, with music composed by the music director duo of Sidharth-Suhas, whose past works include Dil Dosti and Bhram.The film is a young urban love story and women centric film.

== Plot ==
Naina, who is about to celebrate turning 30, has a seemingly picture-perfect life with a good job and a steady boyfriend. However, things turn into a nightmare when her boyfriend breaks up with her to marry a girl who can finance his father's failing business. Naina has some setbacks at work when the credit for all her ideas and hard work goes to undeserving people. With only a few days left until her birthday, she is in a mess and constantly trying to win her boyfriend back. The film also tells the stories of Malini and Ruksana, Naina's two best friends, who stand by her and support her through the respective rough patches in their lives.

== Cast ==
- Gul Panag as Naina
- Purab Kohli as Jay
- Siddharth Makkar as Rishab
- Tillotama Shome as Malini
- Jeneva Talwar as Ruksana
- Anita Kanwar as Naina's Mother
- Rahul Singh
- Sameer Malhotra
- Bikramjeet Kanwarpal
- Satyadeep Mishra
- Karaan Singh
- Ira Dubey in a Special Appearance
- Anuj Tikku as Annirudh

== Review ==
NDTV movie review gave 2 out of 5 stars stating "..what sinks this ship is the lame writing". Rediff movies review gave 1.5 out 5 stating "..A film can't be both empowering and embarrassing -- and here the latter is painfully predominant"

== Soundtrack ==
The music is composed by Siddharth-Suhas. Lyrics are penned by Suhas, Kumaar, Ram Goutam, and Prashant Pandey.

=== Track listing ===
No.	Title	Lyrics	Performer(s)	Length
1.	"My Kajra"	Kumaar	Saptak, Shashaa Tirupati	4:21
2.	"Sapney"	Kumaar	Suhas	4:38
3.	"Tinka Tinka"	Raam Goutam	Hamza Faruqui	4:46
4.	"Turning 30!!!"	Suhas	Aditi Singh Sharma	4:31
5.	"Will You Marry Me....."	Prashant Pandey	Suraj Jagan, Aparna Dauria	4:13
6.	"My Kajra - Remix"	Kumaar	Saptak, Shashaa Tirupati	4:03
7.	"Turning 30!!! - Remix"	Suhas	Aditi Singh Sharma	3:44
