= Sid Makkar =

Indian actor

- Born: Siddharth Makkar; Mumbai, Maharashtra, India
- Occupation: Actor
- Years active: 2006–present

Siddharth Makkar, popularly known as Sid Makkar, is an Indian actor who works in Hindi and English language films and television.

== Career ==
Sid began acting after studying at the University of Texas. He has worked in Indian, American, British and Australian films. His works include the very successful John Madden-directed The Best Exotic Marigold Hotel with Judi Dench and Dev Patel, the cult favourite Sense8 Season 2 (Netflix) by the Wachowski's and the Australian film 'Save your Legs'.

Sid has played leading parts in Indian series like 'Spotlight', 'Six', and films like Hacked, Turning 30 and Zoya Akhtar's first film Luck by Chance. He played the protagonist, a detective in the 1850s, Mughal-era series 'Dariba Diaries' and received much acclaim.

With his love for theatre, he has gravitated towards playing the titular role in the hit Bollywood musical Zangoora. He essayed the role of Gautama Buddha in Lushin Dubey's Buddha and worked on other dramatic plays like 'Where did I Leave my Purdah' directed by Lillete Dubey and "Art" directed by Mahabanoo Mody Kotwal and Kaizaad Kotwal.

== Filmography ==
=== Films ===
Year	Title	Role	Language	Notes
2006	Offshore	Ajay Tiwari	English	
2009	Luck by Chance	Sameer	Hindi	
2009	Straight	Rajat	Hindi	
2010	Dus Tola	Ravi	Hindi	
2011	Turning 30	Rishabh Puri	Hindi	
2012	The Best Exotic Marigold Hotel	Jay	English	
2012	Talk to Me		English	Short film
2012	Save Your Legs!	Tusshar Rai	English	
2012	Chaurahen		English	
2015	The Second Best Exotic Marigold Hotel	Jay	English	
2017	The Big Fat City	Puneet	Hindi	
2020	Hacked	Om Kapoor	Hindi	
2019	377 AbNormal	Keshav	Hindi	ZEE5 film
2021	Corvid's Head	Harmesh	English, Hindi	
2025	Saiyaara	Vinit Rawal	Hindi	

=== Web series ===
Year	Title	Role	Platform	Notes
2017	Sense8	Ajay	Netflix	
2017	Rain	Abhay	YouTube	
2017	Spotlight	Romesh	VIU	
2019	Made in Heaven	Bilal	Amazon Video	
2019	Faceless		JioCinema	
2020	State of Siege: 26/11	Sontosh Dutta	ZEE5	
2021	Six	Kashish Sura	Disney + Hotstar	
2022	Barun Rai and the House on the Cliff			
2024	Raisinghani vs Raisinghani	Akshat Mehra	SonyLIV	

=== Television ===
Year	Title	Role	Notes
2006	Ghar Ki Lakshmi Betiyaan	Satyakam Kapadia	
2007-2008	Mere Apne	Shankar	
2008	Kahaani Hamaaray Mahaabhaarat Ki	Arjuna	
2014-2015	Dariba Diaries	Mirza Jaan Nawaz	
2015-2016	Lajwanti	Sunderlal Bharadwaj	
2016–2017	Ye Hai Mohabbatein	Vidyut	
2022	Dhadkan Zindaggi Kii	Nikhil Sardesai	

=== Theatre ===
Year	Title	Role(s)
2010	Zangoora	Zangoora
	Where did I Leave my Purdah	Vinay, Suhel and Dushyant
	Buddha	Prince Siddhartha / Gautama Buddha
	Lift Kara De	Goldy
	Art	Serge
