= Plabita Borthakur =

Indian actress

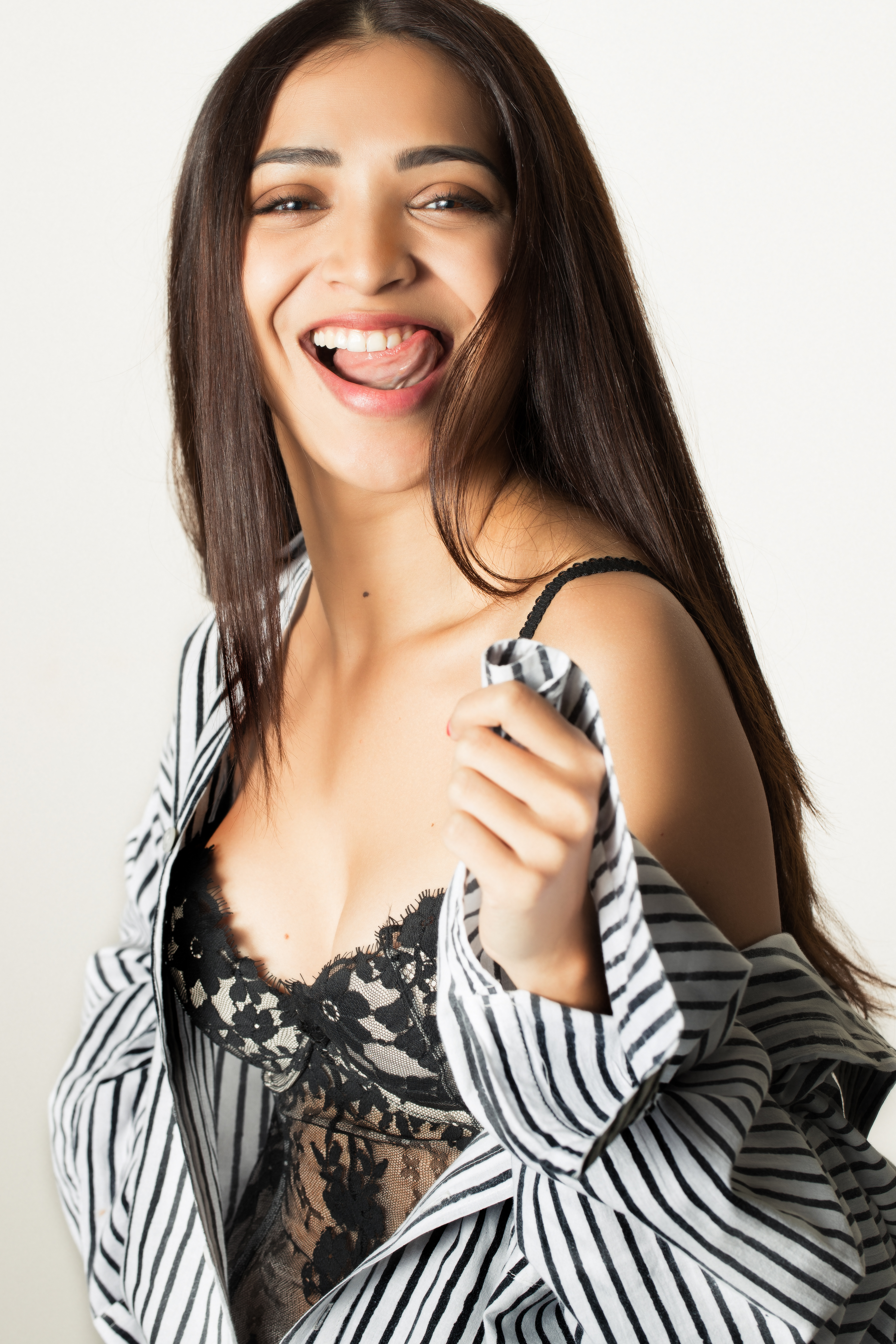
- Borthakur in 2018
- Born: 17 June 1992 (age 34); Duliajan, Dibrugarh, Assam, India
- Occupations: Actress; singer
- Years active: 2014–present
- Parents: Probin Borthakur; Rina Borthakur
- Relatives: Parineeta Borthakur (Sister) Priyangi Borthakur (Sister)
- Website: plabitaborthakur.com

Plabita Borthakur (born 17 June 1992) is an Indian actress, singer and artist from Assam, India. She made her acting debut in the Bollywood movie PK. She is best known for her portrayal of Rehana Abidi in the movie Lipstick Under My Burkha.

== Early life ==
Her father Probin Borthakur was an engineer by profession with Oil India Limited, as well as being an Indian classical singer and teacher. Her mother Rina is a writer and poet. Her older sisters, Parineeta Borthakur and Priyangi Borthakur, are in the film industry as well. She grew up in the Oil India township of Duliajan in Assam, before moving to Mumbai's Jai Hind College for higher studies. Professionally, she got her start with numerous ad assignments and concerts with her band, Manu and Chow.

== Career ==
Borthakur made her debut in PK in a blink-and-miss role as Anushka Sharma's sister. She returned with another Bollywood film, where she plays one of the main protagonists in the much spoken about, Lipstick Under My Burkha.

On 15 July 2017, she made a special appearance on The Kapil Sharma Show, alongside Prakash Jha and Ekta Kapoor.

Borthakur has received rave reviews for her performance as a Muslim girl, Rehana Abidi in Lipstick Under My Burkha.

Her webseries, What's Your Status released in July 2018. She was part of an episodic web series on Zee5 called Parchhayee, that released on 24 June 2019.

In June 2019, the trailer of Doosra shows her in a pivotal role.

In 2020, she was in the critically acclaimed web-series Breathe: Into the Shadows on Amazon Prime Video. Borthakur also starred in two feature films as Reena in Waah Zindagi and as Fauziya in Chhote Nawab.

In 2021, she starred as Ayesha in the web series Bombay Begums, directed by Alankrita Shrivastava, starring Pooja Bhatt, Amruta Subhash, Shahana Goswami and Aadhya Anand.

== Music ==
She is also an independent musician and part of a band called Manu and Chow. They have so far, released a couple of original songs and a Music video called "P".

== Filmography ==
=== Films ===
Year	Film	Role	Note
2014	PK	Jaggu's sister	
2017	Lipstick Under My Burkha	Rehana Abidi	
2021	Ahaan	Onella	Netflix film
2021	Waah Zindagi	Reena	
2022	Homecoming	Nargis	
2024	Chote Nawab	Fauziya	
2024	Protishruti	Simran	Assamese film
2026	Doosra	Tara	Oct 23

=== Web series ===
Year	Series	Role	Platform
2015	Big F	Anjali	MTV India
2018	What's Your Status	Aisha Sharma	YouTube
2019	Fuh Se Fantasy	Jyotsna (Jo)	Voot
2019	Parchhayee	Neelam	Zee5
2020	Breathe : Into the Shadows	Meghna Verma	Amazon Prime Video
2021	Bombay Begums	Ayesha Agarwal	Netflix
2022	Sutliyan	Ramni	ZEE5
2022	Escaype Live	Hina	Disney+ Hotstar
2024	Pyaar Testing	Amrita	

== Awards and nominations ==
Year	Film	Award	Category	Result	Ref.
2018	Lipstick Under My Burkha	Star Screen Awards	Most Promising Newcomer - Female	Nominated	
