= Sutliyan =

Indian web series

- Genre: Drama; Comedy
- Written by: Abhishek Chatterjee; Dhanesh Fulfagar; Sudeep Nigam
- Directed by: Shree Narayan Singh
- Starring: Ayesha Raza; Plabita Borthakur; Shiv Panditt; Vivaan Shah; Vivek Mushran
- Country of origin: India
- Original language: Hindi
- No. of seasons: 1
- No. of episodes: 8

Production
- Producers: Karan Raj Kohli; Viraj Kapur
- Cinematography: Anshuman Mahaley
- Editor: Abhijit Deshpande
- Production company: Manor Rama Pictures

Original release
- Release: 25 February 2022

Sutliyan is an Indian web-series on ZEE5 starring Plabita Borthakur, Ayesha Raza, Shiv Panditt and Vivaan Shah. Sutliyan is created by Karan Raj Kohli / Viraj Kapur and Directed by Shree Narayan Singh. The eight part series is written by Sudeep Nigam and Abhishek Chatterjee and is produced by Manor Rama Pictures. Sutliyan released on 4 March 2022 on ZEE5.

== Plot ==
Sutliyan is a warm and fuzzy family drama set in the city of lakes and gardens, Bhopal. The Chandel family gets together after a long interval for Diwali, but unlike other years, everything is different now. Rajan (Shiv Panditt), Ramni(Plabita Borthakur) and Raman(Vivaan Shah) lost their father at the beginning of the early lockdowns and none of them could make it to his funeral, much to the angst of their mother Supriya (Ayesha Raza). The family reunites and while there is joy and nostalgia, as often happens with families, there is a fair share of angst and drama. The threads that bind us all together – Sutliyan – keep the family tied, yet we see an unspooling and unravelling at the same time.

== Cast ==
- Ayesha Raza as Supriya
- Plabita Borthakur as Ramni
- Shiv Panditt as Ranjan
- Vivaan Shah as Raman
- Suneel Sinha
- Niharika Lyra Dutt
- Disha Arora
- Swastik Tiwari
- Vivek Mushran

== Reception ==
Archika Khurrana from Times of India gave three star and wrote" This heart-warming family reunion is well worth your time." Nandini Ramnath from Scroll.in wrote "Family ties bind and gag in well-performed drama".
