= Chote Nawab =

- Official poster
- Directed by: Kumud Chaudhary
- Written by: Arshad Jafri; Gaurav Sharma
- Produced by: Vikram Mehra; Siddharth Anand Kumar
- Starring: Akshay Oberoi; Plabita Borthakur; Svar Kamble
- Cinematography: Arun Varma
- Edited by: Afzal Sirajuddin Shaikh
- Music by: Mangesh Dhakde
- Production company: Yoodlee films
- Release date: 23 February 2024
- Country: India
- Language: Hindi

Chote Nawab (transl. Little Prince) is a 2024 Indian Hindi-language drama film directed by Kumud Chaudhary. Produced by Yoodlee films, it stars Akshay Oberoi, Plabita Borthakur and Svar Kamble. The film was theatrically released on 23 February 2024.

== Cast ==
- Akshay Oberoi as Armaan
- Plabita Borthakur as Fauziya
- Svar Kamble as Junaid
- Shataf Figar as Afsar
- Ekavali Khanna as Mariam
- Rajshri Deshpande as Asgari
- Falaq Naaz as Nafeesa
- Sadiya Siddiqui as Gullo
- Sohaila Kapur as Sakeena Bai
- Ayush Tandon as Imaan
- Lalit Tiwari
- Neeraj Sood

== Production ==
The film was announced in July 2018 with Akshay Oberoi and Plabita Borthakur joining the cast. The principal photography of the film took place in Lucknow. The trailer was released on 9 February 2024.

== Music ==
Chote Nawab

Soundtrack album
- Released: February 20, 2024
- Genre: Feature film soundtrack
- Length: 16:10
- Language: Hindi
- Label: Saregama

The film has following tracks:

Track listing
| No. | Title | Lyrics | Singer(s) | Length |
|---|---|---|---|---|
| 1. | "Laado" | Vayu | Jyotica Tangri, Dev Negi | 3:28 |
| 2. | "Paason Ka Khel" | Sanjeev Sharma | Rahul Ram, Himanshu Joshi | 4:22 |
| 3. | "Raat Bhi Neend Bhi" | Firaq Gorakhpuri | Nandini Srikar | 3:29 |
| 4. | "Kisi Ranjish Ko" | Sudarshan Faakir | Nandini Srikar | 4:50 |
| Total length: | | | | 16:10 |

== Reception ==
Vinamra Mathur for Firstpost gave 2 stars to the film. Dhaval Roy of The Times of India rated the film 3.5 stars out of 5. A critic from Deccan Chronicle also reviewed the film.

=== Accolades ===
| Date | Award | Category | Recipients | Result | Ref. |
|---|---|---|---|---|---|
| 2020 | Indian Film Festival of Cincinnati | Best Film | Yoodlee films | Won | |
