= Doosra (2026 film) =

Doosra: India’s Other Freedom Struggle
- Theatrical release poster
- Directed by: Abhinay Deo
- Screenplay by: Agnello Dias; Matt Graham; Zak Shaikh
- Story by: Rohan Sajdeh; Agnello Dias
- Produced by: Masha Sajdeh; Steven Cantor; Jamie Schutz
- Starring: Plabita Borthakur; Ankur Vikal; Samidha Guru; Twisha Joshi; Krishna Gokani
- Cinematography: Mohammed Rubais
- Edited by: Ayelet Gil Efrat
- Music by: Ram Sampath
- Production company: RDP Production
- Distributed by: PVR Inox Pictures
- Release date: 23 October 2026
- Country: India
- Languages: Hindi; English

Doosra: India’s Other Freedom Struggle is a 2026 Hindi-language film directed by Abhinay Deo. Doosra is a new story of India's freedom, showing how a billion people and a young girl defy centuries of prejudice to find their voice and identity through cricket. The film released on 23 October 2026.

== Plot ==
Set between 1991 and 2001, the film uses both documentary and narrative to weave together two storylines. One, of a young Indian cricket team under the harsh glare of the national spotlight. The other, a deeply private story of a defiant young girl caught in the crosshairs of a conservative, patriarchal society. The two stories come to a head when India defeats England in a nail-biting finish to win the 2002 NatWest Series Final. The maverick cricket captain, Sourav Ganguly, pulls off his shirt and waves it bare-chested from the haloed balcony at Lord’s Cricket Ground to celebrate India’s victory. A celebratory act turns into a declaration of freedom for a nation to shed its inferiority complex and rise from under the shadow of its Colonial masters. This signal of defiance gives Tara, a young girl watching the match at home, the steely courage to speak the truth, despite the consequences.

== Crew ==
The original idea came from the Executive Producer Rohan Sajdeh. Writer Agnello Oswin Dias developed the story using a young girl as an allegory for a changing India. It is produced by Masha Sajdeh, Steven Cantor and Jamie Schutz, with Rohan Sajdeh as executive producer and Neeta Shah and Jonathan Theodore Baker as co-producers. Its creative credits include original music composed by Ram Sampath, cinematography by Mohammed Rubais, production design by Mustafa Stationwala and sound design by Vivek Sachidanand. The screenplay was written by Agnello Dias and co-written by Matt Graham and Zak Shaikh, and dialogues by Pradhuman Singh Mall.

== Cast ==
- Plabita Borthakur as Tara
- Ankur Vikal as Tara's father
- Krishna Gokani as Manju
- Twisha Joshi as young Tara
- Samidha Guru as Tara's mother
- Navin Ratwa as Tara's brother
- Akshay Ajit Singh as Tara's husband
- J. P. Chopra as Tara's father-in-law
- Kavita Mathur as Tara's mother-in-law
