= Nivedita Jha =

Indian journalist and women's-rights activist

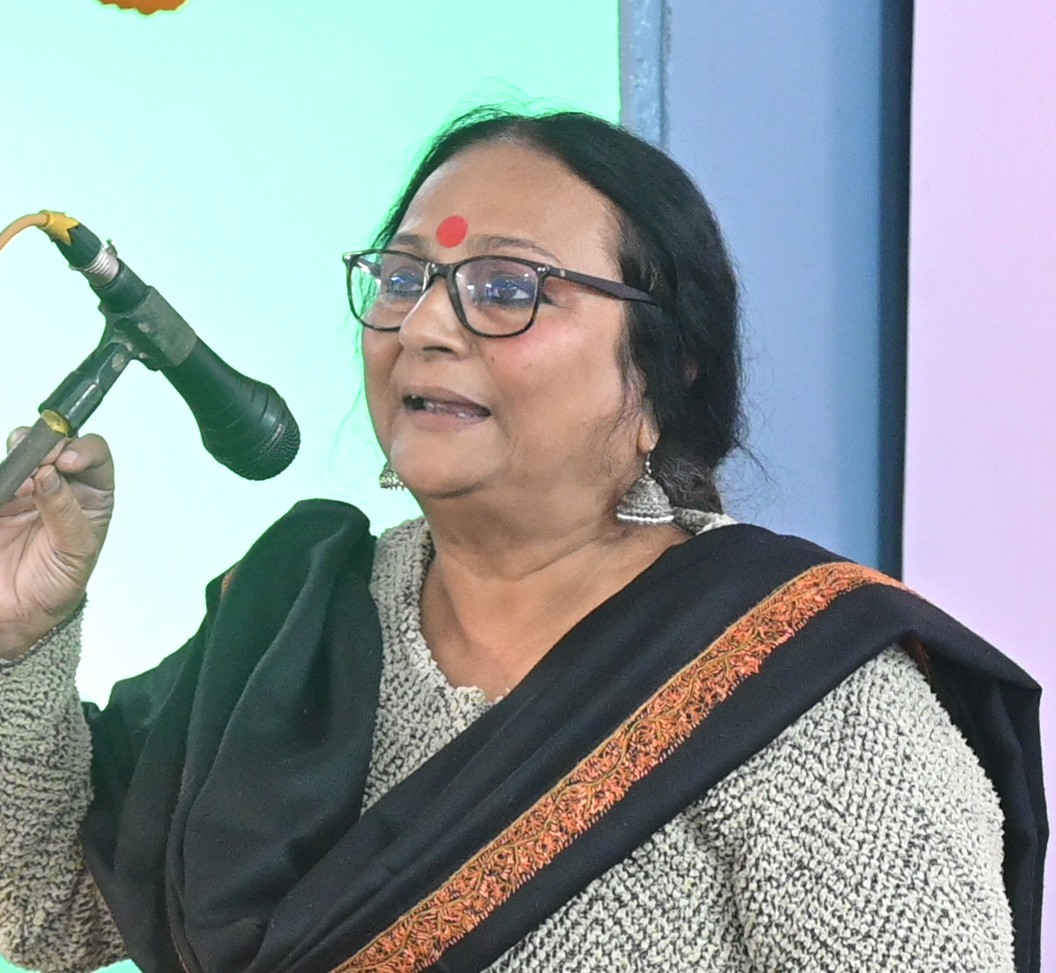
- Nivedita Jha
- Born: April 4, 1965 (age 60); Patna, Bihar, India
- Occupations: Journalist, social activist, poet
- Known for: Reporting on the Muzaffarpur shelter home case

Nivedita Jha (born 4 April 1965) is an Indian journalist, social activist and poet from Bihar. She is known for her work on issues related to women’s rights and social justice and currently serves as the president of the Bihar Mahila Samaj. She is also the president of the Bihar chapter of South Asian Women in Media (SAWM).

Nivedita Jha began her journalism career with Navbharat Times and later worked as an independent journalist. Over the years she has reported on social justice issues, women's rights and public policy matters in Bihar. She came into wider public attention for her reporting and activism related to the Muzaffarpur shelter home case, a major criminal case involving allegations of sexual abuse of minor girls in a government-funded shelter home in Bihar. The issue received national attention and led to demands for investigation and judicial intervention.

Jha also filed a petition in the Supreme Court seeking directions regarding the investigation and media reporting in the Muzaffarpur shelter home case. She received the Laadli Media Award for Gender Sensitivity (2010–11) for Best Hindi News Report.

Apart from journalism, Jha has also been associated with social activism in Bihar. As the president of Bihar Mahila Samaj, she has been involved in campaigns and protests related to women’s rights and gender justice.

Nivedita Jha is also known for her literary work. She has written several poetry collections including Zakhm Jitne The, Prem Mein Dar, Patna Diary, and Ab Ke Basant. Her poetry often reflects social realities, human emotions and experiences from everyday life.
