= Dolly Kitty Aur Woh Chamakte Sitare =

2019 Indian film by Alankrita Shrivastava

- Netflix release poster
- Directed by: Alankrita Shrivastava
- Produced by: Ekta Kapoor; Shobha Kapoor
- Starring: Konkona Sen Sharma; Bhumi Pednekar
- Cinematography: John Jacob Payyapalli
- Edited by: Charu Shree Roy
- Music by: Mangesh Dhakde
- Production companies: Balaji Motion Pictures; ALT Entertainment
- Distributed by: Netflix
- Release dates: 4 October 2019 (Busan); 18 September 2020 (Netflix)
- Running time: 126 minutes
- Country: India
- Language: Hindi

Dolly Kitty Aur Woh Chamakte Sitare (transl. Dolly, Kitty and those shining stars) is a 2019 Indian Hindi-language film starring Konkona Sen Sharma and Bhumi Pednekar. The film is directed by Alankrita Shrivastava and is produced by Ekta Kapoor and Shobha Kapoor under their banner Balaji Telefilms. The film also features actors Vikrant Massey and Amol Parashar opposite the leading actors.

The film premiered at the 24th Busan International Film Festival under the section "A Window on Asian Cinema" on 4 October 2019. The film was released on Netflix on 18 September 2020.

== Plot ==
Radha "Dolly" Yadav is part of a middle-class family in Noida with her husband Amit and two sons. While they are financially stable, they struggle to pay the installments for a new luxury apartment they are in the process of purchasing. Unbeknownst to Amit, Dolly manages the payments by selling her jewelry or by stealing money from her employers, a small accounting firm. Dolly's younger cousin Kajal has recently arrived from rural Bihar to chase her dreams and aspirations in the city. When Kajal tells Dolly that Amit makes unwanted advances towards her, Dolly puts it down to misunderstanding and laughs it off. Uncomfortable with her situation, Kajal looks to move out of Dolly's home but this is made difficult by her lack of qualifications.

Eventually, Kajal takes up a job at a call center for Red Rose Romance, a paid dating app where men can call in and speak to the women of their fantasies. After working through the initial shock of realization that most men call the app demanding phone sex, she takes on the identity of "Kitty" and becomes an expert at navigating tricky calls. She moves into a hostel and experiences the freedom of big city life with her new friends Shazia and DJ Teja Gujjar. She hides this information from Dolly, who finds Kajal's line of work indecent and unfit for women from good families. Meanwhile, Dolly struggles with hypoactive sexual desire disorder, leading to lack of intimacy with Amit and frustration. Dolly sets up a meeting with her estranged mother to understand whether her sexual difficulties are genetic, but her mother denies having any sexual problems and encourages Dolly to discover herself and find her own freedom. Dolly also has to reckon with the cross-dressing tendencies of her younger son Pappu, which nearly gets him expelled from school. When Kajal's call center becomes the center of media attention, Dolly confronts her, and the two have a verbal blow-up.

Kajal develops a friendship with a man called Pradeep through the Red Rose Romance app. While on a trip to the Taj Mahal, she asks Pradeep to join him for a date, and they soon become intimate. Meanwhile Dolly strikes up a friendship with MBA student and delivery man Osmaan, and over several meetings they become close. When local political goons organize a raid on a well-known lovers' lane, Kajal and Pradeep are arrested for public indecency and taken to jail. Pradeep bribes the policemen and arranges himself to be freed, then disappears without a second thought for Kajal. She calls Dolly, who comes and picks her up. The two open up to each other, with Dolly speculating that her disorder is a result of a hymen re-stitching operation that she got to make it seem like she was still a virgin when she married Amit, and Kajal recounting her disappointment at her first sexual experience. Dolly expresses that it would be a great idea if an equivalent for Red Rose Romance existed for women. Later, Kajal tracks down Pradeep, only to find out that he's actually a married man called Chhatrasar Singh. When Shazia breaks up with Gujjar, Kajal becomes intimate with him and is able to achieve orgasm through oral sex.

Dolly becomes intimate with Osmaan. When they have sex, she enjoys it, realizing that her lack of sexual satisfaction with Amit is not a result of a clinical disorder, but stems from a lack of desire. Kajal's office is vandalized by the political goons, and several of the women working at the call center quit their jobs, fearing for their safety. Kajal, Dolly, and her family visit a local fair for the unveiling of a new structure by a feminist artist. Kajal comes across Pradeep, who promises to leave his family for her, but she rejects him. The new structure is the shape of a vagina, and the gathering is soon attacked by goons who deem it to be against Indian culture. In the resulting commotion, Shazia and Osmaan are shot dead. Kajal and Dolly grieve for them, and reconcile due to their shared grief.

Amit finds out about Dolly's affair, but wants to move on from it and resume the appearance of being in a normal family. However, Dolly explains that she is not attracted to him, and decides that she wants to separate. Her older son chooses to stay with Amit, but Pappu comes with her. Kajal goes back to her bosses, and they re-open the office and launch a new Red Rose app for women. The last shot of the film is Dolly and Pappu taking a bus ride out of town, recalling Dolly's own experience with her mother.

== Cast ==
- Konkona Sen Sharma as Radha "Dolly" Yadav
- Bhumi Pednekar as Kajal "Kitty" Yadav
- Vikrant Massey as Pradeep
- Amol Parashar as Osmaan Ansari
- Aamir Bashir as Amit Yadav
- Kubbra Sait as Shazia
- Karan Kundra as DJ Gurjar Teja
- Kalp Shah as Pappu
- Hearty Singh as Bharat
- Prabhat Raghunandan as Billa
- Neelima Azeem as Dolly's mother
- Pavleen Gujral as Julie "June"
- Shahnawaz Pradhan as Shree Ganashyam Pandey
- Sushil Bonthiyaal as Nitin Gupta
- Vikash Sharma as guy on call
- Nutan Surya as Nancy
- Ashwin Kushal as Gippi
- Kalyani Jha as Kitty's mother
- Mushtaq Khan as
- Kumar Amlendu Pathak as Mohan
- Minim Dey as Ruskana
- Sorabh Chauhan as Man with sick wife

== Production ==
In an interview with Kovid Gupta, Shrivastava mentioned that she wrote the first draft of the film while completing post-production on Lipstick Under My Burkha. The first look of the film was released on 15 October 2018 by producer Kapoor on her Twitter account. The principal photography of the film began on 15 October 2018.

== Release ==
The film is scheduled to release as direct digital release on Netflix in the wake of the COVID-19 pandemic. The film was premiered on Netflix on 18 September 2020.

== Soundtrack ==
Dolly Kitty Aur Woh Chamakte Sitare

Soundtrack album by Arjuna Harjai, Clinton Cerejo and Sadhu S Tiwari
- Released: 18 September 2020
- Recorded: 2018–19
- Genre: Feature film soundtrack
- Length: 10:33
- Language: Hindi
- Label: Balaji Telefilms Limited

The film's music was composed by Arjuna Harjai, Clinton Cerejo and Sadhu S Tiwari while lyrics written by Geet Sagar, Abhiruchi Chand and Siddharth Kaushal.

Track listing
No.	Title	Lyrics	Music	Singer(s)	Length
1.	"Neet Ve"	Geet Sagar	Arjun Harjai	Arjuna Harjai, Goldi Sohel, Geet Sagar	3:41
2.	"Khwabida"	Siddharth Kaushal	Clinton Cerejo	Meghna Mishra	2:43
3.	"Bimari"	Geet Sagar, Abhiruchi Chand	Arjun Harjai	Arjun Harjai, Geet Sagar, Veljion Noronha	1:57
4.	"Rap Battle" (Male Version)	Geet Sagar	Sadhu S Tiwari	Geet Sagar	1:22
5.	"Rap Battle" (Female Version)	Geet Sagar	Sadhu S Tiwari	Paroma Dasgupta	0:50
Total length:					10:33

== Reception ==
On the review aggregator website Rotten Tomatoes, 77% of 13 critics' reviews are positive, with an average rating of 6/10.

Sreeparna Sengupta from Times Of India rated the film 3.5 out of 5 stars and stated "Dolly Kitty Aur Woh Chamakte Sitare brings out the different shades to womanhood through its layered narrative and pushes one to be who they want to be. And damn it, if society has other dreams for you." Shubhra Gupta from The Indian Express gave the film 3.5 out of 5 stars and wrote "This is the kind of film which opens up spaces and dialogue around difficult topics, and raises the bar while doing so: give it many 'chamakte sitare' already."

Anna M. M. Vetticad from Firstpost expressed her views stating "If thematic courage, a soul and liberal ideals alone were the determining factors, then Dolly Kitty Aur Woh Chamakte Sitare would have deserved a thumbs up." Stutee Ghosh from The Quint stated "The screenplay is insightful and the lead actors - Konkona and Bhumi - admirably hold our attention."

== Accolades ==
Award (Note: Awards, festivals and organizations are in alphabetical order.)	Date of ceremony (Note: Date is linked to the article about the awards held that year, wherever possible.)	Category	Recipient(s)	Result	Ref.
Filmfare Awards	27 March 2021	Best Actress (Critics)	Konkona Sen Sharma	Nominated	
Filmfare Awards	27 March 2021	Best Actress (Critics)	Bhumi Pednekar	Nominated	
