= Khola Hawa =

- Theatrical Release Poster
- Directed by: Anup Das
- Screenplay by: Anup Das; Debasis Majumdar
- Story by: Anup Das
- Produced by: Dipak Nandy; Debabrato Banerjee; Moumita Nandy Chakraborty
- Starring: Rituparna Sengupta; Samadarshi Dutta; Lalita Chatterjee; Bidita Bag; Joy Sengupta; Ekavali Khanna; Saswati Guha Thakurata; Pradip Chakraborty
- Cinematography: Anil Chandel
- Edited by: Sanjib Dutta
- Music by: Neel Dutt
- Production company: White Mist Productions
- Distributed by: Shree Venkatesh Films
- Release date: 12 December 2014
- Running time: 123 minutes
- Country: India
- Language: Bengali

Khola Hawa is a 2014 Bengali film directed by Anup Das and produced by White Mist Productions. The film is a story about a middle aged housewife and a young guy. The film stars Rituparna Sengupta and Samadarshi Dutta in the lead roles, with Lalita Chatterjee, Saswati Guha Thakurata, Pradip Chakraborty, Ekavali Khanna, Bidita Bag & Joy Sengupta in supporting roles. Khola Hawa was released on 12 December 2014.

== Plot ==
The protagonist Aditi's unhappy marriage came to an end when her husband Pramit had an affair and wanted a divorce. Sayan, a scriptwriter for television soaps also had a break up. His longtime girlfriend Debjani dumped him for someone rich.

Aditi and Sayan met in Darjeeling in rather unusual circumstances. Hurt and desperately unhappy at the way her marriage came to an end, Aditi was attempting suicide when Sayan saved her. In spite of the differences in their age, they found some solace in each other and a friendship developed. A few days of fun filled adventure opened up their feelings. Slowly Aditi began to feel happy and alive. Sayan also began to overcome the anguish of the break up from Debjani. They realized the true meaning of life, and how wonderful it is to wake up next day. They decided to spend every moment of life happily. Both felt deeply attracted and romance brewed in between them. But Aditi hesitates. She loved him but was not quite convinced about marriage. Sayan explains that time has changed. Their age difference or Aditi having a child from previous marriage are no more a matter of worry in today's India.

Suddenly Aditi's husband arrives in Darjeeling and catches up with Aditi. He confessed to Aditi of his mistakes of thinking about the divorce. Aditi's husband pleads with her to take him back in her life and restart their life together. He insists that, it will also help their son as well. What she will do now? Her home of 6 years and many memories with their son and this new found sense of happiness – Aditi ponders for a few moments. It was not a difficult choice for her. She has found more joy and togetherness with Sayan than the years with her husband. One drove her to the verge of committing suicide and the other has given her promise of a new life.

== Cast ==
- Rituparna Sengupta as Aditi
- Samadarshi Dutta as Sayan
- Bidita Bag as Debjani
- Joy Sengupta as Pramit
- Ekavali Khanna as Monalisa

== Soundtrack ==
Khola Hawa

Soundtrack album by Neel Dutt
- Released: 2014
- Genre: Film soundtrack
- Language: Bengali
- Label: Junglee Music

Neel Dutt was the music director. Srijato wrote the lyrics. The album has 4 tracks. The music of Khola Hawa was released on 26 November 2014 at The Bengal Club in the presence of Rituparna Sengupta, Samadarshi Dutta, Neel Dutt, Rupankar Bagchi, and Anup Das.

Song title	Singers
"Ekta Jibawan Ektai Prithibi"	Rupankar Bagchi
"Tomake Firiye Diye"	Somlata Acharyya Chowdhury
"Kaal Je Ki Hobe"	Rupankar Bagchi
"Tomar Khola Hawa"	Somlata Acharyya Chowdhury
