= Ekavali Khanna =

Indian actress

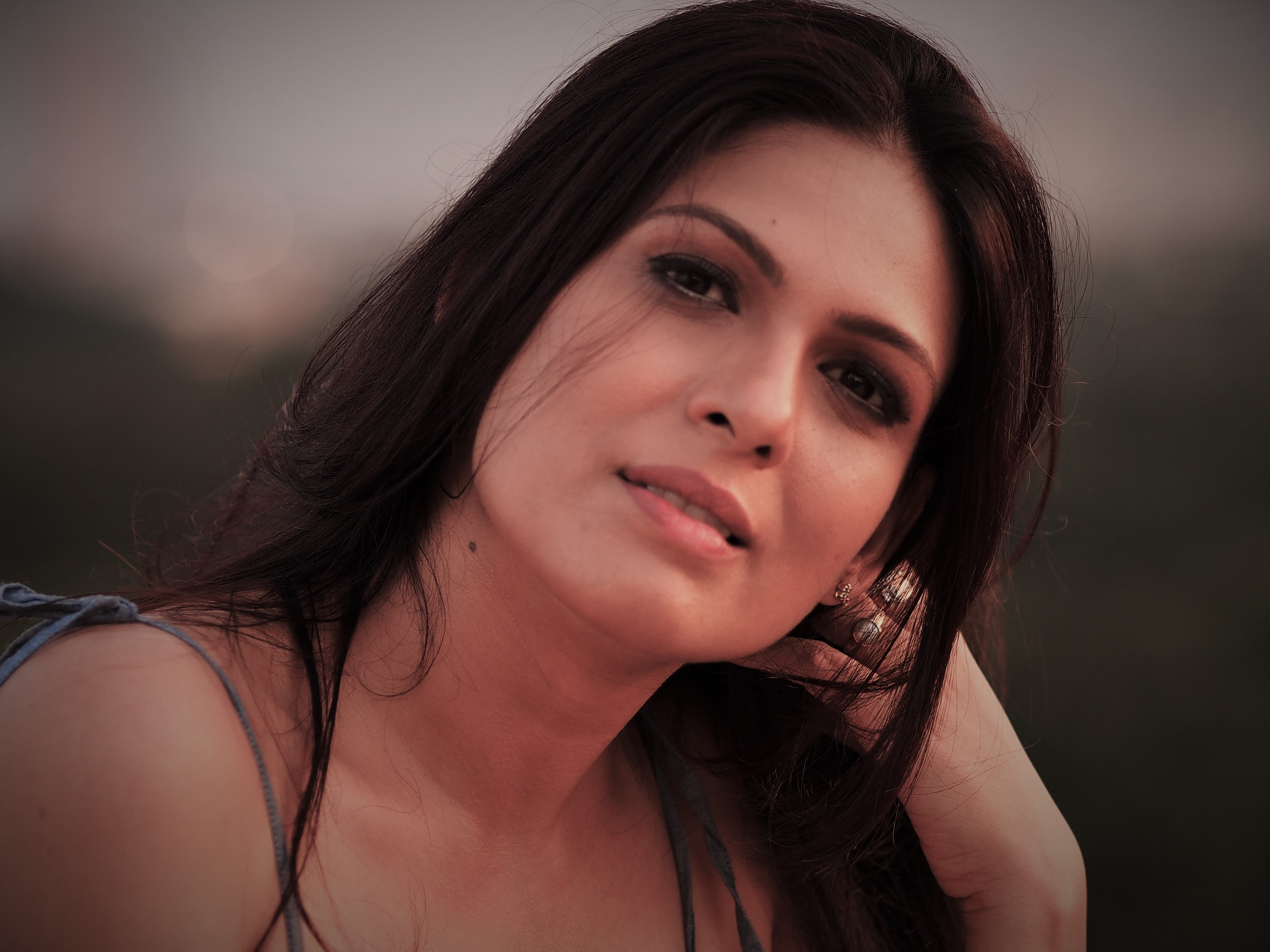
- Khanna in 2014
- Born: Calcutta, West Bengal, India
- Occupation: Actress
- Years active: 2009–present
- Children: 2

Ekavali Khanna is an actress who works primarily in Hindi and Bengali films.

== Personal life ==
Khanna was born and brought up in Calcutta (now Kolkata), West Bengal. Her father is a Punjabi and mother a Goan, and she culturally identifies as a Bengali.

Khanna has two sons.

== Filmography ==
Year	Title	Role	Language	Source
2010	Memories in March	Ekavali Khanna	English	
2013	Ganesh Talkies	Dolly	Bengali	
2014	Zed Plus	Saeeda	Hindi	
2014	Khola Hawa	Mona Lisa	Bengali	
2015	Katmundu	Bhanupriya	Bengali	
2015	Kaun Kitne Paani Mein	Gulabi	Hindi	
2016	Bollywood Diaries	Raveena	Hindi	
2016	Dear Dad	Nupur	Hindi	
2017	What Will People Say	Najma	Norwegian	
2017	Line of Descent	Naima	English/Hindi	
2018	Bioscopewala	Shobhita	Hindi	
2018	Veere Di Wedding	Paromita	Hindi	
2018	Angrezi Mein Kehte Hain	Kiran Batra	Hindi	
2020	The Prologue	Nandini	Bengali	
2023	The Lady Killer	Madhuri	Hindi	
2024	Chote Nawab	Mariam	Hindi	
2024	Vijay 69	Anna Matthews	Hindi	
2025	Durgapur Junction	DSP Gouri Singh	Bengali	
2025	Match Fixing	Rubia	Hindi	
2025	De De Pyaar De 2	Anita	Hindi	
2026	Ikkis	Maryam Nisar	Hindi	

Web series

- Out of Love (2019)
- Bombay Begums (2021)
- Kohrra (2023)
- Taskaree (2026)

== See also ==
- Cinema of India
- Bollywood
- Cinema of West Bengal
