= Bihar Mahila Samaj =

Women's organisation based in Bihar, India

- Logo of Bihar Mahila Samaj
- Founded: 1967
- Founder: Urmila Prasad, Nalini Rajimwale, Neelima Sarkar, Professor Gauri Ganguli
- Type: Women's organisation
- Purpose: Women's rights, social justice, gender equality
- Headquarters: Kedar Bhawan, Patna, Bihar, India
- Region served: Bihar, India
- Key people: Nivedita Jha (President)

Bihar Mahila Samaj is a women's organisation based in Bihar, India. The organisation works on issues related to women's rights, social justice, and gender equality. Its headquarters is located at Kedar Bhawan, Patna.

The organisation was founded in 1967 by Urmila Prasad, Nalini Rajimwale, Neelima Sarkar, and Professor Gauri Ganguli. It has been involved in campaigns related to women's empowerment and social reforms in Bihar.

Bihar Mahila Samaj has been associated with advocacy on issues such as women's safety, dowry prohibition, and legal accountability in cases concerning women's rights. The organisation is affiliated with the National Federation of Indian Women.

Journalist and social activist Nivedita Jha has served as the president of the organisation.

The organisation has participated in awareness campaigns and advocacy programmes related to women's rights and social justice in Bihar.

== See also ==
- Nivedita Jha
- National Federation of Indian Women
