= Ayush Tandon =

Ayush, on the sets of Kaisi Yeh Yaariaan

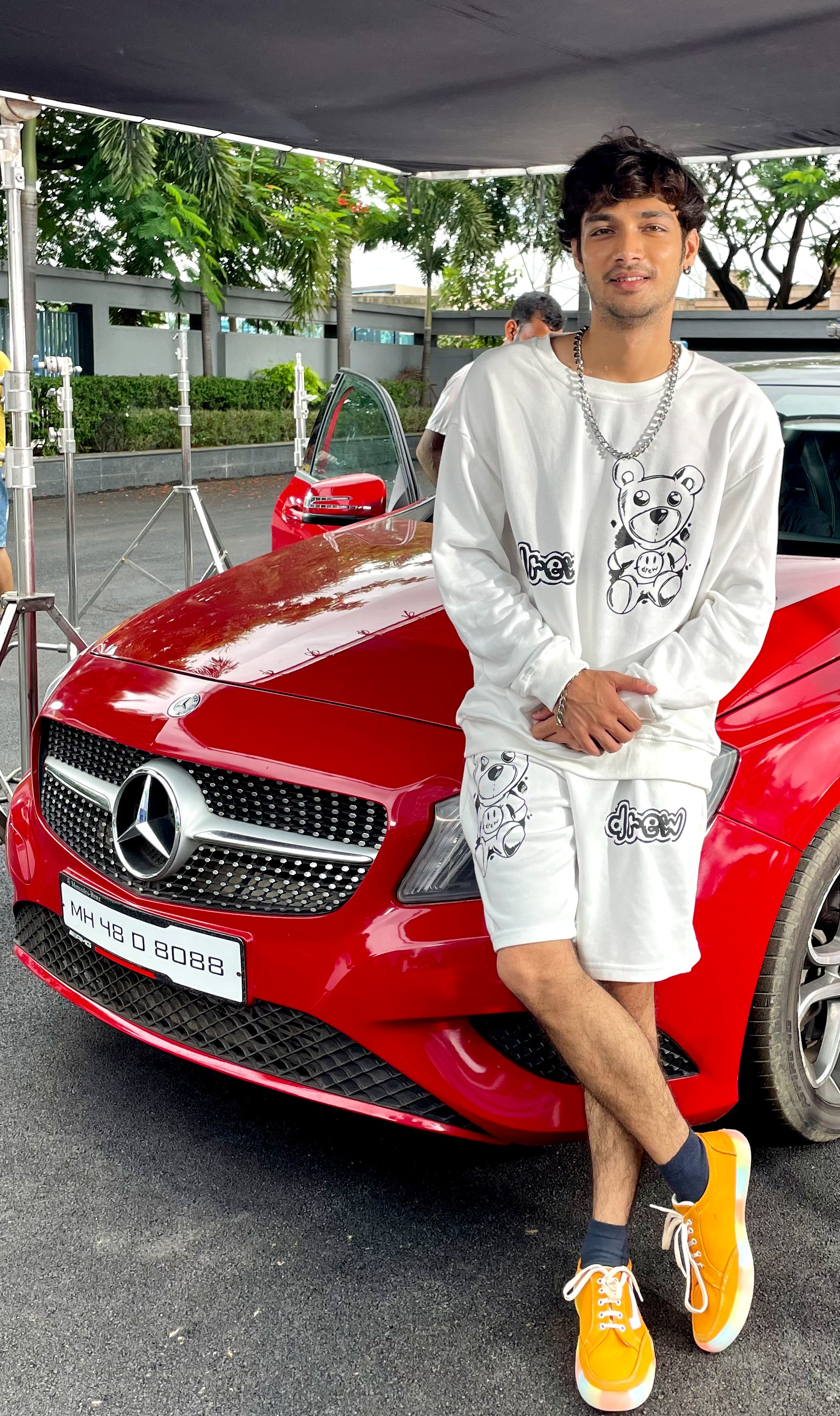
- Born: 31 July 1998 (age 28); Mumbai, India
- Occupation: Actor
- Years active: 2005–present

Ayush Tandon (born 31 July 1998) is an Indian actor, working in Bollywood and Hollywood films. He played Pi, age 12 in the 2012 Hollywood film Life of Pi. Ayush made his acting debut in the 2011 Bollywood film 7 Khoon Maaf. At the age of 10, he, along with Vasundhara Raturi entered as contestants in the first season of Chota Packet Bada Dhamaka and were declared as the winning jodi (team) during the grand finale which took place on 3 January 2009.

In 2013, Ayush made his music video debut with Labdiyaan, with co-actor Avneet Kaur under the music label Times Music.

Ayush Made his directorial debut with the documentary film (Dis)abled in 2017. Ayush also starred in a short film named She which was produced by Farhan Akhtar’s MARD (Men Against Rape and Discrimination), filmmaker Feroz Abbas Khan and Population Foundation of India (PFI) jointly. The short film was based on sexual harassment faced by women. The film was released online on 25 November 2018.

In April 2019, Ayush made his singing debut with the song 'Guzre Jo Lamhe'. The video for the song was directed by his Father, Hatinder Tandon, who also penned the lyrics.

== Personal life ==
Ayush was born an in Pune to his parents Hatinder Tandon and Asha Tandon. He cleared his Secondary School Certificate (SSC) board exams in the year 2014, scoring 87 percent and is currently a student at Annasaheb Vartak College of Arts, Commerce and Science.

== Filmography ==
=== Film ===
Year	Title	Role
2011	7 Khoon Maaf	Young Arun
2012	Life of Pi	Pi, age 11
2015	Bajirao Mastani	Nana Saheb
2017	(Dis)Abled (Documentary)	
2018	She (Short Film)	
2024	Chote Nawab	Imaan
2026	Ramayana: Part 1	Hindi Voice for Young Dashanan

=== Web series ===
Year	Title	Role	OTT Platform
2020	Special OPS	Sohail	Disney+ Hotstar
2022	Kaisi Yeh Yaariaan (season 4)	Advait	Voot
2023	Kaisi Yeh Yaariaan (season 5)	Advait	JioCinema

=== Reality Television ===
Year	Title	Remark
2006-07	Boogie Woogie Kids Championship	Contestant
2008-09	Chota Packet Bada Dhamaka	Winner
