= Muzaffarpur shelter case =

Incident of sexual assault in Bihar's shelter home

The Muzaffarpur shelter case refers to a shelter home that ran under a non-governmental organization called "Sewa Sankalp Evam Vikas Samiti" at Muzaffarpur, Bihar, where cases of sexual abuse, rape and torture were reported. In a medical examination, sexual abuse of 34 out of 42 of the girls living at the shelter was confirmed. A first information report (FIR) was lodged against 12 people on 31 May 2018. Brajesh Thakur was the chief of the state-funded NGO, ran several other NGOs and a Hindi newspaper called Pratah Kamal. Because of the political connections of Brajesh Thakur and the involvement of government officials and the apparent delay in investigation and CBI interference, the case drew criticism of Nitish Kumar's government by opposition and the Supreme Court of India.

== Discovery ==
In May 2018, reports of repeated sexual abuse of inmates at a short-stay home in Muzaffarpur, India, surfaced after Mumbai’s Tata Institute of Social Sciences (TISS) carried out a social audit of shelter homes across Bihar for 2017. The audit report pointed to sexual abuse of girls at the Muzaffarpur short-stay home. TISS submitted its report in April 2018 and the government after its review registered the FIR on 31 May. Following the expose, the girls were rescued from the shelter home and shifted to Madhubani, Patna and Mokama.

Later, the medical board of Patna Medical College Hospital (PMCH) in June confirmed the sexual abuse of a majority of the girls of the ‘Balika Grih’. Brajesh Thakur, the main accused in the Muzaffarpur shelter home rape case, was booked in another case after it was found that 11 women were missing from another shelter home his NGO ran. Of the 42 girls housed at Balika Grih, medical tests confirmed sexual assault on 34. While girls were allegedly forced to undergo abortion, one was allegedly killed and buried on the shelter home campus. In late June the authorities dug the vacant space inside the Muzaffarpur short-stay home over allegations that one girl was allegedly killed and buried after an argument with the staff. The authorities, however, did not find any human body.

On 2 August 2018, Supreme Court of India took a suo moto cognizance in the Muzaffarpur shelter home case.

Brajesh Thakur is the prime accused in Muzaffarpur shelter home case where 34 girls, aged between 7 and 17, were raped for months. Ten out of 11 accused have been arrested, including Thakur and the then district child protection officer. They are to be tried under the POCSO act. The case was later transferred to the CBI which has taken over the probe and has obtained all relevant documents from the local police. A public interest litigation (PIL) regarding alleged abuse in several shelter homes in Bihar mentioned in the Tata Institute of Social Sciences (TISS) report was filed in the Supreme Court by journalist Nivedita Jha, seeking a court-monitored investigation and registration of FIRs.

== Trial and verdict ==
On the directions of Supreme Court's CJI Ranjan Gogoi bench, the case, as requested by CBI, was transferred in February 2019 from a local court in Muzaffarpur to the POCSO court at Saket district court in Delhi. SC asked the Saket court to conclude the trial within six months.

The court, in 1,546 page judgment, convicted Brajesh Thakur and 18 others, in January 2020. Thakur was convicted and sentenced to life imprisonment for offences under Indian Penal Code sections 120-B (criminal conspiracy), 324 (causing hurt by dangerous weapons or means), 323 (voluntarily causing hurt) and those relating to abetment, Section 21 (failure to report commission of an offence) of the POCSO Act and Section 75 (cruelty to child) of the Juvenile Justice Act.

Shaista Praveen, Indu Kumari, Minu Devi, Manju Devi, Chanda Devi, Neha Kumari, Hema Masih, Kiran Kumari were held guilty of criminal conspiracy, abetment to rape, cruelty to child and failure to report commission of an offence. Dillip Kumar Verma, Ravi Roshan, Vikas Kumar, Vijay Kumar Tiwari, Rama Shankar Singh, Ashwani, Guddu Patel, Kishan Kumar and Ramanuj Thakur were also held guilty in the case on various counts.

Thakur challenged the verdict in the Delhi High Court in July 2020. His appeal alleged that the Bihar Police and the CBI failed to conduct a "potency test," a requirement in cases of rape, and that "despite examining his wife" under section 161 of the Cr.P.C., her statement was not placed on record by the prosecution.

In January 2025, Thakur, Shaista Praveen, and Krishna Kumar were acquitted in a case related to eleven missing women and four missing girls "due to lack of evidence." All three continue to serve life in prison for sexual and physical assault of girls at the shelter home.

== Reactions ==
On 3 August 2018, the Supreme Court of India reprimanded media organizations for repeatedly interviewing the victims to avoid traumatizing them and asked for pictures not to be published, even in morphed form.

On 4 August 2018, some political parties led a statewide strike in Bihar, which was also supported by the Congress and RJD. There was a protest at Jantar Mantar at New Delhi, organized by 12 different political parties together, in a show of unity.

Ruling party JD(U) has fielded controversial former state cabinet minister Manju Verma, who had resigned over shelter case row, as a candidate in 2020 Bihar Legislative Assembly election. Though CBI gave a clean chit to Manju Verma and her husband Chandrasekhar Verma, publicly available data, for instance, Call Data Records show that "Chandrasekhar Verma and Brajesh Thakur spoke to each other more than 17 times between January and May 2018." Also, the fact that "Manju Verma had gone into hiding" when Brajesh Thakur was arrested in June 2018 continues to be used as a political weapon to cast aspersions on Verma's innocence. However, speaking to a news outlet, she said that she should have been given credit for exposing the scandal, for she, as a minister of the department "ordered the social audit of shelter homes and the report exposed the scandal. I personally visited the shelter home once, and at that time, everything looked okay."

More so, investigative news reports on the handling of case by CBI do not exalt Vermas and the investigating agency. According to The Caravan's series of reports, CBI "ignored crucial leads from the Bihar police." Reports find that the CBI never investigated the connection between Verma and one Poonam Sinha of Integrated Child Protection Scheme, whose possible complicity was indicated by Ravi Roshan (also pronounced as 'Raushan'), a convict in the case. In contrast, CBI turned "Sinha into a witness instead of an accused."

The supervision report said, "further Raushan said that Manju Verma, Amaresh Kumar Amar (PA to minister) and Poonam Sinha, who was earlier child district protection officer and is now an assistant director in the Ministry; It was Poonam who used to talk to all the directors." Raushan alleged that the witness statements against him were "a conspiracy" by Verma and Sinha, since the counsellor who filed the complaint against him was Sinha’s sister. He claimed that Verma and Sinha were trying to frame him to save themselves.

— Sagar, "House of Horrors" in The Caravan

In one of reports in the series, containing exclusively accessed statements of 33 victims, The Caravan refutes the claim of CBI that no children were murdered in the shelter-home.

Brijesh killed one girl and put her in a tank. Brijesh through [two other victims] and Meenu Aunty got a mentally challenged girl [name redacted] killed. Brijesh had told them, "If you don’t kill her, I will kill you." Brijesh killed her by stepping on her neck and [the two others] and Meenu had held her limbs. After the death, Meenu Aunty had her thrown into a gunny bag. I saw through a window. If someone asked, it was told that a dog has died.

— One of victims in the shelter-home case.

== In popular media ==
- Bhakshak is a 2024 Netflix film made on this case, where Muzaffarpur has been changed into pseudonym "Munnawarpur".
