= Bhakshak =

2024 Indian Hindi film by Pulkit

- Official release poster
- Directed by: Pulkit
- Written by: Jyotsana Nath; Pulkit
- Produced by: Gauri Khan; Gaurav Verma
- Starring: Bhumi Pednekar; Sanjay Mishra; Aditya Srivastava; Sai Tamhankar
- Cinematography: Kumar Sourabh
- Edited by: Zubin Sheikh
- Music by: Songs: Anurag Saikia; Anuj Garg; Background Score: Clinton Cerejo; Bianca Gomes
- Production company: Red Chillies Entertainment
- Distributed by: Netflix
- Release date: 9 February 2024
- Running time: 135 minutes
- Country: India
- Language: Hindi

Bhakshak (transl. Devourer) is a 2024 Indian Hindi language crime thriller film based on the Muzaffarpur shelter case. It is directed by Pulkit and produced by Gauri Khan and Gaurav Verma under banner Red Chillies Entertainment, the film stars Bhumi Pednekar, Sanjay Mishra, Aditya Srivastava and Sai Tamhankar. It premiered on Netflix on 9 February 2024. Mishra won National Film Award for Best Actor in a Supporting Role for his portrayal of the journalist.

== Plot ==
The story of Vaishali, a journalist, who uncovers a dark secret at a shelter home in Munawwarpur, Bihar. She learns about young girls being abused there. Vaishali faces many obstacles as she tries to expose the truth, including threats to her family. With the help of a courageous girl named Sudha and a supportive police officer named SS Jasmeet Kaur, Vaishali fights against the powerful people involved in the abuse. Eventually, justice prevails, and the perpetrators are brought to light. The film sheds light on the importance of standing up against injustice and fighting for what's right.

== Cast ==
- Bhumi Pednekar as Vaishali Singh
- Sanjay Mishra as Baskar Sinha
- Aditya Srivastava as Bansi Sahu
- Sai Tamhankar as SSP Jasmeet Kaur
- Surya Sharma as Arvind Singh
- Durgesh Kumar as Guptaji
- Chittaranjan Tripathy as Mithilesh Sinha
- Tanisha Mehta as Sudha Kumari, Vaishali's friend
- Satyakam Anand as Sonu
- Vibha Chibbar as Rajni Singh
- Pravin Kumar Sisodia as Brijmohan Singh
- Murari Kumar as Baccha Babu
- Samta Sudiksha as Gudiya
- Gulista Alija as Baby Rani
- Shakti Sinha as Pappu Thekedar
- Danish Iqbal as Suresh Singh
- Pubali Sanyal as Mamta Singh
- Farheen Khan as Seema Singh
- Aditya Uppal as IG Sagar Pratap
- Anurag as Prabhat Kumar
- Brijbhushan Shukla as Party Worker
- Prabhat Lehri as Inspector Daroga
- Shammi Jaffery as Shobha Sahu
- Anand Sharma as CM Jitesh Kumar
- Anuj Mishra as Ssp Assistant
- Ekram Khan as Prakash Sinha
- Umesh Kumar Shukla as Radheshyam
- Mahesh Chandra Deva as Seva grih doctor
- Amit Sinha as Umesh Kumar
- Ronak Pandey as Bhaskar's Son
- Punita Awasthi as Bhaskar's Wife
- Ankit Singh as Nafisa
- Shiv Mohan as Novelty security guard
- Dinesh Trivedi as Paan shop owner
- Sunil Kanal as Dom Maharaj
- Ajay Singh as Rajni Singh's Assistant
- Preeti Shukla as Samaj Kalyan Ministry

== Production ==
=== Filming ===
Principal photography commenced in January 2022 and wrapped only 39 days in February 2022.

== Music ==
Bhakshak

Soundtrack album by Anurag Saikia and Anuj Garg
- Released: 9 February 2024
- Recorded: 2023
- Genre: Feature film soundtrack
- Length: 17:16
- Language: Hindi
- Label: Zee Music Company

Official audio
- Bhakshak - Full Album on YouTube

The music of the film is composed by Anurag Saikia and Anuj Garg. While lyrics written by Raj Shekhar and Anuj Garg.

Track listing
No.	Title	Singer(s)	Length
1.	"Ganga"	Megha Sriram Dalton, Anurag Saikia	3:35
2.	"Shamil Hai"	Romy, Anurag Saikia	7:17
3.	"Chanda" (Music and lyrics by Anuj Garg)	Yajat Garg	6:24
Total length:			17:16

== Reception ==
=== Critical reception ===
On the review aggregator website Rotten Tomatoes, 50% of 16 critics' reviews are positive, with an average rating of 5.6/10.

Deepa Gahlot from Rediff.com awarded the film 3/5 stars and wrote "Bhakshak should create some awareness and maybe raise some compassion towards victims of abuse." Bollywood Hungama gave the film 3.5/5 stars and wrote "Bhakshak is a no-nonsense gripping investigative thriller and rests on the powerful performances of Bhumi Pednekar, Sanjay Mishra and Aditya Srivastava. It also gives a nice tribute to the small-town journalists who often risk their lives while trying to break stories that matter." Renuka Vyavahare of The Times of India gave a rating of 2.5/5 stars, but said, "Bhumi Pednekar is solid in this stilted social drama". Indian Express' Shubhra Gupta wrote, "The Bhumi Pednekar film is saddled with basic story-telling and zero nuance", giving it 2/5 stars.
