= Dhairya =

Wikimedia disambiguation page

Dhairya may refer to:

- Dhairya Dand (born 1989) Indian-American inventor
- Dhairya Karwa (born 1990) Indian actor
