= Stutee Ghosh =

Indian film critic and Radio host

- Education: Delhi University
- Occupations: Film critic Radio personality
- Known for: Film Criticism; Talk Show host
- Awards: India radio forum best Rj award

Stutee Ghosh is an Indian film critic, political satirist, writer and radio personality who works for The Quint Digital Media Limited from New Delhi, India. She is also a celebrity chat show host with Hindustan Times Digital.

== Career ==
While doing her post graduation in English literature from Delhi University, she started working as a radio host with Fever 104fm and film criticism with The Quint.

== Awards ==
- She won the India radio forum best Rj award
