= Lipstick Under My Burkha =

2016 Indian film by Alankrita Shrivastava

- Theatrical release poster
- Directed by: Alankrita Shrivastava
- Screenplay by: Alankrita Shrivastava
- Story by: Alankrita Shrivastava
- Produced by: Prakash Jha; JB Angels
- Starring: Ratna Pathak; Konkona Sen Sharma; Aahana Kumra; Plabita Borthakur
- Cinematography: Akshay Singh
- Edited by: Charu Shree Roy
- Music by: Zebunnisa Bangash; Mangesh Dhakde (score)
- Production company: Prakash Jha Productions
- Distributed by: ALT Entertainment
- Release dates: October 2016 (Mumbai Film Festival); 21 July 2017
- Running time: 117 minutes
- Country: India
- Language: Hindi
- Budget: ₹6 crore
- Box office: ₹26.68 crore

Lipstick Under My Burkha is a 2016 Indian Hindi-language dark comedy film written and directed by Alankrita Shrivastava and produced by Prakash Jha. The film stars Ratna Pathak, Konkona Sen Sharma, Aahana Kumra and Plabita Borthakur, while Sushant Singh, Sonal Jha, Vikrant Massey, Shashank Arora, Vaibhav Tatwawaadi and Jagat Singh Solanki play supportive roles. The movie shows the secret lives of four women who are in search of their freedom. Even after facing all the odds and obstacles in their way, they still manage to find their way to claim their desires through small acts of courage.

The first trailer was released on 14 October 2016. The film was initially denied a release in India in January 2017, after the country's Central Board of Film Certification (CBFC) refused a certificate, stating that "There are contagious sexual scenes, abusive words, audio pornography, and a bit of a sensitive touch about one particular section of society." The film premiered at the Tokyo and Mumbai Film Festivals, where it won the Spirit of Asia Prize and the Oxfam Award for Best Film on Gender Equality. The film received two nominations at the 63rd Filmfare Awards, including Best Film (Critics) and Best Supporting Actress for Ratna Pathak.

== Plot ==
The story follows four women's lives in the same neighbourhood. Rosy is introduced as the heroine of an erotic pulp fiction novel titled Lipstick Dreams. Throughout the film, her story is narrated by a 55-year-old widow, Usha Parmar, as she reads the novel in secrecy. In a small neighborhood in Bhopal, Usha serves as the old matriarch.

Rehana sews burkhas for her family's store. She steals make-up to wear at college where she takes off the burkha, which she is forced to wear by her family, and transforms into a jeans-wearing singer who loves Miley Cyrus.

Leela is a young beautician who runs her own parlor. She wishes to travel the world with her secret lover, Arshad, who runs a small photo studio. She frequently arranges meetings with professional destination wedding businesses and offers her make-up services and Arshad's photography, in the hopes of free world-wide travel for both of them.

Shireen is a burkha-wearing house-wife secretly working as a door-to-door sales-woman. Her husband, Rahim, is sexually-abusive and forbids the use of contraceptives, due to which she gets multiple secret abortions and emergency contraceptives. Rahim uses Shireen only to satisfy his sexual urges, while she yearns for affection.

Rehana participates in the ongoing protest against the ban on jeans. Later, Rehana is pleasantly surprised when Namrata invites her to a weekend house party. To prepare for the event, Rehana steals a dress and boots from the mall.

At the request of Leela's impoverished mother, Usha arranges for Leela's marriage with a man named Manoj. On the day of her engagement, Leela has sex with Arshad and films it on her cellphone. Her mother catches her and scolds her for tarnishing their reputation. It is revealed that Leela's mother makes her living as a nude model for art students.

Usha is pranked at the swimming pool and almost drowns. She is rescued by the swimming instructor Jaspal, who suggests that she take lessons. Usha begins to fantasize about Jaspal and buys a swimsuit to begin taking lessons from him. She eventually engages in phone sex with him, under the alias "Rosy". Jaspal is under the impression that Rosy is Komal, a young girl in his class.

Shireen discovers she has an infection in her uterus and that she should only use condoms as a contraceptive, but her husband Rahim refuses to use them. Shireen's colleague urges her to tell Rahim about her job so that she can secure a promotion and work full-time in an office. In her attempts to confront Rahim about her job, Shireen discovers that he is cheating on her. She follows the woman to her home, where she subtly warns her to keep a distance from Rahim and introduces herself as his wife. Rehana attends the house party and while drunk, she becomes affectionate with Dhruv. She also discovers that Namrata is pregnant. Rehana is arrested alongside other college students as she participates in another protest against the jeans ban; however, she manages to handle the situation and receives only a warning from her strictly religious father. Leela tries to convince Arshad to elope with her, but he rebukes her, and Leela's mother advances the date of her wedding.

Usha invites Jaspal to the community's Diwali festival. Rehana also decides to go on a date with Dhruv at the same festival, while Namrata is shown to be recovering from an abortion. Leela attends the festival with Manoj and successfully makes Arshad jealous by kissing Manoj at his photo booth. Arshad kisses Leela when Manoj leaves to get snacks and promises that he will elope with her. Despite this, she attempts to get over him and tries to have sex with Manoj inside the car, who says he wishes to wait until their wedding night. Later, Manoj discovers Leela's sex tape with Arshad and breaks off their engagement. The police reveal footage from the mall's security cameras, proving Rehana's theft, and arrest her. Dhruv distances himself from Rehana, and Namrata reveals that Dhruv was responsible for her pregnancy. Rehana is bailed by her father, who is ashamed of her and forbids her from returning to college while asking her mother to start looking for prospective grooms.

As Shireen is receiving her promotion, Rahim walks in to coldly congratulate her before he takes her home and rapes her as punishment. He mocks her and tells her to quit her job and stay at home. Usha decides to wear a sleeveless blouse and sari. She gets waxed with the help of Leela and gets her grey hair dyed black. Usha spends some time with Jaspal, who eagerly searches for Komal. He is bewildered when he tries to flirt with Komal and she responds by publicly shaming him. Jaspal realizes that Usha is "Rosy" when he finds her novel by the swimming pool and confronts her family, accusing her of sexually exploiting him. They raid Usha's room and condemn her for ruining their reputation before they throw her erotic novels and swimsuit on the street as the neighbourhood watches.

Rehana, Leela, and Shireen help Usha gather her belongings from the road, and Usha asks Rehana to finish reading the last few pages of Lipstick Dreams. The four ladies reflect on each of their repressions as they pass a cigarette amongst them and revel in their collective desire for freedom.

== Cast ==
- Ratna Pathak as Usha "Rosy" Buaji
- Konkana Sen Sharma as Shireen Aslam
- Plabita Borthakur as Rehana Abidi
- Aahana Kumra as Leela
- Shashank Arora as Dhruv, Rehana's boyfriend
- Sushant Singh as Rahim Aslam, Shireen's husband
- Vikrant Massey as Arshad, Leela's boyfriend
- Vaibhav Tatwawaadi as Manoj, Leela’s fiancé
- Sonal Jha as Leela's mother
- Mayur More as Michael Jackson aka mj
- Jagat Singh Solanki as Jaspal
- Anwar Khan as Abidi
- Namita Dubey as Namrata
- Rajesh Tiwari as Ram
- Ahmed Khan as Madanlal
- Preeti Kochhar as Zeba
- Garima Goel as Preeti
- Disha Arora as Fatima
- Jatin Jaiswal as Lakhan
- Sonal Joshi as Sita
- Vyoma Parihar as Lakshmi
- Sahiba Vij as Chanda
- Saurabh Pandey as Veer
- Disha Patwa as Komal

== Screening ==
Lipstick Under My Burkha was screened at the Mumbai Film Festival that was held 20–27 October 2016. It was also screened at the Tokyo Film Festival that was held from 25 October to 3 November 2016. The film has notably earned eleven international film festival awards prior to its official release. As of July 2017, it has been screened in over 35 film festivals across the world. The world premiere was at the Tokyo International Film Festival, while the Indian premiere was at the Mumbai Film Festival.

== Release ==
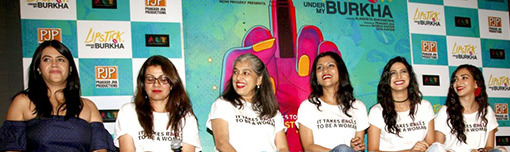
Ekta Kapoor, Alankrita Shrivastava, Ratna Pathak, Konkona Sen Sharma, Aahana Kumra & Plabita Borthakur at media meet of the film LUMB.

The film was initially denied a release in India in January 2017, after the country's Central Board of Film Certification (CBFC) refused a certificate, stating that "There are contagious [sic] sexual scenes, abusive words, audio pornography and a bit sensitive touch about one particular section of society". The filmmakers appealed this decision to the Film Certification Appellate Tribunal (FCAT). The FCAT viewed the film and communicated its concerns to the film producers on 27 May 2017. The film producers came back to FCAT with a list of 16 voluntary cuts that addressed the raised concerns. In addition to the 16 cuts, the FCAT suggested some more cuts and directed the CBFC to issue an A certificate to the movie following the changes.

Shrivastava told Agence-France Presse: "Of course I would have loved no cuts, but the FCAT has been very fair and clear. I feel that we will be able to release the film without hampering the narrative or diluting its essence." The second official trailer released on 27 June 2017. The film was released in 400 screens on 21 July 2017 in India. The film was made at a budget of ₹ 6 crore.

=== India ===
In an interview with Kovid Gupta, Shrivastava mentioned that she did not make the film "with the intention of teaching or preaching" but was glad that "it was able to start a discussion!" Stutee Ghosh of The Quint gave 4.5/5 stars and said, "These women and their lipstick dreams will stay with us long after the film is over. How many films can claim to do that? Worth all the hype and more Lipstick Under My Burkha is a must watch." Deepali Arya of Desi Martini gave 4.5/5 stars and said, "The narrative and story-telling is mature and powerful and it holds a mirror to the society without being too didactic or moralistic." Nihit Bhave of Times of India gave 4/5 stars and said, "The women portraying these lives on screen give Lipstick... its true color. Plabita and Aahana are instantly relatable and light up the screen. Konkona’s helplessness makes you think about every woman who is a second-class citizen in her own home. And Ratna’s infatuated Usha, a woman in the throes of passion, will make you look at older women in a new light." Mayank Shekhar of Mid-Day gave 4/5 stars and said, "The issues and lives in this film are evidently universal enough to be viewed and loved at film festivals and audiences across the globe." Kriti Tulsiani of News18 India gave 4/5 stars and said, "The strength of this film, however, lies in Alankrita Shrivastava’s handling of the subject. She doesn’t provide us with answers, or with superficial solutions, but just offers us a narrative, bold enough to arouse a woman’s hidden desires and valiant enough to question the patriarch mindset." Raya Ghosh of Times Now gave 4/5 stars and said "It is a cinematic masterpiece as such that it is comic and sympathetic - Alankrita Shrivastava scrutinises every corner and empathy to inculcate a stirring account of women’s empowerment." Shreemi Verma of MissMalini gave 4/5 stars and said, "I don’t think there’s ever a dull moment in this fearlessly feminist film. Lipstick Under My Burkha took its time to find a way to Indian theaters, it’s our job now to make it stay for a while." Smrity Sharma of India.com gave 4/5 stars and said, "Their emotions, frustrations, anger and desires bear a universal appeal. Women watching the film would be able to relate to the stories of at least one of these women and this fact alone wins for the film." Prashant Jain of Navbharat Times gave 4/5 stars and said, "Director Alankrita Shrivastav has shown in the film that in our society, the story of the sorrows of women is the same, even if it is to follow any religion, whether it is a virgin, a married or an old man."

Sweta Kaushal of Hindustan Times gave 3.5/5 stars and said, "Every character in the film deals with different kinds of prejudices and restrictions but eventually, they prove to be the same - curbing the freedom of women. The small town setting enables the four characters to be part of each others’ lives and eventually come together." Shubhra Gupta of The Indian Express gave 3.5/5 stars and said, "What makes the film it is, is the upfront, frank manner in which female desire and fantasy are treated, running like a strong, vital thread through the film. Dreams can keep you alive, and age is just a number." Tushar P Joshi of BollywoodLife.com gave 3.5/5 stars and said, "Lipstick Under My Burkha will hopefully bring to light some issues that need attention and start a discussion or a conversation between women who are struggling for the most basic right in life – one to be happy." Rohit Bhatnagar of The Asian Age gave 3.5/5 stars and said, "The film touches upon serious issues but with a humorous flair. This tale of women's equality and liberation is a mirror of real India." Madhuri of Filmibeat gave 3.5/5 stars and said, "If you are looking out for some power-packed content then, opt for this bold shade of lipstick which has a long-lasting impact!"

Harshada Rege of Daily News and Analysis gave 3/5 stars and said, "The characters are well-etched and whether you live in metro or a smaller town, every woman will identify. Alankrita holds the reins of this bold film with aplomb."

Prince Mejel of Currently Globally applauded the movie for its bold content and said, Lipstick under my Burkha is "Not a question to religious fundamentalists but, a slap to the society which we are part of. "

=== International ===
On review aggregator website Rotten Tomatoes, the film holds an approval rating of 93% based on 10 reviews, and an average rating of 7/10.

== Box office ==
The film released in India on the same day as Munna Michael with merely 400 screens. Media speculated this clash to affect the business of this film, as the latter released across 3000 screens with a star cast. Lipstick Under My Burkha earned ₹1.22 crore on its opening day. The controversy with the CBFC generated enough hype from the media, and a strong positive word of mouth from various critics attracted the audience. The film witnessed growth in the first weekend earnings and also held strong hold on weekdays. On first and second weekday, it earned ₹1.28 and ₹1.36 crore respectively which are higher than its opening day earning, becoming one of the rare films having stronger weekday earning than opening weekend in the Indian box office. It recovered its cost of production within four days of release, and earned ₹10.96 crore in the first week. The film was a commercial success and was declared as an "Hit" by the box office.

== Accolades ==
Award	Category	Recipient(s) and nominee(s)	Result	Ref.
Filmfare Awards	Best Film (Critics)	Lipstick Under My Burkha	Nominated	
Filmfare Awards	Best Supporting Actress	Ratna Pathak Shah	Nominated	
Ottawa Indian Film Festival	Best Achievement in Acting Award	Ratna Pathak Shah	Won	
London Asian Film Festival	Standout Performance	Ratna Pathak Shah	Won	
London Asian Film Festival	Best Film	Lipstick Under My Burkha	Won	
Tokyo International Film Festival	Spirit of Asia Prize	Lipstick Under My Burkha	Won	
Mumbai Film Festival	Oxfam Award for Best Film on Gender Equality	Lipstick Under My Burkha	Won	
CinemAsia Film Festival	Best Feature Audience Choice	Lipstick Under My Burkha	Won	
Glasgow International Film Festival	Audience Award Best Film	Lipstick Under My Burkha	Won	
Films des Femmes Creteil	Best Feature Film	Lipstick Under My Burkha	Won	
Cines del Sur - Granada Film Festival	Best Feature Audience Award	Lipstick Under My Burkha	Won	
TVE Global Sustainability Film Awards	Founder’s Award for Sustainability on the Big Screen	Lipstick Under My Burkha	Won	
Washington International Film Festival	Best International Feature	Lipstick Under My Burkha	Nominated	
Festival of Five Continents	Best Feature Film	Lipstick Under My Burkha	Nominated	
Indian Film Festival of Melbourne	Best Indie Film	Lipstick Under My Burkha	Won	
Indian Film Festival of Melbourne	Best Director	Alankrita Shrivastava	Nominated	
Indian Film Festival of Melbourne	Best Actress	Ratna Pathak Shah	Nominated	
Indian Film Festival of Melbourne	Best Actress	Konkona Sen Sharma	Won	
New York Indian Film Festival	Best Actress	Konkona Sen Sharma	Won	
Star Screen Awards	Best Actress (Critics)	Konkona Sen Sharma	Won	
Star Screen Awards	Best Actress (Critics)	Ratna Pathak Shah	Nominated	
Star Screen Awards	Most Promising Newcomer - Female	Plabita Borthakur	Nominated	
Star Screen Awards	Best Actor in a Supporting Role – Female	Aahana Kumra	Nominated	
Star Screen Awards	Best Film (Critics)	Lipstick Under My Burkha	Nominated	
Star Screen Awards	Best Director	Alankrita Shrivastava	Nominated	
Cleveland International Film Festival	Best Female Director	Alankrita Shrivastava	Nominated	
Zee Cine Awards	Best Supporting Actress	Ratna Pathak Shah	Nominated	
Zee Cine Awards	Best Supporting Actress	Konkona Sen Sharma	Nominated	
