= Alankrita Shrivastava =

Indian screenwriter, director and producer

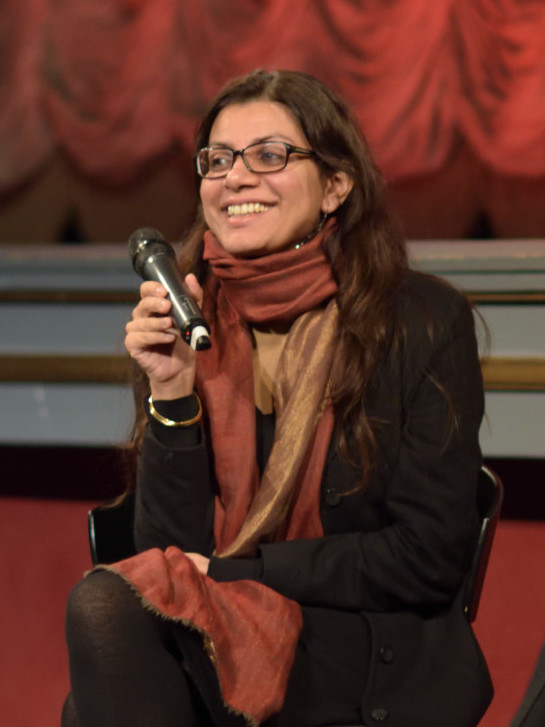
- Shrivastava at Stockholm Film Festival in 2016
- Born: 21 August 1979 (age 47)
- Occupations: Director, screenwriter

Alankrita Shrivastava is an Indian screenwriter, director and producer. Having made her debut as a director in 2011, she has since won accolades such as the Grand Prix at the Créteil International Women's Film Festival and a nomination for a Filmfare Award for the critically acclaimed film Lipstick Under My Burkha.

Shrivastava studied filmmaking at Jamia Milia Islamia in New Delhi and later moved to Mumbai. She began working as an associate director for Prakash Jha. After assisting Jha on notable projects including Apharan (2005) and Rajneeti (2010), Shrivastava made her directorial debut with 2011 film Turning 30. She later received widespread praise for the black comedy Lipstick Under My Burkha, which she directed and wrote. The film earned her, among other accolades, a nomination at the Filmfare Awards.

== Early life and education ==
Alankrita Shrivastava was born on 21 August 1979 in New Delhi, India. She spent her early years in Dehradun, Uttarakhand, where she attended Welham Girls' School. After completing her schooling, she moved back to New Delhi and graduated from Lady Shri Ram College.

She pursued her postgraduate studies in filmmaking at the Jamia Millia Islamia.

== Career ==
Shrivastava moved to Mumbai to pursue a career in filmmaking and soon began working as associate director for Prakash Jha. She assisted Jha on such films as Gangaajal, Apaharan, Loknayak, Dil Dosti, Khoya Khoya Chand, and Raajneeti. Following that, she wrote and directed her debut film Turning 30, which was poorly received by critics and audiences.

Shrivastava then wrote the script for Lipstick Under My Burkha in 2012. She submitted the draft for the screenwriter's lab at National Film Development Corporation of India, where she was mentored by Urmi Juvekar. Upon completion, Lipstick Under My Burkha had its world premiere in October 2016 at the Tokyo International Film Festival, was also screened at the Mumbai Film Festival, and had its North American premiere at the Miami International Film Festival in March 2017.

Lipstick Under My Burkha was initially denied a release in India in January 2017, after the Central Board of Film Certification (CBFC) refused a certificate because of the sexual content and language used in the film. Shrivastavaa and her team appealed this decision to the Film Certification Appellate Tribunal (FCAT). Following a discussion which resulted in a few changes in the original cut, FCAT organisation directed the CBFC to issue an A certificate to the film.

Shrivastava spoke of the changes with Agence-France Presse, saying, "I would have loved no cuts, but the FCAT has been very fair and clear. I feel that we will be able to release the film without hampering the narrative or diluting its essence." Lipstick Under My Burkha was released theatrically in India on 21 July 2017 to positive response from film critics and audiences alike. It was a breakthrough film for Indian cinema on multiple fronts, from its feminist themes to its comedic and progressive take on women's sexuality, religion and other socio-political aspects of Indian society.

After the success of Lipstick Under My Burkha, Shrivastava went on to write and direct Dolly Kitty Aur Woh Chamakte Sitare, a comedy/drama feature starring Konkona Sen Sharma and produced by Balaji Motion Pictures. It premiered at the Busan International Film Festival and was released on Netflix in September 2020.

Making her series debut, Shrivastava worked on the Amazon Prime Video series Made in Heaven, where she directed and co-wrote several episodes for the show's first and second seasons. The show, produced by Excel Entertainment, tackles contemporary themes in India, such as the clash between conservative and progressive mindsets, and the evolving romantic needs of young Indians versus the traditional stronghold of older generations. The show's writing and direction received acclaim. Shrivastava also directed and wrote several episodes in the second season, which released on August 10, 2023.

Shrivastava was the creator, writer, director and showrunner on Bombay Begums, an urban drama series revolving around five Indian women across several generations. The show was produced by Endemol Shine India and Chernin Entertainment and released on Netflix in 2022.

Shrivastava was a writer and director on several episodes of Amazon Prime Video's Modern Love: Mumbai, the Mumbai chapter in the Modern Love anthology series. The romantic comedy show, which was produced by Pritish Nandy and released in May 2022, is based on the American anthology series of the same name, also on Amazon Prime. The anthology focuses on six tales of human connection and different kinds of love, which are unrelated to each other but connected in their universal themes.

== Personal life ==
Shrivastava currently lives and works in Mumbai. In an interview with the Bangalore Mirror, she mentioned that she practices Buddhism. Her father died in 2016 after a prolonged illness.

== Filmography ==
Year	Film	Director	Writer	Producer	Notes
2007	Dil Dosti Etc	No	No	executive	
2007	Khoya Khoya Chand	No	No	executive	
2011	Turning 30	Yes	Yes	No	Directorial debut
2017	Lipstick Under My Burkha	Yes	Yes	No	Nominated—Filmfare Critics Award for Best Film
2019	Made in Heaven	Yes	Yes	No	Amazon Prime Series
2020	Dolly Kitty Aur Woh Chamakte Sitare	Yes	Yes	No	Netflix film
2021	Bombay Begums	Yes	Yes	Yes	Netflix series
2022	Modern Love: Mumbai	Yes	Yes	No	Anthology series on Amazon Prime Video

Assistant director

Year	Film	Role
2005	Apaharan	Chief assistant director
2010	Raajneeti	Associate director
