= Shivam Bhaargava =

Indian actor (born 1986)

- Born: 29 October 1986 (age 40); Lucknow
- Occupation: Actor

Shivam Bhaargava (born 29 October 1986) is an Indian actor who mainly works in Hindi films and web series. He is mostly known for his work in Bombers (2018) Ghost (2019), Tuesdays and Fridays (2021) and Badtameez Dil (2023).

== Early life and education ==
Bhaargava was born on 29 October 1986 in Lucknow. He belongs to a political and business family. He attended Wynberg Allen School in Mussoorie. He completed a Master of Business Administration degree at Birmingham University.

== Career ==
He started his career in 2018 by playing a role in sports drama web series Bombers, featuring Ranvir Shorey and Aahana Kumra. In 2019, he starred in Vikram Bhatt's horror thriller film Ghost, alongside Sanaya Irani. In 2021, he featured in Sanjay Leela Bhansali's Tuesdays and Fridays, which also featured Jhataleka and Zoa Morani in lead roles. In the same year, he appeared in State Of Siege: Temple Attack, starring Akshaye Khanna and Gautam Rode in lead roles. In 2023, he played a lead role in Ekta Kapoor's romantic drama television series Badtameez Dil, featuring Barun Sobti and Riddhi Dogra.

== Filmography ==
Year	Title	Role	Ref.(s)
2019	Ghost	Karan Khanna	
2021	Tuesdays and Fridays	Achal Deoda	
2021	State Of Siege: Temple Attack	Capt. Abrar Khan	

=== Web Series ===
Year	Title	Role	Ref.(s)
2018	Bombers	Ron	
2023	Badtameez Dil	Ari	
2024	Paithani (web series)	Vinay Bhanushali	
