= Awadh Queer Pride =

LGBTQ event in Uttar Pradesh, India

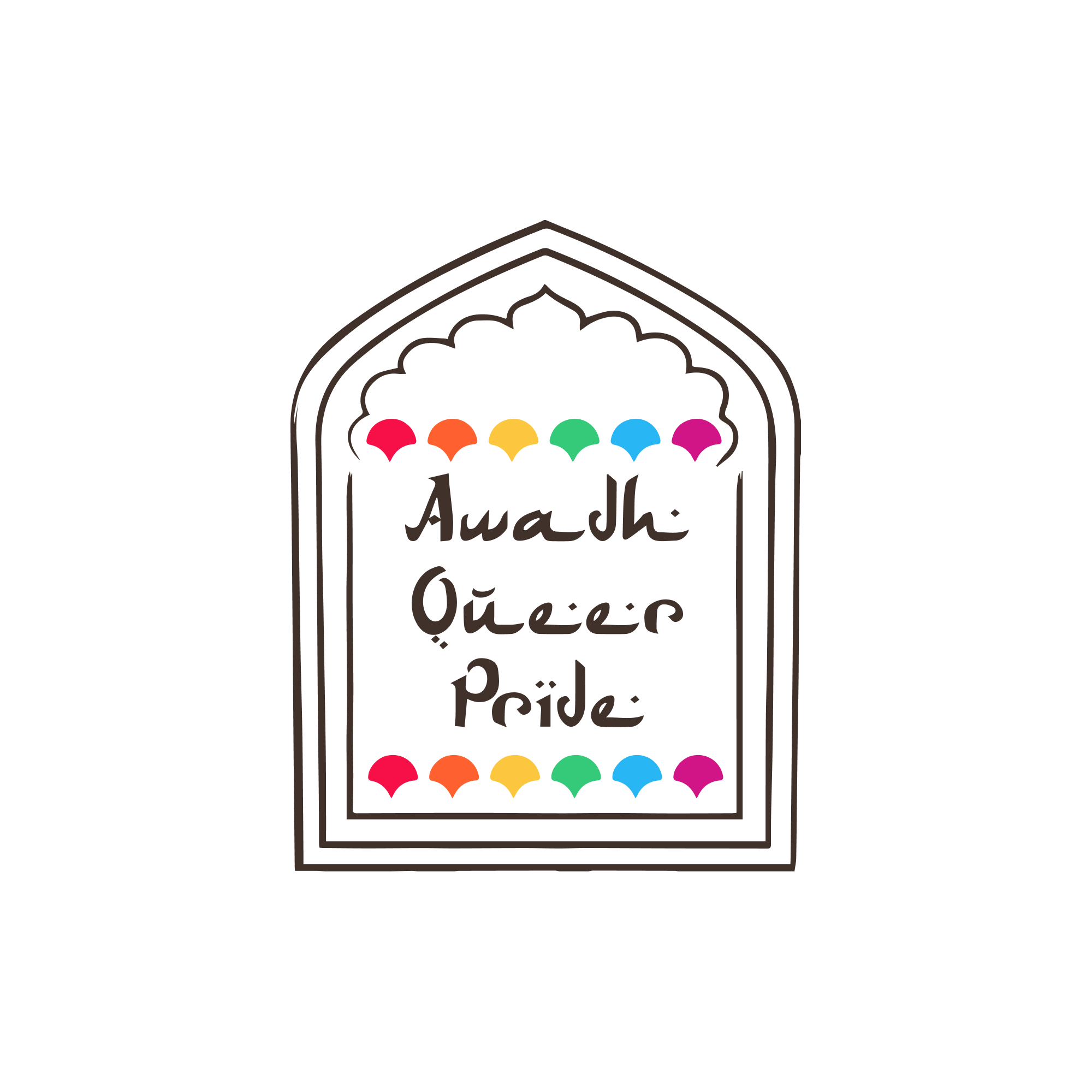

Awadh Queer Pride is an annual event held in Lucknow, India. It was first held on 9 April 2017, and in the years since has also been held in February and March. It is organized by the Awadh Queer Pride Committee (AQPC), which is made up of volunteers.

== History ==
Awadh Queer Pride was inspired by the first Pride Parade in India, Kolkata Pride, on 2 July 1999.

The event began with a pride parade in 2017, which was organized by members of the city's LGBTQIA+ community and led by Darvesh Singh Yadvendra. The parade was attended by approximately 300 people, including heterosexual allies and parents of LGBTQIA+ individuals. The walk started from Sikandar Bagh and continued for 1.5 kilometres (0.93 mi) until terminating at Hazratganj.

Approximately 400 people attended the second Awadh Queer Pride Walk in 2018.

In 2021, actresses Ridhi Dogra and Monica Dogra were invited to the event due to their work on the show The Married Woman.

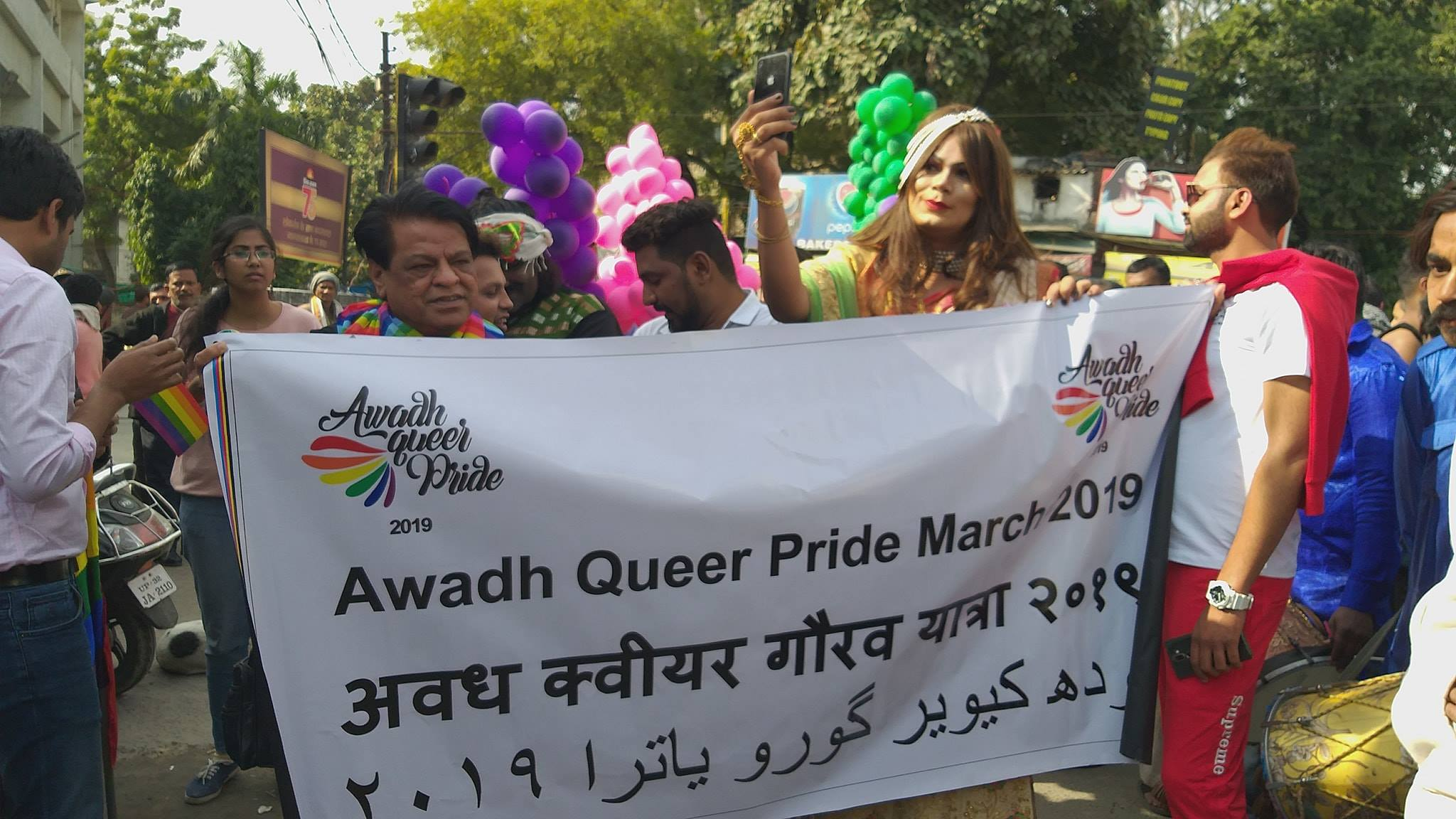
The Awadh Queer Pride March happens annually in Lucknow, Uttar Pradesh, India.
