= Mohsin Khan (Indian actor) =

Indian actor (born 1991)

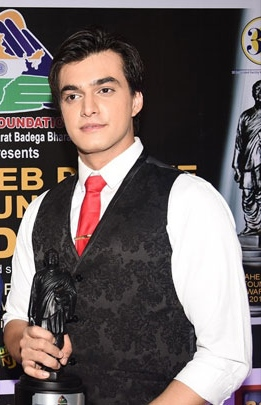
- Khan in 2019
- Pronunciation: [moʱsin kʰɑn]
- Born: Waseem Khan; 26 October 1991 (age 34); Nadiad, Gujarat, India
- Occupation: Actor
- Years active: 2014–present
- Spouse: Tamanna (m. 2026)

Mohsin Khan (Note: Gujarati pronunciation: [moʱsin kʰɑn]; Hindustani pronunciation: [moːɦsɪn xɑːn].) (Gujarati pronunciation: [moʱsin kʰɑn]; born Waseem Khan on 26 October 1991) is an Indian actor known for portraying the role of Kartik Goenka in Star Plus's Yeh Rishta Kya Kehlata Hai.

== Early life ==
Mohsin Khan is a Gujarati Muslim, who was born in Nadiad, Gujarat. Initially, he was named Waseem, but soon, his father changed his name to Mohsin Khan.

He did his schooling from Children's Academy in Mumbai and studied engineering at Thakur Polytechnic, Mumbai, receiving a diploma in Electronics and Telecommunications Engineering, and earned a Bachelor in Management Studies degree from Mithibai College.

== Career ==
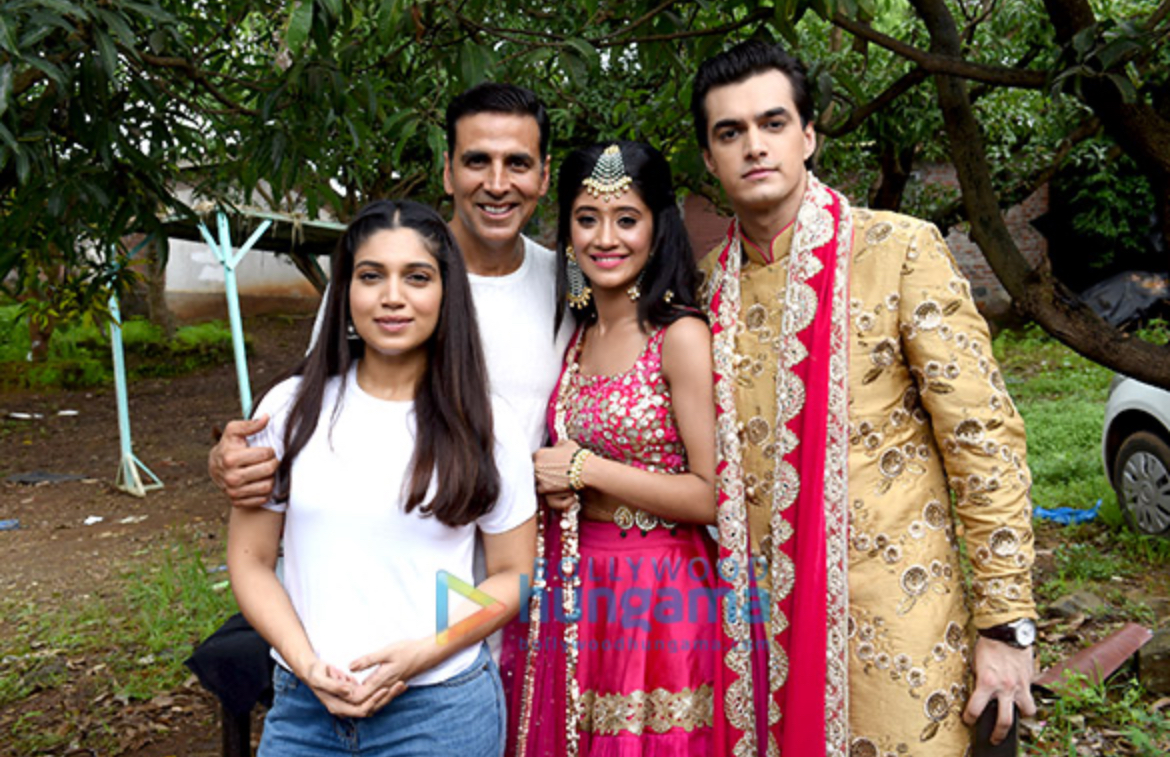
Akshay Kumar and Bhumi Pednekar with Shivangi Joshi and Khan for promotion of Toilet - Ek Prem Katha

Khan started his career as the second assistant director on the film Koyelaanchal. He made his television debut with Star Plus's Nisha Aur Uske Cousins, but rose to fame playing Kartik Goenka in Yeh Rishta Kya Kehlata Hai, opposite Shivangi Joshi.

In October 2023, it was confirmed that Khan is gonna make his OTT debut opposite Eisha Singh as Maddy in web-series Jab Mila Tu for JioCinema.

== Personal life ==
Khan announced his intimate engagement ceremony with Tamanna, his non-industry partner on 22 August 2026 and married her on 3 October 2026.

== Filmography ==
=== Television ===
| Year | Title | Role | Ref. |
|---|---|---|---|
| 2014 | Love by Chance | Jignesh | |
| 2014 | Meri Aashiqui Tum Se Hi | Roumil | |
| 2014 | Nisha Aur Uske Cousins | Ritesh | |
| 2015 | Dream Girl – Ek Ladki Deewani Si | Samar Sareen | |
| 2015 | Pyaar Tune Kya Kiya | Suraj | |
| 2016 | Pyaar Tune Kya Kiya | Girish | |
| 2016–2021 | Yeh Rishta Kya Kehlata Hai | Kartik Goenka | |

==== Special appearances ====
| Year | Title | Role | Ref. |
|---|---|---|---|
| 2019 | Yeh Rishtey Hain Pyaar Ke | Kartik Goenka | |
| 2019 | Nach Baliye 9 | Kartik Goenka | |

=== Web series ===
| Year | Title | Role | Notes | Ref. |
|---|---|---|---|---|
| 2024 | Jab Mila Tu | Maddy | | |

=== Music videos ===
| Year | Title | Singer(s) | Ref. |
|---|---|---|---|
| 2020 | Baarish | Stebin Ben, Payal Dev | |
| 2020 | Woh Chaand Kahan Se Laogi | Vishal Mishra | |
| 2021 | Pyaar Karte Ho Na | Shreya Ghoshal, Stebin Ben | |
| 2021 | Nainon Ka Ye Rona Jaaye Na | Raj Barman | |
| 2022 | Uff | Shreya Ghoshal | |
| 2022 | Tumko Dekha Toh Pyaar Aagaya | Raj Barman | |
| 2022 | Teri Ada | Mohit Chauhan, Saumya Upadhyay | |
| 2022 | Chand Naraz Hai | Abhi Dutt | |
| 2022 | Shonk Se | Afsana Khan | |
| 2022 | Jaa Rahe Ho | Yasser Desai | |
| 2022 | Aashiq Hoon | Raj Barman | |
| 2022 | Dheere Dheere Tumse Pyaar Hogaya | Stebin Ben | |
| 2022 | Ishq Ishq Karke | Stebin Ben | |
| 2022 | Saawan Ki Boondein | Stebin Ben | |
| 2022 | Tu Mujhse Juda | Akhil Sachdeva | |
| 2023 | Kuch Toh Zaroor Hai | Javed Ali | |
| 2023 | Rista Rista | Stebin Ben | |
| 2024 | Dua Kijiye | Sameer Khan | |

== Awards and nominations ==
=== Television awards ===
| Year | Award | Category | Work | Result | Ref. |
|---|---|---|---|---|---|
| 2017 | Gold Awards | Best Debut Male | Yeh Rishta Kya Kehlata Hai | Won | |
| 2017 | Asian Viewers Television Awards | Male Actor of the Year | Yeh Rishta Kya Kehlata Hai | Nominated | |
| 2018 | Gold Awards | Best Onscreen Jodi | Yeh Rishta Kya Kehlata Hai | Won | |
| 2019 | Gold Awards | Best Actor Male Popular | Yeh Rishta Kya Kehlata Hai | Won | |
| 2019 | Asian Viewers Television Awards | Male Actor of the Year | Yeh Rishta Kya Kehlata Hai | Nominated | |
| 2021 | Indian Television Academy Awards | Best Actor Drama Popular | Yeh Rishta Kya Kehlata Hai | Nominated | |
| 2024 | Indian Television Academy Awards | Best Actor OTT | Jab Mila Tu | Nominated | |

=== Others ===
| Year | Award | Category | Result | Ref. |
|---|---|---|---|---|
| 2020 | Gold Glam and Style Awards | Most Photogenic Star Male | Won | |
| 2024 | Pinkvilla Screen and Style Icons Awards | Most Stylish TV Actor Male | Won | |

== See also ==
- List of Indian television actors
