= Vinod Dua =

Indian journalist (1954-2021)

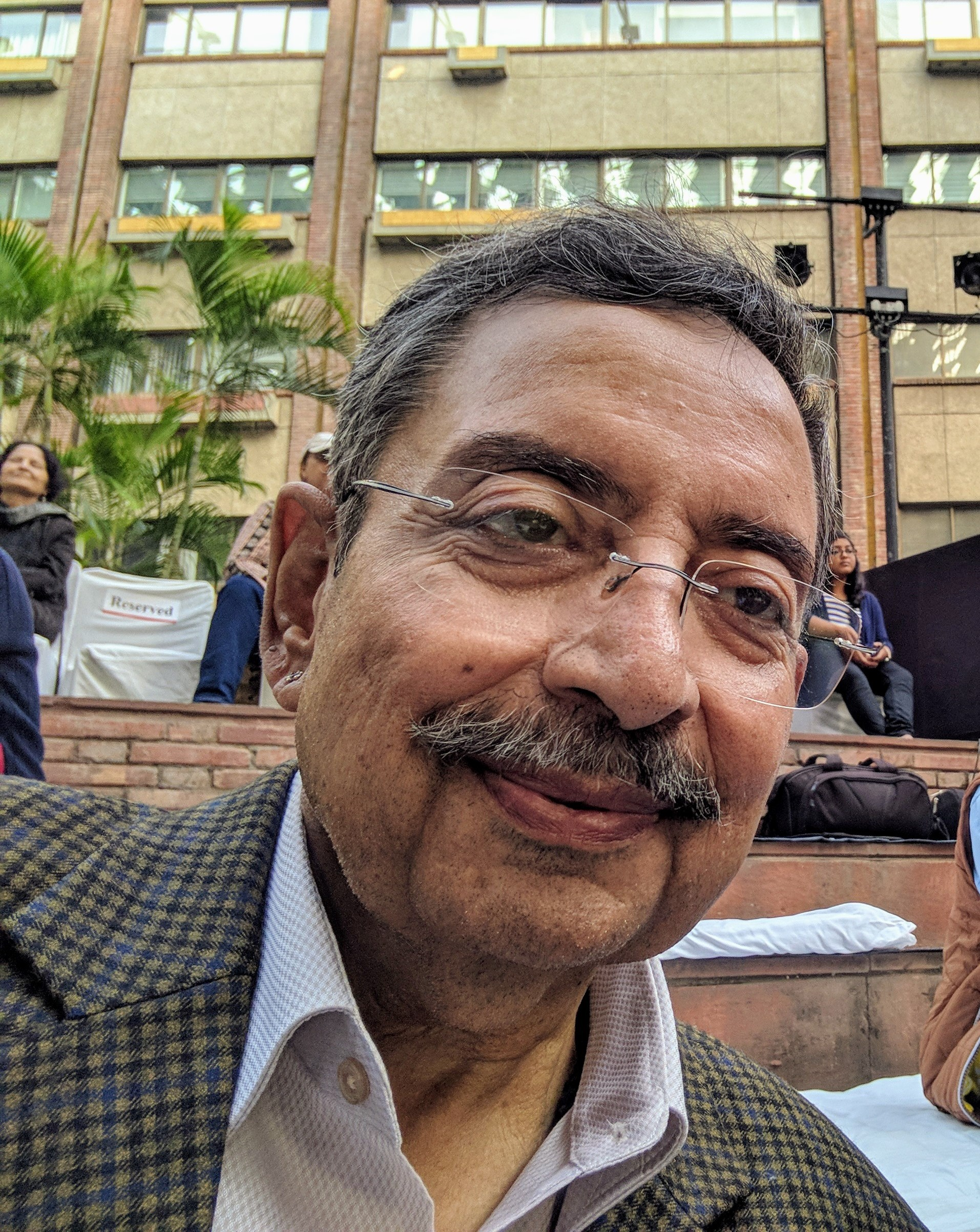
- Dua at a function in Delhi
- Born: 11 March 1954; New Delhi, India
- Died: 4 December 2021 (aged 67); New Delhi, India
- Education: University of Delhi (BA, MA)
- Occupation: Journalist
- Spouse: Padmavati Dua (died 2021)
- Children: 2, including Mallika
- Awards: Ramnath Goenka Excellence in Journalism Award (1996); Padma Shri (2008); Red Ink Award for Journalist of the Year (2017)

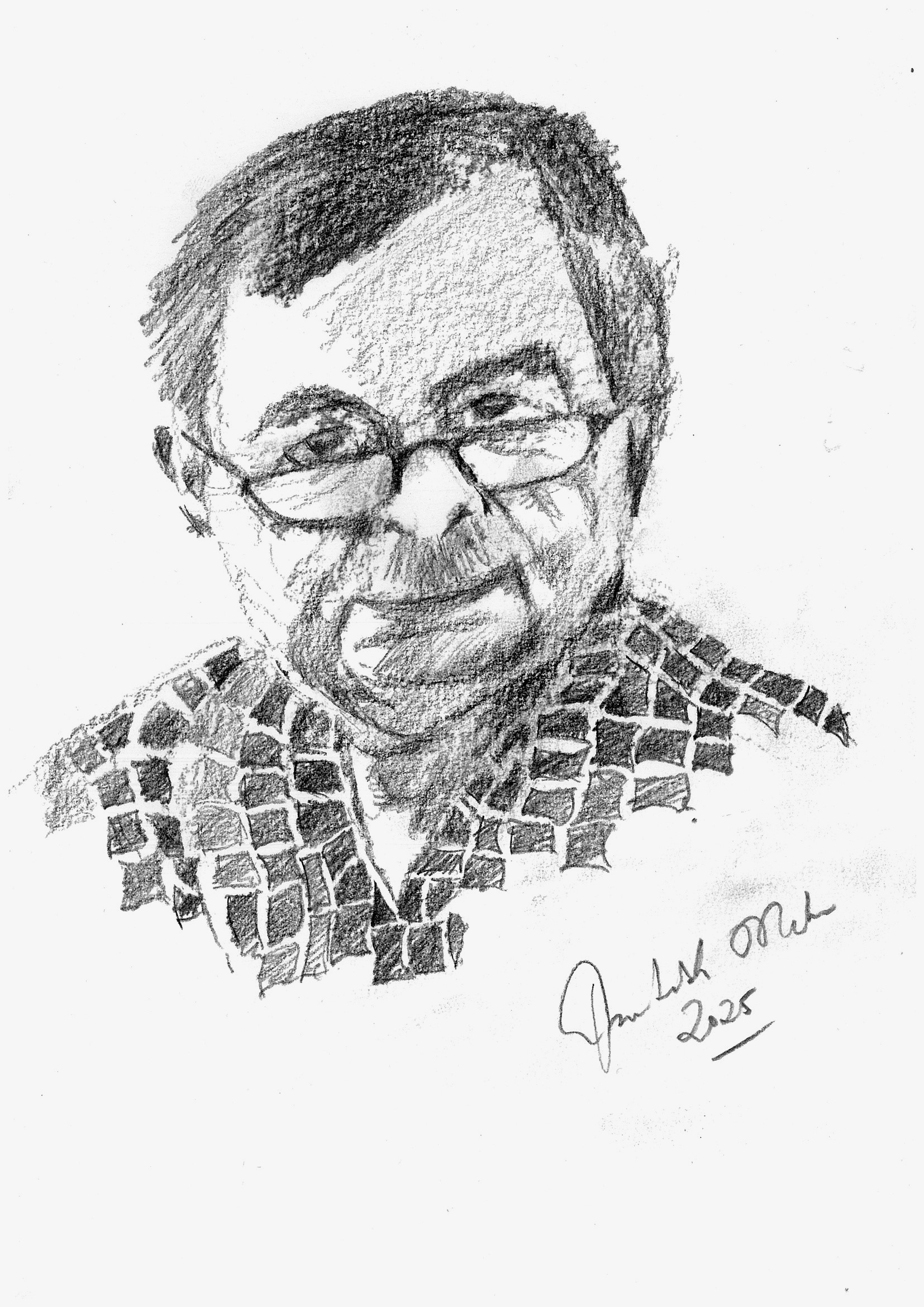
Vinod Dua, Journalist Extraordinaire Charcoal Portrait by Amitabh Mitra

Vinod Dua (11 March 1954 – 4 December 2021) was an Indian journalist who worked in Doordarshan and NDTV India. In 1996, he became the first electronic media journalist to be bestowed with the Ramnath Goenka Excellence in Journalism Award. He was awarded the Padma Shri for Journalism in 2008 by the Government of India. In June 2017, for his lifetime achievement in the field of journalism, Mumbai Press Club awarded him RedInk Award, which was presented to Dua by Devendra Fadnavis, Chief Minister of Maharashtra.

== Early life ==
Vinod Dua's early upbringing was in the refugee colonies of Delhi. His parents were Punjabi Hindus who migrated from Dera Ismail Khan, Khyber Pakhtunkhwa, after the Partition of India in 1947. In his school and college days, Dua participated in a number of singing and debate events, and he also did theatres until the mid-1980s. Sutradhar Puppet of Sri Ram Center for Art and Culture performed two plays that were written by Dua for the children. He was a member of a street theatre group, Theatre Union, which produced plays against the social issues, such as dowry.

He graduated with a degree in English literature from Hans Raj College and obtained his master's degree in literature, both from the University of Delhi. In November 1974, Dua made his first television appearance in Yuva Manch, a Hindi-language youth program which was aired on Doordarshan (formerly called Delhi television). Yuv Jan, a youth show for the youth of Raipur, Muzaffarpur, and Jaipur for Satellite Instructional Television Experiment (SITE), was anchored by Dua in 1975. The same year, he began anchoring Jawan Tarang, a program for youth which was telecast on the newly commissioned Amritsar TV. He continued his job until 1980.

In 1981, he started anchoring Aap Ke Liye, a Sunday morning family magazine, which he kept doing until 1984. Dua, along with Prannoy Roy, co-anchored the election analysis on Doordarshan in 1984. This gave his career a boost, as it bagged him the chance to anchor election analysis program for several other television channels. He also anchored Janvani (People's Voice), a show where common people had got the opportunity to directly question the ministers, in 1985. This show was first of its kind. Dua joined TV Today, a venture of India Today Group, as its chief producer in 1987.

To produce the shows based on current affairs, budget analysis, and documentary films, he launched his production company, The Communication Group, in 1988. Dua anchored the show Chakravyuha, the channel Zee TV, in 1992. Between 1992 and 1996, he was the producer of a weekly current affairs magazine, Parakh, which was telecast on Doordarshan.

In 1996, he became the first electronic media journalist to be bestowed with the esteemed Ramnath Goenka Award for excellence in the field of journalism. Dua was an anchor for the show Tasveer-e-Hind, which was aired on Doordarshan's cerebral channel, DD3 Media. He served as an anchor for the channel between 1997 and 1998. In March 1998, Dua anchored the Sony Entertainment Channel's show, Chunav Chunauti. He was linked to the Sahara TV from the year 2000 to 2003, for which he used to anchor Pratidin. Dua used to host the NDTV India's program, Zaika India Ka, for which he travelled across the cities; stopped by the highways, roads; tasted several dishes from the roadside dhabas. He also anchored Jan Gan Man Ki Baat for The Wire Hindi.

== Controversy ==
In October 2017, Dua expressed his disapproval at actor Akshay Kumar for making sexist remarks against his daughter, Mallika Dua, during the shoot of an episode of the comedy show, The Great Indian Laughter Challenge. Subsequently, in October 2018, film director Nishtha Jain accused Dua of persistent attempts of sexual harassment. Jain was shocked over Dua's stand on sexist remarks about his daughter even as he himself had 'sexually harassed her'. However, Dua refuted the allegation and called it baseless and the figment of someone's imagination. He termed it as a sinister attempt by the right wing ecosystem to malign his image.

A FIR was registered on 5 June 2020, by BJP spokesperson Naveen Kumar from Himachal Pradesh for allegedly "making statements conducing to public mischief". In his complaint to the Crime Branch, Kumar accused Dua of "spreading fake news" through "The Vinod Dua Show" on YouTube. Dua was also accused by Kumar of "misreporting" on the Delhi communal violence and stating that the "central government had done nothing to stop the violence". However, Supreme Court quashed sedition and other charges that were registered against Vinod Dua by Naveen Kumar for making comments critical of Narendra Modi and the Central government.

== Death ==
Dua and his wife contracted COVID-19 in early 2021 and he was hospitalised several times. His wife died from the virus in June and his condition worsened for the rest of the year. He died after developing chronic liver disease which was said to be the result of alcoholism but was attributed to the post-COVID-19 complication on 4 December 2021, in New Delhi at the age of 67.

== Awards ==
- The first electronic media journalist awarded by esteemed Ramnath Goenka Excellence in Journalism Award in 1996.
- Awarded the Padma Shri in 2008.
- In 2016, ITM University, Gwalior awarded him the D. Litt. "Honoris Causa" (an honorary degree in Doctor of Letters).
- In 2017, for his lifetime achievement in the field of journalism, Mumbai Press Club awarded him RedInk Award, which was presented by Devendra Fadnavis, former Chief Minister of Maharashtra.
