= State of Siege: Temple Attack =

2021 action thriller film directed by Ken Ghosh

- Release poster
- Directed by: Ken Ghosh
- Written by: William Borthwick; Simon Fantauzzo
- Based on: Akshardham Temple attack
- Produced by: Abhimanyu Singh
- Starring: Akshaye Khanna; Abhimanyu Singh; Gautam Rode; Vivek Dahiya; Akshay Oberoi; Abhilash Chaudhary; Chandan Roy; Shivam Bhaargava
- Cinematography: Tejal Shetye
- Edited by: Mukesh Thakur
- Music by: Kartik Shah
- Production company: Contiloe Pictures
- Distributed by: ZEE5
- Release date: 9 July 2021
- Running time: 110 minutes
- Country: India
- Language: Hindi

State of Siege: Temple Attack is a 2021 Indian Hindi-language action thriller film directed by Ken Ghosh, starring Akshaye Khanna in the lead role. It was made as a direct-to-video film for ZEE5. It is loosely based on the 2002 Akshardham Temple attack and the subsequent operation to kill the perpetrators. It is a standalone sequel to State of Siege: 26/11.

== Plot ==
In 2001, Major Hanut Singh and his team participate in an operation to rescue a minister's daughter, where his best friend is killed during this mission.

Major Hanut Singh is haunted by his past where he was injured badly in a terrorist attack and lost his colleague when they were close to completing a mission. The state of Gujarat has just calmed due to on going riots but a terrorist organization led by Abu Hamza plans to attack a temple in order to free their leader Bilal Naikoo. The terrorists enter the temple and start cross firing and killing who ever comes on their way but further they get orders from Abu Hamza to hold the civilians as captive and demands the government to free their leader Bilal Naikoo or every hour there will be a blood shed. Major Hanut Singh along with his team of NSG commandos decides to lead the mission but his senior's ask him to back out when he does not follow the orders leading to cross firing between the terrorists and NSG Commandos.

What happens next, do they succeed or fail?

== Cast ==
- Akshaye Khanna as Major Hanut Singh, NSG officer
- Gautam Rode as Major Samar, NSG officer
- Vivek Dahiya as Captain Rohit Bagga, NSG officer
- Akshay Oberoi as Captain Bibek
- Abhilash Chaudhary as Iqbal, Lead Terrorist
- Parvin Dabas as Colonel Nagar, NSG Commanding Officer
- Samir Soni as Gujarat CM Choksi
- Abhimanyu Singh as Abu Hamza
- Mir Sarwar as Bilal Naikoo
- Manjari Fadnis as Saloni
- Chandan Roy as Mohsin
- Shivam Bhaargava as Capt. Abrar Khan
- Ravi Kothari
- Kallirroi Tziafeta as Angela

== Production ==
The film is a next installment to State of Siege: 26/11, a web series about the 2008 Mumbai attacks. The film is loosely based on the terrorist attack at Akshardham Temple in 2002 Akshardham Temple attack in Gandhinagar.

== Reception ==
Archika Khurana of The Times of India gave the film 3.5 out of 5 stars and stated, "After 'State of Siege: 26/11', this 112-minutes combat drama is a fitting tribute to our NSG soldiers. This dramatized retelling may bring up unpleasant memories for some, but it is well worth watching." Arushi Jain of The Indian Express gave the film a mostly positive review and stated, "Led by Akshaye Khanna, this film is for everyone who likes to see a cat-and-mouse chase between ghastly, heavily armed men and brave, 'can do anything for the nation' soldiers." Saibal Chatterjee of NDTV gave the film 2 out of 5 stars and stated, "Akshaye Khanna is doubtless a talented actor. One sees flashes of his class all through the film. But he is trapped in a script that has little room for vivid character development." Soumya Srivastava of Hindustan Times gave the film a mixed review and stated, "The 2002 attack was a gruesome blot on the history of our country. 30 lives were lost. No Bollywood masala film should be allowed to say it was too little, too bland."

Anna MM Vetticad of Firstpost gave the film 1.75 out of 5 stars and stated, "State of Siege: Temple Attack does everything in its power to indicate that it is based on the 2002 Akshardham Temple attack. It then twists itself in knots to distance itself from that real-life story." Prateek Sur of Rediff.com gave the film 2 out of 5 stars and stated, "Akshaye Khanna is the only worthy element about this patriotic actioner." Nandini Ramnath of Scroll gave the film a positive review and stated, "Temple Attack is Khanna's first foray into the digital space. True to form, the maverick actor has chosen a launchpad in which he is one among many but still able to stand out because of sheer star power." Roktim Rajpal of Deccan Herald gave the film 2.5 out of 5 stars and praised the action sequences and Khanna's performance, though criticized the "middling execution" and "half-baked characters".

== Theatrical release ==
The film was released in theatres on 4 July 2025 under the title Akshardham: Operation Vajra Shakti.
