= Badtameez Dil (TV series) =

Indian romantic drama television series (2023)

- Genre: Drama; Romance
- Created by: Ekta Kapoor
- Directed by: Prashant Bhagia
- Starring: Barun Sobti; Riddhi Dogra; Mallika Dua; Minissha Lamba; Shivam Bhaargava
- Theme music composer: Pranaay
- Country of origin: India
- Original language: Hindi
- No. of seasons: 1
- No. of episodes: 10

Production
- Camera setup: Multi-camera
- Running time: 23-33 minutes
- Production company: ALTBalaji

Original release
- Network: Amazon miniTV
- Release: 9 June 2023 – present

Badtameez Dil (transl. The Insolent Heart) is an Indian Hindi-language romantic drama television series created by Ekta Kapoor and directed by Prashant Bhagia. The series features Barun Sobti, Riddhi Dogra, Mallika Dua, Minissha Lamba and Shivam Bhaargava. It was produced under the banner of ALTBalaji and premiered on Amazon miniTV on 9 June 2023.

== Plot ==
Set in Belgrade, the story is about Himmat Kaur Dhillon (Riddhi Dogra) aka Liz and Karan Singh Rathod (Barun Sobti). Liz is a hopeless romantic girl working as a literature teacher in college. Karan is a casanova who has a very different philosophy of love, marriage and sex. He believes that one should marry friends they are comfortable with, and should have sex with someone else that one feels attracted to. The story is about them navigating the cold, messy journey of becoming friends to best friends to strangers to lovers, and growing as individuals over 9 winters.

== Cast ==
- Barun Sobti as Karan Singh Rathod
- Riddhi Dogra as Himmat "Liz" Kaur Dhillon
- Mallika Dua as Elena
- Minissha Lamba as Hausla "Hailey" Kaur Dhillon
- Shivam Bhaargava as Ari
- Suparna Marwah as Babita Kaur
- Keshab Uppal as Abhay
- Elena Tuteja as Karan's Girlfriend
- Shivam Bhargava as Ari
- Naqiyah Hajj as Sheetal
- Ismeet Kohli as Tessa
- Alekh Kapoor as Sameer
- Ghazal Sood as Preeti
- Ruma Mondal as Krish's Mom
- Chirag Mehra as Anish
- Raviza Chauhan as Aditi
- Affy Ali as Hamid
- Ajay Dutta as Krish's Uncle
- Tanay Aul as Krish
- Geeta Modi as Anita Agarwal (Anish's Mother)
- Ishrat Khan as Mrs. Sabharwal
- Kapil Mahajan as Anish's Father
- Pratyul Joshi as Vishal
- Jude as Krish's Father
- Kriti as Abhay's Sidekick
- Harley Go as Anjali
- Anil Samby as Karan's Father
- Meher Acharya as Surekha
- Saniya Nagdev as Anish's Chachi
- Kian Makhwana as Veer
- Indraji as Karan's Grandmother
- Rabban as Young Karan
- Kulpreet Yadav as Sayyed

== Episodes ==
No.	Title	Directed by	Written by	Original release date
1	"Love Like A Poem"	Prashant Bhagia	Ekta Kapoor	June 9, 2023
2	"I Hate Love"	Prashant Bhagia	Ekta Kapoor	June 9, 2023
3	"The Day It All Changed"	Prashant Bhagia	Ekta Kapoor	June 9, 2023
4	"Matchmaker"	Prashant Bhagia	Ekta Kapoor	June 9, 2023
5	"Broken Threads"	Prashant Bhagia	Ekta Kapoor	June 9, 2023
6	"Messy Emotions"	Prashant Bhagia	Ekta Kapoor	June 9, 2023
7	"Cheers To A New Mess!"	Prashant Bhagia	Ekta Kapoor	June 9, 2023
8	"Stuck Like Magna Tiles"	Prashant Bhagia	Ekta Kapoor	June 9, 2023
9	"Reality Bites"	Prashant Bhagia	Ekta Kapoor	June 9, 2023
10	"Some Dreams Come Down!"	Prashant Bhagia	Ekta Kapoor	June 9, 2023

== Production ==
Initially titled A Cold Mess, the series was announced by ALTBalaji for Amazon miniTV consisting of ten episodes. Riddhi Dogra and Barun Sobti were signed as the lead. The trailer of the series was released on 5 June 2023.

== Soundtrack ==
Badtameez Dil

Soundtrack album by Akhil Sachdeva, Ankit Tiwari and Rahul Jain
- Released: 2023
- Genre: Soundtrack
- Length: 11:42
- Language: Hindi
- Label: Zee Music Company
External audio
- Badtameez Dil - Full Album on YouTube

The music for Badtameez Dil is composed by Akhil Sachdeva, Ankit Tiwari and Rahul Jain.

Tracklisting
No.	Title	Lyrics	Music	Singer(s)	Length
1.	"Haareya"	Shabbir Ahmed	Ankit Tiwari	Ankit Tiwari	3:42
2.	"Jaane Bekhabar"	Himank Kalal	Sandman	Rahul Jain, Shubhangi Joshi, Sandeep Patil	3:25
3.	"Ranjhana"	Akhil Sachdeva	Akhil Sachdeva	Akhil Sachdeva	4:35
Total length:					11:42

== Reception ==
Sunidhi Prajapat of OTTPlay rated the series 3.5/5 stars. Dhaval Roy of Times of india rated 3 out of 5 stars. Prateek Sur of Outlook India rated the series 3/5 stars.
