= Paithani (TV series) =

- First look poster
- Genre: Drama
- Written by: Madhavi Wageshwari,Chetan Dange and Gajendra Ahire
- Directed by: Gajendra Ahire
- Starring: Mrinal Kulkarni; Eisha Singh; Shivam Bhaargava; Syed Zafar Ali; Sangeeta Balachandran
- Country of origin: India
- Original language: Hindi

Production
- Producers: Zee Studios; Aarambh Entertainment

Original release
- Network: ZEE5
- Release: 15 November 2024

Paithani is a Hindi drama web series directed by Gajendra Ahire and produced by Zee Studios and Aarambh Entertainment. It follows a mother and daughter as they face challenges while weaving their last Paithani saree. Starring Mrinal Kulkarni, Eisha Singh, Shivam Bhaargava, Syed Zafar Ali, and Sangeeta Balachandran, the trailer was released on 7 November 2024, and the series premiered on ZEE5 on 15 November 2024.

== Plot summary ==
The series revolves around the life of Godavari, a renowned artisan known for her exquisite Paithani sarees. As she approaches retirement, her daughter, Kaveri, embarks on a mission to fulfill her mother's lifelong dream: to weave one last Paithani saree. This journey takes them through a tapestry of emotions, challenges, and the enduring bond between a mother and daughter.

== Cast ==
- Mrinal Kulkarni as Godavari
- Eisha Singh as Kaveri
- Shivam Bhaargava as Vinay Bhanushali
- Syed Zafar Ali as Nana
- Sangeeta Balachandran as Ganga Ajji

== Episodes ==
No.	Title	Directed by	Written by	Original release date
1	"Phir Se Hui Subah Hai"	Gajendra Ahire	Madhavi Wageshwari,Chetan Dange and Gajendra Ahire	15 November 2024
Godavari, an expert weaver, continues to create beautiful Paithani sarees despite her failing eyesight. Her daughter, Kaveri, who is a school teacher, dreams of presenting her mother with the final saree she weaves.
2	"Dhagon Ke Bol"	Gajendra Ahire	Madhavi Wageshwari,Chetan Dange and Gajendra Ahire	15 November 2024
Kaveri secures a loan to fund the Paithani and places an advance order. When the order goes missing, Kaveri's grandmother takes a significant step to recover the money.
3	"Main Paithan Se Hoon"	Gajendra Ahire	Madhavi Wageshwari,Chetan Dange andGajendra Ahire	15 November 2024
Kaveri's quest to retrieve the Paithani order brings her to the vendor responsible for the mix-up. She decides to travel to Mumbai to resolve the issue, with her mother reluctantly giving her blessing.
4	"Sherni Hai Wo Sherni"	Gajendra Ahire	Madhavi Wageshwari,Chetan Dange and Gajendra Ahire	15 November 2024
Kaveri faces numerous challenges in Mumbai, including losing her phone. Her determination, however, helps her recover the phone and get closer to finding the person who placed the order.
5	"Sapne Aur Hunar"	Gajendra Ahire	Madhavi Wageshwari,Chetan Dange and Gajendra Ahire	15 November 2024
Kaveri attempts to contact Vinay Bhanushali, the individual who ordered her mother's Paithani. Meanwhile, back home, Godavari is anxious about her daughter's safety.
6	"Hum Dharohar Manne Wale Log Hai"	Gajendra Ahire	Madhavi Wageshwari,Chetan Dange and Gajendra Ahire	15 November 2024
Kaveri tries to persuade Vinay to return the payment for the Paithani she wanted. At the same time, Godavari is faced with a tough decision when she receives a request for a contemporary design for the saree.
7	"Viraasat"	Gajendra Ahire	Madhavi Wageshwari,Chetan Dange and Gajendra Ahire	15 November 2024
Kaveri is torn when her brother has an accident, and she struggles to raise funds for his treatment. Concurrently, Godavari decides to personally deliver the saree she crafted for Vinay.

== Critical reception ==
Shaheen Irani from OTT Play rated the show 1.5 stars out of 5, describing it as "sweet but extremely slow-paced." She noted that while the show romanticizes Mumbai, this is its primary offering, along with a focus on the intricate craft of Paithani saree making. Irani suggested that viewers could either skip it entirely or opt to watch only the final episode, if they don't mind the over-dramatization.

Tanmayi Savadi of Times Now, on the other hand, gave the series 3 stars out of 5, praising the performances of Mrinal Kulkarni and Eisha Singh, calling the series "warm and delicate."

Smriti Kannan of Fugitives commented on Paithani by stating that it had the potential to be an emotional family drama exploring the deep cultural significance of the saree in Indian society. However, she felt that the show missed this opportunity, calling it "a lost chance."
