= Bombers (TV series) =

Indian web series

- Genre: Drama
- Created by: Vishal Puria
- Written by: Vishal Kapoor
- Directed by: Vishal Furia
- Starring: Ranvir Shorey; Anup Soni; Aahana Kumra; (See full cast below)
- Country of origin: India
- Original language: Hindi
- No. of seasons: 1
- No. of episodes: 10 (list of episodes)

Production
- Cinematography: Vikram Amladi
- Running time: 31–40 minutes
- Production companies: Horseshoe Motion Pictures; Banijay Asia

Original release
- Network: ZEE5
- Release: 22 June 2019

Bombers is a sports drama web series starring Ranvir Shorey, Aahana Kumra, Sapna Pabbi and Varun Mitra in lead roles. The series follows the trials and tribulations of the fictional Chandannagar-based football club Bombers FC - primarily set in West Bengal. The football-based web series was released by ZEE5 on 22 June 2019 as a part of its on-demand content streaming service. Bombers is directed by Vishal Furia and written by Vishal Kapoor.

The series is the digital debut of India national football team captain and the captain of Bengaluru FC, Sunil Chhetri.

== Cast ==
- Ranvir Shorey
- Aahana Kumra as Sanjana
- Sapna Pabbi as Andy
- Varun Mitra as Badol
- Prince Narula as Bali
- Meiyang Chang as Tokai
- Gaurav Sharma as Atul
- Flora Saini as Minister's wife
- Zakir Hussain as Samu Da
- Anup Soni as Manik
- Shivam Patil as Toto
- Madhurima Roy
- Shivam Bhaargava as Ron
- Danish Pandor as Arjun

== Episodes ==
| No. overall | No. in season | Title | Directed by | Written by | Original release date |
|---|---|---|---|---|---|
| 1 | 1 | "The End" | Vishal Puria | Vishal Kapoor | 22 June 2019 |
| 2 | 2 | "Bombers Arik Baar" | Vishal Puria | Vishal Kapoor | 22 June 2019 |
| 3 | 3 | "The Challenge" | Vishal Puria | Vishal Kapoor | 22 June 2019 |
| 4 | 4 | "Challenge Accepted" | Vishal Puria | Vishal Kapoor | 22 June 2019 |
| 5 | 5 | "Into the League" | Vishal Puria | Vishal Kapoor | 22 June 2019 |
| 6 | 6 | "Catastrophe Strikes" | Vishal Puria | Vishal Kapoor | 22 June 2019 |
| 7 | 7 | "Bali vs Badol" | Vishal Puria | Vishal Kapoor | 12 July 2019 |
| 8 | 8 | "Testing Times" | Vishal Puria | Vishal Kapoor | 12 July 2019 |
| 9 | 9 | "Down and Out!" | Vishal Puria | Vishal Kapoor | 14 July 2019 |
| 10 | 10 | "Fort Et Fier" | Vishal Puria | Vishal Kapoor | 14 July 2019 |
