= Obsess (2026 film) =

2026 Indian action thriller film

- Directed by: Peter Wilson
- Written by: Sam Bariah
- Produced by: Jagdish Singh; Peter Wilson
- Starring: Peter Wilson; Eisha Singh
- Cinematography: Sarfaraz Ali Hassan Khan
- Edited by: Peter Wilson
- Music by: Kevin Roy George; Saniv Xulfi
- Production companies: Jagraj Motion Pictures; Peter Wilson Entertainment
- Release date: 29 May 2026
- Running time: 138 minutes
- Country: India
- Language: Hindi

Obsess is a 2026 Indian Hindi-language action thriller film directed by Peter Wilson and produced by Jagdish Singh and Peter Wilson. The film stars Peter Wilson and Eisha Singh in lead roles. It was released on 29 May 2026.

== Plot ==
The film follows Sara, a woman whose ordinary day begins with confidence and a carefree attitude. Her routine takes an unexpected turn when she encounters Peter, a man struggling with severe depression. As circumstances bring the two together, a series of unexpected events disrupt her day and lead her into an emotionally difficult situation.

As the day unfolds, Sara attempts to navigate emotional conflict and uncertainty while trying to maintain control over the circumstances around her. The story explores themes of resilience, empathy, human emotions and personal growth in the face of life's unpredictable challenges.

== Cast ==
- Peter Wilson as Peter
- Eisha Singh as Sara

== Release ==
Obsess was released on 29 May 2026.

== Reception ==
Vinamra Mathur, writing for First Post, praised the pace and experimental audacity of the film.
