= Indoo Ki Jawani =

2020 Indian film by Abir Sengupta

- Theatrical release poster
- Directed by: Abir Sengupta
- Written by: Abir Sengupta
- Produced by: Bhushan Kumar; Divya Khosla Kumar; Krishan Kumar; Nikkhil Advani; Monisha Advani; Madhu Bhojwani; Niranjan Iyengar; Ryan Stephen
- Starring: Kiara Advani; Aditya Seal; Mallika Dua
- Narrated by: Kiara Advani
- Cinematography: A. Vasanth
- Edited by: Ajay Sharma
- Music by: Neel Adhikari
- Production companies: T-Series; Emmay Entertainment; Electric Apples
- Distributed by: AA Films
- Release date: 11 December 2020
- Running time: 115 minutes
- Country: India
- Language: Hindi
- Box office: ₹1.52 crore

Indoo Ki Jawani (transl. Indoo's Youth) is a 2020 Indian Hindi-language comedy film directed by debutante Abir Sengupta and produced by T-Series, Emmay Entertainment, and Electric Apples. Distributed by AA Films, it stars Kiara Advani as a Ghaziabad woman who finds love in dating apps, alongside Aditya Seal and Mallika Dua.

Principal photography of the film began in October 2019. It was initially set for cinema release in June 2020. But the release was postponed due to COVID-19 pandemic. It finally opened theatrically on 11 December 2020 amid the 50% occupancy guideline that was announced keeping in mind the pandemic's continuity.

== Plot ==
Indira Gupta a.k.a. "Indoo" is a girl living in Ghaziabad. She is in a relationship with Satish for the past year, who wants to have sex with her. Indoo always refuses as she thinks they should do it only after marriage. Indoo's best friend is Sonal, a knowledgeable girl. Indoo always consults Sonal and follows her advice whenever she is confused. As Indoo is beautiful, all men living nearby want to have sexual intercourse with her, including those as young as high school students and as old as her father.

Meanwhile, two terrorists from Pakistan are hiding in Ghaziabad after shooting a police officer in the arm. The police issue a wanted order for them on TV channels, and as they do not know the terrorists' faces yet, the only clue given is that they are Pakistani.

Sonal convinces Indoo to have sex with Satish for practice and to find out if he has any sexual problems. Without telling Satish in advance, Indoo visits him the next day to have sex with him for the first time, only to find Satish sleeping with another married woman, Alka. Due to the betrayal, Indoo breaks up with him. Sonal pins the blame for Satish's betrayal on Indoo for refusing to have sex with him and also persuades Indoo to have a one-night stand to practice sex. Following her advice, Indoo finds a partner on a dating app, Dinder, and fixes a date with him in her house while her family is away for a week.

Indoo matches with Samar Khan, a musician from Hyderabad. Indoo is known as India to Samar since Sonal mistyped Indira while making Indoo's profile on Dinder. Though both know where the night will lead them, Indoo feels shy and nervous and keeps calling Sonal for suggestions. Samar orders dinner for them via a mobile app Gomato. Later, Samar's passport accidentally falls on the ground, which reveals him to be a Pakistani. Indoo, who happens to have seen the wanted order on TV, accuses Samar of being one of the Pakistani terrorists, but Samar denies it.

They begin to argue as people from two rival countries. Indoo wants Samar to leave her house but asks him to wait till the coast is clear so that no one sees a man leaving her house. After some twists, the food that Samar ordered arrives. Indoo invites the delivery man into the house to keep an eye on the "terrorist" while using the bathroom. Samar grabs this opportunity to force his way out of her house. Now it's the food delivery man who remains with Indoo in her house. She is forced to wait for a chance to send him on his way while the street is empty.

On his way back, Samar sees a dead body. Upon checking the corpse's ID, he realises that that person was supposed to deliver their food. He concludes that the man in Indoo's house must be a terrorist. As his phone battery is dead, Samar tries to seek help from passers-by and people in a prayer gathering near Indoo's house, but nobody listens to him. He informs the police that a local girl India is in danger and a dead body is lying nearby, but the policemen in deep sleep acknowledge that India is not a girl but a mother figure to its citizens. With no alternatives left to save Indoo, Samar returns to her house and barges - in despite Indoo's refusal.

Samar confronts the terrorist and reveals his deeds, but Indoo still thinks that Samar is the real terrorist and does not believe him. Samar and the terrorist fight; Indoo hits Samar with a stick and renders him unconscious. Meanwhile, the police manage to find a photo of the terrorist and publish it on TV.

Indoo sits on the sofa which leads the remote to switch on the TV. She sees the TV and notices, learning that the "delivery man" is the real Pakistani terrorist and that Samar was trying to save her all along. She hides in the house. Unable to find Indoo, the terrorist points his gun at an unconscious Samar, threatening to shoot him if Indoo does not reveal herself. Indoo is forced to show herself while Samar wakes up at the same time. He snatches the terrorist's gun and fights with him. Ultimately, the police arrive on the scene and shoot the terrorist in this hand.

The movie ends with Indoo and Samar apologising to each other as they lean in for a kiss.

== Cast ==
- Kiara Advani as Indira Gupta a.k.a. "Indoo"
- Aditya Seal as Samar Khan
- Mallika Dua as Sonal Makhija
- Rakesh Bedi as Uncle Prem Singh
- Rajendra Sethi as Uncle Ranjit Kumar
- Rajesh Jais as Mr. Gupta, Indoo's father
- Alka Kaushal as Mrs. Gupta, Indoo's mother
- Raghav Raj Kakker as Satish Rajan, Indoo's ex-boyfriend
- Chittaranjan Tripathy as Uncle Pran Loha
- Harsh Sharma as Bunty Gupta, Indoo's younger brother
- Shivam Kakar as Kartar "Kittu" Sinha, Bunty's friend and his neighbor
- Vaibhav Palhade as Riyan
- Iqbal Khan as Avinash Nigam, A senior policeman in Ghaziabad and the investigating officer of the Pakistani terrorists' case
- Govind Pandey as Constable Omprakash Chautala, Avinash's junior policeman
- Mushtaq Khan as News Anchor
- Prabhat Lahari as Lakhan
- Lokesh Mittal as Aadesh
- Guru Randhawa in "Heelein Toot Gayi" song (special appearance)

== Soundtrack ==
Indoo Ki Jawani

Soundtrack album by Rochak Kohli, Mika Singh and Badshah
- Released: 10 December 2020
- Genre: Feature film soundtrack
- Length: 12:48
- Language: Hindi
- Label: T-Series

Official audio
- Indoo Ki Jawani - Full Album on YouTube

The film's music was composed by Rochak Kohli, Mika Singh and Badshah while lyrics written by Shabbir Ahmed, Gurpreet Saini, Gautam G Sharma, and Badshah.

The song "Hasina Pagal Deewani" is from an original track of the same title from the same album "Saawan Mein Lag Gayee Aag" by Mika Singh, composed and written by Mika Singh. This is the second time the song is being recreated after 2008's film Woodstock Villa which was the same-titled sung by Mika Singh. Later the song was recreated again by Payal Dev for 2020's film Ginny Weds Sunny which was also the same title, sung by Mika Singh, Neha Kakkar and Badshah.

Track listing
No.	Title	Lyrics	Music	Singer(s)	Length
1.	"Hasina Pagal Deewani"	Shabbir Ahmed	Mika Singh	Mika Singh, Asees Kaur	3:08
2.	"Heelein Toot Gayi"	Badshah	Badshah	Badshah, Aastha Gill	2:50
3.	"Dil Tera"	Gurpreet Saini, Gautam G Sharma	Rochak Kohli	Benny Dayal, Neeti Mohan	3:42
4.	"Single Ladies"	Gurpreet Saini, Gautam G Sharma	Rochak Kohli	Rochak Kohli, Sukh-E, Jonita Gandhi	3:08
Total length:					12:48
