= Divya Seth =

Indian actress

Divya Seth Shah
- Occupation: Actress
- Years active: 1984 – present
- Mother: Sushma Seth

Divya Seth Shah is an Indian film and television actress, who started her career with TV serial Hum Log, playing Majhli. She is the daughter of actress Sushma Seth and Dhruv Seth.

She had done theatre with Barry John in Delhi, television shows and films like Jab We Met. Divya Seth's husband is Siddharth Shah, a businessman and media professional. The couple got married in 1999. On 5 August 2024, her 23-year-old daughter, Mihika Shah, died following a brief period of illness.

== Career ==
Divya Seth was seen in the web series, The Married Woman, directed by Sahir Raza.

== Filmography ==
=== Films ===
Year	Title	Role	Notes
2007	Jab We Met	Aditya's mother	
2012	English Vinglish	Neelam	
2015	Dil Dhadakne Do	Saira Hashmi	
2015	Hunterrr	Airport Lady	
2017	Patel Ki Punjabi Shaadi	Vir Das's mother	
2018	Sir	Ashwin's mother	
2019	The Accidental Prime Minister	Gursharan Kaur	
2021	Sardar Ka Grandson	Sardar's younger daughter-in-law	
2024	Article 370	CM of J&K Parveena Andrabi	

=== Television ===
Year	Show	Role	Notes
1984	Hum Log	Majhli	
1988	Dil Dariya		
1993	Dekh Bhai Dekh	Priya	
1994	Tehkikaat	Rashmi	Episode 4 & 5
1994–1998	Daraar	Lola	
1995	Banegi Apni Baat	Nikita	
2000	Abhimaan		
2005–2006	Sarkarr:Rishton Ki Ankahi Kahani	Priyamvada Veer Pratapsingh	
2015	Ek Nayi Ummeed - Roshni	Dr. Vasundhara Singh	

=== Web series ===
Year	Title	Role	Platform	Notes
2019	Fittrat	Janki Sareen	ALTBalaji and ZEE5	
2020	Sandwiched Forever	Daya Shastry	SonyLIV	
2021	The Married Woman	Peeplika's Mother	ZEE5	
2021	City of Dreams	Vibha	Hotstar	
2022	Duranga	Anupriya Patel	ZEE5	
