= Mallika Dua =

Indian actress

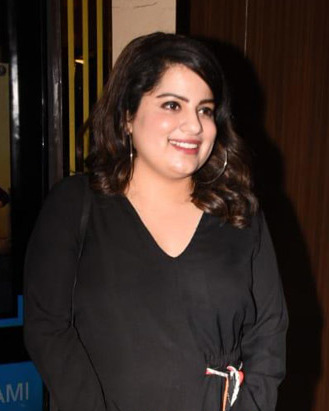
- Dua in 2019
- Born: 18 July 1989 (age 37); Delhi, India
- Education: Franklin and Marshall College
- Occupations: Comedian; Actress; Writer
- Years active: 2016–present
- Parents: Vinod Dua (father); Padmavati Dua (mother)

Mallika Dua (born 18 July 1989) is an Indian comedian, actress and writer. Dua shot to fame with the viral video "Shit People Say: Sarojini Nagar Edition", which was written, styled and enacted by Dua herself. She is the daughter of Padma Shri recipient Indian journalist Vinod Dua.

== Early life ==
Dua was schooled at the Modern School, Barakhamba Road, New Delhi. She is half-Saraiki and half-Tamil. The inspiration for her short videos on social media are from Delhi. She was a theater major from Franklin and Marshall College in the US. Her advertising career started as a trainee at McCain Erickson and later at Contract Advertising. She said that studying was never her cup of tea. She has always been funny and notorious since childhood.

She was exposed to media early since her father, Vinod Dua, is a veteran journalist and a consulting editor at The Wire. Her father insisted that she and her sister should train in classical music and she started her music lessons when she was four, but never imagined music as her career. When she lost her father, Vinod Dua, she penned a note where she mentioned that people said "nazar lag gayi hai logon ki (people have cast evil eye on you)". She also said that she felt empty, but turning to humor gave a voice to her emptiness.

== Career ==
From August 2016, Dua moved to Mumbai formally to be a full-time entertainer, where she got signed by Only Much Louder. She launched her own YouTube channel in 2017 and had been frequently collaborating with All India Bakchod before the channel got itself in trouble around October 2018 in the Indian #MeToo allegations.

Mallika has appeared in the first episode of Girliyapa with comedian Amukurajah, "Why Should Hot Girls Have All the Fun?" and in the Bindass web series The Trip. She also made a special appearance in Saket Chaudhary's Hindi Medium sharing screen space with Irrfan Khan in 2017. In September 2017, she appeared as one of the three mentors along with Zakir Khan and Hussain Dalal for the fifth season of The Great Indian Laughter Challenge which was judged by the actor Akshay Kumar.

In 2018, she appeared in Namaste England (2018) as Harpreet. She reprised her role in the second season of the web series The Trip. She also appeared in Zero (2018) alongside Shah Rukh Khan in the same year. In 2020, she appeared alongside Kiara Advani in the film Indoo Ki Jawani.

== Activism ==
Dua's videos are satirical in nature depicting the harsh reality of the society with a dash of humour. She strongly believes in the cause of feminism and uses her social networking platforms as a tool for women's empowerment and for also expressing her liberal ideologies and open-minded opinions on social causes and issues concerning women. She has actively voiced her opinion against sexual harassment of women at workplace, casual sexism among others. She was also one of the pioneers of the social media movement Me Too where she was one of the first known faces to recount her own experience of being sexually harassed as a child to encourage her fan following (both men and women) to share their experiences as well and to stand up for the cause. She has also defied gender stereotypes through her videos and hashtag activism slamming body-shaming, and fat-shaming, carving a niche for herself in the industry inspiring the youth.

== Filmography ==
=== Films ===
Year	Film	Role
2017	Hindi Medium	Dolly
2018	Namaste England	Harpreet
2018	Zero	NSAR volunteer applicant
2020	Indoo Ki Jawani	Sonal

=== Web series ===
Year	Show	Platform	Ref
2016-2018	The Trip	Bindass	
2016-2017	Various AIB videos	YouTube	
2017	The Great Indian Laughter Challenge	StarPlus	
2018	Midnight Misadventures with Mallika Dua	TLC	
2019	The Office	Hotstar	
2020	Myntra Fashion Superstar	Myntra	
2020	Fake Or Not	Flipkart	
2021	LOL: Hasse Toh Phasse	Amazon Prime Video	
2021	Comedy Premium League	Netflix	
2023	Badtameez Dil	Amazon miniTV	
