= Ghost (2019 film) =

2019 film by Vikram Bhatt

- Theatrical release poster
- Directed by: Vikram Bhatt
- Written by: Story & Screenplay: Vikram Bhatt; Dialogues: Vikram Bhatt; Srivinay Salian
- Produced by: Vashu Bhagnani; Vikram Bhatt
- Starring: Gayathiri Iyer; Sanaya Irani; Shivam Bhaargava
- Cinematography: Prakash Kutty
- Edited by: Kuldip Mehan
- Music by: Songs; Nayeem –Shabir; Sanjeev–Darshan; Arko Pravo Mukherjee; Sonal Pradhan; Vinay Ram Tiwari; Score: Sangeet; Siddharth Haldipur
- Production companies: Pooja Entertainment; Vashu Bhagnani Production
- Distributed by: Pen Marudhar Cine Entertainment
- Release date: 18 October 2019
- Running time: 130 minutes
- Country: India
- Language: Hindi
- Box office: est. ₹1.82 crore

Ghost is a 2019 Indian horror thriller film written and directed by Vikram Bhatt and produced by Vashu Bhagnani Production. The film bankrolled by Loneranger Productions, features Sanaya Irani and Shivam Bhaargava in the lead roles. The story of the film follows Karan Khanna (played by Bhaargava), a politician of Indian origin in the United Kingdom, who is accused of killing his wife. He tells his lawyer that a spirit committed the murder and should be tried. Principal photography commenced in November 2018 in London. It was released on 18 October 2019.

== Plot ==
The film starts with a girl named Barkha Khanna, supposedly killed by a vengeful ghost in her room which is later noticed by her husband, Karan Khanna, a political figure from England. The Metropolitan Police force subsequently arrest him, accusing him of murdering his wife.

Meanwhile, Simran, a lawyer having her own stress-related issues and with a dependency on morphine, is going through an emotional time as her father recently died and her boyfriend (a judge) too broke up with her. Simran, after the insistence of Karan's campaign manager, Bob, reluctantly agrees to take on the case. After getting him out on bail, she learns that Karan and Barkha were not a happy couple and Karan, on Valentine's Day, saw someone sending a locket to Barkha. Karan suspected that his wife is having an affair and himself started an affair as a result. However, his wife was killed one night, and CCTV footage shows Karan entering his apartment at 2 am and leaving at 4 am (which is the time of death of his wife) and again entering the apartment at 6 am and all the evidence is pointing against him.

However, Karan claims that he spent that night at Bob's apartment as he was not able to drive. Meanwhile, Bob notices something and departs for a mental institute in Leeds. He calls Karan, telling him that he knows whose spirit is doing all these but before he could tell who is behind all these, Bob himself is killed by that ghost who had previously killed Barkha. After more investigation, Simran found that Karan was with a girl on the night his wife died but that girl was missing in the police report. After consulting a demonologist, it was revealed that that girl was possessed and Karan was also possessed, and being under possession he actually killed Barkha and that's why he didn't remember that night very much. Further, it was revealed that Barkha was in a lesbian relationship with a girl but instead married Karan for fame and money. When that girl blackmailed Barkha to tell the truth or bear the consequences, she was taken to the mental institute. There she met Simran's father, a doctor. That girl committed suicide so that she can take revenge on those three after becoming a ghost. She gave a locket to Simran's father and told him to deliver it to Barkha after her death. It was also revealed that the locket contained all her power. Later the missing girl was found dead and the blame fell upon Karan. Simran, with the help of her ex-boyfriend, conducted an exorcism during which the ghost took control over Karan. Simran broke the locket in the nick of time. Thus, Karan got saved and finally proved his innocence. Karan and Simran confess their love for each other. Later Karan gave a party in his house after winning the election, and a cellmate of the deceased girl gave him a box. Unknown to Karan, it had the broken locket inside, indicating that the curse is not over yet.

== Cast ==
- Sanaya Irani as Simran Singh (Defence Lawyer)
- Shivam Bhaargava as Karan Khanna
- Hazel Crowney as Neena (psychic)
- Gayathiri Iyer as Barkha Khanna (Karan's wife)
- Vikram Bhatt as Dr. Singh, Simran's father
- Caroline Wilde as Rachel
- Rabia Maddah as Mel
- Ameet Channa as Bob
- Gary Heron as Judge Francis D'Zouza

== Production ==
The film is based on a newspaper article in which the British Court had allowed a matter involving spirits to be tried. The principal photography of the film started on 17 November 2018 in London.

== Reception ==
The movie opened to negative reviews from critics and the audience alike.

Aarty Iyengar of Latestly gave the film 2.5 stars out of 5, stating, "Sanaya Irani and Shivam Bhargavaa's performance is so terrible that you'd rather watch the ghosts on the big screen over them. Even in the most dangerous and scary situations, Bhargavaa has a faint smile on his face. Sanaya, on the other hand, is terrible in terms of dialogue delivery. Whenever she tries to enunciate or be very articulate, it only sounds like she's trying too hard."

Pallabi Dey Purkayastha of The Times of India gave the film two out of five, writing, "In the end, ‘Ghost’ offers nothing new, not in terms of storytelling nor in evoking a fear with the usual thrills and spills. This one's another shot in the dark in what has become one of the most underutilised genres in Bollywood right now." Namrata Thakker of Rediff.com gave the film one out of five, writing, "The film drags on until the climax, by which time you feel like walking out of the theatre."

Ghost performed poorly at the box office with a collection of ₹1.82 crore and was considered a box-office bomb.

== Soundtrack ==
Ghost

Soundtrack album by Nayeem –Shabir, Sanjeev–Darshan, Arko Pravo Mukherjee, Sonal Pradhan and Vinay Ram Tiwari
- Released: 30 September 2019
- Recorded: 2019
- Studio: Aditya Dev Studio
- Genre: Feature film soundtrack
- Length: 33:14
- Label: Zee Music Company

This music of the film is composed by Nayeem –Shabir, Sanjeev–Darshan, Arko Pravo Mukherjee, Sonal Pradhan and Vinay Ram Tiwari with lyrics written by Shakeel Azmi, Sanjeev-Ajay, Arko Pravo Mukherjee, Sonal Pradhan and Rashmi Virag.

Track listing
No.	Title	Lyrics	Music	Singer(s)	Length
1.	"Dil Maang Raha Hai"	Sanjeev-Ajay	Sanjeev–Darshan	Yasser Desai	3:13
2.	"Jaltey Bujhtey" (Female)	Arko	Arko Pravo Mukherjee	Akanksha Sharma	3:17
3.	"Rooh Ka Rishta"	Sonal Pradhan	Sonal Pradhan	Arko	4:36
4.	"Ye Jo Ho Raha Hai"	Rashmi Virag	Vinay Ram Tiwari	Jyotica Tangri	5:16
5.	"Janmo Janam"	Shakeel Azmi	Nayeem - Shabir	Yasser Desai	5:37
6.	"Mujhe Ishq Sikha Karke"	Sanjeev-Ajay	Sanjeev–Darshan	Jyotica Tangri	2:41
7.	"Jaltey Bujhtey" (Duet)	Arko	Arko	Arko, Aakanksha Sharma	3:53
8.	"Rooh Ka Rishta"	Sonal Pradhan	Sonal Pradhan	Yasser Desai	4:41
Total length:					33:14
