= Jab Mila Tu =

- Release poster
- Genre: Drama
- Created by: Nisheeth N Neelkanth; Harjeet Chhabra
- Written by: Harneet Singh
- Directed by: Lalit Mohan
- Starring: Mohsin Khan; Eisha Singh; Pratik Sehajpal; Alisha Chopra
- Music by: Sarthak Nakul
- Country of origin: India
- Original language: Hindi
- No. of episodes: 24

Production
- Producers: Diksha Argal Neelkanth; Harjeet Chhabra
- Cinematography: Raju Gauli
- Editor: Anurag Singh
- Camera setup: Multi-camera
- Running time: 22-33 minutes
- Production company: A Two Nice Men Mediaworks Production

Original release
- Network: JioCinema
- Release: 22 January – 26 February 2024

Jab Mila Tu (transl. When I Met You) is an Indian Hindi-language drama television series directed by Lalit Mohan and written by Harneet Singh. Produced under A Two Nice Men Mediaworks Production, it stars Mohsin Khan, Eisha Singh, Pratik Sehajpal and Alisha Chopra. The series aired on JioCinema from 22 January 2024 to 26 February 2024.

== Cast ==
- Mohsin Khan as Maddy
- Eisha Singh as Aneri
- Pratik Sehajpal as Jigar
- Alisha Chopra as Mint

== Production ==
The series was announced on JioCinema. Principal photography of the series wrapped in December 2023. The teaser of the series was released on 9 January 2024. Subsequently, the official trailer was released on 16 January 2024.

== Music ==
Jab Mila Tu

Soundtrack album
- Released: February 22, 2024
- Genre: Soundtrack
- Length: 13:47
- Language: Hindi
- Label: Viacom18 Media Pvt. Ltd.

Track listing
No.	Title	Singer(s)	Length
1.	"Afeem Varga"	Aryam, Sarthak Nakul	2:43
2.	"Jab Mila Tu"	Sarthak Nakul, Aryam	3:23
3.	"Jab Mila Tu (Friendship Version)"	Ananya V Asavary	2:12
4.	"Pehli Prem Kahaani (Mother’s Version)"	Akansha Tripathi	1:20
5.	"Pehli Prem Kahaani (Maddy’s Version)"	Aryam	1:31
6.	"Aa Doob Jaa"	Sarthak Nakul, Aryam	2:38
Total length:			13:47

== Reception ==
A critic writing for Times Now gave the series 2 1/2 out of 5 stars. Arpita Mondal of Midgard Times awarded the series six-and-a-half out of ten stars. Aakash Kumar of Filmibeat said "Pratik Sehajpal Steals Hearts As Jigar In His New Show."
