= Rahul Jain (singer) =

Indian singer, music composer, and lyricist

Rahul Jain is an Indian singer, music composer, and lyricist. He debuted in Bollywood with his song "Teri Yaad" in the 2016 Hindi film Fever. He has composed over 250 musical tracks. He was nominated for the Mirchi Music Award for Upcoming Male Vocalist of The Year at the 11th Mirchi Music Awards for the song "Aanewale Kal" from the 2018 Hindi film 1921.

== Early life ==
Jain studied civil engineering. He started his music career in MTV Asia's reality show 'MTV Aloft Star' in 2014.

== Career ==
Jain is well-known for his live performances in college fests around the world. He has a large youth fanbase.

== Works ==
=== Films ===
| Denotes films that have not yet been released |

| Year | Film | Song | Notes | Ref. |
|---|---|---|---|---|
| 2016 | Fever | "Teri Yaad" | | |
| 2018 | 1921 | Aane Wale Kal | | |
| 2018 | Spotlight | Ghar Se Nikla, Na Tum Rhe Tum and Chal Diya Tumse Door | | |
| 2018 | Maaya 2 | | | |
| 2019 | Jhootha Kahin Ka | Jhootha Kahin Ka | as music composer | |
| 2019 | Chhoriyan Chhoron Se Kam Nahi Hoti | | Composed and sang | |
| 2019 | Endcounter | Main To Jee Rha and Kal Tu Na Tha | Composed and sang | |
| 2021 | Kaagaz | "Jug Jug Jiyo" | Composed and sang | |

=== Singles ===
| Year | Song | Ref |
|---|---|---|
| 2019 | "Dim Dim Light" | |
| 2020 | "Badnaam" | |
| 2020 | "Mehram" | |
| 2020 | "Keh Na Saku" | |
| 2020 | "Meri Maa" | |
| 2020 | "Wajah" | |
| 2020 | "Aawazein" | |
| 2020 | "Tenu Meri Umar Lag Jaave" | |
| 2020 | ''Char Dino Ka Pyaar" unplugged/freestyle (ItsIncubius) | |
| 2020 | "Ek Dua" | |

=== Television ===
| Year | Television | Song | Notes | Ref. |
|---|---|---|---|---|
| 2017 | Tu Ashiqui | "Tu Ashiqui" (Title Track) | Composer, Singer and Lyricist | |
| 2017 | Tu Ashiqui | "Tu Aashiqui" (Romantic Version) | Composer, Singer and Lyricist | |
| 2017 | Tu Ashiqui | "Har Dafa" | Composer, Singer and Lyricist | |
| 2017 | Tu Ashiqui | "Tu Wafa" | Composer, Singer and Lyricist | |
| 2017 | Tu Ashiqui | "Khushi" | Composer, Singer and Lyricist | |
| 2017 | Tu Ashiqui | "Is Qadar Pyar Hai Tumse" | Composer, Singer and Lyricist | |
| 2018 | Yeh Pyaar Nahi Toh Kya Hai | "Yeh Pyar Nahi To Kya Hai" (Title Track) | Music Composer and Singer | |
| 2018 | Mariam Khan - Reporting Live | "Jaanu Na" | Singer | |
| 2019 | Bepannah | "Bepannah" (Title Track) | Music Composer, Singer and Lyrics | |
| 2019 | Bepannah | "Zaroorat" | Music Composer, Singer and Lyrics | |
| 2019 | Gathbandhan | "Bhidne Lage Naina" | Music Composer and Singer | |
| 2019 | Internet Wala Love | "Internet Wala Love" (Title Track) | Music Composer and Singer | |
| 2019 | Beyhadh 2 | "Beyhadh" (Title Track) | Music Composer and Singer | |
| 2021 | Sirf Tum | "Sirf Tum" (Title Track) | Music Composer and Singer | |
| 2021 | Sirf Tum | "Sirf Tum" (Sad Version) | Music Composer and Singer | |
| 2022 | Muskurane Ki Vajah Tum Ho | "Muskurane Ki Vajah Tum Ho" (Title Track) | Music Composer and Singer | |
| 2022 | Ishq Ki Dastaan - Naagmani | "Janam Pe Janam" | Singer | |
| 2023 | Beti Hamari Anmol | "Beti Hamari Anmol" | Singer | |
| 2025 | Lakshmi Niwas | "Priyatama" | Composer | |

=== Web series ===
| Year | Title | Song | Notes | Ref. |
|---|---|---|---|---|
| 2023 | Badtameez Dil | Jaane Bekhabar | Singer | |

== Awards and nominations ==
| Year | Song | Award | Category | Result | Ref. |
|---|---|---|---|---|---|
| 2018 | Aane Wale Kal | Mirchi Music Awards | Mirchi Music Award for Upcoming Male Vocalist of The Year | Nominated | |
