= Happy Birthday (2021 film) =

Indian thriller short film

Happy Birthday is a 2021 Indian thriller short film directed by Prasad Kadam with Anupam Kher and Aahana Kumra playing the lead roles and produced by FNP media.

== Plot ==
68 years old Parsi man, Ratanshi Oshidaar (Rattoo), lives alone in his old but massive house and leads a simple life. But he has a unique profession – he is an automatic writer and healer; someone who communicates with the spirit world. 37 year old Beth Rose, a Christian single mother, who has recently lost her son to Cancer, ends up reaching out to Rattoo as the last possible way to reach out to her son. In spite of having her doubts about the process, and even though something about Rattoo seems a bit odd – he is wearing a weird wig to start with – Beth decides to stay to get one specific answer. "Does her son hate her for killing him?" Rattoo connects with the spirit of her son, and the answers shake her up, she wishes to leave, but Rattoo keeps stalling her. We soon see that Rattoo is preparing for a birthday party, and wishes for Beth to stay longer. He keeps finding reasons to make her wait a little bit longer. It almost seems he cares. They decorate the house together, they blow red balloons together, have deep meaningful conversations about death, Rattoo reveals about how his wife left him taking his daughter along with her, Beth breaks down confessing that she simply got tired taking care of her son for 10 long years. Rattoo changes the mood as soon it's party time!! But Beth is not the only one with secrets. Rattoo's secrets are bone chilling. And this birthday party is a party no one would want to be invited to - it's a trap. "Happy Birthday" is psychological thriller that changes the perception of holding on to and letting go.

== Cast ==
- Anupam Kher
- Aahana Kumra

== Awards and nominations ==
- Filmfare short film awards 2022; Best short film
- New york city international film festival 2022; Best actor
