= Sikhism and homosexuality =

Religious views of sexuality

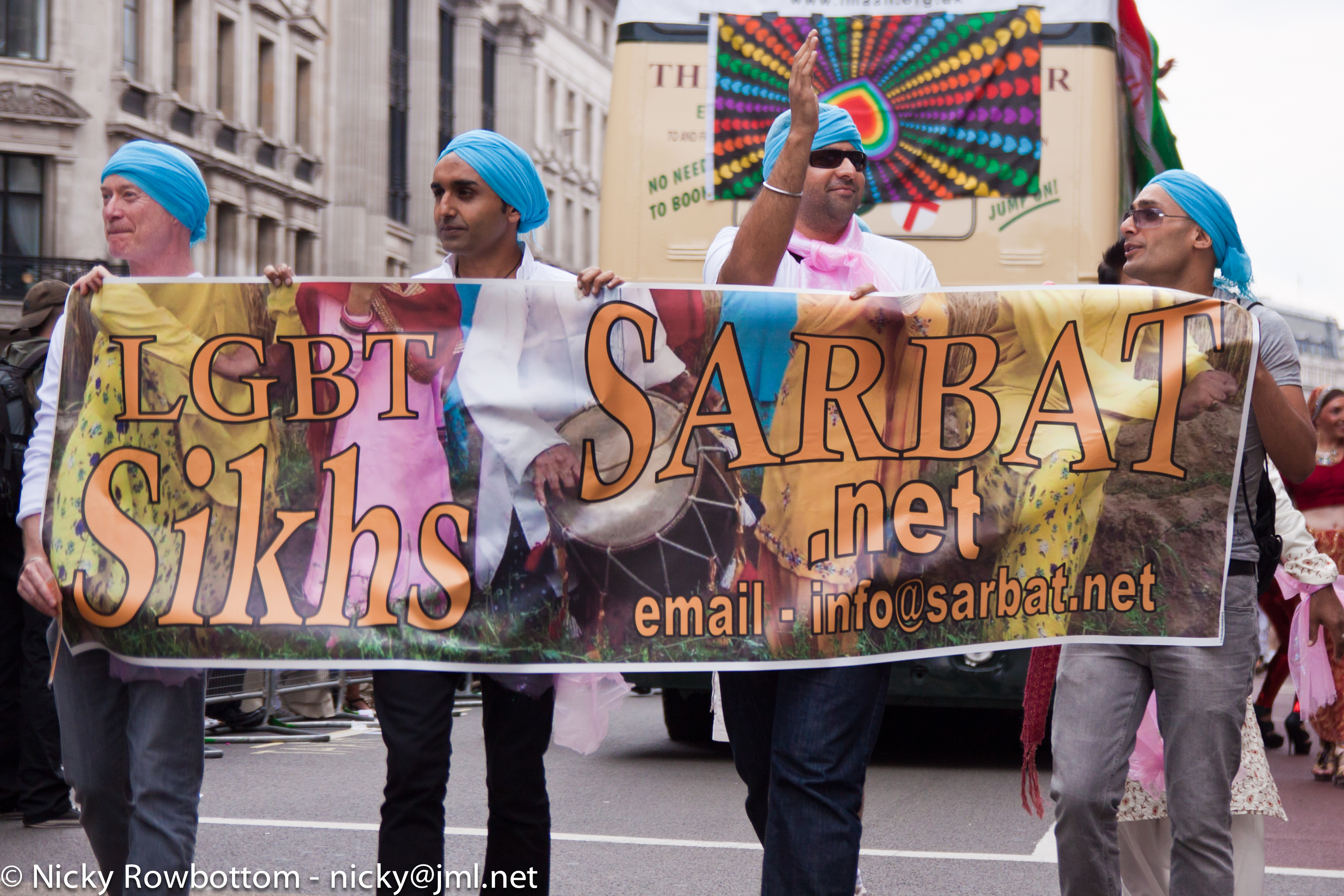
LGBT Sikhs at London gay pride

Sikhism has no specific teachings about homosexuality and the Sikh holy scripture, the Guru Granth Sahib, does not explicitly mention heterosexuality, homosexuality or bisexuality. The universal goal of a Sikh is to have no hate or animosity to any person, regardless of factors like race, caste, color, creed or gender.

In January 2005, the Jathedar (custodian) of Sri Akal Takht Sahib, Amritsar, Punjab, India, the highest seat of Sikh temporal-religious (miri-piri) authority for interpreting Sikh teachings, issued an edict denouncing same-sex marriages, and urging the worldwide Sikh community not to allow such marriages to take place at any Gurdwara. This was in response to clarification sought from Sikhs in Canada as similar legislation was being discussed and consulted on in Canada.

== Scriptures ==
The Guru Granth Sahib, which is the primary scripture of Sikhism, does not discuss explicitly on gender identity or sexual orientation in detail. However, the teachings in the scripture on equality and human dignity is interpreted by scholars as viewing LGBTQ people on same foot as everyone.

There has been mentioning of eunuchs and other genders in Guru Granth Sahib. In the Guru Granth Sahib, Bhagat Kabir uses the term khusra in a verse on page 324 (Ang 324), questioning whether "If someone could attain liberation through celibacy, brother, why then hasn't a eunuch attained the supreme state?".

The Dasam Granth composition Akal Ustat Verse 11 (151) refers along with men and women, napunsak also as creations of God.

You created men, women and the trans-sexuals (napunsak). You created attendants of the gods, the demi-gods and the snakes. You created the elephants, horses, the chariots and the foot soldier armies. Only you are present in the past, future and the present.

— Teachings of the Sikh Gurus, Translated text from The Nine Sikh Gurus

The writings of Bhai Gurdas also contain references to hijras, khusras and napunsaks. In Vaar 8, Pauri 17, he mentions eunuchs and hijras alongside other physical conditions.

The Sikh Rehat Maryada, which is the official Sikh code of conduct in its Article XVIII, regarding Anand Sanskar (the Sikh marriage ceremony), describes marriage as between a man and a woman. Many Sikh adherents believe the Rehat Maryada is meant to be interpreted and applied to life liberally rather than treated as a binding contract. The Sikh Rehat Maryada emphasizes the importance of a family lifestyle, and many Sikhs believe that since same-sex partners cannot reproduce and make a family that homosexuality should be condemned. This heteronormative way of viewing the family is questioned by those who believe Sikhism is more tolerant of people not viewed as "normal".

== Religious authorities ==
The Akal Takht, which is the highest Sikh authority, has also issued rulings opposing LGBT rights and same-sex marriages.

In January 2005, during the debate on legalisation of Same-sex marriage in Canada, the Akal Takht's gave directive to the Sikh MPs to oppose the bill. Giani Joginder Singh Vedanti of the Akal Takht (the temporal Sikh authority in India) told visiting Sikh-Canadian Members of Parliament (MPs) that they had a religious duty to oppose same-sex marriage: "The basic duty of Sikh MPs in Canada should be to support laws that stop this kind of practice [homosexuality], because there are thousands of Sikhs living in Canada, to ensure that Sikhs do not fall prey to this practice". The divide between supporters and opponents of LGBTQ rights has become increasingly clear, creating a largely generational rift between older conservatives and younger liberals. Many Sikhs believe there is nothing wrong with being LGBT or supporting LGBT rights more generally, including same-sex marriage. These Sikhs believe that the view of some preachers in the Akal Takht is flawed. This was reflected in the voting for the bill where Sikh members of the Canadian Parliament were divided in voting. Sikh members like Navdeep Bains, Ujjal Dosanjh etc supported the legislation, while members like Gurbax Singh Malhi, Nina Grewal, Gurmant Grewal opposed the legislation.

In July 2009, when the Delhi High Court's decriminalised the consensual same-sex sexual activity, the then Jathedar Giani Gurbachan Singh opposed the ruling. In October 2020, the Akal Takht reiterated their opposition again when a Sikh gay marriage was conducted in the presence of the Guru Granth Sahib in California, United States. Similarly in September 2023, Akal Takht took action when a lesbian couple got married in a Sikh wedding at Gurdwara in Bathinda, Punjab. The Takht barred the management committee of the gurdwara from holding positions in other Sikh religious institutions. It also barred the Gurudwara priests and other religious personnels of that Gurudwara from performing religious services for next five years.

The Sikh Council UK has also opposed same-sex marriages. It said that Sikh religious weddings could only be performed for heterosexual couples adopting the Sikh faith.

According to the Sikh Council UK,

We have no objection to same sex couples wanting to make commitments/vows to each other, as they currently do so when they enter civil partnerships. Nor do we object to same sex couples having all legal and other rights, similar to a married couple within a civic union. However, we object to the word marriage being used to replace civil union. The word marriage and its concept is sometimes also used to describe or used as a translation of the 'Anand Karaj' ceremony. The 'Anand Karaj' is specifically a Sikh ceremony, when union between a man and a woman is solemnised in the presence of Guru Granth Sahib. The Sikh Reht Maryada (Sikh Code of Conduct and Conventions)", clearly states that the 'Anand Karaj' ceremony can only take place in the presence of the Guru Granth Sahib in a Gurdwara between a male and female.

The Sarbat, which is an LGBT Sikh organisation argues that the Lavaan (marriage hymns), composed by Guru Ram Das, doesn't explicitly specify the genders of the two people participating in the marriage ceremony. Rather its a spiritual union of two souls regardless of sexual orientation or gender identity.

== Current discussion ==
Although the topic of homosexuality in Sikhism is taboo, the younger generation is looking to the internet for answers. The internet has become a new way for young Sikhs, born inside and outside of India, to discuss religion and current issues anonymously. The internet allows people access to information without the discomfort of talking about it within the community. The internet has become a tool for young Sikhs to get information about current issues that may not be discussed directly within their communities.

Certain individuals use the internet to discuss homosexuality in the community. A Sikh, Manjinder Singh, describes his experiences as a gay Sikh man, using his own platform on YouTube to reach a wider audience in an attempt to generate dialogue in the community that begins by defining what it means to be queer. In one of his videos, he has a conversation with his mother about homosexuality in Punjabi. This video defines what it means to be gay, lesbian, bisexual, and being transgender in Punjabi and is targeted to an audience that does not necessarily understand different sexual and gender identities. Other famous Sikh YouTubers such Sikh Canadian comedian Jus Reign (Jasmeet Singh), and Lilly Singh have openly voiced their support for LGBT rights. In fact, Lilly Singh announced her bisexuality on YouTube.

== Public opinion ==
A 2022 academic study in United Kingdom found that majority (83.3%) of Sikh respondents agreed that heterosexuality and homosexuality should be treated equally while 11.1% disagreed.

A 2020 survey by Sikh Research Institute based 1,212 Sikhs from 31 different countries found that theres a broad support for Sikh institutions for providing support to people of all sexual orientations and gender identities.

== See also ==
- Human male sexuality
- Human female sexuality
- Human sexuality
