= Tuesdays and Fridays =

- Theatrical release poster
- Directed by: Taranveer Singh
- Written by: Taranveer Singh
- Produced by: Sanjay Leela Bhansali; Bhushan Kumar
- Starring: Anmol Dhillon; Jhataleka; Niki Walia; Zoa Morani; Nayan Shukla; Sammy Jonas Heaney; Shivam Bhaargava; Reem Shaikh; Aashim Gulati
- Cinematography: Ewan Mulligan
- Edited by: Rajesh G. Pandey
- Music by: Songs: Tony Kakkar; Score: Sanchit Balhara and Ankit Balhara
- Production companies: T-Series Films; Bhansali Productions
- Distributed by: AA Films
- Release date: 19 February 2021
- Country: India
- Language: Hindi

Tuesdays and Fridays is a romantic comedy film directed by Taranveer Singh and produced by Sanjay Leela Bhansali and Bhushan Kumar. The movie was released on 19 February 2021 stars Anmol Dhillon, Jhataleka, Niki Walia, Zoa Morani, Nayan Shukla, Kamini Khanna, Sammy Jonas Heaney and Reem Shaikh.

== Cast ==
- Jhataleka as Sia Malhotra
- Anmol Dhillon as Varun Sarin
- Zoa Morani as Kajal
- Aashim Gulati as Jatin Singh
- Shivam Bhaargava as Achal Deoda
- Reem Shaikh as Tanya
- Eklavey Kashyap as Nabeel
- Anuradha Patel as Nimmi Sarin
- Niki Aneja Walia as Dr. Radhika Malh
- Sammy Jonas Heaney as William
- Nayan Shukla as Pats

== Release ==
The movie was released on 19 February 2021.

== Soundtrack ==
Tuesdays and Fridays

Soundtrack album by Tony Kakkar
- Released: 13 February 2021
- Genre: Feature film soundtrack
- Length: 22:00
- Language: Hindi
- Label: T-Series

Tony Kakkar chronology
Shubh Mangal Zyada Saavdhan (2020)	Tuesdays and Fridays (2021)	Love Sex Aur Dhokha 2 (2024)
External audio
- Official Audio Jukebox on YouTube

All music is composed by Tony Kakkar.

Track listing
No.	Title	Lyrics	Singer(s)	Length
1.	"Ashleel"	Tony Kakkar	Neha Kakkar, Nakash Aziz	3:10
2.	"Phone Mein Teri Photo"	Tony Kakkar	Neha Kakkar	2:57
3.	"Akhiyaan"	Tony Kakkar	Neha Kakkar, Tony Kakkar, Bohemia	4:40
4.	"Funky Mohabbat"	Kumaar	Sonu Kakkar, Benny Dayal, Shreya Ghoshal	2:49
5.	"Hanjuaan"	Kumaar	Shreya Ghoshal	5:26
6.	"The Golgappa Song"	Kumaar	Sonu Kakkar, Benny Dayal	3:01
Total length:				22:00

== Reception ==
=== Critical reception ===
The Times of India has given 2/5. Cinema Express has given 1/5. FirstPost has given 0.5.
