= Sandwiched Forever =

2020 Indian comedy-drama web television series

- Promotional poster
- Genre: Sitcom
- Written by: Devang Kakkad Hitesh Bali
- Directed by: Rohan Sippy
- Starring: Kunaal Roy Kapur; Aahana Kumra
- Country of origin: India
- Original language: Hindi
- No. of seasons: 1
- No. of episodes: 15

Production
- Running time: 30 minutes
- Production companies: Studio NEXT; Tryiambh Entertainment and Media

Original release
- Network: SonyLIV
- Release: 25 December 2020

Sandwiched Forever is a 2020 Indian comedy-drama web television series that premiered on SonyLIV on 25 December 2020. The series chronicles the life of a young couple, Sameer and Naina, whose life changes after their marriage due to constant interference of their parents. This 15-episode series has some real moments of humour that viewers can engage easily. This situational comedy which is written by Bharat Kukreti, Pankaj Sudheer Mishra & Devang Kakkad shows the confrontation between the ideologies of both generations.

== Plot ==
Sameer and Naina are a young couple who are going to get married. Naina is a national-level badminton player and Sameer is a game developer. Naina is a fit sports person whereas Sameer is very lazy. Their life changes after their marriage due to constant interference of their parents. Their privacy after their marriage goes for a toss as their house is sandwiched between the house of Sameer's parents and Naina's parents. Every episode of the 15-episode series finds Sameer and Naina in a different pickle that they have to wiggle out from, leading to hilarious situations.

== Cast ==
- Kunaal Roy Kapur as Sameer Shastri
- Aahana Kumra as Naina Sarnaik
- Atul Kulkarni as V.K. Sarnaik
- Zakir Hussain as Giriraj Shastri
- Lubna Salim as Manjari Sarnaik
- Divya Seth as Sanyukta Shastri
- Mehul Nisar in various roles

== Episodes ==
No.	Title	Directed by	Written by	Original release date
1	"Sandwich Bana Dala"	Rohan Sippy	Devang Kakkad	25 December 2020
Sameer and Naina are in love with each other and are getting married. They want to stay in a separate home, where there is no interference from their parents/ parents-in-law. VK (Naina's father) proposes them to buy/lease the flat next to VK's. They did move into that flat to expecting no interference from elders but things don't happen as per their expectations. Sameer's parents decide to shift from Kanpur to Mumbai and they also buy the apartment next to Naina and Sameer's, resulting in getting sandwiched between their parents' home.
2	"Ouch the couch!"	Rohan Sippy	Devang Kakkad	25 December 2020
Sameer and Naina are excited to set up their new home. Naina is ready with her shopping list of the furniture. Sameer dreams about romantic nights around the love couch, while he purchased online at an expensive price. But their parents are adamant on purchasing and gifting some furniture to them.
3	"Honey Trap"	Rohan Sippy	Devang Kakkad	25 December 2020
Sameer and Naina want to get away from their parents and secretly plan a honeymoon. They lie to their parents to take a time off. This results in one lie leads to another. Naina's father suspects Sameer of having an extra marital affair. He decides to investigate the matter his style, and ends up confusing himself as well as the other parents.
4	"The first fight"	Rohan Sippy	Devang Kakkad	25 December 2020
Sameer and Naina have their first fight. VK eve's drops and misunderstands that information. He assumes that Sameer is unable to perform well in the bed. He involves Mr.Shastry in his mission of fixing Sameer and Naina's problem.
5	"Mandir Kaha Lagayenge"	Rohan Sippy	Devang Kakkad	25 December 2020
Sameer and Naina are happy to see their parents come together over the thought of performing a pooja in their new home. But their happiness fades away when they find out VK and Sanyukta Shastri both want to lead the pooja in their own way.
6	"Papa ka Siyappa!"	Rohan Sippy	Devang Kakkad	25 December 2020
Lazy Sameer gets out of his laid back approach to prepare for a romantic evening with his wife, Naina. But romance takes a backseat when two uninvited guests, Giriraj and VK come up at their house to stay.
7	"Kamla pe Hamla"	Rohan Sippy	Devang Kakkad	25 December 2020
Sameer and Naina are completely in love with their new maid Kamla. While VK becomes suspicious of Kamla's background, unknowingly Kamla hurts Mrs.Shastry 's ego. Both VK and Mrs.Shastry are adamant to throw Kamla out.
8	"Khana Kharaab"	Rohan Sippy	Devang Kakkad	25 December 2020
Sameer is trapped when he is asked to pick between mother's tasty, but greasy food, and wife's healthy but tasteless dishes. He secretly eats meals prepared by both. Just when he feels his lie is working, both find out the truth.
9	"Suit V/s. Sherwani"	Rohan Sippy	Devang Kakkad	25 December 2020
Naina's cousin (VK's niece) is getting married. Naina picks a suit for Sameer that matches her gown, but Sameer's mother wants him to wear a sherwani. Comedy revolves around how Sameer chooses an interesting way out between wife's suit and mother's sherwani.
10	"Cat fight"	Rohan Sippy	Devang Kakkad	25 December 2020
Sameer's new client wants to meet him at his house to get to know him personally. Initially, the meeting is a huge success. Then comedy revolves when the family members decide to get involved and help.
11	"2+2 = Zero"	Rohan Sippy	Devang Kakkad	25 December 2020
Everyone is brimming with pride as Naina is going to be honored with The Sports Person of The Year award. Comedy comes into play when the parents get ready for the event, but Sameer and Naina realize that they have only two extra passes and four guests to take.
12	"Best Price"	Rohan Sippy	Devang Kakkad	25 December 2020
Sam buys himself a very expensive pair of headphones, but lies to Naina about the price. His joy knows no bounds until he is emotionally blackmailed into buying two more pairs, for VK as well as Sayunkta, that cost him a lot of money.
13	"Car Bekaar!"	Rohan Sippy	Devang Kakkad	25 December 2020
Sameer convinces Naina to buy an expensive sports bike. But for his lifelong dream to come true, he needs approval from four other family members and that's where the confusion starts.
14	"Ring Ring Ringa"	Rohan Sippy	Devang Kakkad	25 December 2020
Sameer forgets Naina's birthday, which is his first after marriage. To make up for it he orders a diamond ring for her. VK senses this, and wants to uses this as an opportunity to one up Sameer.
15	"Badhai Ho!"	Rohan Sippy	Devang Kakkad	25 December 2020
Naina and Sameer decide to adopt a dog. VK overhears them talking about becoming a family of three, and misinterprets it as Naina being pregnant. Parents are overjoyed and start preparing for the new member.

== Production ==
Sandwiched Forever is a true blue sitcom which was shot with a multi camera setup. The actors rehearsed the complete scene and performed it as they would in a theatre (play) performance. Initially the producers were to have a live audience during filming the show like it is done in the west but due to COVID-19 the plans had to change.
