= Aahana Kumra =

Indian actress

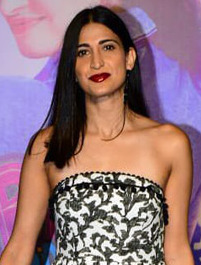
- Kumra in 2022
- Born: 1 May 1985 (age 41); Lucknow, Uttar Pradesh, India
- Occupation: Actress
- Years active: 2007- present

Aahana S Kumra is an Indian film, television and theatre actress. She is known for her television debut in Sony Entertainment Television's Yudh with Amitabh Bachchan and also for her lead role in the TV series Agent Raghav - Crime Branch with Sharad Kelkar, followed by leading roles in a number of feature films.

== Early life ==
Born and raised in Lucknow, Kumra moved to Mumbai during her childhood. She transferred from La Martiniere Girls' College in Lucknow to Mary Immaculate Girls' High School in Mumbai. After completing her schooling, she attended H.R. College of Commerce and Economics, where she earned a degree in Commerce and Economics and a vocational diploma in advertising.

Despite her academic background, Kumra became involved with the Prithvi Theatre, working in various roles from backstage management to ticket sales. To formalize her training, she later joined the inaugural batch of the Whistling Woods International institute to study acting.

== Career ==
Kumra's professional theatre career began with Akvarious Productions. She subsequently performed in several productions of with the theatre company Naseeruddin Shah, Motley, including lead roles in By George and Arms and the Man. During this period, she also appeared in television commercials for brands such as Garnier, Red Label, SBI Life Insurance, and Revlon. She began her television career in 2007 in the horror anthology series Sssshhh... Phir Koi Hai, playing the female lead, an archaeologist named Neha, in the 15th episode, 'Trikoni'. In 2013, Kumra appeared in Makrand Deshpande’s play Sona Spa; she later reprised her role in the film adaptation of the same name, marking one of her earliest experiences in cinema. Same year, she was cast in the television series Yudh - a 20-episode show starring Amitabh Bachchan in which Kumra plays the pivotal role of Bachchan's daughter. Later, she starred in Agent Raghav – Crime Branch, a biweekly television crime thriller show, as the female lead Agent Trisha Dewan opposite Sharad Kelkar. Kumra won Best Actress Award at the Third Moida International Awards for her short film Siberia. She made her Hindi feature film debut in Sona Spa in 2013, and her Tulu feature film debut in 2015 in Kudla Cafe. She hosted the Pro Kabbadi 2016 series. In 2017, Kumra had a leading role in the black comedy film Lipstick Under My Burkha as Leela. The following year she portrayed the role of Priyanka Gandhi in the political biography film The Accidental Prime Minister.

== Filmography ==
=== Films ===
List of film credits
Year	Title	Rol	Notes	Ref.
2009	Mai	Tisha	Short film	
2010	Cardboard Thoughts	Unknown	Short film	
2013	Sona Spa	Ritu		
2013	Ansuni	Meera	Short film	
2015	Kudla Cafe	Sanjana	Tulu film	
2015	Siberia	Reena	Short film	
2015	Dreaming Awake	Esha	Short film	
2015	Ek Tha Main	Afreen	Short film	
2016	The Blueberry Hunt	Jaya		
2016	Queen of Hearts	Lead Role	Short film	
2017	Lipstick Under My Burkha	Leela		
2019	The Accidental Prime Minister	Priyanka Gandhi		
2020	Khuda Haafiz	Tamena Hamid		
2021	Bawri Chhori	Radhika		
2021	Happy Birthday	Beth Rose	Short film	
2022	India Lockdown	Moon Alves		
2022	Salaam Venky	Sanjana		

=== Television ===
List of television credits
Year	Title	Notes	Role
2007	Ssshhhh... Phir Koi Hai	Ep - 15 "Trikoni"	Neha
2009	Bollywood Hero	Clapper Girl	
2014	Yudh	Taruni Sikarwar	
2015	Agent Raghav	Agent Trisha Dewan	
2016	Pro Kabaddi	Host	
2025	Rise and Fall 1	Contestant	12th Place

=== Web series ===
List of web series credits
Year	Title	Role	Ref.
2016	Official Chukyagiri	Rati	
2016	A.I.SHA My Virtual Girlfriend	Shivi Malhotra	
2017	Inside Edge	Shahana Vasishtha	
2017	It Happened In Hong Kong	Aahana	
2018	Official CEOgiri	Rati	
2018	Rangbaaz	Babita Sharma	
2018	Yours Truly	Lali Kumar	
2019	Bombers	Sanjana	
2020	Marzi	Sameera Chauhan	
2020	Betaal	DC "Ahlu" Ahluwalia	
2020	Sandwiched Forever	Naina Sarnaik Shastry	
2020	Forbidden Love	Priya	
2022	Call My Agent: Bollywood	Amal	
2022	Avrodh Season 2	Saman/Karishma Sahay/Parveena Shehnaz	

== Awards and nominations ==
List of awards and nominations received by Aahana Kumra
Year	Award	Category	Work	Result	Ref.
2018	Star Screen Awards	Best Actor in a Supporting Role – Female	Lipstick Under My Burkha	Nominated	
2022	22nd Indian Television Academy Awards	Popular Actor - OTT	Call My Agent: Bollywood	Nominated	
2022	22nd Indian Television Academy Awards	Popular Actor - OTT	Avrodh (Season 2)	Nominated	
