= Eisha Singh =

Indian actress (born 1998)

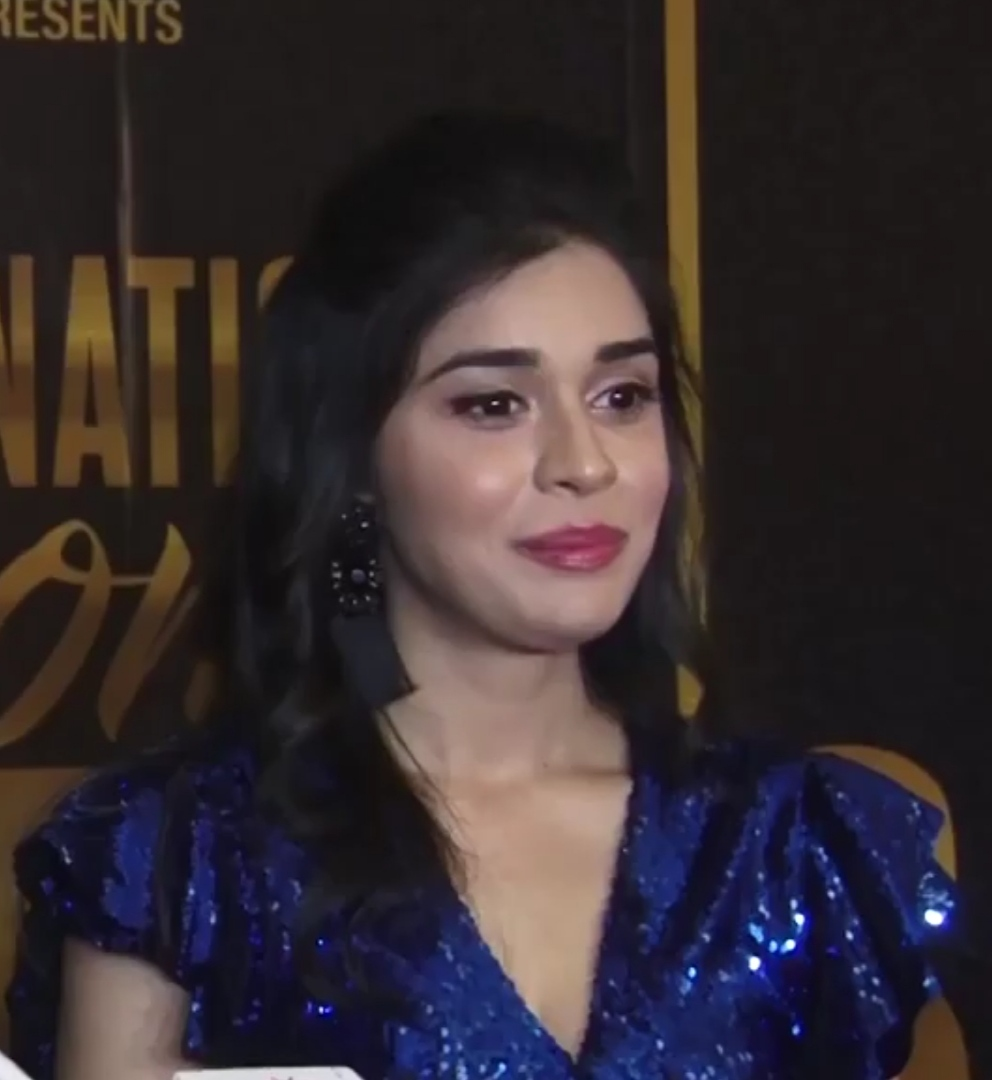
- Singh in 2019
- Born: 24 December 1998 (age 27); Bhopal, Madhya Pradesh, India
- Occupation: Actress
- Years active: 2015–present

Eisha Singh (born 24 December 1998) is an Indian actress who works in Hindi television. She made her debut with Colors TV's soap drama Ishq Ka Rang Safed in 2015. She has since starred in the romantic dramas Ishq Subhan Allah and Sirf Tum. In 2024, she participated in Bigg Boss 18 and emerged as the 5th runner up.

== Early life ==
Singh was born on 24 December 1998 in Bhopal, Madhya Pradesh, India.

== Career ==
=== Debut and breakthrough (2015–2020) ===
At the age of 17, Singh made her television debut in 2015 as Dhaani Tripathi (née Awasthi), a young widow who becames the love interest of an unmarried boy, in love in Ishq Ka Rang Safed opposite Mishal Raheja. Unable to play a mother after a 5 year-leap was introduced, she quit in May 2016 and was replaced by Sanjeeda Sheikh.

From 2016 to 2017, Singh starred opposite Sartaj Gill in Ek Tha Raja Ek Thi Rani. She played three characters, Raani Singh, a princess; Naina, Rani's lookalike and Raani's reincarnated version, Rani Chauhan.

In 2018, Singh portrayed Zara Siddiqui, in the social drama Ishq Subhan Allah opposite Adnan Khan. It dealt with the sensitive and burning issue of Triple Talaq and concluding in 2020. Singh also addressed Islamic social issues through her character for public outreach of the Zee TV campaign Galat Galat Galat through Zara Ka Nazariya to share stories and videos about her point of view. She used her character "Zara Siddiqui" as alias to address contemporary social issues through YouTube, Instagram and Twitter as platforms to reach out to people.

=== Bigg boss 18 and further (2020–present) ===
In 2020, she played Preet in an episode of Pyaar Tune Kya Kiya. In 2021, she appeared in the music video "Main Tera Ho Gaya". From 2021 to 2022, Singh portrayed the role of Suhani, on Colors TV's romantic drama Sirf Tum opposite Vivian Dsena. In 2023, singh portrayed the role of Bela Raichand a Rajpari of Parilok reincarnation of devlekha opposite Shalin Bhanot in a supernatural drama Bekaaboo lasting for four months on Colors TV. Her new show Paithani is a Hindi drama web series directed by Gajendra Ahire will premiere on ZEE5 from November 15, 2024.

Singh made her Hindi film debut with Ratnaa Sinha's romantic comedy Middle Class Love as Ashna Tripathi alongside Prit Kamani in 2022. Writing for Firstpost Subhash K. Jha praised the film stating that "A surprisingly well-packaged, coming-of-age rom-com." She received a nomination for the Zee Cine Award for Best Female Debut.

The same year she participated in Colors TV's controversial reality show Bigg Boss 18 where she finished at sixth place, though she faced criticism for her stint in the house as "mean-spirited" behavior and arguments, showcased an unfiltered personality but made it to the top six despite controversies. Singh addressed trolls by stating "she moved on from the show, viewing it as a finished phase in her career". In November 2025, she joined the comedy cooking competition reality show Laughter Chefs – Unlimited Entertainment season 3.

From December 2025 to January 2026, she portrayed Ananta in Colors TV's supernatural show Naagin 7. From June 2026 to October 2026, she was signed Juhi Suri in Colors TV's Juhi Mui.

== Media image ==
In 2026, she was listed in 30 Under 30 by the Indian edition of Variety.

== Filmography ==
=== Films ===
Year	Title	Role	Language	Ref.
2024	Middle Class Love	Ashna "Ash" Tripathi	Hindi	
2026	Obsess	Sara	Hindi	

=== Television ===
Year	Title	Role	Notes	Ref.
2015–2016	Ishq Ka Rang Safed	Dhaani Awasthi Tripathi		
2016	Ek Tha Raja Ek Thi Rani	Rani Singh Deo / Naina Singh (Note: Singh played dual roles in the show.)	Season 2	
2016–2017	Ek Tha Raja Ek Thi Rani	Rani Chauhan Singh	Season 3	
2018–2020	Ishq Subhan Allah	Zara Siddiqui		
2021–2022	Sirf Tum	Suhani Sharma Oberoi		
2023	Bekaboo	Bela Raichand		
2024–2025	Bigg Boss 18	Contestant	6th place	
2025–2026	Laughter Chefs – Unlimited Entertainment season 3	Participant		
2025–2026	Naagin 7	Ananta Arora		
2026	Juhi Mui	Advocate Juhi Suri		

=== Web series ===
Year	Title	Role	Ref.
2024	Jab Mila Tu	Aneri	
2024	Paithani	Kaveri	
2025	Dooriyan	Varsha	

=== Other appearances ===
Year	Title	Role	Notes	Ref.
2019	Juzz Baat	Herself	Guest appearance	
2020	Pyaar Tune Kya Kiya	Preet	Season 11; Episode 2	
2025	Laughter Chefs – Unlimited Entertainment season 2	Herself	Guest	
2026	Laughter Chefs – Unlimited Entertainment season 3	Herself	Guest	
2026	Mahadev & Sons	Juhi Suri		

=== Music videos ===
Year	Title	Singer	Ref.
2021	Main Tera Ho Gaya	Yasser Desai	
2022	Kaale Kaale Chashme	Stebin Ben	
2022	Jahan Base Dil	Raj Barman	
2022	Tu Mujhse Juda	Akhil Sachdeva	
2025	Kala Sha Kala	Ramji Gulati	
2025	Aao Na	Adnan Sami and Asha Bhosle	
2025	Jaadu Hai	Ramji Gulati	
2025	Pyar Karta Hun	Yasser Desai	
2026	Shukriya	Hansika Pareek, Vibhor Parashar	

== Awards and nominations ==
Year	Award	Category	Work	Result	Ref.
2016	Colors Golden Petal Awards	Best Debutante Female	Ishq Ka Rang Safed	Won	
2018	Gold Awards	Best Actress Popular	Ishq Subhan Allah	Nominated	
2019	Indian Telly Awards	Best Onscreen Couple (With Adnan Khan)	Ishq Subhan Allah	Nominated	
2023	Zee Cine Awards	Best Female Debut	Middle Class Love	Nominated	
2025	Indian Telly Awards	Favorite Jodi (Non-Fiction) (With Avinash Mishra)	Bigg Boss 18	Nominated	
