= The Married Woman =

- Genre: Drama; Romance
- Written by: Jaya Misra; Surabhi Saral Sachdev
- Directed by: Sahir Raza
- Starring: Riddhi Dogra; Monica Dogra; Suhaas Ahuja; Imaad Shah
- Country of origin: India
- Original language: Hindi
- No. of seasons: 1
- No. of episodes: 11

Production
- Producer: Samar Khan
- Production location: India
- Cinematography: John Wilmor
- Production company: Juggernaut Productions

Original release
- Network: ALTBalaji; ZEE5
- Release: 8 March 2021

The Married Woman is an Indian Hindi-language, romantic drama web series featuring Riddhi Dogra, Monica Dogra, Suhaas Ahuja, and Imaad Shah. Directed by Sahir Raza and produced by Juggernaut Productions, this web series is currently streaming on ALTBalaji and ZEE5. The trailer was released at a launch event in Mumbai on 13 February 2021. It is based on Manju Kapur's book, A Married Woman.

== Synopsis ==
It is a story of two women, Aastha and Peeplika, set in the early '90s, where Aastha is a dutiful housewife and a mother while Peeplika is an unconventional artist and has never been impressed by the routines in her life. Aastha sets out on a journey of self-discovery and meets Peeplika en route. Aastha frees herself from the pressures and boundaries of society when she finds an intense connection with Peeplika, something that she always longed for. All this happens amidst the riots after Babri Masjid demolition horrified the nation.

== Cast ==
- Riddhi Dogra as Aastha
- Monica Dogra as Peeplika
- Suhaas Ahuja as Hemant
- Imaad Shah as Aijaz
- Nadira Babbar as Hemant's Mother
- Rahul Vohra as Hemant's Father
- Ayesha Raza as Babbo
- Samridhi Dewan as Timsi
- Nabeel Ahmed as Mudassar
- Divya Seth as Peeplika's Mother
- Sangeeta Balachandran as Garima Jain (Aastha's mother)

== Episode list ==
No. overall	No. in season	Title	Directed by	Written by	Original release date
1	1	"Blurred Lines"	Sahir Raza	Jaya Misra, Surabhi Saral, Aparna Nadig	8 March 2021
Astha and Aijaz belong to a different background yet, however, they end up working together on a play. They both start growing fond of each other. But an unfortunate event happens at the theatre to threaten Aijaz.
2	2	"Line ke Uss Paar"	Sahir Raza	Jaya Misra, Surabhi Saral, Aparna Nadig	8 March 2021
Aijaz gifts a book of poems to Astha while she starts falling for him. On the other hand, Aijaz only likes her as a friend. Astha's family is worried and does not want her to attend the play due to ongoing riots. She still decides to go and after the play she congratulates Aijaz. She also confesses her love for him.
3	3	"Kya khoya, kya paaya"	Sahir Raza	Jaya Misra, Surabhi Saral, Aparna Nadig	8 March 2021
Astha and Hemant are hosting a party. Timsi wishes to speak to Astha about an urgent matter. Later, Timsi elopes with Mudassar and Peeplika helps the two lovers get married against their family's wishes. Astha arrives at the art gallery and meets Peeplika.
4	4	"Mulaqat khud se"	Sahir Raza	Jaya Misra, Surabhi Saral, Aparna Nadig	8 March 2021
Timsi and Mudassar show up at her parents' house, unexpectedly. Hemant is angry and calls up Mudassar's parents to speak about the situation. Astha calls Peeplika to help resolve the matter between the families. Later, everyone accepts the marriage and Astha consoles Peeplika.
5	5	"Sahi Galat ke Beech"	Sahir Raza	Jaya Misra, Surabhi Saral	8 March 2021
Astha is confused about how she feels for Peeplika. When Peeplika arrives at Astha's home for Timsi and Mudassar's wedding, she confronts Astha about her feelings. Astha denies, but Peeplika encourages her to embrace her true self.
6	6	"Dil-e-nadaan, Tujhe hua kya hai?"	Sahir Raza	Jaya Misra, Surabhi Saral	8 March 2021
Babbo becomes sceptical about Astha and Peeplika's relationship and confides in Hemant. Peeplika shares some of her bitter-sweet memories with Astha. When Babbo takes Astha for shopping, she makes an excuse to meet Peeplika's Mom.
7	7	"Ishq aur Mushq"	Sahir Raza	Jaya Misra, Surabhi Saral	8 March 2021
The ongoing riots have made the government to put the city under curfew. Astha still manages to meet Peeplika who invites her to a relief camp. Hemant realizes that Astha has been lying to him about her plans till now.
8	8	"Half Full/ Half Empty"	Sahir Raza	Jaya Misra, Surabhi Saral	8 March 2021
Hemant suspects Astha of cheating and is unhappy about her sudden disappearance. Astha tries to put her side upon her return. Peeplika wants Astha to meet her friends. After this, Astha goes for meeting Mudassar but things go south when the riots break out again.
9	9	"The Wedding Anniversary"	Sahir Raza	Jaya Misra, Surabhi Saral	8 March 2021
Astha's mother visits Hemant's place to celebrate their 11th wedding anniversary. Babbo taunts Sunita over Astha's actions. Peeplika shows up at the celebration, when Babbo catches Astha and Peeplika getting intimate with each other.
10	10	"New Horizons"	Sahir Raza	Jaya Misra, Surabhi Saral	8 March 2021
Babbo informs Hemant about the intimacy between Astha and Peeplika. Peeplika gets a new job in Paris and she wants to take Astha with her. Hemant confronts Astha and after a heated argument with him, Astha decides to move to Paris.
11	11	"Crossroads"	Sahir Raza	Jaya Misra, Surabhi Saral	8 March 2021
Astha starts training her kids to be self-dependent as she prepares to begin a new life with Peeplika. Later, she learns about Peeplika's past and confronts her before taking her final decision.

== Reception ==
Sweta Kaushal from Hindustan Times feels the show is a stereotypical act. It is all about politics and religion and the one which is heard mostly. She simply summarizes the review in the title: "Melodrama and Monologue kills the charm". Actors Riddhi and Monika Dogra have tried their best to act in spite of limited scope.

Archika Khurana of The Times of India feels it is "A milieu of good performances challenging societal norms". The critics rating on TOI is 3/5 and average user rating goes to 3.5/5. The review ends with a solid line that says, "'The Married Woman' takes too long to make its point heard but it is the performances that hold your attention throughout".
