= Riddhi Dogra =

Indian actress

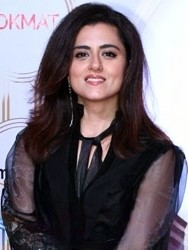
- Dogra in 2023
- Born: 22 September 1984 (age 42) or 22 September 1985 (age 41); Delhi, India
- Occupation: Actress
- Years active: 2008–present
- Spouse: Raqesh Bapat (m. 2011; div. 2019)
- Relatives: Akshay Dogra (brother); Arun Jaitley (uncle)

Riddhi Dogra (born 22 September 1984 or 1985) is an Indian actress known for her roles in Asur, The Married Woman, Maryada: Lekin Kab Tak? and Woh Apna Sa. She also participated in Nach Baliye 6, Khatron Ke Khiladi 6 and The 50.

== Early life ==
Dogra was born on 22 September 1984/85 in Delhi. She studied at Apeejay School, Sheikh Sarai in New Delhi and graduated in Psychology (Honours) from Kamala Nehru College.

== Career ==
Before she entered the television industry, Dogra was a dancer in the Shiamak Dawar Dance Institute. Her first job in the industry was as a co-producer on Zoom.

She has also hosted many televised events and travel based shows for Zee TV, NDTV Good times, Zoom Television, and on ground events since her years in Television. In 2013, she participated in Nach Baliye 6. Dogra also played Savitri in Savitri, Aditi in Diya Aur Baati Hum, and Nisha in Woh Apna Sa.

The Married Woman, had her in the titular role, directed by Sahir Raza. Dogra gathered critical acclaim and appreciation from her fans and audiences alike. The web series also features Monica Dogra in the lead role.

== Personal life ==
Dogra married actor Raqesh Bapat in 2011. They separated and divorced in 2019.

Her brother is actor Akshay Dogra and their uncle was former Bhartiya Janata Party politician and former Finance/Defence Minister of Government of India Arun Jaitley.

== Filmography ==
=== Films ===
Year	Title	Role	Notes	Ref
2023	Lakadbaggha	Akshara D'Souza		
2023	Jawan	Jailer Kaveri "Kaveri Amma"		
2023	Tiger 3	Shaheen Baig		
2024	The Sabarmati Report	Manika Rajpurohit		
2025	Aabeer Gulaal	Avantika		

=== Television ===
Year	Title	Role	Notes
2007	Jhoome Jiiya Re	Himani	
2008	Radhaa Ki Betiyaan Kuch Kar Dikhayengi	Rani	
2009	Hindi Hai Hum	Bubbly	
2010	Horror Nights		
2010	Rishta.com	Sureena	
2010	Seven	Diya	
2010	Maat Pitaah Ke Charnon Mein Swarg	Payal	
2010	Laagi Tujhse Lagan	Supriya	
2010–2012	Maryada: Lekin Kab Tak?	Priya Aditya Jakhar	
2013	Savitri	Rajkumari Damyanti / Savitri Rai Chaudhary	
2014	Yeh Hai Aashiqui	Mili Bhatnagar	
2013–2014	Nach Baliye 6	Contestant	6th place
2015	Fear Factor: Khatron Ke Khiladi 6	Contestant	12th place
2015	Diya Aur Baati Hum	Coach Aditi	
2016	Darr Sabko Lagta Hai		
2016	I Don't Watch TV	Herself	
2017–2018	Woh Apna Sa	Nisha Jindal	
2021	Indian Idol	Herself	Guest
2021	Kumkum Bhagya	Herself	Guest
2021	Kundali Bhagya	Herself	Guest
2026	The 50	Contestant	Semi Finalist

=== Web series ===
Year	Title	Role	Ref.
2020–present	Asur: Welcome to your Dark Side	Nusrat Saeed	
2021	The Married Woman	Astha	
2022	TVF Pitchers 2	Prachi Meena	
2023	Badtameez Dil	Himmat "Liz" Kaur Dhillon	
2023	Mumbai Diaries 2	Dr. Sandhya D'Souza	
2025	Kull: The Legacy of the Raisingghs	Kavya Raisinggh	

=== Music video appearances ===
Year	Title	Singer(s)	Ref.
2022	"Barsaat Ho Jaaye"	Jubin Nautiyal, Payal Dev	

== Awards and nominations ==
Year	Award	Category	Role	Show	Result
2011	Indian Television Academy Awards	Best Actress Drama (Jury)	Priya Jakhar	Maryada: Lekin Kab Tak?	Nominated
2013	Gold Awards	Best Actress (Popular)	Savitri	Savitri	Nominated
2017	Gold Awards	Best Actor in Negative Role (Female)	Nisha	Woh Apna Sa	Won
